= 1998 Toronto Blue Jays season =

1998 Toronto Blue Jays
- League: American League
- Division: East
- Ballpark: SkyDome
- City: Toronto
- Record: 88–74 (.543)
- Divisional place: 3rd
- Owners: Interbrew, Canadian Imperial Bank of Commerce
- General managers: Gord Ash
- Managers: Tim Johnson
- Television: CBC Television (Brian Williams, John Cerutti); The Sports Network (Dan Shulman, Buck Martinez)
- Radio: CHUM (AM) (Jerry Howarth, Tom Cheek)

The 1998 Toronto Blue Jays season was the franchise's 22nd season of Major League Baseball. It resulted in the Blue Jays finishing third in the American League East with a record of 88 wins and 74 losses, which was their best record since their 1993 World Series-winning season; the 88 wins were not surpassed until 2015.

With the disappointing last-place finish of the previous year, General Manager Gord Ash once again dug into the wallet to improve the team, signing reliever Randy Myers and slugger José Canseco as free agents. Though the team improved noticeably (thanks to another pitching Triple Crown and Cy Young Award-winning campaign by ace hurler Roger Clemens and a powerful lineup that featured Canseco, Carlos Delgado, Shawn Green, and José Cruz Jr.), they could not finish ahead of the New York Yankees or the Boston Red Sox, who won 114 and 92 games en route to winning the division crown and wild card respectively.

== Transactions ==
Transactions by the Toronto Blue Jays during the off-season before the 1998 season.

=== October 1997 ===
| October 6 | Luis Andújar granted free agency (signed with Toronto Blue Jays to a one-year contract on November 11, 1997). Jacob Brumfield granted free agency (signed with Toronto Blue Jays to a one-year contract on January 5, 1998), |
| October 15 | Huck Flener granted free agency. Ryan Thompson granted free agency. |
| October 17 | Rickey Cradle granted free agency (signed with Seattle Mariners to a one-year contract on November 7, 1997). |
| October 27 | Orlando Merced granted free agency (signed with Minnesota Twins to a one-year, $800,000 contract on January 14, 1998). Charlie O'Brien granted free agency (signed with Chicago White Sox to a two-year, $1.4 million contract on December 10, 1997). |
| October 28 | Joe Carter granted free agency (signed with Baltimore Orioles to a one-year, $3.3 million contract on December 12, 1997). Mariano Duncan granted free agency. Juan Samuel granted free agency (signed with Toronto Blue Jays to a one-year, $421,000 contract. |
| October 29 | Selected Dane Johnson off of waivers from the Oakland Athletics. |

=== November 1997 ===
| November 11 | Re-signed free agent Luis Andújar to a one-year contract. |
| November 18 | Rich Butler selected by Tampa Bay Devil Rays as the 10th pick in the 1997 MLB expansion draft. Omar Daal selected by Arizona Diamondbacks as the 31st pick in the 1997 MLB expansion draft. Marty Janzen selected by the Arizona Diamondbacks in the 1997 MLB expansion draft. |
| November 25 | Signed free agent Shannon Withem from the Detroit Tigers to a contract. |
| November 26 | Signed free agent Darrin Fletcher from the Montreal Expos to a two-year, $4.1 million contract. Signed free agent Randy Myers from the Baltimore Orioles to a three-year, $18 million contract. |
| November 27 | Signed free agent Craig Grebeck from the Anaheim Angels to a one-year, $390,000 contract. Signed free agent Pat Kelly from the New York Yankees to a one-year, $325,000 contract. |

=== December 1997 ===
| December 6 | Re-signed free agent Juan Samuel to a one-year, $421,000 contract. |
| December 8 | Signed free agent Mark Dalesandro from the Chicago Cubs to a contract. Signed free agent Tony Fernández from the Cleveland Indians to a two-year, $4.2 million contract. Signed free agent Mike Stanley from the New York Yankees to a two-year, $6.15 million contract. |
| December 10 | Signed free agent Alex Delgado from the Florida Marlins to a one-year contract. |
| December 11 | Signed free agent José Herrera from the Oakland Athletics to a one-year contract. Traded Sandy Martínez to the Chicago Cubs for a player to be named later (Trevor Schaffer on December 19, 1997). |
| December 15 | Drafted Luis Saturria from the St. Louis Cardinals in the 1997 MLB Rule 5 draft. Joe Davenport drafted by the Chicago White Sox in the 1997 MLB Rule 5 draft. |
| December 21 | Carlos García granted free agency (signed with Cleveland Indians to a contract on January 6, 1998). |

=== January 1998 ===
| January 5 | Re-signed free agent Jacob Brumfield to a one-year contract. |
| January 20 | Signed free agent Phil Plantier from the St. Louis Cardinals to a contract. |

=== February 1998 ===
| February 4 | Signed free agent Jose Canseco from the Oakland Athletics to a one-year, $2.1 million contract. |
| February 6 | Re-signed Shawn Green to a two-year, $4.625 million contract. |

=== March 1998 ===
| March 14 | Acquired Kevin Brown from the Texas Rangers for Tim Crabtree. |
| March 15 | Re-signed Dan Plesac to a contract extension through 1999 (one-year, $1.5 million in 1999). |
| March 20 | Returned Luis Saturria to the St. Louis Cardinals. |
| March 24 | Released Jacob Brumfield. |
| March 25 | Signed free agent Patrick Lennon from the Anaheim Angels to a contract. |
| March 30 | Robert Pérez selected off of waivers by the Seattle Mariners. |

== Regular season ==
=== Season standings ===
AL East
| Team | W | L | Pct. | GB | Home | Road |
|---|---|---|---|---|---|---|
| New York Yankees | 114 | 48 | .704 | — | 62‍–‍19 | 52‍–‍29 |
| Boston Red Sox | 92 | 70 | .568 | 22 | 51‍–‍30 | 41‍–‍40 |
| Toronto Blue Jays | 88 | 74 | .543 | 26 | 51‍–‍30 | 37‍–‍44 |
| Baltimore Orioles | 79 | 83 | .488 | 35 | 42‍–‍39 | 37‍–‍44 |
| Tampa Bay Devil Rays | 63 | 99 | .389 | 51 | 33‍–‍48 | 30‍–‍51 |

=== Record vs. opponents ===
1998 American League record Source: MLB Standings Grid – 1998
| Team | ANA | BAL | BOS | CWS | CLE | DET | KC | MIN | NYY | OAK | SEA | TB | TEX | TOR | NL |
|---|---|---|---|---|---|---|---|---|---|---|---|---|---|---|---|
| Anaheim | — | 5–6 | 6–5 | 5–6 | 4–7 | 8–3 | 6–5 | 6–5 | 6–5 | 5–7 | 9–3 | 6–5 | 5–7 | 4–7 | 10–6 |
| Baltimore | 6–5 | — | 6–6 | 2–9 | 5–6 | 10–1 | 5–6 | 7–3 | 3–9 | 8–3 | 6–5 | 5–7 | 6–5 | 5–7 | 5–11 |
| Boston | 5–6 | 6–6 | — | 5–6 | 8–3 | 5–5 | 8–3 | 5–6 | 5–7 | 9–2 | 7–4 | 9–3 | 6–5 | 5–7 | 9–7 |
| Chicago | 6–5 | 9–2 | 6–5 | — | 6–6 | 6–6 | 8–4 | 6–6 | 4–7 | 4–7 | 4–7 | 5–6 | 5–6 | 4–6–1 | 7–9 |
| Cleveland | 7–4 | 6–5 | 3–8 | 6–6 | — | 9–3 | 8–4 | 6–6 | 4–7 | 3–8 | 9–2 | 7–3 | 4–7 | 7–4 | 10–6 |
| Detroit | 3–8 | 1–10 | 5–5 | 6–6 | 3–9 | — | 6–6 | 8–4 | 3–8 | 7–4 | 3–8 | 5–6 | 3–8 | 5–6 | 7–9 |
| Kansas City | 5–6 | 6–5 | 3–8 | 4–8 | 4–8 | 6–6 | — | 7–5 | 0–10 | 7–4 | 4–6 | 8–3 | 3–8 | 6–5 | 9–7 |
| Minnesota | 5–6 | 3–7 | 6–5 | 6–6 | 6–6 | 4–8 | 5–7 | — | 4–7 | 4–7 | 2–9 | 7–4 | 7–4 | 4–7 | 7–9 |
| New York | 5–6 | 9–3 | 7–5 | 7–4 | 7–4 | 8–3 | 10–0 | 7–4 | — | 8–3 | 8–3 | 11–1 | 8–3 | 6–6 | 13–3 |
| Oakland | 7–5 | 3–8 | 2–9 | 7–4 | 8–3 | 4–7 | 4–7 | 7–4 | 3–8 | — | 5–7 | 5–6 | 6–6 | 5–6 | 8–8 |
| Seattle | 3–9 | 5–6 | 4–7 | 7–4 | 2–9 | 8–3 | 6–4 | 9–2 | 3–8 | 7–5 | — | 6–5 | 5–7 | 4–7 | 7–9 |
| Tampa Bay | 5–6 | 7–5 | 3–9 | 6–5 | 3–7 | 6–5 | 3–8 | 4–7 | 1–11 | 6–5 | 5–6 | — | 4–7 | 5–7 | 5–11 |
| Texas | 7–5 | 5–6 | 5–6 | 6–5 | 7–4 | 8–3 | 8–3 | 4–7 | 3–8 | 6–6 | 7–5 | 7–4 | — | 7–4 | 8–8 |
| Toronto | 7–4 | 7–5 | 7–5 | 6–4–1 | 4–7 | 6–5 | 5–6 | 7–4 | 6–6 | 6–5 | 7–4 | 7–5 | 4–7 | — | 9–7 |

=== Transactions ===
Transactions for the Toronto Blue Jays during the 1998 regular season.

==== April 1998 ====
| April 1 | Signed free agent Dave Stieb to a one-year, $300,000 contract. |

==== May 1998 ====
| May 21 | Signed amateur free agent Scott Cassidy to a contract. |
| May 29 | Selected Ben Van Ryn off of waivers from the San Diego Padres. |

==== June 1998 ====
| June 16 | Released Erik Hanson. |

==== July 1998 ====
| July 1 | Signed free agent Tony Phillips from the Anaheim Angels to a one-year contract. |
| July 3 | Signed amateur free agent Gustavo Chacín to a contract. |
| July 10 | Released Luis Andújar. |
| July 16 | Player rights of Pat Kelly sold to the St. Louis Cardinals. |
| July 30 | Acquired Pete Munro and Jay Yennaco from the Boston Red Sox for Mike Stanley. |
| July 31 | Acquired Nerio Rodríguez and Shannon Carter from the Baltimore Orioles for Juan Guzmán. Acquired Scott Rivette from the Oakland Athletics for Ed Sprague Jr. Acquired Leo Estrella from the New York Mets for Tony Phillips. |

==== August 1998 ====
| August 6 | Acquired Brian Loyd from the San Diego Padres for Randy Myers. |

==== September 1998 ====
| September 23 | Julio Mosquera selected off of waivers by the Tampa Bay Devil Rays. |
| September 25 | Signed amateur free agent Guillermo Quiróz to a contract. |

=== 1998 MLB draft ===
- June 2, 1998: Felipe López was drafted by the Toronto Blue Jays in the 1st round (8th pick) of the 1998 amateur draft. Player signed August 11, 1998.

=== Roster ===
1998 Toronto Blue Jays
Roster
| Pitchers: 40 Carlos Almanzar; 49 Luis Andújar; 26 Chris Carpenter; 21 Roger Clemens; 45 Kelvim Escobar; 57 Juan Guzmán; 52 Roy Halladay; 39 Erik Hanson; 41 Pat Hentgen; 28 Randy Myers; 31 Robert Person; 19 Dan Plesac; 48 Paul Quantrill; 55 Bill Risley; 39 Nerio Rodríguez; 53 Steve Sinclair; 37 Dave Stieb; 50 Ben Van Ryn; 30 Woody Williams; 58 Shannon Withem | Catchers: 14 Kevin Brown; 59,5 Mark Dalesandro; 9 Darrin Fletcher; 18 Benito Santiago; Infielders: 25 Carlos Delgado; 2 Tom Evans; 1 Tony Fernández; 8 Alex Gonzalez; 4 Craig Grebeck; 13 Tomás Pérez; 33 Ed Sprague; 20 Mike Stanley; 6 Kevin Witt | Outfielders: 44,33 Jose Canseco; 3 Felipe Crespo; 23 José Cruz Jr.; 15 Shawn Green; 20 Patrick Lennon; 12 Tony Phillips; 11 Juan Samuel; 24 Shannon Stewart | Manager: 17 Tim Johnson; Coaches: 22 Sal Butera (bullpen); 16 Jack Hubbard (first base); 10 Jim Lett (bench); 36 Gary Matthews (hitting); 34 Mel Queen (pitching); 7 Eddie Rodríguez (third base) |

=== Game log ===
1998 Game Log
April: 10–16 (Home: 5–8; Away: 5–8)

| # | Date | Opponent | Score | Win | Loss | Save | Attendance | Record |
|---|---|---|---|---|---|---|---|---|
| 1 | April 1 | Twins | 3–2 | Clemens (1–0) | Tewksbury (0–1) | Myers (1) | 41,387 | 1–0 |
| 2 | April 2 | Twins | 3–2 | Guardado (1–0) | Escobar (0–1) | Aguilera (1) | 25,584 | 1–1 |
| 3 | April 3 | Rangers | 5–0 | Helling (1–0) | Guzmán (0–1) | | 25,509 | 1–2 |
| 4 | April 4 | Rangers | 9–2 | Williams (1–0) | Oliver (0–1) | | 30,156 | 2–2 |
| 5 | April 5 | Rangers | 6–5 | Burkett (1–1) | Risley (0–1) | Wetteland (1) | 28,106 | 2–3 |
| 6 | April 7 | @ Twins | 12–2 | Tewksbury (1–1) | Clemens (1–1) | | 8,421 | 2–4 |
| 7 | April 8 | @ Twins | 9–6 | Hentgen (1–0) | Hawkins (0–1) | Myers (2) | 8,532 | 3–4 |
| 8 | April 9 | @ Twins | 13–2 | Radke (1–1) | Guzmán (0–2) | | 9,075 | 3–5 |
| 9 | April 10 | @ Rangers | 4–3 | Helling (2–0) | Plesac (0–1) | Wetteland (2) | 32,314 | 3–6 |
| 10 | April 11 | @ Rangers | 9–8 | Almanzar (1–0) | Oliver (0–2) | Myers (3) | 37,520 | 4–6 |
| 11 | April 12 | @ Rangers | 3–1 | Wetteland (1–0) | Quantrill (0–1) | | 28,435 | 4–7 |
| 12 | April 13 | @ Royals | 11–1 | Rusch (1–2) | Hentgen (1–1) | | 11,749 | 4–8 |
| 13 | April 14 | @ Royals | 5–1 | Guzmán (1–2) | Rapp (0–1) | Quantrill (1) | 11,194 | 5–8 |
| 14 | April 15 | @ Royals | 7–3 | Haney (2–0) | Williams (1–1) | | 11,316 | 5–9 |
| 15 | April 17 | White Sox | 6–1 | Clemens (2–1) | Bere (0–3) | | 28,240 | 6–9 |
| 16 | April 18 | White Sox | 9–4 | Hentgen (2–1) | Navarro (1–2) | | 29,065 | 7–9 |
| 17 | April 19 | White Sox | 5–4 (12) | Carpenter (1–0) | Castillo (0–1) | | 31,265 | 8–9 |
| 18 | April 20 | Yankees | 3–2 (11) | Banks (1–0) | Risley (0–2) | Stanton (4) | 26,385 | 8–10 |
| 19 | April 21 | Yankees | 5–3 (10) | Stanton (1–0) | Plesac (0–2) | | 27,192 | 8–11 |
| 20 | April 22 | Yankees | 9–1 | Pettitte (3–2) | Clemens (2–2) | | 29,164 | 8–12 |
| 21 | April 24 | @ White Sox | 3–1 | Hentgen (3–1) | Navarro (1–3) | Myers (4) | 14,198 | 9–12 |
| 22 | April 25 | @ White Sox | 8–1 | Eyre (1–2) | Guzmán (1–3) | | 14,457 | 9–13 |
| 23 | April 26 | @ White Sox | 5–5 (6) | Postponed (rain) Rescheduled for July 15 | | | 13,705 | 9–13 |
| 24 | April 27 | @ Yankees | 1–0 | Pettitte (4–2) | Clemens (2–3) | Rivera (2) | 17,863 | 9–14 |
| 25 | April 28 | @ Yankees | 5–2 | Williams (2–1) | Mendoza (0–1) | Myers (5) | 18,727 | 10–14 |
| 26 | April 29 | Royals | 7–2 | Pichardo (1–2) | Hentgen (3–2) | | 25,644 | 10–15 |
| 27 | April 30 | Royals | 7–4 | Rusch (3–3) | Guzmán (1–4) | Montgomery (5) | 26,690 | 10–16 |

May: 18–11 (Home: 8–6; Away: 10–5)

| # | Date | Opponent | Score | Win | Loss | Save | Attendance | Record |
|---|---|---|---|---|---|---|---|---|
| 28 | May 1 | @ Athletics | 5–2 | Candiotti (3–3) | Hanson (0–1) | Taylor (7) | 7,078 | 10–17 |
| 29 | May 2 | @ Athletics | 7–0 | Clemens (3–3) | Oquist (0–1) | | 10,729 | 11–17 |
| 30 | May 3 | @ Athletics | 6–3 | Williams (3–1) | Telgheder (0–1) | Myers (6) | 23,463 | 12–17 |
| 31 | May 4 | @ Athletics | 7–4 | Rogers (5–1) | Hentgen (3–3) | | 5,206 | 12–18 |
| 32 | May 5 | @ Angels | 13–11 | Plesac (1–2) | Percival (0–2) | Myers (7) | 17,271 | 13–18 |
| 33 | May 6 | @ Angels | 6–5 | Escobar (1–1) | Hasegawa (1–1) | Myers (8) | 17,392 | 14–18 |
| 34 | May 7 | @ Mariners | 6–0 | Clemens (4–3) | Moyer (2–4) | | 24,129 | 15–18 |
| 35 | May 8 | @ Mariners | 8–3 | Johnson (3–1) | Williams (3–2) | | 29,920 | 15–19 |
| 36 | May 9 | @ Mariners | 4–1 | Hentgen (4–3) | Swift (2–2) | Myers (9) | 49,851 | 16–19 |
| 37 | May 10 | @ Mariners | 3–1 | Fassero (4–1) | Guzmán (1–5) | Ayala (7) | 39,249 | 16–20 |
| 38 | May 12 | Athletics | 4–3 (10) | Myers (1–0) | Taylor (0–3) | | 25,636 | 17–20 |
| 39 | May 13 | Athletics | 4–2 | Haynes (2–1) | Clemens (4–4) | Fetters (2) | 25,732 | 17–21 |
| 40 | May 14 | Angels | 5–4 | Myers (2–0) | DeLucia (1–2) | | 25,606 | 18–21 |
| 41 | May 15 | Angels | 9–1 | Hentgen (5–3) | Hill (6–2) | | 26,644 | 19–21 |
| 42 | May 16 | Mariners | 8–1 | Fassero (5–1) | Guzmán (1–6) | | 31,121 | 19–22 |
| 43 | May 17 | Mariners | 4–3 | Plesac (2–2) | Slocumb (1–3) | | 28,111 | 20–22 |
| 44 | May 18 | Mariners | 9–4 | Spoljaric (3–0) | Clemens (4–5) | | 28,125 | 20–23 |
| 45 | May 19 | Devil Rays | 3–1 | Williams (4–2) | Springer (1–7) | Myers (10) | 25,662 | 21–23 |
| 46 | May 20 | Devil Rays | 9–1 | Hentgen (6–3) | Álvarez (4–5) | | 26,107 | 22–23 |
| 47 | May 21 | Devil Rays | 6–1 | Guzmán (2–6) | Arrojo (6–3) | | 30,108 | 23–23 |
| 48 | May 22 | @ Indians | 9–7 | Burba (5–4) | Hanson (0–2) | Jackson (12) | 43,269 | 23–24 |
| 49 | May 23 | @ Indians | 7–2 | Clemens (5–5) | Colón (3–3) | | 43,306 | 24–24 |
| 50 | May 24 | @ Indians | 5–0 | Williams (5–2) | Gooden (0–1) | | 43,194 | 25–24 |
| 51 | May 25 | @ Red Sox | 7–5 | Hentgen (7–3) | Martínez (5–1) | Myers (11) | 32,342 | 26–24 |
| 52 | May 26 | @ Red Sox | 5–2 | Guzmán (3–6) | Avery (1–1) | Myers (12) | 27,668 | 27–24 |
| 53 | May 28 | Indians | 6–2 | Burba (6–4) | Carpenter (1–1) | | 30,282 | 27–25 |
| 54 | May 29 | Indians | 7–3 | Colón (4–3) | Clemens (5–6) | | 29,085 | 27–26 |
| 55 | May 30 | Indians | 4–2 | Williams (6–2) | Gooden (0–2) | Myers (13) | 37,179 | 28–26 |
| 56 | May 31 | Indians | 8–3 | Nagy (7–2) | Hentgen (7–4) | Mesa (1) | 30,090 | 28–27 |

June: 14–14 (Home: 8–5; Away: 6–9)

| # | Date | Opponent | Score | Win | Loss | Save | Attendance | Record |
|---|---|---|---|---|---|---|---|---|
| 57 | June 1 | Red Sox | 9–5 | Corsi (2–0) | Myers (2–1) | | 27,372 | 28–28 |
| 58 | June 2 | Red Sox | 11–3 | Avery (2–1) | Carpenter (1–2) | | 26,177 | 28–29 |
| 59 | June 3 | Tigers | 5–1 | Clemens (6–6) | Greisinger (0–1) | | 26,291 | 29–29 |
| 60 | June 4 | Tigers | 9–6 | Williams (7–2) | Moehler (5–5) | Myers (14) | 34,408 | 30–29 |
| 61 | June 5 | Phillies | 8–7 | Green (4–4) | Risley (0–3) | Leiter (11) | 31,176 | 30–30 |
| 62 | June 6 | Phillies | 10–6 | Gomes (5–2) | Guzmán (3–7) | | 30,102 | 30–31 |
| 63 | June 7 | Phillies | 3–1 | Carpenter (2–2) | Schilling (5–7) | Myers (15) | 26,236 | 31–31 |
| 64 | June 8 | @ Marlins | 4–3 (17) | Edmondson (1–1) | Hanson (0–3) | | 17,414 | 31–32 |
| 65 | June 9 | @ Marlins | 5–4 | Hernández (4–4) | Quantrill (0–2) | | 14,591 | 31–33 |
| 66 | June 10 | @ Marlins | 4–3 (10) | Person (1–0) | Powell (4–4) | Myers (16) | 16,994 | 32–33 |
| 67 | June 12 | Orioles | 9–5 | Mussina (5–3) | Guzmán (3–8) | | 30,237 | 32–34 |
| 68 | June 13 | Orioles | 9–8 | Person (2–0) | Drabek (5–7) | Myers (17) | 38,102 | 33–34 |
| 69 | June 14 | Orioles | 7–4 | Clemens (7–6) | Smith (0–1) | Myers (18) | 28,132 | 34–34 |
| 70 | June 15 | @ Devil Rays | 8–7 | White (1–3) | Quantrill (0–3) | Hernández (13) | 24,122 | 34–35 |
| 71 | June 16 | @ Devil Rays | 4–3 | Mecir (3–0) | Myers (2–2) | | 24,278 | 34–36 |
| 72 | June 17 | @ Devil Rays | 2–1 | Arrojo (9–4) | Guzmán (3–9) | Hernández (14) | 24,394 | 34–37 |
| 73 | June 18 | @ Orioles | 13–6 | Carpenter (3–2) | Johns (2–2) | | 47,374 | 35–37 |
| 74 | June 19 | @ Orioles | 7–4 (15) | Charlton (2–1) | Risley (0–4) | | 47,012 | 35–38 |
| 75 | June 20 | @ Orioles | 11–3 | Erickson (8–6) | Williams (7–3) | | 48,011 | 35–39 |
| 76 | June 21 | @ Orioles | 7–3 | Hentgen (8–4) | Ponson (1–5) | Myers (19) | 47,522 | 36–39 |
| 77 | June 22 | Expos | 14–2 | Guzmán (4–9) | Pavano (1–1) | | 33,132 | 37–39 |
| 78 | June 23 | Expos | 3–2 | Carpenter (4–2) | Batista (2–4) | Myers (20) | 33,492 | 38–39 |
| 79 | June 24 | @ Expos | 7–6 | Clemens (8–6) | Boskie (1–1) | Myers (21) | 16,515 | 39–39 |
| 80 | June 25 | @ Expos | 1–0 | Williams (8–3) | Pérez (6–7) | | 9,256 | 40–39 |
| 81 | June 26 | @ Braves | 6–4 | Hentgen (9–4) | Smoltz (5–2) | Myers (22) | 47,081 | 41–39 |
| 82 | June 27 | @ Braves | 2–0 | Maddux (11–2) | Guzmán (4–10) | | 48,338 | 41–40 |
| 83 | June 28 | @ Braves | 10–3 | Glavine (11–3) | Carpenter (4–3) | | 44,185 | 41–41 |
| 84 | June 30 | Mets | 6–3 | Clemens (9–6) | Reed (9–5) | | 30,322 | 42–41 |

July: 12–15 (Home: 9–4; Away: 3–12)

| # | Date | Opponent | Score | Win | Loss | Save | Attendance | Record |
|---|---|---|---|---|---|---|---|---|
| 85 | July 1 | Mets | 15–10 | Plesac (3–2) | Rojas (3–2) | | 37,252 | 43–41 |
| 86 | July 2 | Mets | 9–1 | Jones (7–5) | Hentgen (9–5) | | 27,325 | 43–42 |
| 87 | July 3 | Devil Rays | 3–2 (10) | Myers (3–2) | Yan (4–2) | | 25,625 | 44–42 |
| 88 | July 4 | Devil Rays | 8–0 | Carpenter (5–3) | Springer (2–11) | | 29,198 | 45–42 |
| 89 | July 5 | Devil Rays | 2–1 | Quantrill (1–3) | White (1–4) | Myers (23) | 31,240 | 46–42 |
| 90 | July 9 | @ Tigers | 4–3 | Anderson (2–0) | Plesac (3–3) | Jones (15) | 16,012 | 46–43 |
| 91 | July 10 | @ Tigers | 3–2 (10) | Jones (1–3) | Quantrill (1–4) | | 23,394 | 46–44 |
| 92 | July 11 | @ Tigers | 5–2 | Moehler (9–6) | Carpenter (5–4) | Runyan (1) | 21,072 | 46–45 |
| 93 | July 12 | @ Tigers | 7–2 | Clemens (10–6) | Brocail (4–2) | | 20,231 | 47–45 |
| 94 | July 13 | @ Orioles | 5–0 | Rodríguez (1–2) | Guzmán (4–11) | | 41,474 | 47–46 |
| 95 | July 14 | @ Orioles | 11–5 | Mussina (7–5) | Williams (8–4) | | 44,122 | 47–47 |
| 96 | July 15 | @ White Sox | 9–3 | Navarro (8–10) | Hentgen (9–6) | | | 47–48 |
| 97 | July 15 | @ White Sox | 5–2 | Castillo (4–4) | Stieb (0–1) | Simas (7) | 15,602 | 47–49 |
| 98 | July 16 | @ White Sox | 5–2 | Carpenter (6–4) | Baldwin (4–4) | Myers (24) | 19,638 | 48–49 |
| 99 | July 17 | Yankees | 9–6 | Clemens (11–6) | Holmes (0–2) | Myers (25) | 39,172 | 49–49 |
| 100 | July 18 | Yankees | 10–3 | Hernández (4–2) | Guzmán (4–12) | | 48,123 | 49–50 |
| 101 | July 19 | Yankees | 9–3 | Williams (9–4) | Pettitte (12–6) | | 42,176 | 50–50 |
| 102 | July 21 | White Sox | 6–3 | Baldwin (5–4) | Hentgen (9–7) | Simas (8) | 30,209 | 50–51 |
| 103 | July 22 | White Sox | 4–0 | Clemens (12–6) | Parque (2–3) | | 29,221 | 51–51 |
| 104 | July 23 | @ Red Sox | 8–7 (10) | Gordon (5–3) | Myers (3–3) | | 33,011 | 51–52 |
| 105 | July 24 | @ Red Sox | 10–6 | Guzmán (5–12) | Avery (7–3) | Quantrill (2) | 33,159 | 52–52 |
| 106 | July 25 | @ Red Sox | 5–3 | Lowe (1–7) | Williams (9–5) | Gordon (28) | 33,099 | 52–53 |
| 107 | July 26 | @ Red Sox | 6–3 | Martínez (14–3) | Hentgen (9–8) | | 33,059 | 52–54 |
| 108 | July 28 | Rangers | 8–3 | Clemens (13–6) | Sele (12–8) | | 29,177 | 53–54 |
| 109 | July 29 | Rangers | 9–6 | Oliver (6–7) | Carpenter (6–5) | Wetteland (28) | 28,220 | 53–55 |
| 110 | July 30 | Rangers | 1–0 | Guzmán (6–12) | Loaiza (0–2) | Myers (26) | 29,264 | 54–55 |
| 111 | July 31 | @ Twins | 6–4 | Rodriguez (1–0) | Williams (9–6) | Aguilera (27) | 26,054 | 54–56 |

August: 17–10 (Home: 11–5; Away: 6–5)

| # | Date | Opponent | Score | Win | Loss | Save | Attendance | Record |
|---|---|---|---|---|---|---|---|---|
| 112 | August 1 | @ Twins | 10–9 | Hentgen (10–8) | Hawkins (7–10) | Myers (27) | 17,128 | 55–56 |
| 113 | August 2 | @ Twins | 6–4 | Clemens (14–6) | Radke (10–9) | Myers (28) | 40,096 | 56–56 |
| 114 | August 4 | @ Rangers | 11–9 | Stottlemyre (1–0) | Carpenter (6–6) | Wetteland (29) | 45,213 | 56–57 |
| 115 | August 5 | @ Rangers | 4–3 | Wetteland (3–1) | Myers (3–4) | | 27,766 | 56–58 |
| 116 | August 7 | Athletics | 7–6 | Haynes (8–4) | Williams (9–7) | Fetters (5) | 31,286 | 56–59 |
| 117 | August 8 | Athletics | 6–5 (10) | Plesac (4–3) | Fetters (1–6) | | 31,330 | 57–59 |
| 118 | August 9 | Athletics | 4–3 | Quantrill (2–4) | Mohler (3–3) | | 30,114 | 58–59 |
| 119 | August 11 | Mariners | 7–4 | Carpenter (7–6) | Fassero (10–8) | Quantrill (3) | 33,137 | 59–59 |
| 120 | August 12 | Mariners | 11–5 | Rodríguez (2–3) | Ayala (1–8) | | 39,139 | 60–59 |
| 121 | August 13 | Angels | 4–3 | Risley (1–4) | Hasegawa (6–3) | Plesac (1) | 26,481 | 61–59 |
| 122 | August 14 | Angels | 7–5 | Watson (5–7) | Hentgen (10–9) | Percival (33) | 27,276 | 61–60 |
| 123 | August 15 | Angels | 6–3 (11) | DeLucia (2–4) | Sinclair (0–1) | | 30,379 | 61–61 |
| 124 | August 16 | Angels | 6–4 | Carpenter (8–6) | Juden (0–1) | Quantrill (4) | 29,259 | 62–61 |
| 125 | August 17 | @ Athletics | 4–2 | Escobar (2–1) | Candiotti (8–14) | Plesac (2) | 9,761 | 63–61 |
| 126 | August 18 | @ Athletics | 10–5 | Haynes (9–5) | Williams (9–8) | | 9,086 | 63–62 |
| 127 | August 19 | @ Mariners | 16–2 | Hentgen (11–9) | Cloude (7–9) | Stieb (1) | 26,258 | 64–62 |
| 128 | August 20 | @ Mariners | 7–0 | Clemens (15–6) | Swift (10–7) | | 26,642 | 65–62 |
| 129 | August 21 | @ Angels | 9–4 | Carpenter (9–6) | Juden (0–2) | | 36,052 | 66–62 |
| 130 | August 22 | @ Angels | 5–1 | Sparks (8–2) | Escobar (2–2) | Hasegawa (3) | 42,882 | 66–63 |
| 131 | August 23 | @ Angels | 3–2 | Finley (10–6) | Almanzar (1–1) | Percival (35) | 34,142 | 66–64 |
| 132 | August 24 | Royals | 7–3 | Barber (1–1) | Hentgen (11–10) | Whisenant (2) | 26,306 | 66–65 |
| 133 | August 25 | Royals | 3–0 | Clemens (16–6) | Haney (5–6) | | 26,173 | 67–65 |
| 134 | August 26 | Royals | 7–2 | Belcher (12–10) | Carpenter (9–7) | | 25,557 | 67–66 |
| 135 | August 27 | Royals | 11–1 | Escobar (3–2) | Rosado (7–10) | | 25,524 | 68–66 |
| 136 | August 28 | Twins | 7–6 | Williams (10–8) | Trombley (4–4) | Plesac (3) | 26,268 | 69–66 |
| 137 | August 29 | Twins | 14–7 | Stieb (1–1) | Radke (10–13) | | 30,101 | 70–66 |
| 138 | August 30 | Twins | 6–0 | Clemens (17–6) | Rodriguez (4–3) | | 29,202 | 71–66 |

September: 17–8 (Home: 10–2; Away: 7–6)

| # | Date | Opponent | Score | Win | Loss | Save | Attendance | Record |
|---|---|---|---|---|---|---|---|---|
| 139 | September 1 | @ Royals | 2–1 | Carpenter (10–7) | Belcher (12–11) | Quantrill (5) | 12,447 | 72–66 |
| 140 | September 2 | @ Royals | 5–0 | Escobar (4–2) | Rosado (7–11) | Quantrill (6) | 12,541 | 73–66 |
| 141 | September 3 | Red Sox | 4–3 (11) | Person (3–0) | Veras (0–1) | | 27,226 | 74–66 |
| 142 | September 4 | Red Sox | 12–1 | Hentgen (12–10) | Wakefield (15–7) | Stieb (2) | 29,166 | 75–66 |
| 143 | September 5 | Red Sox | 4–3 | Clemens (18–6) | Saberhagen (12–7) | Quantrill (7) | 37,158 | 76–66 |
| 144 | September 6 | Red Sox | 8–7 | Quantrill (3–4) | Lowe (3–9) | Person (1) | 38,374 | 77–66 |
| 145 | September 7 | Indians | 15–1 | Escobar (5–2) | Ogea (4–3) | | 31,089 | 78–66 |
| 146 | September 9 | Indians | 6–3 (13) | Jones (1–2) | Almanzar (1–2) | Jackson (37) | 32,157 | 78–67 |
| 147 | September 10 | @ Yankees | 8–5 | Pettitte (16–9) | Hentgen (12–11) | Holmes (2) | 25,881 | 78–68 |
| 148 | September 11 | @ Yankees | 5–4 | Almanzar (2–2) | Irabu (11–9) | Person (2) | 35,856 | 79–68 |
| 149 | September 12 | @ Yankees | 5–3 | Carpenter (11–7) | Wells (17–4) | Person (3) | 48,752 | 80–68 |
| 150 | September 13 | @ Yankees | 5–3 | Escobar (6–2) | Cone (19–6) | Person (4) | 47,471 | 81–68 |
| 151 | September 14 | @ Indians | 6–3 | Gooden (8–6) | Sinclair (0–2) | Jackson (39) | 43,152 | 81–69 |
| 152 | September 15 | @ Indians | 7–5 | Ogea (5–3) | Stieb (1–2) | Assenmacher (2) | 43,323 | 81–70 |
| 153 | September 16 | @ Tigers | 2–1 | Clemens (19–6) | Powell (3–8) | Person (5) | 10,967 | 82–70 |
| 154 | September 17 | @ Tigers | 7–4 | Brocail (5–2) | Person (3–1) | | 13,304 | 82–71 |
| 155 | September 18 | @ Devil Rays | 6–1 | Rekar (2–7) | Escobar (6–3) | | 32,053 | 82–72 |
| 156 | September 19 | @ Devil Rays | 7–5 | Lopez (7–3) | Van Ryn (0–1) | Hernández (26) | 35,689 | 82–73 |
| 157 | September 20 | @ Devil Rays | 7–5 (12) | Risley (2–4) | Lopez (7–4) | | 32,183 | 83–73 |
| 158 | September 21 | Orioles | 3–1 | Clemens (20–6) | Erickson (15–13) | Plesac (4) | 30,380 | 84–73 |
| 159 | September 22 | Orioles | 7–3 | Carpenter (12–7) | Mussina (13–9) | | 26,363 | 85–73 |
| 160 | September 23 | Orioles | 6–3 | Escobar (7–3) | Guzmán (10–16) | Person (6) | 28,147 | 86–73 |
| 161 | September 25 | Tigers | 7–5 | Moehler (14–13) | Williams (10–9) | Jones (28) | 33,151 | 86–74 |
| 162 | September 26 | Tigers | 5–4 (13) | Risley (3–4) | Sager (4–2) | | 40,268 | 87–74 |
| 163 | September 27 | Tigers | 2–1 | Halladay (1–0) | Thompson (11–15) | | 38,036 | 88–74 |

== Player stats ==
| = Indicates team leader |

=== Batting ===
==== Starters by position ====
Note: Pos = Position; G = Games played; AB = At bats; R = Runs; H = Hits; HR = Home runs; RBI = Runs batted in; Avg. = Batting average; Slg. = Slugging Average; SB = Stolen bases

| Pos | Player | G | AB | R | H | HR | RBI | Avg. | Slg. | SB |
|---|---|---|---|---|---|---|---|---|---|---|
| C | Darrin Fletcher | 124 | 407 | 37 | 115 | 9 | 52 | .283 | .410 | 0 |
| 1B | Carlos Delgado | 142 | 503 | 94 | 155 | 38 | 115 | .292 | .592 | 3 |
| 2B | Craig Grebeck | 102 | 301 | 33 | 77 | 2 | 27 | .256 | .346 | 2 |
| 3B | Ed Sprague Jr. | 105 | 382 | 49 | 91 | 17 | 51 | .238 | .424 | 0 |
| SS | Alex Gonzalez | 158 | 568 | 70 | 136 | 13 | 51 | .239 | .361 | 21 |
| LF | Shannon Stewart | 144 | 516 | 90 | 144 | 12 | 55 | .279 | .417 | 51 |
| CF | Jose Cruz Jr. | 105 | 352 | 55 | 89 | 11 | 42 | .253 | .403 | 11 |
| RF | Shawn Green | 158 | 630 | 106 | 175 | 35 | 100 | .278 | .510 | 35 |
| DH | Jose Canseco | 151 | 583 | 98 | 138 | 46 | 107 | .237 | .518 | 29 |

==== Other batters ====
Note: G = Games played; AB = At bats; H = Hits; Avg. = Batting average; HR = Home runs; RBI = Runs batted in

| Player | G | AB | H | Avg. | HR | RBI |
|---|---|---|---|---|---|---|
| Tony Fernández | 138 | 486 | 156 | .321 | 9 | 72 |
| Mike Stanley | 98 | 341 | 82 | .240 | 22 | 47 |
| Felipe Crespo | 66 | 130 | 34 | .262 | 1 | 15 |
| Kevin Brown | 52 | 110 | 29 | .264 | 2 | 15 |
| Mark Dalesandro | 32 | 67 | 20 | .299 | 2 | 14 |
| Juan Samuel | 43 | 50 | 9 | .180 | 1 | 2 |
| Tony Phillips | 13 | 48 | 17 | .354 | 1 | 7 |
| Benito Santiago | 15 | 29 | 9 | .310 | 0 | 4 |
| Tom Evans | 7 | 10 | 0 | .000 | 0 | 0 |
| Tomás Pérez | 6 | 9 | 1 | .111 | 0 | 0 |
| Kevin Witt | 5 | 7 | 1 | .143 | 0 | 0 |
| Patrick Lennon | 2 | 4 | 2 | .500 | 0 | 0 |

=== Pitching ===
| = Indicates league leader |

==== Starting pitchers ====
Note: G = Games pitched; IP = Innings pitched; W = Wins; L = Losses; ERA = Earned run average; SO = Strikeouts

| Player | G | IP | W | L | ERA | SO |
|---|---|---|---|---|---|---|
| Roger Clemens | 33 | 234.2 | 20* | 6 | 2.65 | 271 |
| Woody Williams | 32 | 209.2 | 10 | 9 | 4.46 | 151 |
| Pat Hentgen | 29 | 177.2 | 12 | 11 | 5.17 | 94 |
| Chris Carpenter | 33 | 175.0 | 12 | 7 | 4.37 | 136 |
| Juan Guzmán | 22 | 145.0 | 6 | 12 | 4.41 | 113 |
| Roy Halladay | 2 | 14.0 | 1 | 0 | 1.93 | 13 |

- Tied with David Cone (NYY) and Rick Helling (TEX)

==== Other pitchers ====
Note: G = Games pitched; IP = Innings pitched; W = Wins; L = Losses; ERA = Earned run average; SO = Strikeouts

| Player | G | IP | W | L | ERA | SO |
|---|---|---|---|---|---|---|
| Kelvim Escobar | 22 | 79.2 | 7 | 3 | 3.73 | 72 |
| Dave Stieb | 19 | 50.1 | 1 | 2 | 4.83 | 27 |
| Erik Hanson | 11 | 49.0 | 0 | 3 | 6.24 | 21 |

==== Relief pitchers ====
Note: G = Games pitched; W = Wins; L = Losses; SV = Saves; ERA = Earned run average; SO = Strikeouts

| Player | G | W | L | SV | ERA | SO |
|---|---|---|---|---|---|---|
| Randy Myers | 41 | 3 | 4 | 28 | 4.46 | 32 |
| Paul Quantrill | 82 | 3 | 4 | 7 | 2.59 | 59 |
| Dan Plesac | 78 | 4 | 3 | 4 | 3.78 | 55 |
| Bill Risley | 44 | 3 | 4 | 0 | 5.27 | 42 |
| Robert Person | 27 | 3 | 1 | 6 | 7.04 | 31 |
| Carlos Almanzar | 25 | 2 | 2 | 0 | 5.34 | 20 |
| Steve Sinclair | 24 | 0 | 2 | 0 | 3.60 | 8 |
| Ben Van Ryn | 10 | 0 | 1 | 0 | 9.00 | 3 |
| Nerio Rodriguez | 7 | 1 | 0 | 0 | 9.72 | 3 |
| Luis Andújar | 5 | 0 | 0 | 0 | 9.53 | 1 |
| Shannon Withem | 1 | 0 | 0 | 0 | 3.00 | 2 |

== Award winners ==
- José Canseco, DH, Silver Slugger Award
- Roger Clemens, Pitcher of the Month Award, August
- Roger Clemens, Cy Young Award
- Roger Clemens, MLB Leader Wins, 20
- Roger Clemens, AL Strikeout Crown, 271 Strikeouts
- Roger Clemens, AL ERA Crown, 2.65
- Roger Clemens, Major League Record, First Pitcher to win Five Cy Young Awards

All-Star Game

- Roger Clemens, P

== Farm system ==
| Level | Team | League | Manager |
|---|---|---|---|
| AAA | Syracuse SkyChiefs | International League | Terry Bevington |
| AA | Knoxville Smokies | Southern League | Omar Malavé |
| A | Dunedin Blue Jays | Florida State League | Rocket Wheeler |
| A | Hagerstown Suns | South Atlantic League | Marty Pevey |
| A-Short Season | St. Catharines Stompers | New York–Penn League | Duane Larson |
| Rookie | Medicine Hat Blue Jays | Pioneer League | Rolando Pino |
