= 1998 Cleveland Indians season =

1998 Cleveland Indians
- American League Central champions
- League: American League
- Division: Central
- Ballpark: Jacobs Field
- City: Cleveland, Ohio
- Record: 89–73 (.549)
- Divisional place: 1st
- Owner: Richard Jacobs
- General manager: John Hart
- Manager: Mike Hargrove
- Television: WUAB; Jack Corrigan, Mike Hegan; FSN Ohio; John Sanders, Rick Manning
- Radio: WKNR (1220 AM); Tom Hamilton, Dave Nelson, Matt Underwood, Mike Hegan

The 1998 Cleveland Indians season was the 98th season for the franchise and the 5th season at Jacobs Field. The Indians hoped to improve upon their American League pennant-winning season of 1997, but succumbed to the New York Yankees in the ALCS in six games. The Indians would lead the American League Central division wire-to-wire in 1998, becoming the first team in franchise history (and as of 2026, the only team in franchise history) to do so.

== Offseason ==
- November 12, 1997: Paul Assenmacher signed as a free agent.
- December 1: Matt Williams traded by Cleveland to the Arizona Diamondbacks for Travis Fryman, Tom Martin, and cash.
- December 8: Kenny Lofton and Dwight Gooden signed as free agents.
- December 8: Marquis Grissom and Jeff Juden traded by Cleveland to the Milwaukee Brewers for Mike Fetters, Ben McDonald, and Ron Villone.
- December 20: David Weathers was selected off waivers by the Cincinnati Reds from Cleveland.

== Regular season ==
=== Season standings ===
AL Central
Team	W	L	Pct.	GB	Home	Road
Cleveland Indians	89	73	.549	—	46‍–‍35	43‍–‍38
Chicago White Sox	80	82	.494	9	44‍–‍37	36‍–‍45
Kansas City Royals	72	89	.447	16½	29‍–‍51	43‍–‍38
Minnesota Twins	70	92	.432	19	35‍–‍46	35‍–‍46
Detroit Tigers	65	97	.401	24	32‍–‍49	33‍–‍48

=== Record vs. opponents ===
1998 American League record Source: MLB Standings Grid – 1998
Team	ANA	BAL	BOS	CWS	CLE	DET	KC	MIN	NYY	OAK	SEA	TB	TEX	TOR	NL
Anaheim	—	5–6	6–5	5–6	4–7	8–3	6–5	6–5	6–5	5–7	9–3	6–5	5–7	4–7	10–6
Baltimore	6–5	—	6–6	2–9	5–6	10–1	5–6	7–3	3–9	8–3	6–5	5–7	6–5	5–7	5–11
Boston	5–6	6–6	—	5–6	8–3	5–5	8–3	5–6	5–7	9–2	7–4	9–3	6–5	5–7	9–7
Chicago	6–5	9–2	6–5	—	6–6	6–6	8–4	6–6	4–7	4–7	4–7	5–6	5–6	4–6–1	7–9
Cleveland	7–4	6–5	3–8	6–6	—	9–3	8–4	6–6	4–7	3–8	9–2	7–3	4–7	7–4	10–6
Detroit	3–8	1–10	5–5	6–6	3–9	—	6–6	8–4	3–8	7–4	3–8	5–6	3–8	5–6	7–9
Kansas City	5–6	6–5	3–8	4–8	4–8	6–6	—	7–5	0–10	7–4	4–6	8–3	3–8	6–5	9–7
Minnesota	5–6	3–7	6–5	6–6	6–6	4–8	5–7	—	4–7	4–7	2–9	7–4	7–4	4–7	7–9
New York	5–6	9–3	7–5	7–4	7–4	8–3	10–0	7–4	—	8–3	8–3	11–1	8–3	6–6	13–3
Oakland	7–5	3–8	2–9	7–4	8–3	4–7	4–7	7–4	3–8	—	5–7	5–6	6–6	5–6	8–8
Seattle	3–9	5–6	4–7	7–4	2–9	8–3	6–4	9–2	3–8	7–5	—	6–5	5–7	4–7	7–9
Tampa Bay	5–6	7–5	3–9	6–5	3–7	6–5	3–8	4–7	1–11	6–5	5–6	—	4–7	5–7	5–11
Texas	7–5	5–6	5–6	6–5	7–4	8–3	8–3	4–7	3–8	6–6	7–5	7–4	—	7–4	8–8
Toronto	7–4	7–5	7–5	6–4–1	4–7	6–5	5–6	7–4	6–6	6–5	7–4	7–5	4–7	—	9–7

=== Transactions ===
- April 14, 1998: David Bell was selected off waivers by Cleveland from the St. Louis Cardinals.
- May 6, 1998: Mark Whiten signed as a free agent.
- June 2, 1998: CC Sabathia selected by Cleveland in the first round with the 20th overall pick of the 1998 MLB draft. Sabathia signed on June 29.
- July 2: Rex Hudler signed as a free agent.
- August 13: Cecil Fielder signed as a free agent.
- August 31: Bell traded by Cleveland to the Seattle Mariners for Joey Cora.
- September 18: Fielder released by Cleveland.

=== Roster ===
1998 Cleveland Indians
**Roster**
**Pitchers**: 45 Paul Assenmacher; 34 Dave Burba; 40 Bartolo Colón; 16 Dwight Gooden; 42 Mike Jackson; 46 Jason Jacome; 43 Doug Jones; 20 Steve Karsay; 30 Rick Krivda; 36 Tom Martin; 49 José Mesa; 51 Alvin Morman; 41 Charles Nagy; 37 Chad Ogea; 38 Eric Plunk; 62 Jim Poole; 59 Jason Rakers; 39 Steve Reed; 53 Paul Shuey; 47 Ron Villone; 33 Tim Worrell; 27 Jaret Wright	**Catchers**: 15 Sandy Alomar Jr.; 10 Pat Borders; 2 Einar Díaz; **Infielders**: 6 David Bell; 11 Jeff Branson; 66 Russell Branyan; 6 Jolbert Cabrera; 28 Joey Cora; 9 Shawon Dunston; 33 Cecil Fielder; 17 Travis Fryman; 9 Torey Lovullo; 12,26 Jeff Manto; 44 Richie Sexson; 25 Jim Thome; 13 Omar Vizquel; 35 Enrique Wilson	**Outfielders**: 29 Gerónimo Berroa; 22 Brian Giles; 23 David Justice; 7 Kenny Lofton; 61 Alex Ramírez; 24 Manny Ramírez; 12 Mark Whiten; **Other batters**: 51 Jacob Cruz; 33 Matt Luke	**Manager**: 30 Mike Hargrove; **Coaches**: 1 Al Bumbry (First base); 54 Johnny Goryl (Bench); 4 Luis Isaac (Bullpen); 32 Charlie Manuel (Hitting); 55 Jeff Newman (Third base); 28 Mark Wiley (Pitching); 43 Dan Williams (Bullpen catcher)

=== Game log ===
1998 Game Log: 89–73 (Home: 46–35; Away: 43–38)
March: 1–0 (Home: 0–0; Away: 1–0)

#	Date	Opponent	Score	Win	Loss	Save	Stadium	Attendance	Record	Streak
1	March 31	@ Mariners	10–9	**Mesa** (1–0)	Fossas (0–1)	**Jackson** (1)	Kingdome	57,822	1–0	W1

April: 13–12 (Home: 6–7; Away: 7–5)

#	Date	Opponent	Score	Win	Loss	Save	Stadium	Attendance	Record	Streak
2	April 1	@ Mariners	9–7	**Wright** (1–0)	Moyer (0–1)	**Jackson** (2)	Kingdome	24,523	2–0	W2
3	April 3	@ Angels	6–2	**Burba** (1–0)	McDowell (0–1)	–	Edison International Field of Anaheim	26,240	3–0	W3
4	April 4	@ Angels	11–0	**Colon** (1–0)	Watson (0–1)	–	Edison International Field of Anaheim	34,834	4–0	W4
5	April 5	@ Angels	6–4	**Nagy** (1–0)	Dickson (0–1)	**Jackson** (3)	Edison International Field of Anaheim	35,628	5–0	W5
–	April 6	@ Athletics	Suspended (curfew, continuation April 8)							
6	April 8	@ Athletics	6–5	**Krivda** (1–0)	Candiotti (0–2)	**Jackson** (4)	Network Associates Coliseum	6,963	6–0	W6
7	April 8	@ Athletics	1–3	Rogers (1–0)	**Burba** (1–1)	Taylor (1)	Network Associates Coliseum	8,361	6–1	L1
8	April 10	Angels	8–5 (10)	**Plunk** (1–0)	Percival (0–1)	–	**Jacobs Field**	42,707	7–1	W1
9	April 11	Angels	8–5	**Nagy** (2–0)	Dickson (0–2)	**Jackson** (5)	**Jacobs Field**	42,802	8–1	W2
10	April 12	Angels	1–12	Finley (2–0)	**Wright** (1–1)	–	**Jacobs Field**	42,555	8–2	L1
11	April 13	Mariners	6–5	**Burba** (2–1)	Cloude (1–1)	**Jackson** (6)	**Jacobs Field**	42,793	9–2	W1
12	April 14	Mariners	8–3	**Assenmacher** (1–0)	Slocumb (0–2)	–	**Jacobs Field**	40,490	10–2	W2
13	April 15	Mariners	3–5	Spoljaric (1–0)	**Assenmacher** (1–1)	Ayala (1)	**Jacobs Field**	40,527	10–3	L1
14	April 17	@ Red Sox	2–3 (10)	Gordon (2–1)	**Assenmacher** (1–2)	–	Fenway Park	26,924	10–4	L2
15	April 18	@ Red Sox	7–4	**Martin** (1–0)	Eckersley (1–1)	**Jackson** (7)	Fenway Park	31,735	11–4	W1
16	April 19	@ Red Sox	0–2	Saberhagen (3–0)	**Burba** (2–2)	Gordon (4)	Fenway Park	31,846	11–5	L1
17	April 20	@ Red Sox	5–6 (11)	Gordon (3–1)	**Plunk** (1–1)	–	Fenway Park	33,001	11–6	L2
18	April 21	White Sox	14–6	**Mesa** (2–0)	Baldwin (2–2)	–	**Jacobs Field**	42,836	12–6	W1
19	April 22	White Sox	7–14	Sirotka (3–1)	**Nagy** (2–1)	–	**Jacobs Field**	42,840	12–7	L1
20	April 23	White Sox	5–4	**Plunk** (2–1)	Castillo (0–1)	**Jackson** (8)	**Jacobs Field**	42,865	13–7	W1
21	April 24	Red Sox	5–7	Wakefield (1–1)	**Burba** (2–3)	Gordon (6)	**Jacobs Field**	40,570	13–8	L1
22	April 25	Red Sox	2–3	Saberhagen (4–0)	**Colon** (1–1)	Gordon (7)	**Jacobs Field**	40,571	13–9	L2
–	April 26	Red Sox	Postponed (rain, makeup July 21)							
23	April 27	@ White Sox	3–10	Sirotka (4–1)	**Ogea** (0–1)	–	Comiskey Park	13,575	13–10	L3
24	April 28	@ White Sox	4–1	**Nagy** (3–1)	Karchner (0–1)	**Jackson** (9)	Comiskey Park	13,208	14–10	W1
25	April 29	Athletics	4–11	Rogers (4–1)	**Wright** (1–2)	–	**Jacobs Field**	42,190	14–11	L1
26	April 30	Athletics	2–5	Mathews (3–3)	**Assenmacher** (1–3)	Taylor (6)	**Jacobs Field**	42,855	14–12	L2

May: 18–10 (Home: 10–3; Away: 8–7)

#	Date	Opponent	Score	Win	Loss	Save	Stadium	Attendance	Record	Streak
27	May 1	Devil Rays	7–5	**Colon** (2–1)	Springer (1–4)	**Jackson** (10)	**Jacobs Field**	42,712	15–12	W1
28	May 2	Devil Rays	5–1	**Ogea** (1–1)	Saunders (1–3)	–	**Jacobs Field**	42,525	16–12	W2
29	May 3	Devil Rays	10–8	**Mesa** (3–0)	R. Hernandez (0–2)	–	**Jacobs Field**	42,597	17–12	W3
30	May 5	Orioles	6–5	**Assenmacher** (2–3)	Benitez (1–1)	–	**Jacobs Field**	40,706	18–12	W4
31	May 6	Orioles	14–5	**Burba** (3–3)	Erickson (3–3)	–	**Jacobs Field**	40,672	19–12	W5
32	May 7	@ Rangers	7–2	**Colon** (3–1)	Sele (5–2)	–	The Ballpark in Arlington	28,504	20–12	W6
33	May 8	@ Rangers	3–6	X. Hernandez (1–0)	**Mesa** (3–1)	Wetteland (8)	The Ballpark in Arlington	38,067	20–13	L1
34	May 9	@ Rangers	3–7	Oliver (2–4)	**Nagy** (3–2)	–	The Ballpark in Arlington	46,355	20–14	L2
35	May 10	@ Rangers	3–5	Burkett (3–4)	**Wright** (1–3)	Wetteland (9)	The Ballpark in Arlington	31,232	20–15	L3
36	May 11	@ Devil Rays	2–4	Arrojo (5–2)	**Burba** (3–4)	R. Hernandez (4)	Tropicana Field	27,097	20–16	L4
37	May 12	@ Devil Rays	5–6 (14)	Santana (1–0)	**Jackson** (0–1)	–	Tropicana Field	27,084	20–17	L5
38	May 13	@ Orioles	1–8	Drabek (3–4)	**Ogea** (1–2)	–	Oriole Park at Camden Yards	43,379	20–18	L6
39	May 14	@ Orioles	5–4	**Nagy** (4–2)	Rhodes (2–2)	**Jackson** (11)	Oriole Park at Camden Yards	43,039	21–18	W1
40	May 15	Rangers	3–2 (14)	**Krivda** (2–0)	Levine (0–1)	–	**Jacobs Field**	41,128	22–18	W2
41	May 16	Rangers	10–3	**Burba** (4–4)	Witt (4–2)	–	**Jacobs Field**	40,925	23–18	W3
42	May 17	Rangers	0–1	Sele (7–2)	**Colon** (3–2)	Wetteland (12)	**Jacobs Field**	42,247	23–19	L1
43	May 19	@ Royals	16–3	**Ogea** (2–2)	Rapp (3–4)	–	Kauffman Stadium	13,367	24–19	W1
44	May 20	@ Royals	14–5	**Nagy** (5–2)	Belcher (2–6)	–	Kauffman Stadium	13,575	25–19	W2
45	May 21	@ Royals	6–2	**Wright** (2–3)	Rosado (0–4)	–	Kauffman Stadium	17,243	26–19	W3
46	May 22	Blue Jays	9–7	**Burba** (5–4)	Hanson (0–2)	**Jackson** (12)	**Jacobs Field**	43,269	27–19	W4
47	May 23	Blue Jays	2–7	Clemens (5–5)	**Colon** (3–3)	–	**Jacobs Field**	43,306	27–20	L1
48	May 24	Blue Jays	0–5	Williams (5–2)	**Gooden** (0–1)	–	**Jacobs Field**	43,194	27–21	L2
49	May 25	Tigers	7–4	**Nagy** (6–2)	Castillo (2–2)	–	**Jacobs Field**	43,342	28–21	W1
50	May 26	Tigers	9–2	**Wright** (3–3)	Worrell (2–6)	–	**Jacobs Field**	42,372	29–21	W2
51	May 28	@ Blue Jays	6–2	**Burba** (6–4)	Carpenter (1–1)	–	SkyDome	30,282	30–21	W3
52	May 29	@ Blue Jays	7–3	**Colon** (4–3)	Clemens (5–6)	–	SkyDome	29,085	31–21	W4
53	May 30	@ Blue Jays	2–4	Williams (6–2)	**Gooden** (0–2)	Myers (13)	SkyDome	37,179	31–22	L1
54	May 31	@ Blue Jays	8–3	**Nagy** (7–2)	Hentgen (7–4)	**Mesa** (1)	SkyDome	30,090	32–22	W1

June: 14–12 (Home: 7–8; Away: 7–4)

#	Date	Opponent	Score	Win	Loss	Save	Stadium	Attendance	Record	Streak
55	June 1	@ Tigers	2–0	**Wright** (4–3)	Florie (3–1)	–	Tiger Stadium	18,230	33–22	W2
56	June 2	@ Tigers	8–3	**Burba** (7–4)	Thompson (3–6)	–	Tiger Stadium	16,351	34–22	W3
57	June 3	@ Twins	2–3	Swindell (1–2)	**Colon** (4–4)	Aguilera (10)	Hubert H. Humphrey Metrodome	8,897	34–23	L1
58	June 4	@ Twins	3–2	**Gooden** (1–2)	Radke (7–4)	**Jackson** (13)	Hubert H. Humphrey Metrodome	9,417	35–23	W1
59	June 5	@ Reds	1–2	Harnisch (6–1)	**Nagy** (7–3)	Shaw (17)	Cinergy Field	43,532	35–24	L1
60	June 6	@ Reds	10–1	**Wright** (5–3)	Remlinger (3–7)	–	Cinergy Field	51,796	36–24	W1
61	June 7	@ Reds	6–1	**Burba** (8–4)	Klingenbeck (0–1)	–	Cinergy Field	49,589	37–24	W2
62	June 8	Pirates	8–0	**Colon** (5–4)	Peters (1–4)	–	**Jacobs Field**	43,068	38–24	W3
63	June 9	Pirates	4–7	Lieber (4–7)	**Morman** (0–1)	Rincon (6)	**Jacobs Field**	41,762	38–25	L1
64	June 10	Pirates	3–4 (11)	Loaiza (4–3)	**Mesa** (3–2)	Loiselle (12)	**Jacobs Field**	43,101	38–26	L2
–	June 12	@ Yankees	Postponed (rain, makeup September 21)							
–	June 13	@ Yankees	Postponed (rain, makeup September 22)							
65	June 14	@ Yankees	2–4	Cone (9–1)	**Wright** (5–4)	Rivera (13)	Yankee Stadium	42,949	38–27	L3
66	June 15	Royals	6–7 (10)	Montgomery (1–3)	**Mesa** (3–3)	Whisenant (1)	**Jacobs Field**	43,246	38–28	L4
67	June 16	Royals	9–1	**Colon** (6–4)	Pichardo (2–6)	–	**Jacobs Field**	43,184	39–28	W1
68	June 17	Royals	3–4	Rosado (3–5)	**Gooden** (1–3)	Montgomery (12)	**Jacobs Field**	43,196	39–29	L1
69	June 18	Yankees	2–5	Nelson (4–3)	**Assenmacher** (2–4)	Rivera (15)	**Jacobs Field**	43,096	39–30	L2
70	June 19	Yankees	7–4	**Wright** (6–4)	Cone (9–2)	**Jackson** (14)	**Jacobs Field**	43,180	40–30	W1
71	June 20	Yankees	3–5	Wells (9–2)	**Burba** (8–5)	Rivera (16)	**Jacobs Field**	43,259	40–31	L1
72	June 21	Yankees	11–0	**Colon** (7–4)	Irabu (6–3)	–	**Jacobs Field**	43,104	41–31	W1
73	June 22	@ Cubs	3–1	**Gooden** (2–3)	Tapani (8–6)	**Jackson** (15)	Wrigley Field	39,556	42–31	W2
74	June 23	@ Cubs	5–4	**Plunk** (3–1)	Adams (6–4)	**Jackson** (16)	Wrigley Field	39,006	43–31	W3
75	June 24	Cardinals	14–3	**Wright** (7–4)	Petkovsek (5–4)	–	**Jacobs Field**	43,321	44–31	W4
76	June 25	Cardinals	8–2	**Burba** (9–5)	Aybar (3–4)	–	**Jacobs Field**	43,309	45–31	W5
77	June 26	Astros	4–2	**Colon** (8–4)	Magnante (3–3)	**Jackson** (17)	**Jacobs Field**	43,222	46–31	W6
78	June 27	Astros	5–9 (11)	Wagner (2–2)	**Mesa** (3–4)	–	**Jacobs Field**	43,132	46–32	L1
79	June 28	Astros	3–12	Reynolds (9–5)	**Nagy** (7–4)	Nitkowski (3)	**Jacobs Field**	43,047	46–33	L2
80	June 30	@ Brewers	4–5	Eldred (4–5)	**Wright** (7–5)	Wickman (11)	County Stadium	16,012	46–34	L3

July: 16–12 (Home: 7–6; Away: 9–6)

#	Date	Opponent	Score	Win	Loss	Save	Stadium	Attendance	Record	Streak
81	July 1	@ Brewers	5–2	**Burba** (10–5)	Juden (7–7)	**Jackson** (18)	County Stadium	19,558	47–34	W1
82	July 2	@ Brewers	7–2	**Colon** (9–4)	Woodall (4–3)	–	County Stadium	21,022	48–34	W2
83	July 3	@ Royals	2–1	**Shuey** (1–0)	Rosado (3–6)	**Jackson** (19)	Kauffman Stadium	27,661	49–34	W3
84	July 4	@ Royals	3–5	Rapp (8–7)	**Nagy** (7–5)	Montgomery (18)	Kauffman Stadium	34,270	49–35	L1
85	July 5	@ Royals	12–3	**Wright** (8–5)	Rusch (6–10)	–	Kauffman Stadium	15,507	50–35	W1
–	July 7	69th All-Star Game	National League vs. American League (Coors Field, Denver, Colorado)							
86	July 9	Twins	0–3	Tewksbury (5–9)	**Burba** (10–6)	Aguilera (19)	**Jacobs Field**	43,236	50–36	L1
87	July 10	Twins	6–5	**Jackson** (1–1)	Trombley (3–3)	–	**Jacobs Field**	43,182	51–36	W1
88	July 11	Twins	12–2	**Gooden** (3–3)	Radke (9–7)	–	**Jacobs Field**	43,140	52–36	W2
89	July 12	Twins	6–11	Milton (5–7)	**Nagy** (7–6)	–	**Jacobs Field**	43,053	52–37	L1
90	July 13	Yankees	4–1	**Wright** (9–5)	Hernandez (3–2)	**Jackson** (20)	**Jacobs Field**	43,177	53–37	W1
91	July 14	Yankees	1–7	Pettitte (12–5)	**Burba** (10–7)	–	**Jacobs Field**	43,164	53–38	L1
92	July 15	@ Red Sox	0–1	Martinez (12–3)	**Colon** (9–5)	–	Fenway Park	33,501	53–39	L2
93	July 16	@ Red Sox	5–15	Wakefield (11–4)	**Gooden** (3–4)	Lowe (1)	Fenway Park	33,568	53–40	L3
94	July 17	@ White Sox	3–4	Simas (4–3)	**Shuey** (1–1)	–	Comiskey Park	27,733	53–41	L4
95	July 18	@ White Sox	15–9	**Shuey** (2–1)	Karchner (2–4)	**Jackson** (21)	Comiskey Park	26,067	54–41	W1
96	July 19	@ White Sox	1–8	Sirotka (9–9)	**Burba** (10–8)	–	Comiskey Park	23,543	54–42	L1
97	July 20	@ White Sox	5–4	**Colon** (10–5)	Navarro (8–11)	**Jackson** (22)	Comiskey Park	27,160	55–42	W1
98	July 21 (1)	Red Sox	7–10	Martinez (13–3)	**Gooden** (3–5)	Gordon (27)	**Jacobs Field**	42,874	55–43	L1
99	July 21 (2)	Red Sox	4–2 (8)	**Ogea** (3–2)	Wakefield (11–5)	**Jackson** (23)	**Jacobs Field**	43,227	56–43	W1
100	July 22	Red Sox	4–3	**Nagy** (8–6)	Garces (1–1)	**Jackson** (24)	**Jacobs Field**	43,073	57–43	W2
101	July 23	Tigers	2–3	Castillo (3–6)	**Wright** (9–6)	Jones (18)	**Jacobs Field**	43,085	57–44	L1
102	July 24	Tigers	2–1 (11)	**Reed** (3–1)	Bochtler (0–1)	–	**Jacobs Field**	43,156	58–44	W1
103	July 25	Tigers	6–5	**Colon** (11–5)	Greisinger (1–5)	**Jackson** (25)	**Jacobs Field**	43,094	59–44	W2
104	July 26	Tigers	1–8	Moehler (11–7)	**Gooden** (3–6)	–	**Jacobs Field**	43,055	59–45	L1
105	July 28	@ Mariners	4–3	**Nagy** (9–6)	Johnson (9–10)	**Jackson** (26)	Kingdome	31,124	60–45	W1
106	July 29	@ Mariners	8–7	**Ogea** (4–2)	McCarthy (0–1)	**Jackson** (27)	Kingdome	25,953	61–45	W2
107	July 30	@ Mariners	9–8 (17)	**Shuey** (3–1)	Wells (0–2)	–	Kingdome	31,081	62–45	W3
108	July 31	@ Athletics	2–12	Candiotti (6–13)	**Colon** (11–6)	–	Network Associates Coliseum	14,096	62–46	L1

August: 13–15 (Home: 8–7; Away: 5–8)

#	Date	Opponent	Score	Win	Loss	Save	Stadium	Attendance	Record	Streak
109	August 1	@ Athletics	5–6 (10)	Mathews (5–4)	**Karsay** (0–1)	–	Network Associates Coliseum	48,241	62–47	L2
110	August 2	@ Athletics	5–7	Mohler (3–2)	**Nagy** (9–7)	Taylor (23)	Network Associates Coliseum	27,712	62–48	L3
111	August 3	@ Angels	4–11	Sparks (5–2)	**Wright** (9–7)	–	Edison International Field of Anaheim	25,339	62–49	L4
112	August 4	@ Angels	4–5	Hasegawa (6–1)	**Jones** (3–5)	Percival (30)	Edison International Field of Anaheim	29,916	62–50	L5
113	August 5	@ Angels	6–5	**Shuey** (4–1)	Percival (2–5)	**Assenmacher** (1)	Edison International Field of Anaheim	43,104	63–50	W1
114	August 7	@ Devil Rays	5–1	**Gooden** (4–6)	Alvarez (5–10)	–	Tropicana Field	29,590	64–50	W2
115	August 8	@ Devil Rays	6–2	**Nagy** (10–7)	Rekar (1–4)	–	Tropicana Field	35,283	65–50	W3
116	August 9	@ Devil Rays	1–2	Mecir (4–2)	**Assenmacher** (2–5)	–	Tropicana Field	34,666	65–51	L1
117	August 11	Rangers	1–2	Loaiza (7–7)	**Karsay** (0–2)	Wetteland (32)	**Jacobs Field**	42,992	65–52	L2
118	August 12	Rangers	6–3	**Colon** (12–6)	Burkett (7–12)	**Jackson** (28)	**Jacobs Field**	43,247	66–52	W1
119	August 13	Orioles	4–7 (12)	Smith (5–5)	**Reed** (3–2)	Benitez (17)	**Jacobs Field**	43,217	66–53	L1
120	August 14	Orioles	3–15	Mussina (11–6)	**Nagy** (10–8)	–	**Jacobs Field**	43,169	66–54	L2
121	August 15	Orioles	8–9 (10)	Benitez (5–3)	**Jones** (3–6)	–	**Jacobs Field**	43,238	66–55	L3
122	August 16	Orioles	5–3	**Wright** (10–7)	Kamieniecki (2–5)	**Jackson** (29)	**Jacobs Field**	43,069	67–55	W1
123	August 17	Devil Rays	4–3	**Colon** (13–6)	Alvarez (5–12)	**Jackson** (30)	**Jacobs Field**	43,139	68–55	W2
124	August 18	Devil Rays	4–2	**Gooden** (5–6)	Rekar (1–5)	**Jackson** (31)	**Jacobs Field**	42,967	69–55	W3
125	August 19	@ Rangers	1–3	Sele (14–10)	**Nagy** (10–9)	Wetteland (33)	The Ballpark in Arlington	26,146	69–56	L1
126	August 20	@ Rangers	2–8	Stottlemyre (12–10)	**Burba** (10–9)	Patterson (2)	The Ballpark in Arlington	37,094	69–57	L2
127	August 21	@ Orioles	6–3	**Wright** (11–7)	Kamieniecki (2–6)	–	Oriole Park at Camden Yards	48,374	70–57	W1
128	August 22	@ Orioles	3–6	Erickson (14–9)	**Colon** (13–7)	–	Oriole Park at Camden Yards	48,138	70–58	L1
129	August 23	@ Orioles	4–1	**Gooden** (6–6)	Ponson (7–7)	**Jackson** (32)	Oriole Park at Camden Yards	48,272	71–58	W1
130	August 25	Mariners	10–4	**Nagy** (11–9)	Swift (10–8)	–	**Jacobs Field**	43,113	72–58	W2
131	August 26	Mariners	5–3	**Burba** (11–9)	Fassero (10–10)	**Jackson** (33)	**Jacobs Field**	43,091	73–58	W3
132	August 27	Mariners	4–10	Moyer (11–8)	**Wright** (11–8)	–	**Jacobs Field**	43,142	73–59	L1
133	August 28	Athletics	6–14 (10)	Heredia (2–0)	**Reed** (3–3)	–	**Jacobs Field**	43,191	73–60	L2
134	August 29	Athletics	6–11	Haynes (10–6)	**Martin** (1–1)	Taylor (28)	**Jacobs Field**	43,020	73–61	L3
135	August 30	Athletics	9–4	**Nagy** (12–9)	Rogers (12–7)	**Jackson** (34)	**Jacobs Field**	42,951	74–61	W1
136	August 31	Athletics	15–6	**Burba** (12–9)	Stein (5–8)	**Jones** (13)	**Jacobs Field**	42,897	75–61	W2

September: 14–12 (Home: 8–4; Away: 6–8)

#	Date	Opponent	Score	Win	Loss	Save	Stadium	Attendance	Record	Streak
137	September 1	Angels	7–6	**Reed** (4–3)	DeLucia (2–5)	–	**Jacobs Field**	43,184	76–61	W3
138	September 2	Angels	5–13	Sparks (9–2)	**Colon** (13–8)	–	**Jacobs Field**	43,200	76–62	L1
139	September 3	@ Tigers	2–1	**Gooden** (7–6)	Thompson (10–13)	**Jackson** (35)	Tiger Stadium	14,605	77–62	W1
140	September 4	@ Tigers	10–2	**Nagy** (13–9)	Greisinger (4–8)	–	Tiger Stadium	23,139	78–62	W2
141	September 5	@ Tigers	5–4	**Burba** (13–9)	Powell (3–6)	**Jackson** (36)	Tiger Stadium	30,031	79–62	W3
142	September 6	@ Tigers	2–3	Florie (7–9)	**Wright** (11–9)	Jones (23)	Tiger Stadium	32,815	79–63	L1
143	September 7	@ Blue Jays	1–15	Escobar (5–2)	**Ogea** (4–3)	–	SkyDome	31,089	79–64	L2
144	September 9	@ Blue Jays	6–3 (13)	**Jones** (4–6)	Almanzar (1–2)	**Jackson** (37)	SkyDome	32,157	80–64	W1
145	September 11	White Sox	2–3	Abbott (2–0)	**Nagy** (13–10)	Howry (6)	**Jacobs Field**	43,210	80–65	L1
146	September 12	White Sox	4–6	Baldwin (11–5)	**Shuey** (4–2)	Howry (7)	**Jacobs Field**	43,170	80–66	L2
147	September 13	White Sox	6–3	**Shuey** (5–2)	Ward (1–2)	**Jackson** (38)	**Jacobs Field**	43,178	81–66	W1
148	September 14	Blue Jays	6–3	**Gooden** (8–6)	Sinclair (0–2)	**Jackson** (39)	**Jacobs Field**	43,152	82–66	W2
149	September 15	Blue Jays	7–5	**Ogea** (5–3)	Stieb (1–2)	**Assenmacher** (2)	**Jacobs Field**	43,323	83–66	W3
150	September 16	Twins	8–6	**Nagy** (14–10)	Tewksbury (7–11)	**Assenmacher** (3)	**Jacobs Field**	43,277	84–66	W4
151	September 17	Twins	9–1	**Burba** (14–9)	Milton (7–13)	–	**Jacobs Field**	43,299	85–66	W5
152	September 18	Royals	4–1	**Wright** (12–9)	Appier (1–1)	**Shuey** (1)	**Jacobs Field**	43,260	86–66	W6
153	September 19	Royals	6–7	Service (6–3)	**Shuey** (5–3)	Montgomery (35)	**Jacobs Field**	43,182	86–67	L1
154	September 20	Royals	5–3	**Colon** (14–8)	Rapp (12–13)	**Jackson** (40)	**Jacobs Field**	43,082	87–67	W1
155	September 21	@ Yankees	4–1	**Nagy** (15–10)	Pettitte (16–11)	**Shuey** (2)	Yankee Stadium	21,449	88–67	W2
156	September 22 (1)	@ Yankees	4–10	Mendoza (10–2)	**Burba** (14–10)	–	Yankee Stadium	14,840	88–68	L1
157	September 22 (2)	@ Yankees	1–5	Irabu (13–9)	**Ogea** (5–4)	–	Yankee Stadium	32,315	88–69	L2
158	September 23	@ Yankees	4–8	Bradley (2–1)	**Jacome** (0–1)	–	Yankee Stadium	32,367	88–70	L3
159	September 24	@ Twins	0–2	Radke (12–14)	**Wright** (12–10)	Aguilera (38)	Hubert H. Humphrey Metrodome	7,800	88–71	L4
160	September 25	@ Twins	4–5	Aguilera (4–9)	**Shuey** (5–4)	–	Hubert H. Humphrey Metrodome	11,940	88–72	L5
161	September 26	@ Twins	9–5	**Burba** (15–9)	Tewksbury (7–13)	–	Hubert H. Humphrey Metrodome	28,764	89–72	W1
162	September 27	@ Twins	2–6	Milton (8–14)	**Colon** (14–9)	Trombley (1)	Hubert H. Humphrey Metrodome	12,049	89–73	L1

Legend: = Win = Loss = Postponement
Bold = Indians team member

== Player stats ==
=== Batting ===
==== Starters by position ====
Note: Pos = Position; G = Games played; AB = At bats; R = Runs; H = Hits; HR = Home runs; RBI = Runs batted in; Avg. = Batting average; Slg. = Slugging average; SB = Stolen bases

Pos	Player	G	AB	R	H	HR	RBI	Avg.	Slg.	SB
C	Sandy Alomar Jr.	117	409	45	96	6	44	.235	.352	0
1B	Jim Thome	123	440	89	129	30	85	.293	.584	1
2B	David Bell	107	340	37	89	10	41	.262	.424	0
3B	Travis Fryman	146	557	74	160	28	96	.287	.504	10
SS	Omar Vizquel	151	576	86	166	2	50	.288	.372	37
LF	Brian Giles	112	350	56	94	16	66	.269	.460	10
CF	Kenny Lofton	154	600	101	169	12	64	.282	.413	54
RF	Manny Ramirez	150	571	108	168	45	145	.294	.599	5
DH	David Justice	146	540	94	151	21	88	.280	.476	9

==== Other batters ====
Note: G = Games played; AB = At bats; H = Hits; Avg. = Batting average; HR = Home runs; RBI = Runs batted in

Player	G	AB	H	Avg.	HR	RBI
Mark Whiten	87	226	64	.283	6	29
Richie Sexson	49	174	54	.310	11	35
Pat Borders	54	160	38	.238	0	6
Shawon Dunston	62	156	37	.237	3	12
Jeff Branson	63	100	20	.200	1	9
Enrique Wilson	32	90	29	.322	2	12
Joey Cora	24	83	19	.229	0	6
Gerónimo Berroa	20	65	13	.200	0	3
Einar Díaz	17	48	11	.229	2	9
Jeff Manto	15	37	8	.216	2	6
Cecil Fielder	14	35	5	.143	0	0
Torey Lovullo	6	19	4	.211	0	1
Alex Ramírez	3	8	1	.125	0	0
Russell Branyan	1	4	0	.000	0	0
Jolbert Cabrera	1	2	0	.000	0	0
Matt Luke	2	2	0	.000	0	0
Jacob Cruz	1	1	0	.000	0	0

=== Pitching ===
==== Starting pitchers ====
Note: G = Games pitched; IP = Innings pitched; W = Wins; L = Losses; ERA = Earned run average; SO = Strikeouts

Player	G	IP	W	L	ERA	SO
Charles Nagy	33	210.1	15	10	5.22	120
Bartolo Colón	31	204.0	14	9	3.71	158
Dave Burba	32	203.2	15	10	4.11	132
Jaret Wright	32	192.2	12	10	4.72	140
Dwight Gooden	23	134.0	8	6	3.76	83
Jason Jacome	1	5.0	0	1	14.40	2

==== Other pitchers ====
Note: G = Games pitched; IP = Innings pitched; W = Wins; L = Losses; ERA = Earned run average; SO = Strikeouts

Player	G	IP	W	L	ERA	SO
Chad Ogea	19	69.0	5	4	5.61	43

==== Relief pitchers ====
Note: G = Games pitched; W = Wins; L = Losses; SV = Saves; ERA = Earned run average; SO = Strikeouts

Player	G	W	L	SV	ERA	SO
Mike Jackson	69	1	1	40	1.55	55
Paul Assenmacher	69	2	5	3	3.26	43
José Mesa	44	3	4	1	5.17	35
Paul Shuey	43	5	4	2	3.00	58
Eric Plunk	37	3	1	0	4.83	38
Alvin Morman	31	0	1	0	5.32	16
Ron Villone	25	0	0	0	6.00	15
Doug Jones	23	1	2	1	3.45	28
Steve Reed	20	2	2	0	6.66	23
Tom Martin	14	1	1	0	12.89	9
Jim Poole	12	0	0	0	5.14	11
Rick Krivda	11	2	0	0	3.24	10
Steve Karsay	11	0	2	0	5.92	13
Tim Worrell	3	0	0	0	5.06	2
Mark Whiten	1	0	0	0	9.00	3
Jason Rakers	1	0	0	0	9.00	0

== Award winners ==
All-Star Game

== Minor league affiliates ==
Classification level	Team	League
AAA	Buffalo Bisons	International League
AA	Akron Aeros	Eastern League
Advanced A	Kinston Indians	Carolina League
A	Columbus RedStixx	South Atlantic League
A-Short Season	Watertown Indians	New York–Penn League
Rookie	Burlington Indians	Appalachian League
