= 1998 Kansas City Royals season =

1998 Kansas City Royals
- League: American League
- Division: Central
- Ballpark: Kauffman Stadium
- City: Kansas City, Missouri
- Record: 72–89 (.447)
- Divisional place: 3rd
- Owners: David Glass
- General managers: Herk Robinson
- Managers: Tony Muser
- Television: KMBC-TV; KCWB; Fox Sports Rocky Mountain (Paul Splittorff, Bob Davis)
- Radio: WKBZ (Denny Matthews, Fred White)

The 1998 Kansas City Royals season was the 30th season for the franchise, and their 26th at Kauffman Stadium. The Royals finished third in the American League Central with a record of 72 wins and 89 losses and missed the postseason for the 13th consecutive season.

== Offseason ==
- November 18, 1997: Yamil Benitez was drafted by the Arizona Diamondbacks from the Kansas City Royals as the 19th pick in the 1997 expansion draft.
- January 20, 1998: Terry Pendleton was signed as a free agent with the Kansas City Royals.
- January 20, 1998: Lee Smith signed as a free agent with the Kansas City Royals.
- March 17, 1998: Ernie Young was purchased by the Kansas City Royals from the Oakland Athletics.

== Regular season ==
Before the 1998 regular season began, two new teams—the Arizona Diamondbacks and Tampa Bay Devil Rays—were added by Major League Baseball. This resulted in the American League and National League having fifteen teams. However, in order for MLB officials to continue primarily intraleague play, both leagues would need to carry a number of teams that was divisible by two, so the decision was made to move one club from the AL Central to the NL Central.

This realignment was widely considered to have great financial benefit to the club moving. However, to avoid the appearance of a conflict of interest, Commissioner (then club owner) Bud Selig decided another team should have the first chance to switch leagues. The choice was offered to the Kansas City Royals, who ultimately decided to stay in the American League and bypassing the opportunity to build a full-time rivalry with the St. Louis Cardinals. The choice then fell to the Brewers, who, on November 6, 1997, elected to move to the National League. Had the Brewers elected not to move to the National League, the Minnesota Twins would have been offered the opportunity to switch leagues.

=== Season standings ===
AL Central
Team	W	L	Pct.	GB	Home	Road
Cleveland Indians	89	73	.549	—	46‍–‍35	43‍–‍38
Chicago White Sox	80	82	.494	9	44‍–‍37	36‍–‍45
Kansas City Royals	72	89	.447	16½	29‍–‍51	43‍–‍38
Minnesota Twins	70	92	.432	19	35‍–‍46	35‍–‍46
Detroit Tigers	65	97	.401	24	32‍–‍49	33‍–‍48

=== Record vs. opponents ===
1998 American League record Source: MLB Standings Grid – 1998
Team	ANA	BAL	BOS	CWS	CLE	DET	KC	MIN	NYY	OAK	SEA	TB	TEX	TOR	NL
Anaheim	—	5–6	6–5	5–6	4–7	8–3	6–5	6–5	6–5	5–7	9–3	6–5	5–7	4–7	10–6
Baltimore	6–5	—	6–6	2–9	5–6	10–1	5–6	7–3	3–9	8–3	6–5	5–7	6–5	5–7	5–11
Boston	5–6	6–6	—	5–6	8–3	5–5	8–3	5–6	5–7	9–2	7–4	9–3	6–5	5–7	9–7
Chicago	6–5	9–2	6–5	—	6–6	6–6	8–4	6–6	4–7	4–7	4–7	5–6	5–6	4–6–1	7–9
Cleveland	7–4	6–5	3–8	6–6	—	9–3	8–4	6–6	4–7	3–8	9–2	7–3	4–7	7–4	10–6
Detroit	3–8	1–10	5–5	6–6	3–9	—	6–6	8–4	3–8	7–4	3–8	5–6	3–8	5–6	7–9
Kansas City	5–6	6–5	3–8	4–8	4–8	6–6	—	7–5	0–10	7–4	4–6	8–3	3–8	6–5	9–7
Minnesota	5–6	3–7	6–5	6–6	6–6	4–8	5–7	—	4–7	4–7	2–9	7–4	7–4	4–7	7–9
New York	5–6	9–3	7–5	7–4	7–4	8–3	10–0	7–4	—	8–3	8–3	11–1	8–3	6–6	13–3
Oakland	7–5	3–8	2–9	7–4	8–3	4–7	4–7	7–4	3–8	—	5–7	5–6	6–6	5–6	8–8
Seattle	3–9	5–6	4–7	7–4	2–9	8–3	6–4	9–2	3–8	7–5	—	6–5	5–7	4–7	7–9
Tampa Bay	5–6	7–5	3–9	6–5	3–7	6–5	3–8	4–7	1–11	6–5	5–6	—	4–7	5–7	5–11
Texas	7–5	5–6	5–6	6–5	7–4	8–3	8–3	4–7	3–8	6–6	7–5	7–4	—	7–4	8–8
Toronto	7–4	7–5	7–5	6–4–1	4–7	6–5	5–6	7–4	6–6	6–5	7–4	7–5	4–7	—	9–7

=== Roster ===
1998 Kansas City Royals
Roster
Pitchers: 17 Kevin Appier; 44 Brian Barber; 41 Tim Belcher; 47 Brian Bevil; 49 Ricky Bones; 55 Tim Byrdak; 45 Bart Evans; 33 Chris Haney; 55 Allen McDill; 21 Jeff Montgomery; 35 Hipólito Pichardo; 34 Jim Pittsley; 28 Pat Rapp; 51 Danny Rios; 50 José Rosado; 53 Glendon Rusch; 46 José Santiago; 48 Scott Service; 37 Jeff Suppan; 57 Jamie Walker; 56 Matt Whisenant	Catchers: 26 Sal Fasano; 15 Mike Macfarlane; 52 Héctor Ortiz; 12 Tim Spehr; 29 Mike Sweeney; 15 Chris Turner; Infielders: 43 Carlos Febles; 4 Shane Halter; 2 Jed Hansen; 7 Jeff King; 8 Scott Leius; 32 Mendy López; 14 Félix Martínez; 23 Hal Morris; 30 José Offerman; 16 Dean Palmer; 6 Terry Pendleton; 3 Luis Rivera	Outfielders: 46 Jermaine Allensworth; 36 Carlos Beltrán; 27 Dee Brown; 19 Jeff Conine; 18 Johnny Damon; 24 Jermaine Dye; 15 Jeremy Giambi; 51 Chris Hatcher; 31 Shane Mack; 22 Larry Sutton; 12 Ernie Young; Other batters: 27 Joe Vitiello	Manager: 40 Tony Muser; Coaches: 37 Rich Dauer (third base); 55 Guy Hansen; 54 Bruce Kison; 38 Tom Poquette; 9 Jamie Quirk (bench); 20 Frank White

== Player stats ==
=== Starters by position ===
Note: Pos = Position; G = Games played; AB = At bats; R = Runs; H = Hits; HR = Home runs; RBI = Runs batted in; Avg. = Batting average; Slg. = Slugging average; SB = Stolen bases

Pos	Player	G	AB	R	H	HR	RBI	Avg.	Slg.	SB
C	Mike Sweeney	92	282	32	73	8	35	.259	.408	2
1B	Jeff King	131	486	83	128	24	93	.263	.451	10
2B	José Offerman	158	607	102	191	7	66	.315	.438	45
3B	Dean Palmer	152	572	84	159	34	119	.278	.510	8
SS	Mendy López	74	206	18	50	1	15	.243	.325	5
LF	Jeff Conine	93	309	30	79	8	43	.256	.417	3
CF	Johnny Damon	161	642	104	178	18	66	.277	.439	26
RF	Larry Sutton	111	310	29	76	5	42	.245	.352	3
DH	Terry Pendleton	79	237	17	61	3	29	.257	.338	1

=== Other batters ===
Note: G = Games played; AB = At bats; H = Hits; Avg. = Batting average; HR = Home runs; RBI = Runs batted in

Player	G	AB	H	Avg.	HR	RBI
Hal Morris	127	472	146	.309	1	40
Larry Sutton	111	310	76	.245	5	42
Sal Fasano	74	216	49	.227	8	31
Shane Mack	66	207	58	.280	6	29
Shane Halter	86	204	45	.221	2	13
Luis Rivera	42	89	22	.247	0	7
Félix Martínez	34	85	11	.129	0	5
Jermaine Allensworth	30	73	15	.205	0	3
Jeremy Giambi	18	58	13	.224	2	8
Carlos Beltrán	14	58	16	.276	0	7
Ernie Young	25	53	10	.189	1	3
Scott Leius	17	46	8	.174	0	4
Tim Spehr	11	25	6	.240	1	2
Carlos Febles	11	25	10	.400	0	2
Chris Hatcher	8	15	1	.067	0	1
Mike Macfarlane	3	11	1	.091	0	0
Chris Turner	4	9	0	.000	0	0
Joe Vitiello	3	7	1	.143	0	0
Héctor Ortiz	4	4	0	.000	0	0
Jed Hansen	4	3	0	.000	0	0
Dee Brown	5	3	0	.000	0	0

=== Starting pitchers ===
Note: G = Games pitched; IP = Innings pitched; W = Wins; L = Losses; ERA = Earned run average; SO = Strikeouts

Player	G	IP	W	L	ERA	SO
Tim Belcher	34	234.0	14	14	4.27	130
Pat Rapp	32	188.1	12	13	5.30	132
José Rosado	38	174.2	8	11	4.69	135
Glendon Rusch	29	154.2	6	15	5.88	94
Brian Barber	8	42.0	2	4	6.00	24
Kevin Appier	3	15.0	1	2	7.80	9

==== Other pitchers ====
Note: G = Games pitched; IP = Innings pitched; W = Wins; L = Losses; ERA = Earned run average; SO = Strikeouts

Player	G	IP	W	L	ERA	SO
Hipólito Pichardo	27	112.1	7	8	5.13	55
Chris Haney	33	97.1	6	6	7.03	51
Jamie Walker	6	17.1	0	1	9.87	15
Jeff Suppan	4	12.2	0	0	0.71	12

===== Relief pitchers =====
Note: G = Games pitched; W = Wins; L = Losses; SV = Saves; ERA = Earned run average; SO = Strikeouts

Player	G	W	L	SV	ERA	SO
Jeff Montgomery	56	2	5	36	4.98	54
Scott Service	73	6	4	4	3.48	95
Matt Whisenant	70	2	1	2	4.90	45
Jim Pittsley	39	1	1	0	6.59	44
Brian Bevil	39	3	1	0	6.30	47
Ricky Bones	32	2	2	1	3.04	38
Bart Evans	8	0	0	0	3.00	7
Allen McDill	7	0	0	0	10.50	3
Danny Rios	5	0	1	0	6.14	6
Tim Byrdak	3	0	0	0	5.40	1
José Santiago	2	0	0	0	9.00	2
Shane Halter	1	0	0	0	0.00	0

== Farm system ==
Level	Team	League	Manager
AAA	Omaha Royals	Pacific Coast League	Ron Johnson
AA	Wichita Wranglers	Texas League	John Mizerock
A	Wilmington Blue Rocks	Carolina League	Darrell Evans, Kevin Long and Brian Poldberg
A	Lansing Lugnuts	Midwest League	Bob Herold
A-Short Season	Spokane Indians	Northwest League	Jeff Garber
Rookie	GCL Royals	Gulf Coast League	Andre David
