= 1998 Baltimore Orioles season =

Major League Baseball season

1998 Baltimore Orioles
- League: American League
- Division: East
- Ballpark: Oriole Park at Camden Yards
- City: Baltimore, Maryland
- Record: 79–83 (.488)
- Divisional place: 4th
- Owners: Peter Angelos
- General managers: Pat Gillick
- Managers: Ray Miller
- Television: WJZ-TV/WNUV; Home Team Sports (Jim Palmer, Michael Reghi, Rick Cerone)
- Radio: WBAL (AM) (Fred Manfra, Jim Hunter)

The 1998 Baltimore Orioles season was the 98th season in Baltimore Orioles franchise history, the 45th in Baltimore, and the 7th at Oriole Park at Camden Yards.

The Orioles finished fourth in the American League East with a record of 79 wins and 83 losses, the first of 14 consecutive losing seasons.

== Offseason ==
- December 11, 1997: Doug Drabek was signed as a free agent with the Baltimore Orioles.
- December 12, 1997: Joe Carter was signed as a free agent with the Baltimore Orioles.

== Regular season ==
Eddie
Murray
1B
Retired 1998
* From July 2 to August 15, Eric Davis hits in 30 consecutive games during which time he hits .400 (52 hits over 130 at-bats) with 10 home runs and 35 runs batted in.

- On September 13, 1998, Ryan Minor would make his Major League debut.
- The 1998 Baltimore Orioles season marks the last time a team other than the New York Yankees had the highest payroll in baseball until 2013, when New York was surpassed by the Los Angeles Dodgers.

=== Season standings ===
AL East
Team	W	L	Pct.	GB	Home	Road
New York Yankees	114	48	.704	—	62‍–‍19	52‍–‍29
Boston Red Sox	92	70	.568	22	51‍–‍30	41‍–‍40
Toronto Blue Jays	88	74	.543	26	51‍–‍30	37‍–‍44
Baltimore Orioles	79	83	.488	35	42‍–‍39	37‍–‍44
Tampa Bay Devil Rays	63	99	.389	51	33‍–‍48	30‍–‍51

=== Record vs. opponents ===
1998 American League record Source: MLB Standings Grid – 1998
Team	ANA	BAL	BOS	CWS	CLE	DET	KC	MIN	NYY	OAK	SEA	TB	TEX	TOR	NL
Anaheim	—	5–6	6–5	5–6	4–7	8–3	6–5	6–5	6–5	5–7	9–3	6–5	5–7	4–7	10–6
Baltimore	6–5	—	6–6	2–9	5–6	10–1	5–6	7–3	3–9	8–3	6–5	5–7	6–5	5–7	5–11
Boston	5–6	6–6	—	5–6	8–3	5–5	8–3	5–6	5–7	9–2	7–4	9–3	6–5	5–7	9–7
Chicago	6–5	9–2	6–5	—	6–6	6–6	8–4	6–6	4–7	4–7	4–7	5–6	5–6	4–6–1	7–9
Cleveland	7–4	6–5	3–8	6–6	—	9–3	8–4	6–6	4–7	3–8	9–2	7–3	4–7	7–4	10–6
Detroit	3–8	1–10	5–5	6–6	3–9	—	6–6	8–4	3–8	7–4	3–8	5–6	3–8	5–6	7–9
Kansas City	5–6	6–5	3–8	4–8	4–8	6–6	—	7–5	0–10	7–4	4–6	8–3	3–8	6–5	9–7
Minnesota	5–6	3–7	6–5	6–6	6–6	4–8	5–7	—	4–7	4–7	2–9	7–4	7–4	4–7	7–9
New York	5–6	9–3	7–5	7–4	7–4	8–3	10–0	7–4	—	8–3	8–3	11–1	8–3	6–6	13–3
Oakland	7–5	3–8	2–9	7–4	8–3	4–7	4–7	7–4	3–8	—	5–7	5–6	6–6	5–6	8–8
Seattle	3–9	5–6	4–7	7–4	2–9	8–3	6–4	9–2	3–8	7–5	—	6–5	5–7	4–7	7–9
Tampa Bay	5–6	7–5	3–9	6–5	3–7	6–5	3–8	4–7	1–11	6–5	5–6	—	4–7	5–7	5–11
Texas	7–5	5–6	5–6	6–5	7–4	8–3	8–3	4–7	3–8	6–6	7–5	7–4	—	7–4	8–8
Toronto	7–4	7–5	7–5	6–4–1	4–7	6–5	5–6	7–4	6–6	6–5	7–4	7–5	4–7	—	9–7

=== Notable transactions ===
- June 2, 1998: Cliff Lee was drafted by the Baltimore Orioles in the 20th round of the 1998 amateur draft, but did not sign.
- June 16, 1998: Rich Becker was selected off waivers by the Baltimore Orioles from the New York Mets.
- July 23, 1998: Joe Carter was traded by the Baltimore Orioles to the San Francisco Giants for Darin Blood (minors).

=== All good things must come to an end ===
In June, Cal Ripken Jr. began to contemplate ending his still-active, record-breaking streak of consecutive games played. However, the Orioles were still in contention for a wild-card spot in the playoffs at that point, so he continued playing. By mid-September, after the team fell out of wild-card contention, Ripken decided that, since the games that began his streak (May 30, 1982), tied Lou Gehrig's old record of 2,130 games (September 5, 1995) and surpassed it (September 6, 1995) all took place in his Baltimore hometown, it would be most appropriate to bring his incredible run to a close at home also. Thus, on September 20, after playing 2,632 games without a break, Cal Ripken Jr. asked to be taken out of the starting lineup for the Orioles' last home game of the season against the New York Yankees. Everybody was stunned when rookie Ryan Minor took third base instead of Ripken for the start of the game. The game's first batter, New York's Chuck Knoblauch, grounded out to shortstop for the first out, officially ending Ripken's streak and prompting both teams and the fans to give "The Iron Man" a thunderous ovation for his monumental achievement.

=== Roster ===
1998 Baltimore Orioles
Roster
Pitchers: 49 Armando Benítez; 28 Joel Bennett; 37 Norm Charlton; 27 Rocky Coppinger; 15 Doug Drabek; 28 Radhames Dykhoff; 19 Scott Erickson; 52 Chris Fussell; 57 Juan Guzmán; 55 Doug Johns; 30 Scott Kamieniecki; 21 Jimmy Key; 38 Richie Lewis; 51 Terry Mathews; 75 Alan Mills; 32 Bobby Muñoz; 35 Mike Mussina; 47 Jesse Orosco; 43 Sidney Ponson; 53 Arthur Rhodes; 39 Nerio Rodríguez; 26 Pete Smith	Catchers: 34,23 Charlie Greene; 23 Chris Hoiles; 42 Lenny Webster; Infielders: 12 Roberto Alomar; 14 Mike Bordick; 1 P. J. Forbes; 13 Ozzie Guillén; 13 Jerry Hairston Jr.; 10 Ryan Minor; 25 Rafael Palmeiro; 6 Calvin Pickering; 36 Jeff Reboulet; 8 Cal Ripken Jr.	Outfielders: 9 Brady Anderson; 18 Rich Becker; 29 Joe Carter; 41 Danny Clyburn; 24 Eric Davis; 11 Willie Greene; 11 Jeffrey Hammonds; 40 Gene Kingsale; 32 Lyle Mouton; 52 Willis Otáñez; 17 B. J. Surhoff; 32 Jesús Tavárez; Other batters: 3 Harold Baines	Manager: 31 Ray Miller; Coaches: 45 Carlos Bernhardt (first base); 48 Rick Down (hitting); 46 Mike Flanagan (pitching); 44 Elrod Hendricks (bullpen); 33 Eddie Murray (bench); 2 Sam Perlozzo (third base); 54 Sam Snider (bullpen catcher)

== Player stats ==
=== Batting ===
==== Starters by position ====
Note: Pos = Position; G = Games played; AB = At bats; H = Hits; Avg. = Batting average; HR = Home runs; RBI = Runs batted in

Pos	Player	G	AB	H	Avg.	HR	RBI
C	Chris Hoiles	97	267	70	.262	15	56
1B	Rafael Palmeiro	162	619	183	.296	43	121
2B	Roberto Alomar	147	588	166	.282	14	56
3B	Cal Ripken	161	601	163	.271	14	61
SS	Mike Bordick	151	465	121	.260	13	51
LF	B.J. Surhoff	162	573	160	.279	22	92
CF	Brady Anderson	133	479	113	.236	18	51
RF	Eric Davis	131	452	148	.327	28	89
DH	Harold Baines	104	293	88	.300	9	57

==== Other batters ====
Note: G = Games played; AB = At bats; H = Hits; Avg. = Batting average; HR = Home runs; RBI = Runs batted in

Player	G	AB	H	Avg.	HR	RBI
Lenny Webster	108	309	88	.285	10	46
Joe Carter	85	283	70	.247	11	34
Jeffrey Hammonds	63	171	46	.269	6	28
Jeff Reboulet	79	126	31	.246	1	8
Rich Becker	79	113	23	.204	3	11
Willie Greene	24	40	6	.150	1	5
Lyle Mouton	18	39	12	.308	2	7
Danny Clyburn	11	25	7	.280	1	3
Charlie Greene	13	21	4	.190	0	0
Calvin Pickering	9	21	5	.238	2	3
Ozzie Guillén	12	16	1	.063	0	0
Ryan Minor	9	14	6	.429	0	1
Jesús Tavárez	8	11	2	.182	1	1
P. J. Forbes	9	10	1	.100	0	2
Jerry Hairston Jr.	6	7	0	.000	0	0
Willis Otáñez	3	5	1	.200	0	0
Gene Kingsale	11	2	0	.000	0	0

=== Pitching ===
==== Starting pitchers ====
Note: G = Games pitched; IP = Innings pitched; W = Wins; L = Losses; ERA = Earned run average; SO = Strikeouts

Player	G	IP	W	L	ERA	SO
Scott Erickson	36	251.1	16	13	4.01	186
Juan Guzmán	33	211.0	10	16	4.35	168
Mike Mussina	29	206.1	13	10	3.49	175
Doug Drabek	23	108.2	6	11	7.29	55
Scott Kamieniecki	12	54.2	2	6	6.75	25

==== Other pitchers ====
Note: G = Games pitched; IP = Innings pitched; W = Wins; L = Losses; ERA = Earned run average; SO = Strikeouts

Player	G	IP	W	L	ERA	SO
Sidney Ponson	31	135.0	8	9	5.27	85
Doug Johns	31	86.2	3	3	4.57	34
Jimmy Key	25	79.1	6	3	4.20	53
Nerio Rodríguez	6	19.0	1	3	8.05	8
Rocky Coppinger	6	15.2	0	0	5.17	13
Bobby Muñoz	9	12.0	0	0	9.75	6
Chris Fussell	3	9.2	0	1	8.38	8
Richie Lewis	2	4.2	0	0	15.43	4

==== Relief pitchers ====
Note: G = Games pitched; W = Wins; L = Losses; SV = Saves; ERA = Earned run average; SO = Strikeouts

Player	G	W	L	SV	ERA	SO
Armando Benítez	71	5	6	22	3.82	87
Alan Mills	72	3	4	2	3.74	57
Jesse Orosco	69	4	1	7	3.18	50
Arthur Rhodes	45	4	4	4	3.51	83
Norm Charlton	36	2	1	0	6.94	41
Pete Smith	27	2	3	0	6.20	29
Terry Mathews	17	0	1	0	6.20	10
Joel Bennett	2	0	0	0	4.50	0
Radhames Dykhoff	1	0	0	0	18.00	1

== Farm system ==
Level	Team	League	Manager
AAA	Rochester Red Wings	International League	Marv Foley
AA	Bowie Baysox	Eastern League	Joe Ferguson
A	Frederick Keys	Carolina League	Tommy Shields
A	Delmarva Shorebirds	South Atlantic League	Dave Machemer
Rookie	Bluefield Orioles	Appalachian League	Andy Etchebarren
Rookie	GCL Orioles	Gulf Coast League	Butch Davis
