= Chris Hatcher (outfielder) =

American baseball player (born 1969)

- Outfielder
- Born: January 7, 1969 (age 57); Anaheim, California, U.S.
- Batted: Right Threw: Right

Professional debut
- MLB: September 6, 1998, for the Kansas City Royals
- KBO: April 10, 2002, for the Lotte Giants

Last appearance
- MLB: September 26, 1998, for the Kansas City Royals
- KBO: 2002, for the Lotte Giants

MLB statistics
- Games played: 8
- Hits: 1
- Batting average: .067

KBO statistics
- Games played: 25
- Hits: 11
- Batting average: .162
- Stats at Baseball Reference

Teams
- Kansas City Royals (1998); Lotte Giants (2002)

Christopher Kenneth Hatcher (born January 7, 1969) is an American former professional baseball outfielder in Major League Baseball (MLB) who played in eight games for the Kansas City Royals during its 1998 season. Listed at 6' 3", 220 lb., he batted and threw right handed.

Born and raised in Anaheim, California, Hatcher attended University of Iowa, where he played college baseball for the Hawkeyes baseball team.

In between, Hatcher played winterball for the Navegantes del Magallanes club of the Venezuelan League in the 1993-94 season, as well as for the Lotte Giants of the Korea Baseball Organization in 2002.

== Highlights ==
- 1998 Pacific Coast League Most Valuable Player
