= Shannon Withem =

American baseball player

- Pitcher
- Born: September 21, 1972 (age 53); Ann Arbor, Michigan, U.S.
- Batted: Right Threw: Right

Professional debut
- MLB: September 18, 1998, for the Toronto Blue Jays
- NPB: April 8, 1999, for the Nippon-Ham Fighters

Last appearance
- MLB: September 18, 1998, for the Toronto Blue Jays
- NPB: August 4, 1999, for the Nippon-Ham Fighters

MLB statistics
- Win–loss record: 0–0
- Earned run average: 3.00
- Strikeouts: 2

NPB statistics
- Win–loss record: 6–7
- Earned run average: 5.76
- Strikeouts: 31
- Stats at Baseball Reference

Teams
- Toronto Blue Jays (1998); Nippon-Ham Fighters (1999)

Shannon Bolt Withem (born September 21, 1972) is an American former professional baseball pitcher. He appeared in one game in Major League Baseball for the Toronto Blue Jays on September 18 during the 1998 season. Withem also pitched in Nippon Professional Baseball in 1999.

== Amateur career ==
Withem attended Willow Run High School in Ypsilanti, Michigan where he was an all-state pitcher for the Flyers baseball team. He had 7 no-hitters in high school and once struck out every batter in a 7-inning no-hitter.

== Professional career ==
Withem was drafted in the 5th round of the 1990 Major League Baseball draft by the Detroit Tigers. He pitched in the Tigers' organization until 1995, then spent the 1996–97 seasons in the New York Mets farm system. He was signed by the Blue Jays after the 1997 season. After going 17–5 with the Syracuse Chiefs, the Blue Jays' top farm team, he was called up in September. In his lone major league appearance, he pitched three innings in relief of Kelvim Escobar, giving up one run on three hits with two walks and two strikeouts.

After being released by the Blue Jays after the 1998 season, Withem signed with the Hokkaido Nippon-Ham Fighters in 1999. That season, he had a record of 6–7 with a 5.76 earned run average in 17 games. He was re-signed for the 2000 season, but hurt his elbow and did not pitch that season. The injury effectively ended his career, as he never again pitched professionally.

== After baseball ==
Withem is now a Software Sales Executive in Michigan.
