= 1998 Anaheim Angels season =

Major League Baseball season

1998 Anaheim Angels
- League: American League
- Division: West
- Ballpark: Edison International Field of Anaheim
- City: Anaheim, California
- Record: 85–77 (.525)
- Divisional place: 2nd
- Owner: Jackie Autry
- General manager: Bill Bavasi
- Manager: Terry Collins
- Television: Fox Sports West •Sparky Anderson, Steve Physioc; KCAL-9 •Jerry Reuss, Steve Physioc
- Radio: KLAC (AM 570) •Mario Impemba, Brian Barnhart; XPRS (Spanish) •José Tolentino, Ivan Lara
- Stats: ESPN.com; Baseball Reference

The 1998 Anaheim Angels season was the 38th season of the Anaheim Angels franchise in the American League, the 33rd in Anaheim, and their 33rd season playing their home games at Edison International Field of Anaheim. The Angels finished second in the American League West with a record of 85 wins and 77 losses.

== Offseason ==
- December 4, 1997: Greg Cadaret was signed as a free agent with the Anaheim Angels.
- December 19, 1997: Cecil Fielder signed as a free agent with the Anaheim Angels.
- December 22, 1997: Chip Hale signed as a free agent with the Anaheim Angels.
- January 9, 1998: Norberto Martin was signed as a free agent with the Anaheim Angels.
- January 10, 1998: William Van Landingham was signed as a free agent with the Anaheim Angels.
- January 26, 1998: Damon Mashore was signed as a free agent with the Anaheim Angels.
- February 27, 1998: Jack McDowell signed as a free agent with the Anaheim Angels.
- March 30, 1998: Chip Hale was traded by the Anaheim Angels to the St. Louis Cardinals for Craig Shipley.

== Regular season ==
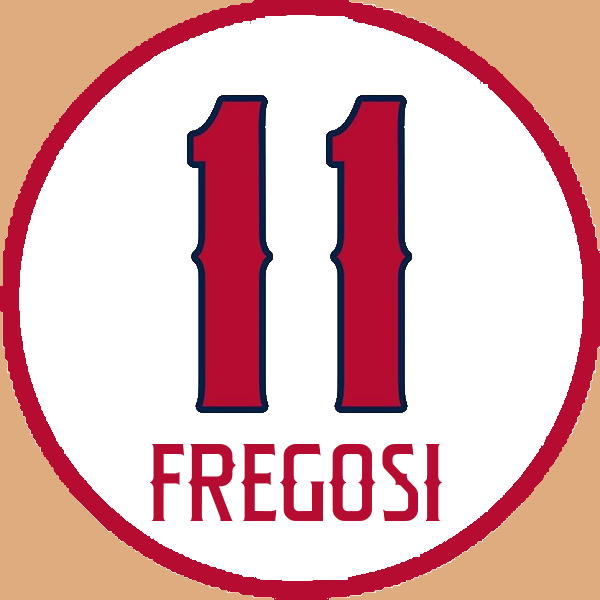
Jim Fregosi's number 11 was retired by the Anaheim Angels in 1998.

=== Season standings ===
AL West
Team	W	L	Pct.	GB	Home	Road
Texas Rangers	88	74	.543	—	48‍–‍33	40‍–‍41
Anaheim Angels	85	77	.525	3	42‍–‍39	43‍–‍38
Seattle Mariners	76	85	.472	11½	42‍–‍39	34‍–‍46
Oakland Athletics	74	88	.457	14	39‍–‍42	35‍–‍46

=== Record vs. opponents ===
1998 American League record Source: MLB Standings Grid – 1998
Team	ANA	BAL	BOS	CWS	CLE	DET	KC	MIN	NYY	OAK	SEA	TB	TEX	TOR	NL
Anaheim	—	5–6	6–5	5–6	4–7	8–3	6–5	6–5	6–5	5–7	9–3	6–5	5–7	4–7	10–6
Baltimore	6–5	—	6–6	2–9	5–6	10–1	5–6	7–3	3–9	8–3	6–5	5–7	6–5	5–7	5–11
Boston	5–6	6–6	—	5–6	8–3	5–5	8–3	5–6	5–7	9–2	7–4	9–3	6–5	5–7	9–7
Chicago	6–5	9–2	6–5	—	6–6	6–6	8–4	6–6	4–7	4–7	4–7	5–6	5–6	4–6–1	7–9
Cleveland	7–4	6–5	3–8	6–6	—	9–3	8–4	6–6	4–7	3–8	9–2	7–3	4–7	7–4	10–6
Detroit	3–8	1–10	5–5	6–6	3–9	—	6–6	8–4	3–8	7–4	3–8	5–6	3–8	5–6	7–9
Kansas City	5–6	6–5	3–8	4–8	4–8	6–6	—	7–5	0–10	7–4	4–6	8–3	3–8	6–5	9–7
Minnesota	5–6	3–7	6–5	6–6	6–6	4–8	5–7	—	4–7	4–7	2–9	7–4	7–4	4–7	7–9
New York	5–6	9–3	7–5	7–4	7–4	8–3	10–0	7–4	—	8–3	8–3	11–1	8–3	6–6	13–3
Oakland	7–5	3–8	2–9	7–4	8–3	4–7	4–7	7–4	3–8	—	5–7	5–6	6–6	5–6	8–8
Seattle	3–9	5–6	4–7	7–4	2–9	8–3	6–4	9–2	3–8	7–5	—	6–5	5–7	4–7	7–9
Tampa Bay	5–6	7–5	3–9	6–5	3–7	6–5	3–8	4–7	1–11	6–5	5–6	—	4–7	5–7	5–11
Texas	7–5	5–6	5–6	6–5	7–4	8–3	8–3	4–7	3–8	6–6	7–5	7–4	—	7–4	8–8
Toronto	7–4	7–5	7–5	6–4–1	4–7	6–5	5–6	7–4	6–6	6–5	7–4	7–5	4–7	—	9–7

=== Transactions ===
- July 30, 1998: Charlie O'Brien was traded by the Chicago White Sox to the Anaheim Angels for Brian Tokarse (minors) and Jason Stockstill (minors).
- August 7, 1998: Jeff Juden was selected off waivers by the Anaheim Angels from the Milwaukee Brewers.
- August 10, 1998: Cecil Fielder was released by the Anaheim Angels.
- August 26, 1998: Greg Cadaret was selected off waivers by the Texas Rangers from the Anaheim Angels.

=== Roster ===
1998 Anaheim Angels
Roster
Pitchers: 36 Greg Cadaret; 41 Rich DeLucia; 19 Jason Dickson; 36 Mike Fetters; 31 Chuck Finley; 48 Pep Harris; 21 Shigetoshi Hasegawa; 44 Ken Hill; 65 Mike Holtz; 46 Mike James; 33 Jeff Juden; 72 Jack McDowell; 39 Omar Olivares; 40 Troy Percival; 23 Rich Robertson; 23 Steve Sparks; 56 Jarrod Washburn; 34 Allen Watson; 17 Trevor Wilson	Catchers: 4 Chad Kreuter; 63 Bengie Molina; 20 Phil Nevin; 22 Charlie O'Brien; 6 Matt Walbeck; Infielders: 11,13 Justin Baughman; 32 Frank Bolick; 9 Gary DiSarcina; 45 Cecil Fielder; 12 Carlos García; 14 Troy Glaus; 10 Dave Hollins; 32 Mark Johnson; 7 Norberto Martin; 28 Chris Pritchett; 5 Craig Shipley; 18 Randy Velarde	Outfielders: 16 Garret Anderson; 25 Jim Edmonds; 27 Darin Erstad; 8 Todd Greene; 12 Gregg Jefferies; 22 Damon Mashore; 3 Orlando Palmeiro; 15 Tim Salmon; 55 Reggie Williams	Manager: 1 Terry Collins; Coaches: 2 Larry Bowa (Third Base); 29 Rod Carew (Hitting); 47 Joe Coleman (Bullpen); 24 George Hendrick (First Base); 53 Marcel Lachemann (Pitching); 70 Joe Maddon (Bench)

== Player stats ==
=== Starters by position ===
Note: Pos = Position; G = Games played; AB = At bats; R = Runs; H = Hits; HR = Home runs; RBI = Runs batted in; Avg. = Batting average; Slg. = Slugging Average; SB = Stolen bases

Pos	Player	G	AB	R	H	HR	RBI	Avg.	Slg.	SB
C	Matt Walbeck	108	338	41	87	6	46	.257	.367	1
1B	Cecil Fielder	103	381	48	92	17	68	.241	.423	0
2B	Justin Baughman	63	196	24	50	1	20	.255	.327	10
3B	Dave Hollins	101	363	60	88	11	39	.242	.388	11
SS	Gary DiSarcina	157	551	73	158	3	56	.287	.385	11
LF	Darin Erstad	133	537	84	159	19	82	.296	.486	20
CF	Jim Edmonds	154	599	115	184	25	91	.307	.506	7
RF	Garret Anderson	156	622	62	183	15	79	.284	.455	8
DH	Tim Salmon	136	463	84	139	26	88	.300	.533	0

=== Other batters ===
Note: G = Games played; AB = At bats; H = Hits; Avg. = Batting average; HR = Home runs; RBI = Runs batted in

Player	G	AB	H	Avg.	HR	RBI
Phil Nevin	75	237	54	.228	8	27
Norberto Martin	79	195	42	.215	1	13
Randy Velarde	51	188	49	.261	4	26
Orlando Palmeiro	75	165	53	.321	0	21
Troy Glaus	48	165	36	.218	1	23
Craig Shipley	77	147	38	.259	2	17
Damon Mashore	43	98	23	.235	2	11
Chris Pritchett	31	80	23	.288	2	8
Greg Jefferies	19	72	25	.347	1	10
Todd Greene	29	71	18	.254	1	7
Frank Bolick	21	45	7	.156	1	2
Reggie Williams	29	36	13	.361	1	5
Carlos García	19	35	5	.143	0	0
Mark Johnson	10	14	1	.071	0	0
Charlie O'Brien	5	11	2	.182	0	0
Chad Kreuter	3	7	1	.143	0	0
Bengie Molina	2	1	0	.000	0	0

=== Starting pitchers ===
Note: G = Games pitched; IP = Innings pitched; W = Wins; L = Losses; ERA = Earned run average; SO = Strikeouts

Player	G	IP	W	L	ERA	SO
Chuck Finley	34	223.1	11	9	3.39	212
Omar Olivares	37	183.0	9	9	4.03	112
Steve Sparks	22	128.2	9	4	4.34	90
Ken Hill	19	103.0	9	6	4.98	57
Jack McDowell	14	76.0	5	3	5.09	45
Jarrod Washburn	15	74.0	6	3	4.62	48
Jeff Juden	8	40.0	1	3	6.75	39

==== Other pitchers ====
Note: G = Games pitched; IP = Innings pitched; W = Wins; L = Losses; ERA = Earned run average; SO = Strikeouts

Player	G	IP	W	L	ERA	SO
Jason Dickson	27	122.0	10	10	6.05	61
Allen Watson	28	92.1	6	7	6.04	64

===== Relief pitchers =====
Note: G = Games pitched; W = Wins; L = Losses; SV = Saves; ERA = Earned run average; SO = Strikeouts

Player	G	W	L	SV	ERA	SO
Troy Percival	67	2	7	42	3.65	87
Shigetoshi Hasegawa	61	8	3	5	3.14	73
Rich DeLucia	61	2	6	3	4.27	73
Mike Holtz	53	2	2	1	4.75	29
Pep Harris	49	3	1	0	4.35	34
Greg Cadaret	39	1	2	1	4.14	37
Trevor Wilson	15	0	0	0	3.52	6
Mike Fetters	12	1	2	0	5.56	9
Mike James	11	0	0	0	1.93	12
Rich Robertson	5	0	0	0	15.88	3

== Farm system ==
Level	Team	League	Manager
AAA	Vancouver Canadians	Pacific Coast League	Mitch Seoane
AA	Midland Angels	Texas League	Don Long
A	Lake Elsinore Storm	California League	Mario Mendoza
A	Cedar Rapids Kernels	Midwest League	Garry Templeton
A-Short Season	Boise Hawks	Northwest League	Tom Kotchman
Rookie	Butte Copper Kings	Pioneer League	Bill Lachemann

Records
Preceded by 1997	Anaheim Angels seasons 1998	Succeeded by 1999
