= Bart Evans (baseball) =

American baseball player (born 1970)

- Pitcher
- Born: December 30, 1970 (age 55); Springfield, Missouri, U.S.
- Batted: Right Threw: Right

MLB debut
- June 16, 1998, for the Kansas City Royals

Last MLB appearance
- August 27, 1998, for the Kansas City Royals

MLB statistics
- Win–loss record: 0–0
- Earned run average: 2.00
- Strikeouts: 7

Teams
- Kansas City Royals (1998)

Bart Evans (born December 30, 1970) is an American former Major League Baseball pitcher. He was born in Springfield, Missouri. He attended college at Missouri State University and was drafted by the Kansas City Royals in the 9th round of the 1992 MLB draft. Bart pitched 8 career games with and ERA of 2.00. Bart married and had two children, Abbey(12) and Andrew(16) who also plays Baseball.
