= Félix Martínez (baseball) =

Dominican baseball player (born 1974)

Felix Martínez
- Shortstop
- Born: May 18, 1974 (age 52); Nagua, Dominican Republic
- Batted: Switch Threw: Right

MLB debut
- September 3, 1997, for the Kansas City Royals

Last MLB appearance
- September 30, 2001, for the Tampa Bay Devil Rays

MLB statistics
- Batting average: .214
- Home runs: 3
- Runs batted in: 39
- Stats at Baseball Reference

Teams
- Kansas City Royals (1997–1999); Tampa Bay Devil Rays (2000–2001)

Félix Martínez Mata (born May 18, 1974) is a Dominican former Major League Baseball (MLB) shortstop for the Kansas City Royals and Tampa Bay Devil Rays.
