= Mark Dalesandro =

American baseball player (born 1968)

- Catcher / Third baseman
- Born: May 14, 1968 (age 57); Chicago, Illinois, U.S.
- Batted: Right Threw: Right

MLB debut
- June 6, 1994, for the California Angels

Last MLB appearance
- August 10, 2001, for the Chicago White Sox

MLB statistics
- Batting average: .240
- Home runs: 3
- Runs batted in: 17
- Stats at Baseball Reference

Teams
- California Angels (1994–1995); Toronto Blue Jays (1998–1999); Chicago White Sox (2001)

Mark Anthony Dalesandro (born May 14, 1968) is an American former Major League Baseball (MLB) catcher and third baseman. He is an alumnus of Chicago's St. Ignatius College Prep (1986) and the University of Illinois at Urbana-Champaign.

== Career ==
Drafted by the California Angels in the 18th round of the 1990 MLB amateur draft out of Illinois, Dalesandro would make his Major League Baseball debut with the California Angels on June 6, 1994, and appear in his final game on August 10, 2001.

Dalesandro played for the California Angels (1994-1995), Toronto Blue Jays (1998-1999) and Chicago White Sox (2001).

After his playing career, Dalesandro became President of Baseball/Softball Operations with Elite Sports Performance.
