= Kevin Brown (catcher) =

American baseball player (born 1973)

- Catcher
- Born: April 21, 1973 (age 52); Valparaiso, Indiana, U.S.
- Batted: Right Threw: Right

MLB debut
- September 12, 1996, for the Texas Rangers

Last MLB appearance
- September 22, 2002, for the Boston Red Sox

MLB statistics
- Batting average: .254
- Home runs: 7
- Runs batted in: 31
- Stats at Baseball Reference

Teams
- Texas Rangers (1996–1997); Toronto Blue Jays (1998–1999); Milwaukee Brewers (2000–2001); Boston Red Sox (2002)

Kevin Lee Brown (born April 21, 1973) is an American former Major League Baseball catcher who spent parts of seven seasons (1996 to 2002) with four MLB teams but who never got into more than a handful of MLB games each season except for 1998 with the Toronto Blue Jays, for whom he played 52 games that season. He finished his career with a .254 batting average with a .311 on base average and .450 slugging percentage in 85 games.

== Professional career ==
=== Texas Rangers ===
Brown was drafted 56th overall in the second round of the 1994 Major League Baseball draft, by the Texas Rangers. He advanced quickly through the minors, batting .261 with 43 home runs in 306 games in from 1994 and 1996.

Brown made his Major League debut in the 9th inning of a blowout loss against the Milwaukee Brewers on September 12, 1996. He was struck out by Alberto Reyes in his only plate appearance of the game.

Brown spent the majority of 1997 on Texas' AAA affiliate, the Oklahoma City 89ers, where he posted a .241 batting average with 19 home runs.

=== Toronto Blue Jays ===
With only about 2 weeks left before the start of the 1998 season, Brown was traded to the Toronto Blue Jays for relief pitcher Tim Crabtree. Brown spent 1998 as a backup for Toronto's newly acquired starting catcher, Darrin Fletcher. During this time he batted .254 with 2 home runs during 52 games in the Majors.

=== Milwaukee Brewers ===
On July 25, 2000, Brown was traded to the Milwaukee Brewers for outfield prospect Alvin Morrow. Between the 2000 and 2001 seasons, Brown played a total of 22 games with Milwaukee, with the rest of his time spent with the AAA Indianapolis Indians.

After the 2001 season, Brown was granted free agency. On January 24, 2002, he signed a minor league contract with the Tampa Bay Devil Rays.

=== Tampa Bay Devil Rays ===
After playing only 6 games with Tampa Bay's AAA affiliate, the Durham Bulls, he was released from the team in favor of other catching prospects Paul Hoover and Toby Hall.

During his brief stint with Durham, Brown bat .150, with 2 of his 3 hits being home runs.

=== Boston Red Sox ===
Three days after being cut, Brown signed with the Boston Red Sox. Brown was assigned to Boston's AAA affiliate, the Pawtucket Red Sox, where he became the team's starting catcher in 2002. Despite his success in AAA, Brown only made 1 plate appearance at the Major League level. This would also be the last Major League appearance of his career.

Brown was granted free agency on October 14, 2002.

=== St. Louis Cardinals ===
Brown signed a minor league contract with the St. Louis Cardinals, but would only appear in 7 games for their A+ affiliate, the Palm Beach Cardinals. He was released on August 1, 2003.

== Personal life ==
After retiring from professional baseball, Brown coached for his alma mater, the University of Southern Indiana.

Brown's son Logan was drafted by the Atlanta Braves in the 35th round of the 2018 Major League Baseball draft.
