= Juan Guzmán (baseball) =

Dominican baseball player (born 1966)

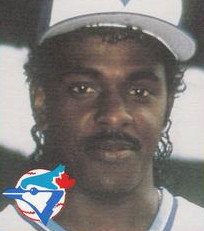
- Guzman in 1988
- Pitcher
- Born: October 28, 1966 (age 59); Santo Domingo, Dominican Republic
- Batted: Right Threw: Right

MLB debut
- June 7, 1991, for the Toronto Blue Jays

Last MLB appearance
- April 7, 2000, for the Tampa Bay Devil Rays

MLB statistics
- Win–loss record: 91–79
- Earned run average: 4.08
- Strikeouts: 1,243
- Stats at Baseball Reference

Teams
- Toronto Blue Jays (1991–1998); Baltimore Orioles (1998–1999); Cincinnati Reds (1999); Tampa Bay Devil Rays (2000)

Career highlights and awards
- All-Star (1992); 2× World Series champion (1992, 1993); AL ERA leader (1996)

Juan Andres Guzmán Correa (born October 28, 1966) is a Dominican former professional baseball pitcher who played ten seasons in Major League Baseball (MLB). He spent most of his playing career with the Toronto Blue Jays and was part of their World Series winning teams in 1992 and 1993.

== Career ==
Guzmán was originally signed by the Los Angeles Dodgers as an amateur free agent in 1985. In late 1987, he was traded to the Toronto Blue Jays for Mike Sharperson. In his first three seasons with the Blue Jays, he went a combined 40–11 with a 3.28 ERA. The Jays made the playoffs all three years, winning the World Series in 1992 and 1993. Guzmán won two games in both the 1992 and 1993 ALCS, but did not secure a win in either World Series. His playoff record was 5–1 in eight starts, with a 2.44 ERA.

Guzmán had an ERA of 2.93 in 1996, the lowest in the American League among qualified pitchers. Guzmán had a very good fastball, striking out 7.5 batters per nine innings during his career. He led the American league in wild pitches in 1993 and 1994. On July 31, 1998, the Jays traded him to the Baltimore Orioles for Shannon Carter and Nerio Rodriguez. On July 31, 1999, Guzmán and cash were traded to the Cincinnati Reds for B. J. Ryan and Jacobo Sequea.

He signed as a free agent with the Tampa Bay Devil Rays in 2000 and pitched one game, giving up eight runs in 1.2 innings. It was his last appearance. Guzmán finished his career with an ERA of 4.08.

== See also ==
- List of Major League Baseball annual ERA leaders

Preceded by Randy Johnson	AL hits per nine innings 1996	Succeeded by Randy Johnson
