= Woody Williams =

American baseball player (born 1966)

- Pitcher
- Born: August 19, 1966 (age 59); Houston, Texas, U.S.
- Batted: Right Threw: Right

MLB debut
- May 14, 1993, for the Toronto Blue Jays

Last MLB appearance
- September 22, 2007, for the Houston Astros

MLB statistics
- Win–loss record: 132–116
- Earned run average: 4.19
- Strikeouts: 1,480
- Stats at Baseball Reference

Teams
- Toronto Blue Jays (1993–1998); San Diego Padres (1999–2001); St. Louis Cardinals (2001–2004); San Diego Padres (2005–2006); Houston Astros (2007)

Career highlights and awards
- All-Star (2003)

Gregory Scott "Woody" Williams (born August 19, 1966) is an American baseball coach and former pitcher. He played in Major League Baseball (MLB) for the Toronto Blue Jays, San Diego Padres, St. Louis Cardinals, and Houston Astros.

== Baseball career ==
Williams, a Cy-Fair High School graduate and University of Houston alumnus, began his career pitching in relief for the Toronto Blue Jays until he was moved to a full-time starter in 1997. On December 12, 1998, he was traded to the San Diego Padres with minor leaguer Peter Tucci and Carlos Almanzar for right-handed pitcher Joey Hamilton. He worked exclusively as a starter in San Diego. In 2001, he began the season with an 8–8 win–loss record with a 4.97 ERA in 23 starts.

On August 2, 2001, he was traded to the St. Louis Cardinals for outfielder Ray Lankford, whereupon he went 7–1 with a 2.28 ERA in 11 starts.

On August 10, 2003, Williams became the first big-league pitcher to hit into an unassisted triple play, in which Atlanta Braves shortstop Rafael Furcal became the 12th major-leaguer to make one of the rarest plays in baseball. He continued to pitch well for St. Louis, making the 2003 All-Star Game and starting Game 1 of the 2004 World Series.

After the 2004 season ended, Williams filed for free agency; he signed back with the Padres on December 9, 2004.

On November 24, 2006, the Houston Astros announced they had signed Williams to a two-year, $12.5 million contract, at the same press conference announcing the Carlos Lee signing.

After a career-worst 2007 season with Houston, where he went 8–15 with a 5.27 ERA, and a poor showing during the 2008 spring training, Williams was released by the Astros on March 29 and subsequently retired.

As a hitter, Williams was better than average for a pitcher, posting a .194 batting average (105-for-540) with four home runs and 43 runs batted in.

Williams is one of only 24 pitchers to earn a victory against all 30 MLB teams.

== Pitching style ==
Williams' best pitch was a cut fastball that he could throw from 89 to 92 mph. He relied on his curveball as his strikeout pitch, used a straight changeup as well, and threw an occasional knuckleball.

== Personal life ==
He lives in Houston with his wife and five children: Katelyn, Sarah, Hannah, Caden, and Lillian. His cousin Chase Ortiz was a defensive end for the Winnipeg Blue Bombers of the Canadian Football League. Williams began coaching varsity baseball at Fort Bend Baptist Academy in 2009, and led the team to the Texas Class 4A semifinals in 2010 and 2011.
