= Luis Saturria =

Dominican baseball player (born 1976)

- Outfielder
- Born: July 21, 1976 (age 48); San Pedro de Macorís, Dominican Republic
- Batted: Right Threw: Right

MLB debut
- September 11, 2000, for the St. Louis Cardinals

Last MLB appearance
- October 5, 2001, for the St. Louis Cardinals

MLB statistics
- Batting average: .100
- Home runs: 0
- Runs batted in: 1
- Stats at Baseball Reference

Teams
- St. Louis Cardinals (2000–2001)

Luis Arturo Saturria (born July 21, 1976) is a Dominican former Major League Baseball outfielder for the St. Louis Cardinals (2000-2001).

Saturria was signed by the St. Louis Cardinals as a free agent on March 5, 1994. After hitting .274 with Single-A Peoria in 1997, the Toronto Blue Jays selected him in the 1997 Rule 5 draft, but returned him in spring training in 1998. Assigned to the High-A Prince William Cannons of the Carolina League, he was named to the Carolina League All-Star team and batted .294 with 12 home runs and 73 RBI.

Saturria's best professional season came in 2000 for the Double-A Arkansas Travelers. He hit .274 with 20 home runs and 76 RBI and was selected to play for the World Team in the All-Star Futures Game. He also earned a September call up to the Cardinals. With the Cardinals, he went hitless in 5 at-bats. He had another brief stint in the majors in 2001, but spent all of 2002 in the minors. In 2003, he played for the Long Island Ducks of the independent Atlantic League.
