= Jason Rakers =

American baseball player (born 1973)

- Pitcher
- Born: June 29, 1973 (age 52); Pittsburgh, Pennsylvania
- Batted: Right Threw: Right

MLB debut
- May 6, 1998, for the Cleveland Indians

Last MLB appearance
- June 5, 2000, for the Kansas City Royals

MLB statistics
- Win–loss record: 2–0
- Earned run average: 8.76
- Strikeouts: 16
- Stats at Baseball Reference

Teams
- Cleveland Indians (1998–1999); Kansas City Royals (2000)

Jason Paul Rakers (born June 29, 1973) is an American former professional baseball player. A pitcher, Rakers played for the Cleveland Indians in 1998 and 1999, and the Kansas City Royals in 2000. He last played professional baseball in 2003 with both the Akron Aeros and Buffalo Bisons.

A native of Pittsburgh, Pennsylvania, Rakers attended the University of Pittsburgh and New Mexico State University. In 1993, he played collegiate summer baseball with the Brewster Whitecaps of the Cape Cod Baseball League. He was selected by the Indians in the 25th round of the 1995 MLB draft.
