= Jimmy Haynes =

American baseball player (born 1972)

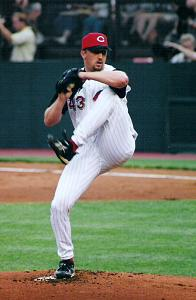
- Pitcher
- Born: September 5, 1972 (age 53); LaGrange, Georgia, U.S.
- Batted: Right Threw: Right

MLB debut
- September 13, 1995, for the Baltimore Orioles

Last MLB appearance
- May 4, 2004, for the Cincinnati Reds

MLB statistics
- Win–loss record: 63–89
- Earned run average: 5.37
- Strikeouts: 762
- Stats at Baseball Reference

Teams
- Baltimore Orioles (1995–1996); Oakland Athletics (1997–1999); Milwaukee Brewers (2000–2001); Cincinnati Reds (2002–2004)

Jimmy Wayne Haynes (born September 5, 1972) is an American former professional baseball right-handed pitcher. He played in Major League Baseball (MLB) from 1995 to 2004 for the Baltimore Orioles, Oakland Athletics, Milwaukee Brewers, and Cincinnati Reds.

== Career ==
Haynes was selected by the Baltimore Orioles in the 7th round of the 1991 Major League Baseball draft. He made his Major League Baseball (MLB) debut in the 1995 season and was later sent to the Oakland Athletics.

After playing for the Athletics (1997–1999) and Milwaukee Brewers (2000–2001), Haynes won 15 games for the Reds in 2002. Haynes was released from the Reds in 2004, after 5 appearances. He pitched his final season in 2005 for the Tampa Bay Devil Rays Triple-A affiliate, the Durham Bulls.

In his major league career, Haynes had a win–loss record of 63–89, with 762 strikeouts and an earned run average (ERA) of 5.37, which is the worst ERA of all time among pitchers who have pitched at least 1000 innings.
