= Billy Taylor (1990s pitcher) =

American baseball player (born 1961)

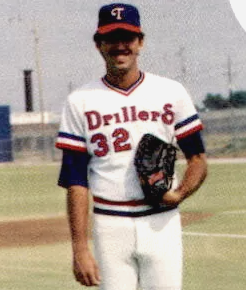
- Taylor with the Tulsa Drillers c. 1984
- Pitcher
- Born: October 16, 1961 (age 64); Monticello, Florida, U.S.
- Batted: Right Threw: Right

MLB debut
- April 5, 1994, for the Oakland Athletics

Last MLB appearance
- April 8, 2001, for the Pittsburgh Pirates

MLB statistics
- Win–loss record: 16–28
- Earned run average: 4.21
- Strikeouts: 307
- Saves: 100
- Stats at Baseball Reference

Teams
- Oakland Athletics (1994, 1996–1999); New York Mets (1999); Tampa Bay Devil Rays (2000); Pittsburgh Pirates (2001)

William Howell Taylor (born October 16, 1961) is an American former professional baseball player who pitched in Major League Baseball (MLB) primarily as a closer from 1994 and 1996 to 2001.

== Early career ==
Taylor played his first professional game in 1980 after being drafted by the Texas Rangers in the second round (39th overall pick) of the 1980 draft. Initially drafted as a starter, in 1981, he went 4–2 with a 2.72 earned run average (ERA) at the Rookie level. However, he struggled after a promotion to Single-A, going just 1–7 with a 4.64 ERA. Over the next two seasons, used as a combination reliever/starter, he went 13–18 with a 5.54 ERA. He did strike out 212 batters. In 1984, used in 42 games, he re-established his prospect status with a 5–3 record and a 3.83 ERA in Double-A. In 1985, he topped 100 innings pitched for the first time in his career, and he also had a 3.47 ERA. He then threw 169 innings between AA and Triple-A and pitched fairly well with a 4.36 ERA between the two stops. He was only 24 years old. The next season, he pitched poorly, going 12–9 with a 5.61 ERA. Again, he threw about 170 innings. The next year, Taylor got injured and started only 11 games with an ERA of 5.49. Granted free agency by the Rangers, he signed in 1989 with the San Diego Padres, who needed depth in their bullpen. He appeared in 49 games in AAA, with again a high ERA of 5.13.

=== First success ===
By 1990, Taylor's career appeared to be over. He was 28 years old and had pitched poorly in AAA as both a starter and a reliever. However, the Atlanta Braves signed him in the middle of August 1990, seeing that his walk rate in 1989 was the lowest it had been in his minor league career. He appeared in 7 games that season. In 1991, no one could have predicted that he would go 6–2 in 59 games as a reliever with a 1.51 ERA in AA, morphing into one of the best closers in that league. 1992 was more of the same for Taylor. He went 2–3 with a 2.28 ERA and 12 saves. In 1993, at the age of 31, he was an All-Star, saved 26 games, struck out more than a batter an inning, and had a 1.98 ERA, all in AAA. He won the league's reliever of the year award as well.

== Major League career ==
In 1994, a full 14 years after Billy Taylor had been drafted, he finally played in the big leagues. With a 3.50 ERA, he was arguably the most important reliever in the Oakland Athletics' bullpen. From 1996 to 1999, Taylor saved 100 games. His best season came in 1998, where he had 33 saves (eighth in the AL), and a 3.58 ERA. On July 31, 1999, he was traded by the Oakland Athletics to the New York Mets for Jason Isringhausen and Greg McMichael. He then played for the Mets, Tampa Bay Devil Rays, and Pittsburgh Pirates before retiring from baseball.
