= Ken Cloude =

American baseball player (born 1975)

- Pitcher
- Born: January 9, 1975 (age 51); Baltimore, Maryland, U.S.
- Batted: Right Threw: Right

MLB debut
- August 9, 1997, for the Seattle Mariners

Last MLB appearance
- October 3, 1999, for the Seattle Mariners

MLB statistics
- Win–loss record: 16–16
- Earned run average: 6.56
- Strikeouts: 195
- Stats at Baseball Reference

Teams
- Seattle Mariners (1997–1999)

Kenneth Brian Cloude (born January 9, 1975) is a former professional baseball pitcher for the Seattle Mariners of Major League Baseball from 1997 to 1999.

The Mariners drafted Cloude in the sixth round of the 1993 MLB draft out of McDonogh School in Owings Mills, Maryland. He had been named the Player of the Year by the Baltimore Sun in 1992. He was the winning pitcher in the Lancaster JetHawks first home game at the Hangar. He was named the Single-A team's most valuable player after the season by the Mariners. He primarily threw his fastball with Lancaster. He was a California League mid-season and postseason All-Star and named the best fielding pitcher by league managers. He began 1997 with the Memphis Chicks and was named a Southern League All-Star.

Cloude made his major league debut on August 9 1997, pitching 5 1/3 perfect innings before taking the loss against the Chicago White Sox. Cloude won his second, beating the Baltimore Orioles as part of a double-header at Camden Yards. He went 4–2 in his rookie season with a 5.12 ERA. Cloude was in Seattle's starting rotation in 1998 and finished the season with a disastrous 6.37 ERA in 30 starts. He had a 8–10 record, with relievers blowing the lead four times after he left games. His final MLB season in 1999 was worse, as Cloude had a 7.96 ERA in 31 games. He split time between Seattle and the Triple-A Tacoma Rainiers. He started 2000 in Tacoma, but his season ended in June with an elbow injury. He had Tommy John surgery in August. He missed the 2001 season, also having surgery to repair a torn Achilles tendon. Cloude said he began having elbow problems in 1999. He re-signed with the Mariners in 2002, returning to Tacoma. He suffered elbow bursitis that season. He pitched for Tacoma in 2003, then joined the Durham Bulls for four games in 2004.

== Personal life ==
Cloude was born in Baltimore, Maryland and lived in Baltimore during his playing career.
