= José Rosado =

American baseball player (born 1974)

New York Mets – No. 67
- Pitcher
- Born: November 9, 1974 (age 51); Jersey City, New Jersey, U.S.
- Batted: Left Threw: Left

MLB debut
- June 12, 1996, for the Kansas City Royals

Last MLB appearance
- April 30, 2000, for the Kansas City Royals

MLB statistics
- Win–loss record: 37–45
- Earned run average: 4.27
- Strikeouts: 484
- Stats at Baseball Reference

Teams
- Kansas City Royals (1996–2000); As coach: New York Mets (2024–present)

Career highlights and awards
- 2× All-Star (1997, 1999)
Medals
Men's baseball
Representing Puerto Rico
World Baseball Classic
Silver medal – second place	2013 San Francisco	Team

Jose Antonio Rosado (born November 9, 1974) is a former Major League Baseball pitcher who played for the Kansas City Royals from 1996 to 2000. He is currently the bullpen coach for the New York Mets. He played and coached for the Puerto Rico national baseball team.

== Playing career ==
He was drafted by the Royals in the 12th round of the 1994 amateur draft. He made his major league debut on June 12,1996, earning a loss against the California Angels. He came in fourth in American League Rookie of the Year voting despite having only made 16 starts. He also gave up Paul Molitor's 3,000th career hit on September 16, 1996. Rosado was the winning pitcher in the 1997 MLB All-Star Game despite blowing a save by giving up a home run to Javy López. He would also play in the 1999 All Star Game, again as the lone representative of the Royals. Of trivial note, Rosado's two All-Star Games were also the first two Midsummer Classics to be broadcast on Fox.

Rosado's career was effectively ended in 2000. After five starts, he was diagnosed with shoulder tendinitis. After rehabilitation, Rosado had a separate surgery to repair a superior labral tear. He did not pitch in affiliated baseball again.

== Coaching career ==
Rosado was named the Mets bullpen coach on December 4, 2023. Rosado previously coached in the New York Yankees minor league system from 2011 to 2020. He was the pitching coach for GCL Yankees in 2011, coaching alongside future Mets manager Carlos Mendoza. He coached the GCL Yankees until 2014 and was the pitching coach of the Double-A Trenton Thunder from 2015 to 2017 and the High-A affiliate Tampa Tarpons in 2018.

He was the pitching coach for Team Puerto Rico in the World Baseball Classic in both 2013 and 2017, helping the team to a second-place finish in both years.

== Personal life ==
Rosado is of Puerto Rican descent.
