= Carlos Almanzar =

Dominican baseball player (born 1973)

Carlos Almánzar
- Relief pitcher
- Born: November 6, 1973 (age 51); Santiago, Dominican Republic
- Batted: Right Threw: Right

MLB debut
- September 4, 1997, for the Toronto Blue Jays

Last MLB appearance
- April 30, 2005, for the Texas Rangers

MLB statistics
- Win–loss record: 13–13
- Earned run average: 4.82
- Strikeouts: 170
- Stats at Baseball Reference

Teams
- Toronto Blue Jays (1997–1998); San Diego Padres (1999–2000); New York Yankees (2001); Cincinnati Reds (2002); Texas Rangers (2004–2005)

Carlos Manuel Almánzar Girón (born November 6, 1973) is a Dominican former professional baseball pitcher. He played in Major League Baseball (MLB) for the Toronto Blue Jays, San Diego Padres, New York Yankees, Cincinnati Reds, and Texas Rangers. He has also pitched in the minor leagues for the Atlanta Braves and Boston Red Sox.

== Career ==
Almanzar was involved in an infamous incident involving some Rangers teammates and Oakland Athletics fans on September 13, 2004, that ultimately resulted in teammate Frank Francisco throwing a chair into the stands and hitting a fan, causing her to suffer a cut. He was suspended briefly for the incident.

On October 4, 2005, Almanzar, who had missed most of the 2005 season due to a torn elbow ligament that required Tommy John surgery to repair, was suspended for 10 days by MLB authorities for failing a steroids test. He indicated that he would appeal the suspension.

In 2008, Almanzar did not play for any team during the regular season, but did play for Leones del Escogido in the Dominican Winter League where he was 2–0 with a 1.80 ERA after 6 appearances.

== Personal life ==
Almanzar's son, Michael Almanzar, is also professional baseball player.

== See also ==
- List of sportspeople sanctioned for doping offences
