= Nerio Rodríguez =

Dominican baseball player (born 1971)

Nerio Rodriguez
- Starting pitcher
- Born: March 4, 1971 (age 55); Baní, Dominican Republic
- Batted: Right Threw: Right

Professional debut
- MLB: August 18, 1996, for the Baltimore Orioles
- NPB: June 20, 2003, for the Osaka Kintetsu Buffaloes
- CPBL: August 27, 2005, for the La New Bears

Last appearance
- MLB: August 29, 2002, for the St. Louis Cardinals
- NPB: August 10, 2003, for the Osaka Kintetsu Buffaloes
- CPBL: October 11, 2009, for the Uni-President 7-Eleven Lions

Career statistics
- Win–loss record: 4–6
- Earned run average: 6.32
- Strikeouts: 38

NPB statistics
- Win–loss record: 3–2
- Earned run average: 6.61
- Strikeouts: 13

CPBL statistics
- Win–loss record: 4–5
- Earned run average: 4.79
- Strikeouts: 57
- Stats at Baseball Reference

Teams
- Baltimore Orioles (1996–1998); Toronto Blue Jays (1998–1999); Cleveland Indians (2002); St. Louis Cardinals (2002); Osaka Kintetsu Buffaloes (2003); La New Bears (2005); Chinatrust Whales (2008); Uni-President 7-Eleven Lions (2009)

Career highlights and awards
- Taiwan Series champion (2009)
Medals
Men's baseball
Representing Dominican Republic
Central American and Caribbean Games
Gold medal – first place	2010 Mayagüez	Team

Nerio Rodríguez Delgado (born March 4, 1971) is a Dominican former professional baseball player. A pitcher, Rodríguez played Major League Baseball from 1996 to 1999 for the Baltimore Orioles and Toronto Blue Jays. In 2002, he played for the St. Louis Cardinals and Cleveland Indians.

In 2007, Rodríguez played in the Mexican League and had a 13–3 record with an ERA of 2.62, enough to earn an all-star berth and pitcher of the year honors. He was even better in 2008, with a 17–3 record and a 2.54 ERA in 20 games, he again made the All-Star Game. A rarity, Rodríguez received a decision in all 20 games he pitched in. He signed with Uni-President 7-Eleven Lions in Taiwan in 2009.

Rodríguez and his wife Ana reside in Santo Domingo, Dominican Republic, with their 3 children, two sons and one daughter.
