= Matt Whisenant =

American baseball player (born 1971)

- Pitcher
- Born: June 8, 1971 (age 54); Los Angeles, California, U.S.
- Batted: Right Threw: Left

MLB debut
- July 4, 1997, for the Florida Marlins

Last MLB appearance
- May 29, 2000, for the San Diego Padres

MLB statistics
- Win–loss record: 9–8
- Earned run average: 4.96
- Strikeouts: 114
- Stats at Baseball Reference

Teams
- Florida Marlins (1997); Kansas City Royals (1997–1999); San Diego Padres (1999–2000)

Matthew Michael Whisenant (born June 8, 1971) is an American former professional baseball pitcher. He played in Major League Baseball (MLB) for the Florida Marlins, Kansas City Royals, and San Diego Padres.

== Early life ==
Matt Whisenant was born in 1971 in Los Angeles, California and grew up in La Cañada Flintridge, California attending and graduating La Cañada High School in 1989. Whisenant went on to attend Glendale Community College before going pro.

== Playing career ==
Whisenant was drafted by the Philadelphia Phillies in the 18th round, with the 454th overall selection, of the 1989 Major League Baseball draft. He spent the 1992 season with the Phillies' Single-A affiliate, the Spartanburg Phillies. Whisenant was traded to the Florida Marlins alongside Joel Adamson in exchange for Danny Jackson on November 17, 1992. He spent the next five seasons in the Marlins' minor league system before making his major league debut against the New York Mets. On July 29, 1997, Whisenant was traded to the Kansas City Royals in exchange for Matt Treanor. He was released by the Royals on August 14, 1999 and signed as a free agent by the San Diego Padres on August 20. On October 3, 2000, Whisenant became a free agent; he subsequently signed a minor league contract with the Los Angeles Dodgers on December 14 of the same year. He spent the 2001 season season with the Dodgers' Triple-A affiliate, the Las Vegas 51s.

== Coaching career ==
Whisenant returned to La Cañada Flintridge, California to coach high school baseball for La Cañada High School after coaching 9 seasons for Village Christian School.
