= Pete Smith (baseball, born 1966) =

American baseball player

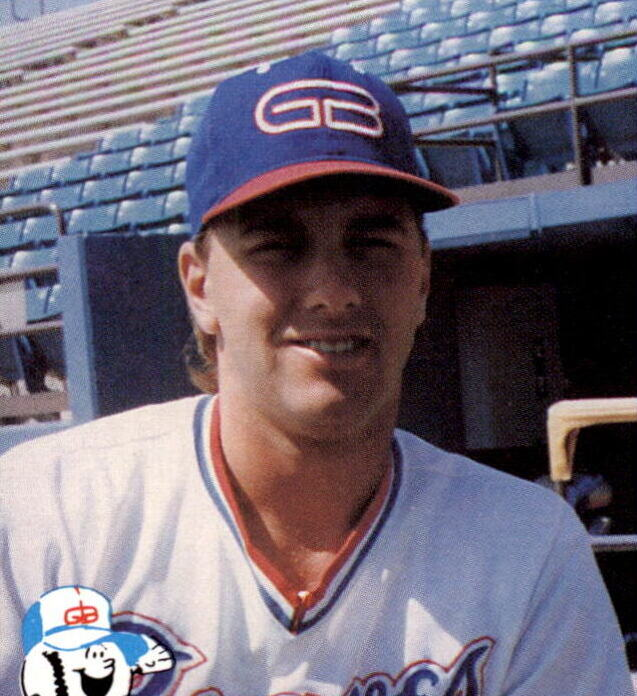
- Smith with the Greenville Braves c. 1987
- Pitcher
- Born: February 27, 1966 (age 60); Abington, Massachusetts, U.S.
- Batted: Right Threw: Right

MLB debut
- September 8, 1987, for the Atlanta Braves

Last MLB appearance
- September 24, 1998, for the Baltimore Orioles

MLB statistics
- Win–loss record: 47–71
- Earned run average: 4.55
- Strikeouts: 640
- Stats at Baseball Reference

Teams
- Atlanta Braves (1987–1993); New York Mets (1994); Cincinnati Reds (1995); San Diego Padres (1997–1998); Baltimore Orioles (1998)

Peter John Smith (born February 27, 1966) is an American former Major League Baseball starting pitcher, born in Abington, Massachusetts. He was drafted by the Philadelphia Phillies in the first round (21st overall pick) in the 1984 Major League Baseball draft. Smith was signed on June 14, 1984, to play in the Philadelphia Phillies organization. He batted and threw right-handed during his baseball career.

== Early life ==
Smith graduated from Burlington High School in 1984 where he pitched two no-hitters in his senior year.

== Career ==
The Philadelphia Phillies traded Smith to the Atlanta Braves, along with Ozzie Virgil, Jr., for Steve Bedrosian and Milt Thompson. Smith made his major league debut on September 8, 1987 with the Atlanta Braves at age 21. In 1988, Smith pitched 3 shutouts, the season after his rookie year. The Atlanta Braves hoped Smith would develop into an ace pitcher as John Smoltz and Tom Glavine were developing to be. But in 1989, Smith's ERA was at 4.75 at the end of the season, higher than his ERA in 1988 when it was at 3.69. On a recent radio show, former Brave Mark Lemke said he thought Smith's down year could be attributed to injuries the pitcher hid from the team and media. He played the 1987 through 1993 seasons with the Atlanta Braves before being traded to the New York Mets for Dave Gallagher. With the New York Mets, Smith only played the 1994 season before being granted free agency on October 25 of that year. On December 1, 1994, Smith was signed as a free agent with the Cincinnati Reds. He played with the Cincinnati Reds for only half of the 1995 season before being released on June 27, signing with the Florida Marlins on July 1. After spending the rest of 1995 in the minors, Smith became a free agent again, signing with the San Diego Padres on December 23.

Smith played 1996 with San Diego's Class AAA farm club, the Las Vegas Stars, but returned to the majors in 1997, playing the next season and a half with the Padres. On May 31, 1997, Smith picked up his one and only MLB save during a Padres 12-5 victory over the Astros. On June 9, 1998, Smith was traded to the Baltimore Orioles organization for minor leaguer Eric Estes. He played his final game on September 24, 1998. He earned a career ERA of 4.55, striking out 640 batters. Smith pitched 4 shutouts throughout his major league career.
