= 1998 New York Yankees season =

Season for the Major League Baseball team the New York Yankees

1998 New York Yankees
- World Series champions American League champions American League East champions
- League: American League
- Division: East
- Ballpark: Yankee Stadium
- City: New York City
- Record: 114–48 (.704)
- Divisional place: 1st
- Owners: George Steinbrenner
- General managers: Brian Cashman
- Managers: Joe Torre
- Television: WPIX (Bobby Murcer, Tommy John); MSG (Ken Singleton, Jim Kaat, Al Trautwig, Suzyn Waldman)
- Radio: WABC (AM) (John Sterling, Michael Kay)

The 1998 New York Yankees season was the 96th season played by the New York Yankees of Major League Baseball. The Yankees played at Yankee Stadium, celebrating the stadium's 75th anniversary. Joe Torre managed the team.

Widely regarded as one of the greatest teams in baseball history, the 1998 Yankees finished with regular-season record of 114–48, a franchise record and the American League record for wins in a season (which would be broken by the 2001 Seattle Mariners, who went 116-46). It also saw Yankee David Wells pitch the 15th perfect game in baseball history.

Two games against the Anaheim Angels were postponed on April 13 and 14 after the collapse of a 500 pound support beam. The third game of the series was rescheduled for Shea Stadium on April 15. Later that season a 3-game series against the Angels was expanded to a 5-game series, including a double-header.

In the postseason, they swept the Texas Rangers in the American League Division Series, won the American League pennant by beating the Cleveland Indians four games to two in the American League Championship Series, and swept the San Diego Padres to capture their 24th World Series. Including the playoffs, the 1998 Yankees won a total of 125 games against 50 losses, a Major League Baseball record.

== Offseason transactions ==
- November 11, 1997: Charlie Hayes was traded by the New York Yankees with cash to the San Francisco Giants for Chris Singleton and Alberto Castillo (minors).
- November 12, 1997: Luis Sojo was signed as a free agent with the New York Yankees.
- November 18, 1997: Scott Brosius was sent by the Oakland Athletics to the New York Yankees to complete an earlier deal made on November 7, 1997. The Oakland Athletics sent a player to be named later to the New York Yankees for Kenny Rogers and cash.
- November 25, 1997: Dale Sveum was signed as a free agent with the New York Yankees.
- December 10, 1997: Chili Davis signed as a free agent with the New York Yankees.
- January 8, 1998: Darryl Strawberry re-signed as a free agent with the New York Yankees.
- January 15, 1998: Tim Raines re-signed as a free agent with the New York Yankees.
- January 26, 1998: Doug Linton was signed as a free agent with the New York Yankees.
- February 6, 1998: Chuck Knoblauch was traded by the Minnesota Twins to the New York Yankees for Brian Buchanan, Cristian Guzmán, Eric Milton, Danny Mota, and cash.
- March 14, 1998: Doug Linton was released by the New York Yankees.
- June 2, 1998: Mark Prior was drafted by the New York Yankees in the 1st round (43rd pick) of the 1998 amateur draft, but did not sign.
- June 2, 1998: Drew Henson was drafted by the New York Yankees in the 3rd round of the 1998 amateur draft. Player signed July 24, 1998.
- June 28, 1998: Ken Huckaby was signed as a free agent with the New York Yankees.
- August 3, 1998: Dale Sveum was released by the New York Yankees.
- September 29, 1998: Alfonso Soriano was purchased by the New York Yankees from the Hiroshima Toyo Carp (Japan Central).

== Season standings ==
AL East
Team	W	L	Pct.	GB	Home	Road
New York Yankees	114	48	.704	—	62‍–‍19	52‍–‍29
Boston Red Sox	92	70	.568	22	51‍–‍30	41‍–‍40
Toronto Blue Jays	88	74	.543	26	51‍–‍30	37‍–‍44
Baltimore Orioles	79	83	.488	35	42‍–‍39	37‍–‍44
Tampa Bay Devil Rays	63	99	.389	51	33‍–‍48	30‍–‍51

=== Record vs. opponents ===
1998 American League record Source: MLB Standings Grid – 1998
Team	ANA	BAL	BOS	CWS	CLE	DET	KC	MIN	NYY	OAK	SEA	TB	TEX	TOR	NL
Anaheim	—	5–6	6–5	5–6	4–7	8–3	6–5	6–5	6–5	5–7	9–3	6–5	5–7	4–7	10–6
Baltimore	6–5	—	6–6	2–9	5–6	10–1	5–6	7–3	3–9	8–3	6–5	5–7	6–5	5–7	5–11
Boston	5–6	6–6	—	5–6	8–3	5–5	8–3	5–6	5–7	9–2	7–4	9–3	6–5	5–7	9–7
Chicago	6–5	9–2	6–5	—	6–6	6–6	8–4	6–6	4–7	4–7	4–7	5–6	5–6	4–6–1	7–9
Cleveland	7–4	6–5	3–8	6–6	—	9–3	8–4	6–6	4–7	3–8	9–2	7–3	4–7	7–4	10–6
Detroit	3–8	1–10	5–5	6–6	3–9	—	6–6	8–4	3–8	7–4	3–8	5–6	3–8	5–6	7–9
Kansas City	5–6	6–5	3–8	4–8	4–8	6–6	—	7–5	0–10	7–4	4–6	8–3	3–8	6–5	9–7
Minnesota	5–6	3–7	6–5	6–6	6–6	4–8	5–7	—	4–7	4–7	2–9	7–4	7–4	4–7	7–9
New York	5–6	9–3	7–5	7–4	7–4	8–3	10–0	7–4	—	8–3	8–3	11–1	8–3	6–6	13–3
Oakland	7–5	3–8	2–9	7–4	8–3	4–7	4–7	7–4	3–8	—	5–7	5–6	6–6	5–6	8–8
Seattle	3–9	5–6	4–7	7–4	2–9	8–3	6–4	9–2	3–8	7–5	—	6–5	5–7	4–7	7–9
Tampa Bay	5–6	7–5	3–9	6–5	3–7	6–5	3–8	4–7	1–11	6–5	5–6	—	4–7	5–7	5–11
Texas	7–5	5–6	5–6	6–5	7–4	8–3	8–3	4–7	3–8	6–6	7–5	7–4	—	7–4	8–8
Toronto	7–4	7–5	7–5	6–4–1	4–7	6–5	5–6	7–4	6–6	6–5	7–4	7–5	4–7	—	9–7

=== Roster ===
1998 New York Yankees
Roster
Pitchers: 13 Willie Banks; 57 Joe Borowski; 59 Ryan Bradley; 61 Jim Bruske; 52 Mike Buddie; 36 David Cone; 54 Todd Erdos; 26 Orlando Hernández; 40 Darren Holmes; 35 Hideki Irabu; 58 Mike Jerzembeck; 27 Graeme Lloyd; 55 Ramiro Mendoza; 43 Jeff Nelson; 46 Andy Pettitte; 42 Mariano Rivera; 29 Mike Stanton; 62 Jay Tessmer; 33 David Wells	Catchers: 13 Mike Figga; 25 Joe Girardi; 20 Jorge Posada; Infielders: 18 Scott Brosius; 22 Homer Bush; 2 Derek Jeter; 11 Chuck Knoblauch; 60 Mike Lowell; 24 Tino Martinez; 19 Luis Sojo; 17 Dale Sveum	Outfielders: 28 Chad Curtis; 38 Ricky Ledée; 21 Paul O'Neill; 31 Tim Raines; 47 Shane Spencer; 39 Darryl Strawberry; 51 Bernie Williams; Designated Hitter: 45 Chili Davis	Manager: 6 Joe Torre; Coaches: 53 José Cardenal (First Base); 48 Chris Chambliss (Hitting); 40 Tony Cloninger (Bullpen); 30 Willie Randolph (Third Base); 34 Mel Stottlemyre (Pitching); 50 Don Zimmer (Bench)

== Game log ==
=== Regular season ===
Legend
	Yankees win
	Yankees loss
	Yankees tie
	Postponement
	Clinched division
**Bold**	Yankees team member

1998 regular season game log: 114–48 (Home: 62–19 Away: 52–29)
April: 17–6 (Home: 9–1 Away: 8–5)

#	Date	Time (ET)	Opponent	Score	Win	Loss	Save	Time of Game	Attendance	Record	Box/ Streak
1	April 1	@ Angels	1–4	Finley (1–0)	**Pettitte** (0–1)	Percival (1)	Edison International Field of Anaheim		43,311	0–1	
2	April 2	@ Angels	2–10	Hill (1–0)	**Wells** (0–1)	—	Edison International Field of Anaheim		29,899	0–2	
—	April 3	@ Athletics	Postponed (rain); rescheduled for August 4								
3	April 4	@ Athletics	3–7	Haynes (1–0)	**Cone** (0–1)	—	Oakland-Alameda County Coliseum		17,118	0–3	
4	April 5	@ Athletics	9–7 (10)	**Nelson** (1–0)	Mohler (0–1)	—	Oakland-Alameda County Coliseum		18,109	1–3	
5	April 6	@ Mariners	0–8	Moyer (1–1)	**Pettitte** (0–2)	—	Kingdome		27,445	1–4	
6	April 7	@ Mariners	13–7	**Wells** (1–1)	Bullinger (0–1)	—	Kingdome		28,424	2–4	
7	April 8	@ Mariners	4–3	**Lloyd** (1–0)	Ayala (0–1)	**Stanton** (1)	Kingdome		33,922	3–4	
8	April 10	Athletics	17–13	**Buddie** (1–0)	Dougherty (0–1)	—	**Yankee Stadium**		56,717	4–4	
9	April 11	Athletics	3–1	**Pettitte** (1–2)	Candiotti (0–3)	**Stanton** (2)	**Yankee Stadium**		33,238	5–4	
10	April 12	Athletics	7–5	**Buddie** (2–0)	Mathews (0–1)	**Stanton** (3)	**Yankee Stadium**		27,057	6–4	
—	April 13	Angels	Postponed (stadium structural problems); rescheduled for August 24								
—	April 14	Angels	Postponed (stadium structural problems); rescheduled for August 26								
11	April 15	Angels	6–3	**Wells** (2–1)	Hill (2–1)	**Nelson** (1)	Shea Stadium		40,743	7–4	
12	April 17	@ Tigers	11–2	**Pettitte** (2–2)	Thompson (1–3)	—	Tiger Stadium		12,348	8–4	
13	April 18	@ Tigers	8–3	**Cone** (1–1)	Keagle (0–3)	—	Tiger Stadium		13,803	9–4	
14	April 19	@ Tigers	1–2	Moehler (1–2)	**Holmes** (0–1)	Jones (2)	Tiger Stadium		12,568	9–5	
15	April 20	@ Blue Jays	3–2 (11)	**Banks** (1–0)	Risley (0–2)	**Stanton** (4)	SkyDome		26,385	10–5	
16	April 21	@ Blue Jays	5–3 (10)	**Stanton** (1–0)	Plesac (0–2)	—	SkyDome		27,192	11–5	
17	April 22	@ Blue Jays	9–1	**Pettitte** (3–2)	Clemens (2–2)	—	SkyDome		29,164	12–5	
18	April 24	Tigers	8–4	**Cone** (2–1)	Keagle (0–4)	—	**Yankee Stadium**		26,173	13–5	
19	April 25	Tigers	5–4	**Wells** (3–1)	Runyan (0–1)	**Rivera** (1)	**Yankee Stadium**		33,196	14–5	
—	April 26	Tigers	Postponed (rain); rescheduled for July 20								
20	April 27	Blue Jays	1–0	**Pettitte** (4–2)	Clemens (2–3)	**Rivera** (2)	**Yankee Stadium**		17,863	15–5	
21	April 28	Blue Jays	2–5	Williams (2–1)	**Mendoza** (0–1)	Myers (5)	**Yankee Stadium**		18,727	15–6	
22	April 29	Mariners	8–5	**Cone** (3–1)	Fassero (2–1)	**Rivera** (3)	**Yankee Stadium**		27,949	16–6	
23	April 30	Mariners	9–8 (10)	**Rivera** (1–0)	Ayala (0–2)	—	**Yankee Stadium**		28,517	17–6	

May: 20–7 (Home: 9–4 Away: 11–3)

#	Date	Time (ET)	Opponent	Score	Win	Loss	Save	Time of Game	Attendance	Record	Box/ Streak	
24	May 1	@ Royals	2–1	**Irabu** (1–0)	Rapp (1–3)	**Rivera** (4)	Kauffman Stadium		19,002	18–6		
25	May 2	@ Royals	12–6	**Pettitte** (5–2)	Haney (2–2)	—	Kauffman Stadium		22,743	19–6		
26	May 3	@ Royals	10–1	**Mendoza** (1–1)	Belcher (1–4)	—	Kauffman Stadium		22,609	20–6		
27	May 5	@ Rangers	7–2	**Cone** (4–1)	Burkett (2–4)	—	The Ballpark in Arlington		31,693	21–6		
28	May 6	@ Rangers	15–13	**Stanton** (2–0)	Patterson (0–1)	**Rivera** (5)	The Ballpark in Arlington		33,274	22–6		
29	May 8	@ Twins	5–1	**Irabu** (2–0)	Radke (3–3)	**Nelson** (2)	Hubert H. Humphrey Metrodome		22,612	23–6		
30	May 9	@ Twins	1–8	Morgan (1–1)	**Pettitte** (5–3)	—	Hubert H. Humphrey Metrodome		20,471	23–7		
31	May 10	@ Twins	7–0	**Mendoza** (2–1)	Milton (2–4)	—	Hubert H. Humphrey Metrodome		12,444	24–7		
—	May 11	Royals	Postponed (rain); rescheduled for August 7									
32	May 12	Royals	3–2	**Wells** (4–1)	Rusch (3–5)	**Rivera** (6)	**Yankee Stadium**		16,606	25–7		
33	May 13	Rangers	8–6	**Cone** (5–1)	Helling (6–1)	**Rivera** (7)	**Yankee Stadium**		23,142	26–7		
34	May 14	Rangers	5–7 (13)	Patterson (1–1)	**Banks** (1–1)	Wetteland (11)	**Yankee Stadium**		20,694	26–8		
35	May 15	Twins	6–7	Milton (3–4)	**Pettitte** (5–4)	Aguilera (8)	**Yankee Stadium**		31,272	26–9		
36	May 16	Twins	5–2	**Mendoza** (3–1)	Tewksbury (3–6)	**Rivera** (8)	**Yankee Stadium**		35,137	27–9		
37	May 17	Twins	4–0	**Wells** (5–1)	Hawkins (2–4)	—	**Yankee Stadium**		49,820	28–9		
38	May 19	Orioles	9–5	**Stanton** (3–0)	Charlton (0–1)	—	**Yankee Stadium**		31,311	29–9		
39	May 20	Orioles	9–6	**Irabu** (3–0)	Key (4–3)	—	**Yankee Stadium**		32,449	30–9		
40	May 21	Orioles	3–1	**Pettitte** (6–4)	Erickson (4–5)	**Rivera** (9)	**Yankee Stadium**		34,588	31–9		
41	May 22		@ Red Sox	L 4–5	Wakefield (6–1)	**Nelson** (1–1)	Gordon (18)		33,605	31–10	L1	
42	May 23		@ Red Sox	**W** 12–3	**Wells** (6–1)	Lowe (0–3)	—		33,120	32–10	W1	
43	May 24		@ Red Sox	**W** 14–4	**Cone** (6–1)	Saberhagen (5–3)	—		33,042	33–10	W2	
44	May 25	@ White Sox	12–0	**Irabu** (4–0)	Navarro (4–5)	—	Comiskey Park		19,812	34–10		
45	May 26	@ White Sox	7–5	**Nelson** (2–1)	Foulke (1–1)	**Rivera** (10)	Comiskey Park		14,596	35–10		
46	May 27	@ White Sox	9–12	Simas (1–1)	**Nelson** (2–2)	Karchner (5)	Comiskey Park		15,232	35–11		
47	May 28		Red Sox	**W** 8–3	**Wells** (7–1)	Wakefield (6–2)	**Stanton** (5)		42,182	36–11	W1	
48	May 29		Red Sox	**W** 6–2	**Cone** (7–1)	Lowe (0–4)	—		47,160		37–11	W2
49	May 30		Red Sox	L 2–3	Saberhagen (6–3)	**Irabu** (4–1)	Gordon (19)		55,191	37–12	L1	
50	May 31		Red Sox	L 7–13	Martinez (6–1)	**Pettitte** (6–5)	—		55,711	37–13	L2	

June: 19–7 (Home: 10–1 Away: 9–6)

#	Date	Time (ET)	Opponent	Score	Win	Loss	Save	Time of Game	Attendance	Record	Box/ Streak
51	June 1	White Sox	5–4 (10)	**Nelson** (3–2)	Karchner (1–2)	—	**Yankee Stadium**		19,131	38–13	
52	June 2	White Sox	6–3	**Wells** (8–1)	Sirotka (6–5)	**Rivera** (11)	**Yankee Stadium**		22,599	39–13	
53	June 3	Devil Rays	7–1	**Hernandez** (1–0)	Saunders (1–6)	—	**Yankee Stadium**		27,291	40–13	
54	June 4	Devil Rays	6–1	**Irabu** (5–1)	Springer (2–9)	—	**Yankee Stadium**		22,759	41–13	
55	June 5	Marlins	5–1	**Pettitte** (7–5)	Fontenot (0–3)	—	**Yankee Stadium**		28,085	42–13	
56	June 6	Marlins	4–2	**Mendoza** (4–1)	Sanchez (3–2)	**Rivera** (12)	**Yankee Stadium**		36,419	43–13	
57	June 7	Marlins	4–1	**Cone** (8–1)	Dempster (0–2)	—	**Yankee Stadium**		47,731	44–13	
58	June 9	@ Expos	11–1	**Hernandez** (2–0)	Perez (6–4)	—	Olympic Stadium		16,238	45–13	
59	June 10	@ Expos	6–2	**Irabu** (6–1)	Hermanson (4–5)	—	Olympic Stadium		14,335	46–13	
60	June 11	@ Expos	5–7	Valdes (1–3)	**Nelson** (3–3)	Urbina (15)	Olympic Stadium		16,036	46–14	
—	June 12	7:35 p.m. EDT	Indians	**Postponed (Rain)** (Makeup date: September 21)							
—	June 13	1:15 p.m. EDT	Indians	**Postponed (Rain)** (Makeup date: September 22)							
61	June 14	1:36 p.m. EDT	Indians	**W** 4–2	**Cone** (9–1)	Wright (5–4)	**Rivera** (13)	2:48	42,949	47–14	W1
62	June 15	@ Orioles	4–7	Erickson (7–6)	**Wells** (8–2)	Orosco (5)	Oriole Park at Camden Yards		48,022	47–15	
63	June 16	@ Orioles	0–2	Ponson (1–4)	**Irabu** (6–2)	Rhodes (3)	Oriole Park at Camden Yards		48,027	47–16	
64	June 17	@ Orioles	5–3	**Pettitte** (8–5)	Mussina (5–4)	**Rivera** (14)	Oriole Park at Camden Yards		48,269	48–16	
65	June 18	7:08 p.m. EDT	@ Indians	**W** 5–2	**Nelson** (4–3)	Assenmacher (2–4)	**Rivera** (15)	3:05	43,096	49–16	W2
66	June 19	7:05 p.m. EDT	@ Indians	L 4–7	Wright (6–4)	**Cone** (9–2)	Jackson (14)	3:04	43,180	49–17	L1
67	June 20	1:17 p.m. EDT	@ Indians	**W** 5–3	**Wells** (9–2)	Burba (8–5)	**Rivera** (16)	2:58	43,259	50–17	W1
68	June 21	8:08 p.m. EDT	@ Indians	L 0–11	Colón (7–4)	**Irabu** (6–3)	—	2:50	43,104	50–18	L1
69	June 22	7:35 p.m. EDT	Braves	**W** 6–4	**Nelson** (5–3)	Martinez (2–4)	**Rivera** (17)	3:10	53,316	51–18	W1
70	June 23	7:35 p.m. EDT	Braves	L 2–7	Glavine (10–3)	**Hernández** (2–1)	—	2:44	54,775	51–19	L1
71	June 24	7:40 p.m. EDT	@ Braves	**W** 10–6	**Cone** (10–2)	Millwood (9–4)	**Rivera** (18)	3:19	48,980	52–19	W1
72	June 25	7:41 p.m. EDT	@ Braves	**W** 6–0	**Wells** (10–2)	Neagle (8–6)	—	2:58	49,052	53–19	W2
73	June 26	@ Mets	8–4	**Mendoza** (5–1)	Leiter (9–4)	**Rivera** (19)	Shea Stadium		53,404	54–19	
74	June 27	@ Mets	7–2	**Pettitte** (9–5)	Jones (6–5)	—	Shea Stadium		53,587	55–19	
75	June 28	@ Mets	1–2	Cook (4–2)	**Mendoza** (5–2)	—	Shea Stadium		53,749	55–20	
76	June 30	Phillies	9–2	**Cone** (11–2)	Loewer (2–1)	—	**Yankee Stadium**		29,087	56–20	

July: 20–7 (Home: 10–2 Away: 10–5)

#	Date	Time (ET)	Opponent	Score	Win	Loss	Save	Time of Game	Attendance	Record	Box/ Streak
77	July 1	Phillies	5–2	**Wells** (11–2)	Beech (3–6)	**Rivera** (20)	**Yankee Stadium**		28,919	57–20	
78	July 2	Phillies	9–8 (11)	**Buddie** (3–0)	Spradlin (3–4)	—	**Yankee Stadium**		31,259	58–20	
79	July 3	Orioles	3–2	**Pettitte** (10–5)	Orosco (1–1)	—	**Yankee Stadium**		43,328	59–20	
80	July 4	Orioles	4–3	**Hernandez** (3–1)	Drabek (5–9)	**Rivera** (21)	**Yankee Stadium**		37,390	60–20	
81	July 5	Orioles	1–0	**Cone** (12–2)	Erickson (8–7)	**Rivera** (22)	**Yankee Stadium**		52,506	61–20	
**69th All-Star Game in Denver, Colorado**
82	July 9	@ Devil Rays	2–0	**Pettitte** (11–5)	Rekar (0–1)	**Rivera** (23)	Tropicana Field		38,386	62–20	
83	July 10	@ Devil Rays	8–4	**Irabu** (7–3)	Alvarez (4–6)	**Mendoza** (1)	Tropicana Field		40,363	63–20	
84	July 11	@ Devil Rays	2–0	**Cone** (13–2)	Arrojo (10–6)	**Rivera** (24)	Tropicana Field		44,589	64–20	
85	July 12	@ Devil Rays	9–2	**Stanton** (4–0)	Hernandez (0–4)	—	Tropicana Field		43,373	65–20	
86	July 13	7:05 p.m. EDT	@ Indians	L 1–4	Wright (9–5)	**Hernández** (3–2)	Jackson (20)	2:54	43,177	65–21	L1
87	July 14	7:07 p.m. EDT	@ Indians	**W** 7–1	**Pettitte** (12–5)	Burba (10–7)	—	2:49	43,164	66–21	W1
88	July 15	@ Tigers	11–0	**Irabu** (8–3)	Greisinger (1–4)	—	Tiger Stadium		19,868	67–21	
89	July 16	@ Tigers	1–3	Moehler (10–6)	**Cone** (13–3)	Jones (16)	Tiger Stadium		21,336	67–22	
90	July 17	@ Blue Jays	6–9	Clemens (11–6)	**Holmes** (0–2)	Myers (25)	SkyDome		39,172	67–23	
91	July 18	@ Blue Jays	10–3	**Hernandez** (4–2)	Guzman (4–12)	—	SkyDome		48,123	68–23	
92	July 19	@ Blue Jays	3–9	Williams (9–4)	**Pettitte** (12–6)	—	SkyDome		42,176	68–24	
93	July 20 (1)	Tigers	3–4 (17)	Sager (3–1)	**Holmes** (0–3)	—	**Yankee Stadium**		N/A	68–25	
94	July 20 (2)	Tigers	4–3	**Irabu** (9–3)	Florie (5–4)	**Rivera** (25)	**Yankee Stadium**		36,285	69–25	
95	July 21	Tigers	5–1	**Cone** (14–3)	Moehler (10–7)	—	**Yankee Stadium**		35,980	70–25	
96	July 22	Tigers	13–2	**Hernandez** (5–2)	Powell (1–2)	**Holmes** (1)	**Yankee Stadium**		49,029	71–25	
97	July 24	White Sox	5–4	**Pettitte** (13–6)	Ward (0–1)	**Rivera** (26)	**Yankee Stadium**		44,264	72–25	
98	July 25	White Sox	2–6	Sirotka (10–9)	**Irabu** (9–4)	Simas (9)	**Yankee Stadium**		55,638	72–26	
99	July 26	White Sox	6–3	**Wells** (12–2)	Navarro (8–12)	**Rivera** (27)	**Yankee Stadium**		51,865	73–26	
100	July 28	@ Angels	9–3	**Cone** (15–3)	Dickson (9–8)	—	Edison International Field of Anaheim		36,241	74–26	
101	July 29	@ Angels	5–10	Sparks (4–2)	**Hernandez** (5–3)	—	Edison International Field of Anaheim		38,829	74–27	
102	July 30	@ Angels	3–0 (10)	**Mendoza** (6–2)	DeLucia (1–4)	**Rivera** (28)	Edison International Field of Anaheim		42,915	75–27	
103	July 31	@ Mariners	5–3	**Irabu** (10–4)	Fassero (10–7)	**Rivera** (29)	Kingdome		43,837	76–27	

August: 22–10 (Home: 14–5 Away: 8–5)

#	Date	Time (ET)	Opponent	Score	Win	Loss	Save	Time of Game	Attendance	Record	Box/ Streak
104	August 1	@ Mariners	5–2	**D. Wells** (13–2)	Moyer (8–8)	—	Kingdome		53,840	77–27	
105	August 2	@ Mariners	3–6	B. Wells (1–2)	**Cone** (15–4)	Timlin (6)	Kingdome		47,872	77–28	
106	August 3	@ Athletics	14–1	**O. Hernandez** (6–3)	Oquist (6–9)	—	Oakland-Alameda County Coliseum		18,209	78–28	
107	August 4 (1)	@ Athletics	10–4	**Mendoza** (7–2)	Witasick (0–1)	**Stanton** (6)	Oakland-Alameda County Coliseum		N/A	79–28	
108	August 4 (2)	@ Athletics	10–5	**Lloyd** (2–0)	Taylor (3–9)	—	Oakland-Alameda County Coliseum		23,357	80–28	
109	August 5	@ Athletics	1–3	Candiotti (7–13)	**Irabu** (10–5)	—	Oakland-Alameda County Coliseum		22,458	80–29	
110	August 7 (1)	Royals	8–2	**Cone** (16–4)	Rapp (9–11)	—	**Yankee Stadium**		14,425	81–29	
111	August 7 (2)	Royals	14–2	**D. Wells** (14–2)	Haney (4–5)	—	**Yankee Stadium**		37,988	82–29	
112	August 8	Royals	14–1	**O. Hernandez** (7–3)	Rusch (6–15)	—	**Yankee Stadium**		45,975	83–29	
113	August 9	Royals	5–4	**Mendoza** (8–2)	Service (4–3)	**Rivera** (30)	**Yankee Stadium**		55,911	84–29	
114	August 10	Twins	7–3	**Irabu** (11–5)	Rodriguez (1–2)	—	**Yankee Stadium**		29,600	85–29	
115	August 11	Twins	7–0	**D. Wells** (15–2)	Milton (6–9)	—	**Yankee Stadium**		37,413	86–29	
116	August 12	Twins	11–2	**Cone** (17–4)	Hawkins (7–11)	—	**Yankee Stadium**		47,841	87–29	
117	August 13	Rangers	2–0	**O. Hernandez** (8–3)	Helling (15–7)	**Rivera** (31)	**Yankee Stadium**		53,835	88–29	
118	August 14	Rangers	6–4	**Pettitte** (14–6)	Sele (13–10)	**Rivera** (32)	**Yankee Stadium**		46,547	89–29	
119	August 15	Rangers	5–16	Stottlemyre (11–10)	**Irabu** (11–6)	—	**Yankee Stadium**		53,117	89–30	
120	August 16	Rangers	6–5	**Rivera** (2–0)	X. Hernandez (5–2)	—	**Yankee Stadium**		50,304	90–30	
121	August 17	@ Royals	7–1	**Cone** (18–4)	Rosado (6–9)	—	Kauffman Stadium		27,895	91–30	
122	August 18	@ Royals	3–2 (13)	**Borowski** (1–0)	Whisenant (1–1)	—	Kauffman Stadium		26,259	92–30	
123	August 19	@ Twins	3–5	Serafini (6–4)	**Pettitte** (14–7)	Aguilera (31)	Hubert H. Humphrey Metrodome		17,923	92–31	
124	August 20	@ Twins	4–9	Rodriguez (3–2)	**Buddie** (3–1)	—	Hubert H. Humphrey Metrodome		18,548	92–32	
125	August 21	@ Rangers	5–0	**D. Wells** (16–2)	Loaiza (7–8)	—	The Ballpark in Arlington		45,841	93–32	
126	August 22	@ Rangers	12–9	**Bradley** (1–0)	X. Hernandez (5–3)	**Rivera** (33)	The Ballpark in Arlington		46,483	94–32	
127	August 23	@ Rangers	10–12	Helling (16–7)	**O. Hernandez** (8–4)	Wetteland (34)	The Ballpark in Arlington		37,284	94–33	
128	August 24	Angels	3–7	McDowell (3–2)	**Pettitte** (14–8)	—	**Yankee Stadium**		19,297	94–34	
129	August 25	Angels	6–7	Watson (6–7)	**Stanton** (4–1)	Percival (36)	**Yankee Stadium**		30,422	94–35	
130	August 26 (1)	Angels	4–6	Juden (8–13)	**Bradley** (1–1)	Percival (37)	**Yankee Stadium**		20,077	94–36	
131	August 26 (2)	Angels	7–6	**Rivera** (3–0)	Fetters (2–7)	—	**Yankee Stadium**		28,837	95–36	
132	August 27	Angels	6–5 (11)	**Tessmer** (1–0)	Fetters (2–8)	—	**Yankee Stadium**		29,213	96–36	
133	August 28	Mariners	10–3	**O. Hernandez** (9–4)	Spoljaric (4–3)	—	**Yankee Stadium**		49,789	97–36	
134	August 29	Mariners	11–6	**Pettitte** (15–8)	Cloude (8–10)	—	**Yankee Stadium**		55,146	98–36	
135	August 30	Mariners	3–13	Swift (11–8)	**Irabu** (11–7)	—	**Yankee Stadium**		55,341	98–37	

September: 16–11 (Home: 10–6 Away: 6–5)

#	Date	Time (ET)	Opponent	Score	Win	Loss	Save	Time of Game	Attendance	Record	Box/ Streak
136	September 1	Athletics	7–0	**Wells** (17–2)	Candiotti (10–15)	—	**Yankee Stadium**		29,632	99–37	
137	September 2	Athletics	0–2	Heredia (3–0)	**Cone** (18–5)	Taylor (29)	**Yankee Stadium**		30,332	99–38	
138	September 4	@ White Sox	11–6	**Lloyd** (3–0)	Bradford (2–1)	—	Comiskey Park		19,876	100–38	
139	September 5	@ White Sox	5–9	Abbott (1–0)	**Pettitte** (15–9)	—	Comiskey Park		33,092	100–39	
140	September 6	@ White Sox	5–6	Baldwin (10–5)	**Irabu** (11–8)	Howry (5)	Comiskey Park		24,498	100–40	
141	September 7		@ Red Sox	L 3–4	Swindell (5–5)	**Wells** (17–3)	Gordon (39)		32,106	100–41	L3
142	September 8		@ Red Sox	**W** 3–2	**Cone** (19–5)	Martinez (18–5)	**Rivera** (34)		33,409	101–41	W1
143	September 9		@ Red Sox	**W** 7–5	**Mendoza** (9–2)	Wakefield (15–8)	**Rivera** (35)		32,942	102–41	W2
144	September 10	Blue Jays	8–5	**Pettitte** (16–9)	Hentgen (12–11)	**Holmes** (2)	**Yankee Stadium**		25,881	103–41	
145	September 11	Blue Jays	4–5	Almanzar (2–2)	**Irabu** (11–9)	Person (2)	**Yankee Stadium**		35,856	103–42	
146	September 12	Blue Jays	3–5	Carpenter (11–7)	**Wells** (17–4)	Person (3)	**Yankee Stadium**		48,752	103–43	
147	September 13	Blue Jays	3–5	Escobar (6–2)	**Cone** (19–6)	Person (4)	**Yankee Stadium**		47,471	103–44	
148	September 14		Red Sox	**W** 3–0	**Hernandez** (10–4)	Martinez (18–6)	—		42,735	104–44	W1
149	September 15		Red Sox	L 4–9	Wakefield (16–8)	Jerzembeck (0–1)	—		43,218	104–45	L1
150	September 16	@ Devil Rays	0–7	Saunders (6–14)	**Pettitte** (16–10)	—	Tropicana Field		38,862	104–46	
151	September 17	@ Devil Rays	4–0	**Irabu** (12–9)	Santana (5–5)	—	Tropicana Field		38,820	105–46	
152	September 18	@ Orioles	15–5	**Wells** (18–4)	Guzman (10–15)	—	Oriole Park at Camden Yards		48,113	106–46	
153	September 19	@ Orioles	3–5	Ponson (8–8)	**Cone** (19–7)	Mills (2)	Oriole Park at Camden Yards		48,044	106–47	
154	September 20	@ Orioles	5–4	**Hernandez** (11–4)	Johns (3–3)	**Rivera** (36)	Oriole Park at Camden Yards		48,013	107–47	
155	September 21	7:37 p.m. EDT	Indians	L 1–4	Nagy (15–10)	**Pettitte** (16–11)	Shuey (2)	2:48	21,449	107–48	L1
156 (1)	September 22	1:05 p.m. EDT	Indians	**W** 10–4	**Mendoza** (10–2)	Burba (14–10)	—	2:52	14,840	108–48	W1
157 (2)	September 22	7:35 p.m. EDT	Indians	**W** 5–1	**Irabu** (13–9)	Ogea (5–4)	—	2:23	32,315	109–48	W2
158	September 23	7:35 p.m. EDT	Indians	**W** 8–4	**Bradley** (2–1)	Jacome (0–1)	—	2:38	32,367	110–48	W3
159	September 24	Devil Rays	5–2	**Buddie** (4–1)	Alvarez (6–14)	**Nelson** (3)	**Yankee Stadium**		24,555	111–48	
160	September 25	Devil Rays	6–1	**Hernandez** (12–4)	Eiland (0–1)	—	**Yankee Stadium**		32,447	112–48	
161	September 26	Devil Rays	3–1	**Cone** (20–7)	Wade (1–1)	—	**Yankee Stadium**		41,150	113–48	
162	September 27	Devil Rays	8–3	**Bruske** (1–0)	White (2–6)	—	**Yankee Stadium**		49,608	114–48	

=== Detailed records ===
American League
Opponent	W	L	WP	RS	RA
AL East
Baltimore Orioles	9	3	0.750	61	43
Boston Red Sox	7	5	0.583	73	53
**New York Yankees**					
Tampa Bay Devil Rays	11	1	0.917	60	22
Toronto Blue Jays	6	6	0.500	57	52
Div Total	33	15	0.688	251	170
AL Central
Chicago White Sox	7	4	0.636	73	58
Cleveland Indians	7	4	0.636	50	43
Detroit Tigers	8	3	0.727	70	28
Kansas City Royals	10	0	1.000	78	22
Minnesota Twins	7	4	0.636	60	37
Div Total	39	15	0.722	331	188
AL West
Anaheim Angels	5	6	0.455	52	61
Oakland Athletics	8	3	0.727	81	48
Seattle Mariners	8	3	0.727	71	64
Texas Rangers	8	3	0.727	81	74
Div Total	29	15	0.659	285	247
League Total	101	45	0.692	867	605
National League
Atlanta Braves	3	1	0.750	24	17
Florida Marlins	3	0	1.000	13	4
Montreal Expos	2	1	0.667	22	10
New York Mets	2	1	0.667	16	8
Philadelphia Phillies	3	0	1.000	23	12
League Total	13	3	0.813	98	51
Season Total	114	48	0.704	965	656

Month	Games	Won	Lost	Win %	RS	RA
April	23	17	6	0.739	135	107
May	27	20	7	0.741	192	118
June	26	19	7	0.731	135	87
July	27	20	7	0.741	142	89
August	32	22	10	0.688	222	151
September	27	16	11	0.593	139	104
Total	162	114	48	0.704	965	656

	Games	Won	Lost	Win %	RS	RA
Home	81	62	19	0.765	472	314
Away	81	52	29	0.642	493	342
Total	162	114	48	0.704	965	656

=== Postseason Game log ===
Legend
	Yankees win
	Yankees loss
**Bold**	Yankees team member

1998 Postseason game log: 11–2 (Home: 8–1; Away: 5–1)
AL Division Series vs. Texas Rangers 3–0 (Home: 2–0; Away: 1–0)

#	Date	Time (ET)	Opponent	Score	Win	Loss	Save	Time of Game	Attendance	Series	Box/ Streak
1	September 29		Rangers	2–0	**Wells** (1–0)	Stottlemyre (0–1)	**Rivera** (1)		57,362	NYA 1–0	
2	September 30		Rangers	3–1	**Pettitte** (1–0)	Helling (0–1)	**Rivera** (2)		57,360	NYA 2–0	
3	October 2		@ Rangers	4–0	**Cone** (1–0)	Sele (0–1)	—		49,450	NYA 3–0	

AL Championship Series vs. Cleveland Indians 4–2 (Home: 2–1; Away: 2–1)

#	Date	Time (ET)	Opponent	Score	Win	Loss	Save	Time of Game	Attendance	Series	Box/ Streak
1	October 6	8:07 p.m. EDT	Indians	**W** 7–2	**Wells** (1–0)	Wright (0–1)	—	3:31	57,138	NYA 1–0	W1
2	October 7	4:07 p.m. EDT	Indians	L 1–4 (12)	Burba (2–0)	**Nelson** (0–1)	Jackson (4)	4:28	57,128	Tied 1–1	L1
3	October 9	8:07 p.m. EDT	@ Indians	L 1–6	Colón (1–0)	**Pettitte** (0–1)	—	2:53	44,904	CLE 2–1	L2
4	October 10	7:07 p.m. EDT	@ Indians	**W** 4–0	**Hernández** (1–0)	Gooden (0–1)	—	3:31	44,981	Tied 2–2	W1
5	October 11	4:07 p.m. EDT	@ Indians	**W** 5–3	**Wells** (3–0)	Ogea (0–1)	**Rivera** (1)	3:33	44,966	NYA 3–2	W2
6	October 13	8:07 p.m. EDT	Indians	**W** 9–5	**Cone** (2–0)	Nagy (1–1)	—	3:31	57,142	NYA 4–2	W3

World Series vs. San Diego Padres 4–0 (Home: 2–0; Away: 2–0)

#	Date	Time (ET)	Opponent	Score	Win	Loss	Save	Time of Game	Attendance	Series	Box/ Streak
1	October 17	8:00 p.m. EDT	Padres	**W** 9–6	**Wells** (1–0)	Wall (0–1)	**Rivera** (1)	3:29	56,712	NYA 1–0	W1
2	October 18	7:55 p.m. EDT	Padres	**W** 9–3	**Hernández** (1–0)	Ashby (0–1)	—	3:31	56,692	NYA 2–0	W2
3	October 20	8:20 p.m. EDT	@ Padres	**W** 5–4	**Mendoza** (1–0)	Hoffman (0–1)	**Rivera** (2)	3:14	64,667	NYA 3–0	W3
4	October 21	8:20 p.m. EDT	@ Padres	**W** 3–0	**Pettitte** (1–0)	Brown (0–1)	**Rivera** (3)	2:58	65,427	NYA 4–0	W4

== Player stats ==
= Indicates team leader

=== Batting ===
Note: Pos = Position; G = Games played; AB = At bats; H = Hits; Avg. = Batting average; HR = Home runs; RBI = Runs batted in

Pos	Player	G	AB	H	Avg.	HR	RBI
C	Jorge Posada	111	358	96	.268	17	63
1B	Tino Martinez	142	531	149	.281	28	123
2B	Chuck Knoblauch	150	603	160	.265	17	64
3B	Scott Brosius	152	530	159	.300	19	98
SS	Derek Jeter	149	626	203	.324	19	84
LF	Chad Curtis	151	456	111	.243	10	56
CF	Bernie Williams	128	499	169	.339	26	97
RF	Paul O'Neill	152	602	191	.317	24	116
DH	Darryl Strawberry	101	295	73	.247	24	57

==== Other batters ====
Note: G = Games played; AB = At bats; H = Hits; Avg. = Batting average; HR = Home runs; RBI = Runs batted in

Player	G	AB	H	Avg.	HR	RBI
Tim Raines	109	321	93	.290	5	47
Joe Girardi	78	254	70	.276	3	31
Luis Sojo	54	147	34	.231	0	14
Chili Davis	35	103	30	.291	3	9
Ricky Ledée	42	79	19	.241	1	12
Homer Bush	45	71	27	.380	1	5
Shane Spencer	27	67	25	.373	10	27
Dale Sveum	30	58	9	.155	0	3
Mike Lowell	8	15	4	.267	0	0
Mike Figga	1	4	1	.250	0	0

=== Starting pitchers ===
Note: G = Games pitched; IP = Innings pitched; W = Wins; L = Losses; ERA = Earned run average; SO = Strikeouts

Player	G	IP	W	L	ERA	SO
Andy Pettitte	33	216.1	16	11	4.24	146
David Wells	30	214.1	18	4	3.49	163
David Cone	31	207.2	20	7	3.55	209
Hideki Irabu	29	173.0	13	9	4.06	129
Orlando Hernández	21	141.0	12	4	3.13	131

=== Relief pitchers ===
Note: G = Games pitched; IP = Innings pitched; W = Wins; L = Losses; SV = Saves; ERA = Earned run average; SO = Strikeouts

Player	G	IP	W	L	SV	ERA	SO
Mariano Rivera	54	61.1	3	0	36	1.91	36
Mike Stanton	67	79.0	4	1	6	5.47	69
Graeme Lloyd	50	37.2	3	0	0	1.67	20
Jeff Nelson	45	40.1	5	3	3	3.79	35
Darren Holmes	34	51.1	0	3	2	3.33	31
Mike Buddie	24	41.2	4	1	0	5.62	20
Willie Banks	9	14.1	1	1	0	10.05	8
Joe Borowski	8	9.2	1	0	0	6.52	7
Jay Tessmer	7	8.2	1	0	0	3.12	6
Todd Erdos	2	2.0	0	0	0	9.00	0

=== Other pitchers ===
Note: G = Games pitched; IP = Innings pitched; W = Wins; L = Losses; ERA = Earned run average; SO = Strikeouts

Player	G	IP	W	L	SV	ERA	SO
Ramiro Mendoza	41	130.1	10	2	1	3.25	56
Ryan Bradley	5	12.2	2	1	0	5.68	13
Jim Bruske	3	9.0	1	0	0	3.00	3
Mike Jerzembeck	3	6.1	0	1	0	12.79	1

== ALDS ==
=== Game 1 ===
September 29 at Yankee Stadium (New York Yankees)

Team	1	2	3	4	5	6	7	8	9	R	H	E
Texas	0	0	0	0	0	0	0	0	0	0	5	0
New York	0	2	0	0	0	0	0	0	X	2	6	0
WP: David Wells (1-0) LP: Todd Stottlemyre (0-1) Sv: Mariano Rivera (1)

=== Game 2 ===
September 30 at Yankee Stadium (New York Yankees)

Team	1	2	3	4	5	6	7	8	9	R	H	E
Texas	0	0	0	0	1	0	0	0	0	1	5	0
New York	0	1	0	2	0	0	0	0	X	3	8	0
WP: Andy Pettitte (1-0) LP: Rick Helling (0-1) Sv: Mariano Rivera (2); Home runs: TEX: None; NYY: Shane Spencer, Scott Brosius

=== Game 3 ===
October 2 at The Ballpark in Arlington (Texas Rangers)

Team	1	2	3	4	5	6	7	8	9	R	H	E
New York	0	0	0	0	0	4	0	0	0	4	9	1
Texas	0	0	0	0	0	0	0	0	0	0	3	1
WP: David Cone (1-0) LP: Aaron Sele (0-1); Home runs: NYY: Shane Spencer, Paul O'Neill; TEX: None

== ALCS ==
New York wins the series, 4–2

Game	Home	Score	Visitor	Score	Date	Series
1	New York	7	Cleveland	2	October 6	1-0 (NYY)
2	New York	1	Cleveland	4	October 7	1-1
3	Cleveland	6	New York	1	October 9	2-1 (CLE)
4	Cleveland	0	New York	4	October 10	2-2
5	Cleveland	3	New York	5	October 11	3-2 (NYY)
6	New York	9	Cleveland	5	October 13	4-2 (NYY)

== World Series ==
=== Game 1 ===
October 17, 1998, at Yankee Stadium in New York

Team	1	2	3	4	5	6	7	8	9	R	H	E
San Diego	0	0	2	0	3	0	0	1	0	6	8	1
New York	0	2	0	0	0	0	7	0	X	9	9	1
WP: David Wells (1-0) LP: Donne Wall (0-1) Sv: Mariano Rivera (1); Home runs: SD: Greg Vaughn 2 (2), Tony Gwynn (1); NYY: Chuck Knoblauch (1), Tino Martinez (1)

=== Game 2 ===
October 18, 1998, at Yankee Stadium in New York

Team	1	2	3	4	5	6	7	8	9	R	H	E
San Diego	0	0	0	0	1	0	0	2	0	3	10	1
New York	3	3	1	0	2	0	0	0	X	9	16	0
WP: Orlando Hernández (1-0) LP: Andy Ashby (0-1); Home runs: SD: None; NYY: Bernie Williams (1), Jorge Posada (1)

=== Game 3 ===
October 20, 1998, at Qualcomm Stadium in San Diego, California

Team	1	2	3	4	5	6	7	8	9	R	H	E
New York	0	0	0	0	0	0	2	3	0	5	9	1
San Diego	0	0	0	0	0	3	0	1	0	4	7	1
WP: Ramiro Mendoza (1-0) LP: Trevor Hoffman (0-1) Sv: Mariano Rivera (2); Home runs: NYY: Scott Brosius 2 (2); SD: None

=== Game 4 ===
October 21, 1998, at Qualcomm Stadium in San Diego, California

Team	1	2	3	4	5	6	7	8	9	R	H	E
New York	0	0	0	0	0	1	0	2	0	3	9	0
San Diego	0	0	0	0	0	0	0	0	0	0	7	0
WP: Andy Pettitte (1-0) LP: Kevin Brown (0-1) Sv: Mariano Rivera (3)

== Awards and honors ==
- Scott Brosius, 3B, World Series Most Valuable Player
- David Wells, Pitcher, American League Championship Series Most Valuable Player
- David Cone, Pitcher, Hutch Award
- Derek Jeter, Shortstop, American League Leader in Runs scored, 127
- Joe Torre, Associated Press Manager of the Year
- Bernie Williams, Outfielder, 1998 American League Batting Title

All-Star Game

- Scott Brosius, 3B, reserve
- Derek Jeter, SS, reserve
- Paul O'Neill, OF, reserve
- David Wells, P, starter
- Bernie Williams, OF, reserve

== Farm system ==
Level	Team	League	Manager
AAA	Columbus Clippers	International League	Stump Merrill
AA	Norwich Navigators	Eastern League	Trey Hillman
A	Tampa Yankees	Florida State League	Lee Mazzilli
A	Greensboro Bats	South Atlantic League	Tom Nieto
A-Short Season	Oneonta Yankees	New York–Penn League	Joe Arnold
Rookie	GCL Yankees	Gulf Coast League	Ken Dominguez

LEAGUE CO-CHAMPIONS: Oneonta
