= David Cone's perfect game =

1999 Major League Baseball game

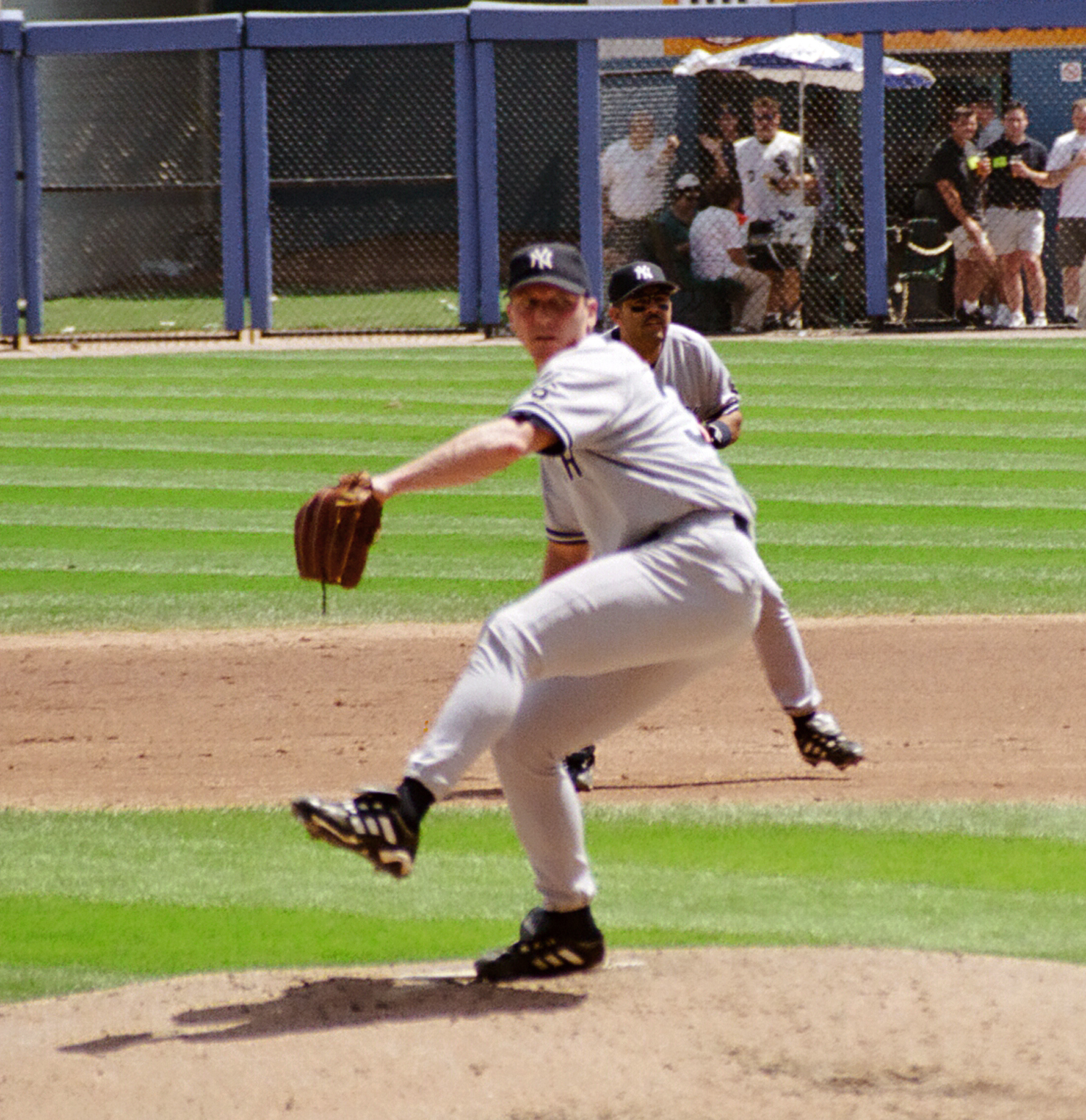
- Yankees pitcher David Cone, eleven days after his perfect game.
Montreal Expos	New York Yankees
0	6
	1	2	3	4	5	6	7	8	9	R	H	E
Montreal Expos	0	0	0	0	0	0	0	0	0	0	0	0
New York Yankees	0	5	0	0	0	0	0	1	X	6	8	0
- Date: July 18, 1999
- Venue: Yankee Stadium
- City: Bronx, New York
- Managers: Felipe Alou (Montreal Expos); Joe Torre (New York Yankees)
- Television: WNYW
- TV announcers: Bobby Murcer (play-by-play); Tim McCarver (color commentary)
- Radio: WABC
- Radio announcers: John Sterling (play-by-play) Michael Kay (color commentary)

On July 18, 1999, David Cone of the New York Yankees pitched the 16th perfect game in Major League Baseball (MLB) history and the third in team history, and the first no-hit game in regular season interleague play. Cone pitched it against the Montreal Expos at Yankee Stadium in The Bronx, with 41,930 fans in attendance. The game took 2 hours and 49 minutes, from 2:05 PM ET to 4:54 PM ET. The game was interrupted by a 33-minute rain delay in the bottom of the third inning in the middle of an at-bat for Tino Martinez. As part of the day's "Yogi Berra Day" festivities honoring the Yankees' former catcher, before the game, former Yankees pitcher Don Larsen threw the ceremonial first pitch to Berra; the two comprised the battery for Larsen's perfect game in 1956.

Cone's perfect game was the 247th no-hitter in MLB history, and 11th in Yankees history. The previous perfect game in both MLB and Yankee history was 14 months prior on May 17, 1998, when David Wells pitched a perfect game against the Minnesota Twins at Yankee Stadium; Wells' perfect game was also the most recent no-hitter in franchise history at the time. Cone's perfect game gave the Yankees the record for the franchise with most perfect games, breaking a two-perfect game tie with the Cleveland Guardians. Since Cone's perfect game, the Oakland Athletics, Philadelphia Phillies, and Chicago White Sox have recorded their second perfect games, with the White Sox tying the Yankees with a third perfect game in 2012. However, the Yankees once again took the lead on June 28, 2023, when pitcher Domingo Germán threw his own perfect game against Oakland, now standing alone with four. To date, Cone's perfect game is the only one achieved in regular-season interleague play.

== Background ==
=== Cone denied chance at a no hitter ===
Four years earlier, Cone was taken out of the game while pitching a no-hitter. At the time, he was recovering from an injury and the manager limited him to 100 pitches. He was taken out after the 7th inning. (The relief blew the no-hitter.) This "missed chance" at greatness hung over Cone until his perfect game.

=== Yogi Berra Day ===
The Yankees' third perfect game was witnessed by the battery that executed its first perfect game. Before the game began, Don Larsen, who pitched a perfect game in the 1956 World Series, threw out the ceremonial first pitch to Yogi Berra, who caught that game. It was Yogi Berra Day at the stadium, as he had recently reconciled with owner George Steinbrenner.

== Game synopsis ==
Cone never worked a count more unfavorable to the pitcher than 2–0. A 33-minute rain delay interrupted the game in the third inning. The Yankees scored most of their runs in the second inning. Chili Davis walked, then Ricky Ledée hit a two-run home run into the upper right field deck. Scott Brosius was hit by a pitch, then scored on a double by Joe Girardi. Girardi was tagged out between second and third trying to stretch the hit into a triple. Chuck Knoblauch worked a walk and then Derek Jeter hit a home run to make it 5–0. In the eighth inning, O'Neill led off with a double to right and scored on a single to center by Bernie Williams. In the third inning, Cone recorded three strikeouts. In the eighth inning Knoblauch, whose defense had significantly deteriorated since the 1997 season, made a good defensive play when Jose Vidro hit a ball hard between first and second. Knoblauch moved quickly to his left, fielded it cleanly, and made a strong throw to first, retiring Vidro and preserving the perfect game.

=== 9th inning ===
Cone struck out Chris Widger swinging to start the ninth. Ryan McGuire pinch hit for Shane Andrews and hit a soft fly ball to left field. Ricky Ledée seemed to momentarily lose the ball in the sun, but made the play, and would say afterward he was not sure how he did so. The last batter, Orlando Cabrera, popped up to third baseman Scott Brosius in foul territory to end the game. Immediately afterwards, Cone fell on his knees and into the arms of his catcher Girardi. Cone's teammates then lifted him off the field. When Cone returned to his locker, Berra and Larsen were waiting for him, and together embraced him.

== Box score ==
July 18, Yankee Stadium, New York, New York

Team	1	2	3	4	5	6	7	8	9	R	H	E
Montreal	0	0	0	0	0	0	0	0	0	0	0	0
New York	0	5	0	0	0	0	0	1	X	6	8	0
WP: David Cone (10–4) LP: Javier Vasquez (2–5); Home runs: MTL: None; NYY: Ricky Ledee (3), Derek Jeter (16)

Montreal	AB	R	H	RBI	BB	SO	AVG
Wilton Guerrero, DH	3	0	0	0	0	1	.277
Terry Jones, CF	2	0	0	0	0	1	.222
James Mouton, CF	1	0	0	0	0	1	.262
Rondell White, LF	3	0	0	0	0	1	.317
Vladimir Guerrero, RF	3	0	0	0	0	1	.286
Jose Vidro, 2B	3	0	0	0	0	0	.313
Brad Fullmer, 1B	3	0	0	0	0	1	.217
Chris Widger, C	3	0	0	0	0	2	.287
Shane Andrews, 3B	2	0	0	0	0	1	.214
Ryan McGuire, PH	1	0	0	0	0	0	.235
Orlando Cabrera, SS	3	0	0	0	0	1	.255
Totals	27	0	0	0	0	10	.000

FIELDING

- DP: Vidro-Cabrera-Fullmer.
- Outfield assists: Jones, T (Girardi at 3rd base).

Montreal	IP	H	R	ER	BB	SO	HR	ERA
Javier Vasquez (L, 2–5)	7	7	6	6	2	3	2	6.75
Bobby Ayala	1	1	0	0	0	0	0	3.49
Totals	8	8	6	6	2	3	2	6.75

New York	AB	R	H	RBI	BB	SO	AVG
Chuck Knoblauch, 2B	2	1	1	0	1	1	.268
Derek Jeter, SS	4	1	1	2	0	0	.373
Paul O'Neill, RF	4	1	1	0	0	0	.296
Bernie Williams, CF	4	0	1	1	0	0	.334
Tino Martinez, 1B	4	0	1	0	0	0	.273
Chili Davis, DH	3	1	1	0	1	0	.289
Ricky Ledée, LF	4	1	1	2	0	1	.273
Scott Brosius, 3B	2	1	0	0	0	1	.262
Joe Girardi, C	3	0	1	1	0	0	.223
Totals	30	6	8	6	2	3	.267

BATTING

- 2B: Girardi (9, Vasquez); O'Neill (20, Vasquez).
- HR: Ledee (3, off Vasquez, 2nd inning, 1 on, 1 out); Jeter (16, off Vasquez, 2nd inning, 1 on, 2 out).
- TB: Jeter 4; Ledee 4; O'Neill 2; Girardi 2; Knoblauch; T. Martínez; Williams, B; Davis, C.
- RBI: Jeter 2 (64); Ledee 2 (13); Girardi (10); Williams, B (55).
- GIDP: Davis, C.
- Team RISP: 1-for-4.
- Team LOB: 4.

New York	IP	H	R	ER	BB	SO	HR	ERA
David Cone (W, 10–4)	9	0	0	0	0	10	0	2.65
Totals	9	0	0	0	0	10	0	0.00

=== Other info ===
- HBP: Brosius, Knoblauch by Vazquez
- Pitches–strikes: Vazquez 118–76, Ayala 14–8, Cone 88–68
- Groundouts–flyouts: Vazquez 11–13, Ayala 3–0, Cone 4–13
- Batters faced: Vazquez 31, Ayala 3, Cone 27
- Umpires: HP: Ted Barrett; 1B: Larry McCoy; 2B: Jim Evans; 3B: Chuck Meriwether
- Weather: 95 °F (35 °C), mostly sunny
- Time of first pitch: 2:05PM ET
- Time: 2:49
- Attendance: 41,930
- Venue: Yankee Stadium

=== Yankee defense ===
Cone had nearly the same Yankee lineup behind him for his perfect game as David Wells did. The only exceptions were that Cone had Ledee as his left fielder and Davis as his designated hitter, while Wells was backed by Chad Curtis and Darryl Strawberry respectively. In addition, Jorge Posada, who had caught Wells' perfect game, was on the bench for Cone's perfect game.

== Aftermath ==
After his perfect game, Cone seemed to decline rapidly. He never threw another shutout in his career. In 2000, he posted a career-worst 4–14 record with a 6.91 ERA. In the 2000 World Series, he faced one batter, Mike Piazza in Game 4. It was a key at-bat, though; the Mets had two runners on, and were threatening to take the lead. Yankees' manager Joe Torre unconventionally lifted starter Denny Neagle after just 4 2/3 innings and went to Cone, who induced a Mike Piazza pop-up to end the fifth inning.
