= David Wells's perfect game =

1998 baseball event

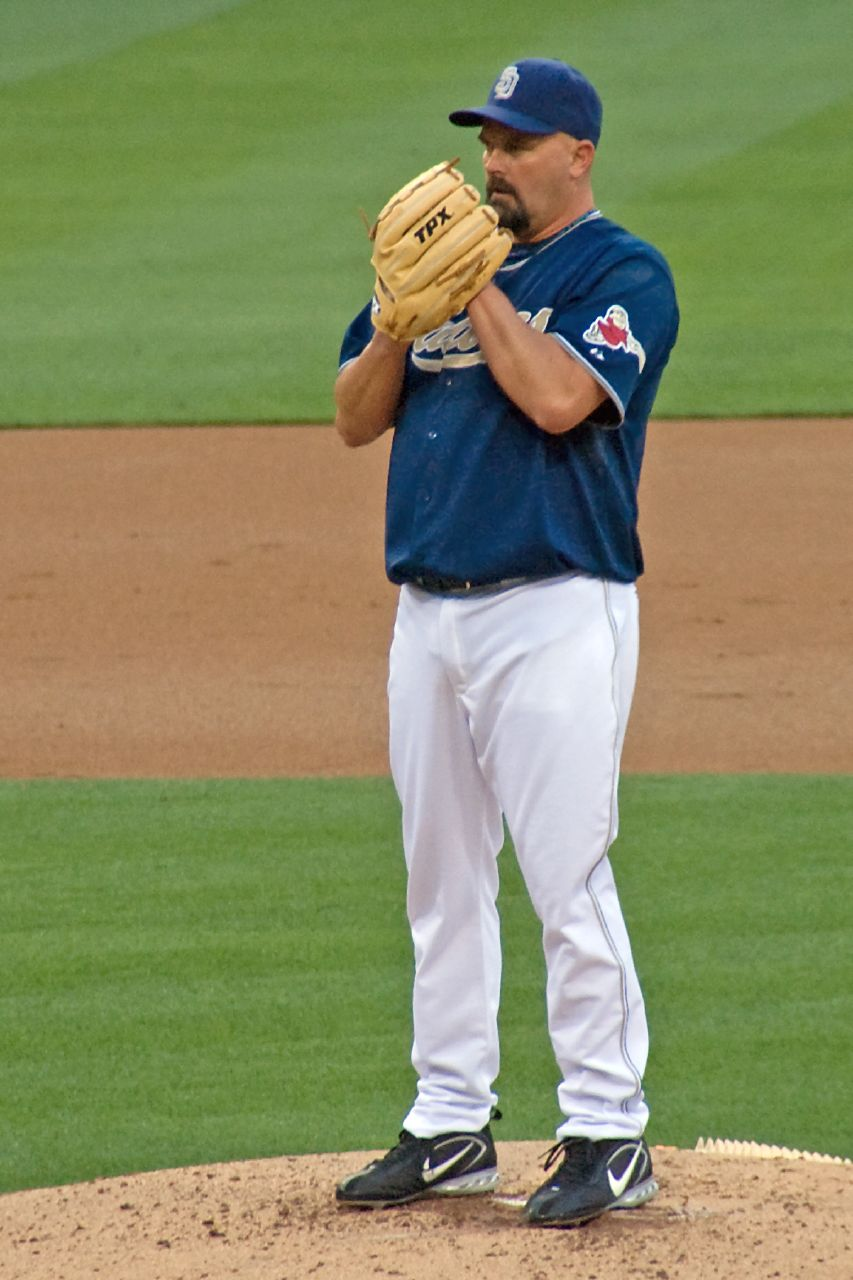
- Wells in 2007
Minnesota Twins	New York Yankees
0	4
	1	2	3	4	5	6	7	8	9	R	H	E
Minnesota Twins	0	0	0	0	0	0	0	0	0	0	0	0
New York Yankees	0	1	0	1	0	0	2	0	X	4	6	0
- Date: May 17, 1998
- Venue: Yankee Stadium
- City: New York City, New York
- Managers: Tom Kelly (Minnesota Twins); Joe Torre (New York Yankees)
- Television: MSG Network
- TV announcers: Jim Kaat (play-by-play); Ken Singleton (color commentary)
- Radio: WABC
- Radio announcers: John Sterling (play-by-play) Michael Kay (color commentary)

On May 17, 1998, David Wells of the New York Yankees pitched the 15th perfect game in Major League Baseball history and the second in team history. Pitching against the Minnesota Twins at Yankee Stadium in The Bronx in front of 49,820 fans in attendance, Wells retired all 27 batters he faced. The game took 2 hours and 40 minutes to complete, from 1:36 PM ET to 4:16 PM ET. Wells claimed in a 2001 interview with Bryant Gumbel on HBO's Real Sports that he threw the perfect game while being hung over, calling it a "raging, skull-rattling" hangover. Jimmy Fallon claimed in a 2018 interview with Seth Meyers that he and Wells had attended a Saturday Night Live after-party until 5:30 A.M. the morning of the game. In an interview, Wells also mentioned having partied with Jimmy Fallon and Seth Meyers the night before. However, there was no new episode of Saturday Night Live the previous night, as the season finale had aired the week prior; additionally, Fallon wouldn't join the cast of Saturday Night Live until that fall while Meyers wouldn't join until 2001.

Wells's perfect game was the 245th no-hitter in MLB history and the tenth no-hitter in Yankees history. It was the first regular-season perfect game pitched by a Yankee; the franchise's previous perfect game was thrown by Don Larsen during the 1956 World Series. By coincidence, Wells graduated from the same high school as Larsen - Point Loma High School in San Diego, California. The previous perfect game in MLB history was nearly four years prior, when Kenny Rogers of the Texas Rangers pitched a perfect game against the California Angels at The Ballpark In Arlington on July 28, 1994.

Wells's perfect game was the first Yankee no-hitter since Dwight Gooden's against the Seattle Mariners in May 1996. Wells's performance tied the record for franchises with most perfect games. At the time, the Cleveland Indians were the only other team to have two perfect games; David Cone added a third perfect game to Yankees history, breaking the record in July 1999. In 2023, Domingo Germán hurled the fourth in franchise history.

Three months later, on September 1, Wells took a perfect game into the seventh inning in a game against the Oakland Athletics, but he gave up a two-out single to Jason Giambi to end his bid for an unprecedented second perfect game. Wells ended up with a two-hit shutout as the Yankees won the game, 7-0.

== Game statistics ==
May 17, Yankee Stadium, New York, New York

Team	1	2	3	4	5	6	7	8	9	R	H	E
Minnesota Twins (18–24)	0	0	0	0	0	0	0	0	0	0	0	0
New York Yankees (28–9)	0	1	0	1	0	0	2	0	X	4	6	0
WP: David Wells (5–1) LP: LaTroy Hawkins (2–4); Home runs: MIN: None; NYY: Bernie Williams (3)

=== Box score ===
Minnesota	AB	R	H	RBI	BB	SO	AVG
Matt Lawton, CF	3	0	0	0	0	0	.239
Brent Gates, 2B	3	0	0	0	0	1	.123
Paul Molitor, DH	3	0	0	0	0	1	.250
Marty Cordova, LF	3	0	0	0	0	1	.247
Ron Coomer, 1B	3	0	0	0	0	2	.264
Alex Ochoa, RF	3	0	0	0	0	0	.244
Jon Shave, 3B	3	0	0	0	0	2	.143
Javier Valentín, C	3	0	0	0	0	3	.220
Pat Meares, SS	3	0	0	0	0	1	.290
Totals	27	0	0	0	0	11	.000

BATTING

- Team RISP: 0-for-0.
- Team LOB: 0.

FIELDING

- PB: Valentin, J (4).

Minnesota	IP	H	R	ER	BB	SO	HR	ERA
LaTroy Hawkins (L, 2–4)	7	6	4	4	0	5	1	5.26
Dan Naulty	1/3	0	0	0	1	0	0	5.14
Greg Swindell	2/3	0	0	0	0	1	0	3.65
Totals	8	6	4	4	1	6	1	4.50

New York (AL)	AB	R	H	RBI	BB	SO	AVG
Chuck Knoblauch, 2B	4	0	0	0	0	0	.238
Derek Jeter, SS	3	0	1	0	1	2	.337
Paul O'Neill, RF	4	0	0	0	0	2	.303
Tino Martinez, 1B	4	0	0	0	0	0	.324
Bernie Williams, CF	3	3	3	1	0	0	.314
Darryl Strawberry, DH	3	1	1	1	0	0	.272
Chad Curtis, LF	3	0	1	1	0	0	.307
Jorge Posada, C	3	0	0	0	0	1	.272
Scott Brosius, 3B	3	0	0	0	0	1	.318
Totals	30	4	6	3	1	6	.200

BATTING

- 2B: Williams, B 2 (11, Hawkins).
- 3B: Strawberry (2, Hawkins).
- HR: Williams, B (3, 4th inning off Hawkins, 0 on, 2 out).
- TB: Williams, B 8; Strawberry 3; Jeter; Curtis.
- RBI: Strawberry (19); Williams, B (19); Curtis (24).
- 2-out RBI: Williams, B.
- Team RISP: 2-for-8.
- Team LOB: 3.

BASERUNNING

- SB: Jeter (10, 2nd base off Hawkins/Valentin); Curtis (6, 2nd base off Hawkins/Valentin).

New York (AL)	IP	H	R	ER	BB	SO	HR	ERA
David Wells (W, 5–1)	9	0	0	0	0	11	0	4.45
Totals	9	0	0	0	0	11	0	0.00

=== Other info ===
- WP: Wells (5).
- Pitches-strikes: Hawkins 123–84; Naulty 7–3; Swindell 12–8; Wells 120–79.
- Groundouts-flyouts: Hawkins 5–11; Naulty 0–1; Swindell 0–1; Wells 6–10.
- Batters faced: Hawkins 27; Naulty 2; Swindell 2; Wells 27.
- Umpires: HP: Tim McClelland; 1B: John Hirschbeck; 2B: Rich Garcia; 3B: Mike Reilly.
- Weather: 59 °F (15 °C), cloudy.
- Wind: 8 mph, left to right.
- Time: 2:40.
- Attendance: 49,820.
- Venue: Yankee Stadium.

== See also ==
- List of Major League Baseball perfect games
- List of Major League Baseball no-hitters
