= Tim McClelland =

American baseball umpire (born 1951)

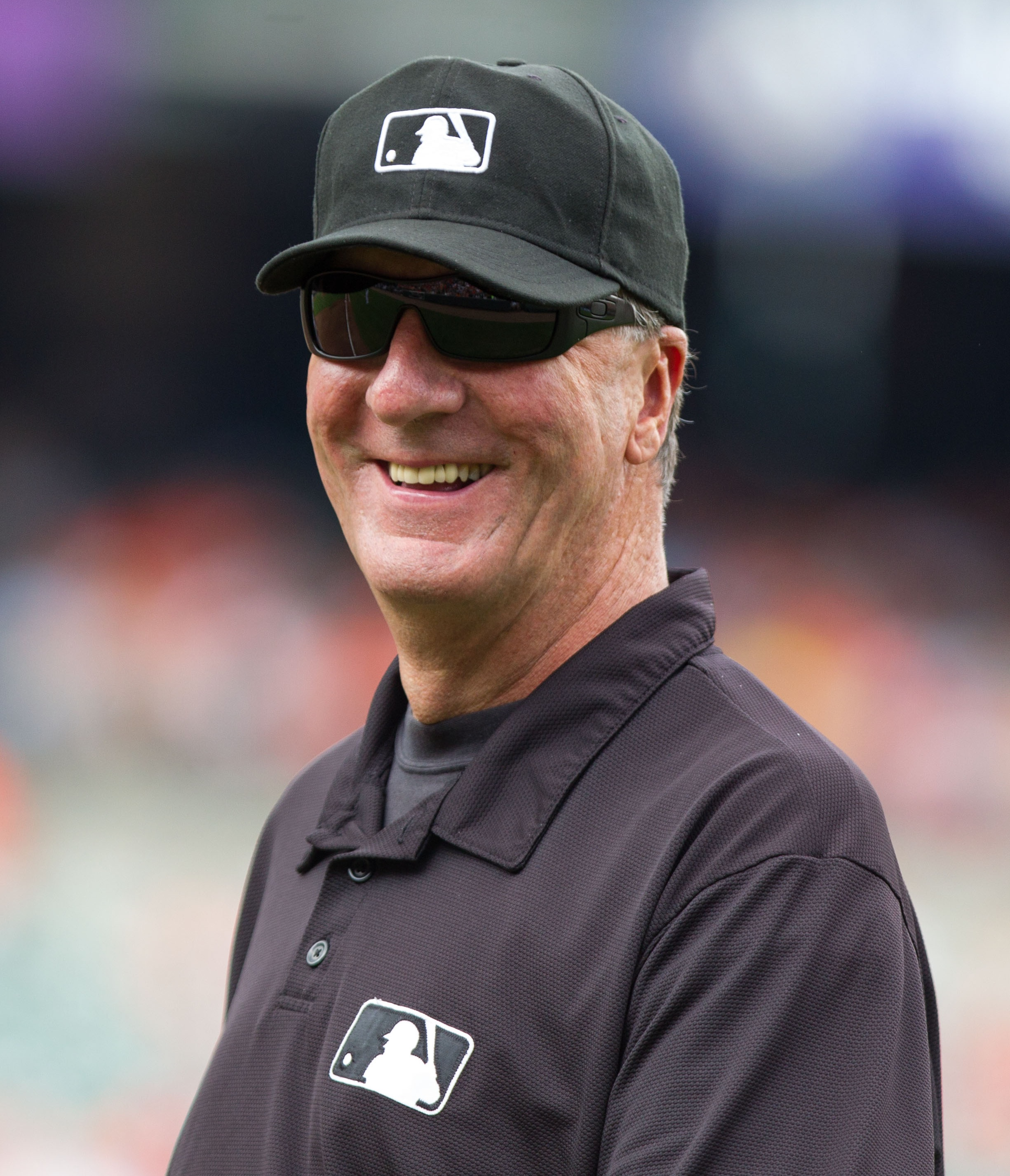
- McClelland in 2012
- Umpire
- Born: December 12, 1951 (age 73); Jackson, Michigan, U.S.

MLB debut
- September 3, 1981

Last MLB appearance
- September 29, 2013

Career highlights and awards
- Special assignments: World Series (1993, 2000, 2002, 2006); League Championship Series (1988, 1995, 1999, 2001, 2003, 2005, 2007, 2008, 2009); Division Series (2001, 1997, 2000, 2002, 2004, 2006); All-Star Games (1986, 1998, 2003); Home plate umpire for David Wells' perfect game (May 17, 1998)

Timothy Reid McClelland (born December 12, 1951) is an American former umpire in Major League Baseball who worked in the American League from 1983 to 1999 and throughout both leagues from 2000 through the 2013 season. He called many important games, from post-season games to the George Brett "Pine Tar" game in 1983. He was the plate umpire for the Sammy Sosa corked bat game on June 3, 2003, when the Chicago Cubs hosted the Tampa Bay Devil Rays at Wrigley Field. He wore uniform number 36 after his promotion to the AL, and kept the number when Major League Baseball merged the American and National League umpiring staffs in 2000.

McClelland retired as MLB's second-most senior umpire (after Joe West), and was the second tallest major league umpire at 6 feet 6 inches (1.98 m)—Jordan Baker is 6 feet 7 inches (2.01 m). McClelland was originally known for working in a kneeling position behind the plate, but switched in 2006 to a "box position," a form of squat. He was also noted for his deliberate umpiring mechanics, which earned him the nickname "Rain Delay McClelland," and for his small but consistent strike zone. Pitcher Zack Greinke said of McClelland's tight strike zone, "For some reason, he's the one umpire that scares me. I have nightmares about him."

== Umpiring career ==
McClelland has umpired in numerous noteworthy baseball games. He has been a World Series umpire four times (1993, 2000, 2002 and 2006), and worked in three All-Star games (1986, 1998 and 2003), calling balls and strikes on the last occasion. He has also called five Division Series (1997, 2000, 2002, 2004, 2006), serving as crew chief in 1997, 2004, and 2006. McClelland has officiated eight League Championship Series (1988, 1995, 1999, 2001, 2003, 2005, 2007, 2008 and 2009), serving as crew chief in 1999, 2003, 2005, 2007, 2008 and 2009.

=== Notable games ===
McClelland was the first base umpire for Jack Morris' no-hitter on April 7, 1984 and was the umpire at third base for Nolan Ryan's sixth career no-hitter on June 11, 1990. McClelland was behind the plate at Yankee Stadium when David Wells pitched a perfect game against the Minnesota Twins on May 17, 1998. McClelland was umpiring at second base on April 21, 2012, when Philip Humber threw a perfect game.

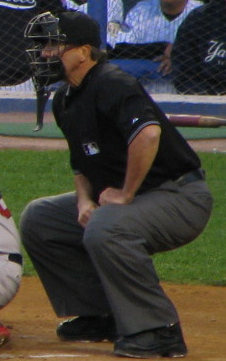
McClelland behind the plate in 2008

McClelland also was the umpire during the 2003 game where famous slugger Sammy Sosa was caught with a corked bat at Wrigley Field during the interleague game between the Tampa Bay Devil Rays and the Chicago Cubs. Sosa broke his bat hitting a routine ground out, and upon inspection of the fragments of the bat, cork was found, leading to Sosa's ejection and subsequent suspension.

McClelland was the home plate umpire for the single-game playoff to decide the NL's 2007 wild card team, in which there was question as to whether Matt Holliday ever touched home plate, resulting in the Colorado Rockies defeating the San Diego Padres 9–8 in 13 innings. He also worked the 2008 one-game playoff between the Minnesota Twins and the Chicago White Sox, which the White Sox won 1-0, on a Jim Thome home run in the 7th inning.

During a spring training game on March 19, 2013, McClelland used the rare umpiring technique of calling balls and strikes from the infield while waiting for another umpire to put on the home plate gear after home plate umpire Seth Buckminster sustained a broken left hand and was forced to leave the game.

=== Controversies ===
In his first season in the AL, McClelland was behind the plate in the infamous "Pine Tar Game" at Yankee Stadium on July 24, 1983, in which George Brett of the Kansas City Royals hit an apparent two-run home run, which was immediately protested by New York Yankees manager Billy Martin due to an obscure equipment rule. McClelland inspected Brett's bat, which had pine tar 24 inches up the handle. Because of the rule stating that pine tar cannot extend more than 18 inches up a bat handle, combined with the rule that a batter using illegal equipment should be automatically called out, McClelland called Brett out, which nullified the home run. In the melee that followed, McClelland registered the first four ejections of his career, beginning with Brett and continuing with Kansas City's manager Dick Howser, their coach Rocky Colavito, and their pitcher Gaylord Perry.

AL president Lee MacPhail later overturned McClelland's decision regarding overturning Brett's home run into an out, saying that the spirit of the rule mattered more than the one in the rulebook, and had the Yankees and Royals replay the game from after the now-counted home run. MacPhail noted that no claim had ever been made that pine tar gave the batter an unfair advantage, but rather that the rule was left over from concerns in earlier days about baseballs getting ruined from getting too much pine tar on it. A number of umpires were upset by MacPhail's decision. 27 years later, in 2012, MLB officially changed the rules wherein any protest regarding equipment must be made prior to a play.

Nine years later, McClelland was a member of the crew that worked Brett's 3,000th-hit game and was one of the first to congratulate him.

In 2007, McClelland worked home plate for the NL's Wild Card tiebreaker game between the San Diego Padres and the Colorado Rockies. In the bottom of the 13th inning, with the score even at 8–8, the Rockies scored the winning run on a sacrifice fly when McClelland called the tagging baserunner, Matt Holliday, safe at the plate. There were questions afterward as to whether Holliday had actually touched home plate on his slide. Padres manager Bud Black stated after the game that he believed Holliday did touch the plate. Following the game, McClelland told The Des Moines Register that "Michael Barrett stuck out his leg, but he didn't have it planted in the ground. What I saw was Holliday kind of slide through that leg and touch the plate." McClelland defended his deliberate safe call saying that he wanted to see if Barrett held on to the ball.

On October 20, 2009, in an American League Championship Series game between the New York Yankees and the Los Angeles Angels, McClelland made two highly publicized controversial calls. McClelland called Nick Swisher out for leaving the base too early when Swisher was tagging up on a fly ball. Some analysts contend that video replays showed this call to be erroneous. With one out in the top of the fifth inning, an apparent double play was negated when McClelland called Robinson Canó safe at third after he was tagged by Mike Napoli while not in contact with the base.

=== Retirement ===
After spending the 2014 season on umpiring's disabled list, McClelland formally retired from the MLB staff prior to the 2015 season. Accordingly, his last game umpired occurred in September 2013, but he did not officially retire until after the 2014 season.

== Personal life ==
McClelland, who received both his BA and MA from Michigan State University, resides in West Des Moines, Iowa. He is married to Sandy McClelland; they have three children.

== See also ==
- List of Major League Baseball umpires (disambiguation)
