= Mike Figga =

American baseball player (born 1970)

- Catcher
- Born: July 31, 1970 (age 56); Tampa, Florida, U.S.
- Batted: Right Threw: Right

MLB debut
- September 16, 1997, for the New York Yankees

Last MLB appearance
- October 3, 1999, for the Baltimore Orioles

MLB statistics
- Batting average: .213
- Home runs: 1
- Runs batted in: 5
- Stats at Baseball Reference

Teams
- New York Yankees (1997–1999); Baltimore Orioles (1999)

Michael Anthony Figga (born July 31, 1970) is a retired catcher in Major League Baseball who played for the New York Yankees and the Baltimore Orioles. In a three-year career, Figga hit .213 with one home run.

== Early life and education ==
Born in Tampa, Florida, Figga attended A.P. Leto High School in Tampa, graduating in 1988. Figga then enjoyed a short but standout career at Central Florida Community College. Figga was drafted in 1989 by the New York Yankees. He played in the Australian Baseball League with the Canberra Bushrangers in the 1994 and 1995 seasons.

== Major league career ==
After a long career in the minor leagues, Figga made his major-league debut on September 16, 1997, with the Yankees. Figga appeared in five games for the Yankees between 1997 and 1999. His lone major-league appearance in 1998 was on September 23, 1998, when he went one-for-four and scored a run against the Cleveland Indians. For that appearance, Figga earned a World Series ring when the Yankees won the World Series the following month.

In 1999, Figga started the season as one of three catchers on the Yankees' roster, however his mere presence caused controversy amongst the Yankee brass. Out of options, (the number of times a team is allowed to demote a player to the minor leagues without exposing him to waivers) owner George Steinbrenner ordered acting manager Don Zimmer to promote Figga to the major league roster despite offering limited opportunities to play. In fact, he saw no action at all until a doubleheader on May 22 where he was a late inning defensive replacement for both games. He never batted nor appeared in another game for the Yankees. When manager Joe Torre (who missed the first two months after being diagnosed with prostate cancer in spring training) returned, he was able to convince Steinbrenner that he needed the roster spot more than he needed the player so Figga was waived in June 1999 and picked up by the Baltimore Orioles, and played 41 games for the Orioles.

== After baseball ==
From 2000 until 2004, Figga played both in the minor leagues and for the Nashua Pride in the independent Atlantic League of Professional Baseball. He subsequently retired from baseball with an early case of the dreaded disease of catchers: bad knees. Today, Figga now works for Republic National Distribution Company and lives in the Tampa Bay area of Florida and recently finished coaching a little league football team called the Westchase Colts and a travel baseball team called the Tampa Bay Bulls.

== Sources ==
- Career statistics from Baseball Reference · Baseball Reference (Minors) · Retrosheet · Baseball Almanac
