= Paul O'Neill (baseball) =

American baseball player (born 1963)

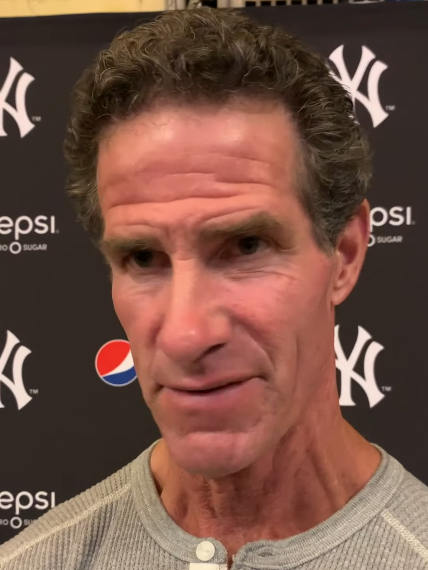
- O'Neill in 2019
- Right fielder
- Born: February 25, 1963 (age 63); Columbus, Ohio, U.S.
- Batted: Left Threw: Left

MLB debut
- September 3, 1985, for the Cincinnati Reds

Last MLB appearance
- October 7, 2001, for the New York Yankees

MLB statistics
- Batting average: .288
- Hits: 2,105
- Home runs: 281
- Runs batted in: 1,269
- Stats at Baseball Reference

Teams
- Cincinnati Reds (1985–1992); New York Yankees (1993–2001)

Career highlights and awards
- 5× All-Star (1991, 1994, 1995, 1997, 1998); 5× World Series champion (1990, 1996, 1998–2000); AL batting champion (1994); New York Yankees No. 21 retired; Monument Park honoree

Paul Andrew O'Neill (born February 25, 1963) is an American former baseball right fielder who played 17 seasons in Major League Baseball (MLB). He played for the Cincinnati Reds (1985–1992) and New York Yankees (1993–2001). O'Neill compiled 281 home runs, 1,269 runs batted in, 2,107 hits, and a lifetime batting average of .288. He won the American League batting title in 1994 with a .359 average. He was a five-time World Series champion and a five-time All-Star (1991, 1994, 1995, 1997, and 1998).

O'Neill is the only player to have played on the winning team in three perfect games. He was in right field for the Reds for Tom Browning's perfect game in 1988. He caught the final out (a fly ball) in the Yankees' David Wells' perfect game in 1998, and he made a diving catch in right field and doubled to help the Yankees win David Cone's perfect game in 1999. After retiring from playing baseball, O'Neill became a broadcaster for the Yankees on the YES Network. He currently works on the network as the lead game analyst and color commentator.

== Early life ==
Paul Andrew O'Neill was born on February 25, 1963, in Columbus, Ohio. O'Neill and his family were fans of the Cincinnati Reds. His older sister was Molly O'Neill (1952-2019), a chef, cookbook author, and food writer for The New York Times. O'Neill attended Brookhaven High School. He played baseball and basketball. In basketball, O'Neill earned all-state honors in his senior year 1981 and Central District Player of the Year.

== Professional career ==
=== Draft and minor leagues ===
O'Neill was drafted by the Reds in the fourth round of the 1981 Major League Baseball draft.

=== Cincinnati Reds (1985–1992) ===
O'Neill made his Major League debut on September 3, 1985, and singled in his first at-bat. For the rest of the 1985 season, O'Neill played in five games with four hits and one RBI. He spent most of the 1986 season in the minors. He played only in three games with the Major League team during 1986 and did not get a hit in the majors that year. O'Neill split his time between the minors and the MLB team in 1987. He appeared in 84 games for the Reds that year, batting .256 with seven home runs and 28 RBIs.

In 1988, his first full season with the Reds, O'Neill played 145 games, batting .252 with 16 home runs and 73 RBIs. In 1989, O'Neill had a similar statistical line, batting .276 on the year with 15 home runs and 74 RBIs. On July 5, he famously kicked a ball back into the infield after he bobbled it in shallow right, preventing a runner from second from scoring on the play (a single). The play is referenced on his Baseball-Reference page, where his characteristics are listed as "Bats: Left, Throws: Left, Kicks: Left".

In 1990, O'Neill played in 145 games, batting .270 with 16 home runs and 78 RBIs. O'Neill batted .277 during the 1990 postseason with a home run and five RBIs as the Reds won the World Series over the Oakland Athletics. O'Neill clashed with Reds manager Lou Piniella, who wanted O'Neill to change his swing to hit more home runs. In response to the clash, O'Neill improved greatly in 1991 by playing 152 games with a career high of 28 home runs. He batted .256 with 91 RBIs, as well. In his final season as a member of the Reds, O'Neill played in 148 games, batting .246 with 14 home runs and 66 RBIs.

=== New York Yankees (1993–2001) ===
On November 3, 1992, the Reds traded O'Neill to the Yankees for Roberto Kelly. In his first season as a Yankee, O'Neill played 141 games batting .311 with 20 home runs and 75 RBIs. During the strike-shortened 1994 season, O'Neill played 103 games with a .359 batting average, 21 home runs, and 83 RBIs, which led him to be selected to his second All-Star game. O'Neill won the batting title, and the Yankees led the East Division by six and a half games when the players' strike ended the season. He signed a four-year, $19 million contract. In 1995, O'Neill played in 127 games, batting .300 with 22 home runs, 96 RBIs, and an MLB-leading 25 double plays committed. He led the Yankees to the postseason for the first time since 1981, but they lost to the Seattle Mariners in the division series despite winning the first two games.

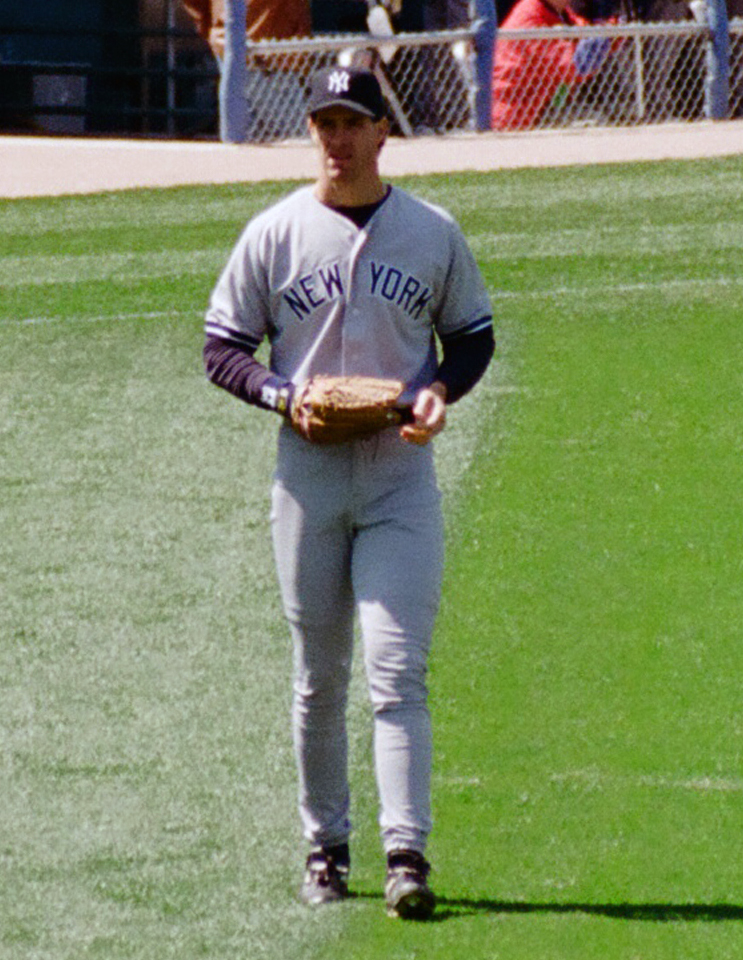
O'Neill in 1996

On April 30, 1996, O'Neill hit a long home run to Eutaw Street off of Arthur Rhodes while playing at Oriole Park at Camden Yards. O'Neill famously was his own toughest critic, seemingly never satisfied with his own performance and known for his emotion on the field; when disappointed with his performance or angry with an umpire's decision, he would attack water coolers or toss bats on the field. His tirades were both praised and criticized by the media and fans. O'Neill was involved in a brawl with Seattle catcher John Marzano. O'Neill had complained to the umpire that the previous pitch was high and inside. Marzano then hit the much bigger Paul O'Neill with a haymaker. The two grappled, and the benches cleared. During the 1996 season, O'Neill played in 150 games, batting .302 with 19 home runs, 91 RBIs, and a career-high 102 walks. He ended Game 5 of the 1996 World Series by robbing former Yankee teammate Luis Polonia of the Atlanta Braves of an extra-base hit, preserving a 1–0 victory for the Yankees. The Yankees then won the series, which was their first World Series championship since 1978.

In 1997, O'Neill played in 149 games, batting .324 with 21 home runs and 117 RBIs. He led the Yankees into the postseason again, batting .421 with two home runs and seven RBIs, but they lost the division series to the Cleveland Indians. In 1998, O'Neill played in 152 games, batting .317 with 24 home runs and 116 RBIs. He led the AL by grounding into 22 double plays. O'Neill led the Yankees into the World Series where they won against the San Diego Padres in a four-game sweep and helped the team win a record 125 games. In 1999, O'Neill played in 153 games, batting .285 with 19 home runs and 110 RBIs. O'Neill played Game 4 of the 1999 World Series just hours after his father died. The Yankees eventually won the game and swept the Braves to win their 25th World Series championship.

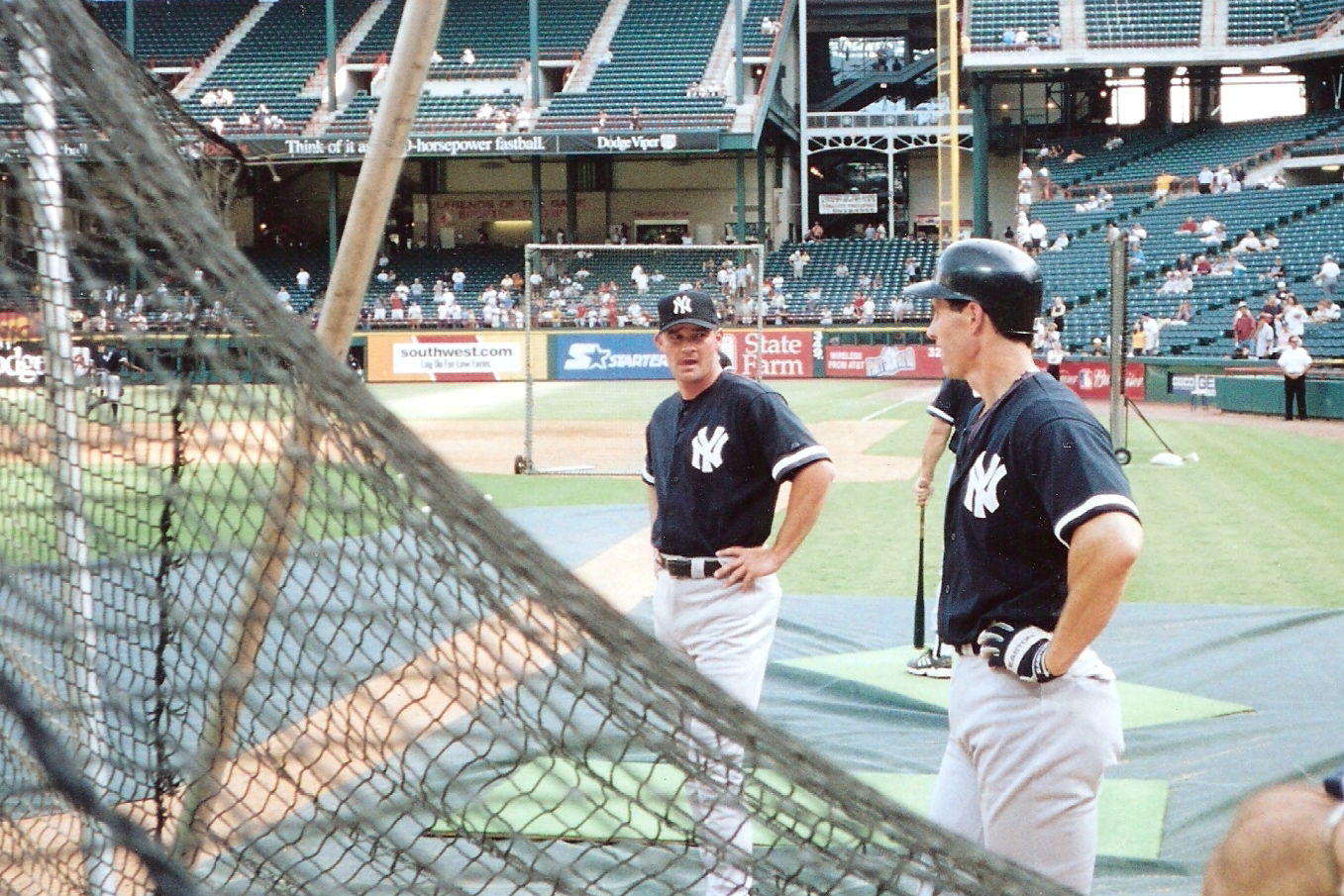
O'Neill (right) with Gary Denbo in 2001

In 2000, O'Neill played in 142 games, batting .283 with 18 home runs and 100 RBIs. He led the Yankees to the postseason again as they won the World Series over the New York Mets. In 2001, O'Neill played in 137 games, batting .267 with 21 home runs and 70 RBIs. In Game 5 of the 2001 World Series, O'Neill received a sendoff from New York fans. While standing in right field in the 9th inning with the Yankees down 2–0, the entire stadium chanted his name. When the inning ended, O'Neill was still being cheered. With tears in his eyes, he tipped his cap, and another roar went up from the crowd at Yankee Stadium. The Yankees won the game 3–2, but they lost the series four games to three.

=== Career statistics ===
G	AB	R	H	2B	3B	HR	RBI	SB	BB	AVG	OBP	SLG	FLD%
2,053	7,318	1,041	2,105	451	21	281	1,269	141	892	.288	.363	.470	.988

In 85 post-season games, O'Neill batted .284 (85-for-299) with 39 runs, 17 doubles, 2 triples, 11 home runs, 39 RBI, 5 stolen bases, 38 walks, .363 on-base percentage, and .465 slugging percentage.

== Legacy ==
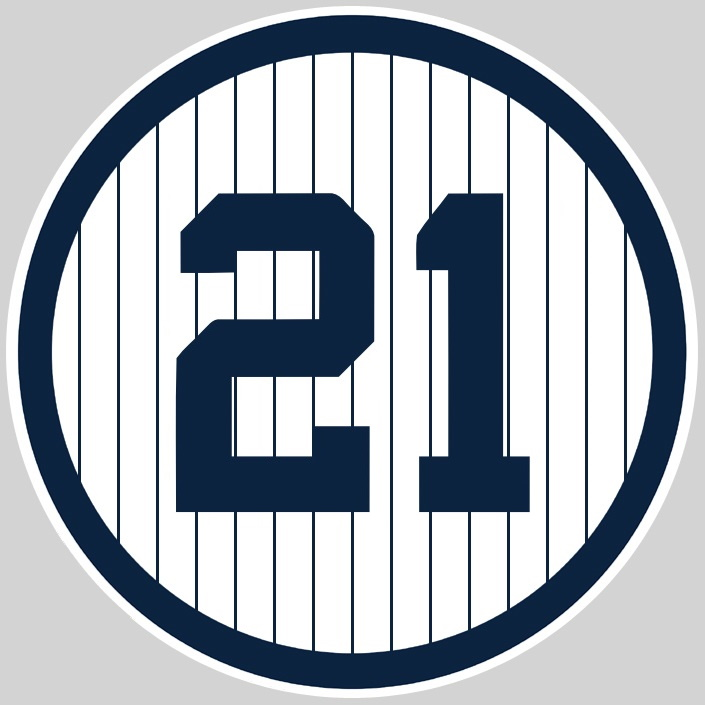
Paul O'Neill's number 21 was retired by the New York Yankees in 2022.

Yankee owner George Steinbrenner labeled O'Neill as a "Warrior." He was given this nickname due to his passion and love for the game. Since his retirement after the 2001 World Series, his number 21 was only worn once, when relief pitcher LaTroy Hawkins briefly wore the number to start the 2008 season. On April 16, 2008, Hawkins switched to number 22 in response to the criticism he received by many Yankee fans.

The Yankees honored O'Neill with a plaque in Monument Park on August 9, 2014. The Yankees retired O'Neill's number 21 on August 21, 2022, at Yankee Stadium. Because O'Neill had not been vaccinated against COVID-19, the team had to make changes to the retirement ceremony to comply with its health protocols; no current Yankees joined O'Neill on the field, and he did not visit any of the broadcast booths during the game.

== Television ==
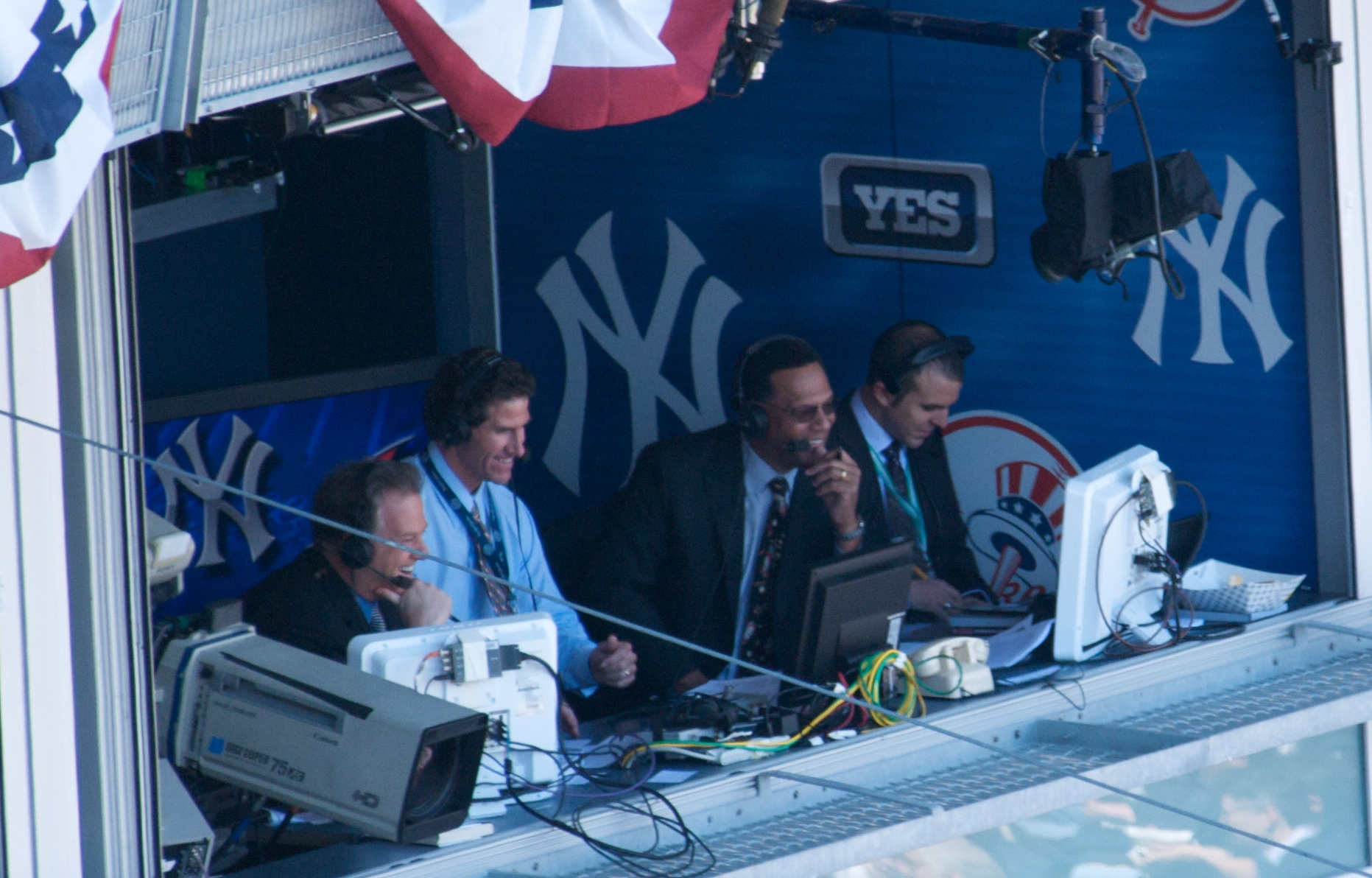
Left to right: Michael Kay, O'Neill, and Ken Singleton broadcasting a Yankees game in 2009.

In 1995, while still a player for the Yankees, O'Neill had a cameo role on the NBC sitcom Seinfeld. In the episode "The Wink", Cosmo Kramer approaches O'Neill in the Yankees' locker room and says that he must hit two home runs in the next game to fulfill the wish of a sick little boy. In the ensuing game, which is entirely offscreen, O'Neill hits one home run and achieves an inside-the-park home run which is scored a triple due to the other team's error. Though "The Wink" was the fourth episode broadcast during Seinfeld's seventh season, O'Neill's scene was the first scene filmed for that season. He is also mentioned in the Friends episode "The One with Rachel's Big Kiss".

=== Broadcasting career (2002–present) ===
O'Neill with former teammate Derek Jeter at Yankee Stadium in 2014, while serving as a commentator for the YES Network

Since retiring from baseball in 2001, O'Neill has served as an analyst on the New York Yankees Pre-Game Show and the New York Yankees Post-Game Show, as well as a color commentator for the YES Network. O'Neill returned to Ohio to live with his family.

On July 7, 2009, O'Neill was inducted into the Irish-American Baseball Hall of Fame (18 W. 33rd St. inside Foley's NY Pub & Restaurant) in New York City along with longtime Los Angeles Dodgers owner Walter O'Malley, broadcaster Vin Scully, former player Steve Garvey, umpire Jim Joyce, and blind sports reporter Ed Lucas.

During the 2020 and 2021 seasons, due to social-distancing requirements related to the COVID-19 pandemic, O'Neill participated in Yankees broadcasts remotely from a basement studio nicknamed "Studio 21" in his Ohio home.

During the 2022 season, the Yankees relaxed their social-distancing requirements, but O'Neill continued to call games remotely from Studio 21. The New York Post reported that this is because he had not been vaccinated against COVID-19. Despite this, he did appear in person for his number retirement ceremony in August 2022. O'Neill returned to the YES broadcast booth during the 2023 season after the company relaxed its vaccine requirements.

== Writing ==
After retiring from his playing career, O'Neill authored a book entitled Me and My Dad: A Baseball Memoir. The book discusses his relationship with his father, who instilled in him a love for the game of baseball.

In 2022, O'Neill released Swing and a Hit: Nine Innings of What Baseball Taught Me, written with Jack Curry.

== Personal life ==
O'Neill and his wife, Nevalee, were neighbors in Columbus. They have three children, and live in Montgomery, Ohio. His nephew, Michael, also played baseball in the Yankees organization.

At a press conference in Jupiter, Florida, in March 2016, O'Neill endorsed Donald Trump for president.

== See also ==
- List of Major League Baseball career home run leaders
- List of Major League Baseball career hits leaders
- List of Major League Baseball career doubles leaders
- List of Major League Baseball career runs scored leaders
- List of Major League Baseball career runs batted in leaders
- List of Major League Baseball batting champions
