= Mike Jerzembeck =

American baseball player (born 1972)

- Pitcher
- Born: May 18, 1972 (age 54); Queens, New York, U.S.
- Batted: Right Threw: Right

MLB debut
- August 8, 1998, for the New York Yankees

Last MLB appearance
- September 23, 1998, for the New York Yankees

MLB statistics
- Win–loss record: 0–1
- Earned run average: 12.79
- Strikeouts: 1
- Stats at Baseball Reference

Teams
- New York Yankees (1998)

Michael Joseph Jerzembeck (born May 18, 1972) is an American former Major League Baseball pitcher who played for the New York Yankees in 1998.

== Amateur career ==
A native of Queens, New York, Jerzembeck attended the University of North Carolina, and in 1993 he played collegiate summer baseball with the Cotuit Kettleers of the Cape Cod Baseball League. He was drafted by the New York Yankees in the 5th round of the 1993 Major League Baseball draft, and was signed June 17, 1993.

== Professional career ==
During spring training in 1998, Jerzembeck was hit with a throw from Jorge Posada and suffered a bruised pitching elbow in what Buster Olney described as "a freakish play." He spent the majority of the season in the International League with the Columbus Clippers and suffered a loss of velocity on his fastball and inconsistency with his curveball. He made his Major League debut on August 8, 1998, striking out Dean Palmer in one inning in relief of Orlando Hernández. He appeared in two more games that season, putting up a 12.79 ERA in two starts and one relief appearance. Following the season, James Andrews performed surgery on his injured elbow.

Jerzembeck missed the entirety of the 1999 and 2000 seasons due to elbow and shoulder surgeries. The Yankees released Jerzembeck on June 13, 2001, after ten appearances with the Norwich Navigators of the Eastern League. He signed a minor league contract with the Minnesota Twins on March 13, 2002. He missed the beginning of the season due to continuing elbow problems. The 2002 season was the last in which he played; he pitched parts of the season with the [[Gulf Coast League Twins]], New Britain Rock Cats and Edmonton Trappers.

In September 2005, James Andrews performed an arthroscopic surgery on Jerzembeck's elbow.

== Personal life ==
Jerzembeck's son, Satchel, was named after Satchel Paige and committed to play baseball at North Carolina. His son, Eli, also plays baseball.
