= Mike Buddie =

American baseball player (born 1970)

Current position
- Title: Athletic director
- Team: TCU
- Conference: Big 12

Biographical details
- Born: December 12, 1970 (age 55); Berea, Ohio, U.S.

Playing career

Baseball
- 1989–1992: Wake Forest
- Position: Pitcher

Administrative career (AD unless noted)
- 2003–2015: Wake Forest (assistant AD)
- 2015–2019: Furman
- 2019–2024: Army
- 2025–present: TCU

Baseball career
- Pitcher
- Batted: Right Threw: Right

MLB debut
- April 6, 1998, for the New York Yankees

Last MLB appearance
- May 26, 2002, for the Milwaukee Brewers

MLB statistics
- Win–loss record: 5–4
- Earned run average: 4.67
- Strikeouts: 76
- Stats at Baseball Reference

Teams
- New York Yankees (1998–1999); Milwaukee Brewers (2000–2002)

Michael Joseph Buddie (born December 12, 1970) is an American former professional baseball pitcher and the current athletic director at Texas Christian University. He played in Major League Baseball (MLB) from 1998 to 2002 with the New York Yankees and Milwaukee Brewers.

== Baseball career ==
Buddie attended Wake Forest University, and in 1990 and 1991 he played collegiate summer baseball with the Cotuit Kettleers of the Cape Cod Baseball League. Buddie was selected by the New York Yankees in the fourth round of the 1992 MLB draft. He played for the Yankees and the Milwaukee Brewers from 1998 to 2002. In 87 career games, he had a 5–4 record with a 4.67 ERA. He batted and threw right-handed. Buddie was also the pitching coach who prepared Kevin Costner for Costner's stint as a pitcher in Sam Raimi's film For Love of the Game (1999). Buddie also had a brief speaking role as the character Jack Spellman in that film.

== Athletics administration career ==
After retiring from baseball in 2003, Buddie returned to his alma mater to begin a career in athletics administration. He spent nearly a decade at Wake Forest serving in various postings within their athletic department. These included: sport administrator for baseball, women's soccer, and men's golf; assistant administrator for football and men's basketball; senior associate athletic director for administration/development; and director of the Varsity Club, as well as others.

In 2015, Buddie was hired to serve as athletic director at Furman University. While at Furman, Buddie negotiated a multi-year partnership with Nike, produced the athletic department's first balanced budget, and spearheaded an effort to bring the NCAA Men's Basketball Tournament back to upstate South Carolina in 2017 (landing two future tournament stops). He also secured three separate $1 million endowments in support of the football and volleyball programs. Furman won 26 Southern Conference championships under Buddie's leadership.

Buddie was named athletic director at the United States Military Academy on May 30, 2019. Under his watch, the Army Black Knights football team joined the American Athletic Conference in 2024, which they won that year, while Michie Stadium underwent a $170 million renovation. Buddie was also involved in extending Army's football broadcast contract with CBS Sports Network through 2028.

On January 1, 2025, Texas Christian University appointed Buddie as the new athletic director.

Buddie served on the NCAA Division I Baseball Committee from 2015 to 2024.
