= Ryan Bradley (baseball) =

American baseball player (born 1975)

- Pitcher
- Born: October 26, 1975 (age 50); Covina, California, U.S.
- Batted: Right Threw: Right

MLB debut
- August 22, 1998, for the New York Yankees

Last MLB appearance
- September 23, 1998, for the New York Yankees

MLB statistics
- Win–loss record: 2–1
- Earned run average: 5.68
- Strikeouts: 13
- Stats at Baseball Reference

Teams
- New York Yankees (1998)

Ryan James Bradley (born October 26, 1975) is an American former professional baseball pitcher. He played in Major League Baseball (MLB) for the New York Yankees. He bats and throws right-handed.

== Career ==
Bradley was drafted by the New York Yankees in the 1st round of the 1997 Major League Baseball draft; he was drafted 40th overall. He played only in 1998 with the Yankees. Bradley had a 2–1 record in 5 games, with a 5.86 ERA and 13 strikeouts across 12 2/3 innings pitched.

He attended Arizona State University.
