= LaTroy Hawkins =

American baseball player (born 1972)

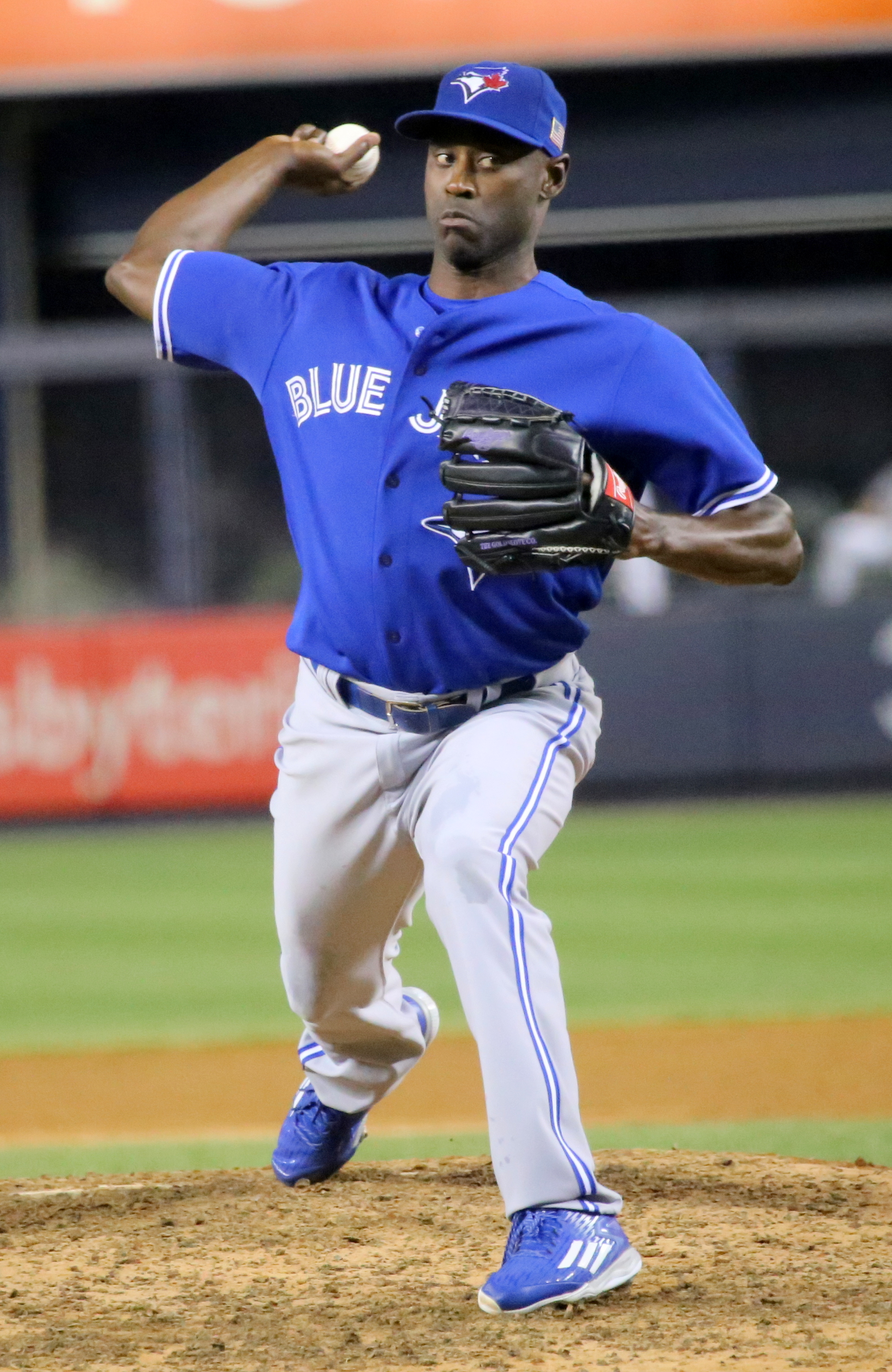
- Hawkins with the Toronto Blue Jays in 2015

Minnesota Twins – No. 32
- Pitcher
- Born: December 21, 1972 (age 53); Gary, Indiana, U.S.
- Batted: Right Threw: Right

MLB debut
- April 29, 1995, for the Minnesota Twins

Last appearance
- October 3, 2015, for the Toronto Blue Jays

MLB statistics
- Win–loss record: 75–94
- Earned run average: 4.31
- Strikeouts: 983
- Saves: 127
- Stats at Baseball Reference

Teams
- As player: Minnesota Twins (1995–2003); Chicago Cubs (2004–2005); San Francisco Giants (2005); Baltimore Orioles (2006); Colorado Rockies (2007); New York Yankees (2008); Houston Astros (2008–2009); Milwaukee Brewers (2010–2011); Los Angeles Angels of Anaheim (2012); New York Mets (2013); Colorado Rockies (2014–2015); Toronto Blue Jays (2015); As coach: Minnesota Twins (2026–present)

LaTroy Hawkins (born December 21, 1972) is an American former professional baseball pitcher who currently serves as the bullpen coach for the Minnesota Twins of Major League Baseball (MLB). In his 21-year MLB career, he played for the Twins, Chicago Cubs, San Francisco Giants, Baltimore Orioles, Colorado Rockies, New York Yankees, Houston Astros, Milwaukee Brewers, Los Angeles Angels of Anaheim, New York Mets, and Toronto Blue Jays. Through the 2020 season, his 1,042 games pitched were the 10th-most of any major league player. He has also registered saves against all 30 MLB teams.

Born and raised in Gary, Indiana, Hawkins was a seventh-round draft pick of the Twins out of high school. He debuted with the team in 1995 and reached the major leagues for good in 1997. After posting some of the worst earned run averages (ERA) in the American League (AL) in 1998 and 1999, Hawkins was moved to the bullpen in 2000. He struggled as the Twins' closer in 2001 but found better success thereafter in a setup role, posting a career-low 1.86 ERA in 2003 and reaching the playoffs in 2002 and 2003 with Minnesota.

In 2004, the Cubs signed Hawkins to set up for closer Joe Borowski, but he blew several saves and became unpopular with the team's fans. He was traded to the Giants in 2005 and served as a setup man again for various teams for the next few seasons. He reached the World Series with the Rockies in 2007, though the team was swept by the Boston Red Sox in four games. Hawkins joined the Yankees in 2008, struggled, and was traded to the Astros, where he was very effective. In 2009, he filled in for an injured José Valverde as the Astros' closer and posted a 2.13 ERA. He signed a two-year contract with the Brewers after the season and reached the playoffs with Milwaukee again in 2011.

After spending a year with the Angels in 2012, Hawkins had to sign a minor league contract with the Mets in 2013. He made their roster and had become their closer by the end of the year. In 2014, as the oldest player in the NL, he served as Colorado's closer. In 2015, he reached the playoffs with the Blue Jays before retiring at the end of the year.

== Amateur career ==
Hawkins was born and raised in Gary, Indiana. Hawkins' father was absent, and he was raised primarily by his mother, Debra, and his maternal grandparents. Growing up, he played baseball with broom handles, not getting to use a glove until he started playing Little League Baseball. Hawkins attended West Side High School. At West Side, he competed in basketball against Glenn Robinson and received a full scholarship offer to play college basketball at Indiana State. Hawkins also participated in track and field and the 1600 meters relay while in high school. Initially, he favored basketball over baseball, but Hawkins chose to pursue a baseball career after his grandfather told him that the latter was his better sport.

== Professional career ==
=== Minnesota Twins (1995–2003) ===
Hawkins was drafted straight out of high school by the Minnesota Twins in the seventh round of the 1991 Major League Baseball (MLB) draft and received a $47,500 signing bonus. He spent the next four years in the Twins' minor league system before making the team's starting rotation out of spring training in 1995. His MLB debut on April 29, 1995, was a disastrous start against the Baltimore Orioles, where he gave up seven earned runs on seven hits in only 1 2/3 innings of work. After losing his first three starts, Hawkins was demoted to the Salt Lake Buzz of the Triple-A Pacific Coast League in May when the Twins had to shrink their roster. (Note: Due to the 1994 Major League Baseball strike, teams were allowed to carry 28 players on their rosters for the first few weeks of the 1995 Major League Baseball season.) Promoted again in September, he won for the first time in the second game of a doubleheader against the Kansas City Royals on September 18. Altogether, Hawkins made six starts with a 2–3 record and an 8.67 earned run average (ERA). He began 1996 in the Twins' rotation as well, and struck out 10 batters in a win over the Detroit Tigers on April 25. However, he was demoted to the Buzz in May after posting an 8.20 ERA in seven starts for the Twins. This time, he was not promoted in September.

For the 1997 season, Hawkins started out pitching in Salt Lake City. Though his ERA with the Buzz was 5.45, his record was 9–4. He was promoted to the Twins in June, spending the rest of the season in their rotation. In 20 starts, he compiled a 6–12 record and a 5.84 ERA. Though his first start had not come until June 17, his 12 losses tied him with 11 other pitchers for 10th in the American League (AL).

1998 was the first year that Hawkins spent an entire season in the Twins' rotation. On May 17, he was the opposing starting pitcher during David Wells' perfect game. Hawkins led the team with 33 starts but sported a 7–14 record, leading the team in most runs allowed (126) and walks (70). He had the worst walks plus hits per inning pitched (WHIP) figure among Twins starters, with a 1.53 mark. His 5.25 ERA ranked him 88th out of 97 pitchers who threw enough innings to qualify for the MLB ERA title, and his 14 losses tied him with four other pitchers for eighth in the AL.

In 1999, for the second year in a row, Hawkins made 33 starts. He won 10 games this time but lost 14 again, and his 6.66 ERA was the worst among MLB starters who pitched enough innings to qualify for the ERA title. Hawkins led the AL in earned runs allowed (129), and his 14 losses were tied with four other pitchers for fourth in the AL.

Hawkins was moved to the bullpen in 2000. Twins manager Tom Kelly, unable to decide who he wanted as his full-time closer, used both Hawkins and Bob Wells in the role throughout the year. Hawkins appeared in 66 games, posting a 2–5 record and an ERA of 3.39. After never having recorded a save before, he converted 14 without blowing any chances.

By 2001, Hawkins was the everyday closer. He converted his first nine save opportunities, stretching his streak of consecutive saves recorded to 23 before he finally blew a save on May 5, against the Royals. As the season wore on, however, his ERA climbed to almost 6.00, and he was replaced as the closer by Eddie Guardado. He led the Twins in saves (28) but recorded a 5.96 ERA and a 1.91 WHIP in 61 games.

Over the next two seasons, Hawkins served as a setup man for Guardado. In 2002, Hawkins was used mainly in the seventh and eighth innings. He appeared in 65 games, winning all six of his decisions, posting a 2.13 ERA, and striking out 63 hitters in 80 1/3 innings pitched. The Twins won the AL Central Division title, and Hawkins made three appearances in the AL Division Series (ALDS) against the Oakland Athletics, striking out five batters in 2 1/3 scoreless innings as the Twins defeated Oakland in five games. He appeared in four games in the AL Championship Series (ALCS) against the Anaheim Angels as well, but his ERA was 20.25 this time, and the Angels defeated the Twins in four games. The next season, he was primarily used in the eighth inning. He posted a 9–3 record and struck out 75 hitters in 77 1/3 innings. His 1.86 ERA was fifth-lowest among AL pitchers who threw at least 60 innings, and his 74 appearances were fifth-highest among AL pitchers. For the second year in a row, the Twins won the AL Central Division title, this time facing the New York Yankees in the ALDS. In Game 1, Hawkins was awarded the win after pitching a scoreless seventh and eighth innings. However, he would post a 6.00 ERA in three appearances in the series, which the Yankees won three games to one. Hawkins became a free agent after the 2003 season.

=== Chicago Cubs (2004–2005) ===
In December 2003, Hawkins signed a three-year, $11.2 million contract with the Chicago Cubs. He began the year as the eighth-inning setup man for Cubs closer Joe Borowski, but Borowski was sidelined with an injury in early June, and Hawkins took over closing duties. On September 11, Hawkins threw an immaculate inning, striking out the side on only nine pitches in a game against the Florida Marlins. He posted a 2.63 ERA and recorded 25 saves in 75 games for the Cubs in 2004. However, Hawkins also blew nine saves, including two (against the New York Mets on September 25 and the Cincinnati Reds on September 29) during a late-season losing streak that cost the Cubs the wild card. The blown saves earned him the ire of Cubs fans, who made a habit of booing him loudly at Wrigley Field when he came on in relief. Hawkins feuded with fans and media, and his relationship with both deteriorated.

Hawkins converted four saves early in the 2005 season but blew an equal number of opportunities. In early May, the Cubs replaced him as closer with Ryan Dempster, who was moved out of the starting rotation. Through 21 games with the team that season, Hawkins had a 1–4 record and a 3.32 ERA. On May 28, the Cubs traded Hawkins to the San Francisco Giants in exchange for pitchers Jerome Williams and David Aardsma.

=== San Francisco Giants (2005) ===
With the Giants, Hawkins assumed an eighth inning setup role, frequently preceding closer Tyler Walker. When Hawkins returned to Wrigley Field in late July, he was booed again by the Cubs fans. He suffered another blown save during the series on July 26, but the Giants won the game 3–2. In 45 games with the Giants, Hawkins had a 1–4 record and a 4.10 ERA. Between the Cubs and Giants, Hawkins's record was 2–8 in 66 games, with an ERA of 3.83. He allowed 58 hits in 56 1/3 innings pitched and posted a 1.46 WHIP. On December 6, Hawkins was traded along with cash considerations to the Baltimore Orioles for left-handed reliever Steve Kline.

=== Baltimore Orioles (2006) ===
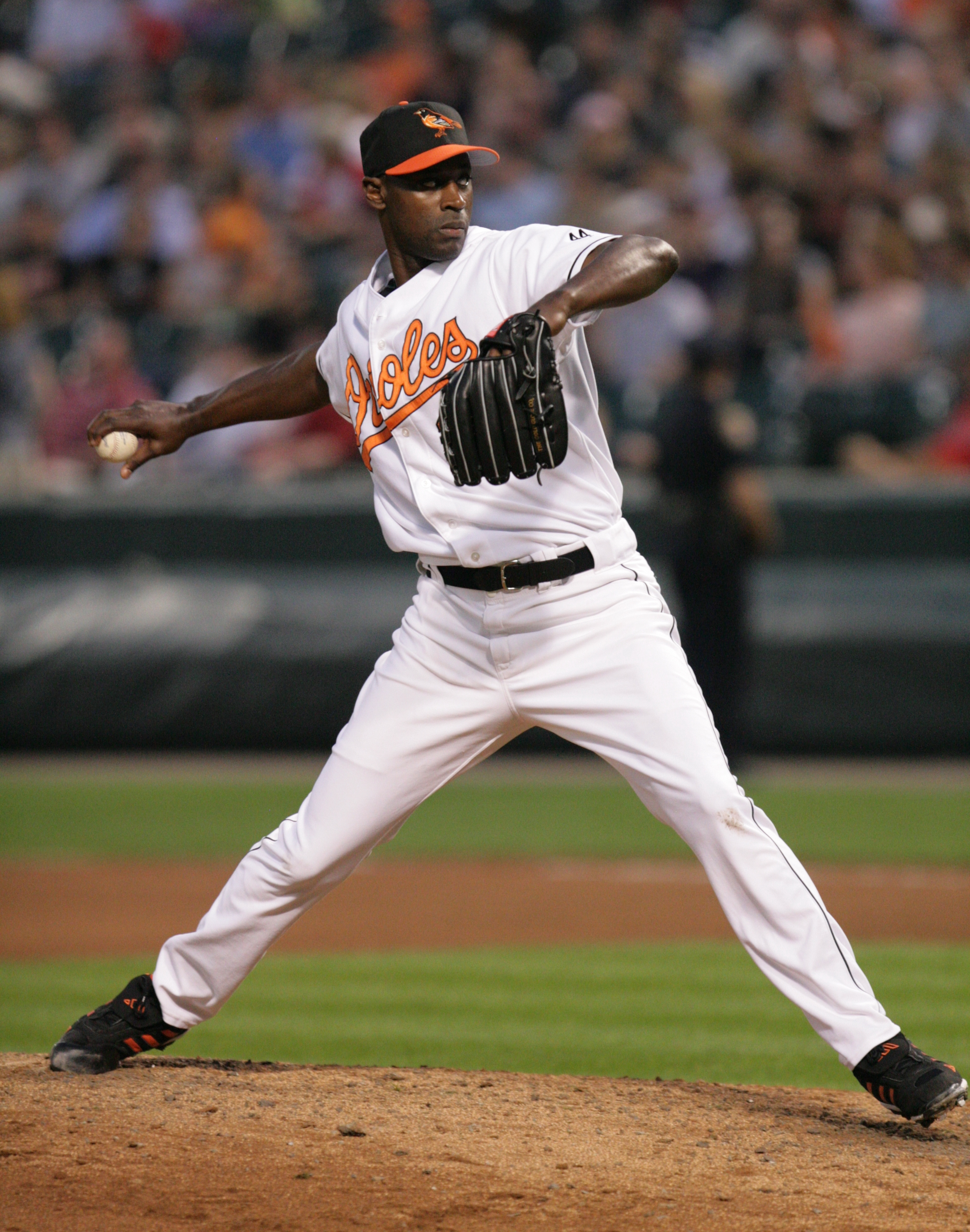
Hawkins with the Baltimore Orioles in 2006

With the Orioles in 2006, Hawkins served as the eighth inning setup man for closer Chris Ray. He spent one season with the Orioles, going 3–2 with a 4.48 ERA and no saves in 60 games. After the season, he became a free agent. Following his departure from Baltimore, he criticized the negative atmosphere that plagued the losing team's clubhouse. "Yeah, it was bad," he stated. "I don't want to knock the Orioles, but it was just bad. Bad."

=== Colorado Rockies (2007) ===
On December 5, 2006, Hawkins signed a one-year, $3.25 million contract with the Colorado Rockies, who wanted him to serve as the eighth inning setup man for closer Brian Fuentes. From April 24 to May 22, Hawkins was on the disabled list due to right elbow inflammation. On July 8, when the Philadelphia Phillies helped the Coors Field groundskeepers get the tarp placed on the field during a heavy storm, Hawkins was the only member of the home team to join them in assisting. In 62 games, Hawkins had a 2–5 record, a 3.42 ERA, and zero saves. At the end of the regular season, the Rockies forced a tie-breaker game against the San Diego Padres to determine the NL wild card team. Hawkins pitched a scoreless seventh inning, and the Rockies eventually won the game 9–8 in 13 innings to reach the playoffs for the first time in their history. He made three appearances for the Rockies in the NLDS (Game 1) and NLCS (Games 2 and 4), pitching a scoreless seventh inning each time as the Rockies won seven straight games to earn a trip to the World Series. There, he pitched the last inning of Games 1 and 3 against the Boston Red Sox, allowing Mike Lowell to score on a sacrifice fly hit by Jason Varitek in the latter as Colorado lost four straight games. After the season, he became a free agent.

=== New York Yankees (2008) ===
On December 9, 2007, Hawkins signed a one-year, $3.75 million contract with the New York Yankees. He had previously worn uniform No. 32 with the Rockies. However, since the Yankees had retired that number in honor of Elston Howard, Hawkins switched to No. 21 for the 2008 season, becoming the first Yankee to wear that number since outfielder Paul O'Neill in 2001. After returning from a road trip on April 16, however, Hawkins switched to No. 22 in response to the fans' booing, yelling, and calling O'Neill's name when he took the field.

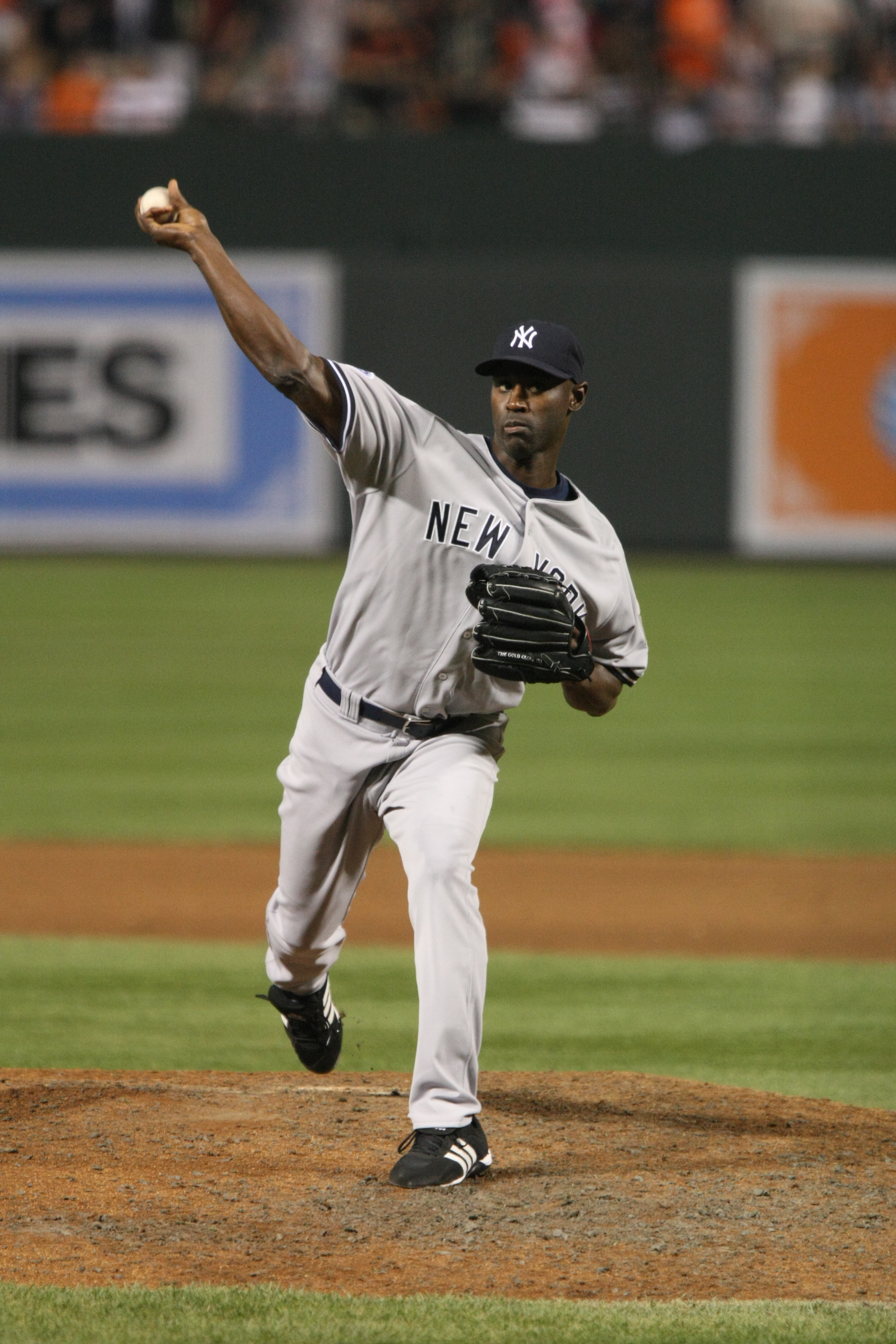
Hawkins pitching for the New York Yankees in 2008

On May 20, during a game against the Baltimore Orioles, Hawkins threw a head-high pitch over left fielder Luke Scott. Hawkins was ejected by home plate umpire Chuck Meriwether, and Scott accused him of deliberately throwing the ball over his head, though Hawkins said he was just pitching inside. Hawkins was suspended by MLB for three games and fined an undisclosed amount.

Hawkins pitched unimpressively with the Yankees in 2008, going 1–1 with a 5.71 ERA in 33 relief appearances. On July 26, he was designated for assignment.

=== Houston Astros (2008–2009) ===
On July 30, 2008, the Houston Astros acquired Hawkins from the Yankees for minor leaguer Matt Cusick. The trade was made because the Astros needed someone to help Doug Brocail in late-inning setup situations. Hawkins pitched 21 innings out of the bullpen and allowing just one earned run over that span (good for a 0.43 ERA). "No one could have imagined Hawkins would respond with a nearly perfect two-month run with his new team," praised Alyson Footer of MLB.com. Hawkins signed a one-year deal with the Astros to return for the 2009 season.

Just before the 2009 World Baseball Classic began in March, Hawkins was added to the roster for the United States national baseball team when Joe Nathan had to drop out because of a sore shoulder. He pitched in four games in the tournament, winning one and posting a 7.36 ERA. The United States was eliminated by Japan in the semifinals.

From late April through the middle of June 2009, Hawkins served as Houston's closer, as regular closer José Valverde was sidelined with a calf injury. While Valverde was out, Hawkins was 9-for-11 in save opportunities. When Valverde returned, Hawkins again assumed an eighth-inning setup role. From July 28 through August 12, 2009, Hawkins was on the disabled list because of back pain caused by shingles. "Hugs were completely out of the question," he described the pain. In 65 games, Hawkins sported an ERA of 2.13 in 65 games, the lowest ERA he had since 2003. He had a 1–4 record and saved 11 games. After the 2009 season, Hawkins became a free agent.

=== Milwaukee Brewers (2010–2011) ===
On December 16, 2009, Hawkins signed a two-year contract with the Milwaukee Brewers for $7.5 million. Shoulder soreness prevented him from pitching for Milwaukee from May 6 through July 30, and after appearing in only five further games through August 10, he was placed back on the disabled list with shoulder weakness, never to pitch again that season. All told, the injuries limited him to 18 games in 2010. He was 0–3 with an 8.44 ERA.

Hawkins served as the eighth-inning setup man for John Axford in 2011. From April 25 through July 1, he did not allow a run in 22 straight games (20 innings pitched). He was 3–1 with a 2.42 ERA in 52 games as the Brewers won the NL Central. Facing the Arizona Diamondbacks in the NLDS, he pitched a scoreless inning in Game 2. The Brewers won that series in five games. In the NLCS against the Cardinals, he was not charged with a run in three appearances, but he did allow two inherited runners to score in Milwaukee's 12–6 loss in Game 6. The Cardinals defeated the Brewers in six games. After the season, he became a free agent.

=== Los Angeles Angels of Anaheim (2012) ===
On January 6, 2012, Hawkins agreed to a one-year, $3 million contract with the Los Angeles Angels for the 2012 season. From May 7 through June 9, he was on the disabled list with a broken right pinkie finger. He led Angel relievers with a 1.63 ERA through August 2 but posted a 7.71 ERA thereafter, losing the distinction to Ernesto Frieri by season's end. Frieri posted a 2.32 ERA, compared to Hawkins's 3.64. Hawkins appeared in 48 games, going 2–3. After the season, he became a free agent.

=== New York Mets (2013) ===
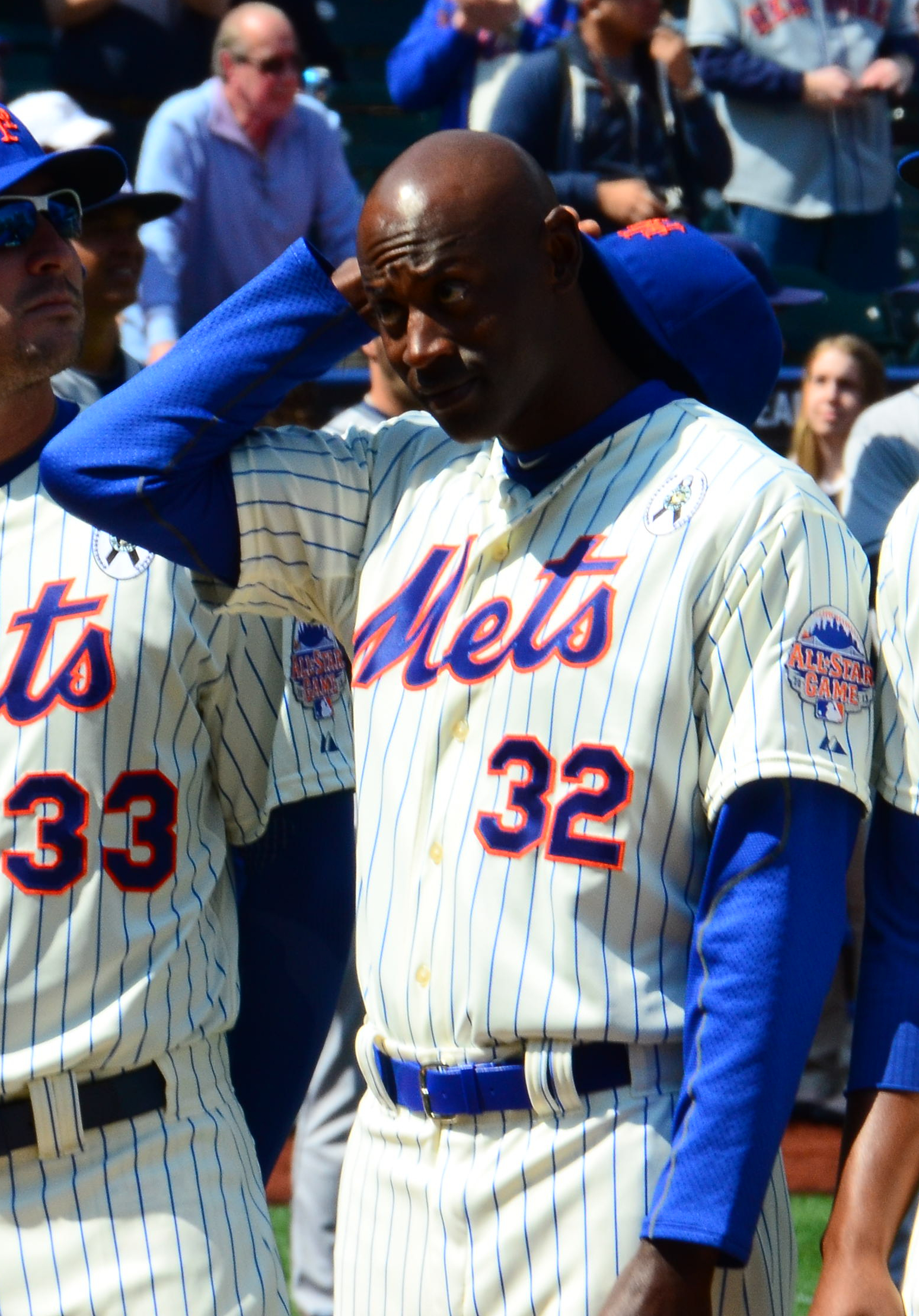
Hawkins with the New York Mets in 2013

Unable to get a major league contract in 2013, Hawkins signed a minor league deal with an invitation to spring training with the Mets on January 31. He considered retiring rather than accepting the minor league contract, but his agent told him to reconsider for 24 hours, and Hawkins decided ""Next time I leave this game, I'm gonna leave on my own terms." At the end of spring training, he earned a spot on the Mets roster. In August, he became the team's closer after Bobby Parnell was shut down for the season with a herniated disc in his back. After blowing a save against the Padres on August 14, he converted 10 straight save opportunities to end the year. Hawkins appeared in 72 games, amassing a 3–2 record and 13 saves (his most since the 2004 season with the Cubs) while posting a 2.93 ERA. After the season, he became a free agent.

=== Second stint with the Colorado Rockies (2014–2015) ===
In November 2013, Hawkins signed a one-year, $2.5 million contract to return to the Colorado Rockies. By 2014, the 41-year-old Hawkins was the oldest active player in the NL and the oldest active MLB pitcher.

Hawkins served as the Rockies' closer for the 2014 season. He converted his first 10 save opportunities of the year before blowing one on May 18 against the Padres. The streak of 20 (dating back to 2013) was his longest since he converted 23 straight saves from 2000 to 2001. He finished the year with a 3.31 ERA. On September 27, Hawkins made his 1,000th career appearance in a game against the Los Angeles Dodgers and promptly got Darwin Barney to fly out to right field. Though he converted only 23 saves, he only blew three opportunities and served as Colorado's closer for the entire season. Adam Ottavino was the only other Rockie to record a save in 2014; Colorado's 24 saves were the lowest total among the 15 NL teams.

On December 12, 2014, during an interview on MLB Network, Hawkins announced that 2015 would be his last MLB season. He opened 2015 as the closer but was removed from the role on April 13 after blowing saves in two of his first three appearances. From April 22 through June 15, he was on the disabled list with right biceps tendinitis. After posting a 2–1 record, two saves, and a 3.63 ERA in 24 games, he and teammate Troy Tulowitzki were traded to the Toronto Blue Jays for José Reyes, Jeff Hoffman, Miguel Castro, and Jesús Tinoco on July 28.

=== Toronto Blue Jays (2015) ===
On August 5, Hawkins became the 13th player in MLB history to record a save against all 30 teams, closing out a 9–7 win over the Minnesota Twins, the team he started his professional career with. He also surpassed Darren Oliver as the oldest Blue Jay to record a save. He finished the game against the Orioles on September 30 that clinched the AL East division championship, pitching an inning and striking out Ryan Flaherty to end the game and give Toronto its first AL East championship since 1993. Hawkins made 18 regular season appearances for the Blue Jays, pitching to a 1–0 record with a 2.76 ERA and 14 strikeouts in 16 1/3 innings.

In Game 2 of the ALDS, Hawkins entered the game at the beginning of the 14th inning, retiring the first two hitters for the Texas Rangers before allowing three straight singles. Two runners scored, and Hawkins took the loss in the 6–4 defeat. It was his only appearance of the series, but Toronto rallied from a 2–0 deficit to win the series in five games. He made two appearances in the ALCS but allowed five runs in one inning pitched as the Blue Jays were eliminated in five games by the Royals.

Through the 2020 season, his 1,042 games pitched were the 10th highest in all-time MLB history. Bob Nightengale of USA Today voted for Hawkins in the 2021 Baseball Hall of Fame balloting. In an article addressing critics of the vote, Nightengale explained that he was so distraught when Hal McRae, a player he greatly admired, failed to get any votes, that he vowed to cast his ballot for anyone else he greatly admired again, even if their statistics did not seem Hall-of-Fame worthy. "Really, Hawkins epitomizes the character clause for the Baseball Writers' Association of America," Nightengale pointed out. The clause reads, “Voting shall be based upon the player’s record, playing ability, integrity, sportsmanship, character and contribution to the team(s) on which the player played.” Though Nightengale was unaware of it at the time, Hawkins garnered a second Hall of Fame vote from someone else, but this was not enough for him to be eligible for future ballots.

== Coaching career ==
On November 7, 2025, the Minnesota Twins hired Hawkins to serve as the team's bullpen coach under new manager Derek Shelton.

== Pitching style ==
In a 1995 scouting report for the Chicago White Sox, Ed Pebley wrote that Hawkins had just an average fastball which traveled only 88 miles per hour (142 km/h)–91 miles per hour (146 km/h). He also threw a curveball, a slider, and a changeup, all of which travelled in the 70 miles per hour (110 km/h) range. However, his fastball velocity improved, averaging around 95 miles per hour (153 km/h) later in the decade. Eventual Hall of Famer Ken Griffey Jr. was so impressed with the pitch, he asked to see Hawkins once when the Seattle Mariners were playing the Twins at the Metrodome. Griffey asked Hawkins why, with a fastball as good as the one he had, he would ever bother throwing a slow changeup. "I learned a lot by him telling me that,” Hawkins said. “I used it to my advantage after that, that’s for sure.” Later in his career, he relied more on the slider and a split-finger fastball.

== Personal life ==
Hawkins and his wife, Anita, have two children, a son named Dakari and a daughter named Troi. They live in Prosper, Texas, a suburb of Dallas. Hawkins' half-brother, Ronald Sewood, was sentenced to prison in 1996 at the Federal Correctional Institution, Milan. Hawkins visited Sewood whenever he played against the nearby Detroit Tigers. As of 2013, Hawkins estimated he spent $10,000 on books and magazine subscriptions for Sewood. Hawkins is the godfather of his Minnesota Twins teammate Pat Mahomes' son, Patrick II who is a quarterback for the Kansas City Chiefs. Hawkins is also good friends with Torii Hunter, his teammate for several years with the Twins. Another godson of Hawkins's, Elijah Johnson, played college basketball for the University of Kansas Jayhawks.

After the 2016 season, Hawkins was hired as a special assistant to the Minnesota Twins organization. The team announced that he would, among other things, be "contributing to the development of our organizational pitching philosophies used in the selection and development of all players. Additionally, he will contribute to the amateur scouting process and trade deadline preparation meetings."

On a number of occasions, Hawkins has contributed to charitable efforts. After Hurricane Katrina, Hawkins went to Mississippi and Alabama, working in trailer park hospitals and helping with house rebuilding efforts as part of the Major League Baseball Players Association's relief efforts. He also offered financial help to a young mother with two children whose home had been ruined by the hurricane. Hawkins has given nearly $30,000 to Gary Youth Baseball, which runs the city's Little League teams. In January 2021, Hawkins and his wife paid for a woman who caught a home invasion on TikTok to move into an apartment with better security.

In May 2025, Hawkins graduated from Southern New Hampshire University with a Bachelor's Degree in Sociology.
