= 1998 Boston Red Sox season =

Major League Baseball season

1998 Boston Red Sox
- American League Wild Card winner
- League: American League
- Division: East
- Ballpark: Fenway Park
- City: Boston, Massachusetts
- Record: 92–70 (.568)
- Divisional place: 2nd
- Owners: JRY Trust
- President: John Harrington
- General manager: Dan Duquette
- Manager: Jimy Williams
- Television: WABU (Sean McDonough, Jerry Remy); NESN (Bob Kurtz, Jerry Remy)
- Radio: WEEI (Jerry Trupiano, Joe Castiglione); WRCA (Bobby Serrano, Hector Martinez)
- Stats: ESPN.com; Baseball Reference

The 1998 Boston Red Sox season was the 98th season in the franchise's Major League Baseball history. The Red Sox finished second in the American League East with a record of 92–70, twenty-two games behind the New York Yankees, who went on to win the 1998 World Series. The Red Sox qualified for the postseason as the AL wild card but lost to the American League Central champion Cleveland Indians in the ALDS. The Red Sox would start a winning record run, nonplayoff or playoff until 2012.

== Offseason ==
- November 6, 1997: Jim Leyritz was traded by the Texas Rangers with Damon Buford to the Boston Red Sox for Mark Brandenburg, Bill Haselman, and Aaron Sele.
- November 17, 1997: Bret Saberhagen was signed as a free agent with the Boston Red Sox.
- November 18, 1997: Pedro Martínez was traded by the Montreal Expos to the Boston Red Sox for a player to be named later and Carl Pavano. The Boston Red Sox sent Tony Armas (December 18, 1997) to the Montreal Expos to complete the trade.
- November 18, 1997: Jeff Suppan was selected by the Arizona Diamondbacks in the 1997 Major League Baseball expansion draft.
- November 18, 1997: Jim Mecir was selected by the Tampa Bay Devil Rays in the 1997 Major League Baseball expansion draft.
- November 21, 1997: Mike Benjamin was signed as a free agent with the Boston Red Sox.
- March 19, 1998: Midre Cummings was selected off waivers by the Boston Red Sox from the Cincinnati Reds.

== Regular season ==
=== Season standings ===
AL East
Team	W	L	Pct.	GB	Home	Road
New York Yankees	114	48	.704	—	62‍–‍19	52‍–‍29
Boston Red Sox	92	70	.568	22	51‍–‍30	41‍–‍40
Toronto Blue Jays	88	74	.543	26	51‍–‍30	37‍–‍44
Baltimore Orioles	79	83	.488	35	42‍–‍39	37‍–‍44
Tampa Bay Devil Rays	63	99	.389	51	33‍–‍48	30‍–‍51

=== Record vs. opponents ===
1998 American League record Source: MLB Standings Grid – 1998
Team	ANA	BAL	BOS	CWS	CLE	DET	KC	MIN	NYY	OAK	SEA	TB	TEX	TOR	NL
Anaheim	—	5–6	6–5	5–6	4–7	8–3	6–5	6–5	6–5	5–7	9–3	6–5	5–7	4–7	10–6
Baltimore	6–5	—	6–6	2–9	5–6	10–1	5–6	7–3	3–9	8–3	6–5	5–7	6–5	5–7	5–11
Boston	5–6	6–6	—	5–6	8–3	5–5	8–3	5–6	5–7	9–2	7–4	9–3	6–5	5–7	9–7
Chicago	6–5	9–2	6–5	—	6–6	6–6	8–4	6–6	4–7	4–7	4–7	5–6	5–6	4–6–1	7–9
Cleveland	7–4	6–5	3–8	6–6	—	9–3	8–4	6–6	4–7	3–8	9–2	7–3	4–7	7–4	10–6
Detroit	3–8	1–10	5–5	6–6	3–9	—	6–6	8–4	3–8	7–4	3–8	5–6	3–8	5–6	7–9
Kansas City	5–6	6–5	3–8	4–8	4–8	6–6	—	7–5	0–10	7–4	4–6	8–3	3–8	6–5	9–7
Minnesota	5–6	3–7	6–5	6–6	6–6	4–8	5–7	—	4–7	4–7	2–9	7–4	7–4	4–7	7–9
New York	5–6	9–3	7–5	7–4	7–4	8–3	10–0	7–4	—	8–3	8–3	11–1	8–3	6–6	13–3
Oakland	7–5	3–8	2–9	7–4	8–3	4–7	4–7	7–4	3–8	—	5–7	5–6	6–6	5–6	8–8
Seattle	3–9	5–6	4–7	7–4	2–9	8–3	6–4	9–2	3–8	7–5	—	6–5	5–7	4–7	7–9
Tampa Bay	5–6	7–5	3–9	6–5	3–7	6–5	3–8	4–7	1–11	6–5	5–6	—	4–7	5–7	5–11
Texas	7–5	5–6	5–6	6–5	7–4	8–3	8–3	4–7	3–8	6–6	7–5	7–4	—	7–4	8–8
Toronto	7–4	7–5	7–5	6–4–1	4–7	6–5	5–6	7–4	6–6	6–5	7–4	7–5	4–7	—	9–7

Red Sox vs. National League East
Team	ATL	FLA	MON	NYM	PHI
Boston	2–1	2–1	3–0	1–2	1–3

=== Notable transactions ===
- June 2, 1998: Mark Teixeira was drafted by the Boston Red Sox in the 9th round of the 1998 amateur draft, but did not sign.
- June 20, 1998: Jim Leyritz was traded by the Boston Red Sox with Ethan Faggett (minors) to the San Diego Padres for Carlos Reyes, Mandy Romero, and Darío Veras.
- July 30, 1998: Pete Munro and Jay Yennaco were traded to the Toronto Blue Jays for Mike Stanley.
- July 31, 1998: Greg Swindell was traded by the Minnesota Twins with Orlando Merced to the Boston Red Sox for John Barnes, Matt Kinney, and Joe Thomas (minors).
- August 6, 1998: Pete Schourek was purchased from the Houston Astros.

=== Opening Day lineup ===
5	Nomar Garciaparra	SS
13	John Valentin	3B
42	Mo Vaughn	1B
18	Reggie Jefferson	DH
25	Troy O'Leary	LF
10	Scott Hatteberg	C
20	Darren Lewis	CF
56	Darren Bragg	RF
52	Donnie Sadler	2B
45	Pedro Martínez	P

=== Roster ===
1998 Boston Red Sox
Roster
Pitchers: 33 Steve Avery; 59 Brian Barkley; 40 Robinson Checo; 61 Jin-ho Cho; 41 Jim Corsi; 43 Dennis Eckersley; 34 Rich Garcés; 36 Tom Gordon; 27 Butch Henry; 32 Derek Lowe; 57 Ron Mahay; 45 Pedro Martínez; 55 Carlos Reyes; 19 Brian Rose; 17 Bret Saberhagen; 51 Pete Schourek; 55 Brian Shouse; 37 Greg Swindell; 65 Carlos Valdez; 31 Darío Veras; 49 Tim Wakefield; 46 John Wasdin; 39 David West	Catchers: 10 Scott Hatteberg; 31 Jim Leyritz; 54 Mandy Romero; 47 Jason Varitek; Infielders: 28 Mike Benjamin; 5 Nomar Garciaparra; 18 Reggie Jefferson; 51 Keith Johns; 15 Mark Lemke; 50 Lou Merloni; 52 Donnie Sadler; 26 Chris Snopek; 20 Mike Stanley; 13 John Valentin; 42 Mo Vaughn	Outfielders: 23 Billy Ashley; 56 Darren Bragg; 2 Damon Buford; 29 Midre Cummings; 20 Darren Lewis; 26 Orlando Merced; 30 Keith Mitchell; 7 Trot Nixon; 25 Troy O'Leary	Manager: 22 Jimy Williams; Coaches: 48 Dave Jauss (First base); 16 Joe Kerrigan (Pitching); 12 Wendell Kim (Third base); 60 Dana LeVangie (Bullpen catcher); 35 Grady Little (Bench); 14 Jim Rice (Hitting); 38 Dick Pole (Bullpen)

== Player stats ==
=== Batting ===
==== Starters by position ====
Note: Pos = Position; G = Games played; AB = At bats; R = Runs; H = Hits; HR = Home runs; RBI = Runs batted in; Avg. = Batting average; Slg. = Slugging average; SB = Stolen bases

Pos	Player	G	AB	R	H	HR	RBI	Avg.	Slg.	SB
C	Scott Hatteberg	112	359	46	99	12	43	.276	.446	0
1B	Mo Vaughn	154	609	107	205	40	115	.337	.591	0
2B	Mike Benjamin	124	349	46	95	4	39	.272	.372	3
3B	John Valentin	153	588	113	145	23	73	.247	.442	4
SS	Nomar Garciaparra	143	604	111	195	35	122	.323	.584	12
LF	Troy O'Leary	156	611	95	165	23	83	.270	.468	2
CF	Darren Lewis	155	585	95	157	8	63	.268	.362	29
RF	Darren Bragg	129	409	51	114	8	57	.279	.423	5
DH	Damon Buford	86	216	37	61	10	42	.282	.523	5

==== Other batters ====
Note: G = Games played; AB = At bats; H = Hits; Avg. = Batting average; HR = Home runs; RBI = Runs batted in, SB = Stolen bases

Player	G	AB	H	Avg.	HR	RBI	SB
Jason Varitek	86	221	56	.253	7	33	2
Reggie Jefferson	62	196	60	.306	8	31	0
Mike Stanley	47	156	45	.288	7	32	1
Jim Leyritz	52	129	37	.287	8	24	0
Donnie Sadler	58	124	28	.226	3	15	4
Midre Cummings	67	120	34	.283	5	15	3
Lou Merloni	39	96	27	.281	1	15	1
Mark Lemke	31	91	17	.187	0	7	0
Keith Mitchell	23	33	9	.273	0	6	1
Trot Nixon	13	27	7	.259	0	0	0
Billy Ashley	13	24	7	.292	3	7	0
Mandy Romero	12	13	3	.231	0	1	0
Chris Snopek	8	12	2	.167	0	2	0
Orlando Merced	9	9	0	.000	0	2	0
Keith Johns	2	0	0	----	0	0	0

=== Pitching ===
==== Starting pitchers ====
Note: G = Games pitched; GS = Games started; IP = Innings pitched; W = Wins; L = Losses; ERA = Earned run average; SO = Strikeouts

Player	G	GS	IP	W	L	ERA	SO
Pedro Martínez	33	33	233.2	19	7	2.89	251
Tim Wakefield	36	33	216.0	17	8	4.58	146
Bret Saberhagen	31	31	175.0	15	8	3.96	100
Pete Schourek	10	8	44.0	1	3	4.30	36
Brian Rose	8	8	37.2	1	4	6.93	18
Jin-ho Cho	4	4	18.2	0	3	8.20	15
Butch Henry	2	2	9.0	0	0	4.00	6
Robinson Checo	2	2	7.2	0	2	9.39	5

==== Other pitchers ====
Note: G = Games pitched; GS = Games started; IP = Innings pitched; W = Wins; L = Losses; SV = Saves; ERA = Earned run average; SO = Strikeouts

Player	G	GS	IP	W	L	SV	ERA	SO
Steve Avery	34	23	123.2	10	7	0	5.02	57
Derek Lowe	63	10	123.0	3	9	4	4.02	77
John Wasdin	47	8	96.0	6	4	0	5.25	59

==== Relief pitchers ====
Note: G = Games pitched; GS = Games started; IP = Innings pitched; W = Wins; L = Losses; SV = Saves; ERA = Earned run average; SO = Strikeouts

Player	G	GS	IP	W	L	SV	ERA	SO
Tom Gordon	73	0	79.1	7	4	46	2.72	78
Jim Corsi	59	0	66.0	3	2	0	2.59	49
Dennis Eckersley	50	0	39.2	4	1	1	4.76	22
Rich Garcés	30	0	46.0	1	1	1	3.33	34
Ron Mahay	29	0	26.0	1	1	1	3.46	14
Greg Swindell	29	0	24.0	2	3	0	3.38	18
Carlos Reyes	24	0	38.1	1	1	0	3.52	23
Brian Shouse	7	0	8.0	0	1	0	5.63	5
Darío Veras	7	0	8.0	0	1	0	10.13	2
Brian Barkley	6	0	11.0	0	0	0	9.82	2
David West	6	0	2.0	0	0	0	27.00	4
Carlos Valdez	4	0	3.1	1	0	0	0.00	4

== ALDS ==
=== Game 1 ===
Team	1	2	3	4	5	6	7	8	9	R	H	E
Boston	3	0	0	0	3	2	0	3	0	11	12	0
Cleveland	0	0	0	0	0	2	1	0	0	3	6	0
W: Pedro Martínez (1–0) L: Jaret Wright (0–1)
HR: BOS: Mo Vaughn (2), Nomar Garciaparra; CLE: Kenny Lofton, Jim Thome

=== Game 2 ===
Team	1	2	3	4	5	6	7	8	9	R	H	E
Boston	2	0	1	0	0	2	0	0	0	5	10	0
Cleveland	1	5	1	0	0	1	0	1	0	9	9	1
W: Dave Burba (1–0) L: Tim Wakefield (0–1) S: Mike Jackson (1)
HR: CLE: David Justice

=== Game 3 ===
Team	1	2	3	4	5	6	7	8	9	R	H	E
Cleveland	0	0	0	0	1	1	1	0	1	4	5	0
Boston	0	0	0	1	0	0	0	0	2	3	6	0
W: Charles Nagy (1–0) L: Bret Saberhagen (0–1); S: Mike Jackson (2)
HR: CLE: Jim Thome, Kenny Lofton, Manny Ramírez (2); BOS – Nomar Garciaparra

=== Game 4 ===
Team	1	2	3	4	5	6	7	8	9	R	H	E
Cleveland	0	0	0	0	0	0	0	2	0	2	5	0
Boston	0	0	0	1	0	0	0	0	0	1	6	0
W: Steve Reed (1–0) L: Tom Gordon (0–1) S: Mike Jackson (3)
HR: BOS: Nomar Garciaparra

== Awards and honors ==
All-Star Game

- Tom Gordon, reserve P
- Pedro Martínez, reserve P
- Mo Vaughn, reserve 1B (did not attend)

== Game log ==
Red Sox Win	Red Sox Loss	Game postponed	Clinched Playoff Spot

1998 Boston Red Sox Season Game Log: 92–70 (Home: 51–30; Away: 41–40)
April: 18–8

#	Date	Opponent	Score	Win	Loss	Save	Stadium	Attendance	Record	Streak
1	April 1	@ Athletics	2–0	Martínez (1–0)	Candiotti (0–1)	Gordon (1)	Network Associates Coliseum	36,915	1–0	W1
2	April 2	@ Athletics	6–3	Wasdin (1–0)	Taylor (0–1)	Gordon (2)	Network Associates Coliseum	7,313	2–0	W2
3	April 3	@ Mariners	6–11	Cloude (1–0)	Lowe (0–1)	—	Kingdome	27,553	2–1	L1
4	April 4	@ Mariners	6–12	Swift (1–0)	Rose (0–1)	—	Kingdome	43,035	2–2	L2
5	April 5	@ Mariners	10–5	Saberhagen (1–0)	Johnson (0–1)	—	Kingdome	35,143	3–2	W1
6	April 6	@ Angels	1–2 (11)	Holtz (1–0)	Gordon (0–1)	—	Edison Field	21,352	3–3	L1
7	April 7	@ Angels	1–6	Hill (2–0)	Wakefield (0–1)	—	Edison Field	19,926	3–4	L2
8	April 8	@ Angels	1–2	McDowell (1–1)	Lowe (0–2)	Percival (2)	Edison Field	24,450	3–5	L3
9	April 10	Mariners	9–7	Garcés (1–0)	Timlin (0–1)	—	Fenway Park	32,805	4–5	W1
10	April 11	Mariners	5–0	Martínez (2–0)	Moyer (1–2)	—	Fenway Park	32,403	5–5	W2
11	April 12	Mariners	8–7	Wasdin (2–0)	Slocumb (0–1)	—	Fenway Park	23,270	6–5	W3
12	April 13	Athletics	6–3	Saberhagen (2–0)	Rogers (1–1)	Gordon (3)	Fenway Park	18,011	7–5	W4
13	April 14	Athletics	8–6	Gordon (1–1)	Taylor (0–2)	—	Fenway Park	18,490	8–5	W5
14	April 15	Athletics	4–3	Eckersley (1–0)	Mathews (0–2)	—	Fenway Park	18,477	9–5	W6
15	April 17	Indians	3–2 (10)	Gordon (2–1)	Assenmacher (1–2)	—	Fenway Park	26,924	10–5	W7
16	April 18	Indians	4–7	Martin (1–0)	Eckersley (1–1)	Jackson (7)	Fenway Park	31,735	10–6	L1
17	April 19	Indians	2–0	Saberhagen (3–0)	Burba (2–2)	Gordon (4)	Fenway Park	31,846	11–6	W1
18	April 20	Indians	6–5 (11)	Gordon (3–1)	Plunk (1–1)	—	Fenway Park	33,001	12–6	W2
19	April 21	@ Tigers	11–4	Rose (1–1)	Worrell (1–3)	—	Tiger Stadium	10,022	13–6	W3
20	April 22	@ Tigers	8–5	Corsi (1–0)	Jones (0–1)	Gordon (5)	Tiger Stadium	10,102	14–6	W4
21	April 24	@ Indians	7–5	Wakefield (1–1)	Burba (2–3)	Gordon (6)	Jacobs Field	40,570	15–6	W5
22	April 25	@ Indians	3–2	Saberhagen (4–0)	Colón (1–1)	Gordon (7)	Jacobs Field	40,571	16–6	W6
—	April 26	Tigers	Postponed (rain). Makeup date July 21.							
23	April 27	Tigers	6–5	Eckersley (2–1)	Runyan (0–2)	Gordon (8)	Fenway Park	18,456	17–6	W7
24	April 28	Tigers	5–7	Florie (2–0)	Shouse (0–1)	Jones (3)	Fenway Park	20,936	17–7	L1
25	April 29	Angels	8–4	Wakefield (2–1)	Watson (1–3)	Gordon (9)	Fenway Park	21,557	18–7	W1
26	April 30	Angels	2–7	Hill (5–1)	Checo (0–1)	—	Fenway Park	21,526	18–8	L1

May: 13–14

#	Date	Opponent	Score	Win	Loss	Save	Stadium	Attendance	Record	Streak
27	May 1	Rangers	5–3	Wasdin (3–0)	Sele (5–1)	Gordon (10)	Fenway Park	24,169	19–8	W2
28	May 2	Rangers	6–7	Helling (6–0)	Rose (1–2)	Wetteland (7)	Fenway Park	25,827	19–9	L1
29	May 3	Rangers	2–1	Martínez (3–0)	Oliver (1–4)	Gordon (11)	Fenway Park	28,075	20–9	W1
30	May 5	Twins	4–2	Wakefield (3–1)	Tewksbury (3–4)	Gordon (12)	Fenway Park	20,882	21–9	W2
31	May 6	Twins	7–8	Hawkins (1–3)	Checo (0–2)	—	Fenway Park	20,945	21–10	L1
32	May 7	@ Royals	3–5	Rapp (2–3)	Rose (1–3)	Montgomery (7)	Kauffman Stadium	14,703	21–11	L2
33	May 8	@ Royals	14–3	Saberhagen (5–0)	Haney (2–3)	Garcés (1)	Kauffman Stadium	24,439	22–11	W1
34	May 9	@ Royals	3–1	Martínez (4–0)	Belcher (1–5)	Gordon (13)	Kauffman Stadium	18,035	23–11	W2
35	May 10	@ Royals	3–1	Wakefield (4–1)	Rosado (0–2)	Gordon (14)	Kauffman Stadium	14,793	24–11	W3
36	May 11	@ Rangers	2–8	Witt (4–1)	Wasdin (3–1)	—	The Ballpark in Arlington	40,275	24–12	L1
37	May 12	@ Rangers	3–6	Sele (6–2)	Rose (1–4)	Wetteland (10)	The Ballpark in Arlington	39,614	24–13	L2
38	May 13	@ Twins	4–7	Radke (4–3)	Saberhagen (5–1)	Aguilera (7)	Metrodome	9,076	24–14	L3
39	May 14	@ Twins	1–2 (12)	Trombley (1–1)	Wasdin (3–2)	—	Metrodome	12,121	24–15	L4
40	May 15	Royals	5–2	Wakefield (5–1)	Rosado (0–3)	Eckersley (1)	Fenway Park	31,466	25–15	W1
41	May 16	Royals	5–0	Avery (1–0)	Walker (0–1)	Gordon (15)	Fenway Park	31,700	26–15	W2
42	May 17	Royals	5–3	Mahay (1–0)	Rusch (3–6)	Gordon (16)	Fenway Park	29,736	27–15	W3
43	May 19	White Sox	5–9	Bere (2–4)	Saberhagen (5–2)	—	Fenway Park	27,121	27–16	L1
44	May 20	White Sox	6–2	Martínez (5–0)	Navarro (4–4)	Gordon (17)	Fenway Park	26,953	28–16	W1
45	May 22	Yankees	5–4	Wakefield (6–1)	Nelson (1–1)	Gordon (18)	Fenway Park	33,605	29–16	W2
46	May 23	Yankees	3–12	Wells (6–1)	Lowe (0–3)	—	Fenway Park	33,120	29–17	L1
47	May 24	Yankees	4–14	Cone (6–1)	Saberhagen (5–3)	—	Fenway Park	33,042	29–18	L2
48	May 25	Blue Jays	5–7	Hentgen (7–3)	Martínez (5–1)	Myers (11)	Fenway Park	32,342	29–19	L3
49	May 26	Blue Jays	2–5	Guzmán (3–6)	Avery (1–1)	Myers (12)	Fenway Park	27,668	29–20	L4
50	May 28	@ Yankees	3–8	Wells (7–1)	Wakefield (6–2)	Stanton (5)	Yankee Stadium	42,182	29–21	L5
51	May 29	@ Yankees	2–6	Cone (7–1)	Lowe (0–4)	—	Yankee Stadium	47,160	29–22	L6
52	May 30	@ Yankees	3–2	Saberhagen (6–3)	Irabu (4–1)	Gordon (19)	Yankee Stadium	55,191	30–22	W1
53	May 31	@ Yankees	13–7	Martínez (6–1)	Pettitte (6–5)	—	Yankee Stadium	55,711	31–22	W2

June: 17–10

#	Date	Opponent	Score	Win	Loss	Save	Stadium	Attendance	Record	Streak
54	June 1	@ Blue Jays	9–5	Corsi (2–1)	Myers (2–1)	—	Skydome	27,372	32–22	W3
55	June 2	@ Blue Jays	11–3	Avery (2–1)	Carpenter (1–2)	—	Skydome	26,177	33–22	W4
56	June 3	Orioles	0–3	Johns (2–1)	Lowe (0–5)	Rhodes (2)	Fenway Park	31,355	33–23	L1
57	June 4	Orioles	9–1	Saberhagen (7–3)	Ponson (0–3)	—	Fenway Park	33,104	34–23	W1
58	June 5	Mets	2–9	Leiter (6–3)	Martínez (6–2)	—	Fenway Park	32,214	34–24	L1
59	June 6	Mets	0–1	Jones (5–3)	Wakefield (6–3)	Franco (13)	Fenway Park	32,525	34–25	L2
60	June 7	Mets	5–0	Avery (3–1)	Yoshii (4–2)	—	Fenway Park	30,630	35–25	W1
61	June 8	@ Braves	6–7	Embree (1–0)	Wasdin (3–3)	—	Turner Field	44,018	35–26	L1
62	June 9	@ Braves	9–3	Saberhagen (8–3)	Martínez (2–3)	—	Turner Field	43,121	36–26	W1
63	June 10	@ Braves	10–6	Martínez (7–2)	Neagle (7–4)	—	Turner Field	41,345	37–26	W2
64	June 12	Devil Rays	5–1	Wakefield (7–3)	Arrojo (8–4)	—	Fenway Park	31,994	38–26	W3
—	June 13	Devil Rays	Postponed (rain). Makeup date September 21.							
65	June 14	Devil Rays	3–2 (10)	Gordon (4–1)	Lopez (2–2)	—	Fenway Park	27,768	39–26	W4
66	June 15	@ White Sox	2–3	Parque (2–0)	Saberhagen (8–4)	Karchner (8)	Comiskey Park	16,103	39–27	L1
67	June 16	@ White Sox	6–1	Martínez (8–2)	Bere (3–6)	—	Comiskey Park	13,483	40–27	W1
68	June 17	@ White Sox	12–5	Wakefield (8–3)	Eyre (1–7)	Gordon (20)	Comiskey Park	13,563	41–27	W1
69	June 18	@ Devil Rays	7–5 (10)	Wasdin (4–3)	Yan (4–1)	Gordon (21)	Tropicana Field	30,177	42–27	W2
70	June 19	@ Devil Rays	4–1	Avery (4–1)	Saunders (1–7)	Gordon (22)	Tropicana Field	32,375	43–27	W3
71	June 20	@ Devil Rays	5–8	Santana (2–0)	Saberhagen (8–5)	Hernández (15)	Tropicana Field	41,169	43–28	L1
72	June 21	@ Devil Rays	3–1	Martínez (9–2)	Johnson (2–4)	Gordon (23)	Tropicana Field	40,348	44–28	W1
73	June 22	Phillies	8–9 (10)	Gomes (6–2)	Gordon (4–2)	Leiter (14)	Fenway Park	33,592	44–29	L1
74	June 23	Phillies	2–3	Portugal (3–2)	Lowe (0–6)	—	Fenway Park	33,212	44–30	L2
75	June 24	Phillies	8–11	Loewer (2–0)	Avery (4–2)	Leiter (15)	Fenway Park	28,079	44–31	L3
76	June 25	Phillies	7–5	Saberhagen (9–5)	Beech (3–5)	Mahay (1)	Fenway Park	28,263	45–31	W1
77	June 26	@ Marlins	6–1	Martínez (10–2)	Fontenot (0–6)	—	Pro Player Stadium	23,792	46–31	W2
78	June 27	@ Marlins	9–4	Wakefield (9–3)	Sánchez (3–5)	—	Pro Player Stadium	31,212	47–31	W3
79	June 28	@ Marlins	1–5	Dempster (1–3)	Lowe (0–7)	Alfonseca (3)	Pro Player Stadium	28,418	47–32	L1
80	June 30	Expos	7–4	Avery (5–2)	Pérez (6–8)	Gordon (24)	Fenway Park	27,704	48–32	W1

July: 15–12

#	Date	Opponent	Score	Win	Loss	Save	Stadium	Attendance	Record	Streak
81	July 1	Expos	6–1	Saberhagen (10–5)	Hermanson (6–7)	—	Fenway Park	24,923	49–32	W2
82	July 2	Expos	15–0	Martínez (11–2)	Pavano (2–2)	—	Fenway Park	32,637	50–32	W3
83	July 3	White Sox	15–2	Wakefield (10–3)	Sirotka (8–8)	—	Fenway Park	32,467	51–32	W4
84	July 4	White Sox	0–3	Snyder (1–0)	Cho (0–1)	Simas (5)	Fenway Park	29,600	51–33	L1
85	July 5	White Sox	15–14	Reyes (3–2)	Howry (0–1)	Gordon (25)	Fenway Park	32,970	52–33	W1
86	July 9	@ Orioles	2–3	Orosco (2–1)	Corsi (2–1)	Benítez (10)	Camden Yards	48,014	52–34	L1
87	July 10	@ Orioles	2–3	Orosco (3–1)	Martínez (11–3)	Benítez (11)	Camden Yards	48,043	52–35	L2
88	July 11	@ Orioles	1–2	Erickson (9–7)	Wakefield (10–4)	Orosco (6)	Camden Yards	48,244	52–36	L3
89	July 12	@ Orioles	7–11	Johns (3–2)	Cho (0–2)	Mills (1)	Camden Yards	48,193	52–37	L4
90	July 13	@ Devil Rays	2–0	Avery (6–2)	Santana (2–2)	Gordon (26)	Tropicana Field	29,186	53–37	W1
91	July 14	@ Devil Rays	4–5	Lopez (5–2)	Mahay (1–1)	—	Tropicana Field	27,310	53–38	L1
92	July 15	Indians	1–0	Martínez (12–3)	Colón (9–5)	—	Fenway Park	33,501	54–38	W1
93	July 16	Indians	15–5	Wakefield (11–4)	Gooden (3–4)	Lowe (1)	Fenway Park	33,568	55–38	W2
94	July 17	@ Tigers	4–6	Powell (1–1)	Cho (0–3)	Jones (17)	Tiger Stadium	26,255	55–39	L1
95	July 18	@ Tigers	9–4	Avery (7–2)	Castillo (2–6)	Lowe (2)	Tiger Stadium	22,983	56–39	W1
96	July 19	@ Tigers	7–10	Thompson (9–8)	Gordon (4–3)	—	Tiger Stadium	21,018	56–40	L1
97	July 21 (1)	@ Indians	10–7	Martínez (13–3)	Gooden (3–5)	Gordon (27)	Jacobs Field	42,874	57–40	W1
98	July 21 (2)	@ Indians	2–4 (8)	Ogea (3–2)	Wakefield (11–5)	Jackson (23)	Jacobs Field	43,227	57–41	L1
99	July 22	@ Indians	3–4	Nagy (8–6)	Garcés (1–1)	Jackson (24)	Jacobs Field	43,073	57–42	L2
100	July 23	Blue Jays	8–7 (10)	Gordon (5–3)	Myers (3–3)	—	Fenway Park	33,011	58–42	W1
101	July 24	Blue Jays	6–10	Guzmán (5–12)	Avery (7–3)	Quantrill (2)	Fenway Park	33,159	58–43	L1
102	July 25	Blue Jays	5–3	Lowe (1–7)	Williams (9–5)	Gordon (28)	Fenway Park	33,099	59–43	W1
103	July 26	Blue Jays	6–3	Martínez (14–3)	Hentgen (9–8)	—	Fenway Park	33,059	60–43	W2
104	July 28	@ Athletics	8–4	Wakefield (12–5)	Haynes (7–4)	Gordon (29)	Network Associates Coliseum	11,208	61–43	W3
105	July 29	@ Athletics	10–2	Wasdin (5–3)	Oquist (6–8)	Lowe (3)	Network Associates Coliseum	11,632	62–43	W4
106	July 30	@ Athletics	5–6	Rogers (11–4)	Avery (7–4)	Taylor (22)	Network Associates Coliseum	17,535	62–44	L1
107	July 31	@ Angels	7–2	Saberhagen (11–5)	Olivares (5–8)	Gordon (30)	Edison Field	43,390	63–44	W1

August: 17–11

#	Date	Opponent	Score	Win	Loss	Save	Stadium	Attendance	Record	Streak
108	August 1	@ Angels	11–3	Martínez (15–3)	Watson (4–7)	Lowe (4)	Edison Field	29,893	64–44	W2
109	August 2	@ Angels	8–7	Wakefield (13–5)	Dickson (9–9)	Gordon (31)	Edison Field	35,763	65–44	W3
110	August 3	@ Mariners	1–3	Cloude (6–7)	Wasdin (5–4)	Timlin (7)	Kingdome	27,887	65–45	L1
111	August 4	@ Mariners	2–1	Avery (8–4)	McCarthy (0–2)	Gordon (32)	Kingdome	29,621	66–45	W1
112	August 6	@ Rangers	7–4	Burkett (7–11)	Saberhagen (11–6)	Wetteland (30)	The Ballpark at Arlington	32,132	66–46	L1
113	August 7	@ Rangers	3–4	Helling (15–6)	Martínez (15–4)	Wetteland (31)	The Ballpark at Arlington	34,906	66–47	L2
114	August 8	@ Rangers	11–1	Wakefield (14–5)	Sele (13–9)	—	The Ballpark at Arlington	44,242	67–47	W1
115	August 9	@ Rangers	14–8	Corsi (3–1)	Stottlemyre (10–10)	—	The Ballpark at Arlington	31,127	68–47	W2
116	August 11	Royals	4–7 (10)	Gordon (6–3)	Montgomery (1–4)	—	Fenway Park	32,290	69–47	W3
117	August 12	Royals	4–8	Service (5–3)	Swindell (3–4)	—	Fenway Park	32,488	69–48	L1
118	August 13	Twins	8–7	Eckersley (3–1)	Miller (0–2)	Gordon (33)	Fenway Park	32,801	70–48	W1
119	August 14	Twins	13–12	Lowe (2–7)	Baptist (0–1)	Gordon (34)	Fenway Park	32,888	71–48	W2
120	August 15	Twins	2–3	Rodriguez (2–2)	Schourek (7–7)	Aguilera (29)	Fenway Park	32,412	71–49	L1
121	August 16	Twins	3–6	Milton (7–9)	Avery (8–5)	Aguilera (30)	Fenway Park	30,893	71–50	L2
—	August 17	Rangers	Postponed (rain). Makeup date August 18.							
122	August 18 (1)	Rangers	4–1	Martínez (16–4)	Burkett (7–13)	Gordon (35)	Fenway Park	33,201	72–50	W1
123	August 18 (2)	Rangers	5–4	Lowe (3–7)	Patterson (1–5)	Gordon (36)	Fenway Park	26,677	73–50	W2
124	August 19	@ Royals	11–1	Wakefield (15–5)	Barber (0–1)	—	Kauffman Stadium	14,017	74–50	W3
125	August 20	@ Royals	2–8	Pichardo (7–8)	Schourek (7–8)	—	Kauffman Stadium	14,278	74–51	L1
126	August 21	@ Twins	9–2	Avery (9–5)	Milton (7–10)	—	Metrodome	16,786	75–51	W1
127	August 22	@ Twins	3–4	Trombley (4–3)	Swindell (3–5)	—	Metrodome	18,415	75–52	L1
128	August 23	@ Twins	5–1	Martínez (17–4)	Radke (10–12)	—	Metrodome	12,686	76–52	W1
129	August 25	Athletics	3–2	Swindell (4–5)	Rogers (12–6)	Gordon (37)	Fenway Park	28,366	77–52	W2
130	August 26	Athletics	7–4	Wasdin (6–4)	Worrell (2–7)	Gordon (38)	Fenway Park	26,379	78–52	W3
131	August 27	Athletics	3–6	Candiotti (10–14)	Schourek (7–9)	Taylor (27)	Fenway Park	31,239	78–53	L1
132	August 28	Angels	6–7	Hill (9–5)	Avery (9–6)	—	Fenway Park	32,470	78–54	L2
133	August 29	Angels	6–1	Martínez (18–4)	McDowell (3–3)	—	Fenway Park	32,519	79–54	W1
134	August 30	Angels	6–8	Hasegawa (7–3)	Wakefield (15–6)	Percival (38)	Fenway Park	31,476	79–55	L1
135	August 31	Mariners	5–1	Saberhagen (12–6)	Fassero (10–11)	—	Fenway Park	28,553	80–55	W1

September: 12–15

#	Date	Opponent	Score	Win	Loss	Save	Stadium	Attendance	Record	Streak
136	September 1	Mariners	3–7	Moyer (12–8)	Lowe (3–8)	—	Fenway Park	28,150	80–56	L1
137	September 2	Mariners	7–3	Gordon (7–3)	Ayala (1–10)	—	Fenway Park	25,813	81–56	W1
138	September 3	@ Blue Jays	3–4 (11)	Person (3–0)	Veras (0–1)	—	SkyDome	27,226	81–57	L1
139	September 4	@ Blue Jays	1–12	Hentgen (12–10)	Wakefield (15–7)	Steib (2)	SkyDome	29,166	81–58	L2
140	September 5	@ Blue Jays	3–4	Clemens (18–6)	Saberhagen (12–7)	Quantrill (7)	SkyDome	37,158	81–59	L3
141	September 6	@ Blue Jays	7–8	Quantrill (3–4)	Lowe (3–9)	Person (1)	SkyDome	38,374	81–60	L4
142	September 7	Yankees	4–3	Swindell (5–5)	Wells (17–3)	Gordon (39)	Fenway Park	32,106	82–60	W1
143	September 8	Yankees	2–3	Cone (19–5)	Martínez (18–5)	Rivera (34)	Fenway Park	33,409	82–61	L1
144	September 9	Yankees	5–7	Mendoza (9–2)	Wakefield (15–8)	Rivera (35)	Fenway Park	32,942	82–62	L2
145	September 11	Tigers	6–2	Saberhagen (13–7)	Powell (3–7)	Gordon (40)	Fenway Park	29,131	83–62	W1
146	September 12	Tigers	2–3	Anderson (4–1)	Gordon (7–4)	Jones (24)	Fenway Park	31,220	83–63	L1
147	September 13	Tigers	1–4	Moehler (13–13)	Swindell (5–6)	Jones (25)	Fenway Park	31,225	83–64	L2
148	September 14	@ Yankees	0–3	Hernández (10–4)	Martínez (18–6)	—	Yankee Stadium	42,725	83–65	L3
149	September 15	@ Yankees	9–4	Wakefield (16–8)	Jerzembeck (0–1)	—	Yankee Stadium	43,218	84–65	W1
150	September 16	@ Orioles	4–3	Saberhagen (14–7)	Erickson (15–12)	Gordon (41)	Camden Yards	42,676	85–65	W2
151	September 17	@ Orioles	3–2	Eckersley (4–1)	Benítez (5–6)	Gordon (42)	Camden Yards	44,565	86–65	W3
152	September 18	@ White Sox	9–11	Parque (7–5)	Avery (9–7)	Simas (18)	Comiskey Park	17,767	86–66	L1
153	September 19	@ White Sox	2–5	Snyder (7–2)	Martínez (18–7)	—	Comiskey Park	21,924	86–67	L2
154	September 20	@ White Sox	4–6	Sirotka (13–15)	Corsi (3–2)	Ward (1)	Comiskey Park	24,165	86–68	L3
155	September 21 (1)	Devil Rays	4–3	Saberhagen (15–7)	Saunders (6–15)	Gordon (43)	Fenway Park	—	87–68	W1
156	September 21 (2)	Devil Rays	4–8	Wade (1–0)	Reyes (3–3)	—	Fenway Park	23,379	87–69	L1
157	September 22	Devil Rays	11–2	Schourek (8–9)	Santana (5–6)	—	Fenway Park	20,339	88–69	W1
158	September 23	Devil Rays	5–4	Avery (10–7)	Rekar (2–8)	Gordon (44)	Fenway Park	23,240	89–69	W2
159	September 24	Orioles	9–6	Martínez (19–7)	Ponson (8–9)	Gordon (45)	Fenway Park	30,997	90–69	W3
160	September 25	Orioles	8–3	Wakefield (17–8)	Fussell (0–1)	—	Fenway Park	32,644	91–69	W4
161	September 26	Orioles	2–5	Erickson (16–13)	Saberhagen (15–8)	Benítez (22)	Fenway Park	29,226	91–70	L1
162	September 27	Orioles	6–4	Valdez (1–0)	Mussina (13–10)	Gordon (46)	Fenway Park	32,158	92–70	W1

=== Postseason game log ===
Boston Red Sox 1998 Postseason Game Log (1–3)
American League Division Series vs. Cleveland Indians (1–3)

#/	Date	Opponent	Score	Win	Loss	Save	Stadium	Attendance	Series	Streak
1	September 29	@ Indians	11–3	Martínez (1–0)	Wright (0–1)	—	Jacobs Field	45,185	1–0	W1
2	September 30	@ Indians	5–9	Burba (1–0)	Wakefield (0–1)	Jackson (1)	Jacobs Field	45,229	1–1	L1
3	October 2	Indians	3–4	Nagy (1–0)	Saberhagen (0–1)	Jackson (2)	Fenway Park	33,114	1–2	L2
4	October 3	Indians	1–2	Reed (1–0)	Gordon (0–1)	Jackson (3)	Fenway Park	33,537	1–3	L3
Red Sox Lose Series 1–3

== Farm system ==
Level	Team	League	Manager
AAA	Pawtucket Red Sox	International League	Ken Macha
AA	Trenton Thunder	Eastern League	DeMarlo Hale
A-Advanced	Sarasota Red Sox	Florida State League	Bob Geren
A	Michigan Battle Cats	Midwest League	Billy Gardner Jr.
A-Short Season	Lowell Spinners	New York–Penn League	Dick Berardino
Rookie	GCL Red Sox	Gulf Coast League	Luis Aguayo
Rookie	DSL Red Sox	Dominican Summer League	Nelson Norman
