= 1998 Detroit Tigers season =

Major League Baseball season

1998 Detroit Tigers
- League: American League
- Division: Central
- Ballpark: Tiger Stadium
- City: Detroit, Michigan
- Record: 65–97 (.401)
- Divisional place: 5th
- Owners: Mike Ilitch
- General managers: Randy Smith
- Managers: Buddy Bell, Larry Parrish
- Television: WKBD (Ernie Harwell, Al Kaline); FSN Detroit (Kirk Gibson, Josh Lewin)
- Radio: WJR (Frank Beckmann, Lary Sorensen, Jim Price)

The 1998 Detroit Tigers season was the team's 98th season and the 87th season at Tiger Stadium. The Tigers finished in fifth place in their first season in the American League Central with a record of 65–97 (.401), 24 games behind the Cleveland Indians. The Tigers were outscored by their opponents 863 to 722. The Tigers drew 1,409,391 fans to Tiger Stadium in 1998, ranking 11th of the 14 teams in the American League. The Tigers were the first team to lose to the Tampa Bay Devil Rays when they lost 11-8 in their second game of the season. They ultimately lost 2 of 3 games in the series, resulting in the first series win for the Devil Rays as well.

The Tigers missed the playoffs for the 11th straight season, tying a record set between 1973 and 1983. It was also the team's fifth consecutive losing season. Both streaks would last until 2006.

== Offseason ==
- November 11, 1997: Melvin Nieves was traded by the Detroit Tigers to the Cincinnati Reds for Paul Bako and Donne Wall.
- November 18, 1997: Travis Fryman was traded by the Detroit Tigers to the Arizona Diamondbacks for Gabe Alvarez, Joe Randa, and Matt Drews (minors).
- December 16, 1997: Billy Ripken was signed as a free agent with the Detroit Tigers.
- December 22, 1997: Joe Oliver was signed as a free agent with the Detroit Tigers.
- March 25, 1998: Doug Bochtler was purchased by the Detroit Tigers from the Oakland Athletics.

== Regular season ==
=== Season standings ===
AL Central
Team	W	L	Pct.	GB	Home	Road
Cleveland Indians	89	73	.549	—	46‍–‍35	43‍–‍38
Chicago White Sox	80	82	.494	9	44‍–‍37	36‍–‍45
Kansas City Royals	72	89	.447	16½	29‍–‍51	43‍–‍38
Minnesota Twins	70	92	.432	19	35‍–‍46	35‍–‍46
Detroit Tigers	65	97	.401	24	32‍–‍49	33‍–‍48

=== Record vs. opponents ===
1998 American League record Source: MLB Standings Grid – 1998
Team	ANA	BAL	BOS	CWS	CLE	DET	KC	MIN	NYY	OAK	SEA	TB	TEX	TOR	NL
Anaheim	—	5–6	6–5	5–6	4–7	8–3	6–5	6–5	6–5	5–7	9–3	6–5	5–7	4–7	10–6
Baltimore	6–5	—	6–6	2–9	5–6	10–1	5–6	7–3	3–9	8–3	6–5	5–7	6–5	5–7	5–11
Boston	5–6	6–6	—	5–6	8–3	5–5	8–3	5–6	5–7	9–2	7–4	9–3	6–5	5–7	9–7
Chicago	6–5	9–2	6–5	—	6–6	6–6	8–4	6–6	4–7	4–7	4–7	5–6	5–6	4–6–1	7–9
Cleveland	7–4	6–5	3–8	6–6	—	9–3	8–4	6–6	4–7	3–8	9–2	7–3	4–7	7–4	10–6
Detroit	3–8	1–10	5–5	6–6	3–9	—	6–6	8–4	3–8	7–4	3–8	5–6	3–8	5–6	7–9
Kansas City	5–6	6–5	3–8	4–8	4–8	6–6	—	7–5	0–10	7–4	4–6	8–3	3–8	6–5	9–7
Minnesota	5–6	3–7	6–5	6–6	6–6	4–8	5–7	—	4–7	4–7	2–9	7–4	7–4	4–7	7–9
New York	5–6	9–3	7–5	7–4	7–4	8–3	10–0	7–4	—	8–3	8–3	11–1	8–3	6–6	13–3
Oakland	7–5	3–8	2–9	7–4	8–3	4–7	4–7	7–4	3–8	—	5–7	5–6	6–6	5–6	8–8
Seattle	3–9	5–6	4–7	7–4	2–9	8–3	6–4	9–2	3–8	7–5	—	6–5	5–7	4–7	7–9
Tampa Bay	5–6	7–5	3–9	6–5	3–7	6–5	3–8	4–7	1–11	6–5	5–6	—	4–7	5–7	5–11
Texas	7–5	5–6	5–6	6–5	7–4	8–3	8–3	4–7	3–8	6–6	7–5	7–4	—	7–4	8–8
Toronto	7–4	7–5	7–5	6–4–1	4–7	6–5	5–6	7–4	6–6	6–5	7–4	7–5	4–7	—	9–7

=== Transactions ===
- July 16, 1998: Joe Oliver was released by the Detroit Tigers.
- July 20, 1998: Billy Ripken was released by the Detroit Tigers.

=== Roster ===
1998 Detroit Tigers
Roster
Pitchers: 14,51 Matt Anderson; 45 Doug Bochtler; 26 Doug Brocail; 58 Will Brunson; 46 Frank Castillo; 56 Dean Crow; 55 Roberto Durán; 39 Bryce Florie; 50 Seth Greisinger; 41 Denny Harriger; 59 Todd Jones; 57 Greg Keagle; 38 Brian Moehler; 36 Brian Powell; 44 Sean Runyan; 49 A. J. Sager; 27 Scott Sanders; 52 Marino Santana; 22 Justin Thompson; 36 Tim Worrell	Catchers: 32 Paul Bako; 33 Raul Casanova; 41 Robert Fick; 7 Joe Oliver; 30 Joe Siddall; Infielders: 20 Gabe Alvarez; 29,27 Frank Catalanotto; 17 Tony Clark; 8 Deivi Cruz; 9 Damion Easley; 20 Jeff Manto; 19 Joe Randa; 14 Billy Ripken; 43 Jason Wood	Outfielders: 12 Kimera Bartee; 37 Trey Beamon; 29 Gerónimo Berroa; 34 Juan Encarnación; 28 Luis Gonzalez; 4 Bobby Higginson; 20 Pete Incaviglia; 21 Brian Hunter; 51 Gabe Kapler; 10 Bip Roberts; 30 Andy Tomberlin	Manager: 25 Buddy Bell; 15 Larry Parrish; Coaches: 35 Rick Adair (Pitching); 31 Larry Herndon (Hitting); 13 Perry Hill (Third Base); 18 Fred Kendall (Bullpen); 15 Larry Parrish (Bench); 48 Jerry White (First Base)

== Player stats ==
= Indicates team leader

=== Batting ===
Note: G = Games played; AB = At bats; H = Hits; Avg. = Batting average; HR = Home runs; RBI = Runs batted in

Player	G	AB	H	Avg.	HR	RBI
Bobby Higginson	157	612	174	.284	25	85
Tony Clark	157	602	175	.291	34	103
Brian L. Hunter	142	595	151	.254	4	36
Damion Easley	153	594	161	.271	27	100
Joe Randa	138	560	117	.254	9	50
Luis Gonzalez	154	547	146	.267	23	71
Deivi Cruz	135	518	118	.260	5	45
Paul Bako	96	305	83	.272	3	30
Gabe Alvarez	58	286	46	.231	5	29
Frank Catalanotto	89	213	60	.282	6	25
Gerónimo Berroa	52	126	30	.238	1	10
Juan Encarnación	40	164	54	.329	7	21
Joe Oliver	50	155	35	.226	4	22
Bip Roberts	34	113	28	.248	0	9
Kimera Bartee	57	98	19	.194	3	15
Billy Ripken	27	74	20	.270	0	5
Andy Tomberlin	32	69	15	.217	2	12
Joe Siddall	29	65	12	.185	1	6
Trey Beamon	28	42	11	.262	0	2
Raul Casanova	16	42	6	.143	1	3
Jeff Manto	16	30	8	.267	1	3
Gabe Kapler	7	25	5	.200	0	0
Jason Wood	10	23	8	.348	1	1
Robert Fick	7	22	8	.364	3	7
Pete Incaviglia	7	14	1	.071	0	0
Pitcher Totals	162	21	3	.143	0	1
Team Totals	162	5664	1494	.264	165	691

Note: Individual pitchers' batting statistics not included

=== Starting pitchers ===
Note: G = Games pitched; IP = Innings pitched; W = Wins; L = Losses; ERA = Earned run average; SO = Strikeouts

Player	G	IP	W	L	ERA	SO
Justin Thompson	34	222.0	11	15	4.05	149
Seth Greisinger	33	221.1	14	13	3.90	123
Brian Moehler	21	130.0	6	9	5.12	66
Frank Castillo	27	116.0	3	9	6.83	81
Brian Powell	18	83.2	3	8	6.35	46

=== Relief and other pitchers ===
Note: G = Games pitched; IP = Innings pitched; W = Wins; L = Losses; SV = Saves; ERA = Earned run average; SO = Strikeouts

Player	G	IP	W	L	SV	ERA	SO
Bryce Florie	42	133.0	8	9	0	4.80	97
Doug Bochtler	51	67.1	0	2	0	6.15	45
Todd Jones	65	63.1	1	4	28	4.97	57
Doug Brocail	60	62.2	5	2	0	2.73	55
Tim Worrell	15	61.2	2	6	0	5.98	47
A. J. Sager	31	59.1	4	2	2	6.52	23
Sean Runyan	88	50.1	1	4	1	3.58	39
Dean Crow	32	45.2	2	2	0	3.94	18
Matt Anderson	42	44.0	5	1	0	3.27	44
Greg Keagle	9	31.2	0	5	0	5.59	25
Roberto Durán	18	15.1	0	1	0	5.87	12
Denny Harriger	4	12.0	0	3	0	6.75	3
Scott Sanders	3	9.2	0	2	0	17.69	6
Marino Santana	7	7.1	0	0	0	3.68	10
Will Brunson	8	3.0	0	0	0	0.00	1
Team Pitching Totals	162	1446.1	65	97	32	4.93	947

== Farm system ==
Level	Team	League	Manager
AAA	Toledo Mud Hens	International League	Gene Roof
AA	Jacksonville Suns	Southern League	Dave Anderson
A	Lakeland Tigers	Florida State League	Mark Meleski
A	West Michigan Whitecaps	Midwest League	Bruce Fields
A-Short Season	Jamestown Jammers	New York–Penn League	Tim Torricelli
Rookie	GCL Tigers	Gulf Coast League	Kevin Bradshaw

LEAGUE CHAMPIONS: West Michigan
