= 1998 Chicago White Sox season =

1998 Chicago White Sox
- League: American League
- Division: Central
- Ballpark: Comiskey Park
- City: Chicago
- Owners: Jerry Reinsdorf
- General managers: Ron Schueler
- Managers: Jerry Manuel
- Television: WGN-TV; Fox Sports Chicago (Ken Harrelson, Tom Paciorek)
- Radio: WMVP (John Rooney, Ed Farmer); WIND (AM) (Hector Molina)

The 1998 Chicago White Sox season was the White Sox's 99th season. They finished with a record of 80–82, good enough for second place in the American League Central, 9 games behind the first place Cleveland Indians.

== Offseason ==
- December 10, 1997: Charlie O'Brien was signed as a free agent with the Chicago White Sox.
- January 27, 1998: Howard Battle was signed as a free agent with the Chicago White Sox.

== Regular season ==
=== Opening Day lineup ===
- Ray Durham, 2B
- Mike Cameron, CF
- Frank Thomas, DH
- Albert Belle, LF
- Robin Ventura, 3B
- Magglio Ordóñez, RF
- Greg Norton, 1B
- Charlie O'Brien, C
- Mike Caruso, SS
- Jaime Navarro, P

=== Season standings ===
AL Central
Team	W	L	Pct.	GB	Home	Road
Cleveland Indians	89	73	.549	—	46‍–‍35	43‍–‍38
Chicago White Sox	80	82	.494	9	44‍–‍37	36‍–‍45
Kansas City Royals	72	89	.447	16½	29‍–‍51	43‍–‍38
Minnesota Twins	70	92	.432	19	35‍–‍46	35‍–‍46
Detroit Tigers	65	97	.401	24	32‍–‍49	33‍–‍48

=== Record vs. opponents ===
1998 American League record Source: MLB Standings Grid – 1998
Team	ANA	BAL	BOS	CWS	CLE	DET	KC	MIN	NYY	OAK	SEA	TB	TEX	TOR	NL
Anaheim	—	5–6	6–5	5–6	4–7	8–3	6–5	6–5	6–5	5–7	9–3	6–5	5–7	4–7	10–6
Baltimore	6–5	—	6–6	2–9	5–6	10–1	5–6	7–3	3–9	8–3	6–5	5–7	6–5	5–7	5–11
Boston	5–6	6–6	—	5–6	8–3	5–5	8–3	5–6	5–7	9–2	7–4	9–3	6–5	5–7	9–7
Chicago	6–5	9–2	6–5	—	6–6	6–6	8–4	6–6	4–7	4–7	4–7	5–6	5–6	4–6–1	7–9
Cleveland	7–4	6–5	3–8	6–6	—	9–3	8–4	6–6	4–7	3–8	9–2	7–3	4–7	7–4	10–6
Detroit	3–8	1–10	5–5	6–6	3–9	—	6–6	8–4	3–8	7–4	3–8	5–6	3–8	5–6	7–9
Kansas City	5–6	6–5	3–8	4–8	4–8	6–6	—	7–5	0–10	7–4	4–6	8–3	3–8	6–5	9–7
Minnesota	5–6	3–7	6–5	6–6	6–6	4–8	5–7	—	4–7	4–7	2–9	7–4	7–4	4–7	7–9
New York	5–6	9–3	7–5	7–4	7–4	8–3	10–0	7–4	—	8–3	8–3	11–1	8–3	6–6	13–3
Oakland	7–5	3–8	2–9	7–4	8–3	4–7	4–7	7–4	3–8	—	5–7	5–6	6–6	5–6	8–8
Seattle	3–9	5–6	4–7	7–4	2–9	8–3	6–4	9–2	3–8	7–5	—	6–5	5–7	4–7	7–9
Tampa Bay	5–6	7–5	3–9	6–5	3–7	6–5	3–8	4–7	1–11	6–5	5–6	—	4–7	5–7	5–11
Texas	7–5	5–6	5–6	6–5	7–4	8–3	8–3	4–7	3–8	6–6	7–5	7–4	—	7–4	8–8
Toronto	7–4	7–5	7–5	6–4–1	4–7	6–5	5–6	7–4	6–6	6–5	7–4	7–5	4–7	—	9–7

=== Notable transactions ===
- May 27, 1998: Jim Abbott signed as a free agent with the Chicago White Sox.
- June 2, 1998: Aaron Rowand was drafted by the Chicago White Sox in the 1st round (35th pick) of the 1998 amateur draft. Player signed June 12, 1998.
- June 2, 1998: Mark Buehrle was drafted by the Chicago White Sox in the 38th round of the 1998 amateur draft. Player signed May 21, 1999.
- June 7, 1998: Howard Battle was released by the Chicago White Sox.
- July 16, 1998: Jason Bere was released by the Chicago White Sox.
- July 30, 1998: Charlie O'Brien was traded by the Chicago White Sox to the Anaheim Angels for Brian Tokarse (minors) and Jason Stockstill (minors).

=== Roster ===
1998 Chicago White Sox
Roster
Pitchers: 25 Jim Abbott; 37 James Baldwin; 46 Jason Bere; 44 Chad Bradford; 50 Larry Casian; 43 Carlos Castillo; 49 Tony Castillo; 36 Scott Eyre; 32 Tom Fordham; 29 Keith Foulke; 66 Mike Heathcott; 62 Bob Howry; 47 Matt Karchner; 38 Jaime Navarro; 40 Jim Parque; 52 Todd Rizzo; 41 Bill Simas; 33 Mike Sirotka; 59 John Snyder; 56 Bryan Ward	Catchers: 57 Mark Johnson; 15 Chad Kreuter; 55 Robert Machado; 22 Charlie O'Brien; Infielders: 12,17 Mike Caruso; 12 Wil Cordero; 5 Ray Durham; 31 Greg Norton; 10 Chris Snopek; 35 Frank Thomas; 23 Robin Ventura; 28 Craig Wilson	Outfielders: 45 Jeff Abbott; 8 Albert Belle; 24 Mike Cameron; 54,26 Lou Frazier; 30 Magglio Ordóñez; 44 Rubén Sierra; 27 Brian Simmons	Manager: 7 Jerry Manuel; Coaches: 52 Ron Jackson; 18 Wallace Johnson; 53 Art Kusnyer; 20 Bryan Little; 21 Joe Nossek; 25 Mike Pazik; 58 Mark Salas

== Player stats ==
=== Batting ===
Note: G = Games played; AB = At bats; R = Runs scored; H = Hits; 2B = Doubles; 3B = Triples; HR = Home runs; RBI = Runs batted in; BB = Base on balls; SO = Strikeouts; AVG = Batting average; SB = Stolen bases

Player	G	AB	R	H	2B	3B	HR	RBI	BB	SO	AVG	SB
Jeff Abbott, OF	89	244	33	68	14	1	12	41	9	28	.279	3
James Baldwin, P	37	2	0	0	0	0	0	0	0	1	.000	0
Albert Belle, LF	163	609	113	200	48	2	49	152	81	84	.328	6
Mike Cameron, CF	141	396	53	83	16	5	8	43	37	101	.210	27
Mike Caruso, SS	133	523	81	160	17	6	5	55	14	38	.306	22
Carlos Castillo, P	54	1	0	0	0	0	0	0	0	0	.000	0
Wil Cordero, 1B, OF	96	341	58	91	18	2	13	49	22	66	.267	2
Ray Durham, 2B	158	635	126	181	35	8	19	67	73	105	.285	36
Scott Eyre, P	33	3	0	0	0	0	0	0	0	3	.000	0
Tom Fordham, P	29	1	0	0	0	0	0	0	0	1	.000	0
Lou Frazier, CF	7	7	0	0	0	0	0	0	2	6	.000	4
Mark Johnson, C	7	23	2	2	0	2	0	1	1	8	.087	0
Chad Kreuter, C	93	245	26	62	9	1	2	33	32	45	.253	1
Robert Machado, C	34	111	14	23	6	0	3	15	7	22	.207	0
Jaime Navarro, P	37	1	0	0	0	0	0	0	0	0	.000	0
Greg Norton, 1B, 3B	105	299	38	71	17	2	9	36	26	77	.237	3
Charlie O'Brien, C	57	164	12	43	9	0	4	18	9	31	.262	0
Magglio Ordóñez, RF	145	535	70	151	25	2	14	65	28	53	.282	9
Jim Parque, P	21	1	0	0	0	0	0	0	0	0	.000	0
Rubén Sierra, OF, DH	27	74	7	16	4	1	4	11	3	11	.216	2
Brian Simmons, OF	5	19	4	7	0	0	2	6	0	2	.368	0
Mike Sirotka, P	33	4	0	0	0	0	0	0	1	0	.000	0
Chris Snopek, SS, 2B	53	125	17	26	2	0	1	4	14	24	.208	3
Frank Thomas, DH, 1B	160	585	109	155	35	2	29	109	110	93	.265	7
Robin Ventura, 3B	161	590	84	155	31	4	21	91	79	111	.263	1
Craig Wilson, SS, 2B, 3B	13	47	14	22	5	0	3	10	3	6	.468	1
Team totals	163	5585	861	1516	291	38	198	806	551	916	.271	127

=== Pitching ===
Note: W = Wins; L = Losses; ERA = Earned run average; G = Games pitched; GS = Games started; SV = Saves; IP = Innings pitched; H = Hits allowed; R = Runs allowed; ER = Earned runs allowed; HR = Home runs allowed; BB = Walks allowed; K = Strikeouts

Player	W	L	ERA	G	GS	SV	IP	H	R	ER	HR	BB	K
Jim Abbott	5	0	4.55	5	5	0	31.2	35	16	16	2	12	14
James Baldwin	13	6	5.32	37	24	0	159.0	176	103	94	18	62	108
Jason Bere	3	7	6.45	18	15	0	83.2	98	71	60	14	58	53
Chad Bradford	2	1	3.32	29	0	1	30.2	27	16	11	0	7	11
Larry Casian	0	0	11.25	4	0	0	4.0	8	5	5	0	1	6
Carlos Castillo	6	4	5.11	54	2	0	100.1	94	61	57	17	36	64
Tony Castillo	1	2	8.00	25	0	0	27.0	38	25	24	7	11	14
Scott Eyre	3	8	5.38	33	17	0	107.0	114	78	64	24	64	73
Tom Fordham	1	2	6.75	29	5	0	48.0	51	36	36	7	42	23
Keith Foulke	3	2	4.13	54	0	1	65.1	51	31	30	9	23	57
Mike Heathcott	0	0	3.00	1	0	0	3.0	2	1	1	0	1	3
Bob Howry	0	3	3.15	44	0	9	54.1	37	20	19	7	21	51
Matt Karchner	2	4	5.15	32	0	11	36.2	33	21	21	2	25	30
Jaime Navarro	8	16	6.36	37	27	1	172.2	223	135	122	30	78	71
Jim Parque	7	5	5.10	21	21	0	113.0	135	72	64	14	49	77
Todd Rizzo	0	0	13.50	9	0	0	6.2	12	12	10	0	6	3
Bill Simas	4	3	3.57	60	0	18	70.2	54	29	28	12	26	56
Mike Sirotka	14	15	5.06	33	33	0	211.2	255	137	119	30	47	128
John Snyder	7	2	4.80	15	14	0	86.1	96	49	46	14	24	52
Bryan Ward	1	2	3.33	28	0	1	27.0	30	13	10	4	7	17
Team totals	80	82	5.22	163	163	42	1438.2	1569	931	835	211	600	911

== Farm system ==
Level	Team	League	Manager
AAA	Calgary Cannons	Pacific Coast League	Tom Spencer
AA	Birmingham Barons	Southern League	Dave Huppert
A	Winston-Salem Warthogs	Carolina League	Chris Cron
A	Hickory Crawdads	South Atlantic League	Mark Haley
Rookie	Bristol White Sox	Appalachian League	Nick Capra
Rookie	AZL White Sox	Arizona League	Tony Peña

LEAGUE CHAMPIONS: Bristol
