= Efraín Valdez =

Dominican baseball player (born 1966)

- Pitcher
- Born: July 11, 1966 (age 60); Nizao, Dominican Republic
- Batted: Left Threw: Left

MLB debut
- August 13, 1990, for the Cleveland Indians

Last MLB appearance
- July 10, 1998, for the Arizona Diamondbacks

MLB statistics
- Win–loss record: 1–1
- Earned run average: 2.91
- Strikeouts: 6

CPBL statistics
- Win–loss record: 2–0
- Earned run average: 2.27
- Strikeouts: 15

KBO statistics
- Win–loss record: 10–9
- Earned run average: 4.65
- Strikeouts: 80
- Stats at Baseball Reference

Teams
- Cleveland Indians (1990–1991); China Times Eagles (1995); Arizona Diamondbacks (1998); Chinatrust Whales (1999); LG Twins (2001)

Efraín Antonio Valdez (born July 11, 1966) is a Dominican former professional baseball pitcher. Valdez played Major League Baseball for the Cleveland Indians in 1990 and 1991 and the Arizona Diamondbacks in 1998. He also played for the Korea Baseball Organization with the LG Twins in 2001.

== Professional career ==
Efraín Valdez's playing career lasted twenty years and during that time Valdez played with a number of different clubs in five countries: The United States, The Dominican Republic, Mexico, Taiwan and South Korea.

=== Padres organization ===
Valdez began his professional playing career on May 4, 1983, when he was signed by the San Diego Padres as an amateur free agent. Valdez was assigned to the short season class "A" Northwest League's Spokane Indians. After playing two seasons, 1983 and 1984, with Spokane, Valdez was purchased from the Padres by the Texas Rangers on December 10, 1984.

=== Rangers organization ===
Although he did not play in the minor leagues in 1985, Valdez began playing professionally outside the United States, playing a season in the Dominican Summer League. He began the 1986 baseball season in the Mexican League but returned to the Rangers organization, where he was assigned to the class double "A" Texas League's Tulsa Drillers of the Texas League. In 1987, Valdez was sent down to class "A" and spent time with the Florida State League's Charlotte Rangers before returning to the Drillers. After another season with Tulsa in 1988, Valdez was drafted from the Rangers by the Cleveland Indians in the 1988 rule 5 draft on December 5, 1988.

=== Indians organization ===
The Indians assigned Valdez to the Canton–Akron Indians of the class double-A Eastern League, where Valdez would play during the 1989 season.

The 1990 season was a year filled with highlights for Valdez. He started the season at triple-A with the Colorado Springs Sky Sox of the Pacific Coast League, then made his major league debut on August 13, 1990, for the Indians. On September 21, Valdez earned his only major league win against the Toronto Blue Jays.

Valdez once again saw playing time with the Colorado Springs Sky Sox and the Cleveland Indians during the 1991 season. But Valdez was placed on waivers by the Cleveland Indians and later selected off waivers by the Toronto Blue Jays on July 3, 1991.

=== Blue Jays organization ===
After being picked up by Toronto, Valdez was assigned to the triple-A Syracuse Chiefs of the International League, where he finished the 1991 season. On October 15, 1991, Valdez was granted free agency, and he signed with the Milwaukee Brewers on November 28, 1991.

=== Milwaukee Brewers organization ===
After signing with Milwaukee, the Brewers assigned Valdez to the Denver Zephyrs of the triple-A American Association for the 1992 season. After spending the 1992 season with the Zephyrs as well, Valdez once again left the states and began playing in Mexico.

=== Overseas ===
After two seasons in the Mexican League 1993–94 Valdez played a season overseas in the Taiwan League in 1995 before returning to the Mexican League for two more years 1996–97.

=== 1998: Mets and Diamondbacks ===
Valdez returned to the states in 1998 when he was signed as a free agent by the New York Mets on January 24, 1998. After signing with the Mets Valdez was assigned to the Norfolk Tides of the triple-A International League for the 1998 season. On May 26, 1998, Valdez was purchased by the Arizona Diamondbacks from the New York Mets and assigned to the Tucson Sidewinders of the triple-A Pacific Coast League. Valdez had a career highlight that season when he made a return to the Major Leagues in 1998 playing with the Arizona Diamondbacks.

=== Remaining career ===
After leaving organized baseball Valdez played a year of independent baseball in 1999 with the Atlantic League's Atlantic City Surf. The following year Valdez returned to the Mexican League and played the 2000 season with the Mexico City Tigres. After spending 2001 with the LG Twins of the KBO, Valdez's career came to a close with two more seasons in the Mexican League. Valdez played with the Cordoba Cafeteros and Tabasco Olmecas in 2002 and with Tabasco and Vaqueros Laguna in 2003.

== Personal life ==
Valdez is the older brother of former major league pitcher Carlos Valdez, and cousin to three other former major leaguers, Sergio Valdez, Julio Valdez and Rafael Valdez.
