= Jim Leyritz =

American baseball player (born 1963)

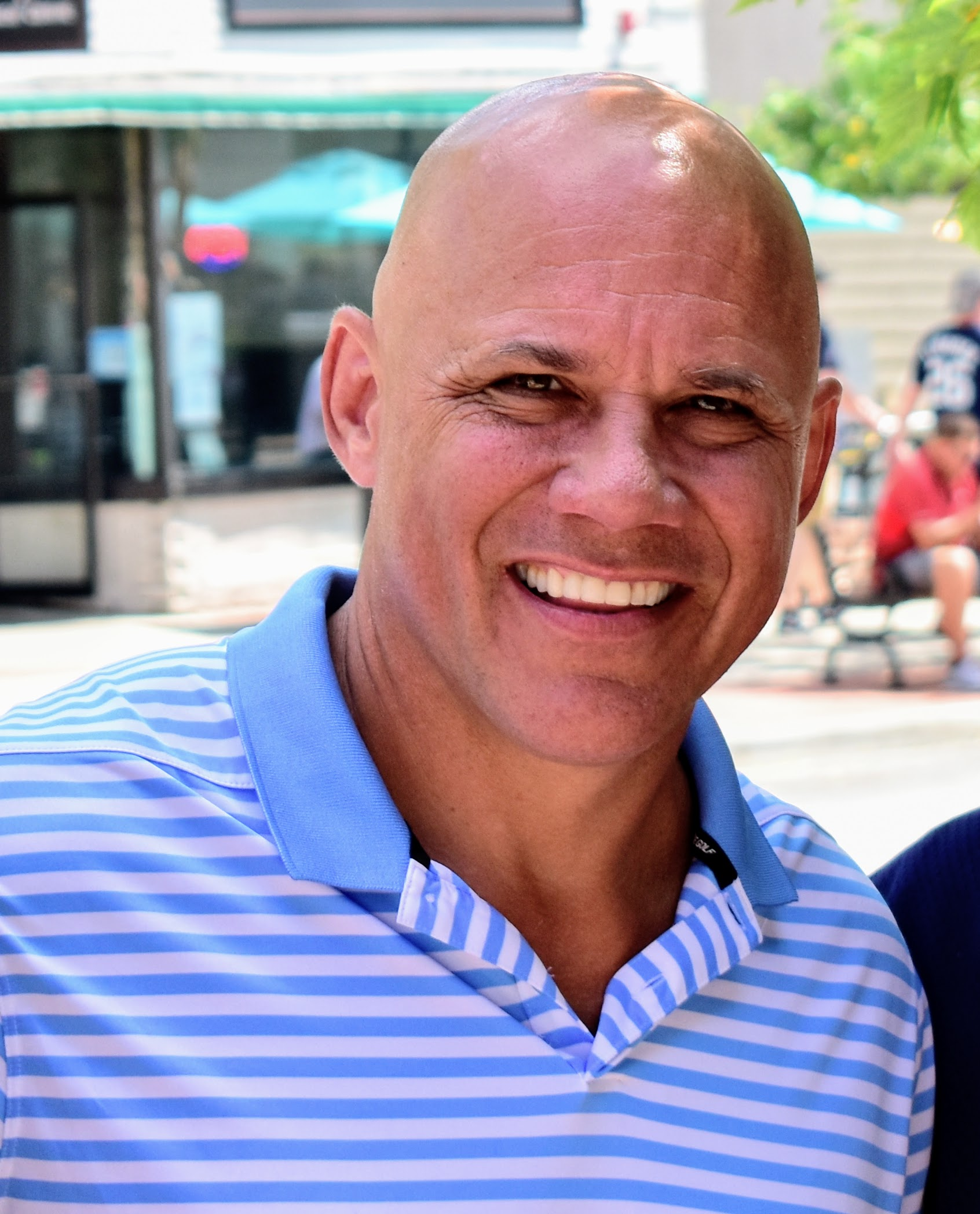
- Leyritz at Baseball Hall of Fame Weekend in 2019
- Catcher / Infielder / Outfielder
- Born: December 27, 1963 (age 62); Lakewood, Ohio, U.S.
- Batted: Right Threw: Right

MLB debut
- June 8, 1990, for the New York Yankees

Last MLB appearance
- September 13, 2000, for the Los Angeles Dodgers

MLB statistics
- Batting average: .264
- Home runs: 90
- Runs batted in: 387
- Stats at Baseball Reference

Teams
- New York Yankees (1990–1996); Anaheim Angels (1997); Texas Rangers (1997); Boston Red Sox (1998); San Diego Padres (1998–1999); New York Yankees (1999–2000); Los Angeles Dodgers (2000)

Career highlights and awards
- 2× World Series champion (1996, 1999)

James Joseph Leyritz (born December 27, 1963) is an American former professional baseball catcher and infielder. In his 11-year Major League Baseball (MLB) career, Leyritz played for the New York Yankees, Anaheim Angels, Texas Rangers, Boston Red Sox, San Diego Padres, and Los Angeles Dodgers. With the Yankees, Leyritz was a member of the 1996 and 1999 World Series championships, both over the Atlanta Braves.

In December 2007 he was involved in a fatal collision in Broward County, Florida. He was acquitted of DUI manslaughter in November 2010 and convicted of a misdemeanour charge of driving under the influence, receiving one year's probation and a $500 fine.

== Early years ==
Leyritz grew up in Anderson Township, Hamilton County, Ohio with his parents, brother, and sister, and attended Turpin High School in Cincinnati, Ohio. He then attended Middle Georgia College, a junior college in Cochran, Georgia, before transferring to the University of Kentucky. At Kentucky, Leyritz played college baseball for the Kentucky Wildcats baseball team.

== Baseball career ==
After playing the 1985 season for the Kentucky Wildcats, Leyritz went undrafted by Major League Baseball (MLB), but was signed as a free agent by the New York Yankees. Leyritz made his MLB debut for the Yankees on June 8, 1990.

His playing days were highlighted by a pair of memorable postseason home runs he hit with the Yankees in 1995 and 1996 in comeback wins. In Game 2 of the 1995 American League Division Series against the Seattle Mariners at Yankee Stadium, in rainy conditions, Leyritz hit a walk-off two-run home run to right-center field in the 15th inning, giving the Yankees a 7–5 victory and a two-games-to-none lead in the best-of-five series. The home run was surrendered by Mariners pitcher Tim Belcher, who was famously involved in a profanity-laced incident with a cameraman covering him walking through the tunnel to the clubhouse afterwards.

The best known of Leyritz's playoff heroics occurred in Game 4 of the 1996 World Series against the Atlanta Braves at Atlanta–Fulton County Stadium. In the series, the Yankees trailed the Braves two games to one, and in Game 4, the Yankees trailed, 6–0, after five innings. The Yankees rallied for three runs in the 6th inning, setting the stage for Leyritz in the 8th inning. Facing Atlanta closer Mark Wohlers with one out and two runners on base, Leyritz hit a three-run home run to left field to tie the game and cap the improbable Yankee comeback. "In the air to left field... back, at the track, at the wall, we are tied!" said announcer Joe Buck on national television. The Yankees eventually won the game, 8–6, in 10 innings to tie the series. In Game 5, Leyritz caught pitchers Andy Pettitte and John Wetteland for a 1–0 shutout, and the Yankees clinched their championship with a victory in Game 6.

After the 1996 season, the Yankees traded Leyritz to the Anaheim Angels for two players to be named later (PTBNL): minor leaguers Jeremy Blevins and Ryan Kane. On July 29, 1997, the Angels traded Leyritz and a PTBNL (minor leaguer Rob Sasser) to the Texas Rangers for Ken Hill. After the season, the Rangers traded Leyritz to the Boston Red Sox with Damon Buford for Mark Brandenburg, Bill Haselman, and Aaron Sele.

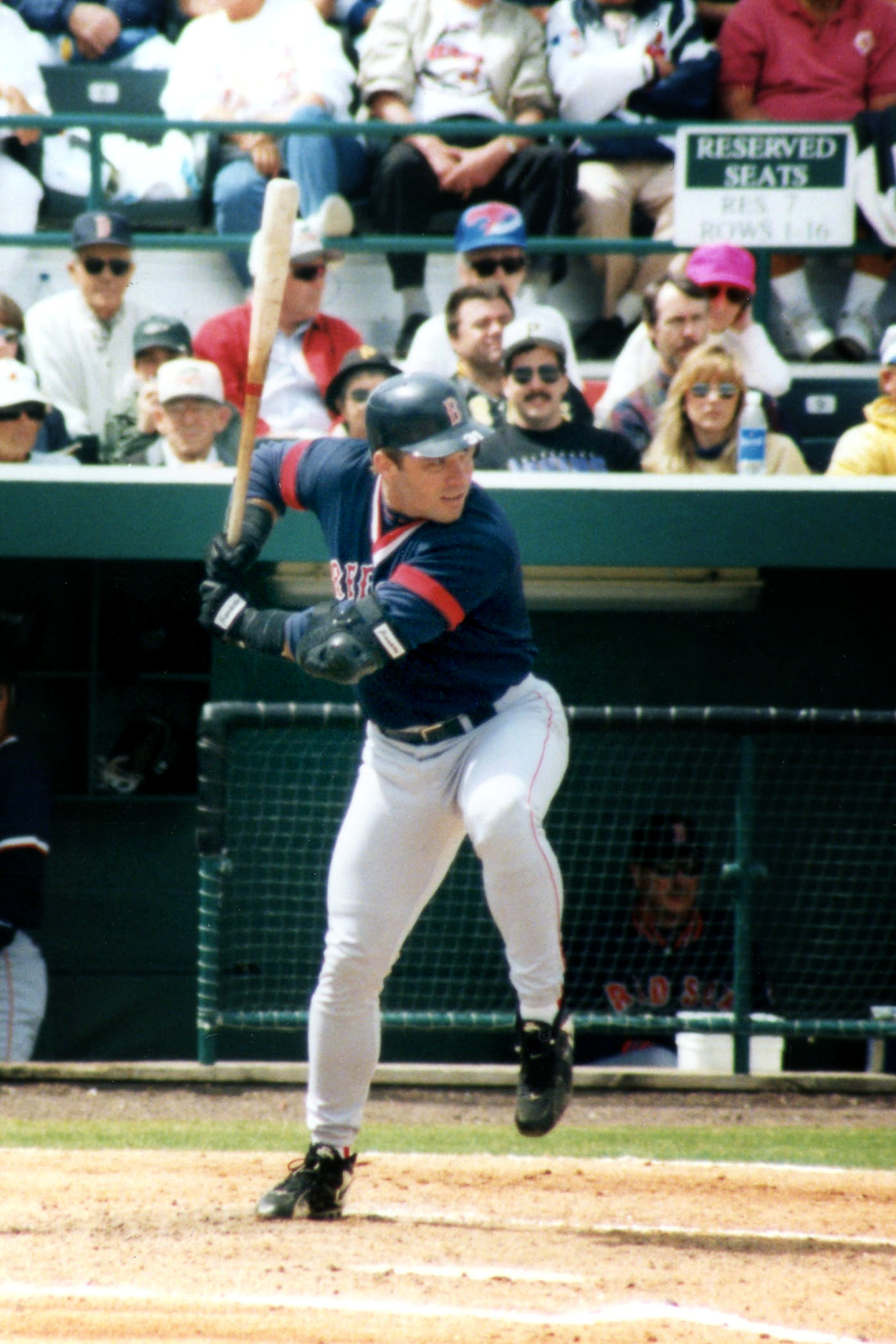
Leyritz with the Red Sox in spring training in 1998

On June 20, 1998, the Red Sox traded Leyritz with Ethan Faggett to the San Diego Padres for Carlos Reyes, Mandy Romero and Darío Veras. Leyritz had a number of unlikely playoff home runs and clutch hits that season. The most dramatic of them came in Game 2 of the National League Division Series against Houston Astros pitcher Billy Wagner. Leyritz hit an opposite-field game-tying home run off the right field foul pole in the top of the 9th inning. However, the Astros won the game in the bottom half of the inning. In Game 3, Leyritz hit the eventual game-winning home run against Scott Elarton in the bottom of the 7th inning that broke a 1–1 tie. Overall, Leyritz batted .400 with three home runs and five runs batted in in that series. Leyritz's Padres were matched against his former team, the Yankees, in the 1998 World Series. During player introductions in Game 1 at Yankee Stadium, Leyritz received a standing ovation from the fans who remembered his heroics from two years earlier. He went hitless in ten at bats in a four-game Yankees sweep.

On July 31, 1999, the Padres traded Leyritz to the Yankees for Geraldo Padua. The Yankees advanced to the 1999 World Series, and in Game 4, in the bottom of the 8th inning, Leyritz hit a solo home run to extend the Yankees' lead to 4–1 and help them complete a sweep of the Braves to win a championship. NBC commentator Bob Costas remarked incredulously about Leyritz after the home run, "You could send this guy to a resort during the spring and summer, as long as he comes back in October." That home run was the last one to be hit in the 1990s.

On June 20, 2000, the Yankees traded Leyritz to the Los Angeles Dodgers for José Vizcaíno and cash. Although he was traded midway during the 2000 season before the Yankees won their third straight World Series title and fourth in five seasons, Leyritz was awarded his third World Series ring by the Yankees.

Leyritz became a free agent after the 2000 season, and signed in 2001 with the Newark Bears of the independent Atlantic League. His performance there led to a contract with the Padres, who assigned him to AAA. He did not receive a call-up to the Major Leagues.

Leyritz served as a pinch-hitter toward the end of his career. He batted and threw right-handed exclusively in the majors, but was known to switch-hit in the minor leagues.

=== Amphetamine use ===
On June 8, 2006, while doing an interview on the Opie and Anthony show on XM Satellite Radio, Leyritz admitted to using amphetamines during his playing career when they were not against the rules. The statement came in the wake of an admission by pitcher Jason Grimsley that he used performance-enhancing drugs throughout his career.

=== Idiosyncrasies at the plate ===
Leyritz was known for using an unusual stance which involved keeping his front leg (left leg) straight and stiff while his back leg (right leg) behind him considerably bent at the knee. He did this while circling his bat around behind his head, waiting for the pitch. After each pitch that Leyritz did not put into play or strike out on, he grabbed the bat by its center and twirled it at his hip like a baton. He has said that former Yankee Mickey Rivers taught him how to twirl the bat at his hip.

Leyritz was also Pettitte's personal catcher in 1995–96 and again in 1999–2000.

== Career after baseball ==
In February 2011, Leyritz was hired as a pitching coach for the Newark Bears. He left the team after one season, wanting to spend more time with his family.

On April 14, 2012, it was announced that Leyritz was returning to the Yankees on a personal services contract.

=== Radio ===
From 2004 to 2007, Leyritz co-hosted a radio show with Vinny Micucci and Billy Sample called MLB Radio Daily on MLB Radio and is a regular contributor to The Michael Kay Show on the New York City ESPN Radio affiliate.

In October 2007, Leyritz worked with Harold Reynolds and Chris Myers covering the pre- and post-game reports on the field for the 2007 Playoffs and World Series for Fox.com.

On January 6, 2014, Leyritz was hired to host a radio show for Angels Radio 830AM with Jason Brennan called "Inside The Game" with Leyritz and Brennan. The show was later postponed due to a conflict with ESPN radio.

Starting in March 2016, Leyritz co-hosted a nationally syndicated weekly radio show with David Meltzer called "Sports Blender" on SB Nation radio.

=== Writing ===
Leyritz wrote a book titled Catching Heat: The Jim Leyritz Story, published in June 2011. The book was co-written by brothers Jeffrey Lyons and Douglas B. Lyons. In a brief review, Publishers Weekly called the book "a surprisingly defensive attempt at a self-serving memoir."

=== Charitable work ===
Leyritz is involved with many charities. He is the spokesperson for Pinktie.org /1st Equity Title Co out of Melville, NY. He also works with many chapters of ALS, a disease which took his brother-in-law, Joe Toerner, in 2010. During his playing days, Leyritz and his wife brought foster children to see games at Yankee Stadium and contributed to Covenant House and Police Benevolent Association.

== Personal life ==
Leyritz has three sons.

=== Legal troubles ===
On December 28, 2007, Leyritz was arrested in Broward County, Florida on suspicion of drunk driving and vehicular homicide after his car struck Freida Veitch's car. Veitch, who was not wearing a seat belt, was ejected from the car and died at the scene. Leyritz was released on US$11,000 bond and charged with two counts of drunk driving. Police collected two blood samples from Leyritz, the first 2½ hours after the crash and the second about an hour later. The first sample showed a blood-alcohol level of .14, and the second, .13, police said. Veitch had a blood-alcohol level of .18. Both Leyritz and Veitch were legally drunk at the time of the collision.

Several days after the accident, it was revealed that Leyritz could face further charges because his driver license had been suspended in New York prior to the accident. On June 20, 2007, Leyritz had been issued a ticket outside Albany, New York, for using a cell phone while driving. According to Leyritz's attorney, Leyritz's license "was not suspended in the state of Florida on the day of the accident, nor is it suspended today."

On February 13, 2009, Leyritz was ordered back to jail as his bail was revoked following his apparent consumption of alcoholic beverages in violation of his bail conditions. A judge allowed him to return home on bail on February 23 after agreeing with Leyritz's attorney that his pretrial release conditions were unclear and that Leyritz had misunderstood them.

On May 13, 2009, Leyritz was hospitalized in Florida. Reports on ESPN claimed Leyritz had threatened suicide, but Leyritz issued a statement later saying he was not suicidal but stressed out. Leyritz ran into trouble on May 14 when he attempted to start his car but the alcohol monitoring device on the car malfunctioned, leading to a false positive and triggering an automatic urine test for Leyritz. The test showed he had not consumed any alcohol, and a judge cleared him.

On July 2, 2009, Leyritz was arrested for battery against his former wife; however, the charges were later dropped.

In November 2010, Leyritz's trial for the December 2007 DUI crash was held. He was acquitted on the DUI manslaughter charge in less than 45 minutes, but was convicted—after two days of deliberations—on a misdemeanor charge of driving under the influence. He was subsequently sentenced to one year's probation and a $500 fine. In May 2010, Leyritz's insurance company settled a civil lawsuit for the accident, paying $350,000 to the other driver's family.
