= Nizao =

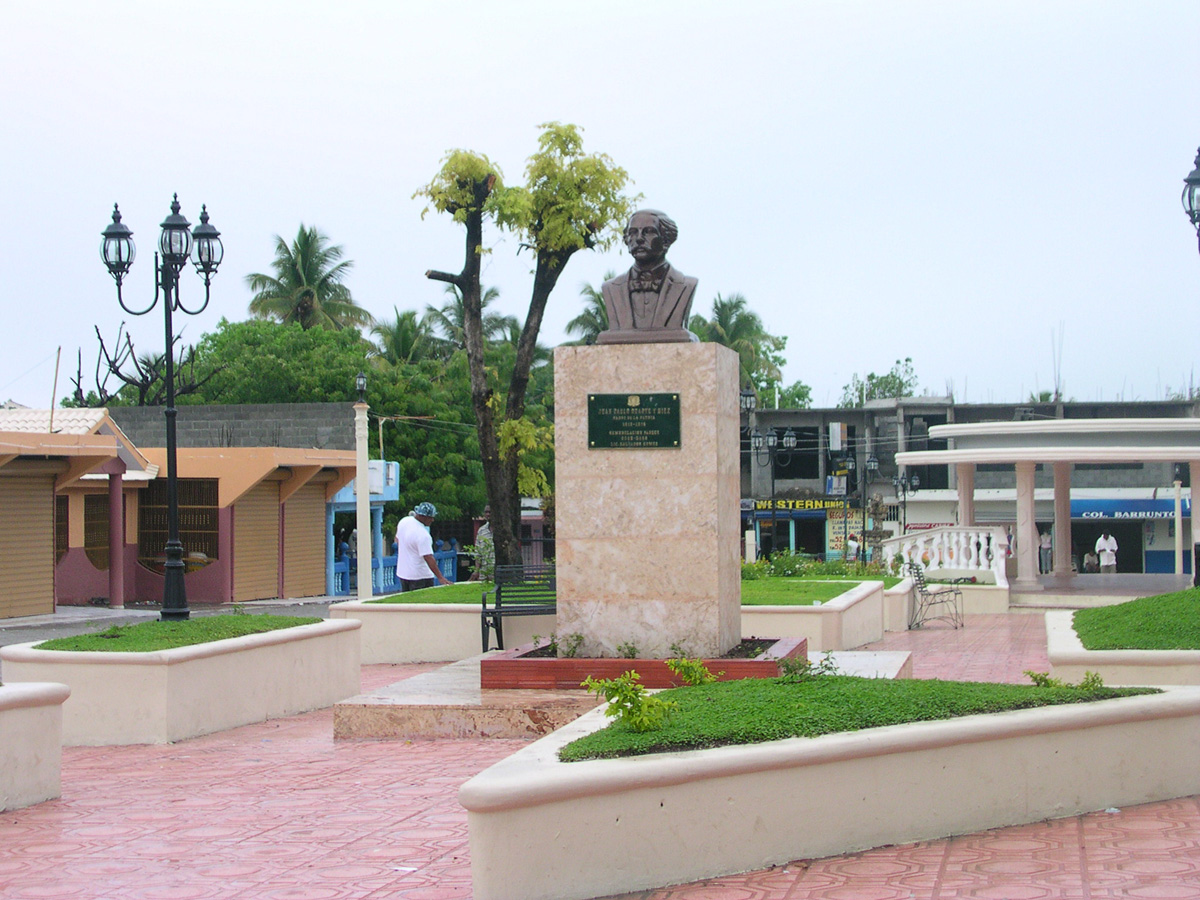
- Juan Pablo Duarte Square, Nizao

- Location within the Dominican Republic
- Coordinates: 18°15′0″N 70°12′0″W
- Country: Dominican Republic
- Province: Peravia

Area
  - Total: 48.54 km^{2} (18.74 sq mi)

Population (2012)
  - Total: 39,686
  - Density: 817.6/km^{2} (2,118/sq mi)
- Municipal Districts: 2

Nizao is a city in the province of Peravia in the Dominican Republic.

== General information ==
Nizao is a city in the Dominican Republic and capital of the Nizao Municipality. It is the second large municipality of the Peravia Province and is located in southeastern corner of this province, in the angle formed by the estuary of the Nizao River and the Caribbean Sea coast. It is well known for being the city of the luxury cars in the country and they are all owned by "carajitos firmao" as the local people call young professional athletes.

== The municipality ==
Nizao was founded in the 16th century when Diego, Christopher Columbus' firstborn son, built a sugar mill and plantation along Nizao River. The Nizao Municipality is divided into two municipal districts, Santana and Pizarrete, and one municipal section, Don Gregorio. Nizao was elevated to the category of Municipal District on January 1, 1945, and to Municipality in 1989. As a municipality, Nizao elected its authorities (Mayor and councilmen) for the first time in the 1990 general elections, in which were elected Salvador Clemente Pérez Pérez, a school teacher, as its first mayor and Juan Bautista Salvador (Guancho), Confesor Meléndez (Confe), Ramón Garcia Valdez (Ramón Garganta), Isidro Indalecio Valdez and Víctor Pérez as its first councilmen. It's believed that Nizao and the town of Don Gregorio will merge into one city in the future.

== The city ==
The economy of Nizao County for decades was based on the agriculture, especially rice, onion, chilis, tomato, etc., which has been substituted, to a large extent due to the international emigration of the Nizao people, the demographic and urban growth that has reduced the arable lands, by the rented labor, the motoconcho (motorcycles transportation system in the Dominican Republic) and the export of players to American professional baseball. Fishing has another major impact in Nizao economy.

Nizao also has a beautiful beach (playa Linda) that extends for almost 3 km (1.9 mi) from Don Gregorio to Catalina, Baní. Early in the 1980s. all farmers who owned land close to the beach sold their properties to Complejo Vacasional (COVACASA) Consortium. More than 50 houses, a club house, and an artificial lake, were built and sold to individual owners as vacation homes. Covacasa is an international community, where Dominicans, Dutch, Italians, Americans have their first and second homes.

For the last few years, there was a big increase in international investments in this beach village. Many internationals (in particular Dutch and Italian families) are purchasing building ground and houses. The new Highway to Santo Domingo is almost ready (as of 2010) and will connect Nizao with the capital in half an hour by highway.

== Nizao mayors ==
Mayor	Term	Political Party
Salvador Clemente Pérez Pérez	1990–1994	Dominican Liberation Party – PLD
Rosario Valdez Paulino	1994–1998	Dominican Revolutionary Party – PRD
Lic. Demetrio Antonio Paulino Ramírez	1998–2002	Dominican Revolutionary Party – PRD
Lic. Salvador Gómez	2002–2006	Social Christian Reformist Party – PRSC
Lic. Salvador Gómez	2006–2010	Social Christian Reformist Party – PRSC
Lic. Glovis Reyes Aglon	2010–2016	Dominican Revolutionary Party – PRD
Salvador Clemente Pérez Pérez	2016–2020	Dominican Liberation Party – PLD

New elections were celebrated on May 16, 2010. Mr. Gomez was seeking re-election against former deputy Lic. Glovis Reyes who was the victor. The new Dominican Constitution extended the municipal and congressional electoral period from four years to six years terms so these elections can be held at the same time of the presidential ones.

== Demographics ==
According to the latest National Census of Population and Family (Censo Nacional de Poblacion y Familia) conducted in 2002, Nizao City population was 6,188 people while the total population for the entire municipality, including its two districts, was 22,850. Most people in Nizao are of mixed race of Canary Islands and of African slaves descendants, with a significant black minority and a smaller white one. Nizao people are recognized as hard working and friendly.

Nizao is subdivided into five peripheral sectors or wards:

=== El Zapotal ===
El Zapotal is plain located on top of a hill to the northeast and which used to be a municipal section. El Zapotal was a sugarcane mill and plantation during the colonial times then inhabited by the families Gonzalez and Lorenzo. It is rich in agriculture.

=== Mono Mojao ===
Mono Mojao (wet monkey) is located to north around the baseball field. Pérez and Valdez families are the two major groups concentrated in this area.

=== Media Blanca ===
Media Blanca (white stocking) is located to the west/northwest. It is the most folkloric and ethnic part of Nizao. African roots, beliefs, and culture are strong in this part of the city. Perdomo and Valdez families are the larger family groups in this sector.

=== Ciudad Nueva ===
Ciudad Nueva (new city) is located to the southeast.

The remaining area is just called Nizao. The city is also growing to the southwest part with the incorporation of the Ciudad del Niño area, a few houses constructed along Marcos A. Cabral canal (La Regola), where the Mercedes family estates.

=== Covacasa residential ===
The gated community of Covacasa Nizao is located at the beach. It contains villas with a seaview over the Caribbean Sea. The beach is accessible for the residents of Covacasa.

== History ==
Nizao was an original settlement of Canary Islands immigrant families to the northeast of Don Gregorio Gonsales sugar mill (the actual town of Don Gregorio) and to the south of Zapote Plantation sugar mill (El Zapotal as for today) on the hill overseeing the Nizao river and the Caribbean Sea.

Late in the 19th century, the top of Nizao hill become a battlefield due to the confrontation of the militants of the two bloody Dominican political parties, Los Bolos (tailless) and Coludos (long tail). This battle took place around the El Tamarindo (tamarind tree) on Juan Pablo Duarte square.

== Education ==
The City of Nizao has two schools: one elementary school (escuela primaria) and one high school (liceo). Both schools were housed in the same facility called Aliro Paulino Elementary and Aliro Paulino High School. Aliro Paulino was a personal teacher of Rafael Leónidas Trujillo's family. He was originally from Don Gregorio. Aliro Paulino High School, today Lucila Mojica high School, was an evening school that operated in the Aliro Paulino Elementary school from 1978 to the year 2000 when its new facility opened its doors at the corner of Maximo Gomez and Gaston F Deligne (southbound) streets.

The nearest and best international schools in the Caribbean are in Santo Domingo, which is half an hour by the new highway. The Saint George school (international IB program), The Carol Morgan school and the new Horizon school are on top of the list.

== Sports ==
Nizao lacks major sport facilities. The only basketball and volleyball courts are those of rough concrete located at the public schools' estates. they were often open in the afternoon for the public, but those sports are no longer played in Nizao. Like the whole Dominican Republic, baseball is the king sport. Nizao has a baseball field that has been under construction since the last 20 years. Nizao has produced a huge number of professional baseball players, among them, Efrain Valdez, Julio Valdez, Rafael Valdez, Felix Perdomo, Carlos Valdez, Sandi Santiago, Wilson Valdez, Deivi Cruz, Rafael Cruz, Oneil Cruz, Vladimir Guerrero, Wilton Guerrero, Jesus Sanchez, Ketel Marte and more prospects navigating through the Baseball Minor Leagues farm system.

== Religion ==
Like the majority of Dominicans, more than 90% of Nizaeros say they are Catholic, even though less than 5% actually go to church. There are also different groups of protestants in Nizao, of whom Pentecostals are the larger group. There are also Mormon (The Church of Jesus Christ of Latter-day Saints) chapels and Seventh-day Adventist churches in Nizao.

=== Churches ===
- Nuestra Señora de las Mercedes Catholic Church, at the corners of Duarte, Sánchez, and Maria Trinidad Sánchez streets.
- Iglesia Evangelica Peniel, at Duarte Street.
- Seventh-day Adventist Temple, at Ruben Perdomo Street.
- Iglesia Evangelica Asamblea de Dios, Sanchez Street.
- The Church of Jesus Christ of Latter-day Saints (Mormons) chapel, at Mella street.

== Notable people from Nizao ==
- Ketel Marte, professional baseball player.
- Deivi Cruz, professional baseball player.
- Vladimir Guerrero, professional baseball player and National Baseball Hall of Fame 2018 inductee.
- Wilson Valdez, professional baseball player.
- Efraín Valdez, professional baseball player.
- Oneil Cruz, professional baseball player.
- Marileidy Paulino, Olympic Gold medalist in 400m, 2024

== See also ==
- Don Gregorio (town)
