= Glovis Reyes Aglon =

Glovis Reyes Aglón
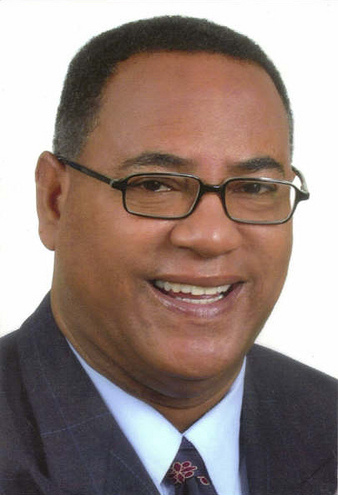

5th Mayor of Nizao
- In office August 16, 2010 – August 16, 2016
- Preceded by: Salvador Gómez
- Succeeded by: Salvador Clemente Pérez y Pérez

Personal details
- Born: February 1, 1958 (age 68) Don Gregorio, Nizao
- Party: Dominican Revolutionary Party (PRD)
- Education: Universidad Autónoma de Santo Domingo (B.A. in Psychology)

Lic. Glovis Reyes Aglón is the current mayor of the city of Nizao, Dominican Republic, elected on the municipal elections celebrated on May 16, 2010.

== Early life and education ==
Glovis Reyes was born in Don Gregorio, the son of Agapito Reyes Encarnación (Apicito), a pharmacy owner in Santo Domingo originally from Juan Barón Palenque, San Cristóbal, and Miriam Aglón Nova, a grocery owner from Don Gregorio, in 1958. Reyes studied at Liceo Francisco Gregorio Billini in Baní and at the Instituto Politécnico Loyola, in San Cristobal. After graduating from High school, Reyes went to Otto Rivera School to become a Radio announcer. He graduated from that school and worked as a radio host in San Cristobal, and at the same time started attending the Universidad Autónoma de Santo Domingo Faculty of Humanities Department of Psychology, where he later graduated with a Bachelor's Degree in Psychology.

== Political activism ==
Glovis Reyes came to Don Gregorio in 1984 to organize the Municipal Committee of the Bloque Institucional, which at that time was a group within the Dominican Revolutionary Party created to promote the presidential campaign of José Francisco Peña Gómez. An election was held to choose Bloque institutional Secretary General, which Glovis Reyes won over his opponent, Manuel Flores Familias, in June 1984. In 1985, Glovis Reyes won the election (convencion) and became president of the Dominican Revolutionary Party Municipal Committee. He held that position until his resignation in March 1990.

== Public office ==
Reyes ran for a congressional nomination for Dominican Revolutionary Party, representing Peravia Province in 1986. He did not win the party primaries, but was a candidate for a council position in Bani City Government, where he served for four years (1986–1990). Reyes also ran for congress in 1990 to no avail. He started working as an orientation adviser at the Universidad Autónoma de Santo Domingo Barahona Campus. He run for congress again in 2002 and won that elections. As a congressman, he served as a member of the International Relations Committee which helped him to travel all over the world. He run for re-election in 2006 and lost the elections. In 2009, he was chosen as the candidate for mayor of Nizao on Dominican Revolutionary Party ticket. He won this elections with huge margin against the then Nizao Mayor Lic. Salvador Gómez, who was the candidate of the other two major parties: Social Christian Reformist Party and Dominican Liberation Party.
