= Carlos Valdés =

Carlos Valdés or Valdez may refer to:

- Carlos Valdés Riesco (1904–1985), Chilean agronomist and Conservative politician
- Carlos "Patato" Valdes (1926–2007), Cuban percussionist
- Carlos Valdez (Guatemalan footballer) (born 1945), Guatemalan footballer
- Carlos Valdez (baseball) (born 1971), former Major League Baseball pitcher
- Carlos Valdez (footballer, born 1983), Uruguayan footballer
- Carlos Valdés (footballer) (born 1985), Colombian footballer
- Carlos Valdes (actor) (born 1989), Colombian-American actor and musician

== See also ==
- Carlos De Valdez (1894–1939), Peruvian film actor
