= Don Gregorio =

Don Gregorio may refer to:

- Don Gregorio, Dominican Republic, town in the Dominican Republic
- Don Gregorio (opera), by Donizetti, a revised version of L'ajo nell'imbarazzo

Nickname

- Gregorio Pérez, Uruguayan football player and manager
- Gregorio Pérez Companc, richest person in Argentina
