= Kingsley Eguakun =

American football player (born 2001)

No. 64 – Arizona Cardinals
- Position: Center
- Roster status: Active

Personal information
- Born: March 23, 2001 (age 25); Jacksonville, Florida, U.S.
- Listed height: 6 ft 3 in (1.91 m)
- Listed weight: 307 lb (139 kg)

Career information
- High school: Sandalwood (Jacksonville)
- College: Florida (2019–2023)
- NFL draft: 2024: undrafted

Career history
- Detroit Lions (2024–2025); Cleveland Browns (2025)*; New York Giants (2026)*; Arizona Cardinals (2026–present)
- * Offseason or practice squad member only

Career NFL statistics as of Week 2, 2026
- Games played: 4
- Games started: 2
- Stats at Pro Football Reference

Kingsley Eguakun (born March 23, 2001) is an American professional football center for the Arizona Cardinals of the National Football League (NFL). He played college football for the Florida Gators.

== Early life ==
Eguakun attended high school at Sandalwood. Coming out of high school, Eguakun was rated as a three-star recruit where he decided to commit to play college football for the Florida Gators.

== College career ==
In Eguakun's first season in 2019, he would redshirt and only appear in two games. During the 2020 season, Eguakun played in 12 games while making no starts. Eguakun opened the 2021 season as the Gators starting center. Eguakun finished the 2021 season by playing in and starting all 13 games for the Gators. During the 2022 season, Eguakun played in and started all 13 games for Florida. During the 2023 season, Eguakun only played in and started four games as he was limited with an ankle injury most of the season. Eguakun accepted invites to both the 2024 East-West Shrine Bowl and to the 2024 Senior Bowl. After the conclusion of the 2023 season, Eguakun decided to declare for the 2024 NFL draft.

== Professional career ==
Pre-draft measurables
Height	Weight	Arm length	Hand span	Wingspan	20-yard shuttle	Three-cone drill	Vertical jump	Broad jump	Bench press
6 ft 3 1/2 in (1.92 m)	304 lb (138 kg)	32 1/2 in (0.83 m)	10 1/8 in (0.26 m)	6 ft 8 1/4 in (2.04 m)	4.51 s	7.57 s	32.0 in (0.81 m)	9 ft 1 in (2.77 m)	26 reps
All values from NFL Combine/Pro Day

=== Detroit Lions ===
On April 29, 2024, Eguakun signed as an undrafted free agent with the Detroit Lions. He was waived on August 27, and re-signed to the practice squad. Eguakun signed a reserve/future contract with Detroit on January 20, 2025.

On October 11, 2025, Eguakun was waived by the Lions and re-signed to the practice squad three days later. He was elevated to the active roster for Weeks 16 and 17 for his first career starts at center.

=== Cleveland Browns ===
On December 31, 2025, Eguakun was signed by the Cleveland Browns off of the Lions' practice squad.

On August 30, 2026, Eguakan was waived by the Browns as a part of final roster cuts.

=== New York Giants ===
On September 1, 2026, Eguakan signed to the New York Giants' practice squad, reuniting him with his former offensive line coach, Mike Bloomgren. On September 22, Eguakan was released by the Giants.

=== Arizona Cardinals ===
On October 2, 2026, Eguakun signed with the Arizona Cardinals practice squad. On October 28, he was signed to the active roster.
