= Sandalwood High School =

Location
- 2750 John Prom Boulevard; Jacksonville, Florida 32246; United States; 30.297063°N 81.517835°W

Information
- Type: Public high school
- Motto: Best School for Success
- Established: 1971; 55 years ago
- School district: Duval County Public Schools
- Superintendent: Diana L. Greene
- CEEB code: 100787
- NCES School ID: 120048000759
- Principal: Saryn L. Hatcher
- Teaching staff: 101.00 (on an FTE basis)
- Enrollment: 2,627 (2024–2025)
- Student to teacher ratio: 26.01
- Campus: Urban
- Colors: Blue and gold
- Mascot: Saint
- Nickname: Saints
- Website: dcps.duvalschools.org/sandalwood

Sandalwood High School is a comprehensive public high school in Jacksonville, Florida. The school is one of 47 high schools in the Duval County School District. Like all Duval County schools, it is accredited through the Southern Association of Colleges and Schools. It currently has the largest school population in the district.

== History ==
Sandalwood High was built in the Sandalwood corridor of the southside of Jacksonville. It is a well-known school for its AFJROTC unit, FL-939, the Sandalwood Marching Saints, the Sandalwood Academy of Information Technology (S.A.IN.T.), AVID, the Early College program and many different athletic teams. The school opened as Sandalwood Junior-Senior High School (grades 7 through 12) on September 7, 1971. The school presently serves grades 9 through 12.

== Electives ==
Sandalwood High offers an array of extracurriculars and electives. The new Sandalwood Academy of INformation Technology (S.A.IN.T.), AVID (Advancement Via Individual Determination), Baseball, Swimming, The Sandalwood Mighty Marching Saints Band, Lacrosse, Track and Field, Junior Civitan, AFJROTC, Woodshop, Computer Science, Football, Soccer, Chorus, Culinary Arts and Drama are only some of the elective courses that are open to the students.

== Improvement ==
Sandalwood was one of 11 schools nationwide selected by the College Board for inclusion in the EXCELerator School Improvement Model program beginning the 2006-2007 school year. The project was funded by the Bill & Melinda Gates Foundation.

== Notable Awards/Recognition ==
Sandalwood's AFJROTC FL-939 Silver Eagle Drill Team has won the titles of Air Force National Drill Champions twice (2005–2006 and 2006–2007), State Champions four years in a row (2004–2005, 2005–2006, 2006–2007, and 2007–2008), and again in (2010–2011), and just recently the Southeast Regional Champions of Florida (2006–2007),(2009–2010), and (2010–2011).

The FL-939 Color Guard placed 5th and 2nd, respectively, in the National's JROTC Championships in 1998 and 1999 held in Daytona, Florida. March 20, 2010 FL-939 had won the Florida State trophy in Tampa, making it their sixth year winning the trophy, along with the Overall Drill Team and Overall Unit trophies.

In 2005, Sandalwood's award-winning marching band won Grand Champion at both the Kingdom of the Sun Festival and the Ancient City Presentation of the Bands and placed during Semi-Finals at State Competition. The Sandalwood Mighty Marching Saints have earned straight Superiors in MPA from 2015-2016 to 2021-2022 school year.

Sandalwood also won the Superintendent's Academic Challenge, also known as Brain Brawl, in 2003, defeating Stanton College Preparatory School in the Final round.

In 2014, Sandalwood was recognized as an AVID Demonstration Site. (Again in 2023)

== Sports ==
=== Football ===
The Sandalwood Saints compete in the Gateway Conference in Jacksonville, Florida. They also compete in District 1-8A of the Florida High School Athletic Association(FHSAA). Class 8A is the largest of the FHSAA divisions and regarded as one of the toughest in the nation.

One of the first major high schools on Jacksonville's rapidly growing Southside, Sandalwood experienced tremendous growth throughout the 70s and 80s. They were the first Jacksonville area team to compete in the State's largest high school football district, moving up from class 4A to 6A in just under a decade. From 1989-1999, Sandalwood competed in the 2-6A district which consisted of six teams(Tallahassee Lincoln, Lake City Columbia, Mandarin, Orange Park, Tallahassee Leon). This district alignment was the largest in Florida at the time, and highly regarded as one of the toughest high school divisions in Florida. The Saints were known for their stingy 4-4 defense and ball control Wing-T offense. While structured within this district format, Sandalwood teams had to travel three hours for some district games including contests against Tallahassee Leon High School and Lincoln High School (Tallahassee, Florida) and Lake City Columbia High School.

In an attempt to create equal competition amongst top tier schools, the FHSAA replaced Tallahassee Leon with St. Augustine High School in 1997. They also realigned teams in District 2-6A by looping Jacksonville's 6A schools into a district with Orlando schools in 2000. Yet these realignments were met with complaints from coaches of both Jacksonville and Orlando schools about the continued long travel distances for district games. After further discussions, the FHSAA in 2003 realigned Sandalwood into a two-team district (1-6A) with Orange Park High School. This again created much controversy throughout the state due to the current playoff format granting post season berths to district champions and runners-ups. With this format Sandalwood was granted playoff berths regardless of their record in 2003 and 2004.

Finally, to silence the decade long controversy amongst North Florida 6A high school teams, the 1-6A district was formed in 2005 possessing four Jacksonville area schools to compete for two playoff spots. In 2011, Sandalwood entered the newly created 1-8A District, the largest in Florida. It meant a return to the crowded six team districts which the school competed in throughout the 1990s.

Regardless of district alignment, Sandalwood has proven its ability to adapt and remain one of the top football programs in Florida. The new era of Sandalwood football features a spread offense, very different from the Wing-T of days past. But this hasn't stopped the recipe for winning as Sandalwood possesses a winning record in 14 of the last 16 seasons. They currently have 23 FHSAA playoff appearances with 12 wins and 11 losses. Updated (07/2011)

Noteworthy season

In 1995, The Sandalwood Saints varsity football team went 14-1, losing in the Class 6A Championship Game to Miami Northwestern High School 12-7. The Saints were led by a tenacious defense and the "USA Today Florida Player of the Year" and "Florida's Mr. Football" running back Frankie Franklin. Franklin was injured in the regional playoff semifinals and was limited in playoff action. The Saints were ranked No. 4 in the National USA Today Prep rankings that year before losing in the state championship game.

Other notable accomplishments include

1981 - Class 4A Regional Playoffs Quarterfinals/ 1986 - Class 5A Regional Playoffs Quarterfinals/ 1987 - Class 5A Regional Playoffs Semifinals/ 1994 - Class 6A Regional Playoffs Quarterfinals/ 1995 - Class 6A State Championship Runner-Up/ 2000 - Class 6A Regional Playoffs Quarterfinals/ 2003 - Class 6A Regional Playoffs Finals/ 2004 - Class 6A Regional Playoffs Semifinals/ 2006 - Class 6A Regional Playoffs Finals/ 2009 - Class 6A Regional Playoffs Quarterfinals/ 2010 - Class 6A Regional Playoffs Quarterfinals

=== Lacrosse ===
2007 was the Inaugural Year for both the Men's and Lady Saints Lacrosse Team.

=== Baseball ===
Playoff Accomplishments

- Regional Quarter Finals: 1998, 1999, 2000, 2002, 2003, 2009, 2010, 2011, 2012
- Regional Semi-Finals: 1979, 1980, 1983, 1984, 1987, 1988, 1989, 1998, 2003, 2009, 2010, 2011
- Regional Finals: 1979, 1980, 1983, 1984, 1987, 1988, 1989
- State Semi-Finals (Final Four): 1983, 1987, 1988, 1989
- State Finals: 1983, 1988, 1989
- State Champions: 1988

=== Swimming Pool ===
The school has an outdoor pool which is used by the athletic teams and physical education classes during the academic year. It becomes a free public pool operated by the City of Jacksonville Parks & Recreation Department during the summer months.

== Notable alumni ==
- Reuben E. Brigety, II, Dean of the Elliott School of International Affairs, former Representative of the United States of America to the African Union and Permanent Representative of the United States to the UN Economic Commission of Africa.
- Jadon Canady, college football cornerback for the Oregon Ducks
- Joel Davis, former Major League Baseball pitcher for the Chicago White Sox
- Kingsley Eguakun, NFL center for the Detroit Lions
- Hilly Hathaway, Former professional baseball player (California Angels)
- Keith Johns, Former professional baseball player (Boston Red Sox)
- Jordan Miller, NFL nose tackle for the Denver Broncos
- Chris Payton-Jones, NFL cornerback for the Tennessee Titans
- Sean Reid-Foley, Major League Baseball pitcher for New York Mets
- Desi Relaford, Former professional baseball player (Philadelphia Phillies, San Diego Padres, New York Mets, Seattle Mariners, Kansas City Royals, Colorado Rockies, Texas Rangers)
- Daryl Richardson, NFL running back
- Scott Ruskin, Former professional baseball player (Pittsburgh Pirates, Montreal Expos, Cincinnati Reds)
- Jeff Sims, college football quarterback for the Nebraska Cornhuskers
- Ameer Speed, NFL Cornerback for the New England Patriots
- DeMarcus Walker, NFL linebacker for the Chicago Bears
