= Oneil Cruz =

Dominican baseball player (born 1998)

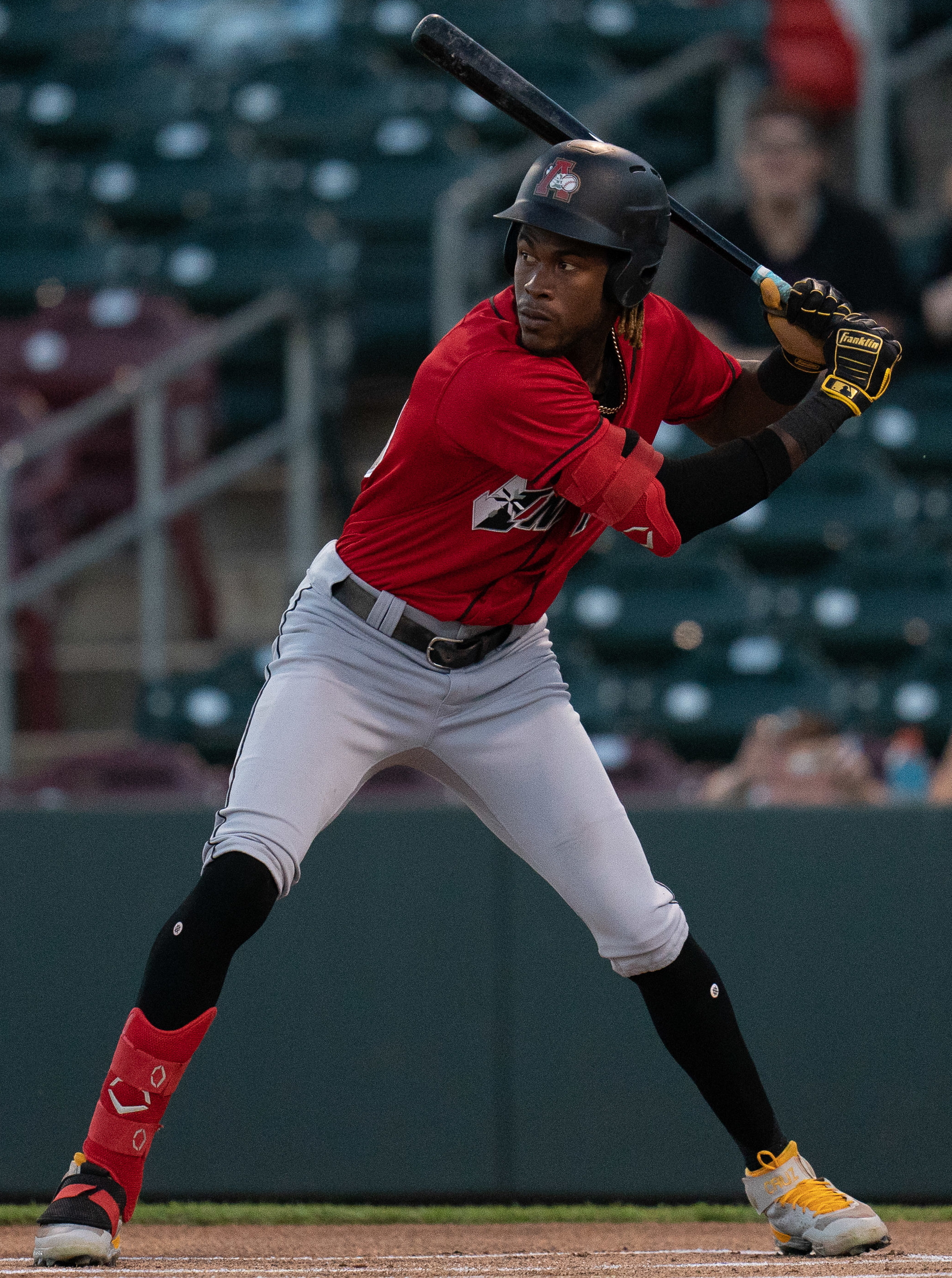
- Cruz with the Indianapolis Indians in 2021

Pittsburgh Pirates – No. 15
- Center fielder / Shortstop
- Born: October 4, 1998 (age 27); Nizao, Dominican Republic
- Bats: Left Throws: Right

MLB debut
- October 2, 2021, for the Pittsburgh Pirates

MLB statistics (through September 20, 2026)
- Batting average: .242
- Home runs: 80
- Runs batted in: 265
- Stolen bases: 101
- Stats at Baseball Reference

Teams
- Pittsburgh Pirates (2021–present)

Career highlights and awards
- NL stolen base leader (2025) (Note: Tied with Juan Soto)
Medals
Men's baseball
Representing Dominican Republic
World Baseball Classic
Bronze medal – third place	2026 Miami	Team

Oneil Cruz (born October 4, 1998) is a Dominican professional baseball center fielder and shortstop for the Pittsburgh Pirates of Major League Baseball (MLB). He made his MLB debut in 2021 and led the National League (NL) in stolen bases in 2025. He earned a bronze medal with the Dominican Republic national team at the 2026 World Baseball Classic.

== Career ==
=== Los Angeles Dodgers ===
Cruz signed with the Los Angeles Dodgers in July 2015 as an international free agent for a $950,000 signing bonus. Cruz made his professional debut in 2016 with DSL Dodgers 1, batting .294 with 23 runs batted in (RBI) in 55 games. He began the 2017 season with the Great Lakes Loons.

=== Pittsburgh Pirates ===
On July 31, 2017, the Dodgers traded Cruz and Angel German to the Pirates in exchange for Tony Watson. He was then assigned to the West Virginia Power. In 105 games between the two clubs, he slashed .237/.297/.350 with 10 home runs and 44 RBI.

In 2018, he returned to the Power, batting .286 with 14 home runs and 56 RBI in 103 games, earning South Atlantic League All-Star honors.

Cruz began 2019 at High-A level with the Bradenton Marauders, before suffering a right foot fracture on April 27. After missing two months due to the injury, he was assigned to the rookie-level Gulf Coast League Pirates on June 24. On July 28, Cruz was promoted to the Double-A Altoona Curve. He hit .298 in 73 games for the 2019 season across the three teams. After the season, he played in the Arizona Fall League, then the Pirates added Cruz to their 40-man roster to protect him from the Rule 5 draft. He did not play in a game in 2020 due to the cancellation of the Minor League Baseball season because of the COVID-19 pandemic.

Cruz split the 2021 minor league season between Altoona and the Triple-A Indianapolis Indians, hitting a combined .310/.375/.594 with 17 home runs, 47 RBI, and 19 stolen bases. On October 2, Cruz was promoted to the active roster for the first time to make his MLB debut in the last games of the season. He appeared in two major league games in the 2021 season and hit his first career home run on October 3 in Pittsburgh.

Cruz did not make the team out of spring training in 2022 and was optioned to Triple-A Indianapolis to begin the year. He was recalled for his season debut on June 20 against the Chicago Cubs, where he collected two hits, two runs, and four RBIs. On August 24, Cruz hit the then-hardest-hit ball since the advent of Statcast in 2015 against Atlanta Braves pitcher Kyle Wright. The ball was recorded at 122.4 miles per hour (197.0 km/h).

In the first month of the 2023 season, Cruz fractured his left fibula while sliding into home plate, which was blocked by Chicago White Sox catcher Seby Zavala while Cruz was attempting to score from third base on a ground ball. He was expected to miss four months, but after multiple setbacks, he was ruled out for the entire season.

In August 2024, manager Derek Shelton announced that Cruz would be moving to center field for the foreseeable future. In 2024, Cruz batted .259/.324/.449 with 21 home runs, 76 RBIs, and 22 stolen bases, and had the highest maximum exit velocity in MLB, at 121.5 mph.

Cruz hit his first career grand slam in April 2025 against the Washington Nationals in a 6–1 win. In May, Cruz hit the hardest-hit ball in the Statcast era, at 122.9 miles per hour (197.8 km/h), beating the previous record, which he set, by 0.5 miles per hour (0.80 km/h). He did this against Logan Henderson of the Milwaukee Brewers, reaching 432 feet (132 m) for a home run. Cruz participated in the MLB Home Run Derby, though he was not chosen to play in the 2025 MLB All-Star game. He advanced through the first round before being knocked out in the semifinals by Cal Raleigh. Cruz tied for the National League lead with 38 stolen bases.

On June 10, 2026, Cruz was placed on the injured list due to non-displaced fractures in his fourth and fifth metacarpals. He was transferred to the 60-day injured list on July 18. Cruz was activated from the injured list on August 17.

== Player profile ==
Cruz is unusually tall for a shortstop. He is listed as 6 feet 7 inches (2.01 m) and 215 pounds (98 kg). The only other major league player to make an appearance at shortstop as tall was 6-foot-7-inch (2.01 m) Joel Guzmán, who played nine innings for the Tampa Bay Rays in 2007. There have been four 6-foot-5-inch (1.96 m) major leaguers who started some games at shortstop — Archi Cianfrocco, Elly De La Cruz, Troy Glaus, and Michael Morse. However, the Pirates moved Cruz to center field during the 2024 season.

== Personal life ==
Cruz's father played in Minor League Baseball. The elder Cruz named his son after his favorite player, former New York Yankees outfielder Paul O'Neill. Cruz has two brothers who also played in the minors.

Cruz is married and has two children.

On September 22, 2020, Cruz was involved in a deadly vehicle crash in the Dominican Republic in which three people were killed. The accident occurred when his Jeep rear-ended a motorcycle carrying three people, who died. Cruz, who was driving under the influence of alcohol, survived the fatal incident without serious injury. Police detained Cruz at the scene, but his case was dismissed on August 30, 2021. The families of the victims received a total of $66,000 USD from Cruz.
