= Jadon Canady =

American football player (born 2003)

No. 22 – Kansas City Chiefs
- Position: Cornerback
- Roster status: Active

Personal information
- Born: May 1, 2003 (age 23)
- Listed height: 5 ft 11 in (1.80 m)
- Listed weight: 185 lb (84 kg)

Career information
- High school: Sandalwood (Jacksonville, Florida)
- College: Tulane (2021–2022); Ole Miss (2023–2024); Oregon (2025)
- NFL draft: 2026: 4th round, 109th overall pick

Career history
- Kansas City Chiefs (2026–present)

Career NFL statistics as of Week 4, 2026
- Tackles: 1
- Stats at Pro Football Reference

Jadon Jackson Canady (born May 1, 2003) is an American professional football safety for the Kansas City Chiefs of the National Football League (NFL). He played college football for the Tulane Green Wave, Ole Miss Rebels, and Oregon Ducks. Canady was selected by the Chiefs in the fourth round of the 2026 NFL draft.

== Early life ==
Canady attended Duncan U. Fletcher High School in Neptune Beach, Florida before transferring to Sandalwood High School in Jacksonville, Florida for his senior year. As a senior he had nine interceptions, which led all high school players in Florida. He committed to Tulane University to play college football.

== College career ==
Canady played two years at Tulane, recording 75 tackles and two interceptions over 20 games. After the 2022 season, he entered the transfer portal and transferred to the University of Mississippi. After playing in two games and redshirting his first year at Ole Miss in 2023, Canady started 11 of 12 games and had 38 tackles. After the season, he entered the transfer portal again and transferred to the University of Oregon.

== Professional career ==
Pre-draft measurables
Height	Weight	Arm length	Hand span	Wingspan	40-yard dash	10-yard split	20-yard split	20-yard shuttle	Vertical jump	Broad jump
5 ft 10 1/2 in (1.79 m)	181 lb (82 kg)	30 in (0.76 m)	9 1/4 in (0.23 m)	6 ft 1 3/4 in (1.87 m)	4.49 s	1.67 s	2.59 s	4.21 s	37.5 in (0.95 m)	10 ft 7 in (3.23 m)
All values from NFL Combine/Pro Day

Canady was selected by the Kansas City Chiefs in the fourth round, with the 109th overall pick, of the 2026 NFL draft.
