= Keith Johns (baseball) =

American baseball player (born 1971)

- Second baseman
- Born: July 19, 1971 (age 55); Jacksonville, Florida, U.S.
- Batted: Right Threw: Right

MLB debut
- May 23, 1998, for the Boston Red Sox

Last MLB appearance
- May 26, 1998, for the Boston Red Sox

MLB statistics
- Batting average: ---
- Runs batted in: 0
- Home runs: 0
- Stats at Baseball Reference

Teams
- Boston Red Sox (1998)

Robert Keith Johns Jr. (born July 19, 1971) is an American former Major League Baseball (MLB) infielder who played for the Boston Red Sox in 1998.

== Amateur career ==
A native of Jacksonville, Florida, Johns attended Sandalwood High School and the University of Mississippi. In 1991, he played collegiate summer baseball with the Cotuit Kettleers of the Cape Cod Baseball League.

== Professional career ==
The St. Louis Cardinals drafted Johns in the sixth round of the 1992 Major League Baseball draft. The Cardinals traded him to the Milwaukee Brewers in 1997, and the Brewers sent him to the Baltimore Orioles a few months later. In turn, the Orioles traded him to the Boston Red Sox in March 1998, where he finally made his major league debut as a pinch hitter for Jim Leyritz. In his only major league plate appearance, he collected a walk.

Johns played in the minor leagues from 1992 to 2000 for the farm teams of the Cardinals, Brewers, Orioles, Red Sox, Anaheim Angels, and Chicago Cubs. In nine minor league seasons, Johns hit .249 with 27 home runs while stealing 106 bases. He played at least ten games at each of the four infield positions and six in the outfield.

== Personal ==
Johns is married to his college sweetheart, Karri (Monschein) Johns (1996). They have two children, Kathleene Carroll Johns (2001) and Robert Keith Johns III (2005).
