= Ameer Speed =

American football player (born 1999)

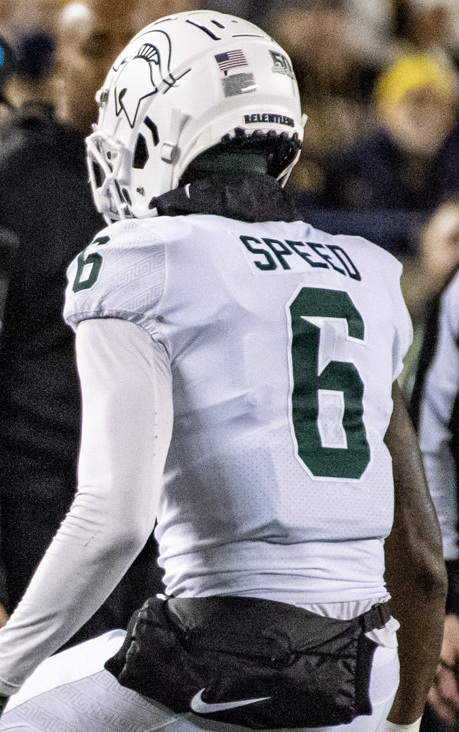
- Speed with Michigan State in 2022

No. 23 – Dallas Cowboys
- Position: Cornerback
- Roster status: Active

Personal information
- Born: October 11, 1999 (age 27); Jacksonville, Florida, U.S.
- Listed height: 6 ft 3 in (1.91 m)
- Listed weight: 215 lb (98 kg)

Career information
- High school: Sandalwood (Jacksonville)
- College: Georgia (2017–2021); Michigan State (2022)
- NFL draft: 2023: 6th round, 214th overall pick

Career history
- New England Patriots (2023); Indianapolis Colts (2023–2024); Chicago Bears (2024); Cleveland Browns (2025)*; Houston Texans (2025); Houston Gamblers (2026); Dallas Cowboys (2026–present)
- * Offseason or practice squad member only

Awards and highlights
- CFP national champion (2021)

Career NFL statistics as of Week 3, 2026
- Total tackles: 11
- Stats at Pro Football Reference

Ameer Lashon Speed (born October 11, 1999) is an American professional football cornerback for the Dallas Cowboys of the National Football League (NFL). He played college football for the Georgia Bulldogs and Michigan State Spartans. He was selected by the New England Patriots in the sixth round of the 2023 NFL draft.

== Professional career ==
Pre-draft measurables
Height	Weight	Arm length	Hand span	Wingspan	40-yard dash	10-yard split	20-yard split	20-yard shuttle	Three-cone drill	Vertical jump	Broad jump	Bench press
6 ft 3 1/2 in (1.92 m)	210 lb (95 kg)	32 5/8 in (0.83 m)	8 5/8 in (0.22 m)	6 ft 6 3/4 in (2.00 m)	4.34 s	1.56 s	2.55 s	4.26 s	6.99 s	32.5 in (0.83 m)	10 ft 3 in (3.12 m)	14 reps
All values from Pro Day

=== New England Patriots ===
Speed was selected by the New England Patriots in the sixth round, 214th overall, of the 2023 NFL draft. He was waived on October 19, 2023.

=== Indianapolis Colts ===
On October 20, 2023, Speed was claimed off waivers by the Indianapolis Colts.

Speed was waived by the Colts on August 27, 2024, and re-signed to the practice squad. He was released on September 17.

=== Chicago Bears ===
On September 25, 2024, Speed was signed to the Chicago Bears practice squad. He was promoted to the active roster on November 6.

On April 8, 2025, Speed signed his exclusive rights free agent contract with the Bears. On August 11, he was waived with an injury designation.

=== Cleveland Browns ===
On September 30, 2025, Speed signed with the Cleveland Browns' practice squad. He was released on October 9 with an injury settlement.

=== Houston Texans ===
On November 24, 2025, Speed signed with the Houston Texans' practice squad. On December 3, he was signed to the active roster. In two appearances for Houston, he recorded two combined tackles. Speed was waived by the Texans on December 26 and re-signed to the practice squad three days later.

=== Houston Gamblers ===
On April 28, 2026, Speed signed with the Houston Gamblers of the United Football League (UFL).

=== Dallas Cowboys ===
On June 16, 2026, Speed was signed by the Dallas Cowboys of the National Football League (NFL).
