= Marino Santana =

Dominican baseball player (born 1972)

- Pitcher
- Born: May 10, 1972 (age 54); San Jose Los Llanos, Dominican Republic
- Batted: Right Threw: Right

MLB debut
- September 4, 1998, for the Detroit Tigers

Last MLB appearance
- July 23, 1999, for the Boston Red Sox

MLB statistics
- Win–loss record: 0–0
- Earned run average: 7.94
- Strikeouts: 14
- Stats at Baseball Reference

Teams
- Detroit Tigers (1998); Boston Red Sox (1999)

Marino Santana Castro (born May 10, 1972) is a Dominican former professional baseball pitcher. He played parts of two seasons in Major League Baseball (MLB). Santana was 26 years old when he made his major-league debut on September 4, 1998, with the Detroit Tigers. Santana also played for the Boston Red Sox. He accumulated 11 1/3 innings pitched in the major leagues.
