= Will Brunson =

American baseball player (1970–2019)

- Pitcher
- Born: March 20, 1970; Irving, Texas, U.S.
- Died: November 23, 2019 (aged 49); Big Bend National Park, Texas, U.S.
- Batted: Left Threw: Left

MLB debut
- June 21, 1998, for the Los Angeles Dodgers

Last MLB appearance
- July 9, 1999, for the Detroit Tigers

MLB statistics
- Win–loss record: 1–1
- Earned run average: 5.71
- Strikeouts: 11
- Stats at Baseball Reference

Teams
- Los Angeles Dodgers (1998); Detroit Tigers (1998–1999)

William Donald Brunson (March 20, 1970 – November 23, 2019) was an American Major League Baseball (MLB) pitcher for the Los Angeles Dodgers and Detroit Tigers. He pitched in 27 games during the 1998 and 1999 seasons.

He died on November 23, 2019, after suffering a heart attack while hiking at Big Bend National Park.

== Early life ==
Will Brunson was born in Irving, Texas on March 20, 1970. Brunson went to school at DeSoto High School and would afterwards attend Eastfield College and Texas State University.
