= Dean Crow =

American baseball player (born 1972)

- Pitcher
- Born: August 21, 1972 (age 53); Garland, Texas, U.S.
- Batted: Right Threw: Right

MLB debut
- May 29, 1998, for the Detroit Tigers

Last MLB appearance
- September 21, 1998, for the Detroit Tigers

MLB statistics
- Win–loss record: 2–2
- Earned run average: 3.94
- Strikeouts: 18
- Stats at Baseball Reference

Teams
- Detroit Tigers (1998)

Paul Dean Crow (born August 21, 1972) is an American former Major League Baseball (MLB) pitcher. Crow played for the Detroit Tigers in 1998.

== Career ==
Crow attended Stratford High School in Houston, Texas, and played collegiate baseball at the University of Miami. He was a 10th round selection of the Seattle Mariners in the 1993 MLB draft.
