= Tom Fordham =

American baseball player (born 1974)

- Pitcher
- Born: February 20, 1974 (age 51); San Diego, California
- Batted: Left Threw: Left

MLB debut
- August 19, 1997, for the Chicago White Sox

Last MLB appearance
- August 30, 1998, for the Chicago White Sox

MLB statistics
- Win–loss record: 1–3
- Earned run average: 6.61
- Strikeouts: 33
- Stats at Baseball Reference

Teams
- Chicago White Sox (1997–1998)

Thomas James Fordham (born February 20, 1974) is an American former professional baseball pitcher. He played during two seasons at the Major League Baseball for the Chicago White Sox. He was drafted by the White Sox in the 11th round of the 1993 MLB draft. Fordham played his first professional season with their Rookie league GCL White Sox in 1993. He made his major league debut in 1997. He was called upon once again in 1998. Following a poor performance in 1999, Fordham was signed by the Milwaukee Brewers. He pitched in their Triple-A (Indianapolis Indians) team in 2000 and in 2001.

He missed the 2002 season due to injury.

He split his last season between the Pittsburgh Pirates' Double-A (Altoona Curve) and their Triple-A (Nashville Sounds) teams.
