= Mike Heathcott =

American baseball player (born 1969)

- Pitcher
- Born: May 16, 1969 (age 55); Chicago, Illinois
- Batted: Right Threw: Right

MLB debut
- August 28, 1998, for the Chicago White Sox

Last MLB appearance
- August 28, 1998, for the Chicago White Sox

MLB statistics
- Win–loss record: 0–0
- Earned run average: 3.00
- Strikeouts: 3
- Stats at Baseball Reference

Teams
- Chicago White Sox (1998)

Michael Joseph Heathcott (born May 16, 1969) is an American former professional baseball pitcher. He played during one season at the Major League Baseball for the Chicago White Sox. He was drafted by the White Sox in the 13th round of the 1991 Major League Baseball draft. Heathcott played his first professional season with their Class-A (Short Season) Utica Blue Sox in 1991, and his last with the Triple-A affiliates of the Chicago Cubs (Iowa Cubs) and the Los Angeles Angels of Anaheim (Edmonton Trappers) in 2000.
