= Rafael Valdez =

Dominican baseball player (born 1967)

- Pitcher
- Born: December 17, 1967 (age 58); Nizao, Dominican Republic
- Batted: Right Threw: Right

MLB debut
- April 18, 1990, for the San Diego Padres

Last MLB appearance
- April 27, 1990, for the San Diego Padres

MLB statistics
- Win–loss record: 0–1
- Earned run average: 11.12
- Strikeouts: 3

CPBL statistics
- Win–loss record: 1–4
- Earned run average: 5.85
- Strikeouts: 27
- Stats at Baseball Reference

Teams
- San Diego Padres (1990); Mercuries Tigers (1993)

Rafael Emilio Valdez Díaz (born December 17, 1967) is a Dominican former Major League Baseball (MLB) pitcher. He played for the San Diego Padres in 1990.

== Career ==
Valdez began his professional career as a shortstop, playing two seasons at that position with the Charleston Rainbows in 1986–87. He converted to pitching in 1988. In 1989, Valdez pitched a perfect game for the Riverside Red Wave.

After his major league career, Valdez continued to pitch in minor league baseball until 2003, when he played for the Allentown Ambassadors of the Northeast League.
