= Roberto Durán (baseball) =

Dominican baseball player (born 1973)

Roberto Duran
- Pitcher
- Born: March 6, 1973 (age 52); Moca, Dominican Republic
- Batted: Left Threw: Left

MLB debut
- July 6, 1997, for the Detroit Tigers

Last MLB appearance
- May 5, 1998, for the Detroit Tigers

MLB statistics
- Win–loss record: 0–1
- Earned run average: 6.58
- Strikeouts: 23
- Stats at Baseball Reference

Teams
- Detroit Tigers (1997–1998)

Roberto Alejandro Durán (born March 6, 1973) is a Dominican former professional baseball pitcher who played for the Detroit Tigers of Major League Baseball (MLB) in 1997 and 1998. He batted and threw left-handed.

== Career ==
Durán was signed by the Los Angeles Dodgers in 1990 as an amateur free agent. He played in the Dominican Republic for two seasons, then began playing in the United States in Minor League Baseball in 1992. He played in the Dodgers' farm system through the 1995 season.

On March 14, 1996, Durán was selected off waivers by the Toronto Blue Jays. He never made it to the majors with the Jays and ended up being traded on December 11, 1996, to the Detroit Tigers in exchange for minor-leaguer Anton French. In Detroit, Durán made his first major league appearance on July 6, 1997. He finished the year having appeared in 13 games, and holding a 7.59 ERA through 10 2/3 innings pitched.

In 1998, at the age of 25, Durán appeared in 18 games for the Tigers. He lost one game and had a 5.87 ERA through 15 1/3 innings. After that season, on January 1, 1999, the Montreal Expos claimed him off of waivers, but he did not play again in the major leagues. He ended his major-league career with an 0–1 record, a 6.58 ERA, and 23 strikeouts.

Durán last played in the minor leagues in 1999, for three different Montreal farm teams; after not playing professionally in 2000, he played briefly in the Mexican League in 2001, his final professional season.
