= Todd Rizzo =

American baseball player (born 1971)

- Pitcher
- Born: May 24, 1971 (age 55); Clifton Heights, Pennsylvania
- Batted: Right Threw: Left

MLB debut
- April 2, 1998, for the Chicago White Sox

Last MLB appearance
- July 18, 1999, for the Chicago White Sox

MLB statistics
- Win–loss record: 0–2
- Earned run average: 12.38
- Strikeouts: 5

CPBL statistics
- Win–loss record: 1–1
- Earned run average: 7.15
- Strikeouts: 4
- Stats at Baseball Reference

Teams
- Chicago White Sox (1998–1999); Uni-President Lions (2004)

Todd Michael Rizzo (born May 24, 1971) is an American former professional baseball pitcher. He played during two seasons at the Major League Baseball (MLB) for the Chicago White Sox. He was signed by the Los Angeles Dodgers as an amateur free agent 1992. Rizzo played his first professional season with their Rookie league Gulf Coast Dodgers and Class A (Short Season) Yakima Bears in 1992, and his last with the Camden Riversharks of the independent Atlantic League in 2006. He played his last affiliated season for the Baltimore Orioles' Double-A Bowie Baysox and Triple-A Ottawa Lynx in 2003.
