= Darío Veras =

Dominican baseball player (born 1973)

- Relief pitcher
- Born: March 13, 1973 (age 52); Villa Vasquez, Dominican Republic
- Batted: Right Threw: Right

MLB debut
- July 31, 1996, for the San Diego Padres

Last MLB appearance
- September 21, 1998, for the Boston Red Sox

MLB statistics
- Win–loss record: 5–3
- Earned run average: 4.67
- Strikeouts: 46

KBO statistics
- Win–loss record: 1–4
- Earned run average: 7.33
- Strikeouts: 19

CPBL statistics
- Win–loss record: 14–9
- Earned run average: 1.89
- Strikeouts: 200
- Stats at Baseball Reference

Teams
- San Diego Padres (1996–1997); Boston Red Sox (1998); Hyundai Unicorns (2002); Chinatrust Whales (2004–2006)
Medals
Representing Dominican Republic
Men's Baseball
Central American and Caribbean Games
Gold medal – first place	2010 Mayagüez	Team

Darío Antonio Veras (born March 13, 1973) is a Dominican former Major League Baseball player. A pitcher, Veras played for the San Diego Padres (1996 and 1997) and Boston Red Sox (1998). Veras attempted a comeback with the Los Angeles Dodgers in 2007, but ultimately was cut from the team during spring training. Veras signed with the Vaqueros Laguna of the Mexican League and played for them during the 2010 season.
