= Mandy Romero =

American baseball player (born 1967)

- Catcher
- Born: October 29, 1967 (age 58); Miami, Florida, U.S.
- Batted: Switch Threw: Right

MLB debut
- July 15, 1997, for the San Diego Padres

Last MLB appearance
- August 24, 2003, for the Colorado Rockies

MLB statistics
- Batting average: .208
- Home runs: 2
- Runs batted in: 5
- Stats at Baseball Reference

Teams
- San Diego Padres (1997–1998); Boston Red Sox (1998); Colorado Rockies (2003)

Armando "Mandy" Romero (born October 29, 1967) is an American former professional baseball catcher. He played in Major League Baseball (MLB) for the San Diego Padres, Boston Red Sox, and Colorado Rockies.

Drafted by the Pittsburgh Pirates in the 19th round of the 1988 MLB amateur draft, Romero would make his Major League Baseball debut with the San Diego Padres on July 15, 1997, and appear in his final game in 2003.

Romero was a replacement player in spring training in 1995 during the baseball strike. Replacement players took over when the Major League Baseball Players Association (MLBPA) went on strike. The strike was resolved at the end of spring training. Romero would return to Major League Baseball with the San Diego Padres in 1997. However, he was not permitted to join the MLBPA.

Pedro Martínez, Red Sox teammate of Romero, was quoted, "Mandy is a guy that likes to take life by the horns. He lives, he laughs, and most of all, he loves."
