= Carlos Reyes (baseball) =

American baseball player (born 1969)

- Pitcher
- Born: April 4, 1969 (age 57); Miami, Florida
- Batted: Both Threw: Right

MLB debut
- April 7, 1994, for the Oakland Athletics

Last MLB appearance
- September 26, 2003, for the Tampa Bay Devil Rays

MLB statistics
- Win–loss record: 20–36
- Earned run average: 4.66
- Strikeouts: 360
- Stats at Baseball Reference

Teams
- Oakland Athletics (1994–1997); San Diego Padres (1998); Boston Red Sox (1998); San Diego Padres (1999); Philadelphia Phillies (2000); San Diego Padres (2000); Tampa Bay Devil Rays (2003)

Carlos Alberto Reyes Jr. (born April 4, 1969) is a former professional baseball pitcher. He pitched all or parts of eight seasons in Major League Baseball between 1994 and 2003.
