= Bryan Ward =

American baseball player (born 1972)

- Pitcher
- Born: January 28, 1972 (age 54); Bristol, Pennsylvania, U.S.
- Batted: Left Threw: Left

MLB debut
- July 3, 1998, for the Chicago White Sox

Last MLB appearance
- September 30, 2000, for the Anaheim Angels

MLB statistics
- Win–loss record: 1–3
- Earned run average: 5.09
- Strikeouts: 66
- Stats at Baseball Reference

Teams
- Chicago White Sox (1998–1999); Philadelphia Phillies (2000); Anaheim Angels (2000)

Bryan Matthew Ward (born January 28, 1972) is an American former Major League Baseball pitcher. Ward played for the Chicago White Sox, Philadelphia Phillies, and the Anaheim Angels from 1998 to 2000. He batted and threw left-handed.

== Career ==
Bryan Ward graduated in 1991 from Rancocas Valley Regional High School in Mount Holly, New Jersey. He played for the USC Aiken Pacers in the 1993 season before being drafted by the Florida Marlins in the 20th round of the 1993 amateur draft.
