= Don Gregorio, Dominican Republic =

Town in the Dominican Republic

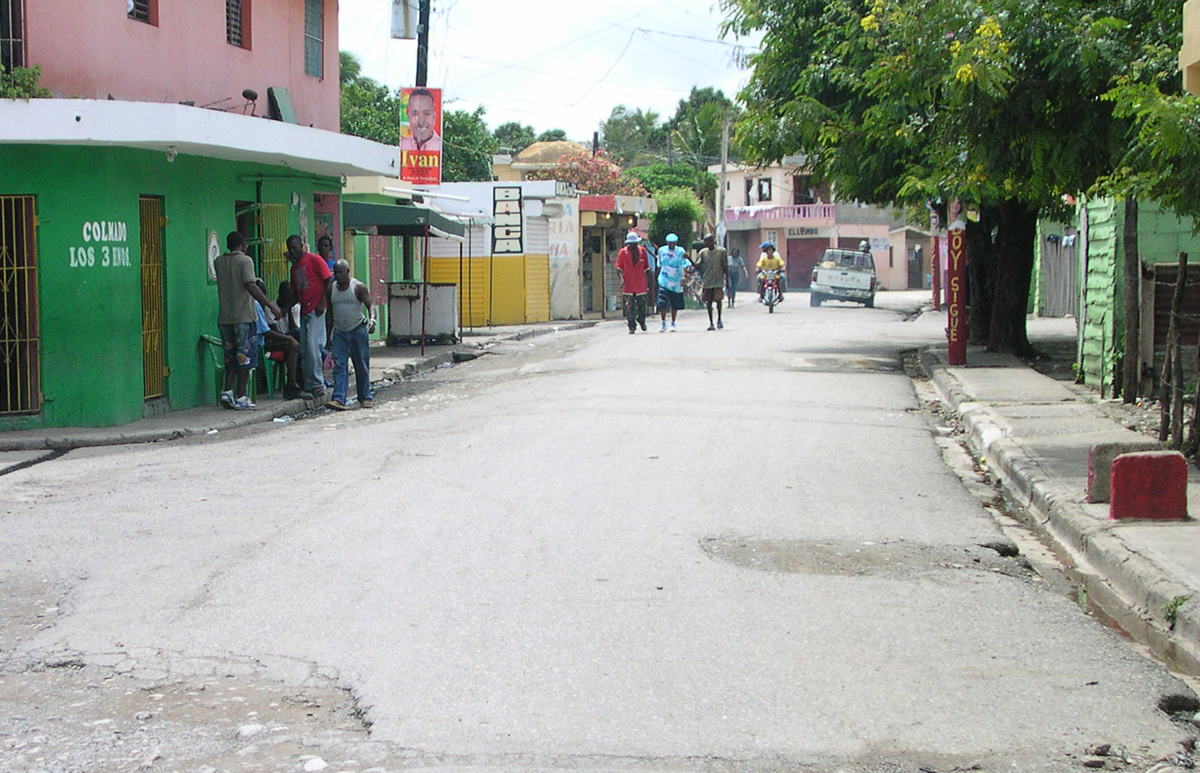
Don Gregorio

Don Gregorio is a town in Nizao County, located in the southeastern corner of Dominican Republic, at 18°13′53″N 70°11′58″W. It is the second most populated town in the Nizao County of the Peravia Province, in the estuary of the Nizao River. Don Gregorio was elevated to municipal section on January 1, 1945, when Nizao was elevated from Municipal District to the category of County by the Dominican Congress.

Don Gregorio is an agricultural town rich in cultivable lands and a huge producer of baseball players. Hall of famer Vladimir Guerrero, Wilton Guerrero, and Jesus Sánchez are dongregorienses who have played in Major League Baseball in the United States.

Don Gregorio is also the home of the first congressman representing Nizao County on the Dominican Republic Chamber of Deputies (representatives), Lic. Glovis Reyes Aglón. Don Gregorio also has provided two of the four mayors that have been elected in the young county of Nizao.
