= Carlos Valdez (baseball) =

Dominican baseball player (born 1971)

- Pitcher
- Born: December 26, 1971 (age 54); Baní, Dominican Republic
- Batted: Right Threw: Right

Professional debut
- MLB: July 18, 1995, for the San Francisco Giants
- NPB: April 6, 1999, for the Kintetsu Buffaloes

Last appearance
- MLB: September 27, 1998, for the Boston Red Sox
- NPB: August 29, 1999, for the Kintetsu Buffaloes

MLB statistics
- Win–loss record: 1–1
- Earned run average: 5.00
- Strikeouts: 11

NPB statistics
- Win–loss record: 3–3
- Earned run average: 4.84
- Strikeouts: 35
- Stats at Baseball Reference

Teams
- San Francisco Giants (1995); Boston Red Sox (1998); Kintetsu Buffaloes (1999)

Carlos Luis Lorenzo Valdez (born December 26, 1971) is a Dominican former middle relief pitcher in Major League Baseball who played in part of two seasons for the San Francisco Giants (1995) and Boston Red Sox (1998). He also played in Japan for the Kintetsu Buffaloes (1999). Listed at 5' 11", 191 lb., he batted and threw right-handed. His older brother, Efrain Valdez, also pitched in the major leagues.

In 15 relief appearances, Valdez had a 1–1 record with a 5.00 ERA without saves, giving up 10 runs on 20 hits and 13 walks while striking out 11 in 18.0 innings of work.

Valdez also played in the Giants and Red Sox minor league systems (1991–98), posting a 35–37 mark with 4.07 ERA and 16 saves in 267 games.
