= 2000 Toronto Blue Jays season =

2000 Toronto Blue Jays
- League: American League
- Division: East
- Ballpark: SkyDome
- City: Toronto
- Record: 83–79 (.512)
- Divisional place: 3rd
- Owners: Rogers Communications, Interbrew
- General managers: Gord Ash
- Managers: Jim Fregosi
- Television: CBC Television (Brian Williams, Rich Waltz, John Cerutti); The Sports Network (Dan Shulman, Buck Martinez); CTV Sportsnet (Rod Black, Joe Carter)
- Radio: CHUM (AM) (Jerry Howarth, Tom Cheek, Gary Matthews)

The 2000 Toronto Blue Jays season was the franchise's 24th season of Major League Baseball. It resulted in the Blue Jays finishing third in the American League East with a record of 83 wins and 79 losses. It was the team's first season with new mascots Ace and Diamond.

== Transactions ==
Transactions by the Toronto Blue Jays during the off-season before the 2000 season.

=== October 1999 ===
October 5	Norberto Martin granted free agency (signed with Milwaukee Brewers to a contract on December 1, 1999).
October 7	Rob Butler granted free agency.
October 15	Alex Delgado granted free agency. Willie Greene granted free agency (signed with Chicago Cubs to a one-year, $395,000 contract on January 19, 2000). Chris Jones granted free agency (signed with San Diego Padres to a contract on February 27, 2000). Adam Melhuse granted free agency (signed with Los Angeles Dodgers to a contract on December 15, 1999).
October 20	Jacob Brumfield granted free agency (signed with Toronto Blue Jays to a one-year contract on December 7, 1999)d. Released John Hudek.
October 29	Graeme Lloyd granted free agency (signed with Montreal Expos to a three-year, $9 million contract on December 20, 1999). David Segui granted free agency (signed with Toronto Blue Jays to a one-year, $4.325 million contract on January 18, 2000).

=== November 1999 ===
November 3	Brian McRae granted free agency.
November 5	Tony Fernández granted free agency (signed with Seibu Lions of the NPB to a one-year contract).
November 8	Acquired Pedro Borbón Jr. and Raúl Mondesí from the Los Angeles Dodgers for Shawn Green and Jorge Núñez.
November 10	Signed free agent Charlie Greene from the Milwaukee Brewers to a one-year contract.
November 11	Pat Borders granted free agency (signed with the Tampa Bay Devil Rays to a contract on January 27, 2000). Acquired Alberto Castillo, Matt DeWitt and Lance Painter from the St. Louis Cardinals for Pat Hentgen and Paul Spoljaric.
November 12	Signed free agent Darwin Cubillán from the New York Yankees to a contract.
November 16	Released Mike Matheny.
November 17	Signed free agent Chad Mottola from the Chicago White Sox to a contract.

=== December 1999 ===
December 7	Re-signed free agent Jacob Brumfield to a one-year contract. Re-signed Willis Otáñez to a one-year contract.
December 10	Re-signed Carlos Delgado to a three-year, $36 million contract.
December 13	Jim Mann drafted by the New York Mets in the 1999 MLB Rule 5 draft. Brian Smith drafted by the Pittsburgh Pirates in the 1999 MLB Rule 5 draft. Drafted DeWayne Wise from the Cincinnati Reds in the 1999 MLB Rule 5 draft.
December 21	Signed free agent Frank Castillo from the Pittsburgh Pirates to a one-year, $375,000 contract.

=== January 2000 ===
January 4	Re-signed Tony Batista to a four-year, $16 million contract.
January 6	Signed free agent Robert Ellis from the Houston Astros to a contract.
January 18	Re-signed free agent David Segui to a one-year, $4.325 contract.
January 19	Re-signed Homer Bush to a three-year, $7.3 million contract.

=== February 2000 ===
February 16	Signed free agent Eric Gunderson from the Texas Rangers to a one-year contract.

=== March 2000 ===
March 14	Signed free agent Robert Pérez from the Orix BlueWave of the NPB to a one-year contract.
March 16	As part of three-team trade, acquired Brad Fullmer from the Montreal Expos. Traded David Segui and cash to the Texas Rangers. In addition, Montreal Expos acquired Lee Stevens from the Texas Rangers.
March 22	Jim Mann returned by the New York Mets. Acquired Jerson Perez from the New York Mets for Jim Mann.
March 26	Signed free agent Glenn Williams from the Atlanta Braves to a contract.
March 27	Signed free agent Marty Cordova from the Boston Red Sox to a one-year, $500,000 contract.
March 28	Nerio Rodríguez selected off of waivers by the New York Mets.
March 29	Anthony Sanders selected off of waivers by the Seattle Mariners.

== Regular season ==
=== Season standings ===
AL East
Team	W	L	Pct.	GB	Home	Road
New York Yankees	87	74	.540	—	44‍–‍36	43‍–‍38
Boston Red Sox	85	77	.525	2½	42‍–‍39	43‍–‍38
Toronto Blue Jays	83	79	.512	4½	45‍–‍36	38‍–‍43
Baltimore Orioles	74	88	.457	13½	44‍–‍37	30‍–‍51
Tampa Bay Devil Rays	69	92	.429	18	36‍–‍44	33‍–‍48

=== Record vs. opponents ===
2000 American League record Source: MLB Standings Grid – 2000
Team	ANA	BAL	BOS	CWS	CLE	DET	KC	MIN	NYY	OAK	SEA	TB	TEX	TOR	NL
Anaheim	—	7–5	5–4	4–6	3–6	5–5	6–6	7–3	5–5	5–8	5–8	6–6	7–5	5–7	12–6
Baltimore	5–7	—	5–7	4–6	5–4	6–4	3–7	6–3	5–7	4–8	3–7	8–5	6–6	7–6	7–11
Boston	4–5	7–5	—	7–5	6–6	7–5	4–6	8–2	6–7	5–5	5–5	6–6	7–3	4–8	9–9
Chicago	6–4	6–4	5–7	—	8–5	9–3	5–7	7–5	8–4	6–3	7–5	6–4	5–5	5–5	12–6
Cleveland	6–3	4–5	6–6	5–8	—	6–7	5–7	5–8	5–5	6–6	7–2	8–2	6–4	8–4	13–5
Detroit	5–5	4–6	5–7	3–9	7–6	—	5–7	7–6	8–4	6–4	7–2	4–5	5–5	3–9	10–8
Kansas City	6–6	7–3	6–4	7–5	7–5	7–5	—	7–5	2–8	4–8	4–8	5–5	3–7	4–6	8–10
Minnesota	3–7	3–6	2–8	5–7	8–5	6–7	5–7	—	5–5	5–7	3–9	4–6	8–4	5–4	7–11
New York	5–5	7–5	7–6	4–8	5–5	4–8	8–2	5–5	—	6–3	4–6	6–6	10–2	5–7	11–6
Oakland	8–5	8–4	5–5	3–6	6–6	4–6	8–4	7–5	3–6	—	9–4	7–2	5–7	7–3	11–7
Seattle	8–5	7–3	5–5	5–7	2–7	2–7	8–4	9–3	6–4	4–9	—	9–3	7–5	8–2	11–7
Tampa Bay	6–6	5–8	6–6	4–6	2–8	5–4	5–5	6–4	6–6	2–7	3–9	—	5–7	5–7	9–9
Texas	5–7	6–6	3–7	5–5	4–6	5–5	7–3	4–8	2–10	7–5	5–7	7–5	—	4–6	7–11
Toronto	7–5	6–7	8–4	5–5	4–8	9–3	6–4	4–5	7–5	3–7	2–8	7–5	6–4	—	9–9

=== Transactions ===
Transactions for the Toronto Blue Jays during the 2000 regular season.

==== April 2000 ====
April 10	Signed free agent Todd Greene of the Anaheim Angels to a contract.
April 28	Released Mark Dalesandro.

==== May 2000 ====
May 23	Released Robert Ellis. Casey Blake selected off of waivers by the Minnesota Twins.

==== June 2000 ====
June 12	Acquired Francisco Álvarez from the Minnesota Twins for Mike Romano.

==== July 2000 ====
July 19	Acquired Esteban Loaiza from the Texas Rangers for Darwin Cubillán and Michael Young.
July 25	Acquired Alvin Morrow from the Milwaukee Brewers for Kevin Brown.
July 26	Sent Eric Gunderson to San Francisco Giants as part of a conditional deal. Acquired Rob Ducey from the Philadelphia Phillies for a player to be named later (John Sneed on July 31, 2000).
July 28	Released Brendan Donnelly.
July 31	Acquired Mark Guthrie and Steve Trachsel from the Tampa Bay Devil Rays for Brent Abernathy.

==== August 2000 ====
August 4	Acquired Dave Martinez from the Texas Rangers for a player to be named later (Pete Munro on August 8, 2000).
August 5	Acquired Mickey Morandini from the Philadelphia Phillies for a player to be named later (Rob Ducey on August 7, 2000).

=== 2000 draft picks ===
The 2000 MLB draft was held in June 2000.

Round	Pick	Player	Position	College/School	Nationality
1	18	Miguel Negron	OF	Manuela Toro High School (Caguas, PR)	(Puerto Rico)
1s	33	Dustin McGowan	RHP	Long County High School	(United States)
2	45	Peter Bauer	RHP	University of South Carolina	(United States)
2	58	Dominic Rich	2B	Auburn University	(United States)
3	88	Morrin Davis	OF	Hillsborough High School	(United States)
4	118	Raul Tablado	SS	Miami Southridge High School	(United States)
5	148	Mike Smith	RHP	University of Richmond	(United States)
6	178	Rich Thompson	OF	James Madison University	(United States)
7	208	Aaron Sisk	3B	University of New Mexico	(United States)
8	238	David Abbott	RHP	University of Arizona	(United States)
9	268	Nom Siriveaw	3B	Oklahoma State University	(Thailand)
10	298	Jerrod Payne	RHP	University of North Florida	(United States)

=== Roster ===
2000 Toronto Blue Jays
Roster
Pitchers: 34 Clayton Andrews; 49 John Bale; 36 Pedro Borbón Jr.; 26 Chris Carpenter; 30 Frank Castillo; 53 Pasqual Coco; 34 Darwin Cubillán; 40 Matt DeWitt; 47 Kelvim Escobar; 66 Leo Estrella; 52 John Frascatore; 39 Eric Gunderson; 38 Mark Guthrie; 32 Roy Halladay; 50 Joey Hamilton; 44 Billy Koch; 21 Esteban Loaiza; 13 Peter Munro; 40 Lance Painter; 48 Paul Quantrill; 46 Steve Trachsel; 33 David Wells	Catchers: 30 Alberto Castillo; 9 Darrin Fletcher; 21 Charlie Greene; 27 Todd Greene; 17 Josh Phelps; Infielders: 7 Tony Batista; 18 Homer Bush; 25 Carlos Delgado; 20 Brad Fullmer; 8 Alex Gonzalez; 4 Craig Grebeck; 1 Mickey Morandini; 31 Chris Woodward	Outfielders: 15 Marty Cordova; 23 José Cruz Jr.; 22 Rob Ducey; 14 Dave Martinez; 43 Raúl Mondesí; 22 Chad Mottola; 24 Shannon Stewart; 16 Andy Thompson; 10 Vernon Wells; 55 DeWayne Wise	Manager: 11 Jim Fregosi; Coaches: 35 Terry Bevington (third base); 56 Roly de Armas (bullpen); 3 Lee Elia (bench); 41 Cito Gaston (hitting); 29 Bobby Knoop (first base); 22 Rick Langford (pitching); 45 Dave Stewart (pitching)

=== Game log ===
2000 Game Log
April: 12–14 (Home: 7–7; Away: 5–7)

#	Date	Opponent	Score	Win	Loss	Save	Attendance	Record
1	April 3	Royals	5–4	Koch (1–0)	Spradlin (0–1)		40,898	1–0
2	April 4	Royals	6–3	Halladay (1–0)	Witasick (0–1)	Koch (1)	13,514	2–0
3	April 5	Royals	4–3	Rosado (1–0)	Carpenter (0–1)	Bottalico (1)	14,957	2–1
4	April 6	Royals	9–3	Durbin (1–0)	Escobar (0–1)	Rigby (1)	14,336	2–2
5	April 7	@ Rangers	11–5	Clark (1–0)	Castillo (0–1)		31,619	2–3
6	April 8	@ Rangers	4–0	Wells (1–0)	Rogers (1–1)		37,128	3–3
7	April 9	@ Rangers	7–5	Helling (1–0)	Halladay (1–1)		40,186	3–4
8	April 10	@ Angels	6–0	Schoeneweis (2–0)	Carpenter (0–2)		14,338	3–5
9	April 11	@ Angels	5–4	Ortiz (1–0)	Escobar (0–2)	Percival (2)	15,229	3–6
10	April 12	@ Angels	6–2	Borbón (1–0)	Petkovsek (0–1)		16,494	4–6
11	April 14	Mariners	11–9	Moyer (2–1)	Wells (1–1)		17,306	4–7
12	April 15	Mariners	17–6	Rodriguez (1–0)	Halladay (1–2)	Paniagua (1)	21,754	4–8
13	April 16	Mariners	19–7	García (2–1)	Carpenter (0–3)		15,325	4–9
14	April 17	Angels	7–1	Escobar (1–2)	Ortiz (1–1)		13,622	5–9
15	April 18	Angels	16–10	Dickson (2–0)	Castillo (0–2)		13,825	5–10
16	April 19	Angels	12–4	Wells (2–1)	Hill (1–3)		13,572	6–10
17	April 20	Angels	12–11	Halladay (2–2)	Bottenfield (1–2)	Koch (2)	13,985	7–10
18	April 21	Yankees	8–3	Carpenter (1–3)	Mendoza (2–1)		25,921	8–10
19	April 22	Yankees	8–2	Escobar (2–2)	Cone (0–2)		30,167	9–10
20	April 23	Yankees	10–7	Hernández (4–0)	Andrews (0–1)	Rivera (6)	20,485	9–11
21	April 24	@ Athletics	3–2	Wells (3–1)	Appier (3–2)	Koch (3)	8,363	10–11
22	April 25	@ Athletics	11–2	Hudson (2–2)	Halladay (2–3)		8,266	10–12
23	April 26	@ Athletics	4–2	Carpenter (2–3)	Olivares (1–3)	Koch (4)	14,477	11–12
24	April 28	@ Yankees	6–0	Cone (1–2)	Escobar (2–3)		35,987	11–13
25	April 29	@ Yankees	6–2	Wells (4–1)	Hernández (4–1)	Koch (5)	38,783	12–13
26	April 30	@ Yankees	7–1	Clemens (2–2)	Halladay (2–4)		43,721	12–14

May: 16–12 (Home: 8–8; Away: 8–4)

#	Date	Opponent	Score	Win	Loss	Save	Attendance	Record
27	May 1	@ White Sox	5–3	Carpenter (3–3)	Wells (2–3)	Koch (6)	14,448	13–14
28	May 2	@ White Sox	4–1	Castillo (1–2)	Wunsch (0–1)	Koch (7)	10,397	14–14
29	May 3	@ White Sox	7–3	Baldwin (5–0)	Escobar (2–4)	Foulke (4)	12,026	14–15
30	May 4	Indians	8–1	Wells (5–1)	Finley (3–1)		16,637	15–15
31	May 5	Indians	11–10	Koch (2–0)	Shuey (1–1)		19,191	16–15
32	May 6	Indians	8–6	Rincón (1–0)	Quantrill (0–1)	Karsay (5)	23,730	16–16
33	May 7	Indians	10–8 (12)	Shuey (2–1)	Gunderson (0–1)	Karsay (6)	19,161	16–17
34	May 8	Orioles	6–5	Escobar (3–4)	Johnson (0–2)	Koch (8)	15,103	17–17
35	May 9	Orioles	6–4	Wells (6–1)	Mussina (1–4)	Koch (9)	15,177	18–17
36	May 10	Orioles	7–2	Painter (1–0)	Erickson (0–1)	Quantrill (1)	15,598	19–17
37	May 12	@ Devil Rays	4–3	White (1–2)	Carpenter (3–4)	Lopez (2)	17,532	19–18
38	May 13	@ Devil Rays	8–4	Escobar (4–4)	Lidle (0–1)		20,054	20–18
39	May 14	@ Devil Rays	3–2	Wells (7–1)	Lopez (2–3)		15,788	21–18
40	May 15	Red Sox	8–1	Schourek (2–3)	Castillo (1–3)		16,124	21–19
41	May 16	Red Sox	7–6	Munro (1–0)	Lowe (2–1)		17,663	22–19
42	May 17	Red Sox	8–0	Martínez (7–1)	Carpenter (3–5)		20,078	22–20
43	May 19	White Sox	5–3	Sirotka (3–3)	Escobar (4–5)	Foulke (6)	18,268	22–21
44	May 20	White Sox	6–2	Baldwin (7–0)	Wells (7–2)		20,091	22–22
45	May 21	White Sox	2–1	Eldred (4–2)	Castillo (1–4)	Foulke (7)	18,264	22–23
46	May 22	White Sox	4–3	Koch (3–0)	Howry (0–1)		19,167	23–23
47	May 23	@ Red Sox	3–2	Carpenter (4–5)	Martínez (7–2)	Koch (10)	33,402	24–23
48	May 24	@ Red Sox	6–3 (11)	Cormier (2–0)	Frascatore (0–1)		31,250	24–24
49	May 25	@ Red Sox	11–6	Wells (8–2)	Schourek (2–4)		32,716	25–24
50	May 26	@ Tigers	8–2	Frascatore (1–1)	Brocail (1–3)		33,068	26–24
51	May 27	@ Tigers	4–3	Brocail (2–3)	Quantrill (0–2)		29,584	26–25
52	May 28	@ Tigers	12–7	Andrews (1–1)	Blair (2–1)		29,105	27–25
53	May 30	Twins	4–1	Redman (4–0)	Escobar (4–6)	Hawkins (2)	16,371	27–26
54	May 31	Twins	4–2	Wells (9–2)	Radke (3–6)	Koch (11)	17,305	28–26

June: 16–10 (Home: 7–3; Away: 9–7)

#	Date	Opponent	Score	Win	Loss	Save	Attendance	Record
55	June 1	Twins	5–1	Milton (5–1)	Castillo (1–5)		30,444	28–27
56	June 2	@ Marlins	11–10	Bones (1–0)	Munro (1–1)	Alfonseca (16)	12,209	28–28
57	June 3	@ Marlins	2–1	Looper (1–1)	Koch (3–1)	Alfonseca (17)	17,546	28–29
58	June 4	@ Marlins	7–2	Escobar (5–6)	Núñez (0–6)		11,007	29–29
59	June 5	@ Braves	9–3	Wells (10–2)	Burkett (4–3)		33,641	30–29
60	June 6	@ Braves	7–6	Remlinger (2–1)	Frascatore (1–2)		39,454	30–30
61	June 7	@ Braves	12–8	Cubillán (1–0)	Millwood (4–5)	Koch (12)	33,240	31–30
62	June 9	Expos	13–3	Carpenter (5–5)	Tucker (0–1)		26,122	32–30
63	June 10	Expos	11–2	Armas (2–3)	Escobar (5–7)		30,239	32–31
64	June 11	Expos	8–3	Koch (4–1)	Mota (0–1)		25,838	33–31
65	June 12	@ Tigers	4–2	Castillo (2–5)	Nomo (2–6)	Koch (13)	21,779	34–31
66	June 13	@ Tigers	16–3	Blair (3–1)	Andrews (1–2)		23,314	34–32
67	June 14	@ Tigers	8–1	Carpenter (6–5)	Weaver (3–6)		27,479	35–32
68	June 16	@ Red Sox	7–4	Pichardo (2–0)	Escobar (5–8)	Lowe (16)	33,638	35–33
69	June 17	@ Red Sox	11–10	Wells (11–2)	Martínez (5–4)	Koch (14)	32,951	36–33
70	June 18	@ Red Sox	5–1	Castillo (3–5)	Fassero (6–3)	Koch (15)	32,925	37–33
71	June 20	Tigers	18–6	Weaver (4–6)	Carpenter (6–6)		18,850	37–34
72	June 21	Tigers	6–0	Escobar (6–8)	Moehler (4–4)		18,125	38–34
73	June 22	Tigers	7–4	Wells (12–2)	Nomo (2–7)		20,259	39–34
74	June 23	Red Sox	5–4	Castillo (4–5)	Wasdin (0–3)	Koch (16)	28,198	40–34
75	June 24	Red Sox	6–4	Halladay (3–4)	Rose (3–5)	Koch (17)	30,130	41–34
76	June 25	Red Sox	6–5 (13)	DeWitt (1–0)	Florie (0–2)		31,022	42–34
77	June 27	@ Devil Rays	11–1	Trachsel (6–7)	Escobar (6–9)		14,657	42–35
78	June 28	@ Devil Rays	5–2	Wells (13–2)	Yan (4–6)		15,308	43–35
79	June 29	@ Devil Rays	12–3	Castillo (5–5)	Lidle (1–3)		21,666	44–35
80	June 30	@ Orioles	8–3	Rapp (5–5)	Halladay (3–5)		40,412	44–36

July: 11–16 (Home: 6–7; Away: 5–9)

#	Date	Opponent	Score	Win	Loss	Save	Attendance	Record
81	July 1	@ Orioles	12–5	Ponson (5–4)	Carpenter (6–7)		40,876	44–37
82	July 2	@ Orioles	3–2	Trombley (4–2)	Quantrill (0–3)	Mills (1)	41,267	44–38
83	July 3	@ Orioles	6–4	Wells (14–2)	Johnson (0–7)	Koch (18)	39,617	45–38
84	July 4	@ Indians	9–4	Colón (8–5)	Frascatore (1–3)		43,222	45–39
85	July 5	@ Indians	15–7	Brewington (2–0)	Quantrill (0–4)		43,141	45–40
86	July 6	@ Indians	9–6	Carpenter (7–7)	Burba (8–4)	Koch (19)	43,237	46–40
87	July 7	@ Expos	10–5	Lira (2–0)	Quantrill (0–5)		13,317	46–41
88	July 8	@ Expos	6–3	Wells (15–2)	Armas (4–6)	Koch (20)	17,420	47–41
89	July 9	@ Expos	13–3	Castillo (6–5)	Hermanson (6–7)		22,489	48–41
90	July 13	Phillies	8–5	Schilling (5–5)	Carpenter (7–8)	Brantley (14)	22,163	48–42
91	July 14	Phillies	3–2	Koch (5–1)	Brantley (1–3)		21,385	49–42
92	July 15	Phillies	7–3	Chen (5–0)	Wells (15–3)		24,828	49–43
93	July 16	Mets	7–3	Halladay (4–5)	Leiter (10–3)	Koch (21)	30,139	50–43
94	July 17	Mets	7–5 (11)	Franco (4–3)	Borbón (1–1)	Benítez (21)	23,129	50–44
95	July 18	Mets	11–7	Jones (4–4)	Carpenter (7–9)		24,633	50–45
96	July 19	Devil Rays	5–2	Escobar (7–9)	Lopez (6–7)	Koch (22)	18,751	51–45
97	July 20	Devil Rays	6–5	Quantrill (1–5)	White (3–6)	Koch (23)	18,915	52–45
98	July 21	Orioles	9–5	Rapp (6–6)	Halladay (4–6)		23,470	52–46
99	July 22	Orioles	8–2	Mercedes (5–4)	Loaiza (5–7)		27,585	52–47
100	July 23	Orioles	4–1	Castillo (7–5)	Mussina (6–10)	Koch (24)	26,276	53–47
101	July 25	Indians	10–3	Finley (9–7)	Escobar (7–10)		28,672	53–48
102	July 26	Indians	8–1	Wells (16–3)	Colón (9–8)		31,183	54–48
103	July 27	@ Mariners	7–2	Loaiza (6–7)	Rhodes (3–5)		40,398	55–48
104	July 28	@ Mariners	7–4	García (3–1)	Carpenter (7–10)	Sasaki (25)	37,126	55–49
105	July 29	@ Mariners	6–5 (13)	Tomko (5–3)	Halladay (4–7)		45,264	55–50
106	July 30	@ Mariners	10–6	Sele (12–6)	Escobar (7–11)	Paniagua (2)	43,648	55–51
107	July 31	@ Athletics	6–1	Hudson (12–3)	Wells (16–4)		13,608	55–52

August: 15–11 (Home: 8–3; Away: 7–8)

#	Date	Opponent	Score	Win	Loss	Save	Attendance	Record
108	August 1	@ Athletics	3–1 (10)	Isringhausen (5–3)	Koch (5–2)		17,469	55–53
109	August 2	@ Athletics	5–4	Mecir (8–2)	Guthrie (1–2)	Isringhausen (24)	26,473	55–54
110	August 3	Rangers	3–1	Castillo (8–5)	Rogers (10–9)	Koch (25)	24,825	56–54
111	August 4	Rangers	10–8	Quantrill (2–5)	Venafro (1–1)	Koch (26)	23,518	57–54
112	August 5	Rangers	8–5	Wells (17–4)	Davis (4–3)	Koch (27)	26,143	58–54
113	August 6	Rangers	11–6	Glynn (3–1)	Escobar (7–12)		28,780	58–55
114	August 7	@ Royals	8–7	Stein (3–3)	Loaiza (6–8)	Bottalico (12)	17,533	58–56
115	August 8	@ Royals	6–1	Castillo (9–5)	Suzuki (5–7)		14,086	59–56
116	August 9	@ Royals	5–3	Suppan (6–6)	Trachsel (6–11)	Larkin (1)	14,198	59–57
117	August 10	@ Royals	15–7	Carpenter (8–10)	Fussell (4–3)		18,188	60–57
118	August 11	@ Twins	9–4	Romero (2–1)	Escobar (7–13)		13,360	60–58
119	August 12	@ Twins	6–3	Redman (11–5)	Loaiza (6–9)	Hawkins (8)	30,161	60–59
120	August 13	@ Twins	13–3	Carpenter (9–10)	Radke (8–13)		25,656	61–59
121	August 15	Angels	8–4	Wise (1–1)	Wells (17–5)		26,706	61–60
122	August 16	Angels	8–6	Koch (6–2)	Pote (1–1)		32,497	62–60
123	August 18	Twins	3–2	Loaiza (7–9)	Kinney (0–1)	Koch (28)	23,074	63–60
124	August 19	Twins	5–1	Radke (9–13)	Guthrie (1–3)	Guardado (8)	25,171	63–61
125	August 20	Twins	6–3	Wells (18–5)	Carrasco (3–3)		32,627	64–61
126	August 22	Royals	7–5	Escobar (8–13)	Santiago (6–4)	Koch (29)	22,551	65–61
127	August 23	Royals	9–8	Escobar (9–13)	Larkin (0–2)	Koch (30)	22,616	66–61
128	August 25	@ Rangers	1–0 (11)	Venafro (2–1)	Koch (6–3)		35,365	66–62
129	August 26	@ Rangers	9–3	Hamilton (1–0)	Sikorski (1–2)	Borbón (1)	39,388	67–62
130	August 27	@ Rangers	6–4	Trachsel (7–11)	Helling (14–9)	Koch (31)	21,896	68–62
131	August 28	@ Angels	4–2	Loaiza (8–9)	Ortiz (4–5)	Koch (32)	17,483	69–62
132	August 29	@ Angels	9–4	Holtz (2–3)	Carpenter (9–11)		17,773	69–63
133	August 30	@ Angels	11–2	Wells (19–5)	Wise (3–2)		19,653	70–63

September: 13–15 (Home: 9–8; Away: 4–7)

#	Date	Opponent	Score	Win	Loss	Save	Attendance	Record
134	September 1	Athletics	4–3	Frascatore (2–3)	Jones (3–2)		22,187	71–63
135	September 2	Athletics	8–0	Heredia (14–9)	Trachsel (7–12)	Mecir (3)	26,261	71–64
136	September 3	Athletics	4–3	Hudson (15–6)	Loaiza (8–10)	Mecir (4)	24,156	71–65
137	September 4	Athletics	10–0	Zito (3–3)	Wells (19–6)		21,824	71–66
138	September 5	Mariners	4–3	Rhodes (4–7)	Escobar (9–14)	Sasaki (32)	21,128	71–67
139	September 6	Mariners	7–3	Hamilton (2–0)	Halama (11–8)		17,055	72–67
140	September 7	Mariners	8–1	García (6–4)	Trachsel (7–13)		17,571	72–68
141	September 8	Tigers	3–0	Loaiza (9–10)	Weaver (9–13)		19,121	73–68
142	September 9	Tigers	6–5	Koch (7–3)	Nitkowski (4–9)		23,623	74–68
143	September 10	Tigers	6–2	Carpenter (10–11)	Sparks (6–4)	Escobar (1)	21,666	75–68
144	September 12	@ Yankees	10–2	Neagle (7–4)	Hamilton (2–1)		30,370	75–69
145	September 13	@ Yankees	3–2	Clemens (13–6)	Loaiza (9–11)	Rivera (34)	29,083	75–70
146	September 14	@ Yankees	3–2 (11)	Koch (8–3)	Choate (0–1)	Escobar (2)	35,040	76–70
147	September 15	@ White Sox	6–5	Escobar (10–14)	Garland (3–7)	Koch (33)	23,105	77–70
148	September 16	@ White Sox	6–3	Wunsch (6–3)	Escobar (10–15)	Foulke (31)	33,204	77–71
149	September 17	@ White Sox	14–1	Painter (2–0)	Wells (5–9)		26,113	78–71
150	September 19	Yankees	16–3	Trachsel (8–13)	Pettitte (18–8)		28,908	79–71
151	September 20	Yankees	7–2	Loaiza (10–11)	Cone (4–13)		28,463	80–71
152	September 21	Yankees	3–1	Wells (20–6)	Hernández (12–12)		30,074	81–71
153	September 22	Devil Rays	3–2	Lidle (3–6)	Frascatore (2–4)	Hernández (30)	18,063	81–72
154	September 23	Devil Rays	7–6	Koch (9–3)	Enders (0–1)		24,473	82–72
155	September 24	Devil Rays	6–0	Harper (1–2)	Trachsel (8–14)		28,172	82–73
156	September 25	Devil Rays	5–1	Wilson (1–4)	Loaiza (10–12)	Hernández (31)	20,715	82–74
157	September 26	@ Orioles	2–1	Mercedes (13–7)	Wells (20–7)	Kohlmeier (13)	31,614	82–75
158	September 27	@ Orioles	4–0	Castillo (10–5)	Ponson (9–13)		30,362	83–75
159	September 28	@ Orioles	23–1	Rapp (9–12)	Carpenter (10–12)		32,203	83–76
160	September 29	@ Indians	8–4	Speier (5–2)	Trachsel (8–15)	Karsay (20)	42,768	83–77
161	September 30	@ Indians	6–5	Finley (16–11)	Loaiza (10–13)	Wickman (14)	42,676	83–78

October: 0–1 (Home: 0–0; Away: 0–1)

#	Date	Opponent	Score	Win	Loss	Save	Attendance	Record
162	October 1	@ Indians	11–4	Woodard (3–3)	Wells (20–8)		42,594	83–79

== Player stats ==
= Indicates team leader

=== Batting ===
==== Starters by position ====
Note: Pos = Position; G = Games played; AB = At bats; R = Runs; H = Hits; HR = Home runs; RBI = Runs batted in; Avg. = Batting average; TB = Total bases

Pos	Player	G	AB	R	H	HR	RBI	Avg.	TB
C	Darrin Fletcher	122	416	43	133	20	58	.320	214
1B	Carlos Delgado	162	569	115	196	41	137	.344	378
2B	Homer Bush	76	297	38	64	1	18	.215	75
SS	Alex Gonzalez	141	527	68	133	15	69	.252	213
3B	Tony Batista	154	620	96	163	41	114	.263	322
LF	Shannon Stewart	136	583	107	186	21	69	.319	302
CF	José Cruz Jr.	162	603	91	146	31	76	.242	281
RF	Raúl Mondesí	96	388	78	105	24	67	.271	203
DH	Brad Fullmer	133	482	76	142	32	104	.295	269

==== Other batters ====
Note: G = Games played; AB = At bats; R = Runs; H = Hits; HR = Home runs; RBI = Runs batted in; Avg. = Batting average; TB = Total bases

Player	G	AB	R	H	HR	RBI	Avg.	TB
Craig Grebeck	66	241	38	71	3	23	.295	99
Marty Cordova	62	200	23	49	4	18	.245	68
Alberto Castillo	66	185	14	39	1	16	.211	49
Dave Martinez	47	180	29	56	2	22	.311	74
Mickey Morandini	35	107	10	29	0	7	.271	33
Chris Woodward	37	104	16	19	3	14	.183	35
Todd Greene	34	85	11	20	5	10	.235	37
DeWayne Wise	28	22	3	3	0	0	.136	3
Rob Ducey	5	13	2	2	0	1	. 154	3
Chad Mottola	3	9	1	2	0	2	.222	2
Charlie Greene	3	9	0	1	0	0	.111	1
Andy Thompson	2	6	2	1	0	1	.167	1
Vernon Wells	3	2	0	0	0	0	.000	0
Josh Phelps	1	1	0	0	0	0	.000	0

=== Pitching ===
= Indicates league leader

==== Starting pitchers ====
Note: G = Games pitched; IP = Innings pitched; W = Wins; L = Losses; ERA = Earned run average; SO = Strikeouts

Player	G	IP	W	L	ERA	SO
David Wells	35	229.2	20*	8	4.11	166
Chris Carpenter	34	175.1	10	12	6.26	113
Frank Castillo	25	138.0	10	5	3.59	104
Esteban Loaiza	14	92.0	5	7	3.62	62
Steve Trachsel	11	63.0	2	5	5.29	32
Joey Hamilton	6	33.0	2	1	3.55	15
Pasqual Coco	1	4.0	0	0	9.00	2

- Tied with Tim Hudson (Oakland) for league lead

==== Other pitchers ====
Note: G = Games pitched; IP = Innings pitched; W = Wins; L = Losses; ERA = Earned run average; SO = Strikeouts

Player	G	IP	W	L	ERA	SO
Kelvim Escobar	43	180.0	10	15	5.35	142
Roy Halladay	19	67.2	4	7	10.64	44
Peter Munro	9	25.2	1	1	5.96	16
Clayton Andrews	8	20.2	1	2	10.02	12

==== Relief pitchers ====
Note: G = Games pitched; W = Wins; L = Losses; SV = Saves; ERA = Earned run average; SO = Strikeouts

Player	G	W	L	SV	ERA	SO
Billy Koch	68	9	3	33	2.63	60
Paul Quantrill	68	2	5	1	4.52	47
John Frascatore	60	2	4	0	5.42	30
Pedro Borbón Jr.	59	1	1	1	6.48	29
Lance Painter	42	2	0	0	4.73	53
Mark Guthrie	23	0	2	0	4.79	20
Matt DeWitt	8	1	0	0	8.56	6
Darwin Cubillán	7	1	0	0	8.04	14
Eric Gunderson	6	0	1	0	7.11	2
Leo Estrella	2	0	0	0	5.79	3
John Bale	2	0	0	0	14.73	6

== Award winners ==
- Carlos Delgado, Hank Aaron Award
- Carlos Delgado, Silver Slugger Award
- Carlos Delgado, The Sporting News Player of the Year Award

All-Star Game

- David Wells, P, starter
- Carlos Delgado, 1B, reserve
- Tony Batista, 3B, reserve

== Farm system ==
Level	Team	League	Manager
AAA	Syracuse SkyChiefs	International League	Pat Kelly and Mel Queen
AA	Tennessee Smokies	Southern League	Rocket Wheeler
A	Dunedin Blue Jays	Florida State League	Marty Pevey
A	Hagerstown Suns	South Atlantic League	Rolando Pino
A-Short Season	Queens Kings	New York–Penn League	Eddie Rodríguez
Rookie	Medicine Hat Blue Jays	Pioneer League	Paul Elliott
