= 1999 Toronto Blue Jays season =

1999 Toronto Blue Jays
- League: American League
- Division: East
- Ballpark: SkyDome
- City: Toronto
- Record: 84–78 (.519)
- Divisional place: 3rd
- Owners: Interbrew, Canadian Imperial Bank of Commerce
- General managers: Gord Ash
- Managers: Jim Fregosi
- Television: CBC Television (Brian Williams, John Cerutti); The Sports Network (Dan Shulman, Buck Martinez); CTV Sportsnet (Rod Black, Joe Carter)
- Radio: CHUM (AM) (Jerry Howarth, Tom Cheek)

The 1999 Toronto Blue Jays season was the franchise's 23rd season of Major League Baseball. It resulted in the Blue Jays finishing third in the American League East with a record of 84 wins and 78 losses. The team set a franchise record for most runs scored in a season (883) and hits in a season (1,580). The previous Blue Jays records for most runs scored and most hits in a season were set in 1993 when the Jays scored 847 runs and collected 1,556 hits. Conversely, the Blue Jays pitching staff gave up the most runs of any Blue Jays team since 1979. It was the team's final season with original mascot BJ Birdy.

== Transactions ==
Transactions by the Toronto Blue Jays during the off-season before the 1999 season.

=== October 1998 ===
October 15	Ben Van Ryn granted free agency.
October 16	Alex Delgado granted free agency (signed with Toronto Blue Jays to a one-year contract on November 18, 1998). José Herrera granted free agency (signed with Baltimore Orioles to a contract on January 2, 1999).
October 22	José Canseco granted free agency (signed with Tampa Bay Devil Rays to a two-year, $5.025 million contract on December 11, 1998).
October 23	Craig Grebeck granted free agency (signed with Toronto Blue Jays to a two-year, $1.35 million contract on October 27, 1998). Benito Santiago granted free agency (signed with Chicago Cubs to a one-year, $1.5 million contract on December 9, 1998).
October 26	Dave Stieb granted free agency (signed with Toronto Blue Jays to a one-year contract on December 7, 1998).
October 27	Re-signed free agent Craig Grebeck to a two-year, $1.35 million contract.

=== November 1998 ===
November 5	Juan Samuel granted free agency.
November 18	Re-signed free agent Alex Delgado to a one-year contract. Released Shannon Withem.

=== December 1998 ===
December 7	Re-signed free agent Dave Stieb to a one-year contract.
December 12	Acquired Joey Hamilton from the San Diego Padres for Woody Williams, Carlos Almanzar and Pete Tucci.
December 14	Signed free agent Gerónimo Berroa from the Detroit Tigers to a one-year, $500,000 contract. Acquired Eric Ludwick from the Detroit Tigers for Beiker Graterol.
December 16	Signed free agent Walt McKeel from the Boston Red Sox to a contract.
December 23	Signed free agent Rob Butler from the Houston Astros to a one-year, $275,000 contract. Signed free agent Mike Matheny from the Milwaukee Brewers to a one-year, $600,000 contract.

=== January 1999 ===
January 6	Signed free agent Wayne Kirby from the New York Mets to a contract.
January 11	Signed amateur free agent Francisco Rosario to a contract.
January 18	Signed free agent Joey Cora from the Cleveland Indians to a contract.
January 19	Signed free agent Willie Greene from the Baltimore Orioles to a one-year, $1 million contract. Signed free agent Vicente Palacios to a contract.

=== February 1999 ===
February 9	Released Patrick Lennon.
February 18	Acquired David Wells, Homer Bush and Graeme Lloyd from the New York Yankees for Roger Clemens.
February 28	Re-signed free agent Patrick Lennon to a one-year contract.

=== March 1999 ===
March 14	Signed free agent Norberto Martín from the Anaheim Angels to a one-year contract.
March 17	Released Felipe Crespo.
March 21	Released Vicente Palacios.
March 30	Acquired Dave Hollins and cash from the Anaheim Angels for Tomás Pérez.

== Regular season ==
=== Season standings ===
AL East
Team	W	L	Pct.	GB	Home	Road
New York Yankees	98	64	.605	—	48‍–‍33	50‍–‍31
Boston Red Sox	94	68	.580	4	49‍–‍32	45‍–‍36
Toronto Blue Jays	84	78	.519	14	40‍–‍41	44‍–‍37
Baltimore Orioles	78	84	.481	20	41‍–‍40	37‍–‍44
Tampa Bay Devil Rays	69	93	.426	29	33‍–‍48	36‍–‍45

=== Record vs. opponents ===
1999 American League record Source: MLB Standings Grid – 1999
Team	ANA	BAL	BOS	CWS	CLE	DET	KC	MIN	NYY	OAK	SEA	TB	TEX	TOR	NL
Anaheim	—	3–9	1–9	5–5	1–9	5–5	7–5	6–4	6–4	8–4	6–6	7–5	6–6	3–9	6–12
Baltimore	9–3	—	5–7	7–3	1–9	5–5	6–4	8–1	4–9	5–7	5–5	5–7	6–6	1–11	11–7
Boston	9–1	7–5	—	7–5	8–4	7–5	8–2	6–4	8–4	4–6	7–3	4–9	4–5	9–3	6–12
Chicago	5–5	3–7	5–7	—	3–9	7–5	6–6	8–3–1	5–7	3–7	4–8	6–4	5–5	6–4	9–9
Cleveland	9–1	9–1	4–8	9–3	—	8–5	7–5	9–3	3–7	10–2	7–3	5–4	3–7	5–7	9–9
Detroit	5–5	5–5	5–7	5–7	5–8	—	7–4	6–6	5–7	4–6	3–7	4–5	5–5	2–10	8–10
Kansas City	5–7	4–6	2–8	6–6	5–7	4–7	—	5–8	5–4	6–6	7–5	2–8	4–6	3–7	6–12
Minnesota	4–6	1–8	4–6	3–8–1	3–9	6–6	8–5	—	4–6	7–5	4–8	5–5	0–12	4–6	10–7
New York	4–6	9–4	4–8	7–5	7–3	7–5	4–5	6–4	—	6–4	9–1	8–4	8–4	10–2	9–9
Oakland	4–8	7–5	6–4	7–3	2–10	6–4	6–6	5–7	4–6	—	6–6	9–1	5–7	8–2	12–6
Seattle	6–6	5–5	3–7	8–4	3–7	7–3	5–7	8–4	1–9	6–6	—	8–4	5–8	7–2	7–11
Tampa Bay	5–7	7–5	9–4	4–6	4–5	5–4	8–2	5–5	4–8	1–9	4–8	—	4–8	5–8	4–14
Texas	6–6	6–6	5–4	5–5	7–3	5–5	6–4	12–0	4–8	7–5	8–5	8–4	—	6–4	10–8
Toronto	9–3	11–1	3–9	4–6	7–5	10–2	7–3	6–4	2–10	2–8	2–7	8–5	4–6	—	9–9

=== Transactions ===
Transactions for the Toronto Blue Jays during the 1999 regular season.

==== April 1999 ====
April 1	Signed free agent Doug Bochtler from the Los Angeles Dodgers to a one-year contract. Released Walt McKeel.
April 2	Released Adam Melhuse. Tom Evans selected off of waivers by the Texas Rangers.
April 5	Signed free agent Chris Jones from the San Diego Padres to a one-year contract. Re-signed free agent Adam Melhuse to a one-year contract.
April 15	Signed free agent Pat Kelly from the St. Louis Cardinals to a one-year contract.
April 16	Returned Eric Ludwick to the Florida Marlins.

==== May 1999 ====
May 5	Acquired Paul Spoljaric from the Philadelphia Phillies for Robert Person.
May 7	Selected Jacob Brumfield off of waivers from the Los Angeles Dodgers.
May 19	Player rights of Doug Bochtler sold to the Los Angeles Dodgers.
May 28	Selected Willis Otáñez off of waivers from the Baltimore Orioles.

==== June 1999 ====
June 9	Released Patrick Lennon. Released Pat Kelly.
June 12	Acquired Tony Batista and John Frascatore from the Arizona Diamondbacks for Dan Plesac.
June 21	Released Dave Hollins.

==== July 1999 ====
July 3	Signed amateur free agent Davis Romero to a contract.
July 8	Acquired Juan Melo from the San Diego Padres for Isabel Giron.
July 28	Acquired David Segui from the Seattle Mariners for Tom Davey and Steve Sinclair.
July 31	Signed free agent John Hudek from the Atlanta Braves to a contract.

==== August 1999 ====
August 6	Selected Curtis Goodwin off of waivers from the Chicago Cubs.
August 7	Signed amateur free agent Kevin Cash to a contract.
August 9	Acquired Brian McRae from the Colorado Rockies for a player to be named later (Pat Lynch on August 23, 1999).
August 26	Signed free agent Brendan Donnelly from the Pittsburgh Pirates to a contract.
August 30	Released Gerónimo Berroa.
August 31	Signed free agent Pat Borders from the Cleveland Indians to a one-year contract.

==== September 1999 ====
September 3	Traded Juan Melo to the Cincinnati Reds for a player to be named later (Jaime Goudie on September 13, 1999).

=== Roster ===
1999 Toronto Blue Jays
Roster
Pitchers: 49 John Bale; 26 Chris Carpenter; 43 Tom Davey; 47 Kelvim Escobar; 52 John Frascatore; 51 Gary Glover; 32 Roy Halladay; 50 Joey Hamilton; 41 Pat Hentgen; 43 John Hudek; 44 Billy Koch; 37 Graeme Lloyd; 40 Eric Ludwick; 69,13 Peter Munro; 31 Robert Person; 19 Dan Plesac; 48 Paul Quantrill; 39 Nerio Rodríguez; 46 Mike Romano; 46 Steve Sinclair; 40 Paul Spoljaric; 33 David Wells	Catchers: 29,10 Pat Borders; 14 Kevin Brown; 5 Mark Dalesandro; 9 Darrin Fletcher; 22,11 Mike Matheny; Infielders: 7 Tony Batista; 28 Casey Blake; 18 Homer Bush; 25 Carlos Delgado; 1 Tony Fernández; 8 Alex Gonzalez; 4 Craig Grebeck; 12 Willie Greene; 7 Pat Kelly; 38,3 Norberto Martin; 21 Willis Otañez; 19 David Segui; 31 Chris Woodward	Outfielders: 2 Jacob Brumfield; 29 Gerónimo Berroa; 20 Rob Butler; 23 José Cruz Jr.; 17 Curtis Goodwin; 15 Shawn Green; 20 Patrick Lennon; 56 Brian McRae; 27 Anthony Sanders; 24 Shannon Stewart; 3 Vernon Wells; Other batters: 17 Dave Hollins; 6 Kevin Witt	Manager: 11 Jim Fregosi; Coaches: 35 Terry Bevington (Third Base); 10 Jim Lett (Bench); 36 Gary Matthews (Hitting); 16 Lloyd Moseby (First Base); 34 Mel Queen (Pitching); 30 Marty Pevey (Bullpen)

=== Game log ===
1999 Game Log
April: 13–11 (Home: 9–1; Away: 4–10)

#	Date	Opponent	Score	Win	Loss	Save	Attendance	Record
1	April 6	@ Twins	6–1	Radke (1–0)	Hentgen (0–1)		45,601	0–1
2	April 7	@ Twins	9–3	Wells (1–0)	Lincoln (0–1)	Halladay (1)	9,220	1–1
3	April 8	@ Twins	11–9	Trombley (1–0)	Hamilton (0–1)	Aguilera (1)	9,431	1–2
4	April 9	@ Orioles	7–4	Escobar (1–0)	Ponson (0–1)		36,430	2–2
5	April 10	@ Orioles	1–0	Mussina (2–0)	Carpenter (0–1)	Timlin (2)	43,700	2–3
6	April 11	@ Orioles	9–5	Halladay (1–0)	Orosco (0–1)		40,273	3–3
7	April 12	Devil Rays	7–1	Wells (2–0)	Saunders (1–1)		37,160	4–3
8	April 13	Devil Rays	8–5	White (1–0)	Hamilton (0–2)	Hernández (3)	23,710	4–4
9	April 14	Devil Rays	7–6 (11)	Lloyd (1–0)	Lopez (0–1)		23,847	5–4
10	April 15	Devil Rays	11–1	Carpenter (1–1)	Santana (0–2)		23,765	6–4
11	April 16	Orioles	7–6	Lloyd (2–0)	Bones (0–1)	Person (1)	25,281	7–4
12	April 17	Orioles	7–4	Wells (3–0)	Linton (0–1)	Lloyd (1)	30,739	8–4
13	April 18	Orioles	6–0	Halladay (2–0)	Guzmán (0–2)		27,126	9–4
14	April 20	Angels	5–1	Escobar (2–0)	Finley (1–2)		23,775	10–4
15	April 21	Angels	3–2	Carpenter (2–1)	Olivares (2–1)	Person (2)	23,749	11–4
16	April 22	Angels	8–7	Davey (1–0)	Petkovsek (0–1)	Lloyd (2)	28,212	12–4
17	April 23	@ Yankees	6–4	Hernández (3–1)	Wells (3–1)	Rivera (3)	36,529	12–5
18	April 24	@ Yankees	7–4	Mendoza (2–1)	Plesac (0–1)	Rivera (4)	46,924	12–6
19	April 25	@ Yankees	4–3 (11)	Grimsley (1–0)	Person (0–1)		51,903	12–7
20	April 26	@ Angels	4–3 (11)	Percival (1–1)	Rodríguez (0–1)		17,324	12–8
21	April 27	@ Angels	10–1	Hentgen (1–1)	Olivares (2–2)		17,899	13–8
22	April 28	@ Angels	12–10	Petkovsek (1–1)	Lloyd (2–1)	Percival (3)	18,304	13–9
23	April 29	@ Angels	17–1	Hill (1–1)	Halladay (2–1)		18,346	13–10
24	April 30	@ Mariners	11–9	Halama (1–2)	Person (0–2)	Mesa (6)	29,353	13–11

May: 11–17 (Home: 4–12; Away: 7–5)

#	Date	Opponent	Score	Win	Loss	Save	Attendance	Record
25	May 1	@ Mariners	9–3	Carpenter (3–1)	Moyer (1–4)	Davey (1)	35,628	14–11
26	May 2	@ Mariners	3–2	Cloude (3–1)	Plesac (0–2)		31,355	14–12
27	May 3	@ Mariners	16–10	Wells (4–1)	García (3–1)		22,304	15–12
28	May 4	Athletics	13–4	Oquist (3–2)	Halladay (2–2)	Jones (1)	20,258	15–13
29	May 5	Athletics	8–2	Rogers (1–2)	Escobar (2–1)		20,314	15–14
30	May 6	Athletics	3–2	Heredia (2–2)	Carpenter (3–2)	Taylor (7)	20,310	15–15
31	May 7	Rangers	9–6	Hentgen (2–1)	Clark (2–3)	Koch (1)	22,110	16–15
32	May 8	Rangers	4–3	Morgan (5–2)	Wells (4–2)	Wetteland (10)	24,642	16–16
33	May 9	Rangers	11–6	Patterson (1–0)	Munro (0–1)		20,374	16–17
34	May 11	@ Royals	8–2	Escobar (3–1)	Pittsley (1–2)		12,141	17–17
35	May 12	@ Royals	7–1	Appier (4–2)	Carpenter (3–3)		13,073	17–18
36	May 13	@ Royals	8–2	Hentgen (3–1)	Rosado (2–2)		19,573	18–18
37	May 14	Red Sox	5–0	Peña (2–0)	Wells (4–3)		22,186	18–19
38	May 15	Red Sox	6–5	Wasdin (2–0)	Plesac (0–3)	Gordon (4)	24,579	18–20
39	May 16	Red Sox	9–6	Lloyd (3–1)	Gross (0–2)		21,094	19–20
40	May 17	Red Sox	8–7	Wasdin (3–0)	Lloyd (3–2)		20,395	19–21
41	May 18	Tigers	7–5	Hentgen (4–1)	Thompson (4–5)	Koch (2)	20,310	20–21
42	May 19	Tigers	7–3	Moehler (4–3)	Wells (4–4)		20,384	20–22
43	May 20	Tigers	7–0	Halladay (3–2)	Mlicki (1–4)		21,137	21–22
44	May 21	@ Red Sox	5–2	Rapp (2–2)	Escobar (3–2)		27,284	21–23
45	May 22	@ Red Sox	6–4	Wakefield (2–4)	Carpenter (3–4)	Gordon (6)	32,038	21–24
46	May 23	@ Red Sox	10–8	Martínez (9–1)	Hentgen (4–2)	Gordon (7)	28,559	21–25
47	May 24	@ Tigers	12–6	Wells (5–4)	Moehler (4–4)		13,038	22–25
48	May 25	@ Tigers	5–3	Halladay (4–2)	Mlicki (1–5)	Koch (3)	13,087	23–25
49	May 26	@ Tigers	9–5	Escobar (4–2)	Blair (1–5)	Lloyd (3)	14,177	24–25
50	May 28	Yankees	10–6	Pettitte (3–2)	Carpenter (3–5)		30,355	24–26
51	May 29	Yankees	8–3	Cone (5–2)	Hentgen (4–3)		40,175	24–27
52	May 30	Yankees	8–3	Irabu (2–3)	Wells (5–5)		39,111	24–28

June: 15–13 (Home: 12–5; Away: 3–8)

#	Date	Opponent	Score	Win	Loss	Save	Attendance	Record
53	June 1	White Sox	6–2	Sirotka (3–6)	Escobar (4–3)		20,399	24–29
54	June 2	White Sox	9–7	Carpenter (4–5)	Snyder (6–4)	Koch (4)	22,197	25–29
55	June 3	White Sox	10–3	Navarro (4–4)	Hentgen (4–4)		33,673	25–30
56	June 4	Expos	6–2	Wells (6–5)	Ayala (0–5)		24,147	26–30
57	June 5	Expos	5–0	Batista (5–2)	Hamilton (0–3)		28,112	26–31
58	June 6	Expos	9–2	Escobar (5–3)	Hermanson (3–5)		24,392	27–31
59	June 7	@ Mets	8–2	Hershiser (5–5)	Halladay (4–3)		21,457	27–32
60	June 8	@ Mets	11–3	Isringhausen (1–1)	Hentgen (4–5)		18,984	27–33
61	June 9	@ Mets	4–3 (14)	Mahomes (2–0)	Davey (1–1)		18,254	27–34
62	June 11	@ Phillies	8–4	Wolf (1–0)	Hamilton (0–4)		26,541	27–35
63	June 12	@ Phillies	7–2	Byrd (9–3)	Escobar (5–4)		20,449	27–36
64	June 13	@ Phillies	7–2	Hentgen (5–5)	Schilling (8–4)		28,459	28–36
65	June 15	Angels	13–2	Wells (7–5)	Belcher (4–6)		21,165	29–36
66	June 16	Angels	3–2	Lloyd (4–2)	Schoeneweis (0–1)	Koch (5)	22,184	30–36
67	June 17	Angels	3–0	Escobar (6–4)	Hill (3–6)	Koch (6)	20,465	31–36
68	June 18	Royals	6–5	Witasick (2–5)	Hentgen (5–6)	Whisenant (1)	24,245	31–37
69	June 19	Royals	7–0	Halladay (5–3)	Appier (6–6)		23,369	32–37
70	June 20	Royals	2–1	Wells (8–5)	Service (3–2)		24,211	33–37
71	June 21	Royals	11–4	Hamilton (1–4)	Fussell (0–4)		20,394	34–37
72	June 22	Indians	4–3	Escobar (7–4)	Gooden (2–3)	Koch (7)	22,197	35–37
73	June 23	Indians	9–6	Nagy (9–4)	Quantrill (0–1)		23,271	35–38
74	June 24	Indians	3–0	Halladay (6–3)	Burba (7–3)	Koch (8)	26,117	36–38
75	June 25	@ Devil Rays	11–4	Álvarez (3–5)	Wells (8–6)		18,633	36–39
76	June 26	@ Devil Rays	5–2	Rupe (4–3)	Hamilton (1–5)	Hernández (21)	22,062	36–40
77	June 27	@ Devil Rays	8–0	Witt (4–4)	Escobar (7–5)		20,556	36–41
78	June 28	@ Devil Rays	3–2	Carpenter (5–5)	Eiland (0–4)	Koch (9)	17,727	37–41
79	June 29	Orioles	6–5 (10)	Frascatore (1–0)	Rhodes (3–3)		21,421	38–41
80	June 30	Orioles	10–9 (10)	Frascatore (2–0)	Orosco (0–2)		21,137	39–41

July: 19–7 (Home: 9–5; Away: 10–2)

#	Date	Opponent	Score	Win	Loss	Save	Attendance	Record
81	July 1	Orioles	8–6	Frascatore (3–0)	Timlin (3–7)	Koch (10)	30,263	40–41
82	July 2	Devil Rays	8–7	Aldred (3–2)	Escobar (7–6)	Hernández (22)	23,109	40–42
83	July 3	Devil Rays	5–0	Carpenter (6–5)	Witt (4–5)		25,344	41–42
84	July 4	Devil Rays	6–3	Hentgen (6–6)	White (4–2)	Koch (11)	24,639	42–42
85	July 6	@ Orioles	4–3 (10)	Lloyd (5–2)	Timlin (3–8)	Koch (12)	37,939	43–42
86	July 7	@ Orioles	7–6	Spoljaric (1–0)	Molina (0–1)	Koch (13)	42,275	44–42
87	July 8	@ Orioles	11–6	Escobar (8–6)	Ponson (7–6)		41,738	45–42
88	July 9	@ Expos	4–3	Urbina (5–4)	Lloyd (5–3)		10,091	45–43
89	July 10	@ Expos	7–6	Quantrill (1–1)	Telford (2–2)	Koch (14)	15,005	46–43
90	July 11	@ Expos	1–0	Wells (9–6)	Pavano (6–8)		15,201	47–43
91	July 15	Marlins	8–6	Looper (2–1)	Koch (0–1)	Alfonseca (2)	25,072	47–44
92	July 16	Marlins	4–2	Springer (4–10)	Hentgen (6–7)	Alfonseca (3)	22,449	47–45
93	July 17	Marlins	6–1	Wells (10–6)	Edmondson (3–4)		27,159	48–45
94	July 18	Braves	3–2	Hamilton (2–5)	Millwood (11–5)	Koch (15)	31,137	49–45
95	July 19	Braves	8–7 (10)	Frascatore (4–0)	Hudek (0–2)		31,064	50–45
96	July 20	Braves	11–6	Halladay (7–3)	Glavine (8–9)		28,366	51–45
97	July 21	@ Indians	4–3	Frascatore (5–0)	Jackson (3–3)	Koch (16)	43,218	52–45
98	July 22	@ Indians	4–3	Wells (11–6)	Nagy (11–6)	Koch (17)	43,138	53–45
99	July 23	@ White Sox	2–1	Hamilton (3–5)	Parque (9–7)	Koch (18)	14,166	54–45
100	July 24	@ White Sox	6–5	Eyre (1–0)	Escobar (8–7)	Howry (16)	25,674	54–46
101	July 25	@ White Sox	11–3	Carpenter (7–5)	Sirotka (7–9)		18,299	55–46
102	July 26	@ White Sox	4–3 (11)	Frascatore (6–0)	Howry (2–2)	Koch (19)	17,631	56–46
103	July 27	Red Sox	11–9	Guthrie (1–1)	Halladay (7–4)	Wakefield (13)	38,631	56–47
104	July 28	Red Sox	8–0	Rapp (3–5)	Hamilton (3–6)		36,190	56–48
105	July 30	Tigers	8–2	Escobar (9–7)	Weaver (6–7)		28,412	57–48
106	July 31	Tigers	7–6	Halladay (8–4)	Mlicki (5–10)	Koch (20)	29,527	58–48

August: 12–16 (Home: 2–10; Away: 10–6)

#	Date	Opponent	Score	Win	Loss	Save	Attendance	Record
107	August 1	Tigers	8–5	Hentgen (7–7)	Borkowski (0–2)	Koch (21)	30,105	59–48
108	August 2	@ Yankees	3–1	Pettitte (8–8)	Wells (11–7)	Rivera (28)	40,825	59–49
109	August 3	@ Yankees	3–1	Hamilton (4–6)	Cone (10–6)	Koch (22)	43,110	60–49
110	August 4	@ Yankees	8–3	Irabu (9–3)	Escobar (9–8)		52,833	60–50
111	August 6	@ Rangers	5–4	Carpenter (8–5)	Zimmerman (9–1)	Koch (23)	31,664	61–50
112	August 7	@ Rangers	6–0	Sele (12–6)	Hentgen (7–8)		40,329	61–51
113	August 8	@ Rangers	8–7	Frascatore (7–0)	Venafro (3–2)	Koch (24)	32,374	62–51
114	August 9	@ Rangers	19–4	Hamilton (5–6)	Morgan (12–7)		23,235	63–51
115	August 10	@ Twins	10–6	Escobar (10–8)	Radke (8–11)		15,842	64–51
116	August 11	@ Twins	6–3	Carpenter (9–5)	Milton (4–9)		15,777	65–51
117	August 12	@ Twins	3–0	Mays (5–4)	Hentgen (7–9)	Trombley (19)	21,206	65–52
118	August 13	Athletics	9–8	Appier (12–9)	Halladay (8–5)	Jones (7)	34,150	65–53
119	August 14	Athletics	13–5	Hudson (7–1)	Hamilton (5–7)		37,113	65–54
120	August 15	Athletics	9–5	Oquist (9–7)	Escobar (10–9)		34,677	65–55
121	August 16	Mariners	7–5	Moyer (12–6)	Carpenter (9–6)	Mesa (26)	29,308	65–56
122	August 17	Mariners	8–5	Abbott (4–0)	Hentgen (7–10)	Mesa (27)	30,137	65–57
123	August 18	Mariners	5–1	García (12–7)	Wells (11–8)	Paniagua (3)	38,224	65–58
124	August 20	@ Athletics	11–0	Hamilton (6–7)	Oquist (9–8)		13,335	66–58
125	August 21	@ Athletics	8–4	Olivares (11–9)	Carpenter (9–7)		26,282	66–59
126	August 22	@ Athletics	4–3	Jones (4–5)	Koch (0–2)		23,907	66–60
127	August 23	@ Athletics	9–4	Wells (12–8)	Appier (12–11)		10,047	67–60
128	August 24	@ Angels	5–1	Hentgen (8–10)	Ortiz (1–1)	Koch (25)	21,492	68–60
129	August 25	@ Angels	7–2	Hamilton (7–7)	Finley (8–11)		21,592	69–60
130	August 27	Rangers	8–2	Helling (11–7)	Carpenter (9–8)		30,181	69–61
131	August 28	Rangers	9–7	Sele (15–7)	Wells (12–9)	Wetteland (35)	31,117	69–62
132	August 29	Rangers	4–2	Burkett (5–7)	Halladay (8–6)	Wetteland (36)	30,502	69–63
133	August 30	Twins	2–1	Hentgen (9–10)	Ryan (0–2)	Koch (26)	22,137	70–63
134	August 31	Twins	14–3	Radke (11–12)	Hamilton (7–8)		23,136	70–64

September: 11–14 (Home: 3–8; Away: 8–6)

#	Date	Opponent	Score	Win	Loss	Save	Attendance	Record
135	September 1	Twins	4–0	Escobar (11–9)	Milton (6–11)		23,145	71–64
136	September 2	Twins	6–1	Wells (13–9)	Mays (5–7)		22,255	72–64
137	September 3	@ Royals	5–4	Quantrill (2–1)	Morman (2–3)	Koch (27)	13,857	73–64
138	September 4	@ Royals	6–3 (9)	Hentgen (10–10)	Suppan (8–9)	Frascatore (1)	15,243	74–64
139	September 5	@ Royals	6–3	Witasick (6–11)	Escobar (11–10)	Fussell (2)	15,315	74–65
140	September 7	@ Mariners	7–4	Meche (6–4)	Wells (13–10)	Mesa (32)	39,709	74–66
141	September 8	@ Mariners	4–3	Mesa (2–5)	Koch (0–3)		36,971	74–67
142	September 10	@ Tigers	7–6	Jones (3–4)	Frascatore (7–1)		33,736	74–68
143	September 11	@ Tigers	9–5	Spoljaric (2–0)	Cordero (1–2)		40,269	75–68
144	September 12	@ Tigers	5–3	Escobar (12–10)	Weaver (8–11)	Koch (28)	39,349	76–68
145	September 13	Yankees	2–1	Wells (14–10)	Hernández (16–8)		30,118	77–68
146	September 14	Yankees	10–6	Mendoza (7–8)	Koch (0–4)		29,140	77–69
147	September 15	Yankees	6–4	Pettitte (13–11)	Hentgen (10–11)	Rivera (41)	29,460	77–70
148	September 17	White Sox	7–3	Wells (3–1)	Escobar (12–11)		30,743	77–71
149	September 18	White Sox	7–4	Navarro (8–12)	Quantrill (2–2)	Howry (23)	28,260	77–72
150	September 19	White Sox	3–2	Sirotka (10–13)	Halladay (8–7)	Howry (24)	27,120	77–73
151	September 21	@ Red Sox	3–0	Martínez (22–4)	Hentgen (10–12)		27,799	77–74
152	September 22	@ Red Sox	14–9	Escobar (13–11)	Rapp (6–7)		25,345	78–74
153	September 23	@ Red Sox	7–5	Wells (15–10)	Beck (0–1)	Koch (29)	30,780	79–74
154	September 24	Indians	18–4	Brower (2–1)	Munro (0–2)		26,620	79–75
155	September 25	Indians	9–6	Colón (17–5)	Spoljaric (2–1)	Jackson (38)	32,029	79–76
156	September 26	Indians	11–7	Shuey (8–5)	Koch (0–5)		34,253	79–77
157	September 28	@ Devil Rays	8–2	Wells (16–10)	Wheeler (0–4)		19,781	80–77
158	September 29	@ Devil Rays	6–2	Escobar (14–11)	Witt (7–15)		22,180	81–77
159	September 30	@ Indians	9–2	Colón (18–5)	Spoljaric (2–2)		43,201	81–78

October: 3–0 (Home: 0–0; Away: 3–0)

#	Date	Opponent	Score	Win	Loss	Save	Attendance	Record
160	October 1	@ Indians	8–6	Quantrill (3–2)	Karsay (10–2)	Koch (30)	43,040	82–78
161	October 2	@ Indians	7–3	Hentgen (11–12)	Wright (8–10)	Koch (31)	43,049	83–78
162	October 3	@ Indians	9–2	Wells (17–10)	Burba (15–9)		43,012	84–78

== Player stats ==
= Indicates team leader

=== Batting ===
==== Starters by position ====
Note: Pos = Position; G = Games played; AB = At bats; H = Hits; Avg. = Batting average; HR = Home runs; RBI = Runs batted in

Pos	Player	G	AB	H	Avg.	HR	RBI
C	Darrin Fletcher	115	412	120	.291	18	80
1B	Carlos Delgado	152	573	156	.272	44	134
2B	Homer Bush	128	485	155	.320	5	55
SS	Tony Batista	98	375	107	.285	26	79
3B	Tony Fernández	142	485	159	.328	6	75
LF	Shannon Stewart	145	608	185	.304	11	67
CF	José Cruz Jr.	106	349	84	.241	14	45
RF	Shawn Green	158	614	190	.309	42	123
DH	Willie Greene	81	226	46	.204	12	41

==== Other batters ====
Note: G = Games played; AB = At bats; H = Hits; Avg. = Batting average; HR = Home runs; RBI = Runs batted in

Player	G	AB	H	Avg.	HR	RBI
Jacob Brumfield	62	170	40	.235	2	19
Mike Matheny	57	163	35	.215	3	17
Alex Gonzalez	38	154	45	.292	2	12
Willis Otáñez	42	127	32	.252	5	13
Pat Kelly	37	116	31	.267	6	20
Craig Grebeck	34	113	41	.363	0	10
Dave Hollins	27	99	22	.222	2	6
David Segui	31	95	30	.316	5	13
Vernon Wells	24	88	23	.261	1	8
Brian McRae	31	82	16	.195	3	11
Gerónimo Berroa	22	62	12	.194	1	6
Casey Blake	14	39	10	.256	1	1
Kevin Witt	15	34	7	.206	1	5
Patrick Lennon	9	29	6	.207	1	6
Norberto Martin	9	27	6	.222	0	0
Mark Dalesandro	16	27	5	.185	0	1
Chris Woodward	14	26	6	.231	0	2
Pat Borders	6	14	3	.214	1	3
Kevin Brown	2	9	4	.444	0	1
Curtis Goodwin	2	8	0	.000	0	0
Rob Butler	8	7	1	.143	0	1
Anthony Sanders	3	7	2	.286	0	2

=== Pitching ===
==== Starting pitchers ====
Note: G = Games pitched; IP = Innings pitched; W = Wins; L = Losses; ERA = Earned run average; SO = Strikeouts

Player	G	IP	W	L	ERA	SO
David Wells	34	231.2	17	10	4.82	169
Pat Hentgen	34	199.0	11	12	4.79	118
Kelvim Escobar	33	174.0	14	11	5.69	129
Chris Carpenter	24	150.0	9	8	4.38	106
Joey Hamilton	22	98.0	7	8	6.52	56

==== Other pitchers ====
Note: G = Games pitched; IP = Innings pitched; W = Wins; L = Losses; ERA = Earned run average; SO = Strikeouts

Player	G	IP	W	L	ERA	SO
Roy Halladay	36	149.1	8	7	3.92	82

==== Relief pitchers ====
Note: G = Games pitched; W = Wins; L = Losses; SV = Saves; ERA = Earned run average; SO = Strikeouts

Player	G	W	L	SV	ERA	SO
Billy Koch	56	0	5	31	3.39	57
Graeme Lloyd	74	5	3	3	3.63	47
Paul Quantrill	41	3	2	0	3.33	28
Paul Spoljaric	37	2	2	0	4.65	63
John Frascatore	33	7	1	1	3.41	22
Pete Munro	31	0	2	0	6.02	38
Dan Plesac	30	0	3	0	3.34	26
Tom Davey	29	1	1	1	4.70	42
Robert Person	11	0	2	2	9.82	12
Steve Sinclair	3	0	0	0	12.71	3
Mike Romano	3	0	0	0	11.81	3
John Hudek	3	0	0	0	12.27	2
Nerio Rodriguez	2	0	1	0	13.50	2
John Bale	1	0	0	0	13.50	4
Eric Ludwick	1	0	0	0	27.00	0
Gary Glover	1	0	0	0	0.00	0

== Award winners ==
- Carlos Delgado, Silver Slugger Award
- Shawn Green, Gold Glove Award
- Shawn Green, Silver Slugger Award

All-Star Game

- Tony Fernández, 3B
- Shawn Green, OF

== Farm system ==
Level	Team	League	Manager
AAA	Syracuse SkyChiefs	International League	Pat Kelly
AA	Knoxville Smokies	Southern League	Omar Malavé
A	Dunedin Blue Jays	Florida State League	Rocket Wheeler
A	Hagerstown Suns	South Atlantic League	Rolando Pino
A-Short Season	St. Catharines Stompers	New York–Penn League	Eddie Rodríguez
Rookie	Medicine Hat Blue Jays	Pioneer League	Paul Elliott
