= Clayton Andrews =

Clayton Andrews may refer to:

- Clayton Andrews (baseball, born 1997), American baseball player
- Clayton Andrews (baseball, born 1978), American baseball player
