= Esteban Loaiza =

Mexican baseball player (born 1971)

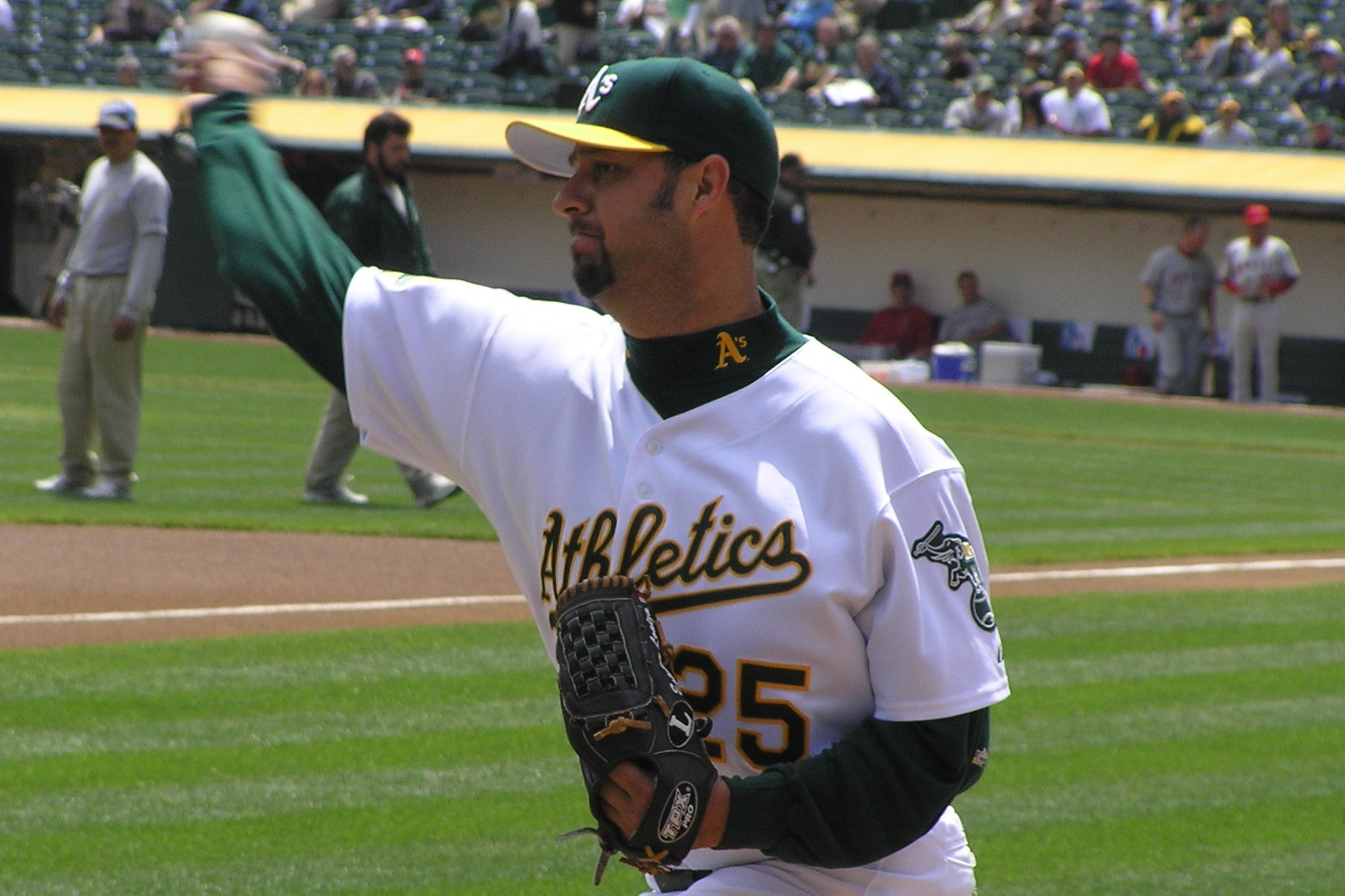
- Loaiza with the Oakland Athletics
- Pitcher
- Born: December 31, 1971 (age 54); Tijuana, Mexico
- Batted: Right Threw: Right

MLB debut
- April 29, 1995, for the Pittsburgh Pirates

Last MLB appearance
- June 11, 2008, for the Chicago White Sox

MLB statistics
- Win–loss record: 126–114
- Earned run average: 4.65
- Strikeouts: 1,382
- Stats at Baseball Reference

Teams
- Pittsburgh Pirates (1995–1998); Texas Rangers (1998–2000); Toronto Blue Jays (2000–2002); Chicago White Sox (2003–2004); New York Yankees (2004); Washington Nationals (2005); Oakland Athletics (2006–2007); Los Angeles Dodgers (2007–2008); Chicago White Sox (2008)

Career highlights and awards
- 2× All-Star (2003, 2004); AL strikeout leader (2003)

Esteban Antonio Loaiza Veyna [lo-EYE-sa] (born December 31, 1971) is a Mexican former professional baseball pitcher and coach. He played in Major League Baseball for the Pittsburgh Pirates, Texas Rangers, Toronto Blue Jays, Chicago White Sox, New York Yankees, Washington Nationals, Oakland Athletics, and Los Angeles Dodgers. Loaiza was the American League's (AL) starting pitcher in the 2003 All-Star Game. That year, he led the AL in strikeouts.

== Playing career ==
=== Pittsburgh Pirates ===
==== Minor leagues ====
A graduate of Mar Vista High School in Imperial Beach, California, Loaiza was signed by the Pittsburgh Pirates as an undrafted free agent on March 21, 1991. He made his professional debut that year with the Rookie-level Gulf Coast League Pirates 1991, finishing with a 5–1 record and a 2.26 earned run average (ERA) in 11 starts. He moved through the Pirates farm system with stops with the Augusta GreenJackets (Single-A – 1992), Salem Buccaneers (Single-A – 1993) and Carolina Mudcats (Double-A – 1993–1994). He also played for the Diablos Rojos del México of the Mexican League during the 1993 season.

==== Major leagues ====
Loaiza moved to the big league club in 1995, making his major league debut on April 29, 1995 for the Pirates against the Philadelphia Phillies. He worked five innings in the game, giving up five hits and one unearned run to achieve the first major league win of his career. He finished his rookie season with an 8–9 record and a 5.16 ERA in 31 starts.

He began the 1996 season back in the minors with the Triple-A Calgary Cannons, but was recalled to the majors on June 7.

=== Texas Rangers ===
The Pirates traded Loaiza to the Texas Rangers on July 17, 1998, in exchange for Todd Van Poppel and Warren Morris. He spent the next two seasons with Texas, pitching both as a starter and a reliever for the Rangers.

=== Toronto Blue Jays ===
The Rangers traded Loaiza to the Toronto Blue Jays for Michael Young and Darwin Cubillán on July 19, 2000. He pitched with the Blue Jays through 2002.

=== Chicago White Sox (2003–2004) ===
On January 24, 2003, Loaiza signed a minor league contract with the Chicago White Sox. He enjoyed a career season in 2003, receiving his first career All-Star selection. He led American League pitchers in strikeouts (207) and finished second in wins (21) and strikeouts per nine innings (8.23); third in ERA (2.90), and sixth in innings pitched (226 1/3). Considered for the Cy Young Award, Loaiza finished second behind Roy Halladay, ahead of Pedro Martínez and Tim Hudson. Loaiza's 21 wins in 2003 are tied for the most ever in a season for a Mexican pitcher; Fernando Valenzuela won 21 games in 1986. In 2004, Loaiza was selected to his second All-Star Game as a member of the White Sox.

=== New York Yankees ===
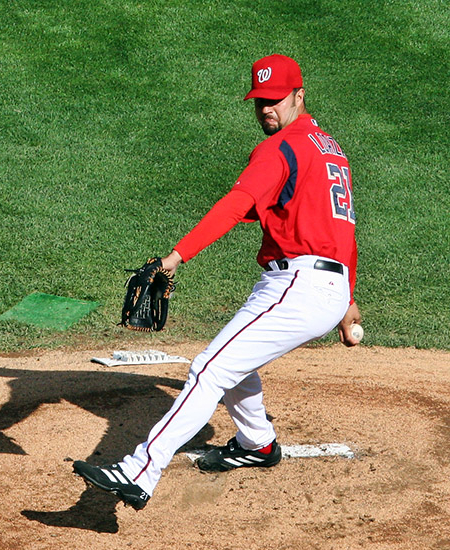
Loaiza pitching for the Washington Nationals on April 27, 2005.

Soon after his appearance in the All-Star Game, Loaiza was traded to the New York Yankees on July 31 for José Contreras. He did not perform well in New York, recording a 8.46 ERA in six August starts, and was moved to the bullpen during the final month of the regular season. During the ALCS against the Boston Red Sox, he pitched well in two relief outings despite recording the loss in Game 5.

=== Washington Nationals ===
On January 18, 2005, Loaiza signed a one-year, $2.9 million deal with the Washington Nationals as a free agent. He went 12–10 with a 3.77 ERA in 34 starts for the Nationals.

=== Oakland Athletics ===
On November 28, 2005, Loaiza signed a three-year, $21.4 million contract with the Oakland Athletics. He had a disastrous start to his Oakland career, which led many fans to question his acquisition. Loaiza went 0–3 in April with an 8.35 ERA and opponents batted .385 against him. His early season troubles reached a nadir on April 29 when he gave up six runs in one plus innings to the Kansas City Royals, who had the worst record in baseball at the time; the game was not official since it was later rained out. Loaiza's poor performance was at least partly due to injury, as he seemed to have very little velocity on his fastball early in the season (throwing it at as little as 82–83 mph) and was placed on the disabled list with back and shoulder problems on May 2. When he returned on June 8, he was inconsistent, but appeared to be much healthier, due to his ability to demonstrate a much harder 95 mph fastball. On June 25, 2006, Loaiza pitched his first complete game in over two years in a 10–4 victory over the San Francisco Giants. Loaiza finished the 2006 regular season with a 4.89 ERA and a record of 11–9 in 26 starts.

Loaiza began the 2007 season on the disabled list due to a strained right trapezius. The A's activated him and moved him back to the 25-man roster on August 22, 2007.

=== Los Angeles Dodgers ===
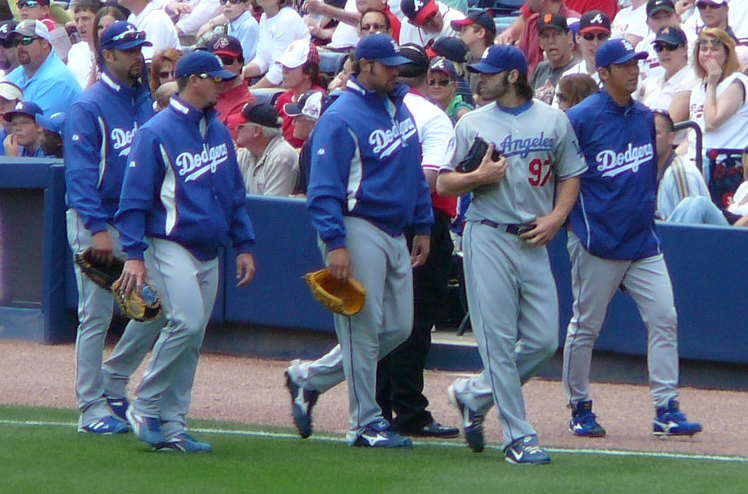
Loaiza (far left) with fellow Dodgers pitchers Scott Proctor, Jonathan Broxton, Joe Beimel and Takashi Saito in 2008

On August 29, 2007, the Los Angeles Dodgers claimed Loaiza off waivers from the Athletics. Instead of trading for Loaiza, the Dodgers purchased the remainder of his contract.

He made an impressive debut for the Dodgers on September 3, working seven innings and getting the win in an 11–3 victory over the Chicago Cubs, but struggled during the rest of the season, losing his last four decisions.

Going into the 2008 season, he had fully recovered from his injuries and regained his spot as the fifth starter in the Dodgers rotation. Loaiza struggled at the beginning of the season, and as a result lost his starting position to lefty Hong-Chih Kuo. After a stint on the DL, Loaiza was designated for assignment on May 24 and subsequently released.

=== Chicago White Sox (2008) ===
On June 4, 2008, Loaiza signed a one-year contract with the Chicago White Sox. After three relief appearances and six weeks on the disabled list, he was released on July 25.

== Coaching career ==
On April 20, 2023, Loaiza joined El Águila de Veracruz of the Mexican League as the team's pitching coach. He was fired by the team on November 19, 2025.

== Personal life ==
=== Family ===
In 2010, Loaiza married Mexican-American singer Jenni Rivera. He made several appearances on her family's reality television show, I Love Jenni. Divorce papers were filed on October 1, 2012. A statement, released by Rivera's representatives, stated that the divorce was due to "irreconcilable differences on behalf of both parties derived from private circumstances that occurred during the lapse of their two-year marriage." Rivera died on December 9, 2012, when her private plane crashed, before the divorce was finalized.

=== Legal issues ===
On June 14, 2006, Loaiza was arrested after being pulled over by police who clocked his Ferrari at 120 mph (190 km/h) on a California freeway near San Lorenzo. He subsequently failed a sobriety test. He appeared in court on July 14, 2006. After the incident, Athletics general manager Billy Beane banned alcohol in both the home and visitor clubhouse, citing liability issues.

Loaiza was arrested on February 9, 2018, in San Diego, California, with over 20 kilograms (44 lb) of cocaine, according to the San Diego County Sheriff's Department. He was charged with felony counts of possession or purchase of narcotics and transportation or sale of narcotics. Loaiza pleaded guilty to the charges in August, and was sentenced on March 8, 2019, to serve a three-year prison sentence. He was released from prison on August 6, 2021 and deported to Mexico.

Awards and achievements
Preceded by Andy Pettitte	American League; Pitcher of the Month; April 2003	Succeeded by Roy Halladay
Preceded by Derek Lowe	American League All-Star Game; Starting Pitcher; 2003	Succeeded by Mark Mulder
