= Michael Young (baseball) =

American baseball player (born 1976)

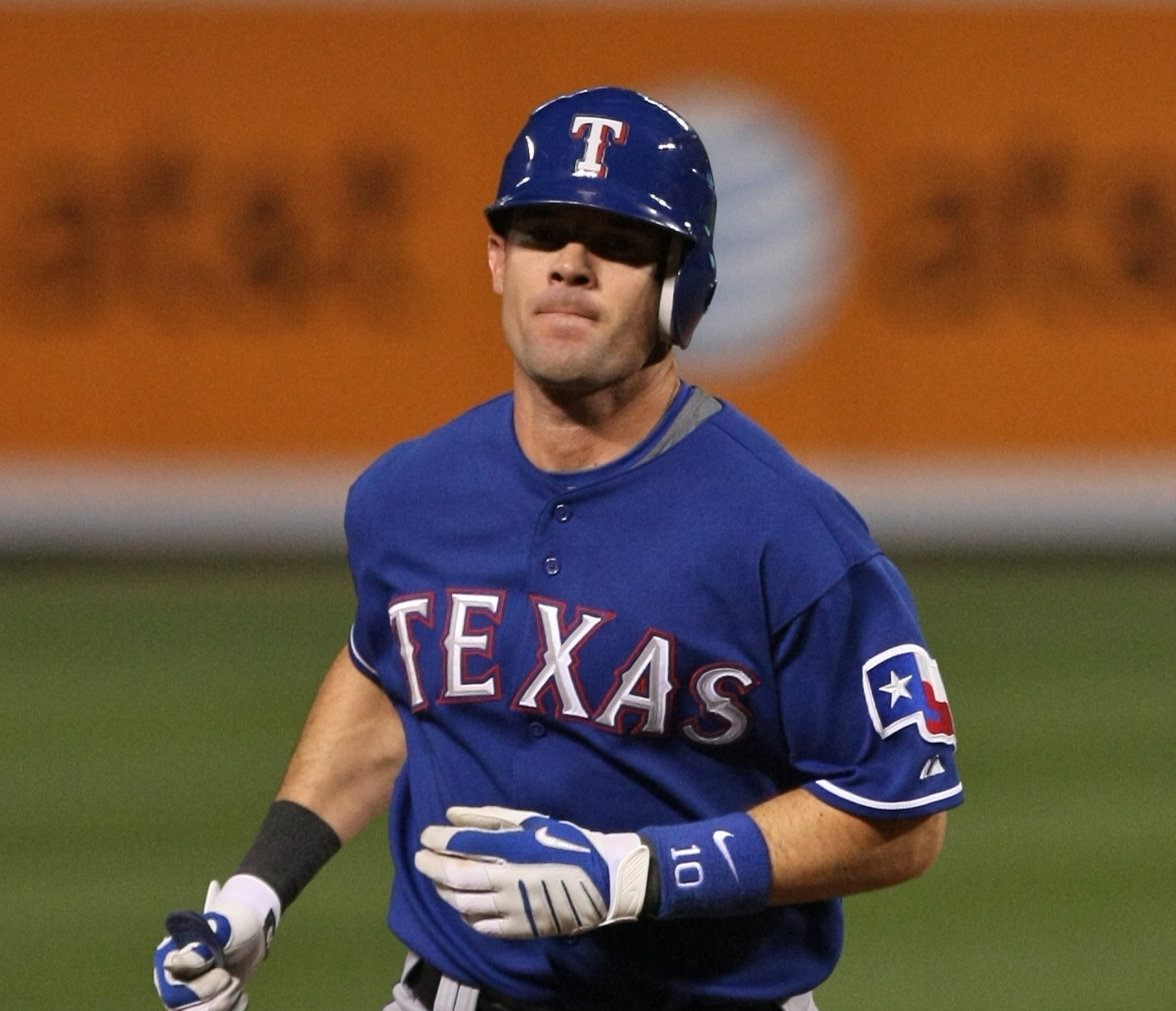
- Young with the Texas Rangers in 2009
- Infielder
- Born: October 19, 1976 (age 50); Covina, California, U.S.
- Batted: Right Threw: Right

MLB debut
- September 29, 2000, for the Texas Rangers

Last MLB appearance
- September 29, 2013, for the Los Angeles Dodgers

MLB statistics
- Batting average: .300
- Hits: 2,375
- Home runs: 185
- Runs batted in: 1,030
- Stats at Baseball Reference

Teams
- Texas Rangers (2000–2012); Philadelphia Phillies (2013); Los Angeles Dodgers (2013)

Career highlights and awards
- 7× All-Star (2004–2009, 2011); Gold Glove Award (2008); AL batting champion (2005); Texas Rangers No. 10 retired; Texas Rangers Hall of Fame

Michael Brian Young (born October 19, 1976) is an American former professional baseball infielder who played 14 seasons in Major League Baseball (MLB) for the Texas Rangers, Philadelphia Phillies, and Los Angeles Dodgers. Since 2014, Young has worked in the Rangers’ front office as a Special Assistant to the General Manager. Originally a second baseman, the versatile Young was a five-time All-Star at shortstop, once at third base, and once as a combination designated hitter / utility infielder. He was the 2005 American League (AL) batting champion.

Young played baseball in high school at Bishop Amat Memorial High School and in college at University of California, Santa Barbara (UC Santa Barbara). He was originally drafted by the Baltimore Orioles in 1994, but elected to return to college and was eventually drafted in 1997 by the Toronto Blue Jays. After spending several seasons in the minor leagues with the Blue Jays, Young was traded to the Rangers, where he spent over a decade. While with the Rangers, Young set several club records in offensive statistical categories, including runs scored and total bases. In 2016, Young was inducted into the Texas Rangers Hall of Fame. In 2019, Young's No. 10 was retired by the Rangers.

== Early life and education ==
Young attended Bishop Amat Memorial High School in La Puente, California, followed by the University of California, Santa Barbara, to which he later donated money to refurbish the school's baseball field.

Young was drafted by the Baltimore Orioles in the 25th round of the 1994 Major League Baseball draft but did not sign. Three years later the Toronto Blue Jays selected him in the fifth round of the 1997 Major League Baseball draft. Young signed with the Blue Jays, who traded him in 2000 with pitcher Darwin Cubillán to the Rangers for Esteban Loaiza while Young was still in their minor league system.

== Playing career ==
=== Minor leagues (1997–2000) ===
Young made his professional debut in 1997 with the St. Catharines Blue Jays in the New York–Penn League (NY-Penn) (short-season A). Among his achievements in the NY-Penn League were a 16-game hitting streak, tying for fifth with 48 RBIs, and tying for third in the league with 136 total bases. In 1998, he spent the season with the Hagerstown Suns of the South Atlantic League. Playing second base, he led all players at his position in fielding percentage. 1999 would be an all-star season for Young. Playing for the Dunedin Blue Jays of the Florida State League, he earned spots on both the midseason and postseason all-star teams by leading the league in doubles and finishing fourth in batting average and hits, .313 and 155 respectively. After the regular season, he played for the Rancho Cucamonga Surfers in the California Fall League. He split 2000 between Double-A and Triple-A and, on July 19, was traded to the Rangers with Darwin Cubillán for Esteban Loaiza. The Rangers purchased his contract on September 27. He played the final five games of the season in the majors making his debut as a pinch runner. Though he began 2001 in Triple-A, he was recalled to the majors on May 25 and did not return to the minors during the season.

=== Texas Rangers (2000–2012) ===
Young reached the Majors briefly in 2000, playing 2nd and getting two at-bats. He hit .249 in 106 games as a second baseman in 2001. In 2002, Young placed second in fielding among second basemen with a .988 fielding percentage. In 2003, Young was 3rd in the league in hits with 204 and led all second baseman with a batting average of .306. Young had a fielding percentage of .987.

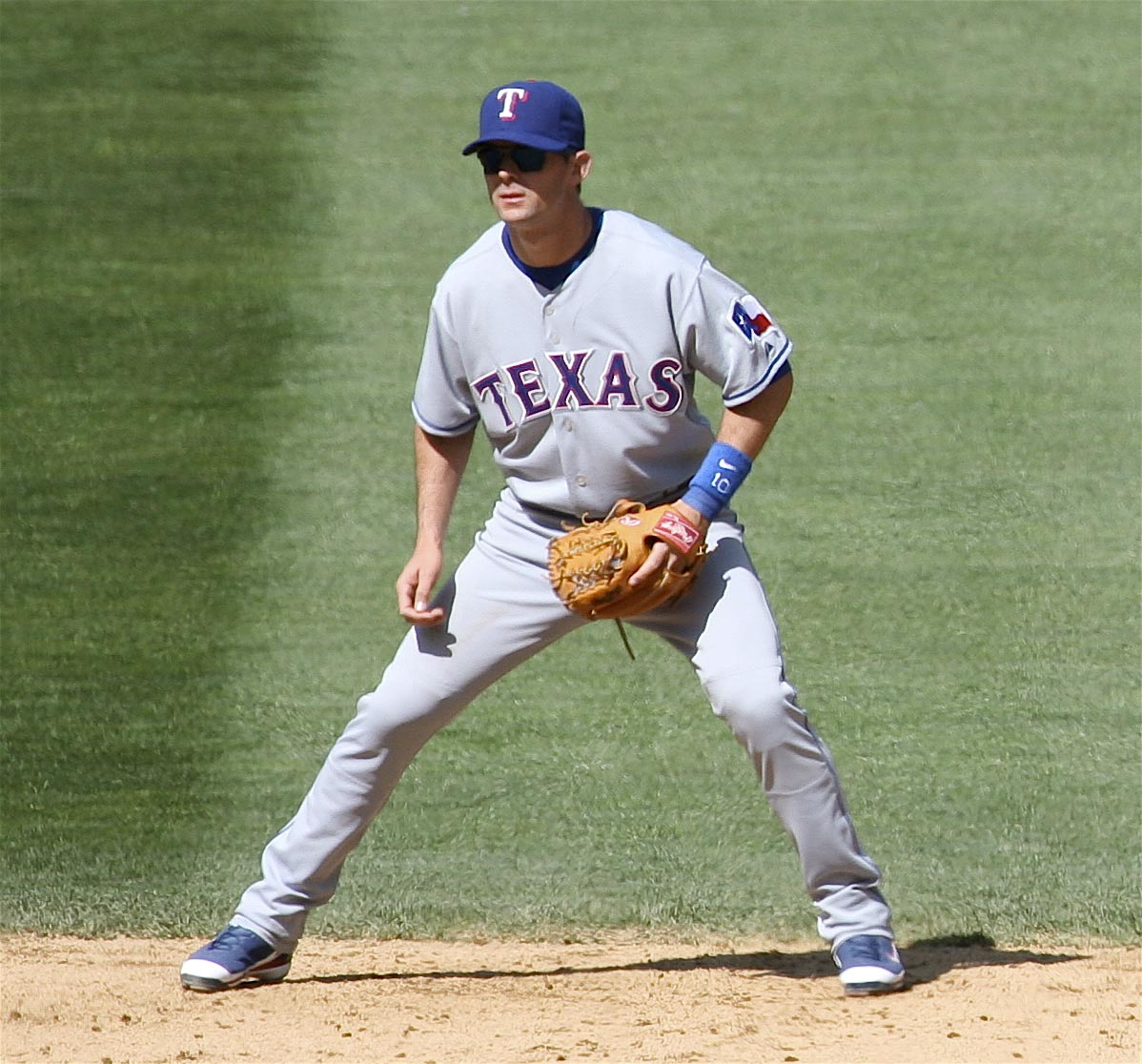
Michael Young on April 25, 2009

After signing a new contract, Young moved to shortstop, filling the hole left by the departure of regular Ranger's shortstop Alex Rodriguez in 2004, to make room for newly acquired second baseman Alfonso Soriano. He was second in the American League in hits with 216 and at bats with 690, fourth in runs with 114, and ninth in batting with an average of .313. He spent 89 games hitting in the leadoff spot, the last time in his career that he hit leadoff before 2013.

Young won the AL batting title in 2005 with an average of .331 and was first in MLB in hits with 221. He was second in AL in at-bats with 668, and his 114 runs were fifth-best. Young also established a career-high in home runs with 24. Young's 91 RBIs placed him second among all shortstops in the AL.

On February 14, 2006, Young and Rangers teammate Mark Teixeira were selected to the United States roster for the 2006 World Baseball Classic.

After the 2006 MLB All-Star Game held at PNC Park in Pittsburgh, Young was awarded the Major League Baseball All-Star Game MVP Award after hitting a game-winning two-run triple in the ninth inning. Young led the American League in fielding percentage at shortstop with .981. Young also played all 162 games of the 2006 season, had 217 hits and topped 100 RBI for the first time in his career.

In March 2007, Young agreed to an $80 million contract extension that would have kept him with the Rangers until 2013.

Young finished the 2007 season with a batting average of .315, which led the Rangers and was 11th-highest in the AL. Young also led the Rangers with 94 RBIs and was second among all shortstops in the AL. Young was second on the team and tied a career-high in stolen bases with 13. Young's 201 hits were 4th in the AL, and marked the 5th consecutive 200-hit season, joining Ichiro Suzuki and Wade Boggs as the only players to do so since 1940 and just the second middle infielder, along with Charlie Gehringer, to have accomplished that feat.

Young played in the longest All-Star game in history. He drove in the game-winning RBI with a walk-off sacrifice fly in the 2008 MLB All-Star Game after four hours and 40 minutes of playing time. Also, in 2008 Young won the Gold Glove at shortstop for the American League.

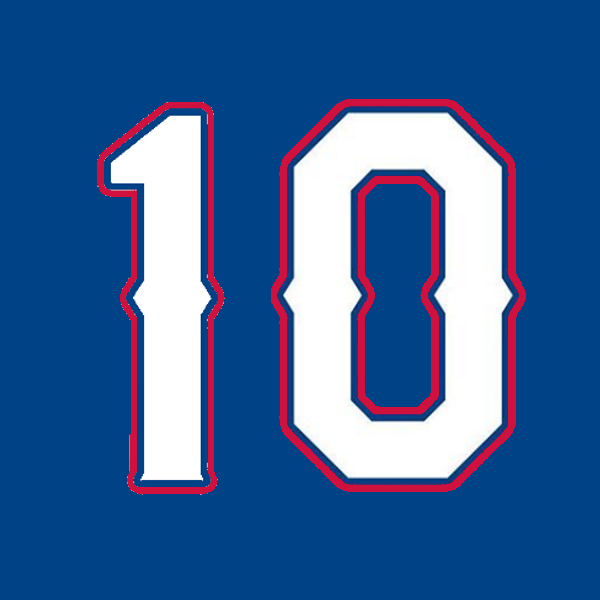
Michael Young's number 10 was retired by the Texas Rangers in 2019.

In 2009, Young moved to third base to make room for shortstop prospect Elvis Andrus. The Rangers did not consult Young on this, and he requested a trade. He subsequently rescinded the request. On April 19, 2009, Young hit his first career walk-off home run, off Royals pitcher Kyle Farnsworth. Young was voted on the AL 2009 All Star team by the players.

On June 16, 2010, Young hit a ground ball up the middle to collect his 1,748th career hit and passed Iván Rodríguez to become the Rangers' career leader in hits. On defense, in 2010 he tied for the AL lead in errors by a third baseman, with 19, and had the lowest fielding percentage among them, at .950.

During the 2010–11 offseason, Young said that the Rangers had "misled and manipulated" him and requested a trade. The Rangers, having acquired free agent third baseman Adrián Beltré, planned to have Young be the team's primary designated hitter as well as a utility infielder, and see time at first base for the first time in his career. He was a 2011 American League All Star.

On August 7, 2011, Young hit an infield single against Josh Tomlin of the Cleveland Indians for his 2,000th career hit.

In 2011, Young batted .338 (3rd in the American League) with 11 home runs, primarily splitting his time between DH (69 games), third base (40 games), and first base (36 games). He tied with Adrián González for the AL lead in hits (213), and was 5th in RBIs (106) and sacrifice flies (9), 8th in on-base percentage (.380), and 10th in doubles (41).

After Young struggled in the 2012 season, the Rangers asked if he desired a trade as they planned to cut his playing time for the 2013 season. Young did not request one, though the Rangers began to pursue a trade, and eventually traded him to the Philadelphia Phillies.

Since being traded in 2012, the Rangers had not issued Young's uniform number 10 to any player or coach. On June 18, 2019, the Rangers announced they would retire Young's number 10 jersey in August.

==== Rangers career rankings ====
At the time of his departure from the team, Young led the Rangers in several stat categories including games played (1774), hits (2178), doubles (406), triples (55), runs scored (1057), at bats (7221), strikeouts (1132), extra-base hits (632), and total bases (3210). He was third all-time in runs batted in (RBIs) with 962 and sixth all-time in home runs with 172. He also held several single-season records including most multi-hit games (70 in 2004), most hits (221 in 2005), doubles (52 in 2006), and at bats and plate appearances in 2006 (691 and 748 respectively).

=== Philadelphia Phillies (2013) ===
Young agreed to waive his no-trade clause and on December 9, 2012, he was traded to the Phillies in exchange for pitcher Josh Lindblom and minor league pitcher Lisalverto Bonilla. The deal reunited him with former teammates Laynce Nix, Cliff Lee and Mike Adams. The Phillies were monitoring Young for some time before his acquisition. Their former Hall of Fame third baseman Mike Schmidt said, "we got a Derek Jeter kind of player on our team all of a sudden ... He's two or three Michael Young years away from being a Hall of Famer, first ballot maybe." Phillies general manager Rubén Amaro, Jr. and manager Charlie Manuel also were fond of Young and made him a target heading into the Winter Meetings. Once they agreed to a deal, Young had to approve it, which he did, later mentioning that he would only have done so to go to a winning team like the Phillies. The Phillies viewed Young as a stop-gap to get them to top prospect Cody Asche.

In 126 games with the Phillies, he hit .276 with 8 homers and 42 RBI. However, the Phillies did not turn out to be the "winning team" that Young had expected. On August 31, the Phillies' record stood at 62–74, and they were 21 1/2 games out of first place and 14 games out of the last available playoff spot. He was traded to the Los Angeles Dodgers. Upon leaving Philadelphia, Young released a statement in which he thanked the Phillies and said that he "had a blast" playing in Philadelphia and that he would recommend it "in a heartbeat" to any other player. Phillies players, namely younger players such as Darin Ruf and Cody Asche, commented that they loved having a veteran like Young to whom they could look up and seek advice from. Ruf said, "He was the type of guy to come up to a younger guy like myself or Cody and tell us a thing or two about what he thinks we need to do and how he thinks we could prolong our careers. He was just a great teammate to have around."

=== Los Angeles Dodgers (2013) ===
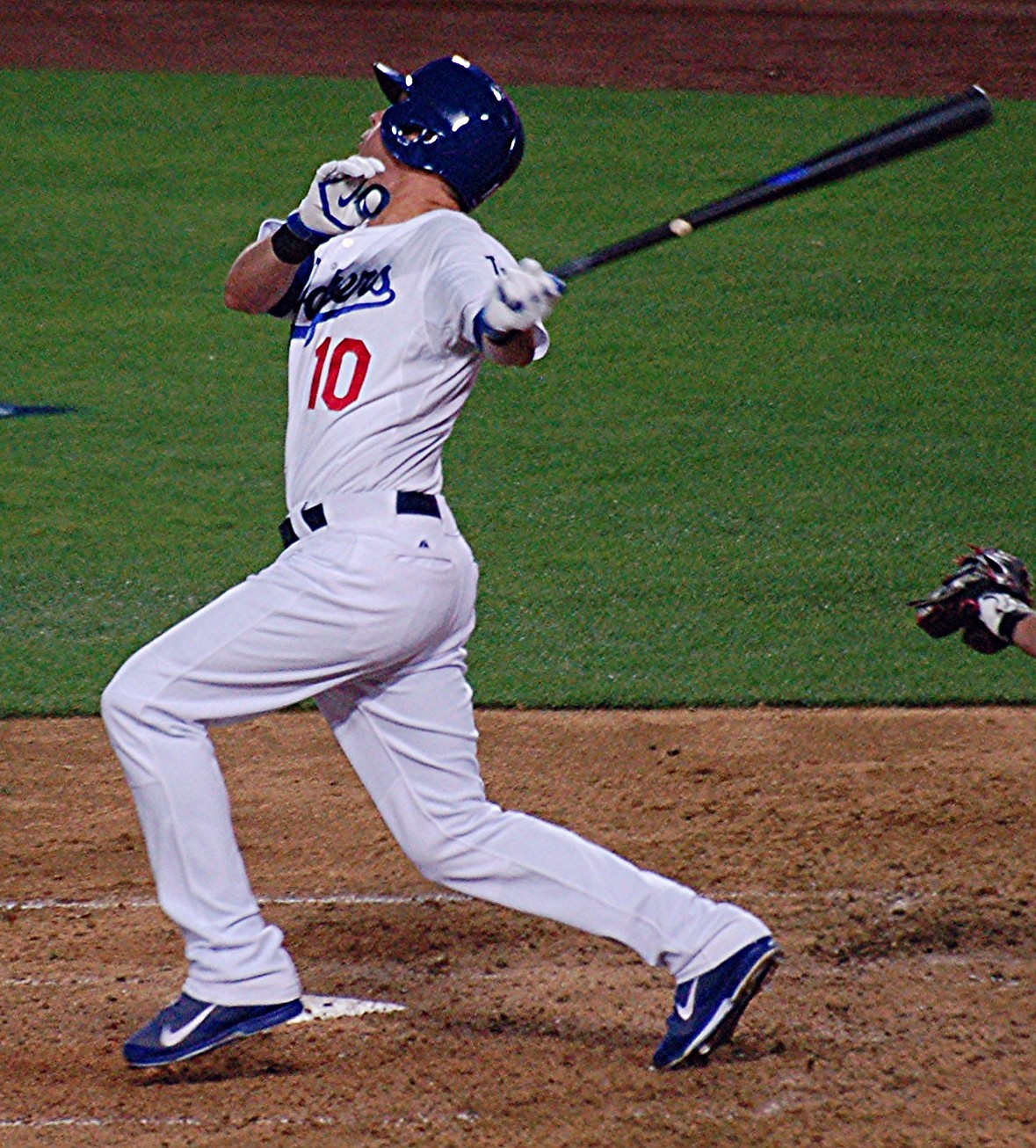
Young with the Dodgers in 2013

On August 31, 2013, he was traded to the Los Angeles Dodgers for minor league pitcher Rob Rasmussen. In the last year of his contract, Young again waived his no-trade clause to join his hometown team for an expected playoff run. Young was acquired to be a backup infielder and provide a veteran presence on the team. Young made his Dodgers debut on September 1, 2013 pinch hitting in a game against the Colorado Rockies. He appeared in 21 games for the Dodgers at a variety of positions and hit .314. Young played his last regular-season game in the major leagues on September 29, exactly 13 years to the day he made his major league debut.

After initially considering some offers as a free agent (reportedly as a bench player), Young announced his retirement from baseball on January 31, 2014

=== Career statistics ===
In 1970 games over 14 seasons, Young posted a .300 batting average (2375-for-7918) with 1137 runs, 441 doubles, 60 triples, 185 home runs, 1030 RBI, 90 stolen bases, 575 bases on balls, .346 on-base percentage and .441 slugging percentage. He finished his career with a .979 fielding percentage playing at all four infield positions. In 43 postseason games, he batted .238 (36-for-151) with 11 runs, 10 doubles, 3 home runs, 19 RBI and 5 walks.

== Post-playing career ==
On November 5, 2014, Young was hired by the Texas Rangers as a special assistant to general manager Jon Daniels. He played a key role in the offseason acquisition of Ian Desmond in 2016.

On July 30, 2016, Young was inducted into the Texas Rangers Baseball Hall of Fame in a pregame ceremony before the team's matchup with the Kansas City Royals.

Young was eligible to be elected into the Hall of Fame in 2019, but received less than 5% of the vote and became ineligible for the 2020 ballot.

On August 31, 2019, the Texas Rangers retired Michael Young's #10.

Young served as the manager for the National League team in the 2024 All-Star Futures Game.

== Personal life ==
Young's mother is of Mexican descent. Young met his wife Cristina, also Mexican-American, in high school. They have three sons named Mateo, Emilio, and Antonio respectively. Young is a cousin of former WBO Light Welterweight boxing champion Zack Padilla. Another cousin, Jason Young, played minor league baseball.

Young is a philanthropist. He and his wife are sponsors of the Wipe Out Kids' Cancer campaign. In 2006, Young began the Young Heroes Scholarship Program, and in 2010, the Michael Young Family Hispanic Scholarship Program was established. In July 2011, Young and his wife announced the launch of the Michael Young Family Foundation, a charity that supports the involvement of children's health in all areas: physical social, mental, and educational. Young is represented by baseball agent Dan Lozano.

Young is a two-time winner of the Marvin Miller Man of the Year Award winning in 2008 and 2011. He is one of only five players who have won multiple times (John Smoltz, Jim Thome, Curtis Granderson, and Marcus Semien). In 2021, he donated $50,000 to help with the restoration of the Reverchon Park Ball Field in Dallas. Young's hobbies include billiards and golf.

== See also ==
- List of Major League Baseball batting champions
- List of Major League Baseball hit records
- List of Major League Baseball retired numbers
