= Juan Melo =

Dominican baseball player (born 1976)

- Second baseman
- Born: November 11, 1976; Bani, Peravia, Dominican Republic
- Batted: Both Threw: Right

MLB debut
- September 2, 2000, for the San Francisco Giants

Last MLB appearance
- October 1, 2000, for the San Francisco Giants

MLB statistics
- Games played: 11
- At bats: 13
- Hits: 1

CPBL statistics
- Batting average: .316
- Home runs: 3
- Runs batted in: 16
- Stats at Baseball Reference

Teams
- San Francisco Giants (2000); Chinatrust Whales (2003)

Juan Esteban Melo (born November 11, 1976) is a Dominican former second baseman in Major League Baseball. He played for the San Francisco Giants.
