= Tom Davey (baseball) =

American baseball player

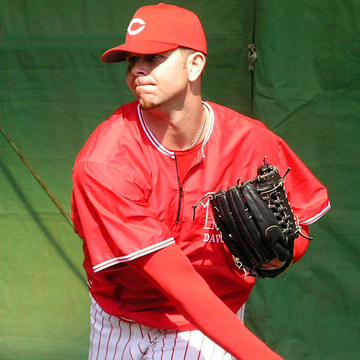
- Davey with Carp in 2004
- Pitcher
- Born: September 11, 1973 (age 52); Garden City, Michigan, U.S.
- Batted: Right Threw: Right

Professional debut
- MLB: April 6, 1999, for the Toronto Blue Jays
- NPB: July 4, 2003, for the Hiroshima Toyo Carp

Last appearance
- MLB: August 24, 2002, for the San Diego Padres
- NPB: September 22, 2007, for the Orix Buffaloes

MLB statistics
- Win–loss record: 7–6
- Earned run average: 4.41
- Strikeouts: 123

NPB statistics
- Win–loss record: 32–31
- Earned run average: 3.15
- Strikeouts: 320
- Stats at Baseball Reference

Teams
- Toronto Blue Jays (1999); Seattle Mariners (1999); San Diego Padres (2000–2002); Hiroshima Toyo Carp (2003–2005); Orix Buffaloes (2006–2007)

Thomas Joseph Davey (born September 11, 1973) is an American former professional baseball pitcher. At 6'7", Davey was a right-handed relief pitcher for three years with the Toronto Blue Jays (1999), Seattle Mariners (1999), and San Diego Padres (2000–2002) of Major League Baseball. He then pitched in Nippon Professional Baseball in Japan.

== Career ==
Davey was drafted by the Blue Jays in the 5th round of the 1994 Major League Baseball draft out of Henry Ford Community College. He was a South Atlantic League All-Star in 1996. That December, the Baltimore Orioles claimed Davey in the Rule 5 draft but returned him to the Blue Jays the following March during spring training.

Davey debuted on Opening Day with the Blue Jays in 1999, striking out two in a perfect inning. That July, he was traded with reliever Steve Sinclair to the Seattle Mariners for first baseman David Segui. Davey pitched in a career-high 45 games in his rookie season, with a 2–1 record and 4.71 ERA in 65 innings. He was considered a "closer of the future" but never pitched in Seattle again.

Davey started the 2000 season with the Triple-A Tacoma Rainiers, working partly as a starting pitcher. On July 31, the Mariners traded him and John Mabry to the San Diego Padres for Al Martin. He was a September call-up for the Padres, pitching 12 scoreless innings to begin his National League tenure. He had a 0.71 ERA in 11 games for San Diego. He had a 4.50 ERA in 38 games in the first four months of 2001, but an injury ended his season. He split 2002, his final season in the majors, between San Diego and the Triple-A Portland Beavers.

Davey pitched for the Hiroshima Toyo Carp of Nippon Professional Baseball from 2003 until 2005 and for the Orix Buffaloes from 2006 until 2007. He did not pitch in the 2008 season for the Buffaloes because of shoulder surgery. He was released by the Buffaloes on August 11, 2008. He was signed by the Camden Riversharks of the Atlantic League on April 7, 2009.

Davey underwent a fourth shoulder surgery in early 2010, and while he hoped to attempt another comeback, the repair did not heal well enough to allow him to continue pitching.
