= Clayton Andrews (baseball, born 1978) =

American baseball player (born 1978)

- Pitcher
- Born: May 15, 1978 (age 47); Dunedin, Florida, U.S.
- Batted: Right Threw: Left

MLB debut
- April 16, 2000, for the Toronto Blue Jays

Last MLB appearance
- June 13, 2000, for the Toronto Blue Jays

MLB statistics
- Win–loss record: 1–2
- Earned run average: 10.02
- Strikeouts: 12
- Stats at Baseball Reference

Teams
- Toronto Blue Jays (2000)

Clayton Andrews (born May 15, 1978) is an American former left-handed pitcher in Major League Baseball.

Andrews was taken in the third round of the 1996 amateur draft by the Toronto Blue Jays. His only major league appearances came with the Blue Jays in the 2000 season, where he racked up an ERA of 10.02 in 20 2/3 innings. His record in eight games was 1–2 with one game finished. His lone major league win came on May 28 against the Detroit Tigers at Comerica Park where he pitched 4 hitless, scoreless innings of relief in a 12-7 Blue Jays victory.

He was traded to the Cincinnati Reds after the 2000 season with Leo Estrella for Steve Parris, and last pitched professionally in 2007 for the Lancaster Barnstormers of the Atlantic League of Professional Baseball.
