= Steve Sinclair =

Canadian baseball player (born 1971)

- Pitcher
- Born: August 2, 1971 (age 54); Victoria, British Columbia, Canada
- Batted: Left Threw: Left

MLB debut
- April 25, 1998, for the Toronto Blue Jays

Last MLB appearance
- October 3, 1999, for the Seattle Mariners

MLB statistics
- Win–loss record: 0–3
- Earned run average: 5.24
- Strikeouts: 26
- Stats at Baseball Reference

Teams
- Toronto Blue Jays (1998–1999); Seattle Mariners (1999)

Steven Scott Sinclair (born August 2, 1971) is a Canadian former pitcher for the Toronto Blue Jays and Seattle Mariners.

The Blue Jays drafted Sinclair in the 28th round of the 1991 MLB draft out of Kwantlen Polytechnic University in Langley, British Columbia. Sinclair made his major league debut for the Blue Jays on April 25, 1998, against the Chicago White Sox and pitched in 24 games that season. On July 28, 1999, he was traded to the Mariners with Tom Davey in exchange for David Segui. He pitched in 18 games for Seattle, ending his major league tenure. He continued to pitch in the minor leagues through 2003, though he dealt with an elbow injury.

Sinclair currently holds the records for saves by a left handed reliever (15) while playing in the Venezuelan Winter League for the Cardenales de Lara. He is the cousin of All-Star and 2006 American League MVP Justin Morneau. Sinclair was inducted into the Greater Victoria Sports Hall of Fame in 2015.
