= Eric Ludwick =

American baseball player (born 1971)

- Pitcher
- Born: December 14, 1971 (age 54); Whiteman Air Force Base, Missouri, U.S.
- Batted: Right Threw: Right

Professional debut
- MLB: September 1, 1996, for the St. Louis Cardinals
- NPB: July 6, 2000, for the Hiroshima Toyo Carp

Last appearance
- MLB: April 8, 1999, for the Toronto Blue Jays
- NPB: September 12, 2001, for the Hiroshima Toyo Carp

MLB statistics
- Win–loss record: 2–10
- Earned run average: 8.35
- Strikeouts: 60

NPB statistics
- Win–loss record: 3–6
- Earned run average: 5.29
- Strikeouts: 79
- Stats at Baseball Reference

Teams
- St. Louis Cardinals (1996–1997); Oakland Athletics (1997); Florida Marlins (1998); Toronto Blue Jays (1999); Hiroshima Toyo Carp (2000–2001)

Eric David Ludwick (born December 14, 1971) is an American former Major League Baseball (MLB) pitcher who played for the Oakland Athletics, St. Louis Cardinals, Florida Marlins, and Toronto Blue Jays between 1996 and 1999. He also played two seasons in Japan for the Hiroshima Toyo Carp in 2000 and 2001. In the middle of the 1997 season, Ludwick was part of a trade with between the cash-strapped Oakland Athletics and the St. Louis Cardinals that sent Mark McGwire to the Cardinals in exchange for Ludwick, T.J. Matthews, and Blake Stein.

== Biography ==
Ludwick attended the University of Nevada-Las Vegas, and in 1992 he played collegiate summer baseball with the Harwich Mariners of the Cape Cod Baseball League.

He was selected by the New York Mets in the second round of the 1993 MLB draft.

Ludwick is the brother of retired major league outfielder Ryan Ludwick.
