= Andy Thompson (baseball) =

American baseball player (born 1975)

- Left fielder
- Born: October 8, 1975 (age 50); Oconomowoc, Wisconsin, U.S.
- Batted: Right Threw: Right

MLB debut
- May 2, 2000, for the Toronto Blue Jays

Last MLB appearance
- May 4, 2000, for the Toronto Blue Jays

MLB statistics
- Batting average: .167
- Home runs: 0
- Runs batted in: 1
- Stats at Baseball Reference

Teams
- Toronto Blue Jays (2000)

Andrew John Thompson (born October 8, 1975) is a former Major League Baseball left fielder who played for the Toronto Blue Jays in 2000.

Thompson was drafted straight out of Sun Prairie High School by the Toronto Blue Jays in the 23rd round of the 1994 Major League Baseball draft. His best minor league season came in 1999 when he hit 31 home runs and had 95 RBI for Double-A Knoxville and Triple-A Syracuse. He started 2000 with Triple-A Syracuse, but was briefly promoted to the majors in May where he had 1 hit in the only 2 games of his major league career. He played in Toronto's organization again in 2001 and played 2002, his final season, in the St. Louis Cardinals and Tampa Bay Devil Rays organizations.
