= Mike Romano (baseball) =

American baseball player (born 1972)

- Pitcher
- Born: March 3, 1972 (age 54); New Orleans, Louisiana, U.S.
- Batted: Right Threw: Right

Professional debut
- MLB: September 5, 1999, for the Toronto Blue Jays
- NPB: April 3, 2005, for the Hiroshima Toyo Carp
- KBO: 2007, for the SK Wyverns

Last appearance
- MLB: September 24, 1999, for the Toronto Blue Jays
- NPB: September 27, 2006, for the Hiroshima Toyo Carp
- KBO: 2007, for the SK Wyverns

MLB statistics
- Win–loss record: 0–0
- Earned run average: 11.81
- Strikeouts: 3
- Stats at Baseball Reference

Teams
- Toronto Blue Jays (1999); Hiroshima Toyo Carp (2005–2006); SK Wyverns (2007)

Michael Desport Romano (born March 3, 1972) is an American former Major League Baseball pitcher who played for one season. He pitched for the Toronto Blue Jays for three games during its 1999 season.

== See also ==
- 1992 College Baseball All-America Team
