= Leo Estrella =

Dominican baseball player (born 1975)

- Pitcher
- Born: February 20, 1975 (age 51); Puerta Plata, Dominican Republic
- Batted: Right Threw: Right

MLB debut
- July 18, 2000, for the Toronto Blue Jays

Last MLB appearance
- April 7, 2004, for the San Francisco Giants

MLB statistics
- Win–loss record: 7–3
- Earned run average: 4.88
- Strikeouts: 28
- Stats at Baseball Reference

Teams
- Toronto Blue Jays (2000); Milwaukee Brewers (2003); San Francisco Giants (2004)

Leoncio Estrella (born February 20, 1975) is a Dominican former Major League Baseball pitcher who played for the Toronto Blue Jays (2000), Milwaukee Brewers (2003), and San Francisco Giants (2004).
