= David Segui =

American baseball player (born 1966)

Leones de Yucatán
- First baseman / Coach
- Born: July 19, 1966 (age 59); Kansas City, Kansas, U.S.
- Batted: Switch Threw: Left

MLB debut
- May 8, 1990, for the Baltimore Orioles

Last MLB appearance
- September 8, 2004, for the Baltimore Orioles

MLB statistics
- Batting average: .291
- Home runs: 139
- Runs batted in: 684
- Stats at Baseball Reference

Teams
- Baltimore Orioles (1990–1993); New York Mets (1994–1995); Montreal Expos (1995–1997); Seattle Mariners (1998–1999); Toronto Blue Jays (1999); Texas Rangers (2000); Cleveland Indians (2000); Baltimore Orioles (2001–2004)

David Vincent Segui (/sɪˈɡiː/; born July 19, 1966) is an American former professional baseball first baseman who currently serves as a hitting coach for the Leones de Yucatán of the Mexican League. During a 15-year Major League Baseball (MLB) career, he played for the Baltimore Orioles, New York Mets, Montreal Expos, Seattle Mariners, Toronto Blue Jays, Texas Rangers, and Cleveland Indians.

== Playing career ==
Segui was born in Kansas City, Kansas, the son of former MLB pitcher Diego Seguí. He graduated from Bishop Ward High School then played college baseball for Kansas City Kansas Community College and the Louisiana Tech Bulldogs.

The Orioles drafted Segui in the 18th round of the 1987 MLB draft. He was named the Orioles' minor league player of the year in 1989, then an International League mid-season and post-season All-Star in 1990 after batting .336 with the Rochester Red Wings. Segui also made his MLB debut in 1990, batting .244 with two home runs in 40 games. He became the Orioles regular first baseman in 1993 after being a part-time player and playing the outfield the previous two seasons.

After the Orioles signed Rafael Palmeiro, they traded Segui to the Mets for Kevin Baez and Tom Wegmann in March 1994. Segui started the 1995 season batting .329 for the Mets, then New York traded him to the Expos for Reid Cornelius in June. Segui was named the Expos player of the month that June and July, and the local Baseball Writers' Association of America chapter named him the team's player of the year. He was named the National League (NL) Player of the Week for April 15–21, 1996. He missed games in 1997 due to a left knee injury and hit .307 with a career-high 21 home runs.

Segui signed a two-year, $4.75 million contract with the Mariners that December. He got in a fight with teammate Randy Johnson before a game in June 1998. Segui had one of his best seasons in his only full season with Seattle in 1998, batting .305 with 19 home runs and 84 runs batted in (RBI). The Mariners traded Segui to the Blue Jays for pitchers Tom Davey and Steve Sinclair in July 1999. He played in only 31 games for Toronto, due to fracturing a pinkie in his throwing hand. He agreed to salary arbitration to return to the Blue Jays in 2000, but the team traded him to the Rangers as part of a three-team trade including the Expos.

Segui was primarily a designated hitter with Texas, as Palmeiro was the team's first baseman in 2000. The Rangers traded Segui to the Cleveland in July for pitcher Ricky Ledee. Segui hit a career-high .334 with 104 RBI with Texas and Cleveland.

Segui signed a four-year, $28 million contract with the Orioles ahead of the 2001 season. He did not play a full season in his second stint with the Orioles due to injuries. He dealt with a sore left knee in 2001, requiring offseason surgery, then a left hand injury in 2002, and injuries to his right hand, left wrist, and hamstring in 2003. Another knee injury forced him to miss most of his final MLB season in 2004.

In 1,456 games over 15 seasons, Segui posted a .291 batting average with 683 runs, 284 doubles, 139 home runs, 684 RBI, 524 bases on balls, .359 on-base percentage and .443 slugging percentage. He recorded a .995 fielding percentage primarily as a first baseman, but also played 100 games at left and right field. Segui was generally regarded as a good fielding first baseman. He did not play in any postseason games and was the active leader in MLB games played without a postseason appearance before he retired.

Segui played for the independent Kansas City T-Bones in 2005.

== Coaching career ==
On May 20, 2026, Segui was hired to serve as a hitting coach for the Leones de Yucatán of the Mexican League.

== Steroids ==
Segui was identified by Jason Grimsley as one of the players who had taken human growth hormone during his major league career (he was one of the players whose name was redacted on Grimsley's document). Unlike others, however, Segui had a doctor's prescription for HGH to counter a deficiency he had been diagnosed with and had previously admitted to using them.

Segui admitted to using anabolic steroids in 1994 while with the Mets, obtaining them from former clubhouse attendant Kirk Radomski. Segui never had any spikes in his performances or home runs, but says he knows about other ballplayers' usage. He was included in the Mitchell Report, which named people who were found using either HGH, steroids, or some other type of PEDs.

== Personal life ==
Segui's father Diego also had a 15-season MLB career, pitching for the Mariners, Seattle Pilots, and four other franchises. His brother played in the minor leagues with the Mets.

Segui has been married twice. His son Corey played in the minors with the Orioles from 2012 to 2014. He has one other child with his first wife and two children with his second wife. Segui reportedly dated Seattle broadcaster Angie Mentink.

== See also ==
- List of second-generation Major League Baseball players
- List of Major League Baseball players named in the Mitchell Report
- List of Cuban Americans
