= John Frascatore =

American baseball player (born 1970)

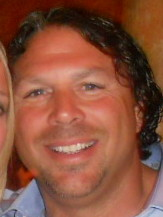
- Frascatore in 2011
- Pitcher
- Born: February 4, 1970 (age 55); Ozone Park, New York, U.S.
- Batted: Right Threw: Right

MLB debut
- July 21, 1996, for the St. Louis Cardinals

Last MLB appearance
- May 9, 2001, for the Toronto Blue Jays

MLB statistics
- Win–loss record: 20–17
- Earned run average: 4.00
- Strikeouts: 206
- Stats at Baseball Reference

Teams
- St. Louis Cardinals (1994–1995, 1997–1998); Arizona Diamondbacks (1999); Toronto Blue Jays (1999–2001); Uni-President Lions (2003)

John Vincent Frascatore (born February 4, 1970) is an American former professional baseball pitcher who pitched in the Major Leagues from 1994 to 2001. He played for the St. Louis Cardinals (1994–95, 1997–98), Arizona Diamondbacks (1999) and Toronto Blue Jays (1999–2001). In 274 games, Frascatore compiled a 20–17 record with 206 strikeouts and a 4.00 ERA. In 1999 for the Toronto Blue Jays John tied a major league record by pitching in three consecutive days and recording three wins on those three days. He was known for his endurance and throughout his career was never on the disabled list. In 2003 Frascatore retired and went overseas to Taiwan to join Uni-President Lions where he recorded a 1.80 ERA and won the ERA award.

Frascatore was also the baseball director of Camp Wayne For Boys, located in Preston Park, Pennsylvania, from 2013 to 2018.
