= Anthony Sanders =

American baseball player & coach (born 1974)

- Outfielder / Coach
- Born: March 2, 1974 (age 52); Tucson, Arizona, U.S.
- Batted: Right Threw: Right

Professional debut
- MLB: April 26, 1999, for the Toronto Blue Jays
- NPB: May 29, 2001, for the Yokohama BayStars

Last appearance
- MLB: April 18, 2001, for the Seattle Mariners
- NPB: August 16, 2001, for the Yokohama BayStars

MLB statistics
- Batting average: .240
- Home runs: 0
- Runs batted in: 4

NPB statistics
- Batting average: .114
- Home runs: 1
- Runs batted in: 1
- Stats at Baseball Reference

Teams
- As player: Toronto Blue Jays (1999); Seattle Mariners (2000–2001); Yokohama BayStars (2001); As coach: Baltimore Orioles (2020–2025); Detroit Tigers (2026)
Medals
Men's baseball
Representing the United States
Olympic Games
Gold medal – first place	2000 Sydney	Team competition

Anthony Marcus Sanders (born March 2, 1974) is an American professional baseball former outfielder and coach. He most recently served as the first base coach for the Detroit Tigers of Major League Baseball (MLB). He played in MLB for the Toronto Blue Jays and Seattle Mariners, and in Nippon Professional Baseball (NPB) for the Yokohama BayStars.

== Career ==
As a member of the United States national baseball team, Sanders won a gold medal at the 2000 Summer Olympics. In 1997, Sanders' wife was killed in a skiing accident. He joined the Colorado Rockies organization as the Tri-City ValleyCats hitting coach in 2007, and served in that role through 2012. In 2013, Sanders was promoted to manager of the Grand Junction Rockies of the Rookie-level Pioneer League, and was named the circuit's 2014 manager of the year. He spent the 2013 through 2015 seasons as the Grand Junction manager. Sanders served as the supervisor with the High-A Lancaster JetHawks in 2016 and 2017. In the latter of those two seasons, the JetHawks achieved 326 stolen bases, with at least 30 each from six of its players including Garrett Hampson, Sam Hilliard and Yonathan Daza. In 2018 and 2019, Sanders served as the Rockies outfield and baserunning coordinator.

Sanders was named the Baltimore Orioles' first base coach following the 2019 season.

On November 5, 2025, the Detroit Tigers hired Sanders to serve as the team's first base coach. On September 29, 2026, it was announced that the Tigers would be parting ways with Sanders.
