= Norberto Martin =

Dominican baseball player (born 1966)

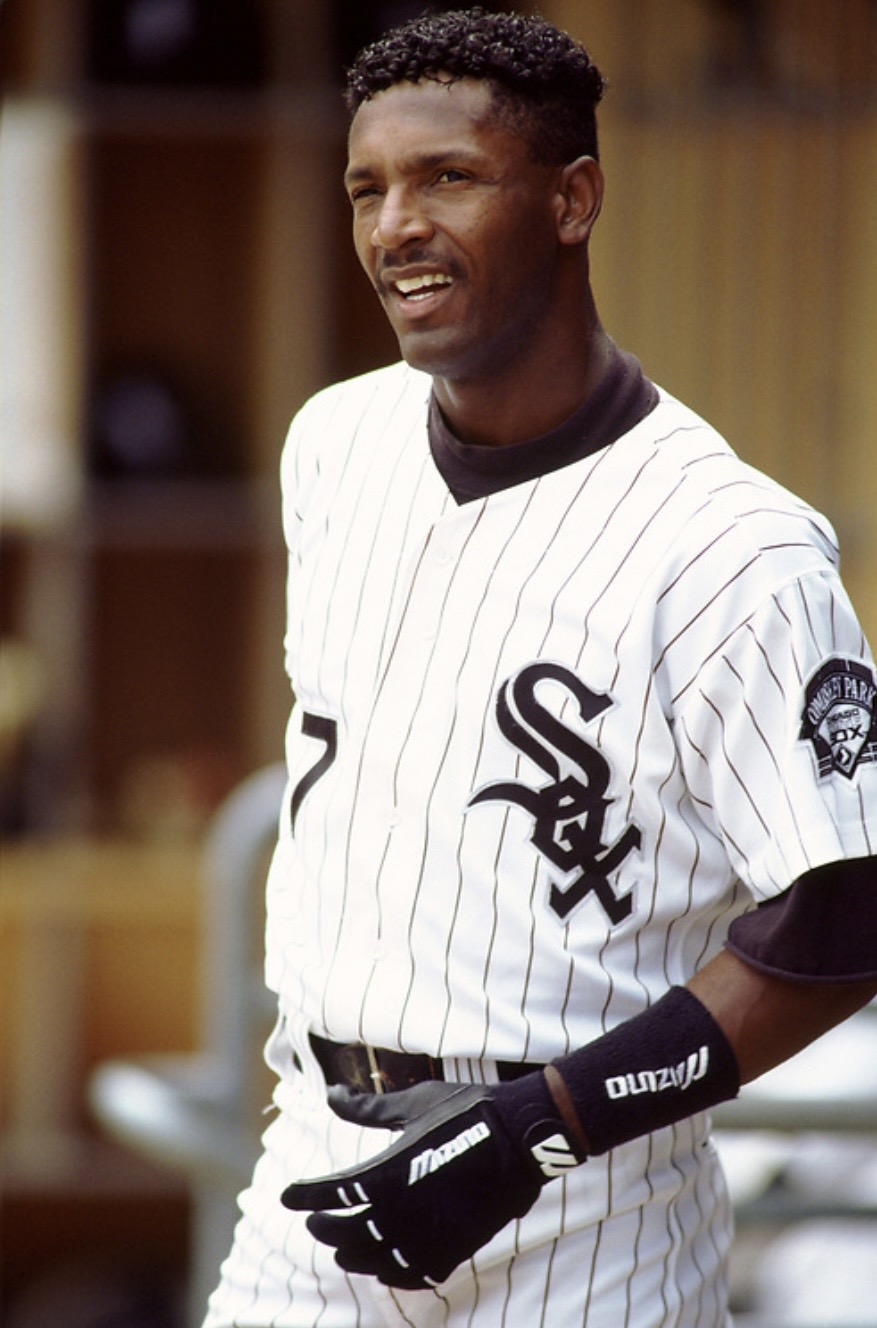
Norberto "Paco" Martin
- Infielder
- Born: December 10, 1966 (age 59); San Pedro de Macorís, Dominican Republic
- Batted: Right Threw: Right

MLB debut
- September 20, 1993, for the Chicago White Sox

Last MLB appearance
- May 4, 1999, for the Toronto Blue Jays

MLB statistics
- Batting average: .278
- Home runs: 7
- Runs batted in: 89
- Stats at Baseball Reference

Teams
- Chicago White Sox (1993–1997); Anaheim Angels (1998); Toronto Blue Jays (1999)

Norberto Enrique "Paco" Martin McDonald (born December 10, 1966) is a Dominican former professional baseball infielder. He played seven seasons in Major League Baseball from 1993 to 1999.

== Career ==
The White Sox signed him on March 27, 1984, though it would be nearly a decade before he made his MLB debut.

Primarily a shortstop, Martin worked his way up through the minors but was plagued by injuries, which made him miss significant time in 1986.

Entering 1991, he was ranked No. 4 on the White Sox top 10 prospect list (per Baseball America). In 1993, Martin had a great season, hitting .309 and being voted best defensive second baseman in the American Association by Baseball America.

Martin’s MLB debut finally came Sept. 20, 1993 when he pinch ran for Frank Thomas and scored a run on a Robin Ventura double. The first hit came Sept. 28 – a single off Tim Leary. The next day, in only his fifth MLB game and seventh MLB plate appearance, he recorded his second hit - a walk-off single in the 12th inning, giving the White Sox a 3-2 win over the Mariners. He finished the season 5-for-14 (.357) in eight games.

Martin’s first big league home run came on June 4, 1994 – a ninth inning grand slam off Jim Poole in Baltimore. He’s one of eight players in White Sox history whose first career MLB home run was a grand slam.

The 1996 season was his best. In 70 games, Martin hit .350/.374/.421; that batting average was second in the AL to Alex Rodriguez among players with at least 140 at-bats. Frank Thomas was third with .349. In addition, Paco remains one of four players in White Sox history to hit .350 and steal 10+ bases in a season.

Martin went on to play with the Angels and played a career-high 79 games, but he wasn’t the same player, hitting only .215. He played nine games for the Blue Jays in 1999 in what would be the end of his MLB career. He continued to play in the minors, in addition to a stint in Mexico, for a few more years.

After his playing career, he became an instructor at the Academy of Pro Players in New Jersey, where he taught for a few years. He served as the hitting coach for the Helena Brewers in 2004 and from 2007 to 2008; Martin served in the same capacity for the Asheville Tourists, the Class A affiliate of the Colorado Rockies from 2017 to 2019.

———

It has been claimed by Keith Bodie that Martin was involved in a triple play in a 1986 spring training game where no one touched the ball.

== Personal life ==
Norberto Martin is married to Judith Carrero with whom he has three kids: Nicolle Martin, Norberto Martin Jr., and Michelle Martin.

He now resides in Raleigh, North Carolina.
