= Adam Melhuse =

American baseball player and coach (born 1972)

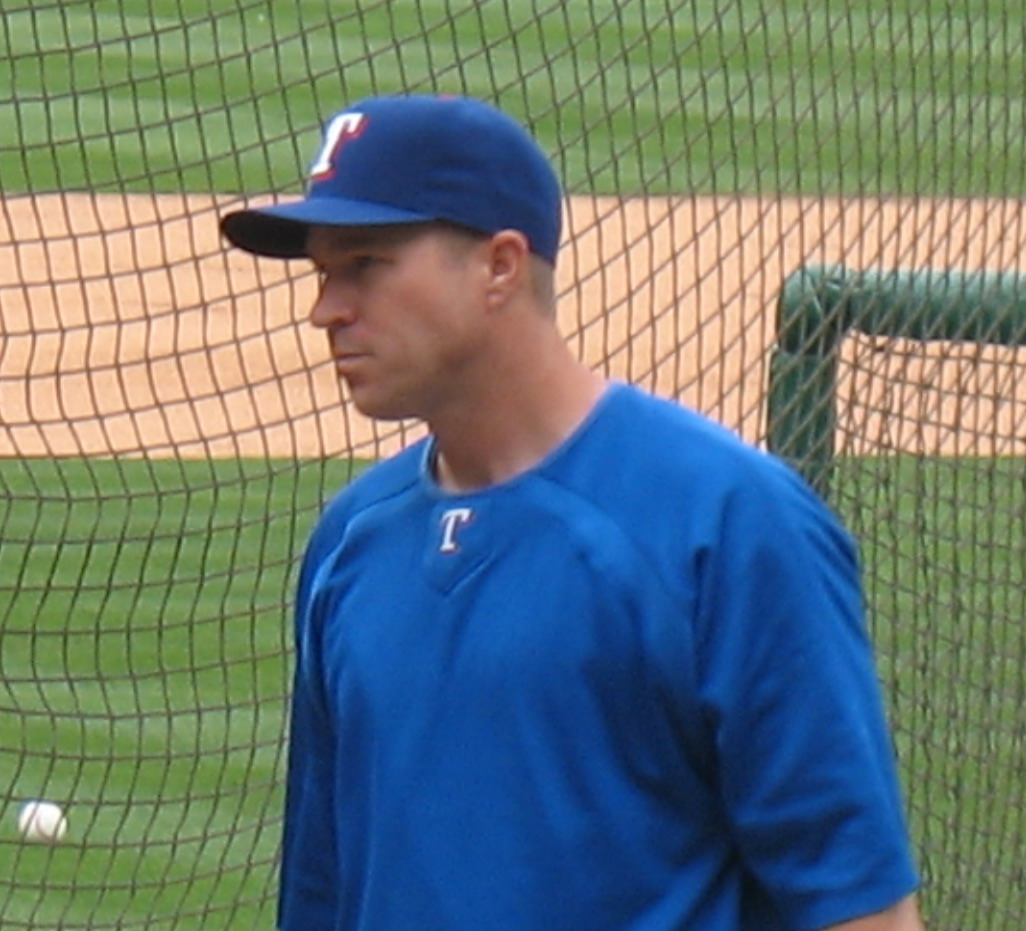
- Melhuse with the Texas Rangers
- Catcher
- Born: March 27, 1972 (age 54); Santa Clara, California, U.S.
- Batted: Switch Threw: Right

MLB debut
- June 16, 2000, for the Los Angeles Dodgers

Last MLB appearance
- September 27, 2008, for the Colorado Rockies

MLB statistics
- Batting average: .234
- Home runs: 24
- Runs batted in: 98
- Stats at Baseball Reference

Teams
- Los Angeles Dodgers (2000); Colorado Rockies (2000–2001); Oakland Athletics (2003–2007); Texas Rangers (2007–2008); Colorado Rockies (2008)

Adam Michael Melhuse (born March 27, 1972) is an American former professional baseball catcher. He played in Major League Baseball (MLB) for the Los Angeles Dodgers, Colorado Rockies, Oakland Athletics and Texas Rangers. He was the hitting coach for the Detroit Tigers AAA Toledo Mud Hens.

== High school, college years ==
Melhuse attended Lincoln High School in Stockton, California and was a student and a letterman in basketball and baseball. He was 1991 West Coast Conference Freshman of the Year in baseball at Santa Clara before transferring to UCLA. In 1991, he played collegiate summer baseball with the Harwich Mariners of the Cape Cod Baseball League, and returned to the league in 1992 to play for the Brewster Whitecaps.

== Major League Baseball career ==
Previously, Melhuse played with the Los Angeles Dodgers, Colorado Rockies, Oakland Athletics, and Texas Rangers. He throws right-handed and is a switch-hitter.

=== Colorado Rockies ===
Melhuse collected his first career hit on August 22, 2000, in the 12th inning of an unusual game between the Rockies and Atlanta Braves. Out of pitchers, Rockies manager, Buddy Bell, asked injured catcher, Brent Mayne, who was unable to swing a bat due to a sprained left wrist, if he could pitch. Mayne pitched the 12th inning and held the Braves scoreless. The following inning, with two outs and the bases loaded, Melhuse, pinch hitting for Mayne, singled off of Stan Belinda over shortstop Walt Weiss' head to win the game in walk-off fashion by a score of 8-7. This victory also earned Mayne a pitching win in what would be his only career outing on the mound.

=== Oakland Athletics ===
On November 6, 2002 Melhuse signed a minor league contract with the Oakland Athletics. He would spend four seasons with the club as a backup to Damian Miller and later Jason Kendall, with his best year coming in 2004 when he hit .257/.309/.463 with 11 home runs and 31 RBI in 69 games.

=== Texas Rangers ===
On June 10, 2007, Melhuse was traded by the Athletics to the Texas Rangers for cash. Adam's career as a Texas Ranger was short-lived, as the club traded for fellow catcher Jarrod Saltalamacchia on July 31, 2007, which lessened Melhuse's playing time. Melhuse was designated for assignment on August 24, 2007, and would later be released.

=== Oakland Athletics (second stint) ===
He re-signed with the Athletics for his second stint in 2007 on September 1 when rosters were expanded. Despite being on the Athletics for a second go-around in September, Melhuse sat on the bench the whole time and did not get into a game. He declared free agency on October 8, 2007, though not before being outrighted to the minors on October 5.

=== Texas Rangers (second stint) ===
on January 11, 2008 Melhuse signed a minor league contract with an invitation to spring training with the Texas Rangers. He made the team out of spring training as a backup to starting catcher Gerald Laird, but injured his hand in a game against the Detroit Tigers on April 24, resulting in his release.

=== Colorado Rockies (second stint) ===
In late June 2008, Melhuse signed a minor league contract with the Colorado Rockies and was called up on August 14, 2008. On August 30, 2008, Melhuse was called up to the Rockies from the Triple-A Sky Sox to replace Yorvit Torrealba who was placed on the DL.

=== Texas Rangers (third stint) ===
Melhuse signed a minor league contract with the Texas Rangers in January 2009. However, he was released on April 4.

=== Pittsburgh Pirates ===
On May 8, 2009, he signed a minor league contract with the Pittsburgh Pirates.

=== Retirement ===
On June 17, 2009 Melhuse announced his retirement.

=== Post-playing career ===
Melhuse spent four seasons as an advance scout for the Chicago Cubs and two seasons in the Los Angeles Angels system as manager of the Burlington Bees. In 2018, he joined the Los Angeles Dodgers organization as hitting coach for the Oklahoma City Dodgers. He was transferred to the Tulsa Drillers for 2019.
