= Darwin Cubillán =

Venezuelan baseball player (born 1972)

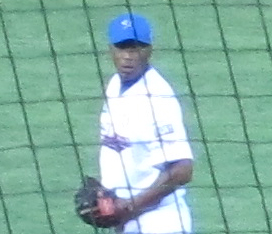
- Cubillán pitching for San Marino BBC in 2012
- Relief pitcher
- Born: November 15, 1972 (age 53); Bobures, Zulia State, Venezuela
- Batted: Right Threw: Right

Professional debut
- MLB: May 20, 2000, for the Toronto Blue Jays
- NPB: 2005, for the Hanshin Tigers
- KBO: 2008, for the SK Wyverns

Last appearance
- MLB: June 1, 2004, for the Baltimore Orioles
- NPB: 2007, for the Hanshin Tigers
- KBO: 2008, for the SK Wyverns

MLB statistics
- Win–loss record: 1–0
- Earned run average: 6.85
- Strikeouts: 54

NPB statistics
- Win–loss record: 3–5
- Earned run average: 3.76
- Strikeouts: 101

KBO statistics
- Win–loss record: 1–2
- Earned run average: 12.86
- Strikeouts: 3
- Stats at Baseball Reference

Teams
- Toronto Blue Jays (2000); Texas Rangers (2000); Montreal Expos (2001); Baltimore Orioles (2004); Hanshin Tigers (2005–2007); SK Wyverns (2008)

Darwin Harrikson Cubillán Salom [coo-be-yahn' / sah-lom'] (born November 15, 1972) is a Venezuelan former professional baseball right-handed relief pitcher. He played in Major League Baseball (MLB) for the Toronto Blue Jays, Texas Rangers, Montreal Expos, and Baltimore Orioles. He also played in Nippon Professional Baseball (NPB) for the Hanshin Tigers, and in the KBO League for the SK Wyverns.

== Career ==
Originally signed as a free agent by the Yankees in 1993, Cubillán has played in MLB for the Toronto Blue Jays (2000), Texas Rangers (2000), Montreal Expos (2001) and Baltimore Orioles (2004). In three-season career, Cubillán compiled a 1–0 record with 54 strikeouts and a 6.85 ERA.

Cubillán played in Japan for the Hanshin Tigers of the Central League, Nippon Professional Baseball (NPB) from 2005 until 2007. He played using his first name "Darwin", because his last name Cubillán sounds like "Kubi yan" (クビやん) meaning "He is fired, isn't he?" in Japanese Kansai dialect, and "Darwin" has the same spelling as the last name of an English naturalist, Charles Darwin. In 2008, he signed with the SK Wyverns in South Korea, but was released during the season.

Cubillán also pitched winter ball for the Tigres de Aragua and Leones del Caracas clubs of the Venezuelan Professional Baseball League.

== See also ==
- List of Major League Baseball players from Venezuela
