= 1999 Oakland Athletics season =

1999 Oakland Athletics
- League: American League
- Division: West
- Ballpark: Network Associates Coliseum
- City: Oakland, California
- Record: 87–75 (.537)
- Divisional place: 2nd
- Owners: Stephen Schott & Kenneth Hofmann
- General managers: Billy Beane
- Managers: Art Howe
- Television: KICU-TV; Fox Sports Bay Area (Ray Fosse, Greg Papa, Ken Wilson)
- Radio: KABL (Bill King, Ken Korach, Ray Fosse)

The 1999 Oakland Athletics season was the 99th season for the Oakland Athletics franchise, all as members of the American League, and their 32nd season in Oakland. The Athletics finished second in the American League West with a record of 87 wins and 75 losses. In doing so, the Athletics finished with their first winning record since 1992. The campaign was also the first of eight consecutive winning seasons for the Athletics (the last of these coming in 2006).

== Offseason ==
- December 14, 1998: Tony Phillips was signed as a free agent by the Athletics.
- December 14, 1998: Rafael Bournigal was released by the Oakland Athletics.
- January 7, 1999: Marc Newfield was signed as a free agent by the Athletics.
- January 8, 1999: Mike Oquist was signed as a free agent with the Oakland Athletics.
- January 26, 1999: Tim Raines was signed as a free agent by the Athletics.
- February 17, 1999: John Jaha signed as a free agent by the Athletics.

== Regular season ==
=== Season standings ===
AL West
Team	W	L	Pct.	GB	Home	Road
Texas Rangers	95	67	.586	—	51‍–‍30	44‍–‍37
Oakland Athletics	87	75	.537	8	52‍–‍29	35‍–‍46
Seattle Mariners	79	83	.488	16	43‍–‍38	36‍–‍45
Anaheim Angels	70	92	.432	25	37‍–‍44	33‍–‍48

=== Record vs. opponents ===
1999 American League record Source: MLB Standings Grid – 1999
Team	ANA	BAL	BOS	CWS	CLE	DET	KC	MIN	NYY	OAK	SEA	TB	TEX	TOR	NL
Anaheim	—	3–9	1–9	5–5	1–9	5–5	7–5	6–4	6–4	8–4	6–6	7–5	6–6	3–9	6–12
Baltimore	9–3	—	5–7	7–3	1–9	5–5	6–4	8–1	4–9	5–7	5–5	5–7	6–6	1–11	11–7
Boston	9–1	7–5	—	7–5	8–4	7–5	8–2	6–4	8–4	4–6	7–3	4–9	4–5	9–3	6–12
Chicago	5–5	3–7	5–7	—	3–9	7–5	6–6	8–3–1	5–7	3–7	4–8	6–4	5–5	6–4	9–9
Cleveland	9–1	9–1	4–8	9–3	—	8–5	7–5	9–3	3–7	10–2	7–3	5–4	3–7	5–7	9–9
Detroit	5–5	5–5	5–7	5–7	5–8	—	7–4	6–6	5–7	4–6	3–7	4–5	5–5	2–10	8–10
Kansas City	5–7	4–6	2–8	6–6	5–7	4–7	—	5–8	5–4	6–6	7–5	2–8	4–6	3–7	6–12
Minnesota	4–6	1–8	4–6	3–8–1	3–9	6–6	8–5	—	4–6	7–5	4–8	5–5	0–12	4–6	10–7
New York	4–6	9–4	4–8	7–5	7–3	7–5	4–5	6–4	—	6–4	9–1	8–4	8–4	10–2	9–9
Oakland	4–8	7–5	6–4	7–3	2–10	6–4	6–6	5–7	4–6	—	6–6	9–1	5–7	8–2	12–6
Seattle	6–6	5–5	3–7	8–4	3–7	7–3	5–7	8–4	1–9	6–6	—	8–4	5–8	7–2	7–11
Tampa Bay	5–7	7–5	9–4	4–6	4–5	5–4	8–2	5–5	4–8	1–9	4–8	—	4–8	5–8	4–14
Texas	6–6	6–6	5–4	5–5	7–3	5–5	6–4	12–0	4–8	7–5	8–5	8–4	—	6–4	10–8
Toronto	9–3	11–1	3–9	4–6	7–5	10–2	7–3	6–4	2–10	2–8	2–7	8–5	4–6	—	9–9

=== Notable transactions ===
- July 23, 1999: Kenny Rogers was traded by the Athletics to the New York Mets for Terrence Long and Leo Vasquez.
- July 29, 1999: Jeff Davanon, Nathan Haynes, and Elvin Nina (minors) were traded by the Athletics to the Anaheim Angels for Randy Velarde and Omar Olivares.
- July 31, 1999: Billy Taylor was traded by the Athletics to the New York Mets for Jason Isringhausen and Greg McMichael.
- July 31, 1999: Jeff D'Amico, Brad Rigby and Blake Stein were traded by the Athletics to the Kansas City Royals for Kevin Appier.
- August 18, 1999: Rich Becker was traded by the Milwaukee Brewers to the Oakland Athletics for a player to be named later. The Oakland Athletics sent Carl Dale (August 20, 1999) to the Milwaukee Brewers to complete the trade.

=== Roster ===
1999 Oakland Athletics
Roster
Pitchers: 19 Kevin Appier; 49 Tom Candiotti; 29 Buddy Groom; 56 Chad Harville; 51 Jimmy Haynes; 31 Gil Heredia; 52 Tim Hudson; 48 Jason Isringhausen; 20 Kevin Jarvis; 24 Doug Jones; 58 Tim Kubinski; 58 Brett Laxton; 17 Ron Mahay; 33 T.J. Mathews; 49 Greg McMichael; 40 Omar Olivares; 44 Mike Oquist; 57 Brad Rigby; 37 Kenny Rogers; 59 Blake Stein; 22 Billy Taylor; 61 Luis Vizcaíno; 36 Tim Worrell	Catchers: 55 Ramón Hernández; 23 A. J. Hinch; 15 Mike Macfarlane; Infielders: 3 Eric Chavez; 16 Jason Giambi; 5 John Jaha; 7 Frank Menechino; 6 Tony Phillips; 9 Olmedo Sáenz; 21 Scott Spiezio; 4 Miguel Tejada; 13 Jorge Velandia; 8 Randy Velarde	Outfielders: 22 Rich Becker; 28 Ryan Christenson; 14 Ben Grieve; 2 Jason McDonald; 30 Tim Raines; 12 Matt Stairs	Manager: 18 Art Howe; Coaches: 41 Thad Bosley (First Base); 35 Brad Fischer (Bullpen); 45 Dave Hudgens (Hitting); 39 Ken Macha (Bench); 47 Rick Peterson (Pitching); 38 Ron Washington (Third Base)

== Player stats ==
= Indicates team leader

=== Batting ===
==== Starters by position ====
Note: Pos = Position; G = Games played; AB = At bats; H = Hits; Avg. = Batting average; HR = Home runs; RBI = Runs batted in

Pos	Player	G	AB	H	Avg.	HR	RBI
C	A. J. Hinch	76	205	44	.215	7	24
1B	Jason Giambi	158	575	181	.315	33	123
2B	Randy Velarde	61	255	85	.333	7	28
SS	Miguel Tejada	159	593	149	.251	21	84
3B	Eric Chavez	115	356	88	.247	13	50
LF	Ben Grieve	148	486	129	.265	28	86
CF	Ryan Christenson	106	268	56	.209	4	24
RF	Matt Stairs	146	531	137	.258	38	102
DH	John Jaha	142	457	126	.276	35	111

==== Other batters ====
Note: G = Games played; AB = At bats; H = Hits; Avg. = Batting average; HR = Home runs; RBI = Runs batted in

Player	G	AB	H	Avg.	HR	RBI
Tony Phillips	106	406	99	.244	15	49
Olmedo Sáenz	97	255	70	.275	11	41
Scott Spiezio	89	247	60	.243	8	33
Mike Macfarlane	81	226	55	.243	4	31
Jason McDonald	100	187	37	.209	3	8
Ramón Hernández	40	136	38	.279	3	21
Tim Raines	58	135	29	.215	4	17
Rich Becker	40	125	33	.264	1	10
Jorge Velandia	63	48	9	.188	0	2
Frank Menechino	9	9	2	.222	0	0

=== Pitching ===
==== Starting pitchers ====
Note: G = Games pitched; IP = Innings pitched; W = Wins; L = Losses; ERA = Earned run average; SO = Strikeouts

Player	G	IP	W	L	ERA	SO
Gil Heredia	33	200.1	13	8	4.81	117
Jimmy Haynes	30	142.0	7	12	6.34	93
Mike Oquist	28	140.2	9	10	5.37	89
Tim Hudson	21	136.1	11	2	3.23	132
Kenny Rogers	19	119.1	5	3	4.30	68
Omar Olivares	12	74.2	7	2	4.34	36
Kevin Appier	12	68.2	7	5	5.77	53
Tom Candiotti	11	56.2	3	5	6.35	30
Blake Stein	1	2.2	0	0	16.88	4

==== Other pitchers ====
Note: G = Games pitched; IP = Innings pitched; W = Wins; L = Losses; ERA = Earned run average; SO = Strikeouts

Player	G	IP	W	L	ERA	SO
Ron Mahay	6	19.1	2	0	1.86	15
Kevin Jarvis	4	14.0	0	1	11.57	11
Brett Laxton	3	9.2	0	1	7.45	9

==== Relief pitchers ====
Note: G = Games pitched; W = Wins; L = Losses; SV = Saves; ERA = Earned run average; SO = Strikeouts

Player	G	W	L	SV	ERA	SO
Billy Taylor	43	1	5	26	3.98	38
Buddy Groom	76	3	2	0	5.09	32
Doug Jones	70	5	5	10	3.55	63
Tim Worrell	53	2	2	0	4.15	62
T.J. Mathews	50	9	5	3	3.81	42
Brad Rigby	29	3	4	0	4.33	26
Jason Isringhausen	20	0	1	8	2.13	20
Greg McMichael	17	0	0	0	5.40	3
Chad Harville	15	0	2	0	6.91	15
Tim Kubinski	14	0	0	0	5.84	7
Luis Vizcaíno	1	0	0	0	5.40	2

== Awards and honors ==
All-Star Game

- John Jaha, Designated Hitter, Reserve

== Farm system ==
Level	Team	League	Manager
AAA	Vancouver Canadians	Pacific Coast League	Mike Quade
AA	Midland RockHounds	Texas League	Tony DeFrancesco
A	Modesto A's	California League	Bob Geren
A	Visalia Oaks	California League	Juan Navarrette
A-Short Season	Southern Oregon Timberjacks	Northwest League	Greg Sparks
Rookie	AZL Athletics	Arizona League	John Kuehl

LEAGUE CHAMPIONS: Vancouver, AZL Athletics
