= 1999 Kansas City Royals season =

1999 Kansas City Royals
- League: American League
- Division: Central
- Ballpark: Kauffman Stadium
- City: Kansas City, Missouri
- Record: 64–97 (.398)
- Divisional place: 5th
- Owners: David Glass
- General managers: Herk Robinson
- Managers: Tony Muser
- Television: KMBC-TV; KCWE; Fox Sports Rocky Mountain (Paul Splittorff, Bob Davis)
- Radio: KMBZ (Denny Matthews, Ryan Lefebvre)

The 1999 Kansas City Royals season was the 31st season for the franchise, and their 27th at Kauffman Stadium. The Royals finished fourth in the American League Central with a record of 64 wins and 97 losses and missed the postseason for the 14th consecutive season.

== Offseason ==
- October 30, 1998: Rico Rossy was signed as a free agent by the Royals.

== Regular season ==
- Mark Quinn hit two home runs in his major league debut.

=== Season standings ===
AL Central
Team	W	L	Pct.	GB	Home	Road
Cleveland Indians	97	65	.599	—	47‍–‍34	50‍–‍31
Chicago White Sox	75	86	.466	21½	38‍–‍42	37‍–‍44
Detroit Tigers	69	92	.429	27½	38‍–‍43	31‍–‍49
Kansas City Royals	64	97	.398	32½	33‍–‍47	31‍–‍50
Minnesota Twins	63	97	.394	33	31‍–‍50	32‍–‍47

=== Record vs. opponents ===
1999 American League record Source: MLB Standings Grid – 1999
Team	ANA	BAL	BOS	CWS	CLE	DET	KC	MIN	NYY	OAK	SEA	TB	TEX	TOR	NL
Anaheim	—	3–9	1–9	5–5	1–9	5–5	7–5	6–4	6–4	8–4	6–6	7–5	6–6	3–9	6–12
Baltimore	9–3	—	5–7	7–3	1–9	5–5	6–4	8–1	4–9	5–7	5–5	5–7	6–6	1–11	11–7
Boston	9–1	7–5	—	7–5	8–4	7–5	8–2	6–4	8–4	4–6	7–3	4–9	4–5	9–3	6–12
Chicago	5–5	3–7	5–7	—	3–9	7–5	6–6	8–3–1	5–7	3–7	4–8	6–4	5–5	6–4	9–9
Cleveland	9–1	9–1	4–8	9–3	—	8–5	7–5	9–3	3–7	10–2	7–3	5–4	3–7	5–7	9–9
Detroit	5–5	5–5	5–7	5–7	5–8	—	7–4	6–6	5–7	4–6	3–7	4–5	5–5	2–10	8–10
Kansas City	5–7	4–6	2–8	6–6	5–7	4–7	—	5–8	5–4	6–6	7–5	2–8	4–6	3–7	6–12
Minnesota	4–6	1–8	4–6	3–8–1	3–9	6–6	8–5	—	4–6	7–5	4–8	5–5	0–12	4–6	10–7
New York	4–6	9–4	4–8	7–5	7–3	7–5	4–5	6–4	—	6–4	9–1	8–4	8–4	10–2	9–9
Oakland	4–8	7–5	6–4	7–3	2–10	6–4	6–6	5–7	4–6	—	6–6	9–1	5–7	8–2	12–6
Seattle	6–6	5–5	3–7	8–4	3–7	7–3	5–7	8–4	1–9	6–6	—	8–4	5–8	7–2	7–11
Tampa Bay	5–7	7–5	9–4	4–6	4–5	5–4	8–2	5–5	4–8	1–9	4–8	—	4–8	5–8	4–14
Texas	6–6	6–6	5–4	5–5	7–3	5–5	6–4	12–0	4–8	7–5	8–5	8–4	—	6–4	10–8
Toronto	9–3	11–1	3–9	4–6	7–5	10–2	7–3	6–4	2–10	2–8	2–7	8–5	4–6	—	9–9

=== Notable transactions ===
- July 31, 1999: Kevin Appier was traded by the Royals to the Oakland Athletics for Jeff D'Amico, Brad Rigby and Blake Stein.

=== Roster ===
1999 Kansas City Royals
Roster
Pitchers: 17 Kevin Appier; 44 Brian Barber; 58 Tim Byrdak; 53 Lance Carter; 33 Chad Durbin; 41,49 Chris Fussell; 39 Terry Mathews; 21 Jeff Montgomery; 45 Orber Moreno; 51 Alvin Morman; 57 Dan Murray; 34 Marc Pisciotta; 34 Jim Pittsley; 57 Ken Ray; 54 Dan Reichert; 30 Brad Rigby; 50 José Rosado; 53 Glendon Rusch; 46 José Santiago; 48 Scott Service; 41 Blake Stein; 37 Jeff Suppan; 55 Mac Suzuki; 34 Derek Wallace; 41 Don Wengert; 56 Matt Whisenant; 47 Jay Witasick	Catchers: 13 Sal Fasano; 19 Chad Kreuter; 12 Tim Spehr; Infielders: 3 Carlos Febles; 15 Jeremy Giambi; 2 Jed Hansen; 4 Ray Holbert; 7 Jeff King; 8 Scott Leius; 32 Mendy López; 26 Félix Martínez; 16 Joe Randa; 1 Rey Sánchez; 6 Steve Scarsone; 22 Larry Sutton; 29 Mike Sweeney; 31 Joe Vitiello	Outfielders: 36 Carlos Beltrán; 27 Dee Brown; 18 Johnny Damon; 24 Jermaine Dye; 38 Scott Pose; 52 Mark Quinn	Manager: 40 Tony Muser; Coaches: 43 Tom Burgmeier (bullpen); 25 Rich Dauer (third base); 23 Lamar Johnson (hitting); 9 Jamie Quirk (bench); 20 Frank White (first base); 28 Mark Wiley (pitching)

== Player stats ==
=== Batting ===
==== Starters by position ====
Note: Pos = Position; G = Games played; AB = At bats; H = Hits; Avg. = Batting average; HR = Home runs; RBI = Runs batted in

Pos	Player	G	AB	H	Avg.	HR	RBI
C	Chad Kreuter	107	324	73	.225	5	35
1B	Jeremy Giambi	90	288	82	.285	3	34
2B	Carlos Febles	123	453	116	.256	10	53
SS	Rey Sánchez	134	479	141	.294	2	56
3B	Joe Randa	156	628	197	.314	16	84
LF	Johnny Damon	145	583	179	.307	14	77
CF	Carlos Beltrán	156	663	194	.293	22	108
RF	Jermaine Dye	158	608	179	.294	27	119
DH	Mike Sweeney	150	575	185	.322	22	102

==== Other batters ====
Note: G = Games played; AB = At bats; H = Hits; Avg. = Batting average; HR = Home runs; RBI = Runs batted in

Player	G	AB	H	Avg.	HR	RBI
Tim Spehr	60	155	32	.206	9	26
Scott Pose	86	137	39	.285	0	12
Larry Sutton	43	102	23	.225	2	15
Ray Holbert	34	100	28	.280	0	5
Jed Hansen	49	79	16	.203	3	5
Scott Leius	37	74	15	.203	1	10
Jeff King	21	72	17	.236	3	11
Steve Scarsone	46	68	14	.206	0	6
Sal Fasano	23	60	14	.233	5	16
Mark Quinn	17	60	20	.333	6	18
Joe Vitiello	13	41	6	.146	1	4
Dee Brown	12	25	2	.080	0	0
Mendy López	7	20	8	.400	0	3
Félix Martínez	6	7	1	.143	0	0

=== Pitching ===
==== Starting pitchers ====
Note: G = Games pitched; IP = Innings pitched; W = Wins; L = Losses; ERA = Earned run average; SO = Strikeouts

Player	G	IP	W	L	ERA	SO
Jeff Suppan	32	208.2	10	12	4.53	103
José Rosado	33	208.0	10	14	3.85	141
Jay Witasick	32	158.1	9	12	5.57	102
Kevin Appier	22	140.1	9	9	4.87	78
Blake Stein	12	70.1	1	2	4.09	43
Dan Reichert	8	36.2	2	2	9.08	20
Jim Pittsley	5	23.1	1	2	6.94	7

==== Other pitchers ====
Note: G = Games pitched; IP = Innings pitched; W = Wins; L = Losses; ERA = Earned run average; SO = Strikeouts

Player	G	IP	W	L	ERA	SO
Mac Suzuki	22	68.0	2	3	5.16	36
Chris Fussell	17	56.0	0	5	7.39	37
Brian Barber	8	18.2	1	3	9.64	7

==== Relief pitchers ====
Note: G = Games pitched; W = Wins; L = Losses; SV = Saves; ERA = Earned run average; SO = Strikeouts

Player	G	W	L	SV	ERA	SO
Jeff Montgomery	49	1	4	12	6.84	27
Scott Service	68	5	5	8	6.09	68
Alvin Morman	49	2	4	1	4.05	31
Matt Whisenant	48	4	4	1	6.35	27
José Santiago	34	3	4	2	3.42	15
Tim Byrdak	33	0	3	1	7.60	17
Terry Mathews	24	2	1	1	4.38	19
Brad Rigby	20	1	2	0	7.17	10
Ken Ray	13	1	0	0	8.74	0
Don Wengert	11	0	1	0	9.25	10
Derek Wallace	8	0	1	0	3.24	5
Marc Pisciotta	8	0	2	0	8.64	3
Orber Moreno	7	0	0	0	5.63	7
Lance Carter	6	0	1	0	5.06	3
Dan Murray	4	0	0	0	6.48	8
Glendon Rusch	3	0	1	0	15.75	4
Chad Durbin	1	0	0	0	0.00	3

== Farm system ==
Level	Team	League	Manager
AAA	Omaha Golden Spikes	Pacific Coast League	Ron Johnson
AA	Wichita Wranglers	Texas League	John Mizerock
A	Wilmington Blue Rocks	Carolina League	Jeff Garber
A	Charleston Alley Cats	South Atlantic League	Tom Poquette
A-Short Season	Spokane Indians	Northwest League	Kevin Long
Rookie	GCL Royals	Gulf Coast League	Andre David

LEAGUE CHAMPIONS: Wichita, Spokane; LEAGUE CO-CHAMPIONS: Wilmington
