= 1999 Minnesota Twins season =

1999 Minnesota Twins
- League: American League
- Division: Central
- Ballpark: Hubert H. Humphrey Metrodome
- City: Minneapolis
- Record: 63–97 (.394)
- Divisional place: 5th
- Owners: Carl Pohlad
- General managers: Terry Ryan
- Managers: Tom Kelly
- Television: KMSP-TV; Midwest Sports Channel (Bert Blyleven, Dick Bremer, Paul Molitor)
- Radio: 830 WCCO AM (Herb Carneal, John Gordon)

The 1999 Minnesota Twins season was the 39th season for the franchise in the Twin Cities of Minnesota, their eighteen season at Hubert H. Humphrey Metrodome and the 99th overall in the American League. They began their season on a positive note, with Brad Radke getting the win in a 6–1 victory over the Toronto Blue Jays. However, they finished the season in last place, with a 63–97 record.

== Offseason ==
- October 2, 1998: Todd Ritchie was released by the Twins.
- December 14, 1998: Alex Ochoa was traded by the Twins to the Milwaukee Brewers for a player to be named later. The Brewers completed the deal by sending Darrell Nicholas (minors) to the Twins on December 15.
- December 15, 1998: Melvin Nieves was signed as a free agent by the Twins.
- December 21, 1998: George Williams was signed as a free agent by the Twins.
- January 27, 1999: Bob Wells was signed as a free agent by the Twins.
- February 16, 1999: Bobby Kielty was signed as an amateur free agent by the Twins.
- March 20, 1999: Melvin Nieves was purchased from the Twins by the Fukuoka Daiei Hawks.
- March 31, 1999: Dan Serafini was purchased from the Twins by the Chicago Cubs.

== Regular season ==
Seventeen rookies saw playing time for manager Tom Kelly in the 1999 season. Some of these rookies, such as Corey Koskie, Torii Hunter, and Joe Mays, would go on to future success. The season was not without its bright spots, including Doug Mientkiewicz's .997 fielding percentage and Koskie's team-leading .310 batting average. Another bright spot occurred on September 11, when pitcher Eric Milton threw the only no-hitter of his career against an Anaheim Angels team that consisted mainly of September call-ups. However, the euphemism "rebuilding year" must be applied to the Twins' 1999 campaign.

On May 4, rookie Mike Lincoln pitched the Twins to their 3,000th victory. It was Lincoln's first win in the major leagues, as he beat the Yankees 8–5 at the Metrodome. Bert Blyleven was on the mound for both the Twins' 1,000th and 2,000th victories.

- Win 1: Pedro Ramos, 1961.
- Win 500: Jim Kaat, 1966.
- Win 1000: Blyleven, 1973.
- Win 1500: Roger Erickson, 1978.
- Win 2000: Blyleven, 1986
- Win 2500: Jack Morris, 1991

It was only May 21 when the team's brain trust realized that this would not be a world champion team. On that day, the Twins traded Rick Aguilera, then their highest paid player, to the Chicago Cubs. The team also traded Scott Downs and received Jason Ryan and future starter Kyle Lohse in return. The team finished the season with a 63–97 record, ranked fifth in the American League Central Division.

The lone representative of the Twins in the All-Star Game was Ron Coomer. He replaced Jim Thome at first base and went 0 for 1.

The highest paid Twin in 1999 was Rick Aguilera at $4,300,000; followed by Marty Cordova at $3,000,000.

=== Offense ===
The offense was not impressive. Minnesota was last in the league in slugging and had only one more walk than the league-worst White Sox. The team leaders were: Coomer with 16 home runs; Cordova with 70 RBI; Walker with a .279 average; Walker with 148 hits and 37 doubles; and Lawton with 26 stolen bases.

Several players failed to meet expectations offensively. In June, Lawton was hit in the face by a pitch. He missed a month and had trouble finding his swing after returning. Mientkiewicz had a great season batting-wise at the double-A level in 1998, but was not able to follow it up the following year at the major league level.

Team Leaders
Statistic	Player	Quantity
HR	Ron Coomer	16
RBI	Marty Cordova	70
BA	Todd Walker	.279
Runs	Chad Allen	69

=== Pitching ===
Radke, Milton, and LaTroy Hawkins filled the first three spots in the starting rotation throughout the season. The fourth and fifth spots were less predictable. Mays did emerge as a capable starter midway through the season, making 20 starts. Also making an appreciable number of starts in 1999 were Mike Lincoln (15), Dan Perkins (12), and Jason Ryan (8).

Aguilera started the season as the Twins' closer and recorded eight saves, but Mike Trombley took over the closer duties in May and finished the season with 24 saves. Trombley, Bob Wells, Travis Miller, Eddie Guardado, and Héctor Carrasco had respectable seasons out of the bullpen.

Overall, the pitching staff allowed the second fewest walks in the American League and had an average ERA.

Team Leaders
Statistic	Player	Quantity
ERA	Brad Radke	3.75
Wins	Brad Radke	12
Saves	Mike Trombley	24
Strikeouts	Eric Milton	163

=== Defense ===
Like most of manager Tom Kelly's teams, this one was fundamentally sound. For example, the team committed the third fewest errors in the major leagues in spite of its inexperience.

Chad Allen, Hunter, and Matt Lawton saw consistent playing time in the outfield. However, Jacque Jones saw enough at bats to supplant Allen the following season, leading to the "Soul Patrol" of Jones, Hunter, and Lawton. Terry Steinbach was the starting catcher, with Javier Valentín as his backup. Three of the infield positions were fairly stable, with Mientkiewicz getting the bulk of the time at first base, Todd Walker at second, and Cristian Guzmán at short. Although Coomer was the opening day third baseman, Koskie ended up playing the most games at that position. (Coomer saw time at first when it became apparent that Mientkiewicz was not yet ready to face major-league pitchers.) Brent Gates also saw substantial playing time at third, as well as second. Marty Cordova played in 88 games as the designated hitter.

=== Season standings ===
AL Central
Team	W	L	Pct.	GB	Home	Road
Cleveland Indians	97	65	.599	—	47‍–‍34	50‍–‍31
Chicago White Sox	75	86	.466	21½	38‍–‍42	37‍–‍44
Detroit Tigers	69	92	.429	27½	38‍–‍43	31‍–‍49
Kansas City Royals	64	97	.398	32½	33‍–‍47	31‍–‍50
Minnesota Twins	63	97	.394	33	31‍–‍50	32‍–‍47

=== Record vs. opponents ===
1999 American League record Source: MLB Standings Grid – 1999
Team	ANA	BAL	BOS	CWS	CLE	DET	KC	MIN	NYY	OAK	SEA	TB	TEX	TOR	NL
Anaheim	—	3–9	1–9	5–5	1–9	5–5	7–5	6–4	6–4	8–4	6–6	7–5	6–6	3–9	6–12
Baltimore	9–3	—	5–7	7–3	1–9	5–5	6–4	8–1	4–9	5–7	5–5	5–7	6–6	1–11	11–7
Boston	9–1	7–5	—	7–5	8–4	7–5	8–2	6–4	8–4	4–6	7–3	4–9	4–5	9–3	6–12
Chicago	5–5	3–7	5–7	—	3–9	7–5	6–6	8–3–1	5–7	3–7	4–8	6–4	5–5	6–4	9–9
Cleveland	9–1	9–1	4–8	9–3	—	8–5	7–5	9–3	3–7	10–2	7–3	5–4	3–7	5–7	9–9
Detroit	5–5	5–5	5–7	5–7	5–8	—	7–4	6–6	5–7	4–6	3–7	4–5	5–5	2–10	8–10
Kansas City	5–7	4–6	2–8	6–6	5–7	4–7	—	5–8	5–4	6–6	7–5	2–8	4–6	3–7	6–12
Minnesota	4–6	1–8	4–6	3–8–1	3–9	6–6	8–5	—	4–6	7–5	4–8	5–5	0–12	4–6	10–7
New York	4–6	9–4	4–8	7–5	7–3	7–5	4–5	6–4	—	6–4	9–1	8–4	8–4	10–2	9–9
Oakland	4–8	7–5	6–4	7–3	2–10	6–4	6–6	5–7	4–6	—	6–6	9–1	5–7	8–2	12–6
Seattle	6–6	5–5	3–7	8–4	3–7	7–3	5–7	8–4	1–9	6–6	—	8–4	5–8	7–2	7–11
Tampa Bay	5–7	7–5	9–4	4–6	4–5	5–4	8–2	5–5	4–8	1–9	4–8	—	4–8	5–8	4–14
Texas	6–6	6–6	5–4	5–5	7–3	5–5	6–4	12–0	4–8	7–5	8–5	8–4	—	6–4	10–8
Toronto	9–3	11–1	3–9	4–6	7–5	10–2	7–3	6–4	2–10	2–8	2–7	8–5	4–6	—	9–9

=== Roster ===
1999 Minnesota Twins
Roster
Pitchers: 38 Rick Aguilera; 58 Héctor Carrasco; 18 Eddie Guardado; 32 LaTroy Hawkins; 19 Mike Lincoln; 53 Joe Mays; 20 Travis Miller; 41 Eric Milton; 49 Dan Perkins; 22 Brad Radke; 51 Rob Radlosky; 57 Gary Rath; 55 Mark Redman; 33 J. C. Romero; 54 Jason Ryan; 23 Benj Sampson; 21 Mike Trombley; 46 Bob Wells	Catchers: 9 A. J. Pierzynski; 36 Terry Steinbach; 26 Javier Valentín; Infielders: 8 Ron Coomer; 56 Cleatus Davidson; 5 Brent Gates; 15 Cristian Guzmán; 7 Denny Hocking; 47 Corey Koskie; 25 Doug Mientkiewicz; 27 David Ortiz; 12 Todd Walker	Outfielders: 31 Chad Allen; 40 Marty Cordova; 16 Midre Cummings; 48 Torii Hunter; 11 Jacque Jones; 28 Chris Latham; 50 Matt Lawton	Manager: 10 Tom Kelly; Coaches: 35 Ron Gardenhire (third base); 43 Rick Stelmaszek (bullpen); 44 Dick Such (pitching); 45 Scott Ullger; 13 Jerry White

=== Notable transactions ===
- April 22: Jack Cressend was selected off waivers by the Twins from the Boston Red Sox.
- May 14: Midre Cummings was signed as a free agent by the Twins.
- May 21: Rick Aguilera and Scott Downs were traded by the Twins to the Chicago Cubs for Kyle Lohse and Jason Ryan.
- May 26: Frank Rodriguez was selected off waivers from the Twins by the Seattle Mariners.
- June 2: 1999 Major League Baseball draft
  - Rob Bowen was drafted by the Twins in the 2nd round.
  - Justin Morneau was drafted by the Twins in the 3rd round.
  - Terry Tiffee was drafted by the Twins in the 26th round.
- August 3, 1999: George Williams was traded by the Twins to the Houston Astros for Josh Dimmick (minors).

== Player stats ==
=== Batting ===
==== Starters by position ====
Note: Pos = Position; G = Games played; AB = At bats; H = Hits; Avg. = Batting average; HR = Home runs; RBI = Runs batted in

Pos	Player	G	AB	H	Avg.	HR	RBI
C	Terry Steinbach	101	338	96	.284	4	42
1B	Doug Mientkiewicz	118	327	75	.229	2	32
2B	Todd Walker	143	531	148	.279	6	46
SS	Cristian Guzmán	131	420	95	.226	1	26
3B	Corey Koskie	117	342	106	.310	11	58
LF	Chad Allen	137	481	133	.277	10	46
CF	Torii Hunter	135	384	98	.255	9	35
RF	Matt Lawton	118	406	105	.259	7	54
DH	Marty Cordova	124	425	121	.285	14	70

==== Other batters ====
Note: G = Games played; AB = At bats; H = Hits; Avg. = Batting average; HR = Home runs; RBI = Runs batted in

Player	G	AB	H	Avg.	HR	RBI
Ron Coomer	127	467	123	.263	16	65
Denny Hocking	136	386	103	.267	7	41
Jacque Jones	95	322	93	.289	9	44
Brent Gates	110	306	78	.255	3	38
Javier Valentín	78	218	54	.248	5	28
Midre Cummings	16	38	10	.263	1	9
Chris Latham	14	22	2	.091	0	3
Cleatus Davidson	12	22	3	.136	0	3
A. J. Pierzynski	9	22	6	.273	0	3
David Ortiz	10	20	0	.000	0	0

=== Pitching ===
==== Starting pitchers ====
Note: G = Games pitched; IP = Innings pitched; W = Wins; L = Losses; ERA = Earned run average; SO = Strikeouts

Player	G	IP	W	L	ERA	SO
Brad Radke	33	218.2	12	14	3.75	121
Eric Milton	34	206.1	7	11	4.49	163
LaTroy Hawkins	33	174.1	10	14	6.66	103
Mike Lincoln	18	76.1	3	10	6.84	27
Jason Ryan	8	40.2	1	4	4.87	15

==== Other pitchers ====
Note: G = Games pitched; IP = Innings pitched; W = Wins; L = Losses; ERA = Earned run average; SO = Strikeouts

Player	G	IP	W	L	ERA	SO
Joe Mays	49	171.0	6	11	4.37	115
Dan Perkins	29	86.2	1	7	6.54	44
Benj Sampson	30	71.0	3	2	8.11	56
Mark Redman	5	12.2	1	0	8.53	11
Gary Rath	5	4.2	0	1	11.57	1

==== Relief pitchers ====
Note: G = Games pitched; W = Wins; L = Losses; SV = Saves; ERA = Earned run average; SO = Strikeouts

Player	G	W	L	SV	ERA	SO
Mike Trombley	75	2	8	24	4.33	82
Bob Wells	76	8	3	1	3.81	44
Eddie Guardado	63	2	5	2	4.50	50
Travis Miller	52	2	2	0	2.72	40
Héctor Carrasco	39	2	3	1	4.96	35
Rick Aguilera	17	3	1	6	1.27	13
Rob Radlosky	7	0	1	0	12.46	3
J.C. Romero	5	0	0	0	3.72	4

== Other post-season awards ==
- Calvin R. Griffith Award (Most Valuable Twin) – Brad Radke
- Joseph W. Haynes Award (Twins Pitcher of the Year) – Brad Radke
- Bill Boni Award (Twins Outstanding Rookie) – Cristian Guzmán
- Charles O. Johnson Award (Most Improved Twin) – Eric Milton
- Dick Siebert Award (Upper Midwest Player of the Year) – Rick Helling
  - The above awards are voted on by the Twin Cities chapter of the BBWAA
- Carl R. Pohlad Award (Outstanding Community Service) – Ron Coomer
- Sherry Robertson Award (Twins Outstanding Farm System Player) – Michael Restovich

== Farm system ==
Level	Team	League	Manager
AAA	Salt Lake Buzz	Pacific Coast League	Phil Roof
AA	New Britain Rock Cats	Eastern League	John Russell
A	Fort Myers Miracle	Florida State League	Mike Boulanger
A	Quad Cities River Bandits	Midwest League	Jose Marzan
Rookie	Elizabethton Twins	Appalachian League	Jon Mathews
Rookie	GCL Twins	Gulf Coast League	Al Newman
