= 1999 Detroit Tigers season =

Major League Baseball season

1999 Detroit Tigers
- League: American League
- Division: Central
- Ballpark: Tiger Stadium
- City: Detroit, Michigan
- Record: 69–92 (.429)
- Divisional place: 3rd
- Owners: Mike Ilitch
- General managers: Randy Smith
- Managers: Larry Parrish
- Television: WKBD (Frank Beckmann, Al Kaline); FSN Detroit (Kirk Gibson, Josh Lewin)
- Radio: WJR (Ernie Harwell, Jim Price)

The 1999 Detroit Tigers season was the team's 99th season and—after nearly a century of baseball at the corner of Michigan and Trumbull—its 88th and final season at Tiger Stadium. The team had a record of 69–92 and finished in third place of the American League Central, 27 1/2 games behind the Cleveland Indians. On September 27, 1999, Robert Fick had the final hit of the final game at Tiger Stadium, a rooftop grand slam, which was the stadium's 11,111th home run. In the 2000 season, the Tigers moved to Comerica Park.

== Offseason ==
- October 6, 1998: Doug Bochtler was selected off waivers by the Los Angeles Dodgers from the Detroit Tigers.
- December 14, 1998: Bill Haselman was signed as a free agent with the Detroit Tigers.
- December 18, 1998: Luis Polonia was signed as a free agent with the Detroit Tigers.

== Regular season ==
=== Highlights ===
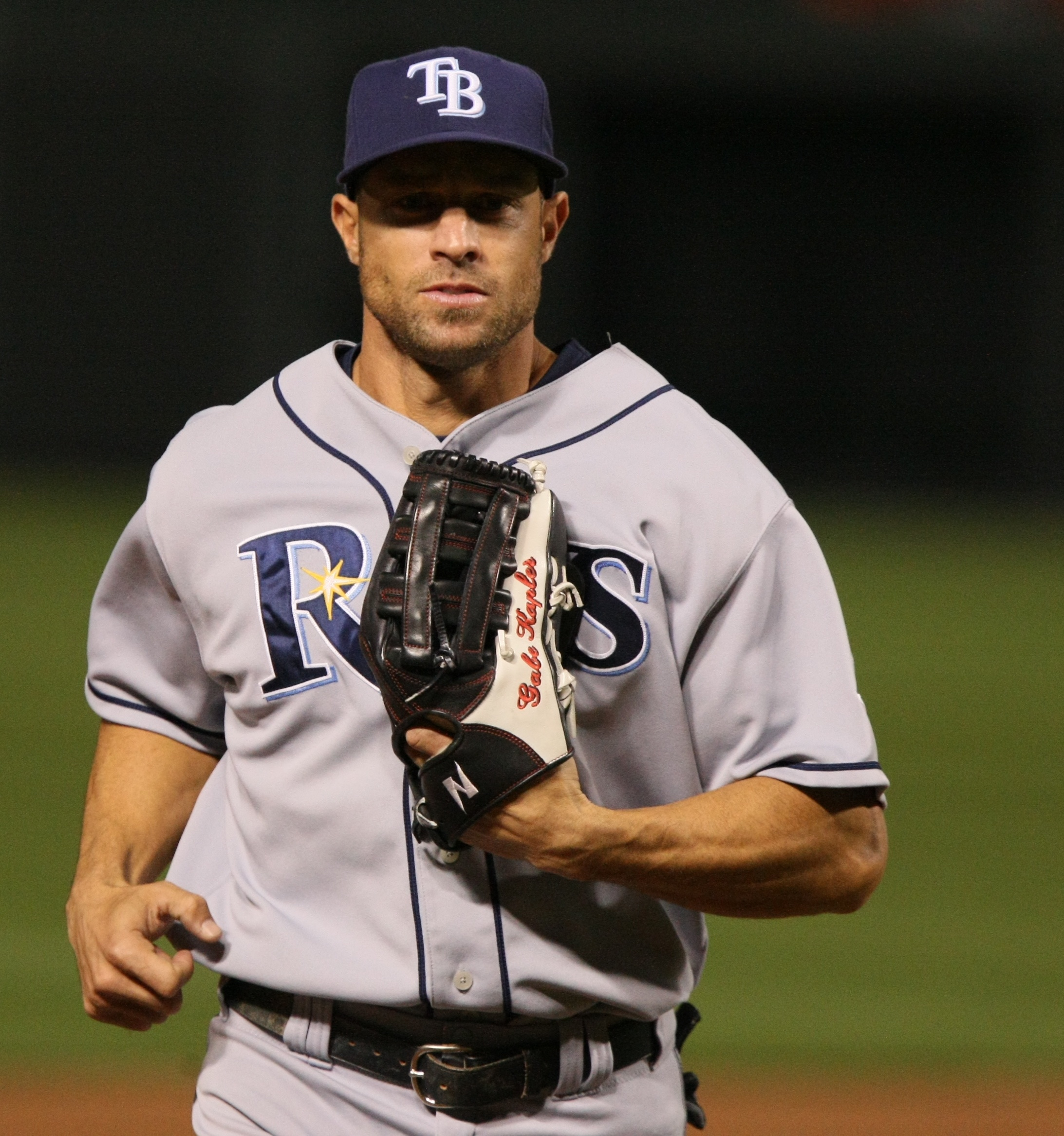
Gabe Kapler

- April 12: The Final Opening Day in Tiger Stadium history. Willie Blair and Eric Milton of the Minnesota Twins engaged in a scoreless battle through several innings. The Twins finally won the game in the twelfth inning by a score of 1–0.
- April 22: Todd Jones gets career save number 100.
- May 6: Gabe Kapler hits his first home run in Tiger Stadium.
- May 7–9: The Tigers played the Baltimore Orioles. Shortstop Cal Ripken Jr. does not appear in one game for the Orioles.
- May 15: Alice Cooper tosses out the ceremonial first pitch.
- May 16: Tony Clark hits career home run number 100.
- May 28: Karim García becomes the 34th player in the history of Major League Baseball to hit a home run over the Tiger Stadium roof in right field.
- June 4–6: The Tigers played the St. Louis Cardinals. First baseman Mark McGwire does not hit a home run in the series.

=== Season standings ===
AL Central
Team	W	L	Pct.	GB	Home	Road
Cleveland Indians	97	65	.599	—	47‍–‍34	50‍–‍31
Chicago White Sox	75	86	.466	21½	38‍–‍42	37‍–‍44
Detroit Tigers	69	92	.429	27½	38‍–‍43	31‍–‍49
Kansas City Royals	64	97	.398	32½	33‍–‍47	31‍–‍50
Minnesota Twins	63	97	.394	33	31‍–‍50	32‍–‍47

=== Record vs. opponents ===
1999 American League record Source: MLB Standings Grid – 1999
Team	ANA	BAL	BOS	CWS	CLE	DET	KC	MIN	NYY	OAK	SEA	TB	TEX	TOR	NL
Anaheim	—	3–9	1–9	5–5	1–9	5–5	7–5	6–4	6–4	8–4	6–6	7–5	6–6	3–9	6–12
Baltimore	9–3	—	5–7	7–3	1–9	5–5	6–4	8–1	4–9	5–7	5–5	5–7	6–6	1–11	11–7
Boston	9–1	7–5	—	7–5	8–4	7–5	8–2	6–4	8–4	4–6	7–3	4–9	4–5	9–3	6–12
Chicago	5–5	3–7	5–7	—	3–9	7–5	6–6	8–3–1	5–7	3–7	4–8	6–4	5–5	6–4	9–9
Cleveland	9–1	9–1	4–8	9–3	—	8–5	7–5	9–3	3–7	10–2	7–3	5–4	3–7	5–7	9–9
Detroit	5–5	5–5	5–7	5–7	5–8	—	7–4	6–6	5–7	4–6	3–7	4–5	5–5	2–10	8–10
Kansas City	5–7	4–6	2–8	6–6	5–7	4–7	—	5–8	5–4	6–6	7–5	2–8	4–6	3–7	6–12
Minnesota	4–6	1–8	4–6	3–8–1	3–9	6–6	8–5	—	4–6	7–5	4–8	5–5	0–12	4–6	10–7
New York	4–6	9–4	4–8	7–5	7–3	7–5	4–5	6–4	—	6–4	9–1	8–4	8–4	10–2	9–9
Oakland	4–8	7–5	6–4	7–3	2–10	6–4	6–6	5–7	4–6	—	6–6	9–1	5–7	8–2	12–6
Seattle	6–6	5–5	3–7	8–4	3–7	7–3	5–7	8–4	1–9	6–6	—	8–4	5–8	7–2	7–11
Tampa Bay	5–7	7–5	9–4	4–6	4–5	5–4	8–2	5–5	4–8	1–9	4–8	—	4–8	5–8	4–14
Texas	6–6	6–6	5–4	5–5	7–3	5–5	6–4	12–0	4–8	7–5	8–5	8–4	—	6–4	10–8
Toronto	9–3	11–1	3–9	4–6	7–5	10–2	7–3	6–4	2–10	2–8	2–7	8–5	4–6	—	9–9

=== Transactions ===
- April 16, 1999: Mel Rojas was traded by the Los Angeles Dodgers with Dave Mlicki to the Detroit Tigers for Robinson Checo, Aposto Garcia (minors), and Richard Roberts (minors).
- May 12, 1999: Mel Rojas was released by the Detroit Tigers.

=== Roster ===
1999 Detroit Tigers
Roster
Pitchers: 14 Matt Anderson; 20 Willie Blair; 45 Dave Borkowski; 26 Doug Brocail; 58 Will Brunson; 43 Francisco Cordero; 40 Nelson Cruz; 39 Bryce Florie; 52 Beiker Graterol; 35 Erik Hiljus; 59 Todd Jones; 41 Masao Kida; 40 Felipe Lira; 30 Dave Mlicki; 38 Brian Moehler; 49 C. J. Nitkowski; 53 Willis Roberts; 51 Mel Rojas; 44 Sean Runyan; 22 Justin Thompson; 36 Jeff Weaver	Catchers: 12 Brad Ausmus; 37 Bill Haselman; 39 Robert Fick; Infielders: 27 Frank Catalanotto; 17 Tony Clark; 8 Deivi Cruz; 9 Damion Easley; 46 Luis García; 25,21 Gregg Jefferies; 48 José Macías; 7 Dean Palmer; 32 Jason Wood	Outfielders: 25 Gabe Alvarez; 18 Kimera Bartee; 34 Juan Encarnación; 24 Karim García; 4 Bobby Higginson; 21 Brian Hunter; 23 Gabe Kapler; 29 Luis Polonia	Manager: 15 Larry Parrish; Coaches: 35 Rick Adair (pitching); 19 Perry Hill (third base); 54 Jeff Jones (bullpen); 13 Lance Parrish (bench); 3 Alan Trammell (hitting); 10 Juan Samuel (first base)

== Final game at Tiger Stadium ==
The final game at Tiger Stadium was played on September 27, 1999, between the Detroit Tigers and the Kansas City Royals. The Tigers were victorious 8–2. The winning pitcher was Detroit starter Brian Moehler. The losing pitcher was Jeff Suppan.

=== The pregame ceremony ===
Prior to the final game at Tiger Stadium, a ceremony was held. It was emceed by then current Tiger broadcaster and Ford C. Frick Award recipient Ernie Harwell. The National Anthem was performed by The Mosaic Youth Theatre of Detroit Singers. At the ceremony, owner Mike Ilitch spoke along with then Michigan governor John Engler, then Detroit mayor Dennis Archer and Commissioner of Baseball Bud Selig. Also featured at the ceremony was longtime Tiger right fielder and Hall of Famer Al Kaline.

Notably, several of the players in the game would pay tribute to former Tigers players with their uniforms; in addition to all of the uniforms being deliberately left without the names of the players, several players would wear the numbers of former Tiger legends for the game, with the selections being predetermined with a fan survey beforehand. Right fielder Karim Garcia donned Al Kaline's number 6 and first baseman Tony Clark wore Hank Greenberg's number 5; while center fielder Gabe Kapler went a step further and wore a uniform also without a number in a tribute to Ty Cobb, who played during an era when numbers were not used.

Instead of both managers exchanging lineups before the game, both clubs appointed honorary captains. Representing the Tigers was Kaline and representing the Royals was former MVP and Hall of Fame third baseman George Brett.

Well, here's Robert Fick. Another man who's counted on in the future, wearing Norm Cash's number 25..remember, Al told him he'd hit a home run today. AND HE DID! There she goes! And it is...on the roof! Robert Fick, a grand slam that hits the roof and comes back! Kaline called it! How do you like that? Look at these flashbulbs! What a moment! – Frank Beckmann on WKBD television, calling Fick's eighth inning grand slam off Jeff Montgomery, the final home run hit at Tiger Stadium.

Tigers lead it 8–2. Two down in the ninth inning. Jones is ready. He delivers. Here's a swing and a miss. The game is over, and Tiger Stadium is no more. – Ernie Harwell, calling Carlos Beltrán's strikeout to end the game on WJR radio.

=== The postgame ceremony ===
The game ended at 7:07 pm. The grounds crew then surrounded home plate. Groundskeeper Charlie McGee, using a pick axe, dug up home plate at 7:13. It would then be transported by Tiger pitchers Matt Anderson, Jeff Weaver, and Francisco Cordero, with police escort, to Comerica Park.

Ernie Harwell then read a history of Tiger Stadium accompanied by music from the movie Field of Dreams. He introduced a film containing images of such Tiger legends as Ty Cobb, Sam Crawford, Hughie Jennings and Harry Heilmann. In addition, the Tigers Hall of Famers were honored: Heinie Manush, Mickey Cochrane, Charlie Gehringer, Hank Greenberg, Hal Newhouser, George Kell, and Harwell.

Following remarks from Willie Horton and former manager Sparky Anderson, there emerged from the center field gate players from times past, including Mark Fidrych, Bill Freehan, Dick McAuliffe, Dave Bergman, Mickey Stanley, Willie Horton, Kirk Gibson, Cecil Fielder, Al Kaline, the combination of Alan Trammell and Lou Whitaker, and Elden Auker. A line was formed from the center field flagpole to home plate, along which was passed the flag that had flown from the pole in dead center over the finale.

After Auker passed the flag to catcher Brad Ausmus, players threw souvenirs into the stands as some reached over and put dirt from the warning track into plastic bags. It was at this time that Harwell gave his final goodbye: "Tonight, we say good-bye. ... Farewell, old friend Tiger Stadium. We will remember."

At 8:19, the scoreboard was shut off. At quarter to nine, a final team picture was taken, and by 9 the stands were empty. As the last of the fans left, a sign was hung on the famous right-center field overhang which read: "Today, there is crying in baseball. So long, old friend."

=== Ernie Harwell's farewell ===
"Ladies and gentlemen, less than six months ago, we began a warm season of farewells, and with each passing day we came a little bit closer to this historic occasion.

"The Lions, Joe Louis and Nelson Mandela. 6,873 regular-season games, 35 postseason contests and a trio of spectacular All-Star Games, Tiger Stadium has been home to this great game of baseball. But more than anything, it has been a cherished home to our memories.

"Will you remember that last base hit? The last out? How about that last pitch? Or maybe it's the first time as a child when you saw that green, green grass that will forever be etched into your mind and soul.

"Tonight, we say good-bye. But we will not forget. Open your eyes, look around and take a mental picture. Moments like this shall live on forever.

"It's been 88 moving years at Michigan and Trumbull. The tradition built here shall endure along with the permanence of the Olde English D. But tonight we must say good-bye.

"Farewell, old friend Tiger Stadium. We will remember."

== Player stats ==
= Indicates team leader

=== Batting ===
Note: G = Games played; AB = At bats; H = Hits; Avg. = Batting average; HR = Home runs; RBI = Runs batted in

Player	G	AB	H	Avg.	HR	RBI
Dean Palmer	150	560	147	.263	38	100
Damion Easley	151	549	146	.266	20	65
Tony Clark	143	536	150	.280	31	99
Deivi Cruz	155	518	147	.284	13	58
Juan Encarnación	132	509	130	.255	19	74
Brad Ausmus	127	458	126	.275	9	54
Gabe Kapler	130	416	102	.245	18	49
Bobby Higginson	107	377	90	.239	12	46
Luis Polonia	87	333	108	.324	10	32
Karim García	96	288	69	.240	14	35
Frank Catalanotto	100	286	79	.276	11	18
Gregg Jefferies	70	205	41	.200	6	14
Bill Haselman	48	143	39	.273	4	3
Kimera Bartee	41	77	15	.195	0	0
Brian Hunter	18	55	13	.236	0	4
Gabe Alvarez	22	53	11	.208	2	8
Jason Wood	27	44	7	.159	1	1
Robert Fick	15	41	9	.220	3	3
Luis García	8	9	1	.111	0	0
José Macías	5	4	1	.250	1	1
Pitcher Totals	161	20	2	.100	0	1
Team Totals	161	5481	1433	.261	212	704

Note: Individual pitchers' batting statistics not included

=== Starting pitchers ===
Note: G = Games pitched; IP = Innings pitched; W = Wins; L = Losses; ERA = Earned run average; SO = Strikeouts

Player	G	IP	W	L	ERA	SO
Brian Moehler	32	196.1	10	16	5.04	106
Dave Mlicki	31	191.2	14	12	4.60	119
Jeff Weaver	30	163.2	9	12	5.55	114
Justin Thompson	24	142.2	9	11	5.11	83

=== Relief and other pitchers ===
Note: G = Games pitched; IP = Innings pitched; W = Wins; L = Losses; ERA = Earned run average; SO = Strikeouts

Player	G	IP	W	L	SV	ERA	SO
Willie Blair	39	134.0	3	11	0	6.85	82
Doug Brocail	70	82.0	4	4	2	2.52	78
C. J. Nitkowski	68	81.2	4	5	0	4.30	66
Dave Borkowski	17	76.2	2	6	0	6.10	50
Nelson Cruz	29	66.2	2	5	0	5.67	46
Todd Jones	65	66.1	4	4	30	3.80	106
Masao Kida	49	64.2	1	0	1	6.26	50
Bryce Florie	27	51.1	2	1	0	4.56	40
Matt Anderson	37	38.0	2	1	0	5.68	32
Francisco Cordero	20	19.0	2	2	0	3.32	19
Will Brunson	17	12.0	1	0	0	6.00	9
Sean Runyan	12	10.2	0	1	0	3.38	6
Erik Hiljus	6	8.2	0	0	0	4.15	1
Mel Rojas	5	6.1	0	0	0	22.74	6
Beiker Graterol	1	4.0	0	1	0	15.75	2
Felipe Lira	2	3.1	0	0	0	10.80	3
Willis Roberts	1	1.1	0	0	0	13.50	0
Team Pitching Totals	161	1421.0	69	92	33	5.17	976

== Farm system ==
Level	Team	League	Manager
AAA	Toledo Mud Hens	International League	Gene Roof
AA	Jacksonville Suns	Southern League	Dave Anderson
A	Lakeland Tigers	Florida State League	Mark Meleski
A	West Michigan Whitecaps	Midwest League	Bruce Fields
A-Short Season	Oneonta Tigers	New York–Penn League	Kevin Bradshaw
Rookie	GCL Tigers	Gulf Coast League	Gary Green

== See also ==
- 1999 in baseball
