= 1999 Seattle Mariners season =

1999 Seattle Mariners
- League: American League
- Division: West
- Ballpark: Kingdome, Safeco Field
- City: Seattle, Washington
- Record: 79–83 (.488)
- Divisional place: 3rd
- Owners: Hiroshi Yamauchi (represented by John Ellis)
- General managers: Woody Woodward
- Managers: Lou Piniella
- Television: KIRO-TV 7 KSTW; Fox Sports Northwest
- Radio: KIRO 710 AM (Dave Niehaus, Rick Rizzs, Ron Fairly, Dave Valle, Dave Henderson)

The Seattle Mariners' 1999 season was their 23rd since the franchise creation, and finished third in the American League West with a 79–83 (.488) record. In July, after 39 home games at the Kingdome, they moved into Safeco Field, and the Kingdome was demolished eight months later.

== Offseason ==
- November 9, 1998: Paul Spoljaric was traded by the Mariners to the Philadelphia Phillies for Mark Leiter.
- November 22, 1998: Butch Huskey was signed as a free agent by the Mariners.
- December 30, 1998: John Mabry was signed as a free agent by the Mariners.

== Regular season ==
- July 15, 1999: Immediately after the All-Star break, the Mariners played their first game at Safeco Field, but lost to the San Diego Padres 3–2 with 44,607 in attendance. It was the first park in major league history to host an interleague game on its inaugural day.

=== Season standings ===
AL West
Team	W	L	Pct.	GB	Home	Road
Texas Rangers	95	67	.586	—	51‍–‍30	44‍–‍37
Oakland Athletics	87	75	.537	8	52‍–‍29	35‍–‍46
Seattle Mariners	79	83	.488	16	43‍–‍38	36‍–‍45
Anaheim Angels	70	92	.432	25	37‍–‍44	33‍–‍48

=== Record vs. opponents ===
1999 American League record Source: MLB Standings Grid – 1999
Team	ANA	BAL	BOS	CWS	CLE	DET	KC	MIN	NYY	OAK	SEA	TB	TEX	TOR	NL
Anaheim	—	3–9	1–9	5–5	1–9	5–5	7–5	6–4	6–4	8–4	6–6	7–5	6–6	3–9	6–12
Baltimore	9–3	—	5–7	7–3	1–9	5–5	6–4	8–1	4–9	5–7	5–5	5–7	6–6	1–11	11–7
Boston	9–1	7–5	—	7–5	8–4	7–5	8–2	6–4	8–4	4–6	7–3	4–9	4–5	9–3	6–12
Chicago	5–5	3–7	5–7	—	3–9	7–5	6–6	8–3–1	5–7	3–7	4–8	6–4	5–5	6–4	9–9
Cleveland	9–1	9–1	4–8	9–3	—	8–5	7–5	9–3	3–7	10–2	7–3	5–4	3–7	5–7	9–9
Detroit	5–5	5–5	5–7	5–7	5–8	—	7–4	6–6	5–7	4–6	3–7	4–5	5–5	2–10	8–10
Kansas City	5–7	4–6	2–8	6–6	5–7	4–7	—	5–8	5–4	6–6	7–5	2–8	4–6	3–7	6–12
Minnesota	4–6	1–8	4–6	3–8–1	3–9	6–6	8–5	—	4–6	7–5	4–8	5–5	0–12	4–6	10–7
New York	4–6	9–4	4–8	7–5	7–3	7–5	4–5	6–4	—	6–4	9–1	8–4	8–4	10–2	9–9
Oakland	4–8	7–5	6–4	7–3	2–10	6–4	6–6	5–7	4–6	—	6–6	9–1	5–7	8–2	12–6
Seattle	6–6	5–5	3–7	8–4	3–7	7–3	5–7	8–4	1–9	6–6	—	8–4	5–8	7–2	7–11
Tampa Bay	5–7	7–5	9–4	4–6	4–5	5–4	8–2	5–5	4–8	1–9	4–8	—	4–8	5–8	4–14
Texas	6–6	6–6	5–4	5–5	7–3	5–5	6–4	12–0	4–8	7–5	8–5	8–4	—	6–4	10–8
Toronto	9–3	11–1	3–9	4–6	7–5	10–2	7–3	6–4	2–10	2–8	2–7	8–5	4–6	—	9–9

Mariners vs. National League
Team	NL West				
Team	AZ	COL	LAD	SDP	SFG
Seattle	2–1	2–1	0–3	2–4	1–2

=== Notable transactions ===
- April 27, 1999: Rafael Bournigal was purchased by the Mariners from the Texas Rangers.
- July 26, 1999: Butch Huskey was traded by the Mariners to the Boston Red Sox for Robert Ramsay.
- August 28, 1999: Mike Blowers was signed as a free agent by the Mariners.

==== Draft picks ====
- June 2, 1999: 1999 Major League Baseball draft
  - J. J. Putz was drafted by the Mariners in the 6th round. Player signed June 17, 1999.
  - Termel Sledge was drafted by the Seattle Mariners in the 8th round of the 1999 amateur draft. Player signed June 18, 1999.
  - Rich Harden was drafted by the Mariners in the 38th round, but did not sign.

=== Roster ===
1999 Seattle Mariners
Roster
Pitchers: 48 Paul Abbott; 31 Melvin Bunch; 26 Rafael Carmona; 28 Ken Cloude; 43 Tom Davey; 13 Jeff Fassero; 45 Ryan Franklin; 34 Freddy García; 54 John Halama; 27 Butch Henry; 32 Brett Hinchliffe; 23 Mark Leiter; 37 Dámaso Marte; 55 Gil Meche; 49 José Mesa; 50 Jamie Moyer; 30 José Paniagua; 23 Robert Ramsay; 33 Frankie Rodriguez; 57 Aaron Scheffer; 41 Steve Sinclair; 48 Sean Spencer; 56 Denny Stark; 41 Mac Suzuki; 40,41 Allen Watson; 52 Eric Weaver; 31 Todd Williams; 46 Jordan Zimmerman	Catchers: 17 Tom Lampkin; 6 Dan Wilson; Infielders: 25 David Bell; 4,16 Mike Blowers; 2 Rafael Bournigal; 26 Domingo Cedeño; 18 Russ Davis; 4 Giomar Guevara; 8 Carlos Guillén; 37 Ryan Jackson; 11 Edgar Martínez; 3 Alex Rodriguez; 21 David Segui	Outfielders: 19 Jay Buhner; 1 Charles Gipson; 24 Ken Griffey Jr.; 22 Brian Hunter; 42 Butch Huskey; 5 Raúl Ibañez; 47 John Mabry; 20 Matt Mieske; 12 Shane Monahan; 40 Ozzie Timmons	Manager: 14 Lou Piniella; Coaches: 29 Jesse Barfield; 7 John McLaren; 16,57 Sam Mejías; 15 Matt Sinatro; 10 Steve Smith; 35 Stan Williams

== Player stats ==
=== Batting ===
==== Starters by position ====
Note: Pos = Position; G = Games played; AB = At bats; H = Hits; Avg. = Batting average; HR = Home runs; RBI = Runs batted in

Pos	Player	G	AB	H	Avg.	HR	RBI
C	Dan Wilson	123	414	110	.266	7	38
1B	David Segui	90	345	101	.293	9	39
2B	David Bell	157	597	160	.268	21	78
SS	Alex Rodriguez	129	502	143	.285	42	111
3B	Russ Davis	124	432	106	.245	21	59
LF	Brian Hunter	121	484	112	.231	4	34
CF	Ken Griffey Jr.	160	606	173	.285	48	134
RF	Jay Buhner	87	266	59	.222	14	38
DH	Edgar Martínez	142	502	169	.337	24	86

==== Other batters ====
Note: G = Games played; AB = At bats; H = Hits; Avg. = Batting average; HR = Home runs; RBI = Runs batted in

Player	G	AB	H	Avg.	HR	RBI
Butch Huskey	74	262	76	.290	15	49
John Mabry	87	262	64	.244	9	33
Raúl Ibañez	87	209	54	.258	9	27
Tom Lampkin	76	206	60	.291	9	34
Rafael Bournigal	55	95	26	.274	2	14
Charles Gipson	55	80	18	.225	0	9
Ryan Jackson	32	68	16	.235	0	10
Mike Blowers	19	46	11	.239	2	7
Ozzie Timmons	26	44	5	.114	1	3
Domingo Cedeño	21	42	9	.214	2	8
Matt Mieske	24	41	15	.366	4	7
Carlos Guillén	5	19	3	.158	1	3
Shane Monahan	16	15	2	.133	0	0
Giomar Guevara	10	12	3	.250	0	2

=== Pitching ===
==== Starting pitchers ====
Note: G = Games pitched; IP = Innings pitched; W = Wins; L = Losses; ERA = Earned run average; SO = Strikeouts

Player	G	IP	W	L	ERA	SO
Jamie Moyer	32	228.0	14	8	3.87	137
Freddy García	33	201.1	17	8	4.07	170
Jeff Fassero	30	139.0	4	14	7.38	101
Gil Meche	16	85.2	8	4	4.37	47

==== Other pitchers ====
Note: G = Games pitched; IP = Innings pitched; W = Wins; L = Losses; ERA = Earned run average; SO = Strikeouts

Player	G	IP	W	L	ERA	SO
John Halama	38	179.0	11	10	4.22	105
Frank Rodriguez	28	73.1	2	4	5.65	47
Paul Abbott	25	72.2	6	2	3.10	68
Ken Cloude	31	72.1	4	4	7.96	35
Mac Suzuki	16	42.0	0	2	9.43	32
Brett Hinchliffe	11	30.2	0	4	8.80	14
Butch Henry	7	25.0	2	0	5.04	15
Robert Ramsay	6	18.1	0	2	6.38	11
Melvin Bunch	5	10.0	0	0	11.70	4

==== Relief pitchers ====
Note: G = Games pitched; W = Wins; L = Losses; SV = Saves; ERA = Earned run average; SO = Strikeouts

Player	G	W	L	SV	ERA	SO
José Mesa	68	3	6	33	4.98	42
José Paniagua	59	6	11	3	4.06	74
Steve Sinclair	18	0	1	0	3.95	15
Tom Davey	16	1	0	0	4.71	17
Todd Williams	13	0	0	0	4.66	7
Jordan Zimmerman	12	0	0	0	7.88	3
Rafael Carmona	9	1	0	0	7.94	0
Eric Weaver	8	0	1	0	10.61	14
Ryan Franklin	6	0	0	0	4.76	6
Dámaso Marte	5	0	1	0	9.35	3
Denny Stark	5	0	0	0	9.95	4
Aaron Scheffer	4	0	0	0	1.93	4
Allen Watson	3	0	1	0	12.00	2
Sean Spencer	2	0	0	0	21.60	2
Mark Leiter	2	0	0	0	6.75	1

== Farm system ==
Level	Team	League	Manager
AAA	Tacoma Rainiers	Pacific Coast League	Dave Myers
AA	New Haven Ravens	Eastern League	Dan Rohn
A	Lancaster JetHawks	California League	Darrin Garner
A	Wisconsin Timber Rattlers	Midwest League	Steve Roadcap
A-Short Season	Everett AquaSox	Northwest League	Terry Pollreisz
Rookie	AZL Mariners	Arizona League	Gary Thurman
