= 1999 Texas Rangers season =

1999 Texas Rangers
- American League West champions
- League: American League
- Division: West
- Ballpark: The Ballpark in Arlington
- City: Arlington, Texas
- Record: 95–67 (.586)
- Divisional place: 1st
- Owners: Tom Hicks
- General managers: Doug Melvin
- Managers: Johnny Oates
- Television: KXTX-TV; KXAS-TV; Fox Sports Southwest (Tom Grieve, Bill Jones)
- Radio: KRLD (Eric Nadel, Vince Cotroneo ) KESS-FM (Luis Mayoral, Josue Perez)

The 1999 Texas Rangers season was the 39th of the Texas Rangers franchise overall, their 28th in Arlington as the Rangers, and their 6th season at The Ballpark in Arlington. The Rangers finished first in the American League West with a record of 95 wins and 67 losses, registering the best winning percentage (.586) in franchise history until 2011.

Winning their third division title in four years, the Rangers repeated their 1998 postseason performance, again being swept by the New York Yankees in three games. This was the Rangers' last postseason appearance until 2010.

== Offseason ==
- December 10, 1998: Mark Clark was signed as a free agent by the Rangers.
- December 23, 1998: Gregg Zaun was sent to the Rangers by the Florida Marlins as part of a conditional deal.
- March 30, 1999: Rafael Bournigal was signed as a free agent by the Rangers.

== Regular season ==
=== Opening day starters ===
- Iván Rodríguez, C
- Lee Stevens, 1B
- Luis Alicea, 2B
- Todd Zeile, 3B
- Royce Clayton, SS
- Rusty Greer, LF
- Tom Goodwin, CF
- Juan González, RF
- Rafael Palmeiro, DH
- Rick Helling, RHP

=== Season standings ===
AL West
Team	W	L	Pct.	GB	Home	Road
Texas Rangers	95	67	.586	—	51‍–‍30	44‍–‍37
Oakland Athletics	87	75	.537	8	52‍–‍29	35‍–‍46
Seattle Mariners	79	83	.488	16	43‍–‍38	36‍–‍45
Anaheim Angels	70	92	.432	25	37‍–‍44	33‍–‍48

=== Record vs. opponents ===
1999 American League record Source: MLB Standings Grid – 1999
Team	ANA	BAL	BOS	CWS	CLE	DET	KC	MIN	NYY	OAK	SEA	TB	TEX	TOR	NL
Anaheim	—	3–9	1–9	5–5	1–9	5–5	7–5	6–4	6–4	8–4	6–6	7–5	6–6	3–9	6–12
Baltimore	9–3	—	5–7	7–3	1–9	5–5	6–4	8–1	4–9	5–7	5–5	5–7	6–6	1–11	11–7
Boston	9–1	7–5	—	7–5	8–4	7–5	8–2	6–4	8–4	4–6	7–3	4–9	4–5	9–3	6–12
Chicago	5–5	3–7	5–7	—	3–9	7–5	6–6	8–3–1	5–7	3–7	4–8	6–4	5–5	6–4	9–9
Cleveland	9–1	9–1	4–8	9–3	—	8–5	7–5	9–3	3–7	10–2	7–3	5–4	3–7	5–7	9–9
Detroit	5–5	5–5	5–7	5–7	5–8	—	7–4	6–6	5–7	4–6	3–7	4–5	5–5	2–10	8–10
Kansas City	5–7	4–6	2–8	6–6	5–7	4–7	—	5–8	5–4	6–6	7–5	2–8	4–6	3–7	6–12
Minnesota	4–6	1–8	4–6	3–8–1	3–9	6–6	8–5	—	4–6	7–5	4–8	5–5	0–12	4–6	10–7
New York	4–6	9–4	4–8	7–5	7–3	7–5	4–5	6–4	—	6–4	9–1	8–4	8–4	10–2	9–9
Oakland	4–8	7–5	6–4	7–3	2–10	6–4	6–6	5–7	4–6	—	6–6	9–1	5–7	8–2	12–6
Seattle	6–6	5–5	3–7	8–4	3–7	7–3	5–7	8–4	1–9	6–6	—	8–4	5–8	7–2	7–11
Tampa Bay	5–7	7–5	9–4	4–6	4–5	5–4	8–2	5–5	4–8	1–9	4–8	—	4–8	5–8	4–14
Texas	6–6	6–6	5–4	5–5	7–3	5–5	6–4	12–0	4–8	7–5	8–5	8–4	—	6–4	10–8
Toronto	9–3	11–1	3–9	4–6	7–5	10–2	7–3	6–4	2–10	2–8	2–7	8–5	4–6	—	9–9

=== Notable transactions ===
- April 27, 1999: Rafael Bournigal was purchased from the Rangers by the Seattle Mariners.
- June 2, 1999: 1999 Major League Baseball draft
  - Hank Blalock was drafted by the Rangers in the 3rd round. Player signed June 4, 1999.
  - Aaron Harang was drafted by the Rangers in the 6th round. Player signed June 7, 1999.

=== Roster ===
1999 Texas Rangers
Roster
Pitchers: 33 John Burkett; 54 Mark Clark; 23 Tim Crabtree; 46 Doug Davis; 13 Jeff Fassero; 38,40 Ryan Glynn; 53 Eric Gunderson; 32 Rick Helling; 50 Jonathan Johnson; 52 Dan Kolb; 37 Corey Lee; 28 Esteban Loaiza; 36 Mike Morgan; 51 Mike Munoz; 56 Danny Patterson; 40 Matt Perisho; 30 Aaron Sele; 43 Mike Venafro; 35 John Wetteland; 59 Jeff Zimmerman	Catchers: 7 Iván Rodríguez; 6 Gregg Zaun; Infielders: 10 Luis Alicea; 11 Royce Clayton; 44 Kelly Dransfeldt; 3 Mark McLemore; 25 Rafael Palmeiro; 15 Jon Shave; 4 Scott Sheldon; 16 Mike Simms; 9 Lee Stevens; 27 Todd Zeile	Outfielders: 19 Juan González; 24 Tom Goodwin; 41 Scarborough Green; 29 Rusty Greer; 39 Roberto Kelly; 21,38 Rubén Mateo	Manager: 26 Johnny Oates; Coaches: 17 Dick Bosman (Pitching); 20 Bucky Dent (Bench); 48 Larry Hardy (Bullpen); 8 Rudy Jaramillo (Hitting); 12 Ed Napoleon (First Base); 5 Jerry Narron (Third Base)

== Game log ==
=== Regular season ===
1999 regular season game log: 95–67 (Home: 51–30; Away: 44–37)
April: 13–10 (Home: 5–6; Away: 8–4)

#	Date	Time (CT)	Opponent	Score	Win	Loss	Save	Time of Game	Attendance	Record	Box/ Streak

May: 17–10 (Home: 9–5; Away: 8–5)

#	Date	Time (CT)	Opponent	Score	Win	Loss	Save	Time of Game	Attendance	Record	Box/ Streak

June: 15–13 (Home: 5–3; Away: 10–10)

#	Date	Time (CT)	Opponent	Score	Win	Loss	Save	Time of Game	Attendance	Record	Box/ Streak

July: 16–9 (Home: 9–4; Away: 7–5)

#	Date	Time (CT)	Opponent	Score	Win	Loss	Save	Time of Game	Attendance	Record	Box/ Streak
**70th All-Star Game in Boston, Massachusetts**

August: 18–12 (Home: 11–6; Away: 7–6)

#	Date	Time (CT)	Opponent	Score	Win	Loss	Save	Time of Game	Attendance	Record	Box/ Streak

September: 16–10 (Home: 12–6; Away: 4–4)

#	Date	Time (CT)	Opponent	Score	Win	Loss	Save	Time of Game	Attendance	Record	Box/ Streak

October: 0–3 (Home: 0–0; Away: 0–3)

#	Date	Time (CT)	Opponent	Score	Win	Loss	Save	Time of Game	Attendance	Record	Box/ Streak

Legend: = Win = Loss = Postponement
Bold = Rangers team member

=== Postseason Game log ===
1999 Postseason game log: 0–3 (Home: 0–1; Away: 0–2)
AL Division Series: vs. New York Yankees 0–3 (Home: 0–1; Away: 0–2)

#	Date	Time (CT)	Opponent	Score	Win	Loss	Save	Time of Game	Attendance	Series	Box/ Streak

Legend: = Win = Postponement
Bold = Rangers team member

== Player stats ==
=== Batting ===
==== Starters by position ====
Note: Pos = Position; G = Games played; AB = At bats; H = Hits; Avg. = Batting average; HR = Home runs; RBI = Runs batted in

Pos	Player	G	AB	H	Avg.	HR	RBI
C	Iván Rodríguez	144	600	199	.332	35	113
1B	Lee Stevens	146	517	146	.282	24	81
2B	Mark McLemore	144	566	155	.274	6	45
SS	Royce Clayton	133	465	134	.288	14	52
3B	Todd Zeile	156	588	172	.293	24	98
LF	Rusty Greer	147	556	167	.300	20	101
CF	Tom Goodwin	109	405	105	.259	3	33
RF	Juan González	144	562	183	.326	39	128
DH	Rafael Palmeiro	158	565	183	.324	47	148

==== Other batters ====
Note: G = Games played; AB = At bats; H = Hits; Avg. = Batting average; HR = Home runs; RBI = Runs batted in

Player	G	AB	H	Avg.	HR	RBI
Roberto Kelly	87	290	87	.300	8	37
Luis Alicea	68	164	33	.201	3	17
Rubén Mateo	32	122	29	.238	5	18
Greg Zaun	43	93	23	.247	1	12
Jon Shave	43	73	21	.288	0	9
Kelly Dransfeldt	16	53	10	.189	1	5
Scarborough Green	18	13	4	.308	0	0
Mike Simms	4	2	1	.500	0	0
Scott Sheldon	2	1	0	.000	0	0

=== Starting pitchers ===
Note: G = Games pitched; IP = Innings pitched; W = Wins; L = Losses; ERA = Earned run average; SO = Strikeouts

Player	G	IP	W	L	ERA	SO
Rick Helling	35	219.1	13	11	4.84	131
Aaron Sele	33	205.0	18	9	4.79	186
John Burkett	30	147.1	9	8	5.62	96
Mike Morgan	34	140.0	13	10	6.24	61
Mark Clark	15	74.1	3	7	8.60	44

==== Other pitchers ====
Note: G = Games pitched; IP = Innings pitched; W = Wins; L = Losses; ERA = Earned run average; SO = Strikeouts

Player	G	IP	W	L	ERA	SO
Esteban Loaiza	30	120.1	9	5	4.56	77
Ryan Glynn	13	54.2	2	4	7.24	39
Jeff Fassero	7	17.1	1	0	5.71	13
Matt Perisho	4	10.1	0	0	2.61	17

===== Relief pitchers =====
Note: G = Games; W = Wins; L = Losses; SV = Saves; ERA = Earned run average; SO = Strikeouts

Player	G	W	L	SV	ERA	SO
John Wetteland	62	4	4	43	3.68	60
Tim Crabtree	68	5	1	0	3.46	54
Jeff Zimmerman	65	9	3	3	2.36	67
Mike Venafro	65	3	2	0	3.29	37
Mike Munoz	56	2	1	1	3.93	27
Danny Patterson	53	2	0	0	5.67	43
Danny Kolb	16	2	1	0	4.65	15
Eric Gunderson	11	0	0	0	7.20	6
Doug Davis	2	0	0	0	33.75	3
Jonathan Johnson	1	0	0	0	15.00	3
Corey Lee	1	0	1	0	27.00	0

== ALDS ==
- Game 1 @ Yankee Stadium: Yankees 8, Rangers 0
- Game 2 @ Yankee Stadium: Yankees 3, Rangers 1
- Game 3 @ The Ballpark in Arlington: Yankees 3, Rangers 0

== Awards and honors ==
- Rafael Palmeiro, 1B, AL Gold Glove
- Rafael Palmeiro, 1B, Silver Slugger Award
- Iván Rodríguez, AL MVP
- Iván Rodríguez, C, Gold Glove
- Iván Rodríguez, Silver Slugger Award

All-Star Game

== Farm system ==
Level	Team	League	Manager
AAA	Oklahoma RedHawks	Pacific Coast League	Greg Biagini
AA	Tulsa Drillers	Texas League	Bobby Jones
A	Charlotte Rangers	Florida State League	Jim Byrd
A	Savannah Sand Gnats	South Atlantic League	Paul Carey
Rookie	Pulaski Rangers	Appalachian League	Bruce Crabbe
Rookie	GCL Rangers	Gulf Coast League	Darryl Kennedy
