= 1999 Chicago White Sox season =

1999 Chicago White Sox
- League: American League
- Division: Central
- Ballpark: Comiskey Park
- City: Chicago
- Owners: Jerry Reinsdorf
- General managers: Ron Schueler
- Managers: Jerry Manuel
- Television: WGN-TV; Fox Sports Chicago (Ken Harrelson, Tom Paciorek)
- Radio: WMVP (John Rooney, Ed Farmer); WIND (AM) (Hector Molina)

The 1999 Chicago White Sox season was the White Sox's 100th season. They finished with a record of 75–86, good enough for second place in the American League Central, 21.5 games behind the first place Cleveland Indians.

== Offseason ==
- November 11, 1998: Paul Konerko was traded by the Cincinnati Reds to the Chicago White Sox for Mike Cameron.

== Regular season ==
=== Season standings ===
AL Central
Team	W	L	Pct.	GB	Home	Road
Cleveland Indians	97	65	.599	—	47‍–‍34	50‍–‍31
Chicago White Sox	75	86	.466	21½	38‍–‍42	37‍–‍44
Detroit Tigers	69	92	.429	27½	38‍–‍43	31‍–‍49
Kansas City Royals	64	97	.398	32½	33‍–‍47	31‍–‍50
Minnesota Twins	63	97	.394	33	31‍–‍50	32‍–‍47

=== Game log ===
1999 Game Log: 75–86 (Home: 38–42; Away: 37–44)
April: 11–9 (Home: 6–5; Away: 5–4)

#	Date	Opponent	Score	Win	Loss	Save	Attendance	Record
1	April 5	@ Mariners	8–2	**Baldwin** (1–0)	Fassero	—	51,656	1–0
2	April 6	@ Mariners	11–3	**Parque** (1–0)	Moyer	—	20,435	2–0
3	April 7	@ Mariners	3–7	Garcia	**Snyder** (0–1)	Mesa	21,050	2–1
4	April 9	Royals	5–10	Barber	**Sirotka** (0–1)	—	26,243	2–2
5	April 10	Royals	4–9	Pittsley	**Navarro** (0–1)	Service	11,908	2–3
6	April 11	Royals	1–3	Appier	**Baldwin** (1–1)	Montgomery	10,503	2–4
7	April 13	@ Red Sox	0–6	Saberhagen	**Parque** (1–1)	—	31,874	2–5
8	April 15	@ Red Sox	4–0	**Snyder** (1–1)	Martinez	—	22,461	3–5
9	April 16	@ Royals	2–7	Appier	**Sirotka** (0–2)	—	11,326	3–6
10	April 17	@ Royals	6–5	**Lowe** (1–0)	Montgomery	**Howry** (1)	11,766	4–6
11	April 18	@ Royals	7–5	**Baldwin** (2–1)	Barber	**Howry** (2)	18,529	5–6
12	April 20	Mariners	3–1	**Parque** (2–1)	Fassero	**Howry** (3)	8,980	6–6
13	April 21	Mariners	2–1	**Snyder** (2–1)	Paniagua	**Howry** (4)	9,405	7–6
14	April 23	Tigers	5–0	**Sirotka** (1–2)	Blair	—	9,837	8–6
15	April 24	Tigers	3–1	**Navarro** (1–1)	Mlicki	**Howry** (5)	11,264	9–6
16	April 25	Tigers	4–9	Weaver	**Baldwin** (2–2)	—	15,370	9–7
17	April 28	Devil Rays	10–7	**Parque** (3–1)	Rekar	**Howry** (6)	—	10–7
18	April 28	Devil Rays	9–1	**Snyder** (3–1)	Saunders	—	10,300	11–7
19	April 29	Devil Rays	1–4	Alvarez	**Sirotka** (1–3)	Hernandez	10,022	11–8
20	April 30	@ Angels	1–3	Petkovsek	**Navarro** (1–2)	Percival	35,053	11–9

May: 11–16 (Home: 4–7; Away: 7–9)

#	Date	Opponent	Score	Win	Loss	Save	Attendance	Record
21	May 1	@ Angels	8–5	**Lundquist** (1–0)	Percival	**Howry** (7)	35,296	12–9
22	May 2	@ Angels	3–6	Olivares	**Parque** (3–2)	—	34,737	12–10
23	May 3	@ Angels	8–1	**Snyder** (4–1)	Belcher	—	31,995	13–10
24	May 4	@ Orioles	5–9 (10)	Timlin	**Lundquist** (1–1)	—	37,846	13–11
25	May 5	@ Orioles	0–8	Guzman	**Navarro** (1–3)	—	40,081	13–12
26	May 6	@ Orioles	2–4	Ponson	**Baldwin** (2–3)	Timlin	36,880	13–13
27	May 7	Athletics	7–1	**Parque** (4–2)	Candiotti	—	11,181	14–13
28	May 8	Athletics	5–3	**Snyder** (5–1)	Haynes	**Howry** (8)	15,489	15–13
29	May 9	Athletics	0–3	Oquist	**Sirotka** (1–4)	Jones	12,652	15–14
30	May 10	Rangers	5–2	**Navarro** (2–3)	Helling	—	12,670	16–14
31	May 11	Rangers	5–11	Zimmerman	**Howry** (0–1)	—	10,905	16–15
32	May 14	@ Yankees	8–2	**Parque** (5–2)	Hernandez	**Simas** (1)	33,793	17–15
33	May 15	@ Yankees	12–4	**Snyder** (6–1)	Mendoza	—	45,824	18–15
34	May 16	@ Yankees	1–2	Pettitte	**Sirotka** (1–5)	Rivera	51,046	18–16
35	May 17	Indians	9–13	Colon	**Navarro** (2–4)	—	17,101	18–17
36	May 18	Indians	0–13	Gooden	**Baldwin** (2–4)	—	13,429	18–18
37	May 19	Indians	7–13	Nagy	**Parque** (5–3)	—	14,854	18–19
38	May 22	Yankees	2–10	Clemens	**Snyder** (6–2)	—	—	18–20
39	May 22	Yankees	2–1	**Sirotka** (2–5)	Pettitte	**Simas** (2)	35,310	19–20
40	May 23	Yankees	7–8 (10)	Rivera	**Simas** (0–1)	—	22,845	19–21
41	May 24	@ Indians	10–3	**Lowe** (2–0)	Gooden	—	43,208	20–21
42	May 25	@ Indians	1–3	Nagy	**Parque** (5–4)	Jackson	42,161	20–22
43	May 26	@ Indians	2–6	Burba	**Sirotka** (2–6)	Shuey	43,228	20–23
44	May 27	@ Tigers	5–10	Weaver	**Snyder** (6–3)	—	13,465	20–24
45	May 28	@ Tigers	9–1	**Navarro** (3–4)	Thompson	—	20,437	21–24
46	May 29	@ Tigers	7–1	**Baldwin** (3–4)	Moehler	—	27,821	22–24
47	May 30	@ Tigers	2–3	Mlicki	**Parque** (5–5)	Jones	20,263	22–25

June: 15–13 (Home: 8–8; Away: 7–5)

#	Date	Opponent	Score	Win	Loss	Save	Attendance	Record
48	June 1	@ Blue Jays	6–2	**Sirotka** (3–6)	Escobar	—	20,399	23–25
49	June 2	@ Blue Jays	7–9	Carpenter	**Snyder** (6–4)	Koch	22,197	23–26
50	June 3	@ Blue Jays	10–3	**Navarro** (4–4)	Hentgen	—	33,673	24–26
51	June 4	Pirates	3–6 (11)	Wilkins	**Simas** (0–2)	—	12,238	24–27
52	June 5	Pirates	6–5	**Parque** (6–5)	Benson	**Foulke** (1)	20,066	25–27
53	June 6	Pirates	4–3	**Sirotka** (4–6)	Silva	**Howry** (9)	26,827	26–27
54	June 7	Astros	2–8	Lima	**Snyder** (6–5)	—	16,881	26–28
55	June 8	Astros	4–3	**Navarro** (5–4)	Reynolds	**Howry** (10)	11,836	27–28
56	June 9	Astros	4–13	Hampton	**Baldwin** (3–5)	—	12,138	27–29
57	June 11	@ Cubs	5–3 (6)	**Parque** (7–5)	Lieber	—	38,989	28–29
58	June 12	@ Cubs	8–2	**Sirotka** (5–6)	Trachsel	—	38,146	29–29
59	June 13	@ Cubs	6–4	**Simas** (1–2)	Aguilera	**Foulke** (2)	38,071	30–29
60	June 14	Devil Rays	9–7	**Snyder** (7–5)	Alvarez	**Howry** (11)	15,457	31–29
61	June 15	Devil Rays	2–3	Rupe	**Baldwin** (3–6)	Hernandez	11,347	31–30
62	June 16	Devil Rays	3–2 (11)	**Lowe** (3–0)	Charlton	—	10,903	32–30
63	June 17	Orioles	9–3	**Sirotka** (6–6)	Guzman	**Foulke** (3)	16,496	33–30
64	June 18	Orioles	2–3	Mussina	**Navarro** (5–5)	—	17,098	33–31
65	June 19	Orioles	9–11 (11)	Rhodes	**Foulke** (0–1)	Kamieniecki	30,232	33–32
66	June 20	Orioles	4–8	Johnson	**Baldwin** (3–7)	Timlin	22,755	33–33
67	June 22	Twins	6–1	**Parque** (8–5)	Hawkins	—	12,428	34–33
68	June 23	Twins	10–12	Sampson	**Sirotka** (6–7)	Trombley	14,770	34–34
69	June 24	Twins	5–3	**Navarro** (6–5)	Radke	**Howry** (12)	13,246	35–34
70	June 25	@ Red Sox	1–6	Cho	**Snyder** (7–6)	Guthrie	31,097	35–35
71	June 26	@ Red Sox	1–17	Martinez	**Baldwin** (3–8)	Wasdin	32,758	35–36
72	June 27	@ Red Sox	7–6	**Simas** (2–2)	Wakefield	**Howry** (13)	30,627	36–36
73	June 28	@ Red Sox	1–14	Saberhagen	**Sirotka** (6–8)	—	24,616	36–37
74	June 29	@ Royals	4–7	Appier	**Navarro** (6–6)	Service	15,027	36–38
75	June 30	@ Royals	10–9 (10)	**Howry** (1–1)	Service	—	14,026	37–38

July: 11–16 (Home: 7–9; Away: 4–7)

#	Date	Opponent	Score	Win	Loss	Save	Attendance	Record
76	July 1	@ Royals	6–2	**Baldwin** (4–8)	Pisciotta	—	18,697	38–38
77	July 2	Red Sox	1–6	Martinez	**Parque** (8–6)	—	23,266	38–39
78	July 3	Red Sox	11–2	**Sirotka** (7–8)	Rose	—	18,028	39–39
79	July 4	Red Sox	2–5	Saberhagen	**Navarro** (6–7)	Wakefield	16,495	39–40
80	July 6	Royals	7–8 (10)	Whisenant	**Foulke** (0–2)	—	11,251	39–41
81	July 7	Royals	7–1	**Parque** (9–6)	Suzuki	—	11,963	40–41
82	July 8	Royals	6–5	**Foulke** (1–2)	Byrdak	—	14,738	41–41
83	July 9	Cubs	3–2	**Howry** (2–1)	Adams	—	44,153	42–41
84	July 10	Cubs	2–10	Lieber	**Navarro** (6–8)	—	44,008	42–42
85	July 11	Cubs	3–6	Trachsel	**Baldwin** (4–9)	Adams	43,115	42–43
86	July 15	@ Cardinals	2–3 (13)	Croushore	**Rizzo** (0–1)	—	40,258	42–44
87	July 16	@ Cardinals	9–8	**Navarro** (7–8)	Acevedo	**Howry** (14)	46,909	43–44
88	July 17	@ Cardinals	6–8	Stephenson	**Ward** (0–1)	Bottalico	48,650	43–45
89	July 18	@ Brewers	4–5	Plunk	**Rizzo** (0–2)	—	27,295	43–46
90	July 19	@ Brewers	10–8 (12)	**Simas** (3–2)	Coppinger	**Foulke** (4)	33,250	44–46
91	July 20	@ Brewers	4–5	Plunk	**Lowe** (3–1)	Wickman	20,342	44–47
92	July 21	@ Twins	6–3 (10)	**Simas** (4–2)	Carrasco	**Howry** (15)	12,399	45–47
93	July 22	@ Twins	0–3	Mays	**Baldwin** (4–10)	Trombley	12,397	45–48
94	July 23	Blue Jays	1–2	Hamilton	**Parque** (9–7)	Koch	14,166	45–49
95	July 24	Blue Jays	6–5	**Eyre** (1–0)	Escobar	**Howry** (16)	25,674	46–49
96	July 25	Blue Jays	3–11	Carpenter	**Sirotka** (7–9)	—	18,299	46–50
97	July 26	Blue Jays	3–4 (11)	Frascatore	**Howry** (2–2)	Koch	17,631	46–51
98	July 27	Yankees	3–5	Hernandez	**Baldwin** (4–11)	Rivera	21,364	46–52
99	July 28	Yankees	11–3	**Castillo** (1–0)	Pettitte	—	22,523	47–52
100	July 29	Yankees	5–1	**Snyder** (8–6)	Cone	**Foulke** (5)	24,056	48–52
101	July 30	@ Indians	2–10	Colon	**Sirotka** (7–10)	—	43,181	48–53
102	July 31	@ Indians	10–13	Shuey	**Castillo** (1–1)	Jackson	43,209	48–54

August: 14–17 (Home: 7–7; Away: 7–10)

#	Date	Opponent	Score	Win	Loss	Save	Attendance	Record
103	August 1	@ Indians	6–3	**Baldwin** (5–11)	Nagy	**Howry** (17)	43,067	49–54
104	August 2	@ Tigers	6–2	**Wells** (1–0)	Moehler	—	26,637	50–54
105	August 3	@ Tigers	9–6	**Snyder** (9–6)	Thompson	**Howry** (18)	24,484	51–54
106	August 5	@ Athletics	6–7 (11)	Mathews	**Eyre** (1–1)	—	9,305	51–55
107	August 6	@ Athletics	1–9	Heredia	**Navarro** (7–9)	—	11,267	51–56
108	August 7	@ Athletics	1–11	Appier	**Parque** (9–8)	—	26,091	51–57
109	August 8	@ Athletics	5–7	Jones	**Foulke** (1–3)	—	22,821	51–58
110	August 9	@ Mariners	4–6	Meche	**Snyder** (9–7)	Mesa	42,978	51–59
111	August 10	@ Mariners	3–4	Moyer	**Howry** (2–3)	—	43,696	51–60
112	August 11	@ Mariners	2–11	Abbott	**Navarro** (7–10)	—	45,194	51–61
113	August 13	Rangers	4–2	**Wells** (2–0)	Burkett	**Howry** (19)	—	52–61
114	August 13	Rangers	7–4	**Baldwin** (6–11)	Glynn	—	20,444	53–61
115	August 14	Rangers	8–7	**Howry** (3–3)	Zimmerman	—	27,476	54–61
116	August 15	Rangers	0–10	Loaiza	**Snyder** (9–8)	—	22,708	54–62
117	August 16	Angels	6–1	**Sirotka** (8–10)	Washburn	—	18,212	55–62
118	August 17	Angels	4–3 (12)	**Howry** (4–3)	Holtz	—	14,943	56–62
119	August 18	Angels	4–3	**Baldwin** (7–11)	Magnante	**Howry** (20)	11,666	57–62
120	August 19	Angels	2–9	Ortiz	**Parque** (9–9)	—	14,171	57–63
121	August 21	@ Orioles	4–3	**Simas** (5–2)	Reyes	**Howry** (21)	42,901	58–63
122	August 21	@ Orioles	8–5 (10)	**Howry** (5–3)	Johns	**Foulke** (6)	47,735	59–63
123	August 22	@ Orioles	4–9	Johns	**Navarro** (7–11)	—	43,335	59–64
124	August 23	@ Devil Rays	10–2	**Baldwin** (8–11)	Witt	—	15,386	60–64
125	August 24	@ Devil Rays	5–6	Alvarez	**Parque** (9–10)	Hernandez	15,425	60–65
126	August 25	@ Devil Rays	6–1	**Foulke** (2–3)	Rupe	—	15,468	61–65
127	August 26	@ Devil Rays	7–9	White	**Snyder** (9–9)	Hernandez	16,475	61–66
128	August 27	Athletics	6–9	Olivares	**Sirotka** (8–11)	Isringhausen	14,270	61–67
129	August 28	Athletics	5–7	Heredia	**Navarro** (7–12)	Jones	27,121	61–68
130	August 29	Athletics	7–2	**Baldwin** (9–11)	Appier	**Foulke** (7)	16,403	62–68
131	August 30	Mariners	2–5	Garcia	**Parque** (9–11)	Mesa	—	62–69
132	August 30	Mariners	6–14	Cloude	**Castillo** (1–2)	Rodriguez	17,190	62–70
133	August 31	Mariners	4–11	Halama	**Snyder** (9–10)	—	12,579	62–71

September: 11–15 (Home: 4–6; Away: 7–9)

#	Date	Opponent	Score	Win	Loss	Save	Attendance	Record
134	September 1	Mariners	2–3	Meche	**Sirotka** (8–12)	Mesa	12,472	62–72
135	September 3	@ Rangers	4–10	Burkett	**Baldwin** (9–12)	—	29,266	62–73
136	September 4	@ Rangers	12–3	**Castillo** (2–2)	Loaiza	—	29,279	63–73
137	September 6	@ Rangers	6–8	Helling	**Parque** (9–12)	Wetteland	—	63–74
138	September 6	@ Rangers	3–6	Fassero	**Snyder** (9–11)	Wetteland	31,443	63–75
139	September 7	@ Angels	1–14	Cooper	**Sirotka** (8–13)	—	16,867	63–76
140	September 8	@ Angels	5–6 (10)	Percival	**Simas** (5–3)	—	17,246	63–77
141	September 10	Indians	6–14	Colon	**Wells** (2–1)	—	19,132	63–78
142	September 11	Indians	3–4	Burba	**Parque** (9–13)	Jackson	34,400	63–79
143	September 12	Indians	4–3	**Sirotka** (9–13)	Wright	**Howry** (22)	20,481	64–79
144	September 13	Tigers	2–3	Mlicki	**Snyder** (9–12)	Jones	12,217	64–80
145	September 14	Tigers	0–7	Nitkowski	**Myette** (0–1)	—	11,475	64–81
146	September 15	Tigers	3–1	**Baldwin** (10–12)	Moehler	**Foulke** (8)	11,528	65–81
147	September 17	@ Blue Jays	7–3	**Wells** (3–1)	Escobar	—	30,743	66–81
148	September 18	@ Blue Jays	7–4	**Navarro** (8–12)	Quantrill	**Howry** (23)	28,260	67–81
149	September 19	@ Blue Jays	3–2	**Sirotka** (10–13)	Halladay	**Howry** (24)	27,120	68–81
150	September 21	@ Yankees	1–3	Pettitte	**Baldwin** (10–13)	Rivera	29,248	68–82
151	September 22	@ Yankees	4–5	Rivera	**Navarro** (8–13)	—	27,549	68–83
152	September 23	@ Yankees	2–5	Clemens	**Parque** (9–14)	Rivera	33,586	68–84
153	September 24	@ Twins	2–6	Mays	**Myette** (0–2)	—	11,308	68–85
154	September 25	@ Twins	13–4	**Sirotka** (11–13)	Hawkins	—	26,324	69–85
155	September 26	@ Twins	3–0	**Baldwin** (11–13)	Ryan	**Howry** (25)	11,947	70–85
156	September 27	@ Twins	3–1	**Simas** (6–3)	Wells	**Foulke** (9)	9,022	71–85
157	September 29	Red Sox	2–6	Mercker	**Parque** (9–15)	—	—	71–86
158	September 29	Red Sox	4–2	**Foulke** (3–3)	Gordon	**Howry** (26)	12,974	72–86
159	September 30	Red Sox	5–2	**Lowe** (4–1)	Rose	**Howry** (27)	12,788	73–86

October: 2–0 (Home: 2–0; Away: 0–0)

#	Date	Opponent	Score	Win	Loss	Save	Attendance	Record
160	October 1	Twins	9–8	**Baldwin** (12–13)	Ryan	**Howry** (28)	11,887	74–86
161	October 2	Twins	6–1	**Wells** (4–1)	Perkins	—	17,904	75–86
162	October 3	Twins	1–1 (7)	**Game called (rain)** (game was not made up, tie does not count in record)			18,694	75–86

Legend: = Win = Loss = Tie
Bold = Chicago White Sox team member

=== Record vs. opponents ===
1999 American League record Source: MLB Standings Grid – 1999
Team	ANA	BAL	BOS	CWS	CLE	DET	KC	MIN	NYY	OAK	SEA	TB	TEX	TOR	NL
Anaheim	—	3–9	1–9	5–5	1–9	5–5	7–5	6–4	6–4	8–4	6–6	7–5	6–6	3–9	6–12
Baltimore	9–3	—	5–7	7–3	1–9	5–5	6–4	8–1	4–9	5–7	5–5	5–7	6–6	1–11	11–7
Boston	9–1	7–5	—	7–5	8–4	7–5	8–2	6–4	8–4	4–6	7–3	4–9	4–5	9–3	6–12
Chicago	5–5	3–7	5–7	—	3–9	7–5	6–6	8–3–1	5–7	3–7	4–8	6–4	5–5	6–4	9–9
Cleveland	9–1	9–1	4–8	9–3	—	8–5	7–5	9–3	3–7	10–2	7–3	5–4	3–7	5–7	9–9
Detroit	5–5	5–5	5–7	5–7	5–8	—	7–4	6–6	5–7	4–6	3–7	4–5	5–5	2–10	8–10
Kansas City	5–7	4–6	2–8	6–6	5–7	4–7	—	5–8	5–4	6–6	7–5	2–8	4–6	3–7	6–12
Minnesota	4–6	1–8	4–6	3–8–1	3–9	6–6	8–5	—	4–6	7–5	4–8	5–5	0–12	4–6	10–7
New York	4–6	9–4	4–8	7–5	7–3	7–5	4–5	6–4	—	6–4	9–1	8–4	8–4	10–2	9–9
Oakland	4–8	7–5	6–4	7–3	2–10	6–4	6–6	5–7	4–6	—	6–6	9–1	5–7	8–2	12–6
Seattle	6–6	5–5	3–7	8–4	3–7	7–3	5–7	8–4	1–9	6–6	—	8–4	5–8	7–2	7–11
Tampa Bay	5–7	7–5	9–4	4–6	4–5	5–4	8–2	5–5	4–8	1–9	4–8	—	4–8	5–8	4–14
Texas	6–6	6–6	5–4	5–5	7–3	5–5	6–4	12–0	4–8	7–5	8–5	8–4	—	6–4	10–8
Toronto	9–3	11–1	3–9	4–6	7–5	10–2	7–3	6–4	2–10	2–8	2–7	8–5	4–6	—	9–9

=== Detailed records ===
American League
Opponent	W	L	WP	RS	RA
AL East
Baltimore Orioles	3	7	0.300	47	63
Boston Red Sox	5	7	0.417	39	72
New York Yankees	5	7	0.417	58	49
Tampa Bay Devil Rays	6	4	0.600	62	42
Toronto Blue Jays	6	4	0.600	53	45
Total	25	29	0.463	259	271
AL Central
**Chicago White Sox**					
Cleveland Indians	3	9	0.250	60	98
Detroit Tigers	7	5	0.583	55	44
Kansas City Royals	6	6	0.500	65	71
Minnesota Twins	8	3	0.727	64	43
Total	24	23	0.511	244	256
AL West
Anaheim Angels	5	5	0.500	42	51
Oakland Athletics	3	7	0.300	43	59
Seattle Mariners	4	8	0.333	50	68
Texas Rangers	5	5	0.500	54	63
Total	17	25	0.405	189	241
National League
Chicago Cubs	4	2	0.667	27	27
Houston Astros	1	2	0.333	10	24
Milwaukee Brewers	1	2	0.333	18	18
Pittsburgh Pirates	2	1	0.667	13	14
St. Louis Cardinals	1	2	0.333	17	19
Total	9	9	0.500	85	102
Season Total	75	86	0.466	777	870

Month	Games	Won	Lost	Win %	RS	RA
April	20	11	9	0.550	89	84
May	27	11	16	0.407	132	146
June	28	15	13	0.536	148	173
July	27	11	16	0.407	133	144
August	31	14	17	0.452	152	188
September	26	11	15	0.423	107	125
October	2	2	0	1.000	16	10
Total	161	75	86	0.466	777	870

	Games	Won	Lost	Win %	RS	RA
Home	80	38	42	0.475	363	432
Away	81	37	44	0.457	413	437
Total	161	75	86	0.466	777	870

=== 1999 Opening Day lineup ===
Ray Durham, 2B

Mike Caruso, SS

Frank Thomas, 1B

Paul Konerko, DH

Magglio Ordóñez, RF

Greg Norton, 3B

Jeff Abbott, LF

Darrin Jackson, CF

Brook Fordyce, C

James Baldwin, P

=== Roster ===
1999 Chicago White Sox
**Roster**
**Pitchers**: 37 James Baldwin; 44 Chad Bradford; 43 Carlos Castillo; 51 Pat Daneker; 60 Joe Davenport; 36 Scott Eyre; 29 Keith Foulke; 46 Bob Howry; 50 Sean Lowe; 49 David Lundquist; 62 Aaron Myette; 38 Jaime Navarro; 40 Jim Parque; 61 Jesús Peña; 52 Todd Rizzo; 41 Bill Simas; 33 Mike Sirotka; 59 John Snyder; 47 Tanyon Sturtze; 32 Kip Wells	**Catchers**: 8 Brook Fordyce; 10 Mark Johnson; 15 Josh Paul; **Infielders**: 17 Mike Caruso; 34 Jason Dellaero; 5 Ray Durham; 14 Paul Konerko; 31 Greg Norton; 55 Liu Rodríguez; 35 Frank Thomas; 28 Craig Wilson	**Outfielders**: 25 Jeff Abbott; 26 McKay Christensen; 22 Darrin Jackson; 45 Carlos Lee; 39 Jeff Liefer; 30 Magglio Ordóñez; 27 Brian Simmons; 12 Chris Singleton	**Manager**: 7 Jerry Manuel; **Coaches**: 54 Nardi Contreras (Pitching); 18 Wallace Johnson (Third Base); 48 Von Joshua (Hitting); 53 Art Kusnyer (Bullpen); 20 Bryan Little (First Base); 21 Joe Nossek (Bench); 58 Mark Salas

== Player stats ==
=== Batting ===
Note: G = Games played; AB = At bats; R = Runs scored; H = Hits; 2B = Doubles; 3B = Triples; HR = Home runs; RBI = Runs batted in; BB = Base on balls; SO = Strikeouts; AVG = Batting average; SB = Stolen bases

Player	G	AB	R	H	2B	3B	HR	RBI	BB	SO	AVG	SB
Jeff Abbott, LF	17	57	5	9	0	0	2	6	5	12	.158	1
James Baldwin, P	35	2	1	1	0	1	0	1	0	1	.500	0
Mike Caruso, SS	136	529	60	132	11	4	2	35	20	36	.250	12
McKay Christensen, CF	28	53	10	12	1	0	1	6	4	7	.226	2
Pat Daneker, P	3	2	0	0	0	0	0	0	0	1	.000	0
Jason Dellaero, SS	11	33	1	3	0	0	0	2	1	13	.091	0
Ray Durham, 2B	153	612	109	181	30	8	13	60	73	105	.296	34
Brook Fordyce, C	105	333	36	99	25	1	9	49	21	48	.297	2
Keith Foulke, P	67	2	0	0	0	0	0	0	0	1	.000	0
Darrin Jackson, OF	73	149	22	41	9	1	4	16	3	20	.275	4
Mark Johnson, C	73	207	27	47	11	0	4	16	36	58	.227	3
Paul Konerko, 1B, DH	142	513	71	151	31	4	24	81	45	68	.294	1
Carlos Lee, LF	127	492	66	144	32	2	16	84	13	72	.293	4
Jeff Liefer, OF, 1B, DH	45	113	8	28	7	1	0	14	8	28	.248	2
Jaime Navarro, P	32	3	0	0	0	0	0	0	0	1	.000	0
Greg Norton, 3B, 1B	132	436	62	111	26	0	16	50	69	93	.255	4
Magglio Ordóñez, RF	157	624	100	188	34	3	30	117	47	64	.301	13
Jim Parque, P	31	5	0	2	0	0	0	0	0	1	.400	0
Josh Paul, C	6	18	2	4	1	0	0	1	0	4	.222	0
Liu Rodríguez, 2B, SS	39	93	8	22	2	2	1	12	12	11	.237	0
Brian Simmons, OF	54	126	14	29	3	3	4	17	9	30	.230	4
Chris Singleton, CF	133	496	72	149	31	6	17	72	22	45	.300	20
Mike Sirotka, P	32	8	1	2	0	0	0	0	0	3	.250	0
Frank Thomas, DH, 1B	135	486	74	148	36	0	15	77	87	66	.305	3
Bryan Ward, P	40	0	0	0	0	0	0	0	1	0	.---	0
Craig Wilson, 3B, SS, 2B	98	252	28	60	8	1	4	26	23	22	.238	1
Team totals	162	5644	777	1563	298	37	162	742	499	810	.277	110

=== Pitching ===
Note: W = Wins; L = Losses; ERA = Earned run average; G = Games pitched; GS = Games started; SV = Saves; IP = Innings pitched; H = Hits allowed; R = Runs allowed; ER = Earned runs allowed; HR = Home runs allowed; BB = Walks allowed; K = Strikeouts

Player	W	L	ERA	G	GS	SV	IP	H	R	ER	HR	BB	K
James Baldwin	12	13	5.10	35	33	0	199.1	219	119	113	34	82	123
Chad Bradford	0	0	19.64	3	0	0	3.2	9	8	8	1	5	0
Carlos Castillo	2	2	5.71	18	2	0	41.0	45	26	26	10	15	23
Pat Daneker	0	0	4.20	3	2	0	15.0	14	8	7	1	6	5
Joe Davenport	0	0	0.00	3	0	0	1.2	1	0	0	0	2	0
Scott Eyre	1	1	7.56	21	0	0	25.0	38	22	21	6	17	17
Keith Foulke	3	3	2.22	67	0	9	105.1	72	28	26	11	25	123
Bob Howry	5	3	3.59	69	0	28	67.2	58	34	27	8	41	80
Sean Lowe	4	1	3.67	64	0	0	95.2	90	39	39	10	47	62
David Lundquist	1	1	8.59	17	0	0	22.0	28	21	21	3	12	18
Aaron Myette	0	2	6.32	4	3	0	15.2	17	11	11	2	15	11
Jaime Navarro	8	13	6.09	32	27	0	159.2	206	126	108	29	72	74
Jim Parque	9	15	5.13	31	30	0	173.2	210	111	99	23	81	111
Jesús Peña	0	0	5.31	26	0	0	20.1	21	15	12	3	28	20
Todd Rizzo	0	2	6.75	3	0	0	1.1	4	2	1	0	4	2
Bill Simas	6	3	3.75	70	0	2	72.0	73	36	30	6	38	41
Mike Sirotka	11	13	4.00	32	32	0	209.0	236	108	93	24	59	125
John Snyder	9	12	6.68	25	25	0	129.1	167	103	96	27	49	67
Tanyon Sturtze	0	0	0.00	1	1	0	6.0	4	0	0	0	2	2
Bryan Ward	0	1	7.55	40	0	0	39.1	63	36	33	10	12	35
Kip Wells	4	1	4.04	7	7	0	35.2	33	17	16	2	15	29
Team totals	75	86	4.92	162	162	39	1438.1	1608	870	786	210	627	968

== Farm system ==
Level	Team	League	Manager
AAA	Charlotte Knights	International League	Tom Spencer
AA	Birmingham Barons	Southern League	Chris Cron
A	Winston-Salem Warthogs	Carolina League	Jerry Terrell
A	Burlington Bees	Midwest League	Nick Capra
Rookie	Bristol White Sox	Appalachian League	Gary Pellant
Rookie	AZL White Sox	Arizona League	Jerry Hairston, Sr.

LEAGUE CHAMPIONS: Charlotte, Burlington
