= 1999 Baltimore Orioles season =

Major League Baseball season

1999 Baltimore Orioles
- League: American League
- Division: East
- Ballpark: Oriole Park at Camden Yards
- City: Baltimore
- Record: 78–84 (.481)
- Divisional place: 4th
- Owners: Peter Angelos
- General managers: Frank Wren
- Managers: Ray Miller
- Television: WJZ-TV/WNUV/WBDC; Home Team Sports (Jim Palmer, Michael Reghi, Mike Flanagan)
- Radio: WBAL (AM) (Fred Manfra, Jim Hunter, Chuck Thompson)

The 1999 Baltimore Orioles season was the 99th season in Baltimore Orioles franchise history, the 46th in Baltimore, and the 8th at Oriole Park at Camden Yards. The Orioles finished fourth in the American League East with a record of 78 wins and 84 losses.

== Offseason ==
- December 1, 1998: Charles Johnson was traded by the New York Mets to the Baltimore Orioles for Armando Benítez.
- December 1, 1998: Albert Belle signed as a free agent with the Baltimore Orioles.
- December 7, 1998: Will Clark signed as a free agent with the Baltimore Orioles.
- December 7, 1998: B. J. Surhoff was signed as a free agent with the Baltimore Orioles.
- December 11, 1998: Rich Becker was released by the Baltimore Orioles.
- December 17, 1998: Doug Linton was signed as a free agent with the Baltimore Orioles.
- December 21, 1998: Rich Amaral was signed as a free agent with the Baltimore Orioles.
- January 15, 1999: Heathcliff Slocumb was signed as a free agent with the Baltimore Orioles.

== Cuban exhibition series ==
In a rare event on March 28, 1999, the Orioles staged an exhibition series against the Cuban national team in Havana. The Orioles won the game 3–2 in 11 innings. They were the first Major League team to play in Cuba since 1959, when the Los Angeles Dodgers faced the Orioles in an exhibition. The Cuban team visited Baltimore in May 1999. Cuba won the second game 10–6.

== Regular season ==
=== Season standings ===
AL East
Team	W	L	Pct.	GB	Home	Road
New York Yankees	98	64	.605	—	48‍–‍33	50‍–‍31
Boston Red Sox	94	68	.580	4	49‍–‍32	45‍–‍36
Toronto Blue Jays	84	78	.519	14	40‍–‍41	44‍–‍37
Baltimore Orioles	78	84	.481	20	41‍–‍40	37‍–‍44
Tampa Bay Devil Rays	69	93	.426	29	33‍–‍48	36‍–‍45

=== Record vs. opponents ===
1999 American League record Source: MLB Standings Grid – 1999
Team	ANA	BAL	BOS	CWS	CLE	DET	KC	MIN	NYY	OAK	SEA	TB	TEX	TOR	NL
Anaheim	—	3–9	1–9	5–5	1–9	5–5	7–5	6–4	6–4	8–4	6–6	7–5	6–6	3–9	6–12
Baltimore	9–3	—	5–7	7–3	1–9	5–5	6–4	8–1	4–9	5–7	5–5	5–7	6–6	1–11	11–7
Boston	9–1	7–5	—	7–5	8–4	7–5	8–2	6–4	8–4	4–6	7–3	4–9	4–5	9–3	6–12
Chicago	5–5	3–7	5–7	—	3–9	7–5	6–6	8–3–1	5–7	3–7	4–8	6–4	5–5	6–4	9–9
Cleveland	9–1	9–1	4–8	9–3	—	8–5	7–5	9–3	3–7	10–2	7–3	5–4	3–7	5–7	9–9
Detroit	5–5	5–5	5–7	5–7	5–8	—	7–4	6–6	5–7	4–6	3–7	4–5	5–5	2–10	8–10
Kansas City	5–7	4–6	2–8	6–6	5–7	4–7	—	5–8	5–4	6–6	7–5	2–8	4–6	3–7	6–12
Minnesota	4–6	1–8	4–6	3–8–1	3–9	6–6	8–5	—	4–6	7–5	4–8	5–5	0–12	4–6	10–7
New York	4–6	9–4	4–8	7–5	7–3	7–5	4–5	6–4	—	6–4	9–1	8–4	8–4	10–2	9–9
Oakland	4–8	7–5	6–4	7–3	2–10	6–4	6–6	5–7	4–6	—	6–6	9–1	5–7	8–2	12–6
Seattle	6–6	5–5	3–7	8–4	3–7	7–3	5–7	8–4	1–9	6–6	—	8–4	5–8	7–2	7–11
Tampa Bay	5–7	7–5	9–4	4–6	4–5	5–4	8–2	5–5	4–8	1–9	4–8	—	4–8	5–8	4–14
Texas	6–6	6–6	5–4	5–5	7–3	5–5	6–4	12–0	4–8	7–5	8–5	8–4	—	6–4	10–8
Toronto	9–3	11–1	3–9	4–6	7–5	10–2	7–3	6–4	2–10	2–8	2–7	8–5	4–6	—	9–9

=== Notable transactions ===
- April 30, 1999: Heathcliff Slocumb was released by the Baltimore Orioles.
- June 2, 1999: Brian Roberts was drafted by the Baltimore Orioles in the 1st round (50th pick) of the 1999 amateur draft. Player signed July 14, 1999.
- June 2, 1999: Érik Bédard was drafted by the Baltimore Orioles in the 6th round of the 1999 amateur draft. Player signed June 8, 1999.

=== Roster ===
1999 Baltimore Orioles
Roster
Pitchers: 25 Ricky Bones; 27 Rocky Coppinger; 27 Jim Corsi; 19 Scott Erickson; 51 Brian Falkenborg; 37 Mike Fetters; 57 Juan Guzmán; 55 Doug Johns; 41 Jason Johnson; 30 Scott Kamieniecki; 49 Doug Linton; 45 Gabe Molina; 35 Mike Mussina; 47 Jesse Orosco; 43 Sidney Ponson; 32 Al Reyes; 53 Arthur Rhodes; 25 Matt Riley; 52 B. J. Ryan; 51 Heathcliff Slocumb; 40 Mike Timlin	Catchers: 23 Tommy Davis; 13 Mike Figga; 21 Charles Johnson; 42 Lenny Webster; Infielders: 14 Mike Bordick; 12 Will Clark; 18 Jeff Conine; 11 Delino DeShields; 15 Jesse Garcia; 15 Jerry Hairston Jr.; 10 Ryan Minor; 24 Willis Otañez; 39 Calvin Pickering; 36 Jeff Reboulet; 8 Cal Ripken Jr.	Outfielders: 6 Rich Amaral; 9 Brady Anderson; 88 Albert Belle; 38 Gene Kingsale; 29 Derrick May; 17 B. J. Surhoff; Other batters: 3 Harold Baines	Manager: 31 Ray Miller; Coaches: 48 Terry Crowley (Hitting); 34 Marv Foley (First Base); 44 Elrod Hendricks (Bullpen); 54 Bruce Kison (Pitching); 33 Eddie Murray (Bench); 2 Sam Perlozzo (Third Base)

== Player stats ==
=== Batting ===
==== Starters by position ====
Note: Pos = Position; G = Games played; AB = At bats; H = Hits; Avg. = Batting average; HR = Home runs; RBI = Runs batted in

Pos	Player	G	AB	H	Avg.	HR	RBI
C	Charles Johnson	135	426	107	.251	16	54
1B	Jeff Conine	139	444	129	.291	13	75
2B	Delino DeShields	96	330	87	.264	6	34
SS	Mike Bordick	160	631	175	.277	10	77
3B	Cal Ripken Jr.	86	332	113	.340	18	57
LF	B.J. Surhoff	162	673	207	.308	28	107
CF	Brady Anderson	150	564	159	.282	24	81
RF	Albert Belle	161	610	181	.297	37	117
DH	Harold Baines	107	345	111	.322	24	81

==== Other batters ====
Note: G = Games played; AB = At bats; H = Hits; Avg. = Batting average; HR = Home runs; RBI = Runs batted in

Player	G	AB	H	Avg.	HR	RBI
Will Clark	77	251	76	.303	10	29
Jerry Hairston Jr.	50	175	47	.269	4	17
Jeff Reboulet	99	154	25	.162	0	4
Rich Amaral	91	137	38	.277	0	11
Ryan Minor	46	124	24	.194	3	10
Mike Figga	41	86	19	.221	1	5
Gene Kingsale	28	85	21	.247	0	7
Willis Otañez	29	80	17	.213	2	11
Derrick May	26	49	13	.265	4	12
Calvin Pickering	23	40	5	.125	1	5
Lenny Webster	16	36	6	.167	0	3
Jesse Garcia	17	29	6	.207	2	2
Tommy Davis	5	6	1	.167	0	0

=== Pitching ===
==== Starting pitchers ====
Note: G = Games pitched; IP = Innings pitched; W = Wins; L = Losses; ERA = Earned run average; SO = Strikeouts

Player	G	IP	W	L	ERA	SO
Scott Erickson	34	230.1	15	12	4.81	106
Sidney Ponson	32	210.0	12	12	4.71	112
Mike Mussina	31	203.1	18	7	3.50	172
Juan Guzmán	21	122.2	5	9	4.18	95
Jason Johnson	22	115.1	8	7	5.46	71
Matt Riley	3	11.0	0	0	7.36	6

==== Other pitchers ====
Note: G = Games pitched; IP = Innings pitched; W = Wins; L = Losses; ERA = Earned run average; SO = Strikeouts

Player	G	IP	W	L	ERA	SO
Doug Johns	32	86.2	6	4	4.47	50
Doug Linton	14	59.0	1	4	5.95	31
Rocky Coppinger	11	21.2	0	1	8.31	17

==== Relief pitchers ====
Note: G = Games pitched; W = Wins; L = Losses; SV = Saves; ERA = Earned run average; SO = Strikeouts

Player	G	W	L	SV	ERA	SO
Mike Timlin	62	3	9	27	3.57	50
Jesse Orosco	65	0	2	1	5.34	35
Scott Kamieniecki	43	2	4	2	4.95	39
Arthur Rhodes	43	3	4	3	5.43	59
Ricky Bones	30	0	3	0	5.98	26
Mike Fetters	27	1	0	0	5.81	22
Al Reyes	27	2	3	0	4.85	28
Gabe Molina	20	1	2	0	6.65	14
B.J. Ryan	13	1	0	0	2.95	28
Jim Corsi	13	0	1	0	2.70	8
Heathcliff Slocumb	10	0	0	0	12.46	12
Brian Falkenborg	2	0	0	0	0.00	1

== Farm system ==
Level	Team	League	Manager
AAA	Rochester Red Wings	International League	Dave Machemer
AA	Bowie Baysox	Eastern League	Joe Ferguson
A	Frederick Keys	Carolina League	Andy Etchebarren
A	Delmarva Shorebirds	South Atlantic League	Butch Davis
Rookie	Bluefield Orioles	Appalachian League	Duffy Dyer
Rookie	GCL Orioles	Gulf Coast League	Jesus Alfaro
