= 1999 Anaheim Angels season =

Major League Baseball season

1999 Anaheim Angels
- League: American League
- Division: West
- Ballpark: Edison International Field of Anaheim
- City: Anaheim, California
- Record: 70–92 (.432)
- Divisional place: 4th
- Owner: The Walt Disney Company
- General manager: Bill Bavasi
- Managers: Terry Collins, Joe Maddon
- Television: Fox Sports West; KCAL-9 •Rex Hudler, Steve Physioc; KVEA (Spanish)
- Radio: KLAC (AM 570) •Mario Impemba, Brian Barnhart; XPRS (Spanish) •José Tolentino, Ivan Lara
- Stats: ESPN.com; Baseball Reference

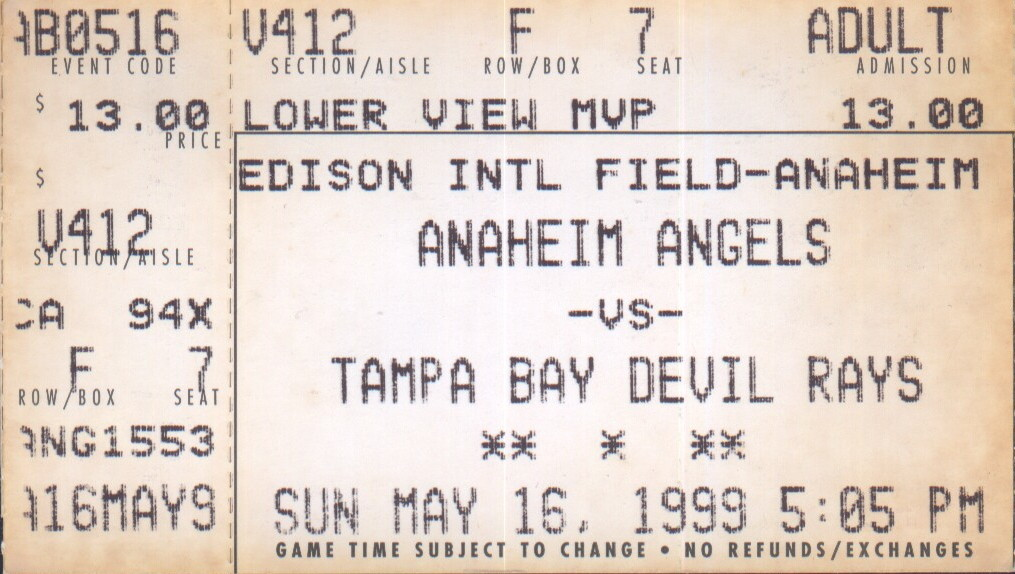
A ticket for a 1999 game between the Tampa Bay Devil Rays and the Angels.

The 1999 Anaheim Angels season was the 39th season of the Anaheim Angels franchise in the American League, the 34th in Anaheim, and their 34th season playing their home games at Edison International Field of Anaheim. The Angels finished fourth in the American League West with a record of 70 wins and 92 losses.

== Offseason ==
- November 16, 1998: Jeff Juden was released by the Anaheim Angels.
- November 18, 1998: Steve Decker was signed as a free agent with the Anaheim Angels.
- December 7, 1998: Jack McDowell signed as a free agent with the Anaheim Angels.
- December 7, 1998: Randy Velarde was signed as a free agent with the Anaheim Angels.
- December 23, 1998: Tim Belcher was signed as a free agent with the Anaheim Angels.

== Regular season ==
=== Season standings ===
AL West
Team	W	L	Pct.	GB	Home	Road
Texas Rangers	95	67	.586	—	51‍–‍30	44‍–‍37
Oakland Athletics	87	75	.537	8	52‍–‍29	35‍–‍46
Seattle Mariners	79	83	.488	16	43‍–‍38	36‍–‍45
Anaheim Angels	70	92	.432	25	37‍–‍44	33‍–‍48

=== Record vs. opponents ===
1999 American League record Source: MLB Standings Grid – 1999
Team	ANA	BAL	BOS	CWS	CLE	DET	KC	MIN	NYY	OAK	SEA	TB	TEX	TOR	NL
Anaheim	—	3–9	1–9	5–5	1–9	5–5	7–5	6–4	6–4	8–4	6–6	7–5	6–6	3–9	6–12
Baltimore	9–3	—	5–7	7–3	1–9	5–5	6–4	8–1	4–9	5–7	5–5	5–7	6–6	1–11	11–7
Boston	9–1	7–5	—	7–5	8–4	7–5	8–2	6–4	8–4	4–6	7–3	4–9	4–5	9–3	6–12
Chicago	5–5	3–7	5–7	—	3–9	7–5	6–6	8–3–1	5–7	3–7	4–8	6–4	5–5	6–4	9–9
Cleveland	9–1	9–1	4–8	9–3	—	8–5	7–5	9–3	3–7	10–2	7–3	5–4	3–7	5–7	9–9
Detroit	5–5	5–5	5–7	5–7	5–8	—	7–4	6–6	5–7	4–6	3–7	4–5	5–5	2–10	8–10
Kansas City	5–7	4–6	2–8	6–6	5–7	4–7	—	5–8	5–4	6–6	7–5	2–8	4–6	3–7	6–12
Minnesota	4–6	1–8	4–6	3–8–1	3–9	6–6	8–5	—	4–6	7–5	4–8	5–5	0–12	4–6	10–7
New York	4–6	9–4	4–8	7–5	7–3	7–5	4–5	6–4	—	6–4	9–1	8–4	8–4	10–2	9–9
Oakland	4–8	7–5	6–4	7–3	2–10	6–4	6–6	5–7	4–6	—	6–6	9–1	5–7	8–2	12–6
Seattle	6–6	5–5	3–7	8–4	3–7	7–3	5–7	8–4	1–9	6–6	—	8–4	5–8	7–2	7–11
Tampa Bay	5–7	7–5	9–4	4–6	4–5	5–4	8–2	5–5	4–8	1–9	4–8	—	4–8	5–8	4–14
Texas	6–6	6–6	5–4	5–5	7–3	5–5	6–4	12–0	4–8	7–5	8–5	8–4	—	6–4	10–8
Toronto	9–3	11–1	3–9	4–6	7–5	10–2	7–3	6–4	2–10	2–8	2–7	8–5	4–6	—	9–9

=== Notable transactions ===
- April 19, 1999: Dave Silvestri was signed as a free agent with the Anaheim Angels.
- July 29, 1999: Randy Velarde was traded by the Anaheim Angels with Omar Olivares to the Oakland Athletics for Jeff Davanon, Nathan Haynes, and Elvin Nina (minors).
- August 6, 1999: Charlie O'Brien was released by the Anaheim Angels.

=== Roster ===
1999 Anaheim Angels
Roster
Pitchers: 18 Juan Alvarez; 41 Tim Belcher; 45 Brian Cooper; 31 Chuck Finley; 27 Mike Fyhrie; 21 Shigetoshi Hasegawa; 44 Ken Hill; 65 Mike Holtz; 43 Al Levine; 52 Mike Magnante; 72 Jack McDowell; 46 Steve Mintz; 39 Omar Olivares; 36 Ramón Ortiz; 40 Troy Percival; 34 Mark Petkovsek; 58 Lou Pote; 60 Scott Schoeneweis; 23 Steve Sparks; 56 Jarrod Washburn	Catchers: 37 Steve Decker; 4 Bret Hemphill; 63 Bengie Molina; 22 Charlie O'Brien; 6 Matt Walbeck; Infielders: 9 Gary DiSarcina; 20 Trent Durrington; 17 Darin Erstad; 14 Troy Glaus; 5,75 Jeff Huson; 28 Chris Pritchett; 4 Dave Silvestri; 42 Mo Vaughn; 18 Randy Velarde	Outfielders: 16 Garret Anderson; 10 Mike Colangelo; 55 Jeff DaVanon; 25 Jim Edmonds; 8 Todd Greene; 33 Matt Luke; 3 Orlando Palmeiro; 15 Tim Salmon; 12,36 Tim Unroe; 12 Reggie Williams	Manager: 1 Terry Collins; 70 Joe Maddon; Coaches: 2 Larry Bowa (Third Base); 29 Rod Carew (Hitting); 47 Joe Coleman (Bullpen); 24 George Hendrick (First Base); 70 Joe Maddon (Bench); 38 Dick Pole (Pitching)

== Player stats ==
=== Batting ===
==== Starters by position ====
Note: Pos = Position; G = Games played; AB = At bats; H = Hits; Avg. = Batting average; HR = Home runs; RBI = Runs batted in

Pos	Player	G	AB	H	Avg.	HR	RBI
C	Matt Walbeck	107	288	69	.240	3	22
1B	Darin Erstad	142	585	148	.253	13	53
2B	Randy Velarde	95	376	115	.306	9	48
SS	Gary Disarcina	81	271	62	.229	1	29
3B	Troy Glaus	154	551	132	.240	29	79
LF	Orlando Palmeiro	109	317	88	.278	1	23
CF	Garret Anderson	157	620	188	.303	21	80
RF	Tim Salmon	98	353	94	.266	17	69
DH	Mo Vaughn	134	524	147	.281	33	108

==== Other batters ====
Note: G = Games played; AB = At bats; H = Hits; Avg. = Batting average; HR = Home runs; RBI = Runs batted in

Player	G	AB	H	Avg.	HR	RBI
Todd Greene	97	321	78	.243	14	42
Andy Sheets	87	244	48	.197	3	29
Jeff Huson	97	225	59	.262	0	18
Jim Edmonds	55	204	51	.250	5	23
Trent Durrington	43	122	22	.180	0	2
Bengie Molina	31	101	26	.257	1	10
Steve Decker	28	63	15	.238	0	5
Reggie Williams	30	63	14	.222	1	6
Charlie O'Brien	27	62	6	.097	1	4
Tim Unroe	27	54	13	.241	1	6
Chris Pritchett	20	45	7	.156	1	2
Matt Luke	18	30	9	.300	3	6
Bret Hemphill	12	21	3	.143	0	2
Jeff DaVanon	7	20	4	.200	1	4
Dave Silvestri	3	11	1	.091	0	1
Mike Colangelo	1	2	1	.500	0	0

=== Starting pitchers ===
Note: G = Games pitched; IP = Innings pitched; W = Wins; L = Losses; ERA = Earned run average; SO = Strikeouts

Name	G	IP	W	L	ERA	SO
Chuck Finley	33	213.1	12	11	4.43	200
Steve Sparks	28	147.2	5	11	5.42	73
Tim Belcher	24	132.1	6	8	6.73	52
Omar Olivares	20	131.0	8	9	4.05	49
Ken Hill	26	128.1	4	11	4.77	76
Ramón Ortiz	9	48.1	2	3	6.52	44
Brian Cooper	5	27.2	1	1	4.88	15
Jack McDowell	4	19.0	0	4	8.05	12

==== Other pitchers ====
Note: G = Games pitched; IP = Innings pitched; W = Wins; L = Losses; ERA = Earned run average; SO = Strikeouts

Player	G	IP	W	L	ERA	SO
Jarrod Washburn	16	61.2	4	5	5.25	39
Mike Fyhrie	16	51.2	0	4	5.05	26

===== Relief pitchers =====
Note: G = Games pitched; W = Wins; L = Losses; SV = Saves; ERA = Earned run average; SO = Strikeouts

Player	G	W	L	SV	ERA	SO
Troy Percival	60	4	6	31	3.79	58
Mark Petkovsek	64	10	4	1	3.47	43
Shigetoshi Hasegawa	64	4	6	2	4.91	44
Mike Magnante	53	5	2	0	3.38	44
Al Levine	50	1	1	0	3.39	37
Scott Schoeneweis	31	1	1	0	5.49	22
Mike Holtz	28	2	3	0	8.06	17
Lou Pote	20	1	1	3	2.15	20
Juan Alvarez	8	0	1	0	3.00	4
Steve Mintz	3	0	0	0	3.60	2

== Farm system ==
Level	Team	League	Manager
AAA	Edmonton Trappers	Pacific Coast League	Carney Lansford
AA	Erie SeaWolves	Eastern League	Garry Templeton
A	Lake Elsinore Storm	California League	Mario Mendoza
A	Cedar Rapids Kernels	Midwest League	Mitch Seoane
A-Short Season	Boise Hawks	Northwest League	Tom Kotchman
Rookie	Butte Copper Kings	Pioneer League	Joe Urso

Records
Preceded by 1998	Anaheim Angels seasons 1999	Succeeded by 2000
