= Dan Murray (baseball) =

American baseball player (born 1973)

- Pitcher
- Born: November 21, 1973 (age 52); Los Alamitos, California
- Batted: Right Threw: Right

MLB debut
- August 9, 1999, for the New York Mets

Last MLB appearance
- September 30, 2000, for the Kansas City Royals

MLB statistics
- Win–loss record: 0–0
- Earned run average: 5.76
- Strikeouts: 25
- Stats at Baseball Reference

Teams
- New York Mets (1999); Kansas City Royals (1999–2000)

Daniel Saffle Murray (born November 21, 1973) is a former Major League Baseball pitcher who played for two seasons. He pitched in one game for the New York Mets in 1999 and pitched in 14 games for the Kansas City Royals from 1999 to 2000.
