= Kelly Dransfeldt =

American baseball player (born 1975)

- Shortstop
- Born: April 16, 1975 (age 50); Joliet, Illinois, U.S.
- Batted: Right Threw: Right

MLB debut
- May 1, 1999, for the Texas Rangers

Last MLB appearance
- June 19, 2004, for the Chicago White Sox

MLB statistics
- Batting average: .205
- Home runs: 1
- Runs batted in: 11
- Stats at Baseball Reference

Teams
- Texas Rangers (1999–2001); Chicago White Sox (2004)

Kelly Daniel Dransfeldt (born April 16, 1975) is a former Major League Baseball shortstop for the Texas Rangers and Chicago White Sox.

He is a graduate of Morris Community High School in Morris, Illinois, as a shortstop and infielder. He attended the University of Michigan, and in 1995 and 1996, he played collegiate summer baseball with the Falmouth Commodores of the Cape Cod Baseball League. He was drafted by the Texas Rangers in the 4th round of the 1996 Major League Baseball draft.

He made his Major League debut on May 1, 1999, for the Texas Rangers. He hit .205 in his 51 major league games over the course of his 4-year major league career. After being granted free agency in 2004, Dransfeldt retired from baseball and focused on his other passion, the business world. He currently works as a stock portfolio advisor and gives in-depth market reports on local radio in Morris, Illinois, daily as a locally based stock market expert.
