= Rob Radlosky =

American baseball player (born 1974)

- Pitcher
- Born: January 7, 1974 (age 52); West Palm Beach, Florida, U.S.
- Batted: Right Threw: Right

MLB debut
- May 25, 1999, for the Minnesota Twins

Last MLB appearance
- June 22, 1999, for the Minnesota Twins

MLB statistics
- Win–loss record: 0–1
- Earned run average: 12.46
- Strikeouts: 3
- Stats at Baseball Reference

Teams
- Minnesota Twins (1999)

Robert Vincent Radlosky (born January 7, 1974) is an American former Major League Baseball (MLB) pitcher. Radlosky played for the Minnesota Twins in the 1999 season.

He was drafted by the Twins in the 22nd round of the 1993 amateur draft.
