= Luis García (shortstop) =

Dominican baseball player (born 1975)

- Shortstop
- Born: May 20, 1975 (age 51); San Francisco de Macorís, Dominican Republic
- Batted: Right Threw: Right

MLB debut
- April 5, 1999, for the Detroit Tigers

Last MLB appearance
- May 3, 1999, for the Detroit Tigers

MLB statistics
- Batting average: .111
- Runs: 0
- Hits: 1
- Stats at Baseball Reference

Teams
- Detroit Tigers (1999)

Luis Rafael Garcia (born May 20, 1975) is a Dominican former Major League Baseball shortstop. He played during one season at the major league level for the Detroit Tigers. He was signed by the Tigers as an amateur free agent in 1993. Garcia played his first professional season (in American baseball) with their Rookie league Bristol Tigers in 1993, and split his last season with the Triple-A teams of the Baltimore Orioles (Rochester Red Wings) and Pittsburgh Pirates (Nashville Sounds) in 2002.

Garcia's American-born son, also named Luis, signed with the Washington Nationals as an amateur free agent out of the Dominican Republic in 2016 and made his major league debut in 2020.
