= Liu Rodríguez =

Venezuelan baseball player (born 1976)

- Infielder
- Born: November 5, 1976 (age 49); Caracas, Venezuela
- Batted: Both Threw: Right

MLB debut
- June 9, 1999, for the Chicago White Sox

Last MLB appearance
- October 3, 1999, for the Chicago White Sox

MLB statistics
- Batting average: .237
- Home runs: 1
- Runs batted in: 12
- Stats at Baseball Reference

Teams
- Chicago White Sox (1999)

Liubiemithz Rodríguez Cevedo (born November 5, 1976) is a Venezuelan former professional baseball second baseman. He had 93 at bats in Major League Baseball for the Chicago White Sox in the 1999 season. He was a switch-hitter and threw right-handed.

== Career ==
=== Chicago White Sox ===
Rodríguez began his career with the Chicago White Sox organization in 1995 for the GCL White Sox. In 1996 and 1997, Rodríguez played for the A-ball Hickory Crawdads. In 1998, Rodríguez played for the advanced A-ball Winston-Salem Warthogs. On June 9, 1999, Rodríguez made his major league debut for the Chicago White Sox. Rodríguez made his final major league appearance in 1999, and spent 2000 with the Triple-A Charlotte Knights. In the majors, Rodríguez was a .237 career hitter with one home run and 12 RBI in 39 games. He played in Charlotte in 2001 as well. He became a free agent after the season.

=== Saraperos de Saltillo ===
In 2002, Rodríguez signed with the Saraperos de Saltillo of the Mexican League. He played in 47 games for the Saraperos, he hit .306/.377/.403, notching 57 hits.

=== Olmecas de Tabasco ===
Partway through the 2002 season, Rodríguez was traded to the Olmecas de Tabasco. He played in 22 games for Tabasco, hitting .288/.431/.327, including 15 hits. He became a free agent after the season.

=== Profumerie La Gardenia Grosseto ===
In 2003, Rodríguez signed with the Profumerie La Gardenia Grosseto of the Italian Baseball League. He became a free agent after the season.

=== Toros de Tijuana/Telemarket Ramini ===
In 2004, Rodríguez played for the Toros de Tijuana of the Mexican League and the Telemarket Ramini of the Italian Baseball League. He became a free agent after the season.

=== Langosteros de Cancun ===
In 2005, Rodríguez signed with the Langosteros de Cancun of the Mexican League. He played in 91 games in Cancun, notching a .331/.427/.508 batting line and 105 hits. He became a free agent after the season.

=== Newark Bears ===
In 2006, Rodríguez signed with the Newark Bears of the Atlantic League of Professional Baseball. Rodríguez hit .318/.383/.393 over 58 games in Newark and became a free agent following the conclusion of the season.

=== St. George Roadrunners ===
After not finding a team in 2007, Rodríguez signed with the St. George Roadrunners of the Golden Baseball League for the 2008 season. He played in 71 games for the club, hitting .317/.394/.449. He began the 2009 season with St. George before moving to the Atlantic league partway through the season.

=== Southern Maryland Blue Crabs ===
Partway through the 2009 season, Rodríguez joined the Southern Maryland Blue Crabs of the Atlantic League. He played in 36 games for the team, gathering 40 hits.

=== York Revolution ===
Further into the 2009 season, Rodríguez was traded to the York Revolution of the Atlantic League. He acquired 20 hits in 24 games for York to finish out the 2009 season. He began 2010 with York and played in 121 games with the team, hitting .296/.357/.391 along with 136 hits. In 2011, he played in 75 games for York, hitting .231/.297/.290. In 2012, Rodríguez played in 65 games for York, hitting .327/.364/.432. He became a free agent after the season.

=== De Angelis North East Knights ===
In 2013, Rodríguez signed with the De Angelis North East Knights of the Italian Baseball League. He appeared in 24 contests for the club and hit .245/.288/.287 with 23 hits before became a free agent at seasons end.

=== Milwaukee Brewers ===
On January 14, 2014, Rodríguez signed a minor league contract with the Milwaukee Brewers organization. He was assigned to the AZL Brewers to begin the season, but spent the year on the disabled list and was released by Milwaukee on October 31, 2014.

Rodríguez also played winterball in the Venezuelan League from 2006 to 2009 in between seasons.

== Coaching career ==
In 2026, Rodriguez was named as a coach for the Wisconsin Timber Rattlers the High-A affiliate of the Milwaukee Brewers.

== See also ==
- List of players from Venezuela in MLB
