= Aaron Scheffer =

American baseball player (born 1975)

- Pitcher
- Born: August 15, 1975 (age 50); Ypsilanti, Michigan
- Batted: Left Threw: Right

MLB debut
- June 13, 1999, for the Seattle Mariners

Last MLB appearance
- June 20, 1999, for the Seattle Mariners

MLB statistics
- Win–loss record: 0–0
- Earned run average: 1.93
- Strikeouts: 4
- Stats at Baseball Reference

Teams
- Seattle Mariners (1999)

Aaron Scheffer (born August 15, 1975) is a former Major League Baseball pitcher for the Seattle Mariners in 1999.

Scheffer attended John Glenn High School in Westland, Michigan and was named the school's "athlete of the year", playing baseball, football, and basketball as a senior in 1993. He signed as an undrafted free agent with the Mariners on August 2, 1993 and began his professional career the following year. He briefly reached the majors, pitching in four games in eight days in June 1999. He replace Rafael Carmona, who went on the disabled list and was sent down to the minors when Paul Abbott returned from injury. His MLB tenure ended poorly, as he allowed four runs on two singles, two walks, a hit batter, and a throwing error he committed in a loss at Cleveland.

Scheffer later played in the Florida Marlins and Oakland Athletics organizations.
