= Dan Perkins (baseball) =

American baseball player (born 1975)

- Pitcher
- Born: March 15, 1975 (age 50); Miami, Florida, U.S.
- Batted: Right Threw: Right

MLB debut
- April 7, 1999, for the Minnesota Twins

Last MLB appearance
- October 2, 1999, for the Minnesota Twins

MLB statistics
- Win–loss record: 1–7
- Earned run average: 6.54
- Strikeouts: 44
- Stats at Baseball Reference

Teams
- Minnesota Twins (1999)

Daniel Lee Perkins (born March 15, 1975) is an American former Major League Baseball player. A pitcher, he played for the Minnesota Twins in 1999.

Perkins last played professional baseball in 2001 with the Akron Aeros, a minor league team affiliate of the Cleveland Indians.
