= José Macías =

Panamanian baseball player (born 1972)

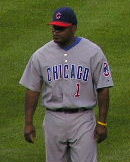
- Macías with the Chicago Cubs in 2004

Acereros de Monclova – No. 9
- Utility player / Coach
- Born: January 25, 1972 (age 54); Panama City, Panama
- Batted: Both Threw: Right

Professional debut
- MLB: May 12, 1999, for the Detroit Tigers
- NPB: March 25, 2006, for the Hokkaido Nippon Ham Fighters

Last appearance
- MLB: October 2, 2005, for the Chicago Cubs
- NPB: October 25, 2006, for the Hokkaido Nippon Ham Fighters

MLB statistics
- Batting average: .256
- Home runs: 26
- Runs batted in: 173

NPB statistics
- Batting average: .229
- Home runs: 3
- Runs batted in: 21
- Stats at Baseball Reference

Teams
- Detroit Tigers (1999–2002); Montreal Expos (2002–2003); Chicago Cubs (2004–2005); Hokkaido Nippon Ham Fighters (2006)

José Prado Macías Salazar (born January 25, 1972) is a Panamanian former professional baseball utility man who currently serves as the hitting coach for the Acereros de Monclova of the Mexican League. He played in Major League Baseball (MLB) for the Detroit Tigers, Montreal Expos, and Chicago Cubs from 1999–2005, and in Nippon Professional Baseball (NPB) for the Hokkaido Nippon-Ham Fighters in 2006. Listed at 5' 10", 173 lb., Macías was a switch-hitter and threw right-handed.

== Playing career ==
Macias was a reliable and versatile player, being able to cover several positions competently and adapt while maintaining the highest performance standards for the team. He was used mostly at third base, but also played in the middle infield and all three outfield positions. Eventually, he pitched in his home country of Panama and was ready to serve as an emergency catcher if need, as he expressed a desire to play all nine positions in a game if at any point his team can afford it.

Macias was released by the Cubs during the offseason in 2005. He then signed with the Hokkaido Nippon Ham Fighters of Japan, where he played in 2006. After that, he signed a Minor League contract with the Milwaukee Brewers and played the entire 2007 season with their Triple-A affiliate, the Nashville Sounds, and then agreed to a minor-league deal with the Pittsburgh Pirates in 2008, but was released during spring training. As a result, Macías signed a contract to play in the Mexican League with the Diablos Rojos del Mexico for that season and joined the Piratas de Campeche from 2009 to 2010.

In between, Macías played winter ball with the Leones del Caracas and Tiburones de La Guaira clubs of the Venezuelan Professional Baseball League, and for the Algodoneros de Guasave, Mayos de Navojoa, Tomateros de Culiacán and Yaquis de Obregón of the Mexican Pacific League, retiring in 2011.

== Coaching career ==
Macías has previously served as the bench coach for the Guerreros de Oaxaca of the Mexican League.

On November 19, 2025, Macías was hired to serve as the hitting coach for the Acereros de Monclova of the Mexican League.
