= Cleatus Davidson =

American baseball player (born 1976)

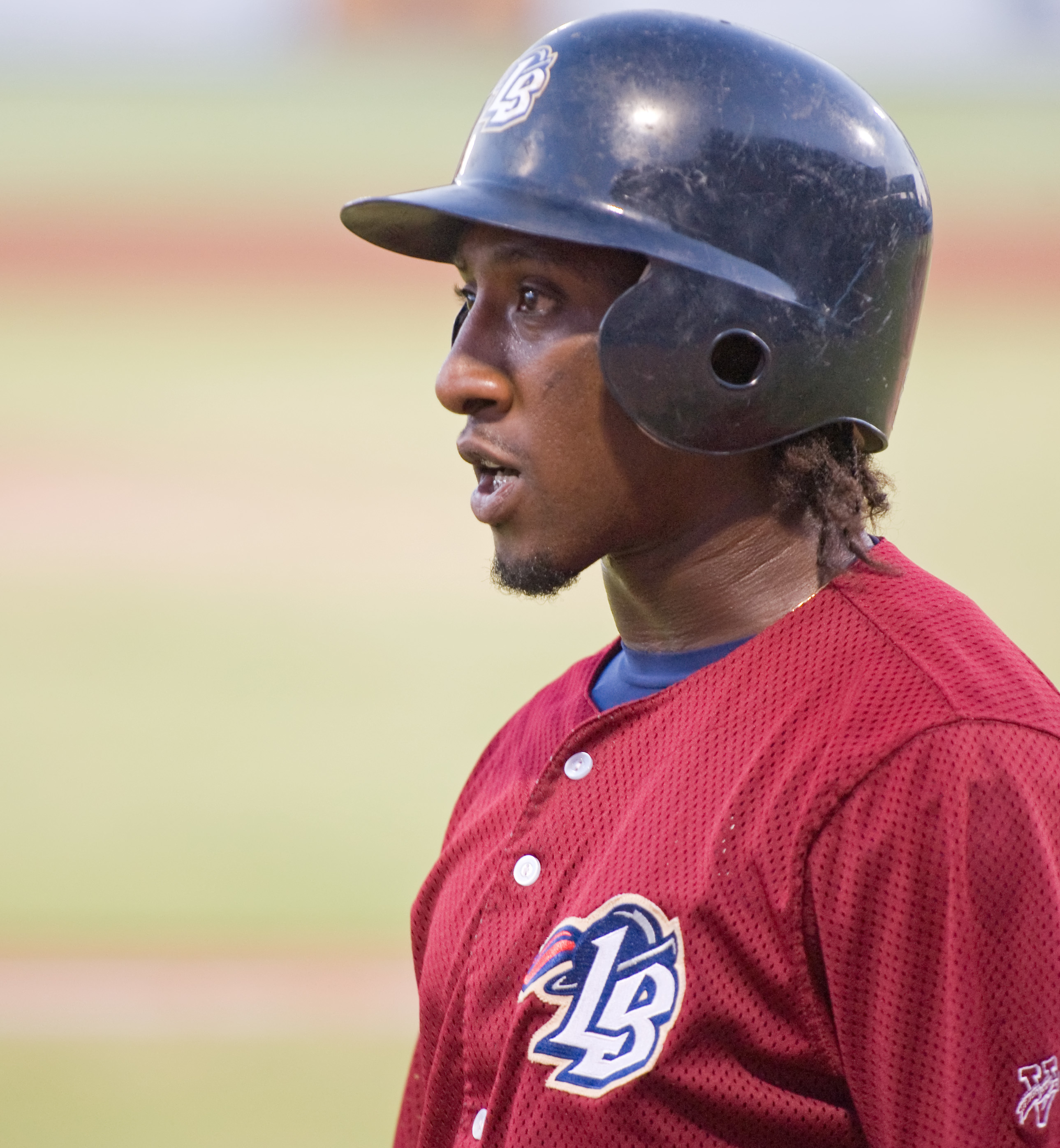
- Davidson with the Long Beach Armada in 2008
- Infielder
- Born: November 1, 1976 (age 48); Bartow, Florida, U.S.
- Batted: Switch Threw: Right

MLB debut
- May 30, 1999, for the Minnesota Twins

Last MLB appearance
- September 17, 1999, for the Minnesota Twins

MLB statistics
- Batting average: .136
- Home runs: 0
- Runs batted in: 3
- Stats at Baseball Reference

Teams
- Minnesota Twins (1999)

Cleatus Lavon Davidson (born November 1, 1976) is a former Major League Baseball infielder. He played 12 games for the Minnesota Twins in 1999, mostly at second base and shortstop.

From 2003 to 2008, Davidson played for independent teams. In 2008, he played for the Long Beach Armada of the Golden Baseball League.
