= Tim Kubinski =

American baseball player

- Pitcher
- Born: January 20, 1972 (age 54); Pullman, Washington, U.S.
- Batted: Left Threw: Left

MLB debut
- July 16, 1997, for the Oakland Athletics

Last MLB appearance
- October 2, 1999, for the Oakland Athletics

MLB statistics
- Win–loss record: 0-0
- Earned run average: 5.76
- Strikeouts: 17
- Stats at Baseball Reference

Teams
- Oakland Athletics (1997, 1999)

Timothy Mark Kubinski (born January 20, 1972) is an American former professional baseball pitcher. He played parts of two seasons in Major League Baseball, 1997 and 1999, for the Oakland Athletics.

== Early years ==
Kubinski was named co-San Luis Obispo County Player of the Year by the Telegram-Tribune in 1990 after winning all 12 of his mound appearances with a 1.02 ERA and batting .324 for SLO High School. He led the Tigers to the CIF Southern Section Division 4A title as a senior.

== Career ==
Kubinski attended UCLA, and in 1992 he played collegiate summer baseball with the Cotuit Kettleers of the Cape Cod Baseball League, where he was named a league all-star.

He was selected by Oakland in the 7th round of the 1993 MLB draft, as the Athletics used the 209th overall choice to pick him.
