= Jeff D'Amico (Kansas City Royals pitcher) =

American baseball player (born 1974)

- Pitcher
- Born: November 9, 1974 (age 51); Inglewood, California, U.S.
- Batted: Right Threw: Right

MLB debut
- June 3, 2000, for the Kansas City Royals

Last MLB appearance
- July 7, 2000, for the Kansas City Royals

MLB statistics
- Win–loss record: 0–1
- Earned run average: 9.22
- Strikeouts: 9
- Stats at Baseball Reference

Teams
- Kansas City Royals (2000)

Jeffrey Michael D'Amico (born November 9, 1974) is an American former Major League Baseball pitcher for the Kansas City Royals. He pitched just seven games for them during the 2000 season, including a single start against the Oakland Athletics on June 18, which the Royals lost 21–3.
