= Blake Stein =

American baseball player (born 1973)

- Pitcher
- Born: August 3, 1973 (age 52); McComb, Mississippi, U.S.
- Batted: Right Threw: Right

MLB debut
- May 10, 1998, for the Oakland Athletics

Last MLB appearance
- September 8, 2002, for the Kansas City Royals

MLB statistics
- Win–loss record: 21–28
- Earned run average: 5.41
- Strikeouts: 369
- Stats at Baseball Reference

Teams
- Oakland Athletics (1998–1999); Kansas City Royals (1999–2002)

William Blake Stein (born August 3, 1973) is an American former professional baseball pitcher. He played in Major League Baseball (MLB) for the Oakland Athletics and Kansas City Royals from 1998-2002.

== Career ==
On June 2, 1994, he was drafted by the St. Louis Cardinals in the 6th round of the 1994 amateur draft. On July 31, 1997, he was traded by the Cardinals with Eric Ludwick and T. J. Mathews to the Oakland Athletics for Mark McGwire. On July 31, 1999, he was traded by the Athletics with Jeff D'Amico and Brad Rigby to the Kansas City Royals for Kevin Appier. On June 17, 2001, Stein fanned eight straight Brewers for the Royals, and 11 in five 2/3 innings, but Milwaukee defeated Kansas City, 5-2. Only Nolan Ryan (twice), Ron Davis, and Roger Clemens had struck out eight in a row in the American League. Tigers pitcher Doug Fister would break this record on September 27, 2012, striking out nine Royals, but receiving a no-decision in a 5-4 Detroit victory.

When starting for the Athletics against the Cleveland Indians on August 31, 1998, Stein was unable to get out any of the first eight Indian batters out - the inning started walk-hit batsman-walk-single-single-walk-single-single, giving the Indians a 6-0 lead. Stein was pulled from the game by manager Art Howe, and became the first starting pitcher in Major League history to fail to get out any of the first eight batters of the game.

After retiring from baseball, Stein attended Spring Hill College and graduated in 2005. After over a decade as its Assistant Principal, he is now the President of McGill-Toolen Catholic High School.

== See also ==
- List of Major League Baseball single-inning strikeout leaders
