= 1999 New York Yankees season =

Season for the Major League Baseball team the New York Yankees

1999 New York Yankees
- World Series champions American League champions American League East champions
- League: American League
- Division: East
- Ballpark: Yankee Stadium
- City: New York City
- Record: 98–64 (.605)
- Divisional place: 1st
- Owners: George Steinbrenner
- General managers: Brian Cashman
- Managers: Joe Torre
- Television: WNYW (Bobby Murcer, Tim McCarver); MSG (Ken Singleton, Jim Kaat, Al Trautwig, Suzyn Waldman)
- Radio: WABC (AM) (John Sterling, Michael Kay)

The 1999 New York Yankees season was the 97th season for the Bronx-based Major League Baseball team. The team finished with a record of 98–64 finishing 4 games ahead of the Boston Red Sox. New York was managed by Joe Torre. The Yankees played at Yankee Stadium. In the playoffs, they got to the World Series and defeated the Atlanta Braves in 4 games to win their 25th World Series title. By winning their 25th World Series, the New York Yankees became the most successful team in North America, a record previously held by the NHL's Montreal Canadiens. In that year, free-to-air broadcasts returned to WNYW, which had been the first Yankees television broadcaster in 1947, while cable broadcasts continued on MSG.

== Offseason ==
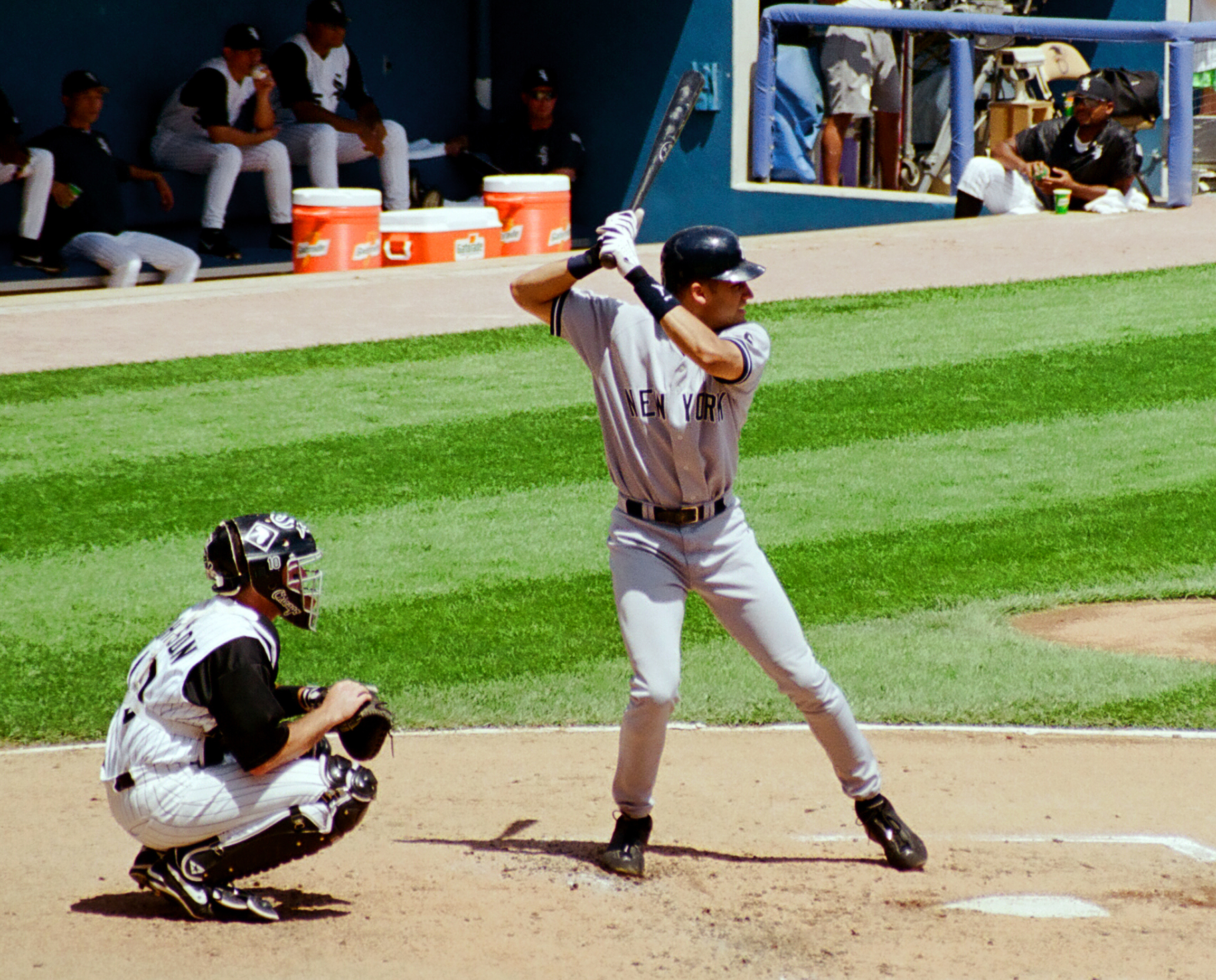
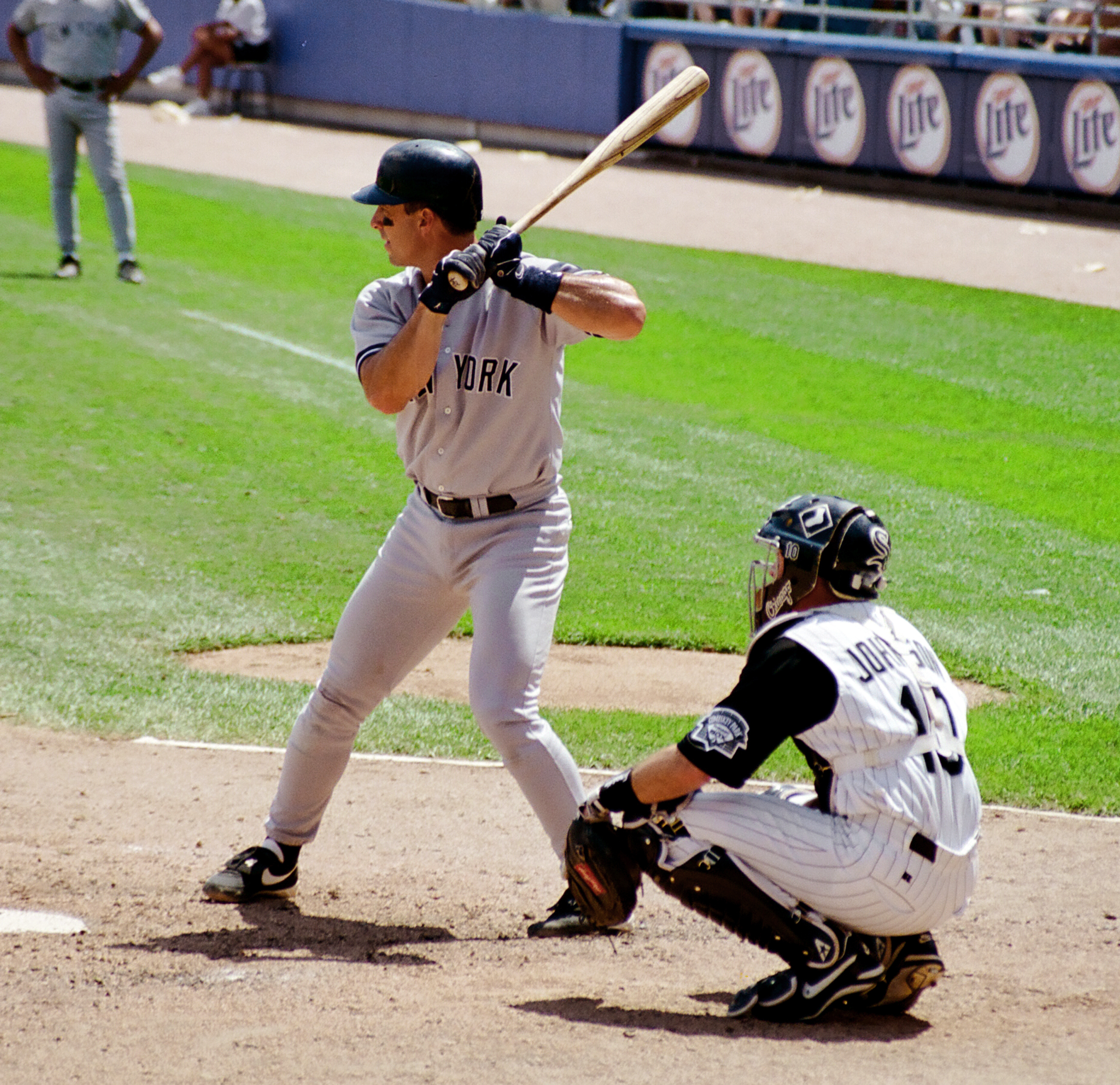
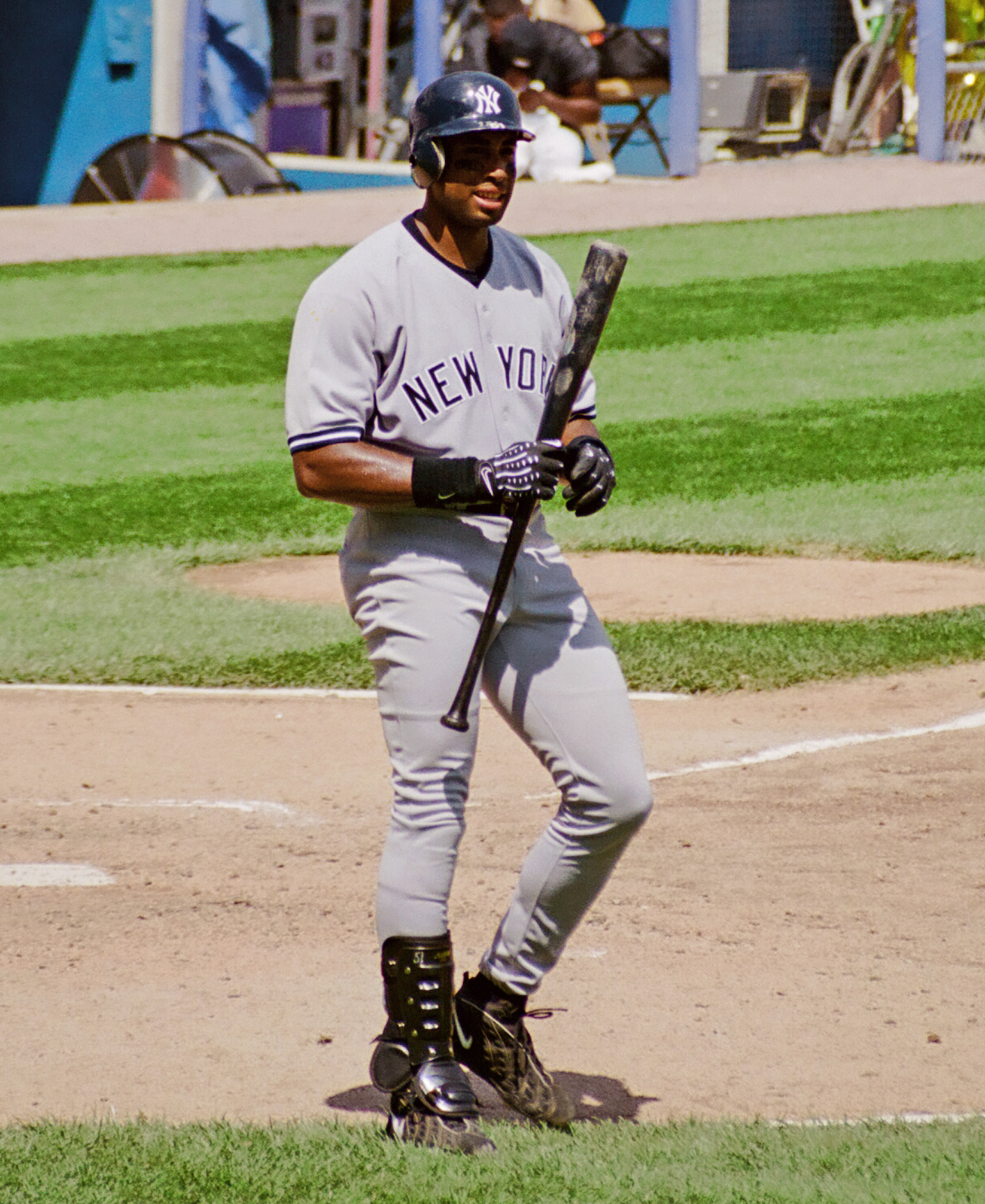
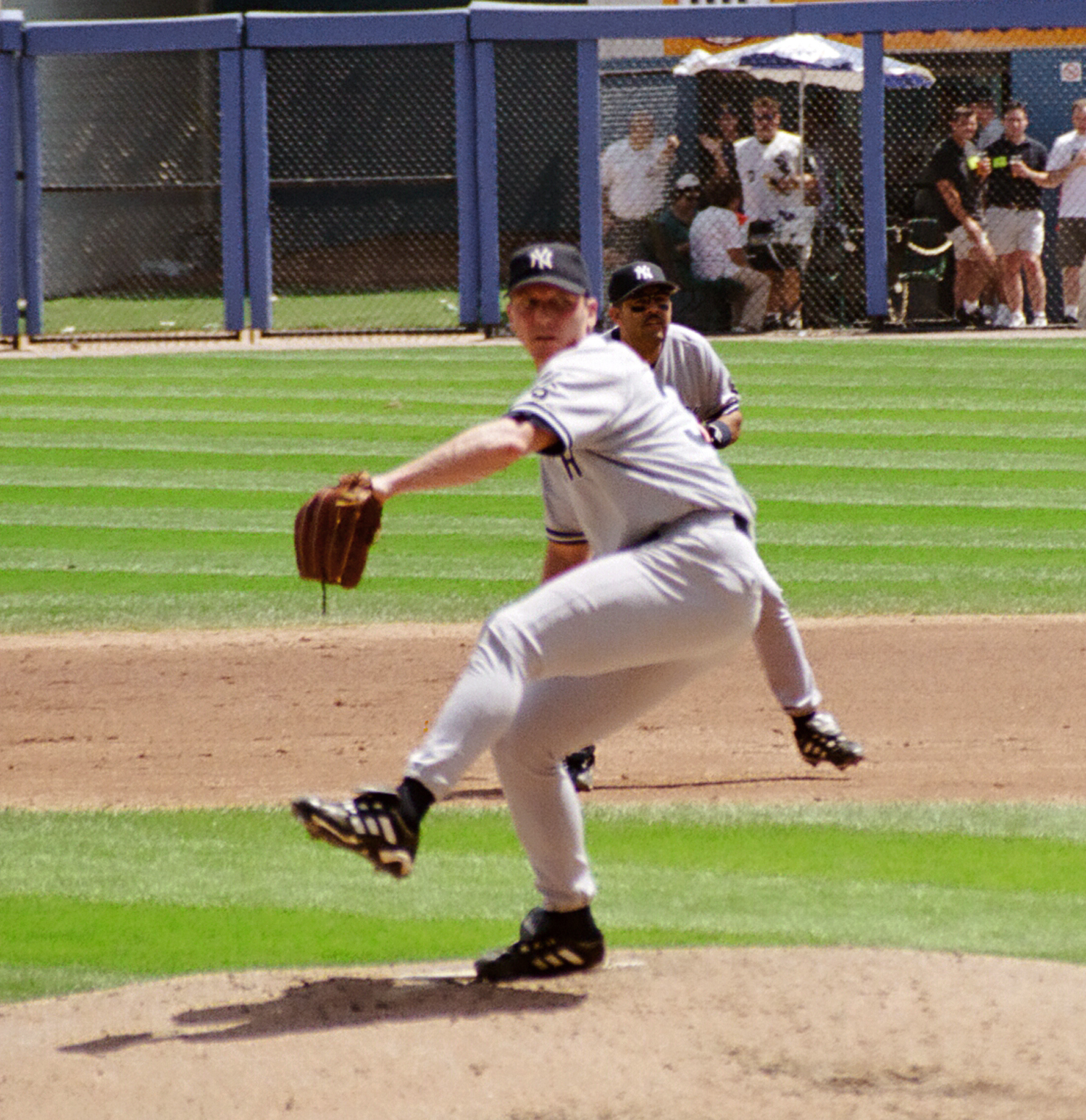
Major figures in the 1999 Yankees season included (clockwise from top left) Derek Jeter, Tino Martinez, David Cone, and Bernie Williams.
- November 10, 1998: Scott Brosius resigned as a free agent with the New York Yankees.
- November 11, 1998: David Cone resigned as a free agent with the New York Yankees.
- November 25, 1998: Bernie Williams resigned as a free agent with the New York Yankees.
- February 5, 1999: Jeff Juden was signed as a free agent with the New York Yankees.
- February 18, 1999: Roger Clemens was traded by the Toronto Blue Jays to the New York Yankees for Homer Bush, Graeme Lloyd, and David Wells.
- March 30, 1999: Izzy Molina was traded by the Arizona Diamondbacks with Ben Ford to the New York Yankees for Darren Holmes and cash.

=== Notable transactions ===
- April 5, 1999: Darryl Strawberry signed as a free agent with the New York Yankees.
- July 31, 1999: Jim Leyritz was traded by the San Diego Padres to the New York Yankees for Geraldo Padua (minors).

== Season standings ==
AL East
| Team | W | L | Pct. | GB | Home | Road |
|---|---|---|---|---|---|---|
| New York Yankees | 98 | 64 | .605 | — | 48‍–‍33 | 50‍–‍31 |
| Boston Red Sox | 94 | 68 | .580 | 4 | 49‍–‍32 | 45‍–‍36 |
| Toronto Blue Jays | 84 | 78 | .519 | 14 | 40‍–‍41 | 44‍–‍37 |
| Baltimore Orioles | 78 | 84 | .481 | 20 | 41‍–‍40 | 37‍–‍44 |
| Tampa Bay Devil Rays | 69 | 93 | .426 | 29 | 33‍–‍48 | 36‍–‍45 |

=== Record vs. opponents ===
1999 American League record Source: MLB Standings Grid – 1999
| Team | ANA | BAL | BOS | CWS | CLE | DET | KC | MIN | NYY | OAK | SEA | TB | TEX | TOR | NL |
|---|---|---|---|---|---|---|---|---|---|---|---|---|---|---|---|
| Anaheim | — | 3–9 | 1–9 | 5–5 | 1–9 | 5–5 | 7–5 | 6–4 | 6–4 | 8–4 | 6–6 | 7–5 | 6–6 | 3–9 | 6–12 |
| Baltimore | 9–3 | — | 5–7 | 7–3 | 1–9 | 5–5 | 6–4 | 8–1 | 4–9 | 5–7 | 5–5 | 5–7 | 6–6 | 1–11 | 11–7 |
| Boston | 9–1 | 7–5 | — | 7–5 | 8–4 | 7–5 | 8–2 | 6–4 | 8–4 | 4–6 | 7–3 | 4–9 | 4–5 | 9–3 | 6–12 |
| Chicago | 5–5 | 3–7 | 5–7 | — | 3–9 | 7–5 | 6–6 | 8–3–1 | 5–7 | 3–7 | 4–8 | 6–4 | 5–5 | 6–4 | 9–9 |
| Cleveland | 9–1 | 9–1 | 4–8 | 9–3 | — | 8–5 | 7–5 | 9–3 | 3–7 | 10–2 | 7–3 | 5–4 | 3–7 | 5–7 | 9–9 |
| Detroit | 5–5 | 5–5 | 5–7 | 5–7 | 5–8 | — | 7–4 | 6–6 | 5–7 | 4–6 | 3–7 | 4–5 | 5–5 | 2–10 | 8–10 |
| Kansas City | 5–7 | 4–6 | 2–8 | 6–6 | 5–7 | 4–7 | — | 5–8 | 5–4 | 6–6 | 7–5 | 2–8 | 4–6 | 3–7 | 6–12 |
| Minnesota | 4–6 | 1–8 | 4–6 | 3–8–1 | 3–9 | 6–6 | 8–5 | — | 4–6 | 7–5 | 4–8 | 5–5 | 0–12 | 4–6 | 10–7 |
| New York | 4–6 | 9–4 | 4–8 | 7–5 | 7–3 | 7–5 | 4–5 | 6–4 | — | 6–4 | 9–1 | 8–4 | 8–4 | 10–2 | 9–9 |
| Oakland | 4–8 | 7–5 | 6–4 | 7–3 | 2–10 | 6–4 | 6–6 | 5–7 | 4–6 | — | 6–6 | 9–1 | 5–7 | 8–2 | 12–6 |
| Seattle | 6–6 | 5–5 | 3–7 | 8–4 | 3–7 | 7–3 | 5–7 | 8–4 | 1–9 | 6–6 | — | 8–4 | 5–8 | 7–2 | 7–11 |
| Tampa Bay | 5–7 | 7–5 | 9–4 | 4–6 | 4–5 | 5–4 | 8–2 | 5–5 | 4–8 | 1–9 | 4–8 | — | 4–8 | 5–8 | 4–14 |
| Texas | 6–6 | 6–6 | 5–4 | 5–5 | 7–3 | 5–5 | 6–4 | 12–0 | 4–8 | 7–5 | 8–5 | 8–4 | — | 6–4 | 10–8 |
| Toronto | 9–3 | 11–1 | 3–9 | 4–6 | 7–5 | 10–2 | 7–3 | 6–4 | 2–10 | 2–8 | 2–7 | 8–5 | 4–6 | — | 9–9 |

== Season summary ==
=== David Cone's perfect game ===
- July 18, 1999 – The Yankees won 6–0 in interleague play against the Montreal Expos, which was also pitcher David Cone's perfect game. The perfect game was the last shutout he would throw in his career.

==== Line score ====
July 18, Yankee Stadium, New York

| Team | 1 | 2 | 3 | 4 | 5 | 6 | 7 | 8 | 9 | R | H | E |
|---|---|---|---|---|---|---|---|---|---|---|---|---|
| Montreal | 0 | 0 | 0 | 0 | 0 | 0 | 0 | 0 | 0 | 0 | 0 | 0 |
| New York | 0 | 5 | 0 | 0 | 0 | 0 | 0 | 1 | x | 6 | 8 | 0 |
WP: David Cone LP: Javier Vázquez; Home runs: Away: None; NYY: Ledee (3), Jeter (16); Attendance: 41,930; Umpires: HP: Ted Barrett, 1B: Larry McCoy, 2B: Jim Evans, 3B: Chuck Meriwether; Notes: Duration: 2:16

==== Box score ====
===== Batting =====
| Montreal Expos | AB | R | H | RBI | New York Yankees | AB | R | H | RBI |
|---|---|---|---|---|---|---|---|---|---|
| Wilton Guerrero, dh | 3 | 0 | 0 | 0 | Chuck Knoblauch, 2b | 2 | 1 | 1 | 0 |
| Terry Jones, cf | 2 | 0 | 0 | 0 | Derek Jeter, ss | 4 | 1 | 1 | 2 |
| James Mouton, cf | 1 | 0 | 0 | 0 | Paul O'Neill | 4 | 1 | 1 | 0 |
| Rondell White, lf | 3 | 0 | 0 | 0 | Bernie Williams, cf | 4 | 0 | 1 | 1 |
| Vladimir Guerrero, rf | 3 | 0 | 0 | 0 | Tino Martinez, 1b | 4 | 0 | 1 | 0 |
| Jose Vidro, 2b | 3 | 0 | 0 | 0 | Chili Davis, dh | 3 | 1 | 1 | 0 |
| Brad Fullmer, 1b | 3 | 0 | 0 | 0 | Ricky Ledée, lf | 4 | 1 | 1 | 2 |
| Chris Widger, c | 3 | 0 | 0 | 0 | Scott Brosius, 3b | 2 | 1 | 0 | 0 |
| Shane Andrews, 3b | 2 | 0 | 0 | 0 | Joe Girardi, c | 3 | 0 | 1 | 1 |
| Ryan McGuire, ph | 1 | 0 | 0 | 0 | David Cone, p | 0 | 0 | 0 | 0 |
| Orlando Cabrera, ss | 3 | 0 | 0 | 0 | NONE | 0 | 0 | 0 | 0 |
| Javier Vázquez, p | 0 | 0 | 0 | 0 | NONE | 0 | 0 | 0 | 0 |
| Bobby Ayala, p | 0 | 0 | 0 | 0 | NONE | 0 | 0 | 0 | 0 |
| Totals | 27 | 0 | 0 | 0 | Totals | 30 | 6 | 8 | 6 |

===== Pitching =====
| Montreal Expos | IP | H | R | ER | BB | SO | New York Yankees | IP | H | R | ER | BB | SO |
|---|---|---|---|---|---|---|---|---|---|---|---|---|---|
| Javier Vázquez | 7.0 | 7 | 6 | 6 | 2 | 3 | David Cone | 9.0 | 0 | 0 | 0 | 0 | 10 |
| Bobby Ayala | 1.0 | 1 | 0 | 0 | 0 | 0 | NONE | 0 | 0 | 0 | 0 | 0 | 0 |
| Totals | 8.0 | 8 | 6 | 6 | 2 | 3 | Totals | 9.0 | 0 | 0 | 0 | 0 | 10 |

=== Record vs. opponents ===
1999 American League record Source: MLB Standings Grid – 1999
| Team | ANA | BAL | BOS | CWS | CLE | DET | KC | MIN | NYY | OAK | SEA | TB | TEX | TOR | NL |
|---|---|---|---|---|---|---|---|---|---|---|---|---|---|---|---|
| Anaheim | — | 3–9 | 1–9 | 5–5 | 1–9 | 5–5 | 7–5 | 6–4 | 6–4 | 8–4 | 6–6 | 7–5 | 6–6 | 3–9 | 6–12 |
| Baltimore | 9–3 | — | 5–7 | 7–3 | 1–9 | 5–5 | 6–4 | 8–1 | 4–9 | 5–7 | 5–5 | 5–7 | 6–6 | 1–11 | 11–7 |
| Boston | 9–1 | 7–5 | — | 7–5 | 8–4 | 7–5 | 8–2 | 6–4 | 8–4 | 4–6 | 7–3 | 4–9 | 4–5 | 9–3 | 6–12 |
| Chicago | 5–5 | 3–7 | 5–7 | — | 3–9 | 7–5 | 6–6 | 8–3–1 | 5–7 | 3–7 | 4–8 | 6–4 | 5–5 | 6–4 | 9–9 |
| Cleveland | 9–1 | 9–1 | 4–8 | 9–3 | — | 8–5 | 7–5 | 9–3 | 3–7 | 10–2 | 7–3 | 5–4 | 3–7 | 5–7 | 9–9 |
| Detroit | 5–5 | 5–5 | 5–7 | 5–7 | 5–8 | — | 7–4 | 6–6 | 5–7 | 4–6 | 3–7 | 4–5 | 5–5 | 2–10 | 8–10 |
| Kansas City | 5–7 | 4–6 | 2–8 | 6–6 | 5–7 | 4–7 | — | 5–8 | 5–4 | 6–6 | 7–5 | 2–8 | 4–6 | 3–7 | 6–12 |
| Minnesota | 4–6 | 1–8 | 4–6 | 3–8–1 | 3–9 | 6–6 | 8–5 | — | 4–6 | 7–5 | 4–8 | 5–5 | 0–12 | 4–6 | 10–7 |
| New York | 4–6 | 9–4 | 4–8 | 7–5 | 7–3 | 7–5 | 4–5 | 6–4 | — | 6–4 | 9–1 | 8–4 | 8–4 | 10–2 | 9–9 |
| Oakland | 4–8 | 7–5 | 6–4 | 7–3 | 2–10 | 6–4 | 6–6 | 5–7 | 4–6 | — | 6–6 | 9–1 | 5–7 | 8–2 | 12–6 |
| Seattle | 6–6 | 5–5 | 3–7 | 8–4 | 3–7 | 7–3 | 5–7 | 8–4 | 1–9 | 6–6 | — | 8–4 | 5–8 | 7–2 | 7–11 |
| Tampa Bay | 5–7 | 7–5 | 9–4 | 4–6 | 4–5 | 5–4 | 8–2 | 5–5 | 4–8 | 1–9 | 4–8 | — | 4–8 | 5–8 | 4–14 |
| Texas | 6–6 | 6–6 | 5–4 | 5–5 | 7–3 | 5–5 | 6–4 | 12–0 | 4–8 | 7–5 | 8–5 | 8–4 | — | 6–4 | 10–8 |
| Toronto | 9–3 | 11–1 | 3–9 | 4–6 | 7–5 | 10–2 | 7–3 | 6–4 | 2–10 | 2–8 | 2–7 | 8–5 | 4–6 | — | 9–9 |

=== Roster ===
1999 New York Yankees
Roster
| Pitchers: 41 Mike Buddie; 12,22 Roger Clemens; 36 David Cone; 54 Todd Erdos; 27 Tony Fossas; 38 Jason Grimsley; 26 Orlando Hernández; 14 Hideki Irabu; 57 Jeff Juden; 55 Ramiro Mendoza; 31 Dan Naulty; 43 Jeff Nelson; 46 Andy Pettitte; 42 Mariano Rivera; 29 Mike Stanton; 57 Jay Tessmer; 27 Allen Watson; 52 Ed Yarnall | Catchers: 13 Mike Figga; 25 Joe Girardi; 20 Jorge Posada; Infielders: 35 Clay Bellinger; 18 Scott Brosius; 2 Derek Jeter; 59 D'Angelo Jiménez; 11 Chuck Knoblauch; 13 Jim Leyritz; 13 Jeff Manto; 24 Tino Martinez; 19 Luis Sojo; 58 Alfonso Soriano | Outfielders: 28 Chad Curtis; 17 Ricky Ledée; 21 Paul O'Neill; 47 Shane Spencer; 22 Tony Tarasco; 51 Bernie Williams; Other batters: 45 Chili Davis; 39 Darryl Strawberry | Manager: 6 Joe Torre; Coaches: 53 José Cardenal (First Base); 48 Chris Chambliss (Hitting); 40 Tony Cloninger (Bullpen); 30 Willie Randolph (Third Base); 34 Mel Stottlemyre (Pitching); 50 Don Zimmer (Bench) |

== Game log ==
=== Regular season ===
Legend
| | Yankees win |
| | Yankees loss |
| | Yankees tie |
| | Postponement |
| | Clinched division |
| **Bold** | Yankees team member |

1999 regular season game log: 98–64 (Home: 48–33 Away: 50–31)
April: 14–7 (Home: 10–1 Away: 4–6)

| # | Date | Time (ET) | Opponent | Score | Win | Loss | Save | Time of Game | Attendance | Record | Box/ Streak |
|---|---|---|---|---|---|---|---|---|---|---|---|
| 1 | April 5 | @ Athletics | 3–5 (8) | Mathews (1–0) | **Stanton** (0–1) | | Network Associates Coliseum | 46,380 | 0–1 | | |
| 2 | April 6 | @ Athletics | 7–4 | **Hernandez** (1–0) | Candiotti (0–1) | **Rivera** (1) | Network Associates Coliseum | 15,579 | 1–1 | | |
| 3 | April 7 | @ Athletics | 4–0 | **Mendoza** (1–0) | Haynes (0–1) | | Network Associates Coliseum | 18,846 | 2–1 | | |
| 4 | April 9 | Tigers | 12–3 (7) | **Cone** (1–0) | Graterol (0–1) | | **Yankee Stadium** | 56,583 | 3–1 | | |
| 5 | April 10 | Tigers | 5–0 | **Clemens** (1–0) | Moehler (1–1) | | **Yankee Stadium** | 42,058 | 4–1 | | |
| 6 | April 11 | Tigers | 11–2 | **Hernandez** (2–0) | Thompson (0–2) | | **Yankee Stadium** | 32,398 | 5–1 | | |
| 7 | April 13 | Orioles | 6–3 | **Nelson** (1–0) | Rhodes (0–1) | | **Yankee Stadium** | 25,254 | 6–1 | | |
| 8 | April 14 | Orioles | 14–7 | **Cone** (2–0) | Erickson (0–2) | | **Yankee Stadium** | 26,898 | 7–1 | | |
| 9 | April 15 | Orioles | 7–9 | Rhodes (1–1) | **Rivera** (0–1) | Timlin (3) | **Yankee Stadium** | 30,958 | 7–2 | | |
| 10 | April 16 | @ Tigers | 1–8 | Thompson (1–2) | **Hernandez** (2–1) | | Tiger Stadium | 14,816 | 7–3 | | |
| 11 | April 17 | @ Tigers | 1–3 | Anderson (1–0) | **Nelson** (1–1) | Jones (1) | Tiger Stadium | 17,821 | 7–4 | | |
| 12 | April 18 | @ Tigers | 1–5 | Mlicki (1–1) | **Mendoza** (1–1) | | Tiger Stadium | 16,503 | 7–5 | | |
| 13 | April 20 | Rangers | 4–0 | **Cone** (3–0) | Burkett (0–2) | | **Yankee Stadium** | 24,514 | 8–5 | | |
| 14 | April 21 | Rangers | 4–2 | **Clemens** (2–0) | Helling (0–3) | **Rivera** (2) | **Yankee Stadium** | 23,984 | 9–5 | | |
| 15 | April 23 | Blue Jays | 6–4 | **Hernandez** (3–1) | Wells (3–1) | **Rivera** (3) | **Yankee Stadium** | 36,529 | 10–5 | | |
| 16 | April 24 | Blue Jays | 7–4 | **Mendoza** (2–1) | Plesac (0–1) | **Rivera** (4) | **Yankee Stadium** | 46,924 | 11–5 | | |
| 17 | April 25 | Blue Jays | 4–3 (11) | **Grimsley** (1–0) | Person (0–1) | | **Yankee Stadium** | 51,903 | 12–5 | | |
| 18 | April 27 | @ Rangers | 7–6 | **Stanton** (1–1) | Wetteland (0–1) | **Rivera** (5) | The Ballpark in Arlington | 42,690 | 13–5 | | |
| 19 | April 28 | @ Rangers | 6–8 | Munoz (1–0) | **Stanton** (1–2) | Wetteland (7) | The Ballpark in Arlington | 33,038 | 13–6 | | |
| 20 | April 29 | @ Rangers | 5–3 | **Mendoza** (3–1) | Morgan (4–1) | **Rivera** (6) | The Ballpark in Arlington | 35,573 | 14–6 | | |
| 21 | April 30 | @ Royals | 6–13 | Morman (1–0) | **Pettitte** (0–1) | | Kauffman Stadium | 29,054 | 14–7 | | |

May: 15–13 (Home: 5–7 Away: 10–6)

| # | Date | Time (ET) | Opponent | Score | Win | Loss | Save | Time of Game | Attendance | Record | Box/ Streak |
|---|---|---|---|---|---|---|---|---|---|---|---|
| 22 | May 1 | @ Royals | 8–4 | **Cone** (4–0) | Pittsley (1–1) | | Kauffman Stadium | 29,692 | 15–7 | | |
| 23 | May 2 | @ Royals | 9–8 | **Grimsley** (2–0) | Santiago (1–2) | **Rivera** (7) | Kauffman Stadium | 24,666 | 16–7 | | |
| 24 | May 3 | @ Royals | 3–9 | Service (1–0) | **Hernandez** (3–2) | | Kauffman Stadium | 18,021 | 16–8 | | |
| 25 | May 4 | @ Twins | 5–8 | Lincoln (1–4) | **Mendoza** (3–2) | Aguilera (5) | Hubert H. Humphrey Metrodome | 15,923 | 16–9 | | |
| 26 | May 5 | @ Twins | 5–3 | **Pettitte** (1–1) | Hawkins (1–5) | **Rivera** (8) | Hubert H. Humphrey Metrodome | 17,859 | 17–9 | | |
| 27 | May 6 | @ Twins | 4–3 (10) | **Grimsley** (3–0) | Aguilera (3–1) | **Rivera** (9) | Hubert H. Humphrey Metrodome | 16,465 | 18–9 | | |
| 28 | May 7 | Mariners | 10–1 | **Irabu** (1–0) | Suzuki (0–1) | | **Yankee Stadium** | 38,476 | 19–9 | | |
| 29 | May 8 | Mariners | 5–14 | Garcia (4–1) | **Hernandez** (3–3) | | **Yankee Stadium** | 41,786 | 19–10 | | |
| 30 | May 9 | Mariners | 6–1 | **Grimsley** (4–0) | Fassero (1–4) | | **Yankee Stadium** | 49,622 | 20–10 | | |
| 31 | May 11 | Angels | 7–9 | Petkovsek (3–1) | **Mendoza** (3–3) | Percival (6) | **Yankee Stadium** | 25,313 | 20–11 | | |
| 32 | May 12 | Angels | 0–1 | Finley (2–3) | **Cone** (4–1) | Percival (7) | **Yankee Stadium** | 23,540 | 20–12 | | |
| 33 | May 13 | Angels | 0–2 | Olivares (4–3) | **Irabu** (1–1) | Percival (8) | **Yankee Stadium** | 26,702 | 20–13 | | |
| 34 | May 14 | White Sox | 2–8 | Parque (5–2) | **Hernandez** (3–4) | Simas (1) | **Yankee Stadium** | 33,793 | 20–14 | | |
| 35 | May 15 | White Sox | 4–12 | Snyder (6–1) | **Mendoza** (3–4) | | **Yankee Stadium** | 45,824 | 20–15 | | |
| 36 | May 16 | White Sox | 2–1 | **Pettitte** (2–1) | Sirotka (1–5) | **Rivera** (10) | **Yankee Stadium** | 51,046 | 21–15 | | |
| 37 | May 18 | @ Red Sox | 3–6 | Martinez (8–1) | **Cone** (4–2) | Gordon (5) | Fenway Park | 33,620 | 21–16 | | |
| 38 | May 19 | @ Red Sox | 0–6 | Rose (1–0) | **Irabu** (1–2) | | Fenway Park | 32,091 | 21–17 | | |
| 39 | May 20 | @ Red Sox | 3–1 | **Hernandez** (4–4) | Portugal (3–2) | **Rivera** (11) | Fenway Park | 33,139 | 22–17 | | |
| 40 | May 22 (1) | @ White Sox | 10–2 | **Clemens** (3–0) | Snyder (6–2) | | Comiskey Park II | | 23–17 | | |
| 41 | May 22 (2) | @ White Sox | 1–2 | Sirotka (2–5) | **Pettitte** (2–2) | Simas (2) | Comiskey Park II | 35,310 | 23–18 | | |
| 42 | May 23 | @ White Sox | 8–7 (10) | **Rivera** (1–1) | Simas (0–1) | | Comiskey Park II | 22,845 | 24–18 | | |
| 43 | May 25 | Red Sox | 2–5 | Rose (2–0) | **Irabu** (1–3) | Gordon (8) | **Yankee Stadium** | 37,715 | 24–19 | | |
| 44 | May 26 | Red Sox | 8–3 | **Hernandez** (5–4) | Portugal (3–3) | **Rivera** (12) | **Yankee Stadium** | 45,800 | 25–19 | | |
| 45 | May 27 | Red Sox | 4–1 | **Clemens** (4–0) | Rapp (2–3) | **Rivera** (13) | **Yankee Stadium** | 27,631 | 26–19 | | |
| 46 | May 28 | @ Blue Jays | 10–6 | **Pettitte** (3–2) | Carpenter (3–5) | | SkyDome | 30,355 | 27–19 | | |
| 47 | May 29 | @ Blue Jays | 8–3 | **Cone** (5–2) | Hentgen (4–3) | | SkyDome | 40,175 | 28–19 | | |
| 48 | May 30 | @ Blue Jays | 8–3 | **Irabu** (2–3) | Wells (5–5) | | SkyDome | 39,111 | 29–19 | | |
| 49 | May 31 | Indians | 1–7 | Nagy (6–3) | **Hernandez** (5–5) | | **Yankee Stadium** | 46,605 | 29–20 | | |

June: 17–9 (Home: 8–6 Away: 9–3)

| # | Date | Time (ET) | Opponent | Score | Win | Loss | Save | Time of Game | Attendance | Record | Box/ Streak |
|---|---|---|---|---|---|---|---|---|---|---|---|
| 50 | June 1 | Indians | 11–5 | **Clemens** (5–0) | Burba (5–2) | | **Yankee Stadium** | 32,759 | 30–20 | | |
| 51 | June 2 | Indians | 7–10 | Karsay (5–1) | **Pettitte** (3–3) | Jackson (11) | **Yankee Stadium** | 36,955 | 30–21 | | |
| 52 | June 4 | 7:40 p.m. EDT | Mets | **W** 4–3 | **Grimsley** (5–0) | Reed (3–3) | **Rivera** (14) | 3:09 | 56,175 | 31–21 | W1 |
| 53 | June 5 | 1:23 p.m. EDT | Mets | **W** 6–3 | **Hernandez** (6–5) | Yoshii (5–5) | **Rivera** (15) | 3:08 | 55,935 | 32–21 | W2 |
| 54 | June 6 | 8:11 p.m. EDT | Mets | L 2–7 | Leiter (3–5) | **Clemens** (5–1) | — | 3:11 | 56,294 | 32–22 | L1 |
| 55 | June 7 | @ Phillies | 5–6 | Byrd (8–3) | **Pettitte** (3–4) | | Veterans Stadium | 37,180 | 32–23 | | |
| 56 | June 8 | @ Phillies | 5–11 | Perez (3–1) | **Grimsley** (5–1) | | Veterans Stadium | 44,444 | 32–24 | | |
| 57 | June 9 | @ Phillies | 11–5 | **Cone** (6–2) | Ogea (3–4) | | Veterans Stadium | 42,047 | 33–24 | | |
| 58 | June 11 | @ Marlins | 8–4 | **Hernandez** (7–5) | Meadows (5–6) | **Rivera** (16) | Pro Player Stadium | 40,161 | 34–24 | | |
| 59 | June 12 | @ Marlins | 5–4 | **Clemens** (6–1) | Hernandez (3–6) | **Rivera** (17) | Pro Player Stadium | 42,110 | 35–24 | | |
| 60 | June 13 | @ Marlins | 2–8 | Fernandez (2–3) | **Pettitte** (3–5) | | Pro Player Stadium | 39,639 | 35–25 | | |
| 61 | June 14 | Rangers | 8–2 | **Irabu** (3–3) | Clark (3–6) | | **Yankee Stadium** | 27,812 | 36–25 | | |
| 62 | June 15 | Rangers | 6–2 | **Cone** (7–2) | Glynn (0–1) | | **Yankee Stadium** | 28,200 | 37–25 | | |
| 63 | June 16 | Rangers | 0–3 | Helling (6–6) | **Hernandez** (7–6) | Wetteland (22) | **Yankee Stadium** | 28,555 | 37–26 | | |
| 64 | June 17 | Rangers | 2–4 | Sele (7–5) | **Clemens** (6–2) | Wetteland (23) | **Yankee Stadium** | 30,157 | 37–27 | | |
| 65 | June 18 | Angels | 4–1 | **Pettitte** (4–5) | Finley (4–7) | **Rivera** (18) | **Yankee Stadium** | 39,996 | 38–27 | | |
| 66 | June 19 | Angels | 6–2 | **Irabu** (4–3) | Olivares (6–5) | **Mendoza** (1) | **Yankee Stadium** | 49,408 | 39–27 | | |
| 67 | June 20 | Angels | 2–4 | Belcher (5–6) | **Cone** (7–3) | Percival (19) | **Yankee Stadium** | 55,626 | 39–28 | | |
| 68 | June 22 | @ Devil Rays | 7–0 | **Hernandez** (8–6) | Witt (3–4) | | Tropicana Field | 30,290 | 40–28 | | |
| 69 | June 23 | @ Devil Rays | 12–4 | **Clemens** (7–2) | Eiland (0–3) | | Tropicana Field | 30,474 | 41–28 | | |
| 70 | June 24 | @ Devil Rays | 7–3 | **Pettitte** (5–5) | Rekar (5–3) | **Mendoza** (2) | Tropicana Field | 30,499 | 42–28 | | |
| 71 | June 25 | @ Orioles | 9–8 | **Naulty** (1–0) | Timlin (3–6) | **Rivera** (19) | Oriole Park at Camden Yards | 47,936 | 43–28 | | |
| 72 | June 26 | @ Orioles | 7–4 | **Cone** (8–3) | Johnson (1–2) | **Rivera** (20) | Oriole Park at Camden Yards | 47,841 | 44–28 | | |
| 73 | June 27 | @ Orioles | 6–2 | **Hernandez** (9–6) | Ponson (7–5) | | Oriole Park at Camden Yards | 48,020 | 45–28 | | |
| 74 | June 29 | Tigers | 3–0 | **Clemens** (8–2) | Thompson (6–8) | | **Yankee Stadium** | 31,338 | 46–28 | | |
| 75 | June 30 | Tigers | 2–8 | Moehler (7–8) | **Pettitte** (5–6) | | **Yankee Stadium** | 39,749 | 46–29 | | |

July: 16–11 (Home: 11–5 Away: 5–6)

| # | Date | Time (ET) | Opponent | Score | Win | Loss | Save | Time of Game | Attendance | Record | Box/ Streak |
|---|---|---|---|---|---|---|---|---|---|---|---|
| 76 | July 1 | Tigers | 6–0 | **Irabu** (5–3) | Mlicki (3–9) | | **Yankee Stadium** | 26,311 | 47–29 | | |
| 77 | July 2 | Orioles | 2–1 | **Cone** (9–3) | Johnson (1–3) | **Rivera** (21) | **Yankee Stadium** | 37,518 | 48–29 | | |
| 78 | July 3 | Orioles | 6–5 | **Grimsley** (6–1) | Rhodes (3–4) | | **Yankee Stadium** | 42,859 | 49–29 | | |
| 79 | July 4 | Orioles | 3–7 | Guzman (4–6) | **Mendoza** (3–5) | Kamieniecki (2) | **Yankee Stadium** | 37,046 | 49–30 | | |
| 80 | July 5 | Orioles | 1–9 | Mussina (10–4) | **Pettitte** (5–7) | | **Yankee Stadium** | 29,934 | 49–31 | | |
| 81 | July 6 | @ Tigers | 9–8 (10) | **Rivera** (2–1) | Jones (1–3) | **Mendoza** (3) | Tiger Stadium | 23,785 | 50–31 | | |
| 82 | July 7 | @ Tigers | 4–6 | Mlicki (4–9) | **Cone** (9–4) | Brocail (2) | Tiger Stadium | 28,844 | 50–32 | | |
| 83 | July 8 | @ Tigers | 3–2 | **Hernandez** (10–6) | Nitkowski (1–3) | **Rivera** (22) | Tiger Stadium | 34,417 | 51–32 | | |
| 84 | July 9 | 7:40 p.m. EDT | @ Mets | L 2–5 | Leiter (8–6) | **Clemens** (8–3) | Benítez (6) | 3:02 | 53,820 | 51–33 | L1 |
| 85 | July 10 | 1:15 p.m. EDT | @ Mets | L 8–9 | Mahomes (3–0) | **Rivera** (2–2) | — | 3:47 | 53,792 | 51–34 | L2 |
| 86 | July 11 | 1:40 p.m. EDT | @ Mets | **W** 6–3 | **Irabu** (6–3) | Hershiser (9–6) | **Rivera** (23) | 3:21 | 53,869 | 52–34 | W1 |
| — | July 13 | 8:50 p.m. EDT | **70th All-Star Game in Boston, Massachusetts** | | | | | | | | |
| 87 | July 15 | 7:35 p.m. EDT | Braves | L 2–6 | Glavine (8–8) | **Clemens** (8–4) | — | 3:14 | 49,087 | 52–35 | L1 |
| 88 | July 16 | 7:35 p.m. EDT | Braves | L 7–10 | Springer (1–1) | **Rivera** (2–3) | Rocker (18) | 3:04 | 50,469 | 52–36 | L2 |
| 89 | July 17 | 1:05 p.m. EDT | Braves | **W** 11–4 | **Pettitte** (6–7) | Pérez (4–6) | **Grimsley** (1) | 3:15 | 55,785 | 53–36 | W1 |
| 90 | July 18 | Expos | 6–0 | **Cone** (10–4) | Vazquez (2–5) | | **Yankee Stadium** | 41,930 | 54–36 | | |
| 91 | July 19 | Expos | 4–6 | Kline (4–2) | **Mendoza** (3–6) | Urbina (20) | **Yankee Stadium** | 23,404 | 54–37 | | |
| 92 | July 20 | Expos | 7–4 | **Clemens** (9–4) | Thurman (3–7) | **Rivera** (24) | **Yankee Stadium** | 28,801 | 55–37 | | |
| 93 | July 21 | Devil Rays | 4–3 | **Hernandez** (11–6) | Witt (5–6) | **Rivera** (25) | **Yankee Stadium** | 27,566 | 56–37 | | |
| 94 | July 22 | Devil Rays | 5–4 | **Pettitte** (7–7) | Rekar (6–6) | **Rivera** (26) | **Yankee Stadium** | 40,557 | 57–37 | | |
| 95 | July 23 | Indians | 9–8 (10) | **Grimsley** (7–1) | Jackson (3–4) | | **Yankee Stadium** | 52,704 | 58–37 | | |
| 96 | July 24 | Indians | 21–1 | **Irabu** (7–3) | Langston (1–1) | | **Yankee Stadium** | 54,870 | 59–37 | | |
| 97 | July 25 | Indians | 2–1 | **Mendoza** (4–6) | Rincon (0–2) | | **Yankee Stadium** | 54,944 | 60–37 | | |
| 98 | July 27 | @ White Sox | 5–3 | **Hernandez** (12–6) | Baldwin (4–11) | **Rivera** (27) | Comiskey Park II | 21,364 | 61–37 | | |
| 99 | July 28 | @ White Sox | 3–11 | Castillo (1–0) | **Pettitte** (7–8) | | Comiskey Park II | 22,523 | 61–38 | | |
| 100 | July 29 | @ White Sox | 1–5 | Snyder (8–6) | **Cone** (10–5) | Foulke (5) | Comiskey Park II | 24,056 | 61–39 | | |
| 101 | July 30 | @ Red Sox | 13–3 | **Irabu** (8–3) | Portugal (6–8) | | Fenway Park | 33,777 | 62–39 | | |
| 102 | July 31 | @ Red Sox | 5–6 | Lowe (2–2) | **Mendoza** (4–7) | | Fenway Park | 33,179 | 62–40 | | |

August: 19–10 (Home: 9–6 Away: 10–4)

| # | Date | Time (ET) | Opponent | Score | Win | Loss | Save | Time of Game | Attendance | Record | Box/ Streak |
|---|---|---|---|---|---|---|---|---|---|---|---|
| 103 | August 1 | @ Red Sox | 4–5 | Saberhagen (7–4) | **Hernandez** (12–7) | Wakefield (14) | Fenway Park | 33,553 | 62–41 | | |
| 104 | August 2 | Blue Jays | 3–1 | **Pettitte** (8–8) | Wells (11–7) | **Rivera** (28) | **Yankee Stadium** | 40,825 | 63–41 | | |
| 105 | August 3 | Blue Jays | 1–3 | Hamilton (4–6) | **Cone** (10–6) | Koch (22) | **Yankee Stadium** | 43,110 | 63–42 | | |
| 106 | August 4 | Blue Jays | 8–3 | **Irabu** (9–3) | Escobar (9–8) | | **Yankee Stadium** | 52,833 | 64–42 | | |
| 107 | August 5 | @ Mariners | 7–4 | **Clemens** (10–4) | Moyer (10–6) | **Rivera** (29) | Safeco Field | 45,190 | 65–42 | | |
| 108 | August 6 | @ Mariners | 11–8 | **Watson** (3–3) | Fassero (4–13) | **Rivera** (30) | Safeco Field | 45,262 | 66–42 | | |
| 109 | August 7 | @ Mariners | 1–0 | **Pettitte** (9–8) | Garcia (11–7) | **Rivera** (31) | Safeco Field | 45,202 | 67–42 | | |
| 110 | August 8 | @ Mariners | 9–3 | **Cone** (11–6) | Halama (9–3) | | Safeco Field | 45,195 | 68–42 | | |
| 111 | August 9 | @ Athletics | 12–8 | **Mendoza** (5–7) | Haynes (7–11) | | Network Associates Coliseum | 24,896 | 69–42 | | |
| 112 | August 10 | @ Athletics | 1–6 | Olivares (10–9) | **Clemens** (10–5) | Jones (6) | Network Associates Coliseum | 32,474 | 69–43 | | |
| 113 | August 11 | @ Athletics | 5–3 | **Watson** (4–3) | Jones (3–4) | **Rivera** (32) | Network Associates Coliseum | 43,683 | 70–43 | | |
| 114 | August 13 | Twins | 14–2 | **Pettitte** (10–8) | Hawkins (8–9) | | **Yankee Stadium** | 44,568 | 71–43 | | |
| 115 | August 14 | Twins | 3–6 | Wells (7–1) | **Cone** (11–7) | Trombley (20) | **Yankee Stadium** | 55,179 | 71–44 | | |
| 116 | August 15 | Twins | 3–5 | Radke (9–11) | **Irabu** (9–4) | Trombley (21) | **Yankee Stadium** | 56,180 | 71–45 | | |
| 117 | August 16 | Twins | 2–0 | **Clemens** (11–5) | Milton (4–10) | **Rivera** (33) | **Yankee Stadium** | 36,503 | 72–45 | | |
| 118 | August 17 | Royals | 5–2 | **Hernandez** (13–7) | Rosado (7–10) | **Rivera** (34) | **Yankee Stadium** | 31,631 | 73–45 | | |
| 119 | August 18 | Royals | 0–3 | Reichert (2–1) | **Pettitte** (10–9) | Montgomery (6) | **Yankee Stadium** | 38,947 | 73–46 | | |
| 120 | August 19 | Royals | 1–4 (10) | Rigby (4–6) | **Grimsley** (7–2) | Montgomery (7) | **Yankee Stadium** | 42,325 | 73–47 | | |
| 121 | August 20 | @ Twins | 9–3 | **Irabu** (10–4) | Radke (9–12) | **Nelson** (1) | Hubert H. Humphrey Metrodome | 23,595 | 74–47 | | |
| 122 | August 21 | @ Twins | 1–6 | Milton (5–10) | **Clemens** (11–6) | Guardado (2) | Hubert H. Humphrey Metrodome | 32,170 | 74–48 | | |
| 123 | August 22 | @ Twins | 5–3 | **Hernandez** (14–7) | Mays (5–6) | **Rivera** (35) | Hubert H. Humphrey Metrodome | 26,150 | 75–48 | | |
| 124 | August 23 | @ Rangers | 21–3 | **Pettitte** (11–9) | Burkett (4–7) | | The Ballpark in Arlington | 38,024 | 76–48 | | |
| 125 | August 24 | @ Rangers | 10–7 (11) | **Mendoza** (6–7) | Lee (0–1) | **Rivera** (36) | The Ballpark in Arlington | 39,727 | 77–48 | | |
| 126 | August 25 | @ Rangers | 3–7 | Loaiza (7–1) | **Irabu** (10–5) | | The Ballpark in Arlington | 38,345 | 77–49 | | |
| 127 | August 27 | Mariners | 8–0 | **Clemens** (12–6) | Meche (4–4) | | **Yankee Stadium** | 51,985 | 78–49 | | |
| 128 | August 28 | Mariners | 2–1 | **Rivera** (3–3) | Paniagua (6–10) | | **Yankee Stadium** | 54,787 | 79–49 | | |
| 129 | August 29 | Mariners | 11–5 | **Pettitte** (12–9) | Abbott (5–1) | **Rivera** (37) | **Yankee Stadium** | 52,493 | 80–49 | | |
| 130 | August 30 | Athletics | 7–4 | **Nelson** (2–1) | Mathews (8–4) | **Rivera** (38) | **Yankee Stadium** | 32,712 | 81–49 | | |
| 131 | August 31 | Athletics | 2–3 (11) | Jones (5–5) | **Mendoza** (6–8) | Isringhausen (3) | **Yankee Stadium** | 33,746 | 81–50 | | |

September: 15–13 (Home: 5–7 Away: 10–6)

| # | Date | Time (ET) | Opponent | Score | Win | Loss | Save | Time of Game | Attendance | Record | Box/ Streak |
|---|---|---|---|---|---|---|---|---|---|---|---|
| 132 | September 1 | Athletics | 1–7 | Olivares (13–9) | **Clemens** (12–7) | | **Yankee Stadium** | 34,468 | 81–51 | | |
| 133 | September 2 | Athletics | 9–3 | **Hernandez** (15–7) | Heredia (11–6) | | **Yankee Stadium** | 33,147 | 82–51 | | |
| 134 | September 3 | @ Angels | 2–8 | Belcher (6–8) | **Pettitte** (12–10) | | Edison Field | 35,782 | 82–52 | | |
| 135 | September 4 | @ Angels | 9–6 | **Watson** (5–3) | Alvarez (0–1) | **Rivera** (39) | Edison Field | 30,589 | 83–52 | | |
| 136 | September 5 | @ Angels | 8–3 | **Yarnall** (1–0) | Fyhrie (0–4) | | Edison Field | 35,481 | 84–52 | | |
| 137 | September 6 | @ Angels | 3–5 | Washburn (1–3) | **Clemens** (12–8) | Percival (27) | Edison Field | 31,749 | 84–53 | | |
| 138 | September 7 | @ Royals | 3–6 | Rosado (8–13) | **Cone** (11–8) | Montgomery (9) | Kauffman Stadium | 14,207 | 84–54 | | |
| 139 | September 8 | @ Royals | 9–5 | **Hernandez** (16–7) | Rusch (0–1) | **Rivera** (40) | Kauffman Stadium | 15,247 | 85–54 | | |
| 140 | September 10 | Red Sox | 1–3 | Martinez (21–4) | **Pettitte** (12–11) | | **Yankee Stadium** | 55,239 | 85–55 | | |
| 141 | September 11 | Red Sox | 10–11 | Garces (5–1) | **Irabu** (10–6) | Beck (9) | **Yankee Stadium** | 55,422 | 85–56 | | |
| 142 | September 12 | Red Sox | 1–4 | Cormier (2–0) | **Clemens** (12–9) | Beck (10) | **Yankee Stadium** | 56,028 | 85–57 | | |
| 143 | September 13 | @ Blue Jays | 1–2 | Wells (14–10) | **Hernandez** (16–8) | | SkyDome | 30,118 | 85–58 | | |
| 144 | September 14 | @ Blue Jays | 10–6 | **Mendoza** (7–8) | Koch (0–4) | | SkyDome | 29,140 | 86–58 | | |
| 145 | September 15 | @ Blue Jays | 6–4 | **Pettitte** (13–11) | Hentgen (10–11) | **Rivera** (41) | SkyDome | 29,460 | 87–58 | | |
| 146 | September 16 | @ Indians | 9–5 | **Irabu** (11–6) | Burba (14–8) | | Jacobs Field | 43,054 | 88–58 | | |
| 147 | September 17 | @ Indians | 9–4 | **Clemens** (13–9) | Wright (7–9) | | Jacobs Field | 43,029 | 89–58 | | |
| 148 | September 18 | @ Indians | 4–5 | Nagy (17–9) | **Hernandez** (16–9) | Jackson (37) | Jacobs Field | 43,002 | 89–59 | | |
| 149 | September 19 | @ Indians | 11–7 | **Watson** (6–3) | Martin (0–1) | | Jacobs Field | 42,969 | 90–59 | | |
| 150 | September 21 | White Sox | 3–1 | **Pettitte** (14–11) | Baldwin (10–13) | **Rivera** (42) | **Yankee Stadium** | 29,248 | 91–59 | | |
| 151 | September 22 | White Sox | 5–4 | **Rivera** (4–3) | Navarro (8–13) | | **Yankee Stadium** | 27,549 | 92–59 | | |
| 152 | September 23 | White Sox | 5–2 | **Clemens** (14–9) | Parque (9–14) | **Rivera** (43) | **Yankee Stadium** | 33,586 | 93–59 | | |
| 153 | September 24 | Devil Rays | 4–3 (11) | **Stanton** (2–2) | Charlton (2–3) | | **Yankee Stadium** | 44,932 | 94–59 | | |
| 154 | September 25 | Devil Rays | 1–2 | Arrojo (7–11) | **Cone** (11–9) | Hernandez (41) | **Yankee Stadium** | 50,403 | 94–60 | | |
| 155 | September 26 | Devil Rays | 5–6 | Lidle (1–0) | **Mendoza** (7–9) | Hernandez (42) | **Yankee Stadium** | 49,458 | 94–61 | | |
| 156 | September 27 | Devil Rays | 6–10 | Duvall (1–1) | **Irabu** (11–7) | Sparks (1) | **Yankee Stadium** | 41,355 | 94–62 | | |
| 157 | September 28 | @ Orioles | 9–5 | **Mendoza** (8–9) | Ponson (12–12) | | Oriole Park at Camden Yards | 44,711 | 95–62 | | |
| 158 | September 30 (1) | @ Orioles | 0–5 | Mussina (18–7) | **Clemens** (14–10) | | Oriole Park at Camden Yards | 44,568 | 95–63 | | |
| 159 | September 30 (2) | @ Orioles | 12–5 | **Hernandez** (17–9) | Corsi (1–3) | | Oriole Park at Camden Yards | 47,446 | 96–63 | | |

October: 2–1 (Home: 0–0 Away: 2–1)

| # | Date | Time (ET) | Opponent | Score | Win | Loss | Save | Time of Game | Attendance | Record | Box/ Streak |
|---|---|---|---|---|---|---|---|---|---|---|---|
| 160 | October 1 | @ Devil Rays | 11–7 | **Mendoza** (9–9) | Arrojo (7–12) | **Rivera** (44) | Tropicana Field | 27,248 | 97–63 | | |
| 161 | October 2 | @ Devil Rays | 3–2 | **Cone** (12–9) | Alvarez (9–9) | **Rivera** (45) | Tropicana Field | 40,756 | 98–63 | | |
| 162 | October 3 | @ Devil Rays | 2–6 | Gaillard (1–0) | **Juden** (0–1) | Hernandez (43) | Tropicana Field | 31,292 | 98–64 | | |

=== Detailed records ===
American League
| Opponent | W | L | WP | RS | RA |
AL East
| Baltimore Orioles | 9 | 4 | 0.692 | 82 | 70 |
| Boston Red Sox | 4 | 8 | 0.333 | 54 | 54 |
| **New York Yankees** | | | | | |
| Tampa Bay Devil Rays | 8 | 4 | 0.667 | 67 | 50 |
| Toronto Blue Jays | 10 | 2 | 0.833 | 72 | 42 |
| Div Total | 31 | 18 | 0.633 | 275 | 216 |
AL Central
| Chicago White Sox | 7 | 5 | 0.583 | 49 | 58 |
| Cleveland Indians | 7 | 3 | 0.700 | 84 | 53 |
| Detroit Tigers | 7 | 5 | 0.583 | 58 | 45 |
| Kansas City Royals | 4 | 5 | 0.444 | 44 | 54 |
| Minnesota Twins | 6 | 4 | 0.600 | 51 | 39 |
| Div Total | 31 | 22 | 0.585 | 286 | 249 |
AL West
| Anaheim Angels | 4 | 6 | 0.400 | 41 | 41 |
| Oakland Athletics | 6 | 4 | 0.600 | 51 | 43 |
| Seattle Mariners | 9 | 1 | 0.900 | 70 | 37 |
| Texas Rangers | 8 | 4 | 0.667 | 76 | 47 |
| Div Total | 27 | 15 | 0.643 | 238 | 168 |
| League Total | 89 | 55 | 0.618 | 799 | 633 |
National League
| Atlanta Braves | 1 | 2 | 0.333 | 20 | 20 |
| Florida Marlins | 2 | 1 | 0.667 | 15 | 16 |
| Montreal Expos | 2 | 1 | 0.667 | 17 | 10 |
| New York Mets | 3 | 3 | 0.500 | 28 | 30 |
| Philadelphia Phillies | 1 | 2 | 0.333 | 21 | 22 |
| League Total | 9 | 9 | 0.500 | 101 | 98 |
| Season Total | 98 | 64 | 0.605 | 900 | 731 |

| Month | Games | Won | Lost | Win % | RS | RA |
|---|---|---|---|---|---|---|
| April | 21 | 14 | 7 | 0.667 | 121 | 92 |
| May | 28 | 15 | 13 | 0.536 | 136 | 136 |
| June | 26 | 17 | 9 | 0.654 | 147 | 113 |
| July | 27 | 16 | 11 | 0.593 | 155 | 130 |
| August | 29 | 19 | 10 | 0.655 | 169 | 108 |
| September | 28 | 15 | 13 | 0.536 | 156 | 137 |
| October | 3 | 2 | 1 | 0.667 | 16 | 15 |
| Total | 162 | 98 | 64 | 0.605 | 900 | 731 |

| | Games | Won | Lost | Win % | RS | RA |
| Home | 81 | 48 | 33 | 0.593 | 411 | 323 |
| Away | 81 | 50 | 31 | 0.617 | 489 | 408 |
| Total | 162 | 98 | 64 | 0.605 | 900 | 731 |

=== Postseason Game log ===
Legend
| | Yankees win |
| | Yankees loss |
| **Bold** | Yankees team member |

1999 Postseason game log: 11–1 (Home: 6–0; Away: 5–1)
AL Division Series vs. Texas Rangers 3–0 (Home: 2–0; Away: 1–0)

| # | Date | Time (ET) | Opponent | Score | Win | Loss | Save | Time of Game | Attendance | Series | Box/ Streak |
|---|---|---|---|---|---|---|---|---|---|---|---|
| 1 | October 5 | Rangers | 8–0 | **Hernandez** (1–0) | Sele (0–1) | | Yankee Stadium | 57,099 | 1–0 | | |
| 2 | October 7 | Rangers | 3–1 | **Pettitte** (1–0) | Helling (0–1) | **Rivera** (1) | Yankee Stadium | 57,485 | 2–0 | | |
| 3 | October 9 | @ Rangers | 3–0 | **Clemens** (1–0) | Loaiza (0–1) | **Rivera** (2) | The Ballpark in Arlington | 50,269 | 3–0 | | |

AL Championship Series vs. Boston Red Sox 4–1 (Home: 2–0; Away: 2–1)

| # | Date | Time (ET) | Opponent | Score | Win | Loss | Save | Time of Game | Attendance | Series | Box/ Streak |
|---|---|---|---|---|---|---|---|---|---|---|---|
| 1 | October 13 | Red Sox | 4–3 | **Rivera** (1–0) | Beck (0–1) | | Yankee Stadium | 57,181 | 1–0 | | |
| 2 | October 14 | Red Sox | 3–2 | **Cone** (1–0) | Martinez (0–1) | **Rivera** (3) | Yankee Stadium | 57,180 | 2–0 | | |
| 3 | October 16 | @ Red Sox | 1–13 | Martinez (2–0) | **Clemens** (1–1) | | Fenway Park | 33,190 | 2–1 | | |
| 4 | October 17 | @ Red Sox | 9–2 | **Pettitte** (2–0) | Saberhagen (0–2) | **Rivera** (4) | Fenway Park | 33,586 | 3–1 | | |
| 5 | October 18 | @ Red Sox | 6–1 | **Hernandez** (2–0) | Mercker (0–1) | **Mendoza** (1) | Fenway Park | 33,589 | 4–1 | | |

World Series vs. Atlanta Braves 4–0 (Home: 2–0; Away: 2–0)

| # | Date | Time (ET) | Opponent | Score | Win | Loss | Save | Time of Game | Attendance | Series | Box/ Streak |
|---|---|---|---|---|---|---|---|---|---|---|---|
| 1 | October 23 | 8:05 p.m. EDT | @ Braves | **W** 4–1 | **Hernández** (1–0) | Maddux (0–1) | **Rivera** (1) | 2:57 | 51,342 | NYA 1–0 | W1 |
| 2 | October 24 | 8:05 p.m. EDT | @ Braves | **W** 7–2 | **Cone** (1–0) | Millwood (0–1) | — | 3:14 | 51,226 | NYA 2–0 | W2 |
| 3 | October 26 | 8:20 p.m. EDT | Braves | **W** 6–5 (10) | **Rivera** (1–0) | Remlinger (0–1) | — | 3:16 | 56,794 | NYA 3–0 | W3 |
| 4 | October 27 | 8:20 p.m. EDT | Braves | **W** 4–1 | **Clemens** (1–0) | Smoltz (0–1) | **Rivera** (2) | 2:58 | 56,752 | NYA 4–0 | W4 |

== Player stats ==
=== Batting ===
==== Starters by position ====
Note: Pos = Position; G = Games played; AB = At bats; H = Hits; Avg. = Batting average; HR = Home runs; RBI = Runs batted in

| Pos | Player | G | AB | H | Avg. | HR | RBI |
|---|---|---|---|---|---|---|---|
| C | Jorge Posada | 112 | 379 | 93 | .245 | 12 | 57 |
| 1B | Tino Martinez | 159 | 589 | 155 | .263 | 28 | 105 |
| 2B | Chuck Knoblauch | 150 | 603 | 176 | .292 | 18 | 68 |
| 3B | Scott Brosius | 133 | 473 | 117 | .247 | 18 | 71 |
| SS | Derek Jeter | 158 | 627 | 219 | .349 | 25 | 102 |
| LF | Ricky Ledée | 88 | 250 | 69 | .276 | 9 | 40 |
| CF | Bernie Williams | 158 | 591 | 202 | .342 | 25 | 115 |
| RF | Paul O'Neill | 153 | 597 | 170 | .285 | 19 | 110 |
| DH | Chili Davis | 146 | 476 | 128 | .269 | 19 | 78 |

==== Other batters ====
Note: G = Games played; AB = At bats; H = Hits; Avg. = Batting average; HR = Home runs; RBI = Runs batted in

| Player | G | AB | H | Avg. | HR | RBI |
|---|---|---|---|---|---|---|
| Joe Girardi | 65 | 209 | 50 | .239 | 2 | 27 |
| Shane Spencer | 71 | 205 | 48 | .234 | 8 | 20 |
| Chad Curtis | 96 | 195 | 51 | .262 | 5 | 24 |
| Luis Sojo | 49 | 127 | 32 | .252 | 2 | 16 |
| Jim Leyritz | 31 | 66 | 15 | .227 | 0 | 5 |
| Darryl Strawberry | 24 | 49 | 16 | .327 | 3 | 6 |
| Clay Bellinger | 32 | 45 | 9 | .200 | 1 | 2 |
| Tony Tarasco | 14 | 31 | 5 | .161 | 0 | 3 |
| D'Angelo Jiménez | 7 | 20 | 8 | .400 | 0 | 4 |
| Jeff Manto | 6 | 8 | 1 | .125 | 0 | 0 |
| Alfonso Soriano | 9 | 8 | 1 | .125 | 1 | 1 |
| Mike Figga | 2 | 0 | 0 | ---- | 0 | 0 |

=== Pitching ===
==== Starting pitchers ====
Note: G = Games pitched; IP = Innings pitched; W = Wins; L = Losses; ERA = Earned run average; SO = Strikeouts

| Player | G | IP | W | L | ERA | SO |
|---|---|---|---|---|---|---|
| Orlando Hernández | 33 | 214.1 | 17 | 9 | 4.12 | 157 |
| David Cone | 31 | 193.1 | 12 | 9 | 3.44 | 177 |
| Andy Pettitte | 31 | 191.2 | 14 | 11 | 4.70 | 121 |
| Roger Clemens | 30 | 187.2 | 14 | 10 | 4.60 | 163 |
| Hideki Irabu | 32 | 169.1 | 11 | 7 | 4.84 | 133 |

==== Other pitchers ====
Note: G = Games pitched; IP = Innings pitched; W = Wins; L = Losses; ERA = Earned run average; SO = Strikeouts

| Player | G | IP | W | L | ERA | SO |
|---|---|---|---|---|---|---|
| Ramiro Mendoza | 53 | 123.2 | 9 | 9 | 4.29 | 80 |
| Ed Yarnall | 5 | 17.0 | 1 | 0 | 3.71 | 13 |
| Jeff Juden | 2 | 5.2 | 0 | 1 | 1.59 | 9 |

==== Relief pitchers ====
Note: G = Games pitched; IP = Innings pitched; W = Wins; L = Losses; SV = Saves; ERA = Earned run average; SO = Strikeouts

| Player | G | IP | W | L | SV | ERA | SO |
|---|---|---|---|---|---|---|---|
| Mariano Rivera | 66 | 69.0 | 4 | 3 | 45 | 1.83 | 52 |
| Mike Stanton | 73 | 62.1 | 2 | 2 | 0 | 4.33 | 59 |
| Jason Grimsley | 55 | 75.0 | 7 | 2 | 1 | 3.60 | 49 |
| Jeff Nelson | 39 | 30.1 | 2 | 1 | 1 | 4.15 | 35 |
| Dan Naulty | 33 | 49.1 | 1 | 0 | 0 | 4.38 | 25 |
| Allen Watson | 21 | 34.1 | 4 | 0 | 0 | 2.10 | 30 |
| Jay Tessmer | 6 | 6.2 | 0 | 0 | 0 | 14.85 | 3 |
| Todd Erdos | 4 | 7.0 | 0 | 0 | 0 | 3.86 | 4 |
| Mike Buddie | 2 | 2.0 | 0 | 0 | 0 | 4.50 | 1 |
| Tony Fossas | 5 | 1.0 | 0 | 0 | 0 | 36.00 | 0 |

== ALDS ==
Series Summary:

- Game 1 @ Yankee Stadium: Yankees 8, Rangers 0
- Game 2 @ Yankee Stadium: Yankees 3, Rangers 1
- Game 3 @ The Ballpark in Arlington: Yankees 3, Rangers 0

== ALCS ==
New York wins the series, 4–1

| Game | Home | Score | Visitor | Score | Date | Series |
|---|---|---|---|---|---|---|
| 1 | New York | 4 | Boston | 3 | October 13 | 1-0 (NYY) |
| 2 | New York | 3 | Boston | 2 | October 14 | 2-0 (NYY) |
| 3 | Boston | 13 | New York | 1 | October 16 | 2-1 (NYY) |
| 4 | Boston | 2 | New York | 9 | October 17 | 3-1 (NYY) |
| 5 | Boston | 1 | New York | 6 | October 18 | 4-1 (NYY) |

== World Series ==
=== Game 1 ===
October 23, 1999, at Turner Field in Atlanta

| Team | 1 | 2 | 3 | 4 | 5 | 6 | 7 | 8 | 9 | R | H | E |
|---|---|---|---|---|---|---|---|---|---|---|---|---|
| New York | 0 | 0 | 0 | 0 | 0 | 0 | 0 | 4 | 0 | 4 | 6 | 0 |
| Atlanta | 0 | 0 | 0 | 1 | 0 | 0 | 0 | 0 | 0 | 1 | 2 | 2 |
WP: Orlando Hernández (1-0) LP: Greg Maddux (0-1) Sv: Mariano Rivera (1); Home runs: NYY: None; ATL: Chipper Jones (1)

=== Game 2 ===
October 24, 1999, at Turner Field in Atlanta

| Team | 1 | 2 | 3 | 4 | 5 | 6 | 7 | 8 | 9 | R | H | E |
|---|---|---|---|---|---|---|---|---|---|---|---|---|
| New York | 3 | 0 | 2 | 1 | 1 | 0 | 0 | 0 | 0 | 7 | 14 | 1 |
| Atlanta | 0 | 0 | 0 | 0 | 0 | 0 | 0 | 0 | 2 | 2 | 5 | 1 |
WP: David Cone (1-0) LP: Kevin Millwood (0-1)

=== Game 3 ===
October 26, 1999, at Yankee Stadium in New York City

| Team | 1 | 2 | 3 | 4 | 5 | 6 | 7 | 8 | 9 | 10 | R | H | E |
|---|---|---|---|---|---|---|---|---|---|---|---|---|---|
| Atlanta | 1 | 0 | 3 | 1 | 0 | 0 | 0 | 0 | 0 | 0 | 5 | 14 | 1 |
| New York | 1 | 0 | 0 | 0 | 1 | 0 | 1 | 2 | 0 | 1 | 6 | 9 | 0 |
WP: Mariano Rivera (1-0) LP: Mike Remlinger (0-1); Home runs: ATL: None; NYY: Chad Curtis 2 (2), Tino Martinez (1), Chuck Knoblauch (1)

=== Game 4 ===
October 27, 1999, at Yankee Stadium in New York City

| Team | 1 | 2 | 3 | 4 | 5 | 6 | 7 | 8 | 9 | R | H | E |
|---|---|---|---|---|---|---|---|---|---|---|---|---|
| Atlanta | 0 | 0 | 0 | 0 | 0 | 0 | 0 | 1 | 0 | 1 | 5 | 0 |
| New York | 0 | 0 | 3 | 0 | 0 | 0 | 0 | 1 | X | 4 | 8 | 0 |
WP: Roger Clemens (1-0) LP: John Smoltz (0-1) Sv: Mariano Rivera (2); Home runs: ATL: None; NYY: Jim Leyritz (1)

== Awards and honors ==
The 1999 New York Yankees team were awarded The Sporting News Sportsman of the Year award.

- Orlando Hernández, Pitcher, ALCS MVP
- Mariano Rivera, Relief Pitcher, World Series MVP
- Derek Jeter, American League Leader in Hits, 219 Hits

1999 All-Star Game

- David Cone, pitcher, reserve
- Derek Jeter, shortstop, reserve
- Mariano Rivera, relief pitcher, reserve
- Bernie Williams, outfield, reserve

== In popular culture ==
- In the 1995 Star Trek: Deep Space Nine episode "Past Tense", a character from the 2020s called the 1999 New York Yankees the best team he had ever seen. While it could be argued the 1998 team was better, it is considered remarkable that a television program that aired in 1995 could have even predicted such a successful season for a specific team.

== Farm system ==
| Level | Team | League | Manager |
|---|---|---|---|
| AAA | Columbus Clippers | International League | Trey Hillman |
| AA | Norwich Navigators | Eastern League | Lee Mazzilli |
| A | Tampa Yankees | Florida State League | Tom Nieto |
| A | Greensboro Bats | South Atlantic League | Stan Hough |
| A-Short Season | Staten Island Yankees | New York–Penn League | Joe Arnold |
| Rookie | GCL Yankees | Gulf Coast League | Ken Dominguez |
