= 1999 Tampa Bay Devil Rays season =

1999 Tampa Bay Devil Rays
- League: American League
- Division: East
- Ballpark: Tropicana Field
- City: St. Petersburg, Florida
- Record: 69–93 (.426)
- Divisional place: 5th
- Owners: Vince Naimoli
- General managers: Chuck LaMar
- Managers: Larry Rothschild
- Television: Sportschannel Florida; WWWB/WMOR; WTSP (Joe Magrane, Dewayne Staats)
- Radio: WFLA (Paul Olden, Charlie Slowes); WBDN (Eulides Nunez, Enrique Oliu)

The 1999 Tampa Bay Devil Rays season was their second since the franchise was created. They finished last in the American League East with a record of 69 wins and 93 losses. Their manager was Larry Rothschild, who entered his second year with the club.

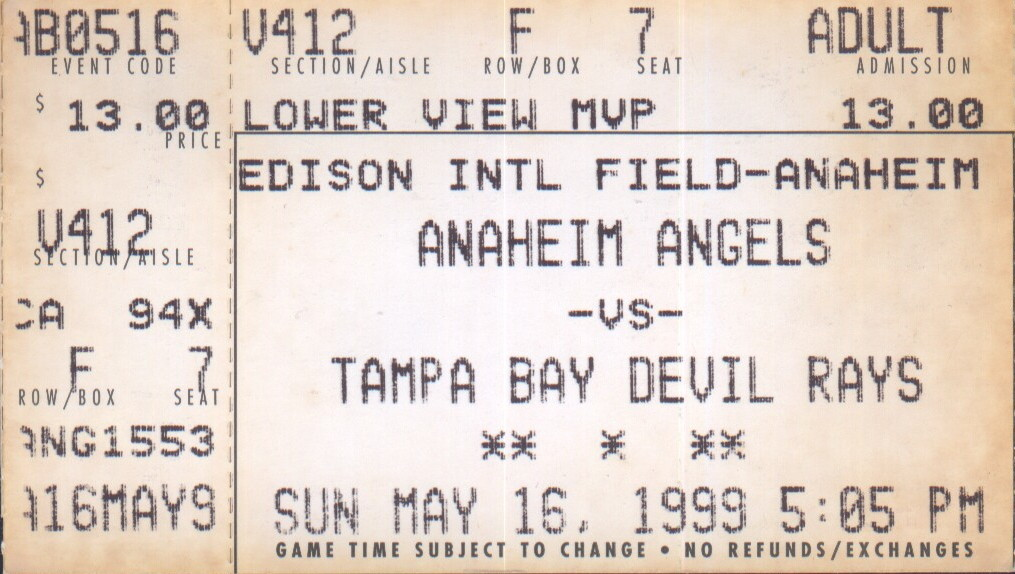
A ticket for a 1999 game between the Devil Rays and the Anaheim Angels.

== Offseason ==
- November 25, 1998: Dave Silvestri was signed as a free agent with the Tampa Bay Devil Rays.
- December 11, 1998: José Canseco signed as a free agent with the Tampa Bay Devil Rays.
- February 3, 1999: Joe Oliver was signed as a free agent with the Tampa Bay Devil Rays.
- February 19, 1999: Julio Franco was signed as a free agent with the Tampa Bay Devil Rays.
- March 31, 1999: Mike Kelly was released by the Tampa Bay Devil Rays.

== Regular season ==
- On August 7, 1999, Wade Boggs had the 3,000th hit of his career. The hit was a home run.

=== Opening Day starters ===
2	Randy Winn	CF
14	Dave Martinez	RF
33	Jose Canseco	DH
29	Fred McGriff	1B
23	John Flaherty	C
12	Wade Boggs	3B
44	Paul Sorrento	LF
13	Miguel Cairo	2B
19	Kevin Stocker	SS
40	Wilson Alvarez	P

=== Season standings ===
AL East
Team	W	L	Pct.	GB	Home	Road
New York Yankees	98	64	.605	—	48‍–‍33	50‍–‍31
Boston Red Sox	94	68	.580	4	49‍–‍32	45‍–‍36
Toronto Blue Jays	84	78	.519	14	40‍–‍41	44‍–‍37
Baltimore Orioles	78	84	.481	20	41‍–‍40	37‍–‍44
Tampa Bay Devil Rays	69	93	.426	29	33‍–‍48	36‍–‍45

=== Record vs. opponents ===
1999 American League record Source: MLB Standings Grid – 1999
Team	ANA	BAL	BOS	CWS	CLE	DET	KC	MIN	NYY	OAK	SEA	TB	TEX	TOR	NL
Anaheim	—	3–9	1–9	5–5	1–9	5–5	7–5	6–4	6–4	8–4	6–6	7–5	6–6	3–9	6–12
Baltimore	9–3	—	5–7	7–3	1–9	5–5	6–4	8–1	4–9	5–7	5–5	5–7	6–6	1–11	11–7
Boston	9–1	7–5	—	7–5	8–4	7–5	8–2	6–4	8–4	4–6	7–3	4–9	4–5	9–3	6–12
Chicago	5–5	3–7	5–7	—	3–9	7–5	6–6	8–3–1	5–7	3–7	4–8	6–4	5–5	6–4	9–9
Cleveland	9–1	9–1	4–8	9–3	—	8–5	7–5	9–3	3–7	10–2	7–3	5–4	3–7	5–7	9–9
Detroit	5–5	5–5	5–7	5–7	5–8	—	7–4	6–6	5–7	4–6	3–7	4–5	5–5	2–10	8–10
Kansas City	5–7	4–6	2–8	6–6	5–7	4–7	—	5–8	5–4	6–6	7–5	2–8	4–6	3–7	6–12
Minnesota	4–6	1–8	4–6	3–8–1	3–9	6–6	8–5	—	4–6	7–5	4–8	5–5	0–12	4–6	10–7
New York	4–6	9–4	4–8	7–5	7–3	7–5	4–5	6–4	—	6–4	9–1	8–4	8–4	10–2	9–9
Oakland	4–8	7–5	6–4	7–3	2–10	6–4	6–6	5–7	4–6	—	6–6	9–1	5–7	8–2	12–6
Seattle	6–6	5–5	3–7	8–4	3–7	7–3	5–7	8–4	1–9	6–6	—	8–4	5–8	7–2	7–11
Tampa Bay	5–7	7–5	9–4	4–6	4–5	5–4	8–2	5–5	4–8	1–9	4–8	—	4–8	5–8	4–14
Texas	6–6	6–6	5–4	5–5	7–3	5–5	6–4	12–0	4–8	7–5	8–5	8–4	—	6–4	10–8
Toronto	9–3	11–1	3–9	4–6	7–5	10–2	7–3	6–4	2–10	2–8	2–7	8–5	4–6	—	9–9

=== Notable transactions ===
- April 9, 1999: Dave Silvestri was released by the Tampa Bay Devil Rays.
- May 27, 1999: Aaron Small was signed as a free agent with the Tampa Bay Devil Rays.
- July 23, 1999: Joe Oliver was traded by the Tampa Bay Devil Rays with Humberto Cota to the Pittsburgh Pirates for Jose Guillen and Jeff Sparks.
- June 23, 1999: Jim Morris was signed as a free agent with the Tampa Bay Devil Rays.

==== Draft picks ====
- June 2, 1999: Josh Hamilton was drafted by the Tampa Bay Devil Rays in the 1st round (1st pick) of the 1999 amateur draft. Player signed June 3, 1999.
- June 2, 1999: Carl Crawford was drafted by the Tampa Bay Devil Rays in the 2nd round of the 1999 amateur draft. Player signed June 14, 1999.
- June 2, 1999: Doug Waechter was drafted by the Tampa Bay Devil Rays in the 3rd round of the 1999 amateur draft. Player signed June 27, 1999.

=== Citrus Series ===
The season series each year between the Devil Rays and the Florida Marlins has come to be known as the Citrus Series. In 1999, the Marlins won the series 5 games to 1.

- June 4 - Devil Rays vs Marlins: 0 – 10
- June 5 - Devil Rays vs Marlins: 7 – 9
- June 6 - Devil Rays vs Marlins: 6 – 11
- July 9 - Devil Rays @ Marlins: 4 – 11
- July 10 - Devil Rays @ Marlins: 9 – 8
- July 11 - Devil Rays @ Marlins: 2 – 3

=== The Rookie ===
While coaching baseball for the Reagan County Owls, Jim Morris made a promise to his team that he would try out for Major League Baseball if his team won the District Championship, something the team had never accomplished before. His team won the title, and Morris kept his end of the bargain. At tryouts, the Major League scout for the Tampa Bay Devil Rays initially wasn't interested in Morris. But, the scout agreed to allow him to try out so Morris could keep his promise to his students. Surprisingly, Morris discovered that in spite of his age, and having several surgeries on his arm, he was able to throw a 98-mph fastball. In fact, he threw 12 consecutive 98-mph fastballs. After much debate with his family, Morris signed a professional contract with the Tampa Bay Devil Rays organization at the age of 35. He started out with the Minor League Class AA Orlando Rays but after a few appearances he moved up to a spot with the AAA Durham Bulls. Thanks to solid performances with Durham, Tampa Bay gave him a chance to pitch with the big club when the rosters expanded, and on September 18, 1999, against Royce Clayton of the Texas Rangers, the 35-year-old Morris made his debut, striking Clayton out on four pitches. His goal of pitching in the majors was finally realized, and he made four more appearances later that year.

=== Roster ===
1999 Tampa Bay Devil Rays
Roster
Pitchers: 37 Scott Aldred; 40 Wilson Álvarez; 30 Rolando Arrojo; 61 Mickey Callaway; 35,37 Norm Charlton; 47 Mike Duvall; 48 Dave Eiland; 28 Eddie Gaillard; 39 Roberto Hernández; 27 Cory Lidle; 32 Albie Lopez; 45 Jim Mecir; 63 Jim Morris; 46 Alan Newman; 56 Bryan Rekar; 24 Ryan Rupe; 80 Julio Santana; 31 Tony Saunders; 62 Jeff Sparks; 34 Dan Wheeler; 51 Rick White; 53 Bobby Witt; 43 Esteban Yan	Catchers: 8 Mike DiFelice; 6 John Flaherty; Infielders: 12 Wade Boggs; 13 Miguel Cairo; 28 Steve Cox; 18 Julio Franco; 26 Tony Graffanino; 15 David Lamb; 4 Aaron Ledesma; 29 Fred McGriff; 34 Herbert Perry; 9 Bob Smith; 19 Kevin Stocker	Outfielders: 10 Rich Butler; 33 Jose Canseco; 41 Danny Clyburn; 30 José Guillén; 50 Terrell Lowery; 14 Dave Martinez; 3 Quinton McCracken; 44 Paul Sorrento; 21 Bubba Trammell; 2 Randy Winn	Manager: 11 Larry Rothschild; Coaches: 23 Orlando Gómez (Bullpen); 22 Billy Hatcher (First Base); 25 Frank Howard (Bench); 7 Greg Riddoch (Third Base); 5 Leon Roberts (Hitting); 38 Rick Williams (Pitching)

== Player stats ==
= Indicates team leader

=== Batting ===
==== Starters by position ====
Note: G = Games played; AB = At bats; H = Hits; Avg. = Batting average; HR = Home runs; RBI = Runs batted in; SB = Stolen bases

Pos	Player	G	AB	H	Avg.	HR	RBI	SB
C	John Flaherty	117	446	124	.278	14	71	0
1B	Fred McGriff	144	529	164	.310	32	104	1
2B	Miguel Cairo	120	465	137	.295	3	36	22
3B	Wade Boggs	90	292	88	.301	2	29	1
SS	Kevin Stocker	79	254	76	.299	1	27	9
LF	Bubba Trammell	82	283	82	.290	14	39	0
CF	Randy Winn	79	303	81	.267	2	24	9
RF	Dave Martinez	143	514	146	.284	6	66	13
DH	José Canseco	113	430	120	.279	34	95	3

==== Other batters ====
Note: G = Games played; AB = At bats; H = Hits; Avg. = Batting average; HR = Home runs; RBI = Runs batted in; SB = Stolen bases

Player	G	AB	H	Avg.	HR	RBI	SB
Rich Butler	7	20	3	.150	0	0	0
Danny Clyburn	28	81	16	.198	3	5	0
Steve Cox	6	19	4	.211	0	0	0
Mike Difelice	51	179	55	.307	6	27	0
Julio Franco	1	1	0	.000	0	0	0
Tony Graffanino	39	130	41	.315	2	19	3
José Guillén	47	168	41	.244	2	13	0
David Lamb	55	12	28	.226	1	13	0
Aaron Ledesma	93	294	78	.265	0	30	1
Terrell Lowery	66	185	48	.259	2	17	0
Quinton McCracken	40	148	37	.250	1	18	6
Herbert Perry	66	209	53	.254	6	32	0
Bob Smith	68	199	36	.181	3	19	4
Paul Sorrento	99	294	69	.235	11	42	1

=== Starting pitchers ===
Note: G = Games pitched; IP = Innings pitched; W = Wins; L = Losses; ERA = Earned run average; SO = Strikeouts

Player	G	IP	W	L	ERA	SO
Bobby Witt	32	180.1	7	15	5.84	123
Wilson Álvarez	28	160.0	9	9	4.22	128
Ryan Rupe	24	142.1	8	9	4.55	97
Rolando Arrojo	24	140.2	7	12	5.18	107
Tony Saunders	9	42.0	3	3	6.43	30
Dan Wheeler	6	30.2	0	4	5.87	32

==== Other pitchers ====
Note: G = Games pitched; IP = Innings pitched; W = Wins; L = Losses; ERA = Earned run average; SO = Strikeouts; Sv = Saves

Player	G	IP	W	L	ERA	SO	Sv
Mickey Callaway	5	19.1	1	2	7.45	11	0
Dave Eiland	21	80.1	4	8	5.60	53	0
Cory Lidle	5	5.0	1	0	7.20	4	0
Bryan Rekar	27	94.2	6	6	5.80	55	0
Julio Santana	22	55.1	1	4	7.32	34	0

==== Relief pitchers ====
Note: G = Games pitched; IP = Innings pitched; W = Wins; L = Losses; ERA = Earned run average; SO = Strikeouts; Sv = Saves

Player	G	IP	W	L	ERA	SO	Sv
Scott Aldred	37	24.1	3	2	5.18	22	0
Wade Boggs	1	1.1	0	0	6.75	1	0
Norm Charlton	42	50.2	2	3	4.44	45	0
Mike Duvall	40	40.0	1	1	4.05	18	0
Eddie Gaillard	8	8.2	1	0	2.08	7	0
Roberto Hernández	72	73.1	2	3	3.07	69	43
Albie Lopez	51	64.0	3	2	4.64	37	1
Jim Mecir	17	20.2	0	1	2.61	15	0
Jim Morris	5	4.2	0	0	5.79	3	0
Alan Newman	18	15.2	2	2	6.89	20	0
Jeff Sparks	8	10.0	0	0	5.40	17	1
Rick White	63	108.0	5	3	4.08	81	0
Esteban Yan	50	61.0	3	4	5.90	46	0

== Game log ==
Game Log
April (12-12)

#	Date	Opponent	Score	Win	Loss	Save	Attendance	Record
1	April 5	@ Orioles	10 – 7	Mussina (1–0)	Alvarez (0–1)	Timlin (1)	46,733	0-1
2	April 7	@ Orioles	8 – 5	Saunders (1–0)	Guzman (0–1)	Hernandez (1)	42,284	1-1
3	April 8	@ Orioles	6 – 3	Witt (1–0)	Erickson (0–1)		39,853	2-1
4	April 9	Red Sox	4 – 1	Portugal (1–0)	Arrojo (0–1)		40,525	2-2
5	April 10	Red Sox	5 – 3	Martinez (2–0)	Santana (0–1)	Gordon (3)	28,522	2-3
6	April 11	Red Sox	5 – 4	Aldred (1–0)	Lowe (0–1)	Hernandez (2)	23,404	3-3
7	April 12	@ Blue Jays	7 – 1	Wells (2–0)	Saunders (1–1)		37,160	3-4
8	April 13	@ Blue Jays	8 – 5	White (1–0)	Hamilton (0–2)	Hernandez (3)	23,710	4-4
9	April 14	@ Blue Jays	7 – 6 (11)	Lloyd (1–0)	Lopez (0–1)		23,847	4-5
10	April 15	@ Blue Jays	11 – 1	Carpenter (1–1)	Santana (0–2)		23,765	4-6
11	April 16	@ Red Sox	6 – 2	Rekar (1–0)	Wakefield (1–1)		18,809	5-6
12	April 17	@ Red Sox	8 – 5	Portugal (2–0)	Saunders (1–2)		26,799	5-7
13	April 18	@ Red Sox	5 – 1	Witt (2–0)	Rapp (0–1)		27,589	6-7
14	April 19	@ Red Sox	4 – 1	Arrojo (1–1)	Saberhagen (2–1)	Hernandez (4)	33,167	7-7
15	April 20	Orioles	5 – 3	Santana (1–2)	Erickson (0–3)	Hernandez (5)	17,660	8-7
16	April 21	Orioles	14 – 8	Rekar (2–0)	Mussina (2–1)		22,119	9-7
17	April 22	Orioles	1 – 0	Saunders (2–2)	Ponson (0–2)	Hernandez (6)	17,334	10-7
18	April 23	Mariners	5 – 4	White (2–0)	Halama (0–2)	Hernandez (7)	20,322	11-7
19	April 24	Mariners	9 – 4	Henry (2–0)	Arrojo (1–2)		26,065	11-8
20	April 25	Mariners	6 – 4	Paniagua (2–2)	Hernandez (0–1)	Mesa (5)	27,163	11-9
21	April 28	@ White Sox	10 – 7	Parque (3–1)	Rekar (2–1)	Howry (6)	?	11-10
22	April 28	@ White Sox	9 – 1	Snyder (3–1)	Saunders (2–3)		10,300	11-11
23	April 29	@ White Sox	4 – 1	Alvarez (1–1)	Sirotka (1–3	Hernandez (8)	10,022	12-11
24	April 30	Tigers	7 – 5	Weaver (3–1)	Arrojo (1–3)	Jones (3)	19,177	12-12

May (11-15)

#	Date	Opponent	Score	Win	Loss	Save	Attendance	Record
25	May 1	Tigers	4 – 3	Witt (3–0)	Moehler (3–3)	Hernandez (9)	20,040	13-12
26	May 2	Tigers	8 – 2	Thompson (4–2)	Santana (1–3)		20,644	13-13
27	May 3	Tigers	14 – 6	Yan (1–0)	Blair (0–4)		15,430	14-13
28	May 4	@ Royals	5 – 3	Mathews (2–0)	Hernandez (0–2)		15,470	14-14
29	May 5	@ Royals	10 – 7	White (3–0)	Witasick (0–2)	Hernandez (10)	16,111	15-14
30	May 6	@ Royals	5 – 4	Aldred (2–0)	Morman (1–1)	Hernandez (11)	15,321	16-14
31	May 7	@ Indians	20 – 11	Wagner (1–0)	Mecir (0–1)		40,601	16-15
32	May 8	@ Indians	7 – 6	Rekar (3–1)	Nagy (3–3)	Hernandez (12)	40,590	17-15
33	May 9	@ Indians	5 – 4	Wright (4–0)	Alvarez (1–2)	Jackson (8)	42,835	17-16
34	May 11	Twins	2 – 1	Radke (4–2)	Rupe (0–1)	Aguilera (6)	17,227	17-17
35	May 12	Twins	9 – 4	Milton (1–3)	Arrojo (1–4)	Trombley (2)	18,068	17-18
36	May 14	@ Angels	8 – 3	Belcher (2–3)	Witt (3–1)		35,515	17-19
37	May 15	@ Angels	3 – 1	Saunders (3–3)	Hill (1–3)	Hernandez (13)	36,939	18-19
38	May 16	@ Angels	7 – 4	Alvarez (2–2)	Sparks (1–4)		35,064	19-19
39	May 17	@ Rangers	13 – 3	Rupe (1–1)	Burkett (0–3)		29,946	20-19
40	May 18	@ Rangers	5 – 4	Arrojo (2–4)	Morgan (6–3)	Hernandez (14)	29,706	21-19
41	May 19	@ Rangers	7 – 6	Zimmerman (3–0)	Aldred (2–1)	Wetteland (12)	29,513	21-20
42	May 21	Angels	10 – 9	White (4–0)	Magnante (1–1)	Hernandez (15)	20,687	22-20
43	May 22	Angels	8 – 6	Petkovsek (4–1)	Newman (0–1)	Percival (11)	23,168	22-21
44	May 23	Angels	4 – 0 (10)	Finley (3–4)	Hernandez (0–3)		22,522	22-22
45	May 24	Rangers	12 – 3	Clark (3–3)	Arrojo (2–5)		15,820	22-23
46	May 25	Rangers	7 – 2	Venafro (1–0)	Witt (3–2)		16,058	22-24
47	May 26	Rangers	8 – 6	Helling (5–5)	Santana (1–4)	Wetteland (14)	17,575	22-25
48	May 28	@ Mariners	6 – 1	García (6–1)	Alvarez (2–3)		25,421	22-26
49	May 29	@ Mariners	11 – 5	Fassero (3–6)	Rupe (1–2)		38,093	22-27
50	May 30	@ Mariners	15 – 7	Rekar (4–1)	Cloude (3–2)		29,090	23-27
51	May 31	@ Athletics	10 – 7	Groom (1–0)	Yan (1–1)		10,444	23-28

June (10-16)

#	Date	Opponent	Score	Win	Loss	Save	Attendance	Record
52	June 1	@ Athletics	5 – 2	Rogers (3–2)	Eiland (0–1)	Taylor (13)	7,170	23-29
53	June 2	@ Athletics	7 – 6	Yan (2–1)	Mathews (5–2)	Hernandez (16)	17,505	24-29
54	June 4	Marlins	10 – 0	Springer (2–6)	Rupe (1–3)		20,167	24-30
55	June 5	Marlins	9 – 7	Meadows (5–5)	Duvall (0–1)	Mantei (7)	22,686	24-31
56	June 6	Marlins	11 – 6	Alfonseca (2–4)	Yan (2–2)		21,321	24-32
57	June 7	@ Braves	9 – 5	Smoltz (7–1)	Eiland (0–2)	Rocker (13)	36,731	24-33
58	June 8	@ Braves	11 – 2	Pérez (4–2)	Alvarez (2–4)		35,709	24-34
59	June 9	@ Braves	4 – 3 (12)	McGlinchy (3–2)	White (4–1)		35,160	24-35
60	June 11	@ Expos	5 – 4	Batista (6 – 2)	Witt (3–3)	Urbina (13)	7,067	24-36
61	June 12	@ Expos	5 – 3	Callaway (1–0)	Hermanson (3–6)	Hernandez (17)	9,307	25-36
62	June 13	@ Expos	0 – 4	Pavano (5–5)	Rekar (4–2)		7,234	25-37
63	June 14	@ White Sox	9 – 7	Snyder (7–5)	Alvarez (2–5)	Howry (11)	15,457	25-38
64	June 15	@ White Sox	3 – 2	Rupe (2–3)	Baldwin (3–6)	Hernandez (18)	11,347	26-38
65	June 16	@ White Sox	3 – 2 (11)	Lowe (3–0)	Charlton (0–1)		10,903	26-39
66	June 18	@ Twins	8 – 5	Wells (4–1)	Aldred (2–2)	Trombley (9)	24,157	26-40
67	June 19	@ Twins	4 – 3	Rekar (5–2)	Radke (5–6)	Hernandez (19)	16,823	27-40
68	June 20	@ Twins	6 – 5 (11)	Newman (1–1)	Trombley (1–4)		15,413	28-40
69	June 21	@ Twins	3 – 2	Rupe (3–3)	Radlosky (0–1)	Hernandez (20)	13,878	29-40
70	June 22	Yankees	7 – 0	Hernández (8–6)	Witt (3–4)		30,290	29-41
71	June 23	Yankees	12 – 4	Clemens (7–2)	Eiland (0–3)		30,474	29-42
72	June 24	Yankees	7 – 3	Pettitte (5–5)	Rekar (5–3)	Mendoza (2)	30,499	29-43
73	June 25	Blue Jays	11 – 4	Alvarez (3–5)	Wells (8–6)		18,633	30-43
74	June 26	Blue Jays	5 – 2	Rupe (4–3)	Hamilton (1–5)	Hernandez (21)	22,062	31-43
75	June 27	Blue Jays	8 – 0	Witt (4–4)	Escobar (7–5)		20,556	32-43
76	June 28	Blue Jays	3 – 2	Carpenter (5–5)	Eiland (0–4)	Koch (9)	17,727	32-44
77	June 30	@ Red Sox	11 – 10 (10)	Hernandez (1–3)	Wasdin (7–1)		27,961	33-44

July (9-16)

#	Date	Opponent	Score	Win	Loss	Save	Attendance	Record
78	July 1	@ Red Sox	12 – 3	Alvarez (4–5)	Cho (2–1)		29,270	34-44
79	July 2	@ Blue Jays	8 – 7	Aldred (3–2)	Escobar (7–6)	Hernandez (22)	23,109	35-44
80	July 3	@ Blue Jays	5 – 0	Carpenter (6–5)	Witt (4–5)		25,344	35-45
81	July 4	@ Blue Jays	6 – 3	Hentgen (6–6)	White (4–2)	Koch (11)	24,639	35-46
82	July 5	Red Sox	4 – 2	Portugal (5–6)	Rekar (5–4)	Wakefield (9)	21,967	35-47
83	July 6	Red Sox	6 – 4	Lopez (1–1)	Wasdin (7–2)	Hernandez (23)	17,309	36-47
84	July 7	Red Sox	3 – 2	Eiland (1–4)	Martínez (15–3)	Hernandez (24)	20,959	37-47
85	July 8	Red Sox	3 – 2	Witt (5–5)	Rose (4–2)	Hernandez (25)	21,160	38-47
86	July 9	@ Marlins	11 – 4	Hernández (5–8)	Rupe (4–4)		17,976	38-48
87	July 10	@ Marlins	9 – 8	Rekar (6–4)	Springer (3–10)	Hernandez (26)	26,516	39-48
88	July 11	@ Marlins	3 – 2	Fernandez (4–5)	Alvarez (4–6)	Alfonseca (1)	19,984	39-49
89	July 15	Mets	8 – 7 (10)	Benítez (1–2)	Charlton (0–2)		20,905	39-50
90	July 16	Mets	9 – 7	Reed (7–3)	Eiland (1–5)	Cook (2)	22,858	39-51
91	July 17	Mets	3 – 2	Alvarez (5–6)	Hershiser (9–7)	Hernandez (27)	40,186	40-51
92	July 18	Phillies	3 – 2	Schilling (14–4)	Lopez (1–2)		20,075	40-52
93	July 19	Phillies	16 – 3	Ogea (5–9)	Rekar (6–5)		17,600	40-53
94	July 20	Phillies	5 – 4 (13)	Charlton (1–2)	Schrenk (0–1)		30,868	41-53
95	July 21	@ Yankees	4 – 3	Hernández (11–6)	Witt (5–6)	Rivera (25)	27,566	41-54
96	July 22	@ Yankees	5 – 4	Pettitte (7–7)	Rekar (6–6)	Rivera (26)	40,557	41-55
97	July 23	Rangers	11 – 8	Kolb (1–0)	Rupe (4–5)		18,960	41-56
98	July 24	Rangers	5 – 3	Loaiza (2–1)	Newman (1–2)	Wetteland (28)	22,780	41-57
99	July 25	Rangers	4 – 3	Helling (8–7)	Arrojo (2–6)	Wetteland (29)	21,202	41-58
100	July 26	Angels	7 – 0	Witt (6–6)	Olivares (8–9)		15,596	42-58
101	July 27	Angels	10 – 5	Magnante (3–1)	Callaway (1–1)		15,702	42-59
102	July 28	Angels	4 – 1	Rupe (5–5)	McDowell (0–2)	Hernandez (28)	18,336	43-59
103	July 30	@ Athletics	4 – 1	Oquist (8–7)	Eiland (1–6)	Taylor (26)	9,269	43-60
104	July 31	@ Athletics	5 – 1	Olivares (9–9)	Arrojo (2–7)	Jones (5)	20,081	43-61

August (16-12)

#	Date	Opponent	Score	Win	Loss	Save	Attendance	Record
105	August 1	@ Athletics	10 – 6	Heredia (8–5)	Witt (6–7)	Mathews (2)	24,951	43-62
106	August 2	@ Mariners	4 – 0	García (11–6)	Callaway (1–2)	Paniagua (2)	45,118	43-63
107	August 3	@ Mariners	5 – 2	Halama (9–2)	Rupe (5–6)	Mesa (23)	37,180	43-64
108	August 4	@ Mariners	7 – 1	Eiland (2–6)	Meche (2–2)		42,336	44-64
109	August 6	Indians	4 – 2	Yan (3–2)	Burba (8–7)	Hernandez (29)	34,623	45-64
110	August 7	Indians	15 – 10	Nagy (13–7)	Witt (6–8)		39,512	45-65
111	August 8	Indians	5 – 3	Alvarez (6–6)	Wright (7–7)	Hernandez (30)	33,052	46-65
112	August 9	Orioles	10 – 9	Rupe (6–6)	Johnson (3–6)	Hernandez (31)	17,796	47-65
113	August 10	Orioles	17 – 1	Ponson (11–7)	Eiland (2–7)		17,848	47-66
114	August 11	Orioles	4 – 2	Mussina (14–7)	Arrojo (2–8)	Timlin (15)	17,824	47-67
115	August 12	@ Royals	7 – 6	Witt (7–8)	Reichert (1–1)	Hernandez (32)	16,201	48-67
116	August 13	@ Royals	2 – 1	Service (5–4)	Yan (3–3)		23,835	48-68
117	August 14	@ Royals	11 – 4	Rupe (7–6)	Suppan (7–7)		20,684	49-68
118	August 15	@ Royals	5 – 3	Eiland (3–7)	Suzuki (0–4)	Hernandez (33)	19,162	50-68
119	August 16	@ Tigers	9 – 1	Arrojo (3–8)	Weaver (6–9)		21,102	51-68
120	August 17	@ Tigers	3 – 1	Mlicki (8–11)	Witt (7–9)	Jones (19)	19,418	51-69
121	August 18	@ Tigers	4 – 0	Alvarez (7–6)	Borkowski (0–4)	Lopez (1)	21,311	52-69
122	August 20	Royals	5 – 4	Hernandez (2–3)	Service (5–5)		18,396	53-69
123	August 21	Royals	8 – 2	Eiland (4–7)	Witasick (4–10)		35,769	54-69
124	August 22	Royals	2 – 1	Arrojo (4–8)	Rosado (7–11)		27,864	55-69
125	August 23	White Sox	10 – 2	Baldwin (8–11)	Witt (7–10)		15,386	55-70
126	August 24	White Sox	6 – 5	Alvarez (8–6)	Parque (9–10)	Hernandez (34)	15,425	56-70
127	August 25	White Sox	6 – 1	Foulke (2–3)	Rupe (7–7)		15,468	56-71
128	August 26	White Sox	9 – 7	White (5–2)	Snyder (9–9)	Hernandez (35)	16,475	57-71
129	August 27	@ Indians	2 – 1	Burba (11–7)	Arrojo (4–9)	Jackson (30)	43,303	57-72
130	August 28	@ Indians	3 – 0	Nagy (14–9)	Witt (7–11)	Jackson (31)	43,190	57-73
131	August 29	@ Indians	6 – 4	Alvarez (9–6)	Haney (0–1)	Hernandez (36)	43,151	58-73
132	August 31	@ Orioles	3 – 0	Rupe (8–7)	Ponson (11–10)	Hernandez (37)	36,223	59-73

September (9-18)

#	Date	Opponent	Score	Win	Loss	Save	Attendance	Record
133	September 1	@ Orioles	3 – 1	Johns (4–2)	Wheeler (0–1)	Timlin (18)	37,009	59-74
134	September 2	@ Orioles	11 – 6	Erickson (11–11)	Arrojo (4–10)		39,172	59-75
135	September 3	Twins	4 – 2	Charlton (2–2)	Guardado (2–4)	Hernandez (38)	15,355	60-75
136	September 4	Twins	11 – 3	Lopez (2–2)	Miller (2–1)		17,805	61-75
137	September 5	Twins	4 – 1	Radke (12–12)	Rupe (8–8)		17,480	61-76
138	September 6	Twins	13 – 7	Carrasco (2–2)	White (5–3)		16,929	61-77
139	September 8	Tigers	5 – 1	Mlicki (12–11)	Witt (7–12)		14,887	61-78
140	September 9	Tigers	5 – 3	Arrojo (5–10)	Nitkowski (2–5)	Hernandez (39)	15,056	62-78
141	September 10	Athletics	7 – 2	Hudson (10–1)	Alvarez (9–7)		16,182	62-79
142	September 11	Athletics	5 – 4	Olivares (14–10)	Rupe (8–9)	Jones (9)	25,362	62-80
143	September 12	Athletics	4 – 3	Heredia (12–7)	Wheeler (0–2)	Isringhausen (5)	25,147	62-81
144	September 13	Athletics	8 – 3	Appier (15–12)	Witt (7–13)		14,936	62-82
145	September 14	Mariners	5 – 1	Moyer (14–6)	Arrojo (5–11)		15,154	62-83
146	September 15	Mariners	8 – 4	Lopez (3–2)	Rodriguez (2–4)		15,542	63-83
147	September 16	Mariners	5 – 3	García (15–8)	Yan (3–4)	Mesa (33)	15,817	63-84
148	September 17	@ Rangers	7 – 5	Newman (2–2)	Helling (13–9)	Hernandez (40)	33,695	64-84
149	September 18	@ Rangers	6 – 1	Sele (17–8)	Witt (7–14)		36,820	64-85
150	September 19	@ Rangers	15 – 2	Arrojo (6–11)	Burkett (7–8)		24,930	65-85
151	September 20	@ Angels	10 – 5	Finley (11–11)	Alvarez (9–8)		16,165	65-86
152	September 21	@ Angels	7 – 5	Ortiz (2–3)	Eiland (4–8)	Percival (31)	16,486	65-87
153	September 22	@ Angels	8 – 5	Washburn (3–4)	Wheeler (0–3)		16,801	65-88
154	September 24	@ Yankees	4 – 3 (11)	Stanton (2–2)	Charlton (2–3)		44,932	65-89
155	September 25	@ Yankees	2 – 1	Arrojo (7–11)	Cone (11–9)	Hernandez (41)	50,403	66-89
156	September 26	@ Yankees	6 – 5	Lidle (1–0)	Mendoza (7–9)	Hernandez (42)	49,458	67-89
157	September 27	@ Yankees	10 – 6	Duvall (1–1)	Irabu (11–7)	Sparks (1)	41,355	68-89
158	September 28	Blue Jays	8 – 2	Wells (16–10)	Wheeler (0–4)		19,781	68-90
159	September 29	Blue Jays	6 – 2	Escobar (14–11)	Witt (7–15)		22,180	68-91

October (1-2)

#	Date	Opponent	Score	Win	Loss	Save	Attendance	Record
160	October 1	Yankees	11 – 7	Mendoza (9–9)	Arrojo (7–12)	Rivera (44)	27,248	68-92
161	October 2	Yankees	3 – 2	Cone (12–9)	Álvarez (9–9)	Rivera (45)	40,756	68-93
162	October 3	Yankees	6 – 2	Gaillard (1–0)	Juden (0–1)	Hernandez (43)	31,292	69-93

== Farm system ==
Level	Team	League	Manager
AAA	Durham Bulls	International League	Bill Evers
AA	Orlando Rays	Southern League	Bill Russell
A	St. Petersburg Devil Rays	Florida State League	Roy Silver
A	Charleston RiverDogs	South Atlantic League	Charlie Montoyo
A-Short Season	Hudson Valley Renegades	New York–Penn League	Edwin Rodríguez
Rookie	Princeton Devil Rays	Appalachian League	Bobby Ramos

LEAGUE CHAMPIONS: Orlando, Hudson Valley
