= Red Morgan =

American baseball player (1883-1981)

- Third baseman
- Born: October 6, 1883; Neola, Iowa, U.S.
- Died: March 25, 1981 (aged 97); New York City, U.S.
- Batted: Right Threw: Right

MLB debut
- June 20, 1906, for the Boston Americans

Last MLB appearance
- October 6, 1906, for the Boston Americans

MLB statistics
- Batting average: .215
- Hits: 66
- Runs batted in: 21
- Stats at Baseball Reference

Teams
- Boston Americans (1906)

James Edward "Red" Morgan (October 6, 1883 – March 25, 1981) was an American professional baseball player. He played part of one season in Major League Baseball for the Boston Americans in 1906 as a third baseman. Listed at 5 ft 10 in (1.78 m), 180 lb., Morgan threw right-handed (batting side unknown).

A native of Neola, Iowa, Morgan attended University of Notre Dame and Georgetown University, playing baseball at both schools. During this time, he played for an amateur baseball club, the Neola Erins, which was one of the top amateur clubs at the time.

After playing for the minor league Providence Clamdiggers in 1905, Morgan was acquired by Boston as a replacement for injured player/manager Jimmy Collins. Although Collins was no longer the manager in 1907, he returned to third base and Morgan never appeared in a major league again.

In one season career, Morgan was a .215 hitter (66-for-307) with one home run and 21 RBI in 88 games, including 20 runs, six doubles, three triples and seven stolen bases.

Following his majors career, Morgan played for the Montreal Royals of the International League, serving as the team's interim manager during the 1907 season.

Morgan died at the age of 97 in New York City. At the time of his death, he was recognized as the oldest living former major league player.

Records
| Preceded by Sam Edmonston | Oldest recognized verified living baseball player April 12, 1979 – March 25, 1981 | Succeeded by Jack Snyder |
