= Sam Edmonston =

American baseball player

- Pitcher
- Born: August 30, 1883; Washington, D.C., U.S.
- Died: April 12, 1979 (aged 95); Corpus Christi, Texas, U.S.
- Batted: Left Threw: Left

MLB debut
- June 24, 1907, for the Washington Senators

Last MLB appearance
- June 24, 1907, for the Washington Senators

MLB statistics
- Games played: 1
- Innings pitched: 3
- Earned run average: 9.00
- Stats at Baseball Reference

Teams
- Washington Senators (1907)

Samuel Sherwood Edmonston (August 30, 1883 – April 12, 1979) was an American professional baseball pitcher in Major League Baseball, who played in one game for the Washington Senators in 1907. He also attended Georgetown University. At the time of his death, Edmonston was the oldest living former major league player.

Records
Preceded by Paddy Livingston	Oldest recognized verified living baseball player September 19, 1977 – April 12, 1979	Succeeded by Red Morgan
