= Ryan Rupe =

American baseball player (born 1975)

- Pitcher
- Born: March 31, 1975 (age 51); Houston, Texas, U.S.
- Batted: Right Threw: Right

Professional debut
- MLB: May 5, 1999, for the Tampa Bay Devil Rays
- NPB: 2004, for the Hokkaido Nippon Ham Fighters

Last appearance
- MLB: June 27, 2003, for the Boston Red Sox
- NPB: 2004, for the Hokkaido Nippon Ham Fighters

MLB statistics
- Win–loss record: 24–38
- Earned run average: 5.85
- Strikeouts: 355

NPB statistics
- Win–loss record: 1–4
- Earned run average: 6.67
- Strikeouts: 20
- Stats at Baseball Reference

Teams
- Tampa Bay Devil Rays (1999–2002); Boston Red Sox (2003); Hokkaido Nippon Ham Fighters (2004)

Ryan Kittman Rupe (born March 31, 1975) is a former right-handed pitcher in Major League Baseball. Rupe played in the majors for the Tampa Bay Devil Rays and Boston Red Sox.

== Career ==
Rupe made his major league debut in 1999 for the Devil Rays, pitching in 24 starts while finishing with an 8–9 record. He was the first player drafted by the team to make the majors. The following season, Rupe had a rough season while battling with knee problems. Rupe finished the 2000 season with an ERA of 6.92, 75 runs allowed in 91 innings and 19 home runs allowed in just 18 starts.

In 2001, Rupe pitched in 28 games (26 starts) for the Devil Rays as they struggled in a 62–100–0 season. In 143.1 innings, he allowed 30 home runs and 111 runs to go along with a record of 5–12. His ERA finished at 6.59. The following season, the Devil Rays finished with a record of 56–106–0 and Rupe recorded a decision in all 15 starts he had, going 5–10 during that stretch. He was released following the season and picked up by the Boston Red Sox.

Rupe ended his Devil Rays career with a 23–37 career record.

Rupe was the first acquisition for Theo Epstein taking over as GM of the Red Sox. Rupe had a 2.7to1 strikeout-to-walk ratio and 6.7 K's per nine innings, above-average totals in areas that are strong indicators of future performance per Epstein. Rupe signed a minor league contract with the Boston Red Sox. Rupe spent the majority of the season at the AAA level, appearing in just 4 games for the Red Sox. Rupe still holds the AAA PawSox record of most consecutive strikeouts, striking out all 9 hitters.

In 2004, Rupe played in Japan for the Hokkaido Nippon Ham Fighters. For the 2005 and 2006 seasons, Rupe spent time in the Los Angeles Dodgers and Florida Marlins minor league systems.

== Personal life ==
He married soccer player Bryn Blalack.
