= Jack Snyder (baseball) =

American baseball player (1886-1981)

- Catcher
- Born: October 6, 1886; Lincoln, Pennsylvania, U.S.
- Died: December 13, 1981 (aged 95); Brownsville, Pennsylvania, U.S.
- Batted: Right Threw: Right

MLB debut
- April 11, 1917, for the Brooklyn Robins

Last MLB appearance
- October 4, 1917, for the Brooklyn Robins

MLB statistics
- Batting average: .273
- Home runs: 0
- Runs batted in: 1
- Stats at Baseball Reference

Teams
- Brooklyn Robins (1917)

John William Snyder (October 6, 1886 – December 13, 1981) was an American professional baseball player who played the position of catcher in seven games for the 1917 Brooklyn Robins. At the time of his death, he was the oldest living former major league player.

Records
Preceded by Red Morgan	Oldest recognized verified living baseball player March 25, 1981 – December 13, 1981	Succeeded by Carl Manda
