= Omar Olivares =

Puerto Rican baseball player (born 1967)

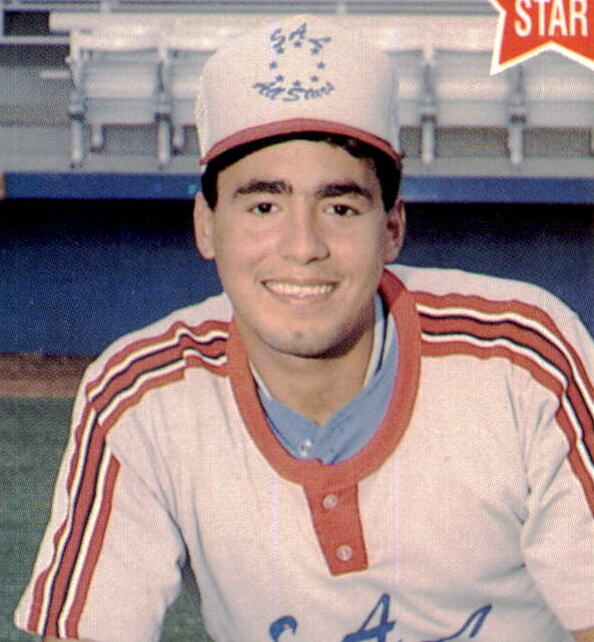
- Olivares c. 1988
- Pitcher
- Born: July 6, 1967 (age 58); Mayagüez, Puerto Rico
- Batted: Right Threw: Right

MLB debut
- August 18, 1990, for the St. Louis Cardinals

Last MLB appearance
- September 28, 2001, for the Pittsburgh Pirates

MLB statistics
- Win–loss record: 77–86
- Earned run average: 4.67
- Strikeouts: 853
- Stats at Baseball Reference

Teams
- St. Louis Cardinals (1990–1994); Colorado Rockies (1995); Philadelphia Phillies (1995); Detroit Tigers (1996–1997); Seattle Mariners (1997); Anaheim Angels (1998–1999); Oakland Athletics (1999–2000); Pittsburgh Pirates (2001)

Omar Olivares Palau (born July 6, 1967) is a Puerto Rican former starting pitcher in Major League Baseball (MLB) who played for the St. Louis Cardinals (1990–1994), Colorado Rockies (1995), Philadelphia Phillies (1995), Detroit Tigers (1996–97), Seattle Mariners (1997), Anaheim Angels (1998–99), Oakland Athletics (1999–2000) and Pittsburgh Pirates (2001). He batted and threw right-handed.

In a 12-season MLB) career, Olivares posted a 77–86 record with 826 strikeouts and a 4.67 earned run average (ERA) in 1,591 2/3 innings pitched.

Olivares was better than average hitter for a pitcher, posting a .240 batting average (58-for-242) with 25 runs, 5 home runs and 29 RBI. Considered to be a good athlete, he was occasionally used as a pinch runner and pinch hitter.

Olivares grew up in Mayagüez, Puerto Rico. He attended Miami Dade College, then signed with the San Diego Padres in September 1986. The Padres traded him to the Cardinals for Alex Cole and Steve Peters in February 1990. He made his MLB debut that August, pitching in nine MLB games. In his rookie season, he had an 11–7 record with a 3.71 ERA in 1991. He led the Cardinals with 124 strikeouts and 63 walks in 1992. He dealt with a groin injury in 1993, and the Cardinals waived him after the 1994 season.

Olivares signed with the Rockies in April 1995. The Phillies selected him off waivers in July. After the season, he signed with the Tigers. He led the 1996 Tigers with 7 wins and four complete games. Detroit traded him and Felipe Lira to the Mariners for Scott Sanders, Dean Crow, and Carlos Villalobos on July 18, 1997, following a plea from Seattle manager Lou Piniella to add pitching. He finished the season with a 6–10 record and 4.97 ERA for Detroit and Seattle.

Olivares signed a one-year, $1.35 million contract with the Angels in December 1997. The Angels traded him and Randy Velarde to the Athletics in July 1999 for Jeff DaVanon, Nathan Haynes, and Elvin Nina. Oakland traded him to the Pirates in March 2001, where he played his final MLB season. He had a career-high 10 strikeouts in May 15 against the Cardinals.

== Personal life ==
Olivares' father, Ed, played in MLB for the Cardinals in 1960 and 1961, retiring as a player in 1967, the year Olivares was born. Olivares has three children.

After his career, Olivares lived in Pennsylvania.

== See also ==
- List of second-generation Major League Baseball players
