= Bryan Rekar =

American baseball player (born 1972)

- Pitcher
- Born: June 3, 1972 (age 54); Oak Lawn, Illinois, U.S.
- Batted: Right Threw: Right

MLB debut
- July 19, 1995, for the Colorado Rockies

Last MLB appearance
- April 28, 2002, for the Kansas City Royals

MLB statistics
- Win–loss record: 25–49
- Earned run average: 5.62
- Strikeouts: 383
- Stats at Baseball Reference

Teams
- Colorado Rockies (1995–1997); Tampa Bay Devil Rays (1998–2001); Kansas City Royals (2002)

Bryan Robert Rekar (born June 3, 1972) is an American former professional baseball pitcher who played for the Colorado Rockies, Tampa Bay Devil Rays, and Kansas City Royals of Major League Baseball (MLB) during an 8-year career.

Rekar grew up in Mokena, Illinois and attended Providence Catholic High School in New Lenox, Illinois and was All-State his Junior year with a 10-0 record and a 0.90 earned run average.

== Playing career ==
=== Bradley University ===
Bryan received a scholarship to play baseball at Bradley University where he was a 1st Team All-Missouri Valley Conference his sophomore and junior years recording 16 wins to 6 loses and an earned run average of 2.39 those 2 years. Rekar was later voted to the All-Centennial Missouri Valley Conference for Baseball and was elected into the Bradley University Hall of Fame for his baseball career.

=== Colorado Rockies ===
Selected in the second round of the 1993 amateur draft by the Rockies, he would wind up called up to the majors by them in 1995, pitching in 15 games. He would spend the next two seasons with the club compiling a 7-10 record with a 6.54 ERA.

=== Tampa Bay Devil Rays ===
In 1998, he wound up being drafted by the expansion team Tampa Bay Devil Rays. In 2000, he set a career high in wins (7), ERA (4.41), innings pitched (173.1) and starts (27).

2001 would not be his best season. He went 13 straight starts without recording a win. He finished that season with a 3-13 record and a 5.89 ERA in 25 starts. After that he was released from the team.

=== Kansas City Royals ===
In 2002, he signed a deal with the Kansas City Royals. Rekar only made 2 starts with the Royals, allowing 12 runs in those starts. After that, he was traded his former club the Rockies, for which he pitched on for the rest of that 2002 season.

=== Independent league ===
Rekar pitched for the Long Island Ducks for 2 years, compiling an 11–8 record.
