= Jeff Sparks =

American baseball player (born 1972)

- Pitcher
- Born: April 4, 1972 (age 53); Houston, Texas, U.S.
- Batted: Right Threw: Right

MLB debut
- September 12, 1999, for the Tampa Bay Devil Rays

Last MLB appearance
- May 17, 2000, for the Tampa Bay Devil Rays

MLB statistics
- Win–loss record: 0–1
- Earned run average: 4.15
- Strikeouts: 41
- Stats at Baseball Reference

Teams
- Tampa Bay Devil Rays (1999–2000)

James Jeffrey Sparks (born April 4, 1972) is an American former pitcher for the Major League Baseball Tampa Bay Devil Rays. Sparks never won an MLB game but did pick up one save. It came on September 27, 1999 against the New York Yankees. Sparks went 1 1/3rd innings to save a 10-6 Devil Rays victory.

As of May 2007, Sparks was selling home-and-garden products at Lowe's and attending firefighter school while training with former major league pitcher Mike Marshall.
