= Bobby Witt =

American baseball player (born 1964)

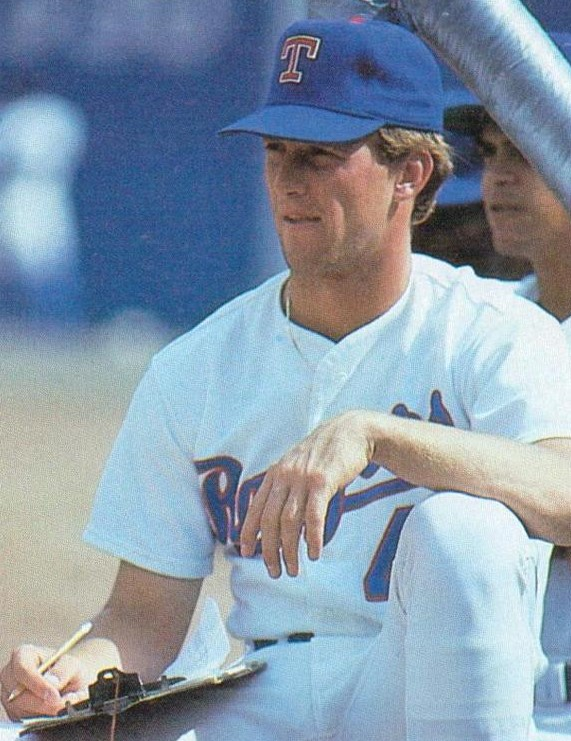
- Witt in 1986
- Pitcher
- Born: May 11, 1964 (age 62); Arlington, Virginia, U.S.
- Batted: Right Threw: Right

MLB debut
- April 10, 1986, for the Texas Rangers

Last MLB appearance
- October 7, 2001, for the Arizona Diamondbacks

MLB statistics
- Win–loss record: 142–157
- Earned run average: 4.83
- Strikeouts: 1,955
- Stats at Baseball Reference

Teams
- Texas Rangers (1986–1992); Oakland Athletics (1992–1994); Florida Marlins (1995); Texas Rangers (1995–1998); St. Louis Cardinals (1998); Tampa Bay Devil Rays (1999); Cleveland Indians (2000); Arizona Diamondbacks (2001)

Career highlights and awards
- World Series champion (2001)
Medals
Men's baseball
Representing United States
Olympic Games
Silver medal – second place	1984 Los Angeles	Team

Robert Andrew Witt Sr. (born May 11, 1964) is an American former professional baseball pitcher who played 16 seasons in Major League Baseball (MLB) for the Texas Rangers, Oakland Athletics, Florida Marlins, St. Louis Cardinals, Tampa Bay Devil Rays, Cleveland Indians, and Arizona Diamondbacks.

== Professional career ==
Witt attended the University of Oklahoma, and in 1983 he played collegiate summer baseball with the Chatham A's of the Cape Cod Baseball League. He was selected with the third pick of the first round by the Texas Rangers in 1985. His first MLB win came in 1986 with the Texas Rangers as he had failed to win a game in the minor leagues. He was known as a hard-throwing right-hander with control problems throughout his career and many in Arlington began to call him "Witt 'n Wild" as a play on the waterpark Wet 'n Wild, which was located next to Arlington Stadium. Witt led the league in walks three times and wild pitches twice.

=== Texas Rangers ===
Witt made his major league debut in 1986 and made 31 starts for the Rangers, finishing the season with an 11–9 record. Known for his control problems, he led the league with 143 walks in 157 2/3 innings pitched. The following season he led the league again in walks, this time with 140 in 143 innings.

On August 2, 1987, Witt struck out four batters in one inning. In 1990, he set the Texas Rangers club record with his seventh consecutive road win of the season, a feat that was not matched by a Rangers pitcher until Scott Feldman did it in 2009.

In 1990, he had the best season of his career, going 17–10 with a 3.36 ERA, the lowest of his career. He also established dominance, striking out 221 batters in 222 innings. He pitched for the Rangers until the 1992 season, when he was traded along with Jeff Russell and Rubén Sierra to division rival Oakland for Jose Canseco.

=== Oakland Athletics ===
From 1992 to 1994, Witt compiled a 23–24 record with the Oakland Athletics.

On June 23, 1994, Witt lost his bid for a perfect game when first base umpire Gary Cederstrom called the Kansas City Royals' Greg Gagne safe in the 6th inning on a close bunt play at first base. Replays showed that Gagne was out. Witt completed the game with only that one hit allowed and no walks.

=== Florida Marlins ===
After the 1994 season, Witt signed a one-year deal with the Florida Marlins. During the 1995 season, Witt pitched half a season with the Marlins before being traded to Texas. He finished his tenure with Florida with a 2–7 record despite having an ERA of 3.90 and a WHIP of under 1.40.

=== Texas Rangers (second stint) ===
From 1995 to 1998, Witt had a 36–32 record with Texas. His best season during this timeframe was in 1996, when he finished with a 16–12 record despite having an ERA of 5.41.

On June 30, 1997, he became the first American League pitcher to hit a home run since Roric Harrison on October 3, 1972, and the first American League pitcher to hit a home run in a regular season interleague game. His home run was hit off of Ismael Valdez of the Los Angeles Dodgers in the top of the sixth inning. The bat with which he hit this home run is now in the Baseball Hall of Fame.

=== St. Louis Cardinals ===
During the 1998 season, Witt was traded to St. Louis. He pitched with the Cardinals in 17 games, only five as a starter.

=== Tampa Bay Devil Rays ===
In 1999, Witt had one of his worst seasons of his career, going 7–15 with a 5.82 ERA in 32 starts for the Devil Rays.

=== Cleveland Indians ===
Due to injury, Witt was limited to seven appearances with the Indians in 2000, having pitched only 15 innings for the Tribe.

=== Arizona Diamondbacks ===
In 2001, his last season in MLB, Witt pitched in 14 games for the Arizona Diamondbacks, seven as a starter, and finished with a 4–1 record. Witt appeared in Game 2 of the 2001 National League Championship Series against Atlanta, pitching in the eighth inning. He went a third of an inning while allowing three hits and a run. His next pitching appearance was his first ever World Series game, and also his final major league game. It came in Game 6 of the 2001 World Series. He pitched the eighth inning in relief of Randy Johnson, with the Diamondbacks leading 15–2 over the New York Yankees. He walked one batter and finished by striking out Shane Spencer, before Troy Brohawn took over for the ninth inning. The Diamondbacks won the following game to win the World Series. After the World Series, Witt retired from baseball.

== Personal life ==
Witt grew up in Canton, Massachusetts, where his parents still reside, and attended Canton High School. As of April 2015, Witt lived in Colleyville, Texas, with his wife and four children and was a player agent. His son, Bobby Witt Jr., was drafted with the second pick of the 2019 Major League Baseball draft and signed with the Kansas City Royals. His daughter Nikki is married to ex-major leaguer James Russell, his daughter Kianna is married to ex-major leaguer Zach Neal, and his daughter Shaley is married to ex-major leaguer Cody Thomas.
