= Mike Trombley =

American baseball player (born 1967)

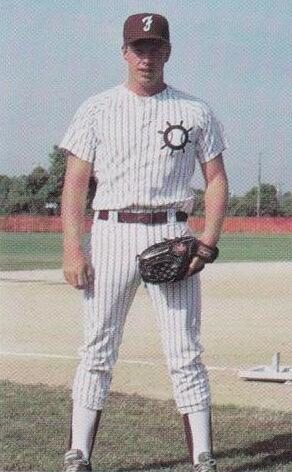
- Trombley with the Falmouth Commodores in 1988
- Pitcher
- Born: April 14, 1967 (age 59); Springfield, Massachusetts, U.S.
- Batted: Right Threw: Right

MLB debut
- August 19, 1992, for the Minnesota Twins

Last MLB appearance
- May 27, 2002, for the Minnesota Twins

MLB statistics
- Win–loss record: 37–47
- Earned run average: 4.48
- Strikeouts: 672
- Stats at Baseball Reference

Teams
- Minnesota Twins (1992–1999); Baltimore Orioles (2000–2001); Los Angeles Dodgers (2001); Minnesota Twins (2002)

Michael Scott Trombley (born April 14, 1967) is an American former professional baseball relief pitcher. During an 11-year major league career, Trombley pitched for the Minnesota Twins (1992–1999 and 2002), Baltimore Orioles (2000–2001) and Los Angeles Dodgers (2001).

== Education ==
Trombley attended Minnechaug Regional High School (1985) and Deerfield Academy (1986). He attended Duke University in Durham, North Carolina and graduated in 1990. In 1988, he played collegiate summer baseball with the Falmouth Commodores of the Cape Cod Baseball League.

== Professional career ==
=== Minnesota Twins ===
He was drafted in the 14th round by the Minnesota Twins in 1989. He made his major league debut for the Twins in 1992, with the team in a pennant race. He went 3-2 with a 3.30 ERA in 46 innings, which earned him the team's rookie of the year award. Trombley played with many well-known players in 1993, including Kirby Puckett, Rick Aguilera and Dave Winfield. Early in his career, Trombley gave up Indians designated hitter Eddie Murray's 3000th hit on June 30, 1995. He was sent to AAA for a short time, which drove him to start using a split finger fastball. In 1996, Trombley was recalled from AAA Salt Lake City to the Twins, and would be one of the most prominent relief pitchers in the league. He finished in the top six in appearances from 1998 through 2000. In 1999, when he was a free agent, Trombley posted 24 saves, which led to him signing a three-year deal with the Baltimore Orioles for $7.75 million. His departure left the Twins looking for a closer. The team had hoped to keep Trombley; Twins general manager Terry Ryan said, "That certainly puts a hole in the back end of our bullpen, so we're going to have to start making alternative plans.". Trombley pitched 634 innings for the Twins and ended his Twins career with 30 wins, 34 losses, and 34 saves.

=== Baltimore Orioles and Los Angeles Dodgers ===
Trombley played for the Baltimore Orioles for three years, until he was traded to the Los Angeles Dodgers in 2001. He would pitch for the Dodgers for one year and return for a short time for the Twins, before retiring in 2002.

== Post-Major League career ==
Currently, Mike and his wife Barbara are owners and managing partners of Trombley Associates in Wilbraham, MA. Trombley Associates is a full service financial planning company. They have three children, Tory, Kyle and Alexandra.
