= Eddie Gaillard =

American baseball player (born 1970)

- Pitcher
- Born: August 13, 1970 (age 56); Camden, New Jersey, U.S.
- Batted: Right Threw: Right

Professional debut
- MLB: August 11, 1997, for the Detroit Tigers
- NPB: April 14, 2000, for the Chunichi Dragons

Last appearance
- MLB: October 3, 1999, for the Tampa Bay Devil Rays
- NPB: May 22, 2004, for the Yokohama BayStars

MLB statistics
- Win–loss record: 2–0
- Earned run average: 4.66
- Strikeouts: 24

NPB statistics
- Win–loss record: 6–9
- Earned run average: 2.90
- Strikeouts: 141
- Stats at Baseball Reference

Teams
- Detroit Tigers (1997); Tampa Bay Devil Rays (1998–1999); Chunichi Dragons (2000–2003); Yokohama BayStars (2003–2004)

Julian Edward Gaillard (born August 13, 1970) is an American former pitcher in Major League Baseball, playing for the Detroit Tigers and Tampa Bay Devil Rays between 1997 and 1999. He also played in the Japanese Central League, posting a total of 120 saves during his five-season stay. He is noted as one of the premier closers of the Chunichi Dragons.

== Biography ==
Gaillard attended Forest Hill Community High School and Florida Southern College. In 1991, he played collegiate summer baseball with the Bourne Braves of the Cape Cod Baseball League. Gaillard was drafted by the Detroit Tigers in the 13th round of the 1993. He was promoted to the majors for the first time in 1997, and went to the Tampa Bay Devil Rays in 1998, and the Cincinnati Reds in 2000.

Gaillard joined the Chunichi Dragons in the Japanese Central League at the beginning of 2000. He took over the closing job that Korean pitcher Sun Dong-Yeol had left open after retiring, and led the league with 35 saves, appearing in the All-Star Game. However, he allowed the game-tying grand slam and walk-off home run back-to-back to the Yomiuri Giants, a first place team that was one win away from winning the league. He led the league in saves again in 2002, posting a 1.52 ERA.

In April 2003, he recorded his 100th save in only his 148th appearance, the fastest in the history of Japanese baseball. However, the Dragons began to use Akinori Otsuka as their closer, and he was put on waivers after complaining to the team about his lack of appearances. He was picked up by the Yokohama BayStars, but was demoted to relief duty after Kazuhiro Sasaki returned as the team's closer in 2004. He also sustained an injury to his pitching arm, and returned to the U.S. in June, 2004 for surgery. He signed a minor league contract with the Colorado Rockies in 2005, and with the Florida Marlins in 2006, but did not play in the majors.

His final stats in Japan were a 2.90 ERA and 120 saves.

== Pitching style ==
Gaillard's main weapon was his fastball, which fell in the mid 90 mph range during his prime. He threw a slider, splitter, and changeup to complement his fastball. He also had surprisingly good control, walking few batters in his appearances. He was one of the best closers in Japan in the early 2000s, ranking third among Chunichi Dragons players in saves, after Kaku Genji and Hitoki Iwase.

His name was originally written as ゲイラード, in Japan, but was changed to ギャラード, in order to match the English pronunciation.
