= Ramiro Mendoza =

Panamanian baseball player (born 1972)

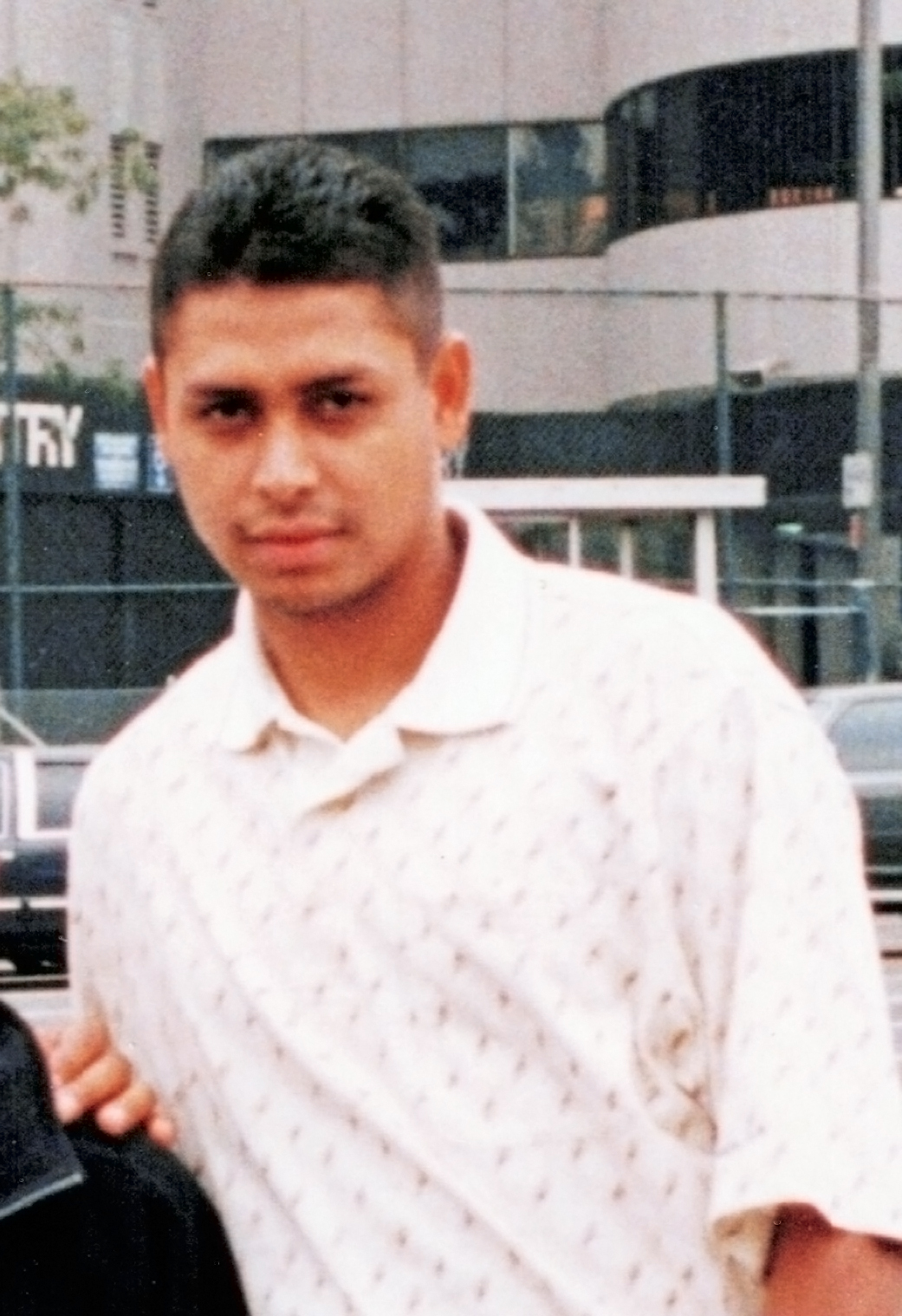
- Mendoza in 1999
- Pitcher
- Born: June 15, 1972 (age 54); Los Santos, Panama
- Batted: Right Threw: Right

MLB debut
- May 25, 1996, for the New York Yankees

Last MLB appearance
- September 1, 2005, for the New York Yankees

MLB statistics
- Win–loss record: 59–40
- Earned run average: 4.30
- Strikeouts: 463
- Stats at Baseball Reference

Teams
- New York Yankees (1996–2002); Boston Red Sox (2003–2004); New York Yankees (2005)

Career highlights and awards
- 3× World Series champion (1998, 1999, 2004)

Ramiro Mendoza (born June 15, 1972), nicknamed "El Brujo" (The Witch Doctor), is a Panamanian former Major League Baseball (MLB) pitcher. Mendoza played with the New York Yankees (1996–2002, 2005) and Boston Red Sox (2003–04). He batted and threw right-handed. Although Mendoza made 62 starts in his major league career, he was primarily known as a middle relief pitcher. He threw a sinker along with a slider, a four-seam fastball and a changeup. In Mendoza's ten seasons in the Major Leagues he was a part of five World Series champion teams.

== Major league career (1996–2005) ==
In a nine-year career, Mendoza compiled a 59–40 record with 463 strikeouts and a 4.30 earned run average in 797 innings pitched.

=== New York Yankees (1996–2002) ===
Mendoza made his major league debut in 1996, going 4–5 with a 6.79 ERA in his rookie season. He did not appear on the postseason roster. In 1997, Mendoza went 8–6 with a 4.24 ERA, while starting 15 games, as both a starter and a reliever. He also appeared in his first two postseason games in 1997, going 1–1 with an ERA of 2.45 while throwing 133 2/3 innings, a sharp increase from the 53 he pitched in 1996.

1998 was statistically Mendoza's best season, as he went 10–2 with an ERA of 3.25, both career bests. In the postseason, he pitched 4 1/3 scoreless innings against the Cleveland Indians over two games of the American League Championship Series. In the 1998 World Series against the San Diego Padres, Mendoza pitched one inning of two hit, one run, one strikeout ball in Game 3. He earned his second World Series ring when the Yankees swept the Padres.

The following year, Mendoza struggled to a 9–9 record with an ERA of 4.29 in 123 2/3 innings pitched. That year, he started only six games and was quickly moved to the bullpen. He gave up 68 runs that year, a career worst, and was left off of the roster for the 1999 American League Division Series. He rejoined the team for the Championship Series, where he pitched 2 1/3 innings and pickup up a save. In the World Series, he pitched 1 2/3 innings of relief and surrendered 3 hits and 2 runs, all earned, however, he still earned the win as the Yankees went on to sweep the Braves, 4–0.

Mendoza's performance improved slightly in 2000 as he went 7–4 with a 4.25 ERA in 65 2/3 innings pitched, including his first complete game since 1998, and last of his career. Despite his improved performance, he was left off of the postseason roster. The following year, he was 8–4 with a 3.75 ERA, and returned to the postseason. In the 2001 American League Division Series, he pitched in relief during three games and allowed only two hits with no runs allowed. In the Championship Series, he appeared in relief during three games and allowed one home run, (his only earned run in that series), pitching 5 1/3 innings to a 1.69 ERA. In the 2001 World Series, he pitched 2 2/3 innings of 1-hit ball as the Yankees fell to the Diamondbacks in seven games. In 2002, Mendoza pitched in 62 games to an identical 8–4 record with a slightly better ERA of 3.44. He pitched 1 1/3 innings in the 2002 American League Division Series against the Angels, surrendering only two earned runs as the Yankees were defeated three games to one. On October 28, 2002, his contract with the Yankees expired and he became a free agent. An unnamed source from the Yankees said that they were concerned about his work habits and conditioning. He was on the disabled list each of the past three seasons.

=== Boston Red Sox (2003–2004) ===
On December 30, 2002, Mendoza signed a two-year contract with the Boston Red Sox. On July 24, 2004, Mendoza pitched two hitless innings to pick up the win against his former team, the Yankees. The Red Sox were trailing 10–8 at the time, before winning the game, 11–10, in the bottom of the ninth.

Mendoza won another World Series ring with the Red Sox in 2004. He was included on the Red Sox roster in the 2004 American League Championship Series and made 2 appearances, getting tagged with the loss in Game 3.

=== Return to the Yankees (2005) ===
After recovering from shoulder surgery during the 2005 offseason, Mendoza returned to the Yankees after September 2005 callups, becoming one of three members of the 2004 Red Sox to play for the 2005 Yankees, along with Mark Bellhorn and Alan Embree. Mendoza's stint with the 2005 Yankees was limited to one inning, in which he gave up two hits, 2 earned runs, and recorded one strikeout. After the 2005 season, Mendoza signed a minor league contract with the Yankees.

== Later career (2006–2009) ==
He played for Panama in the 2006, 2009, and 2013 World Baseball Classics.

In February 2009, he signed a minor league contract with the Milwaukee Brewers and received an invitation to spring training, but departed spring training after failing a physical.

Following his release, he subsequently retired from major league baseball. He played for a season with the Newark Bears of the independent Atlantic League in 2009.
