= Justin Thompson (baseball) =

American baseball player (born 1973)

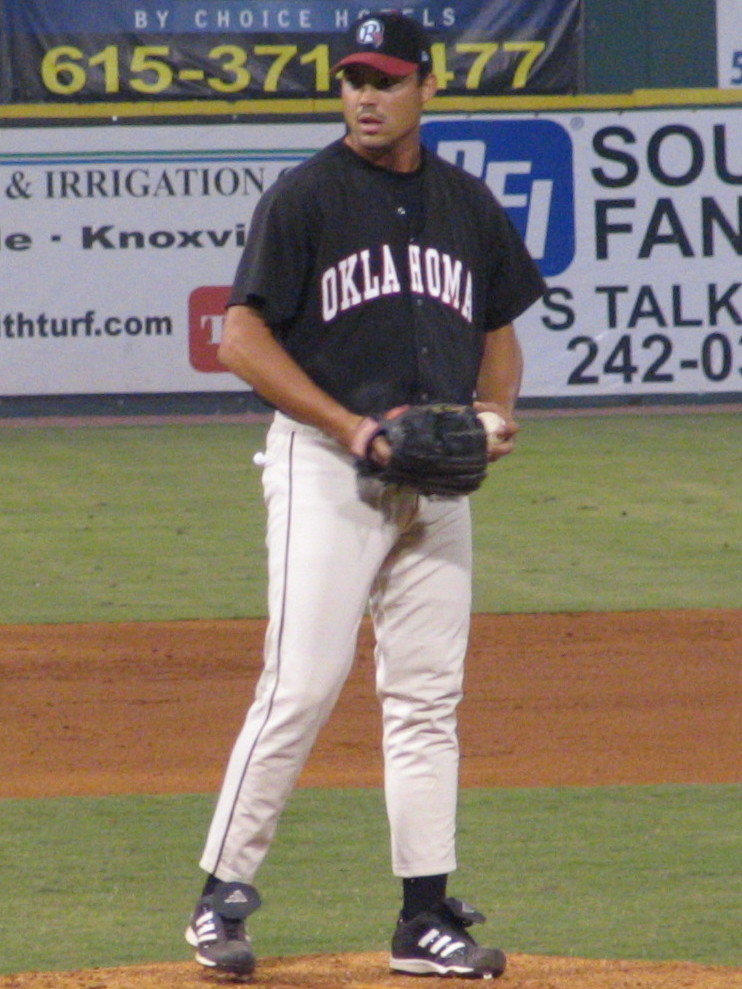
- Thompson pitching for the Oklahoma RedHawks in 2005
- Pitcher
- Born: March 8, 1973 (age 52); San Antonio, Texas, U.S.
- Batted: Left Threw: Left

MLB debut
- May 27, 1996, for the Detroit Tigers

Last MLB appearance
- August 25, 2005, for the Texas Rangers

MLB statistics
- Win–loss record: 36–43
- Earned run average: 4.02
- Strikeouts: 428

Teams
- Detroit Tigers (1996–1999); Texas Rangers (2005)

Career highlights and awards
- All-Star (1997)

Justin Ray Thompson (born March 8, 1973) is an American former Major League Baseball pitcher who played for the Detroit Tigers from 1996 to 1999 and the Texas Rangers in 2005.

== Career ==
Thompson was drafted out of high school in the first round of the 1991 MLB draft and started his career in Detroit Tigers minor league system. Thompson started his professional career with the rookie-level Bristol Tigers of the Appalachian League in 1991. Thompson moved up to Class A the next year joining the South Atlantic League's Fayetteville Generals in 1992. In 1993, Thompson split time in Class A and Double-A, playing with the Lakeland Tigers of the Florida State League and the Eastern League's London Tigers.

Thompson made his major-league debut in 1996. He was selected to the American League (AL) All-Star team in 1997, at the age of 24, during a season in which he won 15 games and finished fifth in the AL with a 3.02 ERA. He continued to pitch well in 1998, finishing second in the AL in games started, with 34. Injury problems, however, derailed his 1999 season.

Thompson was traded by the Tigers to the Texas Rangers in an eight-player trade after the 1999 season that involved Juan González being sent to Detroit. Thompson spent six seasons in Minor League Baseball with the Rangers organization, including a missed 2001 season due to a torn rotator cuff suffered in 2000, before playing in MLB again for two games in 2005. Thompson elected free agency after the 2005 season and subsequently signed a minor-league contract with the Milwaukee Brewers in December 2005. In May 2006, Thompson retired after playing eight games for Milwaukee's Triple-A affiliate, the Nashville Sounds.
