= 1999 Boston Red Sox season =

Major League Baseball season

1999 Boston Red Sox
- American League Wild Card winners
- League: American League
- Division: East
- Ballpark: Fenway Park
- City: Boston, Massachusetts
- Record: 94–68 (.580)
- Divisional place: 2nd
- Owners: JRY Trust
- President: John Harrington
- General manager: Dan Duquette
- Manager: Jimy Williams
- Television: WLVI-TV (Sean McDonough, Jerry Remy); NESN (Bob Kurtz, Jerry Remy)
- Radio: WEEI (Jerry Trupiano, Joe Castiglione); WRCA (Bobby Serrano, Hector Martinez, Juan Pedro Villamán)
- Stats: ESPN.com; Baseball Reference

The 1999 Boston Red Sox season was the 99th season in the franchise's Major League Baseball history. The Red Sox finished second in the American League East with a record of 94–68, four games behind the New York Yankees, who went on to win the World Series. The Red Sox qualified for the postseason as the AL wild card, and defeated the American League Central champion Cleveland Indians in the ALDS. The Red Sox then lost to the Yankees in the ALCS. The Red Sox hosted the All-Star Game on July 13.

Pedro Martínez won the American League Cy Young Award, becoming the second pitcher to win the award in both leagues. Additionally, Jimy Williams was named the American League Manager of the Year.

== Offseason ==
- November 16, 1998: José Offerman was signed as a free agent by the Red Sox.
- November 20, 1998: Purchased Tomo Ohka from the Yokohama Bay Stars.
- December 11, 1998: Mark Portugal was signed as a free agent by the Red Sox.
- December 18, 1998: Brian Daubach was signed as a free agent by the Red Sox.
- December 19, 1998: Mark Guthrie was signed as a free agent by the Red Sox.
- January 11, 1999: Pat Rapp was signed as a free agent by the Red Sox.
- March 11, 1999: Ramón Martínez was signed as a free agent by the Red Sox.
- March 30, 1999: Midre Cummings was released by the Red Sox.

== Regular season ==
=== Season standings ===
AL East
Team	W	L	Pct.	GB	Home	Road
New York Yankees	98	64	.605	—	48‍–‍33	50‍–‍31
Boston Red Sox	94	68	.580	4	49‍–‍32	45‍–‍36
Toronto Blue Jays	84	78	.519	14	40‍–‍41	44‍–‍37
Baltimore Orioles	78	84	.481	20	41‍–‍40	37‍–‍44
Tampa Bay Devil Rays	69	93	.426	29	33‍–‍48	36‍–‍45

=== Record vs. opponents ===
1999 American League record Source: MLB Standings Grid – 1999
Team	ANA	BAL	BOS	CWS	CLE	DET	KC	MIN	NYY	OAK	SEA	TB	TEX	TOR	NL
Anaheim	—	3–9	1–9	5–5	1–9	5–5	7–5	6–4	6–4	8–4	6–6	7–5	6–6	3–9	6–12
Baltimore	9–3	—	5–7	7–3	1–9	5–5	6–4	8–1	4–9	5–7	5–5	5–7	6–6	1–11	11–7
Boston	9–1	7–5	—	7–5	8–4	7–5	8–2	6–4	8–4	4–6	7–3	4–9	4–5	9–3	6–12
Chicago	5–5	3–7	5–7	—	3–9	7–5	6–6	8–3–1	5–7	3–7	4–8	6–4	5–5	6–4	9–9
Cleveland	9–1	9–1	4–8	9–3	—	8–5	7–5	9–3	3–7	10–2	7–3	5–4	3–7	5–7	9–9
Detroit	5–5	5–5	5–7	5–7	5–8	—	7–4	6–6	5–7	4–6	3–7	4–5	5–5	2–10	8–10
Kansas City	5–7	4–6	2–8	6–6	5–7	4–7	—	5–8	5–4	6–6	7–5	2–8	4–6	3–7	6–12
Minnesota	4–6	1–8	4–6	3–8–1	3–9	6–6	8–5	—	4–6	7–5	4–8	5–5	0–12	4–6	10–7
New York	4–6	9–4	4–8	7–5	7–3	7–5	4–5	6–4	—	6–4	9–1	8–4	8–4	10–2	9–9
Oakland	4–8	7–5	6–4	7–3	2–10	6–4	6–6	5–7	4–6	—	6–6	9–1	5–7	8–2	12–6
Seattle	6–6	5–5	3–7	8–4	3–7	7–3	5–7	8–4	1–9	6–6	—	8–4	5–8	7–2	7–11
Tampa Bay	5–7	7–5	9–4	4–6	4–5	5–4	8–2	5–5	4–8	1–9	4–8	—	4–8	5–8	4–14
Texas	6–6	6–6	5–4	5–5	7–3	5–5	6–4	12–0	4–8	7–5	8–5	8–4	—	6–4	10–8
Toronto	9–3	11–1	3–9	4–6	7–5	10–2	7–3	6–4	2–10	2–8	2–7	8–5	4–6	—	9–9

Red Sox vs. National League East
Team	ATL	FLA	MON	NYM	PHI
Boston	2–4	2–1	0–3	1–2	1–2

=== Opening Day Lineup ===
30	José Offerman	DH
20	Darren Lewis	CF
13	John Valentin	3B
5	Nomar Garciaparra	SS
25	Troy O'Leary	LF
24	Mike Stanley	1B
10	Scott Hatteberg	C
3	Jeff Frye	2B
7	Trot Nixon	RF
45	Pedro Martínez	P

=== All-Star Game ===
The 1999 Major League Baseball All-Star Game was the 70th playing of the midsummer classic between the all-stars of the American League (AL) and National League (NL). Red Sox legend Ted Williams threw the ceremonial first pitch. Three members of the Red Sox played in the game. Pitcher Pedro Martínez and shortstop Nomar Garciaparra were starters, while second baseman José Offerman was a reserve. The game, won by the American League 4–1, was held on July 13, 1999, at Fenway Park.

=== Notable transactions ===
- June 2, 1999: Casey Fossum was drafted by the Red Sox in the 1st Round of the 1999 Major League Baseball draft. Player signed July 19, 1999.
- June 2, 1999: Lew Ford was drafted by the Red Sox in the 12th round of the 1999 Major League Baseball draft. Player signed June 7, 1999.
- July 26, 1999: Robert Ramsay was traded by the Red Sox to the Seattle Mariners for Butch Huskey.
- July 31, 1999: Mike Maroth was traded by the Red Sox to the Detroit Tigers for Bryce Florie.
- August 24, 1999: Dave Benham and Mike Matthews were traded by the Red Sox to the St. Louis Cardinals for Kent Mercker.
- August 31, 1999: Mark Guthrie and a player to be named later (Cole Liniak) were traded by the Red Sox to the Chicago Cubs for Rod Beck.
- September 27, 1999: Mark Portugal was released by the Red Sox.

=== Roster ===
1999 Boston Red Sox
Roster
Pitchers: 57,47 Rod Beck; 33 Kirk Bullinger; 61 Cho Jin-ho; 37 Rhéal Cormier; 41 Jim Corsi; 39 Bryce Florie; 34 Rich Garcés; 36 Tom Gordon; 27 Kip Gross; 40 Mark Guthrie; 56 Tim Harikkala; 32 Derek Lowe; 45 Pedro Martínez; 48 Ramón Martínez; 41 Kent Mercker; 53 Tomo Ohka; 57 Juan Peña; 31 Mark Portugal; 28 Pat Rapp; 19 Brian Rose; 17 Bret Saberhagen; 62 Marino Santana; 49 Tim Wakefield; 46 John Wasdin; 29 Bob Wolcott	Catchers: 39 Creighton Gubanich; 10 Scott Hatteberg; 56 Steve Lomasney; 47,33 Jason Varitek; 38 Lenny Webster; Infielders: 23 Brian Daubach; 50 Chad Fonville; 3 Jeff Frye; 5 Nomar Garciaparra; 18 Reggie Jefferson; 26 Lou Merloni; 30 José Offerman; 15 Donnie Sadler; 24 Mike Stanley; 13 John Valentin; 38 Wilton Veras	Outfielders: 2 Damon Buford; 40 Michael Coleman; 44 Butch Huskey; 20 Darren Lewis; 7 Trot Nixon; 29 Jon Nunnally; 25 Troy O'Leary	Manager: 22 Jimy Williams; Coaches: 52 John Cumberland (Bullpen); 43 Dave Jauss (First base); 16 Joe Kerrigan (Pitching); 60 Dana LeVangie (Bullpen catcher); 12 Wendell Kim (Third base); 35 Grady Little (Bench); 14 Jim Rice (Hitting)

== Player statistics ==
=== Batting ===
==== Starters by position ====
Note: Pos = Position; G = Games played; AB = At bats; H = Hits; Avg. = Batting average; HR = Home runs; RBI = Runs batted in

Pos	Player	G	AB	H	Avg.	HR	RBI
C	Jason Varitek	144	483	130	.269	20	76
1B	Mike Stanley	136	427	120	.281	19	72
2B	José Offerman	149	586	172	.294	8	69
SS	Nomar Garciaparra	135	532	190	.357	27	104
3B	John Valentin	113	450	114	.253	12	70
LF	Troy O'Leary	157	596	167	.280	28	103
CF	Darren Lewis	135	470	113	.240	2	40
RF	Trot Nixon	124	381	103	.270	15	52
DH	Reggie Jefferson	83	206	57	.277	5	17

==== Other batters ====
Note: G = Games played; AB = At bats; H = Hits; Avg. = Batting average; HR = Home runs; RBI = Runs batted in

Player	G	AB	H	Avg.	HR	RBI
Damon Buford	91	297	72	.242	6	38
Michael Coleman	2	5	1	.200	0	0
Brian Daubach	110	381	112	.294	21	73
Chad Fonville	3	2	0	.000	0	0
Jeff Frye	41	114	32	.281	1	12
Creighton Gubanich	18	47	13	.277	1	11
Scott Hatteberg	30	80	22	.275	1	11
Butch Huskey	45	124	33	.266	7	28
Steve Lomasney	1	2	0	.000	0	0
Lou Merloni	43	126	32	.254	1	13
Jon Nunnally	10	14	4	.286	0	1
Donnie Sadler	49	107	30	.280	0	4
Wilton Veras	36	118	34	.288	2	13
Lenny Webster	6	14	0	.000	0	1

=== Pitching ===
==== Starting rotation ====
Note: G = Games pitched (GS) = Games started; IP = Innings pitched; W = Wins; L = Losses; ERA = Earned run average; SO = Strikeouts

Player	G (GS)	IP	W	L	ERA	SO
Pedro Martínez	31 (29)	213.1	23	4	2.07	303
Mark Portugal	31 (27)	150.1	7	12	5.51	79
Pat Rapp	37 (26)	146.1	6	7	4.12	90
Bret Saberhagen	22 (22)	119.0	10	6	2.95	81
Brian Rose	22 (18)	98.0	7	6	4.87	51

==== Relief, spot starters, and other pitchers ====
Note: G = Games pitched (GS) = Games started; IP = Innings pitched; W = Wins; L = Losses; SV = Saves; ERA = Earned run average; SO = Strikeouts

Player	G (GS)	IP	W	L	SV	ERA	SO
Tim Wakefield	49 (17)	140.0	6	11	15	5.08	104
Derek Lowe	74 (0)	109.1	6	3	15	2.63	80
John Wasdin	45 (0)	74.1	8	3	2	4.12	57
Rhéal Cormier	60 (0)	63.1	2	0	0	3.69	39
Mark Guthrie	46 (0)	46.1	1	1	2	5.83	36
Rich Garcés	30 (0)	40.2	5	1	2	1.55	33
Jin Ho Cho	9 (7)	39.1	2	3	0	5.72	16
Bryce Florie	14 (2)	30.0	2	0	0	4.80	25
Kent Mercker	5 (5)	25.2	2	0	0	3.51	17
Jim Corsi	23 (0)	24.0	1	2	0	5.25	14
Ramón Martínez	4 (4)	20.2	2	1	0	3.05	15
Tom Gordon	21 (0)	17.2	0	2	11	5.60	24
Rod Beck	12 (0)	14.0	0	1	3	1.93	12
Tim Harikkala	7 (0)	13.0	1	1	0	6.23	7
Juan Peña	2 (2)	13.0	2	0	0	0.69	15
Tomo Ohka	8 (2)	13.0	1	2	0	6.23	8
Kip Gross	11 (1)	12.2	0	2	0	7.82	9
Bob Wolcott	4 (0)	6.2	0	0	0	8.10	2
Marino Santana	3 (0)	4.0	0	0	0	15.75	4
Kirk Bullinger	4 (0)	2.0	0	0	0	4.50	0

== Playoffs ==
=== Division Series ===
Boston wins the series, 3-2

Game	Home	Score	Visitor	Score	Date	Series
1	Cleveland	3	Boston	2	October 6	1–0 (CLE)
2	Cleveland	11	Boston	1	October 7	2–0 (CLE)
3	Boston	9	Cleveland	3	October 9	2–1 (CLE)
4	Boston	23	Cleveland	7	October 10	2–2
5	Cleveland	8	Boston	12	October 11	3–2 (BOS)

=== League Championship Series ===
New York wins the series, 4-1

Game	Home	Score	Visitor	Score	Date	Series
1	New York	4	Boston	3	October 13	1–0 (NYY)
2	New York	3	Boston	2	October 14	2–0 (NYY)
3	Boston	13	New York	1	October 16	2–1 (NYY)
4	Boston	2	New York	9	October 17	3–1 (NYY)
5	Boston	1	New York	6	October 18	4–1 (NYY)

== Game log ==
Red Sox Win	Red Sox Loss	Game postponed	Clinched Playoff Spot

1999 Boston Red Sox Season Game Log: 94–68 (Home: 49–32; Away: 45–36)
April: 11–11

#	Date	Opponent	Score	Win	Loss	Save	Stadium	Attendance	Record	Streak
1	April 5	@ Royals	5–3	P. Martínez (1–0)	Appier (0–1)	Gordon (1)	Kauffman Stadium	40,257	1–0	W1
2	April 7	@ Royals	6–0	Saberhagen (1–0)	Rosado (0–1)	—	Kauffman Stadium	13,903	2–0	W2
3	April 8	@ Royals	4–1	Wakefield (1–0)	Suppan (0–1)	Gordon (2)	Kauffman Stadium	13,356	3–0	W3
4	April 9	@ Devil Rays	4–1	Portugal (1–0)	Arrojo (0–1)	—	Tropicana Field	40,525	4–0	W4
5	April 10	@ Devil Rays	5–3	P. Martínez (2–0)	Santana (0–1)	Gordon (3)	Tropicana Field	28,552	5–0	W5
6	April 11	@ Devil Rays	4–5	Aldred (1–0)	Lowe (0–1)	Hernández (2)	Tropicana Field	23,404	5–1	L1
7	April 13	White Sox	6–0	Saberhagen (2–0)	Parque (1–1)	—	Fenway Park	31,874	6–1	W1
8	April 15	White Sox	0–4	Snyder (1–1)	P. Martínez (2–1)	—	Fenway Park	22,461	6–2	L1
9	April 16	Devil Rays	6–2	Rekar (1–0)	Wakefield (1–1)	—	Fenway Park	18,809	6–3	L2
10	April 17	Devil Rays	8–5	Portugal (2–0)	Saunders (1–2)	—	Fenway Park	26,799	7–3	W1
11	April 18	Devil Rays	1–5	Witt (2–0)	Rapp (0–1)	—	Fenway Park	27,589	7–4	L1
12	April 19	Devil Rays	5–4	Arrojo (1–1)	Saberhagen (2–1)	Hernández (4)	Fenway Park	33,167	7–5	L2
13	April 20	@ Tigers	1–0	P. Martínez (3–1)	Weaver (1–1)	Lowe (1)	Tiger Stadium	12,558	8–5	W1
14	April 21	@ Tigers	2–9	Moehler (2–2)	Wakefield (1–2)	—	Tiger Stadium	13,049	8–6	L1
15	April 22	@ Tigers	0–1	Thompson (2–2)	Portugal (2–1)	Jones (2)	Tiger Stadium	32,975	8–7	L2
16	April 23	Indians	6–7	Karsay (2–1)	Corsi (0–1)	Jackson (3)	Fenway Park	29,921	8–8	L3
17	April 24	Indians	9–4	Harikkala (1–0)	DeLucia (0–1)	—	Fenway Park	29,481	9–8	W1
18	April 25	Indians	3–2	P. Martínez (4–1)	Shuey (2–1)	—	Fenway Park	30,472	10–8	W2
19	April 26	@ Twins	2–6	Radke (2–2)	Wakefield (1–3)	Trombley (1)	Metrodome	9,674	10–9	L1
20	April 27	@ Twins	5–6	Guardado (1–1)	Corsi (0–2)	Aguilera (4)	Metrodome	10,681	10–10	L2
21	April 28	@ Twins	9–4	Rapp (1–1)	Lincoln (0–4)	—	Metrodome	11,097	11–10	W1
22	April 30	@ Athletics	9–13	Mathews (3–0)	Lowe (0–2)	—	Network Associates Coliseum	10,063	11–11	L1

May: 20–8

#	Date	Opponent	Score	Win	Loss	Save	Stadium	Attendance	Record	Streak
23	May 1	@ Athletics	7–2	P. Martínez (5–1)	Heredia (1–2)	—	Network Associates Coliseum	30,353	12–11	W1
24	May 2	@ Athletics	5–7	Jones (1–0)	Harikkala (1–1)	Taylor (6)	Network Associates Coliseum	17,388	12–12	L1
25	May 3	@ Athletics	11–12 (10)	Mathews (4–0)	Gross (0–1)	—	Network Associates Coliseum	8,221	12–13	L2
26	May 5	Rangers	3–8	Helling (3–3)	Rapp (1–2)	—	Fenway Park	20,960	12–14	L3
27	May 6	Rangers	3–2	Cormier (1–0)	Sele (3–3)	Wakefield (1)	Fenway Park	21,412	13–14	W1
28	May 7	Angels	6–0	P. Martínez (6–1)	Olivares (3–3)	—	Fenway Park	32,220	14–14	W2
29	May 8	Angels	6–1	Peña (1–0)	Belcher (1–3)	Lowe (2)	Fenway Park	29,385	15–14	W3
30	May 9	Angels	4–2	Portugal (3–1)	Hill (1–2)	Wakefield (2)	Fenway Park	23,710	16–14	W4
31	May 10	Mariners	12–4	Wasdin (1–0)	Hinchliffe (0–2)	—	Fenway Park	21,660	17–14	W5
32	May 11	Mariners	5–8	Moyer (2–4)	Wakefield (1–4)	—	Fenway Park	24,416	17–15	L1
33	May 12	Mariners	9–2	P. Martínez (7–1)	Suzuki (0–2)	—	Fenway Park	28,177	18–15	W1
34	May 14	@ Blue Jays	5–0	Peña (2–0)	Wells (4–3)	—	SkyDome	22,186	19–15	W2
35	May 15	@ Blue Jays	6–5	Wasdin (2–0)	Plesac (0–3)	Gordon (4)	SkyDome	24,579	20–15	W3
36	May 16	@ Blue Jays	6–9	Lloyd (3–1)	Gross (0–2)	—	SkyDome	21,094	20–16	L1
37	May 17	@ Blue Jays	8–7	Wasdin (3–0)	Lloyd (3–2)	—	SkyDome	20,395	21–16	W1
38	May 18	Yankees	6–3	P. Martínez (8–1)	Cone (4–2)	Gordon (5)	Fenway Park	33,620	22–16	W2
39	May 19	Yankees	6–0	Rose (1–0)	Irabu (1–2)	—	Fenway Park	32,091	23–16	W3
40	May 20	Yankees	1–3	Hernández (4–4)	Portugal (3–2)	Rivera (11)	Fenway Park	33,139	23–17	L1
41	May 21	Blue Jays	5–2	Rapp (2–2)	Escobar (3–2)	—	Fenway Park	27,284	24–17	W1
42	May 22	Blue Jays	6–4	Wakefield (2–4)	Carpenter (3–4)	Gordon (6)	Fenway Park	32,038	25–17	W2
43	May 23	Blue Jays	10–8	P. Martínez (9–1)	Hentgen (4–2)	Gordon (7)	Fenway Park	28,559	26–17	W3
—	May 24	@ Yankees	Postponed (rain). Makeup date May 27.							
44	May 25	@ Yankees	5–2	Rose (2–0)	Irabu (1–3)	Gordon (8)	Yankee Stadium	37,715	27–17	W4
45	May 26	@ Yankees	3–8	Hernández (5–4)	Portugal (3–3)	Rivera (12)	Yankee Stadium	45,800	27–18	L1
46	May 27	@ Yankees	1–4	Clemens (4–0)	Rapp (2–3)	Rivera (13)	Yankee Stadium	55,671	27–19	L2
47	May 28	@ Indians	12–5	Wakefield (3–4)	Wright (4–3)	Lowe (3)	Jacobs Field	43,287	28–19	W1
48	May 29	@ Indians	4–2	P. Martínez (10–1)	Colón (6–2)	Gordon (9)	Jacobs Field	43,255	29–19	W2
49	May 30	@ Indians	4–2	Rose (3–0)	Gooden (2–2)	Gordon (10)	Jacobs Field	43,207	30–19	W3
50	May 31	Tigers	8–7	Wasdin (4–0)	Anderson (1–1)	Gordon (11)	Fenway Park	27,883	31–19	W4

June: 14–13

#	Date	Opponent	Score	Win	Loss	Save	Stadium	Attendance	Record	Streak
51	June 1	Tigers	5–4	Wasdin (5–0)	Brocail (1–2)	Lowe (4)	Fenway Park	26,456	32–19	W5
52	June 2	Tigers	2–4	Thompson (5–6)	Wakefield (3–5)	Jones (9)	Fenway Park	22,194	32–20	L1
53	June 4	Braves	5–1	P. Martínez (11–1)	Glavine (3–7)	—	Fenway Park	33,411	33–20	W1
54	June 5	Braves	5–6	Maddux (5–3)	Gordon (0–1)	Rocker (11)	Fenway Park	32,793	33–21	L1
55	June 6	Braves	2–3 (10)	Seánez (4–0)	Portugal (3–4)	Rocker (12)	Fenway Park	32,184	33–22	L2
56	June 7	@ Expos	2–8	Pavano (4–5)	Saberhagen (2–2)	—	Olympic Stadium	7,003	33–23	L3
57	June 8	@ Expos	1–5	Smith (1–0)	Wakefield (3–6)	—	Olympic Stadium	7,233	33–24	L4
58	June 9	@ Expos	1–13	Thurman (2–3)	P. Martínez (11–2)	—	Olympic Stadium	19,012	33–25	L5
59	June 11	@ Mets	3–2 (12)	Corsi (1–2)	Franco (0–2)	Wasdin (1)	Shea Stadium	36,700	34–25	W1
60	June 12	@ Mets	2–4	Leiter (4–5)	Rapp (2–4)	Franco (15)	Shea Stadium	43,819	34–26	L1
61	June 13	@ Mets	4–5	Hershiser (6–5)	Portugal (3–5)	Wendell (2)	Shea Stadium	46,473	34–27	L2
62	June 14	Twins	4–3	Wasdin (6–0)	Trombley (1–3)	—	Fenway Park	30,099	35–27	W1
63	June 15	Twins	4–2	P. Martínez (12–2)	Milton (2–6)	Wakefield (3)	Fenway Park	31,805	36–27	W2
64	June 16	Twins	5–1	Rose (4–0)	Perkins (1–4)	Guthrie (1)	Fenway Park	30,085	37–27	W3
65	June 17	Twins	7–8	Hawkins (3–7)	Rapp (2–5)	Trombley (8)	Fenway Park	31,446	37–28	L1
66	June 18	Rangers	1–4	Morgan (7–5)	Portugal (3–6)	Zimmerman (1)	Fenway Park	31,427	37–29	L2
67	June 19	Rangers	7–4	Cho (1–0)	Clark (3–7)	Wakefield (4)	Fenway Park	31,950	38–29	W1
68	June 20	Rangers	5–2	P. Martínez (13–2)	Glynn (0–2)	Wakefield (5)	Fenway Park	31,501	39–29	W2
69	June 21	Rangers	5–4	Wasdin (7–0)	Helling (6–7)	Wakefield (6)	Fenway Park	27,627	40–29	W3
70	June 22	@ Orioles	3–5	Rhodes (3–2)	Guthrie (0–1)	Timlin (9)	Camden Yards	43,329	40–30	L1
71	June 23	@ Orioles	5–0	Saberhagen (3–2)	Guzmán (3–6)	—	Camden Yards	45,086	41–30	W1
72	June 24	@ Orioles	2–1	Portugal (4–6)	Mussina (9–4)	Wakefield (7)	Camden Yards	47,388	42–30	W2
73	June 25	White Sox	6–1	Cho (2–0)	Snyder (7–6)	—	Fenway Park	31,097	43–30	W3
74	June 26	White Sox	17–1	P. Martínez (14–2)	Baldwin (3–8)	Wasdin (2)	Fenway Park	32,758	44–30	W4
75	June 27	White Sox	6–7	Simas (2–2)	Wakefield (3–7)	—	Fenway Park	30,627	44–31	L1
76	June 28	White Sox	14–1	Saberhagen (4–2)	Sirotka (6–8)	—	Fenway Park	24,616	45–31	W1
77	June 30	Devil Rays	10–11 (10)	Hernández (1–3)	Wasdin (7–1)	—	Fenway Park	27,961	45–32	L1

July: 11–15

#	Date	Opponent	Score	Win	Loss	Save	Stadium	Attendance	Record	Streak
78	July 1	Devil Rays	3–12	Álvarez (4–5)	Cho (2–1)	—	Fenway Park	29,270	45–33	L1
79	July 2	@ White Sox	6–1	P. Martínez (15–2)	Parque (8–6)	—	Comiskey Park	23,226	46–33	W1
80	July 3	@ White Sox	2–11	Sirotka (7–8)	Rose (4–1)	—	Comiskey Park	18,028	46–34	L1
81	July 4	@ White Sox	5–2	Saberhagen (5–2)	Navarro (6–7)	Wakefield (8)	Comiskey Park	16,495	47–34	W1
82	July 5	@ Devil Rays	4–2	Portugal (5–6)	Rekar (5–4)	Wakefield (9)	Tropicana Field	21,967	48–34	W2
83	July 6	@ Devil Rays	4–6	Lopez (1–1)	Wasdin (7–2)	Hernández (23)	Tropicana Field	17,309	48–35	L1
84	July 7	@ Devil Rays	2–3	Eiland (1–4)	P. Martínez (15–3)	Hernández (24)	Tropicana Field	20,959	48–36	L2
85	July 8	@ Devil Rays	2–3	Witt (5–5)	Rose (4–2)	Hernández (25)	Tropicana Field	21,160	48–37	L3
86	July 9	@ Braves	5–4	Saberhagen (6–2)	Chen (0–1)	Wakefield (10)	Turner Field	49,636	49–37	W1
87	July 10	@ Braves	1–2 (11)	Seánez (5–0)	Wasdin (7–3)	—	Turner Field	47,871	49–38	L1
88	July 11	@ Braves	1–8	Maddux (10–5)	Cho (2–2)	—	Turner Field	46,680	49–39	L2
89	July 15	Phillies	6–4	Rose (5–2)	Byrd (11–6)	Wakefield (11)	Fenway Park	32,397	50–39	W1
90	July 16	Phillies	4–5	Person (3–4)	Saberhagen (6–3)	Gomes (13)	Fenway Park	32,899	50–40	L1
91	July 17	Phillies	3–11	Wolf (5–0)	Portugal (5–7)	—	Fenway Park	32,228	50–41	L2
92	July 18	Marlins	11–9	Lowe (1–2)	Núñez (3–3)	Wakefield (12)	Fenway Park	30,288	51–41	W1
93	July 19	Marlins	7–10	Meadows (7–10)	Ohka (0–1)	Alfonseca (4)	Fenway Park	23,282	51–42	L1
94	July 20	Marlins	7–1	Rose (6–2)	Hernández (5–9)	—	Fenway Park	25,346	52–42	W1
95	July 21	Orioles	1–6	Mussina (13–4)	Saberhagen (6–4)	—	Fenway Park	33,690	52–43	L1
96	July 22	Orioles	2–5	Erickson (6–8)	Cho (2–3)	Timlin (10)	Fenway Park	33,384	52–44	L2
97	July 23	@ Tigers	5–14	Moehler (8–9)	Ohka (0–2)	—	Tiger Stadium	35,245	52–45	L3
98	July 24	@ Tigers	11–4	Portugal (6–7)	Weaver (6–6)	Lowe (5)	Tiger Stadium	37,149	53–45	W1
99	July 25	@ Tigers	1–9	Mlicki (5–10)	Rose (6–3)	—	Tiger Stadium	34,959	53–46	L1
100	July 27	@ Blue Jays	11–9	Guthrie (1–1)	Halladay (7–4)	Wakefield (13)	SkyDome	38,631	54–46	W1
101	July 28	@ Blue Jays	8–0	Rapp (3–5)	Hamilton (3–6)	—	SkyDome	36,190	55–46	W2
102	July 30	Yankees	3–13	Irabu (8–3)	Portugal (6–8)	—	Fenway Park	33,777	55–47	L1
103	July 31	Yankees	6–5	Lowe (2–2)	Mendoza (4–7)	—	Fenway Park	33,179	56–47	W1

August: 18–11

#	Date	Opponent	Score	Win	Loss	Save	Stadium	Attendance	Record	Streak
104	August 1	Yankees	5–4	Saberhagen (7–4)	Hernández (12–7)	Wakefield (13)	Fenway Park	33,553	57–47	W2
105	August 2	Indians	5–7	Karsay (8–1)	Garcés (0–1)	Jackson (23)	Fenway Park	33,218	57–48	L1
106	August 3	Indians	4–5	Shuey (7–4)	Wakefield (3–8)	Jackson (24)	Fenway Park	33,650	57–49	L2
107	August 4	Indians	7–2	Portugal (7–8)	Colón (10–4)	—	Fenway Park	33,282	58–49	W1
108	August 5	@ Angels	0–8	Finley (6–10)	Rose (6–4)	—	Edison Field	26,175	58–50	L1
109	August 6	@ Angels	5–1	Saberhagen (8–4)	Sparks (5–8)	—	Edison Field	36,360	59–50	W1
110	August 7	@ Angels	14–3	Rapp (4–5)	Belcher (5–7)	—	Edison Field	36,577	60–50	W2
111	August 8	@ Angels	9–3	P. Martínez (16–3)	McDowell (0–4)	—	Edison Field	31,664	61–50	W3
112	August 9	@ Royals	2–5	Suppan (7–6)	Portugal (7–9)	—	Kauffman Stadium	18,248	61–51	L1
113	August 10	@ Royals	9–6 (10)	Wakefield (4–8)	Wakefield (6–7)	Garcés (1)	Kauffman Stadium	15,909	62–51	W1
114	August 11	@ Royals	9–3	Saberhagen (9–4)	Rosado (7–9)	—	Kauffman Stadium	15,157	63–51	W2
115	August 13	Mariners	11–6	Lowe (3–2)	Fassero (4–14)	—	Fenway Park	33,653	64–51	W3
116	August 14	Mariners	13–2	P. Martínez (17–3)	Halama (9–4)	—	Fenway Park	33,258	65–51	W4
117	August 15	Mariners	3–4	Meche (4–2)	Portugal (7–10)	Mesa (25)	Fenway Park	32,460	65–52	L1
118	August 16	Athletics	6–5	Lowe (4–2)	Jones (3–5)	—	Fenway Park	30,597	66–52	W1
119	August 17	Athletics	1–12	Heredia (10–5)	Saberhagen (9–5)	—	Fenway Park	31,246	66–53	L1
120	August 18	Athletics	7–4	Garcés (1–1)	Appier (12–10)	Lowe (6)	Fenway Park	32,405	67–53	W1
121	August 19	Athletics	2–6	Hudson (8–1)	P. Martínez (17–4)	Mathews (3)	Fenway Park	33,393	67–54	L1
122	August 20	@ Rangers	3–4	Loaiza (6–1)	Portugal (7–11)	Wetteland (34)	The Ballpark in Arlington	35,036	67–55	L2
123	August 21	@ Rangers	2–9	Helling (10–7)	Rose (6–5)	—	The Ballpark in Arlington	45,641	67–56	L3
124	August 22	@ Rangers	0–6	Sele (14–7)	Wakefield (4–9)	—	The Ballpark in Arlington	28,099	67–57	L4
125	August 23	@ Twins	4–1	Rapp (5–5)	Hawkins (8–11)	Lowe (7)	Metrodome	14,331	68–57	W1
126	August 24	@ Twins	7–1	P. Martínez (18–4)	Ryan (0–1)	—	Metrodome	12,332	69–57	W2
127	August 25	@ Twins	3–6	Radke (10–12)	Portugal (7–12)	—	Metrodome	11,185	69–58	L1
128	August 27	Angels	4–3	Garcés (2–1)	Percival (3–3)	Lowe (8)	Fenway Park	32,921	70–58	W1
129	August 28	Angels	7–6	Lowe (5–2)	Pote (0–1)	—	Fenway Park	33,060	71–58	W2
130	August 29	Angels	7–4	Rapp (6–5)	Belcher (5–8)	Lowe (9)	Fenway Park	32,253	72–58	W3
131	August 30	Royals	9–1	P. Martínez (19–4)	Suppan (8–8)	—	Fenway Park	32,705	73–58	W4
132	August 31	Royals	6–3	Garcés (3–1)	Witasick (5–11)	Lowe (10)	Fenway Park	32,177	74–58	W5

September / October: 20–10

#	Date	Opponent	Score	Win	Loss	Save	Stadium	Attendance	Record	Streak
133	September 1	Royals	4–3	Mercker (7–5)	Rosado (7–13)	Beck (8)	Fenway Park	31,743	75–58	W6
134	September 2	Royals	2–4	Suzuki (1–4)	R. Martínez (0–1)	Fussell (1)	Fenway Park	31,387	75–59	L1
135	September 3	@ Mariners	1–2	Moyer (13–6)	Lowe (5–3)	—	Safeco Field	44,471	75–60	L2
136	September 4	@ Mariners	4–0	P. Martínez (20–4)	Abbott (5–2)	—	Safeco Field	44,597	76–60	W1
137	September 5	@ Mariners	9–7	Garcés (4–1)	Paniagua (6–11)	Lowe (11)	Safeco Field	44,019	77–60	W2
138	September 6	@ Mariners	3–2	Florie (3–1)	Halama (11–6)	Lowe (12)	Safeco Field	44,246	78–60	W3
139	September 7	@ Athletics	5–3	Wakefield (5–9)	Heredia (11–7)	Lowe (13)	Network Associates Coliseum	21,195	79–60	W4
140	September 8	@ Athletics	2–6	Appier (14–12)	Rapp (6–6)	—	Network Associates Coliseum	20,251	79–61	L1
141	September 10	@ Yankees	3–1	P. Martínez (21–4)	Pettitte (12–11)	—	Yankee Stadium	55,239	80–61	W1
142	September 11	@ Yankees	11–10	Garcés (5–1)	Irabu (10–6)	Beck (9)	Yankee Stadium	55,422	81–61	W2
143	September 12	@ Yankees	4–1	Cormier (2–0)	Clemens (12–9)	Beck (10)	Yankee Stadium	56,028	82–61	W3
144	September 13	@ Indians	7–11	Nagy (16–9)	Wakefield (5–10)	Shuey (6)	Jacobs Field	43,264	82–62	L1
145	September 14	@ Indians	12–3	Lowe (6–3)	Gooden (3–4)	—	Jacobs Field	43,203	83–62	W1
146	September 15	@ Indians	6–4 (13)	Wasdin (8–3)	Brower (1–1)	—	Jacobs Field	43,224	84–62	W2
147	September 17	Tigers	14–3	Florie (4–1)	Blair (2–11)	—	Fenway Park	29,038	85–62	W3
148	September 18	Tigers	9–1	Saberhagen (10–5)	Weaver (8–12)	—	Fenway Park	32,382	86–62	W4
149	September 19	Tigers	7–3	Wakefield (6–10)	Mlicki (13–12)	Lowe (14)	Fenway Park	30,777	87–62	W5
150	September 21	Blue Jays	3–0	P. Martínez (22–4)	Hentgen (10–12)	—	Fenway Park	27,799	88–62	W6
151	September 22	Blue Jays	9–14	Escobar (13–11)	Rapp (6–7)	—	Fenway Park	25,345	88–63	L1
152	September 23	Blue Jays	5–7	Wells (15–10)	Beck (2–5)	Koch (29)	Fenway Park	30,780	88–64	L2
153	September 24	Orioles	0–1	Mussina (17–7)	Saberhagen (10–6)	Timlin (27)	Fenway Park	32,930	88–65	L3
154	September 25	Orioles	4–1	R. Martínez (1–1)	Linton (1–3)	Garcés (2)	Fenway Park	32,107	89–65	W1
155	September 26	Orioles	5–8	Johnson (8–7)	Wakefield (6–11)	Orosco (1)	Fenway Park	32,115	89–66	L1
156	September 27	Orioles	5–3	P. Martínez (23–4)	Erickson (15–12)	Lowe (15)	Fenway Park	33,477	90–66	W1
—	September 28	@ White Sox	Postponed (rain). Makeup date September 29.							
157	September 29 (1)	@ White Sox	6–2	Mercker (8–5)	Parque (9–15)	—	Comiskey Park	—	91–66	W2
158	September 29 (2)	@ White Sox	2–4	Foulke (3–3)	Gordon (0–2)	Howry (26)	Comiskey Park	12,974	91–67	L1
159	September 30	@ White Sox	2–5	Lowe (4–1)	Rose (6–6)	Howry (27)	Comiskey Park	12,788	91–68	L2
160	October 1	@ Orioles	6–2	Ohka (1–2)	Linton (1–4)	—	Camden Yards	43,081	92–68	W1
161	October 2	@ Orioles	8–0	R. Martínez (2–1)	Johns (6–4)	—	Camden Yards	48,338	93–68	W2
162	October 3	@ Orioles	1–0	Rose (7–6)	Timlin (3–9)	Wakefield (15)	Camden Yards	47,567	94–68	W3

=== Postseason game log ===
Boston Red Sox 1999 Postseason Game Log (4–6)
American League Division Series vs. Cleveland Indians (3–2)

#/	Date	Opponent	Score	Win	Loss	Save	Stadium	Attendance	Series	Streak
1	October 6	@ Indians	2–3	Shuey (1–0)	Lowe (0–1)	—	Jacobs Field	45,182	0–1	L1
2	October 7	@ Indians	1–11	Nagy (1–0)	Saberhagen (0–1)	—	Jacobs Field	45,184	0–2	L2
3	October 9	Indians	9–3	Lowe (1–1)	Wright (0–1)	—	Fenway Park	33,539	1–2	W1
4	October 10	Indians	23–7	Garcés (1–0)	Colón (0–1)	—	Fenway Park	33,898	2–2	W2
5	October 11	@ Indians	12–8	P. Martínez (1–0)	Shuey (1–1)	—	Jacobs Field	45,114	3–2	W3
Red Sox Win Series 3–2

American League Championship Series vs. New York Yankees (1–4)

#	Date	Opponent	Score	Win	Loss	Save	Stadium	Attendance	Series	Streak
1	October 13	@ Yankees	3–4	Rivera (1–0)	Beck (0–1)	—	Yankee Stadium	57,181	0–1	L1
2	October 14	@ Yankees	2–3	Cone (1–0)	R. Martínez (0–1)	Rivera (3)	Yankee Stadium	57,180	0–2	L2
3	October 16	Yankees	13–1	P. Martínez (2–0)	Clemens (1–1)	—	Fenway Park	33,190	1–2	W1
4	October 17	Yankees	2–9	Pettitte (2–0)	Saberhagen (0–2)	Rivera (4)	Fenway Park	33,856	1–3	L1
5	October 18	Yankees	1–6	Hernández (2–0)	Mercker (0–1)	Mendoza (1)	Fenway Park	33,589	1–4	L2
Red Sox Lose Series 1–4

== Awards and honors ==
- Nomar Garciaparra – AL Player of the Month (May)
- Pedro Martínez – American League Cy Young Award, AL Pitcher of the Month (April, May, June, September)

All-Star Game

- Nomar Garciaparra, starting SS
- Pedro Martínez, starting P
- José Offerman, reserve 2B

== Farm system ==
The Augusta GreenJackets replaced the Michigan Battle Cats as the Red Sox' Class A affiliate.

Level	Team	League	Manager
AAA	Pawtucket Red Sox	International League	Gary Jones
AA	Trenton Thunder	Eastern League	DeMarlo Hale
A-Advanced	Sarasota Red Sox	Florida State League	Butch Hobson
A	Augusta GreenJackets	South Atlantic League	Billy Gardner Jr.
A-Short Season	Lowell Spinners	New York–Penn League	Luis Aguayo
Rookie	GCL Red Sox	Gulf Coast League	John Sanders
Rookie	DSL Red Sox	Dominican Summer League	Nelson Norman
Rookie	VSL Red Sox (cooperative)	Venezuelan Summer League	

VSL cooperative was with the Chicago Cubs and Cincinnati Reds.
LEAGUE CHAMPIONS: Augusta
