= 1999 Cleveland Indians season =

1999 Cleveland Indians
- American League Central champions
- League: American League
- Division: Central
- Ballpark: Jacobs Field
- City: Cleveland, Ohio
- Record: 97–65 (.599)
- Divisional place: 1st
- Owners: Richard Jacobs
- General managers: John Hart
- Managers: Mike Hargrove
- Television: WUAB; Jack Corrigan, Mike Hegan; FSN Ohio; John Sanders, Rick Manning
- Radio: WTAM; Tom Hamilton, Dave Nelson, Matt Underwood, Mike Hegan

The 1999 Cleveland Indians season was the 99th season for the franchise and the 6th season at Jacobs Field. They are the only team in Major League Baseball since 1950 to score over 1,000 runs during the regular season. They were shut out only three times in 162 games. Five Indians scored at least 100 runs and four drove in at least 100 runs. Right fielder Manny Ramirez drove in 165 runs, the most by any MLB player since Jimmie Foxx in 1938.

== Offseason ==
- October 28, 1998: Bruce Aven was selected off waivers by the Florida Marlins from the Cleveland Indians.
- November 18, 1998: Brian Giles was traded by the Indians to the Pittsburgh Pirates for Ricardo Rincón.
- December 1, 1998: Roberto Alomar was signed as a free agent by the Indians.
- December 8, 1998: Mark Whiten was signed as a free agent by the Indians.

== Regular season ==
July 3, 1999: Against the Kansas City Royals, Jim Thome hit a 511 ft home run, the longest ever in Cleveland Indians history. It was hit to center field and cleared the outer gates onto Eagle Avenue outside of Jacobs Field.

=== Season standings ===
AL Central
Team	W	L	Pct.	GB	Home	Road
Cleveland Indians	97	65	.599	—	47‍–‍34	50‍–‍31
Chicago White Sox	75	86	.466	21½	38‍–‍42	37‍–‍44
Detroit Tigers	69	92	.429	27½	38‍–‍43	31‍–‍49
Kansas City Royals	64	97	.398	32½	33‍–‍47	31‍–‍50
Minnesota Twins	63	97	.394	33	31‍–‍50	32‍–‍47

=== Record vs. opponents ===
1999 American League record Source: MLB Standings Grid – 1999
Team	ANA	BAL	BOS	CWS	CLE	DET	KC	MIN	NYY	OAK	SEA	TB	TEX	TOR	NL
Anaheim	—	3–9	1–9	5–5	1–9	5–5	7–5	6–4	6–4	8–4	6–6	7–5	6–6	3–9	6–12
Baltimore	9–3	—	5–7	7–3	1–9	5–5	6–4	8–1	4–9	5–7	5–5	5–7	6–6	1–11	11–7
Boston	9–1	7–5	—	7–5	8–4	7–5	8–2	6–4	8–4	4–6	7–3	4–9	4–5	9–3	6–12
Chicago	5–5	3–7	5–7	—	3–9	7–5	6–6	8–3–1	5–7	3–7	4–8	6–4	5–5	6–4	9–9
Cleveland	9–1	9–1	4–8	9–3	—	8–5	7–5	9–3	3–7	10–2	7–3	5–4	3–7	5–7	9–9
Detroit	5–5	5–5	5–7	5–7	5–8	—	7–4	6–6	5–7	4–6	3–7	4–5	5–5	2–10	8–10
Kansas City	5–7	4–6	2–8	6–6	5–7	4–7	—	5–8	5–4	6–6	7–5	2–8	4–6	3–7	6–12
Minnesota	4–6	1–8	4–6	3–8–1	3–9	6–6	8–5	—	4–6	7–5	4–8	5–5	0–12	4–6	10–7
New York	4–6	9–4	4–8	7–5	7–3	7–5	4–5	6–4	—	6–4	9–1	8–4	8–4	10–2	9–9
Oakland	4–8	7–5	6–4	7–3	2–10	6–4	6–6	5–7	4–6	—	6–6	9–1	5–7	8–2	12–6
Seattle	6–6	5–5	3–7	8–4	3–7	7–3	5–7	8–4	1–9	6–6	—	8–4	5–8	7–2	7–11
Tampa Bay	5–7	7–5	9–4	4–6	4–5	5–4	8–2	5–5	4–8	1–9	4–8	—	4–8	5–8	4–14
Texas	6–6	6–6	5–4	5–5	7–3	5–5	6–4	12–0	4–8	7–5	8–5	8–4	—	6–4	10–8
Toronto	9–3	11–1	3–9	4–6	7–5	10–2	7–3	6–4	2–10	2–8	2–7	8–5	4–6	—	9–9

=== Transactions ===
- April 14, 1999: Jhonny Peralta was signed as an amateur free agent by the Indians.

=== Roster ===
1999 Cleveland Indians
Roster
Pitchers: 45 Paul Assenmacher; 50 Jim Brower; 34 Dave Burba; 49 Tom Candiotti; 40 Bartolo Colón; 47 Rich DeLucia; 56 Sean DePaula; 16 Dwight Gooden; 48 Chris Haney; 42 Mike Jackson; 20 Steve Karsay; 22 Mark Langston; 36 Tom Martin; 41 Charles Nagy; 62 Jim Poole; 59 Jason Rakers; 39 Steve Reed; 73 Ricardo Rincón; 54 David Riske; 53 Paul Shuey; 48 Jerry Spradlin; 33 Dave Stevens; 46 Jeff Tam; 37 Paul Wagner; 27 Jaret Wright	Catchers: 15 Sandy Alomar Jr.; 10 Pat Borders; 2 Einar Díaz; 26 Jesse Levis; 9 Chris Turner; Infielders: 12 Roberto Alomar; 9 Carlos Baerga; 33 Russell Branyan; 17 Travis Fryman; 29 Tyler Houston; 26 Jeff Manto; 8 John McDonald; 44 Richie Sexson; 25 Jim Thome; 13 Omar Vizquel; 35 Enrique Wilson	Outfielders: 6 Jolbert Cabrera; 1 Wil Cordero; 51 Jacob Cruz; 23 David Justice; 7 Kenny Lofton; 61 Alex Ramírez; 24 Manny Ramírez; 52 Dave Roberts; 12 Mark Whiten; Other batters: 33 Harold Baines	Manager: 30 Mike Hargrove; Coaches: 11 Brian Graham (First base); 4 Luis Isaac (Bullpen); 28 Clarence Jones (Outfield); 32 Charlie Manuel (Hitting); 55 Jeff Newman (Third base); 38 Phil Regan (Pitching); 43 Dan Williams (Bullpen catcher)

== Game log ==
1999 Game Log
April

#	Date	Opponent	Score	Win	Loss	Save	Attendance	Record
1	April 6	@ Angels	6–5		Karsay (0–1)	Percival (1)	39,936	0–1
2	April 7	@ Angels	9–1	Burba (1–0)	Hill (0–1)		21,689	1-1
3	April 8	@ Angels	9–1	Colón (1–0)	Sparks (0–1)		25,084	2–1
4	April 9	@ Twins	14–5	Nagy (1–0)	Hawkins (0–1)		16,348	3–1
5	April 10	@ Twins	12–7	Karsay (1-1)	Lincoln (0–2)		18,829	4–1
6	April 11	@ Twins	9–8	Wright (1–0)	Radke (1-1)	Jackson (1)	12,430	5–1
7	April 12	Royals	5–2 (10)	Shuey (1–0)	Santiago (0–1)		42,798	6–1
8	April 14	Royals	11–4	Colón (2–0)	Suppan (0–2)		42,926	7–1
9	April 17	Twins	5–1	Nagy (2–0)	Radke (1–2)		40,582	8–1
10	April 17	Twins	13–8 (11)	Aguilera (2–0)	Jackson (0–1)		42,860	8–2
11	April 18	Twins	3–2	Shuey (2–0)	Wells (1-1)	Jackson (2)	42,317	9–2
12	April 20	Athletics	5–1	Colón (3–0)	Rogers (0–2)		42,954	10–2
13	April 21	Athletics	5–4	Reed (1–0)	Taylor (0–1)		41,933	11–2
14	April 22	Athletics	4–1	Candiotti (2-2)	Nagy (2–1)	Taylor (3)	42,937	11–3
15	April 23	@ Red Sox	7–6	Karsay (2–1)	Corsi (0–1)	Jackson (3)	29,921	12–3
16	April 24	@ Red Sox	9–4	Harikkala (1–0)	DeLucia (0–1)		29,481	12–4
17	April 25	@ Red Sox	3–2	Martínez (4–1)	Shuey (2–1)		30,472	12–5
18	April 26	@ Athletics	5–4 (10)	Karsay (3–1)	Taylor (0–2)	Jackson (4)	7,646	13–5
19	April 27	@ Athletics	8–5	Nagy (3–1)	Candiotti (2–3)	Jackson (5)	7,161	14–5
20	April 28	@ Athletics	4–1	Wright (2–0)	Haynes (1–4)	Jackson (6)	9,555	15–5
21	April 29	@ Athletics	8–3	Burba (2–0)	Oquist (2-2)		10,115	16–5
22	April 30	@ Rangers	7–5	Helling (2–3)	Colón (3–1)	Wetteland (8)	36,556	16–6

May

#	Date	Opponent	Score	Win	Loss	Save	Attendance	Record
23	May 1	@ Rangers	5–3	Gooden (1–0)	Sele (3–2)	Jackson (7)	45,579	17–6
24	May 2	@ Rangers	8–6	Clark (2-2)	Nagy (3–2)	Wetteland (9)	29,921	17–7
25	May 3	@ Rangers	10–4	Wright (3–0)	Morgan (4–2)		31,181	18–7
26	May 5	Mariners	6–5	Fassero (1–3)	Burba (2–1)	Mesa (7)	42,991	18–8
27	May 6	Mariners	8–4	Colón (4–1)	Weaver (0–1)		41,962	19–8
28	May 7	Devil Rays	20–11	Wagner (1–0)	Mecir (0–1)		40,601	20–8
29	May 8	Devil Rays	7–6	Rekar (3–1)	Nagy (3-3)	Hernández (12)	40,590	20–9
30	May 9	Devil Rays	5–4	Wright (4–0)	Álvarez (1–2)	Jackson (8)	42,835	21–9
31	May 10	Orioles	6–4	Burba (3–1)	Guzmán (1–4)	Jackson (9)	40,615	22–9
32	May 11	Orioles	11–6	Colón (5–1)	Ponson (2–3)		40,587	23–9
33	May 12	Orioles	6–5	Assenmacher (1–0)	Timlin (1–2)	Shuey (1)	42,939	24–9
34	May 14	@ Tigers	4–2	Karsay (4–1)	Brocail (1-1)	Shuey (2)	21,844	25–9
35	May 15	@ Tigers	12–7	Burba (4–1)	Mlicki (1–3)		39,769	26–9
36	May 16	@ Tigers	9–3	Weaver (4–3)	Wright (4–1)	Kida (1)	29,731	26–10
37	May 17	@ White Sox	13–9	Colón (6–1)	Navarro (2–4)		17,101	27–10
38	May 18	@ White Sox	13–0	Gooden (2–0)	Baldwin (2–4)		13,429	28–10
39	May 19	@ White Sox	13–7	Nagy (4–3)	Parque (5–3)		14,854	29–10
40	May 21	Tigers	9–6	Nitkowski (1-1)	Shuey (2-2)	Jones (7)	43,290	29–11
41	May 22	Tigers	6–2	Weaver (5–3)	Wright (4–2)		40,991	29–12
42	May 23	Tigers	7–4	Shuey (3–2)	Jones (0–1)		40,874	30–12
43	May 24	White Sox	10–3	Lowe (2–0)	Gooden (2–1)		43,208	30–13
44	May 25	White Sox	3–1	Nagy (5–3)	Parque (5–4)	Jackson (10)	42,161	31–13
45	May 26	White Sox	6–2	Burba (5–1)	Sirotka (2–6)	Shuey (3)	43,228	32–13
46	May 28	Red Sox	12–5	Wakefield (3–4)	Wright (4–3)	Lowe (3)	43,287	32–14
47	May 29	Red Sox	4–2	Martínez (10–1)	Colón (6–2)	Gordon (9)	43,255	32–15
48	May 30	Red Sox	4–2	Rose (3–0)	Gooden (2-2)	Gordon (10)	43,207	32–16
49	May 31	@ Yankees	7–1	Nagy (6–3)	Hernández (5-5)		46,605	33–16

June

#	Date	Opponent	Score	Win	Loss	Save	Attendance	Record
50	June 1	@ Yankees	11–5	Clemens (5–0)	Burba (5–2)		32,759	33–17
51	June 2	@ Yankees	10–7	Karsay (5–1)	Pettitte (3-3)	Jackson (11)	36,955	34–17
52	June 4	Cubs	5–4	Aguilera (2–1)	Jackson (0–2)	Adams (2)	43,011	34–18
53	June 5	Cubs	8–7 (11)	John Cena (4-20)	Sanders (1–4)		43,085	35–18
54	June 6	Cubs	4–2	Nagy (7–3)	Trachsel (2–7)	Shuey (4)	43,010	36–18
55	June 8	Brewers	2–1 (10)	Roque (1–4)	Assenmacher (1-1)	Wickman (11)	42,300	36–19
56	June 9	Brewers	6–5 (10)	Jackson (2-2)	Roque (1–5)		43,160	37–19
57	June 10	Brewers	15–9	Nomo (3–1)	Colón (6–3)		43,196	37–20
58	June 11	@ Reds	8–6	Shuey (4–2)	Williamson (5–2)	Jackson (12)	42,928	38–20
59	June 12	@ Reds	4–3	Nagy (8–3)	Harnisch (5–6)	Jackson (13)	52,804	39–20
60	June 13	@ Reds	7–3	Burba (6–2)	Avery (3–6)	Karsay (1)	45,593	40–20
61	June 15	Athletics	8–3	Wright (5–3)	Haynes (4–6)		43,231	41–20
62	June 16	Athletics	9–8	Karsay (6–1)	Taylor (0–4)		43,163	42–20
63	June 17	Athletics	10–6	Shuey (5–2)	Worrell (1-1)		43,262	43–20
64	June 18	Mariners	9–4	Halama (5–2)	Nagy (8–4)		43,126	43–21
65	June 19	Mariners	10–6	Burba (7–2)	Watson (0–1)	Jackson (14)	43,205	44–21
66	June 20	Mariners	13–5	Wright (6–3)	Rodriguez (2–1)		43,070	45–21
67	June 21	Mariners	4–3 (12)	Karsay (7–1)	Mesa (0–2)		43,093	46–21
68	June 22	@ Blue Jays	4–3	Escobar (7–4)	Gooden (2–3)	Koch (7)	22,197	46–22
69	June 23	@ Blue Jays	9–6	Nagy (9–4)	Quantrill (0–1)		23,271	47–22
70	June 24	@ Blue Jays	3–0	Halladay (6–3)	Burba (7–3)	Koch (8)	26,117	47–23
71	June 25	@ Royals	8–2	Suppan (4-4)	Wright (6–4)		32,147	47–24
72	June 26	@ Royals	11–7	Montgomery (1–3)	Rincón (0–1)		29,358	47–25
73	June 27	@ Royals	6–5	Reed (2–0)	Byrdak (0–1)	Jackson (15)	17,094	48–25
74	June 28	@ Royals	6–1	Nagy (10–4)	Witasick (3–6)		23,429	49–25
75	June 29	Twins	5–4	Reed (3–0)	Trombley (1–5)		43,159	50–25
76	June 30	Twins	5–3	Milton (3–7)	Wright (6–5)	Trombley (12)	43,061	50–26

July

#	Date	Opponent	Score	Win	Loss	Save	Attendance	Record
77	July 1	Twins	7–5	Colón (7–3)	Carrasco (0–1)	Jackson (16)	43,010	51–26
78	July 2	Royals	9–7 (10)	Whisenant (3-3)	Shuey (5–3)		43,172	51–27
79	July 3	Royals	9–8	Candiotti (1–0)	Pisciotta (0–2)	Jackson (17)	43,086	52–27
80	July 3	Royals	9–5	Langston (1–0)	Wengert (0–1)	Jackson (18)	40,707	53–27
81	July 4	Royals	10–9	Appier (8–6)	Burba (7–4)	Byrdak (1)	43,018	53–28
82	July 6	@ Twins	3–1	Wright (7–5)	Milton (3–8)	Jackson (19)	12,579	54–28
83	July 7	@ Twins	4–3	Trombley (2–5)	Reed (3–1)		12,710	54–29
84	July 8	@ Twins	9–2	Nagy (11–4)	Lincoln (3–9)		14,118	55–29
85	July 9	Reds	3–2	Avery (6–7)	Burba (7–5)	Williamson (11)	43,208	55–30
86	July 10	Reds	11–10	Jackson (3–2)	Williamson (7–4)		43,127	56–30
87	July 11	Reds	9–4	Graves (6–3)	Shuey (5–4)		43,167	56–31
88	July 15	@ Pirates	2–0	Colón (8–3)	Schmidt (8–7)	Jackson (20)	39,620	57–31
89	July 16	@ Pirates	11–3	Córdova (5–4)	Burba (7–6)		43,519	57–32
90	July 17	@ Pirates	13–10	Benson (7-7)	Nagy (11–5)	Williams (14)	43,299	57–33
91	July 18	@ Astros	2–0	Hampton (12–3)	Wright (7–6)		50,299	57–34
92	July 19	@ Astros	3–2 (11)	Cabrera (3–0)	Candiotti (1-1)		34,276	57–35
93	July 20	@ Astros	7–1	Colón (9–3)	Reynolds (11–7)		41,133	58–35
94	July 21	Blue Jays	4–3	Frascatore (5–0)	Jackson (3-3)	Koch (16)	43,218	58–36
95	July 22	Blue Jays	4–3	Wells (11–6)	Nagy (11–6)	Koch (17)	43,138	58–37
96	July 23	@ Yankees	9–8 (10)	Grimsley (7–1)	Jackson (3–4)		52,704	58–38
97	July 24	@ Yankees	21–1	Irabu (7–3)	Langston (1-1)		54,870	58–39
98	July 25	@ Yankees	2–1	Mendoza (4–6)	Rincón (0–2)		54,944	58–40
99	July 26	Tigers	6–3	Burba (8–6)	Thompson (9-9)	Jackson (21)	43,157	59–40
100	July 27	Tigers	14–5	Nagy (12–6)	Borkowski (0–1)		43,042	60–40
101	July 28	Tigers	7–2	Gooden (3-3)	Moehler (8–10)		43,162	61–40
102	July 30	White Sox	10–2	Colón (10–3)	Sirotka (7–10)		43,181	62–40
103	July 31	White Sox	13–10	Shuey (6–4)	Castillo (1-1)	Jackson (22)	43,209	63–40

August

#	Date	Opponent	Score	Win	Loss	Save	Attendance	Record
104	August 1	White Sox	6–3	Baldwin (5–11)	Nagy (12–7)	Howry (17)	43,067	63–41
105	August 2	@ Red Sox	7–5	Karsay (8–1)	Garces (0–1)	Jackson (23)	33,218	64–41
106	August 3	@ Red Sox	5–4	Shuey (7–4)	Wakefield (3–8)	Jackson (24)	33,650	65–41
107	August 4	@ Red Sox	7–2	Portugal (7–8)	Colón (10–4)		33,282	65–42
108	August 6	@ Devil Rays	4–2	Yan (3–2)	Burba (8–7)	Hernández (29)	34,623	65–43
109	August 7	@ Devil Rays	15–10	Nagy (13–7)	Witt (6–8)		39,512	66–43
110	August 8	@ Devil Rays	5–3	Álvarez (6-6)	Wright (7-7)	Hernández (30)	33,052	66–44
111	August 9	@ Angels	4–0	Colón (11–4)	Hill (4–11)		22,013	67–44
112	August 10	@ Angels	2–1 (10)	Rincón (1–2)	Petkovsek (9–4)	Jackson (25)	25,777	68–44
113	August 11	@ Angels	4–3	Burba (9–7)	Sparks (5–9)	Jackson (26)	26,399	69–44
114	August 13	Orioles	6–3	Rincón (2-2)	Erickson (8–10)	Jackson (27)	43,073	70–44
115	August 14	Orioles	7–1	Karsay (9–1)	Johnson (3–7)		43,103	71–44
116	August 15	Orioles	5–1	Colón (12–4)	Ponson (11–8)		43,020	72–44
117	August 16	Rangers	13–5	Munoz (2–1)	Rincón (2–3)		43,226	72–45
118	August 17	Rangers	15–4	Sele (13–7)	Langston (1–2)		42,987	72–46
119	August 18	Rangers	6–1	Burkett (4–6)	Nagy (13–8)		42,997	72–47
120	August 19	Rangers	8–0	Karsay (10–1)	Morgan (12–8)		43,263	73–47
121	August 20	@ Mariners	7–4	Colón (13–4)	Halama (9–5)	Jackson (28)	44,915	74–47
122	August 21	@ Mariners	6–0	Burba (10–7)	Meche (4–3)		44,891	75–47
123	August 22	@ Mariners	7–4 (10)	Riske (1–0)	Mesa (1–5)	Jackson (29)	44,941	76–47
124	August 23	@ Mariners	4–1	Abbott (5–0)	Nagy (13–9)	Mesa (28)	44,689	76–48
125	August 24	@ Athletics	11–10	Mathews (8–3)	Shuey (7–5)		17,417	76–49
126	August 25	@ Athletics	12–4	Colón (14–4)	Oquist (9-9)		21,328	77–49
127	August 27	Devil Rays	2–1	Burba (11–7)	Arrojo (4–9)	Jackson (30)	43,303	78–49
128	August 28	Devil Rays	3–0	Nagy (14–9)	Witt (7–11)	Jackson (31)	43,190	79–49
129	August 29	Devil Rays	6–4	Álvarez (9–6)	Haney (0–1)	Hernández (36)	43,151	79–50
130	August 30	Angels	7–5	Colón (15–4)	Levine (1-1)	Jackson (32)	43,295	80–50
131	August 31	Angels	14–12	Poole (1–0)	Percival (3–4)	Shuey (5)	43,284	81–50

September

#	Date	Opponent	Score	Win	Loss	Save	Attendance	Record
132	September 1	Angels	8–1	Burba (12–7)	Washburn (0–3)		43,399	82–50
133	September 2	Angels	6–5	Nagy (15–9)	Sparks (5–11)	Jackson (33)	43,369	83–50
134	September 3	@ Orioles	7–6	Assenmacher (2–1)	Reyes (0–3)	Jackson (34)	41,521	84–50
135	September 4	@ Orioles	3–1	Linton (1–2)	Colón (15–5)	Timlin (19)	47,095	84–51
136	September 5	@ Orioles	15–7	Brower (1–0)	Ponson (11-11)		44,214	85–51
137	September 6	@ Orioles	7–6	Burba (13–7)	Johns (4–3)	Jackson (35)	40,540	86–51
138	September 7	@ Rangers	4–3	Sele (16–7)	Reed (3–2)	Wetteland (40)	26,011	86–52
139	September 8	@ Rangers	3–0	Burkett (7-7)	Haney (0–2)	Wetteland (41)	29,889	86–53
140	September 10	@ White Sox	14–6	Colón (16–5)	Wells (2–1)		19,132	87–53
141	September 11	@ White Sox	4–3	Burba (14–7)	Parque (9–13)	Jackson (36)	34,400	88–53
142	September 12	@ White Sox	4–3	Sirotka (9–13)	Wright (7–8)	Howry (22)	20,481	88–54
143	September 13	Red Sox	11–7	Nagy (16–9)	Wakefield (5–10)	Shuey (6)	43,264	89–54
144	September 14	Red Sox	12–3	Lowe (6–3)	Gooden (3–4)		43,203	89–55
145	September 15	Red Sox	6–4 (13)	Wasdin (8–3)	Brower (1-1)		43,224	89–56
146	September 16	Yankees	9–5	Irabu (11–6)	Burba (14–8)		43,054	89–57
147	September 17	Yankees	9–4	Clemens (13–9)	Wright (7–9)		43,029	89–58
148	September 18	Yankees	5–4	Nagy (17–9)	Hernández (16–9)	Jackson (37)	43,002	90–58
149	September 19	Yankees	11–7	Watson (4–1)	Martin (0–1)		42,969	90–59
150	September 20	@ Tigers	4–3 (10)	Jones (4-4)	Riske (1-1)		26,106	90–60
151	September 21	@ Tigers	6–1	Burba (15–8)	Borkowski (1–5)		24,155	91–60
152	September 22	@ Tigers	9–1	Wright (8–9)	Moehler (9–16)		27,355	92–60
153	September 23	@ Tigers	7–5	Blair (3–11)	Nagy (17–10)	Jones (26)	34,970	92–61
154	September 24	@ Blue Jays	18–4	Brower (2–1)	Munro (0–2)		26,620	93–61
155	September 25	@ Blue Jays	9–6	Colón (17–5)	Spoljaric (2–1)	Jackson (38)	32,029	94–61
156	September 26	@ Blue Jays	11–7	Shuey (8–5)	Koch (0–5)		34,253	95–61
157	September 28	@ Royals	2–1	Brower (3–1)	Witasick (9–12)	Jackson (39)	11,009	96–61
158	September 29	@ Royals	5–2	Rosado (10–14)	Nagy (17–11)		11,814	96–62
159	September 30	Blue Jays	9–2	Colón (18–5)	Spoljaric (2-2)		43,201	97–62

October

#	Date	Opponent	Score	Win	Loss	Save	Attendance	Record
160	October 1	Blue Jays	8–6	Quantrill (3–2)	Karsay (10–2)	Koch (30)	43,040	97–63
161	October 2	Blue Jays	7–3	Hentgen (11–12)	Wright (8–10)	Koch (31)	43,049	97–64
162	October 3	Blue Jays	9–2	Wells (17–10)	Burba (15–9)		43,012	97–65

American League Division Series

#	Date	Opponent	Score	Win	Loss	Save	Attendance	Series
1	October 6	Red Sox	3–2	Shuey (1–0)	Lowe (0–1)		45,182	1–0
2	October 7	Red Sox	11–1	Nagy (1–0)	Saberhagen (0–1)		45,184	2–0
3	October 9	@ Red Sox	9–3	Lowe (1–0)	Wright (0–1)		33,539	2–1
4	October 10	@ Red Sox	23–7	Garces (1–0)	Colón (0–1)		33,898	2–2
5	October 12	Red Sox	12–8	Martínez (1–0)	Shuey (1-1)		45,114	2–3

== Player stats ==
=== Batting ===
==== Starters by position ====
Note: Pos = Position; G = Games played; AB = At bats; R = Runs scored; H = Hits; 2B = Doubles; 3B = Triples; HR = Home runs; RBI = Runs batted in; AVG = Batting average; SB = Stolen bases

Pos	Player	G	AB	R	H	2B	3B	HR	RBI	AVG	SB
C	Einar Díaz	119	392	43	110	21	1	3	32	.281	11
1B	Jim Thome	146	494	101	137	27	2	33	108	.277	0
2B	Roberto Alomar	159	563	138	182	40	3	24	120	.323	37
3B	Travis Fryman	85	322	45	82	16	2	10	48	.255	2
SS	Omar Vizquel	144	574	112	191	36	4	5	66	.333	42
LF	David Justice	133	429	75	123	18	0	21	88	.287	1
CF	Kenny Lofton	120	465	110	140	28	6	7	39	.301	25
RF	Manny Ramirez	147	522	131	174	34	3	44	165	.333	2
DH	Wil Cordero	54	194	35	58	15	0	8	32	.299	2

==== Other batters ====
Note: G = Games played; AB = At bats; R = Runs scored; H = Hits; 2B = Doubles; 3B = Triples; HR = Home runs; RBI = Runs batted in; AVG = Batting average; SB = Stolen bases

Player	G	AB	R	H	2B	3B	HR	RBI	AVG	SB
Sandy Alomar Jr.	37	137	19	42	13	0	6	25	.307	0
Carlos Baerga	22	57	4	13	0	0	1	5	.228	1
Harold Baines	28	85	5	23	2	0	1	22	.271	0
Pat Borders	6	20	2	6	0	1	0	3	.300	0
Russell Branyan	11	38	4	8	2	0	1	6	.211	0
Jolbert Cabrera	30	37	6	7	1	0	0	0	.189	3
Jacob Cruz	32	88	14	29	5	1	3	17	.330	0
Tyler Houston	13	27	2	4	1	0	1	3	.148	0
Jesse Levis	10	26	0	4	0	0	0	3	.154	0
Jeff Manto	12	25	5	5	0	0	1	2	.200	0
John McDonald	18	21	2	7	0	0	0	0	.333	0
Alex Ramírez	48	97	11	29	6	1	3	18	.299	1
Dave Roberts	41	143	26	34	4	0	2	12	.238	11
Richie Sexson	134	479	72	122	17	7	31	116	.255	3
Chris Turner	12	21	3	4	0	0	0	0	.190	1
Mark Whiten	8	25	2	4	1	0	1	4	.160	0
Enrique Wilson	113	332	41	87	22	1	2	24	.262	5

Note: Pitchers' batting statistics are not included above.

=== Pitching ===
==== Starting pitchers ====
Note: W = Wins; L = Losses; ERA = Earned run average; G = Games pitched; GS = Games started; IP = Innings pitched; H = Hits allowed; R = Runs allowed; ER = Earned runs allowed; BB = Walks allowed; K = Strikeouts

Player	W	L	ERA	G	GS	IP	H	R	ER	BB	K
Dave Burba	15	9	4.25	34	34	220.0	211	113	104	96	174
Bartolo Colón	18	5	3.95	32	32	205.0	185	97	90	76	161
Charles Nagy	17	11	4.95	33	32	202.0	238	120	111	59	126
Jaret Wright	8	10	6.06	26	26	133.2	144	99	90	77	91
Dwight Gooden	3	4	6.26	26	22	115.0	127	90	80	67	88

==== Other pitchers ====
Note: W = Wins; L = Losses; ERA = Earned run average; G = Games pitched; GS = Games started; SV = Saves; IP = Innings pitched; H = Hits allowed; R = Runs allowed; ER = Earned runs allowed; BB = Walks allowed; K = Strikeouts

Player	W	L	ERA	G	GS	SV	IP	H	R	ER	BB	K
Mark Langston	1	2	5.25	25	5	0	61.2	69	40	36	29	43
Chris Haney	0	2	4.69	13	4	0	40.1	43	22	21	16	22
Jim Brower	3	1	4.56	9	2	0	25.2	27	13	13	10	18
Tom Candiotti	1	1	11.05	7	2	0	14.2	19	18	18	7	11

==== Relief pitchers ====
Note: W = Wins; L = Losses; ERA = Earned run average; G = Games pitched; SV = Saves; IP = Innings pitched; H = Hits allowed; R = Runs allowed; ER = Earned runs allowed; BB = Walks allowed; K = Strikeouts

Player	W	L	ERA	G	SV	IP	H	R	ER	BB	K
Mike Jackson	3	4	4.06	72	39	68.2	60	32	31	26	55
Paul Shuey	8	5	3.53	72	6	81.2	68	40	37	32	103
Steve Reed	3	2	4.23	63	0	61.2	69	33	29	20	44
Ricardo Rincón	2	3	4.43	59	0	44.2	41	22	22	24	30
Paul Assenmacher	2	1	8.18	55	0	33.0	50	32	30	17	29
Steve Karsay	10	2	2.97	50	1	78.2	71	29	26	30	68
David Riske	1	1	8.36	12	0	14.0	20	15	13	6	16
Sean DePaula	0	0	4.63	11	0	11.2	8	6	6	3	18
Rich DeLucia	0	1	6.75	6	0	9.1	13	7	7	9	7
Tom Martin	0	1	8.68	6	0	9.1	13	9	9	3	8
Dave Stevens	0	0	10.00	5	0	9.0	10	10	10	8	6
Paul Wagner	1	0	4.15	3	0	4.1	5	4	2	3	0
Jerry Spradlin	0	0	18.00	4	0	3.0	6	6	6	3	2
Jason Rakers	0	0	4.50	1	0	2.0	2	1	1	1	0
Jim Poole	1	0	18.00	3	0	1.0	2	2	2	3	0
Jeff Tam	0	0	81.00	1	0	0.1	2	3	3	1	0

== Award winners ==
All-Star Game

== Minor league affiliates ==
Classification level	Team	League	Season article
AAA	Buffalo Bisons	International League	1999 Buffalo Bisons season
AA	Akron Aeros	Eastern League	1999 Akron Aeros season
Advanced A	Kinston Indians	Carolina League	
A	Columbus RedStixx	South Atlantic League	
Short Season A	Mahoning Valley Scrappers	New York–Penn League	
Rookie	Burlington Indians	Appalachian League	
