= Cho Jin-ho =

- Hangul: 조진호
- RR: Jo Jinho
- MR: Cho Chinho

Cho Jin-ho or Jo Jin-ho may refer to:

- Cho Jin-ho (footballer) (1971–2017), South Korean football player
- Cho Jin-ho (baseball) (born 1975), South Korean Major League Baseball pitcher
- Jinho (Jo Jin-ho, born 1992), singer in the South Korean pop group Pentagon
- Jo Jin-ho (footballer) (born 2003), South Korean football player
