= Jeff Frye =

American baseball player (born 1966)

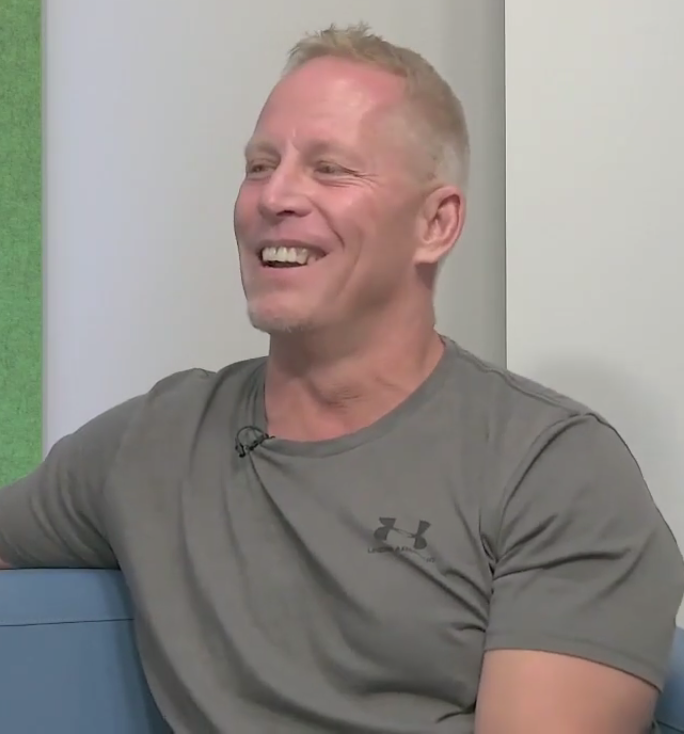
- Frye in 2022
- Second baseman
- Born: August 31, 1966 (age 59); Oakland, California, U.S.
- Batted: Right Threw: Right

MLB debut
- July 9, 1992, for the Texas Rangers

Last MLB appearance
- September 20, 2001, for the Toronto Blue Jays

MLB statistics
- Batting average: .290
- Home runs: 16
- Runs batted in: 194
- Stats at Baseball Reference

Teams
- Texas Rangers (1992, 1994–1995); Boston Red Sox (1996–1997, 1999–2000); Colorado Rockies (2000); Toronto Blue Jays (2001)

Jeffrey Dustin Frye (born August 31, 1966) is an American former professional baseball second baseman. Frye played in Major League Baseball with the Texas Rangers, Boston Red Sox, Colorado Rockies, and Toronto Blue Jays for all or part of eight seasons between 1992 and 2001. Currently, he is a baseball player agent.

He was listed as 5 feet 9 inches (1.75 m) tall, 165 pounds (75 kg) and threw and batted right-handed. Born in Oakland, California, he graduated from high school in Panama, Oklahoma, and played college baseball at Southeastern Oklahoma State University.

== Career ==
Frye was drafted by the Texas Rangers in the 30th round of the 1988 amateur draft and made his big league debut with them on July 9, 1992, at Arlington Stadium during a 14–4 Rangers victory over the Cleveland Indians. Frye went 2-for-3, including a triple, walk, RBI and three runs, as the starting second baseman and leadoff hitter. His first career home run came on July 24, 1992, off Baltimore Orioles pitcher Arthur Rhodes at Oriole Park at Camden Yards. He missed the 1993 season due to injury.

In 1996, after hitting just .238 in 49 games with the Rangers' American Association affiliate Oklahoma City 89ers, Frye was released. That same day, June 5, he was signed as a free agent with the Boston Red Sox. He had a career year in 1997 when he hit .310 with 6 home runs in 127 games. He missed the entire 1998 season due to an injured left knee but returned for the 1999 season, playing in 47 games.

Frye became a bench player when the Red Sox signed second baseman José Offerman prior to the 1999 season and, on July 27, 2000, was traded to the Colorado Rockies with Brian Rose and John Wasdin in exchange for Rolando Arrojo, Rick Croushore and Mike Lansing.

On December 11, 2000, Frye signed as a free agent with the Toronto Blue Jays. On August 17, 2001, he became the second Blue Jay in history to hit for the cycle. The first Blue Jays player to hit for the cycle was Kelly Gruber, who happened to be in attendance that day and walked onto the field to congratulate Frye after his last hit.

Frye's final big league appearance came on September 20, 2001, as he pinch-hit for catcher Darrin Fletcher in the 8th inning of a 12–6 loss to the Orioles. Frye flew out to left field and remained in the game at second base, replacing Homer Bush defensively.

Frye began working as an agent after retiring. He has represented players including Darren Oliver and Ian Kinsler.

== See also ==
- List of Major League Baseball players to hit for the cycle

Achievements
Preceded by Jeff Bagwell	Hitting for the cycle August 17, 2001	Succeeded by Miguel Tejada
