= Creighton Gubanich =

American baseball player (born 1972)

- Catcher
- Born: March 27, 1972 (age 52); Belleville, New Jersey, U.S.
- Batted: Right Threw: Right

MLB debut
- April 16, 1999, for the Boston Red Sox

Last MLB appearance
- July 23, 1999, for the Boston Red Sox

MLB statistics
- Batting average: .277
- Home runs: 1
- Runs batted in: 11
- Stats at Baseball Reference

Teams
- Boston Red Sox (1999)

Creighton Wade Gubanich (born March 27, 1972) is an American former professional baseball player who played briefly in the Major league baseball (MLB) in 1999 for the Boston Red Sox. Gubanich's primary position was catcher, though he also made two appearances as a designated hitter and played seven innings at third base.

== Career ==
Gubanich was selected by the Oakland Athletics in the sixth round, 117th pick overall of the 1990 Major League Baseball draft and signed with the Athletics on August 6, 1990. He remained in Oakland's minor league system until he was traded in 1997 to the Milwaukee Brewers for minor league pitcher Tony Phillips. On August 5, Gubanich was dealt to the Colorado Rockies as the player to be named later in an April 23 trade for infielder Jeff Huson.

Gubanich became a free agent at the end of the season and, on October 21, 1997, signed with the San Diego Padres for the 1998 campaign. He appeared in 86 games with the Las Vegas Stars of the Pacific Coast League, San Diego's AAA affiliate, and hit .291 with 19 home runs and 70 RBI.

Gubanich filed for free agency at the end of the 1998 season and signed on with the Boston Red Sox. He made his Major League Baseball debut with the Red Sox on April 16, 1999 against the Tampa Bay Devil Rays as a defensive replacement for Reggie Jefferson, who had pinch-hit for Boston catcher Jason Varitek. He made his first career start on April 22 against the Detroit Tigers, going 0-for-3 with a strikeout. Gubanich picked up his first hit in historic fashion on May 3, hitting a grand slam off Oakland A's pitcher Jimmy Haynes. With his big shot, Gubanich became only the fourth player in Major League Baseball history to hit a grand slam as their first career hit.

Despite his historic slam, Gubanich's time in the big leagues was short-lived as he appeared in just 15 more games with the Red Sox and was released in October 1999. He spent the next four seasons in the minor leagues and playing with independent league clubs, but never made it back to the big leagues.
