= Juan Peña (baseball) =

Dominican baseball player (born 1977)

- Pitcher
- Born: June 27, 1977 (age 49); Santo Domingo, Dominican Republic
- Batted: Right Threw: Right

MLB debut
- May 8, 1999, for the Boston Red Sox

Last MLB appearance
- May 14, 1999, for the Boston Red Sox

MLB statistics
- Win–loss record: 2–0
- Earned run average: 0.69
- Strikeouts: 15
- Stats at Baseball Reference

Teams
- Boston Red Sox (1999)
Medals
Men's baseball
Representing Dominican Republic
Central American and Caribbean Games
Gold medal – first place	2010 Mayagüez	Team

Juan Francisco Peña [peh-nya] (born June 27, 1977) is a Dominican former starting pitcher in Major League Baseball who played briefly for the Boston Red Sox during the 1999 season. Listed at 6' 5", 215 lb., he batted and threw right-handed.

Peña was a promising young pitcher in the Red Sox organization who had his baseball career shortened after suffering a serious injury. He posted a 2-0 record with a 0.69 ERA in two starts, giving up one run on nine hits and three walks while striking out 15 in 13 innings of work.

In spring training before the 2000 season, Peña was projected for the fifth starting rotation spot. He was 2-2 with a 1.64 ERA in 16 2/3 innings, but was hit in the elbow by a line drive and then experienced pain in the elbow during a warmup. An exam confirmed a torn medial collateral ligament in his elbow that required surgery, causing him to miss the season. By 2002, Peña had worked his way back to Triple-A, but he went just 4-11 with a 5.33 ERA, after which the Red Sox let him go. He spent the 2003 season in the Toronto Blue Jays organization, then spent two seasons pitching in the independent leagues and the Mexican League before retiring in 2005 at the age of 28. He now resides in South Florida with his girlfriend of nearly 2 years.

== See also ==
- List of players from Dominican Republic in Major League Baseball
