= Pat Rapp =

American baseball player (born 1967)

- Pitcher
- Born: July 13, 1967 (age 57); Jennings, Louisiana, U.S.
- Batted: Right Threw: Right

MLB debut
- July 10, 1992, for the San Francisco Giants

Last MLB appearance
- October 6, 2001, for the Anaheim Angels

MLB statistics
- Win–loss record: 70–91
- Earned run average: 4.68
- Strikeouts: 825
- Stats at Baseball Reference

Teams
- San Francisco Giants (1992); Florida Marlins (1993–1997); San Francisco Giants (1997); Kansas City Royals (1998); Boston Red Sox (1999); Baltimore Orioles (2000); Anaheim Angels (2001)

Patrick Leland Rapp (born July 13, 1967) is an American former professional baseball right-handed pitcher in Major League Baseball (MLB).

== Early life and career ==
Rapp was a student at Sulphur High School in Sulphur, Louisiana. After high school, Rapp attended the University of Southern Mississippi. He was drafted by the San Francisco Giants in the 15th round of the 1989 amateur draft. Rapp's career through the Giants' minor league system included stops at Pocatello, Idaho, Clinton, Iowa, San Jose, California, Shreveport, Louisiana, and Phoenix, Arizona, before getting called up to the big leagues by the Giants in 1992 at the age of 24. Rapp had three children when he was called up to the major leagues.

== Major league career ==
Rapp's major league debut was on July 10, 1992, as he pitched two scoreless innings against the Montreal Expos. He finished the season 0–2, with an ERA of 7.00 in 10 innings pitched. On November 17, 1992, during the 1992 Major League Expansion Draft held for the newly minted Florida Marlins and Colorado Rockies, Rapp was selected in the first round with the tenth overall pick by the Marlins. During the Marlins' first season in 1993, Rapp went 4–6 with a 4.02 ERA in 94 innings. During the strike shortened 1994 season, Rapp compiled a record of 7–8 with a 3.85 ERA, two complete games and his first career shutout. On September 18, 1995, Rapp pitched a one hitter on the road against the Rockies as the Marlins won 17–0. The only hit given up by Rapp was a bloop single by Dante Bichette in the fourth inning. It was only the second shutout loss suffered by the Rockies in 1995. In 1995, Rapp had a record of 14–7 with an ERA of 3.44. He had a stretch where he went 11–2 after the All-Star break.

In November 1995, Rapp had a surgery for a herniated disc in his back, but made it to spring training in 1996. During the 1996 season, Rapp went 8–16 with an ERA of 5.10. Rapp's 16 losses led the National League, along with Frank Castillo of the Chicago Cubs. In 1997, Rapp returned after an offseason training regimen of throwing footballs to build arm strength. He threw a shutout against the Rockies early in April, his first shutout since 1995. After starting the season 4–6 with an ERA of 4.47, Rapp was traded to the team which first drafted him, the San Francisco Giants for minor league pitchers Brandon Leese and Bobby Rector. Rapp finished up the 1997 season with San Francisco with a 1–2 record and an ERA of 6.00.

He was granted free agency on December 21, 1997, and signed with the Kansas City Royals on January 22, 1998. Rapp's 1998 season with Kansas City saw him finish 12–13, with a career high in strikeouts with 132 and an ERA of 5.30. The Royals granted Rapp free agency in December 1998 and he signed another one-year deal, this with the Boston Red Sox on January 11, 1999. Rapp went 6–7 for Boston with an ERA of 4.12. His 90 strikeouts were second on the Red Sox behind staff ace Pedro Martínez. Rapp worked 1.0 inning in the 1999 playoffs, against the New York Yankees, allowing one walk. After his one season in Boston, Rapp was granted free agency on November 2, 1999, and signed with the Baltimore Orioles on January 28, 2000. Rapp stated that all of his other offers at the time were non roster invitations. Rapp started the 2000 campaign 3–0, then learned that his father was ill with a lethal bacterial infection, sustained from cutting his leg while fishing. The infection caused the leg to swell to three times its normal size and put him into a coma. Rapp's form began to falter, his father dying in the middle of the 2000 season. Emotionally drained, Rapp returned to the Orioles on August 18 and pitched against the Royals, retiring 17 consecutive batters from the first inning onwards. Rapp finished his lone season with the Orioles with a mark of 9–12, a 5.90 ERA and 106 strikeouts.

Rapp was once again granted free agency on October 31, 2000, and signed by the Angels on December 11 of that year. Rapp's final season in the majors proved to be 2001; he finished the campaign with a record of 5–12 and an ERA of 4.68, with one complete game. He was granted free agency once again in November 2001. Rapp was signed by the Pirates to a minor league contract. In 2002, Rapp pitched in spring training, but was released on March 21. He felt that the team was not giving him enough chances to make the starting rotation. In four spring appearances, Rapp allowed 10 earned runs and 16 hits in 10.1 innings. General manager Dave Littlefield said that Rapp was not given his unconditional release due to the fact of his complaints but because he "Could not pitch deep into games. He has trouble after a couple of innings." Rapp threw a low 90s fastball, cutter and curveball.
