= John Wasdin =

American baseball player (born 1972)

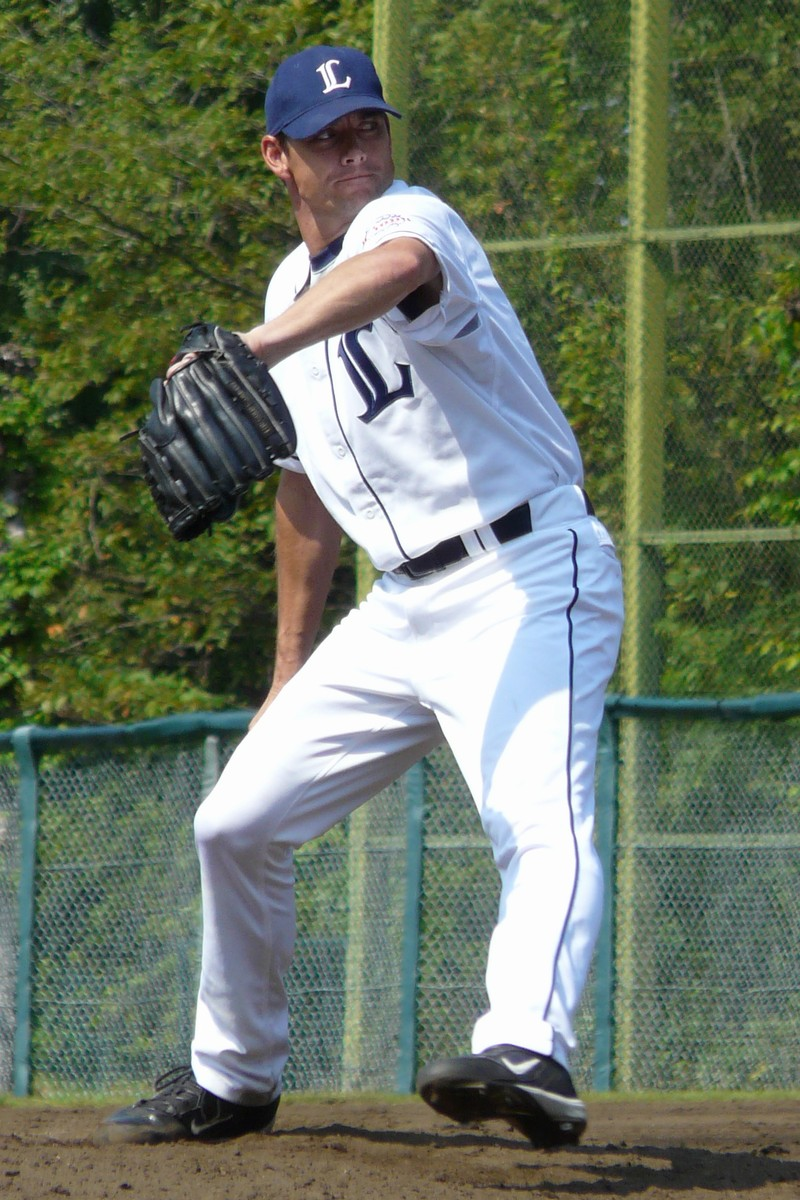
- Wasdin with the Saitama Seibu Lions
- Pitcher
- Born: August 5, 1972 (age 52); Fort Belvoir, Virginia, U.S.
- Batted: Right Threw: Right

Professional debut
- MLB: August 24, 1995, for the Oakland Athletics
- NPB: April 3, 2002, for the Yomiuri Giants

Last appearance
- MLB: July 7, 2007, for the Pittsburgh Pirates
- NPB: August 13, 2009, for the Saitama Seibu Lions

MLB statistics
- Win–loss record: 39–39
- Earned run average: 5.28
- Strikeouts: 527

NPB statistics
- Win–loss record: 3–7
- Earned run average: 5.00
- Strikeouts: 55
- Stats at Baseball Reference

Teams
- Oakland Athletics (1995–1996); Boston Red Sox (1997–2000); Colorado Rockies (2000–2001); Baltimore Orioles (2001); Yomiuri Giants (2002); Toronto Blue Jays (2003); Texas Rangers (2004–2006); Pittsburgh Pirates (2007); Saitama Seibu Lions (2009)

John Truman Wasdin (born August 5, 1972) is an American former professional baseball pitcher who played in Major League Baseball (MLB) from 1995 to 2007, and also played in Nippon Professional Baseball (NPB).

Wasdin made his MLB debut in 1995 with the Oakland Athletics. He also played in MLB for the Boston Red Sox, Colorado Rockies, Baltimore Orioles, Toronto Blue Jays, Texas Rangers, and Pittsburgh Pirates. He played in NPB for the Yomiuri Giants in 2002 and for the Saitama Seibu Lions in 2009, his final season.

== Early years ==
Wasdin was born in Fort Belvoir, Virginia, but raised in Tallahassee, Florida. He graduated from Amos P. Godby High School in Tallahassee. He was drafted by the New York Yankees in the 41st round of the 1990 MLB draft, but elected to attend Florida State University. In 1992, he played collegiate summer baseball with the Hyannis Mets of the Cape Cod Baseball League. He was selected by the Oakland Athletics in the 1993 MLB draft with the 25th overall pick.

== Professional career ==
Wasdin began his career in 1993 playing for the Rookie League Arizona League Athletics, Class A Madison Muskies, and Class A-Advanced Modesto A's. He played at Modesto and with the Double-A Huntsville Stars in 1994. He began the 1995 season with the Triple-A Edmonton Trappers, but was called up to the Oakland Athletics to make his major league debut on August 24. He appeared in five games (two starts) by the season's end. He began the 1996 season at Triple-A, but was recalled to Oakland where he pitched for the rest of the season.

On January 27, 1997, Wasdin was traded to the Boston Red Sox for Jose Canseco and cash considerations. He played the entire 1997 season for Boston and appeared in a major league career-high 53 games earning a 4–6 record with a 4.40 earned run average. He played most of the 1998 to 2000 seasons with Boston but also spent time with the Triple-A Pawtucket Red Sox. During his Red Sox career, Wasdin earned the ignominious nickname "Way back Wasdin" for giving up a lot of home runs.

The Red Sox traded Wasdin along with Jeff Taglienti, Jeff Frye, and Brian Rose to the Colorado Rockies in exchange for Rolando Arrojo, Rich Croushore, Mike Lansing, and cash on July 27, 2000. He played the remainder of the season with the Rockies. Colorado released him on June 5, 2001, after beginning the season 2–1 with a 7.03 ERA. Nearly a week later, he was signed by the Baltimore Orioles. He appeared in 26 games with the Orioles and 5 with their Triple-A Rochester Red Wings. After the season, he was traded to the Philadelphia Phillies for Chris Brock. Instead of playing for the Phillies, Wasdin elected to become a free agent and signed for the 2002 season with the Yomiuri Giants of Japan's Central League.

In December 2002, he signed with the Pittsburgh Pirates. In 2003, he played 18 games for the Triple-A Nashville Sounds. On April 7, 2003, his first start of the season, Wasdin pitched a perfect game for the Sounds against the Albuquerque Isotopes at Herschel Greer Stadium in Nashville, Tennessee. In all, Wasdin struck out 15 batters. Five ground outs and seven fly outs accounted for his other outs in the game. This was the sixth perfect game and second nine-inning perfect game in the history of the Pacific Coast League, which was established in 1903. He was also selected for the 2003 Triple-A All-Star Game, but was unable to participate after being traded to the Toronto Blue Jays for Rich Thompson on July 8. He appeared in 23 games for the Blue Jays before being sent to the Triple-A Syracuse SkyChiefs for the rest of the season.

Wasdin signed with the Texas Rangers for the 2004 season. He went back and forth between Texas and their Triple-A Oklahoma Redhawks from 2004 to 2006. On August 1, 2006, he was designated for assignment and was placed on unconditional waivers for the purpose of granting him his release on August 3. Wasdin was signed to a minor league contract by the Pittsburgh Pirates during the 2006 winter meetings and made the team during the last week of spring training in 2007. He also spent time with the Triple-A Indianapolis Indians that year. On November 19, 2007, he signed a minor league the St. Louis Cardinals, and spent the entire 2008 season playing for the Triple-A Memphis Redbirds. He played the 2009 season for the Saitama Seibu Lions of Japan's Pacific League.

== Coaching ==
After retiring from playing, Wasdin was hired in 2010 as the high school baseball coach at University Christian School in Jacksonville, Florida.

In 2011, the Oakland Athletics hired him to be the pitching coach for the Vermont Lake Monsters, their New York–Penn League Class A-Short Season affiliate. In 2012, he advanced to the Burlington Bees (Class A Midwest League). That season he was moved up to the Midland RockHounds (Double-A Texas League) where he served as pitching coach through 2016. He left the Athletics organization to become the minor league pitching coordinator for the Baltimore Orioles in January 2017. Wasdin was promoted to bullpen coach on first-year Orioles manager Brandon Hyde's staff two years later in January 2019. He was not retained by the ballclub following the 2019 season.

== Pitches ==
Wasdin's pitches were tracked by PITCHf/x during a game on April 20, 2007. The data from that game shows him throwing a four-seam fastball and sinker at 90–91 mph, a curveball at 79 mph, and a changeup at 81.
