= Rich DeLucia =

American baseball player (born 1964)

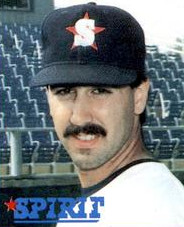
- DeLucia in 1988
- Pitcher
- Born: October 7, 1964 (age 61); Reading, Pennsylvania, U.S.
- Batted: Right Threw: Right

MLB debut
- September 8, 1990, for the Seattle Mariners

Last MLB appearance
- May 28, 1999, for the Cleveland Indians

MLB statistics
- Win–loss record: 38–51
- Earned run average: 4.62
- Strikeouts: 502
- Stats at Baseball Reference

Teams
- Seattle Mariners (1990–1993); Cincinnati Reds (1994); St. Louis Cardinals (1995); San Francisco Giants (1996–1997); Anaheim Angels (1997–1998); Cleveland Indians (1999)

Richard Anthony DeLucia (born October 7, 1964) is an American former Major League Baseball (MLB) pitcher who played for several teams between 1990 and 1999.

== Playing career ==
A native of Reading, Pennsylvania, DeLucia graduated from Wyomissing High School in 1982 and attended the University of Tennessee. He set a Volunteers career record with 246 strikeouts, since surpassed. In 1984, he played collegiate summer baseball with the Wareham Gatemen of the Cape Cod Baseball League.

DeLucia was selected by the Seattle Mariners in the sixth round of the 1986 MLB draft. That July, he threw a 7-inning no-hitter for the Bellingham Mariners. He missed most of the 1987 season with elbow surgery and dealt with a back injury in 1989. He made his major league debut with Seattle in September 1990. He led major league rookies with 12 wins in 1991, but led the Mariners with 13 losses, with a 5.09 ERA in 182 innings, more than twice his workload in any other MLB season. He moved to a long relief role in 1992. He dealt with a shoulder injury in 1993.

Seattle waived DeLucia ahead of the 1994 season, and he signed with the Cincinnati Reds, pitching most of the season in Triple-A. After signing a minor league contract with the Baltimore Orioles that November, the St. Louis Cardinals selected him in the Rule 5 draft. He had a 3.39 ERA in 82 1/3 innings. After the season, St. Louis traded him to the San Francisco Giants as part of a five-player trade sending Royce Clayton to the Cardinals.

In April 1997, the Giants traded DeLucia to the Anaheim Angels for minor leaguer Travis Thurmond. DeLucia was ejected and suspended two games after hitting Dean Palmer with a pitch during a June 1998 game that had two bench-clearing brawls. In a ten-season MLB career, DeLucia posted a 4.62 ERA with 502 strikeouts over 624 innings. He continued to pitch in the minors in 2000 and 2001.

== Post-playing career ==
After his playing career, DeLucia was a minor league pitching coach in 2002 and 2003. He has also worked as a scout for the Los Angeles Dodgers. He founded a baseball training facility in Shillington, Pennsylvania, selling the company in 2023 while continuing to work as an instructor.
