= Reggie Jefferson =

American baseball player (born 1968)

- Designated hitter / First baseman
- Born: September 25, 1968 (age 57); Tallahassee, Florida, U.S.
- Batted: Left Threw: Left

Professional debut
- MLB: May 18, 1991, for the Cincinnati Reds
- NPB: April 1, 2000, for the Seibu Lions

Last appearance
- MLB: October 3, 1999, for the Boston Red Sox
- NPB: August 25, 2000, for the Seibu Lions

MLB statistics
- Batting average: .300
- Home runs: 72
- Runs batted in: 300

NPB statistics
- Batting average: .260
- Home runs: 10
- Runs batted in: 48
- Stats at Baseball Reference

Teams
- Cincinnati Reds (1991); Cleveland Indians (1991–1993); Seattle Mariners (1994); Boston Red Sox (1995–1999); Seibu Lions (2000)

Reginald "Reg" Jirod Jefferson (born September 25, 1968) is an American former professional baseball designated hitter. He played in Major League Baseball (MLB) from 1991 to 1999 for the Cincinnati Reds, Cleveland Indians, Seattle Mariners and the Boston Red Sox.

== Playing career ==
Jefferson attended Lincoln High School in Tallahassee, Florida. He was a three-sport star, lettering in baseball, basketball and football.

The Cincinnati Reds drafted Jefferson in the third round of the 1986 MLB draft. He missed most of the 1987 season with a shin fracture. He was a Midwest League All-Star in 1988. His 1990 season ended in May with a stress fracture in his back. He made his MLB debut with Cincinnati early in the 1991 season. He went 1-for-7 with a home run. The Reds traded Jefferson to the Cleveland Indians for Tim Costo on June 11. After the trade, Jefferson dealt with pneumonia and a pulled chest muscle. He hit .194 in his first MLB season, the lowest in his career. He spent most of 1992 in the minors, batting. 230 with Cleveland in July then .380 as a September call-up.

Jefferson was traded in December 1993 by Cleveland to Seattle with Félix Fermín and cash for shortstop Omar Vizquel. Beginning in 1994, Jefferson stopped being a switch hitter. He hit .327 in 63 games in his single season with Seattle.

Jefferson signed with the Boston Red Sox in April 1995. He dealt with a back injury that season. In 1996, he hit .347 which would have been third highest in the league if not for falling short in at-bats needed and was given the nickname 'The Miracle' by faithful Red Sox fans. Unable to hit left-handed pitchers, he was left off the 1999 playoff roster as a result. Jefferson would never play major league baseball again.

In 680 games over nine seasons, Jefferson posted a .300 batting average with 285 runs, 131 doubles, 11 triples, 72 home runs, 300 RBI, 146 bases on balls, .349 on-base percentage and .474 slugging percentage. He also played one season in Japan for the Seibu Lions in 2000, receiving a contract of more than $1 million.

== Post-playing career ==
Jefferson has also served as a player agent. He was the hitting coach of the Albuquerque Isotopes in 2005 and the University of South Florida (USF) in 2006. He earned a degree in business administration from USF in 2003.

== Personal life ==
Jefferson is married and has four children.
