= Cho Jin-ho (baseball) =

South Korean baseball player (born 1975)

- Starting pitcher
- Born: August 16, 1975 (age 50); Jeonju, North Jeolla Province, South Korea
- Batted: Right Threw: Right

Professional debut
- MLB: July 4, 1998, for the Boston Red Sox
- KBO: April 9, 2003, for the SK Wyverns

Last appearance
- MLB: July 30, 1999, for the Boston Red Sox
- KBO: 2009, for the Samsung Lions

MLB statistics
- Win–loss record: 2–6
- Earned run average: 6.52
- Strikeouts: 31

KBO statistics
- Win–loss record: 5–9
- Earned run average: 5.99
- Strikeouts: 39
- Stats at Baseball Reference

Teams
- As player: Boston Red Sox (1998–1999); SK Wyverns (2003); Samsung Lions (2008–2009); As coach: Samsung Lions (2014–present)

- Cho Jin-ho
- Hangul: 조진호
- RR: Jo Jinho
- MR: Cho Chinho
- IPA: [tɕo.dʑin.ɦo]

Cho Jin-ho (Korean: 조진호; born August 16, 1975) is a South Korean professional baseball pitcher who briefly played for the Boston Red Sox.

Cho played parts of the 1998 and 1999 MLB seasons with the Boston Red Sox, pitching in 13 games and recording two wins and six losses with a 6.52 earned run average.

After finishing the 2002 season with the Pawtucket Red Sox (AAA) of the International League, Cho returned to South Korea, signing with the SK Wyverns of the KBO League. Cho had an unsuccessful 2003 with the club and in 2004 was caught in a scheme to dodge military service. He spent several years in prison and non-combat military service before returning to the mound for the Samsung Lions in 2007.

== Education ==
- Wonkwang University
- Jeonju High School
- Jeolla Middle School
- Jeonju Jinbuk Elementary School
