= Jim Parque =

American baseball player (born 1975)

- Pitcher
- Born: February 8, 1975 (age 51); Norwalk, California, U.S.
- Batted: Left Threw: Left

MLB debut
- May 26, 1998, for the Chicago White Sox

Last MLB appearance
- May 21, 2003, for the Tampa Bay Devil Rays

MLB statistics
- Win–loss record: 31–34
- Earned run average: 5.42
- Strikeouts: 335
- Stats at Baseball Reference

Teams
- Chicago White Sox (1998–2002); Tampa Bay Devil Rays (2003)
Medals
Men's baseball
Representing United States
Olympics
Bronze medal – third place	1996 Atlanta	Team

James Vo Parque (/pɑːrˈkeɪ/ par-KAY; born February 8, 1975) is an American former professional baseball pitcher. Parque played for the Chicago White Sox and Tampa Bay Devil Rays of Major League Baseball (MLB) from 1998 to 2003.

== Career ==
=== Amateur career ===
==== High school ====
Jim Parque grew up poor in Southern California. His father made less than US$20,000 per year and his mother, a Vietnamese immigrant, worked at a textiles factory in Chinatown, Los Angeles. On this income, Parque's parents struggled to provide for Parque and his brother. Parque himself had to work in a sweatshop in Los Angeles as a young boy.

Parque attended Crescenta Valley High School where he was mentored by former All-Star pitcher Jerry Reuss. As a senior, Parque compiled a 12–3 record and was voted the Pacific League Player of the Year and MVP. He also broke the school's strikeout record. Parque began his high school baseball career at 5'1" tall and roughly 110 pounds; the school was unable to find a jersey small enough to fit him. By the time he graduated high school, he still stood at only 5'5" and weighed 132 pounds. Although he was recruited by such college baseball teams as the USC Trojans, UCLA Bruins and Miami Hurricanes, professional scouts showed little interest in him because of his size. Parque was not selected until the 50th round of the 1994 Major League Baseball draft by the Los Angeles Dodgers.

==== College ====
From 1994 to 1997, Parque attended UCLA and led the Bruins to the College World Series in 1997. Parque earned second-team Smith Super Team honors in his sophomore season in 1996. In his junior year, Parque was voted first-team All-American by Baseball America, first-team All-Pac-10 Conference, second-team by the Sporting News, second-team by the American Baseball Coaches Association, and third-team by Collegiate Baseball. Parque is one of the most decorated pitchers in UCLA Baseball history. He currently ranks second in career games started with 50, second in career total innings pitched with 334 2/3 innings, second in career strikeouts with 319, third in career pitching wins with 25, and seventh in career complete games with 10. In terms of single season pitching records for the Bruins, Parque ranks third in wins with 13 in 1997, ninth for games started with 19 in 1997, ninth for innings pitched with 125 2/3 in 1996, fourth in strikeouts with 119 in 1997, and fifth in strikeouts with 116 in 1996.

=== Professional career ===
==== Chicago White Sox ====
In the 1997 supplemental draft, he was drafted by the Chicago White Sox in the 1st round. Parque made his major league debut the following year, pitching in 21 starts for the White Sox. He had an ERA of 5.10 with a 7-5 record in 113 innings.

In 1999, Parque finished the season with a 9-15 record in 30 starts.

He enjoyed his best season in 2000, going 13–6 with a 4.28 ERA in 33 games (32 starts). Parque made his only postseason appearance starting game one against the Seattle Mariners in the ALDS. Parque outdueled Freddy Garcia in the performance, allowing 3 runs on 6 hits in 6 innings, but the bullpen blew the lead and the game in ten innings.

The 2001 season saw Parque pitch in 5 starts only after suffering a shoulder injury, which sidelined him for the rest of the season. The injury limited Parque to just 53.1 innings between 2001 and 2002 for the Chicago White Sox and spent most of those years in the minor leagues or rehabilitating his injured shoulder. Parque was released by the Chicago White Sox after the 2002 season.

==== Tampa Bay Devil Rays ====
Parque signed a minor league with the Tampa Bay Devil Rays in 2003. He was released after posting a whopping 11.94 ERA in 5 starts. Parque failed to pitch out of the third inning in three of those five starts, but did spin a quality start against the Detroit Tigers on May 9, allowing just one hit (and four walks) through six innings for what would be his last Major League win.

==== Arizona Diamondbacks ====
In January, 2004, Parque signed a minor league deal with the Arizona Diamondbacks; however, he never appeared with the Major League team. After 50 innings with the AAA Tucson Sidewinders, Parque announced his retirement citing his recurring arm injury from 2000.

==== Return to baseball ====
After being out of baseball for three years, Parque announced his willingness to return to the game of baseball. He started his return by instructing lessons for the Cook County Cheetas in Oak Lawn. The Chicago Tribune reported that he threw his fastball in the range of 90 mph. On February 2, 2007, he signed a minor league contract with the Seattle Mariners. He was released by Seattle after 45 uninspiring innings on May 31, 2007. He has since been linked to steroids in December 2007, though he denied the account in the Seattle Times. In a July 23, 2009 article in the Chicago Sun-Times, Parque admitted using human growth hormone while rehabbing from a shoulder injury in 2003. At the time, HGH had not yet been banned by MLB.

== See also ==
- List of Major League Baseball players named in the Mitchell Report
