= Brian Rose (baseball) =

American baseball player (born 1976)

- Pitcher
- Born: February 13, 1976 (age 50); Dartmouth, Massachusetts, U.S.
- Batted: Right Threw: Right

MLB debut
- July 25, 1997, for the Boston Red Sox

Last MLB appearance
- May 30, 2001, for the Tampa Bay Devil Rays

MLB statistics
- Win–loss record: 15–23
- Earned run average: 5.86
- Strikeouts: 151
- Stats at Baseball Reference

Teams
- Boston Red Sox (1997–2000); Colorado Rockies (2000); New York Mets (2001); Tampa Bay Devil Rays (2001)

Brian Leonard Rose (born February 13, 1976) is an American former professional baseball player. He was a pitcher in Major League Baseball (MLB) for four different teams from 1997 to 2001, primarily the Boston Red Sox. Listed at 6 feet 3 inches (1.91 m) and 215 pounds (98 kg), he threw and batted right-handed.

== Biography ==
Rose played high school baseball and was named the Gatorade Massachusetts Player of the Year in his senior year at Dartmouth High School. To date, his uniform number 19 is one of just three to be retired by Dartmouth High School and his jersey now hangs in the Carlin Lynch Memorial Gymnasium.

Rose was drafted in the third round of the 1994 MLB draft by the Boston Red Sox. In the process, he turned down several scholarship offers, including a baseball scholarship to the University of Michigan. Rose had an 11-season Minor League Baseball career, winning the International League Most Valuable Pitcher Award in 1997. He pitched in 68 major league games (54 starts) between July 1997 and May 2001, registering a career earned run average of 5.86 with a 15–23 win–loss record. Rose also spent time in the Tampa Bay Rays, Colorado Rockies, New York Mets, Cincinnati Reds, and Kansas City Royals organizations.

Since retiring from his baseball career, Rose is employed by the office of the Bristol County, Massachusetts District Attorney, where he leads community affairs endeavors. He served as the pitching coach the New Bedford Bay Sox of the New England Collegiate Baseball League. At the high school level, Rose has coached the Bishop Stang High School varsity baseball team since 2016. He has also coached ice hockey at Dartmouth High School. Rose volunteers with the Boys & Girls Club of Fall River, Massachusetts, and helps out at their Camp Welch facility in Assonet, Massachusetts. He has also runs his own baseball camp.
