= 1999 Major League Baseball season =

1999 MLB season
- League: Major League Baseball
- Sport: Baseball
- Duration: April 4 – October 27, 1999
- Games: 162
- Teams: 30
- TV partner(s): Fox/FSN; ESPN; NBC

Draft
- Top draft pick: Josh Hamilton
- Picked by: Tampa Bay Devil Rays

Regular Season
- Season MVP: AL: Iván Rodríguez (TEX); NL: Chipper Jones (ATL)

Postseason
- AL champions: New York Yankees
- AL runners-up: Boston Red Sox
- NL champions: Atlanta Braves
- NL runners-up: New York Mets

World Series
- Champions: New York Yankees
- Runners-up: Atlanta Braves
- World Series MVP: Mariano Rivera (NYY)

MLB seasons
- ← 1998 2000 →

Locations of teams for the 1999 American League season
West Central East
Locations of teams for the 1998–1999 National League seasons
West Central East

The 1999 Major League Baseball season ended with the New York Yankees sweeping the Atlanta Braves in the World Series.

The previous record of most home runs hit in a season, set at 5,064 in 1998, was broken once again as the American League and National League combined to hit 5,528 home runs. Moreover, it was the first season in 49 years to feature a team that scored 1,000 runs in a season, as the Cleveland Indians led the Majors with 1,009 runs scored. Only 193 shutouts were recorded in 2,427 regular-season games. The 1999 season was the first season in which the two current New York City-area MLB teams, the Yankees and Mets, qualified for the playoffs together in the same season. The following season, both teams reached the World Series and the Yankees won four games to one.

== Standings ==
=== American League ===
AL East
| Team | W | L | Pct. | GB | Home | Road |
|---|---|---|---|---|---|---|
| ^{(1)} New York Yankees | 98 | 64 | .605 | — | 48‍–‍33 | 50‍–‍31 |
| ^{(4)} Boston Red Sox | 94 | 68 | .580 | 4 | 49‍–‍32 | 45‍–‍36 |
| Toronto Blue Jays | 84 | 78 | .519 | 14 | 40‍–‍41 | 44‍–‍37 |
| Baltimore Orioles | 78 | 84 | .481 | 20 | 41‍–‍40 | 37‍–‍44 |
| Tampa Bay Devil Rays | 69 | 93 | .426 | 29 | 33‍–‍48 | 36‍–‍45 |

AL Central
| Team | W | L | Pct. | GB | Home | Road |
|---|---|---|---|---|---|---|
| ^{(2)} Cleveland Indians | 97 | 65 | .599 | — | 47‍–‍34 | 50‍–‍31 |
| Chicago White Sox | 75 | 86 | .466 | 21½ | 38‍–‍42 | 37‍–‍44 |
| Detroit Tigers | 69 | 92 | .429 | 27½ | 38‍–‍43 | 31‍–‍49 |
| Kansas City Royals | 64 | 97 | .398 | 32½ | 33‍–‍47 | 31‍–‍50 |
| Minnesota Twins | 63 | 97 | .394 | 33 | 31‍–‍50 | 32‍–‍47 |

AL West
| Team | W | L | Pct. | GB | Home | Road |
|---|---|---|---|---|---|---|
| ^{(3)} Texas Rangers | 95 | 67 | .586 | — | 51‍–‍30 | 44‍–‍37 |
| Oakland Athletics | 87 | 75 | .537 | 8 | 52‍–‍29 | 35‍–‍46 |
| Seattle Mariners | 79 | 83 | .488 | 16 | 43‍–‍38 | 36‍–‍45 |
| Anaheim Angels | 70 | 92 | .432 | 25 | 37‍–‍44 | 33‍–‍48 |

=== National League ===
NL East
| Team | W | L | Pct. | GB | Home | Road |
|---|---|---|---|---|---|---|
| ^{(1)} Atlanta Braves | 103 | 59 | .636 | — | 56‍–‍25 | 47‍–‍34 |
| ^{(4)} New York Mets | 97 | 66 | .595 | 6½ | 49‍–‍32 | 48‍–‍34 |
| Philadelphia Phillies | 77 | 85 | .475 | 26 | 41‍–‍40 | 36‍–‍45 |
| Montreal Expos | 68 | 94 | .420 | 35 | 35‍–‍46 | 33‍–‍48 |
| Florida Marlins | 64 | 98 | .395 | 39 | 35‍–‍45 | 29‍–‍53 |

NL Central
| Team | W | L | Pct. | GB | Home | Road |
|---|---|---|---|---|---|---|
| ^{(3)} Houston Astros | 97 | 65 | .599 | — | 50‍–‍32 | 47‍–‍33 |
| Cincinnati Reds | 96 | 67 | .589 | 1½ | 45‍–‍37 | 51‍–‍30 |
| Pittsburgh Pirates | 78 | 83 | .484 | 18½ | 45‍–‍36 | 33‍–‍47 |
| St. Louis Cardinals | 75 | 86 | .466 | 21½ | 38‍–‍42 | 37‍–‍44 |
| Milwaukee Brewers | 74 | 87 | .460 | 22½ | 32‍–‍48 | 42‍–‍39 |
| Chicago Cubs | 67 | 95 | .414 | 30 | 34‍–‍47 | 33‍–‍48 |

NL West
| Team | W | L | Pct. | GB | Home | Road |
|---|---|---|---|---|---|---|
| ^{(2)} Arizona Diamondbacks | 100 | 62 | .617 | — | 52‍–‍29 | 48‍–‍33 |
| San Francisco Giants | 86 | 76 | .531 | 14 | 49‍–‍32 | 37‍–‍44 |
| Los Angeles Dodgers | 77 | 85 | .475 | 23 | 37‍–‍44 | 40‍–‍41 |
| San Diego Padres | 74 | 88 | .457 | 26 | 46‍–‍35 | 28‍–‍53 |
| Colorado Rockies | 72 | 90 | .444 | 28 | 39‍–‍42 | 33‍–‍48 |

- The New York Mets defeated the Cincinnati Reds in a one-game playoff to earn the NL Wild Card.

== Postseason ==
=== Bracket ===
Division Series (ALDS, NLDS)
1 | NY Yankees | 3
3 | Texas | 0
American League
2 | Cleveland | 2
4 | Boston | 3
1 | Atlanta | 3
3 | Houston | 1
National League
2 | Arizona | 1
4 | NY Mets | 3

League Championship Series (NLCS, ALCS)
1 | NY Yankees | 4
4 | Boston | 1
1 | Atlanta | 4
4 | NY Mets | 2

World Series
AL1 | NY Yankees | 4
NL1 | Atlanta | 0

Note: Two teams in the same division could not meet in the division series.

== Awards and honors ==
- Baseball Hall of Fame
  - George Brett
  - Orlando Cepeda
  - Nestor Chylak
  - Nolan Ryan
  - Frank Selee
  - Joe Williams
  - Robin Yount

Baseball Writers' Association of America Awards
| BBWAA Award | National League | American League |
|---|---|---|
| Rookie of the Year | Scott Williamson (CIN) | Carlos Beltrán (KC) |
| Cy Young Award | Randy Johnson (AZ) | Pedro Martínez (BOS) |
| Manager of the Year | Jack McKeon (CIN) | Jimy Williams (BOS) |
| Most Valuable Player | Chipper Jones (ATL) | Iván Rodríguez (TEX) |
Gold Glove Awards
| Position | National League | American League |
| Pitcher | Greg Maddux (ATL) | Mike Mussina (BAL) |
| Catcher | Mike Lieberthal (PHI) | Iván Rodríguez (TEX) |
| First Baseman | J. T. Snow (SF) | Rafael Palmeiro (TEX) |
| Second Baseman | Pokey Reese (CIN) | Roberto Alomar (CLE) |
| Third Baseman | Robin Ventura (NYM) | Scott Brosius (NYY) |
| Shortstop | Rey Ordonez (NYM) | Omar Vizquel (CLE) |
| Outfielders | Steve Finley (AZ) | Bernie Williams (NYY) |
| Outfielders | Larry Walker (COL) | Shawn Green (TOR) |
| Outfielders | Andruw Jones (ATL) | Ken Griffey Jr. (SEA) |
Silver Slugger Awards
| Pitcher/Designated Hitter | Mike Hampton (HOU) | Rafael Palmeiro (TEX) |
| Catcher | Mike Piazza (NYM) | Iván Rodríguez (TEX) |
| First Baseman | Jeff Bagwell (HOU) | Carlos Delgado (TOR) |
| Second Baseman | Edgardo Alfonzo (NYM) | Roberto Alomar (CLE) |
| Third Baseman | Chipper Jones (ATL) | Dean Palmer (DET) |
| Shortstop | Barry Larkin (CIN) | Alex Rodriguez (SEA) |
| Outfielders | Sammy Sosa (CHC) | Shawn Green (TOR) |
| Outfielders | Vladimir Guerrero (MON) | Ken Griffey Jr. (SEA) |
| Outfielders | Larry Walker (COL) | Manny Ramirez (CLE) |

=== Other awards ===
- Outstanding Designated Hitter Award: Rafael Palmeiro (TEX)
- Hank Aaron Award: Manny Ramirez (CLE, American); Sammy Sosa (CHC, National).
- Roberto Clemente Award (Humanitarian): Tony Gwynn (SD).
- Rolaids Relief Man Award: Mariano Rivera (NYY, American); Billy Wagner (HOU, National).
- Warren Spahn Award (Best left-handed pitcher): Randy Johnson (AZ)

=== Player of the Month ===
| Month | American League | National League |
|---|---|---|
| April | Manny Ramirez | Matt Williams |
| May | Nomar Garciaparra | Sammy Sosa |
| June | Rafael Palmeiro | Jeromy Burnitz |
| July | Joe Randa | Mark McGwire |
| August | Rafael Palmeiro; Iván Rodríguez | Vladimir Guerrero |
| September | Albert Belle | Greg Vaughn |

=== Pitcher of the Month ===
| Month | American League | National League |
|---|---|---|
| April | Pedro Martínez | John Smoltz |
| May | Pedro Martínez | Curt Schilling |
| June | Pedro Martínez | Al Leiter |
| July | Hideki Irabu | Randy Johnson |
| August | Mariano Rivera | Greg Maddux |
| September | Pedro Martínez | Denny Neagle |

== MLB statistical leaders ==
| Statistic | American League | | National League | |
|---|---|---|---|---|
| AVG | Nomar Garciaparra BOS | .357 | Larry Walker COL | .379 |
| HR | Ken Griffey Jr. SEA | 48 | Mark McGwire STL | 65 |
| RBI | Manny Ramírez CLE | 165 | Mark McGwire STL | 147 |
| Wins | Pedro Martínez^{1} BOS | 23 | Mike Hampton HOU | 22 |
| ERA | Pedro Martínez^{1} BOS | 2.07 | Randy Johnson AZ | 2.48 |
| SO | Pedro Martínez^{1} BOS | 313 | Randy Johnson AZ | 364 |
| SV | Mariano Rivera NYY | 45 | Ugueth Urbina MON | 41 |
| SB | Brian Hunter DET/SEA | 44 | Tony Womack AZ | 72 |

^{1}American League Triple Crown Pitching Winner

== Managers ==
=== American League ===
| Team | Manager | Comments |
|---|---|---|
| Anaheim Angels | Terry Collins, Joe Maddon | Collins (51–82, .383), Maddon (19–10, .655) |
| Baltimore Orioles | Ray Miller | |
| Boston Red Sox | Jimy Williams | |
| Chicago White Sox | Jerry Manuel | |
| Cleveland Indians | Mike Hargrove | |
| Detroit Tigers | Larry Parrish | |
| Kansas City Royals | Tony Muser | |
| Minnesota Twins | Tom Kelly | |
| New York Yankees | Joe Torre | Won the World Series |
| Oakland Athletics | Art Howe | |
| Seattle Mariners | Lou Piniella | |
| Tampa Bay Devil Rays | Larry Rothschild | |
| Texas Rangers | Johnny Oates | |
| Toronto Blue Jays | Jim Fregosi | |

=== National League ===
| Team | Manager | Comments |
|---|---|---|
| Arizona Diamondbacks | Buck Showalter | |
| Atlanta Braves | Bobby Cox | Won National League pennant |
| Chicago Cubs | Jim Riggleman | |
| Cincinnati Reds | Jack McKeon | |
| Colorado Rockies | Jim Leyland | |
| Florida Marlins | John Boles Jr. | |
| Houston Astros | Larry Dierker, Matt Galante | Dierker (84–51, .622), Galante (13–14, .481) |
| Los Angeles Dodgers | Davey Johnson | |
| Milwaukee Brewers | Phil Garner, Jim Lefebvre | Garner (52–60, .464), Lefebvre (22–27, .449) |
| Montreal Expos | Felipe Alou | |
| New York Mets | Bobby Valentine | |
| Philadelphia Phillies | Terry Francona | |
| Pittsburgh Pirates | Gene Lamont | |
| St. Louis Cardinals | Tony La Russa | |
| San Diego Padres | Bruce Bochy | |
| San Francisco Giants | Dusty Baker | |

== Home field attendance and payroll ==
| Team name | Wins | %± | Home attendance | %± | Per game | Est. payroll | %± |
|---|---|---|---|---|---|---|---|
| Colorado Rockies | 72 | −6.5% | 3,481,065 | −8.2% | 42,976 | $61,935,837 | 22.7% |
| Cleveland Indians | 97 | 9.0% | 3,468,456 | 0.0% | 42,820 | $73,679,962 | 19.4% |
| Baltimore Orioles | 78 | −1.3% | 3,433,150 | −6.8% | 42,385 | $80,805,863 | 11.4% |
| New York Yankees | 98 | −14.0% | 3,292,736 | 11.4% | 40,651 | $86,934,359 | 30.1% |
| Atlanta Braves | 103 | −2.8% | 3,284,897 | −2.3% | 40,554 | $73,341,000 | 19.9% |
| St. Louis Cardinals | 75 | −9.6% | 3,225,334 | 0.9% | 40,317 | $49,988,195 | −8.6% |
| Los Angeles Dodgers | 77 | −7.2% | 3,095,346 | 0.2% | 38,214 | $81,062,453 | 66.0% |
| Arizona Diamondbacks | 100 | 53.8% | 3,019,654 | −16.4% | 37,280 | $68,703,999 | 112.4% |
| Seattle Mariners^{[a]} | 79 | 3.9% | 2,916,346 | 10.0% | 36,004 | $54,125,003 | −1.2% |
| Chicago Cubs | 67 | −25.6% | 2,813,854 | 7.3% | 34,739 | $62,343,000 | 22.6% |
| Texas Rangers | 95 | 8.0% | 2,771,469 | −5.3% | 34,216 | $76,709,931 | 35.2% |
| New York Mets | 97 | 10.2% | 2,725,668 | 19.1% | 33,650 | $68,852,092 | 31.8% |
| Houston Astros | 97 | −4.9% | 2,706,017 | 10.1% | 33,000 | $55,114,000 | 30.1% |
| San Diego Padres | 74 | −24.5% | 2,523,538 | −1.3% | 31,155 | $49,768,179 | 6.2% |
| Boston Red Sox | 94 | 2.2% | 2,446,162 | 5.7% | 30,200 | $64,097,500 | 12.6% |
| Anaheim Angels | 70 | −17.6% | 2,253,123 | −10.6% | 27,816 | $55,633,166 | 33.1% |
| Toronto Blue Jays | 84 | −4.5% | 2,163,464 | −11.9% | 26,709 | $45,444,333 | −11.5% |
| San Francisco Giants | 86 | −3.4% | 2,078,399 | 7.9% | 25,659 | $46,798,057 | 9.5% |
| Cincinnati Reds | 96 | 24.7% | 2,061,222 | 14.9% | 25,137 | $33,962,761 | 47.6% |
| Detroit Tigers | 69 | 6.2% | 2,026,441 | 43.8% | 25,018 | $36,689,666 | 51.2% |
| Philadelphia Phillies | 77 | 2.7% | 1,825,337 | 6.4% | 22,535 | $31,897,500 | −12.1% |
| Milwaukee Brewers | 74 | 0.0% | 1,701,796 | −6.1% | 21,272 | $43,377,395 | 27.1% |
| Pittsburgh Pirates | 78 | 13.0% | 1,638,023 | 4.9% | 20,223 | $25,047,666 | 66.3% |
| Tampa Bay Devil Rays | 69 | 9.5% | 1,562,827 | −37.6% | 19,294 | $38,870,000 | 42.5% |
| Kansas City Royals | 64 | −11.1% | 1,506,068 | 0.7% | 18,826 | $26,660,000 | −30.0% |
| Oakland Athletics | 87 | 17.6% | 1,434,610 | 16.4% | 17,711 | $24,831,833 | 15.6% |
| Florida Marlins | 64 | 18.5% | 1,369,421 | −20.9% | 17,118 | $21,085,000 | −49.6% |
| Chicago White Sox | 75 | −6.3% | 1,338,851 | −3.8% | 16,529 | $25,820,000 | −35.2% |
| Minnesota Twins | 63 | −10.0% | 1,202,829 | 3.2% | 14,850 | $22,107,500 | −21.3% |
| Montreal Expos | 68 | 4.6% | 773,277 | −15.5% | 9,547 | $17,903,000 | 68.2% |

^a The Seattle Mariners played their home games at The Kingdome from the start of the season until June 27. They then played the remainder of the season at T-Mobile Park (then Safeco Field)

== Television coverage ==
This was the fourth season under the five-year rights agreements with ESPN, Fox and NBC. ESPN continued to air Sunday Night Baseball and Wednesday Night Baseball. Fox's coverage included Fox Saturday Baseball broadcasts, Thursday night games on Fox Sports Net, Saturday primetime games on FX and the All-Star Game. During the postseason, ESPN, Fox and NBC split the four Division Series. Fox then televised the American League Championship Series while NBC aired both the National League Championship Series and the World Series.

== Events ==
=== January–March ===
- January 5 – Nolan Ryan, George Brett and Robin Yount are elected to the Baseball Hall of Fame by the Baseball Writers' Association of America. It is the first time since 1936 that three players are elected simultaneously on their first try. Carlton Fisk finishes 4th in the voting, missing election by 43 votes.
- February 15 – The Cincinnati Reds announce that they are dropping their long-standing policy of no facial hair for players. The change is the result of a talk between outgoing Reds owner Marge Schott and newly acquired outfielder Greg Vaughn.
- February 18 – The U.S. Postal Service issues a Jackie Robinson stamp as part of their "Celebrate the Century" program. Robinson was selected to represent the 1940s, and is the second baseball player chosen. Babe Ruth, in May 1998, represented the 1920s.
- February 18 – The Yankees end the trade rumors by acquiring Cy Young Award winner Roger Clemens from the Toronto Blue Jays in exchange for pitchers David Wells and Graeme Lloyd, and infielder Homer Bush.
- February 21 – Florida Marlins rookie third baseman Mike Lowell, acquired from the New York Yankees on February 1, undergoes surgery for testicular cancer after a small mass is found during a routine exam.
- March 2 – Orlando Cepeda, Frank Selee, Smokey Joe Williams and Nestor Chylak are elected to the Hall of Fame by the Veterans Committee.
- March 7 – In a historic agreement, it is announced that the Baltimore Orioles will travel to Cuba for a March 28 exhibition game against the Cuba national team in Havana. The Cuban team will travel to the US for a return contest at a future date. It is the first time in 40 years that Americans will play a professional game in Cuba.
- March 8 – Joe DiMaggio passes away at the age of 84.
- March 10 – Yankees manager Joe Torre is diagnosed with prostate cancer. While he is undergoing treatment, the team will be run by coach Don Zimmer.
- March 28 – The Orioles make the first visit to Cuba by major leaguers since 1959, and defeat a team of Cuban amateurs by a score of 3–2 in 11 innings. Pitcher José Contreras hurls eight innings of 2–hit, 10–K ball in relief for the Cubans, while catcher Charles Johnson hits a two–run home run, and DH Harold Baines drives in the winning run for the Orioles. The two teams will play a rematch at Camden Yards in Baltimore on May 3.

=== April–June ===
- April 4 – In the first regular-season game ever played outside of the United States or Canada, the Colorado Rockies open the season by defeating the San Diego Padres 8–2, before an overflow crowd of 27,104 in Monterrey, Mexico. Outfielder Dante Bichette has four hits, including a home run, and four RBI for the winners. Local hero Vinny Castilla also has four hits for the Rockies, while Darryl Kile picks up the victory.
- April 19 – The Baltimore Orioles' Cal Ripken Jr. is placed on the disabled list for the first time in his 19-year career because of irritation in his lower back. Ripken's record consecutive game streak ended in September 1998 at 2,632.
- April 20 – Cincinnati Reds owner Marge Schott agrees to sell her controlling interest in the Reds to a group headed by Carl H. Lindner, ending her 14-year tenure. The group will pay a total of $67 million.
- April 20 – The Nolan Ryan Museum opens in Alvin, Texas.
- April 23 – The St. Louis Cardinals defeat the Los Angeles Dodgers 12–5, as third baseman Fernando Tatís sets a major league record by hitting two grand slams in a single inning. His two homers come in St. Louis' 11–run third inning. He also sets a record with eight RBI in the inning, while Dodgers pitcher Chan Ho Park becomes the first 20th century pitcher – and only the second ever – to surrender two grand slams in a single frame (Bill Phillips of the Pittsburgh Pirates did so in 1890). Park became the 36th major-leaguer to serve up two slams to the same player in his career.
- April 23 – The Brewers sink the Pirates 9–1, as pitcher Steve Woodard hurls the complete game victory. The win ends Milwaukee's NL record streak of 113 games without a complete game.
- May 3 – In a 12–11, 10-inning loss to the Oakland Athletics, Boston Red Sox rookie Creighton Gubanich becomes only the fourth player to hit a grand slam for his first major league hit.
- May 3 – The Pirates defeat the Giants 9–8, despite Jeff Kent getting five hits for the Giants and hits for the cycle, just the second player to do so in Three Rivers Stadium; Joe Torre did it on June 27, 1973.
- May 9 – The Yankees defeat the Mariners 6–1. Relief pitcher Mike Stanton makes his first major league start for the Yankees, ending his major league record streak of 552 consecutive relief appearances prior to his first start. The previous record of 443 was set by Giants pitcher Gary Lavelle.
- May 10 – The Red Sox defeat the Mariners 12–4, as shortstop Nomar Garciaparra leads the way with three home runs, including two grand slams. Garciaparra drives home 10 of Boston's runs as he clouts a bases-loaded homer in the first inning, a 2-run shot in the third, and another grand slam in the 8th. He is the first Bosox since Jim Tabor in 1939 to hit two slams in a game, and just the 9th in major league history. Robin Ventura last did it, in 1995.
- May 17 – Tampa Bay outguns the Rangers 13–3, as first baseman Fred McGriff extends his major league record by hitting a home run in his 35th big league stadium: The Ballpark in Arlington.
- May 19 – In a record-setting outing, the Reds beat the Rockies 24–12, stroking 28 hits in the process. The 36 runs sets a Coors Field record. Jeffrey Hammonds hits three home runs for Cincinnati, as seven players in the Reds lineup get three or more hits apiece. Teammate Sean Casey hits a pair of 3-run homers to drive in six runs and reaches base in all seven plate appearances, tying a 20th-century record. The 36 runs scored in the contest is the third-highest total in the major leagues since the turn of the 20th century, while the 81 total bases set a new major league standard. Mike Cameron ties a major league mark with eight plate appearances in a nine-inning game. With 28 hits, the Reds tie a mark originally set on May 13, 1902, and tie the National League record with seven players with 3 or more hits (Pirates, June 12, 1928, and Reds, August 3, 1989). The Rockies also became the first team to score 12 or more runs in a game and lose by 12 or more runs in the same game since the Giants beat the Reds, 25–13 in 1901. Larry Walker extends his hitting streak to 20 games and raises his average to .431.
- May 20 – The Mets sweep the Brewers in a double header, winning the first game 11–10, and the second 10–1. Robin Ventura hits a grand slam in each contest, becoming the first player in major league history to do so in both ends of a doubleheader. Ventura also becomes the first player to hit a pair of grand slams on the same day on two separate occasions.
- May 22 – Steve Sparks, pitcher for the Anaheim Angels, tied a Major League record by becoming the sixth pitcher to hit three consecutive batters by pitch, the first since 1998, in a game against the Tampa Bay Devil Rays on May 22.
- May 26 - In one of the most heartbreaking moments in baseball history, during the third inning against the Texas Rangers, Tampa Bay Devil Rays starting pitcher Tony Saunders breaks and tears ligaments in his arm while pitching to batter Rafael Palmeiro. He would later break that same arm while playing a rehabilitation assignment in 2000, retiring from baseball. This was his last game as a major league player.
- June 25 – St. Louis defeats Arizona 1–0, as rookie pitcher José Jiménez hurls the first no-hitter of the season. The Cardinals score the lone run on a broken bat single with two outs in the ninth inning. Jiménez posted eight strikeouts in the contest, while losing pitcher Randy Johnson strike outs 14, including the 2500th of his career. Jiménez walks two and hits a batter in becoming the first rookie to toss a no-hitter since Wilson Álvarez in 1991.
- June 25 – In Baltimore's 9–8 loss to the Yankees, the Orioles' Jesse Orosco makes his 1,051st relief appearance to break Kent Tekulve's major league record.
- June 28 – Hack Wilson ups his runs batted in total for the 1930 season to 191. 69 years after the event, an RBI is added by the commissioner's office, which also gives Babe Ruth six additional walks, raising his career-record total to 2,062. "There is no doubt that Hack Wilson's RBI total should be 191", commissioner Bud Selig says. "I am sensitive to the historical significance that accompanies the correction of such a prestigious record, especially after so many years have passed, but it is important to get it right." The missing RBI came from the second game of a doubleheader between Wilson's Chicago Cubs and the Cincinnati Reds on July 28, 1930, where Charlie Grimm was credited with two RBI in the game and Wilson with none. Ruth's walks total is now 2,062. Ted Williams is second, trailing by 43, and Rickey Henderson is third, 134 behind Ruth.

=== July–September ===
- July 5 – The Cardinals defeat the Diamondbacks 1–0, as José Jiménez hurls a 2-hitter to defeat Randy Johnson. Jiménez no-hit the Diamondbacks in his last appearance against them (June 25). Johnson loses his third game in a row, during which Arizona has not scored a run and only recorded three hits. He strikes out 12 Cardinals to tie Dwight Gooden's NL mark of 43 strikeouts over three starts. He also reaches 200 strikeouts for the year and ends St. Louis rookie Joe McEwing's 25-game hitting streak, the 5th-longest ever for a rookie.
- July 6 – The White Sox lose to the Royals 8–7. Chicago outfielder Chris Singleton hits for the cycle, becoming the first rookie to do so since Oddibe McDowell in 1985 and just the 16th since 1900.
- July 9 – The uniform Lou Gehrig wore when he made his famous "luckiest man on earth" speech on July 4, 1939, is sold for $451,541 at auction. Leland's spokesman Marty Appel says the flannel pinstripe uniform worn by the Hall of Fame first baseman was purchased by a South Florida man who did not want his name made public. The winning bid was made over the phone. Yesterday, Carlton Fisk's home run ball that won Game Six of the 1975 World Series for the Boston Red Sox was sold for $113,273.
- July 13 – The Major League Baseball All-Century Team is announced prior to the All-Star Game at Boston's Fenway Park. Many members of the team, including Bob Gibson, Mike Schmidt, Willie Mays, Brooks Robinson, and Ted Williams, are on the field for the festivities. Williams, who threw out the first pitch, delayed the start of the game for about 15 minutes as players from both teams surrounded him in a spontaneous display of homage. The American League goes on to defeat the National League 4–1, behind Red Sox pitcher Pedro Martínez. Martinez is named the game's MVP as he strikes out five out of the six batters he faced including the first four in a row in his two innings of work.
- July 15 – Outdoor baseball returns to Seattle as the Mariners open Safeco Field, but lose to the San Diego Padres 3–2 with 44,607 in attendance. It was the first park in MLB history to host an interleague game on its inaugural day.
- July 18 – David Cone pitches the 16th perfect game against the Montreal Expos, in a 6–0 New York Yankees victory. It is the third perfect game in franchise history. Don Larsen who authored the first one 43 years prior, throws out the ceremonial first pitch to battery mate Yogi Berra.
- July 25 – George Brett, Robin Yount, Nolan Ryan and Orlando Cepeda are inducted into the Hall of Fame in Cooperstown.
- August 5 – San Diego defeat the Cardinals 10–3, despite a pair of home runs by Mark McGwire, including the 500th of his career. McGwire becomes the first player in history to hit his 400th and 500th homers in successive seasons.
- August 6 – The San Diego Padres' Tony Gwynn raps his 3,000th career hit, a single off Dan Smith of the Montreal Expos. The Padres defeat the Expos, 12–10.
- August 7 – Just one day after Tony Gwynn reaches the historic milestone, the Devil Rays' Wade Boggs also gets the 3,000th hit of his career (a home run) in Tampa Bay's 15–10 loss to Cleveland.
- August 9 – A total of five grand slams are hit on the day, marking the first time it has happened in 129 years of major league baseball. The bases loaded pokes are hit by Fernando Tatís (St. Louis, against Philadelphia), José Vidro (Montreal, against San Diego), Mike Lowell (Florida, against San Francisco), Bernie Williams (Yankees, against Oakland) and Jay Buhner (Seattle, against the White Sox).
- August 17 – Sic transit gloria. St. Louis sends José Jiménez to AAA Memphis less than two months after his no-hitter against Arizona. He joins Bobo Holloman as the only pitcher to go to the minors in the same year he pitched a no-hitter.
- August 30 – The Mets roll over the Astros 17–1, as Edgardo Alfonzo goes 6-for-6, a club record, with a double, three home runs, five RBI and six runs scored. The six runs scored ties the modern major league mark. Alfonzo is only the 5th player ever to hit three home runs while going 6-for-6.
- August 30 – Former player Billy Bean comes out of the closet and announces his homosexuality. He is the first living player to publicly acknowledge that he is gay.
- September 4 – In a 22–3 blowout over the Philadelphia Phillies, the Cincinnati Reds tie an NL record by hitting nine home runs in the contest: two 2 by Eddie Taubensee, and one apiece by Aaron Boone, Dmitri Young, Jeffrey Hammonds, Greg Vaughn, Pokey Reese, Brian Johnson and Mark Lewis.
- September 7 – Two native Canadian pitchers oppose each other as starters for the first time in 25 years. Florida Marlin pitcher Ryan Dempster, from British Columbia, faces off against Los Angeles Dodgers Éric Gagné, who hails from Quebec. The two roomed together while competing on Canada's national baseball team. The battle is a draw with neither pitcher getting the decision, but the Marlins win 2–1.
- September 9 – In a game between the Expos and the Padres, umpires nearly allowed 4 outs to be recorded in the 7th inning. Reggie Sanders of the Expos struck out for the third out, but the umpires, the fans, and the Padres allowed the Expos' Phil Nevin to come up to the plate and pitcher Ted Lilly to reach a 2–1 count before someone alerted home plate umpire Jerry Layne to the mistake. (Padres win 10–3)
- September 10 – The Red Sox trip the Yankees 3–1, as Pedro Martínez hurls an impressive one-hitter for his 21st victory of the year. Martinez strikes out 17 batters, the most Yankees ever fanned in a single game. Chili Davis' second-inning home run is NY's only hit. Chuck Knoblauch, hit by a pitch leading off the game, gives the Yankees their only other baserunner; he was caught stealing, so Martínez faces just one over the minimum.
- September 11 – The Twins defeat the Angels 7–0, as left-handed Eric Milton hurls the third no-hitter of the season.
- September 14 – Kansas City lose a doubleheader to the Angels, 8–6 in the opener and 6–5 in the nightcap. In the second game, KC outfielder Mark Quinn makes a memorable major league debut. After making out in his first at bat, Quinn doubles in his next trip to the plate, then hits home runs in his last two times up. He becomes just the third player in history to hit two home runs in his first big league game. Bob Nieman (1951) and Bert Campaneris (1964) are the only others to accomplish the feat.
- September 18 – The Brewers beat the Cubs, 7–4, as Sammy Sosa hits his 60th home run of the year. He becomes the first major leaguer to hit 60 homers twice.
- September 21 – The Red Sox defeat the Blue Jays, 3–0, as Pedro Martínez fans 12 for his 2second win. He joins Randy Johnson as the only pitchers to strike out at least 300 in both leagues, and breaks Roger Clemens' club mark of 291 strikeouts.
- September 26 – The Cardinals lose to the Reds 7–5, despite Mark McGwire's 60th home run of the season. McGwire joins Sammy Sosa as the only players in history to reach the 60 homer mark twice. He will end the season with 147 runs batted in on 145 hits, the only player in major league history (with 100 hits in a season) to have more RBI than hits. Jay Buhner, in 1995, came closest with 121 RBI and 123 hits.
- September 27 – The Tigers defeat the Royals 8–2 in the final game ever played at Tiger Stadium.
- September 30 – The Los Angeles Dodgers defeat the San Francisco Giants 9–4, in the final game ever played at Candlestick Park.

=== October–December ===
- October 2 – In a 3–2 Yankees victory over Tampa Bay, Bernie Williams draws his 100th walk of the season. He is the first player since John Olerud (1993) to reach 200 hits, 100 runs, 100 RBI and 100 walks in a season. Williams finishes with 202, 116, 115 and 100, respectively.
- October 3 – The Cardinals defeat the Cubs, 9–5, as both Mark McGwire and Sammy Sosa homer in their last game of the season. McGwire takes Steve Trachsel deep in the first inning and finishes with 65 home runs, with Sosa next in line with 63, homering in the third. McGwire's home run is his 52second, moving him past Ted Williams and Willie McCovey for 10th place on the all-time list. He finishes with 147 RBI on 145 hits, the first major league player ever to have more RBI than hits. Jay Buhner, in 1995, came closest with 121 RBI on 123 hits.
- October 9 – The Houston Astros play their last game at the historic Houston Astrodome as they prepare to move into Enron Field, located in downtown Houston, for the 2000 season.
- October 23 – The New York Yankees defeat the Atlanta Braves, 4–1, to win their 25th World Series. Roger Clemens gets the win, hurling 4-hit ball before leaving the game in the 8th inning. Mariano Rivera gets the save, his second of the Series. Jim Leyritz hits a solo home run in the 8th inning to finish the NY scoring. Rivera wins the Series MVP award.
- November 1 – The Cubs hire Atlanta Braves coach Don Baylor as their new manager.
- November 1 – The Indians hire hitting coach Charlie Manuel as their new manager.
- November 17 – The Angels hire Mike Scioscia as their new manager.
- December 5 – Major League Baseball and ESPN agree to settle their lawsuit by signing a new 6-year, $800 million deal. The suit involved ESPN's decision to give National Football League games priority over late-season Sunday night baseball games on its main channel.

== Deaths ==
=== January–April ===
- January 31 – Norm Zauchin, 69, first baseman for the Red Sox and Senators who had 93 RBI as a rookie in 1955
- February 12 – Jimmy Dudley, 89, broadcaster for the Indians from 1948 to 1967
- February 21 – Vinegar Bend Mizell, 68, All-Star pitcher who won 90 games for the Cardinals and Pirates; later a Congressman
- March 8 – Joe DiMaggio, 84, Hall of Fame center fielder for the New York Yankees who batted .325 lifetime, won three MVP awards (1939, 1941, 1947) and had record 56-game hitting streak in 1941; 13-time All-Star, on nine World Series champions, had seven years of 30 home runs and nine with 100 RBI, led AL in batting, slugging, home runs and RBI twice each, runs and triples once each; 361 HRs were 5th-most upon retirement, .579 slugging average ranked 6th all-time
- March 8 – William Wrigley III, 66, owner of the Cubs from 1977 to 1981 who sold the team to the Tribune Company, ending 60 years of family operation
- March 24 – Birdie Tebbetts, 86, All-Star catcher for the Tigers and Red Sox noted for his outspokenness; managed three teams and was AP Manager of the Year with 1956 Reds; scout for 28 years
- March 25 – Cal Ripken, Sr., 63, longtime coach and manager in the Orioles' system, and father of star shortstop/third baseman Cal Jr.
- April 4 – Early Wynn, 79, Hall of Fame pitcher for Senators, Indians and White Sox who won 300 games, top mark for AL in his generation; 1959 Cy Young season was among five 20-win campaigns; led AL in innings three times, strikeouts twice and ERA once
- April 26 – Faye Throneberry, 67, outfielder for the Red Sox and Senators who was 5th in the AL in steals as a rookie

=== May–August ===
- May 3 – Joe Adcock, 71, All-Star first baseman, mainly for the Milwaukee Braves, who twice hit 35 home runs; had four home runs and a double in a 1954 game, and ruined Harvey Haddix' epic 1959 no-hit bid with a 13th-inning homer
- June 6 – Eddie Stanky, 82, All-Star second baseman for five NL teams who led league in walks three times and runs once; managed Cardinals and White Sox
- June 26 – Tim Layana, 35, former Cincinnati Reds and San Francisco Giants pitcher and member of 1990 World Series Champion Reds team
- August 8 – Harry Walker, 80, "Harry the Hat", All-Star center fielder for the Cardinals and Phillies who won the 1947 batting title; manager for 20 years, mostly in the minor leagues, also a coach and scout
- August 14 – Pee Wee Reese, 81, Hall of Fame shortstop, leadoff hitter and captain of the Dodgers who led NL in runs, walks and steals once each and in putouts four times; retired with career record for double plays (1246) and 5th-most games at shortstop (2014) despite missing three years in World War II; played on seven pennant winners, three times hitting over .300 in World Series
- August 28 – Dave Pope, 78, outfielder in the Negro leagues, later with the Indians and Orioles

=== September–December ===
- September 9 – Jim "Catfish" Hunter, 53, Hall of Fame pitcher who had five straight 20-win seasons for the A's and Yankees and won 1974 Cy Young; among the first free agents, he had over 200 wins at age 30; pitched perfect game in 1968, was 4–0 with 2.19 ERA in three World Series with Oakland
- October 20 – Calvin Griffith, 87, owner of the Twins franchise from 1955 to 1984 who moved the team from Washington, D.C. in 1961
- October 19 – Ray Katt, 72, catcher for the Giants and Cardinals, later a coach at Texas Lutheran for 22 years
- October 20 – Earl Turner, 76, catcher for the Pittsburgh Pirates between 1948 and 1950
- October 30 – Max Patkin, 79, "Clown Prince of Baseball" who entertained fans for over 50 years
- December 9 – Whitey Kurowski, 81, a five-time All-Star third baseman who played for the Cardinals from 1941 to 1949

== See also ==
- 1999 Nippon Professional Baseball season
