= 2000 Tampa Bay Devil Rays season =

2000 Tampa Bay Devil Rays
- League: American League
- Division: East
- Ballpark: Tropicana Field
- City: St. Petersburg, Florida
- Record: 69–92 (.429)
- Divisional place: 5th
- Owners: Vince Naimoli
- General managers: Chuck LaMar
- Managers: Larry Rothschild
- Television: FSN Florida; WMOR (Joe Magrane, Dewayne Staats)
- Radio: WFLA (Paul Olden, Charlie Slowes); WBDN (Ricardo Tavares, Enrique Oliu)

The 2000 Tampa Bay Devil Rays season was their third since the franchise was created. They finished last in the American League East with a record of 69–92. Their manager was Larry Rothschild, who entered his third year with the club. This season is sometimes referred to by rays' fans as the "Hit Show" because the club signed several big-name sluggers in hopes of the team putting up better offensive numbers.

== Offseason ==
- December 13, 1999: Scott McClain was released by the Tampa Bay Devil Rays.
- March 31, 2000: Billy Taylor was signed as a free agent with the Tampa Bay Devil Rays.

== Regular season ==
On September 28, 2000, the Yankees played the Devil Rays at Tampa Bay. In the top of the 2nd inning, Jose Canseco was walked. Tino Martinez then hit a double to center field. The ball was fielded by Gerald Williams and relayed to Mike DiFelice. He tagged Jose Canseco at the plate and proceeded to tag out Tino Martinez who was running right behind Canseco. Mike DiFelice tagged both runners out at the plate.

=== Opening Day starters ===
4	Gerald Williams	CF
14	Dave Martinez	RF
33	Jose Canseco	DH
29	Fred McGriff	1B
23	Greg Vaughn	LF
35	Herbert Perry	3B
6	John Flaherty	C
19	Kevin Stocker	SS
13	Miguel Cairo	2B
46	Steve Trachsel	P

=== Season standings ===
AL East
Team	W	L	Pct.	GB	Home	Road
New York Yankees	87	74	.540	—	44‍–‍36	43‍–‍38
Boston Red Sox	85	77	.525	2½	42‍–‍39	43‍–‍38
Toronto Blue Jays	83	79	.512	4½	45‍–‍36	38‍–‍43
Baltimore Orioles	74	88	.457	13½	44‍–‍37	30‍–‍51
Tampa Bay Devil Rays	69	92	.429	18	36‍–‍44	33‍–‍48

=== Record vs. opponents ===
2000 American League record Source: MLB Standings Grid – 2000
Team	ANA	BAL	BOS	CWS	CLE	DET	KC	MIN	NYY	OAK	SEA	TB	TEX	TOR	NL
Anaheim	—	7–5	5–4	4–6	3–6	5–5	6–6	7–3	5–5	5–8	5–8	6–6	7–5	5–7	12–6
Baltimore	5–7	—	5–7	4–6	5–4	6–4	3–7	6–3	5–7	4–8	3–7	8–5	6–6	7–6	7–11
Boston	4–5	7–5	—	7–5	6–6	7–5	4–6	8–2	6–7	5–5	5–5	6–6	7–3	4–8	9–9
Chicago	6–4	6–4	5–7	—	8–5	9–3	5–7	7–5	8–4	6–3	7–5	6–4	5–5	5–5	12–6
Cleveland	6–3	4–5	6–6	5–8	—	6–7	5–7	5–8	5–5	6–6	7–2	8–2	6–4	8–4	13–5
Detroit	5–5	4–6	5–7	3–9	7–6	—	5–7	7–6	8–4	6–4	7–2	4–5	5–5	3–9	10–8
Kansas City	6–6	7–3	6–4	7–5	7–5	7–5	—	7–5	2–8	4–8	4–8	5–5	3–7	4–6	8–10
Minnesota	3–7	3–6	2–8	5–7	8–5	6–7	5–7	—	5–5	5–7	3–9	4–6	8–4	5–4	7–11
New York	5–5	7–5	7–6	4–8	5–5	4–8	8–2	5–5	—	6–3	4–6	6–6	10–2	5–7	11–6
Oakland	8–5	8–4	5–5	3–6	6–6	4–6	8–4	7–5	3–6	—	9–4	7–2	5–7	7–3	11–7
Seattle	8–5	7–3	5–5	5–7	2–7	2–7	8–4	9–3	6–4	4–9	—	9–3	7–5	8–2	11–7
Tampa Bay	6–6	5–8	6–6	4–6	2–8	5–4	5–5	6–4	6–6	2–7	3–9	—	5–7	5–7	9–9
Texas	5–7	6–6	3–7	5–5	4–6	5–5	7–3	4–8	2–10	7–5	5–7	7–5	—	4–6	7–11
Toronto	7–5	6–7	8–4	5–5	4–8	9–3	6–4	4–5	7–5	3–7	2–8	7–5	6–4	—	9–9

=== Notable transactions ===
- April 13, 2000: Dwight Gooden was purchased by the Tampa Bay Devil Rays from the Houston Astros.
- May 25, 2000: Dwight Gooden was released by the Tampa Bay Devil Rays.
- June 5, 2000: Rocco Baldelli was drafted by the Tampa Bay Devil Rays in the 1st round (6th pick) of the 2000 amateur draft. Player signed June 19, 2000.

=== Citrus Series ===
The 2000 Citrus Series between the Devil Rays and the Florida Marlins ended in a 3–3 tie. Florida had won the series during the prior two seasons.

- June 9 - Devil Rays vs Marlins: 6 – 4
- June 10 - Devil Rays vs Marlins: 1 – 5
- June 11 - Devil Rays vs Marlins: 7 – 6
- July 7 - Devil Rays @ Marlins: 8 – 3
- July 8 - Devil Rays @ Marlins: 5 – 6
- July 9 - Devil Rays @ Marlins: 9 – 10

=== Roster ===
2000 Tampa Bay Devil Rays
Roster
Pitchers: 38 Doug Creek; 47 Mike Duvall; 48 Dave Eiland; 45 Trevor Enders; 36 Tony Fiore; 16 Dwight Gooden; 36 Mark Guthrie; 57 Juan Guzmán; 58 Travis Harper; 39 Roberto Hernández; 27 Cory Lidle; 32 Albie Lopez; 45 Jim Mecir; 63 Jim Morris; 56 Bryan Rekar; 24 Ryan Rupe; 62 Jeff Sparks; 49 Tanyon Sturtze; 37 Billy Taylor; 46 Steve Trachsel; 34 Dan Wheeler; 51 Rick White; 41 Paul Wilson; 43 Esteban Yan	Catchers: 8 Mike DiFelice; 6 John Flaherty; 55 Toby Hall; Infielders: 13 Miguel Cairo; 9,20 Vinny Castilla; 26 Tony Graffanino; 13 Ozzie Guillén; 19 Aubrey Huff; 10 Russ Johnson; 16 Félix Martínez; 29 Fred McGriff; 34 Herbert Perry; 71 Damian Rolls; 9 Bob Smith; 19 Kevin Stocker	Outfielders: 28 Steve Cox; 30 José Guillén; 14 Dave Martinez; 3 Quinton McCracken; 44 Ozzie Timmons; 21 Bubba Trammell; 14 Jason Tyner; 23 Greg Vaughn; 4 Gerald Williams; 2 Randy Winn; Other batters: 33 Jose Canseco; 15 Kenny Kelly	Manager: 11 Larry Rothschild; Coaches: 7 José Cardenal (First Base); 54 Bill Fischer (Pitching); 25 Orlando Gómez (Bullpen); 22 Billy Hatcher (Third Base); 5 Leon Roberts (Hitting); 18 Bill Russell (Bench); 38 Rick Williams (Pitching)

== Player stats ==
= Indicates team leader

=== Batting ===
==== Starters by position ====
Note: Pos = Position; G = Games played; AB = At bats; H = Hits; HR = Home runs; RBI = Runs batted in; Avg. = Batting average; SB = Stolen bases

Pos	Player	G	AB	H	HR	RBI	Avg.	SB
C	John Flaherty	109	394	103	10	39	.261	0
1B	Fred McGriff	158	566	157	27	106	.277	2
2B	Miguel Cairo	119	375	98	1	34	.261	28
3B	Vinny Castilla	85	331	73	6	42	.221	1
SS	Felix Martinez	106	299	64	2	17	.214	9
LF	Greg Vaughn	127	461	117	28	74	.254	8
CF	Gerald Williams	146	632	173	21	89	.274	12
RF	José Guillén	105	316	80	10	41	.253	3
DH	Bubba Trammell	66	189	52	7	33	.275	3

==== Other batters ====
Note: G = Games played; AB = At bats; H = Hits; HR = Home runs; RBI = Runs batted in; Avg. = Batting average; SB = Stolen bases

Player	G	AB	H	HR	RBI	Avg.	SB
Steve Cox	116	318	90	11	35	.283	1
Jose Canseco	61	218	56	9	30	.257	2
Mike DiFelice	60	204	49	6	19	.240	0
Russ Johnson	74	185	47	2	17	.254	4
Bob Smith	49	175	41	6	26	.234	2
Randy Winn	51	159	40	1	16	.252	6
Aubrey Huff	39	122	35	4	14	.287	0
Kevin Stocker	40	114	30	2	8	.263	1
Ozzie Guillén	63	107	26	2	12	.243	1
Dave Martinez	29	104	27	1	12	.260	1
Jason Tyner	37	83	20	0	8	.241	6
Ozzie Timmons	12	41	14	4	13	.341	0
Quinton McCracken	15	31	4	0	2	.129	0
Herbert Perry	7	28	6	0	1	.214	0
Tony Graffanino	13	20	6	0	1	.300	0
Toby Hall	4	12	2	1	1	.167	0
Damian Rolls	4	3	1	0	0	.333	0
Kenny Kelly	2	1	0	0	0	.000	0

=== Pitching ===
==== Starting pitchers ====
Note: G = Games pitched; IP = Innings pitched; W = Wins; L = Losses; ERA = Earned run average; SO = Strikeouts

Player	G	IP	W	L	ERA	SO
Albie Lopez	45	185.1	11	13	4.13	96
Bryan Rekar	30	173.1	7	10	4.41	95
Steve Trachsel	23	137.2	6	10	4.58	78
Ryan Rupe	18	91.0	5	6	6.92	61

==== Other pitchers ====
Note: G = Games pitched; IP = Innings pitched; W = Wins; L = Losses; ERA = Earned run average; SO = Strikeouts; SV = Saves

Player	G	IP	W	L	ERA	SO	SV
Dave Eiland	17	54.2	2	3	7.24	17	0
Dwight Gooden	8	36.2	2	3	6.63	23	0
Juan Guzman	1	1.2	0	1	43.20	3	0
Travis Harper	6	32.0	1	2	4.78	14	0
Cory Lidle	31	96.2	4	6	5.03	62	0
Paul Wilson	11	51.0	1	4	3.35	40	0
Esteban Yan	43	137.2	7	8	6.21	111	0

==== Relief pitchers ====
Note: G = Games pitched; IP = Innings pitched; W = Wins; L = Losses; ERA = Earned run average; SO = Strikeouts; SV = Saves

Player	G	IP	W	L	ERA	SO	SV
Doug Creek	45	60.2	1	3	4.60	73	1
Mike Duvall	2	2.1	0	0	7.71	0	0
Trevor Enders	9	9.1	0	1	10.61	5	0
Tony Fiore	11	15.0	1	1	8.40	8	0
Mark Guthrie	34	32.0	1	1	4.50	26	0
Roberto Hernández	68	73.1	4	7	3.19	61	32
Jim Mecir	38	49.2	7	2	3.08	33	1
Jim Morris	16	10.1	0	0	4.35	10	0
Jeff Sparks	15	20.1	0	1	3.54	24	0
Tanyon Sturtze	19	52.2	4	0	2.56	38	0
Billy Taylor	17	13.2	1	3	8.56	13	0
Dan Wheeler	11	23.0	1	1	5.48	17	0
Rick White	44	71.1	3	6	3.41	47	2

== Game log ==
Game Log
April (9-15)

#	Date	Opponent	Score	Win	Loss	Save	Attendance	Record
1	April 3	@ Twins	7 – 0	Trachsel (1–0)	Radke (0–1)		43,830	1-0
2	April 4	@ Twins	6 – 5	Carrasco (1–0)	Hernandez (0–1)		7,020	1-1
3	April 5	@ Twins	10 –7	Guardado (1–0)	White (0–1)		7,089	1-2
4	April 6	@ Twins	7 – 6	Mecir (1–0)	Carrasco (1–1)	Hernandez (1)	8,763	2-2
5	April 7	Indians	14 – 5	Wright (1–0)	Guzmán (0–1)		40,329	2-3
6	April 8	Indians	6 – 4	Burba (1–0)	Trachsel (1–1)	Karsay (2)	30,177	2-4
7	April 9	Indians	17 – 4	Colón (2–0)	Rupe (0–1)		21,357	2-5
8	April 11	White Sox	13 – 6	Parque (1–0)	Yan (0–1)		13,639	2-6
9	April 12	White Sox	7 – 1	Baldwin (2–0)	Wheeler (0–1)		14,034	2-7
10	April 13	White Sox	6 – 5 (12)	Mecir (2–0)	Sturtze (0–1)		15,464	3-7
11	April 14	@ Tigers	10 – 5	Nitkowski (1–2)	Rupe (0–2)		25,043	3-8
12	April 15	@ Tigers	7 – 0	Gooden (1–0)	Weaver (0–1)		25,969	4-8
13	April 16	@ Tigers	7 – 6	Hernandez (1–1)	Jones (0–1)		24,686	5-8
	April 17	@ Orioles	Postponed (rain) Rescheduled for April 20					
14	April 19	@ Orioles	3 – 2	Trombley (1–1)	Mecir (2–1)		40,077	5-9
15	April 20	@ Orioles	8 – 4	Rapp (2–0)	Rupe (0–3)		34,536	5-10
16	April 21	Angels	9 – 6	Petkovsek (1–2)	Hernandez (1–2)	Percival (5)	22,221	5-11
17	April 22	Angels	11 – 9 (10)	Lopez (1–0)	Mercker (0–1)		22,042	6-11
18	April 23	Angels	1 – 0	Eiland (1–0)	Dickson (2–1)	Hernandez (2)	15,601	7-11
19	April 25	@ Royals	7 – 6	Reichert (1–0)	Lopez (1–1)		14,677	7-12
20	April 26	@ Royals	7 – 6	Bottalico (3–1)	Lopez (1–2)		14,209	7-13
21	April 27	@ Angels	7 – 3	Gooden (2–0)	Ortiz (1–2)		16,144	8-13
22	April 28	@ Angels	11 – 2	Yan (1–1)	Dickson (2–2)		31,888	9-13
23	April 29	@ Angels	7 – 6 (13)	Levine (1–0)	Sparks (0–1)		26,827	9-14
24	April 30	@ Angels	5 – 2	Bottenfield (2–3)	Trachsel (1–2)	Percival (6)	25,613	9-15

May (8-19)

#	Date	Opponent	Score	Win	Loss	Save	Attendance	Record
25	May 2	Rangers	8 – 1	Helling (3–1)	Rupe (0–4)		15,067	9-16
26	May 3	Rangers	5 – 1	Clark (3–2)	Gooden (2–1)	Wetteland (3)	14,064	9-17
27	May 4	Rangers	8 –7 (11)	Lopez (2–2)	Zimmerman (0–4)		14,107	10-17
28	May 5	@ Red Sox	5 – 3	Martínez (2–2)	Eiland (1–1)	Lowe (6)	32,479	10-18
29	May 6	@ Red Sox	1 – 0	Trachsel (2–2)	Martínez (5–1)		32,497	11-18
30	May 7	@ Red Sox	9 – 7	Fassero (4–1)	Rekar (0–1)	Lowe (7)	32,336	11-19
31	May 8	@ Yankees	6 – 3	Pettitte (2–1)	Gooden (2–2)	Rivera (12)	25,361	11-20
32	May 9	@ Yankees	4 – 3 (10)	Nelson (6–0)	White (0–2)		23,097	11-21
33	May 11	@ Yankees	1 – 0	Trachsel (3–2)	Hernández (4–2)	Lopez (1)	14,292	12-21
34	May 12	Blue Jays	4 – 3	White (1–2)	Carpenter (3–4)	Lopez (2)	17,532	13-21
35	May 13	Blue Jays	8 – 4	Escobar (4–4)	Lidle (0–1)		20,054	13-22
36	May 14	Blue Jays	3 – 2	Wells (7–1)	Lopez (2–3)		15,788	13-23
37	May 15	@ Rangers	6 – 5	Oliver (1–2)	White (1–3)	Wetteland (6)	26,683	13-24
38	May 16	@ Rangers	9 – 7	Zimmerman (1–4)	Lopez (2–4)	Wetteland (7)	31,033	13-25
39	May 17	@ Rangers	11 – 6	Crabtree (1–1)	Rekar (0–2)		27,342	13-26
40	May 19	@ Mariners	7 – 6	Mesa (2–2)	Taylor (0–1)	Sasaki (5)	34,067	13-27
41	May 20	@ Mariners	4 – 3	Yan (2–1)	Ramsay (0–1)	Hernandez (3)	40,665	14-27
42	May 21	@ Mariners	8 – 4	Sele (4–2)	Trachsel (3–3)		45,264	14-28
43	May 23	Athletics	6 – 4	Rekar (1–2)	Olivares (3–5)	Hernandez (4)	13,555	15-28
44	May 24	Athletics	9 – 2	Appier (4–3)	Gooden (2–3)	Tam (1)	13,039	15-29
45	May 25	Athletics	6 – 3	Heredia (6–3)	Yan (2–2)	Isringhausen (9)	13,251	15-30
46	May 26	Mariners	11 – 4	Sele (5–2)	Trachsel (3–4)		14,627	15-31
47	May 27	Mariners	6 – 3	Tomko (3–2)	Rekar (1–3)	Sasaki (6)	24,373	15-32
48	May 28	Mariners	14 – 4	Mecir (3–1)	Mesa (2–4)		16,194	16-32
49	May 29	Orioles	5 – 1	Rapp (4–2)	Trachsel (3–5)		24,209	16-33
50	May 30	Orioles	8 – 7	Ponson (3–2)	Yan (2–3)	Timlin (4)	13,113	16-34
51	May 31	Orioles	4 – 3	Mecir (4–1)	Groom (3–3	Hernandez (5)	13,870	17-34

June (15-11)

#	Date	Opponent	Score	Win	Loss	Save	Attendance	Record
52	June 1	Orioles	2 – 1	Rekar (2–3)	Erickson (2–2)	Hernandez (6)	14,108	18-34
53	June 2	@ Mets	5 – 3	Rusch (3–4)	White (1–4)	Benítez (14)	24,123	18-35
54	June 3	@ Mets	1 – 0	Leiter (6–1)	Trachsel (3–6)	Benítez (15)	33,694	18-36
55	June 4	@ Mets	15 – 5	Yan (3–3)	Jones (1–2)		43,610	19-36
56	June 5	@ Phillies	5 – 3 (12)	Guthrie (3–3)	Boyd (0–1)	White (1)	13,237	20-36
57	June 6	@ Phillies	5 – 3 (10)	Hernandez (2–2)	Brantley (1–1)	White (2)	13,415	21-36
58	June 7	@ Phillies	5 – 4	Brock (1–4)	Guthrie (3–4)	Brantley (5)	20,514	21-37
59	June 9	Marlins	6 – 4	Trachsel (4–6)	Dempster (6–4)	Hernandez (7)	16,035	22-37
60	June 10	Marlins	5 – 1	Cornelius (1–1)	Yan (3–4)	Alfonseca (18)	42,823	22-38
61	June 11	Marlins	7 – 6	Mecir (5–1)	Bones (1–2)	Hernandez (8)	20,647	23-38
62	June 13	Angels	5 – 3	Etherton (1–1)	Rekar (2–4)	Percival (16)	13,483	23-39
63	June 14	Angels	3 – 2	Lopez (3–4)	Percival (4–3)		13,362	24-39
64	June 15	Angels	2 – 1	Trachsel (5–6)	Hasegawa (5–2)		13,210	25-39
65	June 16	Rangers	9 – 2	Yan (4–4)	Oliver (2–4)		16,834	26-39
66	June 17	Rangers	5 – 0	Perisho (2–0)	Lidle (0–2)		22,813	26-40
67	June 18	Rangers	6 – 1	White (2–4)	Helling (7–6)		20,197	27-40
68	June 19	Mariners	10 – 3	Lopez (4–4)	Halama (6–3)		38,331	28-40
69	June 20	Mariners	4 – 3	Abbott (4–2)	Trachsel (5–7)		29,349	28-41
70	June 21	Mariners	8 – 5	Sele (8–3)	Yan (4–5)	Sasaki (12)	27,555	28-42
71	June 23	@ Rangers	7 – 4	Lidle (1–2)	Helling (7–7)	Hernandez (9)	42,336	29-42
72	June 24	@ Rangers	9 – 7	White (3–4)	Crabtree (1–5)	Hernandez (10)	48,256	30-42
73	June 25	@ Rangers	9 – 5	Rogers (7–5)	Lopez (4–5)	Loaiza (1)	37,107	30-43
74	June 27	Blue Jays	11 – 1	Trachsel (6–7)	Escobar (6–9)		14,657	31-43
75	June 28	Blue Jays	5 – 2	Wells (13–2)	Yan (4–6)		15,308	31-44
76	June 29	Blue Jays	12 – 3	Castillo (5–5)	Lidle (1–3)		21,666	31-45
77	June 30	Yankees	6 – 4	Mecir (6–1)	Nelson (6–2)	Hernandez (11)	30,323	32-45

July (12-14)

#	Date	Opponent	Score	Win	Loss	Save	Attendance	Record
78	July 1	Yankees	6 – 1	Hernández (7–6)	Lopez (4–6)		37,990	32-46
79	July 2	Yankees	5 – 2	Clemens (5–6)	Trachsel (6–8)	Rivera (18)	31,118	32-47
80	July 3	Tigers	5 – 4 (10)	Patterson (3–1)	Hernandez (2–3)	Jones (24)	15,709	32-48
81	July 4	Tigers	11 – 0	Mlicki (3–9)	Lidle (1–4)		18,011	32-49
82	July 5	Tigers	4 – 1	Rekar (3–4)	Weaver (5–7)	Hernandez (12)	14,934	33-49
83	July 7	@ Marlins	8 – 3	Lopez (5–6)	Dempster (9–5)	Mecir (1)	13,067	34-49
84	July 8	@ Marlins	6 – 5	Looper (3–1)	White (3–5)	Alfonseca (27)	21,157	34-50
85	July 9	@ Marlins	10 – 9	Sanchez (5–7)	Creek (0–1)	Alfonseca (28)	11,907	34-51
86	July 13	Expos	6 – 4	Mecir (7–1)	Lira (2–1)	Hernandez (13)	14,924	35-51
87	July 14	Expos	8 – 5	Lopez (6–6)	Armas (6–6)	Hernandez (14)	15,870	36-51
88	July 15	Expos	4 – 1	Hermanson (7–7)	Trachsel (6–9)	Kline (12)	19,366	36-52
89	July 16	Braves	6 – 4	Kamieniecki (2–3)	Mecir (7–2)		41,066	36-53
90	July 17	Braves	8 – 6	Rupe (1–4)	Mulholland (9–9)	Hernandez (15)	28,538	37-53
91	July 18	Braves	8 – 2	Maddux (12–3)	Rekar (3–5)		31,354	37-54
92	July 19	@ Blue Jays	5 – 2	Escobar (7–9)	Lopez (6–7)	Koch (22)	18,751	37-55
93	July 20	@ Blue Jays	6 – 5	Quantrill (1–5)	White (3–6)	Koch (23)	18,951	37-56
94	July 21	@ Yankees	11 – 1	Gooden (4–3)	Yan (4–7)		39,518	37-57
95	July 22	@ Yankees	12 – 4	Rupe (2–4)	Cone (1–9)		47,375	38-57
96	July 23	@ Yankees	5 – 1	Neagle (10–2)	Rekar (3–6)		45,528	38-58
97	July 24	@ Tigers	4 – 2	Lopez (7–7)	Nomo (3–10)	Hernandez (16)	28,102	39-58
98	July 25	@ Tigers	6 – 4	Blair (7–2)	Trachsel (6–10)	Jones (28)	26,271	39-59
99	July 26	@ Tigers	6 – 2	Yan (5–7)	Weaver (5–7)	Hernandez (17)	32,884	40-59
100	July 27	@ Royals	8 – 5	Rupe (3–4)	Durbin (2–5)	Hernandez (18)	20,898	41-59
101	July 28	@ Royals	10 – 3	Rekar (4–6)	Stein (1–3)		17,511	42-59
102	July 29	@ Royals	2 – 1	Lopez (8–7)	Suzuki (5–6)	Hernandez (19)	29,162	43-59
103	July 30	@ Royals	7 – 6 (10)	Sturtze (2–2)	Spradlin (4–3)	Hernandez (20)	16,612	44-59

August (15-15)

#	Date	Opponent	Score	Win	Loss	Save	Attendance	Record
104	August 1	Indians	6 – 5	Creek (1–1)	Wickman (2–3)		24,481	45-59
105	August 2	Indians	5 – 3	Karsay (3–5)	Creek (1–2)	Wickman (17)	16,909	45-60
106	August 3	Indians	5 – 1	Bere (8–7)	Lopez (8–8)		21,703	45-61
107	August 4	Orioles	10 – 9 (15)	Johnson (1–8)	Yan (5–8)		15,590	45-62
108	August 5	Orioles	5 – 4 (10)	Hernandez (3–3)	Trombley (4–3)		18,471	46-62
109	August 6	Orioles	7 – 4	Rupe (4–4)	Mussina (7–11)	Hernandez (21)	18,864	47-62
110	August 7	Twins	4 – 2	Redman (10–5)	Rekar (4–7)	Eddie Guardado		47-63
111	August 8	Twins	5 – 0	Lopez (9–8)	Radke (8–12)		13,155	48-63
112	August 9	Twins	5 – 4 (10)	Taylor (1–1)	Hawkins (2–3)		13,916	49-63
113	August 10	Twins	10 – 4	Sturtze (3–2)	Mays (6–14)		14,935	50-63
114	August 11	White Sox	6 – 5	Buehrle (2–1)	Wilson (0–1)	Foulke (20)	18,370	50-64
115	August 12	White Sox	5 – 4 (10)	Buehrle (3–1)	Hernandez (3–4)	Foulke (21)	27,538	50-65
116	August 13	White Sox	5 – 3	Lopez (10–8)	Howry (2–3)		19,685	51-65
117	August 14	@ Red Sox	7 – 3	Lowe (3–4)	Taylor (1–2)		32,174	51-66
118	August 15	@ Red Sox	3 – 1	Sturtze (4–2)	Fassero (8–6)	Hernandez (22)	33,015	52-66
119	August 16	@ Red Sox	4 – 3	Wilson (0–2)	Wilson (0–2)	Lowe (27)	31,467	52-67
120	August 18	@ White Sox	5 – 2	Garland (3–4)	Rekar (4–8)	Foulke (22)	25,160	52-68
121	August 19	@ White Sox	7 – 0	Sirotka (11–10)	Lopez (10–9)		38,926	52-69
122	August 20	@ White Sox	12 – 11	Yan (6–8)	Foulke (3–1)	Hernandez (23)	27,744	53-69
123	August 21	@ White Sox	11 – 4	Sturtze (5–2)	Parque (10–5)		31,744	54-69
124	August 22	@ Twins	3 – 2	Rupe (5–4)	Romero (2–3)	Hernandez (24)	7,793	55-69
125	August 23	@ Twins	8 – 2	Redman (12–6)	Rekar (4–9)	Hawkins (9)	7,278	55-70
126	August 25	@ Orioles	4 – 3	Ryan (2–3)	Taylor (1–3)	Kohlmeier (6)	24,503	55-71
127	August 26	@ Orioles	4 – 1	Eiland (2–1)	Ponson (7–9)	Hernandez (25)	40,441	56-71
128	August 26	@ Orioles	2 – 0	Groom (6–3)	Lidle (1–5)	Trombley (4)	38,783	56-72
129	August 27	@ Orioles	3 – 2	Spurgeon (1–0)	Rupe (5–5)	Kohlmeier (7)	36,078	56-73
130	August 28	Red Sox	5 – 2	Rekar (5–9)	Pichardo (5–3)	Hernandez (26)	17,721	57-73
131	August 29	Red Sox	8 – 0	Martínez (15–4)	Eiland (2–2)		17,450	57-74
132	August 30	Red Sox	3 – 1	Lopez (11–9)	Fassero (8–8)	Hernandez (27)	15,043	58-74
133	August 31	Royals	2 – 1	Fiore (1–0)	Suppan (7–8)	Hernandez (28)	13,608	59-74

September (9-18)

#	Date	Opponent	Score	Win	Loss	Save	Attendance	Record
134	September 1	Royals	9 – 5	Meadows (10–10)	Rupe (5–6)		18,460	59-75
135	September 2	Royals	7 – 5	Santiago (7–4)	Hernandez (3–5)	Bottalico (15)	23,129	59-76
136	September 3	Royals	8 – 2	Stein (6–3)	Eiland (2–3)		16,998	59-77
137	September 4	@ Indians	5 – 1	Burba (13–6)	Lopez (11–10)		42,628	59-78
138	September 5	@ Indians	7 – 4	Bere (11–9)	Fiore (1–1)	Wickman (26)	42,660	59-79
139	September 6	@ Indians	6 – 2	Finley (12–10)	Harper (0–1)		42,742	59-80
140	September 7	@ Indians	4 – 3	Rekar (6–9)	Karsay (4–8)	Hernandez (29)	42,709	60-80
141	September 8	@ Athletics	4 – 0	Lidle (2–5)	Heredia (14–10)	Creek (1)	12,085	61-80
142	September 9	@ Athletics	10 – 0	Hudson (16–6)	Lopez (11–11)		30,841	61-81
143	September 10	@ Athletics	11 – 0	Zito (4–3)	Wilson (0–3)		20,957	61-82
144	September 11	@ Athletics	5 – 1	Appier (13–11)	Creek (1–3)		9,109	61-83
145	September 12	@ Angels	5 – 2	Belcher (4–2)	Rekar (6–10)	Percival (29)	15,689	61-84
146	September 13	@ Angels	8 – 4	Ortiz (6–5)	Lidle (2–6)		16,686	61-85
147	September 15	Athletics	17 – 3	Zito (5–3)	Lopez (11–12)		14,087	61-86
148	September 16	Athletics	5 – 2	Hudson (17–6)	Wilson (0–4)	Isringhausen (28)	17,154	61-87
—	September 17	Athletics	Cancelled (Hurricane Gordon) Not rescheduled					
149	September 18	Mariners	4 – 3	Paniagua (3–0)	Hernandez (3–6)		13,129	61-88
150	September 19	Mariners	5 – 2	Halama (12–9)	Harper (0–2)	Paniagua (5)	16,726	61-89
151	September 20	Mariners	5 – 4	Sele (16–10)	Lopez (11–13)	Sasaki (34)	17,192	61-90
152	September 22	@ Blue Jays	3 – 2	Lidle (3–6)	Frascatore (2–4)	Hernandez (30)	18,063	62-90
153	September 23	@ Blue Jays	7 – 6	Koch (9–3)	Enders (0–1)		24,473	62-91
154	September 24	@ Blue Jays	6 – 0	Harper (1–2)	Trachsel (8–14)		28,172	63-91
155	September 25	@ Blue Jays	5 – 1	Wilson (1–4)	Loaiza (10–12)	Hernandez (31)	20,715	64-91
156	September 26	Yankees	2 – 1	Hernandez (4–6)	Nelson (8–4)		19,469	65-91
157	September 27	Yankees	11 – 1	Lidle (4–6)	Neagle (15–9)		18,863	66-91
158	September 28	Yankees	11 – 3	Rekar (7–10)	Clemens (13–8)		20,961	67-91
159	September 29	Red Sox	8 – 6	Yan (7–8)	Carrasco (5–4)	Hernandez (32)	18,290	68-91
160	September 30	Red Sox	4 – 2	Cormier (3–3)	Hernandez (4–7)	Lowe (42)	23,477	68-92

October (1-0)

#	Date	Opponent	Score	Win	Loss	Save	Attendance	Record
161	October 1	Red Sox	3 – 2 (10)	Wheeler (1–1)	Croushore (2–1)		28,043	69-92

== Farm system ==
Level	Team	League	Manager
AAA	Durham Bulls	International League	Bill Evers
AA	Orlando Rays	Southern League	Mike Ramsey
A	St. Petersburg Devil Rays	Florida State League	Julio Garcia
A	Charleston RiverDogs	South Atlantic League	Charlie Montoyo
A-Short Season	Hudson Valley Renegades	New York–Penn League	Dave Silvestri
Rookie	Princeton Devil Rays	Appalachian League	Edwin Rodríguez
