= 1995 St. Louis Cardinals season =

114th season in franchise history, final under ownership of Anheuser-Busch

1995 St. Louis Cardinals
- League: National League
- Division: Central
- Ballpark: Busch Memorial Stadium
- City: St. Louis, Missouri
- Record: 62–81 (.434)
- Divisional place: 4th
- Owners: Anheuser-Busch
- General managers: Walt Jocketty
- Managers: Joe Torre and Mike Jorgensen
- Television: KPLR (Jack Buck, Mike Shannon, Joe Buck, Al Hrabosky, Bob Carpenter); Prime Sports Midwest (Al Hrabosky, Bob Carpenter, Joe Buck)
- Radio: KMOX (Jack Buck, Mike Shannon, Joe Buck, Al Hrabosky, Bob Carpenter)

The 1995 St. Louis Cardinals season was the team's 114th season in St. Louis, Missouri and the 104th season in the National League. The Cardinals went 62–81 during the season and finished fourth in the National League Central division, 22½ games behind the Cincinnati Reds. It was also the team's final season under the ownership of Anheuser-Busch, who would put the team up for sale on October 25, 1995, ending a 43-season ownership reign.

== Offseason ==
- November 7, 1994: Scott Coolbaugh was released by the St. Louis Cardinals.
- December 12, 1994: Tom Henke was signed as a free agent with the St. Louis Cardinals.
- March 9, 1995: Darnell Coles was signed as a free agent with the St. Louis Cardinals.

== Regular season ==
Rookie Mark Sweeney got a hit in seven straight pinch-hit at-bats, one short of the major league record. Tom Henke became the seventh pitcher to notch 300 career saves. Outfielders Bernard Gilkey (.298 batting average, 17 home runs), Ray Lankford (25 home runs, 24 stolen bases), and Brian Jordan (.296, 22 home runs) highlighted the Cardinals offense.

Manager Joe Torre was fired on June 16, and was replaced by Mike Jorgensen for the rest of the season.

The Cardinals struggled offensively in 1995, finishing 28th overall in runs scored (563), hits (1,182), runs batted in (533), batting average (.247), on-base percentage (.314) and slugging percentage (.374).

=== Season standings ===
NL Central
Team	W	L	Pct.	GB	Home	Road
Cincinnati Reds	85	59	.590	—	44‍–‍28	41‍–‍31
Houston Astros	76	68	.528	9	36‍–‍36	40‍–‍32
Chicago Cubs	73	71	.507	12	34‍–‍38	39‍–‍33
St. Louis Cardinals	62	81	.434	22½	39‍–‍33	23‍–‍48
Pittsburgh Pirates	58	86	.403	27	31‍–‍41	27‍–‍45

=== Record vs. opponents ===
1995 National League record Source: MLB Standings Grid – 1995
Team	ATL	CHC	CIN	COL	FLA	HOU	LAD	MON	NYM	PHI	PIT	SD	SF	STL
Atlanta	—	8–4	8–5	9–4	10–3	6–6	5–4	9–4	5–8	7–6	4–2	5–2	7–1	7–5
Chicago	4–8	—	3–7	6–7	8–4	5–8	7–5	3–5	4–3	6–1	8–5	5–7	5–7	9–4
Cincinnati	5–8	7–3	—	5–7	6–6	12–1	4–3	8–4	7–5	9–3	8–5	3–6	3–3	8–5
Colorado	4–9	7–6	7–5	—	5–7	4–4	4–9	7–1	5–4	4–2	8–4	9–4	8–5	5–7
Florida	3–10	4–8	6–6	7–5	—	8–4	3–7	6–7	7–6	6–7	5–8	3–2	5–3	4–3
Houston	6–6	8–5	1–12	4–4	4–8	—	3–2	9–3	6–6	5–7	9–4	7–4	5–3	9–4
Los Angeles	4–5	5–7	3–4	9–4	7–3	2–3	—	7–5	6–6	4–9	9–4	7–6	8–5	7–5
Montreal	4–9	5–3	4–8	1–7	7–6	3–9	5–7	—	7–6	8–5	4–4	7–5	7–6	4–3
New York	8–5	3–4	5–7	4–5	6–7	6–6	6–6	6–7	—	7–6	4–3	6–7	5–8	3–4
Philadelphia	6-7	1–6	3–9	2–4	7–6	7–5	9–4	5–8	6–7	—	6–3	6–6	6–6	5–4
Pittsburgh	2–4	5–8	5–8	4–8	8–5	4–9	4–9	4–4	3–4	3–6	—	4–8	6–6	6–7
San Diego	2–5	7–5	6–3	4–9	2–3	4–7	6–7	5–7	7–6	6–6	8–4	—	6–7	7–5
San Francisco	1–7	7–5	3–3	5–8	3–5	3–5	5–8	6–7	8–5	6–6	6–6	7–6	—	7–6
St. Louis	5–7	4–9	5–8	7–5	3–4	4-9	5–7	3–4	4–3	4–5	7–6	5–7	6–7	—

=== Opening Day starters ===
- Scott Cooper
- Bernard Gilkey
- Ken Hill
- Brian Jordan
- Ray Lankford
- Manuel Lee
- John Mabry
- Tom Pagnozzi
- Ozzie Smith

=== Transactions ===
- April 5, 1995: Ken Hill was traded by the Montreal Expos to the St. Louis Cardinals for Kirk Bullinger, Bryan Eversgerd, and Da Rond Stovall.
- April 9, 1995: Mark Whiten was traded by the St. Louis Cardinals with Rheal Cormier to the Boston Red Sox for Cory Bailey and Scott Cooper.
- April 18, 1995: Manuel Lee was signed as a free agent with the St. Louis Cardinals.
- May 2, 1995: Greg Cadaret was signed as a free agent with the St. Louis Cardinals.
- June 6, 1995: Greg Cadaret was released by the St. Louis Cardinals.
- June 8, 1995: Chris Sabo was signed as a free agent with the St. Louis Cardinals.
- June 22, 1995: Manuel Lee was released by the St. Louis Cardinals.
- July 9, 1995: Mark Sweeney was traded by the California Angels to the St. Louis Cardinals for John Habyan.
- July 27, 1995: Ken Hill was traded by the St. Louis Cardinals to the Cleveland Indians for David Bell, Rick Heiserman, and Pepe McNeal (minors).
- August 25, 1995: Darnell Coles was released by the St. Louis Cardinals.
- September 11, 1995: Chris Sabo was released by the St. Louis Cardinals.

=== Roster ===
1995 St. Louis Cardinals
Roster
Pitchers: 43 René Arocha; 39 Cory Bailey; 52 Brian Barber; 41 Alan Benes; 37 Doug Creek; 41 Rich DeLucia; 48 Tony Fossas; 60 John Frascatore; 32 John Habyan; 50 Tom Henke; 44 Ken Hill; 29 Danny Jackson; 51 T. J. Mathews; 36 Mike Morgan; 31 Donovan Osborne; 58 Vicente Palacios; 49 Jeff Parrett; 46 Mark Petkovsek; 33 Rich Rodriguez; 34 Tom Urbani; 38 Allen Watson	Catchers: 26 Scott Hemond; 19 Tom Pagnozzi; 12 Danny Sheaffer; Infielders: 27 David Bell; 10 Ramon Caraballo; 7 Darnell Coles; 34 Scott Cooper; 7 Tripp Cromer; 25 Tim Hulett; 18 Manuel Lee; 47 John Mabry; 42 José Oliva; 11 Jose Oquendo; 21 Gerónimo Peña; 28 Gerald Perry; 18 Chris Sabo; 1 Ozzie Smith; 23 Mark Sweeney; 27 Todd Zeile	Outfielders: 35 Allen Battle; 55 Terry Bradshaw; 54 Ray Giannelli; 23 Bernard Gilkey; 3 Brian Jordan; 16 Ray Lankford	Manager: 22 Mike Jorgensen; 9 Joe Torre; Coaches: 8 José Cardenal (First Base); 10 Chris Chambliss (Hitting); 45 Bob Gibson (Bullpen); 4 Gaylen Pitts (Third Base); 12 Mark Riggins (Pitching); 2 Red Schoendienst (Bench)

== Player stats ==
=== Batting ===
==== Starters by position ====
Note: Pos = Position; G = Games played; AB = At bats; H = Hits; Avg. = Batting average; HR = Home runs; RBI = Runs batted in

Pos	Player	G	AB	H	Avg.	HR	RBI
C	Tom Pagnozzi	62	219	47	.215	2	15
1B	John Mabry	129	388	119	.307	5	41
2B	José Oquendo	88	220	46	.209	2	17
SS	Tripp Cromer	105	345	78	.226	5	18
3B	Scott Cooper	118	374	86	.230	3	40
LF	Bernard Gilkey	121	480	143	.298	17	69
CF	Ray Lankford	132	483	134	.277	25	82
RF	Brian Jordan	131	490	145	.296	22	81

==== Other batters ====
Note: G = Games played; AB = At bats; H = Hits; Avg. = Batting average; HR = Home runs; RBI = Runs batted in

Player	G	AB	H	Avg.	HR	RBI
Danny Sheaffer	76	208	48	.231	5	30
Ozzie Smith	44	156	31	.199	0	11
David Bell	39	144	36	.250	2	19
Darnell Coles	63	138	31	.225	3	16
Todd Zeile	34	127	37	.291	5	22
Allen Battle	61	118	32	.271	0	2
Scott Hemond	57	118	17	.144	3	9
Gerónimo Peña	32	101	27	.267	1	8
Ramón Caraballo	34	99	20	.202	2	3
Gerald Perry	65	79	13	.165	0	5
Mark Sweeney	37	77	21	.273	2	13
José Oliva	22	74	9	.122	2	8
Terry Bradshaw	19	44	10	.227	0	2
Chris Sabo	5	13	2	.154	0	3
Ray Giannelli	9	11	1	.091	0	0
Tim Hulett	4	11	2	.182	0	0
Manuel Lee	1	1	1	1.000	0	0

=== Pitching ===
==== Starting pitchers ====
Note: G = Games pitched; IP = Innings pitched; W = Wins; L = Losses; ERA = Earned run average; SO = Strikeouts

Player	G	IP	W	L	ERA	SO
Mark Petkovsek	26	137.1	6	6	4.00	71
Allen Watson	21	114.1	7	9	4.96	49
Donovan Osborne	19	113.1	4	6	3.81	82
Ken Hill	18	110.1	6	7	5.06	50
Mike Morgan	17	106.2	5	6	3.88	46
Danny Jackson	19	100.2	2	12	5.90	52
Alan Benes	3	16.0	1	2	8.44	20

==== Other pitchers ====
Note: G = Games pitched; IP = Innings pitched; W = Wins; L = Losses; ERA = Earned run average; SO = Strikeouts

Player	G	IP	W	L	ERA	SO
Tom Urbani	24	82.2	3	5	3.70	52
Vicente Palacios	20	40.1	2	3	5.80	34
John Frascatore	14	32.2	1	1	4.41	21
Brian Barber	9	29.1	2	1	5.22	27

==== Relief pitchers ====
Note: G = Games pitched; W = Wins; L = Losses; SV = Saves; ERA = Earned run average; SO = Strikeouts

Player	G	W	L	SV	ERA	SO
Tom Henke	52	1	1	36	1.82	48
Jeff Parrett	59	4	7	0	3.64	71
Tony Fossas	58	3	0	0	1.47	40
Rich DeLucia	56	8	7	0	3.39	76
René Arocha	41	3	5	0	3.99	25
John Habyan	31	3	2	0	2.88	35
T.J. Mathews	23	1	1	2	1.52	28
Doug Creek	6	0	0	0	0.00	10
Cory Bailey	3	0	0	0	7.36	5
Rick Rodriguez	1	0	0	0	0.00	0

== Awards and honors ==
- Ozzie Smith, Shortstop, Roberto Clemente Award

== Farm system ==
Level	Team	League	Manager
AAA	Louisville Redbirds	American Association	Joe Pettini
AA	Arkansas Travelers	Texas League	Mike Ramsey
A	St. Petersburg Cardinals	Florida State League	Chris Maloney
A	Peoria Chiefs	Midwest League	Roy Silver
A	Savannah Cardinals	South Atlantic League	Scott Melvin
A-Short Season	New Jersey Cardinals	New York–Penn League	Luis Meléndez
Rookie	Johnson City Cardinals	Appalachian League	Steve Turco

LEAGUE CHAMPIONS: Louisville
