= New York Tech Bears =

- University: New York Institute of Technology
- Nickname: Bears
- NCAA: Division II
- Conference: East Coast Conference
- Athletic director: Dan Vélez
- Location: Old Westbury, New York
- Varsity teams: 13
- Basketball arena: Recreation Hall
- Baseball stadium: Angelo Lorenzo Field
- Soccer stadium: President's Stadium
- Lacrosse stadium: President's Stadium
- Website: site.nyit.edu/athletics
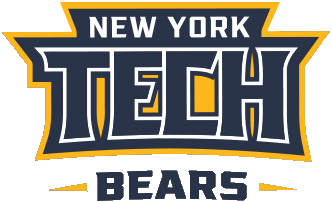

The New York Tech Bears were the athletic teams that represented the New York Institute of Technology (NYIT) located in Old Westbury, New York, United States in intercollegiate sports as a member of the NCAA Division II ranks, primarily competing in the East Coast Conference (ECC; originally called as the New York Collegiate Athletic Conference (NYCAC) until after the 2005–06 academic year) from 1989–90 until their last season of competition in the 2019–20 school year before the university announced its suspension until further notice due to the COVID-19 pandemic.

Tech is best known for its men's lacrosse team, which has won four NCAA Division II national championships. Tech also sent several runners to the Olympic Games, in 1980, 1988, 1992, and in 2000. In 2019, NYIT became a College World Series team.

In August 2020, the NYIT announced it would suspend its NCAA Division II intercollegiate athletics for at least two years. However, it didn't return to active competition for the 2024–25 academic year due to the resurgence of COVID-19 in the United States.

In June 2026, NYIT announced it would return to competition, sponsoring a sprint football team as part of the Collegiate Sprint Football League.

== Varsity teams ==
NYIT sponsored an intercollegiate athletics program in 12 varsity teams:

Men's sports	Women's sports
Baseball	Basketball
Basketball	Cross country
Cross country	Lacrosse
Lacrosse	Soccer
Soccer	Softball
Track and field	Track and field

== Facilities ==
The NYIT Bears had four main facilities, which included:

Venue	Sport(s)	Notes
President's Stadium	Soccer	Capacity of 1,000-seat. In 2006, NYIT replaced the natural grass of the field with FieldTurf.
President's Stadium	Lacrosse	Capacity of 1,000-seat. In 2006, NYIT replaced the natural grass of the field with FieldTurf.
Angelo Lorenzo Memorial Field	Baseball	The field was resurfaced in the 2012–2013 academic year, with raised dugouts, a new press box behind home plate and with FieldTurf on both the infield and outfield.
Recreation Hall	Basketball	A 500-seat arena, Recreation Hall features a new hardwood floor installed in 2019.
Tech Softball Complex	Softball	

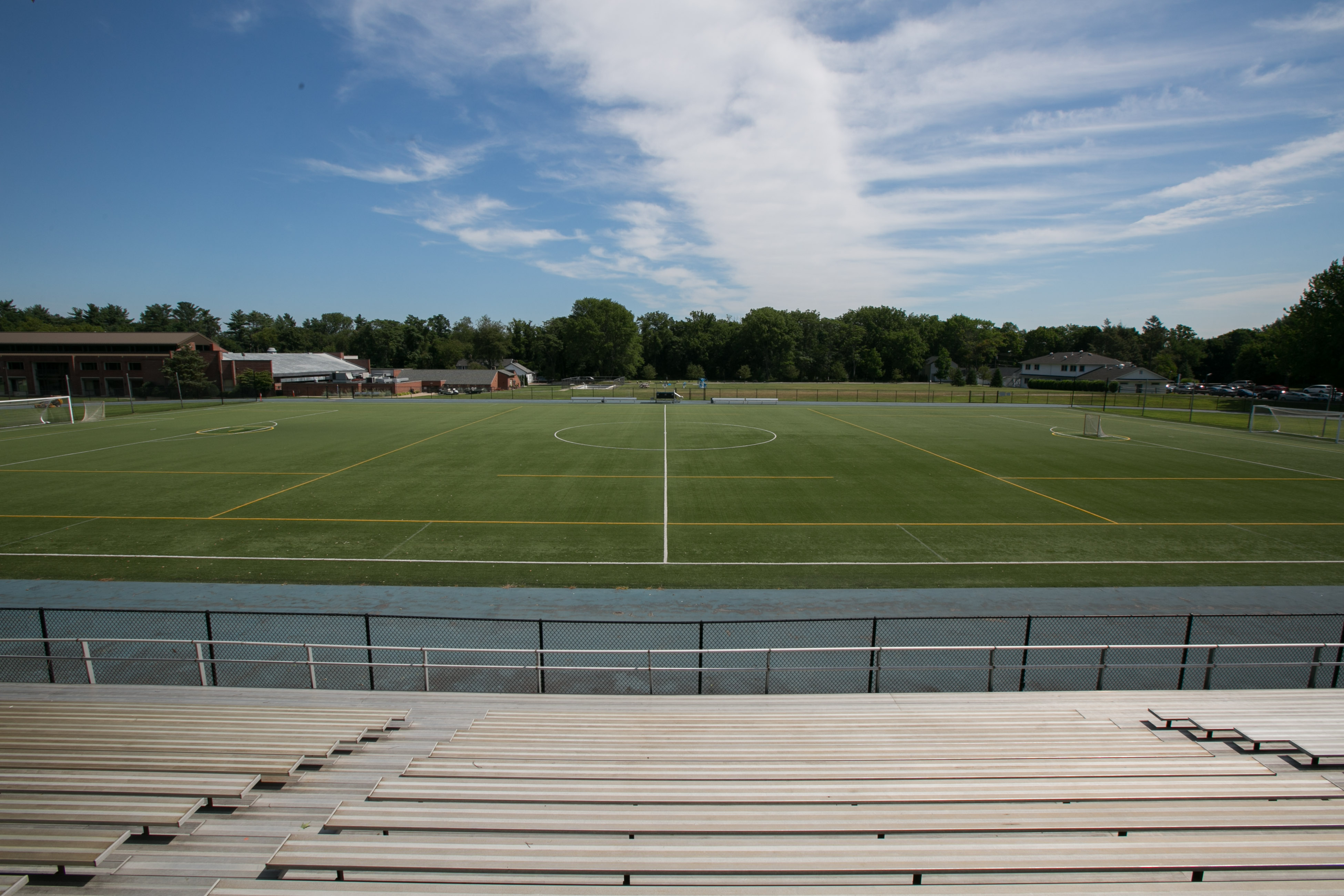
President's Stadium

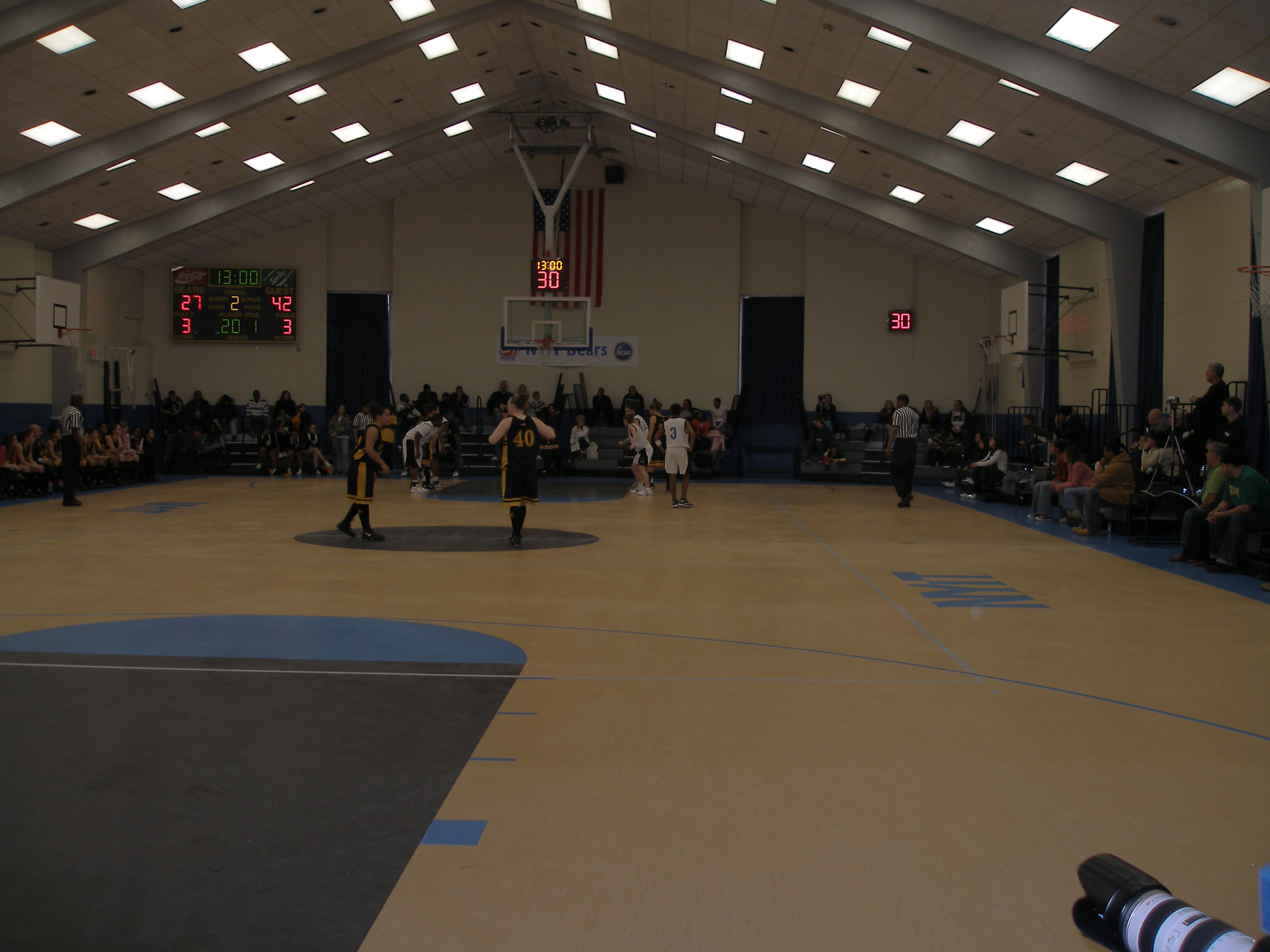
Recreation Hall

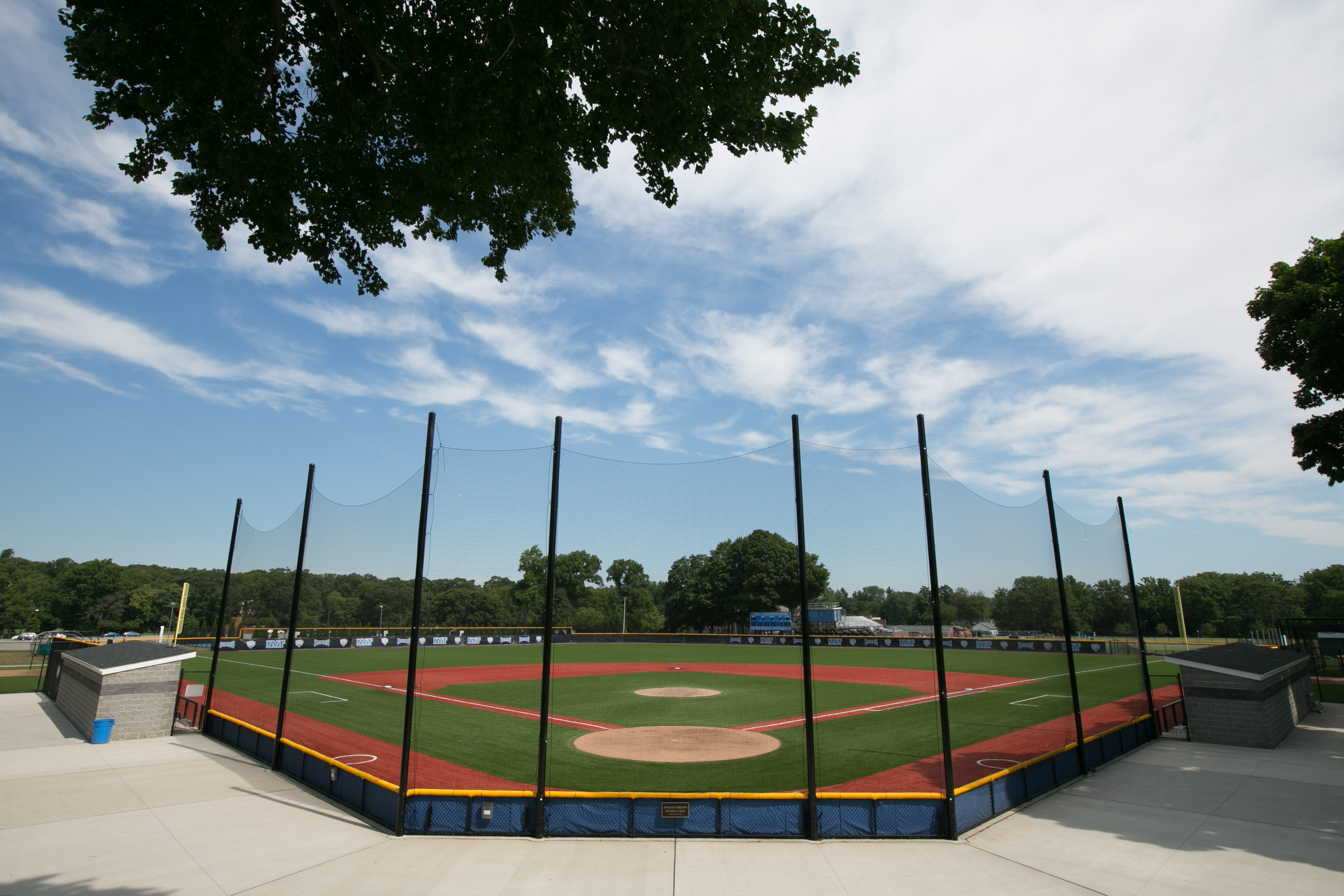
Angelo Lorenzo Field

== Achievements ==
=== Baseball ===
Led by Bob Hirschfield until 2012, the NY Tech baseball team was the only sport that competed at the NCAA Division I level, as an independent after being a member of the ECAC for many years. With over 650 wins, Coach Hirschfield helped over 60 players reach the next level and sign professional contracts with 5 members being selected as Division 1 All Americans. The most recent signings were Joe Esposito, Mike Laluna, Kraig Binick, Chris Briller, Mike Roth, Lou Bernardi, Jon Burke, Andrew Gurassi, Miike Fernandez, Steve Faulkner, George Carroll, Danny Lackner and Frank Valentino. Some of the more notable professional signings in recent and past years were Al Watson, Don Cooper, Brian Brady, Al Labozetta, Bill DaCosta, Ray Giannelli, Alan Ashkinazy, Mike Gaffney, Chris Rojas, Brian Goelz, and Jimmy Goelz.

The Bears opened their newly renovated ball park in 2014 and also began playing as an independent, following the demise of the Great West Conference

In the fall of 2017, Tech moved its baseball program to Division II after being a member of Division 1 since 1983. It now matched the rest of its athletic programs. The school requested that the NCAA grant the team immediate eligibility rather than going through the usual two-year transition period, and this was granted, allowing the team to immediately compete in the East Coast Conference and able to qualify for the NCAA Division II championship.

Under first-year coach Frank Catalanotto in 2019, the program reached the College World Series for the first time in program history.

=== Men's basketball ===
In 1980, the men's basketball team made its first and only appearance in the NCAA Division II national championship game, losing 80–74 to Virginia Union. Several Bears have gone on to play professionally overseas including Bryant Lassiter, Manix Auriantal, and Kirk Stewart. After serving as interim head coach for the final two games of the 2018–19 season, Evan Conti became head coach for the 2019–20 season.

- NCAA Tournament Appearances: 1978, 1980, 2004
- ECC Championship: 2006-2007

=== Women's basketball ===
In 2005–2006, the women's basketball team made its first appearance in the East Coast Conference tournament. The Bears advanced to the championship game. NYIT made another run at the ECC title in 2006–07. In 2009–2010, Anthony Crocitto was named head coach of the women's basketball program and since then the Bears have doubled their wins total each season. In 2011–2012, NYIT produced the program's best record in school history (16-13). The Bears made it back to the ECC Tournament but lost in the first round to neighboring LIU Post. In the 2014–15 season, the Bears lost in the ECC Championship to Queens College (N.Y.). Under third-year coach Kenny Parham, the program won its first East Coast Conference postseason championship in 2019.

=== Lacrosse ===
During lacrosse coach Jack Kaley's tenure (1993-2009), Tech's lacrosse team rose to become a national powerhouse. Under Kaley, the Bears had a record of 152–28. They won the East Coast Conference championship four consecutive years (2002-2005). They have reached the NCAA Division II national championship game six times, and have won the national championship four times, including an undefeated season in 2003. Upon Kaley's retirement, Bill Dunn was appointed head coach. Since Bill Dunn has been appointed head coach, the Bears have won the East Coast Conference Championships in 2017 and 2018.

- NCAA National Finalists: 1994, 1997, 2002, 2003, 2005, 2008
- NCAA National Championships: 1997, 2003, 2005, 2008

=== Men's soccer ===
Since coach Carlos Delcid took over in 2001, NYIT's soccer team has become one of the best in the nation. In 2003, the Bears advanced to the NCAA playoffs after an absence of 18 years, when the Bears advanced to the NCAA Final Four in 1985. They have established a school record of 13 wins in a row and have been ranked as high as no. 7 in the nation. In 2005, the men's soccer team advanced to the NCAA Division II Elite Eight. They lost on penalty kicks to Franklin Pierce College. The Bears won their first ECC Championship in 2011 off a goal from Senior Danilo Hernandez. NYIT men's soccer has four All-Americans: Vinny Caccavale (2012), Kyle Cupid (2007), Eduardo Anacelto (2005), and Algernon Lawrence (1984).

=== Softball ===
The softball team made its first appearance in the NCAA tournament in 2009.

== Notable alumni ==
- Don Cooper: Baseball (Pitching Coach, Chicago White Sox, Member of 2005 World Series Championship team)
- Ray Giannelli: Baseball
- Allen Watson: Baseball (Member of 2000 World Series Champion New York Yankees)
