= Larry Rothschild =

American baseball player and coach (born 1954)

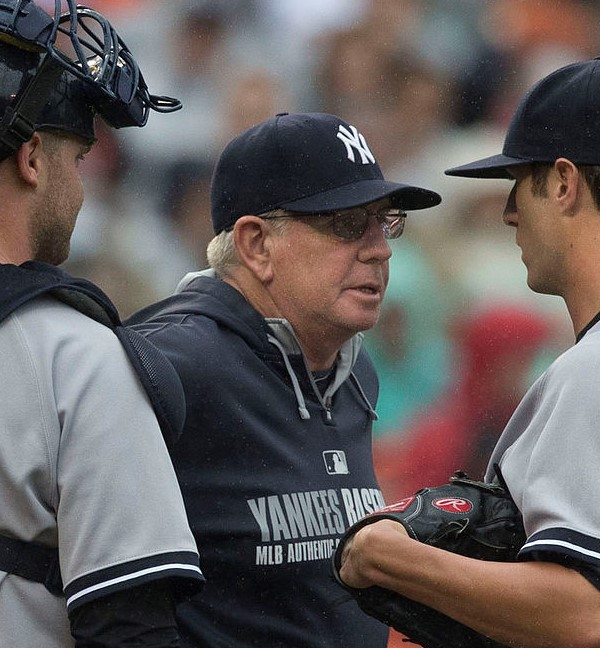
- Rothschild as pitching coach for the Yankees in 2014
- Pitcher / Manager / Coach
- Born: March 12, 1954 (age 72); Chicago, Illinois, U.S.
- Batted: Left Threw: Right

MLB debut
- September 11, 1981, for the Detroit Tigers

Last MLB appearance
- September 14, 1982, for the Detroit Tigers

MLB statistics
- Pitching record: 0–0
- Earned run average: 5.40
- Strikeouts: 1
- Managerial record: 205–294
- Winning %: .411
- Stats at Baseball Reference
- Managerial record at Baseball Reference

Teams
- As player: Detroit Tigers (1981–1982); As manager: Tampa Bay Devil Rays (1998–2001); As coach: Cincinnati Reds (1986–1993); Florida Marlins (1995–1997); Chicago Cubs (2002–2010); New York Yankees (2011–2019); San Diego Padres (2020–2021)

Career highlights and awards
- 2× World Series champion (1990, 1997)

Lawrence Lee Rothschild (born March 12, 1954) is an American former professional baseball pitcher, coach, and manager.

Rothschild played for the Detroit Tigers of Major League Baseball (MLB) in 1981 and 1982. He has coached for the Cincinnati Reds, Atlanta Braves, Florida Marlins, Chicago Cubs, New York Yankees, and San Diego Padres. He served as the manager of the Tampa Bay Devil Rays from 1998 through 2001, and most recently served as the pitching coach of the Padres from November 8, 2019 until August 23, 2021.

== Playing career ==
Rothschild was born in Chicago, Illinois. He graduated from Homewood-Flossmoor High School in Flossmoor, Illinois, and pitched for the Florida State Seminoles baseball team. He signed as an amateur free agent with the Cincinnati Reds in 1975.

Rothschild spent 11 years in the Cincinnati Reds, Detroit Tigers, San Diego Padres, and Chicago Cubs organizations as a relief pitcher from 1975 to 1985. He was 66–46 with 50 saves in the minor leagues. He pitched in seven games in the major leagues for the Tigers, five in 1981 and two in 1982.

== Coaching and managing career ==
=== Early coaching career ===
Rothschild then worked as a coach with the Reds from 1986 to 1993, winning a World Series ring in 1990 as the team's bullpen coach.

Rothschild worked with the Atlanta Braves as a pitching instructor in 1994 before joining the Florida Marlins in 1995 and staying until 1997, where he won another World Series ring in 1997.

=== Tampa Bay Devil Rays ===
Rothschild managed the Tampa Bay Devil Rays beginning in their inaugural season of 1998 until early in the 2001 season, when he was fired as a result of three consecutive losing seasons and a 4–10 start to 2001. During his time in Tampa Bay, Rothschild compiled a record of 205 wins and 294 losses.

He spent the remainder of 2001 as a consultant with the Florida Marlins.

=== Chicago Cubs ===
In 2002, Rothschild was hired as the Chicago Cubs pitching coach. He served in this role until 2010.

=== New York Yankees ===
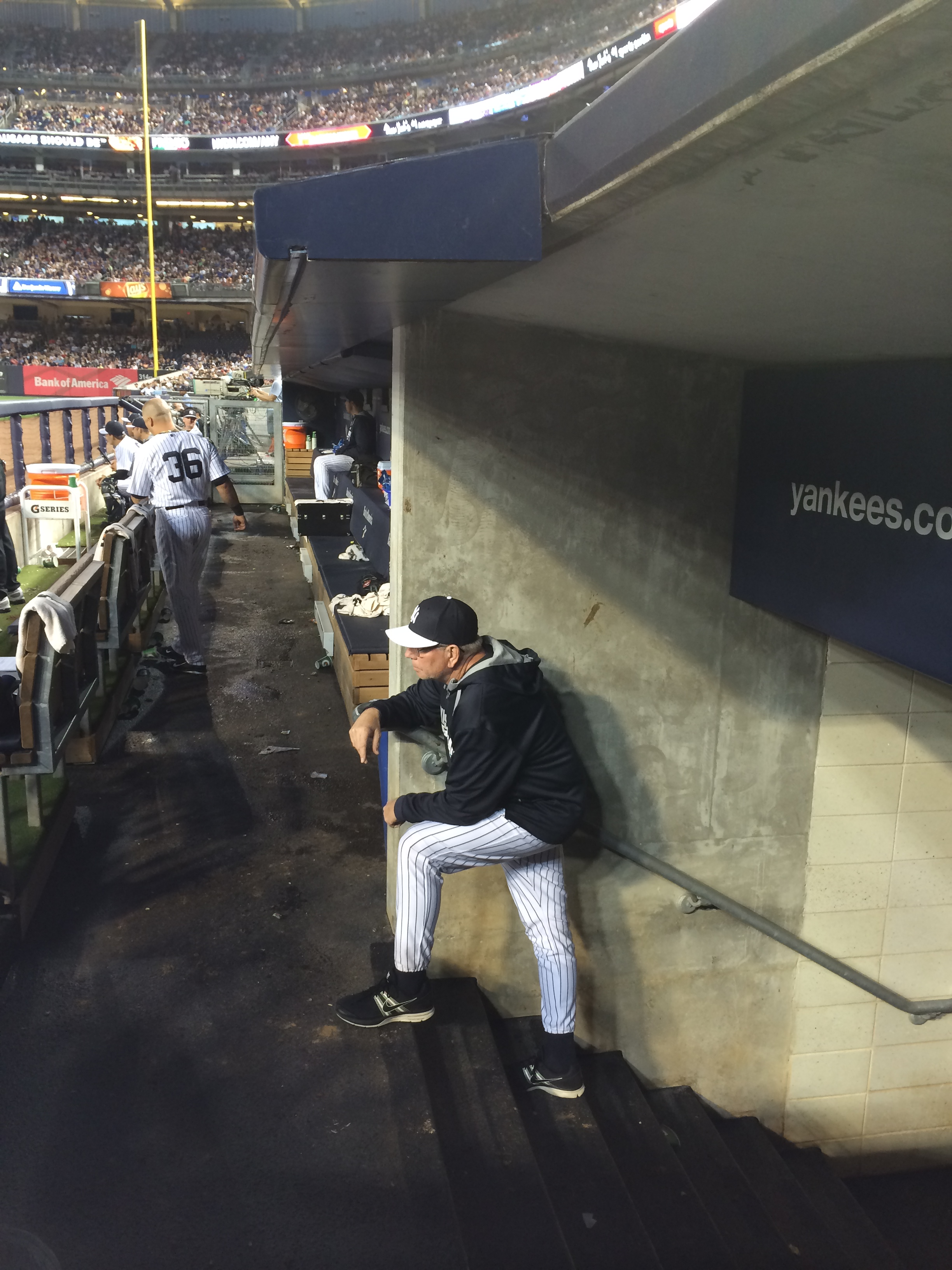
Rothschild in the Yankees dugout in 2014

Prior to the 2011 season, Rothschild signed a three-year contract from the New York Yankees after Dave Eiland was fired. Under Rothschild's tenure, the Yankees pitching staff has posted a 3.73 ERA in 2011, a 3.84 ERA in 2012, a 3.94 ERA in 2013, a 3.75 ERA in 2014, and a 4.05 ERA in 2015.

On October 17, 2013, Rothschild signed a one-year contract to remain with the Yankees. His contract was renewed through the 2016 season. On October 7, 2016, he signed a one-year deal to remain with the Yankees through the 2017 season. Under Rothschild, starter Luis Severino finished with a 14-6 record with a 2.98 ERA, fourth in the league.

During the 2017 season, the Yankees were fined after a phone conversation between Rothschild and replay room officials.

On November 14, 2017, Rothschild signed a one-year contract to remain with the Yankees for the 2018 season.

On October 28, 2019, the Yankees fired Rothschild.

=== San Diego Padres ===
On November 8, 2019, Rothschild was hired as the pitching coach of the San Diego Padres. On August 23, 2021, despite the Padres having a top 10 pitching staff ERA and a top 3 bullpen ERA and weathering a myriad of injuries on their pitching staff, Rothschild was fired.

=== Windy City ThunderBolts ===
On January 30, 2024, Rothschild was announced as a pitching consultant for the Windy City ThunderBolts of the Frontier League.

== Managerial record ==
| Team | Year | Regular season | | | | | Postseason | | | |
| Team | Year | Games | Won | Lost | Win % | Finish | Won | Lost | Win % | Result |
|---|---|---|---|---|---|---|---|---|---|---|
| TB | 1998 | 162 | 63 | 99 | .389 | 5th in AL East | – | – | – | – |
| TB | 1999 | 162 | 69 | 93 | .426 | 5th in AL East | – | – | – | – |
| TB | 2000 | 161 | 69 | 92 | .429 | 5th in AL East | – | – | – | – |
| TB | 2001 | 14 | 4 | 10 | .286 | fired | – | – | – | – |
| Total | | 499 | 205 | 294 | .411 | | 0 | 0 | – | |

== Personal life ==
Rothschild was born in Chicago, Illinois. He attended Morgan Park Academy for two years (1967-1969) before graduating from Homewood-Flossmoor High School. He has three children with his wife, Jane.

Sporting positions
| Preceded by Rick Williams | Florida Marlins Pitching Coach; 1997 | Succeeded by Rich Dubee |
| Preceded by Oscar Acosta | Chicago Cubs Pitching Coach; 2002–2010 | Succeeded by Mark Riggins |
| Preceded by Dave Eiland | New York Yankees Pitching Coach; 2011–2019 | Succeeded by Matt Blake |
