= Chris Wimmer (baseball) =

American baseball player and scout

- Infielder
- Born: September 25, 1970 (age 55); Wichita, Kansas, U.S.
- Bats: Right Throws: Right
- Stats at Baseball Reference
Medals
Men's baseball
Representing United States
Pan American Games
Bronze medal – third place	1991 Havana	Team

Christopher Steven Wimmer (born September 25, 1970) is an American professional baseball player and scout.

Wimmer attended Wichita State University, where he played college baseball for the Wichita State Shockers. He was a two-time All-American, and led the NCAA in hits during the 1991 season. Wimmer played for the United States national baseball team in the 1992 Summer Olympics.

The San Francisco Giants selected Wimmer in the eighth round of the 1992 MLB draft. In January 1996, the Giants traded him to the St. Louis Cardinals as the player to be named later in the December 1995 trade that sent Royce Clayton to the Cardinals for Doug Creek, Rich DeLucia, and Allen Watson. After he retired, Wimmer became a scout for the Detroit Tigers.
