= Ray Giannelli =

American baseball player (born 1966)

- Third baseman
- Born: February 5, 1966 (age 59); Brooklyn, New York, U.S.
- Batted: Left Threw: Right

MLB debut
- May 4, 1991, for the Toronto Blue Jays

Last MLB appearance
- October 1, 1995, for the St. Louis Cardinals

MLB statistics
- Batting average: .143
- Home runs: 0
- Runs batted in: 0
- Stats at Baseball Reference

Teams
- Toronto Blue Jays (1991); St. Louis Cardinals (1995)

Raymond John Giannelli (born February 5, 1966) is an American former professional baseball third baseman. He played in Major League Baseball (MLB) for the Toronto Blue Jays during the 1991 season and for the St. Louis Cardinals in 1995.

Giannelli attended Walter G. O'Connell Copiague High School and played college baseball at NYIT. He was drafted by the Blue Jays in the 38th round of the 1988 Major League Baseball draft. He was named a South Atlantic League All-Star in 1989 while playing for the Myrtle Beach Blue Jays.

Giannelli was released twice by two different organizations during the 1996 season, the first two times he was released during his career.

His father played professional baseball for seven years in the Detroit Tigers farm system. Giannelli and his wife, Michelle, had a son, Matthew, in 1996.
