= Terry Bradshaw (baseball) =

American baseball player & coach (born 1969)

- Outfielder / Coach
- Born: February 3, 1969 (age 57); Franklin, Virginia, U.S.
- Batted: Left Threw: Right

MLB debut
- May 4, 1995, for the St. Louis Cardinals

Last MLB appearance
- September 29, 1996, for the St. Louis Cardinals

MLB statistics
- Batting average: .262
- Hits: 17
- Runs: 10
- Stats at Baseball Reference

Teams
- As player: St. Louis Cardinals (1995–1996); As coach: Kansas City Royals (2018–2022); Cincinnati Reds (2023–2024)

Terry Leon Bradshaw (born February 3, 1969) is an American professional baseball coach and former outfielder. He was the hitting coach for the Kansas City Royals of Major League Baseball (MLB). During his playing days, he threw right-handed, batted left-handed and was listed as 6 feet (1.8 m) tall and 180 pounds (82 kg).

== Career ==
=== Playing career ===
Born in Franklin, Virginia, Bradshaw graduated from Windsor High School (Virginia) and attended Norfolk State University. He was selected by the St. Louis Cardinals in the ninth round of the 1990 Major League Baseball draft and played for five seasons in the Cardinals' minor league system, and stole 65 bases in the Class A South Atlantic League. As a rookie with the 1995 Cardinals, Bradshaw had three hits in his first three MLB at bats from May 4–6 against the Houston Astros. But he spent most of that season at Triple-A Louisville.

In parts of two seasons with the Cardinals (1995–96), he collected 17 total hits in 34 games played, including two doubles and one triple. His minor league career extended until 1999 and included time in the minor league organizations of the Royals and Montreal Expos.

In 2023 he was elected in the Norfolk State Hall of Fame, and was the first player from NSU to play in Major League Baseball.

=== Coaching career ===
He had served as a coach in the Kansas City Royals organization since 2000. He spent 2013 through 2017 as the Royals' minor league hitting coordinator, and was promoted to Royals hitting coach prior to the 2018 season. The Royals fired him on May 16, 2022.

On November 29, 2022, Bradshaw was hired by the Cincinnati Reds to serve as their assistant hitting coach for the 2023 season. He spent two years with the Reds before being fired, along with the team's other two hitting coaches, at the conclusion of the 2024 season.

Preceded by Dale Sveum	Kansas City Royals hitting coach 2018	Succeeded by Alec Zumwalt
