= Palmball =

Baseball pitch

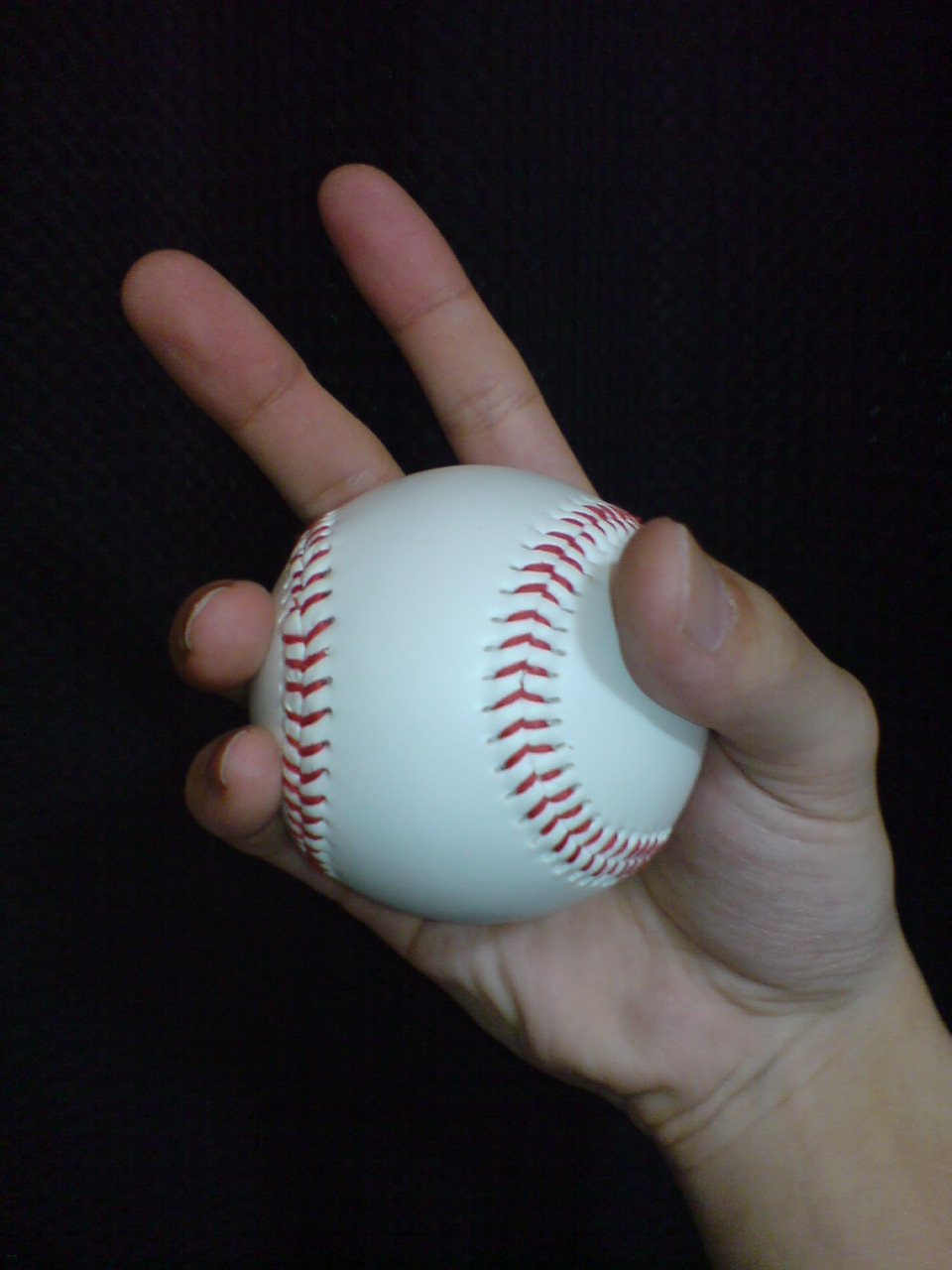
The grip used for a palmball

In baseball, the palmball pitch is a type of changeup. It requires placing the baseball tightly in the palm or held between the thumb and ring finger and then throwing it as if throwing a fastball. This takes some of the velocity off the pitch, intending to make the batter swing before the ball reaches the plate.

Notable pitchers who have been known to throw the palmball include Ray Sadecki, Steve Farr, Robinson Tejeda, Ed Whitson, Edwar Ramírez, Dave Giusti, Bob Stanley, Orlando Hernández, Mark Williamson, John Holdzkom, Randy Martz, reliever Tony Fiore, Bryn Smith, and 1990s reliever Joe Boever. Former Philadelphia Phillies and Toronto Blue Jays ace Roy Halladay was known to have thrown a palmball early in his career, though he rarely used it later on.

Second on the all-time saves list, Trevor Hoffman, made his palmball changeup his "out" pitch.

One of the more recent pitchers to utilize a palmball consistently in their repertoire is Taiwanese pitcher Chih-Wei Hu, who pitched for Tampa Bay Rays from 2017 to 2018.

In earlier decades, the palmball was thrown by Ewell Blackwell, NL MVP winner Jim Konstanty, Cy Young Award winner Jim Palmer, and Satchel Paige. In 1968, Red Sox starter Ray Culp turned his career around by developing a palmball. Culp went 16-6 in 1968 and topped the Red Sox in wins from 1968–1970.

== Slip pitch ==
The slip pitch was a similar pitch taught by Paul Richards to many young pitchers throughout Richards' career. As it is very similar to the palmball, slip pitch and palmball are often used interchangeably.
