= Dave Eiland =

American baseball player and coach (born 1966)

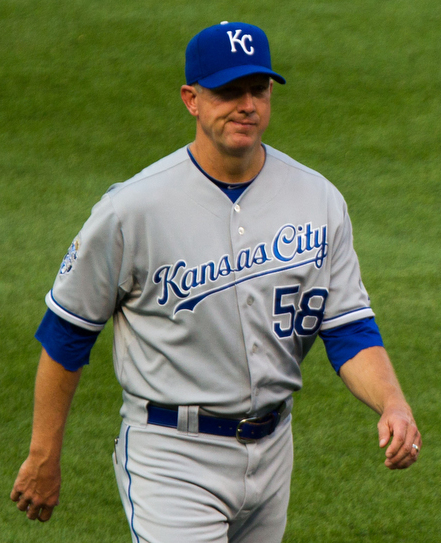
- Eiland with the Kansas City Royals
- Pitcher / Pitching coach
- Born: July 5, 1966 (age 60); Dade City, Florida, U.S.
- Batted: Right Threw: Right

MLB debut
- August 3, 1988, for the New York Yankees

Last MLB appearance
- September 10, 2000, for the Tampa Bay Devil Rays

MLB statistics
- Win–loss record: 12–27
- Earned run average: 5.74
- Strikeouts: 153
- Stats at Baseball Reference

Teams
- As player: New York Yankees (1988–1991); San Diego Padres (1992–1993); New York Yankees (1995); Tampa Bay Devil Rays (1998–2000); As coach: New York Yankees (2008–2010); Kansas City Royals (2011–2017); New York Mets (2018–2019)

Career highlights and awards
- 2× World Series champion (2009, 2015)

David William Eiland (born July 5, 1966) is an American former professional baseball player who was a pitcher for ten Major League Baseball seasons. Eiland played college baseball for the University of Florida and the University of South Florida, and thereafter, played professionally for the New York Yankees, San Diego Padres and Tampa Bay Devil Rays. He has also been a pitching coach for the New York Yankees, the New York Mets and the Kansas City Royals.

== Amateur career ==
He attended Zephyrhills High School, where he baseball, football, basketball, and golf. Eiland was an all-conference first team selection in football as a wide receiver and punter. He was a three-time all-conference winner in baseball as well. The school later retired the number 14 in his honor.

Eiland accepted a football scholarship to attend the University of Florida in Gainesville, Florida; however, he suffered a shoulder injury before the 1984 season and never played football for the Gators. In the Spring of 1985, he pitched 17 innings for the Gator baseball team, posting a 1-0 record with one save, and an ERA of 1.59. Eiland was one of nine future Major Leaguers on that 1985 Gator roster.

In 1986, he transferred to the University of South Florida in Tampa and finished his collegiate career playing for the Bulls baseball team. That summer, he played collegiate summer baseball with the Falmouth Commodores of the Cape Cod Baseball League. He was an All-Sun Belt Conference selection and a preseason All-America selection in 1987.

== Professional career ==
=== New York Yankees ===
The New York Yankees selected Eiland in the seventh round of the 1987 MLB draft. He was fast-tracked through the system, starting the 1988 season at Double-A Albany before getting called up to Triple-A Columbus in July. Eiland made his major league debut with the Yankees on August 3, 1988. He allowed three hits in seven innings, including a home run to the first batter he faced, Paul Molitor.

Eiland spent four years in the organization, bouncing between the big leagues and the minors. In 1990, while pitching for the Columbus Clippers, he tied an International League record for wins in a 16-5 season, and was named the league's Pitcher of the Year. He then earned a spot in the rotation to start the 1991 season, but pitched to a 5.33 ERA in 72.2 innings. Eiland missed two months to a heel injury, and later admitted to pitching while hurt after returning.

On January 9, 1992, he was designated for assignment by the Yankees. Unhappy with the decision, he told the media "it was a stupid move on the part of the Yankees and I'm looking forward to leaving."

=== San Diego Padres ===
He signed with the San Diego Padres in 1992 and was named the team's fifth starter to begin the season. On April 10, he hit a home run in his first plate appearance, facing Bob Ojeda of the Los Angeles Dodgers. It was the only home run Eiland hit in 27 plate appearances, but it made him the only player in MLB history to give up a home run to the first batter he faced and hit a homer in his first plate appearance.

Eiland re-signed with the Padres for the 1993 season, but was designated for assignment in May after pitching to a 5.21 ERA in 10 games. He became a free agent when he refused an outright assignment.

=== Cleveland Indians ===
After becoming a free agent, Eiland latched on with the Cleveland Indians and pitched in Triple-A. He had a 5.30 ERA in eight starts for the Charlotte Knights.

=== Texas Rangers ===
On August 4, 1993, he was traded to the Texas Rangers for Gerald Alexander and Allan Anderson. He had a 4.29 ERA in seven starts for the Oklahoma City 89ers.

=== New York Yankees (second stint) ===
He returned to the Yankees in 1994, spending the entire strike-shortened season in Triple-A. Eiland re-signed with the Yankees for the 1995 season and was finally recalled on July 19 to make a spot start. On July 21, he earned his first major league win since 1991.

=== St. Louis Cardinals ===
On December 6, 1995, Eiland signed a minor league deal with the St. Louis Cardinals and started the season in Triple-A. He pitched to a 5.55 ERA in eight games with the Louisville Redbirds before he was released in June.

=== New York Yankees (third stint) ===
He re-signed with the Yankees for a third time and spent most of the 1996 season with the Columbus Clippers. Eiland spent the last two weeks of the season with the Yankees but didn't pitch. He spent the 1997 season in Triple-A, compiling a 6.64 ERA in 62.1 innings while dealing with tendinitis. He left the Clippers as the team's all-time leader in wins (67), innings pitched (767) and strikeouts (437).

=== Tampa Bay Devil Rays ===
Eiland considered retiring at the end of the 1997 season before signing a minor league deal with the Tampa Bay Devil Rays in December 1997. He was a non-roster invitee that spring but ultimately started the year in Triple-A. Despite pitching to a 2.99 ERA in 171.2 innings for the Durham Bulls, Eiland was not called up to the majors until September 25, 1998.

He returned to the Devil Rays in 1999 and was called up in May and maintained a 5.60 ERA in 80.1 innings between the rotation and bullpen. Eiland made the 2000 Devil Rays out of spring training as the team's long reliever. That year, he held a 7.24 ERA in 54.2 innings as a starter and reliever.

=== Oakland Athletics ===
On December 6, 2000, Eiland signed a minor league deal with the Oakland Athletics. However, he ultimately never pitched in a competitive game with the organization. He missed the entire 2001 season after undergoing Tommy John surgery, and then re-tore the ligament in April 2002. Despite initially being hopeful that he would be able to return, Eiland was ultimately forced to retire.

== Coaching career ==
=== New York Yankees ===
After retiring, Eiland joined the Yankees organization and worked as a pitching coach in the minor leagues, starting with the Gulf Coast Yankees in 2003. In June, he was reassigned to the Staten Island Yankees in Short Season A-ball. Eiland returned to Staten Island for the 2004 season.

He next coached the Trenton Thunder in 2005 and 2006 before making the jump to Triple-A as the pitching coach of the Scranton/Wilkes-Barre Yankees in 2007. During his tenure in the Yankees farm system, Eiland oversaw the development of prospects including Phil Hughes, Joba Chamberlain, and Ian Kennedy.

Following the 2007 season, Joe Torre and several Yankees coaches—including pitching coach Ron Guidry—were dismissed. Dave Eiland was hired as the new Yankees pitching coach for Joe Girardi's staff. During his time with the team, Eiland worked extensively with the struggling A.J. Burnett.

He took a personal leave of absence from the Yankees beginning on June 4, 2010, and returned to the team on June 29. Though the reason for the absence was never explained, Eiland later alluded to it being related to a family issue. It was noted that while he was away from the team, Burnett was 0–5 with an 11.35 ERA in five starts.

On October 25, Eiland was fired by Brian Cashman. He later said he was shocked by the decision. When asked about the dismissal, Cashman told reporters "He knows why. He was given conditions that needed to be followed. So he knows why." Eiland then hired agent Burton Rocks.

=== Tampa Bay Rays ===
After the 2010 season, Eiland joined the Tampa Bay Rays as a special assistant to general manager Andrew Friedman.

=== Kansas City Royals ===
On October 25, 2011, Eiland was named as the pitching coach for the Kansas City Royals, where he would remain through the team's 2015 World Series win. He was let go by the Royals after the 2017 season.

=== New York Mets ===
When the Mets named Mickey Callaway as their manager after the 2017 season, Eiland was hired as the team's pitching coach. He worked with Jacob deGrom to simplify his approach, helping him win the Cy Young Award in 2018 and 2019. Eiland also helped Steven Matz develop a delivery that was less stressful on his body. He helped Zack Wheeler change his mechanics in order to improve his timing and increase his velocity. Eiland was fired on June 20, 2019.

=== Lexington Legends ===
On March 2, 2021, Eiland was named pitching coach for the Lexington Legends of the Atlantic League of Professional Baseball.

=== Pensacola Blue Wahoos ===
In 2022, Eiland was hired by the Miami Marlins organization to be the pitching coach for the Pensacola Blue Wahoos in Double-A. He returned for the 2023 season.

== Personal life ==
Eiland was born in Dade City, Florida to Bill and June. He grew up in Zephyrhills, where his father was the police chief. He and his wife Sandra had two daughters, Nicole and Natalie.

During his time with the Devil Rays, Eiland acted as a body double for Kevin Costner, who played a starting pitcher and run scorer in the 1999 film For Love of the Game.

He was a 2012 inductee in the International League Hall of Fame.

== See also ==
- Florida Gators
- List of Florida Gators baseball players
- List of Major League Baseball players with a home run in their first major league at bat

Sporting positions
Preceded by Ron Guidry	New York Yankees pitching coach 2008–2010	Succeeded by Larry Rothschild
Preceded by Bob McClure	Kansas City Royals pitching coach 2011–2017	Succeeded by Cal Eldred
Preceded by Dan Warthen	New York Mets pitching coach 2018–2019	Succeeded by Phil Regan
