= Ramón Caraballo =

Dominican baseball player (born 1969)

- Second baseman
- Born: May 23, 1969 (age 56); Río San Juan, María Trinidad Sánchez, Dominican Republic
- Batted: Both Threw: Right

MLB debut
- September 9, 1993, for the Atlanta Braves

Last MLB appearance
- August 15, 1995, for the St. Louis Cardinals

MLB statistics
- Batting average: .202
- Home runs: 2
- Runs batted in: 3
- Stats at Baseball Reference

Teams
- Atlanta Braves (1993); St. Louis Cardinals (1995)

Ramón Caraballo Sánchez (born May 23, 1969) is a Dominican former Major League Baseball player and current Hitting coach for the DSL Orioles. He played two season with the Atlanta Braves and St. Louis Cardinals in 1993 and 1995.
