= Trevor Enders =

American baseball player (born 1974)

- Pitcher
- Born: December 22, 1974 (age 51); Milwaukee, Wisconsin, U.S.
- Batted: Right Threw: Left

MLB debut
- September 2, 2000, for the Tampa Bay Devil Rays

Last MLB appearance
- September 29, 2000, for the Tampa Bay Devil Rays

MLB statistics
- Win–loss record: 0–1
- Earned run average: 10.61
- Strikeouts: 5
- Stats at Baseball Reference

Teams
- Tampa Bay Devil Rays (2000)

Trevor Hale Enders (born December 22, 1974) is an American former professional baseball pitcher. He played in Major League Baseball (MLB) for the Tampa Bay Devil Rays.

== Career ==
Enders was born to William Enders and Barbara (nee Frost) in Milwaukee, Wisconsin. He and his family moved to Northbrook, Illinois and then to Houston, Texas when he was young. He was a pitcher who batted right-handed, threw left-handed, and is 6 foot 1. Enders attended college at Houston Baptist University. He played one season in the Majors as a member of the Tampa Bay Devil Rays in the 2000 season. In nine career games pitched in relief, Enders had an 0–1 record in 9 1/3 innings pitched, allowed 14 hits and had 5 strikeouts.
