= Rick Williams (baseball, born 1956) =

American baseball coach, former player and scout

Richard Anthony Williams (born November 21, 1956, in Fort Worth, Texas) is a former Minor League Baseball pitcher and Major League Baseball (MLB) coach who is an MLB scout for the Los Angeles Angels.

== Early life ==
Williams is the son of the late Dick Williams, Hall of Fame manager of six Major League teams between 1967 and 1988. He attended the University of South Alabama, where he played baseball under former big-league second baseman and manager Eddie Stanky.

== Playing career ==
Williams was signed by the Montreal Expos out of college. Williams went 3–1 with a 2.90 ERA for the 1977 GCL Expos (completing 3 of 4 starts) and 1-0 in four innings for the Jamestown Expos. In 1978, Williams pitched for the Double-A Memphis Chicks, as he went 7–4 with three saves and a 1.78 ERA. He was promoted to the Triple-A Denver Bears, where he struggled, going 1–1 with a 9.41 ERA.

Williams returned to Memphis in 1979 and went 5–7 with five saves and a 3.31 ERA, allowing 46 hits but 44 walks in 68 innings. He made 28 relief appearances and five starts. An arm injury derailed his career. In 1980, Williams was just 1–2 with one save and an ERA of 8.61 for Memphis, allowing 39 hits and 15 walks in 23 innings. In four games for the Class-A West Palm Beach Expos, he allowed 9 hits and five runs in four innings.

== Coaching career ==
Williams was a pitching coach for the Florida Marlins (1995–96) and Tampa Bay Devil Rays (1998–2000). He later served as special assistant to the general manager for the Devil Rays and a professional scout for the New York Yankees. He was a scout and special assistant to the general manager for the Atlanta Braves until the 2020 season. The Los Angeles Angels named him a scout on November 22, 2020.

Preceded by Frank Reberger	Florida Marlins pitching coach 1995–1996	Succeeded by Larry Rothschild
Preceded by Franchise established	Tampa Bay Devil Rays pitching coach 1998–2000	Succeeded by Bill Fischer
