= Mark Riggins =

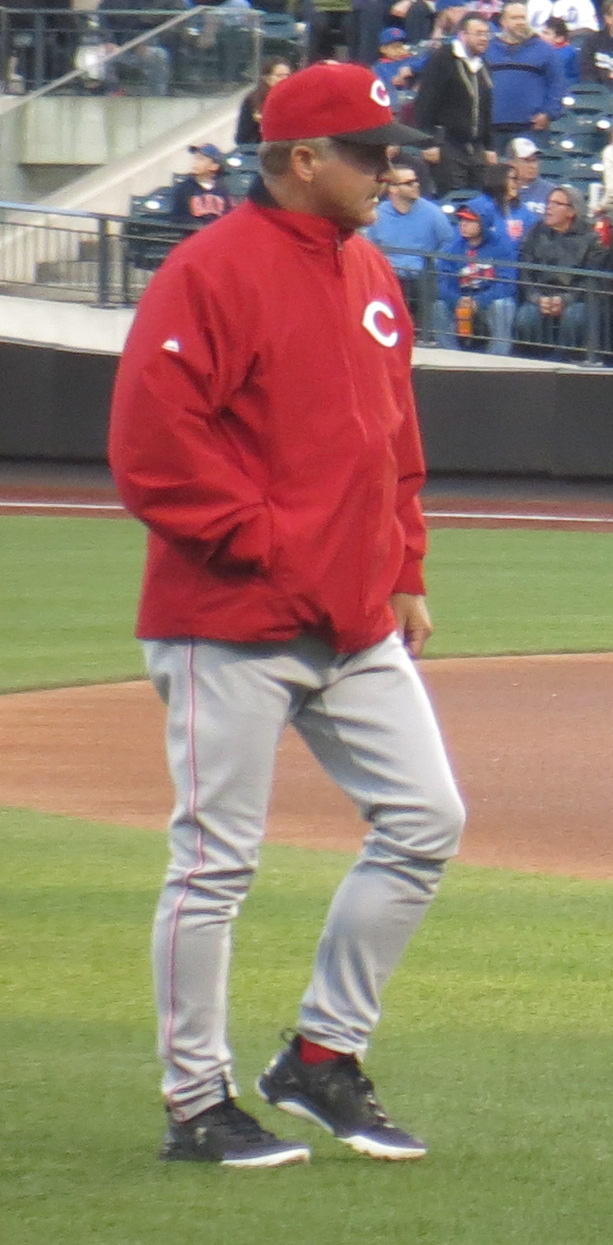
- Riggins with the Cincinnati Reds
- Pitcher / Pitching coach
- Born: January 3, 1957 (age 69); Jasper, Indiana, U.S.
- Bats: Right Throws: Left
- Stats at Baseball Reference

Teams
- St. Louis Cardinals (1995); Chicago Cubs (2011); Cincinnati Reds (2016)

Mark Alan Riggins (born January 3, 1957) is an American former professional baseball coach.

== Playing career ==
Riggins attended Murray State University and played five seasons in the minor leagues, from 1979 to 1983. He debuted with the GCL Cardinals, going 3–1 with a 2.16 ERA in 8 appearances. In 1980, Mark excelled with the St. Petersburg Cardinals. His record was 7–3 with 13 saves and a 1.86 ERA in 57 games. He led the Florida State League in saves and made the league All-Star team.

Moving up to the Arkansas Travelers in 1981, Riggins struggled, going 4–6 with one save and a 5.87 ERA. He allowed 109 hits in 89 innings of work. In 1982, Mark became a starter and fared better in a return engagement with Arkansas; his line that year was 10–8, 3.93 and he just missed the Texas League top 10 in ERA.

In his last year as a player, Riggins spent time with St. Petersburg (4–1, 1.54 in 30 games), the Louisville Redbirds (0–0, 4.85 in 5 games) and the Charlotte O's (0–2, 7.66 in 5 games).

== Coaching career ==
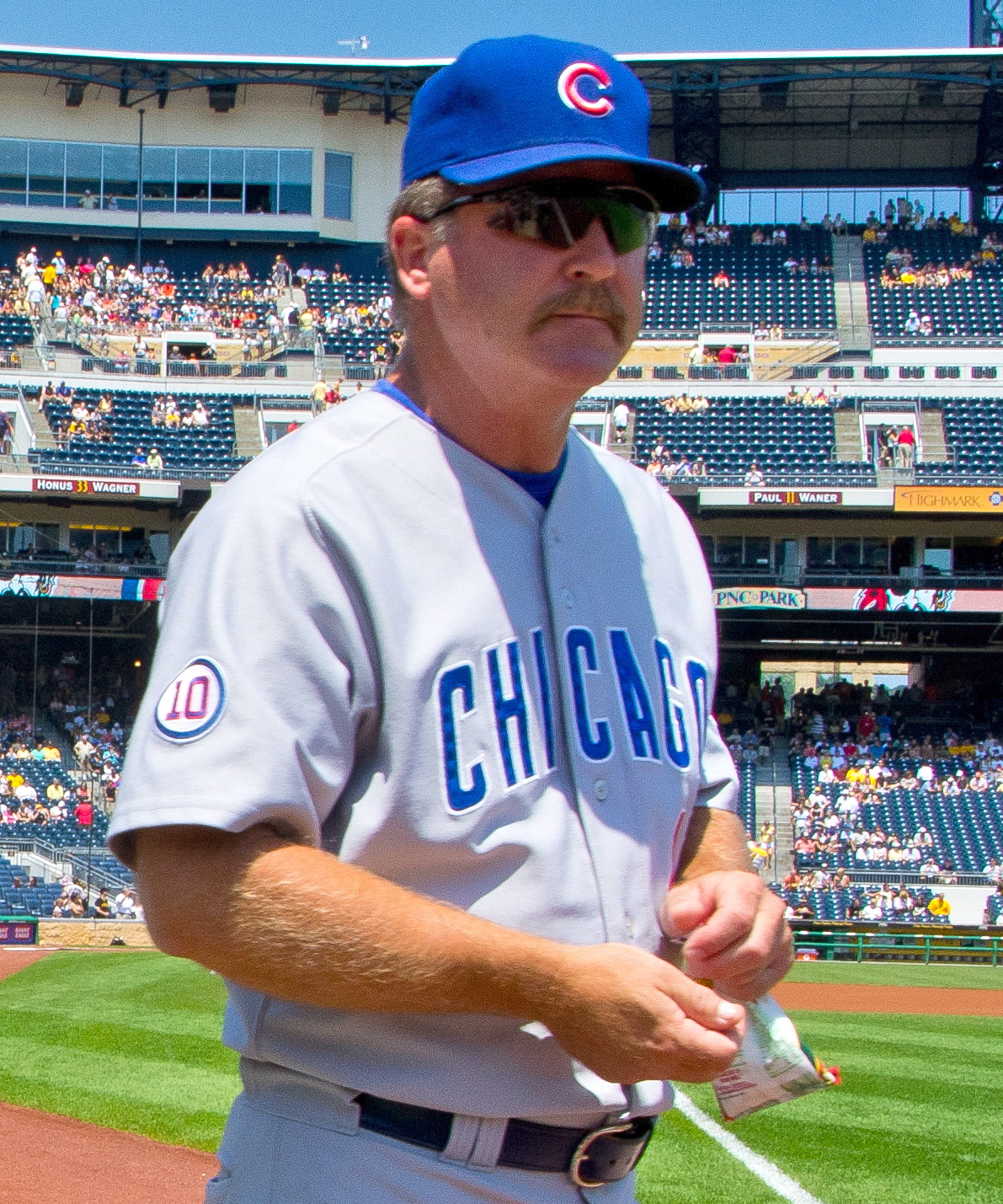
Riggins with the Cubs

After his playing days ended, he became a minor league coach. His appearances included a stint with the Springfield Cardinals in 1987. He was interim manager of the Louisville Redbirds in 1992 and the St. Louis Cardinals pitching coach in 1995. Riggins was the Cardinals' minor league pitching coordinator from 1996 to 2007 and held the same position for the Chicago Cubs in 2008–2010.

In December 2010, he was named the pitching coach for the Chicago Cubs for the 2011 season.

He spent four years as the pitching coordinator for the Cincinnati Reds minor league system. On October 21, 2015, Riggins was named pitching coach for the Cincinnati Reds. On July 4, 2016, Riggins was fired from the Cincinnati Reds.

== See also ==
- List of St. Louis Cardinals coaches
