= Tony Fiore =

American baseball player

- Pitcher
- Born: October 12, 1971 (age 54); Oak Park, Illinois, U.S.
- Batted: Right Threw: Right

MLB debut
- August 27, 2000, for the Tampa Bay Devil Rays

Last MLB appearance
- June 16, 2003, for the Minnesota Twins

MLB statistics
- Win–loss record: 12–6
- Earned run average: 4.39
- Strikeouts: 94
- Stats at Baseball Reference

Teams
- Tampa Bay Devil Rays (2000–2001); Minnesota Twins (2001–2003)

Anthony James Fiore (born October 12, 1971) is an American former right-handed Major League Baseball pitcher. In his career, he pitched for the Tampa Bay Devil Rays (2000-2001) and the Minnesota Twins (2001-2003). He was originally drafted by the Philadelphia Phillies in 1992. His signature pitch was the palmball.

His career totals are 87 appearances, 152 innings pitched, a 12–6 win–loss record and an ERA of 4.39. In 2002, he pitched in the ALDS for the Twins. In 2006, he played for the Long Island Ducks in the independent Atlantic League.
