= Brian Barber =

American baseball player (born 1973)

- Pitcher
- Born: March 4, 1973 (age 53); Hamilton, Ohio, U.S.
- Batted: Right Threw: Right

MLB debut
- August 12, 1995, for the St. Louis Cardinals

Last MLB appearance
- August 1, 1999, for the Kansas City Royals

MLB statistics
- Win–loss record: 5–8
- Earned run average: 6.77
- Strikeouts: 59
- Stats at Baseball Reference

Teams
- St. Louis Cardinals (1995–1996); Kansas City Royals (1998–1999)

Brian Scott Barber (born March 4, 1973) is an American former professional baseball starting pitcher, who played in Major League Baseball (MLB) for the St. Louis Cardinals and Kansas City Royals. He was drafted by the Cardinals in the first round of the 1991 amateur draft, and was later signed to a minor league contract. Barber threw and batted right-handed.

Barber was named the amateur scouting director of the Philadelphia Phillies, following the 2019 season.

== Early life ==
Barber's hometown is Ocoee, Florida. He attended Dr. Phillips High School in Orlando, where he won the Gatorade High School Baseball Player of the Year in 1991. Barber elected to play professional baseball, rather than attend college.

== Major league baseball career ==
At the age of 22, Barber made his MLB debut on August 12, 1995, with the Cardinals, making him the youngest player on the team, at that time. On that day, he pitched four innings, giving up three earned runs. Barber had a record of 2–1 and 5.22 earned run average (ERA). The following year, he pitched in only 3 innings, with an ERA of 15.00. Following the 1996 season, Barber found himself unhappy with the Cardinals, and on December 21, 1996, he was granted free agency. Two weeks later, Barber was signed by the Kansas City Royals. He missed the entire 1997 MLB season in the minors. In 1998, Barber re-emerged, pitching in 42 innings, while posting a 6.00 ERA. He also recorded a record of 2–4. The following year, Barber pitched in only 18.2 innings, with an ERA of 9.64, and a record of 1–3. On October 4, 1999, Barber was granted free agency again. About two months later, he was picked up by the Cleveland Indians. However, Barber would not pitch in an Indians uniform. Instead, he pitched the 2000 season for the Atlantic League Long Island Ducks, then retired.

Barber's career big league numbers included a 5–8 record, with a 6.77 ERA, 45 walks, and 59 strikeouts. He was 1 for 8 hitting, with a lifetime batting average of .125. Barber's lifetime fielding percentage was 1.000.

== Post-playing career ==
Barber spent 18 seasons with the New York Yankees, in several off-field positions, including various scouting positions.

On October 22, 2019, Barber was named the Philadelphia Phillies’ amateur scouting director.
