= Bill Fischer (baseball) =

American baseball player (1930–2018)

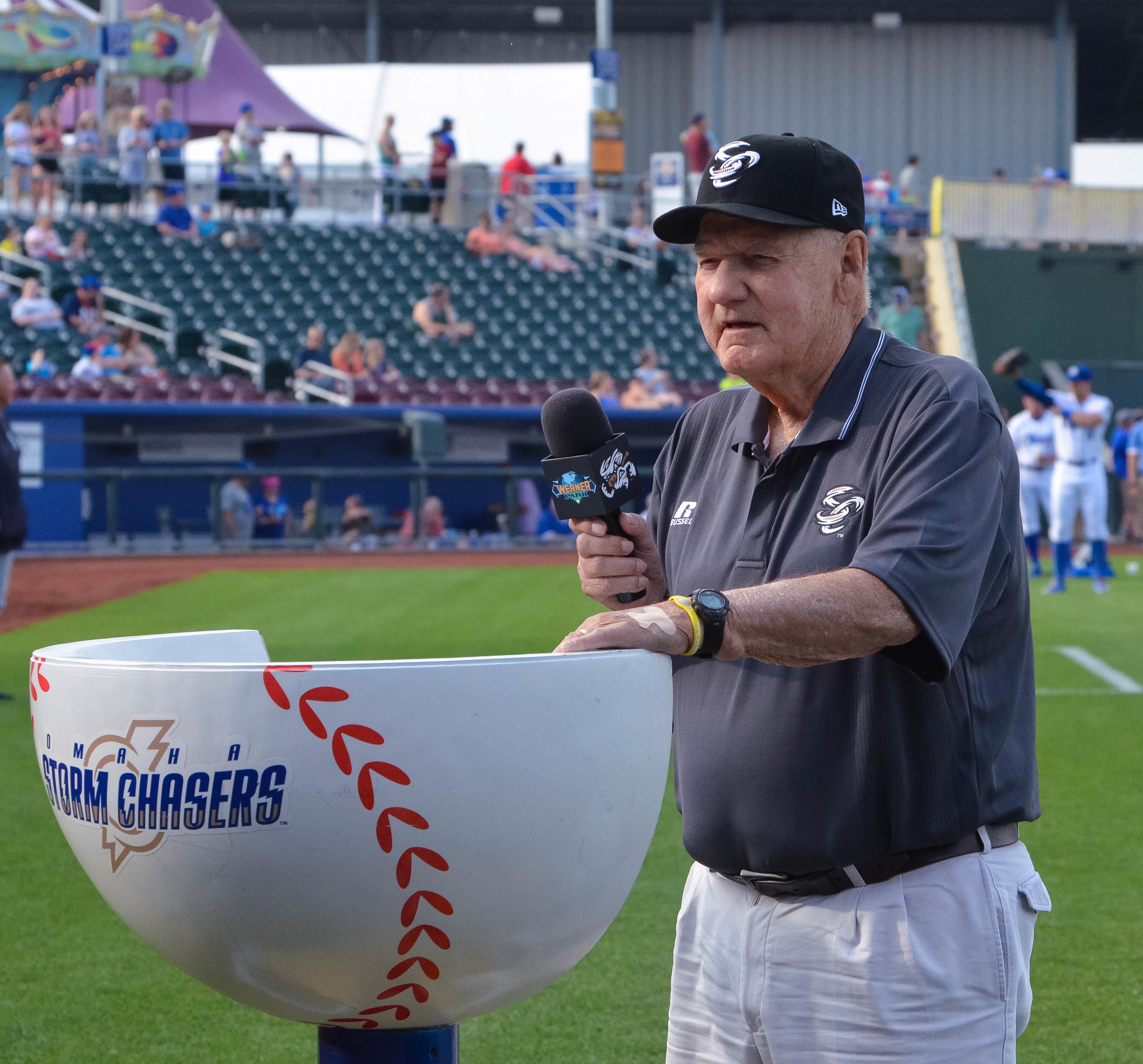
- Fischer at Werner Park in Omaha in 2015
- Pitcher
- Born: October 11, 1930; Wausau, Wisconsin, U.S.
- Died: October 30, 2018 (aged 88); Council Bluffs, Iowa, U.S.
- Batted: Right Threw: Right

MLB debut
- April 21, 1956, for the Chicago White Sox

Last MLB appearance
- May 22, 1964, for the Minnesota Twins

MLB statistics
- Win–loss record: 45–58
- Earned run average: 4.34
- Strikeouts: 313
- Stats at Baseball Reference

Teams
- As player: Chicago White Sox (1956–1958); Detroit Tigers (1958); Washington Senators (1958–1960); Detroit Tigers (1960–1961); Kansas City Athletics (1961–1963); Minnesota Twins (1964); As coach: Cincinnati Reds (1979–1983); Boston Red Sox (1985–1991); Tampa Bay Devil Rays (2000–2001)

William Charles Fischer (October 11, 1930 – October 30, 2018) was an American professional baseball pitcher who played in Major League Baseball from 1956 to 1964 for the Chicago White Sox, Detroit Tigers, Washington Senators / Minnesota Twins and Kansas City Athletics. He later was a longtime pitching coach at the major and minor league levels. Born in Wausau, Wisconsin, Fischer stood 6' (183 cm) tall, weighed 190 pounds (86 kg), and threw and batted right-handed.

== Pitching career ==
As a pitcher, Fischer won 45 games and lost 58 (.437), with a career earned run average of 4.34. He appeared in 281 games, starting 78, and compiled 16 complete games and 13 saves. In 8311/3 career innings pitched, Fischer surrendered 936 hits and 210 bases on balls, with 313 strikeouts.

Defensively, Fischer was a good fielding pitcher in his MLB career, committing only 3 errors in 229 total chances for a .987 fielding percentage, which was 28 points higher than the league average at his position.

Fischer made his debut on April 21, 1956, with the Chicago White Sox. In the middle of the 1958 campaign, he was traded along with Tito Francona to the Detroit Tigers for Ray Boone and Bob Shaw. He was eventually claimed by the Washington Senators, who traded him back to Detroit in 1960 for Tom Morgan.

Fischer was later traded to the Kansas City Athletics with Ozzie Virgil for Gerry Staley and Reno Bertoia. There, he set a major league record which still stands in pitching 841/3 consecutive innings without issuing a walk in 1962.

This didn't keep Fischer in Kansas City for long, however. After one more season with the A's, the Minnesota Twins drafted Fischer in the Rule 5 draft in 1963, and he concluded his big-league career with the club, spending a few months of the 1964 season on the inactive list as a Minnesota scout. The White Sox signed Fischer as an active player and free agent following his stint with the Twins, but he never returned to the majors and was released in 1968.

== Coaching career ==
After the 1968 season, he joined the fledgling Kansas City Royals, an expansion team set to make its MLB debut in 1969, as a scout, beginning his association with future Baseball Hall of Fame executive John Schuerholz. He also served as a minor league pitching instructor in the Royals' organization. Although Fischer never was MLB pitching coach of the Kansas City club, he held that post with the Cincinnati Reds (1979–83), Boston Red Sox (1985–91) and Tampa Bay Devil Rays (2000–01). At Boston, he was a favorite of star right-hander Roger Clemens. After his firing by the Red Sox, he rejoined Schuerholz with the Atlanta Braves as the Braves' minor league pitching coordinator and pitching coach of Triple-A Richmond (1992–99; 2004–06).

He entered the 2018 baseball season still active in the game. He rejoined the Royals in 2007 as minor league pitching coordinator and special assistant for player development, and in 2018, as Kansas City's senior pitching advisor, he marked his 69th season in professional baseball. Fischer died on October 30, 2018, at the age of 88.

== See also ==
- List of Major League Baseball individual streaks

Sporting positions
Preceded by Larry Shepard	Cincinnati Reds Pitching Coach; 1979–1983	Succeeded by Stan Williams
Preceded by Lee Stange	Boston Red Sox Pitching Coach; 1985–1991	Succeeded by Rich Gale
Preceded by Rick Williams	Tampa Bay Devil Rays Pitching Coach; 2000–2001	Succeeded by Jackie Brown
