= Doug Creek =

American baseball player (1969–2024)

- Pitcher
- Born: March 1, 1969; Winchester, Virginia, U.S.
- Died: July 28, 2024 (aged 55); Mechanicsville, Maryland, U.S.
- Batted: Left Threw: Left

Professional debut
- MLB: September 17, 1995, for the St. Louis Cardinals
- NPB: April 5, 1998, for the Hanshin Tigers

Last appearance
- MLB: October 1, 2005, for the Detroit Tigers
- NPB: October 12, 1998, for the Hanshin Tigers

MLB statistics
- Win–loss record: 7–14
- Earned run average: 5.32
- Strikeouts: 292

NPB statistics
- Win–loss record: 0–4
- Earned run average: 5.65
- Strikeouts: 24
- Stats at Baseball Reference

Teams
- St. Louis Cardinals (1995); San Francisco Giants (1996–1997); Hanshin Tigers (1998); Chicago Cubs (1999); Tampa Bay Devil Rays (2000–2002); Seattle Mariners (2002); Toronto Blue Jays (2003); Detroit Tigers (2005)
Medals
Men's baseball
Representing United States
World Junior Baseball Championship
| Silver medal – second place | 1987 Windsor | Team |

Paul Douglas Creek (March 1, 1969 – July 28, 2024) was an American professional baseball pitcher who played nine seasons in Major League Baseball (MLB) from 1995 to 2005 for seven different teams. He also played one season in Nippon Professional Baseball (NPB) for the Hanshin Tigers in 1998.

== Amateur career ==
Creek was named the West Virginia Gatorade Player of the Year at Martinsburg High School.

Creek attended Georgia Tech, and in 1990, he played collegiate summer baseball with the Cotuit Kettleers of the Cape Cod Baseball League. Creek set several school records at Georgia Tech and was later inducted into the program's Hall of Fame. The California Angels selected him in the fifth round of the 1990 MLB draft, but he opted to not sign with them, returning to the draft pool the following season.

Creek also played on the U.S. national under-18 team in 1987 and collegiate national team in 1989. His team finished second at the 1987 World Junior Baseball Championship.

== Professional career ==
=== St. Louis Cardinals ===
==== Minor leagues ====
In 1991, Creek was selected by the St. Louis Cardinals in the seventh round of the draft and signed shortly thereafter. He bounced around A-ball in 1991 and 1992, playing for four teams (Hamilton, Savannah, Springfield, and St. Petersburg) in that span. He was used primarily as a starting pitcher. Despite some early career struggles with Hamilton and Savannah in 1991, Creek's performance improved upon joining Springfield the following season. Creek registered a career low 2.58 ERA as well as a 4–1 win–loss record with Springfield in 1992.

He then continued his strong pitching with St. Petersburg and started each of the 13 games he appeared in, going 5–4 with a 2.82 ERA. After playing in Double-A and compiling a career record of 18–22 with a 4.00 ERA as a Double-A pitcher, Creek had three separate stints playing with the Triple-A Louisville Redbirds. He alternated between Louisville and Double- A Arkansas.

==== Major leagues ====
After a solid showing at both Double-A and Triple-A, the Cardinals promoted Creek. On September 17, 1995, he faced the Los Angeles Dodgers for his first MLB debut. He pitched one hitless inning and struck out two batters. He appeared in five more games for St. Louis, throwing a total of six innings in six games and did not permit any runs to score.

=== San Francisco Giants ===
On December 14, 1995, Creek was dealt to the San Francisco Giants in a multi-player deal that also sent Rich DeLucia and Allen Watson to the Giants. The Cardinals received Royce Clayton and Chris Wimmer.

Creek pitched 48 innings in 1996 and finished the season with a 6.52 ERA in 63 appearances. He also had an 0–2 record. He spent the following season with the Triple-A Phoenix Firebirds. In 25 Triple-A games (18 of them starts), he went 8–6 with two complete games and one shutout. His showing at Triple-A in 1997 earned him a quick promotion back to San Francisco. Creek went 1–2 with a 6.75 ERA and 14 strikeouts with the Giants in 1997.

=== Hanshin Tigers ===
On November 7, 1997, the Chicago White Sox purchased Creek's contract from the Giants. His contract was purchased again less than a month later, on December 4, this time by a team in Japan. The Hanshin Tigers of the Central League bought his contract from Chicago, and he went to play the 1998 season in Japan. For the Tigers, he split the season between the Central League and minor league Western League teams, spending most of the season in the mionrs. In 17 games (16 starts) he went 9–1 with a 2.16 ERA and 101 strikeouts for the Western League's Tigers. In the Central League, however, he went 0–4 with a 5.65 ERA in seven games.

=== Chicago Cubs ===
Creek returned from his one-year stint in Japan by signing a contract with the Chicago Cubs on January 29, 1999. He pitched most of the season with the Triple-A Iowa Cubs. He went 7–3 in 25 games (20 starts) with one save and a 3.79 ERA. He struggled in six major league games, ending the season with a 10.50 ERA.

=== Tampa Bay Devil Rays ===
On February 1, 2000 the Tampa Bay Devil Rays signed Creek to a contract, and Creek would play the next two and a half seasons of his MLB career with the cellar-dwelling Devil Rays. In 2000, he saw action in 45 games (all in relief) as he posted a 1–3 mark with a 4.60 ERA for Tampa Bay. Creek also picked up his only MLB save. The following season Creek lowered his ERA to 4.31 as he pitched in a career-high 66 games and had a won-loss record of 2–5. He also threw a career-high 62 innings.

Creek spent the first four months of the 2002 season with the Devil Rays, where he appeared in 29 games, winning two of them and losing one. His ERA, however, was 6.27. Tampa Bay designated Creek for assignment in July.

=== Seattle Mariners ===
On July 24, 2002, Tampa Bay traded Creek to the Seattle Mariners for cash. Creek played in 23 games for the Mariners going 1–1 with a 4.91 ERA. His 2002 combined totals were 52 games, 3–2 record, 55 innings pitched, and a 5.82 ERA. Seattle released him after the season.

=== Toronto Blue Jays ===
In October 2002, Creek signed with the Toronto Blue Jays. In the 2003 season, he pitched just 13 innings in 21 appearances to go along with his 3.29 ERA for the Jays. His season ended in June as he underwent Tommy John surgery.

=== St. Louis Cardinals ===
Creek signed in February 2004 with the St. Louis Cardinals. He was only used as a reliever in Triple-A, going 2–1 with a 4.71 ERA in 33 games for Memphis.

=== Detroit Tigers ===
The Detroit Tigers signed Creek in January 2005 to add pitching depth to their roster. He played on the Tigers' Triple-A affiliate in Toledo pitching 28 games (one start) as he chalked up a record of 2–2 to go along with an ERA of 4.61. Creek was able to return to the majors and appear in 20 games for the Tigers. He threw 22 innings, finishing the year with a 6.85 ERA.

Creek retired in 2006.

== Personal life and death ==
Creek was married and had two children. Creek's younger brother, Ryan Creek, was also a professional pitcher, playing in the minor leagues from 1993 to 2000.

After retiring, Creek became a licensed boat captain and fishing guide in Florida, competing in fishing tournaments. He also served as a coach at USA Baseball camps and programs.

Creek was diagnosed with pancreatic cancer in April 2024. He died due to complications the disease on July 28 at the age of 55.
