= Allen Watson =

American baseball player (born 1970)

- Pitcher
- Born: November 18, 1970 (age 55); Jamaica, New York, U.S.
- Batted: Left Threw: Left

MLB debut
- July 8, 1993, for the St. Louis Cardinals

Last MLB appearance
- August 10, 2000, for the New York Yankees

MLB statistics
- Win–loss record: 51–55
- Earned run average: 5.03
- Strikeouts: 589
- Stats at Baseball Reference

Teams
- St. Louis Cardinals (1993–1995); San Francisco Giants (1996); Anaheim Angels (1997–1998); New York Mets (1999); Seattle Mariners (1999); New York Yankees (1999–2000)

Career highlights and awards
- World Series champion (1999, 2000)

Allen Kenneth Watson (born November 18, 1970) is an American former professional baseball left-handed pitcher. He played in Major League Baseball for the St. Louis Cardinals, San Francisco Giants, Anaheim Angels, New York Mets, Seattle Mariners, and New York Yankees from 1993 to 2000. With the Yankees, Watson was a member of the 1999 & 2000 World Series champions.

== Amateur career ==
Allen Watson was born in Jamaica, New York on November 18, 1970. He is a graduate of Christ the King Regional High School in Middle Village, New York and attended New York Institute of Technology. In 1990, he played collegiate summer baseball with the Falmouth Commodores of the Cape Cod Baseball League. He was selected as an NCAA Division I All-American by the American Baseball Coaches Association as a designated hitter.

== Professional career ==
=== St. Louis Cardinals ===
The Cardinals selected Watson in the first round of the 1991 Major League Baseball draft. He went 21-15 with a 2.42 earned run average & 326 strikeouts over two plus seasons in the Cardinals' minor league system to earn a call up to the majors. In his major league debut on July 8, 1993, Watson allowed one run over six innings to earn his first major league win. He shut the Montreal Expos out for 7.2 innings on August 14 to improve to 6-0 with a 3.02 ERA before dropping his next seven decisions with a 7.07 ERA to finish the season at 6-7 with a 4.60 ERA.

=== San Francisco Giants ===
Following the 1995 season, the Cardinals traded Watson, Doug Creek, and Rich DeLucia to the San Francisco Giants for Royce Clayton and Chris Wimmer. A ligament strain in his left elbow cost Watson most of the month of July 1996 and limited his effectiveness upon his return (1-4, 5.72 ERA, Giants went 1-10 in his 11 starts).

Following his only season in San Francisco, he was again traded during the off season. He and minor league pitcher Fausto Macey were sent to the Anaheim Angels for Gold Glove first baseman J. T. Snow.

=== Move to the bullpen ===
Watson got off to a rough start with the Angels, going 1-3 with a 6.46 ERA through his first nine starts. He improved from there, going 6-1 with a 3.19 ERA in his next seven starts. He ended the season with a career high twelve wins (to go along with 12 losses), and also set career highs in strikeouts (141) and innings pitched (199), while also leading the majors in home runs allowed (37). On June 14, 1997, Watson gave up the first-ever grand slam in interleague play, to former teammate Rich Aurilia of the San Francisco Giants.

It was during his second season in Anaheim that Watson began seeing more work out of the bullpen. In 14 starts, Watson went 5-7 with a 6.94 ERA. In 14 relief appearances, Watson went 1-0 with an even 3.00 ERA.

Watson signed with the New York Mets for the 1999 season. In his first appearance for the Mets, Watson earned his only career save against the Florida Marlins despite allowing two earned runs in three innings pitched. On June 18, 1999, the Mets traded Watson and cash considerations to the Seattle Mariners for Mac Suzuki and a player to be named later. The Mets immediately placed Suzuki on waivers, while the Mariners released Watson ten days after making the deal.

=== New York Yankees (1999–2000) ===
On July 3, 1999, Watson reunited with his former Cardinals manager, Joe Torre, signing a minor league deal with the New York Yankees. Watson had his best tenure with them, going 4–0 with a 2.10 ERA to finish the 1999 season. His play earned him a spot on the postseason roster, where he pitched one inning in the 1999 American League Championship Series against the Boston Red Sox. Watson gave up two hits, two walks, and one strikeout as the Yankees defeated Boston. Watson did not pitch in the 1999 World Series. On November 5, 1999, he was granted free agency, but he re-signed with the Yankees on December 7.

In 2000, Watson's ERA ballooned to 10.23 and he appeared in only 17 games. He pitched 22 innings and did not record a win or loss, while finishing only 9 games for the team. Despite his dismal performance during the season, he was placed on the Yankees' postseason roster, but did not appear in any games. He won his second World Series when the Yankees defeated the Mets in five games. Watson later had surgery to repair his shoulder, which caused him to miss the entire 2001 season. Watson returned to the Yankees during spring training in 2002, but made only one start. He retired after spring training.

== Post-baseball career ==
Watson is currently working as a personal pitching coach for prospective athletes in Queens and Long Island. He works primarily out of The Cage located on Metropolitan Avenue in Ridgewood. Watson also runs baseball clinics for all ages in Oceanside, New York at South Shore Sports Complex and at East Coast Sports Academy.

On December 20, 2007, Watson was named in Jason Grimsley's affidavit as having used performance-enhancing drugs. Watson and Grimsley were teammates on the 1999-2000 New York Yankees. In a statement released by his agent, Watson denied these accusations by stating:

I at no time over my professional baseball career used steroids or any performance-enhancing drugs. Not then, not now, not ever.

== Bagel incident ==
In their baseball memoir The Yankee Years, Joe Torre and Tom Verducci recount an incident where Watson was horsing around in the Yankee clubhouse and threw a bagel towards a clubhouse attendant, just as Yankee owner George Steinbrenner walked in. When the bagel hit Steinbrenner, he demanded to know who threw it. When Watson confessed, Steinbrenner remarked "I figured it was you, Watson. That's why it didn't hurt."
