= 1999 Arizona Diamondbacks season =

1999 Arizona Diamondbacks
- National League West champions
- League: National League
- Division: West
- Ballpark: Bank One Ballpark
- City: Phoenix, Arizona
- Record: 100–62 (.617)
- Divisional place: 1st
- Owners: Jerry Colangelo
- General managers: Joe Garagiola Jr.
- Managers: Buck Showalter
- Television: FSN Arizona; KTVK (3TV) (Thom Brennaman, Greg Schulte, Bob Brenly, Joe Garagiola)
- Radio: KTAR (620 AM) (Thom Brennaman, Rod Allen, Greg Schulte); KSUN (Spanish) (Jose Tolentino, Ivan Lara)
- Stats: ESPN.com; Baseball Reference

The 1999 Arizona Diamondbacks season was the franchise's second season in Major League Baseball and their second season at Bank One Ballpark and in Phoenix, Arizona. They began the season on April 5 at home against the Los Angeles Dodgers, and looked to improve on their 1998 expansion season. They looked to contend in what was a strong National League West. They finished the season with a highly surprising record of 100-62, good enough for the NL West title, becoming the fastest expansion team in MLB history to reach the playoffs. They also set all-time franchise highs in hits (1,566), runs (908), batting average (.277), on-base percentage (.347), and slugging percentage (.459). In the NLDS, however, they fell in four games to the New York Mets on Todd Pratt's infamous home run. Randy Johnson would win the NL Cy Young Award and become the third pitcher to win the Cy Young Award in both leagues.

== Offseason ==
- October 26, 1998: Izzy Molina was signed as a free agent with the Arizona Diamondbacks.
- November 10, 1998: Dante Powell was traded by the San Francisco Giants to the Arizona Diamondbacks for Alan Embree.
- November 13, 1998: Greg Swindell signed as a free agent with the Arizona Diamondbacks.
- December 2, 1998: Ernie Young was signed as a free agent with the Arizona Diamondbacks.
- December 10, 1998: Randy Johnson signed as a free agent with the Arizona Diamondbacks.
- January 22, 1999: Ken Huckaby was signed as a free agent with the Arizona Diamondbacks.
- February 18, 1999: Dale Sveum was signed as a free agent with the Arizona Diamondbacks.
- March 30, 1999: Izzy Molina was traded by the Arizona Diamondbacks with Ben Ford to the New York Yankees for Darren Holmes and cash.
- March 30, 1999: Aaron Small was released by the Arizona Diamondbacks.

== Regular season ==
- In his first season with the club, Randy Johnson helped the second-year franchise win the NL West title. He joined Gaylord Perry and Pedro Martínez as one of only three pitchers to win Cy Young Awards in both leagues. Johnson led the NL with a 2.48 ERA and led both leagues with 364 strikeouts, 12 complete games and 271 2/3 innings pitched.

=== Opening Day starters ===
- Tony Batista
- Jay Bell
- Andy Benes
- Steve Finley
- Luis Gonzalez
- Travis Lee
- Damian Miller
- Matt Williams
- Tony Womack

=== Notable transactions ===
- May 9, 1999: Dale Sveum was released by the Arizona Diamondbacks.
- June 2, 1999: Lyle Overbay was drafted by the Arizona Diamondbacks in the 18th round of the 1999 amateur draft. Player signed June 8, 1999.
- June 12, 1999: Dan Plesac was traded by the Toronto Blue Jays to the Arizona Diamondbacks for Tony Batista and John Frascatore.

=== Season standings ===
NL West
Team	W	L	Pct.	GB	Home	Road
Arizona Diamondbacks	100	62	.617	—	52‍–‍29	48‍–‍33
San Francisco Giants	86	76	.531	14	49‍–‍32	37‍–‍44
Los Angeles Dodgers	77	85	.475	23	37‍–‍44	40‍–‍41
San Diego Padres	74	88	.457	26	46‍–‍35	28‍–‍53
Colorado Rockies	72	90	.444	28	39‍–‍42	33‍–‍48

=== Record vs. opponents ===
1999 National League record Source: MLB Standings Grid – 1999
Team	AZ	ATL	CHC	CIN	COL	FLA	HOU	LAD	MIL	MON	NYM	PHI	PIT	SD	SF	STL	AL
Arizona	—	4–5	7–2	1–8	6–7	8–1	5–4	7–6	5–4	6–3	7–2	8–1	5–2	11–2	9–3	4–4	7–8
Atlanta	5–4	—	2–5	8–1	5–4	9–4	6–1	5–4	5–2	9–4	9–3	8–5	6–3	5–4	4–5	8–1	9–9
Chicago	2–7	5–2	—	5–8	4–5	6–3	3–9	2–7	6–6	2–5	3–6	2–7	7–6	6–3	1–7	7–5	6–9
Cincinnati	8–1	1–8	8–5	—	7–2	6–1	9–4	4–3	6–6	4–3	5–5	6–3	7–6	6–3	4–5	8–4	7–8
Colorado	7–6	4–5	5–4	2–7	—	5–4	2–6	8–5	6–3	6–3	4–5	5–4	2–7	4–9	4–9	4–5	4–8
Florida	1–8	4–9	3–6	1–6	4–5	—	2–7	7–2	5–4	8–4	3–10	2–11	3–4	3–6	4–5	3–4	11–7
Houston	4–5	1–6	9–3	4–9	6–2	7–2	—	6–3	8–5	7–2	4–5	6–1	5–7	8–1	5–4	5–7	12–3
Los Angeles	6–7	4–5	7–2	3–4	5–8	2–7	3–6	—	7–2	5–4	4–4	6–3	3–6	3–9	8–5	3–6	8–7
Milwaukee	4–5	2–5	6–6	6–6	3–6	4–5	5–8	2–7	—	5–4	2–5	5–4	8–4	3–5	4–5	7–6	8–6
Montreal	3–6	4–9	5–2	3–4	3–6	4–8	2–7	4–5	4–5	—	5–8	6–6	3–6	5–3	4–5	5–4	8–10
New York	2–7	3–9	6–3	5–5	5–4	10–3	5–4	4–4	5–2	8–5	—	6–6	7–2	7–2	7–2	5–2	12–6
Philadelphia	1–8	5–8	7–2	3–6	4–5	11–2	1–6	3–6	4–5	6–6	6–6	—	3–4	6–3	2–6	4–5	11–7
Pittsburgh	2–5	3–6	6–7	6–7	7–2	4–3	7–5	6–3	4–8	6–3	2–7	4–3	—	3–6	4–5	7–5	7–8
San Diego	2–11	4–5	3–6	3–6	9–4	6–3	1–8	9–3	5–3	3–5	2–7	3–6	6–3	—	5–7	2–7	11–4
San Francisco	3–9	5–4	7–1	5–4	9–4	5–4	4–5	5–8	5–4	5–4	2–7	6–2	5–4	7–5	—	6–3	7–8
St. Louis	4–4	1–8	5–7	4–8	5–4	4–3	7–5	6–3	6–7	4–5	2–5	5–4	5–7	7–2	3–6	—	7–8

=== Game log ===
Legend
Diamondbacks Win	Diamondbacks Loss	Game postponed

1999 Regular Season Game Log (100–62) (Home: 52–29; Road: 48–33)
April (13–11) (Home: 0–0; Road: 0–0)

#	Date	Opponent	Score	Win	Loss	Save	Stadium	Attendance	Record	Report
1	April 5	@ Dodgers	6–8 (11/wo)	Shaw (1-0)	Frascatore (0-1)	None	Dodger Stadium	53,109	0–1	
2	April 6	@ Dodgers	2–3 (10/wo)	Mills (1-0)	Anderson (0-1)	None	Dodger Stadium	33,139	0–2	
3	April 7	@ Dodgers	4–6	Valdez (1-0)	Benes (0-1)	Shaw (1)	Dodger Stadium	29,042	0–3	
4	April 9	@ Braves	2–3 (10/wo)	Rocker (1-0)	Frascatore (0-2)	None	Turner Field	34,939	0–4	
5	April 10	@ Braves	8–3	Johnson (1-0)	Glavine (0-2)	None	Turner Field	44,531	1–4	
6	April 11	@ Braves	2–3 (wo)	McGlinchy (1-0)	Olson (0-1)	None	Turner Field	32,454	1–5	
7	April 12	Dodgers	12–6	Benes (1-1)	Park (0-1)	None	Bank One Ballpark	46,929	2–5	
8	April 13	Dodgers	7–6 (16/wo)	Chouinard (1-0)	Mlicki (0-1)	None	Bank One Ballpark	31,197	3–5	
9	April 14	Dodgers	6–2	Daal (1-0)	Perez (0-2)	None	Bank One Ballpark	30,561	4–5	
10	April 15	Dodgers	1–8	Dreifort (2-0)	Johnson (1-1)	None	Bank One Ballpark	36,105	4–6	
11	April 16	Giants	10–4	Stottlemyre (1-0)	Gardner	Anderson (1)	Bank One Ballpark	34,516	5–6	
12	April 17	Giants	5–8	Rueter (1-0)	Benes (1-2)	None	Bank One Ballpark	36,674	5–7	
13	April 18	Giants	12–3	Reynoso (1-0)	Ortiz (1-2)	None	Bank One Ballpark	36,043	6–7	
14	April 19	Phillies	3–2	Daal (2-0)	Perez (0-1)	Swindell (1)	Bank One Ballpark	29,704	7–7	
15	April 20	Phillies	8–1	Johnson (2-1)	Spoljaric (0-2)	None	Bank One Ballpark	30,546	8–7	
16	April 21	Phillies	4–2	Stottlemyre (2-0)	Schilling (3-1)	Olson (1)	Bank One Ballpark	31,421	9–7	
17	April 23	@ Padres	10–6	Benes (2-2)	Hitchcock (1-1)	None	Qualcomm Stadium	20,437	10–7	
18	April 24	@ Padres	2–7	Williams (1-0)	Daal (2-1)	None	Qualcomm Stadium	61,674	10–8	
19	April 25	@ Padres	5–3 (11)	Swindell (1-0)	Miceli (1-1)	Olson (2)	Qualcomm Stadium	26,684	11–8	
20	April 26	@ Astros	2–5	Lima (3-1)	Stottlemyre (2-1)	Wagner (6)	Astrodome	18,328	11–9	
21	April 27	@ Astros	0–11	Reynolds (4-1)	Reynoso (1-1)	None	Astrodome	19,396	11–10	
22	April 28	@ Astros	10–6	Holmes (1-0)	Wagner (1-1)	None	Astrodome	19,605	12–10	
23	April 29	@ Astros	2–5	Hampton (2-1)	Daal (2-2)	Wagner (7)	Astrodome	21,506	12–11	
24	April 30	@ Brewers	3–2	Holmes (2-0)	Myers (1-1)	Olson (3)	Milwaukee County Stadium	17,008	13–11	

May (18–10) (Home: 0–0; Road: 0–0)

#	Date	Opponent	Score	Win	Loss	Save	Stadium	Attendance	Record	Report
25	May 1	@ Brewers	5–3	Stottlemyre (3-1)	Abbott (0-4)	Olson (4)	Milwaukee County Stadium	28,415	14–11	
26	May 2	@ Brewers	5–6	Weathers (2-0)	Holmes (2-1)	None	Milwaukee County Stadium	13,943	14–13	
27	May 3	@ Reds	3–4 (wo)	Williamson (2-1)	Olson (0-2)	Wickman (4)	Cinergy Field	23,811	14–12	
28	May 4	@ Reds	4–6	Reyes (1-0)	Daal (2-3)	Graves (4)	Cinergy Field	14,660	14–14	
29	May 5	@ Reds	5–1	Johnson (3-1)	Avery (1-3)	None	Cinergy Field	16,247	15–14	
30	May 7	Mets	14–7	Stottlemyre (4-1)	Hershiser (2-3)	None	Bank One Ballpark	38,154	16–14	
31	May 8	Mets	2–4	Yoshii (2-3)	Benes (2-3)	Benitez (1)	Bank One Ballpark	37,593	16–15	
32	May 9	Mets	11–6	Daal (3-3)	Reed (2-1)	None	Bank One Ballpark	38,250	17–15	
33	May 10	Expos	7–6 (wo)	Olson (1-2)	Ayala (0-3)	None	Bank One Ballpark	31,208	18–15	
34	May 11	Expos	4–3 (10/wo)	Olson (2-2)	Mota (0-1)	None	Bank One Ballpark	28,103	19–15	
35	May 12	Expos	8–6 (wo)	Telemaco (1-0)	Smart (0-1)	None	Bank One Ballpark	30,753	20–15	
36	May 14	Rockies	1–4	Bohanon (6-1)	Benes (2-4)	None	Bank One Ballpark	38,894	20–16	
37	May 15	Rockies	9–2	Johnson (4-1)	Kile (2-3)	None	Bank One Ballpark	40,853	21–16	
38	May 16	Rockies	1–5	Astacio (4-3)	Daal (3-4)	None	Bank One Ballpark	38,869	21–17	
39	May 17	@ Giants	12–1	Frascatore (1-2)	Estes (2-3)	None	3Com Park	10,846	22–17	
40	May 18	@ Giants	7–3	Reynoso (2-1)	Brock (4-3)	None	3Com Park	10,900	23–17	
41	May 19	@ Giants	3–8	Rueter (3-2)	Benes (2-5)	None	3Com Park	15,793	23–18	
42	May 20	@ Rockies	4–8	Kile (3-3)	Johnson (4-2)	None	Coors Field	40,021	23–19	
43	May 21	@ Rockies	7–8 (11/wo)	Leskanic (1-1)	Frascatore (1-3)	None	Coors Field	44,205	23–20	
44	May 22	@ Rockies	8–3	Daal (4-4)	Jones (1-3)	None	Coors Field	48,594	24–20	
45	May 23	@ Rockies	6–7 (wo)	McElroy (2-0)	Olson (2-3)	None	Coors Field	46,299	24–21	
46	May 24	Padres	6–5	Benes (3-5)	Ashby (5-3)	Olson (5)	Bank One Ballpark	34,745	25–21	
47	May 25	Padres	4–0	Johnson (5-2)	Hitchcock (3-4)	None	Bank One Ballpark	34,273	26–21	
48	May 26	Padres	3–2 (11/wo)	Olson (3-3)	Miceli (2-2)	None	Bank One Ballpark	33,048	27–21	
49	May 28	@ Mets	2–1	Daal (5-4)	Reed (3-2)	Olson (6)	Shea Stadium	32,114	28–21	
50	May 29	@ Mets	8–7	Reynoso (3-3)	Beltran (1-1)	Kim (1)	Shea Stadium	35,167	29–21	
51	May 30	@ Mets	10–1	Johnson (6-2)	Yoshii (5-4)	None	Shea Stadium	38,302	30–21	
52	May 30	@ Expos	8–5 (10)	Holmes (3-1)	Kline (1-2)	Olson (7)	Olympic Stadium	5,048	31–21	

June (12–14) (Home: 0–0; Road: 0–0)

#	Date	Opponent	Score	Win	Loss	Save	Stadium	Attendance	Record	Report
53	June 1	@ Expos	8–10	Mota (1-1)	Frascatore (1-4)	Urbina (12)	Olympic Stadium	5,188	31–22	
54	June 2	@ Expos	15–2	Daal (6-4)	Vazquez (2-4)	None	Olympic Stadium	5,395	32–22	
55	June 4	Rangers	11–3	Johnson (7-2)	Clark (3-4)	None	Bank One Ballpark	41,029	33–22	
56	June 5	Rangers	8–9	Venafro (2-0)	Holmes (3-2)	Wetteland (19)	Bank One Ballpark	41,820	33–23	
57	June 6	Rangers	4–2	Benes (4-5)	Helling (5-6)	Olson (8)	Bank One Ballpark	34,353	34–23	
58	June 7	Cubs	6–7	Adams (2-1)	Holmes (3-3)	None	Bank One Ballpark	44,083	34–24	
59	June 8	Cubs	3–5	Aguilera (6-2)	Olson (3-4)	Adams (3)	Bank One Ballpark	39,308	34–25	
60	June 9	Cubs	8–7	Johnson (8-2)	Mulholland (3-2)	Nunez (1)	Bank One Ballpark	46,033	35–25	
61	June 11	@ Angels	12–2	Reynoso (4-1)	Hill (3-5)	None	Edison International Field	37,042	36–25	
62	June 12	@ Angels	3–4	Petkovsek (5-1)	Benes (4-6)	Percival (18)	Edison International Field	37,916	36–26	
63	June 13	@ Angels	3–1 (13)	Nunez (1-0)	Petkovsek (5-2)	Olson (9)	Edison International Field	29,176	37–26	
64	June 14	Marlins	2–0	Johnson (9-2)	Dempster (3-2)	Olson (10)	Bank One Ballpark	39,314	38–26	
65	June 15	Marlins	4–3	Anderson (1-1)	Springer (2-8)	Olson (11)	Bank One Ballpark	30,096	39–26	
66	June 16	Marlins	12–6	Reynoso (5-1)	Meadows (5-7)	None	Bank One Ballpark	30,567	40–26	
67	June 18	Braves	0–6	Smoltz (8-2)	Benes (4-7)	None	Bank One Ballpark	41,499	40–27	
68	June 19	Braves	7–3	Daal (7-4)	Perez (4-4)	None	Bank One Ballpark	46,726	41–27	
69	June 20	Braves	4–10	Glavine (5-7)	Johnson (9-3)	None	Bank One Ballpark	44,083	41–28	
70	June 21	Reds	4–7 (10)	White (1-2)	Nunez (1-1)	Graves (8)	Bank One Ballpark	32,400	41–29	
71	June 22	Reds	7–8	Reyes (2-1)	Vosberg (0-1)	Graves (9)	Bank One Ballpark	30,420	41–30	
72	June 23	Reds	7–9	Avery (5-6)	Benes (4-8)	Williamson (8)	Bank One Ballpark	31,648	41–31	
73	June 24	Cardinals	8–7 (wo)	Nunez (2-1)	Bottalico (1-4)	None	Bank One Ballpark	41,459	42–31	
74	June 25	Cardinals	0–1	Jimenez (4-7)	Johnson (9-4)	None	Bank One Ballpark	45,540	42–32	
75	June 26	Cardinals	1–2 (10)	Aybar (4-1)	Nunez (2-2)	None	Bank One Ballpark	48,053	42–33	
76	June 27	Cardinals	3–2 (10/wo)	Nunez (3-2)	Bottalico (1-5)	None	Bank One Ballpark	44,458	43–33	
77	June 29	@ Reds	4–5 (wo)	Graves (5-3)	Padilla (0-1)	None	Cinergy Field	24,672	43–34	
78	June 30	@ Reds	0–2	Villone (3-2)	Johnson (9-5)	Williamson (10)	Cinergy Field	29,560	43–35	

July (16–11) (Home: 0–0; Road: 0–0)

#	Date	Opponent	Score	Win	Loss	Save	Stadium	Attendance	Record	Report
79	July 1	@ Reds	1–2 (10/wo)	Williamson (7-2)	Plesac (0-4)	None	Cinergy Field	18,394	43–36	
80	July 2	@ Cardinals	9–5	Anderson (2-1)	Oliver (4-6)	None	Busch Memorial Stadium	39,693	44–36	
81	July 3	@ Cardinals	1–2 (10/wo)	Painter (1-4)	Kim (0-1)	None	Busch Memorial Stadium	41,278	44–37	
82	July 4	@ Cardinals	17–5	Benes (5-8)	Croushore (1-2)	None	Busch Memorial Stadium	38,041	45–37	
83	July 5	@ Cardinals	0–1	Jimenez (5-8)	Johnson (9-6)	None	Busch Memorial Stadium	33,700	45–38	
84	July 6	Astros	1–3	Lima (12-4)	Daal (7-5)	None	Bank One Ballpark	31,672	45–39	
85	July 7	Astros	13–7	Chouinard (2-0)	Miller (0-1)	None	Bank One Ballpark	31,004	46–39	
86	July 8	Astros	8–7 (11/wo)	Olson (4-4)	Williams (0-1)	None	Bank One Ballpark	33,700	47–39	
87	July 9	Athletics	2–5	Heredia (5-5)	Benes (5-9)	Taylor (21)	Bank One Ballpark	33,635	47–40	
88	July 10	Athletics	0–2	Hudson (5-1)	Johnson (9-7)	Taylor (22)	Bank One Ballpark	36,042	47–41	
89	July 11	Athletics	7–4	Daal (8-5)	Haynes (6-7)	Mantei (11)	Bank One Ballpark	36,632	48–41	
90	July 15	@ Rangers	2–3 (wo)	Venafro (3-1)	Mantei (1-3)	None	The Ballpark in Arlington	33,328	48–42	
91	July 16	@ Rangers	8–9 (wo)	Wetteland (3-3)	Chouinard (2-1)	None	The Ballpark in Arlington	38,802	48–43	
92	July 17	@ Rangers	8–6 (10)	Plesac (1-4)	Wetteland (3-4)	Mantei (12)	The Ballpark in Arlington	34,421	49–43	
93	July 18	@ Mariners	7–8 (10/wo)	Mesa (1-4)	Kim (0-2)	None	Safeco Field	44,705	49–44	
94	July 19	@ Mariners	5–7	Meche (1-0)	Anderson (2-2)	None	Safeco Field	44,287	49–45	
95	July 20	@ Mariners	6–0	Johnson (10-7)	Marte (0-1)	None	Safeco Field	44,884	50–45	
96	July 21	@ Astros	7–4	Chouinard (3-1)	Powell (4-2)	Mantei (13)	Astrodome	23,985	51–45	
97	July 22	@ Astros	2–1	Benes (6-9)	Lima (13-5)	Mantei (14)	Astrodome	31,861	52–45	
98	July 23	Dodgers	10–1	Daal (9-5)	Perez (2-10)	None	Bank One Ballpark	43,031	53–45	
99	July 24	Dodgers	3–0	Anderson (3-2)	Dreifort (8-9)	Mantei (15)	Bank One Ballpark	42,824	54–45	
100	July 25	Dodgers	1–2	Brown (11-6)	Johnson (10-8)	Shaw (21)	Bank One Ballpark	31,861	54–46	
101	July 26	@ Padres	2–0	Reynoso (6-1)	Hitchcock (9-8)	Mantei (16)	Qualcomm Stadium	20,042	55–46	
102	July 27	@ Padres	4–3	Olson (5-4)	Reyes (2-2)	Mantei (17)	Qualcomm Stadium	29,224	56–46	
103	July 28	@ Padres	7–4	Daal (10-5)	Boehringer (6-3)	Plesac (1)	Qualcomm Stadium	28,806	57–46	
104	July 30	@ Dodgers	6–5	Chouinard (4-1)	Shaw (2-4)	Mantei (18)	Dodger Stadium	45,839	58–46	
105	July 31	@ Dodgers	4–2	Johnson (11-8)	Valdez (8-9)	None	Dodger Stadium	37,114	59–46	

August (20–8) (Home: 0–0; Road: 0–0)

#	Date	Opponent	Score	Win	Loss	Save	Stadium	Attendance	Record	Report
106	August 1	@ Dodgers	2–4	Masaoka (2-2)	Benes (6-10)	Shaw (22)	Dodger Stadium	46,991	59–47	
107	August 2	Giants	16–6	Reynoso (7-1)	Rueter (9-6)	None	Bank One Ballpark	40,470	60–47	
108	August 3	Giants	1–3	Hernandez (6-10)	Daal (10-6)	Nen (24)	Bank One Ballpark	38,794	60–48	
109	August 4	Giants	8–4	Anderson (4-2)	Nathan (2-2)	None	Bank One Ballpark	41,503	61–48	
110	August 6	@ Phillies	2–4 (11/wo)	Gomes (3-1)	Chouinard (4-2)	None	Veterans Stadium	27,742	61–49	
111	August 7	@ Phillies	8–2	Benes (7-10)	Schilling (14-5)	Shaw (22)	Veterans Stadium	18,766	62–49	
112	August 8	@ Phillies	7–4	Reynoso (8-1)	Ogea (6-10)	Mantei (19)	Veterans Stadium	32,047	63–49	
113	August 9	@ Cubs	10–7	Daal (11-6)	Sanders (4-6)	None	Wrigley Field	38,679	64–49	
114	August 10	@ Cubs	3–1	Swindell (2-0)	Lieber (8-6)	Olson (12)	Wrigley Field	32,787	65–49	
115	August 11	@ Cubs	7–5 (11)	Plesac (2-4)	Rain (0-1)	Olson (13)	Wrigley Field	39,334	66–49	
116	August 13	Brewers	1–3	Nomo (10-5)	Benes (7-11)	Wickman (23)	Bank One Ballpark	38,415	66–50	
117	August 14	Brewers	2–4	Karl (8-10)	Reynoso (8-2)	Wickman (24)	Bank One Ballpark	40,937	66–51	
118	August 15	Brewers	4–0	Daal (12-6)	Pulsipher (3-3)	None	Bank One Ballpark	32,869	67–51	
119	August 16	Cubs	10–3	Johnson (12-8)	Lieber (8-7)	None	Bank One Ballpark	42,225	68–51	
120	August 17	Cubs	4–0	Anderson (5-2)	Lorraine (1-1)	None	Bank One Ballpark	39,403	69–51	
121	August 18	Cubs	3–1	Benes (8-11)	Tapani (6-11)	Mantei (20)	Bank One Ballpark	41,571	70–51	
122	August 20	@ Pirates	4–5	Ritchie (12-8)	Stottlemyre (4-2)	Williams (20)	Three Rivers Stadium	23,934	70–52	
123	August 21	@ Pirates	4–2	Johnson (13-8)	Anderson (1-1)	None	Three Rivers Stadium	31,364	71–52	
124	August 22	@ Pirates	7–5	Daal (13-6)	Schmidt (10-9)	Mantei (21)	Three Rivers Stadium	25,112	72–52	
125	August 23	@ Pirates	2–1	Reynoso (9-2)	Cordova (8-6)	Mantei (22)	Three Rivers Stadium	11,768	73–52	
126	August 24	@ Marlins	5–4	Benes (9-11)	Almanza (0-1)	Mantei (23)	Pro Player Stadium	13,689	74–52	
127	August 25	@ Marlins	7–2	Stottlemyre (5-2)	Nunez (5-6)	None	Pro Player Stadium	14,409	75–52	
128	August 26	@ Marlins	12–2	Johnson (14-8)	Meadows (10-13)	None	Pro Player Stadium	13,521	76–52	
129	August 27	Mets	3–6	Dotel (5-1)	Daal (13-7)	Benitez (16)	Bank One Ballpark	42,581	76–53	
130	August 28	Mets	7–2	Reynoso (10-2)	Cook (10-4)	Mantei (24)	Bank One Ballpark	47,076	77–53	
131	August 29	Mets	8–4	Anderson (6-2)	Leiter (10-9)	Olson (14)	Bank One Ballpark	38,596	78–53	
132	August 30	Expos	5–4	Chouinard (5-2)	Batista (7-7)	Mantei (25)	Bank One Ballpark	30,483	79–53	
133	August 31	Expos	1–2	Thurman (6-10)	Johnson (14-9)	Urbina (33)	Bank One Ballpark	32,154	79–54	

September (19–7) (Home: 0–0; Road: 0–0)

#	Date	Opponent	Score	Win	Loss	Save	Stadium	Attendance	Record	Report
134	September 1	Expos	1–8				Bank One Ballpark	28,845	79–55	
135	September 3	@ Braves	3–7				Turner Field	38,389	79–56	
136	September 4	@ Braves	5–4				Turner Field	48,730	80–56	
137	September 5	@ Braves	7–5				Turner Field	44,549	81–56	
138	September 7	@ Brewers	11–9				Milwaukee County Stadium	14,204	82–56	
139	September 8	@ Brewers	9–1				Milwaukee County Stadium	14,393	83–56	
140	September 9	@ Brewers	8–9				Milwaukee County Stadium	10,856	83–57	
141	September 10	Phillies	3–1				Bank One Ballpark	34,700	84–57	
142	September 11	Phillies	4–0				Bank One Ballpark	42,442	85–57	
143	September 12	Phillies	5–0				Bank One Ballpark	32,468	86–57	
144	September 13	Pirates	5–1				Bank One Ballpark	32,147	87–57	
145	September 14	Pirates	2–1				Bank One Ballpark	30,372	88–57	
146	September 15	Pirates	1–5				Bank One Ballpark	31,294	88–58	
147	September 17	Marlins	6–10				Bank One Ballpark	34,127	88–59	
148	September 18	Marlins	8–6 (10/wo)				Bank One Ballpark	40,903	89–59	
149	September 19	Marlins	8–7 (wo)				Bank One Ballpark	34,752	90–59	
150	September 20	@ Rockies	7-12				Coors Field	41,174	90–60	
151	September 21	@ Rockies	7–6				Coors Field	41,559	91–60	
152	September 22	@ Rockies	11–3				Coors Field	40,115	92–60	
153	September 24	@ Giants	11–3				Candlestick Park	48,149	93–60	
154	September 25	@ Giants	7–3				Candlestick Park	40,096	94–60	
155	September 26	@ Giants	7–1				Candlestick Park	40,567	95–60	
156	September 27	Rockies	10–3				Bank One Ballpark	35,360	96–60	
157	September 28	Rockies	9–3				Bank One Ballpark	31,447	97–60	
158	September 29	Rockies	1–4				Bank One Ballpark	32,505	97–61	
159	September 30	Padres	5–3				Bank One Ballpark	33,949	98–61	

October (2–1) (Home: 0–0; Road: 0–0)

#	Date	Opponent	Score	Win	Loss	Save	Stadium	Attendance	Record	Report
160	October 1	Padres	1–6				Bank One Ballpark	38,519	98–62	
161	October 2	Padres	7–5				Bank One Ballpark	46,794	99–62	
162	October 3	Padres	10–3				Bank One Ballpark	43,465	100–62	

=== Roster ===
1999 Arizona Diamondbacks
Roster
Pitchers: 34 Brian Anderson; 40 Andy Benes; 43 Dan Carlson; 41 Bobby Chouinard; 37 Omar Daal; 50 John Frascatore; 46 Darren Holmes; 51 Randy Johnson; 49 Byung-hyun Kim; 31 Matt Mantei; 48 Vladimir Núñez; 30 Gregg Olson; 45 Vicente Padilla; 19 Dan Plesac; 27 Armando Reynoso; 56 Erik Sabel; 32 Todd Stottlemyre; 22 Greg Swindell; 44 Amaury Telemaco; 50 Ed Vosberg	Catchers: 48 Rod Barajas; 26 Damian Miller; 35 Kelly Stinnett; Infielders: 10 Tony Batista; 33 Jay Bell; 28 Greg Colbrunn; 59 Edwin Díaz; 44 Erubiel Durazo; 6 Andy Fox; 2 Hanley Frias; 29 Lenny Harris; 16 Travis Lee; 9 Matt Williams	Outfielders: 25 David Dellucci; 12 Steve Finley; 23 Bernard Gilkey; 20 Luis Gonzalez; 4 Dante Powell; 65 Rob Ryan; 10 Turner Ward; 5 Tony Womack; 47 Ernie Young; Other batters: 7 Danny Klassen	Manager: 11 Buck Showalter; Coaches: 55 Brian Butterfield (3rd Base); 52 Mark Connor (Pitching); 21 Dwayne Murphy (1st Base); 17 Jim Presley (Hitting); 53 Glenn Sherlock (Bullpen); 14 Carlos Tosca (Bench)

== Player stats ==
=== Batting ===
Note: Pos = Position; G = Games played; AB = At bats; H = Hits; HR = Home runs; RBI = Runs batted in; Avg. = Batting average;

Pos	Player	G	AB	H	HR	RBI	Avg.
C	Damian Miller	86	296	80	11	47	.270
1B	Travis Lee	120	375	89	9	50	.237
2B	Jay Bell	151	589	170	38	112	.289
3B	Matt Williams	154	627	190	35	142	.303
SS	Andy Fox	99	274	70	6	33	.255
LF	Luis Gonzalez	153	614	206	26	111	.336
CF	Steve Finley	156	590	156	34	103	.264
RF	Tony Womack	144	614	170	4	41	.277

==== Other batters ====
Note: G = Games played; AB = At bats; H = Hits; HR = Home runs; RBI = Runs batted in; Avg. = Batting average

Player	G	AB	H	HR	RBI	Avg.
Kelly Stinnett	88	284	66	14	38	.232
Bernard Gilkey	94	204	60	8	39	.294
Erubiel Durazo	52	155	51	11	30	.329
Hanley Frias	69	150	41	1	16	.273
Tony Batista	44	144	37	5	21	.257
Greg Colbrunn	67	135	44	5	24	.326
David Dellucci	63	109	43	1	15	.394
Rod Ryan	20	29	7	2	5	.241
Lenny Harris	19	29	11	1	7	.379
Dante Powell	22	25	4	0	1	.160
Turner Ward	10	23	8	2	7	.348
Rod Barajas	5	16	4	1	3	.250
Ernie Young	6	11	2	0	0	.182
Edwin Díaz	4	5	2	0	1	.400
Danny Klassen	1	1	1	0	0	1.000

=== Starting pitchers ===
Note: G = Games pitched; IP = Innings pitched; W = Wins; L = Losses; ERA = Earned run average; SO = Strikeouts

Player	G	IP	W	L	ERA	SO
Randy Johnson	35	271.2	17	9	2.48	364
Omar Daal	32	214.2	16	9	3.65	148
Andy Benes	33	198.1	13	12	4.81	141
Armando Reynoso	31	167.0	10	6	4.37	79
Todd Stottlemyre	17	101.1	6	3	4.09	74

==== Other pitchers ====
Note: G = Games pitched; IP = Innings pitched; W = Wins; L = Losses; ERA = Earned run average; SO = Strikeouts

Player	G	IP	W	L	ERA	SO
Brian Anderson	31	130.0	8	2	4.57	75

===== Relief pitchers =====
Note: G = Games pitched; IP = Innings pitched; W = Wins; L = Losses; SV = Saves; ERA = Earned run average; SO = Strikeouts

Player	G	IP	W	L	SV	ERA	SO
Matt Mantei	30	29.0	0	1	22	2.79	49
Greg Swindell	63	64.2	4	0	1	2.51	51
Gregg Olson	61	60.2	9	4	14	3.71	45
Darren Holmes	44	48.2	4	3	0	3.70	35
Dan Plesac	34	21.2	2	1	1	3.32	27
Bobby Chouinard	32	40.1	5	2	1	2.68	23
Vladimir Núñez	27	34.0	3	2	1	2.91	28
John Frascatore	26	33.0	1	4	0	4.09	15
Byung-Hyun Kim	25	27.1	1	2	1	4.61	31
Erik Sabel	7	9.2	0	0	0	6.52	6
Amaury Telemaco	5	6.0	1	0	0	7.50	2
Vicente Padilla	5	2.2	0	1	0	16.88	0
Ed Vosberg	4	2.2	0	1	0	3.38	2
Dan Carlson	2	4.0	0	0	0	9.00	3

== NLDS ==
New York wins series, 3-1

Game	Score	Date
1	New York 8, Arizona 4	October 5
2	Arizona 7, New York 1	October 6
3	New York 9, Arizona 2	October 8
4	New York 4, Arizona 3 (10 innings)	October 9

== Farm system ==
Level	Team	League	Manager
AAA	Tucson Sidewinders	Pacific Coast League	Chris Speier
AA	El Paso Diablos	Texas League	Don Wakamatsu
A	High Desert Mavericks	California League	Derek Bryant
A	South Bend Silver Hawks	Midwest League	Mike Brumley
Rookie	AZL Diamondbacks	Arizona League	Roly de Armas
Rookie	Missoula Osprey	Pioneer League	Joe Almaraz

LEAGUE CHAMPIONS: Missoula
