= 1999 Milwaukee Brewers season =

1999 Milwaukee Brewers
- League: National League
- Division: Central
- Ballpark: Milwaukee County Stadium
- City: Milwaukee, Wisconsin, United States
- Record: 74–87 (.460)
- Divisional place: 5th
- Owners: Bud Selig
- General managers: Sal Bando, Dean Taylor
- Managers: Phil Garner, Jim Lefebvre
- Television: WCGV-TV; Midwest SC (Matt Vasgersian, Len Kasper, Bill Schroeder)
- Radio: WTMJ (AM) (Bob Uecker, Jim Powell, Len Kasper)

The 1999 Milwaukee Brewers season was the 30th season for the Brewers in Milwaukee, their 2nd in the National League, and their 31st overall. The Brewers finished fifth in the National League Central with a record of 74 wins and 87 losses, failing to improve by one game from the season prior and were eliminated from postseason contention for the 17th consecutive season.

== Offseason ==
- November 11, 1998: Bob Hamelin was released by the Brewers.
- November 20, 1998: Héctor Ramírez was signed as a free agent by the Brewers.
- December 1, 1999: Norberto Martin was signed as a free agent by the Brewers.
- December 2, 1999: Dave Weathers was signed as a free agent with the Milwaukee Brewers.
- December 14, 1998: The Brewers traded a player to be named later to the Minnesota Twins for Alex Ochoa. The Brewers completed the deal by sending Darrell Nicholas (minors) to the Twins on December 15.
- December 18, 1998: Marc Newfield was released by the Brewers.
- January 27, 1999: Jim Abbott was signed as a free agent by the Brewers.

== Regular season ==
- July 14, 1999: "Big Blue", a massive crane that was used to put the roof panels on soon to be completed Miller Park, collapsed while attempting to place one of the panels. Ultimately, this accident delayed the opening of Miller Park a full season and it wasn't opened until April 2001.

(1999)
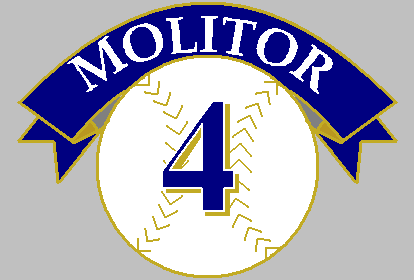
Paul Molitor
3B: 1978–92

=== Opening day starters ===
- Sean Berry
- Jeromy Burnitz
- Jeff Cirillo
- Marquis Grissom
- Geoff Jenkins
- Mark Loretta
- Dave Nilsson
- Bill Pulsipher
- Fernando Viña

=== Season standings ===
NL Central
Team	W	L	Pct.	GB	Home	Road
Houston Astros	97	65	.599	—	50‍–‍32	47‍–‍33
Cincinnati Reds	96	67	.589	1½	45‍–‍37	51‍–‍30
Pittsburgh Pirates	78	83	.484	18½	45‍–‍36	33‍–‍47
St. Louis Cardinals	75	86	.466	21½	38‍–‍42	37‍–‍44
Milwaukee Brewers	74	87	.460	22½	32‍–‍48	42‍–‍39
Chicago Cubs	67	95	.414	30	34‍–‍47	33‍–‍48

=== Record vs. opponents ===
1999 National League record Source: MLB Standings Grid – 1999
Team	AZ	ATL	CHC	CIN	COL	FLA	HOU	LAD	MIL	MON	NYM	PHI	PIT	SD	SF	STL	AL
Arizona	—	4–5	7–2	1–8	6–7	8–1	5–4	7–6	5–4	6–3	7–2	8–1	5–2	11–2	9–3	4–4	7–8
Atlanta	5–4	—	2–5	8–1	5–4	9–4	6–1	5–4	5–2	9–4	9–3	8–5	6–3	5–4	4–5	8–1	9–9
Chicago	2–7	5–2	—	5–8	4–5	6–3	3–9	2–7	6–6	2–5	3–6	2–7	7–6	6–3	1–7	7–5	6–9
Cincinnati	8–1	1–8	8–5	—	7–2	6–1	9–4	4–3	6–6	4–3	5–5	6–3	7–6	6–3	4–5	8–4	7–8
Colorado	7–6	4–5	5–4	2–7	—	5–4	2–6	8–5	6–3	6–3	4–5	5–4	2–7	4–9	4–9	4–5	4–8
Florida	1–8	4–9	3–6	1–6	4–5	—	2–7	7–2	5–4	8–4	3–10	2–11	3–4	3–6	4–5	3–4	11–7
Houston	4–5	1–6	9–3	4–9	6–2	7–2	—	6–3	8–5	7–2	4–5	6–1	5–7	8–1	5–4	5–7	12–3
Los Angeles	6–7	4–5	7–2	3–4	5–8	2–7	3–6	—	7–2	5–4	4–4	6–3	3–6	3–9	8–5	3–6	8–7
Milwaukee	4–5	2–5	6–6	6–6	3–6	4–5	5–8	2–7	—	5–4	2–5	5–4	8–4	3–5	4–5	7–6	8–6
Montreal	3–6	4–9	5–2	3–4	3–6	4–8	2–7	4–5	4–5	—	5–8	6–6	3–6	5–3	4–5	5–4	8–10
New York	2–7	3–9	6–3	5–5	5–4	10–3	5–4	4–4	5–2	8–5	—	6–6	7–2	7–2	7–2	5–2	12–6
Philadelphia	1–8	5–8	7–2	3–6	4–5	11–2	1–6	3–6	4–5	6–6	6–6	—	3–4	6–3	2–6	4–5	11–7
Pittsburgh	2–5	3–6	6–7	6–7	7–2	4–3	7–5	6–3	4–8	6–3	2–7	4–3	—	3–6	4–5	7–5	7–8
San Diego	2–11	4–5	3–6	3–6	9–4	6–3	1–8	9–3	5–3	3–5	2–7	3–6	6–3	—	5–7	2–7	11–4
San Francisco	3–9	5–4	7–1	5–4	9–4	5–4	4–5	5–8	5–4	5–4	2–7	6–2	5–4	7–5	—	6–3	7–8
St. Louis	4–4	1–8	5–7	4–8	5–4	4–3	7–5	6–3	6–7	4–5	2–5	5–4	5–7	7–2	3–6	—	7–8

=== Notable transactions ===
- April 12, 1999: Aaron Small was signed as a free agent by the Brewers.
- May 23, 1999: Aaron Small was released by the Brewers.
- June 2, 1999: Ben Sheets was drafted by the Brewers in the 1st round (10th pick) of the 1999 Major League Baseball draft. Player signed July 30, 1999.
- August 12, 1999: Jason Bere was signed as a free agent by the Brewers.
- August 18, 1999: Rich Becker was traded by the Brewers to the Oakland Athletics for a player to be named later. The Athletics completed the deal by sending Carl Dale to the Brewers on August 20.

=== Roster ===
1999 Milwaukee Brewers
Roster
Pitchers: 25 Jim Abbott; 47 Jason Bere; 32 Rocky Coppinger; 13 Jeff D'Amico; 51 Carl Dale; 58 Valerio de los Santos; 21 Cal Eldred; 51 Horacio Estrada; 48 Steve Falteisek; 40 Chad Fox; 45 Reggie Harris; 42 Scott Karl; 28 Mike Myers; 11 Hideo Nomo; 41 Kyle Peterson; 43 Jim Pittsley; 38 Eric Plunk; 46 Bill Pulsipher; 54 Héctor Ramírez; 47 Al Reyes; 52 Rafael Roque; 49 David Weathers; 27 Bob Wickman; 37 Steve Woodard	Catchers: 50 Robinson Cancel; 18 Charlie Greene; 31 Bobby Hughes; 14 Dave Nilsson; Infielders: 23 Brian Banks; 22 Kevin Barker; 10 Ronnie Belliard; 7 Sean Berry; 26 Jeff Cirillo; 16 Lou Collier; 8 Mark Loretta; 2 José Valentín; 1 Fernando Viña; 45,47 Eddie Zosky	Outfielders: 22 Rich Becker; 20 Jeromy Burnitz; 9 Marquis Grissom; 5 Geoff Jenkins; 33 Lyle Mouton; 24 Alex Ochoa	Manager: 3 Phil Garner; 29 Jim Lefebvre; Coaches: 39 Bill Campbell (Pitching); 35 Bill Castro (Bullpen); ? Ron Jackson (First Base), (Hitting); 29 Jim Lefebvre (Hitting); 36 Doug Mansolino(Third Base); 12 Bob Melvin (Bench)

== Player stats ==
= Indicates team leader

=== Batting ===
==== Starters by position ====
Note: Pos = Position; G = Games played; AB = At Bats; R = Runs; H = Hits; HR = Home runs; RBI = Runs batted in; Avg. = Batting average; SB = Stolen bases

Pos	Player	G	AB	R	H	HR	RBI	Avg.	SB
C	Dave Nilsson	115	343	56	106	21	62	.309	1
1B	Mark Loretta	153	587	93	170	5	67	.290	4
2B	Ron Belliard	124	457	60	135	8	58	.295	4
3B	Jeff Cirillo	157	607	98	198	15	88	.326	7
SS	José Valentín	89	256	45	58	10	38	.227	3
CF	Marquis Grissom	154	603	92	161	20	83	.267	24
RF	Jeromy Burnitz	130	467	87	126	33	103	.270	7
LF	Geoff Jenkins	135	447	70	140	21	82	.313	5

==== Other batters ====
Note: G = Games played; AB = At bats; R = Runs; H = Hits; HR = Home runs; RBI = Runs batted in; Avg. = Batting average; SB = Stolen bases

Player	G	AB	R	H	HR	RBI	Avg.	SB
Alex Ochoa	119	277	47	83	8	40	.300	6
Sean Berry	106	259	26	59	2	23	.228	0
Brian Banks	105	219	34	53	5	22	.242	6
Fernando Viña	37	154	17	41	1	16	.266	5
Rich Becker	89	139	15	35	5	16	.252	5
Lou Collier	74	135	18	35	2	21	.259	3
Kevin Barker	38	117	13	33	3	23	.282	1
Bobby Hughes	48	101	10	26	3	8	.257	0
Robinson Cancel	15	44	5	8	0	5	.182	0
Charlie Greene	32	42	4	8	0	1	.190	0
Lyle Mouton	14	17	2	3	1	3	.176	0
Eddie Zosky	8	7	1	1	0	0	.143	0

=== Pitching ===
==== Starting pitchers ====
Note: G = Games pitched; IP = Innings pitched; W = Wins; L = Losses; ERA = Earned run average; SO = Strikeouts; BB = Walks allowed

Player	G	IP	W	L	ERA	SO	BB
Scott Karl	33	197.2	11	11	4.78	74	69
Steve Woodard	31	185.0	11	8	4.52	119	36
Hideo Nomo	28	176.1	12	8	4.54	161	78
Bill Pulsipher	19	87.1	5	6	5.98	42	36
Cal Eldred	20	82.0	2	8	7.79	60	46
Jim Abbott	20	82.0	2	8	6.91	37	42
Jason Bere	5	23.1	2	0	4.63	19	10

==== Other pitchers ====
Note: G = Games; IP = Inning pitched; W = Wins; L = Losses; ERA = Earned run average; SO = Strikeouts

Player	G	IP	W	L	ERA	SO
Rafael Roque	43	84.1	1	6	5.34	66
Kyle Peterson	17	77.0	4	7	4.56	34

==== Relief pitchers ====
Note: G = Games pitched; W = Wins; L = Losses; SV = Saves; ERA = Earned run average; SO = Strikeouts

Player	G	W	L	SV	ERA	SO
Bob Wickman	71	3	8	37	3.39	60
Mike Myers	71	2	1	0	5.23	35
Eric Plunk	68	4	4	0	5.02	63
David Weathers	63	7	4	2	4.65	74
Rocky Coppinger	29	5	3	0	3.68	39
Al Reyes	26	2	0	0	4.25	39
Héctor Ramírez	15	1	2	0	3.43	9
Jim Pittsley	15	0	1	0	4.82	13
Steve Falteisek	10	0	0	0	7.50	5
Reggie Harris	8	0	0	0	3.00	11
Valerio De Los Santos	7	0	1	0	6.48	5
Chad Fox	6	0	0	0	10.80	12
Horacio Estrada	4	0	0	0	7.36	5
Carl Dale	4	0	1	0	20.25	4
Jeff D'Amico	1	0	0	0	0.00	1

== Farm system ==
The Brewers' farm system consisted of eight minor league affiliates in 1999. The Brewers operated a Venezuelan Summer League team as a co-op with the Philadelphia Phillies and San Francisco Giants.

Level	Team	League	Manager
Triple-A	Louisville RiverBats	International League	Gary Allenson
Double-A	Huntsville Stars	Southern League	Darrell Evans
Class A-Advanced	Stockton Ports	California League	Bernie Moncallo and Carlos Ponce
Class A	Beloit Snappers	Midwest League	Don Money
Rookie	Helena Brewers	Pioneer League	Carlos Lezcano
Rookie	Ogden Raptors	Pioneer League	Jon Pont and Ed Sedar
Rookie	DSL Brewers	Dominican Summer League	—
Rookie	VSL La Victoria	Venezuelan Summer League	—
