= 1999 Montreal Expos season =

1999 Montreal Expos
- League: National League
- Division: East
- Ballpark: Olympic Stadium
- City: Montreal
- Record: 68–94
- Divisional place: 4th
- Owners: Claude Brochu
- General managers: Jim Beattie
- Managers: Felipe Alou
- Television: The Sports Network (Dave Van Horne, Gary Carter) SRC (Claude Raymond, Rene Pothier); RDS Network (Denis Casavant, Rodger Brulotte, Marc Griffin, Alain Chantelois)
- Radio: CIQC (Dave Van Horne, Joe Cannon, Elliott Price) CKAC (AM) (Jacques Doucet, Rodger Brulotte)

The 1999 Montreal Expos season was the 31st season in franchise history.

== Offseason ==
Future Heisman Trophy winner Ricky Williams was taken by the Montreal Expos in the 1998 Rule 5 draft. The Expos sold his rights to the Texas Rangers.

== Spring training ==
In 1999, the Expos held spring training at Roger Dean Stadium in Jupiter, Florida, a facility they shared with the St. Louis Cardinals. It was their second season there.

== Regular season ==
=== Opening Day starters ===
- Shane Andrews
- Miguel Batista
- Orlando Cabrera
- Brad Fullmer
- Vladimir Guerrero
- Wilton Guerrero
- Manny Martínez
- Rondell White
- Chris Widger

=== Season standings ===
NL East
Team	W	L	Pct.	GB	Home	Road
Atlanta Braves	103	59	.636	—	56‍–‍25	47‍–‍34
New York Mets	97	66	.595	6½	49‍–‍32	48‍–‍34
Philadelphia Phillies	77	85	.475	26	41‍–‍40	36‍–‍45
Montreal Expos	68	94	.420	35	35‍–‍46	33‍–‍48
Florida Marlins	64	98	.395	39	35‍–‍45	29‍–‍53

=== Record vs. opponents ===
1999 National League record Source: MLB Standings Grid – 1999
Team	AZ	ATL	CHC	CIN	COL	FLA	HOU	LAD	MIL	MON	NYM	PHI	PIT	SD	SF	STL	AL
Arizona	—	4–5	7–2	1–8	6–7	8–1	5–4	7–6	5–4	6–3	7–2	8–1	5–2	11–2	9–3	4–4	7–8
Atlanta	5–4	—	2–5	8–1	5–4	9–4	6–1	5–4	5–2	9–4	9–3	8–5	6–3	5–4	4–5	8–1	9–9
Chicago	2–7	5–2	—	5–8	4–5	6–3	3–9	2–7	6–6	2–5	3–6	2–7	7–6	6–3	1–7	7–5	6–9
Cincinnati	8–1	1–8	8–5	—	7–2	6–1	9–4	4–3	6–6	4–3	5–5	6–3	7–6	6–3	4–5	8–4	7–8
Colorado	7–6	4–5	5–4	2–7	—	5–4	2–6	8–5	6–3	6–3	4–5	5–4	2–7	4–9	4–9	4–5	4–8
Florida	1–8	4–9	3–6	1–6	4–5	—	2–7	7–2	5–4	8–4	3–10	2–11	3–4	3–6	4–5	3–4	11–7
Houston	4–5	1–6	9–3	4–9	6–2	7–2	—	6–3	8–5	7–2	4–5	6–1	5–7	8–1	5–4	5–7	12–3
Los Angeles	6–7	4–5	7–2	3–4	5–8	2–7	3–6	—	7–2	5–4	4–4	6–3	3–6	3–9	8–5	3–6	8–7
Milwaukee	4–5	2–5	6–6	6–6	3–6	4–5	5–8	2–7	—	5–4	2–5	5–4	8–4	3–5	4–5	7–6	8–6
Montreal	3–6	4–9	5–2	3–4	3–6	4–8	2–7	4–5	4–5	—	5–8	6–6	3–6	5–3	4–5	5–4	8–10
New York	2–7	3–9	6–3	5–5	5–4	10–3	5–4	4–4	5–2	8–5	—	6–6	7–2	7–2	7–2	5–2	12–6
Philadelphia	1–8	5–8	7–2	3–6	4–5	11–2	1–6	3–6	4–5	6–6	6–6	—	3–4	6–3	2–6	4–5	11–7
Pittsburgh	2–5	3–6	6–7	6–7	7–2	4–3	7–5	6–3	4–8	6–3	2–7	4–3	—	3–6	4–5	7–5	7–8
San Diego	2–11	4–5	3–6	3–6	9–4	6–3	1–8	9–3	5–3	3–5	2–7	3–6	6–3	—	5–7	2–7	11–4
San Francisco	3–9	5–4	7–1	5–4	9–4	5–4	4–5	5–8	5–4	5–4	2–7	6–2	5–4	7–5	—	6–3	7–8
St. Louis	4–4	1–8	5–7	4–8	5–4	4–3	7–5	6–3	6–7	4–5	2–5	5–4	5–7	7–2	3–6	—	7–8

Expos vs. American League
Team	AL East				
Team	BAL	BOS	NYY	TB	TOR
Montreal	0–3	3–0	1–2	2–1	2–4

=== Transactions ===
- May 17, 1999: Mel Rojas was signed as a free agent with the Montreal Expos.
- June 2, 1999: Brandon Phillips was drafted by the Montreal Expos in the 2nd round of the 1999 amateur draft. Player signed June 21, 1999.
- July 3, 1999: Mel Rojas was released by the Montreal Expos.

=== Roster ===
1999 Montreal Expos
Roster
Pitchers: 51 Tony Armas Jr.; 36 Bobby Ayala; 48 Miguel Batista; 21 Shayne Bennett; 34 Rick DeHart; 30 Dustin Hermanson; 47 Mike Johnson; 44 Steve Kline; 28 Ted Lilly; 51 Mike Maddux; 40 Guillermo Mota; 45 Carl Pavano; 49 Jeremy Powell; 51 Mel Rojas; 56 J. D. Smart; 43 Dan Smith; 52 Scott Strickland; 32 Anthony Telford; 35 Mike Thurman; 41 Ugueth Urbina; 23 Javier Vázquez	Catchers: 37 Darron Cox; 55 Robert Machado; 16 Chris Widger; Infielders: 11 Shane Andrews; 5 Michael Barrett; 50 Geoff Blum; 18 Orlando Cabrera; 53 Trace Coquillette; 14 José Fernández; 20 Brad Fullmer; 4 Wilton Guerrero; 6 Ryan McGuire; 12 Mike Mordecai; 19 Fernando Seguignol; 3 José Vidro	Outfielders: 33 Peter Bergeron; 27 Vladimir Guerrero; 9 Terry Jones; 31 Manny Martínez; 7 Orlando Merced; 24 James Mouton; 34 Chris Stowers; 22 Rondell White	Manager: 17 Felipe Alou; Coaches: 67 Pierre Arsenault (Bullpen); 26 Bobby Cuellar (Pitching); 2 Gene Glynn (First base); 1 Tommy Harper (Hitting); 25 Pete Mackanin (Third base); 55 Luis Pujols (Bench)

== Player stats ==
= Indicates team leader

=== Batting ===
==== Starters by position ====
Note: Pos = Position; G = Games played; AB = At bats; H = Hits; Avg. = Batting average; HR = Home runs; RBI = Runs batted in

Pos	Player	G	AB	H	Avg.	HR	RBI
C	Chris Widger	124	383	101	.264	14	56
1B	Brad Fullmer	100	347	96	.277	9	47
2B	José Vidro	140	494	150	.304	12	59
SS	Orlando Cabrera	104	382	97	.254	8	39
3B	Shane Andrews	98	281	51	.181	11	37
LF	Rondell White	138	539	168	.312	22	64
CF	Manny Martínez	137	331	81	.245	2	26
RF	Vladimir Guerrero	160	610	193	.316	42	131

==== Other batters ====
Note: G = Games played; AB = At bats; H = Hits; Avg. = Batting average; HR = Home runs; RBI = Runs batted in

Player	G	AB	H	Avg.	HR	RBI
Michael Barrett	126	433	127	.293	8	52
Wilton Guerrero	132	315	92	.292	2	31
Mike Mordecai	109	226	53	.235	5	25
Orlando Merced	93	194	52	.268	8	26
Ryan McGuire	88	140	31	.221	2	18
Geoff Blum	45	133	32	.241	8	18
James Mouton	95	122	32	.262	2	13
Fernando Seguignol	35	105	27	.257	5	10
Terry Jones	17	63	17	.270	0	3
Trace Coquillette	17	49	13	.265	0	4
Peter Bergeron	16	45	11	.244	0	1
Darron Cox	15	25	6	.240	1	2
José Fernández	8	24	5	.208	0	1
Robert Machado	17	22	4	.182	0	0
Chris Stowers	4	2	0	.000	0	0

=== Pitching ===
==== Starting pitchers ====
Note: G = Games pitched; IP = Innings pitched; W = Wins; L = Losses; ERA = Earned run average; SO = Strikeouts

Player	G	IP	W	L	ERA	SO
Dustin Hermanson	34	216.1	9	14	4.20	145
Javier Vázquez	26	154.2	9	8	5.00	113
Mike Thurman	29	146.2	7	11	4.05	85
Carl Pavano	19	104.0	6	8	5.63	70
Jeremy Powell	17	97.0	4	8	4.73	44
Dan Smith	20	89.2	4	9	6.02	72
Tony Armas Jr.	1	6.0	0	1	1.50	2

==== Other pitchers ====
Note: G = Games pitched; IP = Innings pitched; W = Wins; L = Losses; ERA = Earned run average; SO = Strikeouts

Player	G	IP	W	L	ERA	SO
Miguel Batista	39	134.2	8	7	4.88	95
Ted Lilly	9	23.2	0	1	7.61	28
Shayne Bennett	5	11.1	0	1	14.29	4
Mike Johnson	3	8.1	0	0	8.64	6

==== Relief pitchers ====
Note: G = Games pitched; W = Wins; L = Losses; SV = Saves; ERA = Earned run average; SO = Strikeouts

Player	G	W	L	SV	ERA	SO
Ugueth Urbina	71	6	6	41	3.69	100
Steve Kline	82	7	4	0	3.75	69
Anthony Telford	79	5	4	2	3.94	69
Bobby Ayala	53	1	6	0	3.68	64
Guillermo Mota	51	2	4	0	2.93	27
J.D. Smart	29	0	1	0	5.02	21
Scott Strickland	17	0	1	0	4.50	23
Mike Maddux	4	0	0	0	9.00	4
Mel Rojas	3	0	0	0	16.88	1
Rick DeHart	3	0	0	0	21.60	1

== Award winners ==
1999 Major League Baseball All-Star Game

- Vladimir Guerrero, outfield, reserve

== Farm system ==
Level	Team	League	Manager
AAA	Ottawa Lynx	International League	Jeff Cox
AA	Harrisburg Senators	Eastern League	Doug Sisson and Rick Sweet
A	Jupiter Hammerheads	Florida State League	Luis Dorante
A	Cape Fear Crocs	South Atlantic League	Frank Kremblas
A-Short Season	Vermont Expos	New York–Penn League	Tony Barbone
Rookie	GCL Expos	Gulf Coast League	Bill Masse

LEAGUE CHAMPIONS: Harrisburg
