= 1999 St. Louis Cardinals season =

Major League Baseball season

1999 St. Louis Cardinals
- League: National League
- Division: Central
- Ballpark: Busch Memorial Stadium
- City: St. Louis, Missouri
- Record: 75–86 (.466)
- Divisional place: 4th
- Owners: William DeWitt, Jr.
- General managers: Walt Jocketty
- Managers: Tony La Russa
- Television: Fox Sports Midwest; KPLR (Al Hrabosky, Bob Carpenter, Ozzie Smith, Joe Buck)
- Radio: KMOX (Jack Buck, Mike Shannon, Joe Buck)

The 1999 St. Louis Cardinals season was the team's 118th season in St. Louis, Missouri and the 108th season in the National League. The Cardinals went 75–86 during the season and finished fourth in the National League Central division, 21½ games behind the Houston Astros.

== Offseason ==
- November 19, 1998: Eric Davis was signed as a free agent with the St. Louis Cardinals.
- November 19, 1998: Ricky Bottalico was traded by the Philadelphia Phillies with Garrett Stephenson to the St. Louis Cardinals for Jeff Brantley, Ron Gant, and Cliff Politte.
- December 7, 1998: Willie McGee was signed as a free agent with the St. Louis Cardinals.
- December 14, 1998: Édgar Rentería was traded by the Florida Marlins to the St. Louis Cardinals for Armando Almanza, Braden Looper, and Pablo Ozuna.
- January 15, 1999: Mike Mohler was signed as a free agent with the St. Louis Cardinals.

== Regular season ==
- On April 23, 1999, Fernando Tatís hit two grand slams in the third inning, both off Chan Ho Park.
- In 1999, Mark McGwire drove in a league-leading 147 runs while only having 145 hits, the highest RBI-per-hit tally in baseball history.

=== Season standings ===
NL Central
Team	W	L	Pct.	GB	Home	Road
Houston Astros	97	65	.599	—	50‍–‍32	47‍–‍33
Cincinnati Reds	96	67	.589	1½	45‍–‍37	51‍–‍30
Pittsburgh Pirates	78	83	.484	18½	45‍–‍36	33‍–‍47
St. Louis Cardinals	75	86	.466	21½	38‍–‍42	37‍–‍44
Milwaukee Brewers	74	87	.460	22½	32‍–‍48	42‍–‍39
Chicago Cubs	67	95	.414	30	34‍–‍47	33‍–‍48

=== Record vs. opponents ===
1999 National League record Source: MLB Standings Grid – 1999
Team	AZ	ATL	CHC	CIN	COL	FLA	HOU	LAD	MIL	MON	NYM	PHI	PIT	SD	SF	STL	AL
Arizona	—	4–5	7–2	1–8	6–7	8–1	5–4	7–6	5–4	6–3	7–2	8–1	5–2	11–2	9–3	4–4	7–8
Atlanta	5–4	—	2–5	8–1	5–4	9–4	6–1	5–4	5–2	9–4	9–3	8–5	6–3	5–4	4–5	8–1	9–9
Chicago	2–7	5–2	—	5–8	4–5	6–3	3–9	2–7	6–6	2–5	3–6	2–7	7–6	6–3	1–7	7–5	6–9
Cincinnati	8–1	1–8	8–5	—	7–2	6–1	9–4	4–3	6–6	4–3	5–5	6–3	7–6	6–3	4–5	8–4	7–8
Colorado	7–6	4–5	5–4	2–7	—	5–4	2–6	8–5	6–3	6–3	4–5	5–4	2–7	4–9	4–9	4–5	4–8
Florida	1–8	4–9	3–6	1–6	4–5	—	2–7	7–2	5–4	8–4	3–10	2–11	3–4	3–6	4–5	3–4	11–7
Houston	4–5	1–6	9–3	4–9	6–2	7–2	—	6–3	8–5	7–2	4–5	6–1	5–7	8–1	5–4	5–7	12–3
Los Angeles	6–7	4–5	7–2	3–4	5–8	2–7	3–6	—	7–2	5–4	4–4	6–3	3–6	3–9	8–5	3–6	8–7
Milwaukee	4–5	2–5	6–6	6–6	3–6	4–5	5–8	2–7	—	5–4	2–5	5–4	8–4	3–5	4–5	7–6	8–6
Montreal	3–6	4–9	5–2	3–4	3–6	4–8	2–7	4–5	4–5	—	5–8	6–6	3–6	5–3	4–5	5–4	8–10
New York	2–7	3–9	6–3	5–5	5–4	10–3	5–4	4–4	5–2	8–5	—	6–6	7–2	7–2	7–2	5–2	12–6
Philadelphia	1–8	5–8	7–2	3–6	4–5	11–2	1–6	3–6	4–5	6–6	6–6	—	3–4	6–3	2–6	4–5	11–7
Pittsburgh	2–5	3–6	6–7	6–7	7–2	4–3	7–5	6–3	4–8	6–3	2–7	4–3	—	3–6	4–5	7–5	7–8
San Diego	2–11	4–5	3–6	3–6	9–4	6–3	1–8	9–3	5–3	3–5	2–7	3–6	6–3	—	5–7	2–7	11–4
San Francisco	3–9	5–4	7–1	5–4	9–4	5–4	4–5	5–8	5–4	5–4	2–7	6–2	5–4	7–5	—	6–3	7–8
St. Louis	4–4	1–8	5–7	4–8	5–4	4–3	7–5	6–3	6–7	4–5	2–5	5–4	5–7	7–2	3–6	—	7–8

=== Transactions ===
- May 15, 1999: Heathcliff Slocumb was signed as a free agent with the St. Louis Cardinals.
- June 2, 1999: Albert Pujols was drafted by the St. Louis Cardinals in the 13th round of the 1999 amateur draft. Player signed August 17, 1999.

=== Roster ===
1999 St. Louis Cardinals
Roster
Pitchers: 53 Juan Acevedo; 66 Rick Ankiel; 38 Manny Aybar; 41 Alan Benes; 52 Ricky Bottalico; 37 Kent Bottenfield; 54 Mike Busby; 44 Rich Croushore; 48,62 Rick Heiserman; 49 José Jiménez; 57 Curtis King; 63 Larry Luebbers; 43 Kent Mercker; 32 Mike Mohler; 33 Darren Oliver; 31 Donovan Osborne; 28 Lance Painter; 36 Scott Radinsky; 58 Heathcliff Slocumb; 50 Clint Sodowsky; 55 Garrett Stephenson; 43 Mark Thompson	Catchers: 30 Alberto Castillo; 59 Marcus Jensen; 26 Eli Marrero; Infielders: 29 David Howard; 8 Adam Kennedy; 47 Joe McEwing; 25 Mark McGwire; 13 Luis Ordaz; 27 Plácido Polanco; 3 Édgar Rentería; 23 Fernando Tatís	Outfielders: 22 Darren Bragg; 24 Eric Davis; 7 J. D. Drew; 21 Shawon Dunston; 5 Thomas Howard; 16 Ray Lankford; 51 Willie McGee; 21 Craig Paquette; 48 Eduardo Pérez	Manager: 10 Tony La Russa; Coaches: 34 Mark DeJohn (Bullpen); 18 Dave Duncan (Pitching); 19 Mike Easler (Hitting); 15 Rene Lachemann (Third Base); 39 Dave McKay (First Base); 11 Jose Oquendo (Bench)

== Player stats ==
=== Batting ===
==== Starters by position ====
Note: Pos = Position; G = Games played; AB = At bats; H = Hits; Avg. = Batting average; HR = Home runs; RBI = Runs batted in

Pos	Player	G	AB	H	Avg.	HR	RBI
C	Eli Marrero	114	317	61	.192	6	34
1B	Mark McGwire	153	521	145	.278	65	147
2B	Joe McEwing	152	513	141	.275	9	44
SS	Édgar Rentería	154	585	161	.275	11	63
3B	Fernando Tatis	149	537	160	.298	34	107
LF	Ray Lankford	122	422	129	.306	15	63
CF	J.D. Drew	104	368	89	.242	13	39
RF	Eric Davis	58	191	49	.257	5	30

==== Other batters ====
Note: G = Games played; AB = At bats; H = Hits; Avg. = Batting average; HR = Home runs; RBI = Runs batted in

Player	G	AB	H	Avg.	HR	RBI
Darren Bragg	93	273	71	.260	6	26
Willie McGee	132	271	68	.251	0	20
Alberto Castillo	93	255	67	.263	4	31
Plácido Polanco	88	220	61	.277	1	19
Thomas Howard	98	195	57	.292	6	28
Craig Paquette	48	157	45	.287	10	37
Shawon Dunston	62	150	46	.307	5	25
Adam Kennedy	33	102	26	.255	1	16
David Howard	52	82	17	.207	1	6
Marcus Jensen	16	34	8	.235	1	1
Eduardo Pérez	21	32	11	.344	1	9
Luis Ordaz	10	9	1	.111	0	2

=== Pitching ===
==== Starting pitchers ====
Note: G = Games pitched; IP = Innings pitched; W = Wins; L = Losses; ERA = Earned run average; SO = Strikeouts

Player	G	IP	W	L	ERA	SO
Darren Oliver	30	196.1	9	9	4.26	119
Kent Bottenfield	31	190.1	18	7	3.97	124
José Jiménez	29	163.0	5	14	5.85	113
Larry Luebbers	8	45.2	3	3	5.12	16
Donovan Osborne	6	29.1	1	3	5.52	21
Mark Thompson	5	29.1	1	3	2.76	22

==== Other pitchers ====
Note: G = Games pitched; IP = Innings pitched; W = Wins; L = Losses; ERA = Earned run average; SO = Strikeouts

Player	G	IP	W	L	ERA	SO
Kent Mercker	25	103.2	6	5	5.12	64
Juan Acevedo	50	102.1	6	8	5.89	52
Garrett Stephenson	18	85.1	6	3	4.22	59
Rick Ankiel	9	33.0	0	1	3.27	39
Clint Sodowsky	3	6.1	0	1	15.63	2

==== Relief pitchers ====
Note: G = Games pitched; W = Wins; L = Losses; SV = Saves; ERA = Earned run average; SO = Strikeouts

Player	G	W	L	SV	ERA	SO
Ricky Bottalico	68	3	7	20	4.91	66
Manny Aybar	65	4	5	3	5.47	74
Rich Croushore	59	3	7	3	4.14	88
Lance Painter	56	4	5	1	4.83	56
Mike Mohler	48	1	1	1	4.38	31
Scott Radinsky	43	2	1	3	4.88	17
Heathcliff Slocumb	40	3	2	2	2.36	48
Mike Busby	15	0	1	0	7.13	7
Rick Heiserman	3	0	0	0	8.31	4
Alan Benes	2	0	0	0	0.00	2
Curtis King	2	0	0	0	18.00	1

== Awards and records ==
- Mark McGwire, Major League record: First player to hit at least 50 home runs in four consecutive seasons

== Farm system ==
Level	Team	League	Manager
AAA	Memphis Redbirds	Pacific Coast League	Gaylen Pitts
AA	Arkansas Travelers	Texas League	Chris Maloney
A	Potomac Cannons	Carolina League	Joe Cunningham, Jr.
A	Peoria Chiefs	Midwest League	Brian Rupp
A-Short Season	New Jersey Cardinals	New York–Penn League	José Oquendo
Rookie	Johnson City Cardinals	Appalachian League	Steve Turco
