= 1999 San Diego Padres season =

1999 San Diego Padres
- League: National League
- Division: West
- Ballpark: Qualcomm Stadium
- City: San Diego, California
- Record: 74–88 (.457)
- Divisional place: 4th
- Owners: John Moores
- General managers: Kevin Towers
- Managers: Bruce Bochy
- Television: KUSI-TV; 4SD (Mark Grant, Mel Proctor, Rick Sutcliffe)
- Radio: KFMB (AM) (Jerry Coleman, Ted Leitner, Bob Chandler); KURS (Rene Mora, Juan Avila, Eduardo Ortega)

The 1999 San Diego Padres season was the 31st season in franchise history. They finished fourth in the National League West. They had lost several key players after their 1998 pennant-winning season, most notably pitching ace Kevin Brown.

== Offseason ==
=== Acquisitions ===
- November 13, 1998: John Vander Wal was signed as a free agent with the San Diego Padres.
- November 17, 1998: Archi Cianfrocco was released by the San Diego Padres.
- February 2, 1999: Mark Sweeney was traded by the San Diego Padres with Greg Vaughn to the Cincinnati Reds for Damian Jackson, Reggie Sanders, and Josh Harris (minors).
- Starting pitcher Joey Hamilton traded to the Toronto Blue Jays for starting pitchers Woody Williams and reliever Carlos Almanzar

=== Free agent losses ===
- Kevin Brown
- Ken Caminiti
- Steve Finley

== Regular season ==
The Padres played in the first game ever at Safeco Field on July 15, 1999. The Mariners lost to the Padres by a score of 3 to 2. It was the first park in Major League history to host an interleague game on its inaugural day.

=== Opening Day starters ===
- George Arias
- Andy Ashby
- Chris Gomez
- Tony Gwynn
- Wally Joyner
- Greg Myers
- Rubén Rivera
- Reggie Sanders
- Quilvio Veras

=== Season standings ===
NL West
Team	W	L	Pct.	GB	Home	Road
Arizona Diamondbacks	100	62	.617	—	52‍–‍29	48‍–‍33
San Francisco Giants	86	76	.531	14	49‍–‍32	37‍–‍44
Los Angeles Dodgers	77	85	.475	23	37‍–‍44	40‍–‍41
San Diego Padres	74	88	.457	26	46‍–‍35	28‍–‍53
Colorado Rockies	72	90	.444	28	39‍–‍42	33‍–‍48

=== Record vs. opponents ===
1999 National League record Source: MLB Standings Grid – 1999
Team	AZ	ATL	CHC	CIN	COL	FLA	HOU	LAD	MIL	MON	NYM	PHI	PIT	SD	SF	STL	AL
Arizona	—	4–5	7–2	1–8	6–7	8–1	5–4	7–6	5–4	6–3	7–2	8–1	5–2	11–2	9–3	4–4	7–8
Atlanta	5–4	—	2–5	8–1	5–4	9–4	6–1	5–4	5–2	9–4	9–3	8–5	6–3	5–4	4–5	8–1	9–9
Chicago	2–7	5–2	—	5–8	4–5	6–3	3–9	2–7	6–6	2–5	3–6	2–7	7–6	6–3	1–7	7–5	6–9
Cincinnati	8–1	1–8	8–5	—	7–2	6–1	9–4	4–3	6–6	4–3	5–5	6–3	7–6	6–3	4–5	8–4	7–8
Colorado	7–6	4–5	5–4	2–7	—	5–4	2–6	8–5	6–3	6–3	4–5	5–4	2–7	4–9	4–9	4–5	4–8
Florida	1–8	4–9	3–6	1–6	4–5	—	2–7	7–2	5–4	8–4	3–10	2–11	3–4	3–6	4–5	3–4	11–7
Houston	4–5	1–6	9–3	4–9	6–2	7–2	—	6–3	8–5	7–2	4–5	6–1	5–7	8–1	5–4	5–7	12–3
Los Angeles	6–7	4–5	7–2	3–4	5–8	2–7	3–6	—	7–2	5–4	4–4	6–3	3–6	3–9	8–5	3–6	8–7
Milwaukee	4–5	2–5	6–6	6–6	3–6	4–5	5–8	2–7	—	5–4	2–5	5–4	8–4	3–5	4–5	7–6	8–6
Montreal	3–6	4–9	5–2	3–4	3–6	4–8	2–7	4–5	4–5	—	5–8	6–6	3–6	5–3	4–5	5–4	8–10
New York	2–7	3–9	6–3	5–5	5–4	10–3	5–4	4–4	5–2	8–5	—	6–6	7–2	7–2	7–2	5–2	12–6
Philadelphia	1–8	5–8	7–2	3–6	4–5	11–2	1–6	3–6	4–5	6–6	6–6	—	3–4	6–3	2–6	4–5	11–7
Pittsburgh	2–5	3–6	6–7	6–7	7–2	4–3	7–5	6–3	4–8	6–3	2–7	4–3	—	3–6	4–5	7–5	7–8
San Diego	2–11	4–5	3–6	3–6	9–4	6–3	1–8	9–3	5–3	3–5	2–7	3–6	6–3	—	5–7	2–7	11–4
San Francisco	3–9	5–4	7–1	5–4	9–4	5–4	4–5	5–8	5–4	5–4	2–7	6–2	5–4	7–5	—	6–3	7–8
St. Louis	4–4	1–8	5–7	4–8	5–4	4–3	7–5	6–3	6–7	4–5	2–5	5–4	5–7	7–2	3–6	—	7–8

=== Notable transactions ===
- July 31, 1999: Jim Leyritz was traded by the San Diego Padres to the New York Yankees for Geraldo Padua (minors).

=== Roster ===
1999 San Diego Padres
Roster
Pitchers: 40 Carlos Almanzar; 43 Andy Ashby; 37 Brian Boehringer; 58 Buddy Carlyle; 31 Matt Clement; 39 Will Cunnane; 46 Domingo Guzmán; 41 Sterling Hitchcock; 51 Trevor Hoffman; 33 Dan Miceli; 27 Heath Murray; 44 Carlos Reyes; 32 Roberto Rivera; 34 Stan Spencer; 52 Ed Vosberg; 36 Donne Wall; 50 Matt Whisenant; 49 Matt Whiteside; 18 Woody Williams	Catchers: 25 Ben Davis; 7 Wiki González; 13 Jim Leyritz; 20 Greg Myers; Infielders: 14 George Arias; 1 Carlos Baerga; 1 Carlos García; 17 Ed Giovanola; 10 Chris Gomez; 2 Damian Jackson; 22 Wally Joyner; 12 Dave Magadan; 23 Phil Nevin; 24 David Newhan; 4 Quilvio Veras	Outfielders: 26 Mike Darr; 19 Tony Gwynn; 21 Gary Matthews Jr.; 3 Eric Owens; 28 Rubén Rivera; 16 Reggie Sanders; 29 John Vander Wal	Manager: 15 Bruce Bochy; Coaches: 38 Greg Booker (bullpen); 11 Tim Flannery (third base); 30 Davey Lopes (first base); 5 Rob Picciolo (bench); 8 Merv Rettenmund (hitting); 45 Dave Smith (pitching)

=== Tony Gwynn's 3000th hit ===
- August 6, 1999: Tony Gwynn of the San Diego Padres got the 3,000th hit of his career. After the hit, first base umpire Kerwin Danley personally congratulated Tony Gwynn after the hit because they were teammates at San Diego State. Gwynn had four singles in the game. Gwynn became the 22nd member of the 3,000 hit club and accomplished the feat on his mother's birthday.

==== Line score ====
August 6, Olympic Stadium, Montréal, Québec

Team	1	2	3	4	5	6	7	8	9	R	H	E
San Diego	4	1	0	2	0	1	0	2	2	12	17	3
Montreal	2	0	0	1	0	0	4	0	3	10	9	3
W: Sterling Hitchcock L: Dan Smith SV: Trevor Hoffman
HRs: Phil Nevin (6), Vladimir Guerrero (15), Chris Widger (23), Orlando Cabrera (7)
Attendance: 13,540 Time:3:18

==== Batting ====
San Diego Padres	AB	R	H	RBI	Montreal Expos	AB	R	H	RBI
Quilvio Veras, 2b	5	4	3	0	Manny Martínez	4	0	0	0
Carlos Reyes, p	0	0	0	0	Guillermo Mota, p	0	0	0	0
Trevor Hoffman, p	0	0	0	0	Anthony Telford, p	0	0	0	0
Tony Gwynn, lf	5	1	4	0	Wilton Guerrero, ph	1	0	1	2
Rubén Rivera, pr-cf	0	1	0	0	Michael Barrett, 3b	5	1	1	0
Reggie Sanders, lf-rf	5	1	2	1	Rondell White, lf	3	0	0	1
Phil Nevin, 3b	5	2	2	4	Vladimir Guerrero, rf	4	2	2	1
Wally Joyner, 1b	4	0	1	0	Chris Widger, c	4	2	2	1
Eric Owens, cf-lf	5	2	2	1	Brad Fullmer, 1b	2	0	0	0
Ben Davis	5	1	2	1	Bobby Ayala	0	0	0	0
Damian Jackson, ss	4	0	1	0	James Mouton, ph-cf	2	2	2	1
Damian Jackson, ss	4	0	1	0	Orlando Cabrera, ss	3	1	1	3
Damian Jackson, ss	4	0	1	0	Mike Mordecai, 2b	3	0	0	0
Sterling Hitchcock, p	3	0	0	0	Orlando Merced, ph	1	1	0	0
Will Cunnane, p	0	0	0	0	Dan Smith	0	0	0	0
John Vander Wal, ph	1	0	0	0	J.D. Smart, p	1	0	0	0
Dan Miceli, p	0	0	0	0	Shane Andrews, 1b	3	1	0	0
Dave Magadan, ph	0	0	0	1	NONE	0	0	0	0
Ed Giovanola, 2b	0	0	0	0	NONE	0	0	0	0
Totals	42	12	17	9	Totals	36	10	9	9

==== Pitching ====
San Diego Padres	IP	H	R	ER	BB	SO
Hitchcock, W	6.0	6	6	6	0	5
Cunnane	1.0	1	1	1	0	1
Miceli	1.0	0	0	0	0	0
Reyes	0.2	1	3	0	1	0
Hoffman, SV	0.1	1	0	0	0	0
Totals	9.0	9	10	7	1	6

Montreal Expos	IP	H	R	ER	BB	SO
Smith, L	0.2	5	4	4	1	0
J.D. Smart	3.1	6	3	3	1	1
Ayala	3.0	2	1	0	0	3
Mota	1.2	4	4	4	1	3
Telford	0.1	0	0	0	0	0
Totals	9.0	15	12	11	3	7

== Player stats ==
=== Batting ===
==== Starters by position ====
Note: Pos = Position; G = Games played; AB = At bats; H = Hits; Avg. = Batting average; HR = Home runs; RBI = Runs batted in

Pos	Player	G	AB	H	Avg.	HR	RBI
C	Ben Davis	76	266	65	.244	5	30
1B	Wally Joyner	110	323	80	.248	5	43
2B	Quilvio Veras	132	475	133	.280	6	41
3B	Phil Nevin	128	383	103	.269	24	85
SS	Damian Jackson	133	388	87	.224	9	39
LF	Reggie Sanders	133	478	136	.285	26	72
CF	Rubén Rivera	147	411	80	.195	23	48
RF	Tony Gwynn	111	411	139	.338	10	62

==== Other batters ====
Note: G = Games played; AB = At bats; H = Hits; Avg. = Batting average; HR = Home runs; RBI = Runs batted in

Player	G	AB	H	Avg.	HR	RBI
Eric Owens	149	440	117	.266	9	61
Dave Magadan	116	248	68	.274	2	30
John Vander Wal	132	246	67	.272	6	41
Chris Gomez	76	234	59	.252	1	15
George Arias	55	164	40	.244	7	20
Jim Leyritz	50	134	32	.239	8	21
Greg Myers	50	128	37	.289	3	15
Wiki González	30	83	21	.253	3	12
Carlos Baerga	33	80	20	.250	2	5
Ed Giovanola	56	58	11	.190	0	3
Mike Darr	25	48	13	.271	2	3
David Newhan	32	43	6	.140	2	6
Gary Matthews Jr.	23	36	8	.222	0	7
Carlos García	6	11	2	.182	0	0

=== Pitching ===
==== Starting pitchers ====
Note: G = Games pitched; IP = Innings pitched; W = Wins; L = Losses; ERA = Earned run average; SO = Strikeouts

Player	G	IP	W	L	ERA	SO
Woody Williams	33	208.1	12	12	4.41	137
Andy Ashby	31	206.0	14	10	3.80	132
Sterling Hitchcock	33	205.2	12	14	4.11	194
Matt Clement	31	180.2	10	12	4.48	135
Stan Spencer	9	38.1	0	7	9.16	36
Buddy Carlyle	7	37.2	1	3	5.97	29

==== Other pitchers ====
Note: G = Games pitched; IP = Innings pitched; W = Wins; L = Losses; ERA = Earned run average; SO = Strikeouts

Player	G	IP	W	L	ERA	SO
Brian Boehringer	33	94.1	6	5	3.24	64
Heath Murray	22	50.0	0	4	5.76	25

==== Relief pitchers ====
Note: G = Games pitched; W = Wins; L = Losses; SV = Saves; ERA = Earned run average; SO = Strikeouts

Player	G	W	L	SV	ERA	SO
Trevor Hoffman	64	2	3	40	2.14	73
Dan Miceli	66	4	5	2	4.46	59
Carlos Reyes	65	2	4	1	3.72	57
Donne Wall	55	7	4	0	3.07	53
Carlos Almanzar	28	0	0	0	7.47	30
Will Cunnane	24	2	1	0	5.23	22
Matt Whisenant	19	0	1	0	3.68	10
Ed Vosberg	15	0	0	0	9.72	6
Roberto Rivera	12	1	2	0	3.86	3
Matt Whiteside	10	1	0	0	13.91	9
Domingo Guzmán	7	0	1	0	21.60	4
Ed Giovanola	1	0	0	0	0.00	0

== Award winners ==
- Tony Gwynn, Outfield, Roberto Clemente Award

1999 Major League Baseball All-Star Game

- Tony Gwynn
- Andy Ashby
- Trevor Hoffman

== Farm system ==
Level	Team	League	Manager
AAA	Las Vegas Stars	Pacific Coast League	Mike Ramsey
AA	Mobile BayBears	Southern League	Mike Basso
A	Rancho Cucamonga Quakes	California League	Tom LeVasseur
A	Fort Wayne Wizards	Midwest League	Dan Simonds
Rookie	AZL Padres	Arizona League	Randy Whisler
Rookie	Idaho Falls Braves	Pioneer League	Don Werner
