= 1999 San Francisco Giants season =

1999 San Francisco Giants
- League: National League
- Division: West
- Ballpark: 3Com Park at Candlestick Point
- City: San Francisco, California
- Record: 86–76 (.531)
- Divisional place: 2nd
- Owners: Peter Magowan
- General managers: Brian Sabean
- Managers: Dusty Baker
- Television: KTVU (Mike Krukow, Duane Kuiper, Lon Simmons, Ted Robinson, Jon Miller); Fox Sports Bay Area (Mike Krukow, Duane Kuiper)
- Radio: KNBR (Mike Krukow, Duane Kuiper, Lon Simmons, Ted Robinson, Jon Miller ) KZSF (Erwin Higueros, Rene De La Rosa, Amaury Pi-Gonzalez)

The 1999 San Francisco Giants season was the Giants' 117th season in Major League Baseball, their 42nd season in San Francisco since their move from New York following the 1957 season, and their 40th and final season at 3Com Park at Candlestick Point. The team finished in second place in the National League West with an 86–76 record, 14 games behind the Arizona Diamondbacks.

== Offseason ==
- November 10, 1998: Dante Powell was traded by the San Francisco Giants to the Arizona Diamondbacks for Alan Embree.
- January 15, 1999: Jalal Leach was signed as a free agent with the San Francisco Giants.

== Regular season ==
=== Opening Day starters ===
- Rich Aurilia
- Marvin Benard
- Barry Bonds
- Ellis Burks
- Mark Gardner
- Jeff Kent
- Brent Mayne
- Bill Mueller
- J. T. Snow

=== Season standings ===
NL West
Team	W	L	Pct.	GB	Home	Road
Arizona Diamondbacks	100	62	.617	—	52‍–‍29	48‍–‍33
San Francisco Giants	86	76	.531	14	49‍–‍32	37‍–‍44
Los Angeles Dodgers	77	85	.475	23	37‍–‍44	40‍–‍41
San Diego Padres	74	88	.457	26	46‍–‍35	28‍–‍53
Colorado Rockies	72	90	.444	28	39‍–‍42	33‍–‍48

=== Record vs. opponents ===
1999 National League record Source: MLB Standings Grid – 1999
Team	AZ	ATL	CHC	CIN	COL	FLA	HOU	LAD	MIL	MON	NYM	PHI	PIT	SD	SF	STL	AL
Arizona	—	4–5	7–2	1–8	6–7	8–1	5–4	7–6	5–4	6–3	7–2	8–1	5–2	11–2	9–3	4–4	7–8
Atlanta	5–4	—	2–5	8–1	5–4	9–4	6–1	5–4	5–2	9–4	9–3	8–5	6–3	5–4	4–5	8–1	9–9
Chicago	2–7	5–2	—	5–8	4–5	6–3	3–9	2–7	6–6	2–5	3–6	2–7	7–6	6–3	1–7	7–5	6–9
Cincinnati	8–1	1–8	8–5	—	7–2	6–1	9–4	4–3	6–6	4–3	5–5	6–3	7–6	6–3	4–5	8–4	7–8
Colorado	7–6	4–5	5–4	2–7	—	5–4	2–6	8–5	6–3	6–3	4–5	5–4	2–7	4–9	4–9	4–5	4–8
Florida	1–8	4–9	3–6	1–6	4–5	—	2–7	7–2	5–4	8–4	3–10	2–11	3–4	3–6	4–5	3–4	11–7
Houston	4–5	1–6	9–3	4–9	6–2	7–2	—	6–3	8–5	7–2	4–5	6–1	5–7	8–1	5–4	5–7	12–3
Los Angeles	6–7	4–5	7–2	3–4	5–8	2–7	3–6	—	7–2	5–4	4–4	6–3	3–6	3–9	8–5	3–6	8–7
Milwaukee	4–5	2–5	6–6	6–6	3–6	4–5	5–8	2–7	—	5–4	2–5	5–4	8–4	3–5	4–5	7–6	8–6
Montreal	3–6	4–9	5–2	3–4	3–6	4–8	2–7	4–5	4–5	—	5–8	6–6	3–6	5–3	4–5	5–4	8–10
New York	2–7	3–9	6–3	5–5	5–4	10–3	5–4	4–4	5–2	8–5	—	6–6	7–2	7–2	7–2	5–2	12–6
Philadelphia	1–8	5–8	7–2	3–6	4–5	11–2	1–6	3–6	4–5	6–6	6–6	—	3–4	6–3	2–6	4–5	11–7
Pittsburgh	2–5	3–6	6–7	6–7	7–2	4–3	7–5	6–3	4–8	6–3	2–7	4–3	—	3–6	4–5	7–5	7–8
San Diego	2–11	4–5	3–6	3–6	9–4	6–3	1–8	9–3	5–3	3–5	2–7	3–6	6–3	—	5–7	2–7	11–4
San Francisco	3–9	5–4	7–1	5–4	9–4	5–4	4–5	5–8	5–4	5–4	2–7	6–2	5–4	7–5	—	6–3	7–8
St. Louis	4–4	1–8	5–7	4–8	5–4	4–3	7–5	6–3	6–7	4–5	2–5	5–4	5–7	7–2	3–6	—	7–8

=== Notable transactions ===
- April 27, 1999: Felipe Crespo was signed as a free agent with the San Francisco Giants.

=== Roster ===
1999 San Francisco Giants
Roster
Pitchers: 45 Chris Brock; 37 Miguel del Toro; 56 Alan Embree; 55 Shawn Estes; 26 Mark Gardner; 61 Liván Hernández; 49 John Johnstone; 36 Joe Nathan; 31 Robb Nen; 48 Russ Ortiz; 39 Bronswell Patrick; 47 Félix Rodríguez; 33 Rich Rodriguez; 46 Kirk Rueter; 43 Jerry Spradlin; 52 Julián Tavárez	Catchers: 9 Brent Mayne; 19 Doug Mirabelli; 29 Scott Servais; Infielders: 35 Rich Aurilia; 18 Jay Canizaro; 62 Wilson Delgado; 2 Edwards Guzman; 13 Charlie Hayes; 21 Jeff Kent; 34 Ramón Martínez; 32 Bill Mueller; 6 J. T. Snow	Outfielders: 7 Marvin Benard; 25 Barry Bonds; 23 Ellis Burks; 28 Stan Javier; 8 Calvin Murray; 1 Armando Ríos; 14 F.P. Santangelo	Manager: 12 Dusty Baker; Coaches: 17 Carlos Alfonso (first base); 20 Gene Clines (hitting); 15 Sonny Jackson (third base); 59 Juan Lopez (bullpen); 16 Ron Perranoski (pitching); 10 Ron Wotus (bench)

== Player stats ==
=== Batting ===
Note: Pos = Position; G = Games played; AB = At bats; H = Hits; Avg. = Batting average; HR = Home runs; RBI = Runs batted in

Pos	Player	G	AB	H	Avg.	HR	RBI
C	Brent Mayne	117	322	97	.301	2	39
1B	J.T. Snow	161	570	156	.274	24	98
2B	Jeff Kent	138	511	148	.290	23	101
SS	Rich Aurilia	152	558	157	.281	22	80
3B	Bill Mueller	116	414	120	.290	2	36
LF	Barry Bonds	102	355	93	.262	34	83
CF	Marvin Benard	149	562	163	.290	16	64
RF	Ellis Burks	120	390	110	.282	31	96

==== Other batters ====
Note: G = Games played; AB = At bats; H = Hits; Avg. = Batting average; HR = Home runs; RBI = Runs batted in

Player	G	AB	H	Avg.	HR	RBI
Stan Javier	112	333	92	.276	3	30
Charlie Hayes	95	264	54	.205	6	48
F.P. Santangelo	113	254	66	.260	3	26
Scott Servais	69	198	54	.273	5	21
Armando Ríos	72	150	49	.327	7	29
Ramón Martínez	61	144	38	.264	5	19
Doug Mirabelli	33	87	22	.253	1	10
Wilson Delgado	35	71	18	.254	0	3
Calvin Murray	15	19	5	.263	0	5
Jay Canizaro	12	18	8	.444	1	9
Edwards Guzmán	14	15	0	.000	0	0

=== Starting pitchers ===
Note: G = Games pitched; IP = Innings pitched; W = Wins; L = Losses; ERA = Earned run average; SO = Strikeouts

Player	G	IP	W	L	ERA	SO
Russ Ortiz	33	207.2	18	9	3.81	164
Shawn Estes	32	203.0	11	11	4.92	159
Kirk Rueter	33	184.2	15	10	5.41	94
Chris Brock	19	106.2	6	8	5.48	76
Liván Hernández	10	63.2	3	3	4.38	47

==== Other pitchers ====
Note: G = Games pitched; IP = Innings pitched; W = Wins; L = Losses; ERA = Earned run average; SO = Strikeouts

Player	G	IP	W	L	ERA	SO
Mark Gardner	29	139.0	5	11	6.47	86
Joe Nathan	19	90.1	7	4	4.18	54

===== Relief pitchers =====
Note: G = Games pitched; W = Wins; L = Losses; SV = Saves; ERA = Earned run average; SO = Strikeouts

Player	G	W	L	SV	ERA	SO
Robb Nen	72	3	8	37	3.98	77
Alan Embree	68	3	2	0	3.38	53
John Johnstone	62	4	6	3	2.60	56
Rich Rodriguez	62	3	0	0	5.24	44
Jerry Spradlin	59	3	1	0	4.19	52
Félix Rodríguez	47	2	3	0	3.80	55
Julián Tavárez	47	2	0	0	5.93	33
Miguel Del Toro	14	0	0	0	4.18	20
Bronswell Patrick	6	1	0	1	10.13	6

== Award winners ==
- Marvin Benard CF, Willie Mac Award

All-Star Game

== Farm system ==
Level	Team	League	Manager
AAA	Fresno Grizzlies	Pacific Coast League	Ron Roenicke
AA	Shreveport Captains	Texas League	Shane Turner
A	Bakersfield Blaze	California League	Keith Comstock
A	San Jose Giants	California League	Lenn Sakata
A-Short Season	Salem-Keizer Volcanoes	Northwest League	Frank Reberger
