= Rocky Coppinger =

American baseball player (born 1974)

- Pitcher
- Born: March 19, 1974 (age 52); El Paso, Texas, U.S.
- Batted: Right Threw: Right

MLB debut
- June 11, 1996, for the Baltimore Orioles

Last MLB appearance
- October 4, 2001, for the Milwaukee Brewers

MLB statistics
- Win–loss record: 17–11
- Earned run average: 5.47
- Strikeouts: 210
- Stats at Baseball Reference

Teams
- Baltimore Orioles (1996–1999); Milwaukee Brewers (1999, 2001)

John Thomas Coppinger (born March 19, 1974) is an American former professional baseball pitcher. He played in Major League Baseball (MLB) from 1996 through 2001 for the Baltimore Orioles and Milwaukee Brewers. He attended high school at Coronado High School in El Paso, Texas and graduated in 1993. He is also known for surrendering Mark McGwire's 583rd home run, which was the last home run of McGwire's career.

Coppinger was traded from the Orioles to the Brewers on July 16, 1999, in a transaction that was completed five days later on July 21 when Al Reyes was sent to Baltimore.
