= 1999 Pittsburgh Pirates season =

1999 Pittsburgh Pirates
- League: National League
- Division: Central
- Ballpark: Three Rivers Stadium
- City: Pittsburgh, Pennsylvania
- Record: 78–83 (.484)
- Divisional place: 3rd
- Owners: Kevin McClatchy
- General managers: Cam Bonifay
- Managers: Gene Lamont
- Television: WPGH-TV & WCWB-TV; Fox Sports Net Pittsburgh
- Radio: KDKA-AM (Steve Blass, Greg Brown, Lanny Frattare, Bob Walk)

The 1999 Pittsburgh Pirates season was the 118th season of the franchise; the 113th in the National League. This was their 30th season at Three Rivers Stadium. The Pirates finished third in the National League Central with a record of 78–83.

== Offseason ==
- October 15, 1998: Chance Sanford was released by the Pittsburgh Pirates.
- November 17, 1998: Mike Benjamin was signed as a free agent by the Pirates.
- November 18, 1998: Ricardo Rincón was traded by the Pirates to the Cleveland Indians for Brian Giles.
- December 22, 1998: Rafael Bournigal was signed as a free agent by the Pirates.
- March 27, 1999: Rafael Bournigal was released by the Pittsburgh Pirates.
- March 31, 1999: Elmer Dessens was released by the Pirates.

== Regular season ==
=== Season standings ===
NL Central
Team	W	L	Pct.	GB	Home	Road
Houston Astros	97	65	.599	—	50‍–‍32	47‍–‍33
Cincinnati Reds	96	67	.589	1½	45‍–‍37	51‍–‍30
Pittsburgh Pirates	78	83	.484	18½	45‍–‍36	33‍–‍47
St. Louis Cardinals	75	86	.466	21½	38‍–‍42	37‍–‍44
Milwaukee Brewers	74	87	.460	22½	32‍–‍48	42‍–‍39
Chicago Cubs	67	95	.414	30	34‍–‍47	33‍–‍48

=== Game log ===
1999 Game Log: 78–83 (Home: 45–36; Away: 33–47)
April: 9–12 (Home: 4–8; Away: 5–4)

#	Date	Opponent	Score	Win	Loss	Save	Attendance	Record
1	April 5	Expos	2–9	Hermanson	**Cordova** (0–1)	—	43,405	0–1
2	April 6	Expos	8–2	**Schmidt** (1–0)	Pavano	—	10,051	1–1
3	April 7	Expos	3–4	Urbina	**Loiselle** (0–1)	—	11,377	1–2
4	April 9	Cubs	2–1	**Benson** (1–0)	Sanders	**Williams** (1)	19,721	2–2
5	April 10	Cubs	9–3	**Sauerbeck** (1–0)	Woodall	—	22,479	3–2
6	April 11	Cubs	9–6	**Schmidt** (2–0)	Trachsel	—	19,384	4–2
7	April 13	Cardinals	2–4	Bottenfield	**Schourek** (0–1)	Acevedo	19,724	4–3
8	April 14	Cardinals	5–9	Aybar	**Benson** (1–1)	—	18,780	4–4
	April 15	Cardinals	Postponed (rain) Rescheduled for August 6					4–4
9	April 16	@ Reds	5–6	Graves	**Christiansen** (0–1)	—	17,974	4–5
10	April 17	@ Reds	7–6 (10)	**Christiansen** (1–1)	White	—	15,697	5–5
11	April 18	@ Reds	4–2	**Loiselle** (1–1)	Graves	**Williams** (2)	16,667	6–5
12	April 19	@ Padres	3–0	**Schourek** (1–1)	Spencer	**Christiansen** (1)	33,616	7–5
13	April 20	@ Padres	7–3 (10)	**Williams** (1–0)	Hoffman	—	15,439	8–5
14	April 21	@ Padres	0–2	Ashby	**Schmidt** (2–1)	Hoffman	13,928	8–6
15	April 23	Brewers	1–9	Woodard	**Peters** (0–1)	—	13,850	8–7
16	April 24	Brewers	3–5	Reyes	**Ritchie** (0–1)	Wickman	15,809	8–8
17	April 25	Brewers	2–4	Karl	**Benson** (1–2)	Wickman	17,268	8–9
18	April 27	@ Braves	5–3	**Schmidt** (3–1)	Perez	**Williams** (3)	26,990	9–9
19	April 28	@ Braves	4–5	Glavine	**Christiansen** (1–2)	—	29,615	9–10
20	April 29	@ Braves	1–8	Maddux	**Silva** (0–1)	—	32,017	9–11
21	April 30	Rockies	2–7	Astacio	**Schourek** (1–2)	—	17,466	9–12

May: 17–12 (Home: 12–3; Away: 5–9)

#	Date	Opponent	Score	Win	Loss	Save	Attendance	Record
22	May 1	Rockies	9–3	**Ritchie** (1–1)	Wright	—	18,599	10–12
23	May 2	Rockies	8–5	**Schmidt** (4–1)	Thomson	**Williams** (4)	19,215	11–12
24	May 3	Giants	9–8	**Loiselle** (2–1)	Nen	—	11,099	12–12
25	May 4	Giants	4–7	Ortiz	**Silva** (0–2)	—	10,532	12–13
26	May 5	Giants	4–3 (12)	**Loiselle** (3–1)	Rodriguez	—	14,358	13–13
27	May 6	@ Cardinals	13–3	**Ritchie** (2–1)	Osborne	—	36,615	14–13
28	May 7	@ Cardinals	2–4	Radinsky	**Loiselle** (3–2)	—	39,620	14–14
29	May 8	@ Cardinals	7–0	**Benson** (2–2)	Jimenez	—	45,790	15–14
30	May 9	@ Cardinals	12–9	**Peters** (1–1)	Aybar	**Williams** (5)	45,458	16–14
31	May 10	@ Astros	0–6	Hampton	**Schourek** (1–3)	—	17,064	16–15
32	May 11	@ Astros	8–19	Bergman	**Ritchie** (2–2)	—	18,450	16–16
33	May 12	@ Astros	2–6	Lima	**Schmidt** (4–2)	—	19,792	16–17
34	May 14	Expos	5–3	**Benson** (3–2)	Hermanson	**Williams** (6)	24,644	17–17
35	May 15	Expos	17–6	**Silva** (1–2)	Pavano	—	27,017	18–17
36	May 16	Expos	9–4	**Schourek** (2–3)	Vazquez	—	28,882	19–17
37	May 17	@ Braves	1–2	Millwood	**Ritchie** (2–3)	Rocker	30,673	19–18
38	May 18	@ Braves	4–12	Perez	**Schmidt** (4–3)	—	30,858	19–19
39	May 19	@ Braves	3–7	Glavine	**Cordova** (0–2)	—	34,106	19–20
40	May 20	@ Marlins	3–4 (14)	Alfonseca	**Williams** (1–1)	—	11,473	19–21
41	May 21	@ Marlins	1–8	Hernandez	**Schourek** (2–4)	—	16,782	19–22
42	May 22	@ Marlins	11–4	**Ritchie** (3–3)	Springer	—	23,121	20–22
43	May 23	@ Marlins	6–5	**Wallace** (1–0)	Darensbourg	**Williams** (7)	19,321	21–22
44	May 24	Mets	7–4	**Silva** (2–2)	Isringhausen	**Williams** (8)	11,880	22–22
45	May 25	Mets	3–8	Yoshii	**Benson** (3–3)	—	12,029	22–23
46	May 26	Mets	2–5	Hershiser	**Schourek** (2–5)	Franco	13,681	22–24
47	May 28	Astros	6–5	**Ritchie** (4–3)	Lima	**Williams** (9)	17,309	23–24
48	May 29	Astros	5–1	**Cordova** (1–2)	Reynolds	—	32,426	24–24
49	May 30	Astros	7–3	**Benson** (4–3)	Hampton	—	28,905	25–24
50	May 31	Dodgers	5–4	**Wilkins** (1–0)	Arnold	**Williams** (10)	15,924	26–24

June: 13–13 (Home: 6–2; Away: 7–11)

#	Date	Opponent	Score	Win	Loss	Save	Attendance	Record
51	June 1	Dodgers	4–2	**Schmidt** (5–3)	Valdez	**Williams** (11)	10,962	27–24
52	June 2	Dodgers	8–4	**Ritchie** (5–3)	Dreifort	—	20,807	28–24
53	June 4	@ White Sox	6–3 (11)	**Wilkins** (2–0)	Simas	—	12,238	29–24
54	June 5	@ White Sox	5–6	Parque	**Benson** (4–4)	Foulke	20,066	29–25
55	June 6	@ White Sox	3–4	Sirotka	**Silva** (2–3)	Howry	26,827	29–26
56	June 7	@ Tigers	4–9	Brunson	**Schmidt** (5–4)	—	14,280	29–27
57	June 8	@ Tigers	4–11	Cruz	**Ritchie** (5–4)	—	15,270	29–28
58	June 9	@ Tigers	15–3	**Cordova** (2–2)	Moehler	—	15,747	30–28
59	June 11	Royals	3–10	Rosado	**Benson** (4–5)	—	31,052	30–29
60	June 12	Royals	9–8	**Christiansen** (2–2)	Whisenant	—	29,569	31–29
61	June 13	Royals	8–4	**Schmidt** (6–4)	Whisenant	**Williams** (12)	28,261	32–29
62	June 15	@ Dodgers	11–1	**Ritchie** (6–4)	Brown	—	26,284	33–29
63	June 16	@ Dodgers	5–6	Borbon	**Clontz** (0–1)	Shaw	25,384	33–30
64	June 17	@ Dodgers	8–3	**Benson** (5–5)	Park	—	30,888	34–30
65	June 18	@ Padres	2–4	Boehringer	**Silva** (2–4)	Hoffman	60,799	34–31
66	June 19	@ Padres	4–5	Cunnane	**Schmidt** (6–5)	Hoffman	33,803	34–32
67	June 20	@ Padres	3–6	Clement	**Ritchie** (6–5)	Hoffman	25,819	34–33
68	June 22	@ Phillies	2–3	Wolf	**Cordova** (2–3)	Gomes	18,835	34–34
69	June 23	@ Phillies	8–6	**Benson** (6–5)	Byrd	**Williams** (13)	20,256	35–34
70	June 24	@ Phillies	5–7	Schilling	**Silva** (2–5)	Gomes	25,848	35–35
71	June 25	@ Brewers	5–3	**Schmidt** (7–5)	Abbott	**Christiansen** (2)	23,958	36–35
72	June 26	@ Brewers	4–7	Nomo	**Ritchie** (6–6)	Wickman	26,590	36–36
73	June 27	@ Brewers	6–5	**Cordova** (3–3)	Karl	**Christiansen** (3)	23,788	37–36
74	June 28	Phillies	3–2 (10)	**Hansell** (1–0)	Montgomery	—	14,144	38–36
75	June 29	Phillies	4–7	Schilling	**Silva** (2–6)	—	16,343	38–37
76	June 30	Phillies	9–1	**Schmidt** (8–5)	Ogea	—	14,526	39–37

July: 11–16 (Home: 7–9; Away: 4–7)

#	Date	Opponent	Score	Win	Loss	Save	Attendance	Record
77	July 1	Phillies	12–7	**Ritchie** (7–6)	Person	—	11,174	40–37
78	July 2	Brewers	2–5	Karl	**Cordova** (3–4)	Wickman	20,332	40–38
79	July 3	Brewers	4–9	Pulsipher	**Benson** (6–6)	—	28,893	40–39
80	July 4	Brewers	3–4	Weathers	**Clontz** (0–2)	Wickman	16,553	40–40
81	July 5	Cubs	2–5	Lieber	**Schmidt** (8–6)	Aguilera	19,762	40–41
82	July 6	Cubs	6–1	**Ritchie** (8–6)	Trachsel	—	14,367	41–41
83	July 7	Cubs	4–1	**Cordova** (4–4)	Mulholland	—	28,258	42–41
84	July 8	Cubs	4–9	Serafini	**Benson** (6–7)	Sanders	17,711	42–42
85	July 9	@ Twins	4–5	Radke	**Silva** (2–7)	Trombley	13,427	42–43
86	July 10	@ Twins	4–5	Guardado	**Williams** (1–2)	—	14,865	42–44
87	July 11	@ Twins	10–2	**Ritchie** (9–6)	Mays	—	18,587	43–44
88	July 15	Indians	0–2	Colon	**Schmidt** (8–7)	Jackson	39,620	43–45
89	July 16	Indians	11–3	**Cordova** (5–4)	Burba	—	43,519	44–45
90	July 17	Indians	13–10	**Benson** (7–7)	Nagy	**Williams** (14)	43,299	45–45
91	July 18	Dodgers	6–5 (10)	**Sauerbeck** (2–0)	Mills	—	23,855	46–45
92	July 19	Dodgers	7–12	Dreifort	**Silva** (2–8)	—	14,805	46–46
93	July 20	Dodgers	4–8	Brown	**Clontz** (0–3)	—	16,921	46–47
94	July 21	@ Cubs	1–2	Aguilera	**Christiansen** (2–3)	—	37,006	46–48
95	July 22	@ Cubs	3–5	Mulholland	**Benson** (7–8)	Adams	37,112	46–49
96	July 23	@ Expos	1–5	Vazquez	**Ritchie** (9–7)	—	7,510	46–50
97	July 24	@ Expos	7–2	**Schourek** (3–5)	Powell	—	13,396	47–50
98	July 25	@ Expos	6–1	**Schmidt** (9–7)	Kline	—	12,244	48–50
99	July 26	@ Mets	5–7	Reed	**Cordova** (5–5)	Wendell	32,010	48–51
100	July 27	@ Mets	5–1	**Benson** (8–8)	Hershiser	—	36,337	49–51
101	July 28	@ Mets	2–9	Cook	**Wilkins** (2–1)	—	42,920	49–52
102	July 30	Marlins	7–8	Edmondson	**Hansell** (1–1)	Alfonseca	25,163	49–53
103	July 31	Marlins	4–2	**Schmidt** (10–7)	Edmondson	**Williams** (15)	33,862	50–53

August: 16–14 (Home: 10–8; Away: 6–6)

#	Date	Opponent	Score	Win	Loss	Save	Attendance	Record
104	August 1	Marlins	2–1	**Cordova** (6–5)	Fernandez	—	19,071	51–53
105	August 3	Braves	7–1	**Benson** (9–8)	Millwood	—	17,154	52–53
106	August 4	Braves	3–2	**Ritchie** (10–7)	Smoltz	**Williams** (16)	17,625	53–53
107	August 5	Braves	3–6	Remlinger	**Hansell** (1–2)	Rocker	19,078	53–54
108	August 6	Cardinals	5–1	**Anderson** (1–0)	Jimenez	**Silva** (1)	—	54–54
109	August 6	Cardinals	1–5	Stephenson	**Schmidt** (10–8)	Croushore	35,521	54–55
110	August 7	Cardinals	3–1	**Cordova** (7–5)	Bottenfield	**Williams** (17)	41,063	55–55
111	August 8	Cardinals	5–1	**Benson** (10–8)	Oliver	—	31,780	56–55
112	August 9	Reds	2–4	Neagle	**Ritchie** (10–8)	Williamson	13,423	56–56
113	August 10	Reds	1–6	Guzman	**Schourek** (3–6)	—	13,306	56–57
114	August 11	Reds	5–4	**Williams** (2–2)	Williamson	—	23,728	57–57
115	August 13	@ Astros	6–5 (13)	**Clontz** (1–3)	Miller	**Williams** (18)	39,829	58–57
116	August 14	@ Astros	1–7	Holt	**Benson** (10–9)	—	44,868	58–58
117	August 15	@ Astros	2–0	**Ritchie** (11–8)	Reynolds	**Williams** (19)	36,231	59–58
118	August 16	@ Reds	2–9	Guzman	**Schourek** (3–7)	—	19,693	59–59
119	August 17	@ Reds	4–7 (12)	Graves	**Williams** (2–3)	—	19,118	59–60
120	August 18	@ Reds	12–6	**Cordova** (8–5)	Tomko	—	19,733	60–60
121	August 19	@ Reds	0–1	Harnisch	**Benson** (10–10)	Williamson	17,904	60–61
122	August 20	Diamondbacks	5–4	**Ritchie** (12–8)	Stottlemyre	**Williams** (20)	23,934	61–61
123	August 21	Diamondbacks	2–4	Johnson	**Anderson** (1–1)	—	31,364	61–62
124	August 22	Diamondbacks	5–7	Daal	**Schmidt** (10–9)	Mantei	25,112	61–63
125	August 23	Diamondbacks	1–2	Reynoso	**Cordova** (8–6)	Mantei	11,768	61–64
126	August 24	Rockies	2–3	Leskanic	**Williams** (2–4)	Veres	13,221	61–65
127	August 25	Rockies	9–3	**Peters** (2–1)	Kile	—	12,535	62–65
128	August 26	Rockies	8–4	**Anderson** (2–1)	Astacio	—	12,649	63–65
129	August 27	@ Giants	4–1	**Schmidt** (11–9)	Nathan	**Williams** (21)	16,390	64–65
130	August 28	@ Giants	2–6	Gardner	**Cordova** (8–7)	—	32,783	64–66
131	August 29	@ Giants	3–5	Estes	**Benson** (10–11)	Nen	34,020	64–67
132	August 30	@ Rockies	11–8	**Peters** (3–1)	Ramirez	**Williams** (22)	41,872	65–67
133	August 31	@ Rockies	9–8 (10)	**Williams** (3–4)	Lee	**Silva** (2)	41,729	66–67

September: 12–13 (Home: 6–6; Away: 6–7)

#	Date	Opponent	Score	Win	Loss	Save	Attendance	Record
134	September 1	@ Rockies	9–8	**Sauerbeck** (3–0)	Veres	**Clontz** (1)	40,529	67–67
135	September 3	Giants	2–12	Estes	**Cordova** (8–8)	—	16,478	67–68
136	September 4	Giants	2–9	Ortiz	**Benson** (10–12)	—	19,949	67–69
137	September 5	Giants	8–4	**Peters** (4–1)	Rueter	—	17,901	68–69
138	September 6	Padres	3–4	Ashby	**Ritchie** (12–9)	Hoffman	16,663	68–70
139	September 7	Padres	3–1	**Schmidt** (12–9)	Hitchcock	**Silva** (3)	11,058	69–70
140	September 8	Padres	4–7 (10)	Hoffman	**Wilkins** (2–2)	—	10,133	69–71
141	September 10	@ Cardinals	5–11	Bottenfield	**Benson** (10–13)	—	36,590	69–72
142	September 11	@ Cardinals	8–5	**Peters** (5–1)	Jimenez	**Silva** (4)	46,011	70–72
	September 12	@ Cardinals	Cancelled (rain)					70–72
143	September 13	@ Diamondbacks	1–5	Daal	**Schmidt** (12–10)	Chouinard	32,147	70–73
144	September 14	@ Diamondbacks	1–2	Swindell	**Wilkins** (2–3)	Mantei	30,372	70–74
145	September 15	@ Diamondbacks	5–1	**Benson** (11–13)	Reynoso	—	31,294	71–74
146	September 17	Reds	3–1	**Ritchie** (13–9)	Villone	**Sauerbeck** (1)	21,853	72–74
147	September 18	Reds	0–3	Parris	**Peters** (5–2)	—	21,253	72–75
148	September 19	Reds	8–5	**Schmidt** (13–10)	Harnisch	**Clontz** (2)	21,183	73–75
149	September 20	Astros	11–5	**Schourek** (4–7)	Reynolds	—	10,256	74–75
150	September 21	Astros	3–6	Elarton	**Benson** (11–14)	Henry	12,745	74–76
151	September 22	Astros	3–2	**Ritchie** (14–9)	Lima	—	16,647	75–76
152	September 23	@ Cubs	5–8	Bowie	**Peters** (5–3)	Aguilera	36,736	75–77
153	September 24	@ Cubs	0–9	Farnsworth	**Schmidt** (13–11)	—	29,267	75–78
154	September 25	@ Cubs	1–3	Lieber	**Cordova** (8–9)	—	39,035	75–79
155	September 26	@ Cubs	8–4 (11)	**Sauerbeck** (4–0)	Guthrie	—	39,663	76–79
	September 28	@ Brewers	Postponed (rain) Rescheduled for September 29					76–79
156	September 29	@ Brewers	7–5	**Ritchie** (15–9)	Woodard	**Williams** (23)	—	77–79
157	September 29	@ Brewers	2–5	Bere	**Peters** (5–4)	Wickman	12,464	77–80
158	September 30	@ Brewers	3–2	**Garcia** (1–0)	Nomo	**Sauerbeck** (2)	12,319	78–80

October: 0–3 (Home: 0–0; Away: 0–3)

#	Date	Opponent	Score	Win	Loss	Save	Attendance	Record
159	October 1	@ Mets	2–3 (11)	Mahomes	**Sauerbeck** (4–1)	—	29,528	78–81
160	October 2	@ Mets	0–7	Reed	**Cordova** (8–10)	—	36,878	78–82
161	October 3	@ Mets	1–2	Benitez	**Hansell** (1–3)	—	50,111	78–83

Legend: = Win = Loss
Bold = Pittsburgh Pirates team member

=== Record vs. opponents ===
1999 National League record Source: MLB Standings Grid – 1999
Team	AZ	ATL	CHC	CIN	COL	FLA	HOU	LAD	MIL	MON	NYM	PHI	PIT	SD	SF	STL	AL
Arizona	—	4–5	7–2	1–8	6–7	8–1	5–4	7–6	5–4	6–3	7–2	8–1	5–2	11–2	9–3	4–4	7–8
Atlanta	5–4	—	2–5	8–1	5–4	9–4	6–1	5–4	5–2	9–4	9–3	8–5	6–3	5–4	4–5	8–1	9–9
Chicago	2–7	5–2	—	5–8	4–5	6–3	3–9	2–7	6–6	2–5	3–6	2–7	7–6	6–3	1–7	7–5	6–9
Cincinnati	8–1	1–8	8–5	—	7–2	6–1	9–4	4–3	6–6	4–3	5–5	6–3	7–6	6–3	4–5	8–4	7–8
Colorado	7–6	4–5	5–4	2–7	—	5–4	2–6	8–5	6–3	6–3	4–5	5–4	2–7	4–9	4–9	4–5	4–8
Florida	1–8	4–9	3–6	1–6	4–5	—	2–7	7–2	5–4	8–4	3–10	2–11	3–4	3–6	4–5	3–4	11–7
Houston	4–5	1–6	9–3	4–9	6–2	7–2	—	6–3	8–5	7–2	4–5	6–1	5–7	8–1	5–4	5–7	12–3
Los Angeles	6–7	4–5	7–2	3–4	5–8	2–7	3–6	—	7–2	5–4	4–4	6–3	3–6	3–9	8–5	3–6	8–7
Milwaukee	4–5	2–5	6–6	6–6	3–6	4–5	5–8	2–7	—	5–4	2–5	5–4	8–4	3–5	4–5	7–6	8–6
Montreal	3–6	4–9	5–2	3–4	3–6	4–8	2–7	4–5	4–5	—	5–8	6–6	3–6	5–3	4–5	5–4	8–10
New York	2–7	3–9	6–3	5–5	5–4	10–3	5–4	4–4	5–2	8–5	—	6–6	7–2	7–2	7–2	5–2	12–6
Philadelphia	1–8	5–8	7–2	3–6	4–5	11–2	1–6	3–6	4–5	6–6	6–6	—	3–4	6–3	2–6	4–5	11–7
Pittsburgh	2–5	3–6	6–7	6–7	7–2	4–3	7–5	6–3	4–8	6–3	2–7	4–3	—	3–6	4–5	7–5	7–8
San Diego	2–11	4–5	3–6	3–6	9–4	6–3	1–8	9–3	5–3	3–5	2–7	3–6	6–3	—	5–7	2–7	11–4
San Francisco	3–9	5–4	7–1	5–4	9–4	5–4	4–5	5–8	5–4	5–4	2–7	6–2	5–4	7–5	—	6–3	7–8
St. Louis	4–4	1–8	5–7	4–8	5–4	4–3	7–5	6–3	6–7	4–5	2–5	5–4	5–7	7–2	3–6	—	7–8

=== Detailed records ===
National League
Opponent	W	L	WP	RS	RA
NL East
Atlanta Braves	3	6	0.333	31	46
Florida Marlins	4	3	0.571	34	32
Montreal Expos	6	3	0.667	58	36
New York Mets	2	7	0.222	27	46
Philadelphia Phillies	4	3	0.571	43	33
Total	19	22	0.463	193	193
NL Central
Chicago Cubs	6	7	0.462	54	57
Cincinnati Reds	6	7	0.462	53	60
Houston Astros	7	5	0.583	54	65
Milwaukee Brewers	4	8	0.333	42	63
**Pittsburgh Pirates**					
St. Louis Cardinals	7	5	0.583	68	53
Total	30	32	0.484	271	298
NL West
Arizona Diamondbacks	2	5	0.286	20	25
Colorado Rockies	7	2	0.778	67	49
Los Angeles Dodgers	6	3	0.667	58	45
San Diego Padres	3	6	0.333	29	32
San Francisco Giants	4	5	0.444	38	55
Total	22	21	0.512	212	206
American League
Chicago White Sox	1	2	0.333	14	13
Cleveland Indians	2	1	0.667	24	15
Detroit Tigers	1	2	0.333	23	23
Kansas City Royals	2	1	0.667	20	22
Minnesota Twins	1	2	0.333	18	12
Total	7	8	0.467	99	85
Season Total	78	83	0.484	775	782

Month	Games	Won	Lost	Win %	RS	RA
April	21	9	12	0.429	84	98
May	29	17	12	0.586	173	158
June	26	13	13	0.500	148	130
July	27	11	16	0.407	137	135
August	30	16	14	0.533	125	122
September	25	12	13	0.480	105	127
October	3	0	3	0.000	3	12
Total	161	78	83	0.484	775	782

	Games	Won	Lost	Win %	RS	RA
Home	81	45	36	0.556	404	379
Away	80	33	47	0.413	371	403
Total	161	78	83	0.484	775	782

== Roster ==
1999 Pittsburgh Pirates
Roster
Pitchers: 55 Jimmy Anderson; 34 Kris Benson; 60 Jason Boyd; 41 Jason Christiansen; 59 Brad Clontz; 67 Francisco Córdova; 68 Jim Dougherty; 64 Mike Garcia; 57 Greg Hansell; 51 Rich Loiselle; 38 Chris Peters; 26 Jason Phillips; 48 Todd Ritchie; 47 Scott Sauerbeck; 22 Jason Schmidt; 46 Pete Schourek; 56 José Silva; 39 Jeff Wallace; 35 Marc Wilkins; 43 Mike Williams	Catchers: 31 Yamid Haad; 18 Jason Kendall; 63 Tim Laker; 17 Joe Oliver; 15 Keith Osik; 66 Chris Tremie; Infielders: 6 Mike Benjamin; 25 Iván Cruz; 2 Pat Meares; 30 Warren Morris; 10 Abraham Núñez; 16 Aramis Ramírez; 5 Ed Sprague Jr.; 11 Dale Sveum; 29 Kevin Young	Outfielders: 13 Adrian Brown; 37 Brant Brown; 19 Emil Brown; 14 Freddy García; 24 Brian Giles; 11 José Guillén; 3 Chad Hermansen; 28 Al Martin; 12 Turner Ward; 7 John Wehner	Manager: 32 Gene Lamont; Coaches: 70 Jeff Banister (bench); 37 Joe Jones (first base); 45 Jack Lind (third base); 23 Lloyd McClendon (hitting); 44 Rick Renick (bench); 50 Pete Vuckovich (pitching); 54 Spin Williams (bullpen)

=== Opening Day lineup ===
Opening Day Starters
#	Name	Position
18	Jason Kendall	C
30	Warren Morris	2B
24	Brian Giles	LF
29	Kevin Young	1B
37	Brant Brown	CF
5	Ed Sprague Jr.	3B
11	José Guillén	RF
6	Mike Benjamin	SS
67	Francisco Córdova	SP

== Player stats ==
Batting

Note: G = Games played; AB = At bats; H = Hits; Avg. = Batting average; HR = Home runs; RBI = Runs batted in

Regular season
Player	G	AB	H	Avg.	HR	RBI
I. Cruz	5	10	4	0.400	1	2
J. Anderson	13	9	3	0.333	0	1
T. Laker	6	9	3	0.333	0	0
J. Kendall	78	280	93	0.332	8	41
B. Giles	141	521	164	0.315	39	115
P. Meares	21	91	28	0.308	0	7
K. Young	156	584	174	0.298	26	106
W. Morris	147	511	147	0.288	15	73
A. Martin	143	541	150	0.277	24	63
C. Peters	19	22	6	0.273	0	1
A. Brown	115	226	61	0.270	4	17
E. Sprague	137	490	131	0.267	22	81
J. Guillén	40	120	32	0.267	1	18
M. Benjamin	110	368	91	0.247	1	37
C. Hermansen	19	60	14	0.233	1	1
B. Brown	130	341	79	0.232	16	58
M. Garcia	55	130	30	0.231	6	23
A. Núñez	90	259	57	0.220	0	17
D. Sveum	49	71	15	0.211	3	13
T. Ward	49	91	19	0.209	0	8
J. Oliver	45	134	27	0.201	1	13
K. Osik	66	167	31	0.186	2	13
J. Wehner	39	65	12	0.185	1	4
A. Ramírez	18	56	10	0.179	0	7
F. Córdova	25	49	8	0.163	0	2
K. Benson	30	65	10	0.154	0	7
T. Ritchie	27	53	8	0.151	0	1
E. Brown	6	14	2	0.143	0	0
J. Silva	32	20	2	0.100	0	3
J. Schmidt	31	60	5	0.083	0	1
C. Tremie	9	14	1	0.071	0	1
J. Boyd	4	1	0	0.000	0	0
J. Christiansen	36	1	0	0.000	0	0
B. Clontz	51	3	0	0.000	0	0
Y. Haad	1	1	0	0.000	0	0
G. Hansell	32	2	0	0.000	0	0
S. Sauerbeck	62	1	0	0.000	0	0
P. Schourek	28	25	0	0.000	0	1
M. Wilkins	44	1	0	0.000	0	0
M. Williams	55	2	0	0.000	0	0
J. Dougherty	2	0	0	—	0	0
F. García	7	0	0	—	0	0
R. Loiselle	13	0	0	—	0	0
J. Phillips	6	0	0	—	0	0
J. Wallace	39	0	0	—	0	0
Team totals	161	5,468	1,417	0.259	171	735

Pitching

Note: G = Games pitched; IP = Innings pitched; W = Wins; L = Losses; ERA = Earned run average; SO = Strikeouts

Regular season
Player	G	IP	W	L	ERA	SO
M. García	7	7	1	0	1.29	9
S. Sauerbeck	65	67 2/3	4	1	2.00	55
B. Clontz	56	49 1/3	1	3	2.74	40
J. Boyd	4	5 1/3	0	0	3.38	4
T. Ritchie	28	172 2/3	15	9	3.49	107
J. Wallace	41	39	1	0	3.69	41
G. Hansell	33	39 1/3	1	3	3.89	34
J. Anderson	13	29 1/3	2	1	3.99	13
J. Christiansen	39	37 2/3	2	3	4.06	35
K. Benson	31	196 2/3	11	14	4.07	139
J. Schmidt	33	212 2/3	13	11	4.19	148
M. Wilkins	46	51	2	3	4.24	44
F. Córdova	27	160 2/3	8	10	4.43	98
M. Williams	58	58 1/3	3	4	5.09	76
R. Loiselle	13	15 1/3	3	2	5.28	14
P. Schourek	30	113	4	7	5.34	94
J. Silva	34	97 1/3	2	8	5.73	77
C. Peters	19	71	5	4	6.59	46
J. Dougherty	2	2	0	0	9.00	1
J. Phillips	6	7	0	0	11.57	7
K. Osik	1	1	0	0	36.00	1
Team totals	161	1,433 1/3	78	83	4.33	1,083

== Awards and honors ==
1999 Major League Baseball All-Star Game

- Ed Sprague Jr., 3B, reserve

== Notable transactions ==
- May 17, 1999: Dale Sveum was signed as a free agent by the Pirates.
- July 23, 1999: José Guillén and Jeff Sparks were traded by the Pirates to the Tampa Bay Devil Rays for Joe Oliver and Humberto Cota.

== Farm system ==
Level	Team	League	Manager
AAA	Nashville Sounds	Pacific Coast League	Trent Jewett
AA	Altoona Curve	Eastern League	Marty Brown
A	Lynchburg Hillcats	Carolina League	Scott Little
A	Hickory Crawdads	South Atlantic League	Tracy Woodson
A-Short Season	Williamsport Crosscutters	New York–Penn League	Curtis Wilkerson
Rookie	GCL Pirates	Gulf Coast League	Woody Huyke
