= Ryan Christenson =

American baseball player & coach (born 1974)

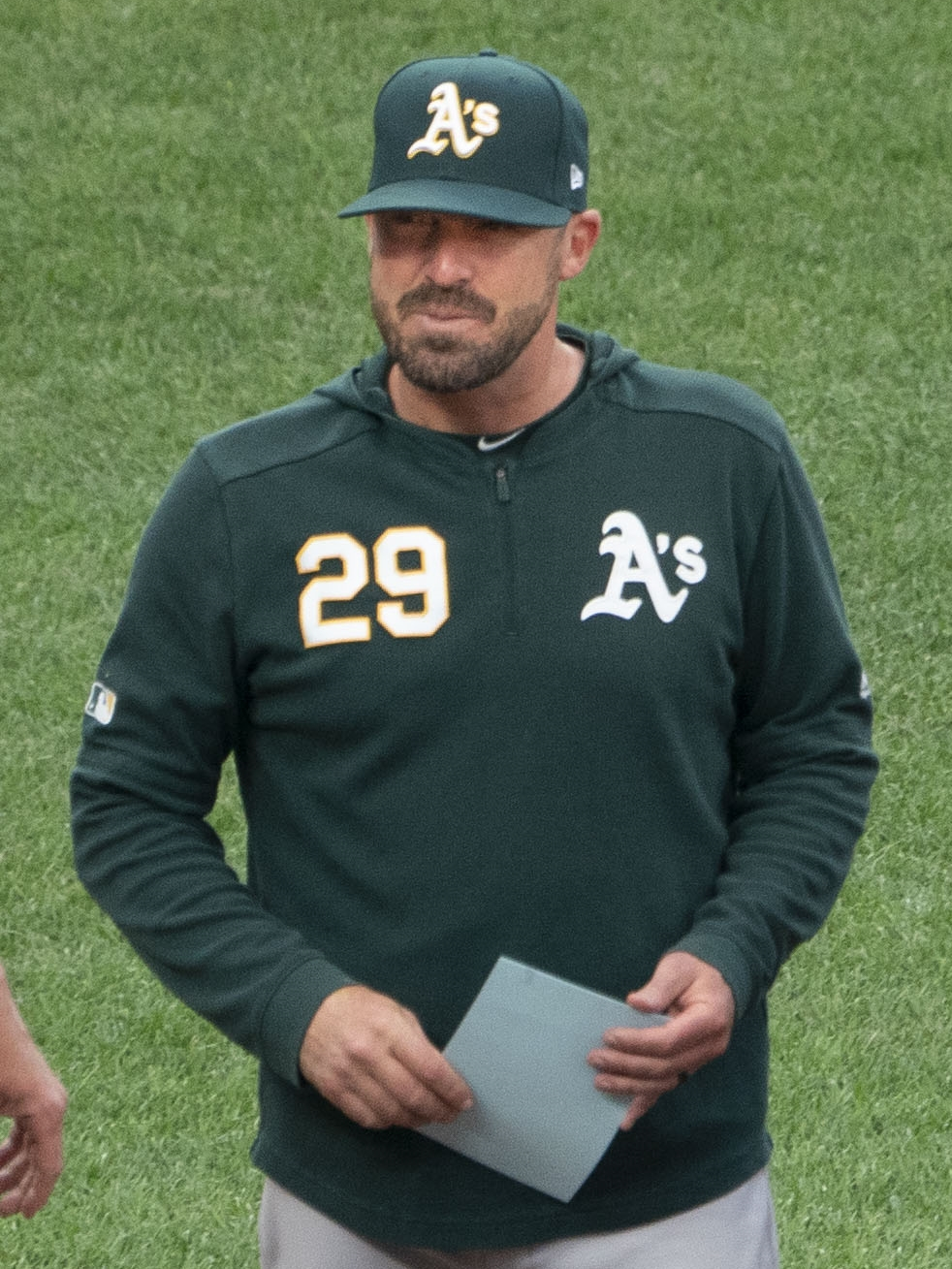
- Christenson with the Oakland Athletics in 2019

Athletics – No. 28
- Outfielder / Coach
- Born: March 28, 1974 (age 52); Redlands, California, U.S.
- Batted: Right Threw: Right

MLB debut
- April 20, 1998, for the Oakland Athletics

Last MLB appearance
- September 28, 2003, for the Texas Rangers

MLB statistics
- Batting average: .222
- Home runs: 16
- Runs batted in: 102
- Stats at Baseball Reference

Teams
- As player: Oakland Athletics (1998–2001); Arizona Diamondbacks (2001); Milwaukee Brewers (2002); Texas Rangers (2003); As coach: Oakland Athletics (2018–2021); San Diego Padres (2022–2023); San Francisco Giants (2024–2025); Athletics (2026–present)

Ryan Alan Christenson (born March 28, 1974) is an American professional baseball former outfielder, minor league manager, and current coach. He currently serves as the first base coach for the Athletics of Major League Baseball (MLB).

He played six seasons in MLB with the Athletics (1998–2001), was traded to the Arizona Diamondbacks for the second half of the 2001 season, and played one season each with the Milwaukee Brewers (2002) and the Texas Rangers (2003). After his playing career ended, he began managing in the Athletics' farm system. He was promoted to Oakland's coaching staff in 2018. He was also the associate manager for the San Diego Padres from 2022 to 2023.

== Playing career ==
=== Oakland Athletics ===
Christenson attended Pepperdine University and was drafted by the Oakland Athletics in the 10th round of the 1995 Major League Baseball draft. He played in his first professional season that year for the Class A Short Season Southern Oregon A's, batting .190/.286/.247. In 1996, he played for Southern Oregon and the Class A West Michigan Whitecaps. In 1997, he advanced to the Class A-Advanced Visalia Oaks, Double-A Huntsville Stars, and Triple-A Edmonton Trappers. He began the 1998 season at Triple-A, but was called up to the Athletics and made his major league debut on April 20. Christenson started the 1999 season in Oakland, but was sent to the Triple-A Vancouver Canadians for a month. He returned to the big league club in late May, and batted .209/.305/.306 for the season. He spent the entire 2000 season with the A's. He played seven games at the start of the 2001 season with Oakland, going hitless in four at bats before being sent to the Triple-A Sacramento River Cats, for whom he batted .171/.216/.271.

=== Arizona Diamondbacks ===
On June 19, 2001, Christenson was traded to the Arizona Diamondbacks for Rob Ryan. He played four games with Arizona, but was then optioned to the Triple-A Tucson Sidewinders. He was recalled to the majors at the September roster expansion.

=== Milwaukee Brewers ===
The Milwaukee Brewers selected Christenson in the 2001 Rule 5 draft. He played the majority of the 2002 season in the minors, mostly with the Triple-A Indianapolis Indians, but also a few with the Rookie Arizona League Brewers. He was recalled by Milwaukee in September and played the rest of the season with them, batting .155/.222/.276. He was released after the season.

=== Texas Rangers ===
Having signed as a free agent with the Texas Rangers for the 2003 season, Christenson split the year between the Rangers, for whom he batted .176/.255/.255, and their Triple-A Oklahoma RedHawks. He was granted free agency at the season's end.

=== Florida Marlins ===
Christenson signed a minor league contract with the Florida Marlins for 2004. He played the entire season with the Triple-A Albuquerque Isotopes. This was his last season playing professional baseball. In all, he played in 452 major league games in his career, with 222 hits in 998 at-bats (a .222 batting average). He had 16 home runs, 16 stolen bases, and 102 RBI.

== Managing career ==
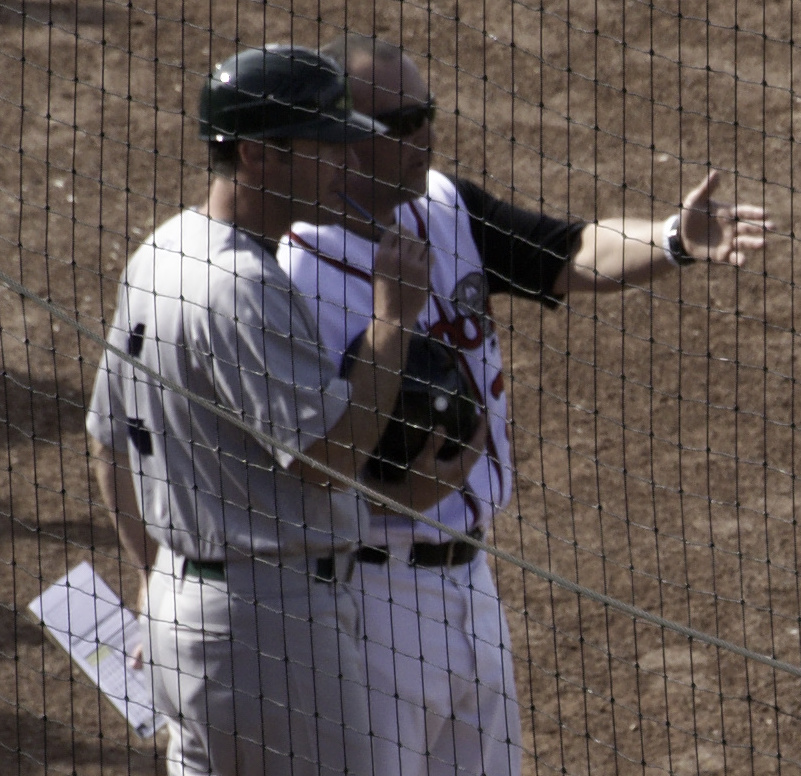
Christenson (left) with the Beloit Snappers and John Tamargo with the Lansing Lugnuts in 2013

After retiring from playing, Christenson began managing in the Oakland Athletics' minor league farm system in 2013. In his first year, he managed the Class A Beloit Snappers of the Midwest League. In 2014, he was manager of the Class A-Advanced Stockton Ports of the California League. He managed the Double-A Midland RockHounds of the Texas League in the 2015 and 2016 seasons. The RockHounds won back-to-back league championships in his two seasons, and he was selected as the Texas League Manager of the Year in 2016. In 2017, he managed the Triple-A Nashville Sounds of the Pacific Coast League to a record of 68-71 (.489).

== Major league coaching ==
=== Oakland Athletics ===
Christenson was promoted to bench coach with the Athletics for the 2018 season.

Christenson generated controversy in August 2020 after appearing to perform a Nazi salute after a game. Pitcher Liam Hendriks sought to correct him by pushing his arm down and saying "No, no, no straight arm!"; Christenson, realizing his mistake, laughed and briefly repeated the gesture. Christenson issued an apology the next day, stating “My gesture unintentionally resulted in a racist and horrible salute that I do not believe in. What I did is unacceptable and I deeply apologize.” The A's responded with a statement: "A's bench coach Ryan Christenson greeted players with a gesture that looked like a Nazi salute. We do not support or condone this gesture or the racist sentiment behind it."

=== San Diego Padres ===
On December 3, 2021, Christenson was hired by the San Diego Padres to serve as the team's bench coach for the 2022 season. On February 3, 2023, Christenson was promoted to "associate manager."

=== San Francisco Giants ===
Following the hiring of Bob Melvin as the 41st manager of the San Francisco Giants and his departure from the Padres, on November 10, 2023, it was announced that Christenson would be replacing Kai Correa as the bench coach for the Giants for the 2024 season. On September 29, 2025, following the dismissal of Melvin as manager of the Giants, Christenson told reporters that he would also not be returning to the team for the 2026 season.

=== Athletics ===
On November 5, 2025, the Athletics hired Christenson to serve as the team's first base coach.
