= Rick Heiserman =

American baseball player (born 1973)

- Pitcher
- Born: February 22, 1973 (age 53); Atlantic, Iowa, U.S.
- Batted: Right Threw: Right

MLB debut
- May 23, 1999, for the St. Louis Cardinals

Last MLB appearance
- August 17, 1999, for the St. Louis Cardinals

MLB statistics
- Win–loss record: 0–0
- Earned run average: 8.31
- Strikeouts: 4
- Stats at Baseball Reference

Teams
- St. Louis Cardinals (1999)

Richard Michael Heiserman (born February 22, 1973) is an American former Major League Baseball pitcher. Heiserman played for the St. Louis Cardinals in 1999. Heiserman came to the Cardinals after he was traded by the Cleveland Indians along with David Bell and Pepe McNeal in exchange for Ken Hill.
