= Ken Hill (baseball) =

American baseball player (born 1965)

- Pitcher
- Born: December 14, 1965 (age 60); Lynn, Massachusetts, U.S.
- Batted: Right Threw: Right

MLB debut
- September 3, 1988, for the St. Louis Cardinals

Last MLB appearance
- April 18, 2001, for the Tampa Bay Devil Rays

MLB statistics
- Win–loss record: 117–109
- Earned run average: 4.06
- Strikeouts: 1,181
- Stats at Baseball Reference

Teams
- St. Louis Cardinals (1988–1991); Montreal Expos (1992–1994); St. Louis Cardinals (1995); Cleveland Indians (1995); Texas Rangers (1996–1997); Anaheim Angels (1997–2000); Chicago White Sox (2000); Tampa Bay Devil Rays (2001)

Career highlights and awards
- All-Star (1994); NL wins leader (1994)

Kenneth Wade Hill (born December 14, 1965) is an American former Major League Baseball pitcher. During a 14-year career, he pitched for seven teams between 1988 and 2001. As a member of the Montreal Expos in 1994, he appeared in the All-Star Game and finished the season tied for the National League lead in wins. He pitched in the 1995 World Series as a member of the Cleveland Indians.

== Early life ==
Hill graduated from Lynn Classical High School in 1983 and attended North Adams State College.

== Career ==
Hill signed a contract with the Detroit Tigers on February 14, 1985. He made his professional debut that year for the Gastonia Jets of the Class A South Atlantic League. Hill posted a 3–6 record in 15 appearances (12 starts), with an earned run average of 4.96 in 69 innings.

Hill made 22 appearances (16 starts) for Gastonia in 1986. He posted a 9–5 record and a 2.79 ERA in 122.2 innings. He also made a single start for the Glens Falls Tigers, Detroit's Class AA affiliate, before he and a player to be named later, Mike Laga, were traded to the St. Louis Cardinals organization for Mike Heath on August 10. Before the season ended, Hill posted a 1–2 record in three starts with the Arkansas Travelers, St. Louis's Class AA affiliate.

He split the 1987 season between Arkansas and the Class A St. Petersburg Cardinals. Hill made 18 appearances for each team and 12 starts combined. With Arkansas, he posted a 3–5 record and a 5.20 ERA over 53.2 innings. With St. Petersburg, he recorded a 1–3 mark and a 4.17 ERA over 41 innings.

In 1988, Hill made 22 starts for Arkansas. He posted a 9–9 record and a 4.92 ERA. He also saw limited action with the Cardinals, making his MLB debut on September 3. In that game, Hill faced the Houston Astros and surrendered a pair of earned runs in three innings. In 4 games (1 start) with the Cardinals, Hill tallied an 0–1 record and a 5.14 ERA in 14 innings.

Hill was called up by the injury-plagued St. Louis Cardinals in 1989. He started well, but soon went downhill. He finished that season 7–15, but with a decent 3.80 ERA. After an ineffective 1990, Hill went 11–10 with a 3.57 ERA in 1991. In November 1991, he was traded to the Montreal Expos for first baseman Andrés Galarraga. It was as a member of these Expos that Hill found his groove.

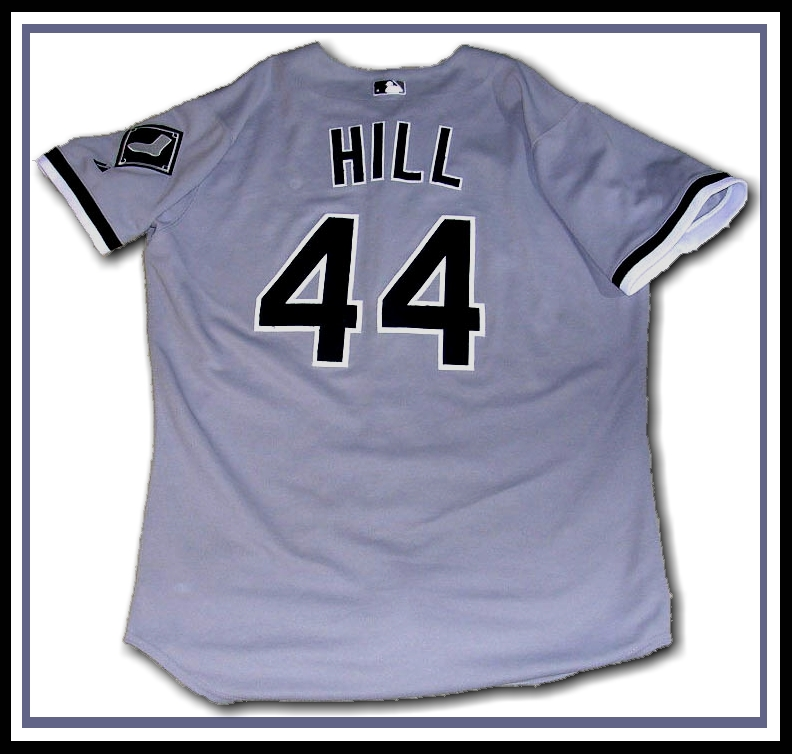
Hill donned a White Sox jersey in only two outings before being released by the team in 2000.

In both 1992 and 1994, Hill won 16 games, going 16–9 with a 2.68 ERA in 1991 and 16–5 with a 3.32 ERA in 1994. Notably, the 1994 season was curtailed on August 12 due to the Major League Baseball strike, stranding him on pace for a 23–7 season. He was also an All-Star in 1994, pitching 2 innings in relief and walking one, and finished second in Cy Young voting to Greg Maddux. He then returned to the Cardinals, where he suffered the same fate he endured in his first stint in St. Louis, winning only 6 games, losing 7, and posting a 5.06 ERA. He was then traded to the Cleveland Indians for minor league prospects David Bell, Rick Heiserman, and Pepe McNeal. He did well for the Indians, going 4–1 in the remainder of the regular season and 2–1 in the postseason.

He filed for free agency in the 1995 postseason and was signed by the Texas Rangers. In 1996, he tied for the team lead (along with Bobby Witt) with 16 wins and led the Rangers to the postseason for the first time. In 1997, however, an injury sent him to the disabled list and greatly affected the rest of his playing career. He also played for the Anaheim Angels after being traded there later in 1997 for Jim Leyritz. He performed poorly over the next two years, going 13-17 and finally being relegated to the bullpen in 1999. He was released in August 2000 but signed by the Chicago White Sox, for whom he promptly gave up eight runs in three innings and was released two weeks later.

He accepted a non-roster invitation from the Tampa Bay Devil Rays in 2001, and appeared in five games for them before being released on April 19. Hill subsequently signed a contract with the Cincinnati Reds on May 18, but he was released exactly a month later, on June 18. The next day, Hill was signed by the Boston Red Sox, but he did not remain with their organization following the season.

== Personal life ==
Hill currently resides in Keller, Texas. His son, Kenny Hill, was a quarterback at Texas Christian University. His youngest son, Marcus, played baseball for the Southlake Carroll Dragons and plays for the Eastern Kentucky University.

== See also ==
- List of Major League Baseball annual wins leaders
- List of Texas Rangers Opening Day starting pitchers
