= Carl Dale (baseball) =

American baseball player (born 1972)

- Pitcher
- Born: December 7, 1972 (age 53); Indianapolis, Indiana, U.S.
- Batted: Right Threw: Right

MLB debut
- September 7, 1999, for the Milwaukee Brewers

Last MLB appearance
- September 26, 1999, for the Milwaukee Brewers

MLB statistics
- Win–loss record: 0-1
- Earned run average: 20.25
- Strikeouts: 4
- Stats at Baseball Reference

Teams
- Milwaukee Brewers (1999)

James Carl Dale (born December 7, 1972) is an American former Major League Baseball (MLB) pitcher who played for the Milwaukee Brewers in 1999.

== Amateur career ==
A native of Indianapolis, Indiana, Dale attended Cookeville High School and Winthrop University. In 1993, he played collegiate summer baseball in the Cape Cod Baseball League for the Yarmouth-Dennis Red Sox. He was selected by the St. Louis Cardinals in the second round of the 1994 MLB draft.

== Professional career ==
Dale was traded by the Cardinals to the Oakland Athletics in 1996, and traded from the Athletics to the Milwaukee Brewers in 1999. He made his major league debut with the Brewers in 1999, appearing in four games in September of that season.
