= Dan Simonds =

American baseball coach (born 1965)

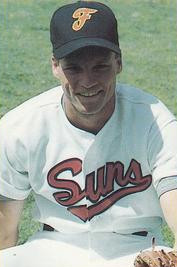
- Simonds in 1988

Biographical details
- Born: February 7, 1965 (age 60); Boston, Massachusetts, U.S.

Playing career
- 1984–1987: Davidson
- Position: Catcher

Coaching career (HC unless noted)
- 2000–2004: Miami (OH) (assistant)
- 2005: Xavier
- 2006–2013: Miami (OH)
- 2014: Indiana (assistant)

Dan Simonds (born February 7, 1965) is an American baseball coach. He has served as a coach in the minor leagues, college, and amateur ranks. He is currently serving as director of baseball at IMG Academy.

== Playing career ==
A native of Boston, Massachusetts, Simonds graduated from Barnstable High School, and played college baseball at Davidson College as a catcher. In 1984 and 1986, he played collegiate summer baseball with the Cotuit Kettleers of the Cape Cod Baseball League, and in 1985 he played for the New Market Rebels of the Valley Baseball League. He was selected in the 7th Round of the 1987 MLB draft by the Baltimore Orioles. Simonds played in the Orioles and Chicago Cubs organizations, reaching Triple-A.

== Coaching career ==
After ending his playing career in 1991, he was a bullpen catcher for three seasons, then a roving instructor/coach with the Orioles. He was a hitting and catching instructor with the Clinton LumberKings before one season as manager of the Class-A Fort Wayne Wizards. In 2000, he became an assistant coach with Miami (OH), where he remained for five seasons as a hitting coach and recruiting coordinator. After one season as head coach of Xavier, he returned to Miami as head coach in 2006 for eight seasons. He was named associate head coach of Indiana before moving to IMG Academy.
