= Rob Ryan (baseball) =

American baseball player (born 1973)

- Outfielder
- Born: June 24, 1973 (age 53); Havre, Montana, U.S.
- Batted: Left Threw: Left

MLB debut
- August 20, 1999, for the Arizona Diamondbacks

Last MLB appearance
- October 7, 2001, for the Oakland Athletics

MLB statistics
- Batting average: .234
- Home runs: 2
- Runs batted in: 7
- Stats at Baseball Reference

Teams
- Arizona Diamondbacks (1999–2001); Oakland Athletics (2001)

Rob Ryan (born June 24, 1973) is a former outfielder in Major League Baseball who played for the Arizona Diamondbacks and the Oakland Athletics. He attended Washington State University where he played college baseball for the Cougars from 1993–1996, and was drafted by the Diamondbacks in the 26th round (785th overall pick) of the 1996 Major League Baseball draft. He signed with the Diamondbacks two days later on June 6. Ryan, who batted and threw left-handed, was listed at 5' 11" in height, and 192 lb in weight.

== Major league career ==
=== Debut ===
Ryan made his major league debut on August 20, 1999 with the Diamondbacks against the Pittsburgh Pirates. They were playing at Three Rivers Stadium, with 23,934 people attending the game. In the top of the seventh inning, Ryan was asked to pinch hit for pitcher Greg Swindell, batting ninth. With runners on first and third base, Pirates pitcher Marc Wilkins balked in Ryan's first at-bat, which made all the players on base advance to the next base as a result, with the runner on third, Steve Finley, scoring a run for the Diamondbacks. Ryan ultimately grounded out, second to first, on his at-bat. In the bottom of the seventh, pitcher Dan Plesac was called to replace Ryan, pitching and batting ninth. The Diamondbacks lost the game by the score of 5–4.

=== Career after debut ===
On June 19, 2001, Ryan was traded by the Diamondbacks to the Oakland Athletics for Ryan Christenson. He played his last major league game on October 7 of that year. One year and two days after being traded, on July 21, 2002, Ryan was purchased by the Boston Red Sox from the Athletics. From this point, Ryan was signed, released, or granted free agency multiple times for about the next three years.

Ryan was then granted free agency on September 30, 2002. On November 18, he signed as a free agent with the Toronto Blue Jays. On June 19, 2003, the Blue Jays released Ryan, who was signed three days later on June 22, this time by the San Francisco Giants as a free agent. He was granted free agency again on October 15. The Houston Astros signed Ryan as a free agent on February 5, 2004. On June 18, he was yet again granted free agency, just to be signed almost a month later by the Florida Marlins as a free agent on July 19. On October 15, Ryan was granted free agency, and was signed again with the Marlins as a free agent on November 11 after the season ended.
