= J. D. Smart =

American baseball player (born 1973)

- Pitcher
- Born: November 12, 1973 (age 51); San Saba, Texas, U.S.
- Batted: Right Threw: Right

MLB debut
- April 6, 1999, for the Montreal Expos

Last MLB appearance
- June 30, 2001, for the Texas Rangers

MLB statistics
- Win–loss record: 1–3
- Earned run average: 5.35
- Strikeouts: 31
- Stats at Baseball Reference

Teams
- Montreal Expos (1999); Texas Rangers (2001)

Jon David "J. D." Smart (born November 12, 1973) is a former Major League Baseball pitcher who played for the Montreal Expos (1999) and Texas Rangers (2001). He played college baseball for the Texas Longhorns.
