= 1999 Colorado Rockies season =

1999 Colorado Rockies
- League: National League
- Division: West
- Ballpark: Coors Field
- City: Denver, Colorado
- Record: 72–90 (.444)
- Divisional place: 5th
- Owner: Jerry McMorris
- General managers: Bob Gebhard, Dan O'Dowd
- Manager: Jim Leyland
- Television: KWGN-TV; Fox Sports Rocky Mountain (George Frazier, Dave Armstrong)
- Radio: KOA (AM) (Wayne Hagin, Jeff Kingery); KCUV (Antonio Guevara)
- Stats: ESPN.com; Baseball Reference

The Colorado Rockies' 1999 season was the seventh for the Major League Baseball (MLB) franchise located in Denver, Colorado, their seventh in the National League (NL), and fifth at Coors Field. The team competed in the National League West, finishing in fifth and last place with a record of 72–90. Jim Leyland, a longtime manager in MLB, debuted as the Rockies' new manager, and resigned following the season.

The Rockies, along with the San Diego Padres, made MLB history on Opening Day, April 4, 1999, by playing a contest in Estadio de Béisbol Monterrey in Monterrey, Mexico, making it the first Opening Day game held outside of the United States or Canada. Larry Walker won his second batting title by leading MLB with .379 average, setting a Rockies' club record, and the fourth-high single-season average since Ted Williams hit .406 in 1941. Besides winning the batting championship, Walker also led the major leagues in on-base percentage (.458), and slugging percentage (.710), becoming the first player to lead MLB in all three categories since George Brett in 1980, and the first National Leaguer since Stan Musial in 1943. Despite the team hitting quite well and appearing in the league's top 4 teams in hits, runs, and batting average, the team's performance was poor; the pitching staff performed awfully, allowing 1,028 total runs - a mark that, as of 2026, has not since been surpassed by any team. The team set franchise records in earned runs surrendered, walks issued, hits allowed, and ERA. The pitching staff combined for an ERA of 6.01, a new franchise-worst record that has also not since been surpassed by any team.

== Offseason ==
- October 29, 1998: John Vander Wal was traded by the Colorado Rockies to the San Diego Padres for a player to be named later. The San Diego Padres sent Kevin Burford (minors) (October 29, 1998) to the Colorado Rockies to complete the trade.
- November 9, 1998: Brian Bohanon and Lenny Harris were signed as free agents by the Colorado Rockies.
- November 20, 1998: Jason Bates was released by the Colorado Rockies.
- December 18, 1998: Henry Blanco was signed as a free agent by the Colorado Rockies.

== Regular season ==
On April 4, 1999, the Rockies made history as they played their Opening Day contest at Estadio de Béisbol Monterrey in Monterrey, Mexico, marking the first time Major League Baseball (MLB) commenced the regular season outside of the United States or Canada. Their opponent were the defending National League champion San Diego Padres. Vinny Castilla, a native of the southern Mexican state of Oaxaca, delighted the crowd with four hits including a double. Dante Bichette also collected four hits, drove in four runs, and homered, as Colorado won 8–2. The official attendance was 27,104.

The Rockies' scheduled home games against the Montreal Expos on April 20 and 21 were both postponed in the aftermath of the Columbine High School massacre in which 15 people, including both shooters died. The Rockies then added a "CHS" patch on the right sleeve of their jerseys which they wore for the remainder of the season.

On April 28, right fielder Larry Walker hit three home runs against the St. Louis Cardinals for his second career three home run game while contributing eight RBI in a 9–7 win.

In the May 19 contest versus the Cincinnati Reds, the Rockies were on the losing end of a 24−12 final, tied for the fourth-highest run-scoring output in MLB history. The Reds' Jeffrey Hammonds hit three home runs; following the season, Colorado acquired him via trade. Both Hammonds and Sean Casey totaled four hits. Casey went on base seven times with three walks, scoring five runs, and hit two home runs and six RBI. The Reds totaled six home runs; Brian Johnson hit the remainder. Both Walker and Bichette had four hits. Bichette also had five RBI, and Castilla hit a three-run home run. Walker raised his season average to .431.

From June 18−23, Walker tied Bichette's club record by homering in five consecutive games. The following day, Walker tied another club record, held by Andrés Galarraga, with his sixth consecutive multi-hit game. On July 8, Walker hit his 250th career home run versus Chan Ho Park of the Los Angeles Dodgers.

Carrying a .382 first-half average, Walker had batted .390 (189 hits in 484 at bats) from the 1998 All-Star break to the same point in 1999, the equivalent of a full season. He was named to his third consecutive All-Star team. In the July 19 contest versus the Oakland Athletics, Walker became the second player to homer into the plaza reserve seating of the Oakland Coliseum, following Mark McGwire, who had done so three seasons earlier.

For the season, Walker batted .379 − setting a Rockies record and the fourth-highest since Ted Williams hit .406 in 1941 − while leading the major leagues in batting for a second time. Walker also led the major leagues in offensive win % (.838), on-base percentage (.458), slugging percentage (.710), and OPS (1.168). Sometimes referred to as the "Slash Stat Triple Crown," he became the seventh player within the previous 60 years to lead the league in each of average, OBP and SLG in the same season, and first since George Brett in 1980. The last NL player to lead the majors in each of the three slash stat categories was Stan Musial in 1943. Walker also hit 37 home runs and 115 RBI in just 438 at bats, stole 11 bases in 15 attempts, and registered 12 outfield assists.

Per the Elias Sports Bureau (ESB), Walker's .461 average at Coors is the highest home batting average since ESB began tracking home/road splits in 1974, and 43 points higher than any other player's in that span.

=== Opening Day starters ===
27	Darryl Hamilton	CF
5	Neifi Perez	SS
28	Lenny Harris	RF
10	Dante Bichette	LF
14	Vinny Castilla	3B
17	Todd Helton	1B
3	Mike Lansing	2B
8	Kirt Manwaring	C
57	Darryl Kile	P

=== Season standings ===
NL West
Team	W	L	Pct.	GB	Home	Road
Arizona Diamondbacks	100	62	.617	—	52‍–‍29	48‍–‍33
San Francisco Giants	86	76	.531	14	49‍–‍32	37‍–‍44
Los Angeles Dodgers	77	85	.475	23	37‍–‍44	40‍–‍41
San Diego Padres	74	88	.457	26	46‍–‍35	28‍–‍53
Colorado Rockies	72	90	.444	28	39‍–‍42	33‍–‍48

=== Record vs. opponents ===
1999 National League record Source: MLB Standings Grid – 1999
Team	AZ	ATL	CHC	CIN	COL	FLA	HOU	LAD	MIL	MON	NYM	PHI	PIT	SD	SF	STL	AL
Arizona	—	4–5	7–2	1–8	6–7	8–1	5–4	7–6	5–4	6–3	7–2	8–1	5–2	11–2	9–3	4–4	7–8
Atlanta	5–4	—	2–5	8–1	5–4	9–4	6–1	5–4	5–2	9–4	9–3	8–5	6–3	5–4	4–5	8–1	9–9
Chicago	2–7	5–2	—	5–8	4–5	6–3	3–9	2–7	6–6	2–5	3–6	2–7	7–6	6–3	1–7	7–5	6–9
Cincinnati	8–1	1–8	8–5	—	7–2	6–1	9–4	4–3	6–6	4–3	5–5	6–3	7–6	6–3	4–5	8–4	7–8
Colorado	7–6	4–5	5–4	2–7	—	5–4	2–6	8–5	6–3	6–3	4–5	5–4	2–7	4–9	4–9	4–5	4–8
Florida	1–8	4–9	3–6	1–6	4–5	—	2–7	7–2	5–4	8–4	3–10	2–11	3–4	3–6	4–5	3–4	11–7
Houston	4–5	1–6	9–3	4–9	6–2	7–2	—	6–3	8–5	7–2	4–5	6–1	5–7	8–1	5–4	5–7	12–3
Los Angeles	6–7	4–5	7–2	3–4	5–8	2–7	3–6	—	7–2	5–4	4–4	6–3	3–6	3–9	8–5	3–6	8–7
Milwaukee	4–5	2–5	6–6	6–6	3–6	4–5	5–8	2–7	—	5–4	2–5	5–4	8–4	3–5	4–5	7–6	8–6
Montreal	3–6	4–9	5–2	3–4	3–6	4–8	2–7	4–5	4–5	—	5–8	6–6	3–6	5–3	4–5	5–4	8–10
New York	2–7	3–9	6–3	5–5	5–4	10–3	5–4	4–4	5–2	8–5	—	6–6	7–2	7–2	7–2	5–2	12–6
Philadelphia	1–8	5–8	7–2	3–6	4–5	11–2	1–6	3–6	4–5	6–6	6–6	—	3–4	6–3	2–6	4–5	11–7
Pittsburgh	2–5	3–6	6–7	6–7	7–2	4–3	7–5	6–3	4–8	6–3	2–7	4–3	—	3–6	4–5	7–5	7–8
San Diego	2–11	4–5	3–6	3–6	9–4	6–3	1–8	9–3	5–3	3–5	2–7	3–6	6–3	—	5–7	2–7	11–4
San Francisco	3–9	5–4	7–1	5–4	9–4	5–4	4–5	5–8	5–4	5–4	2–7	6–2	5–4	7–5	—	6–3	7–8
St. Louis	4–4	1–8	5–7	4–8	5–4	4–3	7–5	6–3	6–7	4–5	2–5	5–4	5–7	7–2	3–6	—	7–8

=== Notable transactions ===
- June 2, 1999: Jason Jennings was drafted by the Colorado Rockies in the 1st round of the 1999 amateur draft. Player signed June 9, 1999.
- July 2, 1999: Jeff Reed was released by the Colorado Rockies.
- July 31, 1999: Darryl Hamilton was traded by the Colorado Rockies with Chuck McElroy to the New York Mets for Brian McRae, Rigo Beltrán, and Thomas Johnson (minors).
- August 9, 1999: Brian McRae was traded by the Colorado Rockies to the Toronto Blue Jays for a player to be named later. The Toronto Blue Jays sent Pat Lynch (minors) (August 23, 1999) to the Colorado Rockies to complete the trade.

=== Major League debuts ===
- Batters:
  - Chris Sexton (May 3)
  - Chris Petersen (May 25)
  - Ben Petrick (Sep 1)
  - Juan Sosa (Sep 10)
- Pitchers:
  - David Lee (May 22)
  - Mike Porzio (Jul 9)
  - Luther Hackman (Sep 1)

=== Roster ===
1999 Colorado Rockies
Roster
Pitchers: 34 Pedro Astacio; 48 Rigo Beltrán; 41 Brian Bohanon; 46 Mark Brownson; 44 Mike DeJean; 45 Jerry DiPoto; 19 Luther Hackman; 36 Bobby Jones; 57 Darryl Kile; 54 David Lee; 16 Curtis Leskanic; 23 Chuck McElroy; 53 Mike Porzio; 49 Roberto Ramírez; 52 John Thomson; 47 Dave Veres; 41 Dave Wainhouse; 21 Jamey Wright	Catchers: 35 Henry Blanco; 8 Kirt Manwaring; 15 Ben Petrick; 15 Jeff Reed; Infielders: 7 Kurt Abbott; 9,14 Vinny Castilla; 28 Lenny Harris; 17 Todd Helton; 3 Mike Lansing; 5 Neifi Pérez; 2 Chris Petersen; 22 Terry Shumpert	Outfielders: 27 Jeff Barry; 10 Dante Bichette; 23 John Cangelosi; 19,12 Edgard Clemente; 39 Angel Echevarria; 24 Derrick Gibson; 12 Darryl Hamilton; 27 Mike Kelly; 56 Brian McRae; 29,31 J. R. Phillips; 4 Chris Sexton; 2 Juan Sosa; 33 Larry Walker; 22 Pat Watkins	Manager: 11 Jim Leyland; Coaches: 20 Lorenzo Bundy (bullpen); 26 Rich Donnelly (third base); 13 Clint Hurdle (hitting); 6 Bruce Kimm (bench); 29 Milt May (pitching); 37 Tommy Sandt (first base)

== Player stats ==
= Indicates team leader

=== Batting ===
==== Starters by position ====
Note: Pos = Position; G = Games played; AB = At bats; H = Hits; Avg. = Batting average; HR = Home runs; RBI = Runs batted in

Pos	Player	G	AB	H	Avg.	HR	RBI	SB
C	Henry Blanco	88	263	61	.232	6	28	1
1B	Todd Helton	159	578	185	.320	35	113	7
2B	Kurt Abbott	96	286	78	.273	8	41	3
SS	Neifi Pérez	157	690	193	.280	12	70	13
3B	Vinny Castilla	158	615	169	.275	33	102	2
LF	Dante Bichette	151	593	177	.298	34	133	6
CF	Darryl Hamilton	91	337	102	.303	4	24	4
RF	Larry Walker	127	438	166	.379	37	115	11

==== Other batters ====
Note: G = Games played; AB = At bats; H = Hits; Avg. = Batting average; HR = Home runs; RBI = Runs batted in

Player	G	AB	H	Avg.	HR	RBI	SB
Jeff Barry	74	168	45	.268	5	26	0
John Cangelosi	7	6	1	.167	0	0	0
Edgard Clemente	57	162	41	.253	8	25	0
Angel Echevarria	102	191	56	.293	11	35	1
Derrick Gibson	10	28	5	.179	2	6	0
Lenny Harris	91	158	47	.297	0	13	1
Mike Kelly	2	2	1	.500	0	1	0
Mike Lansing	35	145	45	.310	4	15	2
Kirt Manwaring	48	137	41	.299	2	14	0
Brian McRae	7	23	6	.261	1	1	0
Chris Petersen	7	13	2	.153	0	2	0
Ben Petrick	19	62	20	.323	4	12	1
J.R. Phillips	25	39	0	.231	2	4	0
Jeff Reed	45	106	27	.255	2	11	0
Terry Shumpert	92	262	91	.347	10	37	14
Juan Sosa	11	9	2	.222	0	0	0
Pat Watkins	16	19	1	.053	0	0	0

=== Pitching ===
==== Starting pitchers ====
Note: G = Games pitched; IP = Innings pitched; W = Wins; L = Losses; ERA = Earned run average; SO = Strikeouts

Player	G	IP	W	L	ERA	SO
Pedro Astacio	34	232.0	17	11	5.04	210
Brian Bohanon	33	197.1	12	12	6.20	120
Darryl Kile	32	190.2	8	13	6.61	116
Bobby Jones	30	112.1	6	10	6.33	74
John Thomson	14	62.2	1	10	8.04	34
Jamey Wright	16	94.1	4	3	4.87	49

==== Relief pitchers ====
Note: G = Games pitched; W = Wins; L = Losses; SV = Saves; ERA = Earned run average; SO = Strikeouts

Player	G	IP	W	L	ERA	SO	SV
Rigo Beltrán	12	11.0	0	0	8.59	10	0
Mike DeJean	56	61.0	2	4	8.41	31	0
Jerry DiPoto	63	86.2	4	5	4.26	69	1
David Lee	36	49.0	3	2	3.67	38	0
Curtis Leskanic	63	85.0	6	2	5.08	77	0
Chuck McElroy	41	40.2	3	1	6.20	37	0
Mike Porzio	16	14.2	0	0	8.59	10	0
Roberto Ramírez	32	40.1	1	5	8.26	32	1
Dave Veres	73	77.0	4	8	5.14	71	31
Dave Wainhouse	19	28.2	0	0	6.91	18	0

==== Other pitchers ====
Note: G = Games pitched; IP = Innings pitched; W = Wins; L = Losses; ERA = Earned run average; SO = Strikeouts

Player	G	IP	W	L	ERA	SO	Sv
Mark Brownson	7	29.2	0	2	7.89	21	0
Luther Hackman	5	16.0	1	2	10.69	10	0

== Game log ==
1999 Game Log
April

#	Date	Opponent	Score	Win	Loss	Save	Attendance	Record
1	April 4	@ Padres	8–2	Kile (1–0)	Ashby (0–1)		27,104	1–0
2	April 6	@ Padres	4–3	Hitchcock (1–0)	Astacio (0–1)	Hoffman (1)	61,247	1–1
3	April 7	@ Padres	2–1	Rivera (1–0)	Jones (0–1)		32,751	1–2
4	April 8	@ Dodgers	4–2	Bohanon (1–0)	Pérez (0–1)	Veres (1)	27,879	2–2
5	April 9	@ Dodgers	9–6	Dreifort (1–0)	Thomson (0–1)	Shaw (2)	39,997	2–3
6	April 10	@ Dodgers	2–0	Brown (1–0)	Kile (1–1)	Shaw (3)	44,503	2–4
	April 11	@ Dodgers	Postponed (Rain; rescheduled for July 22)					2–4
7	April 12	Padres	8–5 (11)	Wall (1–0)	Veres (0–1)	Reyes (1)	48,073	2–5
	April 14	Padres	Postponed (Snow; rescheduled for July 3)					2–5
8	April 15	Padres	6–4	Bohanon (2–0)	Clement (0–2)	Veres (2)	40,027	3–5
	April 16	Braves	Postponed (Snow; rescheduled for August 19)					3–5
9	April 17	Braves	5–4	McElroy (1–0)	Rocker (1–1)		42,510	4–5
10	April 18	Braves	20–5	Maddux (2–0)	Astacio (0–2)		44,285	4–6
11	April 19	Expos	11–10	Veres (1–1)	Urbina (1–1)		40,209	5–6
	April 20	Expos	Postponed (Columbine High School massacre; rescheduled for August 13)					5–6
	April 21	Expos	Postponed (Columbine High School massacre; rescheduled for August 15)					5–6
12	April 22	@ Giants	8–5	Bohanon (3–0)	Rueter (1–1)	Veres (3)	11,061	6–6
13	April 23	@ Giants	7–2	Ortiz (2–2)	Kile (1–2)		16,271	6–7
14	April 24	@ Giants	8–4	Estes (2–1)	Astacio (0–3)		26,626	6–8
15	April 25	@ Giants	7–6	Embree (2–0)	DeJean (0–1)	Nen (6)	23,099	6–9
16	April 27	@ Cardinals	7–5	Oliver (2–1)	Thomson (0–2)	Radinsky (1)	32,389	6–10
17	April 28	@ Cardinals	9–7	Bohanon (4–0)	Jiménez (2–1)	Veres (4)	34,545	7–10
18	April 29	@ Cardinals	6–2	Kile (2–2)	Mercker (2–1)		41,909	8–10
19	April 30	@ Pirates	7–2	Astacio (1–3)	Schourek (1–2)		17,466	9–10

May

#	Date	Opponent	Score	Win	Loss	Save	Attendance	Record
20	May 1	@ Pirates	9–3	Ritchie (1–1)	Wright (0–1)		18,599	9–11
21	May 2	@ Pirates	8–5	Schmidt (4–1)	Thomson (0–3)	Williams (4)	19,215	9–12
22	May 3	@ Cubs	6–1	Bohanon (5–0)	Trachsel (1–3)		32,085	10–12
23	May 4	@ Cubs	13–12	Beck (2–2)	DiPoto (0–1)		28,888	10–13
24	May 5	@ Cubs	13–6	Astacio (2–3)	Mulholland (2–1)		30,079	11–13
25	May 7	Phillies	8–1	Schilling (5–1)	Thomson (0–4)		41,465	11–14
26	May 8	Phillies	7–2	Bennett (1–0)	Bohanon (5–1)		43,340	11–15
27	May 9	Phillies	10–8	Ryan (1–1)	Veres (1–2)	Gomes (2)	40,251	11–16
28	May 10	Mets	10–3	Astacio (3–3)	Leiter (1–4)		40,021	12–16
29	May 11	Mets	8–5	Jones (1–1)	Jones (3–1)		40,032	13–16
30	May 12	Mets	10–5	Reed (3–1)	Thomson (0–5)		41,011	13–17
31	May 14	@ Diamondbacks	4–1	Bohanon (6–1)	Benes (2–4)		38,894	14–17
32	May 15	@ Diamondbacks	9–2	Johnson (4–1)	Kile (2–3)		40,853	14–18
33	May 16	@ Diamondbacks	5–1	Astacio (4–3)	Daal (3–4)		38,869	15–18
34	May 17	Reds	7–2	Harnisch (3–4)	Jones (1–2)		40,067	15–19
35	May 18	Reds	5–3	Graves (3–3)	Leskanic (0–1)	Williamson (4)	40,032	15–20
36	May 19	Reds	24–12	Parris (2–0)	DiPoto (0–2)	Villone (1)	41,044	15–21
37	May 20	Diamondbacks	8–4	Kile (3–3)	Johnson (4–2)		40,021	16–21
38	May 21	Diamondbacks	8–7 (11)	Leskanic (1–1)	Frascatore (1–3)		44,205	17–21
39	May 22	Diamondbacks	8–3	Daal (4–4)	Jones (1–3)		48,594	17–22
40	May 23	Diamondbacks	7–6	McElroy (2–0)	Olson (2–3)		46,299	18–22
41	May 24	@ Astros	5–2	Reynolds (7–3)	Bohanon (6–2)		20,772	18–23
42	May 25	@ Astros	2–1 (12)	Elarton (3–1)	DeJean (0–2)		21,720	18–24
43	May 26	@ Astros	3–2	Powell (3–1)	Astacio (4–4)		24,476	18–25
44	May 27	@ Astros	4–3	DiPoto (1–2)	Miller (0–1)	Veres (5)	25,146	19–25
45	May 28	@ Phillies	5–3	Leskanic (2–1)	Byrd (6–3)	Veres (6)	16,365	20–25
46	May 29	@ Phillies	2–0	Schilling (8–2)	Bohanon (6–3)		22,204	20–26
47	May 30	@ Phillies	1–0	Kile (4–3)	Poole (0–1)	Veres (7)	30,358	21–26
48	May 31	@ Braves	3–1	Millwood (6–3)	Astacio (4–5)	Rocker (10)	34,136	21–27

June

#	Date	Opponent	Score	Win	Loss	Save	Attendance	Record
49	June 1	@ Braves	7–2	Smoltz (6–1)	Jones (1–4)		30,297	21–28
50	June 2	@ Braves	3–2 (11)	DiPoto (2–2)	Springer (0–1)		32,429	22–28
51	June 4	Brewers	9–8 (10)	Veres (2–2)	Wickman (2–3)		40,064	23–28
52	June 5	Brewers	12–11	DeJean (1–2)	Plunk (0–1)	DiPoto (1)	43,409	24–28
53	June 6	Brewers	10–5	Astacio (5–5)	Karl (5–5)		41,688	25–28
54	June 7	Mariners	4–2	Halama (4–2)	Jones (1–5)	Mesa (11)	40,692	25–29
55	June 8	Mariners	10–5	Rodriguez (1–0)	Brownson (0–1)	Cloude (1)	41,940	25–30
56	June 9	Mariners	16–11	Bohanon (7–3)	Fassero (3–7)		40,671	26–30
57	June 11	@ Rangers	3–2	Zimmerman (7–0)	McElroy (2–1)	Wetteland (21)	39,627	26–31
58	June 12	@ Rangers	8–7	Astacio (6–5)	Sele (6–5)	Veres (8)	46,851	27–31
59	June 13	@ Rangers	4–2	Jones (2–5)	Morgan (6–5)	Veres (9)	39,651	28–31
60	June 14	Giants	5–4	Leskanic (3–1)	Johnstone (4–4)	Veres (10)	40,029	29–31
61	June 15	Giants	15–6	Bohanon (8–3)	Brock (5–6)		40,037	30–31
62	June 16	Giants	15–2	Gardner (1–5)	Kile (4–4)		41,307	30–32
63	June 18	Marlins	11–10	McElroy (3–1)	Mantei (1–2)		46,394	31–32
64	June 19	Marlins	10–2	Jones (3–5)	Fernandez (2–4)		47,051	32–32
65	June 20	Marlins	8–7	Bohanon (9–3)	Dempster (3–3)	Veres (11)	47,070	33–32
66	June 22	Cubs	13–12	Sanders (2–4)	DeJean (1–3)	Aguilera (8)	48,081	33–33
67	June 23	Cubs	10–1	Astacio (7–5)	Mulholland (3–3)		48,189	34–33
68	June 24	Cubs	12–10	Tapani (6–3)	Jones (3–6)		48,876	34–34
69	June 25	@ Padres	10–1	Boehringer (4–1)	Bohanon (9–4)		22,362	34–35
70	June 26	@ Padres	13–6	Clement (4–7)	Brownson (0–2)		47,808	34–36
71	June 27	@ Padres	5–3	Hitchcock (6–6)	Kile (4–5)	Hoffman (18)	25,177	34–37
72	June 28	@ Padres	8–7	Williams (4–5)	Astacio (7–6)	Hoffman (19)	41,107	34–38
73	June 29	@ Giants	10–1	Rueter (7–3)	Jones (3–7)		11,490	34–39
74	June 30	@ Giants	4–1	Ortiz (9–5)	Bohanon (9–5)	Nen (20)	24,825	34–40

July

#	Date	Opponent	Score	Win	Loss	Save	Attendance	Record
75	July 1	@ Giants	7–1	Estes (5–5)	Kile (4–6)		23,172	34–41
76	July 2	Padres	15–3	Hitchcock (7–6)	Astacio (7–7)		41,739	34–42
77	July 3	Padres	12–10	Ramírez (1–0)	Williams (4–6)	Veres (12)	38,375	35–42
78	July 3	Padres	8–6	Jones (4–7)	Murray (0–3)	Veres (13)	48,750	36–42
79	July 4	Padres	11–0	Ashby (8–4)	Bohanon (9–6)		38,059	36–43
80	July 5	Dodgers	8–4	Kile (5–6)	Brown (9–6)		40,063	37–43
81	July 6	Dodgers	5–2	Astacio (8–7)	Dreifort (6–8)		39,979	38–43
82	July 7	Dodgers	7–5	DeJean (2–3)	Arnold (2–2)	Veres (14)	40,221	39–43
83	July 8	Dodgers	11–8	Park (5–7)	Bohanon (9–7)	Shaw (19)	42,024	39–44
84	July 9	Angels	9–6	Finley (5–9)	Kile (5–7)	Percival (23)	44,122	39–45
85	July 10	Angels	9–3	Olivares (8–6)	Astacio (8–8)		48,069	39–46
86	July 11	Angels	8–2	DiPoto (3–2)	Fyhrie (0–1)		42,585	40–46
87	July 15	@ Reds	10–7	Parris (6–1)	Kile (5–8)	Graves (13)	22,243	40–47
88	July 16	@ Reds	6–2	Astacio (9–8)	Villone (4–3)	Veres (15)	29,552	41–47
89	July 17	@ Reds	3–2	Williamson (8–4)	DiPoto (3–3)		26,605	41–48
90	July 18	@ Athletics	3–2	Haynes (7–7)	Jones (4–8)	Taylor (24)	15,074	41–49
91	July 19	@ Athletics	10–5	Worrell (2–1)	Ramírez (1–1)	Jones (4)	9,281	41–50
92	July 20	@ Athletics	4–3	Rogers (5–3)	Kile (5–9)	Taylor (25)	13,414	41–51
93	July 21	@ Dodgers	5–4	Astacio (10–8)	Valdez (8–8)	Veres (16)	34,271	42–51
94	July 22	@ Dodgers	4–1	Jones (5–8)	Park (6–8)	Veres (17)	34,231	43–51
95	July 22	@ Dodgers	12–11	Lee (1–0)	Masaoka (1–2)	Veres (18)	30,907	44–51
96	July 23	Cardinals	6–4	Oliver (5–7)	Ramírez (1–2)	Slocumb (1)	48,824	44–52
97	July 24	Cardinals	10–2	Mercker (4–4)	Kile (5–10)		48,794	44–53
98	July 25	Cardinals	6–4	Luebbers (1–1)	Astacio (10–9)	Aybar (3)	48,845	44–54
99	July 26	Astros	8–5	Williams (1–1)	Veres (2–3)	Wagner (26)	42,740	44–55
100	July 27	Astros	6–3	Lima (14–5)	Bohanon (9–8)	Wagner (27)	41,952	44–56
101	July 28	Astros	16–8	Hampton (14–3)	Ramírez (1–3)		43,201	44–57
102	July 29	Astros	4–2	Kile (6–10)	Holt (2–10)	Veres (19)	43,415	45–57
103	July 30	@ Cardinals	5–4	Astacio (11–9)	Aybar (4–4)	Veres (20)	46,208	46–57
104	July 31	@ Cardinals	6–5	Painter (3–4)	Leskanic (3–2)	Bottalico (17)	46,849	46–58

August

#	Date	Opponent	Score	Win	Loss	Save	Attendance	Record
105	August 1	@ Cardinals	5–4	Bohanon (10–8)	Jiménez (5–11)	Veres (21)	45,906	47–58
106	August 3	@ Reds	2–1	Williamson (10–4)	DeJean (2–4)		22,516	47–59
107	August 4	@ Reds	6–3	Neagle (2–3)	Kile (6–11)	Graves (16)	22,314	47–60
108	August 5	@ Reds	2–1	Astacio (12–9)	Guzmán (5–10)		24,318	48–60
109	August 6	@ Marlins	9–1	Fernandez (6–7)	Jones (5–9)		14,032	48–61
110	August 7	@ Marlins	4–1	Meadows (9–11)	Bohanon (10–9)	Alfonseca (9)	18,469	48–62
111	August 8	@ Marlins	2–1	Dempster (5–6)	Wright (0–2)	Alfonseca (10)	17,691	48–63
112	August 9	@ Brewers	7–6	Wickman (3–5)	Veres (2–4)		17,463	48–64
113	August 10	@ Brewers	2–1 (10)	Coppinger (1–2)	Veres (2–5)		19,758	48–65
114	August 11	@ Brewers	8–5	Jones (6–9)	Woodard (11–7)		21,632	49–65
115	August 13	Expos	14–13 (10)	Urbina (6–4)	DiPoto (3–4)	Telford (2)	40,092	49–66
116	August 13	Expos	8–6	Vázquez (6–5)	Bohanon (10–10)	Urbina (27)	45,643	49–67
117	August 14	Expos	11–8	Kile (7–11)	Powell (1–5)	Veres (22)	46,739	50–67
118	August 15	Expos	8–2	Thomson (1–5)	Thurman (5–8)	Ramírez (1)	43,702	51–67
119	August 15	Expos	12–4	Astacio (13–9)	Bennett (0–1)		36,483	52–67
120	August 16	Braves	14–6	Maddux (15–6)	Jones (6–10)		47,519	52–68
121	August 17	Braves	3–2	Lee (2–0)	Mulholland (7–7)	Veres (23)	47,904	53–68
122	August 18	Braves	4–1	Veres (3–5)	Rocker (3–4)		46,553	54–68
123	August 19	Braves	9–7 (14)	Chen (2–2)	Lee (2–1)	Mulholland (1)	41,791	54–69
124	August 20	@ Cubs	11–3	Astacio (14–9)	Farnsworth (2–7)		40,130	55–69
125	August 21	@ Cubs	8–6	Bowie (1–3)	Thomson (1–6)	Adams (10)	40,087	55–70
126	August 22	@ Cubs	3–2	Wright (1–2)	Trachsel (4–15)	Veres (24)	38,424	56–70
127	August 24	@ Pirates	3–2	Leskanic (4–2)	Williams (2–4)	Veres (25)	13,221	57–70
128	August 25	@ Pirates	9–3	Peters (2–1)	Kile (7–12)		12,535	57–71
129	August 26	@ Pirates	8–4	Anderson (2–1)	Astacio (14–10)		12,649	57–72
	August 27	Phillies	Postponed (Rain; rescheduled for August 28)					57–72
130	August 28	Phillies	11–6	Lee (3–1)	Aldred (4–3)		42,744	58–72
131	August 28	Phillies	4–0	Bohanon (11–10)	Grahe (0–1)		47,217	59–72
132	August 29	Phillies	6–5	Kile (8–12)	Byrd (14–7)	Veres (26)	43,344	60–72
133	August 30	Pirates	11–8	Peters (3–1)	Ramírez (1–4)	Williams (22)	41,872	60–73
134	August 31	Pirates	9–8 (10)	Williams (3–4)	Lee (3–2)	Silva (2)	41,729	60–74

September

#	Date	Opponent	Score	Win	Loss	Save	Attendance	Record
135	September 1	Pirates	9–8	Sauerbeck (3–0)	Veres (3–6)	Clontz (1)	40,529	60–75
136	September 3	@ Mets	5–2 (10)	Leskanic (5–2)	Wendell (3–3)	Veres (27)	36,102	61–75
137	September 4	@ Mets	4–2	Leiter (11–9)	Bohanon (11–11)	Benítez (17)	43,431	61–76
138	September 5	@ Mets	6–2	Yoshii (10–8)	Kile (8–13)		49,117	61–77
139	September 6	@ Expos	5–3	Astacio (15–10)	Thurman (6–11)	Veres (28)	7,698	62–77
140	September 7	@ Expos	4–1	Hermanson (7–12)	Thomson (1–7)	Urbina (34)	5,517	62–78
141	September 8	@ Expos	5–1	Wright (2–2)	Smith (4–8)		5,548	63–78
142	September 10	Brewers	15–3	Bohanon (12–11)	Pulsipher (4–6)		44,628	64–78
143	September 11	Brewers	7–6	DiPoto (4–4)	Coppinger (3–4)	Veres (29)	44,566	65–78
144	September 12	Brewers	12–9	Plunk (4–3)	Veres (3–7)	Wickman (31)	42,085	65–79
145	September 13	Mets	6–5	Wendell (4–4)	Veres (3–8)	Benítez (20)	40,547	65–80
146	September 14	Mets	7–2	Wright (3–2)	Dotel (7–2)		41,090	66–80
147	September 15	Mets	10–5	Wendell (5–4)	DiPoto (4–5)	Benítez (21)	41,820	66–81
148	September 17	Dodgers	18–10	Hackman (1–0)	Checo (1–1)		44,170	67–81
149	September 18	Dodgers	5–4	Park (11–10)	Astacio (15–11)	Shaw (33)	44,945	67–82
150	September 19	Dodgers	5–2 (7)	Brown (17–8)	Thomson (1–8)	Borbón (1)	41,952	67–83
151	September 20	Diamondbacks	12–7	Wright (4–2)	Daal (15–9)		41,174	68–83
152	September 21	Diamondbacks	7–6	Olson (8–4)	Ramírez (1–5)	Mantei (30)	41,559	68–84
153	September 22	Diamondbacks	11–3	Benes (12–12)	Hackman (1–1)		40,115	68–85
154	September 24	@ Marlins	5–3	Astacio (16–11)	Edmondson (5–8)	Veres (30)	18,941	69–85
155	September 25	@ Marlins	8–2	Dempster (7–8)	Thomson (1–9)		27,271	69–86
156	September 26	@ Marlins	8–6	Leskanic (6–2)	Medina (1–1)	Veres (31)	26,012	70–86
157	September 27	@ Diamondbacks	10–3	Anderson (7–2)	Bohanon (12–12)		35,360	70–87
158	September 28	@ Diamondbacks	9–3	Benes (13–12)	Hackman (1–2)		31,447	70–88
159	September 29	@ Diamondbacks	4–1	Astacio (17–11)	Reynoso (10–6)		32,505	71–88

October

#	Date	Opponent	Score	Win	Loss	Save	Attendance	Record
160	October 1	Giants	9–4	Ortiz (18–9)	Thomson (1–10)		41,302	71–89
161	October 2	Giants	16–7	Rueter (15–10)	Wright (4–3)		38,393	71–90
162	October 3	Giants	9–8	Veres (4–8)	Embree (3–2)		40,117	72–90

== Awards, league leaders and accomplishments ==
=== National League leaders ===
==== Offensive statistics ====
- Batting champion: Larry Walker (.379) ^{†}
- Offensive win %: Larry Walker (.838) ^{†}
- On-base percentage: Larry Walker (.458) ^{†}
- On-base plus slugging percentage: Larry Walker (1.168) ^{†}
- Slugging percentage: Larry Walker (.710) ^{†}
- Triples: Neifi Pérez (11) ^{†}
- Notes: ^{†} – led MLB. References:

=== Honors ===
- Canada's athletes of the 20th century #9 male athlete: Larry Walker
- Sports Illustrated 13th Greatest Sporting Figure in Canadian History: Larry Walker

=== Awards ===
- All-Star Game selection: Larry Walker (starter at right field)
- Colorado Rockies Player of the Year: Larry Walker
- Rawlings Gold Glove at outfield: Larry Walker
- Silver Slugger at outfield: Larry Walker

== Farm system ==
Level	Team	League	Manager
AAA	Colorado Springs Sky Sox	Pacific Coast League	Bill Hayes
AA	Carolina Mudcats	Southern League	Jay Loviglio
A	Salem Avalanche	Carolina League	Ron Gideon
A	Asheville Tourists	South Atlantic League	Jim Eppard
A-Short Season	Portland Rockies	Northwest League	Alan Cockrell
Rookie	AZL Rockies	Arizona League	P. J. Carey

== See also ==
- List of Colorado Rockies team records
- List of Gold Glove Award winners at outfield
- List of Major League Baseball annual triples leaders
- List of Major League Baseball batting champions
- List of National League annual slugging percentage leaders
- List of Silver Slugger Award winners at outfield

Records
Preceded by 1998	Colorado Rockies seasons 1999	Succeeded by 2000
