= 1999 Philadelphia Phillies season =

Major League Baseball season

1999 Philadelphia Phillies
- League: National League
- Division: East
- Ballpark: Veterans Stadium
- City: Philadelphia
- Record: 77–85 (.475)
- Divisional place: 3rd
- Owners: Bill Giles
- General managers: Ed Wade
- Managers: Terry Francona
- Television: WPSG; CSN Philadelphia
- Radio: WPHT (Harry Kalas, Larry Andersen, Andy Musser, Chris Wheeler, Scott Graham)

The 1999 Philadelphia Phillies season was the 117th season in the history of the franchise.

== Offseason ==
- November 5, 1998: Torey Lovullo was signed as a free agent with the Philadelphia Phillies.
- November 9, 1998: Paul Spoljaric was traded by the Seattle Mariners to the Philadelphia Phillies for Mark Leiter.
- November 19, 1998: Ricky Bottalico was traded by the Philadelphia Phillies with Garrett Stephenson to the St. Louis Cardinals for Jeff Brantley, Ron Gant, and Cliff Politte.
- December 22, 1998: Rob Ducey was signed as a free agent with the Philadelphia Phillies.

== Regular season ==
The Phillies were early contenders for the wild card, going a season-high 13 games over .500 on August 6 (61–48), but injuries to pitching staff ace Curt Schilling and third baseman Scott Rolen, as well as a struggling bullpen, proved too tough to overcome. In one particularly bad stretch from August 28 to September 14, the Phillies went 1–18.

=== Season standings ===
NL East
Team	W	L	Pct.	GB	Home	Road
Atlanta Braves	103	59	.636	—	56‍–‍25	47‍–‍34
New York Mets	97	66	.595	6½	49‍–‍32	48‍–‍34
Philadelphia Phillies	77	85	.475	26	41‍–‍40	36‍–‍45
Montreal Expos	68	94	.420	35	35‍–‍46	33‍–‍48
Florida Marlins	64	98	.395	39	35‍–‍45	29‍–‍53

=== Record vs. opponents ===
1999 National League record Source: MLB Standings Grid – 1999
Team	AZ	ATL	CHC	CIN	COL	FLA	HOU	LAD	MIL	MON	NYM	PHI	PIT	SD	SF	STL	AL
Arizona	—	4–5	7–2	1–8	6–7	8–1	5–4	7–6	5–4	6–3	7–2	8–1	5–2	11–2	9–3	4–4	7–8
Atlanta	5–4	—	2–5	8–1	5–4	9–4	6–1	5–4	5–2	9–4	9–3	8–5	6–3	5–4	4–5	8–1	9–9
Chicago	2–7	5–2	—	5–8	4–5	6–3	3–9	2–7	6–6	2–5	3–6	2–7	7–6	6–3	1–7	7–5	6–9
Cincinnati	8–1	1–8	8–5	—	7–2	6–1	9–4	4–3	6–6	4–3	5–5	6–3	7–6	6–3	4–5	8–4	7–8
Colorado	7–6	4–5	5–4	2–7	—	5–4	2–6	8–5	6–3	6–3	4–5	5–4	2–7	4–9	4–9	4–5	4–8
Florida	1–8	4–9	3–6	1–6	4–5	—	2–7	7–2	5–4	8–4	3–10	2–11	3–4	3–6	4–5	3–4	11–7
Houston	4–5	1–6	9–3	4–9	6–2	7–2	—	6–3	8–5	7–2	4–5	6–1	5–7	8–1	5–4	5–7	12–3
Los Angeles	6–7	4–5	7–2	3–4	5–8	2–7	3–6	—	7–2	5–4	4–4	6–3	3–6	3–9	8–5	3–6	8–7
Milwaukee	4–5	2–5	6–6	6–6	3–6	4–5	5–8	2–7	—	5–4	2–5	5–4	8–4	3–5	4–5	7–6	8–6
Montreal	3–6	4–9	5–2	3–4	3–6	4–8	2–7	4–5	4–5	—	5–8	6–6	3–6	5–3	4–5	5–4	8–10
New York	2–7	3–9	6–3	5–5	5–4	10–3	5–4	4–4	5–2	8–5	—	6–6	7–2	7–2	7–2	5–2	12–6
Philadelphia	1–8	5–8	7–2	3–6	4–5	11–2	1–6	3–6	4–5	6–6	6–6	—	3–4	6–3	2–6	4–5	11–7
Pittsburgh	2–5	3–6	6–7	6–7	7–2	4–3	7–5	6–3	4–8	6–3	2–7	4–3	—	3–6	4–5	7–5	7–8
San Diego	2–11	4–5	3–6	3–6	9–4	6–3	1–8	9–3	5–3	3–5	2–7	3–6	6–3	—	5–7	2–7	11–4
San Francisco	3–9	5–4	7–1	5–4	9–4	5–4	4–5	5–8	5–4	5–4	2–7	6–2	5–4	7–5	—	6–3	7–8
St. Louis	4–4	1–8	5–7	4–8	5–4	4–3	7–5	6–3	6–7	4–5	2–5	5–4	5–7	7–2	3–6	—	7–8

=== Transactions ===
- May 5, 1999: Paul Spoljaric was traded by the Philadelphia Phillies to the Toronto Blue Jays for Robert Person.
- June 2, 1999: Brett Myers was drafted by the Philadelphia Phillies in the 1st round (12th pick) of the 1999 amateur draft. Player signed July 9, 1999.
- June 2, 1999: Marlon Byrd was drafted by the Philadelphia Phillies in the 10th round of the 1999 amateur draft. Player signed June 4, 1999.

=== 1999 Game Log ===
Legend
	Phillies win
	Phillies loss
	Postponement
**Bold**	Phillies team member

1999 Game Log
Overall Record: 77–85
April (11–11)

#	Date	Opponent	Score	Win	Loss	Save	Attendance	Record
1	April 5	@ Braves	7–4	**Curt Schilling** (1–0)	Tom Glavine (0–1)	**Jeff Brantley** (1)	47,522	1–0
2	April 6	@ Braves	3–11	Greg Maddux (1–0)	**Chad Ogea** (0–1)	Derrin Ebert (1)	29,183	1–1
3	April 7	@ Braves	0–4	John Smoltz (1–0)	**Carlton Loewer** (0–1)	None	32,164	1–2
4	April 8	@ Braves	6–3	**Paul Byrd** (1–0)	Kevin Millwood (0–1)	**Jeff Brantley** (2)	47,225	2–2
5	April 9	@ Marlins	4–7	Brian Meadows (1–0)	**Paul Spoljaric** (0–1)	None	13,229	2–3
6	April 10	@ Marlins	5–2	**Curt Schilling** (2–0)	Dennis Springer (0–1)	**Jeff Brantley** (3)	22,776	3–3
7	April 11	@ Marlins	2–1	**Chad Ogea** (1–1)	Alex Fernandez (1–1)	**Jeff Brantley** (4)	14,954	4–3
8	April 12	Braves	6–8	Mike Cather (1–0)	**Ken Ryan** (0–1)	Rudy Seánez (1)	37,582	4–4
9	April 14	Braves	4–10	Kevin Millwood (1–1)	**Paul Byrd** (1–1)	None	16,287	4–5
–	April 15	Braves	Postponed (rain); Makeup: July 23 as a traditional double-header					
10	April 16	Marlins	17–3	**Curt Schilling** (3–0)	Dennis Springer (0–2)	None	12,079	5–5
11	April 17	Marlins	2–1	**Wayne Gomes** (1–0)	Antonio Alfonseca (0–1)	None	14,817	6–5
12	April 18	Marlins	7–5	**Carlton Loewer** (1–1)	Kirt Ojala (0–1)	None	17,176	7–5
13	April 19	@ Diamondbacks	2–3	Omar Daal (2–0)	**Yorkis Pérez** (0–1)	Greg Swindell (1)	29,704	7–6
14	April 20	@ Diamondbacks	1–8	Randy Johnson (2–1)	**Paul Spoljaric** (0–2)	None	30,546	7–7
15	April 21	@ Diamondbacks	2–4	Todd Stottlemyre (2–0)	**Curt Schilling** (3–1)	Gregg Olson (1)	31,421	7–8
16	April 23	@ Expos	6–2	**Chad Ogea** (2–1)	Dustin Hermanson (2–1)	None	8,818	8–8
17	April 24	@ Expos	6–5	**Mike Grace** (1–0)	Bobby Ayala (0–2)	**Wayne Gomes** (1)	8,212	9–8
18	April 25	@ Expos	8–6	**Paul Byrd** (2–1)	Ugueth Urbina (1–2)	None	9,280	10–8
19	April 27	Reds	1–0 (10)	**Jeff Brantley** (1–0)	Gabe White (0–2)	None	14,114	11–8
20	April 28	Reds	8–12	Scott Williamson (1–1)	**Jeff Brantley** (1–1)	None	12,354	11–9
21	April 29	Reds	3–7	Jason Bere (2–0)	**Carlton Loewer** (1–2)	None	12,248	11–10
22	April 30	Dodgers	3–4	Carlos Pérez (1–3)	**Paul Byrd** (2–2)	Jeff Shaw (7)	20,024	11–11

May (14–13)

#	Date	Opponent	Score	Win	Loss	Save	Attendance	Record
23	May 1	Dodgers	6–12	Darren Dreifort (4–1)	**Paul Spoljaric** (0–3)	None	22,053	11–12
24	May 2	Dodgers	12–3	**Curt Schilling** (4–1)	Kevin Brown (2–2)	None	34,608	12–12
25	May 3	Padres	3–9	Sterling Hitchcock (2–1)	**Chad Ogea** (2–2)	None	11,032	12–13
26	May 4	Padres	3–0	**Carlton Loewer** (2–2)	Woody Williams (1–1)	None	15,183	13–13
27	May 5	Padres	11–1	**Paul Byrd** (3–2)	Stan Spencer (0–4)	None	18,229	14–13
28	May 7	@ Rockies	8–1	**Curt Schilling** (5–1)	John Thomson (0–4)	None	41,465	15–13
29	May 8	@ Rockies	7–2	**Joel Bennett** (1–0)	Brian Bohanon (5–1)	None	43,340	16–13
30	May 9	@ Rockies	10–8	**Ken Ryan** (1–1)	Dave Veres (1–2)	**Wayne Gomes** (2)	40,251	17–13
31	May 10	@ Cardinals	2–5	Kent Bottenfield (5–1)	**Carlton Loewer** (2–3)	Scott Radinsky (3)	34,789	17–14
32	May 11	@ Cardinals	9–4	**Paul Byrd** (4–2)	Kent Mercker (2–2)	None	32,307	18–14
33	May 12	@ Cardinals	8–4	**Curt Schilling** (6–1)	Darren Oliver (2–2)	None	45,540	19–14
34	May 14	Mets	3–7	Masato Yoshii (3–3)	**Chad Ogea** (2–3)	None	21,074	19–15
35	May 15	Mets	7–9	Pat Mahomes (1–0)	**Ken Ryan** (1–2)	John Franco (11)	27,039	19–16
36	May 15	Mets	5–2	**Paul Byrd** (5–2)	Orel Hershiser (2–4)	**Jeff Brantley** (5)	28,422	20–16
37	May 17	@ Expos	4–3	**Curt Schilling** (7–1)	Mike Thurman (0–3)	None	5,104	21–16
38	May 18	@ Expos	4–7	Miguel Batista (3–1)	**Joel Bennett** (1–1)	Ugueth Urbina (7)	4,660	21–17
39	May 19	@ Expos	9–10	Steve Kline (1–1)	**Jeff Brantley** (1–2)	None	5,182	21–18
40	May 21	@ Mets	5–7	Orel Hershiser (3–4)	**Carlton Loewer** (2–4)	John Franco (13)	24,554	21–19
41	May 22	@ Mets	9–3	**Paul Byrd** (6–2)	Bobby J. Jones (3–3)	None	34,575	22–19
42	May 23	@ Mets	4–5	Rigo Beltrán (1–0)	**Curt Schilling** (7–2)	None	34,950	22–20
43	May 24	Expos	5–4	**Yorkis Pérez** (1–1)	Miguel Batista (3–2)	**Wayne Gomes** (3)	13,953	23–20
44	May 25	Expos	2–4 (11)	Ugueth Urbina (3–4)	**Steve Montgomery** (0–1)	None	15,876	23–21
45	May 26	Expos	2–5	Carl Pavano (3–5)	**Carlton Loewer** (2–5)	Ugueth Urbina (8)	13,168	23–22
46	May 28	Rockies	3–5	Curtis Leskanic (2–1)	**Paul Byrd** (6–3)	Dave Veres (6)	16,365	23–23
47	May 29	Rockies	2–0	**Curt Schilling** (8–2)	Brian Bohanon (6–3)	None	22,204	24–23
48	May 30	Rockies	0–1	Darryl Kile (4–3)	**Jim Poole** (0–1)	Dave Veres (7)	30,358	24–24
49	May 31	Giants	4–3	**Yorkis Pérez** (2–1)	John Johnstone (4–2)	**Wayne Gomes** (4)	16,323	25–24

June (15–12)

#	Date	Opponent	Score	Win	Loss	Save	Attendance	Record
50	June 1	Giants	5–6 (12)	Robb Nen (2–1)	**Wayne Gomes** (1–1)	None	13,050	25–25
51	June 2	Giants	7–6	**Paul Byrd** (7–3)	Russ Ortiz (6–4)	**Wayne Gomes** (5)	13,616	26–25
52	June 3	Giants	4–7	Jerry Spradlin (1–1)	**Curt Schilling** (8–3)	Robb Nen (16)	20,560	26–26
53	June 4	@ Orioles	9–5	**Chad Ogea** (3–3)	Scott Erickson (1–8)	None	47,542	27–26
54	June 5	@ Orioles	6–7 (10)	Mike Timlin (2–4)	**Steve Montgomery** (0–2)	None	48,531	27–27
55	June 6	@ Orioles	11–7	**Joel Bennett** (2–1)	Ricky Bones (0–2)	None	47,833	28–27
56	June 7	Yankees	6–5	**Paul Byrd** (8–3)	Andy Pettitte (3–4)	None	37,180	29–27
57	June 8	Yankees	11–5	**Yorkis Pérez** (3–1)	Jason Grimsley (5–1)	None	44,444	30–27
58	June 9	Yankees	5–11	David Cone (6–2)	**Chad Ogea** (3–4)	None	42,047	30–28
59	June 11	Blue Jays	8–4	**Randy Wolf** (1–0)	Joey Hamilton (0–4)	None	26,541	31–28
60	June 12	Blue Jays	7–2	**Paul Byrd** (9–3)	Kelvim Escobar (5–4)	None	20,449	32–28
61	June 13	Blue Jays	2–7	Pat Hentgen (5–5)	**Curt Schilling** (8–4)	None	28,459	32–29
62	June 15	@ Padres	1–6	Matt Clement (2–7)	**Chad Ogea** (3–5)	None	16,134	32–30
63	June 16	@ Padres	4–2	**Randy Wolf** (2–0)	Sterling Hitchcock (4–6)	**Wayne Gomes** (6)	15,136	33–30
64	June 17	@ Padres	7–5	**Paul Byrd** (10–3)	Woody Williams (2–5)	**Wayne Gomes** (7)	16,671	34–30
65	June 18	@ Dodgers	2–1	**Curt Schilling** (9–4)	Ismael Valdez (5–6)	**Wayne Gomes** (8)	41,590	35–30
66	June 19	@ Dodgers	1–8	Darren Dreifort (6–5)	**Robert Person** (0–3)	None	32,315	35–31
67	June 20	@ Dodgers	2–3	Kevin Brown (8–4)	**Chad Ogea** (3–6)	Jeff Shaw (16)	46,347	35–32
68	June 22	Pirates	3–2	**Randy Wolf** (3–0)	Francisco Córdova (2–3)	**Wayne Gomes** (9)	18,835	36–32
69	June 23	Pirates	6–8	Kris Benson (6–5)	**Paul Byrd** (10–4)	Mike Williams (13)	20,256	36–33
70	June 24	Pirates	7–5	**Curt Schilling** (10–4)	José Silva (2–5)	**Wayne Gomes** (10)	25,848	37–33
71	June 25	@ Cubs	3–2	**Chad Ogea** (4–6)	Jon Lieber (6–3)	**Wayne Gomes** (11)	40,553	38–33
72	June 26	@ Cubs	6–2	**Robert Person** (1–3)	Steve Trachsel (2–10)	None	40,466	39–33
73	June 27	@ Cubs	7–13	Terry Mulholland (4–3)	**Mike Grace** (1–1)	None	38,455	39–34
74	June 28	@ Pirates	2–3 (10)	Greg Hansell (1–0)	**Steve Montgomery** (0–3)	None	14,144	39–35
75	June 29	@ Pirates	7–4	**Curt Schilling** (11–4)	José Silva (2–6)	None	16,343	40–35
76	June 30	@ Pirates	1–9	Jason Schmidt (8–5)	**Chad Ogea** (4–7)	None	14,526	40–36

July (17–11)

#	Date	Opponent	Score	Win	Loss	Save	Attendance	Record
77	July 1	@ Pirates	7–12	Todd Ritchie (7–6)	**Robert Person** (1–4)	None	11,174	40–37
78	July 2	Cubs	14–1	**Randy Wolf** (4–0)	Terry Mulholland (4–4)	None	50,498	41–37
79	July 3	Cubs	21–8	**Paul Byrd** (11–4)	Kyle Farnsworth (2–3)	None	58,086	42–37
80	July 4	Cubs	6–2	**Curt Schilling** (12–4)	Kevin Tapani (6–5)	None	20,097	43–37
81	July 5	Brewers	0–5	Jim Abbott (2–7)	**Chad Ogea** (4–8)	Rafael Roque (1)	13,248	43–38
82	July 6	Brewers	1–0	**Robert Person** (2–4)	Hideo Nomo (6–2)	**Wayne Gomes** (12)	13,006	44–38
83	July 7	Brewers	5–4	**Wayne Gomes** (2–1)	Bob Wickman (2–4)	None	16,593	45–38
84	July 9	Orioles	4–2	**Curt Schilling** (13–4)	Juan Guzmán (4–7)	None	28,182	46–38
85	July 10	Orioles	4–8	Mike Mussina (11–4)	**Paul Byrd** (11–5)	None	32,300	46–39
86	July 11	Orioles	2–6	Scott Erickson (4–8)	**Chad Ogea** (4–9)	None	33,399	46–40
–	July 13	**1999 Major League Baseball All-Star Game at Fenway Park in Boston**						
87	July 15	@ Red Sox	4–6	Brian Rose (5–2)	**Paul Byrd** (11–6)	Tim Wakefield (11)	32,397	46–41
88	July 16	@ Red Sox	5–4	**Robert Person** (3–4)	Bret Saberhagen (6–3)	**Wayne Gomes** (13)	32,899	47–41
89	July 17	@ Red Sox	11–3	**Randy Wolf** (5–0)	Mark Portugal (5–7)	None	32,228	48–41
90	July 18	@ Devil Rays	3–2	**Curt Schilling** (14–4)	Albie Lopez (1–2)	None	20,075	49–41
91	July 19	@ Devil Rays	16–3	**Chad Ogea** (5–9)	Bryan Rekar (6–5)	None	17,600	50–41
92	July 20	@ Devil Rays	4–5 (13)	Norm Charlton (1–2)	**Steve Schrenk** (0–1)	None	30,868	50–42
93	July 21	@ Brewers	7–0	**Robert Person** (4–4)	Scott Karl (7–8)	**Jim Poole** (1)	21,933	51–42
94	July 22	@ Brewers	0–5	Hideo Nomo (9–2)	**Randy Wolf** (5–1)	None	29,777	51–43
95	July 23 (1)	Braves	6–5	**Amaury Telemaco** (2–0)	Rudy Seánez (5–1)	**Wayne Gomes** (14)	see 2nd game	52–43
96	July 23 (2)	Braves	1–3	Bruce Chen (1–1)	**Anthony Shumaker** (0–1)	John Rocker (20)	32,673	52–44
97	July 24	Braves	4–3	**Steve Montgomery** (1–3)	Micah Bowie (0–1)	**Wayne Gomes** (15)	30,167	53–44
98	July 25	Braves	4–5 (10)	John Rocker (3–3)	**Steve Montgomery** (1–4)	None	25,659	53–45
99	July 26	Marlins	9–1	**Robert Person** (5–4)	Vladimir Núñez (4–4)	None	16,047	54–45
100	July 27	Marlins	2–6	Alex Fernandez (5–6)	**Randy Wolf** (5–2)	Antonio Alfonseca (7)	18,282	54–46
101	July 28	Marlins	9–4	**Steve Schrenk** (1–1)	Ryan Dempster (4–6)	None	17,497	55–46
102	July 29	Marlins	12–1	**Chad Ogea** (6–9)	Brian Meadows (8–11)	None	26,834	56–46
103	July 30	@ Braves	9–2	**Paul Byrd** (12–6)	John Smoltz (8–4)	None	48,605	57–46
104	July 31	@ Braves	6–8	Tom Glavine (9–9)	**Robert Person** (5–5)	John Rocker (21)	50,203	57–47

August (10–17)

#	Date	Opponent	Score	Win	Loss	Save	Attendance	Record
105	August 1	@ Braves	4–12	Greg Maddux (12–6)	**Randy Wolf** (5–3)	None	37,521	57–48
106	August 3	@ Marlins	6–5	**Amaury Telemaco** (3–0)	Brian Edmondson (4–6)	**Wayne Gomes** (16)	10,223	58–48
107	August 4	@ Marlins	4–1	**Paul Byrd** (13–6)	Dennis Springer (5–11)	**Steve Schrenk** (1)	10,445	59–48
108	August 5	@ Marlins	9–3	**Robert Person** (6–5)	Vladimir Núñez (4–5)	None	9,610	60–48
109	August 6	Diamondbacks	4–2 (11)	**Wayne Gomes** (3–1)	Bobby Chouinard (4–2)	None	27,742	61–48
110	August 7	Diamondbacks	2–8	Andy Benes (7–10)	**Curt Schilling** (14–5)	None	18,766	61–49
111	August 8	Diamondbacks	4–7	Armando Reynoso (8–1)	**Chad Ogea** (6–10)	Matt Mantei (19)	32,047	61–50
112	August 9	Cardinals	6–12	Kent Mercker (5–4)	**Steve Schrenk** (1–2)	None	46,102	61–51
113	August 10	Cardinals	7–5	**Jim Poole** (1–1)	Ricky Bottalico (1–6)	**Wayne Gomes** (17)	48,514	62–51
114	August 11	Cardinals	1–5	Garrett Stephenson (3–0)	**Randy Wolf** (5–4)	Heathcliff Slocumb (2)	45,830	62–52
115	August 13	@ Reds	4–5	Scott Williamson (11–5)	**Steve Schrenk** (1–3)	None	26,353	62–53
116	August 14	@ Reds	1–4	Pete Harnisch (12–6)	**Chad Ogea** (6–11)	Danny Graves (17)	25,214	62–54
117	August 15	@ Reds	9–3	**Robert Person** (7–5)	Denny Neagle (3–4)	None	27,059	63–54
118	August 16	@ Cardinals	3–4	Kent Mercker (6–4)	**Randy Wolf** (5–5)	Ricky Bottalico (18)	36,741	63–55
119	August 17	@ Cardinals	5–6	Juan Acevedo (5–4)	**Wayne Gomes** (3–2)	None	38,557	63–56
120	August 18	@ Cardinals	6–5	**Scott Aldred** (4–2)	Rich Croushore (3–3)	**Wayne Gomes** (18)	38,047	64–56
121	August 20	Dodgers	5–8 (10)	Alan Mills (3–4)	**Wayne Gomes** (3–3)	None	17,444	64–57
122	August 21	Dodgers	6–5 (11)	**Wayne Gomes** (4–3)	Onan Masaoka (2–3)	None	22,078	65–57
123	August 22	Dodgers	7–9	Chan Ho Park (7–10)	**Anthony Shumaker** (0–2)	Jeff Shaw (25)	22,510	65–58
124	August 23	Padres	6–7	Woody Williams (7–11)	**Chad Ogea** (6–12)	Trevor Hoffman (32)	18,759	65–59
125	August 24	Padres	18–2	**Paul Byrd** (14–6)	Stan Spencer (0–7)	None	18,126	66–59
126	August 25	Padres	15–1	**Robert Person** (8–5)	Matt Clement (6–12)	None	25,539	67–59
–	August 27	@ Rockies	Postponed (rain); Makeup: August 28 as a day-night double-header					
127	August 28 (1)	@ Rockies	6–11	David Lee (3–1)	**Scott Aldred** (4–3)	None	42,744	67–60
128	August 28 (2)	@ Rockies	0–4	Brian Bohanon (11–10)	**Joe Grahe** (0–1)	None	47,217	67–61
129	August 29	@ Rockies	5–6	Darryl Kile (8–12)	**Paul Byrd** (14–7)	Dave Veres (26)	43,344	67–62
130	August 30	@ Giants	4–6 (10)	Rich Rodriguez (1–0)	**Billy Brewer** (0–1)	None	13,193	67–63
131	August 31	@ Giants	1–8	Kirk Rueter (13–7)	**Randy Wolf** (5–6)	None	13,106	67–64

September (9–19)

#	Date	Opponent	Score	Win	Loss	Save	Attendance	Record
132	September 1	@ Giants	3–5 (11)	Rich Rodriguez (2–0)	**Wayne Gomes** (4–4)	None	11,156	67–65
133	September 2	@ Giants	2–3	Joe Nathan (5–3)	**Joe Grahe** (0–2)	Robb Nen (31)	12,299	67–66
134	September 3	Reds	10–2	**Curt Schilling** (15–5)	Steve Parris (7–2)	None	14,447	68–66
135	September 4	Reds	3–22	Pete Harnisch (14–8)	**Paul Byrd** (14–8)	Stan Belinda (2)	16,357	68–67
136	September 5	Reds	7–9	Denny Neagle (5–5)	**Robert Person** (8–6)	Scott Sullivan (3)	18,839	68–68
137	September 6	Astros	5–6	José Lima (19–7)	**Randy Wolf** (5–7)	Billy Wagner (34)	12,223	68–69
138	September 7	Astros	6–8	Jay Powell (5–4)	**Wayne Gomes** (4–5)	Doug Henry (1)	12,934	68–70
139	September 8	Astros	2–10	Mike Hampton (19–3)	**Curt Schilling** (15–6)	None	14,050	68–71
140	September 9	Astros	1–3	Shane Reynolds (15–11)	**Steve Montgomery** (1–5)	Billy Wagner (35)	11,133	68–72
141	September 10	@ Diamondbacks	1–3	Randy Johnson (15–9)	**Robert Person** (8–7)	None	34,700	68–73
142	September 11	@ Diamondbacks	0–4	Andy Benes (11–11)	**Randy Wolf** (5–8)	None	42,442	68–74
143	September 12	@ Diamondbacks	0–5	Todd Stottlemyre (6–2)	**Mike Grace** (1–2)	None	32,468	68–75
144	September 13	@ Astros	2–13	Mike Hampton (20–3)	**Joe Grahe** (0–3)	None	44,399	68–76
145	September 14	@ Astros	2–12	Shane Reynolds (16–11)	**Paul Byrd** (14–9)	None	25,164	68–77
146	September 15	@ Astros	8–6 (10)	**Wayne Gomes** (5–5)	Doug Henry (2–3)	**Billy Brewer** (1)		69–77
147	September 17	@ Mets	8–5	**Randy Wolf** (6–8)	Al Leiter (11–11)	**Billy Brewer** (2)	31,842	70–77
148	September 18	@ Mets	1–11	Masato Yoshii (12–8)	**Mike Grace** (1–3)	None	37,655	70–78
149	September 19	@ Mets	6–8	Octavio Dotel (8–2)	**Paul Byrd** (14–10)	Armando Benítez (22)	51,560	70–79
150	September 20	@ Brewers	4–5	Rocky Coppinger (4–4)	**Carlton Loewer** (2–6)	Bob Wickman (34)	10,981	70–80
151	September 21	@ Brewers	6–8	Bill Pulsipher (5–6)	**Anthony Shumaker** (0–3)	Bob Wickman (35)	11,371	70–81
152	September 22	@ Brewers	12–3	**Amaury Telemaco** (4–0)	Kyle Peterson (2–7)	None	13,043	71–81
153	September 23	@ Brewers	6–11	Jason Bere (4–0)	**Mike Grace** (1–4)	None		71–82
154	September 24	Mets	3–2	**Joe Grahe** (1–3)	Armando Benítez (3–3)	**Scott Aldred** (1)	21,649	72–82
155	September 25	Mets	4–2	**Robert Person** (9–7)	Kenny Rogers (10–4)	**Wayne Gomes** (19)	23,319	73–82
156	September 26	Mets	3–2	**Paul Byrd** (15–10)	Rick Reed (10–5)	**Steve Montgomery** (1)	26,370	74–82
157	September 28	Cubs	2–8	Steve Trachsel (8–17)	**Randy Wolf** (6–9)	None	16,106	74–83
158	September 29	Cubs	5–0	**Billy Brewer** (1–1)	Micah Bowie (2–7)	None	21,142	75–83
159	September 30	Cubs	2–1	**Robert Person** (10–7)	Brian McNichol (0–2)	**Steve Montgomery** (2)	17,475	76–83

October (1–2)

#	Date	Opponent	Score	Win	Loss	Save	Attendance	Record
160	October 1	Expos	4–7	Javier Vázquez (9–8)	**Joe Grahe** (1–4)	Ugueth Urbina (41)	12,652	76–84
161	October 2	Expos	3–13	Jeremy Powell (4–8)	**Paul Byrd** (15–11)	Miguel Batista (1)	12,871	77–84
162	October 3	Expos	6–5	**Cliff Politte** (1–0)	Scott Strickland (0–1)	**Steve Montgomery** (3)	23,892	77–85

=== Roster ===
1999 Philadelphia Phillies
**Roster**
**Pitchers**: 30 Scott Aldred; 37 Joel Bennett; 45 Jeff Brantley; 49 Billy Brewer; 34 Paul Byrd; 61 Wayne Gomes; 44 Mike Grace; 50 Joe Grahe; 46 Carlton Loewer; 57 Steve Montgomery; 33 Chad Ogea; 48 Yorkis Pérez; 31 Robert Person; 35 Cliff Politte; 41 Jim Poole; 51 Ken Ryan; 38 Curt Schilling; 52 Steve Schrenk; 37 Anthony Shumaker; 50 Paul Spoljaric; 47 Amaury Telemaco; 54 Randy Wolf	**Catchers**: 14 Gary Bennett; 27 Bobby Estalella; 24 Mike Lieberthal; 12 Tom Prince; **Infielders**: 16 Marlon Anderson; 26 Alex Arias; 2 Rico Brogna; 19 Domingo Cedeño; 15 David Doster; 23 Kevin Jordan; 4 Torey Lovullo; 8 Desi Relaford; 17 Scott Rolen	**Outfielders**: 53 Bobby Abreu; 25 Rob Ducey; 5 Ron Gant; 6 Doug Glanville; 29 Wendell Magee; 11 Kevin Sefcik	**Manager**: 7 Terry Francona; **Coaches**: 43 Galen Cisco (Pitching); 3 Chuck Cottier; 59 Ramon Henderson (Bullpen); 56 Hal McRae (Batting); 9 Brad Mills (First Base); 18 John Vukovich

== Player stats ==
=== Batting ===
==== Starters by position ====
Note: Pos = Position; G = Games played; AB = At bats; H = Hits; Avg. = Batting average; HR = Home runs; RBI = Runs batted in

Pos	Player	G	AB	H	Avg.	HR	RBI
C	Mike Lieberthal	145	510	153	.300	31	96
1B	Rico Brogna	157	619	172	.278	24	102
2B	Marlon Anderson	129	452	114	.252	5	54
SS	Alex Arias	118	347	105	.303	4	48
3B	Scott Rolen	112	421	113	.268	26	77
LF	Ron Gant	138	516	134	.260	17	77
CF	Doug Glanville	150	628	204	.325	11	73
RF	Bobby Abreu	152	546	183	.335	20	93

==== Other batters ====
Note: G = Games played; AB = At bats; H = Hits; Avg. = Batting average; HR = Home runs; RBI = Runs batt\ed in

Player	G	AB	H	Avg.	HR	RBI
Kevin Jordan	120	347	99	.285	4	51
Desi Relaford	65	211	51	.242	1	26
Kevin Sefcik	111	209	58	.278	1	11
Rob Ducey	104	188	49	.261	8	33
David Doster	99	97	19	.196	3	10
Gary Bennett	36	88	24	.273	1	21
Domingo Cedeño	32	66	10	.152	1	5
Torey Lovullo	17	38	8	.211	2	5
Bobby Estalella	9	18	3	.167	0	1
Wendell Magee	12	14	5	.357	2	5
Tom Prince	4	6	1	.167	0	0

=== Pitching ===
==== Starting pitchers ====
Note: G = Games pitched; IP = Innings pitched; W = Wins; L = Losses; ERA = Earned run average; SO = Strikeouts

Player	G	IP	W	L	ERA	SO
Paul Byrd	32	199.2	15	11	4.60	106
Curt Schilling	24	180.1	15	6	3.54	152
Chad Ogea	36	168.0	6	12	5.63	77
Robert Person	31	137.0	10	5	4.27	127
Randy Wolf	22	121.2	6	9	5.55	116

==== Other pitchers ====
Note: G = Games pitched; IP = Innings pitched; W = Wins; L = Losses; ERA = Earned run average; SO = Strikeouts

Player	G	IP	W	L	ERA	SO
Carlton Loewer	20	89.2	2	6	5.12	48
Mike Grace	27	55.0	1	4	7.69	28
Joe Grahe	13	32.2	1	4	3.86	16
Anthony Shumaker	8	22.2	0	3	5.96	17
Joel Bennett	5	17.0	2	1	9.00	13
Paul Spoljaric	5	11.1	0	3	15.09	10

==== Relief pitchers ====
Note: G = Games pitched; W = Wins; L = Losses; SV = Saves; ERA = Earned run average; SO = Strikeouts

Player	G	W	L	SV	ERA	SO
Wayne Gomes	73	5	5	19	4.26	58
Steve Montgomery	53	1	5	3	3.34	55
Jim Poole	51	1	1	1	4.33	22
Amaury Telemaco	44	3	0	0	5.55	41
Yorkis Pérez	35	3	1	0	3.94	26
Steve Schrenk	32	1	3	1	4.29	36
Scott Aldred	29	1	1	1	3.90	19
Billy Brewer	25	1	1	2	7.01	28
Ken Ryan	15	1	2	0	6.32	9
Cliff Politte	13	1	0	0	7.13	15
Jeff Brantley	10	1	2	5	5.19	11

== Farm system ==
Level	Team	League	Manager
AAA	Scranton/Wilkes-Barre; Red Barons	International League	Marc Bombard
AA	Reading Phillies	Eastern League	Gary Varsho
A	Clearwater Phillies	Florida State League	Bill Dancy
A	Piedmont Boll Weevils	South Atlantic League	Ken Oberkfell
A-Short Season	Batavia Muckdogs	New York–Penn League	Greg Legg
Rookie	GCL Phillies	Gulf Coast League	Ramón Avilés
