= 1995 New York Mets season =

1995 New York Mets
- League: National League
- Division: East
- Ballpark: Shea Stadium
- City: New York City, New York
- Record: 69–75 (.479)
- Divisional place: 2nd
- Owners: Fred Wilpon and Nelson Doubleday, Jr.
- General manager: Joe McIlvaine
- Manager: Dallas Green
- Television: WWOR-TV/SportsChannel New York (Ralph Kiner, Tim McCarver, Fran Healy, Rusty Staub, Gary Thorne)
- Radio: WFAN (Bob Murphy, Gary Cohen, Howie Rose); WXLX (Spanish) (Juan Alicea, Renato Morffi)
- Stats: ESPN.com; Baseball Reference

The 1995 New York Mets season was the 34th regular season for the Mets. They went 69–75 and finished second in the National League East, twenty-one games behind the first place Atlanta Braves. The Mets were managed by Dallas Green. They played home games at Shea Stadium.

== Offseason ==
- November 18, 1994: Paul Byrd was traded by the Cleveland Indians with a player to be named later, Jerry Dipoto, and Dave Mlicki to the New York Mets for Jeromy Burnitz and Joe Roa. The Cleveland Indians sent Jesus Azuaje (minors) (December 6, 1994) to the New York Mets to complete the trade.
- December 7, 1994: Jarvis Brown was signed as a free agent with the New York Mets.

== Regular season ==
Although the Mets failed to finish above .500 for the fourth consecutive season, their second-place finish was the highest they had placed since 1990. Despite their sub-.500 finish, the Mets were the only team to post a winning season series against the division- and league-champion Braves, going 8–5 against them, and they finished the year with a positive run differential of +39 (657 runs scored, 618 allowed).

After three and a half seasons, the Mets parted ways with Bobby Bonilla. The former All-Star turned lightning rod for fan criticism was dealt to the Baltimore Orioles at the trade deadline. Shortly thereafter, the Mets traded their other big acquisition from the infamous 1991–92 offseason and sent pitcher Bret Saberhagen to the Colorado Rockies.

1995 saw the emergence of Rico Brogna, to that point a backup infielder, as a major contributor to the Mets lineup. Installed as the team's first baseman, Brogna led the team with a .289 average while recording 22 home runs and 79 RBI. Second baseman Jeff Kent continued to provide power as he once again reached the 20-home run mark. José Vizcaíno led the team in hits and posted a .287 average. As far as starting pitching went, there was not as much positive to say. Bobby Jones' 10 wins led the team and Dave Mlicki's 9–7 record was the only other plus-.500 mark among Met starters.

=== Season standings ===
NL East
Team	W	L	Pct.	GB	Home	Road
Atlanta Braves	90	54	.625	—	44‍–‍28	46‍–‍26
New York Mets	69	75	.479	21	40‍–‍32	29‍–‍43
Philadelphia Phillies	69	75	.479	21	35‍–‍37	34‍–‍38
Florida Marlins	67	76	.469	22½	37‍–‍34	30‍–‍42
Montreal Expos	66	78	.458	24	31‍–‍41	35‍–‍37

=== Record vs. opponents ===
1995 National League record Source: MLB Standings Grid – 1995
Team	ATL	CHC	CIN	COL	FLA	HOU	LAD	MON	NYM	PHI	PIT	SD	SF	STL
Atlanta	—	8–4	8–5	9–4	10–3	6–6	5–4	9–4	5–8	7–6	4–2	5–2	7–1	7–5
Chicago	4–8	—	3–7	6–7	8–4	5–8	7–5	3–5	4–3	6–1	8–5	5–7	5–7	9–4
Cincinnati	5–8	7–3	—	5–7	6–6	12–1	4–3	8–4	7–5	9–3	8–5	3–6	3–3	8–5
Colorado	4–9	7–6	7–5	—	5–7	4–4	4–9	7–1	5–4	4–2	8–4	9–4	8–5	5–7
Florida	3–10	4–8	6–6	7–5	—	8–4	3–7	6–7	7–6	6–7	5–8	3–2	5–3	4–3
Houston	6–6	8–5	1–12	4–4	4–8	—	3–2	9–3	6–6	5–7	9–4	7–4	5–3	9–4
Los Angeles	4–5	5–7	3–4	9–4	7–3	2–3	—	7–5	6–6	4–9	9–4	7–6	8–5	7–5
Montreal	4–9	5–3	4–8	1–7	7–6	3–9	5–7	—	7–6	8–5	4–4	7–5	7–6	4–3
New York	8–5	3–4	5–7	4–5	6–7	6–6	6–6	6–7	—	7–6	4–3	6–7	5–8	3–4
Philadelphia	6-7	1–6	3–9	2–4	7–6	7–5	9–4	5–8	6–7	—	6–3	6–6	6–6	5–4
Pittsburgh	2–4	5–8	5–8	4–8	8–5	4–9	4–9	4–4	3–4	3–6	—	4–8	6–6	6–7
San Diego	2–5	7–5	6–3	4–9	2–3	4–7	6–7	5–7	7–6	6–6	8–4	—	6–7	7–5
San Francisco	1–7	7–5	3–3	5–8	3–5	3–5	5–8	6–7	8–5	6–6	6–6	7–6	—	7–6
St. Louis	5–7	4–9	5–8	7–5	3–4	4-9	5–7	3–4	4–3	4–5	7–6	5–7	6–7	—

=== Opening Day roster ===
- Bobby Bonilla
- Rico Brogna
- Brett Butler
- Carl Everett
- Todd Hundley
- Jeff Kent
- Bret Saberhagen
- David Segui
- José Vizcaíno

=== Transactions ===
- April 11, 1995: Brett Butler signed as a free agent with the New York Mets.
- May 29, 1995: Jarvis Brown was released by the New York Mets.
- June 1, 1995: Aaron Rowand was drafted by the New York Mets in the 40th round of the 1995 amateur draft, but did not sign.
- June 5, 1995: Josías Manzanillo was selected off waivers by the New York Yankees from the New York Mets.
- July 28, 1995: Bobby Bonilla was traded by the New York Mets with a player to be named later to the Baltimore Orioles for Damon Buford and Alex Ochoa. The New York Mets sent Jimmy Williams (minors) (August 16, 1995) to the Baltimore Orioles to complete the trade.
- July 31, 1995: Bret Saberhagen was traded by the New York Mets with a player to be named later to the Colorado Rockies for Juan Acevedo and Arnold Gooch (minors). The New York Mets sent David Swanson (minors) (August 4, 1995) to the Colorado Rockies to complete the trade.
- August 18, 1995: Brett Butler was traded by the New York Mets to the Los Angeles Dodgers for Dwight Maness (minors) and Scott Hunter (minors).

== Roster ==
1995 New York Mets
Roster
Pitchers: 36 Mike Birkbeck; 43 Paul Byrd; 47 Reid Cornelius; 45 Jerry DiPoto; 36 Don Florence; 31 John Franco; 40 Eric Gunderson; 27 Pete Harnisch; 35 Doug Henry; 29,44 Jason Isringhausen; 47 Jason Jacome; 28 Bobby Jones; 44 Kevin Lomon; 39 Josías Manzanillo; 34 Blas Minor; 38 Dave Mlicki; 29 Robert Person; 21 Bill Pulsipher; 43 Mike Remlinger; 17 Bret Saberhagen; 40 Dave Telgheder; 49 Pete Walker	Catchers: 30 Alberto Castillo; 9 Todd Hundley; 33 Kelly Stinnett; Infielders: 13 Edgardo Alfonzo; 23 Tim Bogar; 25 Bobby Bonilla; 26 Rico Brogna; 42 Butch Huskey; 12 Jeff Kent; 11 Aaron Ledesma; 19 Bill Spiers; 15 José Vizcaíno	Outfielders: 18 Jeff Barry; 2 Damon Buford; 22 Brett Butler; 3 Carl Everett; 5 Chris Jones; 22 Alex Ochoa; 6 Joe Orsulak; 1 Ricky Otero; 21 David Segui; 20 Ryan Thompson; Other batters: 5 Brook Fordyce	Manager: 46 Dallas Green; Coaches: 4 Mike Cubbage (third base); 55 Frank Howard (first base); 10 Tom McCraw (hitting); 52 Greg Pavlick (pitching); 7 Bobby Wine (bench); 8 Steve Swisher (bullpen)

== Player stats ==
=== Batting ===
Note: Pos = Position; G = Games played; AB = At bats; H = Hits; Avg. = Batting average; HR = Home runs; RBI = Runs batted in

Pos	Player	G	AB	H	Avg.	HR	RBI
C	Todd Hundley	90	275	77	.280	15	51
1B	Rico Brogna	134	495	143	.289	22	76
2B	Jeff Kent	125	472	131	.278	20	65
SS	José Vizcaíno	135	509	146	.287	3	56
3B	Edgardo Alfonzo	101	335	93	.278	4	41
LF	Joe Orsulak	108	290	82	.283	1	37
CF	Brett Butler	90	367	114	.311	1	25
RF	Carl Everett	79	289	75	.260	12	54

==== Other batters ====
Note: G = Games played; AB = At bats; H = Hits; Avg. = Batting average; HR = Home runs; RBI = Runs batted in

Player	G	AB	H	Avg.	HR	RBI
Bobby Bonilla	80	317	103	.325	18	53
Ryan Thompson	75	267	67	.251	7	31
Kelly Stinnett	77	196	43	.219	4	18
Chris Jones	79	182	51	.280	8	31
Tim Bogar	78	145	42	.290	1	21
Damon Buford	44	136	32	.235	4	12
Butch Huskey	28	90	17	.189	3	11
David Segui	33	73	24	.329	2	11
Bill Spiers	63	72	15	.208	0	11
Ricky Otero	35	51	7	.137	0	1
Alex Ochoa	11	37	11	.297	0	0
Aaron Ledesma	21	33	8	.242	0	3
Alberto Castillo	13	29	3	.103	0	0
Jeff Barry	15	15	2	.133	0	0
Brook Fordyce	4	2	1	.500	0	0

=== Pitching ===
==== Starting pitchers ====
Note: G = Games pitched; IP = Innings pitched; W = Wins; L = Losses; ERA = Earned run average; SO = Strikeouts

Player	G	IP	W	L	ERA	SO
Bobby Jones	30	195.2	10	10	4.19	127
Dave Mlicki	29	160.2	9	7	4.26	123
Bill Pulsipher	17	126.2	5	7	3.98	81
Pete Harnisch	18	110.0	2	8	3.68	82
Bret Saberhagen	16	110.0	5	5	3.35	71
Jason Isringhausen	14	93.0	9	2	2.81	55
Reid Cornelius	10	57.2	3	7	5.15	35
Mike Birkbeck	4	27.2	0	1	1.63	14
Jason Jacome	5	21.0	0	4	10.29	11

==== Other pitchers ====
Note: G = Games pitched; IP = Innings pitched; W = Wins; L = Losses; ERA = Earned run average; SO = Strikeouts

Player	G	IP	W	L	ERA	SO
Dave Telgheder	7	25.2	1	2	5.61	16
Robert Person	3	12.0	1	0	0.75	10

===== Relief pitchers =====
Note: G = Games pitched; W = Wins; L = Losses; SV = Saves; ERA = Earned run average, SO = Strikeouts

Player	G	W	L	SV	ERA	SO
John Franco	48	5	3	29	2.44	41
Jerry Dipoto	58	4	6	2	3.78	49
Doug Henry	51	3	6	4	2.96	62
Blas Minor	35	4	2	1	3.66	43
Eric Gunderson	30	1	1	0	3.70	19
Paul Byrd	17	2	0	0	2.05	26
Don Florence	14	3	0	0	1.50	5
Pete Walker	13	1	0	0	4.58	5
Josías Manzanillo	12	1	2	0	7.88	14
Kevin Lomon	6	0	1	0	6.75	6
Mike Remlinger	5	0	1	0	6.35	6

== Awards and honors ==
All-Star Game

- Bobby Bonilla, Third Base, Reserve

== Farm system ==
Level	Team	League	Manager
AAA	Norfolk Tides	International League	Toby Harrah
AA	Binghamton Mets	Eastern League	John Tamargo
A	St. Lucie Mets	Florida State League	Rafael Landestoy
A	Capital City Bombers	South Atlantic League	Howie Freiling
A-Short Season	Pittsfield Mets	New York–Penn League	Ron Gideon
Rookie	Kingsport Mets	Appalachian League	John Gibbons
Rookie	GCL Mets	Gulf Coast League	John Stephenson

LEAGUE CHAMPIONS: Kingsport
