= Óscar Robles =

Mexican baseball player (born 1976)

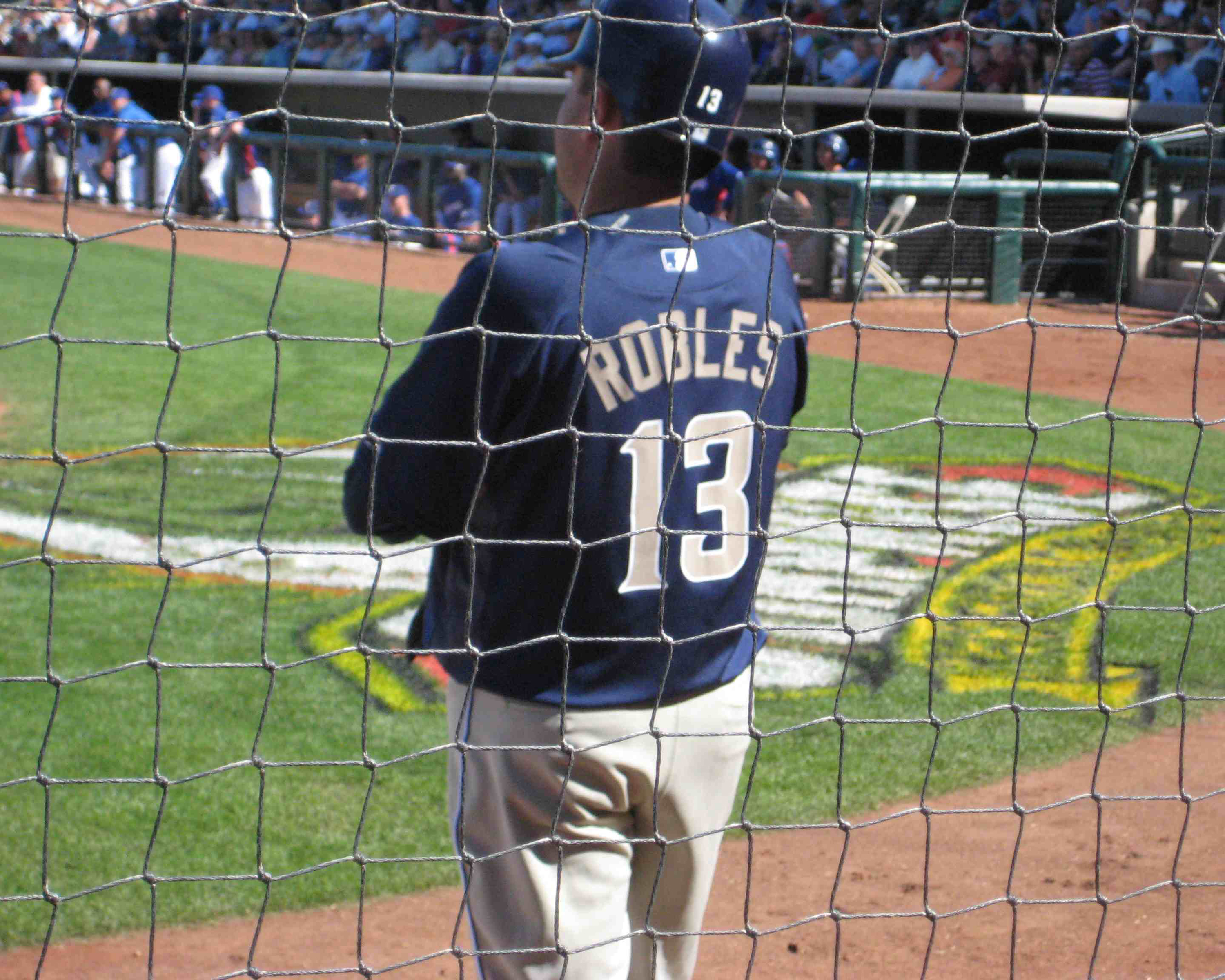
- Robles with the San Diego Padres during spring training in 2008

Caliente de Durango – No. 30
- Infielder / Manager
- Born: April 9, 1976 (age 50); Tijuana, Mexico
- Batted: Left Threw: Right

MLB debut
- May 10, 2005, for the Los Angeles Dodgers

Last MLB appearance
- October 1, 2007, for the San Diego Padres

MLB statistics
- Batting average: .286
- Hits: 110
- Home runs: 5
- Runs batted in: 36
- Stats at Baseball Reference

Teams
- Los Angeles Dodgers (2005–2006); San Diego Padres (2007)

Member of the Mexican Professional

Baseball Hall of Fame
- Induction: 2025

Oscar Manuel Robles Arenas (born April 9, 1976) is a Mexican former professional baseball infielder who currently serves as the manager of Caliente de Durango of the Mexican League. He played in Major League Baseball (MLB) for the Los Angeles Dodgers and San Diego Padres.

== Professional career ==
Robles spent much of the 2000s as a third baseman for the Diablos Rojos del México, and played briefly as an infielder for the Los Angeles Dodgers from May 2005 through 2006. He graduated from Montgomery High School in San Diego, where he had his jersey retired as a pitcher, and set a then-record for San Diego Section career hits (143). As a senior in 1994, he was named the CIF San Diego Section co-Player of the Year after batting .560 and recording a 1.09 ERA.

Robles was originally signed by Houston Astros scout Deron Rombach after being drafted in the third round of the June 1994 free agent draft. After being signed, he used some of his bonus money to buy a scoreboard for his high school field. However, the Astros had no use for Robles, so they sent him back to the Mexican Baseball League (LMB), where he batted around .400, until he was called up by the Los Angeles Dodgers, where he played 110 games in the 2005 season. On February 2, 2007, Robles was released by the Dodgers and his contract was sold to the Diablos Rojos del México. He was soon picked up by the San Diego Padres and invited to spring training.

On April 29, 2008, the Phillies claimed Robles off waivers and assigned him to their Triple-A Lehigh Valley IronPigs in Allentown, Pennsylvania.

Robles played from 2009–2013 with the Diablos Rojos del México, in 2014 with the Guerreros de Oaxaca, and with the Toros de Tijuana from 2015-2017. Following the 2017 season and after winning the Mexican League championship with the Toros, he announced his retirement as a player.

Robles also spent 21 seasons in Mexico's winter league, the Mexican Pacific League (LMP), from 1995 to 2016, where he played for the Algodoneros de Guasave, Mayos de Navojoa, Águilas de Mexicali, and Tomateros de Culiacán. He won the LMP Rookie of the Year Award in his debut season, 1995–96.

== Managing career ==
After retiring, Robles accepted an offer to stay with the Toros de Tijuana as a hitting coach for the 2018 season. On August 6, 2018, Robles was promoted to manager for the rest of the season after the departure of Lino Rivera.

In June 2021, Robles was announced as manager for the Tigres de Quintana Roo of the Mexican League. He led the team to a 32–33 record, and they qualified for the Wild Card as the sixth seed from the South division. However, they lost to the Diablos Rojos del México in the first round of the postseason. Robles was not brought back for the 2022 season.

On December 9, 2021, Robles was announced as new manager for the Algodoneros de Unión Laguna of the Mexican League. He was fired on May 26, 2022, after starting the season with a 9–20 record.

On June 1, 2022, Robles was hired as the new manager for the Guerreros de Oaxaca of the Mexican League. He was not retained following the season.

On December 20, 2022, Robles was announced as new manager for the Generales de Durango of the Mexican League.

On November 25, 2023, Robles was hired by the Dorados de Chihuahua of the Mexican League as manager ahead of the 2024 season. On 6 June, Robles resigned after five consecutive losses and a 16–28 record; he was replaced by the team's hitting coach Gerónimo Gil.

On December 2, 2024, Robles was hired by the Toros de Tijuana as manager ahead of the 2025 season, his second stint with the club in that role. On October 1, 2025, Roberto Kelly was hired as Tijuana's manager, replacing Robles. He was officially let go by the team on October 10.

On February 19, 2026, Robles was hired as manager for the Caliente de Durango of the Mexican League.

== Legacy ==
In April 2021, Robles was inducted into Tijuana's Sport Hall of Fame and a statue was unveiled in the complex's garden.

On 6 November 2025, Robles was enshrined into the Mexican Professional Baseball Hall of Fame as part of the class of 2025 alongside pitchers Francisco Campos, Jorge de la Rosa, Roberto Ramírez and Ismael Valdez, infielder Roberto Saucedo, and executive Enrique Mazón.
