= Carlton Loewer =

American baseball player (born 1973)

- Pitcher
- Born: September 24, 1973 (age 52); Lafayette, Louisiana, U.S.
- Batted: Right Threw: Right

MLB debut
- June 14, 1998, for the Philadelphia Phillies

Last MLB appearance
- June 7, 2003, for the San Diego Padres

MLB statistics
- Win–loss record: 10–18
- Earned run average: 6.12
- Strikeouts: 118
- Stats at Baseball Reference

Teams
- Philadelphia Phillies (1998–1999); San Diego Padres (2001, 2003)

Carlton Edward Loewer (September 24, 1973) is an American former Major League Baseball (MLB) pitcher who was chiefly a starter over parts of four seasons from 1998-2003. He played for the Philadelphia Phillies and San Diego Padres and now owns a real estate company in Wyoming.

Loewer attended Mississippi State University, and in 1994 he played collegiate summer baseball with the Hyannis Mets of the Cape Cod Baseball League. He was selected by the Phillies in the first round of the 1994 MLB draft. Projected by Baseball America to be the 15th pick, he fell to the Phillies at 23rd overall primarily due to coming off an unimpressive junior season with the Bulldogs in which he had a 4.63 earned run average (ERA) and allowed 110 hits in 103 innings. He was ranked a top ten prospect in the Phillies organization by Baseball America for four straight years, reaching as high as fourth in 1995. While with the Scranton/Wilkes-Barre Red Barons in 1997, he established a franchise record for most strikeouts in a season with 152 which was surpassed by Matt Krook in 2022.

His MLB debut was a complete-game, five-hit 4–2 win over the Chicago Cubs at Veterans Stadium on June 14, 1998. He ended his rookie campaign at 7–8 with a 6.09 ERA. He pitched his first-ever major-league shutout in a 3–0 home victory over the Padres on May 4, 1999. He would not win another game until June 2, 2003 when he was with the Padres in a 4–1 triumph over the Arizona Diamondbacks at Qualcomm Stadium.

After a season in which he started 13 of 20 games and had a 2–6 record with a 5.12 ERA despite missing nearly four months because of a stress fracture in his right humerus, Loewer was traded along with Adam Eaton and Steve Montgomery from the Phillies to the Padres for Andy Ashby on November 10, 1999. The Padres' expectation for Loewer to become the third starter in its rotation was dashed two months after the trade when he suffered a compound fracture of his left tibia and a dislocated ankle as a result of falling out of a hunting blind in a tree near his home at the time in Eunice, Louisiana on January 2, 2000. He missed the entire season when he underwent surgery on July 18, 2000 to repair a partial rotator cuff tear which he sustained while recovering from his hunting accident injuries.

Loewer was activated from the disabled list and optioned to the Portland Beavers on May 31, 2001. Four days after being recalled from Portland on June 6, 2001, he made his first MLB appearance since September 29, 1999 by allowing six runs and six hits in the first 2 1/3 innings of an 8–1 Padres loss to the Seattle Mariners at Safeco Field on June 10. Six days later in a 9–2 defeat to the Mariners at Qualcomm Stadium on June 16, he surrendered six runs, seven hits and both a double in the second inning and a triple in the third to John Olerud who completed his second MLB career cycle later in the game. Loewer was optioned back to the Beavers the following day on June 17. He was outrighted to Portland on October 11, 2001. After spending an entire year away from the sport, he signed a minor-league contract with the Padres on December 9, 2002. His contract was purchased by the Padres on May 16, 2003.
