= Steve Montgomery =

American baseball player (born 1970)

- Pitcher
- Born: December 25, 1970 (age 54); Westminster, California, U.S.
- Batted: Right Threw: Right

MLB debut
- April 3, 1996, for the Oakland Athletics

Last MLB appearance
- July 17, 2000, for the San Diego Padres

MLB statistics
- Win–loss record: 2–8
- Earned run average: 4.98
- Strikeouts: 67
- Stats at Baseball Reference

Teams
- Oakland Athletics (1996–1997); Philadelphia Phillies (1999); San Diego Padres (2000)

Steven Lewis Montgomery (born December 25, 1970) is an American professional baseball former pitcher. He played for the Oakland Athletics from 1996 to 1997, Philadelphia Phillies in 1999, and San Diego Padres in 2000.

A 1999 single in his only at-bat left Montgomery with a rare MLB career batting average of 1.000. He was traded along with Adam Eaton and Carlton Loewer from the Phillies to the Padres for Andy Ashby on November 10, 1999.

== See also ==
- 1991 College Baseball All-America Team
