= Francisco Campos (baseball) =

Mexican baseball player (born 1972)

- Pitcher / Manager
- Born: 12 August 1972 (age 54); Guaymas, Sonora, Mexico
- Batted: Right Threw: Right

CPBL debut
- October 5, 1999, for the Brother Elephants

Last CPBL appearance
- October 22, 1999, for the Brother Elephants

CPBL statistics
- Win–loss record: 0–3
- Earned run average: 3.57
- Strikeouts: 12
- Stats at Baseball Reference

Teams
- Brother Elephants (1999)

Career highlights and awards
- LMB: Rookie of the Year Award (1996); Reached 200 wins on 2 July 2019

Member of the Mexican Professional

Baseball Hall of Fame
- Induction: 2025
Medals
Men's baseball
Representing Mexico
Pan American Games
Bronze medal – third place	2003 Santo Domingo	Team
Bronze medal – third place	2007 Rio de Janeiro	Team
Central American and Caribbean Games
Bronze medal – third place	2006 Cartagena	Team
Silver medal – second place	2010 Mayagüez	Team

Francisco Machado Campos (born 12 August 1972) is a Mexican former professional baseball pitcher. He played in the Chinese Professional Baseball League (CPBL) for the Brother Elephants in 1999. He is a 15-time Mexican League All-Star and played with the Campeche Pirates for more than 20 seasons. He was born in Guaymas, Sonora.

Campos finished his career in the Mexican League with a record of 200–148, a 3.35 ERA and 2,181 strikeouts across 3,038 1/3 innings pitched.

== Playing career ==
Originally drafted by the Acereros de Monclova in January 1990, Campos was signed by the Houston Astros in April 1991 as a catcher. He only hit .147/~.275/.235 in 21 games for the Gulf Coast League Astros.

In September 1991, Campos joined the Águilas de Mexicali, but was cut during the pre-season. However, the Águilas sporting director, Manuel "Manny" Cortés, sent him to the Piratitas de Campeche, a minor league affiliate of the Piratas de Campeche. In his first season with the team in 1991–92, Campos injured his foot sliding into home base. He missed the 1992 season and part of the 1993 season with the injury before he signed with the Piratas de Campeche as a third baseman. In 1993 he batted .148/~.200/.174. After batting .278/.381/.333 in 19 games in 1994, he was converted to pitching.

In 1995, Campos had a 1.93 ERA in 5 outings, then became a regular starter in '96 and styled a 10-3 record and 2.49 ERA, 8th in the Mexican League (LMB). In 1997, the 24-year-old hurler had a 9-10, 2.92 record. He improved to 13-6, 2.88 in 1998 and almost doubled his strikeout total from 70 to 130. He was 10th in the LMB in ERA, tied for fifth in wins and second to Ravelo Manzanillo in strikeouts.

In 1999, Campos had an off-year (6-11, 3.71) and was 11-4, 3.10 in 2000 with 172 K in 189 innings. He was third in the Liga in ERA and second to Manzanillo in strikeouts. His 1.79 ERA in the 2000-01 Mexican Pacific League (LMP) was second to Eleazar Mora and he followed with a 10-7, 3.19 year with Campeche.

The 2001–2002 winter league season was another fine one as Campos went 5-2 with a 1.66 ERA, lowest in the LMP and he led with 89 strikeouts. He went 8-9, 3.45 to start the 2002 LMB season. He signed a minor league deal with the Milwaukee Brewers in February 2002. Reporting to the Indianapolis Indians, he had a 3-0, 2.05 record in 4 appearances, allowing a .180 average and 14 K to 1 BB in 22 IP but did not get called up.

Campos went 3-3 with a 2.25 ERA and a LMP-high 76 strikeouts in 2002–2003. That year, he was 6-4 with a 2.40 ERA for Campeche and only 2-4, 5.72 with Indianapolis. Campos began his best run in the 2003–2004 winter ball season. For the Venados de Mazatlán, Campos was 10-2 with a 2.19 ERA and 68 strikeouts to take the LMP pitching Triple Crown and made the Baseball America winter league All-Star team. He pitched six scoreless innings in the 2004 Caribbean Series. Then, Campos went 12-2 with a 1.47 ERA and 99 strikeouts in 123 IP in the LMB season to take the pitching Triple Crown there as well, the first pitcher to win the Triple Crown in 48 years since Francisco Ramirez. He was named the Mexican League MVP. Campos's ERA was 1.22 lower than runner-up Osvaldo Fernández, he struck out 19 more than Leonardo González and José Silva tied him for the win lead. He led Campeche to the pennant that year. Going to the Chicago White Sox system, he went 2-3 with a 4.26 ERA for the Charlotte Knights.

After a 7-2, 3.29 year in winter ball, Campos was again named to the Baseball America winter league All-Star team. He helped Mazatlán win the 2005 Caribbean Series title by going 2-0, 1.13 with 23 K and 3 BB in 16 IP. He won the deciding game in the Series and was named Series MVP. In the regular season, Campos went 11-4 with a 2.84 ERA and 170 strikeouts in 152 innings. He led the league in strikeouts (73 more than runner-up Alonso Beltrán) and ERA (.41 lower than runner-up Eric Knott). Campos was named the Mexican League Pitcher of the Year for the second consecutive season.

Campos was shaky early in the 2006 season, failing to make the 2006 Mets out of spring training and going 6-5 with a 3.84 ERA for Campeche. In his 14th year there, he was dealt away to the Sultanes de Monterrey, where he went 5-0 with a 3.00 ERA for the LMB's top team, though they fell in the finals. Campos was 9-4 with a 3.08 ERA for Campeche in 2007 and finished 5th in the LMB in ERA. In 2008, Francisco was 11-5 with a 2.41 ERA for Campeche, whiffing 115 and allowing 118 hits in 149 2/3 IP. He tied Felix Villegas for the league lead in strikeouts, tied for 4th in wins and second to Juan Delgadillo in ERA.

Campos has made 15 All-Star Game appearances throughout his time in the Mexican League, and was the starting pitcher in 5 of those games. He was also recently awarded the LMB's "Comeback Player of the Year" in 2016. On July 2, 2019, Campos recorded his 200th victory in a game against the Algodoneros de Unión Laguna and subsequently retired as an active player. Only 14 other LMB pitchers have reached the same milestone.

=== National team career ===
In the 2003 Pan American Games, Campos allowed a sacrifice fly to Paul Janish, scoring Seth Smith in the 14th inning of the semifinals as Mexico lost a tough game to the US and Huston Street. It knocked Mexico out of the gold medal game as they settled for bronze.

He was picked to represent Mexico in the 2006 World Baseball Classic; manager Frank Estrada was criticized for not using him more, but he was the club's least effective pitcher with a 7.20 ERA, though he won his lone decision.

In the 2006 Central American and Caribbean Games, Francisco went 1-1 with an 8.10 ERA but Mexico still won a bronze.

In the 2007 Pan American Games, he got the no-decision in a Mexican win over Venezuela, then allowed just 2 runs to Team USA but got little support from a lineup with three major leaguers and many Triple-A veterans, losing a 2-1 decision. He was 0-1 with a 2.19 ERA for the bronze medal winners.

Campos was 1-0 with a 3.48 ERA in the 2008 Final Olympic Qualification Tournament. In 10 1/3 innings, he struck out 22 and walked no one. He easily led in strikeouts, 6 ahead of Min-han Son and 12 ahead of anyone else. He got most of his strikeouts in one game against South Africa, whiffing 18 in 8 innings, allowing only two hits. Mexico failed to advance to the 2008 Olympics.

In the 2008 Americas Baseball Cup, Campos was 1-1 with a 3.38 ERA and had the most balks (2) while being the worst of Mexico's 4 starters (the others were Walter Silva, Oscar Rivera and Pablo Ortega). Mexico still advanced to the 2009 Baseball World Cup. Campos's loss came by a 2-1 decision to Josué Matos and Puerto Rico.

Campos went 0-1 in the 2009 World Baseball Classic, allowing 8 hits and 7 runs in 4 1/3 IP. He entered a game with Australia with a 7-4 lead and tossed two scoreless innings but gave up three runs in the 5th to tie the game. He then came into the game with Cuba ahead 2-1 in the third, replacing Pablo Ortega. He gave up a leadoff single to Rolando Meriño, who advanced on a ground out by Luis Miguel Navas and came home on a two-out single by Michel Enríquez to tie the score. Mexico scored in the 4th but Cuba rallied in the bottom of the inning on a hit by Yosvani Peraza and homer by Yulieski Gourriel to take the lead for good. Campos took the loss.

== Managerial career ==
Following his retirement, in February 2020, Campos was named manager of the Piratas de Campeche for the 2020 season, which was cancelled due to the COVID-19 pandemic. He achieved his first managerial victory on 25 May 2021, when his Piratas defeated the Tigres de Quintana Roo 6–1. He led the Piratas to a 24–39 record, failing to qualify to the playoffs.

Campos remained with the team for the 2022 season, during which the club finished 29–58 and again failed to reach the postseason. In January 2023, Campos stepped down as manager of the Piratas and joined the Mexican Pacific League’s Tomateros de Culiacán as their General Manager. He was replaced by Oswaldo Morejón.

=== Managerial record ===
==== Mexican League ====
Year	Team	Regular season						Postseason			
Year	Team	Games	Won	Lost	Tied	Pct.	Finish	Won	Lost	Pct.	Notes
2021	Piratas de Campeche	63	24	39	0	.381	–	–	–	–	–
2022	Piratas de Campeche	87	29	58	0	.333	–	–	–	–	–
Total		150	53	97	0	.353		–	–	–	–

== Legacy ==
In February 2025, Campos was selected by a committee of journalists as a pitcher for the Mexican League Centennial All-Time Team on the occasion of the league's hundredth anniversary.

On 6 November 2025, Campos was enshrined into the Mexican Professional Baseball Hall of Fame as part of the class of 2025 alongside pitchers Jorge de la Rosa, Roberto Ramírez and Ismael Valdez, infielders Óscar Robles and Roberto Saucedo, and executive Enrique Mazón.
