= Jorge de la Rosa =

Mexican baseball player (born 1981)

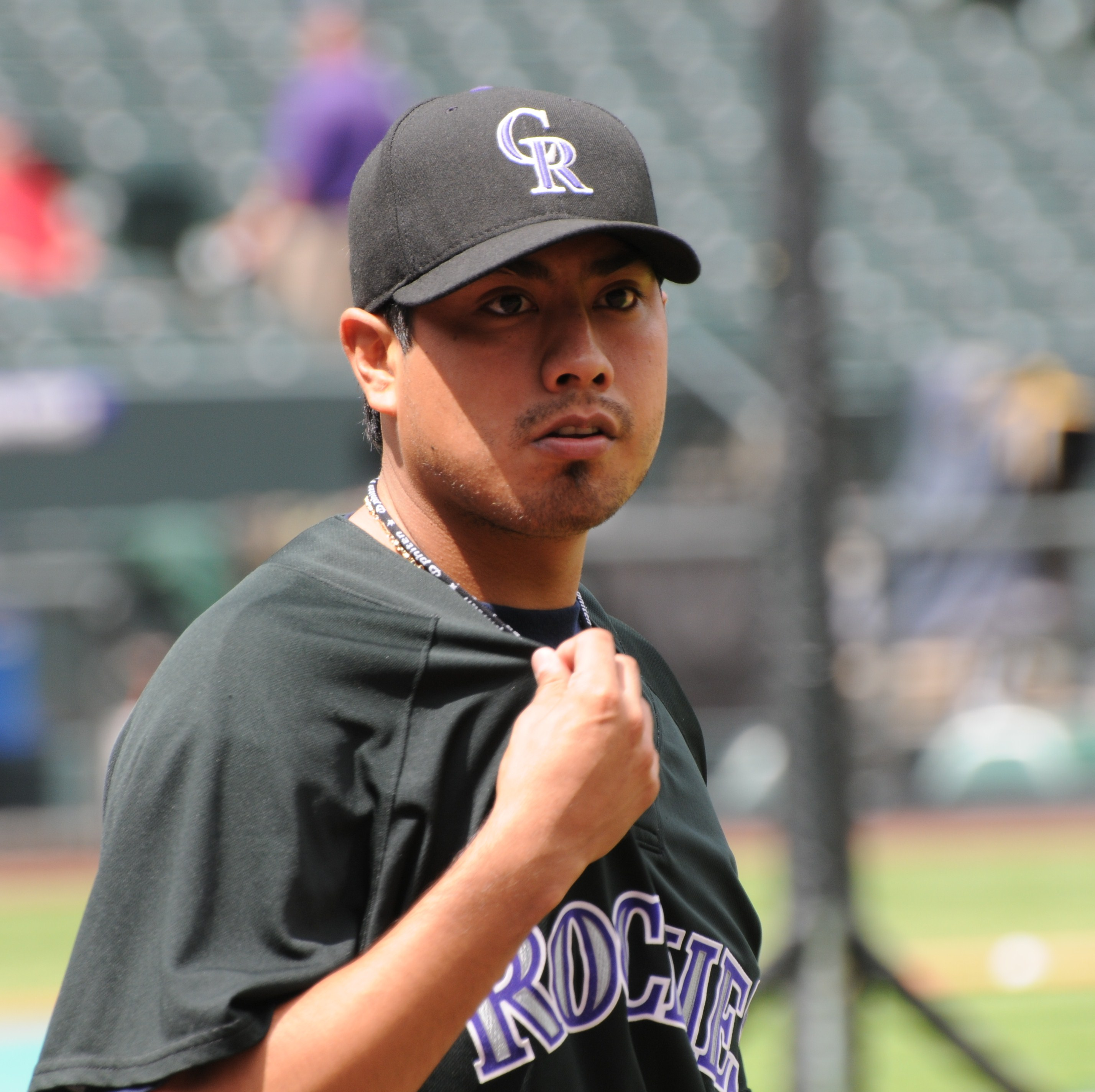
- De la Rosa with the Colorado Rockies
- Pitcher
- Born: April 5, 1981 (age 45); Monterrey, Nuevo León, Mexico
- Batted: Left Threw: Left

MLB debut
- August 14, 2004, for the Milwaukee Brewers

Last MLB appearance
- September 30, 2018, for the Chicago Cubs

MLB statistics
- Win–loss record: 104–87
- Earned run average: 4.58
- Strikeouts: 1,273
- Stats at Baseball Reference

Teams
- Milwaukee Brewers (2004–2006); Kansas City Royals (2006–2007); Colorado Rockies (2008–2016); Arizona Diamondbacks (2017–2018); Chicago Cubs (2018)

Member of the Mexican Professional

Baseball Hall of Fame
- Induction: 2025

Jorge Alberto de la Rosa Gonzalez (born April 5, 1981) is a Mexican former professional baseball pitcher. He played in Major League Baseball (MLB) for the Milwaukee Brewers, Kansas City Royals, Colorado Rockies, Arizona Diamondbacks and Chicago Cubs.

== Professional career ==
=== Minor leagues and Mexican League ===
De la Rosa signed as an amateur free agent with the Arizona Diamondbacks on March 20, 1998. His contract was purchased by the Monterrey Sultanes of the Mexican League on April 2, 2000. In his lone Mexican League season, he was 3–2 with a 6.28 ERA in 37 relief appearances. The Boston Red Sox purchased his contract from Monterrey on February 22, 2001. In 2001 and 2002, he pitched for both the High-A Sarasota Red Sox and Double-A Trenton Thunder. In 2003, he split time between the Double-A Portland Sea Dogs and Triple-A Pawtucket Red Sox. De la Rosa pitched in the All-Star Futures Game in both 2002 and 2003.

De la Rosa was traded twice in one week after the 2003 season as part of package return for an All-Star. He briefly returned to the Diamondbacks, who traded Curt Schilling to the Red Sox on November 28, 2003 for de la Rosa, Casey Fossum, Brandon Lyon, and Mike Goss. The Diamondbacks traded De la Rosa, Chris Capuano, Craig Counsell, Chad Moeller, Lyle Overbay, and Junior Spivey to the Milwaukee Brewers for Richie Sexson, Shane Nance, and a player to be named later on December 1. Noochie Varner went to the Diamondbacks two weeks later to complete the trade.

De la Rosa started the 2004 season with the Triple-A Indianapolis Indians.

=== Milwaukee Brewers ===
De la Rosa made his MLB debut on August 14, 2004, for the Milwaukee Brewers, earning a loss against the Florida Marlins. He returned to Triple-A after the game but rejoined the Brewers in September. He was 0–3 in five starts for the Brewers, with a 6.35 ERA in 22 2/3 innings.

In 2005, De la Rosa split between the minors and the Brewers bullpen, appearing in 38 games, with a record of 2–2.

During the 2006 season, Brewers starting pitchers Ben Sheets, Tomo Ohka, and long relief man Rick Helling were injured, leaving the fifth spot open. The Brewers inserted De la Rosa in the starting rotation after an unsuccessful stint with Dana Eveland. In 3 starts, he went 0–2 with a 12.27 ERA. In his third start, he was removed because of blisters on his finger. He was then placed on the 15-day disabled list. In 18 games, his ERA was 8.60 with 30 runs allowed and 22 walks in 30 innings.

=== Kansas City Royals ===
De la Rosa was traded to the Kansas City Royals for Tony Graffanino on July 25, 2006. In his first start for the Royals, De la Rosa pitched six innings, allowing two earned runs and earning the win. De la Rosa remained in the rotation, finishing the season with a 3–4 record in 10 starts for the Royals.

De la Rosa's 2007 season marked his first full season in the major leagues, pitching in 23 starts for the Royals. He was 8–12 with an ERA of 5.82 in 130 innings for the Royals.

=== Colorado Rockies ===
On April 30, 2008, De la Rosa was traded to the Colorado Rockies, completing an earlier trade that sent pitcher Ramón Ramírez to the Royals. De la Rosa had improved results in his first season with the Rockies, winning 10 games for the first time in his career. He also lowered his ERA to 4.92 while matching in innings total from the previous season at 130.

De la Rosa struggled during the first half of the 2009 season, going 0–6 in his first 10 starts. However, beginning on June 5, De la Rosa won 16 games the rest of the season, the most among all MLB pitchers in that stretch. He helped the Rockies clinch the NL Wild Card with strong performance in the final four months of the season. On October 4, de la Rosa suffered a strained left groin and left the game. He did not pitch in the postseason. De la Rosa had the best season of his career in 2009, going 16–9 with a 4.38 ERA, and 193 strikeouts. His 16 wins ranked third in the NL in 2009.

De la Rosa started the 2010 season going 3–1 with a 3.91 ERA in his first four starts before suffering a torn flexor tendon band in his middle finger, which put him on the disabled list for more than two months. He returned to the Rockies in early July and finished the season going 8–7, with a 4.22 ERA and 113 strikeouts in 121 2/3 innings pitched.

De la Rosa became a free agent after the 2010 season. On December 1, he signed a two-year, $21.5 million contract with an $11 million player option to remain with the Rockies in 2014.

De la Rosa won his first four decisions in April 2011. However, on May 24, de la Rosa suffered a complete tear of the ulnar collateral ligament in his left elbow, requiring Tommy John surgery and ending his season. He had posted a 5–2 record in 10 starts before the injury.

De la Rosa made his return to the Rockies near the end of the 2012 season, making three short starts in September, going 0–2.

After three injury-plagued seasons, De la Rosa's 2013 season marked one of the best seasons of his career despite a lower strikeout rate. He tied his career high with 16 wins and had a career-low 3.49 ERA in 30 starts.

In 2014, De la Rosa took a step back from his previous season. He finished 14–11 with a 4.10 ERA and allowed 21 home runs. After the season, De la Rosa and the Rockies agreed to a two-year, $25 million contract extension.

On June 14, 2015, De la Rosa became the Rockies all-time wins leader, notching win number 73 for the franchise. He also set the franchise record for strikeouts, which was later surpassed by Germán Márquez. He finished 2015 with a 9–7 record and 4.17 ERA in 149 innings.

In 2016, De la Rosa went 8–9 with a 5.51 ERA in 134 innings. He became a free agent following the season.

De la Rosa's .585 winning percentage is a Rockies' franchise record for pitchers with at least 50 starts. He also leads the Rockies with 481 walks and 70 wild pitches and is second in innings pitched, behind Aaron Cook.

=== Arizona Diamondbacks ===
On February 19, 2017, De la Rosa signed a minor league contract with the Arizona Diamondbacks. He was added to the 40-man roster at the end of spring training and began the season as a reliever. De la Rosa pitched the whole season out of the bullpen for the first time since 2005. He went 3–1 with a 4.21 ERA in 65 games. He became a free agent following the season.

On February 16, 2018, de la Rosa signed a new minor league contract with the Diamondbacks. He had his contract selected to the major league roster on March 25. On July 31, he was designated for assignment. He was released on August 4, 2018.

=== Chicago Cubs ===
On August 10, 2018, de la Rosa signed with the Chicago Cubs. In 17 games, he had a 1.29 ERA and 20 strikeouts in 21 innings. He became a free agent after the season.

=== Colorado Rockies (second stint) ===
On April 5, 2019, de la Rosa signed a new minor league contract with the Rockies. He was released on June 7, without appearing in any games due to an oblique injury.

== International career ==
De la Rosa pitched for the Mexico in the 2006 World Baseball Classic. He did not allow a run in three relief appearances.

== Personal life ==
De la Rosa and his wife Martha had twins named Bernabe and Matias born in June 2010.

== Legacy ==
On 6 November 2025, de la Rosa was enshrined into the Mexican Professional Baseball Hall of Fame as part of the class of 2025 alongside pitchers Francisco Campos, Roberto Ramírez and Ismael Valdez, infielders Óscar Robles and Roberto Saucedo, and executive Enrique Mazón.

== See also ==
- List of Colorado Rockies team records
