= Jamie Arnold (baseball, born 1974) =

American baseball player (born 1974)

- Pitcher
- Born: March 24, 1974 (age 52); Dearborn, Michigan, U.S.
- Batted: Right Threw: Right

Professional debut
- MLB: April 20, 1999, for the Los Angeles Dodgers
- CPBL: April 18, 2004, for the Chinatrust Whales

Last appearance
- MLB: October 1, 2000, for the Chicago Cubs
- CPBL: April 23, 2004, for the Chinatrust Whales

MLB statistics
- Win–loss record: 2–7
- Earned run average: 5.73
- Strikeouts: 42

CPBL statistics
- Win–loss record: 0–0
- Earned run average: 5.40
- Strikeouts: 2
- Stats at Baseball Reference

Teams
- Los Angeles Dodgers (1999–2000); Chicago Cubs (2000); Chinatrust Whales (2004)

James Lee Arnold (born March 24, 1974) is an American former professional baseball right-handed pitcher. He played in Major League Baseball (MLB) for the Los Angeles Dodgers and Chicago Cubs, and in the Chinese Professional Baseball League (CPBL) for the Chinatrust Whales.

== Career ==
Drafted by the Atlanta Braves in the first round of the 1992 Major League Baseball draft, Arnold spent seven seasons in the Braves farm system, pitching for the Gulf Coast Braves (1992), Macon Braves (1993), Durham Bulls (1994–1995), Greenville Braves (1995–1998) and Richmond Braves (1998).

Signed as a minor league free agent by the Los Angeles Dodgers after the 1998 season, Arnold made his Major League Baseball (MLB) debut with the Dodgers on April 20, 1999, against the Braves, working 2 scoreless innings. He pitched 36 games for the Dodgers in 1999, including 3 starts.

He failed to make the Dodgers' Opening Day roster in 2000 and spent the first half of the season primarily with the Albuquerque Dukes. On July 26, 2000, the Dodgers traded him (along with Jorge Piedra to the Chicago Cubs for Ismael Valdes. Arnold pitched in 12 games for the Cubs that season, including 4 starts. Arnold's final major league pitch was also the final pitch thrown at Pittsburgh's Three Rivers Stadium.

Released after the season, he pitched in the minors for two more years, first with the Fresno Grizzlies in the San Francisco Giants system and then with the Florida Marlins Triple-A team, the Calgary Cannons. On May 25, 2002, Arnold threw the first no-hitter in Cannons' history against the Iowa Cubs.
