= Anthony Shumaker =

American baseball player (born 1973)

- Pitcher
- Born: May 14, 1973 (age 53); Tucson, Arizona, U.S.
- Batted: Left Threw: Left

MLB debut
- July 23, 1999, for the Philadelphia Phillies

Last MLB appearance
- October 2, 1999, for the Philadelphia Phillies

MLB statistics
- Win–loss record: 0–3
- Earned run average: 5.96
- Strikeouts: 17
- Stats at Baseball Reference

Teams
- Philadelphia Phillies (1999)

Anthony Warren Shumaker (born 14 May 1973) is an American former Major League Baseball pitcher. He was born in Tucson, Arizona.

Shumaker played baseball while attending college at Cardinal Stritch University. He was drafted in the 23rd round of the 1995 Major League Baseball draft by the Philadelphia Phillies. He played at the Major League level with the team in 1999. The following year, he was selected off waivers by the New York Mets and was later traded to the Baltimore Orioles for minor league player Juan Aracena. He would also be a member of the Chicago Cubs organization.
