= Chris Petersen (baseball) =

American baseball player (born 1970)

- Second baseman
- Born: November 6, 1970 (age 55); Boston, Massachusetts, U.S.
- Batted: Right Threw: Right

MLB debut
- May 25, 1999, for the Colorado Rockies

Last MLB appearance
- June 4, 1999, for the Colorado Rockies

MLB statistics
- Batting average: .154
- Home runs: 0
- Runs batted in: 2
- Stats at Baseball Reference

Teams
- Colorado Rockies (1999)

Christopher Ronald Petersen (born November 6, 1970) is an American former middle infielder in Major League Baseball who played 7 games for the Colorado Rockies in 1999.

== Amateur career ==
Petersen attended Southington High School in Southington, Connecticut and then Georgia Southern University, where he appeared in the 1990 College World Series. In 1991, he played collegiate summer baseball in the Cape Cod Baseball League for the Yarmouth-Dennis Red Sox and was named a league all-star.

== Professional career ==
Selected in the 9th round of the 1992 draft (247th overall) by the Chicago Cubs, Petersen spent several years in the minors before making his major league debut on May 25 with the Colorado Rockies in 1999. He played shortstop in his first start in the Major Leagues against the Houston Astros where he went 1 for 4. In the rest of his season he collected one more hit and two RBIs in nine additional at bats. He finished his season with a .154 batting average, 2 RBI and one run in 13 career at bats. He had a .966 career fielding percentage.

After playing with the Colorado Rockies, Petersen played seasons in AAA with the Atlanta Braves, Pittsburgh Pirates, and the Arizona Diamondbacks.

Petersen spent 2003 and 2004 with the independent Nashua Pride of the Atlantic League.
