= Roberto Ramírez (pitcher) =

Mexican baseball player (born 1972)

- Pitcher
- Born: 17 August 1972 (age 53); Martínez de la Torre, Veracruz, Mexico
- Batted: Left Threw: Left

Professional debut
- MLB: June 12, 1998, for the San Diego Padres
- NPB: April 2, 2000, for the Hanshin Tigers

Last appearance
- MLB: October 1, 1999, for the Colorado Rockies
- NPB: August 9, 2000, for the Hanshin Tigers

MLB statistics
- Win–loss record: 2–5
- Earned run average: 7.69
- Strikeouts: 49

NPB statistics
- Win–loss record: 1–3
- Earned run average: 5.55
- Strikeouts: 17
- Stats at Baseball Reference

Teams
- San Diego Padres (1998); Colorado Rockies (1999); Hanshin Tigers (2000)

Career highlights and awards
- Diablos Rojos del México #25 retired

Member of the Mexican Professional

Baseball Hall of Fame
- Induction: 2025
Medals
Men's baseball
Representing Mexico
Pan American Games
Bronze medal – third place	2007 Rio de Janeiro	Team
Central American and Caribbean Games
Bronze medal – third place	2006 Cartagena	Team

Roberto Sanchez Ramírez (born 17 August 1972) is a Mexican former professional baseball pitcher. Known as "Metralleta" (Machine gun in Spanish), he played two seasons in the majors, pitching in 21 games for the San Diego Padres in 1998 and 34 games for the Colorado Rockies in 1999. On August 15, 1999, Ramirez picked up the only save of his career, holding down a 8-2 Rockies victory over the Montreal Expos. He pitched the 8th and 9th innings, striking out two batters and allowing no runs. He saved the win for John Thomson. He joined the Diablos Rojos del México for the 2001 season.

In 2012, Ramírez stated that he would prefer to retire from professional baseball rather than play for a club other than Diablos Rojos del México:

I have been very fortunate to always wear the México jersey. I believe in loyalty for the colors, and personally, if I were ever traded to another team, I would prefer to retire rather than play for another club.

Ramírez retired in April 2014 and last played for the Diablos Rojos del México. On his last game with the Diablos, his number #25 was retired by the team.

On 6 November 2025, Ramírez was enshrined into the Mexican Professional Baseball Hall of Fame as part of the class of 2025 alongside pitchers Francisco Campos, Jorge de la Rosa, Ismael Valdez, infielders Óscar Robles and Roberto Saucedo, and executive Enrique Mazón.
