= Ricky Otero =

Puerto Rican baseball player (born 1972)

- Center fielder
- Born: April 15, 1972 (age 54); Vega Baja, Puerto Rico
- Batted: Switch Threw: left

MLB debut
- April 26, 1995, for the New York Mets

Last MLB appearance
- August 17, 1997, for the Philadelphia Phillies

MLB statistics
- Batting average: .256
- Home runs: 2
- Runs batted in: 36
- Stats at Baseball Reference

Teams
- New York Mets (1995); Philadelphia Phillies (1996–1997)

Ricardo Otero (born April 15, 1972) is a Puerto Rican former Major League Baseball player who played outfield from 1995 to 1997. He played for the Philadelphia Phillies and New York Mets.
