= Juan Sosa (baseball) =

Dominican baseball player (born 1975)

- Center fielder
- Born: August 19, 1975 (age 50); San Francisco de Macorís, Dominican Republic
- Batted: Right Threw: Right

MLB debut
- September 10, 1999, for the Colorado Rockies

Last MLB appearance
- May 25, 2001, for the Arizona Diamondbacks

MLB statistics
- Batting average: .200
- Hits: 2
- Home runs: 0

CPBL statistics
- Batting average: .215
- Home runs: 0
- Runs batted in: 6
- Stats at Baseball Reference

Teams
- Colorado Rockies (1999); Arizona Diamondbacks (2001); Chinatrust Whales (2004)

Career highlights and awards
- World Series champion (2001)

Juan Luis Sosa Encarnación (born August 19, 1975) is a Dominican former Major League Baseball player who played for two seasons. He played as a shortstop in the minor leagues but spent most of his time in the majors as a center fielder. He played for the Colorado Rockies in 1999 and the Arizona Diamondbacks in 2001. While with the Diamondbacks he appeared in two games, recording a strikeout in his only plate appearance. He also had an assist playing third base. However, he received a 2001 World Series championship ring.
