= Don Florence =

American baseball player (born 1967)

- Pitcher
- Born: March 16, 1967 (age 58); Manchester, New Hampshire
- Batted: Right Threw: Left

MLB debut
- August 8, 1995, for the New York Mets

Last MLB appearance
- September 19, 1995, for the New York Mets

MLB statistics
- Win–loss record: 3–0
- Earned run average: 1.50
- Strikeouts: 5
- Stats at Baseball Reference

Teams
- New York Mets (1995)

Donald Emery Florence (born March 16, 1967) is an American former professional baseball pitcher, who pitched only one season in Major League Baseball for the New York Mets in 1995.

== Playing career ==
Florence grew up in Manchester, New Hampshire and played baseball and football at Manchester Memorial High School. He credited his time as a high school quarterback with helping develop his arm strength.

Florence began his college baseball career at Crowder College in Neosho, Missouri where he managed a 2.82 earned run average as a pitcher and a batting average of .344 as a sophomore. He committed to continue his college baseball career at Tennessee in 1987.

Florence was originally signed by the Boston Red Sox as an amateur free agent in October 1987, and compiled a 28-40 record, with a 3.64 earned run average and 379 strikeouts over seven seasons in their farm system.

He signed with the Mets as a minor league free agent following the 1994 season, and after 47 innings pitched for the Norfolk Tides, in which he only allowed five earned runs, Florence received his first call up to the majors at the robust age of 28.

In his second game, he earned his first major league win against the Philadelphia Phillies on his way to a perfect 3-0 record. He made fourteen appearances out of the Mets' bullpen, and compiled an impressive 1.50 ERA, but never pitched another major league game after 1995.

== Personal life ==
Florence married the former Tonia Kennedy, from New Boston, New Hampshire, with whom he had a daughter, Tatum, in 1993.
