= David Lee (baseball) =

American baseball player (born 1973)

- Relief pitcher
- Born: March 12, 1973 (age 53); Pittsburgh, Pennsylvania, U.S.
- Batted: Right Threw: Right

MLB debut
- May 22, 1999, for the Colorado Cockies

Last MLB appearance
- April 23, 2004, for the Cleveland Indians

MLB statistics
- Win–loss record: 5–2
- Earned run average: 4.37
- Strikeouts: 97
- Stats at Baseball Reference

Teams
- Colorado Rockies (1999–2000); San Diego Padres (2001); Cleveland Indians (2003–2004)

David Emmer Lee (born March 12, 1973) is an American former Major League Baseball player. A pitcher, Lee played for the Colorado Rockies (1999-2000), San Diego Padres (2001), and Cleveland Indians (2003-2004).
