= Jeff Barry (baseball) =

American baseball player (born 1969)

- Outfielder
- Born: September 22, 1969 (age 56); Medford, Oregon, U.S.
- Batted: Switch Threw: Right

Professional debut
- MLB: June 9, 1995, for the New York Mets
- NPB: April 1, 2000, for the Chiba Lotte Marines

Last appearance
- MLB: October 3, 1999, for the Colorado Rockies
- NPB: August 10, 2000, for the Chiba Lotte Marines

MLB statistics
- Batting average: .244
- Home runs: 5
- Runs batted in: 28

NPB statistics
- Batting average: .262
- Home runs: 3
- Runs batted in: 15
- Stats at Baseball Reference

Teams
- New York Mets (1995); Colorado Rockies (1998–1999); Chiba Lotte Marines (2000)

Jeffrey Finis Barry (born September 22, 1969) is an American former Major League Baseball outfielder. He is an alumnus of San Diego State University.

Drafted by the Montreal Expos in the 4th round of the 1990 Major League Baseball draft, Barry made his Major League Baseball debut with the New York Mets on June 9, 1995, and appear in his final game on October 3, 1999. In 2000, Barry played in Japan for the Chiba Lotte Marines.
