= Wayne Gomes =

American baseball player (born 1973)

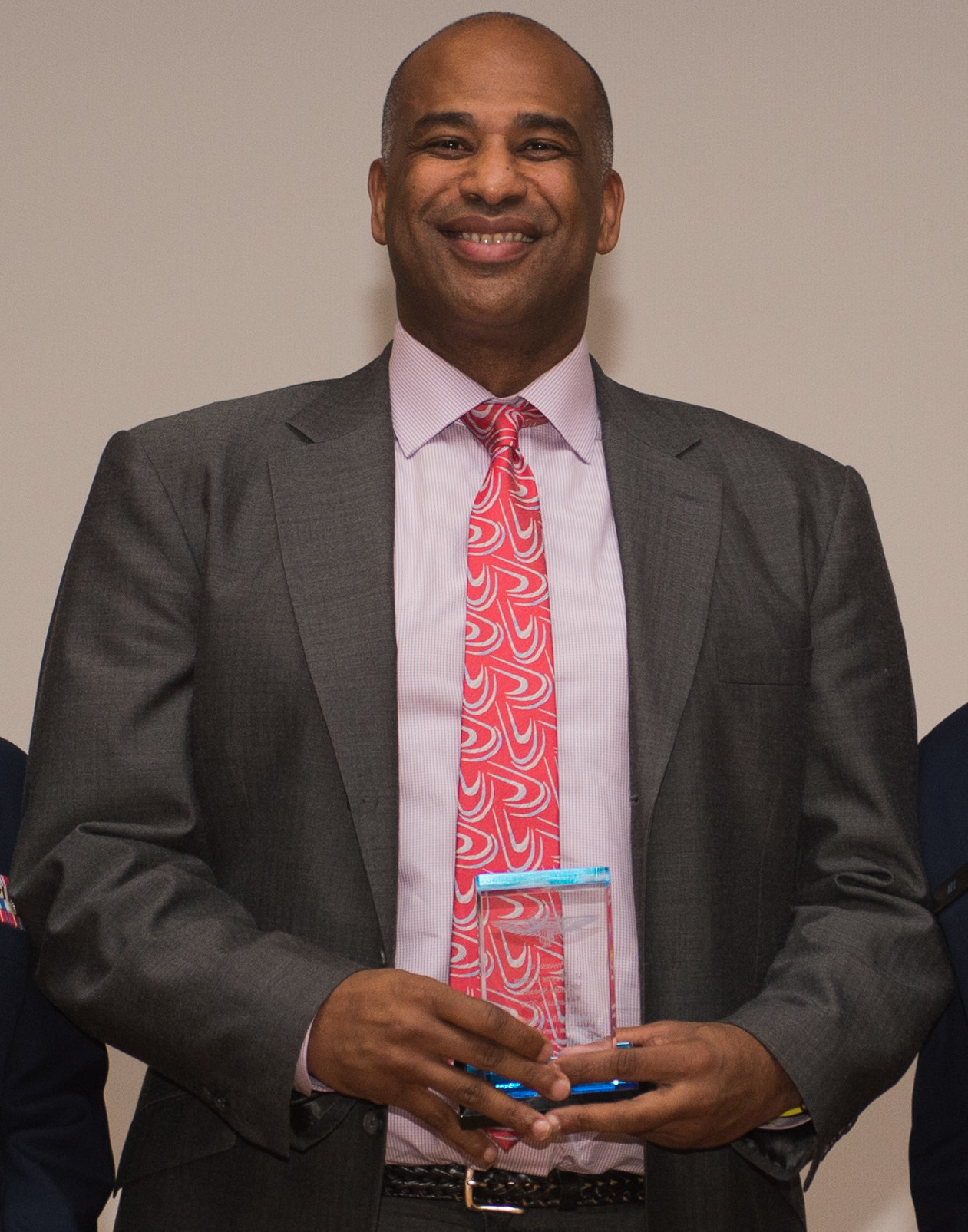
- Gomes at Joint Base Langley–Eustis in 2018
- Pitcher
- Born: January 15, 1973 (age 53); Hampton, Virginia, U.S.
- Batted: Right Threw: Right

MLB debut
- June 13, 1997, for the Philadelphia Phillies

Last MLB appearance
- September 28, 2002, for the Boston Red Sox

MLB statistics
- Win–loss record: 30–23
- Earned run average: 4.60
- Strikeouts: 284
- Stats at Baseball Reference

Teams
- Philadelphia Phillies (1997–2001); San Francisco Giants (2001); Boston Red Sox (2002)

Wayne Maurice Gomes [goms] (born January 15, 1973) is an American former professional baseball relief pitcher. He played in Major League Baseball (MLB) from 1997 through 2002 for the Philadelphia Phillies, San Francisco Giants, and Boston Red Sox. Listed at 6' 2", 215 lb., Gomes batted and threw right handed.

== Career ==
Born and raised in Hampton, Virginia, Gomes graduated from Old Dominion University with a degree in recreation and leisure studies, and is also a member of Phi Beta Sigma fraternity. In 1992, he played collegiate summer baseball with the Orleans Cardinals of the Cape Cod Baseball League and was named a league all-star.

In between, Gomes spent six seasons in the Minor Leagues, and also played winter ball with the Leones del Caracas club of the Venezuelan Professional Baseball League during the 2004 season.

Following his retirement from baseball, Gomes returned to his hometown area of Suffolk and formed the Virginia Baseball Academy. The VBA soon would be located at the Hampton Family YMCA on LaSalle Avenue in Hampton, offering baseball training services, practice venues, and baseball products. In addition, the VBA served as the operator of the Peninsula Pilots AAU baseball and softball organization.

Gomes was named to the Colonial Athletic Association's 25th anniversary baseball team in 2010. He was inducted into the Old Dominion University Sports Hall of Fame in April 2001 and was inducted into the Hampton Roads African American Sports Hall of Fame on November 6, 2010.
