= Dave Veres =

American baseball player (born 1966)

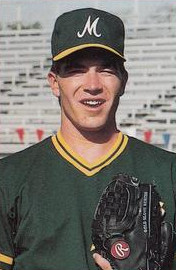
- Veres in 1988
- Pitcher
- Born: October 19, 1966 (age 59); Montgomery, Alabama, U.S.
- Batted: Right Threw: Right

MLB debut
- May 10, 1994, for the Houston Astros

Last MLB appearance
- September 27, 2003, for the Chicago Cubs

MLB statistics
- Win–loss record: 36–35
- Earned run average: 3.44
- Strikeouts: 617
- Saves: 95
- Stats at Baseball Reference

Teams
- Houston Astros (1994–1995); Montreal Expos (1996–1997); Colorado Rockies (1998–1999); St. Louis Cardinals (2000–2002); Chicago Cubs (2003)

David Scott Veres (born October 19, 1966) is an American former professional baseball player who pitched in Major League Baseball from 1994 to 2003.

== Career ==
On January 4, 2007, Veres signed a minor league deal with the Colorado Rockies. However, he was released after appearing in just five games for their Triple-A affiliate in Colorado Springs. In 2008, Veres pitched for the York Revolution of the independent Atlantic League.

Veres played in the 1978 Little League World Series, as a member of the Torrejón Air Base team.
