= Ismael Valdéz =

Mexican baseball player (born 1973)

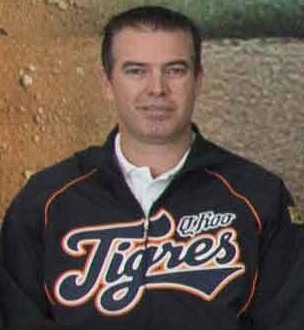
- Valdez with Tigres de Quintana Roo at Los Pinos in 2013
- Pitcher
- Born: August 21, 1973 (age 53); Ciudad Victoria, Tamaulipas, Mexico
- Batted: Right Threw: Right

MLB debut
- June 15, 1994, for the Los Angeles Dodgers

Last MLB appearance
- October 1, 2005, for the Florida Marlins

MLB statistics
- Win–loss record: 104–105
- Earned run average: 4.09
- Strikeouts: 1,173
- Stats at Baseball Reference

Teams
- Los Angeles Dodgers (1994–1999); Chicago Cubs (2000); Los Angeles Dodgers (2000); Anaheim Angels (2001); Texas Rangers (2002); Seattle Mariners (2002); Texas Rangers (2003); San Diego Padres (2004); Florida Marlins (2004–2005)

Member of the Mexican Professional

Baseball Hall of Fame
- Induction: 2025

Ismael Valdéz Alvarez (formerly Valdés; born August 21, 1973) is a Mexican former professional baseball pitcher. He played in Major League Baseball (MLB) for the Los Angeles Dodgers, Chicago Cubs, Anaheim Angels, Texas Rangers, Seattle Mariners, San Diego Padres, and Florida Marlins. During his major league career, he was nicknamed "The Rocket" in his native Mexico.

== Career ==
=== Los Angeles Dodgers ===
Valdéz was 17 years old when he was signed by the Los Angeles Dodgers as an amateur free agent on June 14, 1991. He made his professional debut with the Gulf Coast Dodgers that year when he was 2–2 with a 2.32 ERA in 10 starts.

The Dodgers loaned him to the Mexico City Tigres in the Mexican League for the next two seasons before he returned to the U.S. to play in the Texas League for the San Antonio Missions in 1993. He won 16 games and lost 7 in Mexico, with 115 strikeouts. He won the Championship in 1992, with the Tigers. In 1994 he was promoted to the AAA Albuquerque Dukes in the Pacific Coast League.

Valdéz made his Major League debut on June 15, 1994, at the age of 20. He was the youngest player in the Majors at the time, pitching 2 shutout innings of relief against the Cincinnati Reds. His first win was recorded on July 5 against the Montreal Expos. He started for the first time in the Majors on July 18 against the New York Mets. However, he was taken out in the 2nd inning. In 21 games that season he was 3–1 with a 3.18 ERA.

In 1995, his first full major league season, Valdez had a record of 13–11 with 150 strikeouts and a 3.05 ERA. He was also third in the National League with 6 complete games. In 1996 he finished 3rd in the NL in winning percentage (.682) and held opponents to 2 or fewer runs in 19 of 33 starts. In 1999 he was 9–14 with a 3.98 ERA in 32 starts as the Dodgers did not give him any run support.

On August 27, 2000, Valdéz was pitching for the Dodgers and was ejected from a game after he was accused of retaliating and throwing pitches at the head of Cubs first baseman Mark Grace. The incident began in the top of the fifth inning when Cubs pitcher Kerry Wood yielded the second of two home runs to the Dodgers' Bruce Aven. Wood then threw a pitch close to the next batter, Alex Cora, on the first pitch after Aven's second home run. Wood denied that he was trying to hit Cora, but in the bottom of the fifth, Valdés came close to hitting Grace on the first pitch, drawing a warning from home plate umpire Mark Wegner. Then, four pitches later, Valdéz hit Grace on the shoulder, and was ejected. In September, Frank Robinson, major league baseball's head of on-field discipline, suspended Valdéz for six games and fined him $1,000 for the incident. Valdés initially appealed, but several days later dropped his appeal and began serving his suspension.

In 185 games, 158 of which were starts, with the Dodgers from 1994–2000 he had a 61–57 record and 3.48 ERA with 784 strikeouts. He pitched in the 1995 and 1996 playoffs with the Dodgers.

=== Chicago Cubs ===
On December 12, 1999, the Dodgers traded him to the Chicago Cubs (along with Eric Young) for Terry Adams and two minor leaguers. In 12 starts for the Cubs in 2000 he was 2–4 with a 5.37 ERA. On June 26, 2000, he was traded back to the Dodgers for Jamie Arnold, Jorge Piedra and cash. He made 8 more starts for the Dodgers and was 0–3 with a 6.08 ERA.

=== Anaheim Angels ===
He signed as a free agent with the Anaheim Angels in 2001 and was 9–13 with a 4.45 ERA.

=== Texas Rangers ===
He signed with the Texas Rangers on January 28, 2002.

=== Seattle Mariners ===
The Rangers traded him to the Seattle Mariners on August 19, 2002, for Jermaine Clark and a minor leaguer. Valdez was 2–3 with a 4.93 ERA in 8 starts for the Mariners.

=== Texas Rangers (second stint) ===
The Texas Rangers re-signed Valdéz as a free agent in the offseason. He was 14–17 with a 4.88 in 45 starts for the Rangers between 2002 and 2003.

=== San Diego Padres ===
He then signed as a free agent with the San Diego Padres on December 18, 2003. He was 9–6 with a 5.53 ERA in 23 appearances (20 starts) for the Padres and was traded to the Florida Marlins on July 31, 2004, in exchange for Travis Chick.

=== Florida Marlins ===
In 2 seasons with the Marlins he was 7–5 with a 4.89 ERA in 25 appearances (18 starts). He missed most of the 2005 season with a hairline fracture of his right fibula.

=== Mexico comeback ===
After many years away from the sport, Valdéz returned to organized baseball in 2013 as a member of the Tigres de Quintana Roo in the Mexican League.

== Personal ==
Prior to the 2004 season, Valdez used the spelling Valdés for his surname.

== Legacy ==
On November 6, 2025, Valdez was enshrined into the Mexican Professional Baseball Hall of Fame as part of the class of 2025 alongside pitchers Francisco Campos, Jorge de la Rosa and Roberto Ramírez, infielders Óscar Robles and Roberto Saucedo, and executive Enrique Mazón.

== See also ==
- List of Major League Baseball players named in the Mitchell Report
