= Brian Bohanon =

American baseball player (born 1968)

- Pitcher
- Born: August 1, 1968 (age 57); Denton, Texas, U.S.
- Batted: Left Threw: Left

MLB debut
- April 10, 1990, for the Texas Rangers

Last MLB appearance
- August 17, 2001, for the Colorado Rockies

MLB statistics
- Win–loss record: 54–60
- Earned run average: 5.19
- Strikeouts: 671
- Stats at Baseball Reference

Teams
- Texas Rangers (1990–1994); Detroit Tigers (1995); Toronto Blue Jays (1996); New York Mets (1997–1998); Los Angeles Dodgers (1998); Colorado Rockies (1999–2001)
Medals
Men's baseball
Representing United States
World Junior Baseball Championship
Bronze medal – third place	1986 Windsor	Team

Brian Edward Bohanon (born August 1, 1968) is an American former pitcher in Major League Baseball who played for five teams in a span of seven seasons from 1990 through 2001.

== Career ==
Bohanon played baseball at North Shore High School in Texas. As a senior, he pitched 135.2 innings, won 17 games and had an earned run average of 1.72 en route to the state finals. He pitched three no-hitters in high school and was twice named the Houston Player of the Year. He was selected by the Texas Rangers with the 19th pick of the 1987 MLB draft and received a $137,000 signing bonus.

He was assigned to the Gulf Coast League to begin his career. Prior to the 1990 season, Baseball America ranked him the 45th-best prospect in baseball and the fifth-best in the Rangers' system. Bohanon made his Major League debut with the Rangers on April 10, 1990, pitching a scoreless inning in relief of Charlie Hough at the SkyDome. He recorded his first Major League strikeout on April 25 of that season against Robin Ventura and made his first start five days later in Chicago against the White Sox.

Bohanon spent parts of his first five seasons with the Rangers, often being called up as an injury replacement. His fastball rarely exceeded 85 miles per hour (137 km/h). Bohanon spent 1995 with the Detroit Tigers and 1996 with the Toronto Blue Jays. In 20 appearances for the Blue Jays, he worked exclusively out of the bullpen.

Bohanon's best seasons came in 1997 and 1998 with the New York Mets and Los Angeles Dodgers. Bohanon enjoyed what he called a breakthrough season in 1997 with the Mets before being traded to Los Angeles for Greg McMichael during the 1998 campaign, where he also pitched well.

Before the 1998 season, Bohanon signed with the Colorado Rockies for three years and $9 million despite having what Tom Verducci described in a Sports Illustrated article as "ordinary credentials." Bohanon was a regular with the Rockies for over two seasons and accumulated far more starts and innings pitched with the Rockies than with any other club, compiling a 29–30 record with them. He won 12 games in both 1999 and 2000, and in 2000 was tied for the most wins on the Rockies, with Pedro Astacio, and had an ERA of 4.68 that season.

Following the 2000 season, he underwent surgery on his elbow. In August 2001, he underwent surgery on bone spurs in his pitching elbow. He would go on to appear with the Louisville Bats in 2002 but would not appear in another Major League game.

Bohanon posted a 54–60 record with 671 strikeouts and a 5.19 ERA. In 231 career at-bats, he hit .229 with three home runs.

== Personal life ==
Bohanon and his wife, Tina, had multiple children. Their son Brandon played college baseball at the University of Houston-Victoria for coach Terry Puhl.
