= 1999 New York Mets season =

1999 New York Mets
- National League Wild Card winners
- League: National League
- Division: East
- Ballpark: Shea Stadium
- City: New York City
- Record: 97–66 (.595)
- Divisional place: 2nd
- Owners: Nelson Doubleday Jr., Fred Wilpon
- General manager: Steve Phillips
- Manager: Bobby Valentine
- Television: WPIX-TV/Fox Sports New York (Ralph Kiner, Tom Seaver, Fran Healy, Howie Rose, Gary Thorne)
- Radio: WFAN (Bob Murphy, Gary Cohen, Ed Coleman); WADO (Spanish) (Juan Alicea, Billy Berroa)

The 1999 New York Mets season was the franchise's 38th and the team's 36th season at Shea Stadium. The team finished with a 97–66 record, placing second in the National League East. They secured the NL Wild Card by defeating the Cincinnati Reds in a one-game playoff. The Mets advanced to the NLCS, where they were defeated by the Atlanta Braves in six games.

The Mets were managed by Bobby Valentine, who entered his fourth year as skipper. They played home games at Shea Stadium.

== Offseason ==
- November 11, 1998: Bobby Bonilla was traded by the Los Angeles Dodgers to the New York Mets for Mel Rojas.
- December 1, 1998: Todd Hundley was traded by the New York Mets with Arnold Gooch (minors) to the Los Angeles Dodgers for Roger Cedeño and Charles Johnson.
- December 1, 1998: Charles Johnson was traded by the New York Mets to the Baltimore Orioles for Armando Benítez.
- December 1, 1998: Robin Ventura was signed as a free agent with the New York Mets.
- December 16, 1998: Rickey Henderson signed as a free agent with the New York Mets.
- December 18, 1998: Josías Manzanillo was signed as a free agent with the New York Mets.

== Regular season ==
The Mets' 97 victories were their highest total since they won 100 games in 1988. They were led offensively by catcher Mike Piazza, who compiled a .303 average with 40 home runs and 124 RBI in his first full season with the team. New third baseman Robin Ventura put together a .301 average, 32 home runs, and 120 RBI while second baseman Edgardo Alfonzo hit .304 with 27 home runs and 108 RBI. First baseman John Olerud continued his consistent hitting, hitting .298 with 96 RBI, his third straight year with 90 or more runs driven in. Offseason acquisitions Roger Cedeño and Rickey Henderson recorded the two highest batting averages on the squad at .315 and .313 respectively. Benny Agbayani, a semi-regular outfielder who got more playing time as the year progressed, contributed 14 home runs.

The Mets' pitching staff was again led by Al Leiter with 13 wins. Orel Hershiser matched that total, with Masato Yoshii recording 12 wins and Rick Reed 11. Rookie Octavio Dotel went 8–3 in fourteen starts, and late season acquisition Kenny Rogers won five of six decisions while leading the team in complete games. The rotation was not as strong at keeping runs off the board; the team's four main starters recorded ERAs above 4.00.

The offseason acquisition of Armando Benitez from the Baltimore Orioles ended John Franco's tenure as the team's closer. Franco did manage to record nineteen saves and broke the Major League Baseball record for saves by a left-hander, but Benitez' 1.85 ERA and twenty-two saves ensured the closer role would be his for the foreseeable future.

=== Mercury Mets ===
As part of the now-infamous Turn Ahead the Clock promotion sponsored by Century 21, the Mets changed their name to the "Mercury Mets" while hosting the Pittsburgh Pirates on July 27, 1999.

=== Opening Day starters ===
- SP – Al Leiter
- C – Mike Piazza
- 1B – John Olerud
- 2B – Edgardo Alfonzo
- 3B – Robin Ventura
- SS – Rey Ordóñez
- LF – Rickey Henderson
- CF – Brian McRae
- RF – Bobby Bonilla

=== Season standings ===
NL East
Team	W	L	Pct.	GB	Home	Road
Atlanta Braves	103	59	.636	—	56‍–‍25	47‍–‍34
New York Mets	97	66	.595	6½	49‍–‍32	48‍–‍34
Philadelphia Phillies	77	85	.475	26	41‍–‍40	36‍–‍45
Montreal Expos	68	94	.420	35	35‍–‍46	33‍–‍48
Florida Marlins	64	98	.395	39	35‍–‍45	29‍–‍53

=== Record vs. opponents ===
1999 National League record Source: MLB Standings Grid – 1999
Team	AZ	ATL	CHC	CIN	COL	FLA	HOU	LAD	MIL	MON	NYM	PHI	PIT	SD	SF	STL	AL
Arizona	—	4–5	7–2	1–8	6–7	8–1	5–4	7–6	5–4	6–3	7–2	8–1	5–2	11–2	9–3	4–4	7–8
Atlanta	5–4	—	2–5	8–1	5–4	9–4	6–1	5–4	5–2	9–4	9–3	8–5	6–3	5–4	4–5	8–1	9–9
Chicago	2–7	5–2	—	5–8	4–5	6–3	3–9	2–7	6–6	2–5	3–6	2–7	7–6	6–3	1–7	7–5	6–9
Cincinnati	8–1	1–8	8–5	—	7–2	6–1	9–4	4–3	6–6	4–3	5–5	6–3	7–6	6–3	4–5	8–4	7–8
Colorado	7–6	4–5	5–4	2–7	—	5–4	2–6	8–5	6–3	6–3	4–5	5–4	2–7	4–9	4–9	4–5	4–8
Florida	1–8	4–9	3–6	1–6	4–5	—	2–7	7–2	5–4	8–4	3–10	2–11	3–4	3–6	4–5	3–4	11–7
Houston	4–5	1–6	9–3	4–9	6–2	7–2	—	6–3	8–5	7–2	4–5	6–1	5–7	8–1	5–4	5–7	12–3
Los Angeles	6–7	4–5	7–2	3–4	5–8	2–7	3–6	—	7–2	5–4	4–4	6–3	3–6	3–9	8–5	3–6	8–7
Milwaukee	4–5	2–5	6–6	6–6	3–6	4–5	5–8	2–7	—	5–4	2–5	5–4	8–4	3–5	4–5	7–6	8–6
Montreal	3–6	4–9	5–2	3–4	3–6	4–8	2–7	4–5	4–5	—	5–8	6–6	3–6	5–3	4–5	5–4	8–10
New York	2–7	3–9	6–3	5–5	5–4	10–3	5–4	4–4	5–2	8–5	—	6–6	7–2	7–2	7–2	5–2	12–6
Philadelphia	1–8	5–8	7–2	3–6	4–5	11–2	1–6	3–6	4–5	6–6	6–6	—	3–4	6–3	2–6	4–5	11–7
Pittsburgh	2–5	3–6	6–7	6–7	7–2	4–3	7–5	6–3	4–8	6–3	2–7	4–3	—	3–6	4–5	7–5	7–8
San Diego	2–11	4–5	3–6	3–6	9–4	6–3	1–8	9–3	5–3	3–5	2–7	3–6	6–3	—	5–7	2–7	11–4
San Francisco	3–9	5–4	7–1	5–4	9–4	5–4	4–5	5–8	5–4	5–4	2–7	6–2	5–4	7–5	—	6–3	7–8
St. Louis	4–4	1–8	5–7	4–8	5–4	4–3	7–5	6–3	6–7	4–5	2–5	5–4	5–7	7–2	3–6	—	7–8

=== Notable transactions ===
- July 31, 1999: Brian McRae was traded by the New York Mets with Thomas Johnson (minors) and Rigo Beltrán to the Colorado Rockies for Darryl Hamilton and Chuck McElroy.
- July 31, 1999: Jason Isringhausen was traded by the New York Mets with Greg McMichael to the Oakland Athletics for Billy Taylor.

=== Game log ===
Legend
Mets Win	Mets Loss	Game Postponed	Clinched playoff spot
Bold = Mets team member

1999 Game Log
Overall: 97–66 Home: 49–32; Away: 48–34
April: (14–9) Home: 6–4; Away: 8–5

#	Date	Opponent	Score	Win	Loss	Save	Location	Attendance	Record
1	April 5	@ Marlins	2–6	Fernandez (1–0)	**Leiter** (0–1)	—	Pro Player Stadium	38,983	0–1
2	April 6	@ Marlins	12–3	**Reed** (1–0)	Hernandez (0–1)	**Watson** (1)	Pro Player Stadium	18,075	1–1
3	April 7	@ Marlins	6–0	**Jones** (1–0)	Sanchez (0–1)	—	Pro Player Stadium	13,845	2–1
4	April 8	@ Expos	1–5	Batista (1–0)	**Hershiser** (0–1)	Urbina (1)	Olympic Stadium	43,918	2–2
5	April 9	@ Expos	10–3	**Yoshii** (1–0)	Thurman (0–1)	—	Olympic Stadium	12,386	3–2
6	April 10	@ Expos	4–3 (11)	**Cook** (1–0)	Telford (0–1)	**Franco** (1)	Olympic Stadium	16,173	4–2
7	April 11	@ Expos	6–3	**Watson** (1–0)	Pavano (0–2)	**Franco** (2)	Olympic Stadium	10,366	5–2
8	April 12	Marlins	8–1	**Jones** (2–0)	Hernandez (0–2)	—	**Shea Stadium**	52,052	6–2
9	April 14	Marlins	4–1	**Hershiser** (1–1)	Sanchez (0–2)	**Franco** (3)	**Shea Stadium**	15,729	7–2
10	April 15	Marlins	4–11	Meadows (2–0)	**Yoshii** (1–1)	—	**Shea Stadium**	14,165	7–3
11	April 16	Expos	4–6	Hermanson (2–0)	**Leiter** (0–2)	Urbina (2)	**Shea Stadium**	17,900	7–4
12	April 17	Expos	3–2	**Jones** (3–0)	Pavano (0–3)	**Franco** (4)	**Shea Stadium**	34,784	8–4
13	April 18	Expos	2–4	Vazquez (1–1)	**Watson** (1–1)	Urbina (3)	**Shea Stadium**	26,020	8–5
14	April 20	@ Reds	3–2	**Cook** (2–0)	Harnisch (1–2)	**Franco** (5)	Cinergy Field	14,006	9–5
15	April 21	@ Reds	4–7	Sullivan (1–0)	**Yoshii** (1–2)	Graves (2)	Cinergy Field	15,040	9–6
16	April 22	@ Reds	4–1	**Leiter** (1–2)	Tomko (0–1)	**Franco** (6)	Cinergy Field	14,783	10–6
17	April 23	@ Cubs	6–5	**Cook** (3–0)	Beck (1–2)	**Franco** (7)	Wrigley Field	20,828	11–6
18	April 24	@ Cubs	0–2	Mulholland (1–0)	**Watson** (1–2)	Beck (3)	Wrigley Field	38,516	11–7
19	April 25	@ Cubs	4–8	Myers (1–0)	**Hershiser** (1–2)	—	Wrigley Field	39,265	11–8
20	April 27	Padres	2–6	Ashby (4–1)	**Yoshii** (1–3)	—	**Shea Stadium**	25,113	11–9
21	April 28	Padres	4–3	**Wendell** (1–0)	Hoffman (0–2)	—	**Shea Stadium**	22,581	12–9
22	April 29	Padres	8–5	**Cook** (4–0)	Boehringer (0–1)	**Franco** (8)	**Shea Stadium**	18,442	13–9
23	April 30	Giants	7–2	**Watson** (2–2)	Estes (2–2)	**Wendell** (1)	**Shea Stadium**	32,427	14–9

May: (13–15) Home: 7–9; Away: 6–6

#	Date	Opponent	Score	Win	Loss	Save	Location	Attendance	Record
24	May 1	Giants	9–4	**Hershiser** (2–2)	Brock (2–2)	—	**Shea Stadium**	33,825	15–9
25	May 2	Giants	2–0	**Cook** (5–0)	Johnstone (3–1)	**Franco** (9)	**Shea Stadium**	37,431	16–9
26	May 3	Astros	5–3	**Reed** (2–0)	Holt (0–4)	**Franco** (10)	**Shea Stadium**	14,878	17–9
27	May 4	Astros	1–6	Hampton (3–1)	**Leiter** (1–3)	—	**Shea Stadium**	27,192	17–10
28	May 5	Astros	4–5	Powell (2–0)	**Benitez** (0–1)	Wagner (10)	**Shea Stadium**	25,026	17–11
29	May 7	@ Diamondbacks	7–14	Stottlemyre (4–1)	**Hershiser** (2–3)	—	Bank One Ballpark	38,154	17–12
30	May 8	@ Diamondbacks	4–2	**Yoshii** (2–3)	Benes (2–3)	**Benitez** (1)	Bank One Ballpark	37,593	18–12
31	May 9	@ Diamondbacks	6–11	Daal (3–3)	**Reed** (2–1)	—	Bank One Ballpark	38,250	18–13
32	May 10	@ Rockies	3–10	Astacio (3–3)	**Leiter** (1–4)	—	Coors Field	40,021	18–14
33	May 11	@ Rockies	5–8	B. M. Jones (1–1)	**B. J. Jones** (3–1)	—	Coors Field	40,032	18–15
34	May 12	@ Rockies	10–5	**Reed** (3–1)	Thomson (0–5)	—	Coors Field	41,011	19–15
35	May 14	@ Phillies	7–3	**Yoshii** (3–3)	Ogea (2–3)	—	Veterans Stadium	21,074	20–15
36	May 15	@ Phillies	9–7	**Mahomes** (1–0)	Ryan (1–2)	**Franco** (11)	Veterans Stadium	27,039	21–15
37	May 16	@ Phillies	2–5	Byrd (5–2)	**Hershiser** (2–4)	Brantley (5)	Veterans Stadium	28,422	21–16
38	May 17	Brewers	6–7	Karl (5–1)	**B. J. Jones** (3–2)	Wickman (8)	**Shea Stadium**	16,326	21–17
39	May 18	Brewers	2–4	Weathers (3–0)	**Cook** (5–1)	Wickman (9)	**Shea Stadium**	26,411	21–18
–	May 19	Brewers	Postponed (rain); rescheduled for May 20						
40	May 20 (1)	Brewers	11–10	**Leiter** (2–4)	Abbott (0–5)	**Franco** (12)	**Shea Stadium**	N/A	22–18
41	May 20 (2)	Brewers	7–5	**Yoshii** (4–3)	Woodard (3–4)	—	**Shea Stadium**	19,542	23–18
42	May 21	Phillies	7–5	**Hershiser** (3–4)	Loewer (2–4)	**Franco** (13)	**Shea Stadium**	24,554	24–18
43	May 22	Phillies	3–9	Byrd (6–2)	**B. J. Jones** (3–3)	—	**Shea Stadium**	34,575	24–19
44	May 23	Phillies	5–4	**Beltran** (1–0)	Schilling (7–2)	—	**Shea Stadium**	34,950	25–19
45	May 24	@ Pirates	4–7	Silva (2–2)	**Isringhausen** (0–1)	Williams (8)	Three Rivers Stadium	11,880	25–20
46	May 25	@ Pirates	8–3	**Yoshii** (5–3)	Benson (3–3)	—	Three Rivers Stadium	12,029	26–20
47	May 26	@ Pirates	5–2	**Hershiser** (4–4)	Schourek (2–5)	**Franco** (14)	Three Rivers Stadium	13,681	27–20
48	May 28	Diamondbacks	1–2	Daal (5–4)	**Reed** (3–2)	Olson (6)	**Shea Stadium**	32,114	27–21
49	May 29	Diamondbacks	7–8	Reynoso (3–1)	**Beltran** (1–1)	Kim (1)	**Shea Stadium**	35,167	27–22
50	May 30	Diamondbacks	1–10	Johnson (6–2)	**Yoshii** (5–4)	—	**Shea Stadium**	38,302	27–23
51	May 31	Reds	3–5	Villone (1–0)	**Leiter** (2–5)	Williamson (6)	**Shea Stadium**	28,368	27–24

June: (17–10) Home: 8–3; Away: 9–7

#	Date	Opponent	Score	Win	Loss	Save	Location	Attendance	Record
52	June 1	Reds	0–4	Harnisch (5–5)	**Hershiser** (4–5)	—	**Shea Stadium**	17,899	27–25
53	June 2	Reds	7–8	Williamson (4–1)	**Franco** (0–1)	Sullivan (1)	**Shea Stadium**	15,837	27–26
54	June 4	@ Yankees	3–4	Grimsley (5–0)	**Reed** (3–3)	Rivera (14)	Yankee Stadium	56,175	27–27
55	June 5	@ Yankees	3–6	Hernandez (6–5)	**Yoshii** (5–5)	Rivera (15)	Yankee Stadium	55,935	27–28
56	June 6	@ Yankees	7–2	**Leiter** (3–5)	Clemens (5–1)	—	Yankee Stadium	56,294	28–28
57	June 7	Blue Jays	8–2	**Hershiser** (5–5)	Halladay (4–3)	—	**Shea Stadium**	21,457	29–28
58	June 8	Blue Jays	11–3	**Isringhausen** (1–1)	Hentgen (4–5)	—	**Shea Stadium**	18,984	30–28
59	June 9	Blue Jays	4–3 (14)	**Mahomes** (2–0)	Davey (1–1)	—	**Shea Stadium**	18,254	31–28
60	June 11	Red Sox	2–3 (12)	Corsi (1–2)	**Franco** (0–2)	Wasdin (1)	**Shea Stadium**	36,700	31–29
61	June 12	Red Sox	4–2	**Leiter** (4–5)	Rapp (2–4)	**Franco** (15)	**Shea Stadium**	43,819	32–29
62	June 13	Red Sox	5–4	**Hershiser** (6–5)	Portugal (3–5)	**Wendell** (2)	**Shea Stadium**	46,473	33–29
63	June 14	@ Reds	4–8	Williamson (6–2)	**McMichael** (0–1)	—	Cinergy Field	19,270	33–30
64	June 15	@ Reds	11–3	**Reed** (4–3)	Tomko (2–4)	—	Cinergy Field	18,248	34–30
65	June 16	@ Reds	5–2	**Yoshii** (6–5)	Parris (4–1)	**Franco** (16)	Cinergy Field	25,531	35–30
66	June 17	@ Cardinals	4–3	**Leiter** (5–5)	Mercker (2–3)	**Cook** (1)	Busch Stadium	37,601	36–30
67	June 18	@ Cardinals	6–2	**Hershiser** (7–5)	Acevedo (4–2)	**Benitez** (2)	Busch Stadium	47,191	37–30
68	June 19	@ Cardinals	6–7	Aybar (3–1)	**Isringhausen** (1–2)	Bottalico (9)	Busch Stadium	47,638	37–31
69	June 20	@ Cardinals	9–6	**Reed** (5–3)	Croushore (1–1)	**Franco** (17)	Busch Stadium	44,705	38–31
70	June 22	Marlins	8–2	**McMichael** (1–1)	Springer (2–9)	**Benitez** (3)	**Shea Stadium**	30,713	39–31
71	June 23	Marlins	6–3	**Leiter** (6–5)	Meadows (5–8)	**Franco** (18)	**Shea Stadium**	25,116	40–31
72	June 24	Marlins	3–2	**Cook** (6–1)	Hernandez (3–7)	**Franco** (19)	**Shea Stadium**	29,567	41–31
73	June 25	@ Braves	10–2	**Reed** (6–3)	Perez (4–5)	—	Turner Field	48,292	42–31
74	June 26	@ Braves	2–7	Glavine (6–7)	**Dotel** (0–1)	—	Turner Field	48,293	42–32
75	June 27	@ Braves	0–1	Maddux (7–5)	**Yoshii** (6–6)	Rocker (16)	Turner Field	46,092	42–33
76	June 28	@ Marlins	10–4	**Leiter** (7–5)	Meadows (5–9)	—	Pro Player Stadium	12,444	43–33
77	June 29	@ Marlins	5–1	**Hershiser** (8–5)	Hernandez (3–8)	—	Pro Player Stadium	11,256	44–33
78	June 30	@ Marlins	3–4 (10)	Alfonseca (4–4)	**Benitez** (0–2)	—	Pro Player Stadium	16,660	44–34

July: (18–9) Home: 10–6; Away: 8–3

#	Date	Opponent	Score	Win	Loss	Save	Location	Attendance	Record
79	July 1	@ Marlins	12–8	**Dotel** (1–1)	Dempster (4–4)	—	Pro Player Stadium	10,884	45–34
80	July 2	Braves	0–16	Maddux (8–5)	**Yoshii** (6–7)	—	**Shea Stadium**	51,979	45–35
81	July 3	Braves	0–3	Millwood (10–4)	**Leiter** (7–6)	Rocker (17)	**Shea Stadium**	43,256	45–36
82	July 4	Braves	7–6	**Cook** (7–1)	Smoltz (8–3)	**Benitez** (4)	**Shea Stadium**	32,699	46–36
83	July 5	Expos	2–1	**Wendell** (2–0)	Mota (1–3)	**Benitez** (5)	**Shea Stadium**	22,699	47–36
84	July 6	Expos	10–0	**Hershiser** (9–5)	Pavano (6–7)	**Isringhausen** (1)	**Shea Stadium**	30,053	48–36
85	July 7	Expos	1–3	Kline (3–2)	**Wendell** (2–1)	Urbina (18)	**Shea Stadium**	26,457	48–37
86	July 8	Expos	3–4	Ayala (1–5)	**Cook** (7–2)	Urbina (19)	**Shea Stadium**	29,730	48–38
87	July 9	Yankees	5–2	**Leiter** (8–6)	Clemens (8–3)	**Benitez** (6)	**Shea Stadium**	53,820	49–38
88	July 10	Yankees	9–8	**Mahomes** (3–0)	Rivera (2–2)	—	**Shea Stadium**	53,792	50–38
89	July 11	Yankees	3–6	Irabu (6–3)	**Hershiser** (9–6)	Rivera (23)	**Shea Stadium**	53,869	50–39
**70th All-Star Game in Boston, Massachusetts**
90	July 15	@ Devil Rays	8–7 (10)	**Benitez** (1–2)	Charlton (0–2)	—	Tropicana Field	19,384	51–39
91	July 16	@ Devil Rays	9–7	**Reed** (7–3)	Eiland (1–5)	**Cook** (2)	Tropicana Field	20,929	52–39
92	July 17	@ Devil Rays	2–3	Alvarez (5–6)	**Hershiser** (9–7)	Hernandez (27)	Tropicana Field	36,994	52–40
93	July 18	@ Orioles	8–6	**Yoshii** (7–7)	Guzman (4–8)	**Benitez** (7)	Oriole Park at Camden Yards	47,480	53–40
94	July 19	@ Orioles	4–1	**Dotel** (2–1)	Johnson (1–4)	**Benitez** (8)	Oriole Park at Camden Yards	42,615	54–40
95	July 20	@ Orioles	1–4	Ponson (9–6)	**Leiter** (8–7)	—	Oriole Park at Camden Yards	45,450	54–41
96	July 21	@ Expos	7–3	**Reed** (8–3)	Smith (1–5)	—	Olympic Stadium	8,676	55–41
97	July 22	@ Expos	7–4	**Hershiser** (10–7)	Hermanson (3–9)	—	Olympic Stadium	8,044	56–41
98	July 23	Cubs	5–4	**Cook** (8–2)	Tapani (6–7)	**Benitez** (9)	**Shea Stadium**	52,135	57–41
99	July 24	Cubs	2–1	**Dotel** (3–1)	Trachsel (3–14)	**Benitez** (10)	**Shea Stadium**	47,995	58–41
100	July 25	Cubs	5–1	**Leiter** (9–7)	Serafini (2–2)	—	**Shea Stadium**	47,679	59–41
101	July 26	Pirates	7–5	**Reed** (9–3)	Cordova (5–5)	**Wendell** (3)	**Shea Stadium**	32,010	60–41
102	July 27	Pirates	1–5	Benson (8–8)	**Hershiser** (10–8)	—	**Shea Stadium**	36,337	60–42
103	July 28	Pirates	9–2	**Cook** (9–2)	Wilkins (2–1)	—	**Shea Stadium**	42,920	61–42
104	July 30	@ Cubs	10–9	**Mahomes** (4–0)	Farnsworth (2–4)	**Benitez** (11)	Wrigley Field	38,594	62–42
105	July 31	@ Cubs	10–17	Serafini (3–2)	**Isringhausen** (1–3)	—	Wrigley Field	39,431	62–43

August: (18–10) Home: 8–5; Away: 10–5

#	Date	Opponent	Score	Win	Loss	Save	Location	Attendance	Record
106	August 1	@ Cubs	5–4 (13)	**Mahomes** (5–0)	Sanders (4–5)	—	Wrigley Field	39,222	63–43
107	August 2	@ Brewers	7–2	**Reed** (10–3)	Nomo (9–4)	—	County Stadium	19,626	64–43
108	August 3	@ Brewers	10–3	**Hershiser** (11–8)	Pulsipher (3–2)	—	County Stadium	17,669	65–43
109	August 4	@ Brewers	9–5	**Rogers** (6–3)	Peterson (1–2)	—	County Stadium	20,762	66–43
110	August 6	Dodgers	2–1	**Dotel** (4–1)	Park (6–9)	**Benitez** (12)	**Shea Stadium**	43,825	67–43
111	August 7	Dodgers	6–7	Borbon (3–1)	**Taylor** (1–6)	Shaw (23)	**Shea Stadium**	53,656	67–44
112	August 8	Dodgers	3–14	Dreifort (9–11)	**Reed** (10–4)	—	**Shea Stadium**	39,803	67–45
113	August 9	Dodgers	2–9	Brown (13–6)	**Hershiser** (11–9)	—	**Shea Stadium**	36,345	67–46
114	August 10	Padres	4–3	**Wendell** (3–1)	Ashby (10–6)	**Benitez** (13)	**Shea Stadium**	32,101	68–46
115	August 11	Padres	12–5	**Mahomes** (6–0)	Hitchcock (11–9)	—	**Shea Stadium**	34,232	69–46
116	August 12	Padres	9–3	**Leiter** (10–7)	Williams (5–11)	—	**Shea Stadium**	32,062	70–46
117	August 13	@ Giants	2–3	Ortiz (13–8)	**Yoshii** (7–8)	Nen (26)	3Com Park	25,533	70–47
118	August 14	@ Giants	6–1	**Hershiser** (12–9)	Reuter (10–7)	—	3Com Park	57,853	71–47
119	August 15	@ Giants	12–5	**Rogers** (7–3)	Hernandez (6–11)	—	3Com Park	41,530	72–47
120	August 16	@ Padres	4–3 (10)	**Cook** (10–2)	Cunnane (2–1)	**Benitez** (14)	Qualcomm Stadium	21,974	73–47
121	August 17	@ Padres	2–3	Williams (6–11)	**Leiter** (10–8)	Hoffman (31)	Qualcomm Stadium	22,790	73–48
122	August 18	@ Padres	9–1	**Yoshii** (8–8)	Spencer (0–6)	—	Qualcomm Stadium	24,519	74–48
–	August 20	Cardinals	Postponed (rain); rescheduled for August 22						
123	August 21	Cardinals	7–4	**Mahomes** (7–0)	Mercker (6–5)	**Benitez** (15)	**Shea Stadium**	45,491	75–48
124	August 22 (1)	Cardinals	8–7	**Benitez** (2–2)	Bottalico (2–7)	—	**Shea Stadium**	N/A	76–48
125	August 22 (2)	Cardinals	5–7	Stephenson (4–0)	**Hershiser** (12–10)	Acevedo (4)	**Shea Stadium**	50,139	76–49
126	August 23	Astros	3–2	**Benitez** (3–2)	Powell (4–4)	—	**Shea Stadium**	39,292	77–49
127	August 24	Astros	1–5 (10)	Wagner (3–1)	**Cook** (10–3)	—	**Shea Stadium**	35,673	77–50
128	August 25	Astros	4–0	**Rogers** (8–3)	Reynolds (14–10)	**Cook** (3)	**Shea Stadium**	44,640	78–50
129	August 27	@ Diamondbacks	6–3	**Dotel** (5–1)	Daal (13–7)	**Benitez** (16)	Bank One Ballpark	42,581	79–50
130	August 28	@ Diamondbacks	3–5	Reynoso (10–2)	**Cook** (10–4)	Mantei (24)	Bank One Ballpark	47,076	79–51
131	August 29	@ Diamondbacks	4–8	Anderson (6–2)	**Leiter** (10–9)	Olson (14)	Bank One Ballpark	38,596	79–52
132	August 30	@ Astros	17–1	**Yoshii** (9–8)	Reynolds (14–11)	—	Astrodome	28,032	80–52
133	August 31	@ Astros	2–6	Lima (18–7)	**Wendell** (3–2)	—	Astrodome	24,982	80–53

September: (13–13) Home: 7–5; Away: 6–8

#	Date	Opponent	Score	Win	Loss	Save	Location	Attendance	Record
134	September 1	@ Astros	9–5	**Dotel** (6–1)	Holt (3–13)	—	Astrodome	24,112	81–53
135	September 3	Rockies	2–5 (10)	Leskanic (5–2)	**Wendell** (3–3)	Veres (27)	**Shea Stadium**	36,102	81–54
136	September 4	Rockies	4–2	**Leiter** (11–9)	Bohanon (11–11)	**Benitez** (17)	**Shea Stadium**	43,431	82–54
137	September 5	Rockies	6–2	**Yoshii** (10–8)	Kile (8–13)	—	**Shea Stadium**	49,117	83–54
138	September 6	Giants	3–0	**Rogers** (9–3)	Gardner (4–10)	—	**Shea Stadium**	35,727	84–54
139	September 7	Giants	4–7	Rodriguez (3–0)	**Wendell** (3–4)	Nen (32)	**Shea Stadium**	24,002	84–55
140	September 8	Giants	7–5	**Dotel** (7–1)	Estes (10–8)	**Benitez** (18)	**Shea Stadium**	26,499	85–55
141	September 9	@ Dodgers	3–1	**Hershiser** (13–10)	Brown (16–7)	**Benitez** (19)	Dodger Stadium	33,954	86–55
142	September 10	@ Dodgers	1–3	Dreifort (13–13)	**Leiter** (11–10)	Shaw (32)	Dodger Stadium	34,414	86–56
143	September 11	@ Dodgers	6–2	**Yoshii** (11–8)	Valdez (9–14)	—	Dodger Stadium	47,747	87–56
144	September 12	@ Dodgers	10–3	**Rogers** (10–3)	Gagne (0–1)	—	Dodger Stadium	34,685	88–56
145	September 13	@ Rockies	6–5	**Wendell** (4–4)	Veres (3–8)	**Benitez** (20)	Coors Field	40,547	89–56
146	September 14	@ Rockies	2–7	Wright (3–2)	**Dotel** (7–2)	—	Coors Field	41,090	89–57
147	September 15	@ Rockies	10–5	**Wendell** (5–4)	Dipoto (4–5)	**Benitez** (21)	Coors Field	41,820	90–57
148	September 17	Phillies	5–8	Wolf (6–8)	**Leiter** (11–11)	Brewer (2)	**Shea Stadium**	31,842	90–58
149	September 18	Phillies	11–1	**Yoshii** (12–8)	Grace (1–3)	—	**Shea Stadium**	37,655	91–58
150	September 19	Phillies	8–6	**Dotel** (8–2)	Byrd (14–10)	**Benitez** (22)	**Shea Stadium**	51,560	92–58
151	September 21	@ Braves	1–2	Remlinger (10–1)	**Cook** (10–5)	Rocker (34)	Turner Field	43,948	92–59
152	September 22	@ Braves	2–5	Glavine (12–11)	**Hershiser** (13–11)	Rocker (35)	Turner Field	47,520	92–60
153	September 23	@ Braves	3–6	Maddux (19–8)	**Leiter** (11–12)	Rocker (36)	Turner Field	49,228	92–61
154	September 24	@ Phillies	2–3	Grahe (1–3)	**Benitez** (3–3)	Aldred (1)	Veterans Stadium	21,649	92–62
155	September 25	@ Phillies	2–4	Person (9–7)	**Rogers** (10–4)	Gomes (19)	Veterans Stadium	23,319	92–63
156	September 26	@ Phillies	2–3	Byrd (15–10)	**Reed** (10–5)	Montgomery (1)	Veterans Stadium	26,370	92–64
157	September 28	Braves	3–9	Glavine (13–11)	**Hershiser** (13–12)	—	**Shea Stadium**	43,888	92–65
158	September 29	Braves	9–2	**Leiter** (12–12)	Maddux (19–9)	—	**Shea Stadium**	43,922	93–65
159	September 30	Braves	3–4 (11)	Mulholland (10–8)	**Dotel** (8–3)	—	**Shea Stadium**	48,364	93–66

October: (4–0) Home: 3–0; Away: 1–0

#	Date	Opponent	Score	Win	Loss	Save	Location	Attendance	Record
160	October 1	Pirates	3–2 (11)	**Mahomes** (8–0)	Sauerbeck (4–1)	—	**Shea Stadium**	29,528	94–66
161	October 2	Pirates	7–0	**Reed** (11–5)	Cordova (8–10)	—	**Shea Stadium**	36,878	95–66
162	October 3	Pirates	2–1	**Benitez** (4–3)	Hansell (1–3)	—	**Shea Stadium**	50,111	96–66
163	October 4	@ Reds	5–0	**Leiter** (13–12)	Parris (11–4)	—	Cinergy Field	54,621	97–66

== Postseason ==
=== Game log ===
1999 Postseason Game Log (5–5)
NL Division Series vs. Arizona Diamondbacks (3–1)

#	Date	Opponent	Score	Win	Loss	Save	Location	Attendance	Record
1	October 5	@ Diamondbacks	8–4	Wendell (1–0)	Johnson (0–1)	—	Bank One Ballpark	49,584	1–0
2	October 6	@ Diamondbacks	1–7	Stottlemyre (1–0)	Rogers (0–1)	—	Bank One Ballpark	49,328	1–1
3	October 8	Diamondbacks	9–2	Reed (1–0)	Daal (0–1)	—	Shea Stadium	56,180	2–1
4	October 9	Diamondbacks	4–3 (10)	Franco (1–0)	Mantei (0–1)	—	Shea Stadium	56,177	3–1

NL Championship Series vs. Atlanta Braves (2–4)

#	Date	Opponent	Score	Win	Loss	Save	Location	Attendance	Record
1	October 12	@ Braves	2–4	Maddux (1–0)	Yoshii (0–1)	Rocker (1)	Turner Field	44,172	0–1
2	October 13	@ Braves	3–4	Millwood (1–0)	Rogers (0–1)	Smoltz (1)	Turner Field	44,624	0–2
3	October 15	Braves	0–1	Glavine (1–0)	Leiter (0–1)	Rocker (2)	Shea Stadium	55,911	0–3
4	October 16	Braves	3–2	Wendell (1–0)	Remlinger (0–1)	Benitez (1)	Shea Stadium	55,872	1–3
5	October 17	Braves	4–3 (15)	Dotel (1–0)	McGlinchy (0–1)	—	Shea Stadium	55,723	2–3
6	October 19	@ Braves	9–10 (11)	Springer (1–0)	Rogers (0–2)	—	Turner Field	52,335	2–4

== Roster ==
1999 New York Mets
Roster
Pitchers: 43 Rigo Beltrán; 49 Armando Benítez; 27 Dennis Cook; 29 Octavio Dotel; 45 John Franco; 55 Orel Hershiser; 44 Jason Isringhausen; 28 Bobby Jones; 22 Al Leiter; 23 Pat Mahomes; 39 Josías Manzanillo; 34 Chuck McElroy; 36 Greg McMichael; 48 Dan Murray; 35 Rick Reed; 73 Kenny Rogers; 48 Glendon Rusch; 38 Jeff Tam; 26 Billy Taylor; 30 Allen Watson; 99 Turk Wendell; 21 Masato Yoshii	Catchers: 31 Mike Piazza; 7 Todd Pratt; 3 Vance Wilson; Infielders: 13 Edgardo Alfonzo; 15 Matt Franco; 17 Luis López; 5 John Olerud; 10 Rey Ordóñez; 30 Jorge Toca; 4 Robin Ventura	Outfielders: 50 Benny Agbayani; 46 Jermaine Allensworth; 25 Bobby Bonilla; 19 Roger Cedeño; 12 Shawon Dunston; 11 Shane Halter; 18 Darryl Hamilton; 24 Rickey Henderson; 33 Mike Kinkade; 56 Brian McRae; 6 Melvin Mora; 44 Jay Payton; Other batters: 26 Terrence Long	Manager: 2 Bobby Valentine; Coaches: 34 Bob Apodaca (pitching) (fired on June 6, 1999); 52 Dave Wallace (pitching); 20 Bruce Benedict (bench); 48 Randy Niemann (bullpen) (fired on June 6, 1999); 79 Koji Nagai (bullpen catcher); 53 Tom Robson (hitting) (fired on June 6, 1999); 53 Mickey Brantley (hitting); 54 Al Jackson (bullpen); 8 Cookie Rojas (third base); 1 Mookie Wilson (first base)

== Player stats ==
=== Batting ===
==== Starters by position ====
Note: Pos = Position; G = Games played; AB = At bats; H = Hits; Avg. = Batting average; HR = Home runs; RBI = Runs batted in

Pos	Player	G	AB	H	Avg.	HR	RBI
C	Mike Piazza	141	534	162	.303	40	124
1B	John Olerud	162	581	173	.298	19	96
2B	Edgardo Alfonzo	158	628	191	.304	27	108
3B	Robin Ventura	161	588	177	.301	32	120
SS	Rey Ordóñez	154	520	134	.258	1	60
LF	Rickey Henderson	121	438	138	.315	12	42
CF	Brian McRae	96	298	66	.221	8	36
RF	Roger Cedeño	155	453	142	.313	4	36

==== Other batters ====
Note: G = Games played; AB = At bats; H = Hits; Avg. = Batting average; HR = Home runs; RBI = Runs batted in

Player	G	AB	H	Avg.	HR	RBI
Benny Agbayani	101	276	79	.286	14	42
Darryl Hamilton	55	168	57	.339	5	21
Todd Pratt	71	140	41	.293	3	21
Matt Franco	122	132	31	.235	4	21
Bobby Bonilla	60	119	19	.160	4	18
Luis López	68	104	22	.212	2	13
Shawon Dunston	42	93	32	.344	0	16
Jermaine Allensworth	40	73	16	.219	3	9
Mike Kinkade	28	46	9	.196	2	6
Melvin Mora	66	31	5	.161	0	1
Jay Payton	13	8	2	.250	0	1
Terrence Long	3	3	0	.000	0	0
Jorge Toca	4	3	1	.333	0	0
Vance Wilson	1	0	0	----	0	0
Shane Halter	7	0	0	----	0	0

=== Pitching ===
==== Starting pitchers ====
Note: G = Games pitched; GS = Games started; IP = Innings pitched; W = Wins; L = Losses; ERA = Earned run average; SO = Strikeouts

Player	G	GS	IP	W	L	ERA	SO
Al Leiter	32	32	213.0	13	12	4.23	162
Orel Hershiser	32	32	179.0	13	12	4.58	89
Masato Yoshii	31	29	174.0	12	8	4.40	105
Rick Reed	26	26	149.1	11	5	4.58	104
Octavio Dotel	19	14	85.1	8	3	5.38	85
Kenny Rogers	12	12	76.0	5	1	4.03	58

==== Other pitchers ====
Note: G = Games pitched; IP = Innings pitched; W = Wins; L = Losses; ERA = Earned run average; SO = Strikeouts

Player	G	IP	W	L	ERA	SO
Bobby Jones	12	59.1	3	3	5.61	31
Allen Watson	14	39.2	2	2	4.08	32
Jason Isringhausen	13	39.1	1	3	6.41	31

==== Relief pitchers ====
Note: G = Games pitched; IP = Innings pitched; W = Wins; L = Losses; SV = Saves; ERA = Earned run average; SO = Strikeouts

Player	G	IP	W	L	SV	ERA	SO
Armando Benítez	77	78.0	4	3	22	1.85	128
Turk Wendell	80	85.2	5	4	3	3.05	77
Pat Mahomes	39	63.2	8	0	0	3.68	51
Dennis Cook	71	63.0	10	5	3	3.86	68
John Franco	46	40.2	0	2	19	2.88	41
Rigo Beltrán	21	31.0	1	1	0	3.48	35
Greg McMichael	19	18.2	1	1	0	4.82	18
Josías Manzanillo	12	18.2	0	0	0	5.79	25
Billy Taylor	18	13.1	0	1	0	8.10	14
Chuck McElroy	15	13.1	0	0	0	3.38	7
Jeff Tam	9	11.1	0	0	0	3.18	8
Matt Franco	2	1.1	0	0	0	13.50	2
Dan Murray	1	2.0	0	0	0	13.50	1
Glendon Rusch	1	1.0	0	0	0	0.00	0

== Awards and honors ==
All-Star Game

- Mike Piazza, Catcher, Starter

== Farm system ==
Level	Team	League	Manager
AAA	Norfolk Tides	International League	John Gibbons
AA	Binghamton Mets	Eastern League	Doug Davis
A	St. Lucie Mets	Florida State League	Howie Freiling
A	Capital City Bombers	South Atlantic League	Dave Engle
A-Short Season	Pittsfield Mets	New York–Penn League	Tony Tijerina
Rookie	Kingsport Mets	Appalachian League	Guy Conti
Rookie	GCL Mets	Gulf Coast League	John Stephenson

LEAGUE CHAMPIONS: GCL Mets
