= 1999 National League Championship Series =

Team (Wins)	Managers	Season
Atlanta Braves (4)	Bobby Cox	103–59 (.636), GA: 6 1/2
New York Mets (2)	Bobby Valentine	97–66 (.595), GB: 6 1/2
- Dates: October 12–19
- MVP: Eddie Pérez (Atlanta)
- Umpires: Ed Montague, Jeff Kellogg, Charlie Reliford, Ed Rapuano, Jerry Layne, Jerry Crawford

Broadcast
- Television: NBC (United States); MLB International (International)
- TV announcers: Bob Costas and Joe Morgan (NBC); Gary Thorne and Ken Singleton (MLB International)
- Radio: ESPN
- Radio announcers: Charley Steiner and Kevin Kennedy
- NLDS: Atlanta Braves over Houston Astros (3–1); New York Mets over Arizona Diamondbacks (3–1)

The 1999 National League Championship Series (NLCS), was a best-of-seven playoff series in Major League Baseball’s 1999 postseason pitting the overall #1 seeded Atlanta Braves and the fourth-seeded New York Mets for the National League pennant. The Series began on October 12 and ended on October 19. The Braves held home field advantage by virtue of having the better regular season record.

The Braves defeated the Mets in the NLCS in six games, and would go on to lose to the New York Yankees in the World Series in four-game sweep.

This was the first edition of the postseason where both teams from New York City appeared in the LCS, a phenomenon that has only repeated twice since (2000, 2024).

== Background ==
After the Mets lost eight of nine games in September — including five of six to the NL East rival Braves — the Mets seemed unlikely to make the playoffs, two games out of the wild card lead with three games to play.

Following the Mets' most recent defeat in this stretch, an 11-inning loss to Atlanta at Shea Stadium, Braves third baseman Chipper Jones was quoted as saying, "Now all the Mets fans can go home and put their Yankees stuff on." Braves closer John Rocker was also quoted as saying he hated the Mets, and "How many times you gotta beat a team before the fans finally shut up?" Thinking they had buried the Mets, the Braves had closed out their season with another division title and were poised to enter the playoffs and leave the Mets behind.

However, the Mets swept their season-ending three-game series with the Pittsburgh Pirates at Shea Stadium, while the wild-card-leading Cincinnati Reds lost two out of three to the Milwaukee Brewers. The Mets and Reds had the same record at 95–66 heading into an eventful final day of the season. That Sunday saw the Mets win their game, 2–1, on a wild pitch in the bottom of the ninth; the Reds avoided the sweep in Milwaukee following a seven-hour rain delay. Both teams finished even with records of 96–66 after 162 games.

The Atlanta Braves captured their eighth consecutive division title with a league-best record, 103-59. Third-baseman, Chipper Jones, was the National League's Most Valuable Player with a .319 batting average, 45 HR's, and 110 RBI. A major factor in his selection as MVP was his performance against the New York Mets. The Braves led the National League East by only one game as they entered a three-game September series against the Mets, the team that was right on their heels. Atlanta swept the series at Turner Field, though, largely thanks to Jones, who hit four home runs and drove in seven of the 13 runs that the Braves scored. For the season, he hit .319 with a .510 on-base percentage, a 1.000 slugging percentage, and seven home runs against the Mets.

Per MLB rules, the one game wild card playoff was held the next day, October 4, at Cincinnati's Cinergy Field. Al Leiter shut down the Reds with a two-hit shutout in a 5–0 Mets victory, sending New York to its first playoff berth since 1988 (as the wild card team, the Mets would be scheduled to play the division winner with the best record. However, since that team came from their own division — the 103–59 Braves, who also had the best record in baseball — New York faced the team with the second best record, the 100–62 Arizona Diamondbacks).

In the National League Division Series, both the Mets and Braves would advance in four games. The Mets would defeat the Arizona Diamondbacks, with the series ending on a walk-off home run by seldom-used backup catcher Todd Pratt, only playing due to a thumb injury to star catcher Mike Piazza. The Braves would vanquish the Houston Astros in four games, with Brian Jordan and eventual National League MVP Chipper Jone leading the way. And that would set up a National League Championship Series that was anticipated by many, pitting two bitter rivals against each other on the national stage. This marked the Braves' record eighth-straight appearance in the NLCS, while the Mets advanced to the league championship for the first time since 1988. This would be the second time that the Braves and Mets met in the NLCS. The two teams met in the very first National League Championship Series in 1969, with the Mets sweeping the then best-of-five set.

Prior to Game 1, Mets Manager Bobby Valentine chided the Braves, saying that "They better be ready to play some ghosts, because we were dead and buried two weeks ago," in reference to earlier statements by Chipper Jones. When the series shifted to Shea Stadium in New York, raucous Mets fans would continually jeer Jones, chanting "LARRY!" (his given name) in derision every time he stepped to the plate. John Rocker also riled up fans, as he would often pretend to toss baseballs into the stands, and got into several arguments.

This was Atlanta's eighth straight NLCS appearance, excluding the strike-shortened 1994 season.

== Summary ==
=== Atlanta Braves vs. New York Mets ===
Atlanta won the series, 4–2.

Game	Date	Score	Location	Time	Attendance
1	October 12	New York Mets – 2, Atlanta Braves – 4	Turner Field	3:09	44,172
2	October 13	New York Mets – 3, Atlanta Braves – 4	Turner Field	2:42	44,624
3	October 15	Atlanta Braves – 1, New York Mets – 0	Shea Stadium	3:04	55,911
4	October 16	Atlanta Braves – 2, New York Mets – 3	Shea Stadium	2:20	55,872
5	October 17	Atlanta Braves – 3, New York Mets – 4 (15)	Shea Stadium	5:46	55,723
6	October 19	New York Mets – 9, Atlanta Braves – 10 (11)	Turner Field	4:25	52,335

== Game summaries ==
=== Game 1 ===
October 12, 1999 8:12 p.m. (EDT) at Turner Field in Atlanta, Georgia 63 °F (17 °C), cloudy
Team	1	2	3	4	5	6	7	8	9	R	H	E
New York	0	0	0	1	0	0	0	0	1	2	6	2
Atlanta	1	0	0	0	1	1	0	1	X	4	8	2
WP: Greg Maddux (1–0) LP: Masato Yoshii (0–1) Sv: John Rocker (1); Home runs: NYM: None; ATL: Eddie Pérez (1); Attendance: 44,172; Boxscore

The Braves began their eighth consecutive NLCS with a 4–2 victory over the Mets, defeating a team they left for dead two weeks earlier. They struck first in the first off of Masato Yoshii when Gerald Williams hit a leadoff single, stole second and scored on Brett Boone's single. The Mets tied it in the fourth on Mike Piazza's groundout with runners on first and third. The Braves retook the lead when Walt Weiss, who went 3 for 4, doubled to lead off the fifth, moved to third on a sacrifice bunt and scored on Williams's single. Future NLCS MVP Eddie Pérez's home run next inning off of Pat Mahomes made it 3–1 Braves. Andruw Jones walked to lead off the eighth off of Turk Wendell, moved to second on a sacrifice bunt, and scored on Weiss's single. Greg Maddux tossed seven solid innings and John Rocker recorded the final four outs for the save, his second of the postseason, despite allowing an RBI single to Todd Pratt in the ninth to seal Atlanta's fourth straight win.

=== Game 2 ===
October 13, 1999 4:09 p.m. (EDT) at Turner Field in Atlanta, Georgia 62 °F (17 °C), cloudy
Team	1	2	3	4	5	6	7	8	9	R	H	E
New York	0	1	0	0	1	0	0	1	0	3	5	1
Atlanta	0	0	0	0	0	4	0	0	X	4	9	1
WP: Kevin Millwood (1–0) LP: Kenny Rogers (0–1) Sv: John Smoltz (1); Home runs: NYM: Melvin Mora (1); ATL: Brian Jordan (1), Eddie Pérez (2); Attendance: 44,624; Boxscore

Kevin Millwood held the Mets in check to win his second straight postseason start, allowing three runs—two earned—over 7 1/3 innings.

The Mets struck first in the second on Roger Cedeño's RBI single with two on, then made it 2–0 on Melvin Mora's home run in the fifth.

In the sixth, Chipper Jones walked before Brian Jordan's home run tied the game. After Andruw Jones singled, Eddie Pérez's home run off of Mets starter Kenny Rogers put the Braves up 4–2.

The Mets cut the lead to 4–3 in the eighth when Mora reached on third baseman Jones's error and scored on Edgardo Alfonso's double. John Rocker relieved Millwood and ended the inning without further damage, but after pitching 1 1/3 innings in Game 1, manager Bobby Cox turned to Game 4 starter John Smoltz for the ninth. Smoltz retired the Mets in order to give the Braves a 2–0 series lead.

=== Game 3 ===
October 15, 1999 8:12 p.m. (EDT) at Shea Stadium in Queens, New York 56 °F (13 °C), clear
Team	1	2	3	4	5	6	7	8	9	R	H	E
Atlanta	1	0	0	0	0	0	0	0	0	1	3	1
New York	0	0	0	0	0	0	0	0	0	0	7	2
WP: Tom Glavine (1–0) LP: Al Leiter (0–1) Sv: John Rocker (2); Attendance: 55,911; Boxscore

Tom Glavine pitched seven shutout innings and the Braves edged the Mets, 1–0, to take a commanding three-games-to-none lead in the NLCS. The only run of the game scored in the first inning without the need for a base hit. The lead-off runner was walked, and two throwing errors by Al Leiter and Mike Piazza allowed the lead-off runner to score. This would cost the Mets the win despite seven stellar innings from Leiter.

In 1996, the Braves won the first two games of the World Series against the Yankees. In Game 3, the Yankees rallied to beat Glavine and took the series in six games. With a superb effort from its two-time Cy Young Award winner, Atlanta avoided that fate here, setting up the possibility of its fifth World Series in the 1990s with a win in Game 4.

After Mike Remlinger worked a perfect eighth, Shea Stadium villain John Rocker perfectly played the part with a scoreless ninth. After Benny Agbayani reached on an error, the animated left-hander struck out pinch-hitter Todd Pratt, got Melvin Mora on a deep fly to right-center field and Rey Ordóñez on a weak force play.

The Mets faced an obstacle that no team in baseball history had overcome: rally from a 3–0 deficit to win a playoff series (the Boston Red Sox would become the first team ever to do it in the 2004 ALCS).

=== Game 4 ===
October 16, 1999 7:42 p.m. (EDT) at Shea Stadium in Queens, New York 66 °F (19 °C), clear
Team	1	2	3	4	5	6	7	8	9	R	H	E
Atlanta	0	0	0	0	0	0	0	2	0	2	3	0
New York	0	0	0	0	0	1	0	2	X	3	5	0
WP: Turk Wendell (1–0) LP: Mike Remlinger (0–1) Sv: Armando Benítez (1); Home runs: ATL: Brian Jordan (2), Ryan Klesko (1); NYM: John Olerud (1); Attendance: 55,872; Boxscore

The Mets struck first in Game 4 on John Olerud's home run in the sixth off of Braves' starter John Smoltz, but back-to-back leadoff home runs by Brian Jordan and Ryan Klesko off of Mets' starter Rick Reed put the Braves up 2–1. Reed pitched seven innings and gave up just those two runs.

The Braves were four outs from a series sweep and their fifth trip to the World Series in the 1990s but failed to hold the slim lead in the bottom of the eighth. Smoltz allowed a leadoff single to Roger Cedeño and got one more out before his night ended in favor of setup man Mike Remlinger. Remlinger struck out pinch hitter Benny Agbayani, but allowed Cedeno to steal second and walked pinch hitter Melvin Mora to put men on first and second. The Braves then called on John Rocker, who had treated the Mets and their fans with similar disdain during the season. The left-handed closer saved five games against New York during the regular season and two in this series. During the season, he said he hated the Mets and prior to this showdown wondered how many times the Braves would have to beat them before their fans would "shut up."

In a pivotal at-bat, Olerud got the better of Rocker. After a double steal put both men in scoring position, Olerud's two-run single put the Mets up 3–2 and Armando Benitez retired the Braves in order in the ninth to keep New York in the NLCS.

=== Game 5 ===
October 17, 1999 4:09 p.m. (EDT) at Shea Stadium in Queens, New York 67 °F (19 °C), cloudy
Team	1	2	3	4	5	6	7	8	9	10	11	12	13	14	15	R	H	E
Atlanta	0	0	0	2	0	0	0	0	0	0	0	0	0	0	1	3	13	2
New York	2	0	0	0	0	0	0	0	0	0	0	0	0	0	2	4	11	1
WP: Octavio Dotel (1–0) LP: Kevin McGlinchy (0–1); Home runs: ATL: None; NYM: John Olerud (2); Attendance: 55,723; Boxscore

Robin Ventura's bases-loaded blast off Kevin McGlinchy with one out in the bottom of the 15th inning kept the Mets' season alive with a 4–3 victory over the Braves in Game 5 of the NLCS. Ventura never made it home because he was mobbed by his teammates between first and second. Official scorer Red Foley ruled the hit a single; in later years, it was noted as among the best moments in franchise history.

The game began shortly after 4 p.m. with Greg Maddux pitching for Atlanta and Masato Yoshii starting for the Mets. The Mets took an early 2–0 lead in the bottom of the first inning as John Olerud hit his second home run in as many days with Rickey Henderson on first. The lead lasted into the fourth inning, when Atlanta struck back with consecutive doubles by Bret Boone and Chipper Jones, eventually knotting the score at 2–2 when Brian Jordan singled home Jones. Mets Manager Bobby Valentine was immediately prompted to remove Yoshii from the game in favor of Orel Hershiser, which began a run on pitching changes that resulted in the Mets emptying their bullpen by game's end, relying on starter Kenny Rogers and rookie Octavio Dotel for key innings, and might have gone to Game 4's starter Rick Reed had the game progressed past the 15th inning. In all, the Mets used a postseason record nine pitchers in this game.

The game continued on well into the night, accompanied by a steady rainfall which did not delay the game. Although both teams mounted some threats as the game continued, neither team was able to break through for the tie-breaking run. Atlanta eventually set a mark for futility, stranding a record 19 men on base over the course of the game. A most notable failure occurred in the 13th inning, with two out and Keith Lockhart on first base and Jones at the plate. With Lockhart running, Jones laced an offering from Dotel into the right field corner. But the ball was cut off by Melvin Mora before it reached the wall, and Mora's strong relay throw, via Edgardo Alfonzo, cut down Lockhart at the plate and ended the inning.

Pitching on his 25th birthday, local villain John Rocker entered the game in the bottom of the 13th inning to a loud chorus of boos and several projectiles hurled in his direction. He retired four batters over 1 1/3 innings, including a strikeout of the ailing Mike Piazza. Upon being removed from the game, Rocker mocked the Shea Stadium fans by pretending to boo, and yelled at fans sitting around the Atlanta dugout as he left the field.

The Mets' season appeared over after Lockhart tripled home Walt Weiss from first in the top of the 15th off Dotel to put the Braves ahead 3–2 and put them three outs away from going to the World Series. However, Kevin McGlinchy could not hold the lead. Shawon Dunston, who misplayed Lockhart's triple, atoned with a leadoff single after fouling off several pitches with a full count. With pinch-hitter Matt Franco batting, Dunston stole second base. Franco eventually worked out a walk, which was followed by Edgardo Alfonzo laying down a sacrifice bunt to move Dunston to third. Olerud—whose homer in the first was now a distant memory—was intentionally walked to load the bases.

Todd Pratt, again thrust into the spotlight with Piazza nursing several injuries, hit next. McGlinchy walked Todd Pratt on five pitches to tie the game at three runs apiece. He then fell behind the slumping Ventura. At 9:47 p.m., McGlinchy grooved a fastball on a 2–1 count, and Ventura launched it through the steady rain and over the right-field fence. Although Ventura had seen the ball clear the wall, and was waving Pratt around the bases, Pratt tackled Ventura between first and second base, and most of the Mets team ran out on the field and mobbed Ventura in a wild scene.

Mets manager Bobby Valentine said following the game

Robin Ventura played it out on one leg all day. There were times I thought about taking him out, but he told me 'No, I'm okay, no, I can go,' and now he comes up with the winning hit, it's gotta be poetic justice. Justice indeed.

Valentine was speaking in reference to a calf injury that had been bothering Ventura during the postseason, and had led to his entering this game without a hit in the series. NBC's Bob Costas gushed on the air following Ventura's blast,

I'll tell you, these Mets are Rasputin-like. You cannot put them away. They will not die.

At the time, the game was the longest in terms of elapsed time in postseason history, clocking in at 5 hours, 46 minutes. It was surpassed in 2004 by Game 5 of the American League Championship Series between the Boston Red Sox and the New York Yankees (5:49), and again in 2005 in Game 4 of the National League Division Series between the Houston Astros and the Atlanta Braves (5:50), and once more in 2014 in Game 2 the NLDS between the San Francisco Giants and the Washington Nationals at Nationals Park (6:23). These were all surpassed by the current record, which is held by Game 3 of the 2018 World Series between the Red Sox and the Los Angeles Dodgers that took 7:20 to play. Ventura narrowly missed out on becoming the first player to hit a walk-off postseason grand slam, which would not occur until Nelson Cruz did so in Game 2 of the 2011 American League Championship Series.

This Mets victory marked just the second time in baseball history that a team had come back from a three games to none deficit in a best-of-seven series to make it to a Game 6. Coincidentally, the Braves from the previous year's NLCS against the San Diego Padres were the first.

=== Game 6 ===
October 19, 1999 8:12 p.m. (EDT) at Turner Field in Atlanta, Georgia 64 °F (18 °C), cloudy
Team	1	2	3	4	5	6	7	8	9	10	11	R	H	E
New York	0	0	0	0	0	3	4	1	0	1	0	9	15	2
Atlanta	5	0	0	0	0	2	0	1	0	1	1	10	10	1
WP: Russ Springer (1–0) LP: Kenny Rogers (0–2); Home runs: NYM: Mike Piazza (1); ATL: None; Attendance: 52,335; Boxscore

Kevin Millwood started for Atlanta, while Al Leiter took the start on only three days' rest for the Mets.

Leiter, unaccustomed to throwing on short rest, was tattooed in the first inning. He hit Gerald Williams with a pitch and walked Bret Boone to lead off, then catcher Mike Piazza's errant throw to third on Williams's base-stealing attempt allowed him to score and move Boone to third. After Chipper Jones was hit by a pitch, Brian Jordan's RBI single scored Boone. After Andruw Jones's fielder's choice loaded the bases, Eddie Perez's two-run single knocked Leiter out of the game. Pat Mahomes relieved Leiter and Brian Hunter's sacrifice fly made it 5–0 Braves. With Millwood looking sharp and the Mets bats quiet, it appeared through the early innings to be an Atlanta cakewalk.

Once again, the Mets had other thoughts in mind. Millwood began to tire in the sixth. An Edgardo Alfonzo leadoff double was followed by John Olerud's single before Piazza's sacrifice fly put the Mets on the board. After Robin Ventura doubled, Darryl Hamilton's single made it 5–3 Braves.

Atlanta scraped back for two runs in their half of the sixth, courtesy of a José Hernández two-run single off Dennis Cook, with both runs charged to Turk Wendell.

John Smoltz entered the game in relief for Atlanta in the seventh and after Matt Franco and Rickey Henderson hit back-to-back lead-off doubles, John Olerud singled home another run to make the score 7–5. This brought up Mike Piazza, who blasted a long home run to right off Smoltz to tie the score at 7–7.

Bob Costas said as Piazza capped the Mets incredible comeback, "Tied at seven, hoping for Game 7!"

With the game now tied and in the hands of two completely exhausted bullpens, the game became a test of wills. The Mets took an 8–7 lead in the eighth, as rookie Melvin Mora, a virtual unknown, singled home Benny Agbayani off of Mike Remlinger. But then, with all the momentum going the Mets' way, the Braves rallied back against John Franco in the bottom of the eighth. With one out, Eddie Perez singled. Otis Nixon pinch-ran for Perez, and took the momentum back by stealing second base and going to third when Piazza's throw went into center field. Brian Hunter singled home the tying run.

In the tenth inning, the Mets once again regained the lead, and again Mora was in the center of things. His one-out single off John Rocker put Agbayani in position to score on Todd Pratt's sacrifice fly, but, again, Atlanta rallied to tie in the last of the tenth, with Ozzie Guillén singling home Andruw Jones off Armando Benítez to re-knot the game at 9–9.

Finally, in the 11th, the Mets' magic ran out. Kenny Rogers entered the game (although most had speculated that it would be rookie Octavio Dotel) and gave up a leadoff double to Gerald Williams. A Bret Boone sacrifice bunt moved Williams to third with one out. Following intentional walks to Chipper Jones and Brian Jordan to load the bases, Rogers walked Andruw Jones on a 3–2 pitch to score Williams and win the pennant for Atlanta on a walk-off walk. It marked the first time a postseason game had ever ended on a walk.

== Composite line score ==
1999 NLCS (4–2): Atlanta Braves over New York Mets

Team	1	2	3	4	5	6	7	8	9	10	11	12	13	14	15	R	H	E
Atlanta Braves	7	0	0	2	1	7	0	4	0	1	1	0	0	0	1	24	46	7
New York Mets	2	1	0	1	1	4	4	4	1	1	0	0	0	0	2	21	49	8
Total attendance: 308,637 Average attendance: 51,440

== Aftermath ==
Mets catcher Mike Piazza's struggles in the series were a major factor in the Braves victory. Piazza batted a mere .167, going 4-for-24 with one extra-base hit. The Braves took advantage of Piazza's limited defensive abilities, running relentlessly on the star backstop and stealing 14 bases in 18 attempts. By contrast, the Braves were led by backup catcher, Eddie Pérez, who was filling in for injured starting catcher, Javy López. Perez went 10-for-20 with 2 doubles, 2 homeruns, and 5 RBI. Each of Perez's homeruns was a game-winning hit. Perez also played a significant role in the crazy Game 6 win. He chased Al Leiter with a two-run single that capped Atlanta's five-run first inning. After the Mets took an 8–7 lead in the top of the eighth, Perez singled in the bottom half and was replaced by pinch-runner Otis Nixon. Nixon scored on Brian Hunter's game-tying single. For his outstanding performance, Perez would be named the NLCS MVP.

Moments after Game 6 went final, NBC color commentator Joe Morgan said, "We've finally reached the closing night on the best Mets show since [their championship season of] 1986."

The Braves advanced to the World Series appearing in their fifth World Series of the 1990s. Physically and emotionally spent following this series, they did not put up much of a fight as they were swept by the other New York City team, the Yankees. The normally potent Braves offense batted just .200 against Yankee pitching.

This series proved to be a harbinger of many events that would shape the 2000 baseball season. Rocker would go on to make several controversial remarks in a Sports Illustrated article. Jones would be heckled mercilessly by Mets fans, something that would continue until his retirement. Jones earned the label of "Met killer" - 49 of Jones' 468 career dingers, third-most by a switch-hitter in baseball history — came at the expense of the Mets. The Braves again won the NL East and relegated the Mets to the Wild Card in 2000. The Mets, however, ended up in the World Series, in which they fell to the Yankees. With the Braves being swept by the St. Louis Cardinals in the NLDS, it shaped a perception that the Mets would have an easier path to the World Series.

In 2011, Fangraphs, via a mathematical formula, called the 1999 NLCS the best postseason series of all-time.

The Atlanta Braves' dominance continued as they went on to capture an MLB record, 14 consecutive division titles. Chipper Jones, Greg Maddux, Tom Glavine, John Smoltz, and manager Bobby Cox were all inducted into the Hall of Fame, as would Mets' catcher, Mike Piazza and outfielder, Rickey Henderson.

The Braves would not win another pennant until their 2021 championship season. One of the Braves coaches on that championship team was none other than the 1999 NLCS MVP, Eddie Perez. The most recent pennant for the Mets was in 2015, but they still have not won a world championship since 1986.
