= Brian McRae =

American baseball player (born 1967)

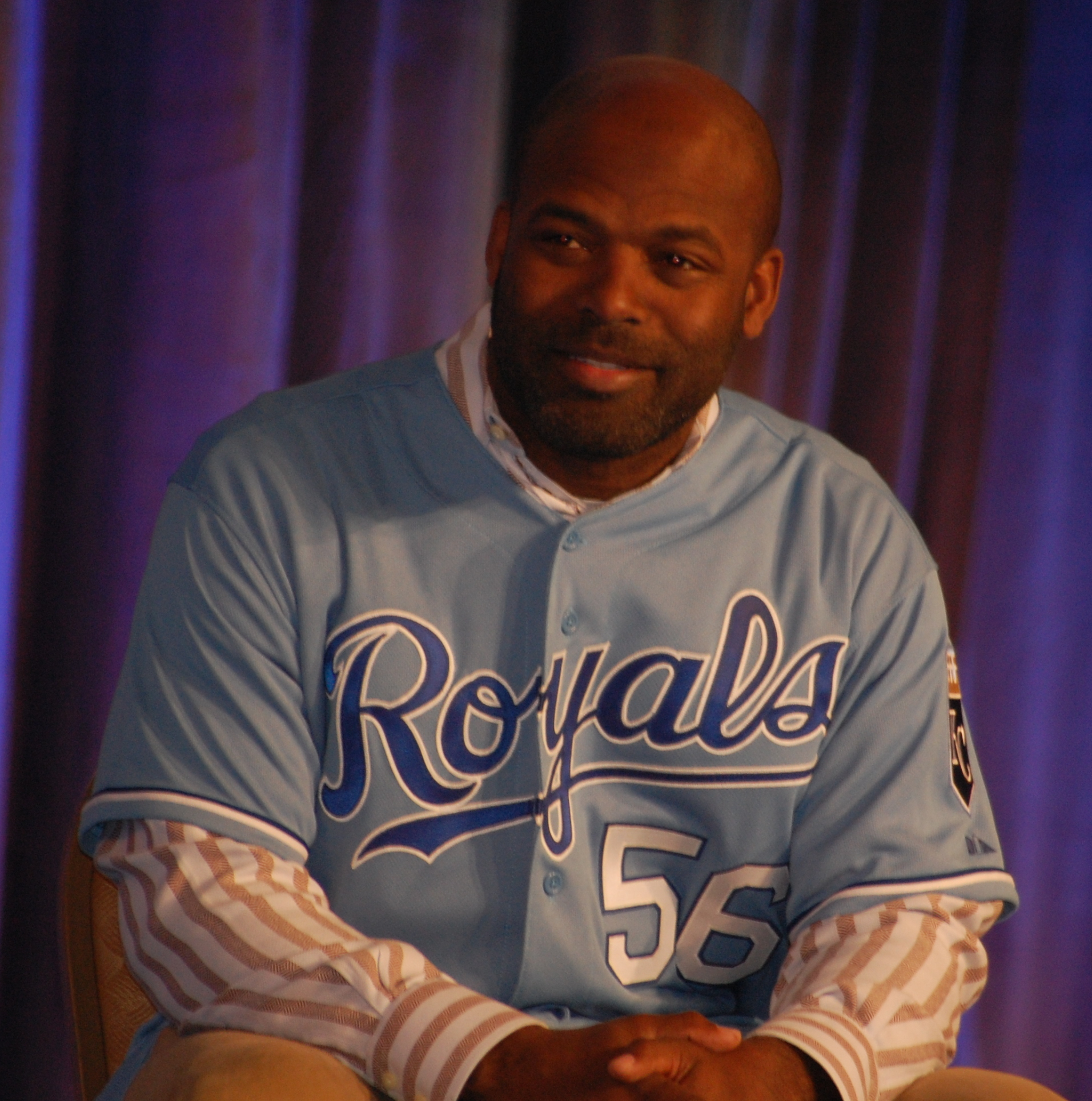
- McRae in 2011

Park Pirates
- Center fielder / Coach
- Born: August 27, 1967 (age 58); Bradenton, Florida, U.S.
- Batted: Switch Threw: Right

MLB debut
- August 7, 1990, for the Kansas City Royals

Last MLB appearance
- October 3, 1999, for the Toronto Blue Jays

MLB statistics
- Batting average: .261
- Home runs: 103
- Runs batted in: 532
- Stats at Baseball Reference

Teams
- Kansas City Royals (1990–1994); Chicago Cubs (1995–1997); New York Mets (1997–1999); Colorado Rockies (1999); Toronto Blue Jays (1999)

Brian Wesley McRae (/məˈkreɪ/; born August 27, 1967) is an American former center fielder in Major League Baseball who played for the Kansas City Royals, Chicago Cubs, New York Mets, Colorado Rockies and Toronto Blue Jays from 1990 to 1999. McRae is the son of former major league All-Star, Hal McRae, and was also managed by the elder McRae for four seasons with Kansas City. It was only the fourth occurrence of a major league manager managing his own son.

McRae was a switch hitter and threw right-handed. His batting average was 38 points higher from the right side with a slugging average 24 points higher but his on-base percentage was only seven points higher. McRae was a leadoff batter far more often (47%) than any other position in the lineup (second most was 22% batting second). He had a good history of injury avoidance, playing 150 or more games in five different seasons. The only seasons he did not play at least 130 games were his rookie season and the strike-shortened 1994 season when he finished second in the National League in games played. McRae never played in the playoffs, enduring a few near misses.

== Early career and Kansas City ==
Born in Bradenton, Florida, McRae attended Manatee High School and Blue Springs High School where he was a Missouri 2nd Team All State Selection in football and 1st Team selection baseball. In 1985, McRae was predicted to be a lower-round draft pick in baseball. When he claimed that he would attend college and play both sports, the University of Kansas offered him a football scholarship. When the Kansas City Royals defied the predictions and chose the 17-year-old McRae in the first round (as the 17th pick), offering him a six-figure signing bonus, he changed his mind and bypassed college sports altogether.

McRae did not hit particularly well in the Royals' minor league system and did not reach AA until his fourth season. He did steal bases well though with 88 thefts in his first three seasons. He and his father, long-time Royal Hal McRae, became the first father-son combination to appear in a major league game when they were in the lineup together in a spring training game in 1987. McRae hit only .201 for the Memphis Chicks in 1988 and only .227 in 1989. In 1990, Kansas City's regular center fielder, two-sport all-star Bo Jackson, was having the best season of his baseball career when he went on the disabled list with a shoulder injury. After trying veterans Jim Eisenreich and Willie Wilson in center, the Royals gave McRae a chance in early August. He responded by posting a better average in the majors than in any of his three seasons at AA. When he returned from the disabled list, Jackson was moved to left field and McRae became the everyday center fielder for the rest of that season and for the four subsequent seasons as well.

The Royals named Hal McRae as the team's manager for 1991. With a firm hold on the center field job, Brian McRae posted largely average offensive statistics in Kansas City. On July 14, 1991, he set his career high with six RBI on a two-run home run and a grand slam, all from the leadoff spot, in an 18-4 rout in Detroit. Less than a week later, he started a career-best 22-game hitting streak, which lasted from July 20 to August 13. 1993 was his best offensive season with the Royals in several categories but he also logged a career-worst 105 strikeouts.

== Journeyman ==
In 1994, McRae's salary jumped from less than $400,000 to $1.9 million. He was in the top ten in the American League in singles and stolen bases when the 1994 strike ended the season in August. Shortly before the strike ended in April 1995, McRae was traded to the Chicago Cubs for two players who combined to play only eight games in the majors after the trade. He responded to the trade by finishing fourth in the National League with 167 hits, and second with a career-high 38 doubles while leading the league with 580 at bats. In 1996, he set career highs with 111 runs scored and 37 stolen bases while being caught stealing only nine times for a career-best 80% success rate.

The Cubs were paying McRae $3.9 million for 1997 but his numbers declined and the Cubs were sinking to the bottom of the division. On April 4, McRae was the batter for the first pitch ever thrown at Turner Field. In August, they traded him with Mel Rojas and Turk Wendell to the New York Mets in exchange for Lance Johnson, Mark Clark and Manny Alexander. McRae's statistics stayed largely below the league average for the rest of the season. The Mets missed the postseason for the ninth consecutive season.

Although his numbers declined in 1997, in 1998, McRae led the Mets in doubles, triples and stolen bases while setting career highs in home runs, RBI, walks and slugging. He also led the team in caught stealing and strikeouts. On September 14, McRae hit a dramatic game-tying two-run home run in the ninth inning off the Houston Astros' ace closer, Billy Wagner. The Mets went on to win that game but narrowly missed the playoffs.

In 1999, McRae was still being paid over $3.5 million but was batting only .221 for the Mets. At the trade deadline, New York traded him with Rigo Beltrán and a minor leaguer to the Colorado Rockies in exchange for Darryl Hamilton and Chuck McElroy (the Mets went on to reach the 1999 NLCS). Just nine days later, McRae was re-traded to the Toronto Blue Jays for minor league pitcher Pat Lynch. After hitting just .195 for Toronto, he was benched in favor of Vernon Wells. After the season, McRae was granted free agency and his career was over.

== Post-career ==
While at the University of Kansas, Brian McRae studied broadcast journalism. During his days with the Cubs, he spent time as an in-studio analyst for WGN-TV and SportsChannel. After his playing days ended, McRae worked for MLB.com radio for five years as well as working on ESPN's Baseball Tonight. He also became a part owner of WHB 810 AM in Kansas City.

McRae has devoted time to Big Brothers Big Sisters of America and the Cystic Fibrosis Foundation. McRae also helped organize the 50 In 50 Charity with two friends. They'll play on 50 golf courses in 50 states in 50 days to raise over $1 million for cancer research.

McRae also finds time to coach NAIA Park University, located in Kansas City. He also coaches young kids at baseball camps in Kansas City.

On August 19, 2016, McRae signed a two-year contract as Head Coach of the WCL League Victoria HarbourCats.

== See also ==
- List of Major League Baseball career stolen bases leaders
- List of second-generation Major League Baseball players
