= 1999 National League Wild Card tie-breaker game =

1999 Major League Baseball tie-breaker game

	1	2	3	4	5	6	7	8	9	R	H	E
New York Mets	2	0	1	0	1	1	0	0	0	5	9	0
Cincinnati Reds	0	0	0	0	0	0	0	0	0	0	2	0
- Date: October 4, 1999
- Venue: Cinergy Field
- City: Cincinnati, Ohio
- Umpires: HP: Bruce Froemming; 1B: Gerry Davis; 2B: Mark Hirschbeck; 3B: Ed Rapuano; LF: Rich Rieker; RF: Jeff Nelson
- Attendance: 54,621
- Television: ESPN
- TV announcers: Jon Miller and Joe Morgan
- Radio: ESPN; WFAN (NYM); WLW (CIN)
- Radio announcers: ESPN: Charley Steiner and Dave Campbell; WFAN: Bob Murphy and Gary Cohen; WLW: Marty Brennaman and Joe Nuxhall

The 1999 National League Wild Card tie-breaker game was a one-game extension to Major League Baseball's (MLB) 1999 regular season, played between the New York Mets and Cincinnati Reds to determine the winner of the National League (NL) wild card. It was played at Cinergy Field in Cincinnati, on October 4, 1999. The Mets won the game, 5–0, with starting pitcher Al Leiter pitching a two-hit shutout. As a result, the Mets qualified for the postseason and the Reds did not.

The game was necessary after both teams finished the season with identical win–loss records of 96–66. Some described the Mets as collapsing late in the season while the race between the Reds and their division rival Houston Astros was close enough to create the possibility of a three-way tie. The Reds won a coin flip late in the season which, by rule at the time, awarded them home field for the game. Upon winning, the Mets advanced to National League Division Series (NLDS) where they defeated the Arizona Diamondbacks, 3 games to 1. They then advanced to the National League Championship Series (NLCS) but were defeated by the Atlanta Braves, 4 games to 2. This game counted as the 163rd regular-season game by both teams, with all events in the game added to regular-season statistics.

== Background ==
The Mets spent 34 days of the 1999 season leading the National League East Division, but—following a seven-game losing streak from September 21–28 along with an eight-game winning streak by their division rival Atlanta Braves from September 19–28 — the Braves took a commanding 8-game lead in the division that they did not relinquish. Meanwhile, the Reds and Houston Astros were in a close race for the National League Central Division. The Astros led the division for much of the season, but did not lead by more than three games after August 1 except for one day. Ultimately, the Astros won the division with a 97–65 record, one game ahead of the 96–66 Reds. The Astros won their 97th game on the final day of the season. If Houston had not won that game, the Astros, Reds, and Mets would have instead been in a three-way tie for both the NL Central and the wild card spot. Bob Costas suggested that MLB was lucky to avoid this situation as he believed they had "no reasonable tiebreaker" to deal with it. Had this three-way tie arisen, the Mets would have won the wild card while the Astros and Reds would have played a tie-breaker for the Central Division title (as the tiebreaker counts as a regular season game, the Reds/Astros loser would have moved to 96–67, 1/2 game worse than the Mets).

The Mets' losing streak late in the season led Jayson Stark to label them a "sinking ship" in a column on September 30. However, the Mets broke this streak with a win over the Braves and dominant pitcher Greg Maddux and then, following a loss, swept three games from the Pittsburgh Pirates to end the season, tying the Reds' 96–66 record. The New York Daily News described this late-season performance as an "agonizing roller coaster ride" for Mets fans. With the Mets and Reds holding the best non-division winning records in the league a tie-breaker was necessary to determine the wild-card winner. Bob Costas said at the time he did not like the wild-card system as he believed it "diminishes the drama and authenticity of a pennant race", although he approved of the playoff teams in 1999. Tim McCarver disagreed, arguing that the late-season race between the Mets, Astros, and Reds showed the excitement a wild card can add to the season. A coin flip conducted earlier that September set Cincinnati's Cinergy Field as the location for the tie-breaker game.

== Game summary ==
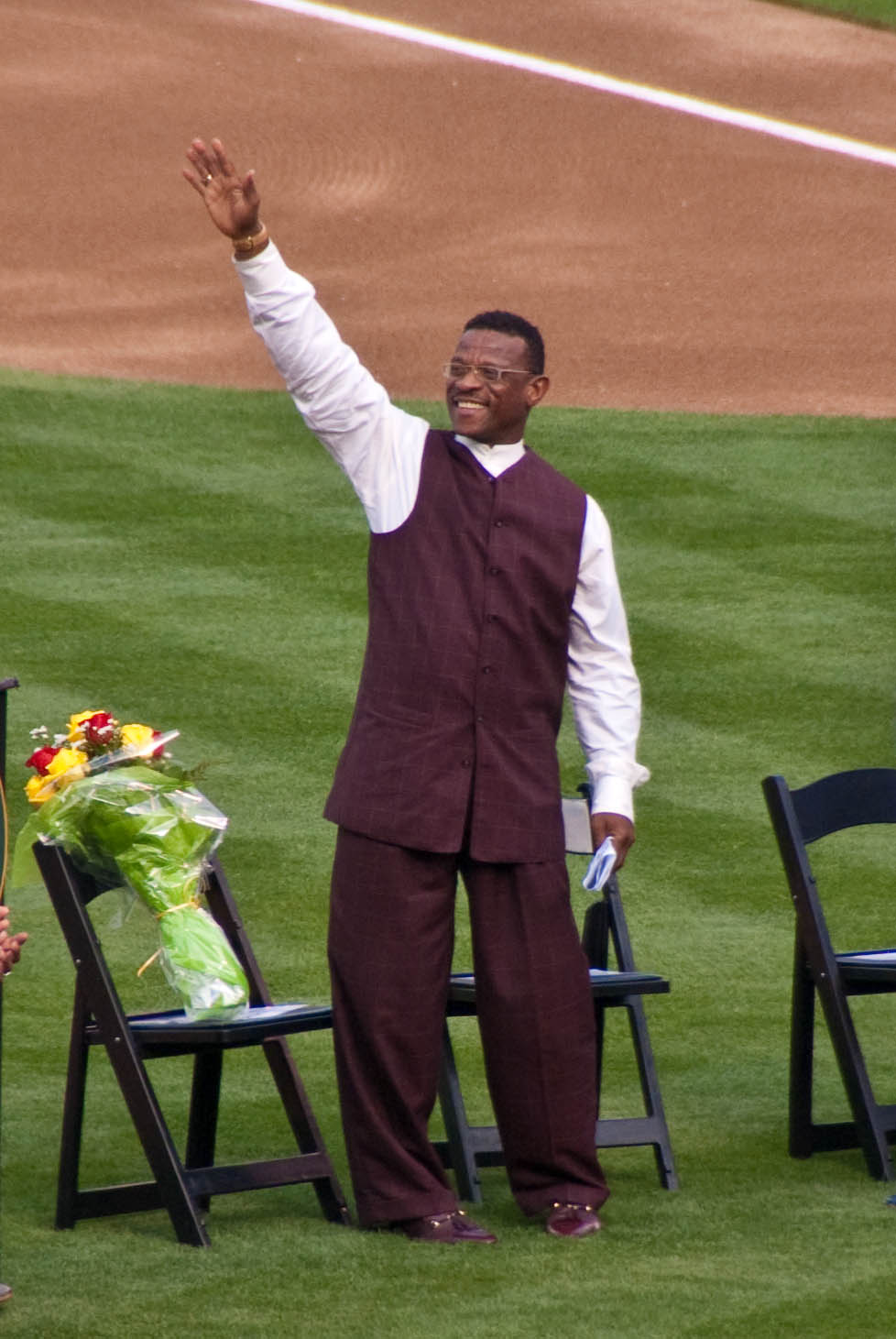
Rickey Henderson led off the game with a single, scored the game's first run, and hit a home run in the fifth inning.

October 4, 1999 7:05 pm (EDT) at Cinergy Field in Cincinnati, Ohio 46 °F (8 °C), Overcast
Team	1	2	3	4	5	6	7	8	9	R	H	E
New York	2	0	1	0	1	1	0	0	0	5	9	0
Cincinnati	0	0	0	0	0	0	0	0	0	0	2	0
WP: Al Leiter (13–12) LP: Steve Parris (11–4); Home runs: NYM: Edgardo Alfonzo (27), Rickey Henderson (12); CIN: None; Attendance: 54,621

The Mets took a quick 2–0 lead with a single by Rickey Henderson to open the game followed immediately by a home run by Edgardo Alfonzo. They added to this lead in the third as Alfonzo drew a walk and then John Olerud hit a double which advanced Alfonzo to third base. Reds starter Steve Parris intentionally walked Mike Piazza to load the bases and was relieved by Denny Neagle. However, Neagle then walked Robin Ventura to score Alfonzo and extend the lead to 3–0. Neagle remained in the game and yielded a home run to Henderson to lead off the fifth inning for the fourth run. Neagle then loaded the bases with two outs with walks to Piazza and Ventura followed by a Darryl Hamilton single, but escaped the inning without further scoring. The Reds pinch hit for Neagle in the bottom of the fifth, and Danny Graves entered for them to pitch the sixth inning. Graves walked Rey Ordóñez to leadoff the inning, Mets starter Al Leiter sacrifice bunted Ordóñez to second, and following an out he scored on a double by Alfonzo. Graves remained in the game until Mark Lewis pinch hit for him in the eighth and Dennys Reyes relieved him in the ninth. Graves and Reyes held the score steady after the sixth but the Reds' offense did not score against Al Leiter and the Mets won the game, and with it the Wild Card, 5–0.

Al Leiter pitched a complete game shutout, scattering two hits and four walks across the nine inning start. This was Leiter's first complete game of the season. Pokey Reese was the only Reds player to reach scoring position for the entire game, doubling to lead off the bottom of the ninth inning and then advancing to third on a ground out. The Bergen Record labeled Leiter the Mets' "flag bearer", coming through in games such as this when the team needed him most. For example, Leiter had also defeated Greg Maddux in his previous start on September 29 to snap the Mets' seven-game losing streak. Leiter's earned run average in the second half of the 1999 season was 1.22 runs lower than in the first. Leiter's start earned an 86 game score, which tied for the 14th best total in the National League that season.

== Aftermath ==
New York's win clinched the team's fifth postseason berth in franchise history, their first since losing in the 1988 National League Championship Series. The playoff berth made the Mets the second team in MLB history to make the playoffs after being two games back of the leader with three games left to play in the season. The Mets defeated the Arizona Diamondbacks in the NLDS, 3 games to 1. This win advanced the Mets to the NLCS where they lost to the Atlanta Braves, 4 games to 2.

The Mets performance in the playoffs drew heavy television viewership, with the decisive game of the NLCS scoring the highest ratings for any League Championship Series broadcast since 1993. Overall the NLCS averaged 10.9 million viewers, 18% higher than the NLCS had drawn the year before. Variety writer Tom Bierbaum argued this was a good sign for the future of baseball because the Mets and Boston Red Sox had drawn younger viewers during their time in the postseason. Bierbaum believed that baseball needed fresh teams, not just the often-successful Yankees and Braves, to draw new audiences and grow viewership.

At 96–67, the Reds had the best record of any team that failed to make the postseason in the Wild Card Era that began in 1995.

In baseball statistics tie-breakers counted as regular season games, with all events in them added to regular season statistics. For example, Mike Piazza grounded into his 27th double play of the season in the ninth inning, adding to his league-leading total. Similarly, Leiter's performance advanced his position on several 1999 statistical leaderboards including shutouts and walks issued. Reese, Ventura, and Ordóñez won Rawlings Gold Glove Awards for the season while Piazza and Alfonzo won Silver Sluggers. Robin Ventura also finished sixth in the National League's Most Valuable Player voting, with Chipper Jones taking the award.

This game marked the only time the Reds were shut out between April 1999 and May 2001, a span of 349 games. After this game, the Reds would go the entire 2000 season without getting shut out, becoming only the second team in MLB history to do so (joining the 1932 New York Yankees). They would extend their streak of scoring a run in every game into the 2001 season for a total of 208 games, the third longest such streak in MLB history at the time (now the fourth-longest). Had this game not counted as a regular season game, the Reds would have scored a run in 348 straight games, which would have been the longest streak in MLB history.

The New York Yankees also made the playoffs in 1999, eventually advancing to the 1999 World Series where they swept the Braves. The 1999 season marked the first time both of the current New York City-based MLB teams, the Mets and Yankees qualified for the playoffs together in the same season. Prior to the Mets' elimination, Mike Lupica noted the possibility of a "Subway Series", a term for a World Series played between two New York-based teams. The 1956 World Series between the Yankees and then-Brooklyn Dodgers was the last such Series. Yankees pitcher David Cone told Lupica "I want a Subway Series, for selfish reasons. I want to play in one." Although the Mets failed to make the Series in 1999 the two met the following year in the 2000 World Series where the Yankees won, 4 games to 1. After their 2000 World Series appearance, the Mets did not make the playoffs again until 2006. Meanwhile, the Reds did not place in the top two of their division until 2010. Jack McKeon managed the Reds from 1998 to 2000 and was fired after the 2000 season when the team finished 10 games back of the division leading Cardinals.
