= Darryl Hamilton =

American baseball player and analyst (1964–2015)

- Outfielder
- Born: December 3, 1964; Baton Rouge, Louisiana, U.S.
- Died: June 21, 2015 (aged 50); Pearland, Texas, U.S.
- Batted: Left Threw: Right

MLB debut
- June 3, 1988, for the Milwaukee Brewers

Last MLB appearance
- June 28, 2001, for the New York Mets

MLB statistics
- Batting average: .291
- Home runs: 51
- Runs batted in: 454
- Stats at Baseball Reference

Teams
- Milwaukee Brewers (1988, 1990–1995); Texas Rangers (1996); San Francisco Giants (1997–1998); Colorado Rockies (1998–1999); New York Mets (1999–2001)

Career highlights and awards
- Milwaukee Brewers Wall of Honor
Medals
Representing United States
Men's baseball
Pan American Championship
Bronze medal – third place	1985 Caracas	Team

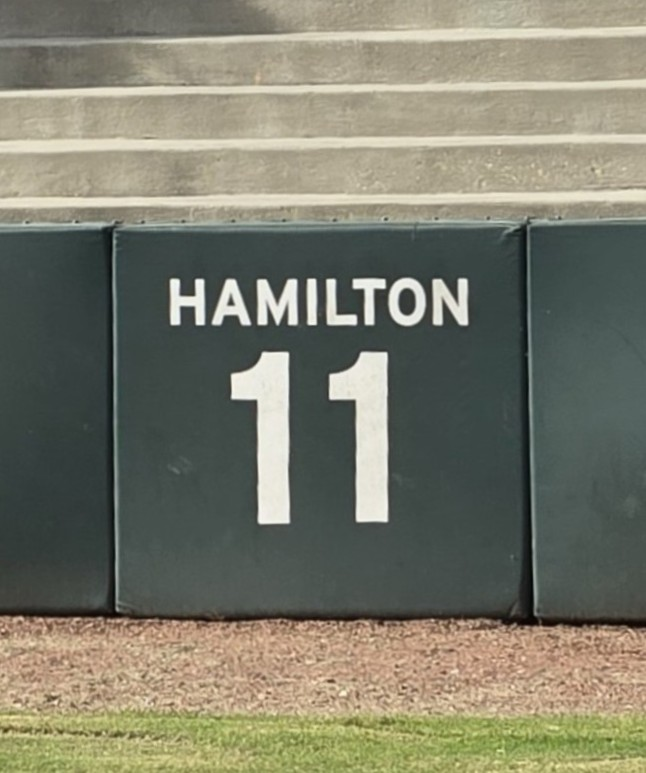
Darryl Hamilton, Nicholls Colonels

Darryl Quinn Hamilton (December 3, 1964 – June 21, 2015) was an American professional baseball outfielder who played in Major League Baseball (MLB) between 1988 and 2001 for the Milwaukee Brewers, Texas Rangers, San Francisco Giants, Colorado Rockies, and New York Mets. Hamilton prepped at Louisiana State University Laboratory School in Baton Rouge and then attended Nicholls State University in Thibodaux, Louisiana.

== Baseball career ==
=== Milwaukee Brewers ===
Hamilton was drafted by the Milwaukee Brewers in the 11th round of the 1986 Major League Baseball draft and signed a contract with them on June 12, 1986. He made his professional debut that season with the Helena Gold Sox of the Rookie-level Pioneer League, hitting .391 in 65 games. In 1987 with the Stockton Ports of the Class A California League, he hit .328 in 125 games with eight homers and 61 RBI, on a team that was rated one of the top farm teams in Brewers history. He began 1988 with the Denver Zephyrs of the Class AAA American Association, where he hit .325 in 72 games.

Hamilton made his MLB debut on June 3, 1988, as a defensive replacement for Robin Yount in the top of the seventh inning against the California Angels. Then, in his first at-bat, in the bottom of the inning, he singled to center field off Stew Cliburn of the Angels for his first major league hit. He hit his first home run off Bret Saberhagen of the Kansas City Royals on July 19, 1988. In 44 games with the Brewers during the second half of the 1988 season, Hamilton hit .184. His most notable moment that season was during his first start in left field, on September 3, he collided with shortstop Dale Sveum while chasing a blooper over third base. They collided with such force that Sveum's leg snapped, causing him to miss the rest of the season and all of the 1989 season and derailing his career. Hamilton avoided injury but spent the entire 1989 season back in the minors with the Zephyrs, where he hit .286 in 129 games.

In 1990, despite missing time with injuries, Hamilton played in 89 games and hit .295. He was awarded with the Brewers "Unsung Hero Award" in 1990 and the "Good Guy Award" in 1991 when he hit .311 in 122 games while still dealing with an assortment of injuries.

Hamilton stole 41 bases for the Brewers in 1992, while hitting .298 in 128 games. The Brewers as a team stole 256 bases, which was almost 100 more than the second place American League (AL) team.

In a game on August 28, 1992, at SkyDome, in Toronto, before a crowd of 50,408, the Brewers set an AL record by recording 31 hits in a single game in a 22–2 rout of the Toronto Blue Jays. Hamilton had four hits and five RBI in that game.

When long-time Brewer star Paul Molitor left via free agency before the 1993 season, Hamilton became more important to the Brewers offense. He had some more injuries this season, but Hamilton still led his team in batting average (.310), hits (161), singles (130) and stolen bases (21) and was awarded with the team's "Harvey Kuenn Award."

The Brewers decision to move Hamilton from right field into center field for the 1994 season contributed to Hall of Famer Robin Yount's decision to retire after the 1993 season.

In 1994, Hamilton played in only 36 games (hitting .262) before he was shut down for the season and underwent reconstructive elbow surgery. Despite missing most of the season, the Milwaukee chapter of the Baseball Writers Association voted him the recipient of the "Michael Harrison Award" for community service. Hamilton was also one of the Brewers player representatives during the leadup to the 1994–95 Major League Baseball strike.

In his final season as a member of the Brewers, in 1995, Hamilton played in 112 games and hit .271 with 11 stolen bases. In his seven seasons with the team, he had an overall .290 batting average in 666 games and hit 23 home runs, drove in 253 RBI and stole 109 bases. After the 1995 season, the Brewers declined Hamilton's $2.5 million contract option, making him a free agent. Hamilton filed a grievance against the Brewers, claiming he had been benched in the final weeks of the season in order to keep him from reaching 550 plate appearances which would have automatically picked up the option. The grievance was resolved in an undisclosed negotiated settlement.

=== Texas Rangers ===
Hamilton signed with the Texas Rangers on a one-year, $1.3 million, contract on December 14, 1995, for the 1996 season. He was critical of the Brewers when he signed with the Rangers, saying they were not interested in building a winning team. Hamilton played in a career best 148 games with the Rangers and was their regular starting center fielder. He hit .293 with six homers and 51 RBI and also stole 15 bases. He described his experience with the Rangers as "great." Hamilton did not make an error all season and led all center fielders in putouts as the Rangers put a premium on defense that season. The Rangers won the American League West division and the first playoff berth in franchise history. In the 1996 American League Division Series against the New York Yankees, Hamilton had three hits in 19 at-bats as the Rangers dropped the series three games to one.

=== San Francisco Giants ===
Hamilton signed a two-year contract with the San Francisco Giants on January 10, 1997. On June 12, he got the first hit in the first-ever regular-season interleague game, when the Giants defeated the Rangers 4–3. In 125 games, Hamilton had a .270 batting average, five homers, 43 RBI and 15 stolen bases. In the 1997 National League Division Series, Hamilton was hitless in five at-bats as the Giants were swept in three games by the eventual World Series champion Florida Marlins. He followed that up by playing in 97 games for the Giants in 1998 and hitting .294.

=== Colorado Rockies ===
The Giants traded Hamilton and Jim Stoops to the Colorado Rockies for Ellis Burks on July 31, 1998. Hamilton was surprised by the trade, wanting to complete his contract in San Francisco. In 51 games he hit .335. He re-signed with the Rockies after the 1998 season for one year and $3.6 million and played in 91 games in the 1999 season with an OBP of .374 for them.

=== New York Mets ===
Hamilton was traded to the New York Mets with Chuck McElroy for Rigo Beltrán, Brian McRae, and Thomas Johns on July 31, 1999. He played with the Mets through the 2001 season. In his three seasons with them he played in 150 games and hit .283. Hamilton and the Mets played in the post-season in both 1999 and 2000. In 1999, the Mets made the playoffs as a result of winning a one game playoff against the Cincinnati Reds. Once in, they defeated the Arizona Diamondbacks in the 1999 National League Division Series before losing to the Atlanta Braves in six games in the National League Championship Series. Hamilton had six hits in 17 at-bats in that series.

In 2000, the Mets defeated the San Francisco Giants in four games in the 2000 National League Division Series and the St. Louis Cardinals in five games in the 2000 National League Championship Series. Hamilton was a part-time player in the series, with only five at-bats in the division series and two in the championship series. In the 2000 World Series against the New York Yankees was hitless in three at-bats with two strikeouts as the Yankees won the series in five games. Hamilton was disappointed with his playing time during the playoffs and had a meeting with manager Bobby Valentine during spring training the following year to discuss his reduced playing time. Things did not improve for him and he asked for his release at the end of June, and it was granted on July 11, 2001. He signed a minor league contract with the Rockies a week later, but was released on July 25 after four games with the Colorado Springs Sky Sox. He retired at the end of the 2001 season.

Over his 13-year career, Hamilton batted .291, with 51 home runs and 454 RBI in 1,328 games. As an outfielder, he collected 2,711 putouts and 45 assists, committing only 14 errors in 2,770 total chances, for a .995 fielding percentage.

== Broadcasting career ==
Hamilton worked for MLB Advanced Media from 2003 to 2006 and also worked for NBC Sports Network's Sports Talk and KPRC-TV in Houston. Also in Texas, Hamilton lent his voice to KFNC and KGOW. At the conclusion of the 2006 baseball postseason, Hamilton began working in the Major League Baseball Commissioner's Office of On-Field Operations, reporting to Vice President Bob Watson.

In 2012, Hamilton was named as a color analyst for a limited series of Los Angeles Angels of Anaheim games to be broadcast nationally by Compass Media Networks radio. In 2013, he joined the MLB Network as an on-air analyst. In 2014, Hamilton served as a part-time color analyst on Brewers radio broadcasts, rotating with Craig Counsell and Jerry Augustine to call games with Joe Block when primary announcer Bob Uecker was absent.

== Personal life ==
Hamilton was married in 1994 to Access Hollywood anchor Shaun Robinson; they later divorced. Hamilton married fashion model Ursaline Steinke in 2000, with whom he had two sons, Donovan and Julian.

At the time of his death, Hamilton was living in an affluent neighborhood in suburban Houston, Texas, in a house belonging to his girlfriend, Monica Jordan. Jordan, a graduate of Florida State University and University of Houston Law Center, was an attorney who had been employed by Enron and Halliburton. The couple had a son together in 2014.

== Death ==
Around 4:45 p.m. on June 21, 2015, Hamilton, 50, and his ex-girlfriend, Monica Jordan, 44, were found dead in their Pearland, Texas, house, in what appeared to be a murder–suicide. Investigators said it appeared Hamilton had been shot more than once and Jordan died from a self-inflicted gunshot wound. Hamilton and Jordan's 14 month-old child was found alive by police in the home and taken into the custody of Texas Child Protective Services. According to Pearland police, there did not appear to have been a struggle and the incident "occurred just inside the front door." A third party called 9-1-1.

According to Brazoria County District Attorney Jeri Yenne, Jordan previously pleaded guilty to felony arson in 2008 arising from a 2006 incident in which she burned down the house in which she had been living with her then-husband Rohaven Richards. Jordan allegedly had suspected Richards of cheating on her and chased him around the house while trying to douse him in gasoline.

Hamilton's remains are interred in Southern Memorial Gardens in Baton Rouge.
