= 1999 Cincinnati Reds season =

1999 Cincinnati Reds
- League: National League
- Division: Central
- Ballpark: Cinergy Field
- City: Cincinnati
- Record: 96–67 (.589)
- Divisional place: 2nd
- Owners: Marge Schott, Carl Lindner
- General managers: Jim Bowden
- Managers: Jack McKeon
- Television: Fox Sports Ohio (George Grande, Chris Welsh)
- Radio: WLW (Marty Brennaman, Joe Nuxhall)
- Stats: ESPN.com; Baseball Reference

The 1999 Cincinnati Reds season was the 130th season for the franchise in Major League Baseball. During the season the Reds became a surprising contender in the National League Central, winning 96 games and narrowly losing the division to the Houston Astros, ultimately missing the playoffs after losing a tie-breaker game to the New York Mets. As of 2023, the 1999 Reds currently hold the Major League record for the most wins by a team that failed to reach the playoffs in the Wild Card era. It was the final season with Marge Schott as owner, as she agreed in April to sell most of her shares of the team that was approved on September 15.

== Offseason ==
- November 5, 1998: Melvin Nieves was released by the Cincinnati Reds.
- November 10, 1998: Bret Boone was traded by the Cincinnati Reds with Mike Remlinger to the Atlanta Braves for Rob Bell, Denny Neagle, and Michael Tucker.
- November 11, 1998: Paul Konerko was traded by the Cincinnati Reds to the Chicago White Sox for Mike Cameron.
- December 21, 1998: Steve Avery was signed as a free agent with the Cincinnati Reds.
- February 2, 1999: Mark Sweeney was traded by the San Diego Padres with Greg Vaughn to the Cincinnati Reds for Damian Jackson, Reggie Sanders, and Josh Harris (minors).

== Regular season ==
=== Opening Day starters ===
Pos	Player
CF	Mike Cameron
SS	Barry Larkin
1B	Sean Casey
LF	Greg Vaughn
RF	Dmitri Young
C	Eddie Taubensee
3B	Aaron Boone
2B	Pokey Reese
P	Brett Tomko

=== Summary ===
In the May 19 contest versus the Colorado Rockies, the Reds won by a 24−12 final, tied for the fourth-highest run-scoring output in MLB history. The Reds' Jeffrey Hammonds hit three home runs this game; following the season, Colorado acquired him via trade. Both Hammonds and Sean Casey totaled four hits. Casey was on base seven times with three walks, and hit two home runs and six RBI. The Reds totaled six home runs; Casey added two, and Brian Johnson one. Colorado's Larry Walker and Dante Bichette both had four hits. Bichette also had five RBI, and Vinny Castilla hit a three-run home run.

=== Season standings ===
NL Central
Team	W	L	Pct.	GB	Home	Road
Houston Astros	97	65	.599	—	50‍–‍32	47‍–‍33
Cincinnati Reds	96	67	.589	1½	45‍–‍37	51‍–‍30
Pittsburgh Pirates	78	83	.484	18½	45‍–‍36	33‍–‍47
St. Louis Cardinals	75	86	.466	21½	38‍–‍42	37‍–‍44
Milwaukee Brewers	74	87	.460	22½	32‍–‍48	42‍–‍39
Chicago Cubs	67	95	.414	30	34‍–‍47	33‍–‍48

=== Record vs. opponents ===
1999 National League record Source: MLB Standings Grid – 1999
Team	AZ	ATL	CHC	CIN	COL	FLA	HOU	LAD	MIL	MON	NYM	PHI	PIT	SD	SF	STL	AL
Arizona	—	4–5	7–2	1–8	6–7	8–1	5–4	7–6	5–4	6–3	7–2	8–1	5–2	11–2	9–3	4–4	7–8
Atlanta	5–4	—	2–5	8–1	5–4	9–4	6–1	5–4	5–2	9–4	9–3	8–5	6–3	5–4	4–5	8–1	9–9
Chicago	2–7	5–2	—	5–8	4–5	6–3	3–9	2–7	6–6	2–5	3–6	2–7	7–6	6–3	1–7	7–5	6–9
Cincinnati	8–1	1–8	8–5	—	7–2	6–1	9–4	4–3	6–6	4–3	5–5	6–3	7–6	6–3	4–5	8–4	7–8
Colorado	7–6	4–5	5–4	2–7	—	5–4	2–6	8–5	6–3	6–3	4–5	5–4	2–7	4–9	4–9	4–5	4–8
Florida	1–8	4–9	3–6	1–6	4–5	—	2–7	7–2	5–4	8–4	3–10	2–11	3–4	3–6	4–5	3–4	11–7
Houston	4–5	1–6	9–3	4–9	6–2	7–2	—	6–3	8–5	7–2	4–5	6–1	5–7	8–1	5–4	5–7	12–3
Los Angeles	6–7	4–5	7–2	3–4	5–8	2–7	3–6	—	7–2	5–4	4–4	6–3	3–6	3–9	8–5	3–6	8–7
Milwaukee	4–5	2–5	6–6	6–6	3–6	4–5	5–8	2–7	—	5–4	2–5	5–4	8–4	3–5	4–5	7–6	8–6
Montreal	3–6	4–9	5–2	3–4	3–6	4–8	2–7	4–5	4–5	—	5–8	6–6	3–6	5–3	4–5	5–4	8–10
New York	2–7	3–9	6–3	5–5	5–4	10–3	5–4	4–4	5–2	8–5	—	6–6	7–2	7–2	7–2	5–2	12–6
Philadelphia	1–8	5–8	7–2	3–6	4–5	11–2	1–6	3–6	4–5	6–6	6–6	—	3–4	6–3	2–6	4–5	11–7
Pittsburgh	2–5	3–6	6–7	6–7	7–2	4–3	7–5	6–3	4–8	6–3	2–7	4–3	—	3–6	4–5	7–5	7–8
San Diego	2–11	4–5	3–6	3–6	9–4	6–3	1–8	9–3	5–3	3–5	2–7	3–6	6–3	—	5–7	2–7	11–4
San Francisco	3–9	5–4	7–1	5–4	9–4	5–4	4–5	5–8	5–4	5–4	2–7	6–2	5–4	7–5	—	6–3	7–8
St. Louis	4–4	1–8	5–7	4–8	5–4	4–3	7–5	6–3	6–7	4–5	2–5	5–4	5–7	7–2	3–6	—	7–8

=== Transactions ===
- June 2, 1999: Ben Broussard was drafted by the Cincinnati Reds in the 2nd round of the 1999 amateur draft. Player signed June 2, 1999.
- August 4, 1999: Jason Bere was released by the Cincinnati Reds.

=== Roster ===
1999 Cincinnati Reds
Roster
Pitchers: 33 Steve Avery; 37 Stan Belinda; 46 Jason Bere; 32 Danny Graves; 57 Rick Greene; 57 Juan Guzmán; 38 Pete Harnisch; 26 John Hudek; 15 Denny Neagle; 58 Steve Parris; 49 Dennys Reyes; 43 B. J. Ryan; 56 Scott Sullivan; 40 Brett Tomko; 41 Ron Villone; 36 Gabe White; 48 Scott Williamson	Catchers: 29 Brian Johnson; 26 Jason LaRue; 10 Eddie Taubensee; Infielders: 17 Aaron Boone; 21 Sean Casey; 6 Gookie Dawkins; 11 Barry Larkin; 28 Mark Lewis; 9 Hal Morris; 3 Pokey Reese; 12 Chris Stynes; 7 Mark Sweeney	Outfielders: 44 Mike Cameron; 4 Jeffrey Hammonds; 00 Kerry Robinson; 34 Michael Tucker; 23 Greg Vaughn; 25 Dmitri Young	Manager: 31 Jack McKeon; Coaches: 2 Harry Dunlop (assistant); 30 Ken Griffey, Sr. (hitting); 35 Don Gullett (pitching); 47 Tom Hume (bullpen); 19 Denis Menke (bench); 16 Ron Oester (third base); 22 Dave Collins (first base)

== Player stats ==
=== Batting ===
==== Starters by position ====
Note: Pos = Position; G = Games played; AB = At bats; H = Hits; Avg. = Batting average; HR = Home runs; RBI = Runs batted in

Pos	Player	G	AB	H	Avg.	HR	RBI
C	Eddie Taubensee	126	424	132	.311	21	87
1B	Sean Casey	151	594	197	.332	25	99
2B	Pokey Reese	149	585	167	.285	10	52
3B	Aaron Boone	139	472	132	.280	14	72
SS	Barry Larkin	161	583	171	.293	12	75
LF	Greg Vaughn	153	550	135	.245	45	118
CF	Mike Cameron	146	542	139	.256	21	66
RF	Michael Tucker	133	296	75	.253	11	44

==== Other batters ====
Note: Pos = Position; G = Games played; AB = At bats; H = Hits; Avg. = Batting average; HR = Home runs; RBI = Runs batted in

Pos	Player	G	AB	H	Avg.	HR	RBI
OF	Dmitri Young	127	373	112	.300	14	56
OF	Jeffrey Hammonds	123	262	73	.279	17	41
3B	Mark Lewis	88	173	44	.254	6	28
C	Brian Johnson	45	117	27	.231	5	18
IF	Chris Stynes	73	113	27	.239	2	14
1B	Hal Morris	80	102	29	.284	0	16
C	Jason LaRue	36	90	19	.211	3	10
1B	Mark Sweeney	37	31	11	.355	2	7
SS	Travis Dawkins	7	7	1	.143	0	0
LF	Kerry Robinson	9	1	0	.000	0	0

=== Starting pitchers ===
Note: G = Games pitched; GS = Games started; IP = Innings pitched; W= Wins; L = Losses; K = Strikeouts; ERA = Earned run average; WHIP = Walks + Hits Per Inning Pitched

Player	G	GS	IP	W	L	K	ERA	WHIP
Harnisch, Pete	33	33	198.1	16	10	120	3.68	1.24
Tomko, Brett	33	26	172.0	5	7	132	4.78	1.36
Villone, Ron	29	22	142.2	9	7	97	4.23	1.31
Parris, Steve	22	21	128.2	11	4	86	3.50	1.36
Neagle, Denny	20	19	111.2	9	5	76	4.27	1.20
Avery, Steve	19	19	96.0	6	7	51	5.16	1.59
Guzmán, Juan	12	12	77.1	6	3	60	3.03	1.18

==== Other pitchers ====
Note: G = Games pitched; GS = Games started; IP = Innings pitched; W = Wins; L = Losses; ERA = Earned run average; SO = Strikeouts

Player	G	GS	IP	W	L	ERA	SO
Bere, Jason	12	10	43.1	3	0	6.85	28

==== Relief pitchers ====
Note: G = Games pitched; W = Wins; L = Losses; SV = Saves; ERA = Earned run average; SO = Strikeouts

Player	G	W	L	SV	ERA	SO
Graves, Danny	75	8	7	27	3.08	69
Sullivan, Scott	79	5	4	3	3.01	78
Williamson, Scott	62	12	7	19	2.41	107
Reyes, Dennys	65	2	2	2	3.79	72
White, Gabe	50	1	2	0	4.43	61
Belinda, Stan	29	0	3	1	5.27	40
Greene, Rick	1	0	0	0	4.76	3
Ryan, B.J.	1	0	0	0	4.50	1
Hudek, John	2	0	0	1	27.00	0

== Awards and honors ==
- Scott Williamson, National League Rookie of the Year
- Sean Casey, Hutch Award
- Jack McKeon, National League Manager of the Year

=== Legacy ===
The 96 wins by the 1999 Cincinnati Reds were the most since the 1976 Big Red Machine who compiled 102 victories en route to their second consecutive World Series title. The Reds would not reach the 90-win plateau again until the 2010 season, when the team won the National League Central title with 91 victories.

The 1999 team is regarded as one of the best teams not to make the playoffs. Since the switch to 162 game season in 1962, the Reds have the sixth-best record, only to not make the playoffs at 96-67.

=== Notable Records ===
The team scored 865 runs, which still stands as the franchise record for runs scored in a season. The team also set franchise highs in most runs batted in (820), most total bases (2,549), and highest slugging percentage (.451)

On May 19, 1999, the Reds set three franchise records when they collected 28 hits, 15 extra base hits, and 55 total bases in a 24–12 victory over the Colorado Rockies. Sean Casey and Jeffrey Hammonds also set individual franchise records with each scoring five runs.

On September 4, 1999, the Reds set a franchise record when they clubbed nine home runs in a 22–3 victory over the Philadelphia Phillies. Eight different Reds players homered in the game, the only time since 1901 that a team has achieved this.

== Farm system ==
Level	Team	League	Manager
AAA	Indianapolis Indians	International League	Dave Miley
AA	Chattanooga Lookouts	Southern League	Phillip Wellman
A	Clinton LumberKings	Midwest League	Freddie Benavides
A	Rockford Reds	Midwest League	Mike Rojas
Rookie	GCL Reds	Gulf Coast League	Donnie Scott
Rookie	Billings Mustangs	Pioneer League	Russ Nixon
