= Kerry Robinson =

American baseball player (born 1973)

- Outfielder
- Born: October 3, 1973 (age 52); St. Louis, Missouri, U.S.
- Batted: Left Threw: Left

MLB debut
- September 22, 1998, for the Tampa Bay Devil Rays

Last MLB appearance
- June 17, 2006, for the Kansas City Royals

MLB statistics
- Batting average: .267
- Home runs: 3
- Runs batted in: 56
- Stats at Baseball Reference

Teams
- Tampa Bay Devil Rays (1998); Cincinnati Reds (1999); St. Louis Cardinals (2001–2003); San Diego Padres (2004); Kansas City Royals (2006)

Kerry Keith Robinson (born October 3, 1973) is an American former professional Major League Baseball player.

== Early life and amateur career ==
Robinson started at an early age playing baseball and football for N.Y.A. (Northside Youth Association) and playing ice hockey for the Valley Stars in St. Louis, Missouri. Robinson graduated from Hazelwood East High School and was a two-sport star with brief playing time on the 1989 Missouri State 5A Championship team (ranked #2 nationally) and holds the highest career batting average (.517) in school history, and also for goals scored in a season (29) on the ice hockey team. He went on to walk-on and play baseball at Southeast Missouri State University, where in his senior season, he had an Ohio Valley Conference record 35-game hitting streak that at the time was the 13th longest in NCAA history.

== Professional baseball career ==
Robinson was originally drafted by the St. Louis Cardinals in 1995. In 1996, he led the Midwest League with a .359 batting average and 50 stolen bases (a tie) and was second in the league in hits, triples, and runs while playing for Single-A Peoria. His professional playing career lasted 12 years between the big leagues and minors. During his time in the minor leagues, Robinson tallied 322 stolen bases.

Robinson pinch hit for Mark McGwire in the 8th inning of the last game of McGwire's career, Game 5 of the 2001 National League Division Series. He is the only player in MLB history to wear both the numbers 00 (for the 1999 Cincinnati Reds) and 0 (for the 2002–2003 St. Louis Cardinals) at some point in a career. He is also known from the book Three Nights in August where he delivered a game-winning, walk-off home run off Chicago Cubs' relief pitcher Mike Remlinger.

== Career after baseball ==
His playing career ended in 2007, and he initially became a financial advisor. In November 2018, the Cardinals announced the comeback of the powder “victory” blue jerseys; this was Robinson's brain child and he played an integral role in convincing Cardinals president Bill DeWitt III to adopt the uniforms.

Robinson served as a professional scout for the Cardinals in Ballwin, Missouri.

In July 2023, Missouri Governor Mike Parson appointed Robinson to the Southeast Missouri State University board of governors. In September 2023, Robinson was sworn in by Stephen N. Limbaugh Jr., Senior Judge of the United States District Court for the Eastern District of Missouri.
