= Armando Benítez =

Dominican baseball player (born 1972)

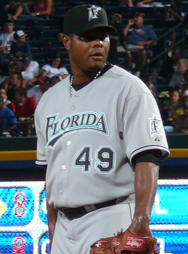
- Benítez with the Marlins in June 2007
- Pitcher
- Born: November 3, 1972 (age 54); Ramón Santana, Dominican Republic
- Batted: Right Threw: Right

MLB debut
- July 28, 1994, for the Baltimore Orioles

Last MLB appearance
- June 6, 2008, for the Toronto Blue Jays

MLB statistics
- Win–loss record: 40–47
- Earned run average: 3.13
- Strikeouts: 946
- Saves: 289
- Stats at Baseball Reference

Teams
- Baltimore Orioles (1994–1998); New York Mets (1999–2003); New York Yankees (2003); Seattle Mariners (2003); Florida Marlins (2004); San Francisco Giants (2005–2007); Florida Marlins (2007); Toronto Blue Jays (2008)

Career highlights and awards
- 2× All-Star (2003, 2004); NL Rolaids Relief Man Award (2001); NL saves leader (2004)

Armando Germán Benítez (born November 3, 1972) is a Dominican former major league relief pitcher. Benítez debuted with the Baltimore Orioles in 1994 and within a few years became their closer. He was a reliever for several other organizations after Baltimore in 1999 and last played in Major League Baseball in 2008. His 289 saves rank 32nd all time. After 2008, he played in minor league and independent league baseball.

== Early life ==
Armando Germán Benítez was born in San Pedro de Macorís, in the Dominican Republic. His parents, father Francisco and mother Constancia, separated when he was young, so Armando was raised by his mother. She made a living by hand-washing clothes. Armando has two brothers, Francisco Jr. and Osiri, as well as a sister, Senovia.

Benítez learned to play baseball when he was 14, when his stature was a lanky 6'2", 140 pounds. He began to play baseball at a local academy and was originally an outfielder and third baseman.

== Professional career ==
=== Baltimore Orioles ===
Benítez was signed in 1990 by the Baltimore Orioles as a free agent. Coming up through the Orioles' farm system, he made his debut in 1994. While with the Orioles, he initially struggled, collecting a 5.66 ERA in 1995 and faltering in the postseason frequently. In the 1996 ALCS, he yielded the infamous Jeffrey Maier home run, sprinting all the way to right field to confront the umpire, Rich Garcia, who made the call.

In 1997, Benítez had a breakout year, as he excelled in the set up role for Orioles' closer Randy Myers, forming a lethal 1–2 punch at the back end of the Orioles bullpen and propelling them to the AL East pennant. However, in the 1997 ALCS against Cleveland, Benitez had one of the least successful postseason series ever by a relief pitcher. The Orioles lost four games by a single run: in three of them, Benitez was on the mound for the final run of the game, while pitching one inning or less. He was charged with two losses and a blown save.

By 1998, he started to show some of his future potential earning a 3.82 ERA and 22 saves in 71 games.

However, during a game against the New York Yankees on May 19, 1998, Benítez was ejected for hitting Tino Martinez with a pitch that led to a brawl between the two teams. Although Benítez denied hitting Martinez intentionally, few Orioles defended his actions and he was assessed an eight-game suspension by American League President Gene Budig, and his own manager even apologized to the Yankees for Benitez's behavior. It was the second time he had drilled Martinez, which caused Martinez's incensed reaction. He did the same thing three years before when Martinez was playing for the Seattle Mariners after surrendering an Edgar Martínez grand slam, which had led to his demotion to the minors at that time.

=== New York Mets ===
Before the 1999 season, Benítez was traded to the New York Mets in a three-team deal, in which catcher Charles Johnson joined the Orioles while Todd Hundley was sent to the Los Angeles Dodgers, with Roger Cedeño also joining Benitez in New York. Benitez initially served as the setup man for longtime Mets closer John Franco; however, when Franco went down with an injury mid-way through the 1999 season, Benitez assumed the job and was named the full-time Mets closer even after Franco's return. However, he continued his late season and postseason struggles. In Game 4 of the 1999 NL Division Series, after notoriously arriving late to the ballpark in Game 4, he was called upon to protect a 2–1 lead in the eighth inning against the expansion Arizona Diamondbacks, but allowed a two-run double as the Diamondbacks went ahead. He also blew a three-run lead in Game 2 of the 2000 NL Division Series against the San Francisco Giants, surrendering a game tying three run homer to JT Snow. He would also surrender the lead in Game 1 of the 2000 World Series to the New York Yankees, as the Yankees would eventually prevail in a marathon extra-inning game, ultimately winning the series in five games. Despite these struggles during his four seasons in New York, he managed to establish himself as one of the Major Leagues' better closers, saving 139 games. But it was also a painful time for Benítez, who battled gout during the 2000 season, due to overindulging in shellfish. However, as Benítez still struggled to hold leads when it seemed to matter most, to many fans his failures in clutch situations overshadowed most of the success he had in his career in New York. Regardless, several playoff contenders were interested in his services. Midway through 2003, as Benítez labored trying to convert saves through the year, he was traded to the New York Yankees, who intended to use him as a setup man for Mariano Rivera.

=== New York Yankees, Seattle Mariners, and Florida Marlins ===
Benítez had a 1.93 ERA, but allowed 14 baserunners in 9 1/3 innings over nine games with the Yankees before being traded in a post-deadline waiver deal to the Seattle Mariners for Jeff Nelson. Benitez finished the 2003 season in Seattle. In 2004, Benítez once again became a closer, signing a one-year, $3.5 million contract to join the Florida Marlins. His season with the Marlins ended up being his best season to date; he saved 47 games in 51 chances and compiled a 1.29 ERA. In fact, after giving up a solo home run in his first game of the season, he did not allow another earned run until June 5, an impressive streak of 30 scoreless innings. After the season, Benítez elected to become a free agent, signing a three-year contract with the San Francisco Giants that was worth a reported US$21 million.

=== San Francisco Giants ===
His tenure with the Giants was mired by injuries and a high percentage of blown saves, never recapturing the form he showed in 2004 with the Marlins. His first season with the Giants started badly when Benítez tore a pair of tendons in his right hamstring while running to cover first in late April. The injury had him sidelined until August, when he returned to the mound after a difficult rehab.

Benítez struggled for much of the 2006 season, at one point blowing three consecutive save opportunities. Benítez's season ended prematurely after being placed on the 60-day disabled list with arthritis in both knees. He ended the season with 17 saves in 25 opportunities.

Benítez started 2007 well, converting all of his first seven save opportunities. However, in May, Benítez picked up two blown saves and three losses, including a blown save and a loss against his former team, the Mets, where he committed two balks. This game immediately brought back memories of his various meltdowns on the mound as a Met, and the media pounced on it. After the game Benítez commented, "I didn't do my job", contrasting with his previous game where he picked up the loss yet claimed, "I did my job." MLB.com writer Chris Haft reported that this added "little to the family atmosphere" at the Giants ballclub. Benítez had once before said, "I did my job", even when tallying a blown save, during a Giants loss to the Nationals in 2006.

On May 31, 2007, he was traded back to the Florida Marlins in exchange for Randy Messenger. Giants general manager Brian Sabean acknowledged that Benítez was not liked by the Giants fanbase, saying he had become a "whipping boy", adding "the fans, the press and maybe some people in the clubhouse felt he needed to go". Chris Haft noted that Benítez had "incurred the wrath of San Francisco fans with his perceived attitude as well as his performance", further writing "he maintained his tendency to shrug off accountability for poor performances, prompting the crowds at AT&T Park to boo him after the slightest lapse."

=== Return to the Marlins, then to the Toronto Blue Jays ===
Benítez's first return to AT&T Park after being traded to the Marlins came on July 29, 2007. He was greeted with "thunderous boos" from the Giants fans.

On October 29, 2007, Benítez officially filed for free agency, ending his second tenure with the Marlins following a disappointing campaign where he posted a 5.36 ERA between the two teams and did not record a save following the trade.

On March 11, 2008, Benítez agreed to a minor league deal with the Toronto Blue Jays and was given chance to compete for a bullpen job in spring training. After starting the season in the minors, he was eventually added to the active roster in May. However, after posting a 5.68 ERA, he was designated for assignment on June 7 and released.

=== Later career ===
Benitez started the 2009 season with the Newark Bears, an Independent League team in the Atlantic League, before signing a minor league contract with the Houston Astros on August 22, and was assigned to their Triple-A affiliate the Round Rock Express. On his minor league return, Benitez gave up back-to-back-to-back-to-back home runs against Memphis Redbirds hitters.

On June 24, 2010, Benitez signed a minor league deal with the Florida Marlins and was assigned to their Triple-A affiliate, New Orleans Zephyrs. Benitez was released on July 15 and immediately signed to play his second stint with the Newark Bears. Following the season, he became a free agent. In May 2011, Armando signed to play for the Bridgeport Bluefish of the Atlantic League of Independent Baseball. On May 24, 2012, Benitez signed with the Atlantic League's Long Island Ducks.

== Accomplishments ==
- Two-time All-Star (2003–04)
- National League Rolaids Relief Man of the Year Award (2001)
- #32 all-time in Saves (289)

== See also ==
- List of Major League Baseball annual saves leaders
