= Todd Hundley =

American baseball player (born 1969)

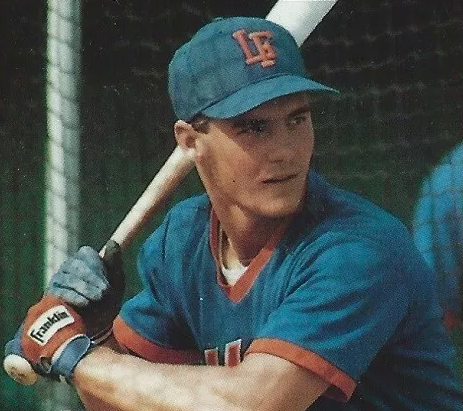
- Hundley with the Little Falls Mets c. 1988
- Catcher
- Born: May 27, 1969 (age 57); Martinsville, Virginia, U.S.
- Batted: Switch Threw: Right

MLB debut
- May 18, 1990, for the New York Mets

Last MLB appearance
- September 27, 2003, for the Los Angeles Dodgers

MLB statistics
- Batting average: .234
- Home runs: 202
- Runs batted in: 599
- Stats at Baseball Reference

Teams
- New York Mets (1990–1998); Los Angeles Dodgers (1999–2000); Chicago Cubs (2001–2002); Los Angeles Dodgers (2003)

Career highlights and awards
- 2× All-Star (1996, 1997)

Todd Randolph Hundley (born May 27, 1969) is an American former Major League Baseball catcher and outfielder. He was a two-time All-Star who played for 14 seasons with the New York Mets, Los Angeles Dodgers, and Chicago Cubs.

== Early life ==
Hundley was born in Martinsville, Virginia, and grew up in Illinois, where his father, Randy, was a catcher for the Chicago Cubs. Hundley attended William Fremd High School in Palatine, Illinois, where he played on the school baseball and hockey teams. As a switch-hitting junior, he led his team in runs batted in and had a batting average of .357.

== Professional career ==
The Mets selected Hundley in the second round of the 1987 MLB draft with the 39th overall pick. He was selected as a compensation pick from the Baltimore Orioles for signing Ray Knight.

Hundley made his major league debut with the New York Mets on May 18, 1990, when he was 20 years old. He came up with great fanfare but did not hit very well in his first few years in the Major Leagues. Hundley described himself as overmatched early in his career.

After a few years and a few injuries, his hitting increasingly improved to match his defense. He began to break out in the strike-shortened 1994 season and that breakout continued into the following seasons. In 1996, Hundley hit 41 home runs, setting the Mets single-season home run record (previously set by Darryl Strawberry in 1988) and the single-season record for catchers (previously set by Roy Campanella in 1953). Carlos Beltrán subsequently tied the team record in 2006 and Pete Alonso broke it in 2019. Javy López broke the positional record in 2003 and Cal Raleigh broke it in 2025. Hundley was named to the National League All-Star team for the first time in 1996 and then again 1997. He also received votes for the Most Valuable Player Award in 1996.

The Mets' acquisition of perennial All-Star Mike Piazza in May 1998 combined with a career-threatening elbow injury brought his tenure with the Mets to a close. With Piazza on the roster, the Mets moved Hundley to left field where he had little success. He was traded to the Los Angeles Dodgers on December 1, 1998, in a three-team trade that brought Armando Benítez and Roger Cedeño to the Mets while also sending fellow catcher Charles Johnson to the Baltimore Orioles.

Rob Neyer later summarized the trajectory of Hundley's tenure with the Mets as "overmatched, dangerous, hurt, Piazza, gone."

While playing for the Dodgers in 2000, Hundley became the first visiting player to hit a home run into McCovey Cove at what was then Pacific Bell Park (now Oracle Park).

After two seasons in Los Angeles, Hundley signed with the Chicago Cubs for four years and $23.5 million in December 2000. Hundley spent two seasons in Chicago where he was both unproductive on the field and unpopular with fans.

Only two years into his contract, he was traded back to Los Angeles with Chad Hermansen for Eric Karros and Mark Grudzielanek before the 2003 season. His final season came in 2003. Despite not playing in 2004, he was paid $7 million.

In 2007, the Mitchell Report revealed that Mets clubhouse attendant Kirk Radomski told investigators he sold Deca-Durabolin to Hundley prior to his 1996 record-breaking season.

== Personal life ==
On January 6, 1990, Hundley married his high school sweetheart. In September 1998, Hundley and his wife, had four children. By August 2005, Hundley was divorced.

In August 2005, Hundley was arrested and charged in Lake County, Illinois, with driving under the influence and endangering the life and health of children after being pulled over in his Hummer H2 with his two daughters in the backseat and failing field sobriety tests. Hundley attributed his condition to the prescription painkiller Vicodin.

Hundley married his second wife on March 2, 2006, in White Sulphur Springs, West Virginia.

In May 2012, Hundley sold his six-bedroom Glenview, Illinois, home for $1.4 million, $200,000 less than his 2004 purchase price.

== See also ==
- List of second-generation Major League Baseball players
- List of Major League Baseball players named in the Mitchell Report
