= Roger Cedeño =

Venezuelan baseball player, coach, and charity founder (born 1974)

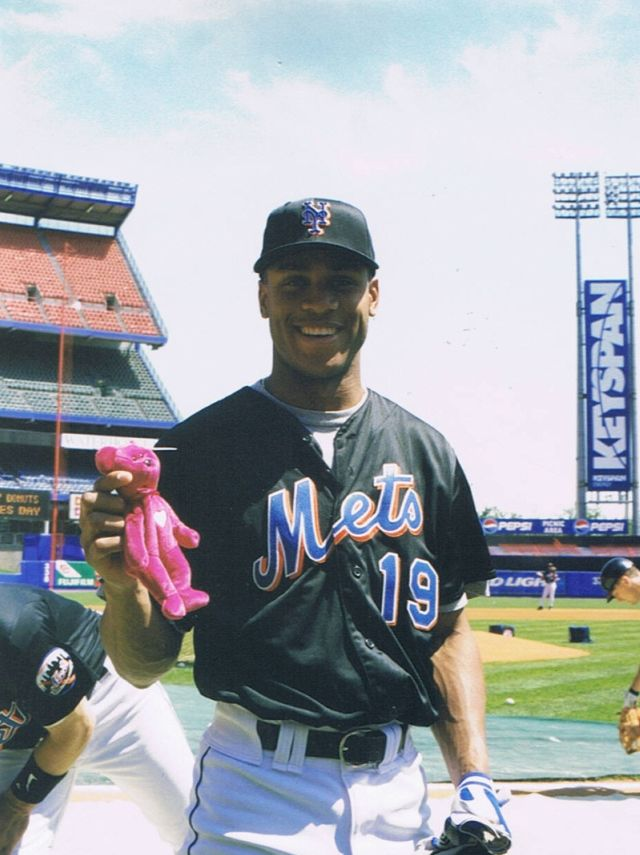
- Cedeño with the New York Mets
- Outfielder
- Born: August 16, 1974 (age 51); Valencia, Carabobo, Venezuela
- Batted: Switch Threw: Right

MLB debut
- June 20, 1995, for the Los Angeles Dodgers

Last MLB appearance
- June 5, 2005, for the St. Louis Cardinals

MLB statistics
- Batting average: .273
- Home runs: 40
- Runs batted in: 274
- Stolen bases: 213
- Stats at Baseball Reference

Teams
- Los Angeles Dodgers (1995–1998); New York Mets (1999); Houston Astros (2000); Detroit Tigers (2001); New York Mets (2002–2003); St. Louis Cardinals (2004–2005)

Roger Leandro Cedeño (born August 16, 1974) is a Venezuelan former professional baseball outfielder. He played 11 seasons in Major League Baseball (MLB) from 1995 to 2005 for the Los Angeles Dodgers, New York Mets, Houston Astros, Detroit Tigers, and St. Louis Cardinals.

== Career ==
Signed by the Los Angeles Dodgers as an undrafted amateur free agent in 1991, Cedeño made his major league debut in 1995. Cedeño was slated to be the heir apparent to veteran Dodger All-Star outfielder Brett Butler. However, after four seasons of mediocre play with the Dodgers, he was traded to the New York Mets on December 1, 1998 in a deal in which the Dodgers obtained Todd Hundley. In the 1999 season, Cedeño broke a Mets record by stealing 66 bases in a season (later broken by Jose Reyes). Besides his 66 stolen bases, Cedeño would bat .313, have an on-base percentage of .396, and a slugging percentage of .408. These would all turn out to be career bests. Following the season, on December 11 the Mets traded Cedeño to the Houston Astros as part of a deal to obtain Mike Hampton.

In May 2000, Cedeño broke his hand sliding headfirst into first base and would spend three months on the disabled list. Following the season, Cedeño would be involved in a December trade for the third consecutive year, this time going to the Detroit Tigers in a six player deal. 2001 would see Cedeño bat .293 and steal 55 bases, although he led the American League by being caught stealing 15 times. That winter would be the fourth year in a row he changed teams, returning to the Mets via free agency. The next three seasons would show further declines in Cedeño's stolen bases, 25 in 2002, 14 in 2003 and just 5 in 2004, while hitting in the .260s all three years. He was traded before the 2004 season to the St. Louis Cardinals for Wilson Delgado. Following a 2005 season that saw just 61 plate appearances, Cedeño was released by the Cardinals.

After a year off, Cedeño agreed to a minor league contract with the Baltimore Orioles in 2007. He was released on March 23, 2007.

Cedeño finished his career with a .273 batting average, 40 home runs, 274 RBI and 213 stolen bases in 1100 games.

== Causes ==
In 2016, Cedeno founded the Roger Cedeno Foundation in Aventura, Florida, an IRS designated 501 (c) (3) charitable organization Great Nonprofits Cedeno Foundation Profile and Fundacion Roger Cedeno in Venezuela to support organizations and programs to benefit youth and those most in need.

== Personal life ==
Cedeño's nephew, Yangervis Solarte, played infield for the San Francisco Giants. Cedeño convinced his agent to take Solarte on as a client as a personal favor.

== See also ==
- List of Major League Baseball career stolen bases leaders
- List of Major League Baseball players from Venezuela
