= Matt Franco =

American baseball player (born 1969)

- Utility player
- Born: August 19, 1969 (age 56); Santa Monica, California, U.S.
- Batted: Left Threw: Right

Professional debut
- MLB: September 6, 1995, for the Chicago Cubs
- NPB: March 27, 2004, for the Chiba Lotte Marines

Last appearance
- MLB: September 27, 2003, for the Atlanta Braves
- NPB: August 8, 2006, for the Chiba Lotte Marines

MLB statistics
- Batting average: .267
- Home runs: 22
- Runs batted in: 117

NPB statistics
- Batting average: .283
- Home runs: 44
- Runs batted in: 163
- Stats at Baseball Reference

Teams
- Chicago Cubs (1995); New York Mets (1996–2000); Atlanta Braves (2002–2003); Chiba Lotte Marines (2004–2006)

Matthew Neil Franco (born August 19, 1969) is an American former professional baseball player who played first base in the major leagues from 1995 to 2003, and in Nippon Professional Baseball from 2004 to 2006.

== Early career ==
Franco grew up in Westlake Village, California, playing youth soccer with future USMNT players Eric Wynalda and Cobi Jones. He was a standout baseball player at Westlake High and was drafted out of high school.

Franco started his professional career in 1987 with the Rookie League Wytheville Cubs in the Appalachian League. He started the 1988 season in short season rookie ball, again with the Wytheville Cubs. He hit .392 and was promoted to the Low Level A ball New York/Penn League. He played for the Winston-Salem Spirit of the Carolina League in 1991. Franco moved up to Double-A and for the next two seasons played for the Chicago Cubs Double-A affiliates in the Southern League, first with the Charlotte Knights in 1992, and then the Orlando Cubs in 1993.

Franco moved up to Triple-A in 1993. After starting the season in Orlando, he ended the season in Des Moines with the Iowa Cubs of the American Association. Franco would return to the Iowa Cubs the next season before breaking into the majors with the Chicago Cubs in 1995.

== Major leagues ==
On July 10, 1999, with the Mets trailing the Yankees by one run with two outs and two strikes in the bottom of the ninth, Franco came up with a pinch-hit single off of Mariano Rivera to score two runs and give the Mets a 9–8 win.

Franco held the major league record with 20 pinch hit walks in a season until Matt Joyce broke it in 2016.

== Alleged PED use ==
Kirk Radomski alleged that he sold Franco steroids in 2000. Franco told investigators that he had never bought or used any performance-enhancing substances, nor had he heard of Radomski until he pleaded guilty in federal court to money laundering and distributing steroids and human growth hormone.

== Personal life ==
He is the son of film producer Larry Franco, nephew of actor Kurt Russell, and grandson of actor Bing Russell.

== See also ==
- List of Major League Baseball players named in the Mitchell Report
