= Chuck McElroy =

American baseball player (born 1967)

- Pitcher
- Born: October 1, 1967 (age 58); Port Arthur, Texas, U.S.
- Batted: Left Threw: Left

MLB debut
- September 4, 1989, for the Philadelphia Phillies

Last MLB appearance
- October 7, 2001, for the San Diego Padres

MLB statistics
- Win–loss record: 38–30
- Earned run average: 3.90
- Strikeouts: 604
- Stats at Baseball Reference

Teams
- Philadelphia Phillies (1989–1990); Chicago Cubs (1991–1993); Cincinnati Reds (1994–1996); California/Anaheim Angels (1996–1997); Chicago White Sox (1997); Colorado Rockies (1998–1999); New York Mets (1999); Baltimore Orioles (2000–2001); San Diego Padres (2001)

Charles Dwayne McElroy Sr. (born October 1, 1967) is an American former professional baseball player who was a relief pitcher in Major League Baseball from 1989 to 2001.

== Personal life ==
In June 2011, his son C.J. McElroy was selected by the St. Louis Cardinals in the 3rd round of the 2011 MLB draft.
