= Steve Parris =

American baseball player (born 1967)

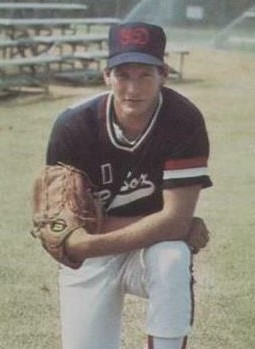
- Pitcher
- Born: December 17, 1967 (age 58); Joliet, Illinois, U.S.
- Batted: Right Threw: Right

MLB debut
- June 21, 1995, for the Pittsburgh Pirates

Last MLB appearance
- June 17, 2003, for the Tampa Bay Devil Rays

MLB statistics
- Win–loss record: 44–49
- Earned run average: 4.75
- Strikeouts: 479
- Stats at Baseball Reference

Teams
- Pittsburgh Pirates (1995–1996); Cincinnati Reds (1998–2000); Toronto Blue Jays (2001–2002); Tampa Bay Devil Rays (2003)

Steven Michael Parris (born December 17, 1967), is a former Major League Baseball pitcher for four teams from 1995-2003. He played for 14 years, including his time in the minors.

== Amateur career ==
Parris attended Joliet West High School in Joliet, Illinois and the University of St. Francis. In 1988, he played collegiate summer baseball in the Cape Cod Baseball League for the Yarmouth-Dennis Red Sox.

He was drafted in the 5th round of the 1989 Major League Baseball draft by the Philadelphia Phillies.

== Professional career ==
His best major league season was 1999, when he posted an 11-4 record with a 3.50 ERA for the Cincinnati Reds. That year, Parris got the start in Cincinnati's one-game playoff against the New York Mets to determine final playoff spot in the National League. He was the losing pitcher in a 5-0 Reds loss, eliminating the team from the playoffs.
