= Rigo Beltrán =

Mexican baseball player (born 1969)

- Pitcher / Bullpen coach
- Born: November 13, 1969 (age 56); Tijuana, Mexico
- Batted: Left Threw: Left

Professional debut
- MLB: June 2, 1997, for the St. Louis Cardinals
- NPB: April 2, 2002, for the Hiroshima Toyo Carp

Last appearance
- NPB: July 6, 2002, for the Hiroshima Toyo Carp
- MLB: April 28, 2004, for the Montreal Expos

MLB statistics
- Win–loss record: 2–3
- Earned run average: 4.40
- Strikeouts: 106

NPB statistics
- Win–loss record: 0–1
- Earned run average: 9.15
- Strikeouts: 20
- Stats at Baseball Reference

Teams
- As player: St. Louis Cardinals (1997); New York Mets (1998–1999); Colorado Rockies (1999–2000); Hiroshima Toyo Carp (2002); Montreal Expos (2004); As coach: Cleveland Guardians (2023)
Medals
Men's baseball
Representing Mexico
Pan American Games
Bronze medal – third place	2003 Santo Domingo	Team competition

Rigoberto Beltrán (born November 13, 1969) is a Mexican former professional baseball left-handed pitcher. He played internationally for the Mexico national team. He served as bullpen coach for the Cleveland Guardians of Major League Baseball (MLB) for the 2023 season.

== Playing career ==
A native of Tijuana, Mexico, Beltrán attended Point Loma High School in San Diego, and is an alumnus of the University of Wyoming. In 1989 and 1990, he played collegiate summer baseball with the Brewster Whitecaps of the Cape Cod Baseball League.

Drafted by the St. Louis Cardinals in the 26th round of the 1991 Major League Baseball draft, Beltrán would make his Major League Baseball debut with the Cardinals on June 2, 1997. He pitched for Mexico at the 2003 Pan American Games, winning a bronze medal. His final game came on April 28, 2004, as a member of the Montreal Expos. On April 10, 1994, while playing for the Arkansas Travelers, he pitched a no-hitter at Shreveport, striking out six and walking two.

== Coaching career ==
From 2007 to 2008, Beltrán was the pitching coach for the Gulf Coast League Reds; he received a promotion to pitching coach of the Single-A Dayton Dragons for the 2009 season.

Beltrán joined the Cleveland Indians/Guardians organization in 2014, serving as pitching coach for their Triple-A affiliate, the Columbus Clippers, from 2019 to 2022. He was named the Guardians' major league bullpen coach on December 20, 2022.

On October 31, 2023, the Guardians announced that Beltrán would not return as bullpen coach for the 2024 season.

Prior to the 2024 season, Beltrán joined the Washington Nationals organization as a pitching coach for the Double-A Harrisburg Senators.
