= 1999 Chicago Cubs season =

1999 Chicago Cubs
- League: National League
- Division: Central
- Ballpark: Wrigley Field
- City: Chicago
- Record: 67–95 (.401)
- Divisional place: 6th
- Owners: Tribune Company
- General managers: Ed Lynch
- Managers: Jim Riggleman
- Television: WGN-TV/Superstation WGN/Fox Sports Chicago (Chip Caray, Steve Stone)
- Radio: WGN (Pat Hughes, Ron Santo, Andy Masur)
- Stats: ESPN.com; Baseball Reference

The 1999 Chicago Cubs season was the 128th season of the Chicago Cubs franchise, the 124th in the National League and the 84th at Wrigley Field. The Cubs finished sixth and last in the National League Central with a record of 67–95.

== Offseason ==
- December 2, 1998: Henry Rodriguez was signed as a free agent with the Chicago Cubs.
- December 7, 1998: Glenallen Hill was signed as a free agent with the Chicago Cubs.

== Regular season ==
=== Season standings ===
NL Central
Team	W	L	Pct.	GB	Home	Road
Houston Astros	97	65	.599	—	50‍–‍32	47‍–‍33
Cincinnati Reds	96	67	.589	1½	45‍–‍37	51‍–‍30
Pittsburgh Pirates	78	83	.484	18½	45‍–‍36	33‍–‍47
St. Louis Cardinals	75	86	.466	21½	38‍–‍42	37‍–‍44
Milwaukee Brewers	74	87	.460	22½	32‍–‍48	42‍–‍39
Chicago Cubs	67	95	.414	30	34‍–‍47	33‍–‍48

=== Record vs. opponents ===
1999 National League record Source: MLB Standings Grid – 1999
Team	AZ	ATL	CHC	CIN	COL	FLA	HOU	LAD	MIL	MON	NYM	PHI	PIT	SD	SF	STL	AL
Arizona	—	4–5	7–2	1–8	6–7	8–1	5–4	7–6	5–4	6–3	7–2	8–1	5–2	11–2	9–3	4–4	7–8
Atlanta	5–4	—	2–5	8–1	5–4	9–4	6–1	5–4	5–2	9–4	9–3	8–5	6–3	5–4	4–5	8–1	9–9
Chicago	2–7	5–2	—	5–8	4–5	6–3	3–9	2–7	6–6	2–5	3–6	2–7	7–6	6–3	1–7	7–5	6–9
Cincinnati	8–1	1–8	8–5	—	7–2	6–1	9–4	4–3	6–6	4–3	5–5	6–3	7–6	6–3	4–5	8–4	7–8
Colorado	7–6	4–5	5–4	2–7	—	5–4	2–6	8–5	6–3	6–3	4–5	5–4	2–7	4–9	4–9	4–5	4–8
Florida	1–8	4–9	3–6	1–6	4–5	—	2–7	7–2	5–4	8–4	3–10	2–11	3–4	3–6	4–5	3–4	11–7
Houston	4–5	1–6	9–3	4–9	6–2	7–2	—	6–3	8–5	7–2	4–5	6–1	5–7	8–1	5–4	5–7	12–3
Los Angeles	6–7	4–5	7–2	3–4	5–8	2–7	3–6	—	7–2	5–4	4–4	6–3	3–6	3–9	8–5	3–6	8–7
Milwaukee	4–5	2–5	6–6	6–6	3–6	4–5	5–8	2–7	—	5–4	2–5	5–4	8–4	3–5	4–5	7–6	8–6
Montreal	3–6	4–9	5–2	3–4	3–6	4–8	2–7	4–5	4–5	—	5–8	6–6	3–6	5–3	4–5	5–4	8–10
New York	2–7	3–9	6–3	5–5	5–4	10–3	5–4	4–4	5–2	8–5	—	6–6	7–2	7–2	7–2	5–2	12–6
Philadelphia	1–8	5–8	7–2	3–6	4–5	11–2	1–6	3–6	4–5	6–6	6–6	—	3–4	6–3	2–6	4–5	11–7
Pittsburgh	2–5	3–6	6–7	6–7	7–2	4–3	7–5	6–3	4–8	6–3	2–7	4–3	—	3–6	4–5	7–5	7–8
San Diego	2–11	4–5	3–6	3–6	9–4	6–3	1–8	9–3	5–3	3–5	2–7	3–6	6–3	—	5–7	2–7	11–4
San Francisco	3–9	5–4	7–1	5–4	9–4	5–4	4–5	5–8	5–4	5–4	2–7	6–2	5–4	7–5	—	6–3	7–8
St. Louis	4–4	1–8	5–7	4–8	5–4	4–3	7–5	6–3	6–7	4–5	2–5	5–4	5–7	7–2	3–6	—	7–8

=== Transactions ===
- July 3, 1999: Carlos Mármol was signed by the Chicago Cubs as an amateur free agent.

=== Roster ===
1999 Chicago Cubs
Roster
Pitchers: 51 Terry Adams; 38 Rick Aguilera; 31 Bobby Ayala; 58 Richard Barker; 53 Micah Bowie; 37 Doug Creek; 44 Kyle Farnsworth; 30 Mark Guthrie; 49 Félix Heredia; 52 Matt Karchner; 56 Ray King; 32 Jon Lieber; 55 Andrew Lorraine; 33 Brian McNichol; 53 Kurt Miller; 45 Terry Mulholland; 59 Rodney Myers; 41 Steve Rain; 27 Scott Sanders; 33 Dan Serafini; 36 Kevin Tapani; 46 Steve Trachsel; 31 Brad Woodall	Catchers: 15 Sandy Martínez; 19 Jose Molina; 16 Jeff Reed; 9 Benito Santiago; Infielders: 24 Manny Alexander; 7 Shane Andrews; 4 Jeff Blauser; 8 Gary Gaetti; 17 Mark Grace; 18 José Hernández; 7 Tyler Houston; 18 Cole Liniak; 20 Chad Meyers; 12 Mickey Morandini; 11 José Nieves	Outfielders: 28 Roosevelt Brown; 19 Curtis Goodwin; 6 Glenallen Hill; 1 Lance Johnson; 35 Bo Porter; 40 Henry Rodríguez; 21 Sammy Sosa; Other batters: 29 Robin Jennings	Manager: 5 Jim Riggleman; Coaches: 43 Dave Bialas (bullpen); 48 Marty DeMerritt (pitching); 39 Tom Gamboa (third base); 2 Jeff Pentland (hitting); 3 Dan Radison (first base); 26 Billy Williams (bench)

== Player stats ==
=== Batting ===
==== Starters by position ====
Note: Pos = Position; G = Games played; AB = At bats; H = Hits; Avg. = Batting average; HR = Home runs; RBI = Runs batted in

Pos	Player	G	AB	H	Avg.	HR	RBI
C	Benito Santiago	109	350	87	.249	7	36
1B	Mark Grace	161	593	183	.309	16	91
2B	Mickey Morandini	144	456	110	.241	4	37
SS	José Hernández	99	342	93	.272	15	43
3B	Gary Gaetti	113	280	57	.204	9	46
LF	Henry Rodríguez	130	447	136	.304	26	87
CF	Lance Johnson	95	335	87	.260	1	21
RF	Sammy Sosa	162	625	180	.288	63	141

==== Other batters ====
Note: G = Games played; AB = At bats; H = Hits; Avg. = Batting average; HR = Home runs; RBI = Runs batted in

Player	G	AB	H	Avg.	HR	RBI
Glenallen Hill	99	253	76	.300	20	55
Tyler Houston	100	249	58	.233	9	27
Jeff Blauser	104	200	48	.240	9	26
José Nieves	54	181	45	.249	2	18
Manny Alexander	90	177	48	.271	0	15
Curtis Goodwin	89	157	38	.242	0	9
Jeff Reed	57	150	39	.260	1	17
Chad Meyers	43	142	33	.232	0	4
Shane Andrews	19	67	17	.254	5	14
Roosevelt Brown	33	64	14	.219	1	10
Sandy Martínez	17	30	5	.167	1	1
Cole Liniak	12	29	7	.241	0	2
Bo Porter	24	26	5	.192	0	0
José Molina	10	19	5	.263	0	1
Robin Jennings	5	5	1	.200	0	0

=== Pitching ===
==== Starting pitchers ====
Note: G = Games pitched; IP = Innings pitched; W = Wins; L = Losses; ERA = Earned run average; SO = Strikeouts

Player	G	IP	W	L	ERA	SO
Steve Trachsel	34	205.2	8	18	5.56	149
Jon Lieber	31	203.1	10	11	4.07	186
Kevin Tapani	23	136.0	6	12	4.83	73
Kyle Farnsworth	27	130.0	5	9	5.05	70
Andrew Lorraine	11	61.2	2	5	5.55	40
Micah Bowie	11	47.0	2	6	9.96	39

==== Other pitchers ====
Note: G = Games pitched; IP = Innings pitched; W = Wins; L = Losses; ERA = Earned run average; SO = Strikeouts

Player	G	IP	W	L	ERA	SO
Terry Mulholland	26	110.0	6	6	5.15	44
Brad Woodall	6	16.0	0	1	5.63	7
Brian McNichol	4	10.2	0	2	6.75	12

==== Relief pitchers ====
Note: G = Games pitched; W = Wins; L = Losses; SV = Saves; ERA = Earned run average; SO = Strikeouts

Player	G	W	L	SV	ERA	SO
Terry Adams	52	6	3	13	4.02	57
Félix Heredia	69	3	1	1	4.85	50
Scott Sanders	67	4	7	2	5.52	89
Rodney Myers	46	3	1	0	4.38	41
Rick Aguilera	44	6	3	8	3.69	32
Dan Serafini	42	3	2	1	6.93	17
Rod Beck	31	2	4	7	7.80	13
Matt Karchner	16	1	0	0	2.50	9
Steve Rain	16	0	1	0	9.20	12
Bobby Ayala	13	0	1	0	2.81	15
Mark Guthrie	11	0	2	0	3.65	9
Ray King	10	0	0	0	5.91	5
Richie Barker	5	0	0	0	7.20	3
Kurt Miller	4	0	0	0	18.00	1
Doug Creek	3	0	0	0	10.50	6
Gary Gaetti	1	0	0	0	18.00	1

== Farm system ==
Level	Team	League	Manager
AAA	Iowa Cubs	Pacific Coast League	Terry Kennedy
AA	West Tenn Diamond Jaxx	Southern League	Dave Trembley
A	Daytona Cubs	Florida State League	Nate Oliver
A	Lansing Lugnuts	Midwest League	Oscar Acosta
A-Short Season	Eugene Emeralds	Northwest League	Bobby Ralston
Rookie	AZL Cubs	Arizona League	Carmelo Martínez
