= Steve Rain =

American baseball player (born 1975)

- Pitcher
- Born: June 2, 1975 (age 51); Los Angeles, California, U.S.
- Batted: Right Threw: Right

MLB debut
- July 17, 1999, for the Chicago Cubs

Last MLB appearance
- September 29, 2000, for the Chicago Cubs

MLB statistics
- Games pitched: 53
- Win–loss record: 3–5
- Earned run average: 5.46
- Strikeouts: 66
- Stats at Baseball Reference

Teams
- Chicago Cubs (1999–2000)

Steven Nicholas Rain (born June 2, 1975) is an American former Major League Baseball player who played pitcher from 1999–2000. He played for the Chicago Cubs.

Rain was selected by the Cubs in the eleventh round of the 1993 Major League Baseball draft from Walnut High School in Walnut, California. He was assigned to the Gulf Coast League to begin his professional career.

On July 8, 1999, Rain was named to the preliminary roster of the United States national baseball team for the 1999 Pan American Games. However, Rain was called up to the Major Leagues for the first time on July 17, 1999 along with pitcher Kyle Farnsworth to fill roster vacancies created by the demotion of catcher Sandy Martínez and injury to relief pitcher Matt Karchner. He made his debut that afternoon, pitching an inning in relief of Farnsworth against the Minnesota Twins at Wrigley Field. Five days later he was returned to the minors after reliever Rod Beck returned from injury. He returned to the Major League roster on August 1 following an injury to reliever Rick Aguilera. He remained on the roster for the remainder of August.

On June 17, 2000, Rain was promoted to the Cubs in conjunction with the demotion of Karchner. He would appear in 37 games in relief for the Cubs over the course of the rest of the season. Following the season, the Cubs declined to offer him a contract and granted him free agency.

Rain was signed by the Kansas City Royals before the 2001 season but was released on February 20, 2001 after arriving late to a practice without notifying the team in advance. Rain spent the 2001 seasons in the farm systems of the Cubs and Milwaukee Brewers. In 2002, he played for the Pensacola Pelicans of the independent Southeastern League. In 2005, he pitched for the Surprise Fightin' Falcons of the independent Golden Baseball League. It would be his final season in professional baseball.
