= Matt Craig =

Matt Craig may refer to:

- Matt Craig (baseball)
- Matt Craig (racing driver)
- Matthew Craig, footballer
