= Daytona Tortugas =

- Founded in 1993; Daytona Beach, Florida
Team logo
Cap insignia

Minor league affiliations
- Class: Single-A (2021–present)
- Previous classes: Class A-Advanced (1993–2020)
- League: Florida State League (1993–present)
- Division: East Division

Major league affiliations
- Team: Cincinnati Reds (2015–present)
- Previous teams: Chicago Cubs (1993–2014)

Minor league titles
- League titles (6): 1995; 2000; 2004; 2008; 2011; 2013
- Division titles (10): 1995; 2000; 2004; 2008; 2011; 2013; 2014; 2015; 2018; 2025
- Second-half titles (1): 2026
- Wild card berths (2): 2024; 2025

Team data
- Previous names: Daytona Cubs (1993–2014)
- Colors: Dark green, dark blue, tan
- Ballpark: Jackie Robinson Ballpark (1993–present)
- Previous parks: Melching Field at Conrad Park (2004)
- Owner(s)/ Operator(s): Tortugas Baseball Club, LLC
- General manager: Jim Jaworski
- Manager: Ricky Gutierrez
- Website: milb.com/daytona

The Daytona Tortugas are a Minor League Baseball team of the Florida State League and the Single-A affiliate of the Cincinnati Reds. They are located in Daytona Beach, Florida, and play their home games at Jackie Robinson Ballpark. Opened in 1914, the park seats 4,200 people.

The club was previously known as the Daytona Cubs from 1993 to 2014 when they were an affiliate of the Chicago Cubs. The team has won six Florida State League championships: in 1995, 2000, 2004 (co-champions with the Tampa Yankees), 2008, 2011, and 2013.

== History ==
=== Daytona Beach Admirals ===
The last Florida State League (FSL) baseball team to play in Daytona Beach, was known as the Daytona Beach Admirals, the Class A affiliate of the Chicago White Sox. In September 1987, the White Sox decided to move their Class A affiliate to Sarasota. This left Daytona without a major league player development contract, resulting in the Admirals' owner selling the team to the New York Mets. The Mets moved the team to Port St. Lucie to become the St. Lucie Mets. Daytona did not have professional baseball for five years after the move.

=== Chicago Cubs ===
Prior to 1993, the Chicago Cubs were affiliated with the Winston Salem Spirits, a Class A team that played in the Carolina League. At the end of the 1992 season, the Cubs decided to move their Class A affiliate to Florida. The Florida State League originally assigned the transplanted Cubs team to play at Baseball City Stadium in Davenport. However, Jordan Kobritz, the new owner and general manager of the minor league franchise, wanted the team to play in Daytona Beach instead. Negotiations to bring the Cubs to Daytona Beach went on for a couple of months and were completed just in time to start the new season.

The Daytona Cubs opened their first season on the road, sweeping the Vero Beach Dodgers, two games to zero. The home opener was scheduled for April 12. Jackie Robinson Ballpark was sold out on opening night. Chelsea Clinton, President Clinton's daughter, was invited to Daytona to throw the opening pitch. The young Ms. Clinton could not attend due to a family medical emergency, and Daytona Beach Mayor Larry Kelly and FSL President Chuck Murphy threw the ceremonial opening pitches instead. The Cubs' public address announcer led fans to sing "Go, Cubs, Go", although with slightly altered lyrics (substituting "Daytona" for "Chicago"). The Daytona Cubs won their home opener 5–2 against the Sarasota White Sox, the Class A affiliate of the Chicago White Sox who left Daytona Beach five years earlier.

=== Cincinnati Reds ===
After the 2014 season, the Cubs ended their affiliation with Daytona, and signed a new contract with the Myrtle Beach Pelicans of the Carolina League. Daytona reached an agreement with the Cincinnati Reds following the 2014 season, and announced the team would be rebranded with a new name with a "local angle" in 2015. They chose the name "Tortugas", Spanish for "turtles".

On June 3, 2015, Big Game Florida, LLC, headed by Andy Rayburn, sold the team to Tortugas Baseball Club, LLC, headed by Reese Smith III with partners Bob Fregolle and Rick French. Smith plans to keep the team in Daytona.

In conjunction with Major League Baseball's restructuring of Minor League Baseball in 2021, the Tortugas were organized into the Low-A Southeast at the Low-A classification, though they remained affiliated with the Reds. In 2022, the Low-A Southeast became known as the Florida State League, the name historically used by the regional circuit prior to the 2021 reorganization, and was reclassified as a Single-A circuit.

=== Season-by-season results ===
Division and League Champions †	Division champions ‡	Post-season Berth *

Year	Record^{[a]}	Win %	League^{[b]}	Division^{[c]}	GB^{[d]}	Post-season record^{[e]}	Post-season win %	Result
1993	57–76	.429	10th	5th	22½	—	—	—
1994	61–73	.455	11th	4th	14½	—	—	—
1995 †	87–48	.644	1st	1st	—	3–2	.600	Clinched Eastern Division title Won FSL Championship vs Fort Myers Miracle, 3–2
1996	71–66	.518	6th	2nd	2	—	—	—
1997	65–73	.471	10th	4th	6½	—	—	—
1998	67–73	.479	9th	3rd	13	—	—	—
1999	63–75	.457	11th	4th	10	—	—	—
2000 †	76–63	.547	5th	2nd	5	5–0	1.000	Won Eastern Division title vs St. Lucie Mets, 2–0; Won FSL Championship vs Dunedin Blue Jays, 3–0
2001	68–68	.500	6th	4th	12½	—	—	—
2002	64–73	.467	8th	5th	16½	—	—	—
2003	66–71	.482	9th	4th	10	—	—	—
2004 †	70–56	.556	4th	2nd	3	2–0	1.000	Won Eastern Division title vs Vero Beach Devil Rays, 2–0; Declared Co-FSL Champions with Tampa Yankees
2005	69–65	.515	5th	2nd	8½	—	—	—
2006	71–66	.518	5th	3rd	5	—	—	—
2007	57–80	.416	11th	6th	17½	—	—	—
2008 †	73–59	.553	3rd	1st	—	5–2	.714	Won Eastern Division title vs Palm Beach Cardinals, 2–1; Won FSL Championship vs Fort Myers Miracle, 3–1
2009	64–71	.474	9th	5th	19	—	—	—
2010	75–64	.540	4th	2nd	5	—	—	—
2011 †	76–61	.555	—	1st	—	5–1	.833	Won North Division title vs Dunedin Blue Jays, 2–1; Won FSL Championship vs St. Lucie Mets, 3–0
2012	59–74	.444	9th	6th	19	—	—	—
2013 †	75–51	.595	1st	1st	—	5–1	.833	Won North Division title vs Dunedin Blue Jays, 2–0; Won FSL Championship vs Charlotte Stone Crabs, 3–1
2014 ‡	67–69	.493	2nd	1st	—	3–3	.500	Won North Division title vs Dunedin Blue Jays, 2–0; Lost FSL Championship vs Fort Myers Miracle, 3–1
2015 ‡	77–58	.570	2nd	1st	—	3–3	.500	Won North Division title vs Clearwater Threshers, 2–0; Lost FSL Championship vs Charlotte Stone Crabs, 3–1
2016	76–61	.555	3rd	3rd	6.5	–	–	–
2017	53–80	.398	11th	5th	31.0	–	–	–
2018 ‡	69–66	.511	6th	3rd	7.0	3–4	.428	Won North Division title vs Clearwater Threshers, 2–1; Lost FSL Championship vs Fort Myers Miracle, 3–1
2019	66–68	.494	7th	3rd	13.5	–	–	–
2020	Season cancelled due to the COVID-19 pandemic							
2021	60–60	.500	6th	3rd	2.5	–	–	–
2022	54–74	.422	10th	4th	18.5	–	–	–
2023	56–72	.438	9th	3rd	12	–	–	–
2024 *	64–64	.500	6th	2nd	18	0–2	.000	Lost semifinals vs Palm Beach Cardinals, 2–0
2025 ‡	65–66	.496	5th	2nd	12.5	2–3	.400	Won East Division title vs Palm Beach Cardinals, 2–1; Lost FSL Championship vs Lakeland Flying Tigers, 2–0
2026 *	58–73	.443	9th	4th	8.5	0–2	.000	Lost semifinals vs Jupiter Hammerheads, 2–0
Totals	2,208 – 2,215	.499	—	—	—	36–23	.610	10 Division titles, 6 FSL Championships

== Ballparks ==
=== Jackie Robinson Ballpark ===
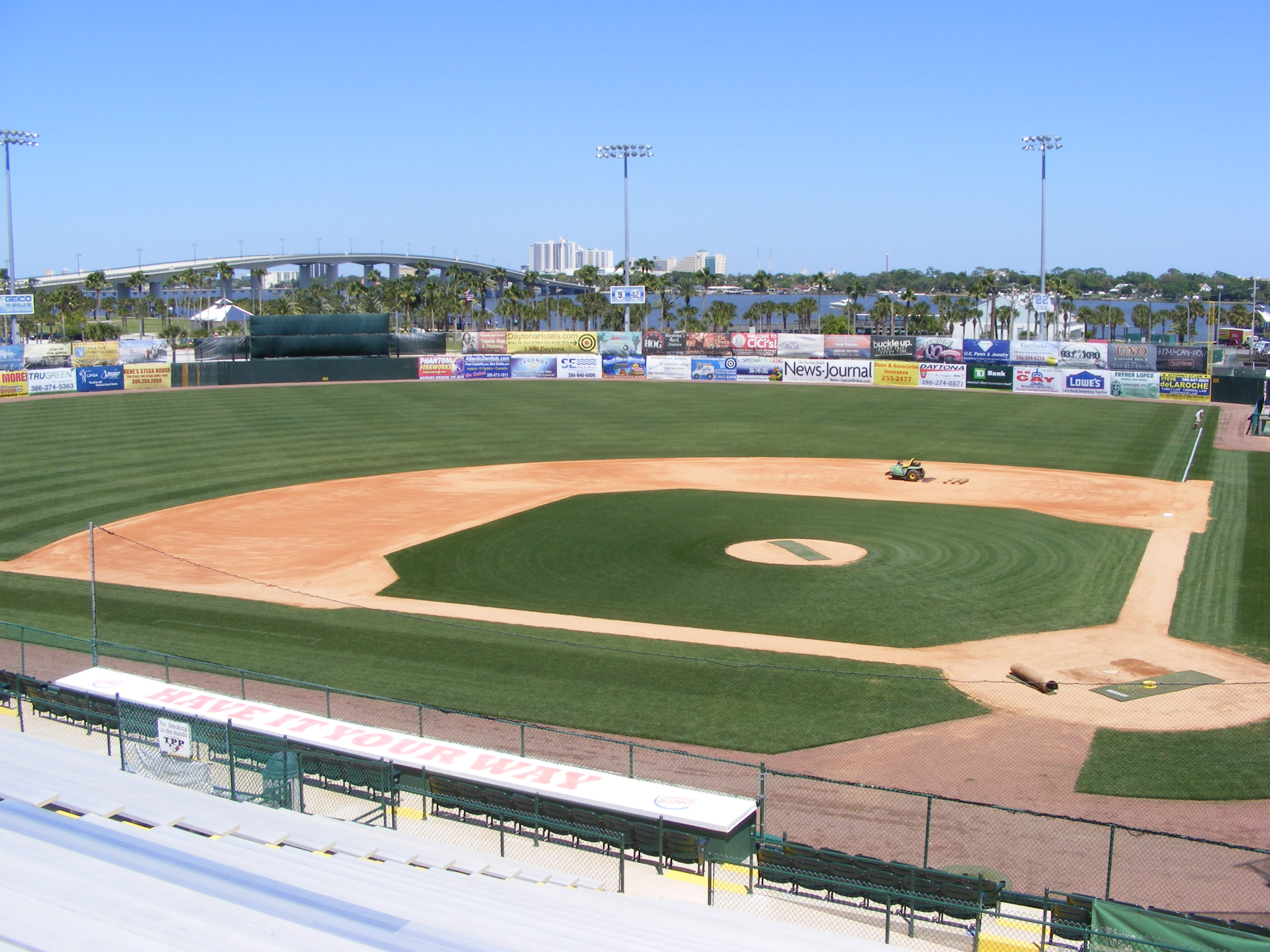
Jackie Robinson Ballpark

The Daytona Tortugas' current, and only, ballpark is Jackie Robinson Ballpark. The venue has experienced several expansions and renovations since its completion in 1914, and currently seats 4,200 spectators.

=== Melching Field at Conrad Park ===
In 1999, Daytona Cubs' owner and General Manager Jordan Kobritz decided to move a home game to Melching Field at Conrad Park, located in nearby DeLand. This ballpark is the home of the Stetson University Hatters baseball team. Kobritz's goal was to generate some fan interest in the Cubs, in the western part of Volusia County. The game (vs. the St. Petersburg Devil Rays) was played on June 26, 1999. In August 2004, the D-Cubs had to move several games to Melching Field, due to damage to Jackie Robinson Ballpark, caused by Hurricane Charley. The Cubs paid another visit to Melching Field on June 20, 2007, when they played a double-header against the Palm Beach Cardinals. The game was moved this time to benefit a local charity in DeLand, as well as provide another opportunity to showcase the Daytona Cubs to fans in DeLand.

== Uniforms ==
=== Current ===
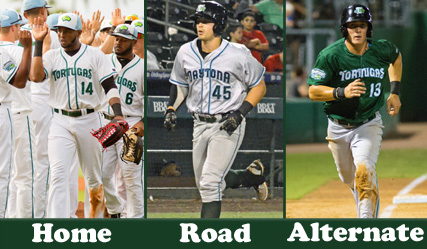
A picture of the different Daytona Tortugas uniforms: Home, Road & Alternate

The team's color scheme consists of blue and green. Jerseys and pants for home games are made of white fabric with green trim, while those for road games are made of gray fabric with blue trim. On home jerseys, the word "Tortugas" is scripted across the chest in green. On road jerseys, the word "Daytona" is written across the chest in blue script. The player's number is written on the back in large green characters surrounded by blue.

The team's batting practice uniforms, which double as alternate uniforms, are made of green fabric. "Tortugas" is written across the chest in white script, trimmed in blue. There is a Daytona Tortugas logo on the right shoulder. Numbers, in white surrounded by blue, are sewn on the back in block characters.

The official home and road caps were green with Daytona Tortugas logo centered on the front. The batting practice/alternate caps are blue in color, with a white front and blue brim. The alternate Shelldon head logo is in the center of the cap. A green belt is typically worn.

=== Past ===
From 1993 to 2014 as the Cubs, the team's color scheme consisted of red, white, and blue, the same colors used by the Chicago Cubs. The uniforms of the Daytona Cubs were descendants of the Chicago Cubs' uniforms. Jerseys and pants for home games were made of white fabric with blue pinstripes, while those for road games were made of gray fabric with blue pinstripes. On home jerseys, the Chicago Cubs logo was located on the left chest, and a Daytona Cubs logo was located on the left sleeve. On road jerseys, the word "Daytona" was written across the chest in red script, and a Daytona Cubs logo was present on the left shoulder. The player's number was written on the back in large blue characters surrounded by red. Blue T-shirts of varying sleeve lengths were worn underneath the jerseys. The team's batting practice uniforms, which doubled as alternate uniforms, were made of light blue fabric with white pinstripes. "Daytona" was written across the chest in red script. There was a Daytona Cubs logo on the left shoulder. Numbers, in blue surrounded by red, were sewn on the back in block characters. The official home and road caps were blue with either the Chicago Cubs or Daytona Cubs logo centered on the front. A blue belt was worn on all the different uniforms along with blue ankle-length socks.

== Mascot ==
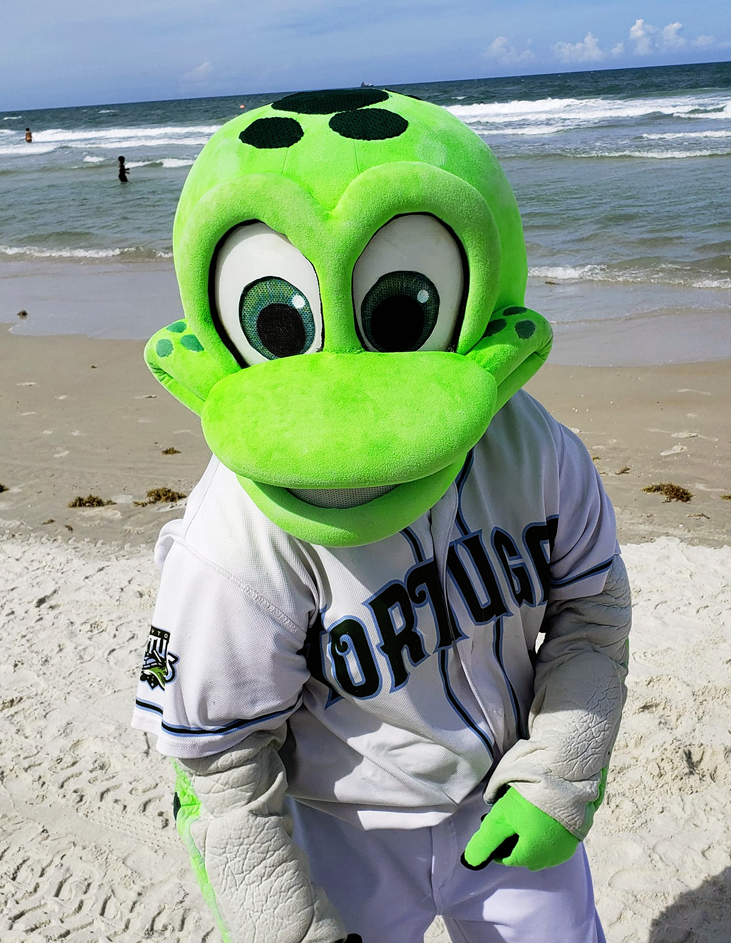
Shelldon, the mascot of MiLB's Daytona Tortugas, on the shores of Daytona Beach

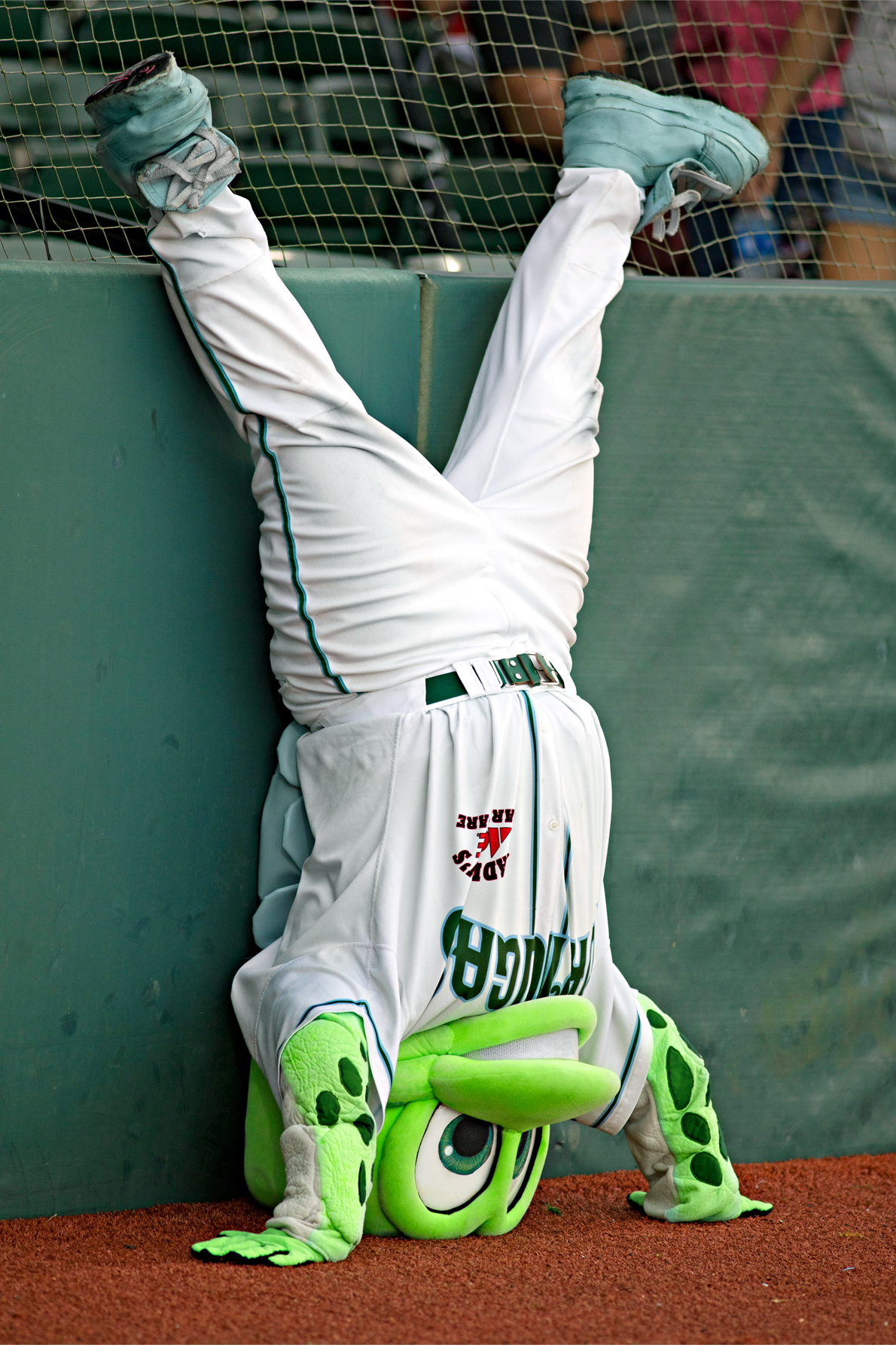
Shelldon, the Daytona Tortugas mascot, with his signature headstand

The team's mascot is an anthropomorphic turtle ("Tortuga") named Shelldon. Since his first season in 2015, "Daytona's favorite party animal" acts as the team's Goodwill Ambassador, visiting local schools and charity events when he is not performing at home games.

Shelldon is a green and white sea turtle with a blue shell on his back, dark green spots, and an occasional backwards cap. He sports his white Tortuga jersey almost daily but changes into elaborate costumes for on-field skits and performances. Daytona Tortuga fans have learned to not get attached to any particular players, since the reward for superior play is to be taken away from Daytona and sent up to a higher farm team. Shelldon has been an substitute to represent the team to the public and can constantly be seen tumbling, breakdancing, and generating fun around Daytona.

Shelldon was also named the #1 Florida State League Mascot by The Athletic.

He is also joined by Shelly, a female turtle who supports the Tortugas' involvement in the community and is Shelldon's girlfriend. She debuted as the second team mascot in 2018.

=== Past ===
Prior to becoming the Tortugas, the Daytona Cubs originally used a version of the Chicago Cubs emblem. In 1994, the Cubs hired Benedict Advertising, a local marketing firm, to develop a new logo. Benedict's design department created a bear cub wearing sunglasses and a backwards baseball cap.

As a mascot, Cubby first appeared on the field on May 27, 1994. He had brown fur and wore the same style of uniform as the team, but wearing his hat backwards.

== Media ==
=== Radio ===
Justin Rocke, the Tortugas Director of Broadcasting and Media Relations, provided the play-by-play coverage until leaving in the 2023 Season.

On April 1, 2023, Brennan Mense took over the role of Tortugas Director of Broadcasting and Media Relations, and provides the play-by-play coverage currently.

=== Print ===
Local newspaper coverage of the team is provided by The Daytona Beach News-Journal.

== Memorable events and records ==
=== Four home runs in a game ===
- Ryan Harvey, July 28, 2006, game vs. Clearwater Threshers (Daytona won, 10–9), hit four home runs in one game.
- Javier Báez, June 10, 2013, game vs. Fort Myers Miracle (Daytona won 9–6), hit four home runs in one game.

=== Hitting for the cycle ===
Five Daytona players have hit for the cycle to date:

- Adam Greenberg, August 17, 2002, game vs. St. Lucie Mets (Daytona won, 17–1)
- Félix Pie, June 27, 2004, game vs. Fort Myers Miracle (Daytona won, 15–14, 10 innings)
- Brett Jackson, June 14, 2010, game vs. Lakeland Flying Tigers (Daytona won, 6–4, 11 innings)
- Albert Almora, July 14, 2014, game vs. Jupiter Hammerheads (Daytona won, 13–8, 13 innings)
- Carlos Jorge, July 21, 2023 vs. Jupiter Hammerheads (Daytona lost, 16–4) First Cycle by a Daytona Tortuga

=== No-hitters ===
- Matt Loosen, July 8, 2013, at Dunedin Blue Jays (Daytona won 7–0). Loosen allowed no hits over a full nine innings of work, while walking two and striking out nine.
- Ben Wells, Kyler Burke, Zach Cates; Wednesday, August 21 at Dunedin Blue Jays and Tuesday, August 27, 2013, vs. Dunedin Blue Jays (Daytona won 1–0). Ben Wells pitched a hitless first inning in the first game of a scheduled doubleheader on August 21 at Dunedin, until a rainstorm caused the game to be suspended and eventually completed on August 27 at Daytona (where the Cubs were still the road team, despite playing in their home ballpark). In the resumption of the game on August 27, Kyler Burke didn't allow a hit in five innings of work and Zach Cates closed the game out with a 1–2–3 seventh inning. The game is more than a baseball rarity, considering the no-hitter was technically thrown in two cities, separated by 163 miles of driving distance.
- Tyler Mahle, June 13, 2016, at Jupiter Hammerheads (Daytona won 4–0). Mahle became the first FSL pitcher to toss a nine-inning solo no-hitter since Loosen did it for Daytona almost three years earlier. The only baserunner was a hit batter in the second inning, as Mahle faced the minimum (due to a doubleplay) and struck out six.
- James Proctor, Vin Timpanelli, Ricky Karcher, Nick Hanson and Carson Spiers combined for a 1–0 no-hitter on May 22, 2021 at home against the Jupiter Hammerheads.

== Roster ==
Daytona Tortugas roster
Players		Coaches/Other
Pitchers: 28 Dony Aguilera; 38 Jake Brink; 29 Jesus Colina; 14 Abraham Gaitan; 41 Justin Henschel; 7 Tyner Horn; 16 Lisnerkin Lantigua; 16 Duncan Martsen; 8 Ryjeteri Merite; 1 Ethan Norby; 24 Braden Osbolt; 40 Luis Pimentel; 5 Iker Redona; 31 Dusty Revis; 23 Alejandro Rivera; 21 Bryan Salgado; 27 Dominic Scheffler; 45 Tristan Smith; 33 Logan Tanner; 20 Aaron Watson	Catchers: 35 Ian Francis; 10 Henry Hunter; 28 Dylan King; 13 Jirvin Morillo; Infielders: 3 Anielson Buten; 4 Ichiro Cano; 11 Jalen Hairston; 6 Steele Hall; 17 Sherman Johnson; 48 Mulivai Levu; 34 Yael Romero; 2 Rafhlmil Torres; Outfielders: 37 Drew Davies; 44 Arnaldo Lantigua; 25 Adolfo Sanchez	Manager: 11 Willie Harris; Coaches: 2 Karavin Dew (performance); 30 Lenny Harris (bench); 50 Jason Immekus (pitching); 18 Jose Leon (hitting); 60-day injured list: 28 Ben Brutti; -- Luke Holman; 24 Sheng-En Lin; -- Gabe Starks (full season); 7-day injured list; * On Cincinnati Reds 40-man roster; ~ Development list; # Rehab assignment; ∞ Reserve list; ‡ Restricted list; § Suspended list; † Temporarily inactive list; Roster updated September 16, 2026; Transactions; → More rosters: MiLB • Florida State League; → Cincinnati Reds minor league players

== Notable alumni ==
=== Florida State League ===
Some Daytona players have distinguished themselves in the Florida State League

- Matt Craig, 2006 FSL All-Star First Baseman
- Jake Fox, 2006 FSL All-Star Catcher
- Sean Gallagher, 2006 FSL All-Star Pitcher
- Mitch Atkins, 2007 FSL All-Star pitcher
- Tyler Colvin, 2007 FSL All-Star outfielder
- Chris Amador, 2007 FSL All-Star outfielder
- Jesus Valdez, 2007 FSL All-Star outfielder
- Matt Matulia, 2007 FSL All-Star outfielder
- Alex Maestri, 2008 FSL All-Star pitcher
- Ryan Searle, 2009 FSL All-Star pitcher
- Starlin Castro, 2009 FSL All-Star infielder
- Aaron Shafer, 2010 FSL All-Star pitcher
- Brett Jackson, 2010 FSL All-Star outfielder
- Frank Batista, 2011 FSL All-Star pitcher
- Justin Bour, 2011 FSL All-Star first baseman
- Evan Crawford, 2011 FSL All-Star outfielder
- Aaron Kurcz, 2011 FSL All-Star pitcher
- Junior Lake, 2011 FSL All-Star shortstop
- Arismendy Alcantara, 2012 FSL All-Star infielder
- John Andreoli, 2012–2013 FSL All-Star outfielder
- Austin Kirk, 2012 FSL All-Star pitcher
- Matt Loosen, 2012 FSL All-Star pitcher
- Nelson Perez, 2012 FSL All-Star pitcher
- Greg Rohan, 2012 FSL All-Star infielder
- Matt Szczur, 2012 FSL All-Star outfielder
- Javier Baez, 2013 FSL All-Star infielder
- Frank Del Valle, 2013 FSL All-Star pitcher
- Dustin Geiger, 2013 FSL All-Star infielder
- Jorge Soler, 2013 FSL All-Star outfielder
- Gioskar Amaya, 2014 FSL All-Star infielder
- Marco Hernandez, 2014 FSL All-Star infielder
- Bijan Rademacher, 2014 FSL All-Star outfielder
- Felix Pena, 2014 FSL All-Star pitcher
- Andrew McKirahan, 2014 FSL All-Star pitcher
- Joe Hudson, 2015 FSL All-Star catcher
- Alex Blandino, 2015 FSL All-Star infielder
- Phillip Ervin, 2015 FSL All-Star outfielder
- Nick Travieso, 2015 FSL All-Star pitcher
- Jake Ehret, 2016 FSL All-Star pitcher
- Jimmy Herget, 2016 FSL All-Star pitcher
- Aristides Aquino, 2016 FSL All-Star outfielder & FSL Player of the Year

=== Major League players ===
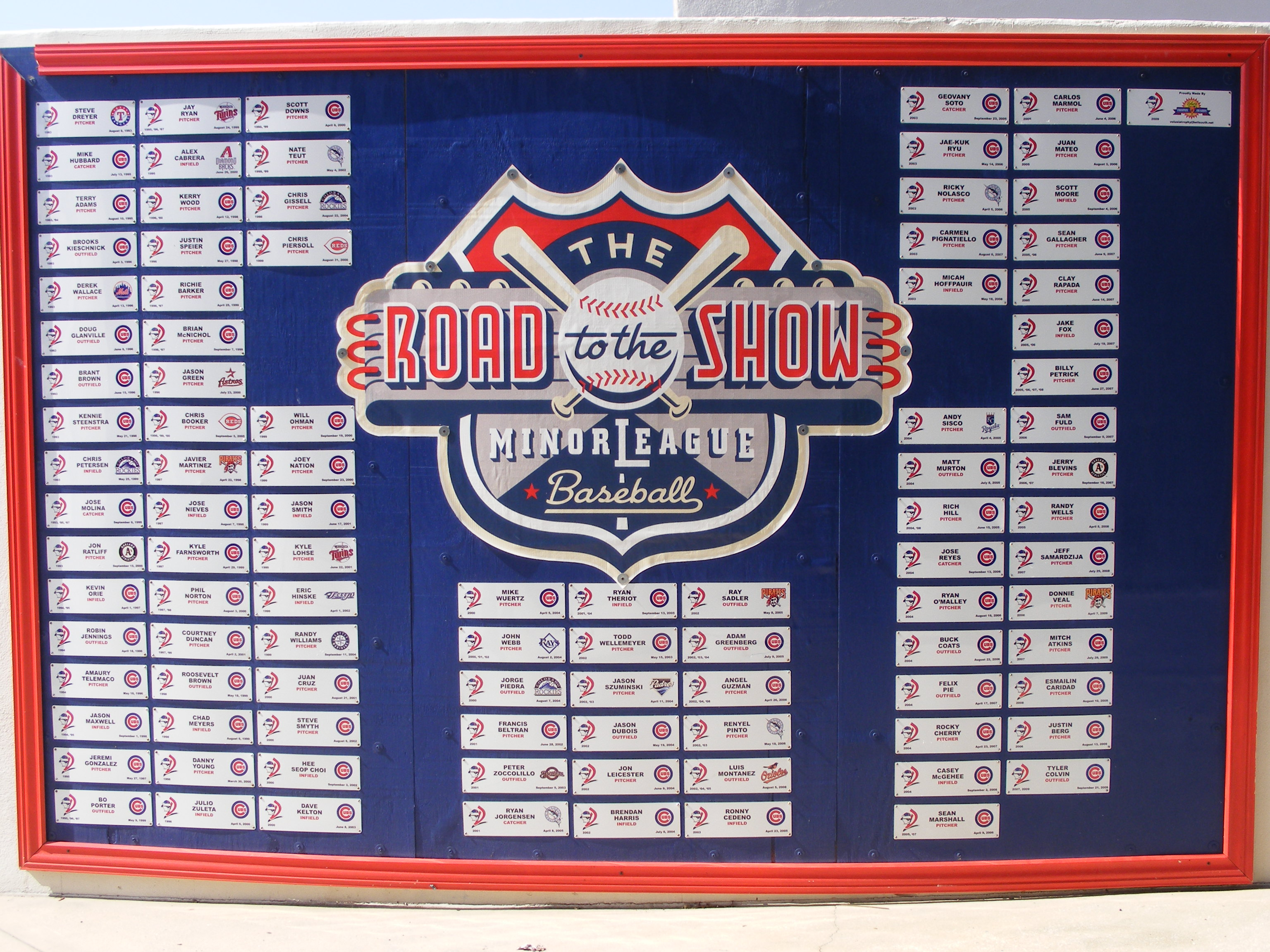
Wall plaque inside Jackie Robinson Ballpark recognizing Daytona players who eventually rose to play in the major leagues

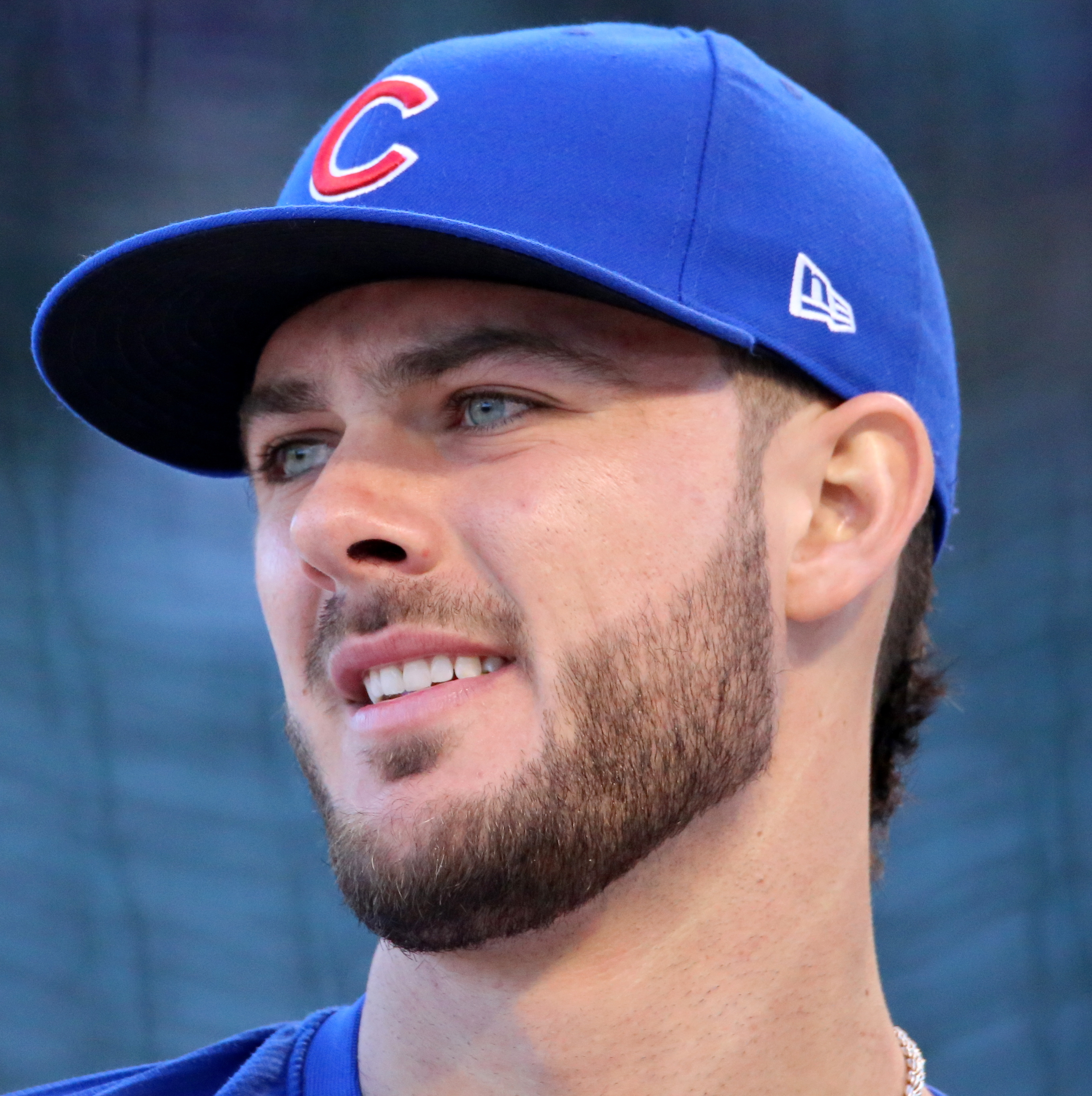
Kris Bryant

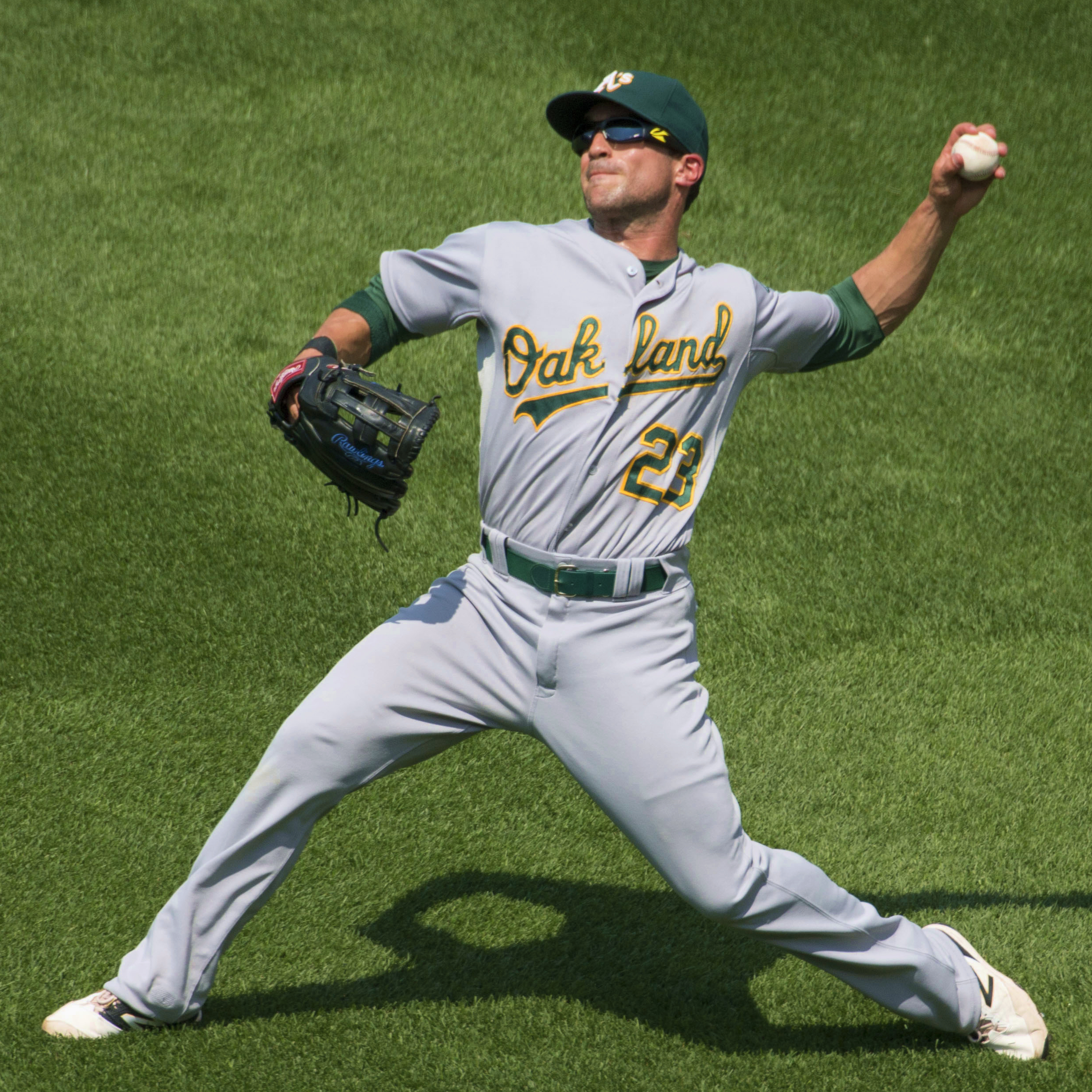
Sam Fuld

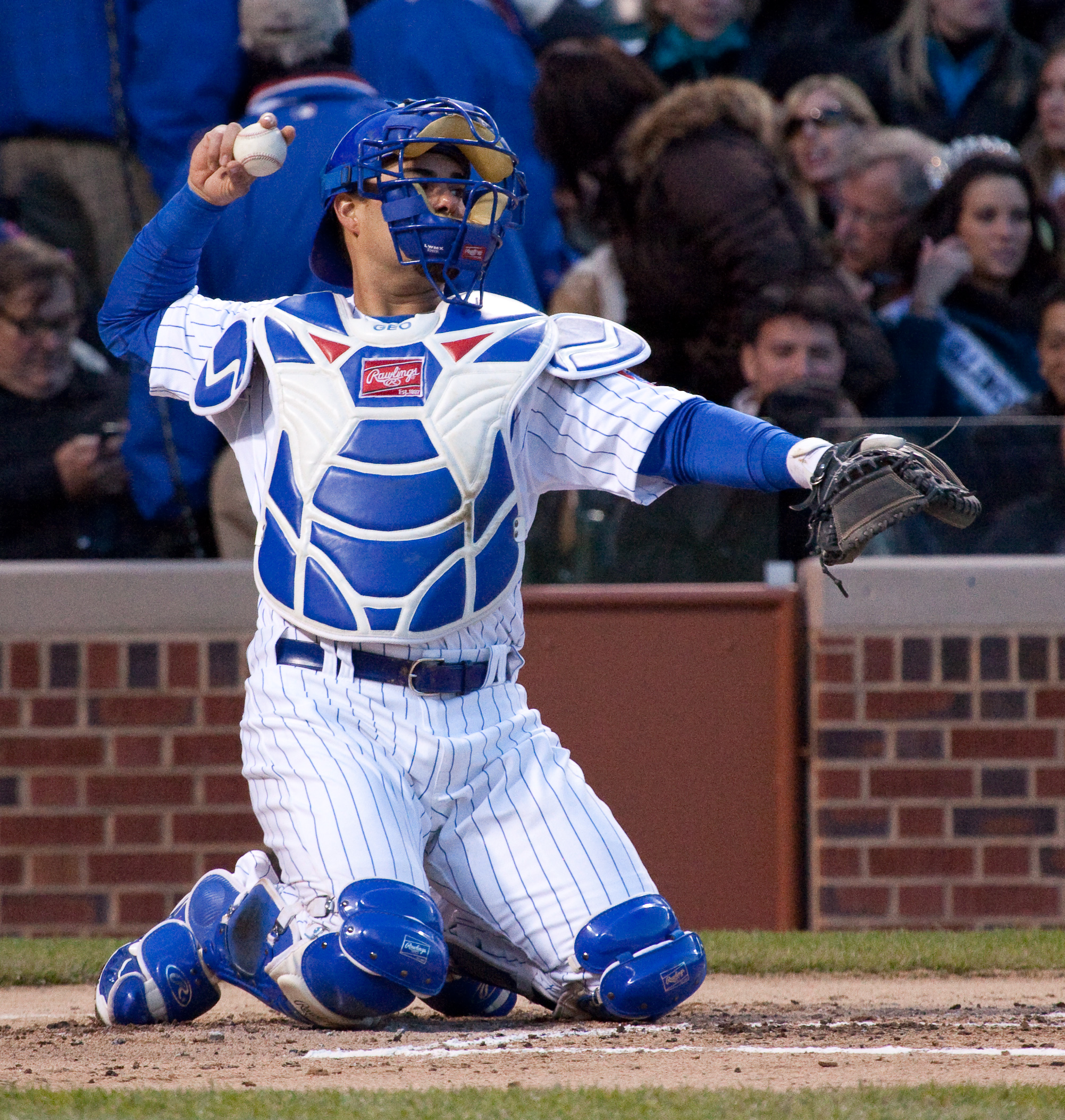
Geovany Soto

Many Daytona players have advanced to play in the major leagues.

- Terry Adams, right-handed pitcher
- James Adduci, outfielder
- Christopher Archer, pitcher
- Mitch Atkins, right-handed pitcher
- Javier Báez, middle infielder
- Richie Barker, right-handed pitcher
- Francis Beltrán, right-handed pitcher
- Jerry Blevins, left-handed pitcher
- Roosevelt Brown, outfielder
- Kris Bryant, third baseman
- Alex Cabrera, first baseman
- Russ Canzler, infield
- Esmailin Caridad, right-handed pitcher
- Andrew Cashner, right-handed pitcher
- Starlin Castro, shortstop
- José Ceda, right-handed pitcher
- Ronny Cedeño, shortstop
- Hunter Cervenka, left-handed pitcher
- Rocky Cherry, right-handed pitcher
- Robinson Chirinos, catcher
- Hee-seop Choi, first baseman
- Buck Coats, outfielder
- Casey Coleman, pitcher
- Tyler Colvin, outfielder
- Juan Cruz, right-handed pitcher
- Dayán Díaz, right-handed pitcher
- Brian Dopirak, first baseman
- Scott Downs, left-handed pitcher
- Courtney Duncan, pitcher
- Carl Edwards, Jr., right-handed pitcher
- Scott Eyre, left-handed pitcher
- Kyle Farnsworth, right-handed pitcher
- Kevin Foster, right-handed pitcher
- Chad Fox, right-handed pitcher
- Jake Fox, utility player
- Sam Fuld, outfielder
- Sean Gallagher, right-handed pitcher
- Chris Gissell, pitcher
- Doug Glanville, outfielder
- Geremi González, right-handed pitcher
- Tom Gordon, right-handed pitcher
- Adam Greenberg, outfielder
- Brandon Guyer, outfielder
- Ángel Guzmán, right-handed pitcher
- Rich Hill, left-handed pitcher
- Eric Hinske, infielder and outfielder
- Micah Hoffpauir, first baseman and outfielder
- Brett Jackson, outfielder
- Jay Jackson, pitcher
- Robin Jennings, outfielder
- Ryan Jorgensen, catcher
- David Kelton, infielder and outfielder
- Brooks Kieschnick, pitcher and outfielder
- Chang-Yong Lim, right-handed pitcher
- Casey McGehee, infielder
- Carlos Mármol, right-handed pitcher
- Sean Marshall, left-handed pitcher
- Javier Martínez, right-handed pitcher
- Juan Mateo, right-handed pitcher
- Adalberto Méndez, right-handed pitcher
- Chad Meyers, infielder
- José Molina, catcher
- Lou Montañez, outfielder
- Scott Moore, infielder
- Matt Murton, outfielder
- Ricky Nolasco, right-handed pitcher
- Phil Norton, left-handed pitcher
- Will Ohman, left-handed pitcher
- Ryan O'Malley, left-handed pitcher
- Rey Ordóñez, shortstop
- Kevin Orie, third baseman
- David Patton, right-handed pitcher
- Félix Pie, outfielder
- Carmen Pignatiello, left-handed pitcher
- Renyel Pinto, left-handed pitcher
- Bo Porter, outfielder
- Clay Rapada, left-handed pitcher
- José Reyes, catcher
- James Russell, left-handed pitcher
- Jae Kuk Ryu, right-handed pitcher
- Ray Sadler, outfielder
- Jeff Samardzija, right-handed pitcher
- Ryne Sandberg, infielder
- Brian Schlitter, right-handed pitcher
- Andrew Sisco, left-handed pitcher
- Jason Smith, infielder
- Steve Smyth, left-handed pitcher
- Jorge Soler, outfielder
- Geovany Soto, catcher
- Justin Speier, right-handed pitcher
- Jason Szuminski, right-handed pitcher
- Kevin Tapani, right-handed pitcher
- Amaury Telemaco, right-handed pitcher
- Nate Teut, left-handed pitcher
- Ryan Theriot, infielder
- Ismael Valdez, right-handed pitcher
- Donnie Veal, left-handed pitcher
- Dan Vogelbach, first baseman
- Duane Ward, right-handed pitcher
- John Webb, pitcher
- Zack Weiss, right-handed pitcher
- Todd Wellemeyer, right-handed pitcher
- Randy Wells, right-handed pitcher
- Randy Williams, pitcher
- Kerry Wood, right-handed pitcher
- Michael Wuertz, right-handed pitcher
- Carlos Zambrano, right-handed pitcher
- Pete Zoccolillo, outfielder

== Managers ==
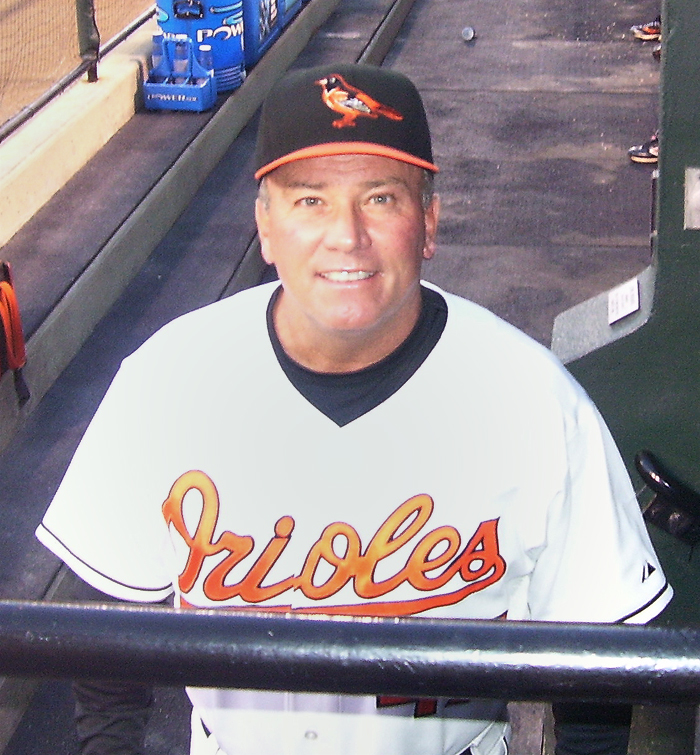
Dave Trembley, Daytona manager from 1995 to 1996 and 2001 to 2002

Thirteen men have managed Daytona baseball teams since the franchise's inception in 1993. Six managers have guided the team to win the FSL Championship: Dave Trembley (1995), Richie Zisk (2000), Steve McFarland (2004), Jody Davis (2008), Buddy Bailey (2011), and Dave Keller (2013). Trembley won 290 games from 1995 to 1996 and 2001 to 2002, placing him first on the all-time wins list for Daytona managers. Having managed the team for 545 games, he is also the longest-tenured manager in team history. The manager with the highest winning percentage over a full season or more is Steve McFarland (.556). Conversely, the lowest winning percentage over a season or more is .429 by the team's first manager, Bill Hays. Buddy Bailey managed his first Daytona game in 2006, was replaced as manager following the season but returned to Daytona in 2009. Eli Marrero managed the Tortugas from 2015 to 2017. Former shortstop Ricky Gutierrez, who won a World Series with the Boston Red Sox in 2004 and was the Tortugas bench coach in 2017, was named the team's full-time manager for the 2018 season.

#	Manager	Years	Games	Wins	Losses	Win %	Post-season Appearances	Post-season Wins	Post-season Losses	Post-season Win %	Ref
1	Bill Hays	1993	133	57	76	.429	–	–	–	–	
2	Ken Bolek	1994	134	61	73	.455	–	–	–	–	
3	Dave Trembley	1995–1996	272	158	114	.581	1	3	2	.600	
4	Steve Roadcap	1997–1998	278	132	146	.475	–	–	–	–	
5	Nate Oliver	1999	138	63	75	.457	–	–	–	–	
6	Richie Zisk	2000	139	76	63	.547	1	5	0	1.000	
—	Dave Trembley	2001–2002	273	132	141	.484	–	–	–	–	
7	Rick Kranitz	2003	137	66	71	.482	–	–	–	–	
8	Steve McFarland	2004	126	70	56	.556	1	2	0	1.000	
—	Richie Zisk	2005	134	69	65	.515	–	–	–	–	
9	Don Buford	2006	70	35	35	.500	–	–	–	–	
—	Buddy Bailey	2009–2011	274	215	196	.523	1	5	1	.833	
10	Brian Harper	2012	133	59	74	.444	–	–	–	–	
11	Dave Keller	2013–2014	274	149	125	.544	2	8	4	.667	
12	Eli Marrero	2015–2017	278	156	122	.561	1	3	3	.500	
13	Ricky Gutierrez	2018–2019	269	135	134	.502	1	3	7	.300	
14	Travis Dawkins	2021– 2022	248	114	134	.460	–	–	–	–	
15	Julio Morillo	2023-2024	85	39	46	.459	–	–	–	–	
16	Willie Harris	2025-									
Totals			3850	1942	1908	.504	9	34	19	.642	—

== Photos ==
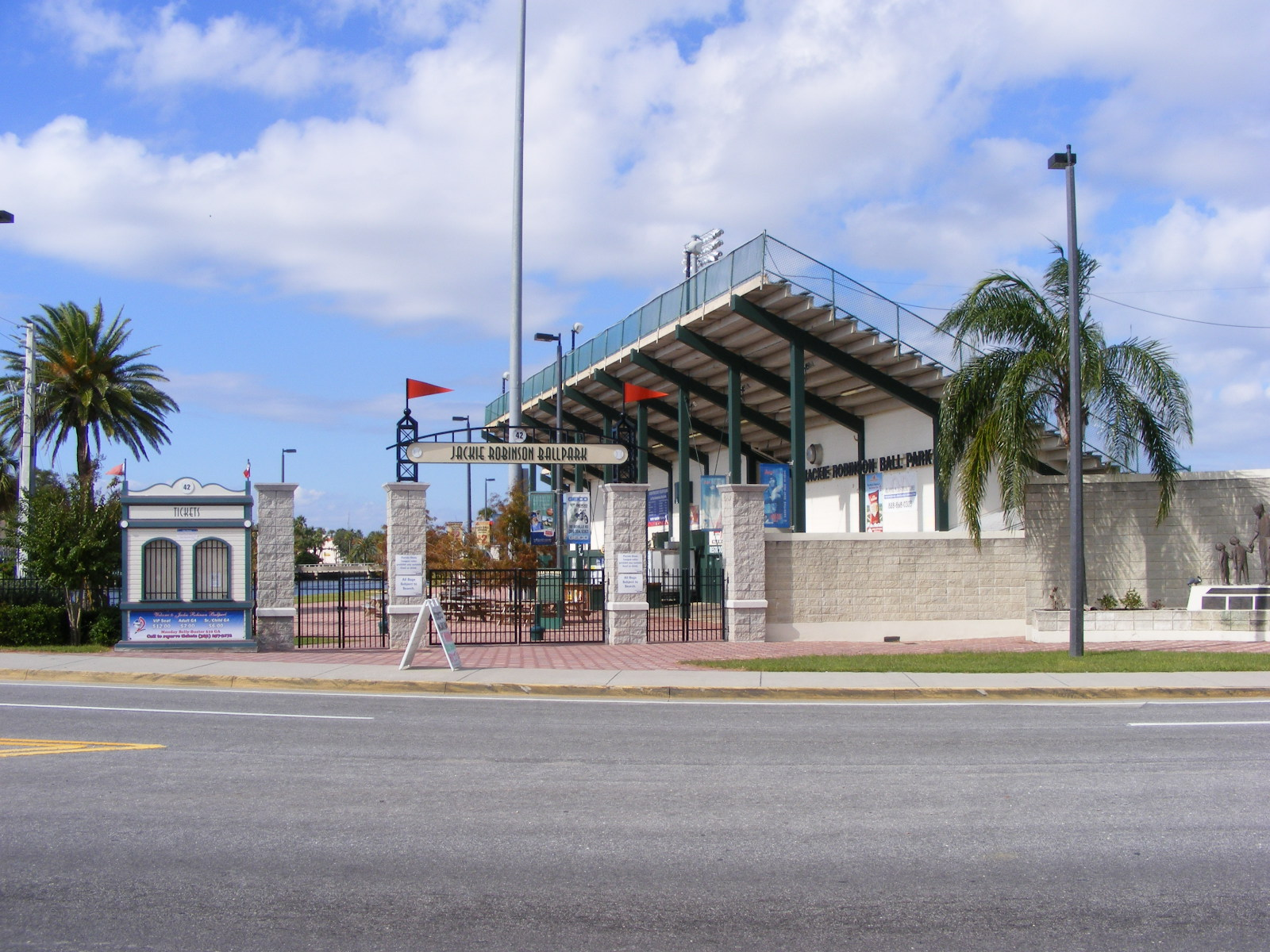
The outside of Radiology Associates Field at Jackie Robinson Ballpark

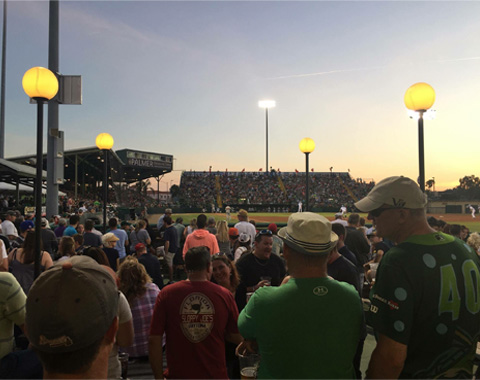
Daytona Tortugas fans taking in a game at The Jack from the Bud Bullpen

== Notes ==
- ^{a} The Record column indicates wins and losses during the regular season and excludes any post-season play.
- ^{b} This column indicates position in the overall league standings.
- ^{c} This column indicates position in the overall divisional standings.
- ^{d} The GB column indicates "Games Behind" the team that finished in first place in the division that season. It is determined by finding the difference in wins plus the difference in losses divided by two.
- ^{e} The Record column indicates wins and losses during the post-season.
