= Marty DeMerritt =

American baseball player and coach (1953–2025)

- Pitching coach
- Born: March 4, 1953; San Francisco, California, U.S.
- Died: January 11, 2025 (aged 71); Port Charlotte, Florida, U.S.
- Batted: Left Threw: Left
- Stats at Baseball Reference

Career highlights and awards
- 1989 World Series Champion (bullpen coach)

Martin Gordon "Mad Dog" DeMerritt (March 4, 1953 – January 11, 2025) was an American professional baseball coach and a former minor league pitcher. DeMerritt was the interim bullpen coach for the 1989 World Series Champion San Francisco Giants, pitching coach for the 1999 Chicago Cubs, and spent the last 22 of his 36-season coaching career as a beloved figure in the Tampa Bay Rays system.

== Biography ==
Born in San Francisco, DeMerritt graduated from South San Francisco High School and was selected by the St. Louis Cardinals in the 22nd round of the 1971 Major League Baseball draft. The right-hander was listed at 6 feet 2 inches (1.88 m) tall and 203 pounds (92 kg). His active career, plagued by a sore arm, lasted eight seasons (1971–1977) in the Cardinals, Milwaukee Brewers and Houston Astros organizations, peaking at the Double-A level.

Out of professional baseball at age 25, he worked in construction and as a bounty-hunter in California. He also coached in youth baseball in the San Francisco Bay area.

In 1983 he was hired as a minor league pitching coach by his hometown Giants, working with the club's affiliates in Clinton (1983), Fresno (1984-85), Shreveport (1986-87) and Phoenix (1988-89), before joining the staff of the big league team in September 1989.

In 1990, DeMerritt became the pitching coach for the Samsung Lions, becoming the first American to hold that position in Korea.

He returned to the Giants in 1991 and then joined the Florida Marlins expansion team in 1992 as a pitching coach for their minor-league affiliates between 1992–94, before moving to the Cubs as a minor league coach (1995–98, including two years in Triple-A). Manager Jim Riggleman made him the pitching coach for the 1999 Cubs, but he was let go following a disappointing 67-95 season. He was the Pittsburgh Pirates minor league pitching coordinator in 2000.

In 2001, the Tampa Bay Devil Rays hired DeMerritt as a pitching coach at the Class A level. He remained with the Rays organization, working primarily with low level pitches, until retiring after the 2023 season.

DeMerritt died on January 11, 2025, at the age of 71.

Preceded by Phil Regan	Chicago Cubs pitching coach 1999	Succeeded by Oscar Acosta
