= Dave Keller =

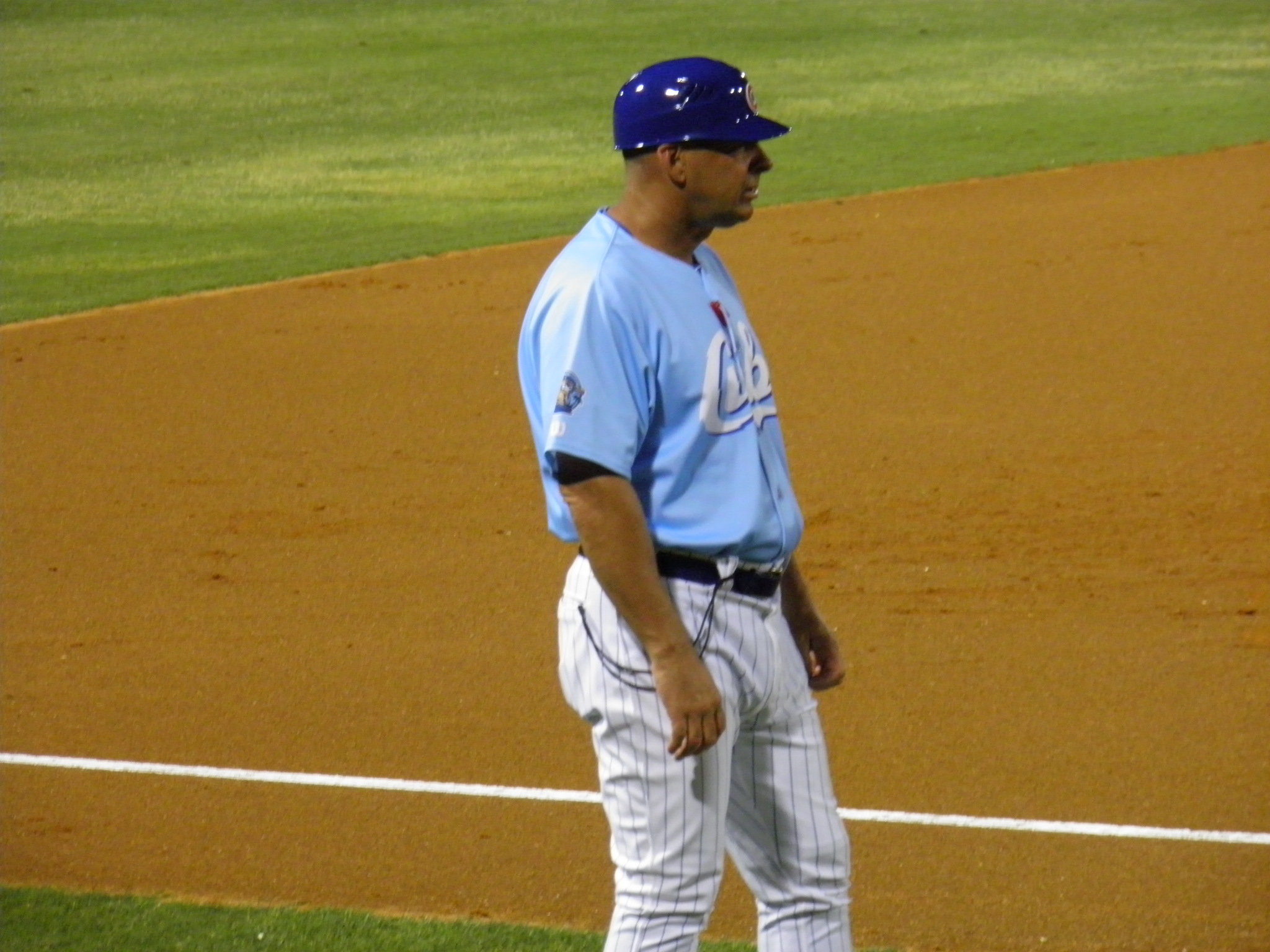
- Keller as manager of the Daytona Cubs in 2013

Daytona Cubs
- Manager
- Born: September 28, 1959 (age 66)
- Stats at Baseball Reference

Teams
- Daytona Cubs (2013)

Dave Keller (born September 28, 1959) is a former minor league baseball player, coach and manager and major league coach for the Cleveland Indians. He is currently the bench coach for the Colorado Rockies Single A affiliate Fresno Grizzlies.

Keller attended the University of Northern Colorado from 1979 to 1982 where he excelled at both baseball and basketball. He still holds career records at the school for RBI (173), home runs (47) and slugging percentage (.756). Keller is also in the program's top ten lists for career runs (146), total bases (332) and walks (86). He also holds the single season Bears record for home runs (20). In basketball, Keller was an All-North Central Conference selection in 1982 and led the team in scoring with a 15.1 points per game average. In 2006, he was inducted into the school's Athletic Hall of Fame.

In 1982, Keller was chosen in the 28th round of the 1982 draft by the Cincinnati Reds, and he played in their minor league system through the 1986 season.

== Coaching career ==
From 1987 to 1989, Keller was the manager for the Billings Mustangs of the rookie Pioneer League in the Reds organization. In 1990, Keller was hired by the Cleveland Indians to manage their farm team in Burlington, North Carolina. In 1991, his Burlington Indians qualified for the Appalachian League playoffs. For the 1992 season, Keller was moved up to the Class A Kinston Indians. He was the manager for the K-Tribe through the 1994 season and earned Carolina League manager of the year honors in 1993. Keller finished up his managerial career with a stint as the skipper for South Bend of the Midwest League for the Chicago White Sox.

In 1999, Keller was named the minor league hitting coordinator for the Cleveland Indians. In 2000 and 2001, he served as a hitting instructor in their system. He finally made it to the major leagues as a bullpen coach for Cleveland in 2002 and 2003.

From 2004-2012, Keller was the minor league hitting coordinator for the Chicago Cubs. For the 2013 season, he was promoted to manager of the Advanced-A affiliate Daytona Cubs where he led the team to a 75-51 record and won the Florida State League championship by defeating the Charlotte Stone Crabs 3-1. Keller led the club back to the Florida State League championship series in 2014, the team's final season in a 22-year run as a Cubs affiliate in Daytona Beach. Keller was a roving instructor and Latin American field coordinator for the Cubs' farm system from 2015 to 2024. He then moved to the Rockies' chain as bench coach of the Fresno Grizzlies in early 2025.
