= Orlando Phantoms =

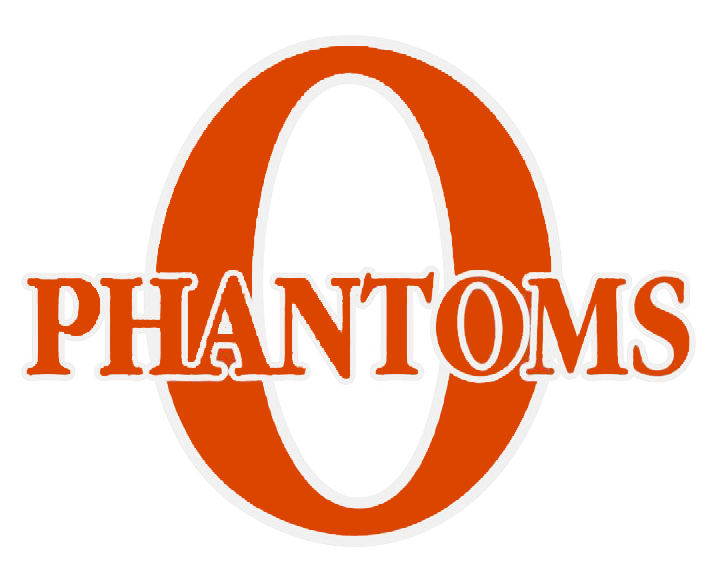
- Based in: Orlando, Florida
- Home stadium: Lake Brantley Stadium; Altamonte Springs, FL
- Head coach: Ron Scarlata
- League: Amateur to Professional Developmental Football League (APDFL)
- Colors: Orange, Grey, White
- Nickname(s): Grave Diggers

The Orlando Phantoms is an amateur outdoor football team in the state of Florida. Founded in 2010, they are a member of the APDFL (Amateur to Professional Developmental Football League). They are 7-time national bowl champions and 3-time league champions.

The Phantoms are a mixed-sex sports team. Former MLB pitcher Kyle Farnsworth has played for the Phantoms.

== National bowl championships won ==
- 2012, Orlando Phantoms (FL) 7 vs Lowell Nor'easter (MA) 0
- 2014, Orlando Phantoms (FL) 17 vs Richmond County Golden Bears (NC) 8
- 2015, Orlando Phantoms (FL) 17 vs Michigan Stealth (MI) 6
- 2016, Orlando Phantoms (FL) 28 vs Catawba Hornets (NC) 24
- 2017, Orlando Phantoms (FL) 30 vs Rutherford Co. Raiders (NC) 22
- 2018, Orlando Phantoms (FL) 19 vs Virginia Chargers (VA) 0
- 2020, Orlando Phantoms (FL) 18 vs Kentucky Spartans (KY) 12
