= Oscar Acosta (baseball) =

- Pitcher / Pitching coach
- Born: March 21, 1957; Portales, New Mexico
- Died: April 19, 2006 (aged 49); Santo Domingo, Dominican Republic
- Batted: Right Threw: Right
- Stats at Baseball Reference

Oscar Carlos Acosta (March 21, 1957 – April 19, 2006) was an American professional baseball player and pitching coach. After playing five seasons in the minor leagues, he became a minor league coach with several organizations. He had first joined the New York Yankees organization in 1996, spending three seasons as the pitching coach at Triple-A Columbus (1996–98). He spent three seasons as a major league pitching coach with the Chicago Cubs (2000-01) and the Texas Rangers (2002).

Acosta and another minor league coach were killed in an automobile accident while working for the Yankees in the Dominican Republic.

== Biography ==
Acosta was born on March 21, 1957, in Portales, New Mexico. He played in the minors from 1978 to 1982. He debuted with the Helena Phillies, going 0–1 with a 9.00 ERA in five appearances. In 1979, he pitched for the Peninsula Pilots and had a career year, with a 10–7, 3.04 season. He finished 9th in the Carolina League in ERA. Returning to Peninsula in 1980, he only pitched in 9 games, going 2–0 with a 3.55 ERA, 2 saves and a shutout. He resurfaced in the 1982 Mexican Baseball League, posting a 0–3, 6.75 record for the Plataneros de Tabasco to complete his career.

Acosta began coaching in the Texas Rangers organization with the Butte Copper Kings in 1988. He coached the Gastonia Rangers (1989), GCL Rangers (1990, 1993), Tulsa Drillers (1991) and Oklahoma City 89ers (1992). Moving to the Chicago Cubs' organization, he then coached the Daytona Cubs (1994) and GCL Cubs (1995). Next he coached the Columbus Clippers (1996–1998) for the New York Yankees. He managed the Cubs Class A Lansing Lugnuts in the Midwest League in 1999, and was then promoted to the major league level, serving as the pitching coach for the Chicago Cubs. Acosta was with the Cubs in 2000 and 2001; in his second year, the team's pitching staff reduced its ERA by more than a run and recorded a league-high strikeout total. However, Acosta did not get along well with manager Don Baylor; he resigned after the 2001 season and served as the pitching coach for the Texas Rangers in 2002.

Acosta served as international coordinator of instruction as well as manager of the Gulf Coast Yankees of the Yankees' Gulf Coast team in Tampa since 2004, guiding the team to the Gulf Coast League championship in his final two seasons. Acosta resided in Florida.

== Death ==
Acosta and a colleague, Humberto Trejo, were killed in an automobile accident on April 19, 2006, while working in the Dominican Republic with the New York Yankees minor league system. Acosta had a wife and three children.

His son, Ryan, was drafted by the Chicago Cubs in the 2007 amateur draft.
