= Richie Barker (baseball) =

American baseball player (born 1972)

- Pitcher
- Born: October 29, 1972 (age 53); Revere, Massachusetts, U.S.
- Batted: Right Threw: Right

MLB debut
- April 25, 1999, for the Chicago Cubs

Last MLB appearance
- May 5, 1999, for the Chicago Cubs

MLB statistics
- Win–loss record: 0–0
- Earned run average: 7.20
- Strikeouts: 3
- Stats at Baseball Reference

Teams
- Chicago Cubs (1999)

Richard Frank Barker (born October 29, 1972) is an American former right-handed relief pitcher in Major League Baseball for the Chicago Cubs. Barker's major league career consisted of just five games in the 1999 season.

== Career ==
Barker was drafted by the Cubs in the 37th round (1,030th overall) of the 1994 amateur draft out of Quinsigamond Community College. Only three other players drafted in that round made the majors-- Bronson Heflin, Matt Blank, and Mike Lincoln. Barker was one of only four Cubs draftees (out of 75) that year who eventually made the big leagues. The only player drafted later than Barker that year by the Cubs to make the leap was Kyle Farnsworth, a 47th round selection.

Barker made his debut with the Cubs on April 25, 1999, throwing 1 1/3 innings against the New York Mets and allowing one run on three hits. He'd make four more appearances in relief, including his final game on May 5, 1999. Barker's final statistics featured no wins, losses, or saves, an ERA of 7.20, four walks, and three strikeouts. After returning to the AAA Iowa Cubs after his cup of coffee with the parent club, Barker was unable to make it back to the majors. He pitched just 20 games in the minors in 2000 before he then retired from baseball due to an injury and moved to a suburb of Phoenix, Arizona, where he married and started a small sports business.
