= Matt Craig (baseball) =

Chicago Cubs – No. –
- First baseman / Third baseman
- Born: April 16, 1981 (age 45); Dallas, Texas, U.S.
- Bats: Right Throws: Right

Matthew James Craig (born April 16, 1981) is an American Minor League Baseball first baseman and third baseman with the Florida Marlins organization. He was drafted by the Chicago Cubs in 2002 in the third round after playing three years for the University of Richmond Spiders. Craig's description of himself is a "switch hitter ... that can play first and third, and can hit for a good average and [has] some power."

== Biography ==
A six-foot three-inch two hundred pound corner infielder, Craig was born in Dallas, Texas and attended Trinity Christian Academy in Addison, Texas. He is a switch-hitter, and throws right-handed. At the end of the 2008 season, the 27-year-old Craig had only had brief stints at the Triple-A level, never appearing on a 40-man roster with four years of play at the Double-A level.

== Career ==
Craig played for three seasons at Richmond, batting .375 with 19 home runs and 84 RBIs in just 66 games in 2002. After being drafted by the Cubs, he was assigned to the Boise Hawks, one of the single A affiliates of the Cubs. He moved up the Cubs minor league system, playing for the Daytona Cubs and the West Tenn Diamond Jaxx during the 2003–07 seasons, and was promoted to the Iowa Cubs on July 25, 2007, based on his strong performance with the Smokies including a .514 slugging percentage.

Craig was one of seven Cubs minor league players who were suspended for 15 games at the beginning of the 2005 season for testing positive for a banned substance. Craig appealed his suspension, but it was not overturned despite third-party drug tests coming back negative. As a result of this experience, Craig has taken considerable steps to clear his name by voluntarily taking drug tests. Since the 2005 suspensions, the Cubs organization has had no players given a suspension as a result of intentional work to educate the players and raise their awareness of possible banned substances.

Following strong performance with West Tennessee in 2005, the Cubs recognizing their depth in Craig's primary positions of first and third base, decided to retrain him as a catcher and sent him back to Daytona where he never suited up behind the plate. Craig was named PCL Batter of the Week for the week of August 6–12, for a week which included an average of .522, nine RBIs, 2 home runs and a slugging percentage of .957 and to the All Star Game. Craig spent the 2008 season with the Tennessee Smokies and Iowa Cubs, including time spent on the DL list. Craig spent most of 2008 Minor League camp with the Iowa AAA franchise, but received a call from the Cubs' vice president for player personnel, Oneri Fleita, at the end of camp informing him that he was going back to the Smokies, but after batting .352 as of June 1, was promoted to the AAA [Iowa Cubs] where he primarily served as a pinch hitter batting .276 over 36 games.

Craig became a free agent at the end of the 2008 season. While Craig has indicated that he'd like to stay with the Cubs, he has spent what has been described as "an eternity in the minors" as part of the Cubs franchise over the last six years despite strong stats, including a career batting average over .280, and outperforming other players. Scouts and sports commentators have noted Craig's versatility as a fielder, playing first base, third base and occasionally shortstop as well as his consistent offensive performance making Craig likely to be signed by another club. Despite being described as the headliner of the Cubs' free agents, it is unlikely that the Cubs will resign him due to their depth at his positions.
