= Cole Liniak =

American baseball player (born 1976)

- Third baseman
- Born: August 23, 1976 (age 49); Encinitas, California, U.S.
- Batted: Right Threw: Right

MLB debut
- September 3, 1999, for the Chicago Cubs

Last MLB appearance
- April 5, 2000, for the Chicago Cubs

MLB statistics
- Batting average: .219
- Hits: 7
- Runs batted in: 2
- Stats at Baseball Reference

Teams
- Chicago Cubs (1999–2000)

Cole Edward Liniak (born August 23, 1976) is an American former Major League Baseball player who played infield from 1999-2000 for the Chicago Cubs. Liniak is most known in sports circles as the man the Cubs acquired for relief pitcher Rod Beck in 1999.
