= Sandy Martínez =

Dominican baseball player (born 1970)

Sandy Martinez
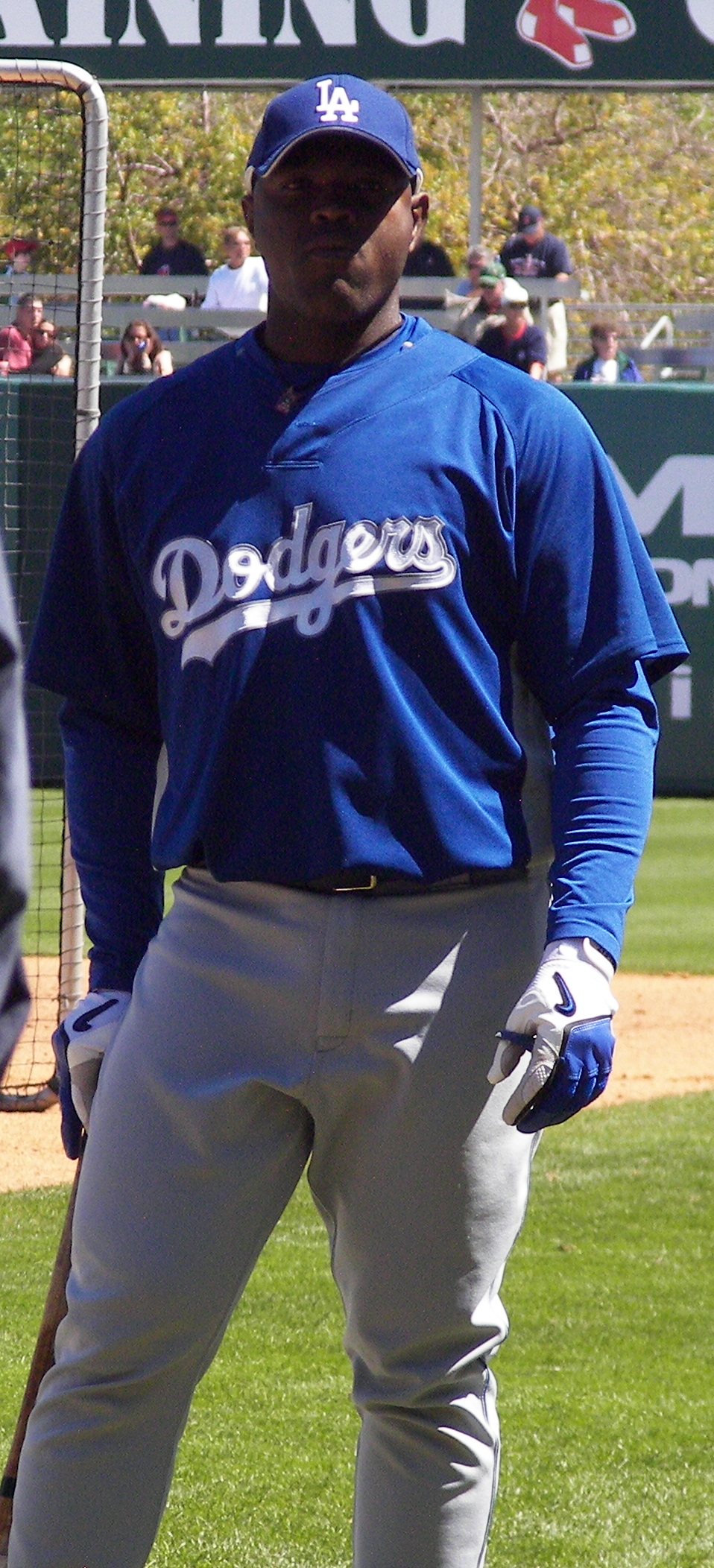
- Martinez with the Los Angeles Dodgers in 2007
- Catcher
- Born: October 8, 1970 (age 55); Villa Mella, Dominican Republic
- Batted: Left Threw: Right

MLB debut
- June 24, 1995, for the Toronto Blue Jays

Last MLB appearance
- October 3, 2004, for the Boston Red Sox

MLB statistics
- Batting average: .230
- Home runs: 6
- Runs batted in: 51
- Stats at Baseball Reference

Teams
- Toronto Blue Jays (1995–1997); Chicago Cubs (1998–1999); Florida Marlins (2000); Montreal Expos (2001); Cleveland Indians (2004); Boston Red Sox (2004)

Angel Sandy Martínez Martínez (born October 8, 1970) is a Dominican former professional baseball player, and current Manager for the DSL Nationals. He played as a catcher in Major League Baseball for the Toronto Blue Jays (1995-1997), Chicago Cubs (1998-1999), Florida Marlins (2000), Montreal Expos (2001), Cleveland Indians (2004), and Boston Red Sox (2004). He bats left-handed and throws right-handed.

== Baseball career ==
Martínez was signed by the Toronto Blue Jays as an amateur free agent in 1990 and made his Major League Baseball debut at the age of 24 on June 24, 1995. He was traded to the Chicago Cubs on December 11, 1997, for minor leaguer Trevor Schaffer. Martínez was the battery-mate for Cubs pitcher Kerry Wood on May 6, 1998, when Wood struck out 20 batters to tie Roger Clemens for the major league single-game strikeout record in a 9 inning game. He posted a career-high batting average of .264 and made the only post-season appearance of his career where, he had one hit in one at bat and scored a run in Game 3 of the 1998 National League Division Series.

Martínez became a free agent after the 1999 season and signed with the Florida Marlins on December 6, 1999. A free agent at the end of the 2000 season, Martínez signed with the Montreal Expos on November 17, 2000. Martínez played one game for the Expos in 2001 and played for their Triple-A affiliate, the Ottawa Lynx, in 2002. For the 2003 season, Martínez signed with the Tampa Bay Devil Rays, but was released in spring training.

On April 8, 2003, he signed with the Kansas City Royals and played for their Triple-A affiliate, the Omaha Royals. After being released on June 8, 2003, Martínez signed with the Pittsburgh Pirates on January 20, 2004, but before playing a game for the Pirates, Martínez was traded to the Indians. He spent most of the season with Cleveland's Triple-A affiliate, the Buffalo Bisons, playing one game for the Indians major league team. On August 31, 2004, Martínez's contract was purchased by the Boston Red Sox, where he played three games before being granted free agency at the end of the season. He played in his final major league game on October 3, 2004, at the age of 33.

On January 15, 2005, he signed with the Detroit Tigers, playing 81 games for their Triple-A affiliate, the Toledo Mud Hens. On December 14, 2005, Martínez signed a minor league contract with the New York Mets, playing 85 games for their Triple-A affiliate, the Norfolk Tides, and becoming a free agent at the end of the season. On November 16, 2006, Martínez signed a minor league contract with the Los Angeles Dodgers, but did not play in any games for their organization before being released and signed by the Florida Marlins. Martínez played three games for their Triple-A affiliate, the Albuquerque Isotopes, and became a free agent at the end of the 2007 season.

== Career statistics ==
In an eight-year major league career, Martínez played in 218 games, accumulating 130 hits in 564 at bats for a .230 career batting average along with 6 home runs, 51 runs batted in and a .284 on-base percentage. He ended his career with a .988 fielding percentage.

== Managerial career ==
Martinez managed the Washington Nationals' affiliate in the Dominican Summer League during the 2010 season and was re-appointed manager of the DSL Nationals for 2011, and has managed the team since then, currently through 2023.

== Personal life ==
His son, Ángel Martinez, is also a professional baseball player, and has played for the Cleveland Guardians since 2024.
