= Rod Beck =

American baseball player (1968–2007)

- Pitcher
- Born: August 3, 1968; Burbank, California, U.S.
- Died: June 23, 2007 (aged 38); Phoenix, Arizona, U.S.
- Batted: Right Threw: Right

MLB debut
- May 6, 1991, for the San Francisco Giants

Last MLB appearance
- August 14, 2004, for the San Diego Padres

MLB statistics
- Win–loss record: 38–45
- Earned run average: 3.30
- Strikeouts: 644
- Saves: 286
- Stats at Baseball Reference

Teams
- San Francisco Giants (1991–1997); Chicago Cubs (1998–1999); Boston Red Sox (1999–2001); San Diego Padres (2003–2004)

Career highlights and awards
- 3× All-Star (1993, 1994, 1997); NL Rolaids Relief Man Award (1994); San Francisco Giants Wall of Fame

Rodney Roy Beck (August 3, 1968 – June 23, 2007), nicknamed "Shooter", was an American professional baseball relief pitcher in Major League Baseball who played for the San Francisco Giants (1991–1997), Chicago Cubs (1998–1999), Boston Red Sox (1999–2001) and San Diego Padres (2003–2004). He batted and threw right-handed.

== Early life ==
Rodney Roy Beck was born on August 3, 1968, in Burbank, California.

== Professional career ==
=== Draft and minor leagues ===
The Oakland Athletics drafted Beck as a starting pitcher in the 13th round (327th pick) of the 1986 Major League Baseball draft. Prior to the 1988 season, he was traded to the San Francisco Giants organization. In 1989, while with the San Jose Giants of the California League, he posted a record of 11–2 between opening day and June 14, when he was promoted to the Shreveport Captains of the Double A Texas League.

=== San Francisco Giants (1991–1997) ===
Beck made his Major League debut on May 6, 1991, against the Montreal Expos. His performance was forgettable (2.0 IP, 3 H, 2 ER), but his season numbers were more impressive. He had a 3.78 ERA, pitched 52 1/3 innings in 31 games, and struck out 38 while walking 13. In 1992, Beck took over as the regular closer from Dave Righetti and posted a record of 3–3 with 17 saves and a 1.76 ERA. He pitched 92 innings over 65 games and struck out 87 while walking only 15. In 1993 he recorded 48 saves, including 24 consecutive. At the time, both marks were Giants franchise records. Beck found success using a sinker, slider, and splitter.

=== Chicago Cubs (1998–1999) ===
After the 1997 season, the Giants felt Beck's best years were behind him, and allowed him to leave as a free agent to sign with the Chicago Cubs, replacing him with Robb Nen. Beck set a career high in saves in 1998, his first season with the Cubs, converting 51 of 58 chances.

=== Boston Red Sox (1999–2001) ===
However, in the 1999 season, Beck battled injury, and was traded by Chicago to the Boston Red Sox in exchange for reliever Mark Guthrie and a player to be named later, who turned out to be Cole Liniak.

Beck pitched well for the surging Red Sox, although he struggled in the postseason, giving up a Bernie Williams walk-off home run in Game One of the 1999 ALCS. Beck was not as good in his two full seasons with the team as he had been in the past. After the 2001 season, Beck had Tommy John surgery and missed the 2002 season.

=== Chicago Cubs ===
Beck successfully recovered from Tommy John surgery and, as a free agent, was signed by the Cubs in January 2003. While pitching for the team's AAA affiliate Iowa Cubs during his comeback, Beck gained national attention for living in a motor home behind the team's Sec Taylor Stadium (now Principal Park) in Des Moines. Beck warmly welcomed fans to drop by and visit, signed autographs and offered free beer. This time he did not play in the majors for the Cubs, and they released him in May 2003.

=== San Diego Padres (2003–2004) ===
Immediately after leaving the Cubs in 2003, Beck returned to the Major Leagues with the Padres to fill in for the injured Trevor Hoffman. He converted 20 saves in 20 chances, while posting a 1.78 ERA. His statistics earned him the National League Comeback Player of the Year award. In 2004, Beck dealt with personal problems during Spring Training and struggled in a seventh inning role for the Padres. Beck was released by San Diego in August.

== Death ==
On June 23, 2007, Beck died at his home in Phoenix, Arizona. The Maricopa County medical examiner did not publicly disclose the cause of death and the Phoenix police did not suspect foul play. Beck's ex-wife stated she believed his death to be drug-related. Cocaine and heroin were found in his home and bedroom.

Beck was buried in Phoenix wearing his Chicago Cubs uniform. He was added to the 2008 ballot for the Baseball Hall of Fame, earlier than the typical retirement rule due to his death, and received two votes.
