= Roosevelt Brown (baseball) =

American baseball player (born 1975)

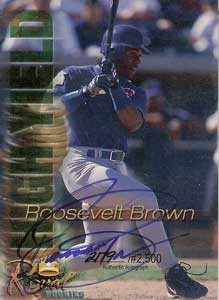
- Outfielder
- Born: August 3, 1975 (age 50); Vicksburg, Mississippi, U.S.
- Batted: Left Threw: Right

Professional debut
- MLB: May 18, 1999, for the Chicago Cubs
- NPB: March 28, 2003, for the Orix BlueWave

Last appearance
- MLB: September 29, 2002, for the Chicago Cubs
- NPB: August 3, 2004, for the Orix BlueWave

MLB statistics
- Batting average: .251
- Home runs: 11
- Runs batted in: 69

NPB statistics
- Batting average: .291
- Home runs: 43
- Runs batted in: 163
- Stats at Baseball Reference

Teams
- Chicago Cubs (1999–2002); Orix BlueWave (2003–2004)

Roosevelt Lawayne Brown (born August 3, 1975) is an American former professional baseball player who played outfield in Major League Baseball from 1999 to 2002. Drafted out of high school by the Atlanta Braves in 1993, Brown was traded from the Braves to the Florida Marlins in exchange for Terry Pendleton on August 13, 1996. He later played for the Chicago Cubs and then the Orix BlueWave in Japan. Brown ended his career after a season playing for the Charlotte Knights, the Triple-A affiliate of the Chicago White Sox, in 2005. His cousin is ex-Boston Red Sox outfielder, Ellis Burks.

Since retiring, Brown has been hitting coach for the Mississippi Braves, the Sioux Falls Canaries, and the Mahoning Valley Scrappers.
