= Matt Karchner =

American baseball player (born 1967)

- Pitcher
- Born: June 28, 1967 (age 59); Berwick, Pennsylvania, U.S.
- Batted: Right Threw: Right

MLB debut
- July 18, 1995, for the Chicago White Sox

Last MLB appearance
- June 14, 2000, for the Chicago Cubs

MLB statistics
- Win–loss record: 21–13
- Earned run average: 4.21
- Strikeouts: 166
- Saves: 27
- Stats at Baseball Reference

Teams
- Chicago White Sox (1995–1998); Chicago Cubs (1998–2000)

Matthew Dean Karchner (born June 28, 1967) is an American former professional baseball player who was a pitcher in the Major Leagues from 1995 to 2000.

== Playing career ==
Karchner graduated from Berwick High School in Berwick, Pennsylvania in 1985. He played college baseball as a third baseman at Bloomsburg University and led NCAA Division II with 1.59 runs batted in per game in 1988.

The following year, he was selected in the eighth round of the 1989 Major League Baseball draft by the Kansas City Royals. He was converted to pitching and was assigned to the Eugene Emeralds of the Northwest League to begin his professional career.

After three seasons in the Royals' farm system, Karchner was selected in the 1991 Rule 5 draft by the Montreal Expos. He signed a one-year contract with the Expos in January 1992 but was returned to the Royals that April.

Karchner spent two more seasons in the Royals' farm system before being selected by the Chicago White Sox in the minor league phase of the 1993 Rule 5 draft. To begin the 1994 season, Karchner was assigned to the Birmingham Barons where he played with Michael Jordan. Karchner made his Major League debut on July 18, 1995 at Yankee Stadium and pitched a scoreless inning in relief of Kirk McCaskill. Karchner was a regular in the White Sox bullpen for the remainder of that season as well as the following two seasons. Between 1997 and 1998, he set a franchise record by converting 20 consecutive save opportunities.

On July 29, 1998, Karchner was traded to the Chicago Cubs for Jon Garland who was then 18 years old and struggling in the minor leagues. The move was widely criticized by prospect experts at the time and was later described in the Chicago Tribune as "one of the most lopsided in [Cubs] franchise history" and in The Athletic as the "greatest White Sox trade ever." Karchner struggled in his debut season with the Cubs but was brought back the following year nonetheless. In 1999, he missed substantial time due to groin injuries. By 2000, Karchner's attitude had soured and manager Don Baylor chose to keep him in the minors with the Iowa Cubs due, according to Karchner, to his negative attitude. The Cubs released him in September 2000. Needing offseason shoulder surgery and facing free agency, Karchner chose to retire.

Karchner later told Mitchell Report investigators that, during spring training in 1999, he was present when two of his Cubs teammates injected each other with steroids in their shared apartment. He further reported that he had been offered steroids but declined to use them.

== Coaching career ==
In January 2004, Karchner was named the interim head baseball coach at Susquehanna University. He resigned that position in June 2005.

== Personal life ==
Karchner is married and has one daughter, born April 1, 1994. By the time his playing career ended, he had multiple children.
