= Kyle Farnsworth =

American baseball player (born 1976)

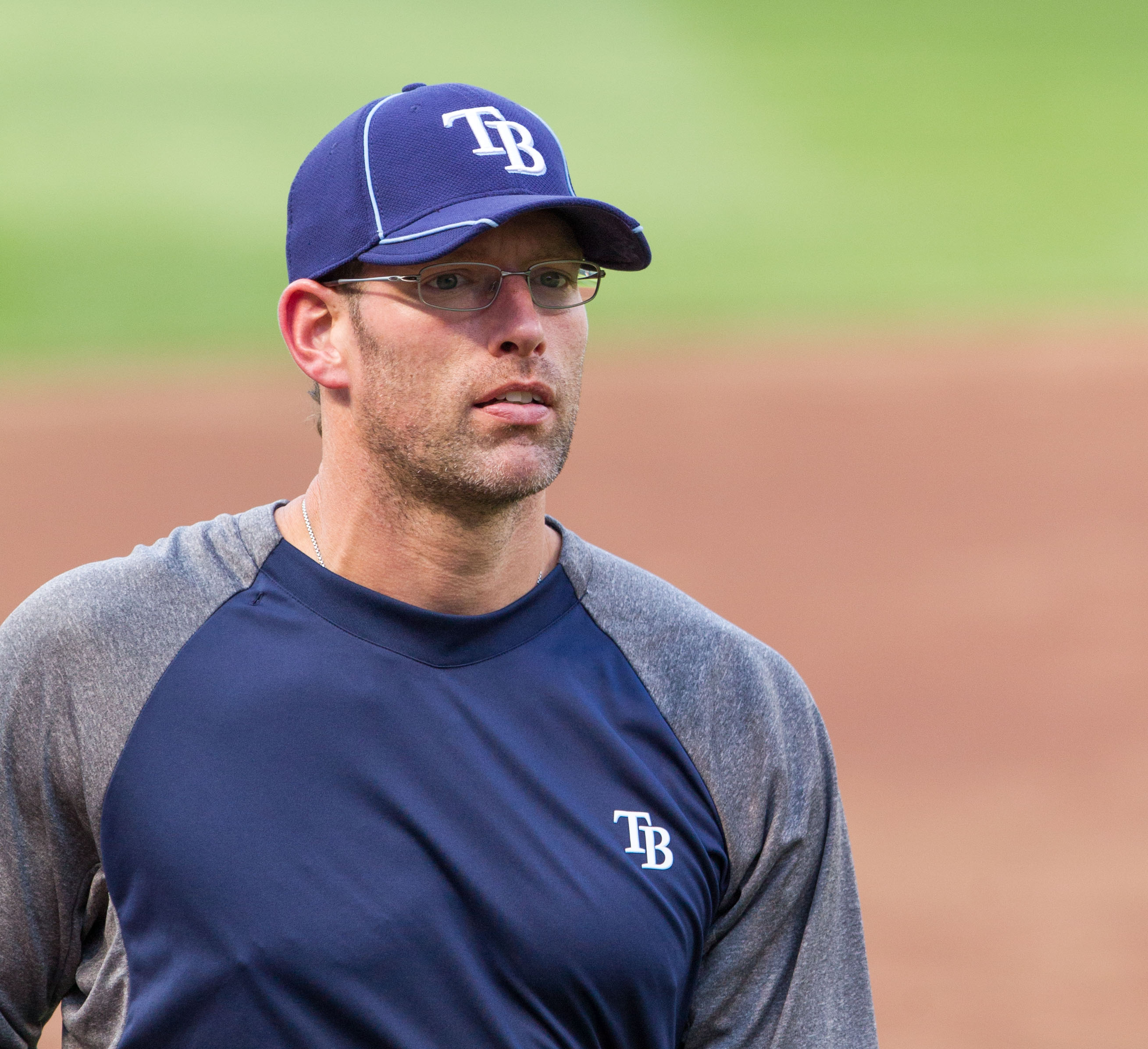
- Farnsworth with the Tampa Bay Rays in 2012
- Pitcher
- Born: April 14, 1976 (age 50); Wichita, Kansas, U.S.
- Batted: Right Threw: Right

MLB debut
- April 29, 1999, for the Chicago Cubs

Last MLB appearance
- June 25, 2014, for the Houston Astros

MLB statistics
- Win–loss record: 43–66
- Earned run average: 4.26
- Strikeouts: 963
- Stats at Baseball Reference

Teams
- Chicago Cubs (1999–2004); Detroit Tigers (2005); Atlanta Braves (2005); New York Yankees (2006–2008); Detroit Tigers (2008); Kansas City Royals (2009–2010); Atlanta Braves (2010); Tampa Bay Rays (2011–2013); Pittsburgh Pirates (2013); New York Mets (2014); Houston Astros (2014)

Kyle Lynn Farnsworth (born April 14, 1976) is an American former professional baseball pitcher. He played for the Chicago Cubs (1999–2004), Detroit Tigers (2005, 2008), Atlanta Braves (2005, 2010), New York Yankees (2006–2008), Kansas City Royals (2009–2010), Tampa Bay Rays (2011–2013), Pittsburgh Pirates (2013), New York Mets (2014), Houston Astros (2014) in Major League Baseball, and for the Pericos de Puebla (2015) and the Broncos de Reynosa (2016) of the Mexican League. In 2017, Farnsworth was the pitching coach for the Brookhaven Bucks of the Sunbelt Baseball League.

== High school and college ==
Farnsworth graduated from Milton High School in Alpharetta, Georgia, in 1994. During high school, he played baseball, basketball, and football. He continued to play baseball in college at Abraham Baldwin Agricultural College (ABAC) in Tifton, Georgia. Kyle was inducted into the ABAC Athletics Hall of Fame in 2011.

== Professional baseball career ==
=== Chicago Cubs ===
Farnsworth was drafted in the 47th round (1,290th overall) by the Chicago Cubs in 1994. He did not sign until May 12, 1995, after playing briefly at Abraham Baldwin Agricultural College. He played for the Cubs from 1999 to 2004. He was the winning pitcher in the final baseball game played at Three Rivers Stadium on October 1, 2000. Farnsworth was involved in a brawl in the 2003 season, against the Cincinnati Reds. Reds pitcher Paul Wilson stepped out of the batter's box after an inside pitch, and started to yell at Farnsworth. Farnsworth then met Wilson a short distance from home plate, and speared him to the ground. He was suspended three games for his actions, but MLB reduced the suspension to two games.

In the 2004 season, Farnsworth angrily kicked an electric fan in the Cubs' dugout after an outing in which he gave up six runs in one inning to the Houston Astros. Farnsworth ended up severely bruising and spraining his knee in the process, and was placed on the disabled list as a result.

=== First stint with the Detroit Tigers ===
On February 9, 2005, he was traded to the Detroit Tigers for Roberto Novoa, Scott Moore and Bo Flowers. Farnsworth was involved in a bench-clearing fight in the 2005 season while playing for the Detroit Tigers, against the Kansas City Royals at Comerica Park. After order appeared to have been restored, Farnsworth tackled Royals pitcher Jeremy Affeldt. Farnsworth was ejected from the game.

=== First stint with the Atlanta Braves ===
On July 31, 2005, he was traded to the Atlanta Braves for pitchers Zach Miner and Román Colón.

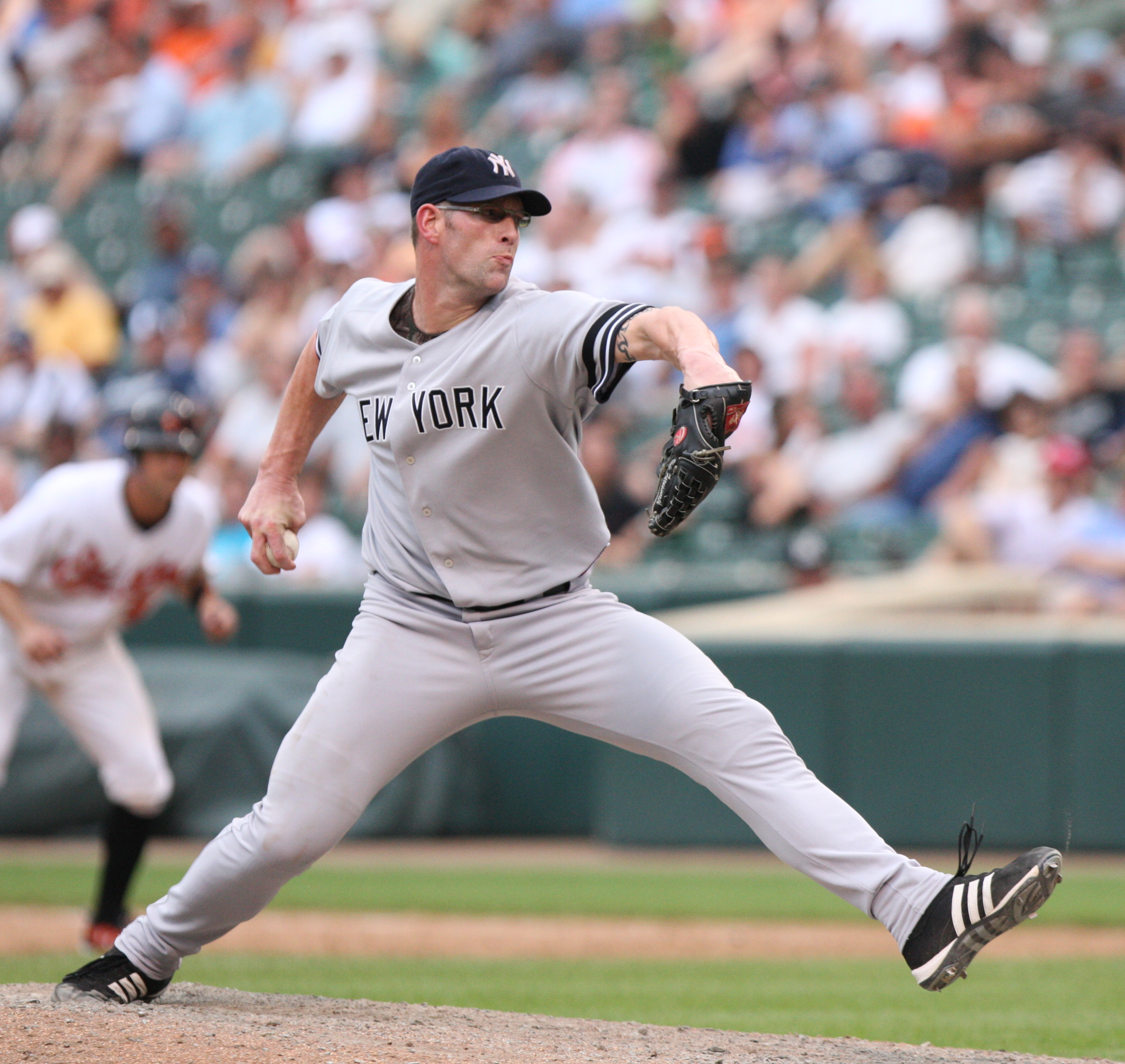
Farnsworth pitching for the New York Yankees in 2007.

=== New York Yankees ===
Following the season, Farnsworth signed with the New York Yankees, replacing Tom Gordon as the team's primary set-up man. The deal, worth $17 million over three years, was the second-highest offer Farnsworth received. The Texas Rangers reportedly offered a three-year, $16.5 million contract with a vesting option that would have taken the deal to $21 million, plus incentives.

He struggled in the 2006 season, accumulating a 4.36 ERA in 72 games. His struggles continued into the 2007 season, as he recorded a 4.80 ERA in 64 relief appearances.

=== Second stint with the Tigers ===
On July 30, 2008, Farnsworth returned to the Tigers in a trade for Iván Rodríguez. He became a free agent following the season.

=== Kansas City Royals ===
On December 13, 2008, the Royals reached an agreement with Farnsworth on a two-year, $9.25 million deal. On June 17, 2009, Farnsworth's left, non-pitching hand was bitten while he was breaking up a fight between two of his American bulldogs—Strike and Rambo. The cuts were deep enough to reach, but not cut, a tendon. Farnsworth later taped his finger, tucked it into his glove, and went to practice telling manager Trey Hillman that he could pitch. When asked which of his dogs bit him, Farnsworth replied: "I don't know. I reached in there and started grabbing dogs and throwing dogs. And one of them got me. One of those things that happens. It's never pretty. I've had to do it a few times, and it's ugly."

=== Second stint with the Braves ===
On July 31, 2010, Farnsworth was re-acquired by the Braves along with Rick Ankiel for Gregor Blanco, Jesse Chavez and Tim Collins.

=== Tampa Bay Rays ===
On January 15, 2011, Farnsworth agreed to a one-year, $3.25 million deal with the Tampa Bay Rays. The deal included a club option for the 2012 season. For 2011 Farnsworth posted a record of 5-1 with 25 saves as Tampa Bay's closer and a career-low 2.18 ERA in 63 relief appearances. On October 31, 2011, the Rays exercised Farnsworth's option for the 2012 season. On February 5, 2013, Farnsworth signed a one-year contract worth $1.25 million. Unlike his first two years with the Rays, Farnsworth was ineffective in 2013, and was designated for assignment and then released in August 2013, just before another economic incentive would kick in.

=== Pittsburgh Pirates ===
On August 16, 2013, Farnsworth signed a minor league contract with the Pittsburgh Pirates, He had his contract selected to the major league roster on September 1. He recorded his first Pirates save against the Texas Rangers on September 11, 2013. He became a free agent following the season.

=== New York Mets ===
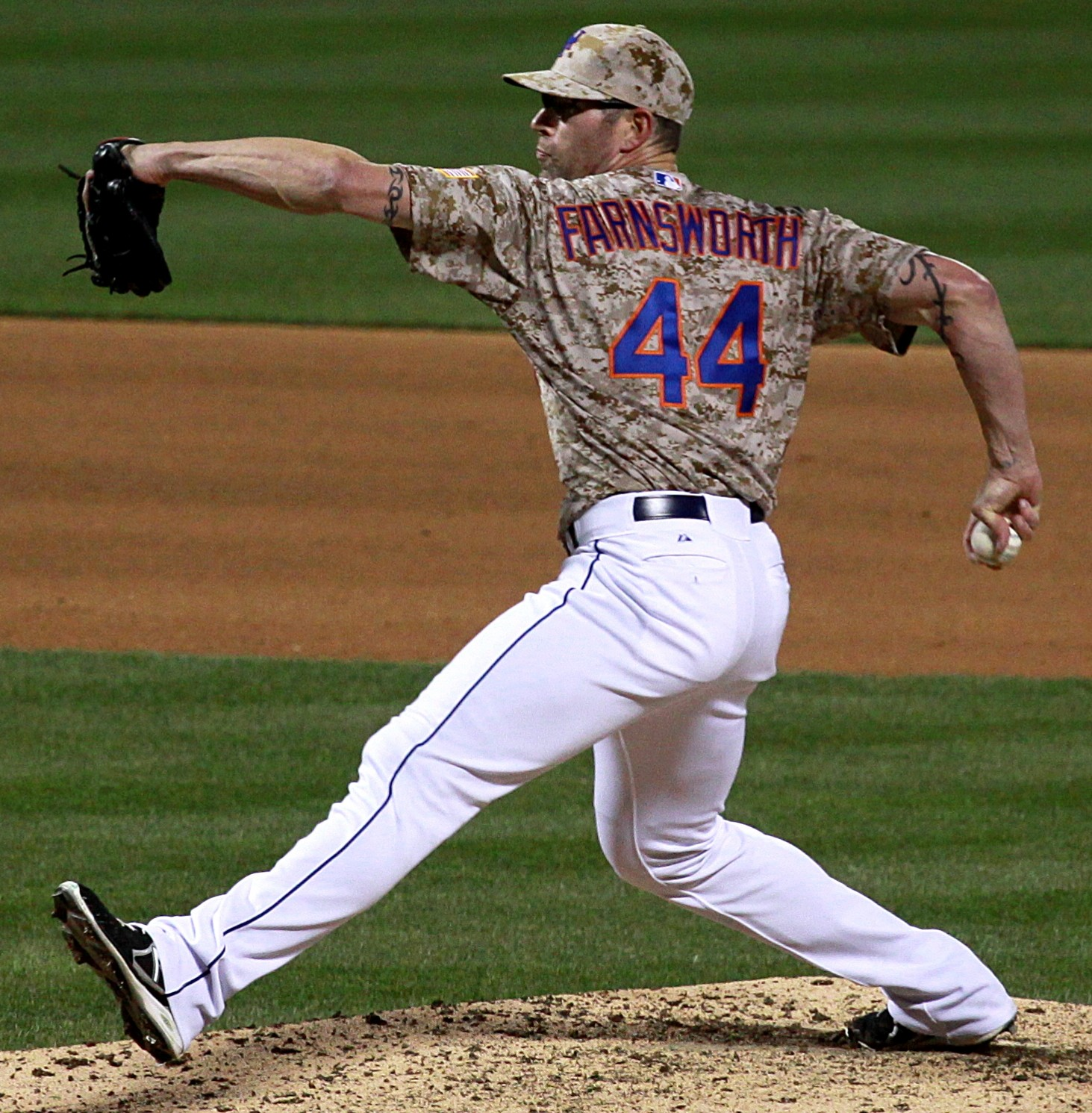
Farnsworth pitching for the Mets on April 21, 2014.

On February 3, 2014, Farnsworth signed a minor league contract with the New York Mets. He was released on March 23. On March 26 the Mets re-signed Farnsworth to a minor league contract. He was called up to the majors on April 2 to replace the injured Bobby Parnell.

On April 20, Farnsworth was named the new Mets closer after another blown save by Parnell's replacement, José Valverde. Farnsworth earned his first save as closer the next day in a 2–0 shutout of the St. Louis Cardinals. Farnsworth earned his second save as Mets closer three days later on April 23, giving up a run on three hits but managing to hang on for a 3–2 win over the Cardinals. The next day on April 24, Farnsworth was passed up for a save opportunity in favor of Daisuke Matsuzaka. However, after the game, Mets manager Terry Collins stated that Farnsworth was still the closer and that the Matsuzaka was the backup option. On April 26, Farnsworth gave up a 10th inning home run to Miami Marlins catcher Jarrod Saltalamacchia, allowing Miami to go on to win 7–6, and earning Farnsworth the loss. On May 3 in a game against the Colorado Rockies, Farnsworth gave up a walk off two-run home run to pinch hitter Charlie Culberson, earning Farnsworth a blown save and his second loss of the season. On May 10, Farnsworth earned his third loss of the season, giving up a go-ahead single to Ryan Howard, which resulted to a 5–4 loss to the Philadelphia Phillies. Farnsworth rebounded on May 12, getting his third save of the season in the opening game of the Subway Series against cross town rivals the New York Yankees. This was Farnsworth's last appearance as a member of the Mets.

On May 14, the Mets outrighted Farnsworth to Triple-A to avoid guaranteeing him a full season's contract. In 19 games with the Mets, he had recorded a 3.18 ERA and three saves in four chances. Farnsworth stated that he would refuse the assignment and wanted to find a new team that would allow him to "play against this team." The next day on May 15, Farnsworth officially elected free agency.

=== Houston Astros ===
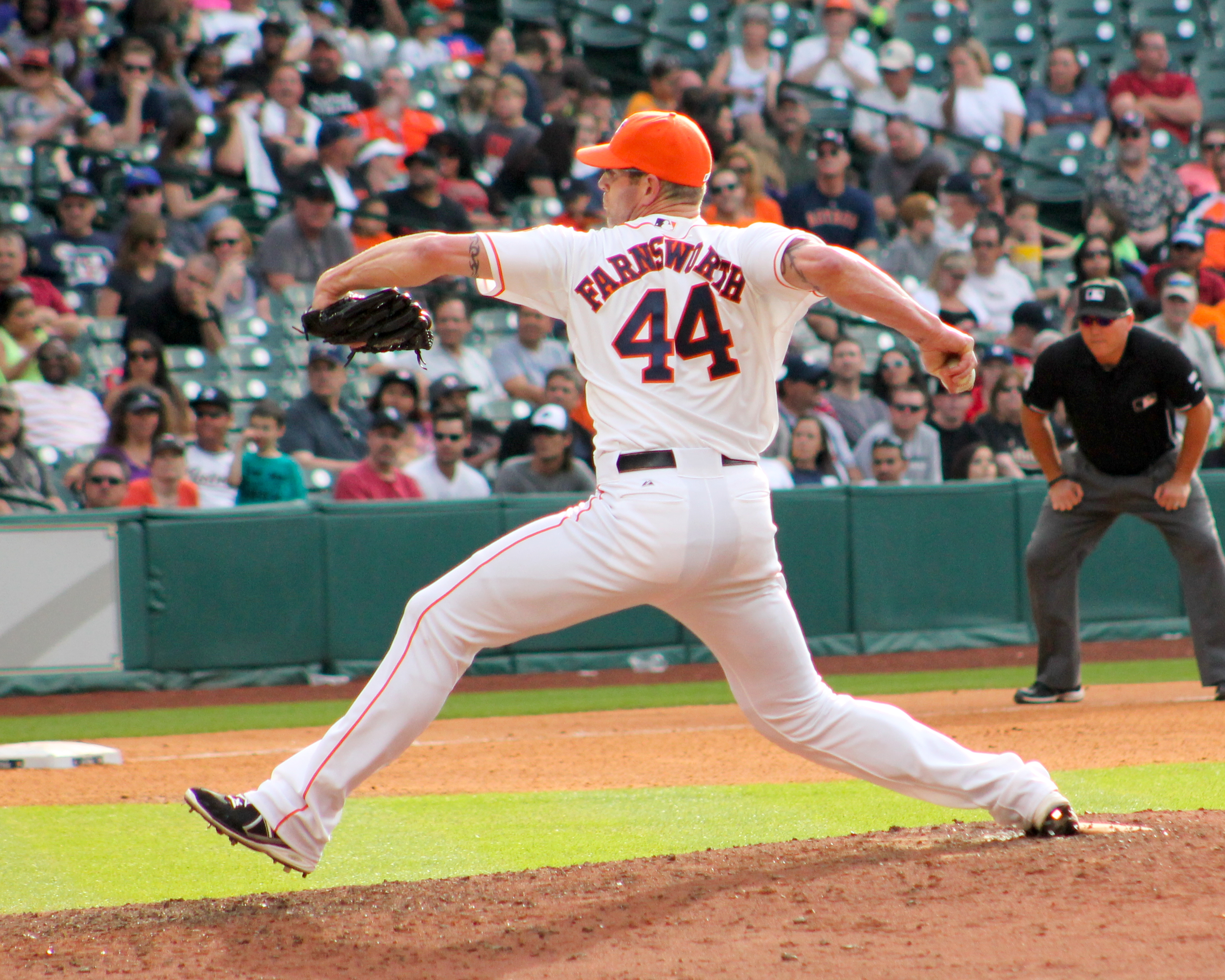
Farnsworth with the Astros in 2014

On May 17, 2014, Farnsworth signed a major league deal with the Houston Astros. He was outrighted off the roster on June 26 and elected to become a free agent. At the time, Farnsworth had a 6.17 ERA in 11.2 innings pitched with the Astros.

=== Pericos de Puebla ===
On July 2, 2015, Farnsworth signed with the Pericos de Puebla of the Mexican League. He became a free agent following the season. He appeared in 17 games 17.2 innings of relief going 1-0 with a 2.04 ERA and 12 strikeouts.

=== Broncos de Reynosa ===
On April 9, 2016, Farnsworth signed with the Broncos de Reynosa of the Mexican League. He was released on April 2, 2017. He appeared in 18 games (5 starts) throwing 39 innings going 1-3 with a 6.92 ERA with 11 strikeouts and 2 saves.

== Post-baseball career ==
Football

In August 2014, after being cut by the Houston Astros, Farnsworth tried out for the Orlando Phantoms, an amateur football team in the Florida Football Alliance. He had not played football since he was a freshman in high school in 1992. Farnsworth made the Phantoms and played defensive end in the 2015 season. He finished the season with 11 sacks.

Farnsworth played for the Phantoms again in 2016. He also claimed to have received an offer to play professionally in a football league in Australia before the league canceled its inaugural season. In 2017, Farnsworth was again a major part of Orlando's defense.

=== Bodybuilding ===
Farnsworth competed in the 2022 National Physique Committee Southern USA Championships in Orlando. He placed first in three categories.
