= 1997 Cleveland Indians season =

1997 Cleveland Indians
- American League champions American League Central champions
- League: American League
- Division: Central
- Ballpark: Jacobs Field
- City: Cleveland, Ohio
- Record: 86–75 (.534)
- Divisional place: 1st
- Owners: Richard Jacobs
- General managers: John Hart
- Managers: Mike Hargrove
- Television: WUAB; Jack Corrigan, Mike Hegan; SportsChannel; John Sanders, Rick Manning
- Radio: WKNR (1220 AM); Herb Score, Tom Hamilton, Matt Underwood

The 1997 Cleveland Indians season was the 97th season for the franchise and the 4th season at Jacobs Field. It involved the Indians making their second World Series appearance in three years, in which they'd lose to a National League East team again, this time to the wild card Florida Marlins in 7 games. The Indians finished in first place in the American League Central Division and hosted the 1997 Major League Baseball All-Star Game.

== Offseason ==
- November 13, 1996: Matt Williams was traded by the San Francisco Giants with a player to be named later to the Cleveland Indians for a player to be named later, Jeff Kent, Julián Tavárez, and José Vizcaíno. The Cleveland Indians sent Joe Roa (December 16, 1996) to the San Francisco Giants to complete the trade.
- December 10, 1996: Eric Plunk was signed as a free agent with the Cleveland Indians.
- December 13, 1996: Kevin Mitchell signed as a free agent with the Cleveland Indians.
- December 16, 1996: Trenidad Hubbard was sent by the San Francisco Giants to the Cleveland Indians to complete an earlier deal made on November 13, 1996.
- December 18, 1996: Chad Curtis was signed as a free agent with the Cleveland Indians.
- December 19, 1996: Les Norman was signed as a free agent with the Cleveland Indians.
- December 28, 1996: Tony Fernandez was signed as a free agent with the Cleveland Indians.
- January 1, 1997: Casey Candaele was signed as a free agent with the Cleveland Indians.
- January 31, 1997: Greg Cadaret was signed as a free agent with the Cleveland Indians.

== Regular season ==
- The season started with several new faces. The Indians acquired home run hitter Matt Williams. On March 25, 1997, the club traded All-Star Kenny Lofton and pitcher Alan Embree to the Atlanta Braves for Marquis Grissom and David Justice.
- June 16 – The first interleague game between the Cincinnati Reds and the Cleveland Indians took place at Jacobs Field. The rivalry would be known as the Battle of Ohio. The Reds won the game by a score of 4–1.

=== Most Starts by Position ===
Position	Name	# of Starts
C	Sandy Alomar Jr.	119
1B	Jim Thome	145
2B	Tony Fernández	109
3B	Matt Williams	151
SS	Omar Vizquel	152
LF	Brian Giles	82
CF	Marquis Grissom	144
RF	Manny Ramírez	146
DH	David Justice	61

=== Season standings ===
AL Central
Team	W	L	Pct.	GB	Home	Road
Cleveland Indians	86	75	.534	—	44‍–‍37	42‍–‍38
Chicago White Sox	80	81	.497	6	45‍–‍36	35‍–‍45
Milwaukee Brewers	78	83	.484	8	47‍–‍33	31‍–‍50
Minnesota Twins	68	94	.420	18½	35‍–‍46	33‍–‍48
Kansas City Royals	67	94	.416	19	33‍–‍47	34‍–‍47

=== Record vs. opponents ===
1997 American League record Source: MLB Standings Grid – 1997
Team	ANA	BAL	BOS	CWS	CLE	DET	KC	MIL	MIN	NYY	OAK	SEA	TEX	TOR	NL
Anaheim	—	4–7	6–5	6–5	7–4	5–6	6–5	7–4	4–7	4–7	11–1	6–6	8–4	6–5	4–12
Baltimore	7–4	—	5–7	5–6	6–5	6–6	7–4	5–6	10–1	8–4	8–3	7–4	10–1	6–6	8–7
Boston	5–6	7–5	—	3–8	6–5	5–7	3–8	8–3	8–3	4–8	7–4	7–4	3–8	6–6	6–9
Chicago	5–6	6–5	8–3	—	5–7	4–7	11–1	4–7	6–6	2–9	8–3	5–6	3–8	5–6	8–7
Cleveland	4–7	5–6	5–6	7–5	—	6–5	8–3	8–4	8–4	5–6	7–4	3–8	5–6	6–5	9–6
Detroit	6–5	6–6	7–5	7–4	5–6	—	6–5	4–7	4–7	2–10	7–4	4–7	7–4	6–6	8–7
Kansas City	5–6	4–7	8–3	1–11	3–8	5–6	—	6–6	7–5	3–8	3–8	5–6	6–5	5–6	6–9
Milwaukee	4–7	6–5	3–8	7–4	4–8	7–4	6–6	—	5–7	4–7	5–6	5–6	7–4	7–4	8–7
Minnesota	7–4	1–10	3–8	6–6	4–8	7–4	5–7	7–5	—	3–8	7–4	5–6	3–8	3–8	7–8
New York	7–4	4–8	8–4	9–2	6–5	10–2	8–3	7–4	8–3	—	6–5	4–7	7–4	7–5	5–10
Oakland	1–11	3–8	4–7	3–8	4–7	4–7	8–3	6–5	4–7	5–6	—	5–7	5–7	6–5	7–9
Seattle	6–6	4–7	4–7	6–5	8–3	7–4	6–5	6–5	6–5	7–4	7–5	—	8–4	8–3	7–9
Texas	4–8	1–10	8–3	8–3	6–5	4–7	5–6	4–7	8–3	4–7	7–5	4–8	—	4–7	10–6
Toronto	5–6	6–6	6–6	6–5	5–6	6–6	6–5	4–7	8–3	5–7	5–6	3–8	7–4	—	4–11

=== Notable transactions ===
- April 21, 1997: Ryan Thompson signed as a free agent with the Cleveland Indians.
- May 20, 1997: Torey Lovullo was signed as a free agent with the Cleveland Indians.
- June 3, 1997: Kevin Mitchell was released by the Cleveland Indians.
- June 5, 1997: Ryan Thompson was traded by the Cleveland Indians to the Toronto Blue Jays for Jeff Manto.
- June 9, 1997: Dave Weathers was traded by the New York Yankees to the Cleveland Indians for Chad Curtis.
- July 3, 1997: Greg Cadaret was released by the Cleveland Indians.
- July 25, 1997: Pat Listach was signed as a free agent with the Cleveland Indians.
- July 31, 1997: John Smiley was traded by the Cincinnati Reds with Jeff Branson to the Cleveland Indians for Jim Crowell, Danny Graves, Damian Jackson, and Scott Winchester.
- July 31, 1997: Jeff Juden was traded by the Montreal Expos to the Cleveland Indians for Steve Kline.
- August 13, 1997: Julio Franco was released by the Cleveland Indians.

=== Roster ===
1997 Cleveland Indians
**Roster**
**Pitchers**: 34 Brian Anderson; 45 Paul Assenmacher; 47 Terry Clark; 40 Bartolo Colón; 35 Danny Graves; 55 Orel Hershiser; 42 Mike Jackson; 46 Jason Jacome; 7 Jeff Juden; 52 Steve Kline; 59 Albie Lopez; 29 Jack McDowell; 49 José Mesa; 51 Alvin Morman; 41 Charles Nagy; 37 Chad Ogea; 38 Eric Plunk; 53 Paul Shuey; 57 John Smiley; 50 David Weathers; 27 Jaret Wright	**Catchers**: 15 Sandy Alomar Jr.; 10 Pat Borders; 2 Einar Díaz; **Infielders**: 11 Jeff Branson; 26 Casey Candaele; 52 Sean Casey; 1 Tony Fernández; 23 Julio Franco; 11 Damian Jackson; 12 Jeff Manto; 6 Bip Roberts; 44 Richie Sexson; 20 Kevin Seitzer; 25 Jim Thome; 13 Omar Vizquel; 9 Matt Williams; 35 Enrique Wilson	**Outfielders**: 56 Bruce Aven; 12 Chad Curtis; 22 Brian Giles; 17 Marquis Grissom; 30 Trent Hubbard; 33,23 David Justice; 44 Kevin Mitchell; 24 Manny Ramírez	**Manager**: 21 Mike Hargrove; **Coaches**: 54 Johnny Goryl (Bench); 4 Luis Isaac (Bullpen); 42 Charlie Manuel (Hitting); 8 Dave Nelson (First base); 16 Jeff Newman (Third base); 28 Mark Wiley (Pitching); 43 Dan Williams (Bullpen catcher)

=== Game log ===
1997 Game Log: 86–75 (Home: 44–37; Away: 42–38)
April: 12–13 (Home: 5–6; Away: 7–7)

#	Date	Opponent	Score	Win	Loss	Save	Stadium	Attendance	Record	Streak
1	April 2	@ Athletics	9–7	**Kline** (1–0)	Wengert (0–1)	**Shuey** (1)	Oakland–Alameda County Coliseum	41,235	1–0	W1
2	April 3	@ Athletics	4–5	Lewis (1–0)	**Plunk** (0–1)	Taylor (1)	Oakland–Alameda County Coliseum	13,707	1–1	L1
3	April 4	@ Angels	6–8 (11)	Holtz (1–0)	**Shuey** (0–1)	–	Anaheim Stadium	17,758	1–2	L2
4	April 5	@ Angels	7–5	**Ogea** (1–0)	Hasegawa (0–1)	**Shuey** (2)	Anaheim Stadium	23,913	2–2	W1
5	April 6	@ Angels	10–8	**Kline** (2–0)	Percival (0–2)	**Jackson** (1)	Anaheim Stadium	29,363	3–2	W2
6	April 7	@ Mariners	8–3	**Nagy** (1–0)	Sanders (0–2)	–	Kingdome	22,012	4–2	W3
7	April 8	@ Mariners	8–14	Hurtado (1–0)	**Lopez** (0–1)	–	Kingdome	24,348	4–3	L1
8	April 9	@ Mariners	1–11	Wolcott (1–1)	**Colon** (0–1)	–	Kingdome	28,302	4–4	L2
9	April 11	Angels	15–3	**Ogea** (2–0)	Gubicza (0–1)	–	**Jacobs Field**	42,643	5–4	W1
–	April 12	Angels	Postponed (rain, makeup July 28)							
10	April 13	Angels	3–8	Langston (1–1)	**McDowell** (0–1)	–	**Jacobs Field**	41,218	5–5	L1
11	April 14	Mariners	1–6	Martinez (1–0)	**Nagy** (1–1)	–	**Jacobs Field**	41,184	5–6	L2
12	April 15	Mariners	4–8	Wells (1–0)	**Jackson** (0–1)	Charlton (3)	**Jacobs Field**	40,118	5–7	L3
13	April 16	@ Red Sox	6–11	Avery (1–1)	**Ogea** (2–1)	–	Fenway Park	21,305	5–8	L4
14	April 17	@ Red Sox	4–3	**Kline** (3–0)	Trlicek (2–3)	**Mesa** (1)	Fenway Park	17,988	6–8	W1
15	April 18	Brewers	2–10	McDonald (2–1)	**McDowell** (0–2)	–	**Jacobs Field**	40,343	6–9	L1
16	April 19	Brewers	11–6	**Nagy** (2–1)	Eldred (2–1)	–	**Jacobs Field**	40,237	7–9	W1
17	April 20	Brewers	6–4	**Hershiser** (1–0)	Wickman (2–1)	**Mesa** (2)	**Jacobs Field**	42,285	8–9	W2
18	April 22	Red Sox	2–8	Avery (2–1)	**Ogea** (2–2)	Henry (3)	**Jacobs Field**	41,800	8–10	L1
19	April 23	Red Sox	11–7	**McDowell** (1–2)	Trlicek (2–4)	–	**Jacobs Field**	42,430	9–10	W1
20	April 24	@ Brewers	6–3	**Nagy** (3–1)	Eldred (2–2)	**Mesa** (3)	County Stadium	7,135	10–10	W2
21	April 25	@ Brewers	11–4	**Hershiser** (2–0)	Karl (0–4)	–	County Stadium	11,150	11–10	W3
22	April 26	@ Brewers	8–9	Jones (1–0)	**Mesa** (0–1)	–	County Stadium	13,028	11–11	L1
23	April 27	@ Brewers	5–6	Jones (2–0)	**Plunk** (0–2)	–	County Stadium	19,709	11–12	L2
24	April 29	Athletics	10–4	**Nagy** (4–1)	Prieto (2–1)	**Jackson** (2)	**Jacobs Field**	40,421	12–12	W1
25	April 30	Athletics	9–11 (10)	Taylor (1–1)	**Mesa** (0–2)	Wengert (1)	**Jacobs Field**	40,463	12–13	L1

May: 15–11 (Home: 9–3; Away: 6–8)

#	Date	Opponent	Score	Win	Loss	Save	Stadium	Attendance	Record	Streak
26	May 1	Athletics	7–1	**McDowell** (2–2)	Adams (1–3)	–	**Jacobs Field**	42,398	13–13	W1
–	May 2	Tigers	Postponed (rain, makeup August 13)							
27	May 3	Tigers	7–6	**Plunk** (1–2)	Brocail (0–3)	–	**Jacobs Field**	42,269	14–13	W2
28	May 4	Tigers	0–2	Blair (3–2)	**Nagy** (4–2)	Brocail (1)	**Jacobs Field**	42,387	14–14	L1
–	May 5	Rangers	Postponed (rain, makeup August 9)							
29	May 6	Rangers	5–4	**Hershiser** (3–0)	Pavlik (2–3)	**Jackson** (3)	**Jacobs Field**	40,451	15–14	W1
30	May 7	Blue Jays	7–1	**McDowell** (3–2)	Person (0–2)	–	**Jacobs Field**	42,463	16–14	W2
31	May 8	Blue Jays	3–4	Guzman (3–2)	**Ogea** (2–3)	Quantrill (1)	**Jacobs Field**	42,567	16–15	L1
32	May 9	@ Tigers	5–0	**Nagy** (5–2)	Sager (2–2)	–	Tiger Stadium	20,393	17–15	W1
33	May 10	@ Tigers	0–6	Olivares (2–2)	**Colon** (0–2)	–	Tiger Stadium	30,578	17–16	L1
34	May 11	@ Tigers	3–11	Thompson (3–2)	**Hershiser** (3–1)	–	Tiger Stadium	19,869	17–17	L2
35	May 12	@ Rangers	2–4	Burkett (2–2)	**McDowell** (3–3)	Wetteland (9)	The Ballpark in Arlington	25,327	17–18	L3
36	May 13	@ Rangers	7–3	**Ogea** (3–3)	Oliver (1–4)	**Morman** (1)	The Ballpark in Arlington	31,798	18–18	W1
37	May 14	@ Rangers	3–4 (10)	Wetteland (2–0)	**Lopez** (0–2)	–	The Ballpark in Arlington	30,268	18–19	L1
38	May 16	@ Blue Jays	2–5	Clemens (7–0)	**Hershiser** (3–2)	Timlin (5)	SkyDome	35,195	18–20	L2
39	May 17	@ Blue Jays	8–1	**Lopez** (1–2)	Williams (1–3)	–	SkyDome	36,220	19–20	W1
40	May 18	@ Blue Jays	8–6	**Ogea** (4–3)	Carpenter (0–2)	**Jackson** (4)	SkyDome	31,137	20–20	W2
41	May 20	Royals	4–3	**Shuey** (1–1)	Walker (2–2)	**Jackson** (5)	**Jacobs Field**	43,167	21–20	W3
42	May 21	Royals	1–0	**Hershiser** (4–2)	Appier (4–3)	**Jackson** (6)	**Jacobs Field**	42,290	22–20	W4
43	May 22	Royals	9–1	**Lopez** (2–2)	Rosado (3–3)	–	**Jacobs Field**	42,962	23–20	W5
44	May 23	Orioles	6–1	**Ogea** (5–3)	Key (8–1)	–	**Jacobs Field**	41,154	24–20	W6
45	May 24	Orioles	3–8	Mussina (6–1)	**Kline** (3–1)	–	**Jacobs Field**	41,040	24–21	L1
46	May 25	Orioles	7–6	**Nagy** (6–2)	Rhodes (2–2)	**Morman** (2)	**Jacobs Field**	42,944	25–21	W1
47	May 26	@ White Sox	10–4	**Hershiser** (5–2)	Navarro (4–3)	–	Comiskey Park	26,383	26–21	W2
48	May 27	@ White Sox	2–8	Drabek (4–3)	**Lopez** (2–3)	–	Comiskey Park	20,847	26–22	L1
49	May 28	@ Royals	10–3	**Assenmacher** (1–0)	Belcher (5–6)	–	Kauffman Stadium	13,380	27–22	W1
–	May 29	@ Royals	Postponed (rain, makeup September 19)							
50	May 30	@ Orioles	0–3	Mussina (7–1)	**Nagy** (6–3)	–	Oriole Park at Camden Yards	47,759	27–23	L1
51	May 31	@ Orioles	5–8	Boskie (3–2)	**Mesa** (0–3)	Myers (17)	Oriole Park at Camden Yards	47,739	27–24	L2

June: 13–11 (Home: 7–7; Away: 6–4)

#	Date	Opponent	Score	Win	Loss	Save	Stadium	Attendance	Record	Streak
–	June 1	@ Orioles	Postponed (rain, makeup September 15)							
–	June 2	@ Orioles	Postponed (rain, makeup September 16)							
52	June 3	White Sox	5–9	Darwin (2–2)	**Ogea** (5–4)	–	**Jacobs Field**	42,994	27–25	L3
53	June 4	White Sox	4–9	Baldwin (3–7)	**Lopez** (2–4)	–	**Jacobs Field**	42,992	27–26	L4
54	June 5	White Sox	5–4 (11)	**Shuey** (2–1)	Castillo (0–1)	–	**Jacobs Field**	42,948	28–26	W1
55	June 6	@ Red Sox	7–3	**Hershiser** (6–2)	Gordon (3–6)	–	Fenway Park	30,202	29–26	W2
56	June 7	@ Red Sox	9–5	**Colon** (1–2)	Sele (6–5)	–	Fenway Park	32,780	30–26	W3
57	June 8	@ Red Sox	6–12	Hudson (1–0)	**Ogea** (5–5)	–	Fenway Park	32,155	30–27	L1
58	June 10	Brewers	5–4	**Nagy** (7–3)	Eldred (6–6)	**Jackson** (7)	**Jacobs Field**	42,882	31–27	W1
59	June 11	Brewers	4–3 (11)	**Assenmacher** (2–0)	Jones (3–3)	–	**Jacobs Field**	42,864	32–27	W2
60	June 12	Brewers	2–6	Mercedes (3–2)	**Anderson** (0–1)	–	**Jacobs Field**	41,975	32–28	L1
–	June 13	@ Cardinals	Postponed (rain, makeup June 14)							
61	June 14 (1)	@ Cardinals	8–3	**Lopez** (3–4)	Mathews (2–3)	–	Busch Stadium	43,582	33–28	W1
62	June 14 (2)	@ Cardinals	2–5	Morris (5–3)	**Ogea** (5–6)	Eckersley (13)	Busch Stadium	44,532	33–29	L1
63	June 15	@ Cardinals	9–2	**Nagy** (8–3)	Stottlemyre (4–5)	–	Busch Stadium	46,646	34–29	W1
64	June 16	Reds	1–4	Tomko (3–1)	**Hershiser** (6–3)	–	**Jacobs Field**	42,961	34–30	L1
65	June 17	Reds	5–1	**Anderson** (1–1)	Smiley (5–8)	–	**Jacobs Field**	42,901	35–30	W1
66	June 18	Reds	2–5	Remlinger (2–3)	**Ogea** (5–7)	–	**Jacobs Field**	42,865	35–31	L1
67	June 20	Yankees	1–7	Gooden (2–0)	**Nagy** (8–4)	–	**Jacobs Field**	43,019	35–32	L2
68	June 21	Yankees	13–4	**Hershiser** (7–3)	Pettitte (8–5)	–	**Jacobs Field**	43,006	36–32	W1
69	June 22	Yankees	5–2	**Anderson** (2–1)	Wells (8–4)	**Jackson** (8)	**Jacobs Field**	42,912	37–32	W2
70	June 23	Twins	2–7	Radke (8–5)	**Ogea** (5–8)	–	**Jacobs Field**	42,861	37–33	L1
71	June 24	Twins	10–5	**Wright** (1–0)	Stevens (0–1)	–	**Jacobs Field**	42,902	38–33	W1
–	June 25	Twins	Postponed (rain, makeup September 27)							
72	June 27	@ Yankees	2–3	Gooden (3–0)	**Hershiser** (7–4)	Rivera (26)	Yankee Stadium	35,837	38–34	L1
73	June 28	@ Yankees	12–8	**Plunk** (2–2)	Rogers (4–4)	–	Yankee Stadium	41,085	39–34	W1
74	June 29	@ Yankees	10–11	Rivera (2–2)	**Mesa** (0–4)	–	Yankee Stadium	39,756	39–35	L1
75	June 30	@ Astros	6–4	**Mesa** (1–4)	Martin (2–2)	**Jackson** (9)	Astrodome	29,051	40–35	W1

July: 14–13 (Home: 7–10; Away: 7–3)

#	Date	Opponent	Score	Win	Loss	Save	Stadium	Attendance	Record	Streak
76	July 1	@ Astros	8–6	**Plunk** (3–2)	Lima (1–4)	**Jackson** (10)	Astrodome	23,998	41–35	W2
77	July 2	@ Astros	2–6	Hampton (4–7)	**Hershiser** (7–5)	–	Astrodome	25,661	41–36	L1
78	July 4	Royals	7–6	**Anderson** (3–1)	Pichardo (2–4)	**Jackson** (11)	**Jacobs Field**	42,984	42–36	W1
79	July 5	Royals	8–4	**Nagy** (9–4)	Pittsley (2–6)	–	**Jacobs Field**	42,892	43–36	W2
80	July 6	Royals	8–7	**Jackson** (1–1)	Casian (0–2)	–	**Jacobs Field**	42,863	44–36	W3
–	July 8	68th All-Star Game	National League vs. American League (Jacobs Field, Cleveland, Ohio)							
81	July 10	@ Twins	2–8	Radke (11–5)	**Nagy** (9–5)	–	Hubert H. Humphrey Metrodome	13,605	44–37	L1
82	July 11	@ Twins	5–1	**Jacome** (1–0)	Robertson (7–7)	–	Hubert H. Humphrey Metrodome	14,400	45–37	W1
83	July 12	@ Twins	7–2	**Hershiser** (8–5)	Tewksbury (4–8)	–	Hubert H. Humphrey Metrodome	30,055	46–37	W2
84	July 13	@ Twins	12–5	**Colon** (2–2)	Hawkins (1–5)	–	Hubert H. Humphrey Metrodome	16,734	47–37	W3
85	July 14	@ Yankees	3–2 (10)	**Jackson** (2–1)	Rivera (2–3)	–	Yankee Stadium	27,812	48–37	W4
86	July 15	@ Yankees	6–12	Irabu (2–0)	**Nagy** (9–6)	Mendoza (1)	Yankee Stadium	34,503	48–38	L1
87	July 16	@ Brewers	4–3	**Wright** (2–0)	McDonald (8–7)	**Jackson** (12)	County Stadium	23,047	49–38	W1
88	July 17	@ Brewers	3–2	**Hershiser** (9–5)	Eldred (9–9)	**Jackson** (13)	County Stadium	23,383	50–38	W2
89	July 18	Red Sox	0–7	Wakefield (4–10)	**Colon** (2–3)	–	**Jacobs Field**	43,037	50–39	L1
90	July 19	Red Sox	3–6	Suppan (4–0)	**Clark** (0–1)	Slocumb (14)	**Jacobs Field**	43,070	50–40	L2
91	July 20	Red Sox	7–2	**Nagy** (10–6)	Gordon (5–8)	–	**Jacobs Field**	42,932	51–40	W1
92	July 21	Red Sox	1–3	Avery (4–2)	**Wright** (2–1)	Slocumb (15)	**Jacobs Field**	42,851	51–41	L1
93	July 22	Mariners	6–2	**Weathers** (1–1)	Fassero (8–6)	**Jackson** (14)	**Jacobs Field**	42,951	52–41	W1
94	July 23	Mariners	3–6	Olivares (6–6)	**Colon** (2–4)	Holzemer (1)	**Jacobs Field**	43,049	52–42	L1
95	July 24	Mariners	1–11	Johnson (14–2)	**Clark** (0–2)	–	**Jacobs Field**	42,984	52–43	L2
96	July 25	Athletics	1–2	Small (7–4)	**Jackson** (2–2)	Taylor (19)	**Jacobs Field**	42,945	52–44	L3
97	July 26	Athletics	6–3	**Wright** (3–1)	Karsay (3–10)	–	**Jacobs Field**	42,925	53–44	W1
98	July 27	Athletics	4–2	**Jacome** (2–0)	Haynes (0–1)	**Assenmacher** (1)	**Jacobs Field**	42,885	54–44	W2
99	July 28 (1)	Angels	0–2	Springer (6–4)	**Colon** (2–5)	–	**Jacobs Field**	43,033	54–45	L1
100	July 28 (2)	Angels	7–10	Harris (2–2)	**Weathers** (1–2)	Holtz (2)	**Jacobs Field**	42,857	54–46	L2
101	July 29	Angels	2–7	Finley (10–6)	**Clark** (0–3)	–	**Jacobs Field**	42,975	54–47	L3
102	July 30	Angels	2–5	Hill (6–8)	**Nagy** (10–7)	James (7)	**Jacobs Field**	42,898	54–48	L4

August: 16–14 (Home: 9–6; Away: 7–8)

#	Date	Opponent	Score	Win	Loss	Save	Stadium	Attendance	Record	Streak
103	August 1	@ Rangers	8–5	**Mesa** (2–4)	Gunderson (2–1)	**Assenmacher** (2)	The Ballpark in Arlington	44,859	55–48	W1
104	August 2	@ Rangers	7–3	**Smiley** (10–10)	Witt (10–7)	–	The Ballpark in Arlington	23,266	56–48	W2
105	August 3	@ Rangers	7–8	Wetteland (6–2)	**Jackson** (2–3)	–	The Ballpark in Arlington	42,303	56–49	L1
106	August 4	@ Tigers	7–2	**Nagy** (11–7)	Sanders (3–9)	–	Tiger Stadium	26,832	57–49	W1
107	August 5	@ Tigers	4–6	Thompson (10–8)	**Plunk** (3–3)	Jones (22)	Tiger Stadium	24,824	57–50	L1
108	August 6	@ Blue Jays	3–6	Hentgen (12–7)	**Lopez** (3–5)	Escobar (7)	SkyDome	36,463	57–51	L2
109	August 7	@ Blue Jays	0–4	Clemens (17–4)	**Smiley** (10–11)	–	SkyDome	35,194	57–52	L3
110	August 8	Rangers	5–6	Bailes (1–0)	**Jackson** (2–4)	Wetteland (23)	**Jacobs Field**	43,110	57–53	L4
111	August 9 (1)	Rangers	3–4	Clark (1–3)	**Nagy** (11–8)	Wetteland (24)	**Jacobs Field**	42,964	57–54	L5
112	August 9 (2)	Rangers	4–2	**Assenmacher** (3–0)	Moody (0–1)	**Mesa** (4)	**Jacobs Field**	41,330	58–54	W1
113	August 10	Rangers	6–7	Whiteside (2–1)	**Juden** (11–6)	Wetteland (25)	**Jacobs Field**	42,902	58–55	L1
114	August 12	Tigers	7–4	**Plunk** (4–3)	Keagle (0–2)	**Mesa** (5)	**Jacobs Field**	32,992	59–55	W1
115	August 13 (1)	Tigers	3–13	Blair (12–5)	**Smiley** (10–12)	–	**Jacobs Field**	N/A	59–56	L1
116	August 13 (2)	Tigers	9–1	**Hershiser** (10–5)	Dishman (1–1)	–	**Jacobs Field**	42,673	60–56	W1
117	August 14	Tigers	12–1	**Nagy** (12–8)	Sanders (4–10)	–	**Jacobs Field**	42,936	61–56	W2
118	August 15	Blue Jays	5–4 (10)	**Assenmacher** (4–0)	Crabtree (2–3)	–	**Jacobs Field**	43,011	62–56	W3
119	August 16	Blue Jays	8–4	**Shuey** (3–1)	Quantrill (5–5)	–	**Jacobs Field**	42,908	63–56	W4
120	August 17	Blue Jays	5–10	Clemens (19–4)	**Wright** (3–2)	–	**Jacobs Field**	42,861	63–57	L1
121	August 18	Blue Jays	5–3	**Hershiser** (11–5)	Williams (7–11)	**Mesa** (6)	**Jacobs Field**	42,471	64–57	W1
122	August 19	@ Mariners	7–5	**Smiley** (11–12)	Cloude (1–2)	**Mesa** (7)	Kingdome	33,645	65–57	W2
123	August 20	@ Mariners	0–1	Johnson (17–4)	**Nagy** (12–9)	Slocumb (20)	Kingdome	32,546	65–58	L1
124	August 21	@ Mariners	6–7	Moyer (13–4)	**Colon** (2–6)	Slocumb (21)	Kingdome	30,395	65–59	L2
125	August 22	@ Athletics	5–3	**Wright** (4–2)	Prieto (6–8)	**Mesa** (8)	Oakland–Alameda County Coliseum	11,451	66–59	W1
126	August 23	@ Athletics	7–4	**Hershiser** (12–5)	Rigby (0–5)	**Mesa** (9)	Oakland–Alameda County Coliseum	17,066	67–59	W2
127	August 24	@ Athletics	1–4	Haynes (2–3)	**Smiley** (11–13)	Mathews (1)	Oakland–Alameda County Coliseum	20,074	67–60	L1
128	August 26	@ Angels	7–8	May (1–1)	**Plunk** (4–4)	–	Anaheim Stadium	21,012	67–61	L2
129	August 27	@ Angels	10–4	**Wright** (5–2)	Watson (11–8)	–	Anaheim Stadium	20,140	68–61	W1
130	August 29	Cubs	7–6	**Mesa** (3–4)	Stevens (1–4)	–	**Jacobs Field**	43,060	69–61	W2
131	August 30	Cubs	4–9	Tapani (4–3)	**Smiley** (11–14)	–	**Jacobs Field**	43,044	69–62	L1
132	August 31	Cubs	9–5	**Nagy** (13–9)	Batista (0–3)	**Assenmacher** (3)	**Jacobs Field**	43,013	70–62	W1

September: 16–13 (Home: 7–5; Away: 9–8)

#	Date	Opponent	Score	Win	Loss	Save	Stadium	Attendance	Record	Streak
133	September 1	@ Pirates	7–5	**Ogea** (6–8)	Cooke (9–14)	**Mesa** (10)	Three Rivers Stadium	45,298	71–62	W2
134	September 2	@ Pirates	4–6	Silva (1–0)	**Wright** (5–3)	Loiselle (25)	Three Rivers Stadium	43,380	71–63	L1
135	September 3	@ Pirates	7–3	**Hershiser** (13–5)	Loaiza (10–10)	–	Three Rivers Stadium	37,513	72–63	W1
136	September 5	White Sox	11–1	**Nagy** (14–9)	Bere (3–1)	–	**Jacobs Field**	43,093	73–63	W2
137	September 6	White Sox	9–7	**Colon** (3–6)	Baldwin (11–14)	**Mesa** (11)	**Jacobs Field**	43,055	74–63	W3
138	September 7	White Sox	5–2	**Wright** (6–3)	Drabek (10–10)	**Mesa** (12)	**Jacobs Field**	43,051	75–63	W4
139	September 8	Orioles	2–1	**Assenmacher** (5–0)	Mills (2–2)	**Mesa** (13)	**Jacobs Field**	43,009	76–63	W5
140	September 9	Orioles	3–9 (8)	Krivda (4–0)	**Ogea** (6–9)	–	**Jacobs Field**	43,045	76–64	L1
141	September 11	@ White Sox	5–7	Foulke (3–5)	**Nagy** (14–10)	Karchner (14)	Comiskey Park	22,620	76–65	L2
142	September 12	@ White Sox	9–0	**Wright** (7–3)	Drabek (10–11)	–	Comiskey Park	31,249	77–65	W1
143	September 13	@ White Sox	6–7	Sirotka (2–0)	**Hershiser** (13–6)	Karchner (15)	Comiskey Park	32,306	77–66	L1
144	September 14	@ White Sox	8–3	**Shuey** (4–1)	Darwin (0–1)	–	Comiskey Park	32,485	78–66	W1
145	September 15 (1)	@ Orioles	5–6	Benitez (4–4)	**Plunk** (4–5)	Myers (42)	Oriole Park at Camden Yards	41,602	78–67	L1
146	September 15 (2)	@ Orioles	4–1	**Ogea** (7–9)	Krivda (4–1)	**Mesa** (14)	Oriole Park at Camden Yards	47,110	79–67	W1
147	September 16 (1)	@ Orioles	4–2	**Nagy** (15–10)	Rodriguez (0–1)	**Mesa** (15)	Oriole Park at Camden Yards	38,022	80–67	W2
148	September 16 (2)	@ Orioles	2–7	Key (16–9)	**Weathers** (1–3)	–	Oriole Park at Camden Yards	46,185	80–68	L1
149	September 17	@ Twins	7–6	**Wright** (8–3)	Miller (0–4)	**Mesa** (16)	Hubert H. Humphrey Metrodome	9,512	81–68	W1
150	September 18	@ Twins	4–1	**Hershiser** (14–6)	Tewksbury (6–13)	**Jackson** (15)	Hubert H. Humphrey Metrodome	9,564	82–68	W2
151	September 19 (1)	@ Royals	3–10	Belcher (13–12)	**Colon** (3–7)	–	Kauffman Stadium	N/A	82–69	L1
152	September 19 (2)	@ Royals	6–2	**Anderson** (4–1)	Bones (3–8)	**Assenmacher** (4)	Kauffman Stadium	16,973	83–69	W1
153	September 20	@ Royals	2–5	Olson (4–3)	**Lopez** (3–6)	Montgomery (14)	Kauffman Stadium	19,125	83–70	L1
154	September 21	@ Royals	0–1	Bevil (1–2)	**Jackson** (2–5)	–	Kauffman Stadium	15,274	83–71	L2
–	September 22	@ Royals	Cancelled (rain)							
155	September 23	Yankees	10–9	**Mesa** (4–4)	Nelson (3–7)	–	**Jacobs Field**	43,039	84–71	W1
156	September 24	Yankees	4–8	Gooden (9–5)	**Anderson** (4–2)	–	**Jacobs Field**	42,976	84–72	L1
157	September 25	Yankees	4–5 (10)	Mendoza (8–6)	**Shuey** (4–2)	Stanton (3)	**Jacobs Field**	43,004	84–73	L2
158	September 26	Twins	7–2	**Ogea** (8–9)	Radke (20–10)	–	**Jacobs Field**	42,895	85–73	W1
159	September 27 (1)	Twins	10–6	**Colon** (4–7)	Miller (1–5)	–	**Jacobs Field**	42,854	86–73	W2
160	September 27 (2)	Twins	4–6 (10)	Aguilera (5–4)	**Lopez** (3–7)	–	**Jacobs Field**	42,867	86–74	L1
161	September 28	Twins	1–5	Tewksbury (8–13)	**Nagy** (15–11)	–	**Jacobs Field**	42,940	86–75	L2

Legend: = Win = Loss = Postponement
Bold = Indians team member

== All-Star game ==
The 1997 Major League Baseball All-Star Game was the 68th playing of the midsummer classic between the all-stars of the American League (AL) and National League (NL). There were no members of the Indians in the starting lineup although three Indians (Sandy Alomar Jr., Jim Thome, and David Justice) were named to the team. The game was held on July 8, 1997, and the first pitch was thrown by former Indian Larry Doby. The American League were victorious 3 – 1, with the go ahead HR coming courtesy of Alomar Jr.

== Player stats ==
=== Batting ===
==== Starters by position ====
Note: Pos = Position; G = Games played; AB = At bats; H = Hits; Avg. = Batting average; HR = Home runs; RBI = Runs batted in

Pos	Player	G	AB	H	Avg.	HR	RBI
C	Sandy Alomar Jr.	125	451	146	.324	21	83
1B	Jim Thome	147	496	142	.286	40	102
2B	Tony Fernández	120	409	117	.286	11	44
SS	Omar Vizquel	153	565	158	.280	5	49
3B	Matt Williams	151	596	157	.263	32	105
LF	Brian Giles	130	377	101	.268	17	61
CF	Marquis Grissom	144	558	146	.262	12	66
RF	Manny Ramirez	150	561	184	.328	26	88
DH	David Justice	139	495	163	.329	33	101

==== Other batters ====
Note: G = Games played; AB = At bats; H = Hits; Avg. = Batting average; HR = Home runs; RBI = Runs batted in

Player	G	AB	H	Avg.	HR	RBI
Julio Franco	78	289	82	.284	3	25
Kevin Seitzer	64	198	53	.268	2	24
Pat Borders	55	159	47	.296	4	15
Bip Roberts	23	85	23	.271	3	8
Jeff Branson	29	72	19	.264	2	7
Kevin Mitchell	20	59	9	.153	4	11
Jeff Manto	16	30	8	.267	2	7
Chad Curtis	22	29	6	.207	3	5
Casey Candaele	14	26	8	.308	0	4
Bruce Aven	13	19	4	.211	0	2
Enrique Wilson	5	15	5	.333	0	1
Trent Hubbard	7	12	3	.250	0	0
Richie Sexson	5	11	3	.273	0	0
Sean Casey	6	10	2	.200	0	1
Damian Jackson	8	9	1	.111	0	0
Einar Díaz	5	7	1	.143	0	1

=== Pitching ===
==== Starting pitchers ====
Note: G = Games pitched; IP = Innings pitched; W = Wins; L = Losses; ERA = Earned run average; SO = Strikeouts

Player	G	IP	W	L	ERA	SO
Charles Nagy	34	227.0	15	11	4.28	149
Orel Hershiser	32	195.1	14	6	4.47	107
Chad Ogea	21	126.1	8	9	4.99	80
Bartolo Colón	19	94.0	4	7	5.65	66
Jaret Wright	16	90.1	8	3	4.38	63
Brian Anderson	8	48.0	4	2	4.69	22
John Smiley	6	37.1	2	4	5.54	26
Terry Clark	4	26.1	0	3	6.15	13

==== Other pitchers ====
Note: G = Games pitched; IP = Innings pitched; W = Wins; L = Losses; ERA = Earned run average; SO = Strikeouts

Player	G	IP	W	L	ERA	SO
Albie Lopez	37	76.2	3	7	6.93	63
Jason Jacome	21	42.2	2	0	5.27	24
Jack McDowell	8	40.2	3	3	5.09	38
Jeff Juden	8	31.1	0	1	5.46	29
David Weathers	9	16.2	1	2	7.56	14

==== Relief pitchers ====
Note: G = Games pitched; W = Wins; L = Losses; SV = Saves; ERA = Earned run average; SO = Strikeouts

Player	G	W	L	SV	ERA	SO
José Mesa	66	4	4	16	2.40	69
Paul Assenmacher	75	5	0	4	2.94	53
Mike Jackson	71	2	5	15	3.24	74
Eric Plunk	55	4	5	0	4.66	66
Paul Shuey	40	4	2	2	6.20	46
Alvin Morman	34	0	0	2	5.89	13
Steve Kline	20	3	1	0	5.81	17
Danny Graves	5	0	0	0	4.76	4

== American League Division Series ==
=== Cleveland Indians vs. New York Yankees ===
==== Game 1 ====
September 30, Yankee Stadium

Team	1	2	3	4	5	6	7	8	9	R	H	E
Cleveland	5	0	0	1	0	0	0	0	0	6	11	0
New York	0	1	0	1	1	5	0	0	X	8	11	0
W: Ramiro Mendoza (1–0) L: Eric Plunk (0–1) SV: Mariano Rivera (1)
HR: CLE – Sandy Alomar Jr. (1) NYY – Tino Martinez (1) Tim Raines (1) Derek Jeter (1) Paul O'Neill (1)

==== Game 2 ====
October 2, Yankee Stadium

Team	1	2	3	4	5	6	7	8	9	R	H	E
Cleveland	0	0	0	5	2	0	0	0	0	7	11	1
New York	3	0	0	0	0	0	0	1	1	5	7	2
W: Jaret Wright (1–0) L: Andy Pettitte (0–1) SV: None
HR: CLE – Matt Williams (1) NYY – Derek Jeter (2)

==== Game 3 ====
October 4, Jacobs Field

Team	1	2	3	4	5	6	7	8	9	R	H	E
New York	1	0	1	4	0	0	0	0	0	6	4	1
Cleveland	0	1	0	0	0	0	0	0	0	1	5	1
W: David Wells (1–0) L: Charles Nagy (0–1) SV: None
HR: CLE – None NYY – Paul O'Neill (2)

==== Game 4 ====
October 5, Jacobs Field

Team	1	2	3	4	5	6	7	8	9	R	H	E
New York	2	0	0	0	0	0	0	0	0	2	9	1
Cleveland	0	1	0	0	0	0	0	1	1	3	9	0
W: Mike Jackson (1–0) L: Ramiro Mendoza (1-1) SV: None
HR: CLE – David Justice (1) Sandy Alomar Jr. (2) NYY – None

==== Game 5 ====
October 6, Jacobs Field

Team	1	2	3	4	5	6	7	8	9	R	H	E
New York	0	0	0	0	2	1	0	0	0	3	12	0
Cleveland	0	0	3	1	0	0	0	0	X	4	7	2
W: Jaret Wright (2–0) L: Andy Pettitte (0–2) SV: José Mesa (1)
HR: CLE – None NYY – None

== American League Championship Series ==
=== Game 1 ===
October 8, Camden Yards

Team	1	2	3	4	5	6	7	8	9	R	H	E
Cleveland	0	0	0	0	0	0	0	0	0	0	4	1
Baltimore	1	0	2	0	0	0	0	0	X	3	6	1
WP: Scott Erickson (1–0) LP: Chad Ogea (0–1) SV: Randy Myers (1)
HRs: BAL – Brady Anderson (1) Roberto Alomar (1)

=== Game 2 ===
October 9, Camden Yards

Team	1	2	3	4	5	6	7	8	9	R	H	E
Cleveland	2	0	0	0	0	0	0	3	0	5	6	3
Baltimore	0	2	0	0	0	2	0	0	0	4	8	1
WP: Paul Assenmacher (1–0) LP: Armando Benítez (0–1) SV: José Mesa (1)
HRs: CLE – Manny Ramírez (1) Marquis Grissom (1) BAL – Cal Ripken (1)

=== Game 3 ===
October 11, Jacobs Field

Team	1	2	3	4	5	6	7	8	9	10	11	12	R	H	E
Baltimore	0	0	0	0	0	0	0	0	1	0	0	0	1	8	1
Cleveland	0	0	0	0	0	0	1	0	0	0	0	1	2	6	0
WP: Eric Plunk (1–0) LP: Randy Myers (0–1)
HRs: None

=== Game 4 ===
October 12, Jacobs Field

Team	1	2	3	4	5	6	7	8	9	R	H	E
Baltimore	0	1	4	0	0	0	1	0	1	7	12	2
Cleveland	0	2	0	1	4	0	0	0	1	8	13	0
WP: José Mesa (1–0) LP: Alan Mills (0–1)
HRs: CLE – Sandy Alomar Jr. (1) Manny Ramírez (2) BAL – Brady Anderson (2) Harold Baines (1) Rafael Palmeiro (1)

=== Game 5 ===
October 13, Jacobs Field

Team	1	2	3	4	5	6	7	8	9	R	H	E
Baltimore	0	0	2	0	0	0	0	0	2	4	10	0
Cleveland	0	0	0	0	0	0	0	0	2	2	8	1
WP: Scott Kamieniecki (1–0) LP: Chad Ogea (0–2)
HRs: BAL – Eric Davis (1)

=== Game 6 ===
October 15, Camden Yards

Team	1	2	3	4	5	6	7	8	9	10	11	R	H	E
Cleveland	0	0	0	0	0	0	0	0	0	0	1	1	3	0
Baltimore	0	0	0	0	0	0	0	0	0	0	0	0	10	0
WP: Brian Anderson (1–0) LP: Armando Benítez (0–2) S: José Mesa (1)
HRs: CLE: – Tony Fernández (1)

== World Series ==
=== Game 1 ===
October 18, 1997, at Pro Player Stadium in Miami

Team	1	2	3	4	5	6	7	8	9	R	H	E
Cleveland	1	0	0	0	1	1	0	1	0	4	11	0
Florida	0	0	1	4	2	0	0	0	x	7	7	1
W: Liván Hernández (1–0) L: Orel Hershiser (0–1) S: Robb Nen (1)
HR: CLE – Manny Ramírez (1), Jim Thome (1) FLA – Moisés Alou (1), Charles Johnson (1)

=== Game 2 ===
October 19, 1997, at Pro Player Stadium in Miami

Team	1	2	3	4	5	6	7	8	9	R	H	E
Cleveland	1	0	0	0	3	2	0	0	0	6	14	0
Florida	1	0	0	0	0	0	0	0	0	1	8	0
W: Chad Ogea (1–0) L: Kevin Brown (0–1)
HR: CLE – Sandy Alomar Jr. (1)

=== Game 3 ===
October 21, 1997, at Jacobs Field in Cleveland, Ohio

Team	1	2	3	4	5	6	7	8	9	R	H	E
Florida	1	0	1	1	0	2	2	0	7	14	16	3
Cleveland	2	0	0	3	2	0	0	0	4	11	10	3
W: Dennis Cook (1–0) L: Eric Plunk (0–1) S: Robb Nen (2)
HR: FLA – Gary Sheffield (1), Darren Daulton (1), Jim Eisenreich (1) CLE – Jim Thome (2)

=== Game 4 ===
October 22, 1997, at Jacobs Field in Cleveland, Ohio

Team	1	2	3	4	5	6	7	8	9	R	H	E
Florida	0	0	0	1	0	2	0	0	0	3	6	2
Cleveland	3	0	3	0	0	1	1	2	X	10	15	0
W: Jaret Wright (1–0) L: Tony Saunders (0–1)
HR: FLA – Moisés Alou (2) CLE – Manny Ramírez (2), Matt Williams (1)

=== Game 5 ===
October 23, 1997, at Jacobs Field in Cleveland, Ohio

Team	1	2	3	4	5	6	7	8	9	R	H	E
Florida	0	2	0	0	0	4	0	1	1	8	15	2
Cleveland	0	1	3	0	0	0	0	0	3	7	9	0
W: Liván Hernández (2–0) L: Orel Hershiser (0–2) S: Robb Nen (3)
HR: FLA – Moisés Alou (3) CLE – Sandy Alomar Jr. (2)

=== Game 6 ===
October 25, 1997, at Pro Player Stadium in Miami

Team	1	2	3	4	5	6	7	8	9	R	H	E
Cleveland	0	2	0	1	0	1	0	0	0	4	7	0
Florida	0	0	0	0	1	0	0	0	0	1	8	0
W: Chad Ogea (2–0) L: Kevin Brown (0–2) S: José Mesa (1)

=== Game 7 ===
October 26, 1997, at Pro Player Stadium in Miami

Team	1	2	3	4	5	6	7	8	9	10	11	R	H	E
Cleveland	0	0	2	0	0	0	0	0	0	0	0	2	6	2
Florida	0	0	0	0	0	0	1	0	1	0	1	3	8	0
W: Jay Powell (1–0) L: Charles Nagy (0–1)
HR – FLA: Bobby Bonilla (1)

== Award winners ==
- Marquis Grissom, Outfield, ALCS MVP

All-Star Game

- Sandy Alomar Jr., catcher, reserve
- Jim Thome, first baseman, reserve
- David Justice, Outfield, elected to start, but was unable to play due to an injury.

== Minor league affiliates ==
Classification level	Team	League	Season article
AAA	Buffalo Bisons	International League	1997 Buffalo Bisons season
AA	Akron Aeros	Eastern League	1997 Akron Aeros season
Advanced A	Kinston Indians	Carolina League	
A	Columbus RedStixx	South Atlantic League	
Short Season A	Watertown Indians	New York–Penn League	
Rookie	Burlington Indians	Appalachian League	
