= 1997 American League Championship Series =

28th edition of Major League Baseball's American League Championship Series

Team (Wins)	Managers	Season
Cleveland Indians (4)	Mike Hargrove	86–75 (.534), GA: 6
Baltimore Orioles (2)	Davey Johnson	98–64 (.605), GA: 2
- Dates: October 8–15
- MVP: Marquis Grissom (Cleveland)
- Umpires: Joe Brinkman, Jim Joyce, John Hirschbeck, Durwood Merrill, Larry McCoy, Mike Reilly

Broadcast
- Television: Fox
- TV announcers: Joe Buck, Tim McCarver, and Bob Brenly
- Radio: CBS
- Radio announcers: John Rooney and Jeff Torborg
- ALDS: Baltimore Orioles over Seattle Mariners (3–1); Cleveland Indians over New York Yankees (3–2)

The 1997 American League Championship Series (ALCS) was a best-of-seven playoff series in Major League Baseball’s 1997 postseason pitting the AL East champion Baltimore Orioles against the AL Central champion Cleveland Indians for the American League pennant. The Series began on October 8 and ended on October 15. The Orioles held home field advantage due to the predetermined rotation in place from 1995–1997 amongst division champions.

In a role reversal from their 1996 ALDS encounter, the Indians stunned the Orioles, winning on bizarre plays or remarkable comebacks, and won the Series four games to two, but went on to lose to the Florida Marlins in the well-fought, seesaw, seven-game battle of the 1997 World Series.

== Summary ==
=== Baltimore Orioles vs. Cleveland Indians ===
Cleveland won the series, 4–2.

Game	Date	Score	Location	Time	Attendance
1	October 8	Cleveland Indians – 0, Baltimore Orioles – 3	Oriole Park at Camden Yards	2:33	49,029
2	October 9	Cleveland Indians – 5, Baltimore Orioles – 4	Oriole Park at Camden Yards	3:53	49,131
3	October 11	Baltimore Orioles – 1, Cleveland Indians – 2 (12)	Jacobs Field	4:51	45,057
4	October 12	Baltimore Orioles – 7, Cleveland Indians – 8	Jacobs Field	3:32	45,081
5	October 13	Baltimore Orioles – 4, Cleveland Indians – 2	Jacobs Field	3:08	45,068
6	October 15	Cleveland Indians – 1, Baltimore Orioles – 0 (11)	Oriole Park at Camden Yards	3:52	49,075

== Game summaries ==
=== Game 1 ===
October 8, 1997 8:05 pm (EDT) at Oriole Park at Camden Yards in Baltimore, Maryland 75 °F (24 °C), clear
Team	1	2	3	4	5	6	7	8	9	R	H	E
Cleveland	0	0	0	0	0	0	0	0	0	0	4	1
Baltimore	1	0	2	0	0	0	0	0	X	3	6	1
WP: Scott Erickson (1–0) LP: Chad Ogea (0–1) Sv: Randy Myers (1); Home runs: CLE: None; BAL: Brady Anderson (1), Roberto Alomar (1); Attendance: 49,029; Boxscore

The Orioles grabbed an early 1–0 series lead on the strong performance by starting pitcher Scott Erickson who gave up four hits, all singles, over eight innings of work. The Indians only got one runner to second base offensively. On the other hand, Orioles center-fielder Brady Anderson took Indians starter Chad Ogea's first offering in the bottom of the first out of the park, giving the Orioles a 1–0. In the bottom of the third Anderson's double was followed by a Roberto Alomar home run, giving Erickson a 3–0 cushion. Randy Myers pitched a clean ninth inning for the save.

=== Game 2 ===
October 9, 1997 8:13 pm (EDT) at Oriole Park at Camden Yards in Baltimore, Maryland 75 °F (24 °C), clear
Team	1	2	3	4	5	6	7	8	9	R	H	E
Cleveland	2	0	0	0	0	0	0	3	0	5	6	3
Baltimore	0	2	0	0	0	2	0	0	0	4	8	1
WP: Paul Assenmacher (1–0) LP: Armando Benítez (0–1) Sv: José Mesa (1); Home runs: CLE: Manny Ramírez (1), Marquis Grissom (1); BAL: Cal Ripken (1); Attendance: 49,131; Boxscore

In Game 2, Charles Nagy and Jimmy Key matched up for a win. Key allowed a two-run homer to Manny Ramírez in the top of the first. Nagy would also allow a two-run homer in the bottom of the second to Cal Ripken Jr. Then Mike Bordick hit the go-ahead two-run single off Nagy in the sixth that knocked Nagy out of the game. With the Tribe trailing 4–2 in the top of the eighth inning, two walks put two men on with two out. Armando Benítez faced Marquis Grissom and Grissom would deliver with a series-altering three-run homer that gave the Indians a 5–4 lead. That lead would stand as the Cleveland bullpen kept the Orioles scoreless to even the series at a game apiece.

=== Game 3 ===
October 11, 1997 4:17 pm (EDT) at Jacobs Field in Cleveland, Ohio 60 °F (16 °C), cloudy
Team	1	2	3	4	5	6	7	8	9	10	11	12	R	H	E
Baltimore	0	0	0	0	0	0	0	0	1	0	0	0	1	8	1
Cleveland	0	0	0	0	0	0	1	0	0	0	0	1	2	6	0
WP: Eric Plunk (1–0) LP: Randy Myers (0–1); Attendance: 45,057; Boxscore

With the Series even at 1–1, Orel Hershiser dueled with Orioles pitcher Mike Mussina at Jacobs Field. In this game, Mussina would set an LCS record with 15 strikeouts (which would be matched by Liván Hernández in the NLCS the very next day). The Indians held a 1–0 lead into the ninth, but José Mesa blew the save after Marquis Grissom lost a fly ball from Brady Anderson in the lights and the game went to extra innings. With Randy Myers on the mound for Baltimore in the bottom of the 12th, Marquis Grissom walked, then a single by Tony Fernández moved him to third. With one out, Omar Vizquel motioned to bunt. When the pitch came, it passed through the strike zone, with Vizquel apparently missing the ball. The ball got away from Orioles catcher Lenny Webster, allowing Grissom to score the winning run. Webster and Myers thought the ball was fouled off and did nothing to stop Grissom, but the ball was not ruled foul. Although Orioles manager Davey Johnson argued the call with home plate umpire John Hirschbeck, the umpire's call stood. It was the first (and so far only) time a postseason game ended on a steal of home plate and it also serves as the last overall time a game has ended on a stolen base of home.

=== Game 4 ===
October 12, 1997 7:34 pm (EDT) at Jacobs Field in Cleveland, Ohio 70 °F (21 °C), clear
Team	1	2	3	4	5	6	7	8	9	R	H	E
Baltimore	0	1	4	0	0	0	1	0	1	7	12	2
Cleveland	0	2	0	1	4	0	0	0	1	8	13	0
WP: José Mesa (1–0) LP: Alan Mills (0–1); Home runs: BAL: Brady Anderson (2), Harold Baines (1), Rafael Palmeiro (1); CLE: Sandy Alomar Jr. (1), Manny Ramírez (2); Attendance: 45,081; Boxscore

Scott Erickson returned to the mound against Indians starter Jaret Wright. After being given an early 1–0 lead, Erickson allowed a two-run homer to Sandy Alomar Jr. However, the Orioles scored four more runs off Wright to build a 5–2 lead. The Indians closed to within two in the fourth, but in the fifth, an even more bizarre play than Vizquel's missed bunt occurred. After giving up two more runs, Erickson was relieved by Arthur Rhodes with two Indians on base and two outs. Rhodes threw a wild pitch with Grissom at bat, allowing David Justice to score from third. However, he collided with Rhodes at home, and home plate umpire Durwood Merrill obscured Lenny Webster's view of the ball. Merrill motioned for someone to get the ball as Sandy Alomar also scored. Now down 2 runs, Baltimore would score a run in the 7th. The Orioles would tie the game in the ninth inning again off José Mesa. Sandy Alomar singled in the winning run in the bottom of the ninth, giving the Indians an 8–7 win as well as a three games to one lead in the Series.

=== Game 5 ===
October 13, 1997 8:11 pm (EDT) at Jacobs Field in Cleveland, Ohio 74 °F (23 °C), clear
Team	1	2	3	4	5	6	7	8	9	R	H	E
Baltimore	0	0	2	0	0	0	0	0	2	4	10	0
Cleveland	0	0	0	0	0	0	0	0	2	2	8	1
WP: Scott Kamieniecki (1–0) LP: Chad Ogea (0–2); Home runs: BAL: Eric Davis (1); CLE: None; Attendance: 45,068; Boxscore

With the Orioles facing elimination they took a 2–0 lead in the third inning when right-fielder Gerónimo Berroa singled with the bases loaded off Cleveland starter Chad Ogea. From there Orioles starter Scott Kamieniecki held the Indians scoreless through five innings. Jimmy Key then turned in three scoreless innings in relief of Kamieniecki, who left the game due to elbow stiffness. Indians reliever Paul Assenmacher allowed four hits and two runs, including a home run by Eric Davis, in the ninth inning to stretch the Baltimore lead to 4–0. Orioles closer Randy Myers allowed RBI doubles to Matt Williams and Tony Fernández in the bottom of the ninth, but the Orioles held on for a 4–2 win, sending the series back to Baltimore. To date, this is the last game the Orioles have won in the ALCS.

=== Game 6 ===
October 15, 1997 4:17 pm (EDT) at Oriole Park at Camden Yards in Baltimore, Maryland 57 °F (14 °C), overcast
Team	1	2	3	4	5	6	7	8	9	10	11	R	H	E
Cleveland	0	0	0	0	0	0	0	0	0	0	1	1	3	0
Baltimore	0	0	0	0	0	0	0	0	0	0	0	0	10	0
WP: Brian Anderson (1–0) LP: Armando Benítez (0–2) Sv: José Mesa (2); Home runs: CLE: Tony Fernández (1); BAL: None; Attendance: 49,075; Boxscore

Charles Nagy and Mike Mussina kept the game scoreless and the game proceeded to the 11th inning. In the 11th, Tony Fernández, who hit a batting practice ball that bruised Bip Roberts' thumb (and, as a result, replaced Roberts at second base), hit a home run that gave the Indians a 1–0 lead. With two outs in the bottom half of the 11th, Brady Anderson singled to right off José Mesa. With Anderson on as the tying run, Roberto Alomar came up to bat. Alomar struck out looking on a pitch that appeared inside at first but came back across the plate. This gave Cleveland the out and the trip to the World Series.

== Composite box ==
1997 ALCS (4–2): Cleveland Indians over Baltimore Orioles

Team	1	2	3	4	5	6	7	8	9	10	11	12	R	H	E
Cleveland Indians	2	2	0	1	4	0	1	3	3	0	1	1	18	40	5
Baltimore Orioles	1	3	8	0	0	2	1	0	4	0	0	0	19	54	5
Total attendance: 282,441 Average attendance: 47,074

== Aftermath ==
This series was often overshadowed, as it was the only ALCS to not feature the dynasty New York Yankees from 1996–2001. The series featured a back-and-forth action throughout, with the tying run coming up to the plate in the ninth or later inning in each game besides Game 1. In 2011, Fangraphs, via a mathematical formula, named the 1997 ALCS the 10th best postseason series of all-time.

As Davey Johnson had a poor relationship with Reds owner Marge Schott, which led to his ousting as manager despite success, the same situation would occur in Baltimore. The relationship between Johnson and owner Peter Angelos had always seemed poor, but it hit a boiling point in April 1997 when Johnson fined Roberto Alomar for missing a team banquet and required that Alomar's fine go to Johnson's wife's charity. Angelos found this inappropriate and let it be known that he was considering firing Johnson after the incidient. Following two seasons in which Baltimore reached the postseason back-to-back for the first time since 1973–1974, Johnson offered his resignation by fax (after failing to reach owner Angelos by phone), which Angelos accepted on November 5, the same day that Johnson was named the 1997 American League Manager of the Year. The Orioles hired Ray Miller as manager for the 1998 season, but the team would not have another winning season, let alone reach the postseason, until 2012. Two years later after leaving Baltimore, Johnson returned to the majors to manage the Los Angeles Dodgers in 1999. Johnson would later return to the Beltway area to manage the Washington Nationals from 2011 to 2013.

Roberto Alomar joined his brother, Sandy, in Cleveland a year later via free agency. In his three seasons in Baltimore, Alomar was a key figure in the Orioles' mid 1990s resurgence. On August 3, 2013, Alomar was inducted into the Baltimore Orioles Hall of Fame, two years after being inducted into the National Baseball Hall of Fame. The 1997 ALCS was the last postseason series to have two siblings facing off against each other until the 2022 NLCS, which featured starting pitcher Aaron Nola's Phillies beating catcher Austin Nola's Padres.
