= Jason Jacome =

American baseball player (born 1970)

- Pitcher
- Born: November 24, 1970 (age 55); Tulsa, Oklahoma, U.S.
- Batted: Left Threw: Left

Professional debut
- MLB: July 2, 1994, for the New York Mets
- NPB: April 4, 1999, for the Yakult Swallows

Last appearance
- MLB: September 23, 1998, for the Cleveland Indians
- NPB: October 10, 2000, for the Yakult Swallows

MLB statistics
- Win–loss record: 10–18
- Earned run average: 5.34
- Strikeouts: 141

NPB statistics
- Win–loss record: 20–12
- Earned run average: 3.97
- Strikeouts: 160
- Stats at Baseball Reference

Teams
- New York Mets (1994–1995); Kansas City Royals (1995–1997); Cleveland Indians (1997–1998); Yakult Swallows (1999–2000)

Jason James Jacome (born November 24, 1970) is an American former professional baseball pitcher from 1994 to 1998 for the New York Mets, Kansas City Royals, and Cleveland Indians. He also pitched two seasons in Japan for the Yakult Swallows in 1999 and 2000.
