= 1992 Major League Baseball All-Star Game =

1992 American baseball competition

	1	2	3	4	5	6	7	8	9	R	H	E
American League	4	1	1	0	0	4	0	3	0	13	19	1
National League	0	0	0	0	0	1	0	3	2	6	12	1
- Date: July 14, 1992
- Venue: Jack Murphy Stadium
- City: San Diego
- Managers: Tom Kelly (MIN); Bobby Cox (ATL)
- MVP: Ken Griffey Jr. (SEA)
- Attendance: 59,372
- Ceremonial first pitch: Ted Williams
- Television: CBS
- TV announcers: Sean McDonough and Tim McCarver
- Radio: CBS
- Radio announcers: John Rooney, Jerry Coleman and Johnny Bench

The 1992 Major League Baseball All-Star Game was the 63rd playing of the midsummer classic between the all-stars of the American League (AL) and National League (NL), the two leagues comprising Major League Baseball. The game was held on July 14, 1992, at Jack Murphy Stadium in San Diego, the home of the San Diego Padres of the National League. American vocal trio Wilson Phillips performed the Star-Spangled Banner during the opening ceremony. The game resulted in the American League defeating the National League 13–6.

In the eighth inning, Charles Nagy became the only pitcher to get a hit in an All-Star Game in the designated hitter era. It was a single, and he scored a few batters later.

This was the second All-Star Game to be held in San Diego and the final one at Jack Murphy Stadium. The next Midsummer Classic to be hosted by the Padres would come in 2016 at Petco Park.

== Rosters ==
Players in italics have since been inducted into the National Baseball Hall of Fame.

=== American League ===
Starters
Position	Player	Team	All-Star Games
P	Kevin Brown	Rangers	1
C	Sandy Alomar Jr.	Indians	3
1B	Mark McGwire	Athletics	6
2B	Roberto Alomar	Blue Jays	3
3B	Wade Boggs	Red Sox	8
SS	Cal Ripken Jr.	Orioles	10
OF	Joe Carter	Blue Jays	2
OF	Ken Griffey Jr.	Mariners	3
OF	Kirby Puckett	Twins	7

Pitchers
Position	Player	Team	All-Star Games
P	Rick Aguilera	Twins	2
P	Roger Clemens	Red Sox	5
P	Dennis Eckersley	Athletics	6
P	Juan Guzmán	Blue Jays	1
P	Mark Langston	Angels	3
P	Jack McDowell	White Sox	2
P	Jeff Montgomery	Royals	1
P	Mike Mussina	Orioles	1
P	Charles Nagy	Indians	1

Reserves
Position	Player	Team	All-Star Games
C	Iván Rodríguez	Rangers	1
2B	Carlos Baerga	Indians	1
2B	Chuck Knoblauch	Twins	1
3B	Edgar Martínez	Mariners	1
3B	Robin Ventura	White Sox	1
SS	Travis Fryman	Tigers	1
OF	Brady Anderson	Orioles	1
OF	José Canseco	Athletics	5
OF	Roberto Kelly	Yankees	1
OF	Rubén Sierra	Rangers	3
DH	Paul Molitor	Brewers	5

=== National League ===
Starters
Position	Player	Team	All-Star Games
P	Tom Glavine	Braves	2
C	Benito Santiago	Padres	4
1B	Fred McGriff	Padres	1
2B	Ryne Sandberg	Cubs	9
3B	Terry Pendleton	Braves	1
SS	Ozzie Smith	Cardinals	12
OF	Barry Bonds	Pirates	2
OF	Tony Gwynn	Padres	8
OF	Andy Van Slyke	Pirates	2

Pitchers
Position	Player	Team	All-Star Games
P	Norm Charlton	Reds	1
P	David Cone	Mets	2
P	Doug Jones	Astros	4
P	Greg Maddux	Cubs	2
P	Dennis Martínez	Expos	3
P	Lee Smith	Cardinals	4
P	John Smoltz	Braves	2
P	Bob Tewksbury	Cardinals	1

Reserves
Position	Player	Team	All-Star Games
C	Darren Daulton	Phillies	1
C	Tom Pagnozzi	Cardinals	1
1B	Will Clark	Giants	5
1B	John Kruk	Phillies	2
2B	Craig Biggio	Astros	2
2B	Mike Sharperson	Dodgers	1
3B	Gary Sheffield	Padres	1
SS	Tony Fernández	Padres	4
OF	Ron Gant	Braves	1
OF	Bip Roberts	Reds	1
OF	Larry Walker	Expos	1

== Game ==
=== Umpires ===
Home Plate	Doug Harvey (NL)
First Base	Rich Garcia (AL)
Second Base	Harry Wendelstedt (NL)
Third Base	Greg Kosc (AL)
Left Field	Tom Hallion (NL)
Right Field	Tim Tschida (AL)

Harvey, a California resident, was named crew chief to honor him for 31 seasons of service to the National League. He retired at the end of the 1992 season and was inducted into the Hall of Fame in 2010.

=== Starting lineups ===
American League				National League			
Order	Player	Team	Position	Order	Player	Team	Position
1	Roberto Alomar	Blue Jays	2B	1	Ozzie Smith	Cardinals	SS
2	Wade Boggs	Red Sox	3B	2	Tony Gwynn	Padres	RF
3	Kirby Puckett	Twins	LF	3	Barry Bonds	Pirates	LF
4	Joe Carter	Blue Jays	RF	4	Fred McGriff	Padres	1B
5	Mark McGwire	Athletics	1B	5	Terry Pendleton	Braves	3B
6	Cal Ripken Jr.	Orioles	SS	6	Andy Van Slyke	Pirates	CF
7	Ken Griffey Jr.	Mariners	CF	7	Ryne Sandberg	Cubs	2B
8	Sandy Alomar Jr.	Indians	C	8	Benito Santiago	Padres	C
9	Kevin Brown	Rangers	P	9	Tom Glavine	Braves	P

=== Game summary ===
Tuesday, July 14, 1992 5:35 pm (PT) at Jack Murphy Stadium in San Diego
Team	1	2	3	4	5	6	7	8	9	R	H	E
American League	4	1	1	0	0	4	0	3	0	13	19	1
National League	0	0	0	0	0	1	0	3	2	6	12	1
WP: Kevin Brown (1-0) LP: Tom Glavine (0-1); Home runs: AL: Ken Griffey Jr. (1), Rubén Sierra (1); NL: Will Clark (1)
