= Tony Fernandez =

Dominican baseball player (1962–2020)

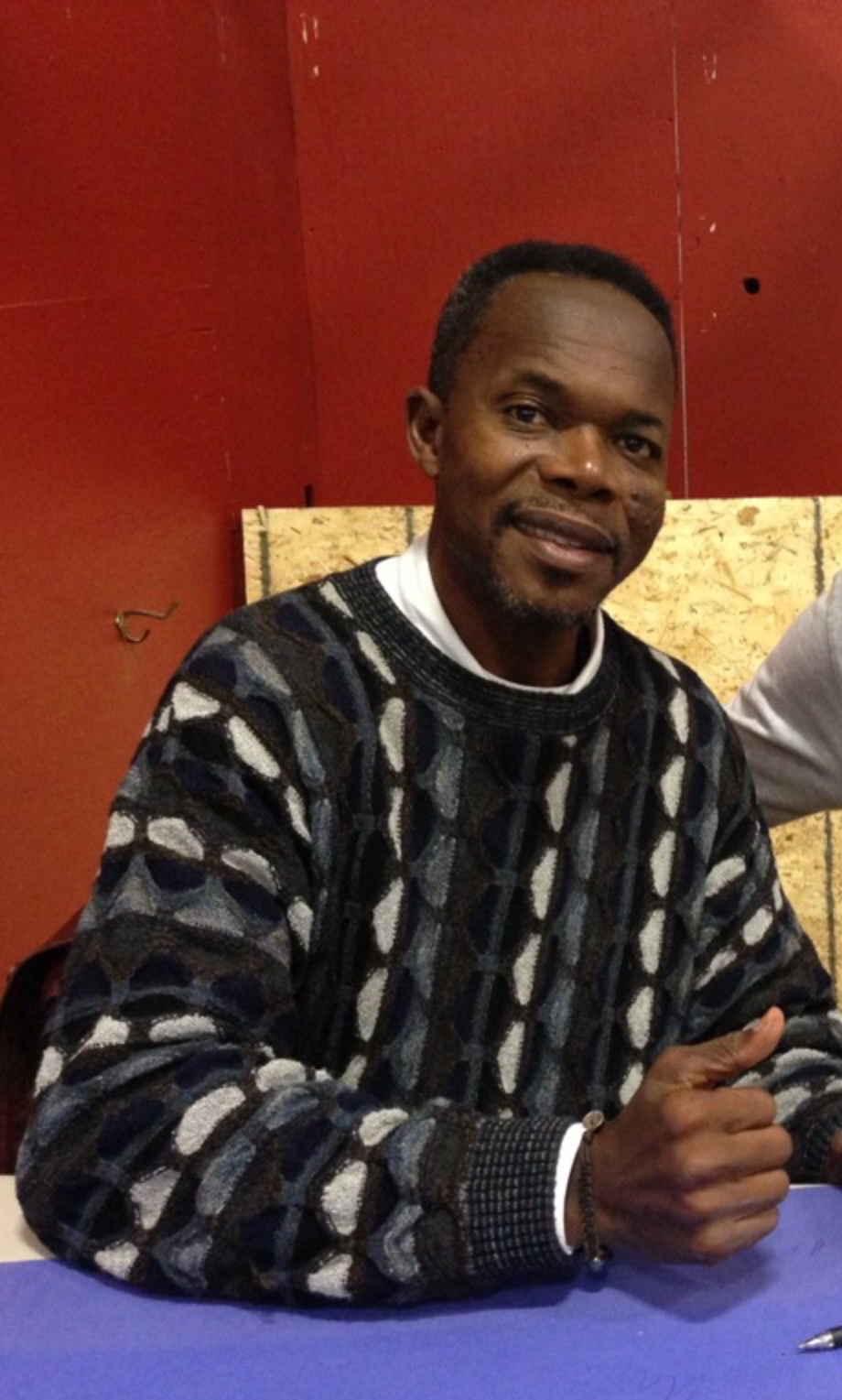
- Shortstop
- Born: June 30, 1962; San Pedro de Macorís, Dominican Republic
- Died: February 16, 2020 (aged 57); Weston, Florida, U.S.
- Batted: Switch Threw: Right

MLB debut
- September 2, 1983, for the Toronto Blue Jays

Last MLB appearance
- October 7, 2001, for the Toronto Blue Jays

MLB statistics
- Batting average: .288
- Hits: 2,276
- Home runs: 94
- Runs batted in: 844
- Stats at Baseball Reference

Teams
- Toronto Blue Jays (1983–1990); San Diego Padres (1991–1992); New York Mets (1993); Toronto Blue Jays (1993); Cincinnati Reds (1994); New York Yankees (1995); Cleveland Indians (1997); Toronto Blue Jays (1998–1999); Seibu Lions (2000); Milwaukee Brewers (2001); Toronto Blue Jays (2001)

Career highlights and awards
- 5× All-Star (1986, 1987, 1989, 1992, 1999); World Series champion (1993); 4× Gold Glove Award (1986–1989); Toronto Blue Jays Hall of Excellence

Member of the Canadian

Baseball Hall of Fame
- Induction: 2008

Octavio Antonio Fernández Castro (June 30, 1962 – February 16, 2020), better known as Tony Fernandez, was a Dominican professional baseball player who played as a shortstop in Major League Baseball (MLB) for seven teams from 1983 to 2001, most notably the Toronto Blue Jays. A five-time All-Star, Fernandez was known for his defensive skills, winning four consecutive Gold Glove Awards (1986–1989). He batted over .300 four times, led the major leagues with 17 triples in 1990, collected 30 doubles six times and 20 stolen bases seven times. He also led American League shortstops in assists three times, and in putouts and fielding average twice each. After moving to the National League in a blockbuster trade following the 1990 season, he returned to the Blue Jays in a mid-season trade in 1993, and played a major role in helping the club repeat as World Series champions, batting .333 with nine runs batted in during the series.

== Early life ==
Fernandez was born in San Pedro de Macorís, Dominican Republic. He was scouted by the Toronto Blue Jays' Latin America scout Epy Guerrero and was signed as an undrafted free agent in 1979.

== Career ==
Promoted to the Blue Jays in 1983, Fernandez became the team's full-time shortstop in 1985, and contributed significantly to the team winning its first division title that year. Fernandez continued to star for the Jays for several years afterwards. His 213 hits in 1986 were, at the time, a major league single-season record for a shortstop.

Before the 1991 season, Fernandez was traded to the San Diego Padres in a deal that also sent Jays star Fred McGriff to San Diego in exchange for Roberto Alomar and Joe Carter. Fernandez played for San Diego for two years. After the 1992 season, the Padres traded him to the New York Mets for D. J. Dozier, Wally Whitehurst, and a player to be named later. After a disappointing start to the 1993 season, the Mets traded him back to the Blue Jays for Darrin Jackson. He played well for the remainder of the season and was instrumental in helping the Blue Jays win the 1993 World Series against the Philadelphia Phillies. In that World Series, Fernandez drove in nine runs, a record for a shortstop.

Before the 1995 season, Fernandez signed a two-year contract with the New York Yankees. It was because of an injury early in the season to Fernandez that Derek Jeter was called up to the major leagues for the first time. Fernandez injured his elbow during spring training in 1996, and missed the entire season. When Fernandez left the Yankees, he would end up becoming the last Yankees player to wear #6, as it would be worn by manager Joe Torre in 1996 and end up being retired for him in 2014.

Tony Fernandez is a member of the Toronto Blue Jays' Level of Excellence.

Fernandez signed with the Cleveland Indians for the 1997 season. Thanks in large part to his own game-winning home run against Baltimore in the American League Championship Series—the only 1–0 game in MLB postseason history with an extra-innings home run—he played in the 1997 World Series with the Indians. In Game 7 of the World Series against the Florida Marlins, Fernandez hit a two-run single in the top of the third inning for the Indians' only runs of the game, and was in position to be credited with the Series-winning hit for Cleveland, had they won the game. However, in the bottom of the 11th inning, Fernandez committed an error on a potential double play ball while playing at second base, and the eventual World Series-winning run was put on base as a result.

In 1998, he rejoined the Blue Jays, and revitalized his hitting, batting over .300 in two seasons there. In 2000, Fernandez played for the Seibu Lions in Japan before returning to the majors the following year. When he returned in 2001, he briefly played for the Milwaukee Brewers but returned to Toronto late in the season, and retired at its conclusion.

A very thin man, Fernandez had a tilted, wavering batting stance that made it appear as if he might not be strong enough to hold his bat. From early in his career he carried a scar on his right cheek from a pitched ball. Fernandez was a noted fitness fanatic.

Early in his career, Fernandez was well known for his exceptional defensive skills at shortstop, and was described by Ivan Maisel in a Sports Illustrated article as having "the range of a Texas cattleman". He was especially famous for leaping into the air while simultaneously making an underhanded throw to first base, on balls hit far to his right.

Fernandez was awarded four consecutive Gold Glove Awards for his defense, from 1986 to 1989. Fernandez was also named to five All-Star teams. He finished his career with a .288 batting average in 2,158 games played, and batted .327 in postseason play. Fernandez hit for the cycle as a New York Yankee on September 3, 1995, against the Oakland Athletics. He set a nine-year record for shortstops with a .992 fielding percentage in 1989, while still holding the single-season fielding percentage record for third basemen with .991 in 1994.

On October 17, 2016, Fernandez was inducted into the Ontario Sports Hall of Fame at the Sheraton Centre Toronto Hotel, where he thanked the fans in Toronto, Ontario and in Canada for embracing him.

== Illness and death ==
Fernandez announced in 2017 he had been diagnosed with polycystic kidney disease. On February 16, 2020, he died at a hospital in Weston, Florida following complications with a stroke, pneumonia, and an induced coma. His remains were returned home to San Pedro de Macorís and buried in the Municipal Cemetery.

== See also ==
- List of Major League Baseball career hits leaders
- List of Major League Baseball career runs scored leaders
- List of Major League Baseball annual triples leaders
- List of Major League Baseball players to hit for the cycle

Achievements
Preceded by Gregg Jefferies	Hitting for the cycle September 3, 1995	Succeeded by John Mabry
