= Einar Díaz =

Panamanian baseball player and coach (born 1972)

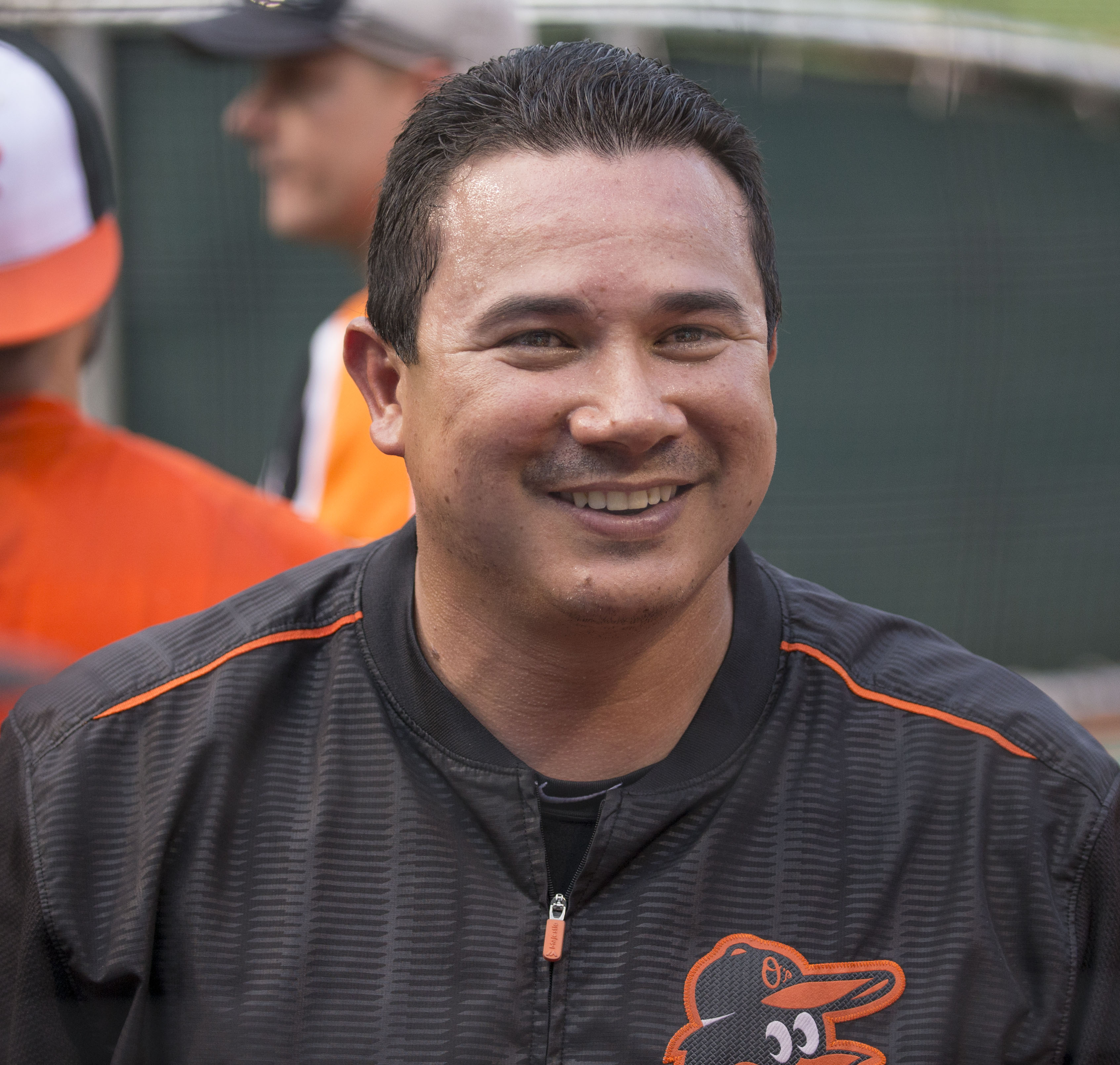
- Díaz with the Baltimore Orioles
- Catcher
- Born: December 28, 1972 (age 53); Chiriquí Province, Panama
- Batted: Right Threw: Right

MLB debut
- September 9, 1996, for the Cleveland Indians

Last MLB appearance
- September 16, 2006, for the Los Angeles Dodgers

MLB statistics
- Batting average: .254
- Home runs: 21
- Runs batted in: 202
- Stats at Baseball Reference

Teams
- Cleveland Indians (1996–2002); Texas Rangers (2003); Montreal Expos (2004); St. Louis Cardinals (2005); Los Angeles Dodgers (2006)

Einar Antonio Díaz (born December 28, 1972) is a Panamanian professional baseball player and coach currently a coach for the AAA Gwinnett Stripers. Díaz played in Major League Baseball (MLB) as a catcher for the Cleveland Indians, Texas Rangers, Montreal Expos, St. Louis Cardinals, and Los Angeles Dodgers from 1996 through 2006.

== Playing career ==
Díaz was called up in 1996 by the Cleveland Indians to back up then-starting catcher Sandy Alomar Jr. He played sparingly from 1996-1998, and in 1999 he got his first starting job with the Indians due to an injury to Alomar. From 2001-2002, Díaz was the primary starting catcher for the Cleveland Indians. Following the 2002 season, he was traded to the Texas Rangers to replace All-Star catcher Iván Rodríguez, who left for free agency. This was the last starting job Díaz would see. He continued his career as a backup catcher with the Montreal Expos in 2004, the St. Louis Cardinals in 2005, and the minor league Buffalo Bisons in 2006.

Díaz made a pitching appearance for the Bisons on June 4, 2006, and was the losing pitcher of record that game.

Díaz never played with the Indians in his second stint with the organization in 2006. On August 12, 2006, he was traded to the Los Angeles Dodgers (as the Dodgers were in need of another backup catcher after Sandy Alomar Jr. was traded). Díaz would only compile 3 at-bats as a Dodger, collecting 2 hits in those 3 at-bats.

At the conclusion of the 2006 season, Díaz signed a minor league contract with the Pittsburgh Pirates and was assigned to their Indianapolis Triple-A club at the end of 2007 spring training. On June 30, 2007, while scoring from third on a Brad Eldred multiple RBI hit, Díaz suffered a total rupture of his patellar tendon when he crossed home plate, forcing him to miss the remainder of the season.

== Coaching career ==
Diaz retired at the end of the 2007 season. He was invited to the Cleveland Indians spring training camp in Winter Haven in 2008 as a special assistant for catchers, and later became a field coach for the Gulf Coast Orioles in the Baltimore Orioles minor league system. On January 12, 2009, the Orioles named him the manager of the Rookie League Bluefield Orioles. He was previously the batting coach for the Delmarva Shorebirds. The Orioles promoted Diaz to assistant hitting coach on April 1, 2013. The entire coaching staff was fired after the 2018 season.

Diaz was named as a coach for the AAA Gwinnett Stripers for the 2019 season.

He was named hitting coach of the FCL Braves the rookie league affiliate of the Atlanta Braves for the 2025 season.
