= Jaret Wright =

American baseball player (born 1975)

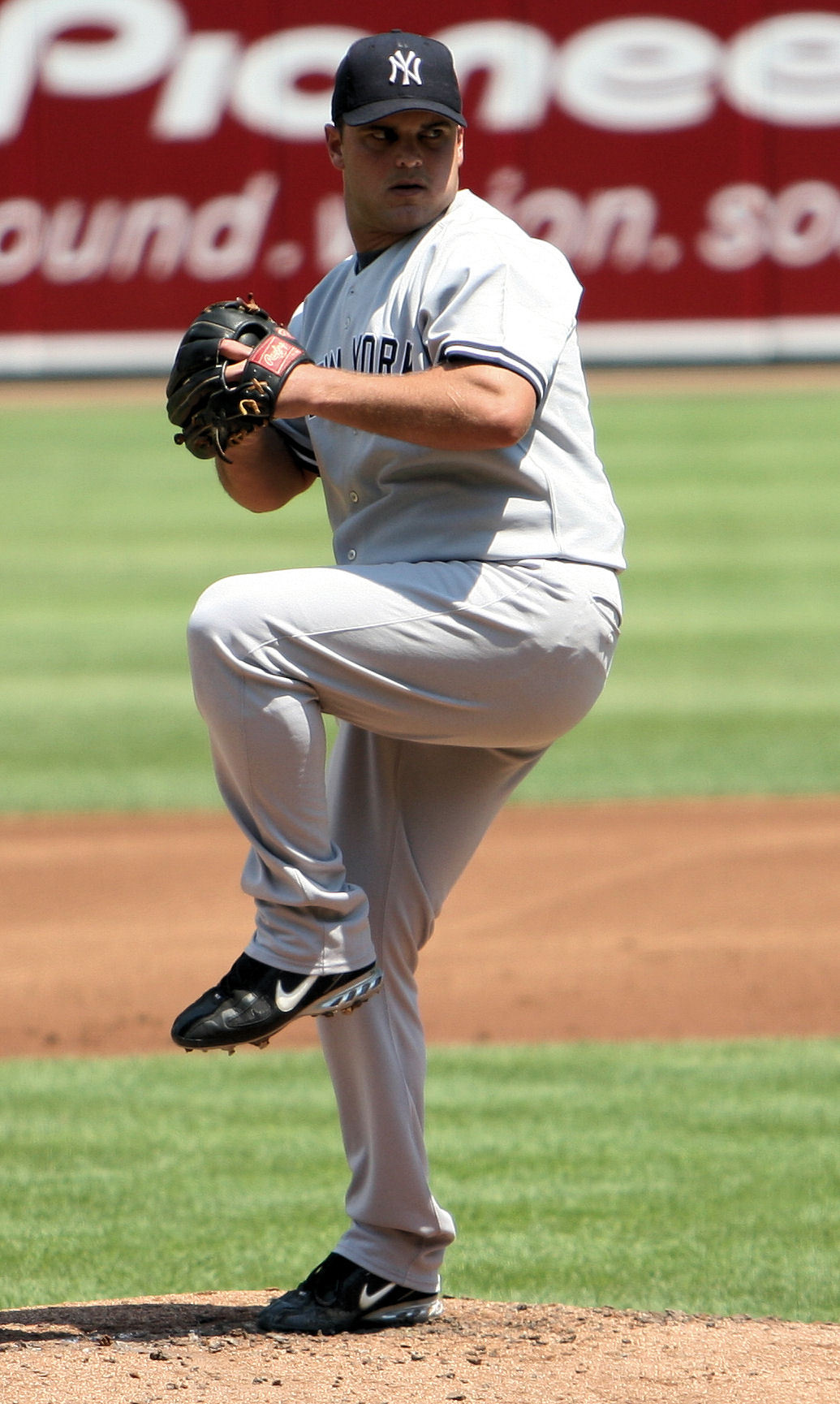
- Wright with the New York Yankees
- Pitcher
- Born: December 29, 1975 (age 50); Anaheim, California, U.S.
- Batted: Right Threw: Right

MLB debut
- June 24, 1997, for the Cleveland Indians

Last MLB appearance
- April 29, 2007, for the Baltimore Orioles

MLB statistics
- Win–loss record: 68–60
- Earned run average: 5.09
- Strikeouts: 694
- Stats at Baseball Reference

Teams
- Cleveland Indians (1997–2002); San Diego Padres (2003); Atlanta Braves (2003–2004); New York Yankees (2005–2006); Baltimore Orioles (2007)

Jaret Samuel Wright (born December 29, 1975) is an American former professional baseball pitcher. He played all or parts of 11 seasons in Major League Baseball for the Cleveland Indians, San Diego Padres, Atlanta Braves, New York Yankees, and Baltimore Orioles, primarily as a starting pitcher.

== Early life and education ==
Wright was born on December 29, 1975, in Anaheim, California, and is the son of Clyde Wright, who himself pitched for nine seasons in the major leagues and three seasons in Nippon Professional Baseball. Wright graduated from Katella High School in Anaheim, where he also played quarterback and linebacker for the football team. He was named league MVP and Orange County High School Player of the Year.

== Professional career ==
The Cleveland Indians selected Wright in the first round, with the 10th overall pick, of the 1994 Major League Baseball draft. Following the draft, Wright began his professional career with the Burlington Indians, the team's rookie league affiliate in the Appalachian League. The 18-year-old started in four games and had a 5.40 earned run average (ERA).

In 1995, Wright progressed to the Class A Columbus RedStixx in the South Atlantic League, where he went 5–6 with a 3.00 ERA in 24 games. In 1996, he moved up to the Kinston Indians, the team's "High-A" affiliate in the Carolina League. He went 7–4 in 19 starts, with a 2.50 ERA. Baseball America rated Wright as its #22 prospect and was regularly mentioned by the Cleveland front office as one of the organization's top prospects.

The following year, 1997, was a breakout season for Wright. He started with the Akron Aeros, the Double-A in the Eastern League, where he went 3–3 with a 3.67 ERA. He was quickly promoted to the Triple-A Buffalo Bisons, going 4–1 in 7 starts and sported an impressive 1.80 ERA. On June 3, he pitched a 7-inning, 2-hit shutout against the Indianapolis Indians. That earned Wright a promotion to the big club when a spot opened up.

=== Major leagues ===
Wright made his major league debut in 1997 with the Indians. Wright found instant success. He posted an 8–3 record with a 4.38 ERA in 16 starts, and also pitched effectively in the postseason. In the deciding seventh game of the 1997 World Series, the Indians opted to start Wright over the more experienced Charles Nagy. Wright left the game after 6 1/3 innings with a 2–1 lead; however, the Indians lost in 11 innings. Wright finished fifth in the American League Rookie of the Year Award voting.

Wright had a 12–10 record and a 4.72 ERA in 1998. He suffered from a shoulder injury in 1999, when he went 8–10 with a 6.06 ERA in 26 starts. The injury required two surgeries to repair, costing him parts of the following three seasons.

After Wright went 2–3 with a 15.71 ERA in 2002, the Indians decided not to re-sign him, and he became a free agent. Wright then signed with the San Diego Padres in early 2003. He went 1–5 with an 8.73 ERA in 39 games, all in relief and was traded to the Atlanta Braves in August. After going 1–0 with a 2.00 ERA and not allowing a run in 10 out of his 11 appearances, he was told that he was going to be made a starting pitcher again for the next season.

Wright started 2004 in the minors to build up arm strength, but was called up by the Braves when it was discovered pitcher Paul Byrd needed more time to rehab his arm (he had missed the entire 2003 season due to Tommy John surgery). Wright became the Braves best pitcher that season, going 15–8 with a 3.28 ERA in 32 starts while amassing 159 strikeouts in 186 1/3 innings pitched.

In December 2004, Wright signed a three-year, US$21 million deal with the New York Yankees.

On November 12, 2006, the Yankees traded Wright to the Baltimore Orioles for Chris Britton and cash considerations. The Orioles were responsible for paying only $3 million of the $7 million left on Wright's contract.

Wright's shoulder problems returned in the 2007 season and caused him to spend time on the disabled list twice; he did make three starts in April, each five innings or less, but lost all three of them and accumulated a 6.97 ERA. Wright had started a rehab assignment in September and after 3 games he decided to go home ending the rest of the season. On October 1, 2007, the Orioles released Wright.

On January 23, 2008, Wright signed a minor league contract with the Pittsburgh Pirates, which included an invitation to spring training. At the end of spring training, he declined his assignment to the minor leagues and elected to become a free agent. He went unsigned, and never pitched professionally again.

== Coaching career ==
In January 2023, Wright was named as the pitching coach of the Windy City ThunderBolts of the Frontier League. The job was his first professional coaching role.

== See also ==
- List of second-generation Major League Baseball players
