= Terry Clark (baseball) =

American baseball player (born 1960)

- Pitcher
- Born: October 18, 1960 (age 65); Los Angeles, California, U.S.
- Batted: Right Threw: Right

MLB debut
- July 7, 1988, for the California Angels

Last MLB appearance
- September 20, 1997, for the Texas Rangers

MLB statistics
- Win–loss record: 10–23
- Earned run average: 5.54
- Strikeouts: 109
- Stats at Baseball Reference

Teams
- California Angels (1988–1989); Houston Astros (1990); Atlanta Braves (1995); Baltimore Orioles (1995); Kansas City Royals (1996); Houston Astros (1996); Cleveland Indians (1997); Texas Rangers (1997)

Terry Lee Clark (born October 18, 1960) is an American former Major League Baseball player. A pitcher, Clark played for the California Angels in 1988 and 1989, Houston Astros in 1990 and 1996, Baltimore Orioles and Atlanta Braves in 1995, Kansas City Royals in 1996, and Texas Rangers and Cleveland Indians in 1997. Clark notched 10 victories as a pitcher and on August 18, 1995, picked up his only MLB save against the Athletics.

From 2000 to 2004, Clark was a pitching coach in the Cleveland Indians minor league system for Single-A Mahoning Valley, Double-A Akron, and Triple-A Buffalo. From 2006 to 2008, he was the pitching coach for Double-A Frisco in the Rangers organization. On December 29, 2008, he was named the pitching coach for Triple-A Oklahoma City. He was also the Seattle Mariners' Minor League pitching coordinator 2014–2015, then in 2016 hired as the Chicago Cubs pitching coach at Tennessee.

His son, Matt Clark, is also a former professional baseball player.
