= Chad Ogea =

American baseball player (born 1970)

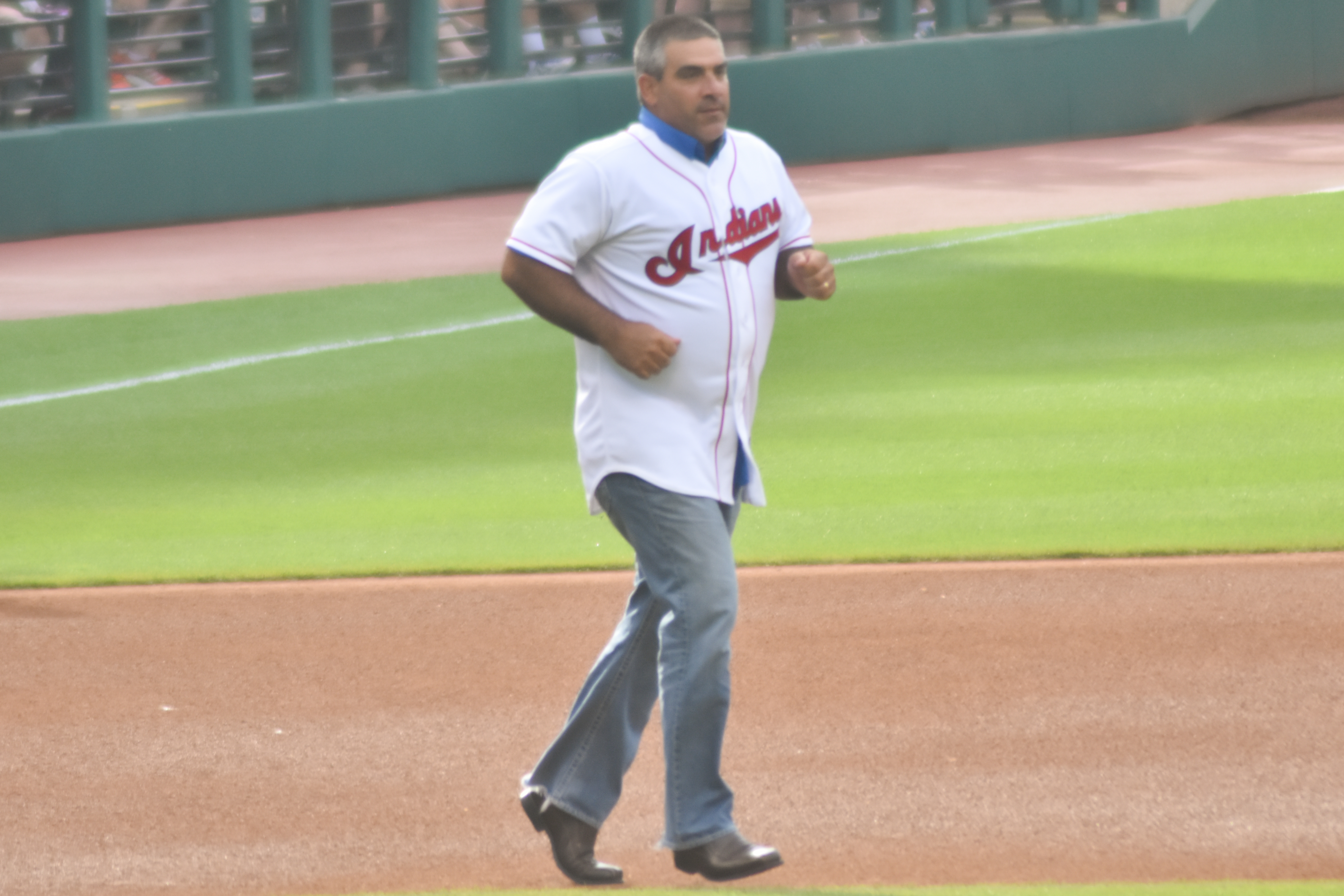
- Pitcher
- Born: November 9, 1970 (age 55); Lake Charles, Louisiana, U.S.
- Batted: Right Threw: Right

MLB debut
- May 3, 1994, for the Cleveland Indians

Last MLB appearance
- October 2, 1999, for the Philadelphia Phillies

MLB statistics
- Win–loss record: 37–35
- Earned run average: 4.88
- Strikeouts: 369
- Stats at Baseball Reference

Teams
- Cleveland Indians (1994–1998); Philadelphia Phillies (1999)

Chad Wayne Ogea (/ˈoʊdʒeɪ/; born November 9, 1970) is an American former Major League Baseball pitcher. He made his MLB debut in 1994 and played his final game in 1999.

== Professional playing career ==
Ogea played his first five major league seasons with the Cleveland Indians and his final season with the Philadelphia Phillies. He may best be remembered for his surprising hitting ability in the 1997 World Series against the Florida Marlins.

== 1997 World Series ==
Ogea, having lost two games in the ALCS and winning no games in June, July, or August, managed to win two World Series games, both of them against Marlins ace Kevin Brown. In that Series, he gave up just two earned runs for an ERA of 1.54. Batting in Game 6 against Brown, Ogea managed to get his first hit since high school, knocking in two runs in the process. Later, he hit a double to lead off the 5th inning. He would score on Manny Ramírez's sacrifice fly. He became the first pitcher since Mickey Lolich to drive in two World Series runs and the first Cleveland Indians pitcher to drive in a World Series run since 1920.
