= Charles Nagy =

American baseball player (born 1967)

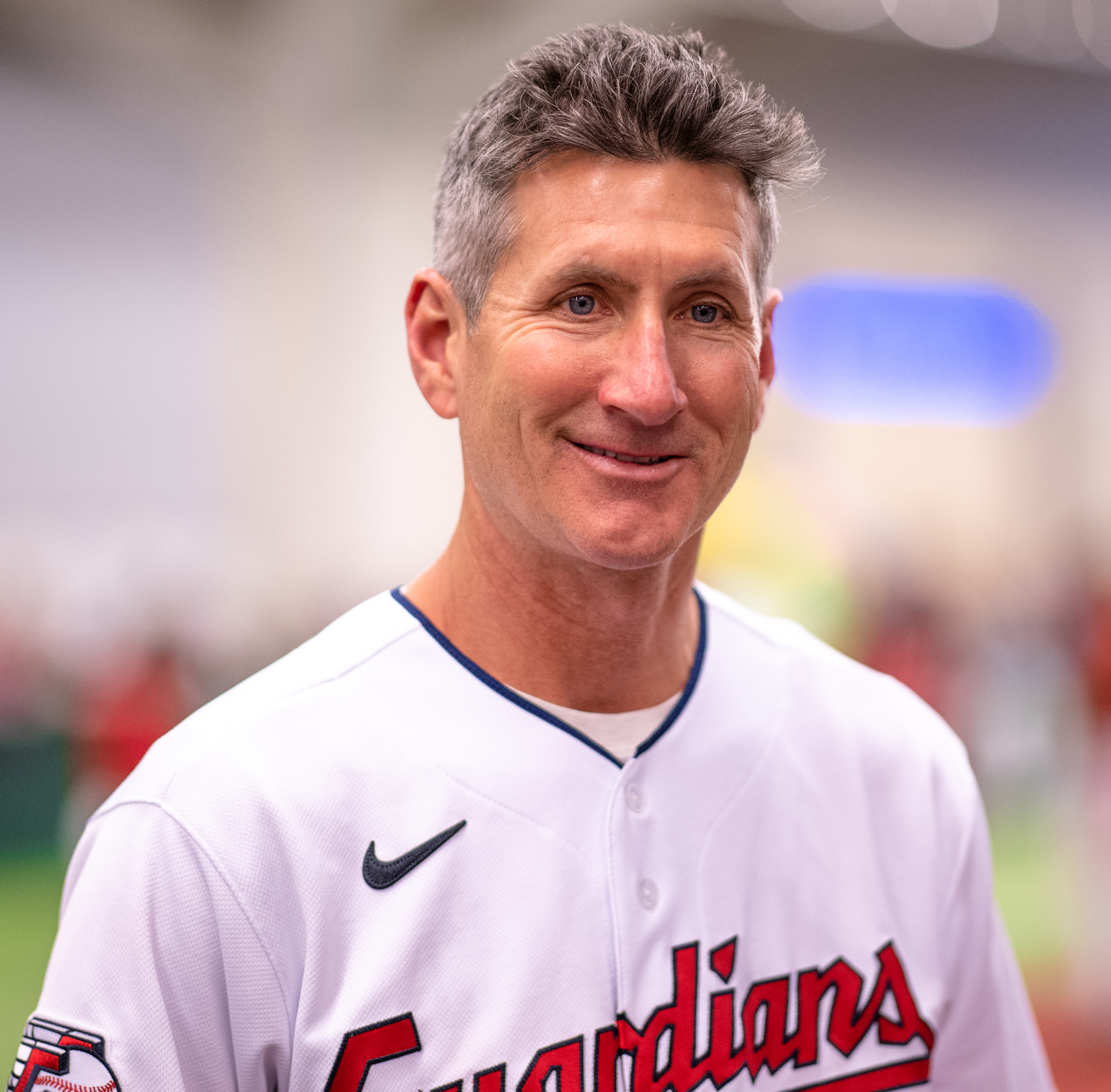
- Nagy in 2023
- Pitcher
- Born: May 5, 1967 (age 59); Bridgeport, Connecticut, U.S.
- Batted: Left Threw: Right

MLB debut
- June 29, 1990, for the Cleveland Indians

Last MLB appearance
- June 1, 2003, for the San Diego Padres

MLB statistics
- Win–loss record: 129–105
- Earned run average: 4.51
- Strikeouts: 1,242
- Stats at Baseball Reference

Teams
- As player: Cleveland Indians (1990–2002); San Diego Padres (2003); As coach: Arizona Diamondbacks (2011–2013); Los Angeles Angels (2016–2018)

Career highlights and awards
- 3× All-Star (1992, 1996, 1999); Cleveland Guardians Hall of Fame
Medals
Men's baseball
Representing United States
Olympic Games
Gold medal – first place	1988 Seoul	Team
Baseball World Cup
Silver medal – second place	1988 Rome	Team

Charles Harrison Nagy (/ˈnæɡi/ NAG-ee; born May 5, 1967) is an American former Major League Baseball All-Star right-handed pitcher who played for 14 seasons in the major leagues from 1990 to 2003. He played for the Cleveland Indians and San Diego Padres. He served as the pitching coach for the Arizona Diamondbacks from 2011 to 2013 and the Los Angeles Angels from 2016 to 2018.

== Early life and amateur career ==
Nagy was born on May 5, 1967, in Bridgeport, Connecticut. He is of Hungarian ancestry. Nagy attended Roger Ludlowe High School in Fairfield, Connecticut, where he starred in baseball and football.

Nagy attended the University of Connecticut. Playing for the Huskies, he ranked second and eighth all-time for strikeouts in a single season (113, 81) and fifth for his career (194). His single-season marks for the Huskies (entering the 2011 season) include tied for third in complete games (8), tied for sixth in saves (4), and 17th in innings pitched (86 1/3). He was the first Huskies player drafted in the first round and the first to be named the Big East Pitcher of the Year, which he won twice (for the 1987 and 1988 seasons).

In 1987, he played collegiate summer baseball with the Harwich Mariners of the Cape Cod Baseball League, and was playoff MVP of Harwich's league championship squad.

Nagy was a member of the U.S. national team that competed in the 1988 Summer Olympics as a demonstration sport. Nagy made 19 appearances for the U.S., going 3–1 with a 1.05 ERA and a team-leading six saves. He appeared in two games in the Olympics, pitching 2.0 innings and earning a save. Team USA defeated defending champion Japan to win the tournament and gold medal. However, since baseball was a demonstration sport, the medals did not count in the respective nations' medal totals.

== Professional career ==
Nagy was taken in the first round as the 17th overall pick by the Cleveland Indians during the 1988 Major League Baseball draft. He was selected as a compensation pick from the San Francisco Giants for the signing of Brett Butler. Nagy was the second of three first round picks selected by the Indians, sandwiched between shortstop Mark Lewis and pitcher Jeff Mutis. Being a successful college pitcher, Nagy skipped several levels and was assigned to the Kinston Indians, the Cleveland High A affiliate in the Carolina League. He posted an 8–4 record and 1.51 earned run average (ERA) with 99 strikeouts in 95 1/3 innings over 13 starts. He was quickly promoted to Canton–Akron Indians, the Double-A affiliate in the Eastern League. Nagy finished with a 4–5 record and a 3.35 ERA in 15 starts. After the season, Baseball America rated him as the #27 prospect.

Nagy returned to the so-called "little Indians" for the start of the 1990 season, where he went 13–8 with a 2.52 ERA in 23 starts. He was soon called up to Cleveland, making his big league debut on June 29, 1990, a 7–2 loss to the California Angels. He would end with a 2-4 record and a 5.91 ERA in 9 starts. In 1991, he finished 10–5 with a 4.13 ERA, and tied for eighth in the American League Rookie of the Year Award for 1991. On August 8, 1992, he threw a complete game one-hitter against the Baltimore Orioles, giving up just a single in the seventh inning, while allowing two walks.

1992 was possibly Nagy's best year statistically as he finished the season with an impressive 2.96 ERA and a career high 252 innings pitched. He had ten complete games. His win-loss record was 17–10, including three shutouts. In the All-Star Game, Nagy batted in the 8th inning because there were no position players remaining to pinch-hit. Nagy hit an infield single off Doug Jones while wearing a Texas Rangers batting helmet. He scored on a single by Travis Fryman. Nagy was the 19th pitcher to get a hit in the All-Star Game, and is the only pitcher to record a hit in the All-Star Game in the designated hitter era.

On May 15, 1993, Nagy left a game against the Milwaukee Brewers with a shoulder injury after pitching to just two batters. He was a miserable 2–6 at that point and underwent surgery for a torn labrum on June 29, shutting him down for the 1993 season. He rebounded in 1994 with a respectable 10–8 record with a 3.45 ERA during the strike-shortened season.

During the 1995 season, Nagy led the staff with a 16–6 and a 4.55 ERA, as the Indians returned to the World Series for the first time since 1954. He pitched well in the division and league championship series, giving up two earned runs in 15 innings, but surrendered five earned runs in seven innings in Game 3 of the 1995 World Series. The next year, 1996, was among his best; he recorded a 17–5 record and a 3.41 ERA, and he finished fourth in AL Cy Young Award voting.

In the 1997 World Series, Nagy was the Game 3 starter. He gave up 5 earned runs in six innings. In Game 7, after a blown save by closer José Mesa, Nagy was brought in in the 10th inning. In the bottom of the 11th inning, Nagy gave up a bases-loaded single to Édgar Rentería that appeared to graze off his outstretched glove to end the game and the series, pinning Nagy with the loss.

In 1999, Nagy batted twice in a game against Toronto, after a mistake with the initial lineup card cost the Indians their designated hitter. As of 2021, he is one of only eight different pitchers to have batted more than once in a nine-inning game that used the designated hitter rule.

During this period from 1995 through 1999, Nagy was the workhorse of the Tribe pitching staff, amassing 15 or more wins each season, a feat only matched by Greg Maddux. However, Nagy was placed on the disabled list (DL) on May 16, 2000, snapping a streak of 192 consecutive starts dating back to October 3, 1993. On May 19, 2000, he underwent arthroscopic surgery to remove bone chips from his elbow. He returned to make three starts in September, but was shut down after three losses and persistent pain. He would get just six more wins from 2001 through 2003.

Despite a solid spring training and not missing a turn in the spring rotation, Nagy started the 2001 season on the disabled list, as the Indians felt he needed to build strength in his surgically repaired elbow. He did not come off of the DL on June 1.

Nagy's last season, 2003, was with the San Diego Padres. He finished sixth on Cleveland's all-time strikeout leader list (1,235), 10th in wins (129), and 11th in innings pitched (1,942 1/3).

== Post-playing career ==
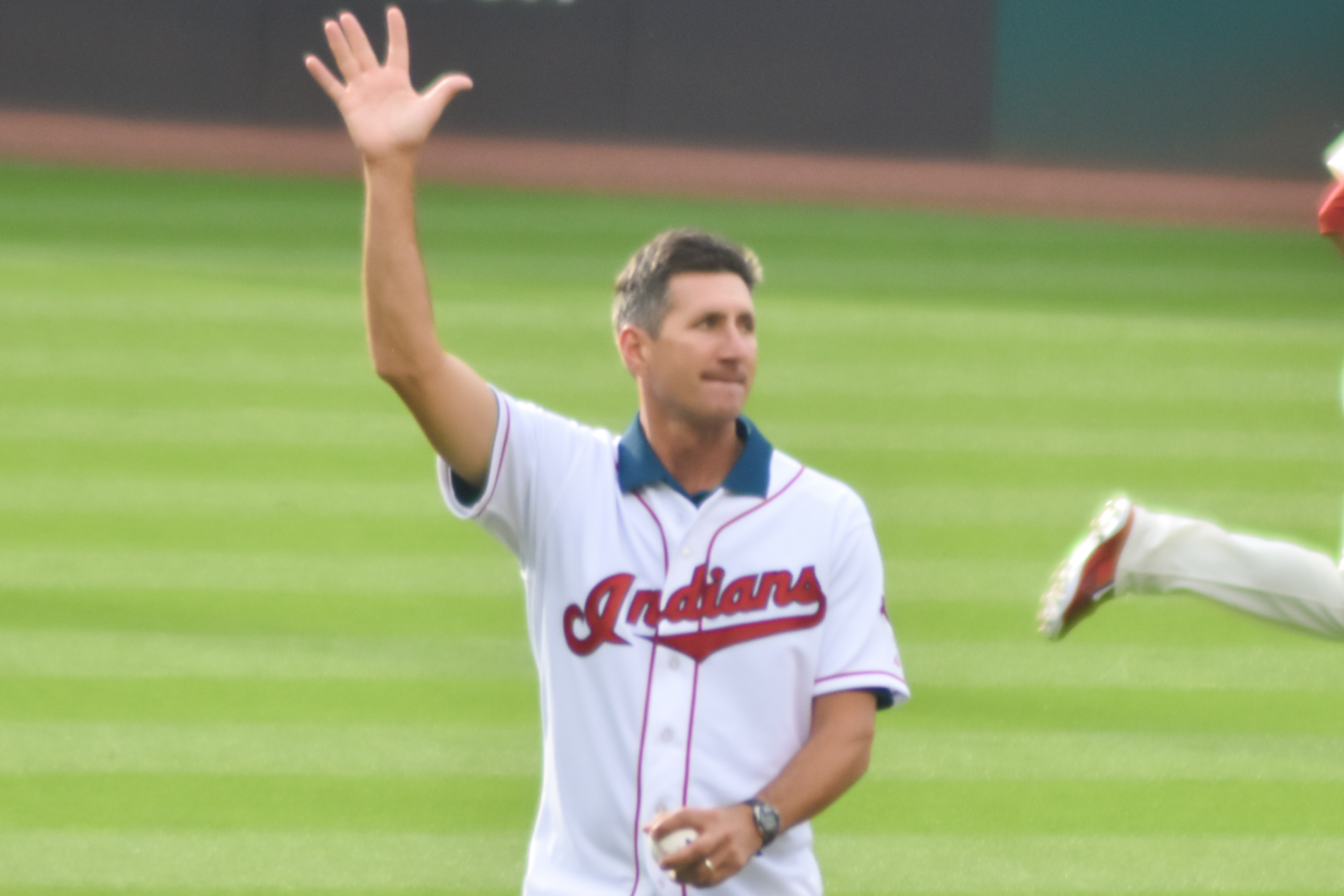
Nagy in 2015

Nagy was inducted in the Kinston Professional Baseball Hall of Fame in 2004, and the Cleveland Indians Team Hall of Fame on August 11, 2007.

In 2009, Nagy was named the pitching coach of the Cleveland Indians' Triple-A team, the Columbus Clippers.

On October 26, 2010, Nagy was named pitching coach of the Arizona Diamondbacks. He was fired by general manager Kevin Towers on October 7, 2013 partly for refusing to instruct pitchers to hit players on opposing teams. It was duly noted by journalists that the Diamondbacks pitchers actually hit 60 batters last season, while their batters were only hit 43 times.

In February 2015, Nagy was hired again by the Cleveland Indians as Special Assistant to Player Development along with Travis Hafner and John McDonald.

On November 2, 2015, Nagy was named the pitching coach of the Los Angeles Angels. He was replaced after the 2018 season.

== Personal life ==
Nagy and his wife have two daughters. They live outside of San Diego in Rancho Santa Fe, California.

Nagy established an endowed baseball scholarship at UConn with a gift of $100,000.

Preceded by Randy Johnson	American League All-Star Game Starting Pitcher; 1996	Succeeded by Randy Johnson
Preceded by Mel Stottlemyre Jr.	Arizona Diamondbacks pitching coach 2011–2013	Succeeded by Mike Harkey
Preceded by Mike Butcher	Los Angeles Angels Pitching Coach; 2016–2018	Succeeded by Doug White
