= Sandy Alomar Jr. =

Puerto Rican baseball player and coach (born 1966)

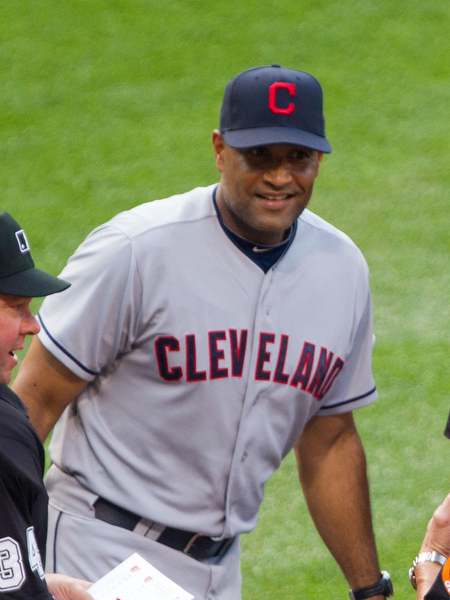
- Alomar with the Cleveland Indians in 2012

Cleveland Guardians – No. 15
- Catcher / Coach
- Born: June 18, 1966 (age 59); Salinas, Puerto Rico
- Batted: Right Threw: Right

MLB debut
- September 30, 1988, for the San Diego Padres

Last MLB appearance
- September 30, 2007, for the New York Mets

MLB statistics
- Batting average: .273
- Home runs: 112
- Runs batted in: 588
- Managerial record: 3–3
- Winning %: .500
- Stats at Baseball Reference

Teams
- As player: San Diego Padres (1988–1989); Cleveland Indians (1990–2000); Chicago White Sox (2001–2002); Colorado Rockies (2002); Chicago White Sox (2003–2004); Texas Rangers (2005); Los Angeles Dodgers (2006); Chicago White Sox (2006); New York Mets (2007); As manager: Cleveland Indians (2012); As coach: New York Mets (2008–2009); Cleveland Indians / Guardians (2010–present)

Career highlights and awards
- 6× All-Star (1990–1992, 1996–1998); AL Rookie of the Year (1990); Gold Glove Award (1990); Cleveland Guardians Hall of Fame

Santos Alomar Velázquez (Spanish pronunciation: [aloˈmaɾ], /ˈæləmɑːr/; born June 18, 1966), known as Sandy Alomar Jr., is a Puerto Rican former professional baseball player, coach, and manager. He played in Major League Baseball as a catcher between 1988 and 2007, most notably as a member of the Cleveland Indians where he was a six-time All-Star player and won two American League pennants. Alomar was inducted into the Cleveland Indians Hall of Fame in 2009.

He also played for the San Diego Padres, Chicago White Sox, Colorado Rockies, Texas Rangers, Los Angeles Dodgers, and the New York Mets. He is the son of former major league player Sandy Alomar Sr. and the brother of Hall of Fame second baseman Roberto Alomar.

== Major league career ==
Alomar was a highly regarded catcher in the San Diego organization after being named Baseball America Minor League Player of the Year in both 1988 and 1989, but he was blocked behind Benito Santiago at the Major League level. After two short call-ups with the Padres, he finally got his chance at an everyday job after being traded to Cleveland after the 1989 season along with Carlos Baerga and Chris James, in exchange for power-hitter Joe Carter. Once in Cleveland, he established his reputation as a skilled defensive player by becoming the first rookie catcher to start an All-Star game, as well as winning both Rookie of the Year honors and a Gold Glove Award. He became the third catcher in Major League history to win a Gold Glove Award in his rookie season, joining Johnny Bench and Carlton Fisk.

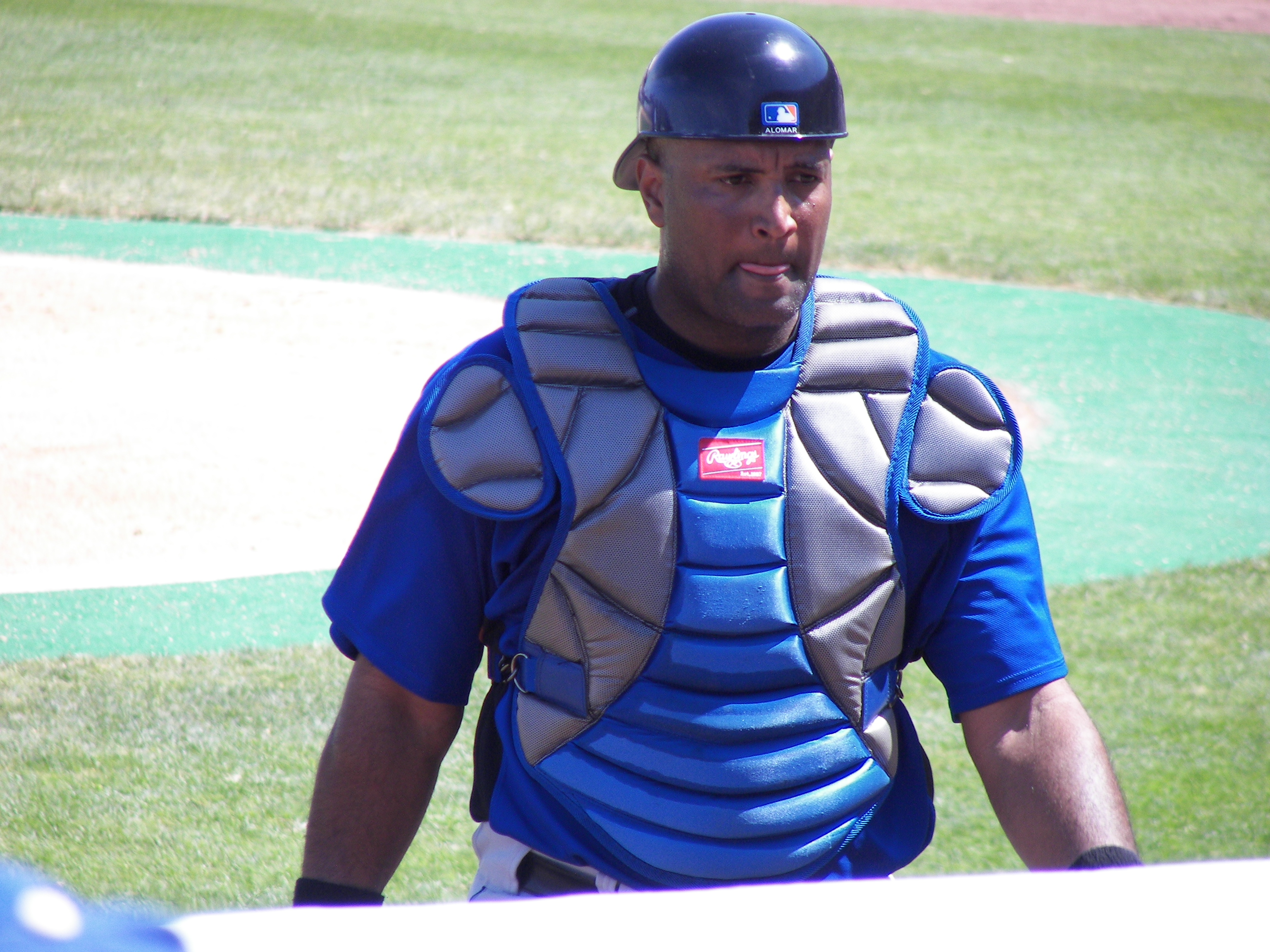
Alomar during his tenure with the New York Mets in 2007.

Alomar was selected as an All-Star in 1991 and 1992. However, his 1991 season was largely lost due to injuries, and he finished the year with no home runs and only seven RBIs in 199 at-bats. Over the next few years, Alomar suffered several injuries and failed to realize his potential. He came back strong in the first half of 1996 to make his fourth All-Star team, but then faded in the second half.

In 1997, everything finally came together for Alomar. He batted .324 and was the MVP of the All-Star game in his home ballpark (Jacobs Field), hitting a game-deciding two-run home run off Shawn Estes to the left field bleachers in the bottom of the seventh inning of a 3–1 American League win; he was the first player to hit an All-Star game home run in his home stadium since Hank Aaron in 1972. He also put together a 30-game hitting streak (one short of Nap Lajoie's franchise record and four short of his former teammate Benito Santiago's record for catchers), and helped lead Cleveland to their third straight postseason appearance. In the Division Series against the New York Yankees, Alomar hit .316 with two home runs, including a game-tying shot off Mariano Rivera in the eighth inning of Game 4. Though he was less effective against the Baltimore Orioles in the ALCS, he still provided a game-winning hit in the ninth inning of Game 4. The Indians lost the World Series to the Florida Marlins, but not on account of Alomar, who hit .367 with two home runs.

Although Alomar was selected to his sixth All-Star team in 1998, he turned in a mediocre season overall and then had injury problems again in 1999. Alomar was the unofficially recognized team leader of the Indians during their 1995–99 run when they won two pennants. He left the Indians as a free agent after the 2000 season and played in a limited role with the Chicago White Sox, Colorado Rockies, Texas Rangers, Los Angeles Dodgers, and New York Mets. On August 1, 2009, the Indians inducted Alomar to the organization's Hall of Fame.

== Coaching career ==
On February 15, 2008, Alomar was named the catching instructor for the New York Mets organization. He spent the 2008 and 2009 seasons in that role.

Alomar was hired in November 2009 as the first base coach on manager Manny Acta's staff of the Cleveland Indians.

During the 2010 offseason, Alomar was rumored to be one of four finalists, along with Brian Butterfield, DeMarlo Hale, and John Farrell, for the Toronto Blue Jays managerial job.

During the end of the 2011 season, Alomar was rumored to be on the shortlist of candidates for the vacant Chicago Cubs and Boston Red Sox managerial positions. On September 28, 2011, Alomar was promoted by the Indians to the position of bench coach for the 2012 season. On September 27, 2012, the Indians promoted him to interim manager after firing Acta. He finished his interim reign with a record of three wins and three losses. On October 6, 2012, the Indians announced that the club had hired Terry Francona to take over as manager.

On October 31, 2012, the Cleveland Indians announced that Alomar would be back as the bench coach for the 2013 season under Francona. Alomar was replaced by Brad Mills as the bench coach and became their first base coach.

On August 2, 2020, Francona left the team due to gastrointestinal trouble and Alomar served as acting manager until Francona returned on August 9. Francona left the team again on August 18 to have surgery and Alomar served as the acting manager for the remainder of the season. In 46 games with Alomar acting as manager, the Indians went 28–18 (.609). The Indians were swept by the New York Yankees in the Wild Card Series.

== Managerial record ==
As of September 23, 2020

Team	Year	Regular season					Postseason			
Team	Year	Games	Won	Lost	Win %	Finish	Won	Lost	Win %	Result
CLE	2012	6	3	3	.500	4th in AL Central	–	–	–	–
Total		6	3	3	.500		0	0	–	

== See also ==
- Cleveland Guardians award winners and league leaders
- List of Major League Baseball career games played as a catcher leaders
- List of Major League Baseball career putouts as a catcher leaders
- List of Major League Baseball players from Puerto Rico
- List of Puerto Ricans
- List of second-generation Major League Baseball players

Sporting positions
Preceded by Luis Rivera; Mike Sarbaugh	Cleveland Indians/Guardians first base coach 2010–2011; 2014–present	Succeeded by Tom Wiedenbauer; Incumbent
Preceded by Tim Tolman	Cleveland Indians bench coach 2012–2013	Succeeded by Brad Mills
