= 1997 Major League Baseball season =

1997 MLB season
- League: Major League Baseball
- Sport: Baseball
- Duration: April 1 – October 26, 1997
- Games: 162
- Teams: 28
- TV partner(s): Fox/FSN/FX; ESPN; NBC

Draft
- Top draft pick: Matt Anderson
- Picked by: Detroit Tigers

Regular Season
- Season MVP: AL: Ken Griffey Jr. (SEA); NL: Larry Walker (COL)

Postseason
- AL champions: Cleveland Indians
- AL runners-up: Baltimore Orioles
- NL champions: Florida Marlins
- NL runners-up: Atlanta Braves

World Series
- Champions: Florida Marlins
- Runners-up: Cleveland Indians
- World Series MVP: Liván Hernández (FLA)

MLB seasons
- ← 1996 1998 →

Locations of teams for the 1997 American League season
West Central East
Locations of teams for the 1997 National League seasons
West Central East

The 1997 Major League Baseball season was the inaugural season for Interleague play, as well as the final season in the American League for the Milwaukee Brewers before moving to the NL the following season. The California Angels changed their name to the Anaheim Angels. The Florida Marlins ended the season (their fifth season in the majors) as the World Champions defeating the Cleveland Indians in a seven-game World Series, four games to three.

== Standings ==
=== American League ===
AL East
Team	W	L	Pct.	GB	Home	Road
Baltimore Orioles	98	64	.605	—	46‍–‍35	52‍–‍29
New York Yankees	96	66	.593	2	47‍–‍33	49‍–‍33
Detroit Tigers	79	83	.488	19	42‍–‍39	37‍–‍44
Boston Red Sox	78	84	.481	20	39‍–‍42	39‍–‍42
Toronto Blue Jays	76	86	.469	22	42‍–‍39	34‍–‍47

AL Central
Team	W	L	Pct.	GB	Home	Road
Cleveland Indians	86	75	.534	—	44‍–‍37	42‍–‍38
Chicago White Sox	80	81	.497	6	45‍–‍36	35‍–‍45
Milwaukee Brewers	78	83	.484	8	47‍–‍33	31‍–‍50
Minnesota Twins	68	94	.420	18½	35‍–‍46	33‍–‍48
Kansas City Royals	67	94	.416	19	33‍–‍47	34‍–‍47

AL West
Team	W	L	Pct.	GB	Home	Road
Seattle Mariners	90	72	.556	—	45‍–‍36	45‍–‍36
Anaheim Angels	84	78	.519	6	46‍–‍36	38‍–‍42
Texas Rangers	77	85	.475	13	39‍–‍42	38‍–‍43
Oakland Athletics	65	97	.401	25	35‍–‍46	30‍–‍51

=== National League ===
NL East
Team	W	L	Pct.	GB	Home	Road
Atlanta Braves	101	61	.623	—	50‍–‍31	51‍–‍30
Florida Marlins	92	70	.568	9	52‍–‍29	40‍–‍41
New York Mets	88	74	.543	13	50‍–‍31	38‍–‍43
Montreal Expos	78	84	.481	23	45‍–‍36	33‍–‍48
Philadelphia Phillies	68	94	.420	33	38‍–‍43	30‍–‍51

NL Central
Team	W	L	Pct.	GB	Home	Road
Houston Astros	84	78	.519	—	46‍–‍35	38‍–‍43
Pittsburgh Pirates	79	83	.488	5	43‍–‍38	36‍–‍45
Cincinnati Reds	76	86	.469	8	40‍–‍41	36‍–‍45
St. Louis Cardinals	73	89	.451	11	41‍–‍40	32‍–‍49
Chicago Cubs	68	94	.420	16	42‍–‍39	26‍–‍55

NL West
Team	W	L	Pct.	GB	Home	Road
San Francisco Giants	90	72	.556	—	48‍–‍33	42‍–‍39
Los Angeles Dodgers	88	74	.543	2	47‍–‍34	41‍–‍40
Colorado Rockies	83	79	.512	7	47‍–‍34	36‍–‍45
San Diego Padres	76	86	.469	14	39‍–‍42	37‍–‍44

== Postseason ==
=== Bracket ===
Division Series (ALDS, NLDS)
Central	Cleveland	3
WC	NY Yankees	2
American League
East	Baltimore	3
West	Seattle	1
East	Atlanta	3
Central	Houston	0
National League
West	San Francisco	0
WC	Florida	3

League Championship Series (ALCS, NLCS)
Central	Cleveland	4
East	Baltimore	2
East	Atlanta	2
WC	Florida	4

World Series
AL	Cleveland	3
NL	Florida	4

== Awards and honors ==
- Baseball Hall of Fame
  - Nellie Fox
  - Tommy Lasorda
  - Phil Niekro
  - Willie Wells

Baseball Writers' Association of America Awards
BBWAA Award	National League	American League
Rookie of the Year	Scott Rolen (PHI)	Nomar Garciaparra (BOS)
Cy Young Award	Pedro Martínez (MON)	Roger Clemens (TOR)
Manager of the Year	Dusty Baker (SF)	Davey Johnson (BAL)
Most Valuable Player	Larry Walker (COL)	Ken Griffey Jr. (SEA)
Gold Glove Awards
Position	National League	American League
Pitcher	Greg Maddux (ATL)	Mike Mussina (BAL)
Catcher	Charles Johnson (FLA)	Iván Rodríguez (TEX)
First Baseman	J. T. Snow (SF)	Rafael Palmeiro (BAL)
Second Baseman	Craig Biggio (HOU)	Chuck Knoblauch (MIN)
Third Baseman	Ken Caminiti (SD)	Matt Williams (CLE)
Shortstop	Rey Ordóñez (NYM)	Omar Vizquel (CLE)
Outfielders	Barry Bonds (SF)	Jim Edmonds (ANA)
Outfielders	Raúl Mondesí (LAD)	Ken Griffey Jr. (SEA)
Outfielders	Larry Walker (COL)	Bernie Williams (NYY)
Silver Slugger Awards
Pitcher/Designated Hitter	John Smoltz (ATL)	Edgar Martínez (SEA)
Catcher	Mike Piazza (LAD)	Iván Rodríguez (TEX)
First Baseman	Jeff Bagwell (HOU)	Tino Martinez (NYY)
Second Baseman	Craig Biggio (HOU)	Chuck Knoblauch (MIN)
Third Baseman	Vinny Castilla (COL)	Matt Williams (CLE)
Shortstop	Jeff Blauser (ATL)	Nomar Garciaparra (BOS)
Outfielders	Barry Bonds (SF)	Juan González (TEX)
Outfielders	Tony Gwynn (SD)	Ken Griffey Jr. (SEA)
Outfielders	Larry Walker (COL)	David Justice (CLE)

=== Other awards ===
- Outstanding Designated Hitter Award: Edgar Martínez (SEA)
- Roberto Clemente Award (Humanitarian): Eric Davis (BAL).
- Rolaids Relief Man Award: Randy Myers (BAL, American); Jeff Shaw (CIN, National).

=== Player of the Month ===
Month	American League	National League
April	Ken Griffey Jr.	Larry Walker
May	Frank Thomas	Tony Gwynn
June	Jeff King	Mike Piazza
July	Tim Salmon	Barry Bonds
August	Bernie Williams	Mike Piazza
September	Juan González	Mark McGwire

=== Pitcher of the Month ===
Month	American League	National League
April	Andy Pettitte	Tom Glavine
May	Roger Clemens	Bobby Jones
June	Randy Johnson	Kent Mercker
July	Chuck Finley; Brad Radke	Darryl Kile
August	Roger Clemens	Pedro Martínez
September	Jeff Fassero	Jeff Shaw

== MLB statistical leaders ==
Statistic	American League		National League	
AVG	Frank Thomas CWS	.347	Tony Gwynn SD	.372
HR	Ken Griffey Jr. SEA	56	Larry Walker COL	49
RBI	Ken Griffey Jr. SEA	147	Andrés Galarraga COL	140
Wins	Roger Clemens^{1} TOR	21	Denny Neagle ATL	20
ERA	Roger Clemens^{1} TOR	2.05	Pedro Martínez MON	1.90
SO	Roger Clemens^{1} TOR	292	Curt Schilling PHI	319
SV	Randy Myers BAL	45	Jeff Shaw CIN	42
SB	Brian Hunter DET	74	Tony Womack PIT	60

^{1} American League Triple Crown Pitching Winner

== Managers ==
=== American League ===
Team	Manager	Notes
Anaheim Angels	Terry Collins	
Baltimore Orioles	Davey Johnson	
Boston Red Sox	Jimy Williams	
Chicago White Sox	Terry Bevington	
Cleveland Indians	Mike Hargrove	Won American League Pennant
Detroit Tigers	Buddy Bell	
Kansas City Royals	Bob Boone, Tony Muser	
Milwaukee Brewers	Phil Garner	
Minnesota Twins	Tom Kelly	
New York Yankees	Joe Torre	
Oakland Athletics	Art Howe	
Seattle Mariners	Lou Piniella	
Texas Rangers	Johnny Oates	
Toronto Blue Jays	Cito Gaston, Mel Queen	

=== National League ===
Team	Manager	Notes
Atlanta Braves	Bobby Cox	
Chicago Cubs	Jim Riggleman	
Cincinnati Reds	Ray Knight, Jack McKeon	
Colorado Rockies	Don Baylor	
Florida Marlins	Jim Leyland	Won World Series
Houston Astros	Larry Dierker	
Los Angeles Dodgers	Bill Russell	
Montreal Expos	Felipe Alou	
New York Mets	Bobby Valentine	
Philadelphia Phillies	Terry Francona	
Pittsburgh Pirates	Gene Lamont	
St. Louis Cardinals	Tony La Russa	
San Diego Padres	Bruce Bochy	
San Francisco Giants	Dusty Baker	

== Home field attendance and payroll ==
Team name	Wins	%±	Home attendance	%±	Per game	Est. payroll	%±
Colorado Rockies	83	0.0%	3,888,453	−0.1%	48,006	$43,559,667	8.0%
Baltimore Orioles	98	11.4%	3,711,132	1.8%	45,816	$58,516,400	7.2%
Atlanta Braves	101	5.2%	3,464,488	19.4%	42,771	$52,278,500	5.2%
Cleveland Indians	86	−13.1%	3,404,750	2.6%	42,034	$56,802,460	17.8%
Los Angeles Dodgers	88	−2.2%	3,319,504	4.1%	40,982	$45,380,304	28.4%
Seattle Mariners	90	5.9%	3,192,237	17.2%	39,410	$41,540,661	0.5%
Texas Rangers	77	−14.4%	2,945,228	1.9%	36,361	$53,448,838	36.9%
St. Louis Cardinals	73	−17.0%	2,634,014	−0.8%	32,519	$45,456,667	12.9%
Toronto Blue Jays	76	2.7%	2,589,297	1.2%	31,967	$47,079,833	54.1%
New York Yankees	96	4.3%	2,580,325	14.6%	32,254	$62,241,545	14.9%
Florida Marlins	92	15.0%	2,364,387	35.4%	29,190	$48,692,500	56.4%
Boston Red Sox	78	−8.2%	2,226,136	−3.8%	27,483	$43,558,750	2.7%
Chicago Cubs	68	−10.5%	2,190,308	−1.3%	27,041	$42,155,333	27.4%
San Diego Padres	76	−16.5%	2,089,333	−4.5%	25,794	$37,363,672	31.8%
Houston Astros	84	2.4%	2,046,781	3.6%	25,269	$34,777,500	22.1%
Chicago White Sox	80	−5.9%	1,864,782	11.2%	23,022	$57,740,000	27.5%
Cincinnati Reds	76	−6.2%	1,785,788	−4.1%	22,047	$49,768,000	17.0%
Anaheim Angels	84	20.0%	1,767,330	−2.9%	21,553	$31,135,472	7.9%
New York Mets	88	23.9%	1,766,174	11.2%	21,805	$39,800,400	62.6%
San Francisco Giants	90	32.4%	1,690,869	19.6%	20,875	$35,592,378	−4.2%
Pittsburgh Pirates	79	8.2%	1,657,022	24.4%	20,457	$10,771,667	−53.2%
Kansas City Royals	67	−10.7%	1,517,638	5.7%	18,970	$34,810,000	71.6%
Montreal Expos	78	−11.4%	1,497,609	−7.4%	18,489	$19,295,500	18.6%
Philadelphia Phillies	68	1.5%	1,490,638	−17.3%	18,403	$36,656,500	6.8%
Milwaukee Brewers	78	−2.5%	1,444,027	8.8%	18,050	$23,655,338	8.9%
Minnesota Twins	68	−12.8%	1,411,064	−1.8%	17,421	$34,072,500	47.4%
Detroit Tigers	79	49.1%	1,365,157	16.8%	16,854	$17,272,000	−26.3%
Oakland Athletics	65	−16.7%	1,264,218	10.1%	15,608	$24,018,500	13.1%

== Television coverage ==
This was the second season under the five-year rights agreements with ESPN, Fox and NBC. ESPN continued to air Sunday Night Baseball and Wednesday Night Baseball. In addition to Fox Saturday Baseball broadcasts, Fox's coverage extended to Thursday night games on sister network Fox Sports Net and selected Monday and Tuesday primetime games on sister network FX. Fox also aired the All-Star Game. During the postseason, ESPN, Fox and NBC split the four Division Series. Fox then televised the American League Championship Series while NBC aired both the National League Championship Series and the World Series.

== Events ==
=== January–March ===
- January 5 – Boston Red Sox pitcher Tim Wakefield escapes serious injury when he is hit by a car while out jogging. He is released from the hospital after being treated for bruises.
- January 6 – Knuckleballer Phil Niekro is elected to the Hall of Fame by the Baseball Writers' Association of America. Niekro receives 80.34% of the vote. Pitcher Don Sutton falls nine votes short of election.
- February 20 – The Philadelphia Phillies sign free agent outfielder Danny Tartabull. Tartabull broke his foot on Opening Day and sat out the year before retiring.
- March 5 – Nellie Fox, Tommy Lasorda and Negro leaguer Willie Wells are elected to the Hall of Fame by the Veterans Committee.

=== April–May ===
- April 15 – In an unprecedented move, Commissioner of Baseball Bud Selig announces on the 50th Anniversary of Jackie Robinson's debut that the number he wore with the Brooklyn Dodgers, number 42, would be unilaterally retired throughout all of Major League Baseball during a mid-game ceremony in a game between the Dodgers and the New York Mets at Shea Stadium. Jackie's widow Rachel Robinson and President Bill Clinton attended the event as well. The number would be worn by players during the anniversary of his major league debut, and would still be worn by players who started wearing the number before the announcement, most famously the New York Yankees' Mariano Rivera, until he retired after the 2013 season, thus officially retiring number 42, as he was the last player to wear the number 42 jersey on a regular basis.
- April 29 – Chili Davis' 300th home run, leading off the 10th inning, snaps a 5–5 tie and gives the Kansas City Royals a 6–5 win over the Toronto Blue Jays.
- May 7 – The Montreal Expos score a National League-record 13 runs in the 6th inning of their game against the San Francisco Giants on the way to a 19–3 win, tying a modern (1900–present) major league record set in 1923 for most runs scored in the sixth inning. The Expos send 17 batters to the plate. Mike Lansing homers twice in the inning to drive in five runs, becoming the third Expos player to perform the feat, and the first NL second baseman to do so since Bobby Lowe in 1894.
- May 8 – At home, the Baltimore Orioles stop Randy Johnson's 16-game win streak with a decisive 13–3 pasting of the Seattle Mariners. Baltimore is led by catcher Chris Hoiles, who collects six RBI on two homers and a double. Johnson strikes out 10 in six innings, but gives up five runs on six hits and two walks in his attempt to become the first AL pitcher since Dave McNally (1968–69) to win 17 straight.
- May 13 – Eddie Murray gets two hits in Anaheim's 8–7 win over the Chicago White Sox. The game is the 3,000th of Murray's career, making him only the sixth player in history to reach that mark, joining Pete Rose, Carl Yastrzemski, Hank Aaron, Ty Cobb and Stan Musial.
- May 21 – Roger Clemens fires the Toronto Blue Jays past the New York Yankees 4–1, for his 8th win of the year against no losses. The Rocket wins his 200th game, the 94th pitcher to reach the 200 victories mark.
- May 25 – The Minnesota Twins retire Kirby Puckett's uniform number 34 in a 90-minute pregame ceremony.
- May 26 – In the Chicago Cubs' 2–1 win over the Pittsburgh Pirates, Cub Sammy Sosa and Pirate Tony Womack both hit inside-the-park home runs in the sixth inning. It is the first time two inside-the-park homers are hit in the same NL game since Lou Brock and Héctor Cruz of the St. Louis Cardinals did it against the San Diego Padres on June 18, 1976. Greg Gagne of the Twins had two for Minnesota on October 4, 1986.
- May 26 – In Toronto, Roger Clemens allows one run and four hits in seven innings and strikes out seven to beat the Rangers 8–1. The Rocket is now 9–0, his best start since beginning 1986 at 14–0.
- May 26 – Andrés Galarraga hits a 469-foot two-run homer and Vinny Castilla adds a solo shot as the Colorado Rockies overcome a six-run deficit to beat the Cardinals 9–7. Galarraga has four RBI, and his moon shot off Mark Petkovsek is the third-longest homer in the three-season history of Coors Field.
- May 27 – Barry Larkin's streak of consecutively reaching base 13 times is stopped by Curt Schilling, who goes all the way to beat Cincinnati 2–1. Larkin singles in the first inning, but flies out in the 3rd to end his streak one shy of Pedro Guerrero's NL record, set in 1985.
- May 30 – The Orioles' Mike Mussina retires the first 25 Indian batters before Sandy Alomar Jr. ruins his no-hit bid with a one-out single in the 9th. Mussina then strikes out the final two batters for a 3–0 victory.
- May 31 – Cal Ripken Jr. snaps a 7th-inning tie with a record-breaking home run as the Baltimore Orioles rally from a 4-run deficit to beat the Cleveland Indians 8–5. Ripken's homer gives him 4,274 total bases with Baltimore, breaking the franchise mark for total bases in a career. Baltimore also place Eric Davis on the disabled list. Davis is suffering from colon cancer and will be operated on in early June.
- May 31 – In Miami, Andrés Galarraga golfs a 529-foot grand slam, the longest home run ever at Pro Player Stadium. His homer gives the Colorado Rockies a 7–0 lead over the Florida Marlins, and they eventually win 8–4. Galarraga has three home runs in the past three games against Florida that traveled 1,435 feet, an average of 478 feet. He hit a 455-foot homer two days before and a 451-foot homer the previous day. The longest previous homer at the stadium was 482 feet by Pete Incaviglia of the Phillies off Al Leiter on May 1, 1996.
- May 31 – Unbeaten Roger Clemens is the first 10-game winner in the majors, as the Toronto Blue Jays romp 13–3 over the Oakland Athletics.
- May 31 – Ila Borders of the St. Paul Saints of the Northern League faces three Sioux Falls Canaries batters, and surrenders three earned runs, in her professional baseball debut. The Canaries, who led 4–0 when she entered the game, go on to defeat St. Paul 11–1.

=== June–July ===
- June 12 – The first interleague game took place as the Texas Rangers hosted the San Francisco Giants at The Ballpark in Arlington (now Choctaw Stadium).
- July 8 – The American League defeats the National League by a score of 3–1 in the annual All-Star Game, played at Jacobs Field. Cleveland Indians catcher Sandy Alomar Jr. hits a 2-run home run and is named the game's MVP. Alomar is the first hometown player to homer since Hank Aaron did it in Atlanta–Fulton County Stadium in 1972.
- July 12 – At a sold out Three Rivers Stadium, Francisco Córdova pitched nine innings of a combined 10-inning no-hitter for the Pittsburgh Pirates. Ricardo Rincón pitched the 10th inning. The Pirates won the game on a dramatic three run, pinch hit home run in the bottom of the 10th by Mark Smith.

=== August–September ===
- August 31 – Don Mattingly, the former first baseman and Yankee captain has his uniform number 23 retired by the New York Yankees in a pregame ceremony. A plaque is also dedicated in his honor in Monument Park.
- September 4 – Rookie catcher Bobby Estalella has three home runs and four RBI as he leads the Philadelphia Phillies to a 6–4 win over the Montreal Expos.
- September 10 – Mark McGwire joins Babe Ruth as the only players in major league history with 50 home runs in consecutive seasons by hitting a 446-foot shot off Shawn Estes in the third inning of the St. Louis Cardinals' road game against the San Francisco Giants. McGwire, who hit a major league-leading 52 homers for the Oakland Athletics last season, becomes the first player with back-to-back 50-homer seasons since Ruth did it in 1927 and 1928.
- September 28 – Tony Gwynn of the San Diego Padres ties Honus Wagner's record by winning his eighth National League batting title. Gwynn finishes at .372, becoming the first player to win four consecutive NL batting titles since Rogers Hornsby won six straight between 1920 and 1925.

=== October–December ===
- October 26 – The Florida Marlins beat the Cleveland Indians in Game 7 to become the first Wild Card team to win the World Series.
- October 27 – The Detroit Tigers break ground on their new ballpark.
- November 4 - Voters in 11 counties in southwestern Pennsylvania reject the Regional Renaissance Initiative, a voter referendum to raise sales taxes to fund new stadiums for the Pittsburgh Pirates and Pittsburgh Steelers. The public funding necessary to ensure their construction would eventually be approved legislatively in an alternate proposal colloquially known as "Plan B".
- November 6 – The Milwaukee Brewers switch leagues, joining the National League Central Division, after the Kansas City Royals reject the invitation. With the 1998 addition of the Arizona Diamondbacks (NL) and Tampa Bay Devil Rays (AL), the move will maintain an even number of teams in each league.
- November 18 — The expansion draft starts with several transactions. Two pitchers who appeared in the World Series a month earlier, Tony Saunders (Florida Marlins) and Brian Anderson (Cleveland Indians), are the first players taken. Saunders, the first player chosen overall, heads a list of new Tampa Bay Devil Rays team that includes Quinton McCracken, Bubba Trammell, Albie López and Terrell Wade. Tampa Bay also obtain John Flaherty from the San Diego Padres in exchange for Brian Boehringer and Andy Sheets; Kevin Stocker from the Philadelphia Phillies for Bobby Abreu; Fred McGriff from the Atlanta Braves in exchange for a player to be named, and sign free agent Roberto Hernández. The Arizona Diamondbacks, meanwhile, who signed free agent Jay Bell to a five-year contract yesterday, select Jeff Suppan, Jorge Fábregas and Karim García, and acquire Travis Fryman from the Detroit Tigers in exchange for Joe Randa, Gabe Alvarez and a minor leaguer. They also obtain Devon White from the Florida Marlins for a prospect.

== Deaths ==
- January 6 – Dick Donovan, 69, All-Star pitcher, mainly with the White Sox and Indians, who led AL in ERA in 1961 and won 20 games in 1962
- January 20 – Curt Flood, 59, All-Star center fielder who won seven Gold Gloves and batted .300 six times; challenged baseball's reserve clause all the way to the U.S. Supreme Court, unsuccessfully, after refusing a trade
- February 7 – Manny Salvo, 83, Boston pitcher who tied for the National League lead in shutouts in 1940
- February 13 – Bobby Adams, 75, third baseman for the Cincinnati Reds/Redlegs, Chicago White Sox, Baltimore Orioles and Chicago Cubs between 1946 and 1959
- June 1 – Mickey Rocco, 81, Cleveland first baseman who led the American League in fielding percentage at his position in 1943 and 1945
- June 9 – Thornton Lee, 90, All-Star pitcher who won over 100 games for the White Sox; won 22 games and led AL in ERA in 1941
- July 31 – Eddie Miller, 80, 7-time All-Star shortstop for four NL teams who led league in fielding five times
- August 23 – Guy Curtright, 84, White Sox outfielder who finished sixth in 1943 American League batting race with a .291 average
- September 9 – Richie Ashburn, 70, Hall of Fame center fielder for the Phillies who batted .308 lifetime, winning two batting titles, and led NL in putouts nine times, hits three times, triples twice and steals once; retired with six of the top eight single-season putout totals in history
- September 22 – Eddie Sawyer, 87, manager who led the Phillies' "Whiz Kids" to the 1950 pennant, later a scout
- September 26 – Woody English, 91, All-Star infielder for the Cubs who batted .300 twice
- October 6 – Johnny Vander Meer, 82, All-Star pitcher for the Cincinnati Reds who in 1938 became the only player to pitch two consecutive no-hitters; led NL in strikeouts three times
- October 21 – Dolph Camilli, 90, All-Star first baseman who was the NL's MVP in 1941, leading the Brooklyn Dodgers to the pennant; had five 100-RBI seasons
- November 2 – Roy McMillan, 68, All-Star shortstop for the Reds, Braves and Mets who won the NL's first three Gold Gloves; minor league manager, coach and scout
- November 20 – Dick Littlefield, 71, well-traveled pitcher who played for nine teams, earning 15 of his 33 wins with the Pirates
- November 27 – Buck Leonard, 90, Hall of Fame first baseman of the Negro leagues regularly among the league leaders in batting average and home runs
