= Baseball at the 2006 Central American and Caribbean Games =

- Venue: Estadio Once de Noviembre
- Location: Cartagena, Colombia
- Dates: 16–24 July 2006

Medalists
gold medal	Cuba
silver medal	Dominican Republic
bronze medal	Mexico; Venezuela

Baseball was contested at the 2006 Central American and Caribbean Games in Cartagena, Colombia. The tournament was played at the Estadio Once de Noviembre.

Cuba won the gold medal in a 7–1 final victory against Dominican Republic. The bronze medal game was suspended due to heavy rain; therefore, the losing semifinalists, Mexico and Venezuela, were awarded bronze.

== Medalists ==
Event	Gold	Silver	Bronze
Men's baseball	Cuba; Giorvis Duvergel; Eduardo Paret; Yulieski Gourriel; Rudy Reyes; Michel Enríquez; Ariel Pestano; Adiel Palma; Alexei Ramírez; Vicyohandri Odelín; Frederich Cepeda; Frank Montieth; Yoandy Garlobo; Osmani Urrutia; Yulieski González; Eriel Sánchez; Yadier Pedroso; Alexander Mayeta; Yadel Martí; Yunesky Maya; Pedro Lazo	Dominican Republic; Mártires Castro; Henry Alvarez; Noel Amaro; Gilberto Calderon; Rafael Carrasco; Rafael Cruz; Hilario de la Cruz; Luis de Paula; Victor Espinosa; Miguel García; Fausto Guzman; Willy Lebron; Wilfredo Lorenzo; Rafael Martínez; Carlos Olivo; José Pérez; Christian Reyes; Eladio Rodríguez; Alexander Santa; Julio Toribio	Mexico; Víctor Álvarez; Adán Amezcua; Víctor Bojórquez; Francisco Campos; Hugo Castellanos; Miguel Flores; Luis García; Gerónimo Gil; Jesús Guzmán; Raúl López; Abel Martínez; Pablo Ortega; Edgar Quintero; Roberto Ramírez; Javier Robles; José Luis Sandoval; Walter Silva; Joakim Soria; Mario Valdez; Jorge Vázquez
Men's baseball	Cuba; Giorvis Duvergel; Eduardo Paret; Yulieski Gourriel; Rudy Reyes; Michel Enríquez; Ariel Pestano; Adiel Palma; Alexei Ramírez; Vicyohandri Odelín; Frederich Cepeda; Frank Montieth; Yoandy Garlobo; Osmani Urrutia; Yulieski González; Eriel Sánchez; Yadier Pedroso; Alexander Mayeta; Yadel Martí; Yunesky Maya; Pedro Lazo	Dominican Republic; Mártires Castro; Henry Alvarez; Noel Amaro; Gilberto Calderon; Rafael Carrasco; Rafael Cruz; Hilario de la Cruz; Luis de Paula; Victor Espinosa; Miguel García; Fausto Guzman; Willy Lebron; Wilfredo Lorenzo; Rafael Martínez; Carlos Olivo; José Pérez; Christian Reyes; Eladio Rodríguez; Alexander Santa; Julio Toribio	Venezuela; José Aponte; René Bastardo; Ramón Castro; Dirimo Chavez; Luis Córdova; Luis Córdova; Yulien García; Willy Guedez; Argenis Landaeta; José León; Jorge Lugo; Rene Pinto; Manuel Ramírez; René Reyes; Julio Salazar; Luis Salazar; Michael Sandoval; Jorge Teran; Wuillians Vasquez; Arvin Vegas

== First round ==
=== Group A ===
Pos	Team	Pld	W	L	RF	RA	RD	PCT	GB	Qualification
1	Dominican Republic	3	3	0	21	8	+13	1.000	—	Advance to Knockout stage
2	Mexico	4	3	1	26	9	+17	.750	0.5	Advance to Knockout stage
3	Colombia (H)	3	2	1	13	5	+8	.667	1	Advance to Knockout stage
4	Panama	4	1	3	17	12	+5	.250	2.5	Advance to Knockout stage
5	Bahamas	4	0	4	2	45	−43	.000	3.5	

Source: XX Central American and Caribbean Games
(H) Hosts

16 July 2006	Dominican Republic	5–3	Mexico	Estadio Once de Noviembre, Cartagena

16 July 2006	Colombia	9–0	Bahamas	Estadio Once de Noviembre, Cartagena

17 July 2006	Dominican Republic	5–4	Panama	Estadio Once de Noviembre, Cartagena

17 July 2006	Mexico	4–2	Colombia	Estadio Once de Noviembre, Cartagena

18 July 2006	Mexico	15–0	Bahamas	Estadio Once de Noviembre, Cartagena

18 July 2006	Colombia	2–1	Panama	Estadio Once de Noviembre, Cartagena

19 July 2006	Dominican Republic	11–1	Bahamas	Estadio Once de Noviembre, Cartagena

19 July 2006	Mexico	4–2	Panama	Estadio Once de Noviembre, Cartagena

20 July 2006	Panama	10–1	Bahamas	Estadio Once de Noviembre, Cartagena

20 July 2006	Colombia	Rainout	Dominican Republic	Estadio Once de Noviembre, Cartagena

=== Group B ===
Pos	Team	Pld	W	L	RF	RA	RD	PCT	GB	Qualification
1	Cuba	4	4	0	30	7	+23	1.000	—	Advance to Knockout stage
2	Venezuela	4	3	1	17	17	0	.750	1	Advance to Knockout stage
3	Nicaragua	4	2	2	19	12	+7	.500	2	Advance to Knockout stage
4	Puerto Rico	4	1	3	12	18	−6	.250	3	Advance to Knockout stage
5	Guatemala	4	0	4	4	28	−24	.000	4	

Source: XX Central American and Caribbean Games

16 July 2006	Cuba	7–1	Guatemala	Estadio Once de Noviembre, Cartagena

16 July 2006	Venezuela	3–2	Nicaragua	Estadio Once de Noviembre, Cartagena

17 July 2006	Venezuela	6–3	Puerto Rico	Estadio Once de Noviembre, Cartagena

17 July 2006	Cuba	6–1	Nicaragua	Estadio Once de Noviembre, Cartagena

18 July 2006	Cuba	11–2	Venezuela	Estadio Once de Noviembre, Cartagena

18 July 2006	Puerto Rico	3–2	Guatemala	Estadio Once de Noviembre, Cartagena

19 July 2006	Nicaragua	4–3	Puerto Rico	Estadio Once de Noviembre, Cartagena

19 July 2006	Venezuela	6–1	Guatemala	Estadio Once de Noviembre, Cartagena

20 July 2006	Nicaragua	12–0	Guatemala	Estadio Once de Noviembre, Cartagena

20 July 2006	Cuba	6–3	Puerto Rico	Estadio Once de Noviembre, Cartagena

== Knockout stage ==
Quarterfinals
Dominican Republic	2
Puerto Rico	1
Venezuela	4
Colombia	3
Cuba	4
Panama	2
Mexico	8
Nicaragua	4

Semifinals
Dominican Republic	4
Venezuela	3
Cuba	7
Mexico	5

Gold Medal Match
Dominican Republic	1
Cuba	7
