= Manuel Ramirez =

Manuel Ramirez may refer to:

- Manuel Ramírez (athlete) (born 1957), Colombian Olympic sprinter
- Manuel Ramírez Fernández de Córdoba (1948–2007), Spanish journalist
- Manuel Ramírez Gómez, Colombian economist
- Manuel Ramírez (guitar maker) (1864–1916), Spanish luthier
- Manuel Ramírez Ibáñez (1856–1925), Spanish painter
- Manuel Ramírez (footballer), Chilean footballer who played in the South American Championship 1926
- Manuel Ramírez (baseball) (born 1982), Venezuelan baseball player
- Manny Ramirez (born 1972), Major League Baseball player
- Manny Ramirez (American football) (born 1983), American football player
- Manuel Ramirez, character in Seize the Night (novel)
