= 1970 Amateur World Series =

Tournament details
- Country: Colombia
- Teams: 11
- Defending champions: Cuba

Final positions
- Champions: Cuba
- Runners-up: United States
- Third place: Puerto Rico
- Fourth place: Colombia

Awards
- MVP: (Colombia) Abel Leal

The 1970 Amateur World Series was held in Cartagena, Colombia from November 18 through December 4, 1970. It was the first Amateur World Series in over 30 years to feature a European team and was the first to include two European teams, in the form of Italy and the Netherlands. It also marked the debut of Canada in Amateur World Series play.

The tournament was won by Cuba, for their second consecutive title and their fifth in the past eight editions. The United States finished in second, also for the second consecutive year.

== Participants ==
The Italian and Dutch national teams were both fixtures of the European Baseball Championship, but neither had ever appeared in an Amateur World Series tournament until 1970. They would be the first European teams in the tournament since Great Britain defeated the United States in the inaugural Amateur World Series in 1938. While Italy and the Netherlands both won a game, the newcomers clearly struggled; nevertheless, within 35 years, both would make it to the medal round of the tournament.

This was the second year of competition for the United States national baseball team, which returned to the AWS after a near-three decade absence. Jack Stallings, head coach of Florida State University, managed the team.

== Results ==
=== Group stage ===
Pos	Team	Pld	W	L	RF	RA	RD	PCT	GB
1	United States	11	10	1	76	17	+59	.909	—
2	Cuba	11	10	1	87	7	+80	.909	—
3	Puerto Rico	11	9	2	68	36	+32	.818	1
4	Colombia	11	8	3	76	29	+47	.727	2
5	Venezuela	11	7	4	52	40	+12	.636	3
6	Dominican Republic	11	6	5	52	44	+8	.545	4
7	Guatemala	11	5	6	34	68	−34	.455	5
8	Nicaragua	11	4	7	49	51	−2	.364	6
9	Netherlands Antilles	11	3	8	27	79	−52	.273	7
10	Italy	10	1	9	17	66	−49	.100	8.5
11	Canada	10	1	9	15	65	−50	.100	8.5
12	Netherlands	11	1	10	28	79	−51	.091	9

November 18, 1970	Venezuela	5–1	Netherlands	Estadio Once de Noviembre, Cartagena
November 18, 1970	WP: A. Córdova		LP: R. Renooij	Estadio Once de Noviembre, Cartagena

November 19, 1970	Guatemala	1–0	Italy	Estadio Once de Noviembre, Cartagena
November 19, 1970	WP: J. Acosta		LP: C. Glorioso	Estadio Once de Noviembre, Cartagena

November 19, 1970	Puerto Rico	9–7	Dominican Republic	Estadio Once de Noviembre, Cartagena
November 19, 1970	WP: L. Torres		LP: W. Tejeda	Estadio Once de Noviembre, Cartagena

November 19, 1970	Colombia	9–0	Netherlands Antilles	Estadio Once de Noviembre, Cartagena
November 19, 1970	WP: R. Morelos		LP: L. Reyes	Estadio Once de Noviembre, Cartagena

November 19, 1970	United States	11–1	Nicaragua	Estadio Tomás Arrieta, Barranquilla
November 19, 1970	WP: Rich Troedson		LP: J. Juárez	Estadio Tomás Arrieta, Barranquilla

November 20, 1970	Guatemala	6–2	Venezuela	Estadio Once de Noviembre, Cartagena
November 20, 1970	WP: R. Iriarte		LP: L. M. Hdez.	Estadio Once de Noviembre, Cartagena

November 20, 1970	Nicaragua	5–2	Netherlands	Estadio Once de Noviembre, Cartagena
November 20, 1970	WP: J. Juárez		LP: J. Westrenen	Estadio Once de Noviembre, Cartagena

November 20, 1970	Cuba	12–0	Canada	Estadio Once de Noviembre, Cartagena
November 20, 1970	WP: Gaspar Legón		LP: M. Gage Cole	Estadio Once de Noviembre, Cartagena

November 20, 1970	Puerto Rico	4–0	Italy	Estadio Tomás Arrieta, Barranquilla
November 20, 1970	WP: N. Cruz		LP: G. Lercker	Estadio Tomás Arrieta, Barranquilla

November 20, 1970	United States	14–0	Netherlands Antilles	Estadio Tomás Arrieta, Barranquilla
November 20, 1970	WP: Burt Hooton		LP: H. Marcelina	Estadio Tomás Arrieta, Barranquilla

November 20, 1970	Colombia	3–1	Dominican Republic	Estadio Tomás Arrieta, Barranquilla
November 20, 1970	WP: A. Jaramillo		LP: D. Guzmán	Estadio Tomás Arrieta, Barranquilla

November 20, 1970	Guatemala	9–5	Netherlands Antilles	Estadio Once de Noviembre, Cartagena
November 20, 1970	WP: R. Iriarte		LP: R. Moesker	Estadio Once de Noviembre, Cartagena

November 21, 1970	Venezuela	5–1	Dominican Republic	Estadio Once de Noviembre, Cartagena
November 21, 1970	WP: E. Benítez		LP: R. Arias	Estadio Once de Noviembre, Cartagena

November 21, 1970	Colombia	14–0	Netherlands	Estadio Once de Noviembre, Cartagena
November 21, 1970	WP: N. García		LP: N. Beenders	Estadio Once de Noviembre, Cartagena

November 21, 1970	United States	3–2	Italy	Estadio Tomás Arrieta, Barranquilla
November 21, 1970	WP: Jim Burton		LP: G. Bertoni	Estadio Tomás Arrieta, Barranquilla

November 21, 1970	Nicaragua	13–0	Canada	Estadio Tomás Arrieta, Barranquilla
November 21, 1970	WP: S. Lacayo		LP: B. Mabee	Estadio Tomás Arrieta, Barranquilla

November 21, 1970	Cuba	10–0	Puerto Rico	Estadio Tomás Arrieta, Barranquilla
November 21, 1970	WP: M. Hurtado		LP: S. Quiñones	Estadio Tomás Arrieta, Barranquilla

November 22, 1970	Netherlands Antilles	4–2	Italy	Estadio Tomás Arrieta, Barranquilla
November 22, 1970	WP: L. Reyes		LP: F. Carradini	Estadio Tomás Arrieta, Barranquilla

November 22, 1970	Dominican Republic	2–1	Nicaragua	Estadio Tomás Arrieta, Barranquilla
November 22, 1970	WP: G. Rodríguez		LP: J. Juárez	Estadio Tomás Arrieta, Barranquilla

November 22, 1970	Colombia	7–6	Puerto Rico	Estadio Tomás Arrieta, Barranquilla
November 22, 1970	WP: A. Jaramillo		LP: J. Quiñones	Estadio Tomás Arrieta, Barranquilla

November 23, 1970	Netherlands Antilles	3–1	Canada	Estadio Once de Noviembre, Cartagena
November 23, 1970	WP: J. Stroop		LP: L. Lisowsky	Estadio Once de Noviembre, Cartagena

November 23, 1970	Cuba	11–1	Dominican Republic	Estadio Once de Noviembre, Cartagena
November 23, 1970	WP: Santiago Mederos		LP: R. Ramos	Estadio Once de Noviembre, Cartagena

November 23, 1970	Guatemala	5–4	Netherlands	Estadio Once de Noviembre, Cartagena
November 23, 1970	WP: C. Guzmán		LP: C. de Vries	Estadio Once de Noviembre, Cartagena

November 23, 1970	United States	7–1	Venezuela	Estadio Tomás Arrieta, Barranquilla
November 23, 1970	WP: Rich Troedson		LP: A. Rojas	Estadio Tomás Arrieta, Barranquilla

November 23, 1970	Colombia	16–2	Italy	Estadio Tomás Arrieta, Barranquilla
November 23, 1970	WP: O. García		LP: G. Silva	Estadio Tomás Arrieta, Barranquilla

November 24, 1970	Nicaragua	9–0	Guatemala	Estadio Once de Noviembre, Cartagena
November 24, 1970	WP: A. Taylor		LP: O. García	Estadio Once de Noviembre, Cartagena

November 24, 1970	Dominican Republic	6–2	Netherlands Antilles	Estadio Once de Noviembre, Cartagena
November 24, 1970	WP: D. Guzmán		LP: R. Moesker	Estadio Once de Noviembre, Cartagena

November 24, 1970	United States	4–3	Canada	Estadio Once de Noviembre, Cartagena
November 24, 1970	WP: Mike Caldwell		LP: M. Gage Cole	Estadio Once de Noviembre, Cartagena

November 24, 1970	Puerto Rico	3–2	Netherlands	Estadio Tomás Arrieta, Barranquilla
November 24, 1970	WP: J. Guilbe		LP: R. Renooij	Estadio Tomás Arrieta, Barranquilla

November 24, 1970	Cuba	9–1	Italy	Estadio Tomás Arrieta, Barranquilla
November 24, 1970	WP: O. Romero		LP: G. Lercker	Estadio Tomás Arrieta, Barranquilla

November 24, 1970	Venezuela	4–2	Colombia	Estadio Tomás Arrieta, Barranquilla
November 24, 1970	WP: A. Córdova		LP: A. Jaramillo	Estadio Tomás Arrieta, Barranquilla

November 25, 1970	Cuba	10–1	Netherlands	Estadio Once de Noviembre, Cartagena
November 25, 1970	WP: E. Salgado		LP: N. Beender	Estadio Once de Noviembre, Cartagena

November 25, 1970	Nicaragua	6–2	Italy	Estadio Once de Noviembre, Cartagena
November 25, 1970	WP: S. Lacayo		LP: G. Bertoni	Estadio Once de Noviembre, Cartagena

November 25, 1970	Colombia	10–4	Canada	Estadio Once de Noviembre, Cartagena
November 25, 1970	WP: O. García		LP: G. Scott	Estadio Once de Noviembre, Cartagena

November 25, 1970	Dominican Republic	3–0	Guatemala	Estadio Tomás Arrieta, Barranquilla
November 25, 1970	WP: G. Rodríguez		LP: R. Iriarte	Estadio Tomás Arrieta, Barranquilla

November 25, 1970	Venezuela	7–2	Netherlands Antilles	Estadio Tomás Arrieta, Barranquilla
November 25, 1970	WP: D. Bravo		LP: S. Gosepa	Estadio Tomás Arrieta, Barranquilla

November 25, 1970	Puerto Rico	3–2	United States	Estadio Tomás Arrieta, Barranquilla
November 25, 1970	WP: J. González		LP: Jim Burton	Estadio Tomás Arrieta, Barranquilla

November 26, 1970	Guatemala	10–1	Canada	Estadio Once de Noviembre, Cartagena
November 26, 1970	WP: J. Acosta		LP: L. Lisowsky	Estadio Once de Noviembre, Cartagena

November 26, 1970	United States	9–1	Netherlands	Estadio Once de Noviembre, Cartagena
November 26, 1970	WP: Mike Caldwell		LP: R. Dom	Estadio Once de Noviembre, Cartagena

November 26, 1970	Cuba	8–1	Venezuela	Estadio Once de Noviembre, Cartagena
November 26, 1970	WP: G. Legón		LP: E. Benítez	Estadio Once de Noviembre, Cartagena

November 27, 1970	Cuba	7–0	Netherlands Antilles	Estadio Tomás Arrieta, Barranquilla
November 27, 1970	WP: O. Romero		LP: H. Marcelina	Estadio Tomás Arrieta, Barranquilla

November 27, 1970	United States	13–1	Guatemala	Estadio Tomás Arrieta, Barranquilla
November 27, 1970	WP: Jim Crawford		LP: R. Rivera	Estadio Tomás Arrieta, Barranquilla

November 27, 1970	Colombia	5–2	Nicaragua	Estadio Tomás Arrieta, Barranquilla
November 27, 1970	WP: A. Jaramillo		LP: J. Juarez	Estadio Tomás Arrieta, Barranquilla

November 27, 1970	Dominican Republic	2–0	Canada	Estadio Once de Noviembre, Cartagena
November 27, 1970	WP: E. Arias		LP: M. Gage Cole	Estadio Once de Noviembre, Cartagena

November 27, 1970	Italy	6–2	Netherlands	Estadio Once de Noviembre, Cartagena
November 27, 1970	WP: G. Silva		LP: E. Westrenen	Estadio Once de Noviembre, Cartagena

November 27, 1970	Puerto Rico	8–1	Venezuela	Estadio Once de Noviembre, Cartagena
November 27, 1970	WP: C.V. Lowell		LP: A. Yánez	Estadio Once de Noviembre, Cartagena

November 28, 1970	Puerto Rico	9–1	Netherlands Antilles	Estadio Tomás Arrieta, Barranquilla
November 28, 1970	WP: L. Torres		LP: R. Moesker	Estadio Tomás Arrieta, Barranquilla

November 28, 1970	Venezuela	6–3	Nicaragua	Estadio Tomás Arrieta, Barranquilla
November 28, 1970	WP: A. Yánez		LP: S. Lacayo	Estadio Tomás Arrieta, Barranquilla

November 28, 1970	United States	3–0	Cuba	Estadio Tomás Arrieta, Barranquilla
November 28, 1970	WP: Burt Hooton		LP: Santiago Mederos	Estadio Tomás Arrieta, Barranquilla

November 29, 1970	Puerto Rico	6–3	Nicaragua	Estadio Once de Noviembre, Cartagena
November 29, 1970	WP: S. Quiñones		LP: J. Juarez	Estadio Once de Noviembre, Cartagena

November 29, 1970	Cuba	4–0	Guatemala	Estadio Once de Noviembre, Cartagena
November 29, 1970	WP: E. Salgado		LP: R. Iriarte	Estadio Once de Noviembre, Cartagena

November 29, 1970	United States	4–1	Colombia	Estadio Once de Noviembre, Cartagena
November 29, 1970	WP: Rich Troedson		LP: R. Morelos	Estadio Once de Noviembre, Cartagena

November 29, 1970	Netherlands	9–3	Netherlands Antilles	Estadio Tomás Arrieta, Barranquilla
November 29, 1970	WP: B. Brouwer		LP: L. Reyes	Estadio Tomás Arrieta, Barranquilla

November 29, 1970	Dominican Republic	10–1	Italy	Estadio Tomás Arrieta, Barranquilla
November 29, 1970	WP: C. Graciano		LP: G. Lercker	Estadio Tomás Arrieta, Barranquilla

November 29, 1970	Venezuela	9–1	Canada	Estadio Tomás Arrieta, Barranquilla
November 29, 1970	WP: D. Bravo		LP: L. Webster	Estadio Tomás Arrieta, Barranquilla

November 30, 1970	Venezuela	11–1	Italy	Estadio Once de Noviembre, Cartagena
November 30, 1970	WP: A. Córdova		LP: G. Bertoni	Estadio Once de Noviembre, Cartagena

November 30, 1970	United States	6–4	Dominican Republic	Estadio Once de Noviembre, Cartagena
November 30, 1970	WP: Mike Caldwell		LP: R. Rodríguez	Estadio Once de Noviembre, Cartagena

November 30, 1970	Puerto Rico	18–2	Guatemala	Estadio Tomás Arrieta, Barranquilla
November 30, 1970	WP: J. Guilbe		LP: R. Rivera	Estadio Tomás Arrieta, Barranquilla

November 30, 1970	Canada	4–0	Netherlands	Estadio Tomás Arrieta, Barranquilla
November 30, 1970	WP: L. Lisowsky		LP: R. Renooij	Estadio Tomás Arrieta, Barranquilla

November 30, 1970	Cuba	10–0	Nicaragua	Estadio Tomás Arrieta, Barranquilla
November 30, 1970	WP: Gaspar Legón		LP: J. Hurtado	Estadio Tomás Arrieta, Barranquilla

December 1, 1970	Puerto Rico	2–1	Canada	Estadio Tomás Arrieta, Barranquilla
December 1, 1970	WP: L. Torres		LP: M. Gage Cole	Estadio Tomás Arrieta, Barranquilla

December 1, 1970	Netherlands Antilles	7–6	Nicaragua	Estadio Once de Noviembre, Cartagena
December 1, 1970	WP: J. Stroop		LP: S. Lacayo	Estadio Once de Noviembre, Cartagena

December 1, 1970	Cuba	6–0	Colombia	Estadio Once de Noviembre, Cartagena
December 1, 1970	WP: M. Hurtado		LP: A. Jaramillo	Estadio Once de Noviembre, Cartagena

December 1, 1970	Dominican Republic	15–6	Netherlands	Estadio Once de Noviembre, Cartagena
December 1, 1970	WP: B. Guigni		LP: R. Dom	Estadio Once de Noviembre, Cartagena

December 2, 1970	Colombia	9–0	Guatemala	Estadio Once de Noviembre, Cartagena
December 2, 1970	WP: O. García		LP: O. García	Estadio Once de Noviembre, Cartagena

=== Tie-breaker series ===
Pos	Team	Pld	W	L	RF	RA	RD	PCT	GB
1	Cuba	2	2	0	8	4	+4	1.000	—
2	United States	2	0	2	4	8	−4	.000	2

December 2, 1970	Cuba	3–1	United States	Estadio Once de Noviembre, Cartagena
December 2, 1970	WP: José Antonio Huelga		LP: Burt Hooton	Estadio Once de Noviembre, Cartagena

December 4, 1970	Cuba	5–3	United States	Estadio Once de Noviembre, Cartagena
December 4, 1970	WP: José Antonio Huelga		LP: Rich Troedson	Estadio Once de Noviembre, Cartagena

== Final standings ==
Pos	Team	W	L
1st place, gold medalist(s)	Cuba	12	1
2nd place, silver medalist(s)	United States	10	3
3rd place, bronze medalist(s)	Puerto Rico	9	2
4	Colombia	8	3
5	Venezuela	7	4
6	Dominican Republic	6	5
7	Nicaragua	4	7
8	Netherlands Antilles	3	8
9	Italy	1	9
10	Canada	1	9
11	Netherlands	1	10

== Honors and awards ==
=== Statistical leaders ===
Batting leaders
Statistic	Name	Total
Batting average	(Colombia) Abel Leal	.477
Hits	(Colombia) Abel Leal	21
Runs	4 tied with (Note: Félix Isasi (CUB), Wilfredo Sánchez (CUB), Abel Leal (COL), Wilson Pérez (DOM))	12
Home runs	(Puerto Rico) Ramon Ortiz	3
Runs batted in	(Cuba) Félix Isasi	15
Stolen bases	(Colombia) Orlando Ramírez	8

Pitching leaders
Statistic	Name	Total
Wins	5 tied with (Note: Gaspar Legón (CUB), O. García (COL), Rich Troedson (USA), Mike Caldwell (USA), A. Córdova (VEN))	3
Earned run average	(United States) Burt Hooton	0.00
Strikeouts	(United States) Burt Hooton	44

=== Awards ===
Award	Player	Ref.
Most Valuable Player	(Colombia) Abel Leal	
