= Édgar Rentería =

Colombian baseball player (born 1975)

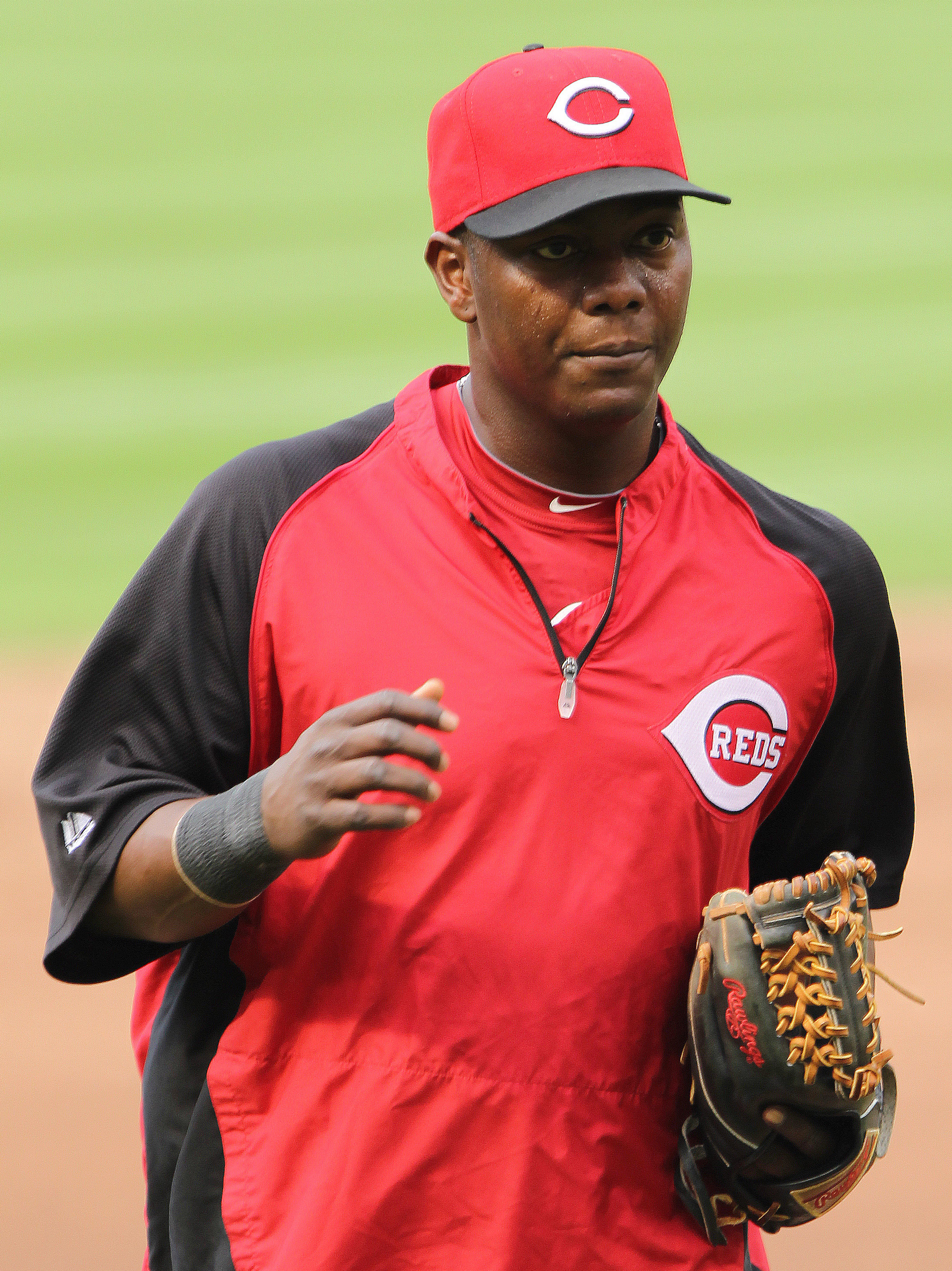
- Rentería with the Cincinnati Reds in 2011
- Shortstop
- Born: August 7, 1975 (age 51); Barranquilla, Colombia
- Batted: Right Threw: Right

MLB debut
- May 10, 1996, for the Florida Marlins

Last MLB appearance
- September 28, 2011, for the Cincinnati Reds

MLB statistics
- Batting average: .286
- Hits: 2,327
- Home runs: 140
- Runs batted in: 923
- Stats at Baseball Reference

Teams
- Florida Marlins (1996–1998); St. Louis Cardinals (1999–2004); Boston Red Sox (2005); Atlanta Braves (2006–2007); Detroit Tigers (2008); San Francisco Giants (2009–2010); Cincinnati Reds (2011)

Career highlights and awards
- 5× All-Star (1998, 2000, 2003, 2004, 2006); 2× World Series champion (1997, 2010); World Series MVP (2010); 2× Gold Glove Award (2002, 2003); 3× Silver Slugger Award (2000, 2002, 2003); St. Louis Cardinals Hall of Fame

Édgar Enrique Rentería Herazo (Spanish pronunciation: [ˈeðɣaɾ renteˈɾi.a]; born August 7, 1975), nicknamed "the Barranquilla Baby", is a Colombian former professional baseball shortstop. He played 16 seasons in Major League Baseball (MLB) for the Florida Marlins, St. Louis Cardinals, Boston Red Sox, Atlanta Braves, Detroit Tigers, San Francisco Giants, and Cincinnati Reds. Rentería finished second to Todd Hollandsworth in the 1996 Rookie of the Year Award balloting. In 1997, his RBI single off Charles Nagy in the eleventh inning of Game 7 of the 1997 World Series won the first World Series in Marlins' history over the Cleveland Indians. In the 2010 World Series against the Texas Rangers, Rentería won the World Series Most Valuable Player Award with the San Francisco Giants after he hit game-winning home runs in Game 2 and Game 5. Rentería was inducted into the St. Louis Cardinals Hall of Fame in 2025.

== Early life ==
Rentería was born on August 7, 1975, in Barranquilla, Colombia. As a youth, he attended Instituto Los Alpes High School in Barranquilla. After high school, he was signed by the Florida Marlins at the age of 16 by scout Levy Ochoa.

== Professional career ==
=== Minor leagues ===
Rentería started his professional career in 1992 with the Gulf Coast League Marlins. He had a .288 batting average and 47 hits in 43 games that year. However, his fielding percentage was only .897, and he made 24 errors. In 1993, he played for the Kane County Cougars of the Midwest League. He only batted .203 in 116 games with them, but he only committed 34 errors that year, and his fielding percentage increased to .934.

In 1994, Rentería was promoted to the Brevard County Manatees of the Florida State League. His average went up to .253 and his fielding percentage climbed to .959. 1995 saw Rentería have a breakout season with the Portland Sea Dogs of the Eastern League. He batted .289 with the team, and he hit seven home runs and stole thirty bases. Entering the 1996 season, Baseball America ranked Rentería as the best prospect in the Marlins' organization. He started the season with the Charlotte Knights of the International League, and he batted .278 with two home runs and fifteen runs batted in in 28 games with them.

=== Florida Marlins (1996–1998) ===
==== 1996 ====
On May 9, Rentería was called up to the Marlins following an injury to shortstop Kurt Abbott. His first game came on May 10, in a 4–2 win over the Colorado Rockies, when he entered the game in the ninth inning as part of a double switch. He did not have any at-bats in that game, though, and he was just a backup infielder when he first came up because Alex Arias had replaced Abbott as the everyday shortstop. However, Rentería replaced Arias as the starting shortstop on May 19 against the Chicago Cubs. He got his first hit (a single) in his first at bat (against Steve Trachsel) in a 3–2 Marlins victory. He got four hits in a game for the first time on June 10 in a 5–2 win over the Montreal Expos. His first home run came the next day, off Ugueth Urbina of the Expos, in a 3–2 loss.

Rentería did so well as a shortstop that the Marlins moved Abbott over to second base when he came off the disabled list. On June 23, Rentería strained a hamstring on a groundout in the sixth inning of a 5–3 loss to the Pittsburgh Pirates. He was placed on the disabled list the next day, but he remained the starting shortstop when he returned on July 11. From July 25 to August 16 he had a 22-game hitting streak, which was the longest for a rookie since Jerome Walton of the Chicago Cubs had a thirty-game streak in 1989. Rentería finished the season with a .309 batting average, 68 runs scored, and sixteen stolen bases in 106 games. He was second behind Los Angeles Dodgers outfielder Todd Hollandsworth in National League (NL) Rookie of the Year Award balloting.

==== 1997 ====
In 1997, Rentería hit the first inside-the-park home run of his career to tie a game against the Cincinnati Reds on April 5, and he won the game 4–3 with an RBI single in the eleventh inning. On April 27, he had a game–winning single in the ninth inning that gave the Marlins a 4–3 win over the Dodgers. From May 13 to 29, he had a 13-game hitting streak. From July 16 through July 18, he had three hits in three straight games. On August 15, his RBI single in the ninth inning gave the Marlins a 6–5 victory over Pittsburgh. Rentería finished the season with a .277 batting average, 171 hits, and 32 stolen bases in 154 games. That year, the Florida Marlins won the wild card to advance to the playoffs for the first time in their history.

In Game 1 of the 1997 National League Division Series (NLDS), Rentería's RBI single in the bottom of the ninth off Roberto Hernández gave the Marlins a 2–1 victory over the San Francisco Giants. The Marlins swept the Giants in the series and defeated the Atlanta Braves in the 1997 National League Championship Series (NLCS) to face the Cleveland Indians in the World Series. In Game 7, with the score tied at two and two out in the eleventh inning, Rentería hit a walk-off RBI single off Charles Nagy to score Craig Counsell. The hit won the game 3–2 and won the first World Series in Marlins' history.

==== 1998 ====
In 1998, Rentería had a .302 batting average by the All-Star break, and he was the only Marlin selected to the MLB All-Star Game. His RBI single in the eleventh inning on May 1 gave the Marlins a 6–5 victory over the San Diego Padres. He had a fourteen-game hitting streak from June 8 to 22, which was the longest by a Marlin in 1998. During the streak, on June 9, he had his first career pinch hit when he singled home Dave Berg in the ninth inning to give the Marlins a 5–4 win over the Toronto Blue Jays. Also, on June 14, he scored the winning run in a 5–4 win over the New York Mets. For his contributions from June 8 through 14, he won the NL Player of the Week Award.

On July 13, he scored four runs (which tied a Florida record) in an 8–7 win over the Expos. On August 24, he sprained his right knee sliding into second base in the third inning of a 7–4 loss to San Francisco. He was placed on the disabled list the next day, but he was reactivated on September 9. He finished the year with a .282 batting average and 146 hits in 133 games, along with a career-high 41 stolen bases. On December 14, he was traded to the St. Louis Cardinals for Armando Almanza, Braden Looper, and Pablo Ozuna.

=== St. Louis Cardinals (1999–2004) ===
==== 1999 ====
On May 16, Rentería hit his first home run as a Cardinal off Ismael Valdes of the Dodgers in a 5–4 victory. He had three RBI, including the game-winner, on May 23 in an 8–3 victory over Los Angeles. He had two home runs on May 31 in a 5–2 win over Florida. On June 12, he had three hits, including a game–winning single in the fourteenth inning, in an 8–7 victory over the Detroit Tigers. From June 21 to July 1 he had a ten-game hitting streak, his longest of the season. On July 9, he had four hits in a 5–4 loss to the Giants. He had four hits again on August 31 in an 8–1 victory over the Marlins. On September 5, he stole four bases in a 13–9 win over the Milwaukee Brewers. He hit ten home runs in a season for the first time when he homered on September 10 in an 11–5 win over Pittsburgh. Rentería finished the season with a .275 batting average. He led the Cardinals with 154 games, 585 at-bats, 161 hits, 36 doubles, and 37 stolen bases (which was also the seventh most in the National League).

==== 2000 ====
In 2000, Rentería had a .273 average by the All–Star break, and he was selected to the All-Star Game to replace teammate Mark McGwire, who was injured. He homered in three straight games from April 9–11, and he set a new career high on the eleventh with four RBI in a 10–6 victory over the Houston Astros. On April 16, he reached base five times in a 14–13 loss to Colorado. On August 29, he hit his sixteenth home run of the year in a 3–1 loss to the Marlins. The home run broke Solly Hemus's record for most home runs by a Cardinals' shortstop. On September 4, his three-run triple gave the Cardinals a 4–2 win over the Expos.

He finished the season with a .278 batting average and 156 hits in 150 games. He led the Cardinals with 21 stolen bases, and his 76 RBI were the second most by a Cardinals' shortstop (in 1921 Doc Lavan had 82). His 76 RBI were also second only to Jim Edmonds's 108 that season, and he led the team with 32 doubles. He also won the National League's Silver Slugger Award for a shortstop. The Cardinals made the playoffs and swept the Atlanta Braves in the NLDS, but they were defeated in five games by the New York Mets in the NLCS.

==== 2001 ====
On April 4, 2001, Rentería went three-for-five and hit a 432-foot home run off Denny Neagle in a 13–9 loss to Colorado at Coors Field. On April 18, he walked and scored the winning run on a wild pitch by Randy Johnson in a 3–1 victory over the Arizona Diamondbacks. He had a pinch hit single on May 10 against Pittsburgh that provided the winning run in an 11–5 victory. His RBI single off John Rocker of Cleveland on July 8 gave the Cardinals a 4–3 victory. However, his batting average was only .226 by July 26. Rentería batted .299 in his last 58 games, though, to raise his batting average to .260 by the end of the season. During those games, Rentería had a ten-game hitting streak from August 8 to 17. Rentería finished the season with seventeen stolen bases, which led the Cardinals. In Game 3 of the 2001 NLDS, Rentería hit his first playoff home run, off Brian Anderson of Arizona, in a 5–3 loss. However, the Diamondbacks defeated the Cardinals in five games on their way to winning the World Series.

==== 2002 ====
Rentería enjoyed a better season in 2002. On April 10, he had three hits (including a game-tying single in the ninth inning) in a 6–5 win over Milwaukee. On May 6, he hit his first home run since August 20 of the previous year in a 6–5 loss to the Cubs. Four days later, he hit a game-winning home run off Cincinnati's closer Danny Graves in a 4–2 victory. On June 27, he hit his nineteenth double, which tied his 2001 season total. He got his one thousandth hit on July 26 off Jon Lieber of the Cubs in an 8–4 victory. Two nights later against the Cubs, he hit a three-run game-winning home run to cap off a six-run ninth inning by the Cardinals that won the game 10–9. Two nights after that, he hit two home runs in a 5–0 victory over the Marlins. On August 18, he hit his first career grand slam to lift the Cardinals to a 5–1 victory over the Philadelphia Phillies. He hit another grand slam on September 4 and had a career-high five RBI in a 10–5 victory over Cincinnati. He finished the season with a .305 batting average and 166 hits, and he won his second Silver Slugger Award. By the time Rentería reached the age of 25, he had accumulated 1,061 hits, the 17th highest total for a 25-year-old in MLB history. He also won his first Gold Glove Award, becoming the first Cardinals' shortstop to win the award since Baseball Hall of Fame member Ozzie Smith in 1992. Rentería only batted .194 in the playoffs, but the Cardinals made it all the way to the NLCS, where they were beaten by San Francisco in five games.

==== 2003 ====
On April 13, 2003, Rentería hit two home runs and had five RBI in an 11–8 victory over Houston. He had four RBI on April 29, in a 13–3 victory over the New York Mets. He got five hits in a game for the first time on June 12, in an 8–7 victory over the Boston Red Sox. The next day, Roger Clemens of the New York Yankees struck out Rentería for his four thousandth strikeout on the way to winning his three hundredth game as the Yankees beat the Cardinals 5–2. Rentería was selected to the All–Star Game after he had a .331 batting average by the break, and he became the first Cardinals' player since Delino DeShields in 1997 to have twenty stolen bases before the All–Star break. On September 18, he had four hits and five RBI in a 13–0 win over Milwaukee. He won his second Player of the Week Award after he had twelve runs batted in from September 15 to 21. On September 27, the final game of the season, Rentería became the first NL shortstop since Hubie Brooks in 1985 (and the first Cardinals' shortstop) to have one hundred RBI in a season when he had the game-winning RBI in a 3–2 win over Arizona. He finished the year fourth in the NL in stolen bases (34) and batting average (a career-high .330), and he won a Silver Slugger Award after setting career highs in hits (194) and doubles (47, which set a Cardinal single-season record for doubles by a shortstop, besting Dick Groat's 43 in 1963). He also won a Gold Glove Award, and he became the first Cardinals' shortstop to win Silver Slugger Awards and Gold Glove Awards in back-to-back years.

==== 2004 ====
On April 10, 2004, Rentería had four hits in a 10–2 victory over Arizona. On June 9, against Mark Prior, he hit his third career grand slam in a 12–4 victory over the Cubs. He had a ten-game hitting streak, his best of the year, from June 22 to July 3. During the streak, on June 26 against the Kansas City Royals, his RBI single in the tenth inning gave the Cardinals a 3–1 victory. Also, on July 2, he scored four runs in an 11–2 victory over the Seattle Mariners. He was one of three Cardinals selected to the All-Star Game. He had four hits again on July 15 in a 7–2 win over Cincinnati. On August 8, he had five hits in a 6–2 win over the Mets. He had five RBI on August 22 in an 11–4 victory over Pittsburgh. Rentería finished the year with a .287 batting average, and he had ten home runs, 72 RBI, and 84 runs. The Cardinals made the World Series that year, but they were swept by Boston. Rentería was the final batter of a World Series for the second time in his career, when he grounded out against Keith Foulke to end Game 4 as the Red Sox won their first World Series in 86 years, ending the Curse of the Bambino. Fox commentator Joe Buck famously called Rentería's grounder with:

Back to Foulke. Red Sox fans have longed to hear it: The Boston Red Sox are World Champions!

However, he was one of only three Cardinals position players to bat above .250 in the Series, as he batted .333. Following the year, he became a free agent.

=== Boston Red Sox (2005) ===
On December 19, 2004, the Boston Red Sox signed Rentería to a four-year, $40 million contract with an option for 2009 to replace free agent Orlando Cabrera at shortstop. On April 14, 2005, he hit his first home run with the Red Sox off Randy Johnson of the Yankees. His double in the eighth inning of that game was the game winner in an 8–5 victory for Boston. From May 26 to 29, he had four straight games with at least three hits, the longest streak since George Brett had six (the record) in 1976. During that stretch, on May 28, 2005, he went three for three with a grand slam and five RBI in a 17–1 victory over the Yankees. The next day, he had four hits, including a home run, in a 7–2 victory over New York. For his efforts that week, he won his third career Player of the Week Award. He set a new career high for hits in a month when he had forty hits in August, second in the major leagues. He had a game-winning single on September 24, 2005 off B. J. Ryan of the Baltimore Orioles in a 4–3 victory. The win moved the Red Sox into a tie with the Yankees for the AL East lead. He scored one hundred runs in a season for the first time when he scored both runs in a 7–2 loss to Toronto on September 28. He finished the year with a .276 batting average and 172 hits. He struggled defensively, though, as he led the major leagues with a career-high 30 errors, and Red Sox fans soon began booing him after he only batted .228 in April. Rentería batted only .231 in the 2005 ALDS as the Red Sox would lose the division series to the Chicago White Sox in just three games. The Red Sox were also disappointed with his performance, and on December 8 he was traded to the Atlanta Braves for prospect Andy Marte.

=== Atlanta Braves (2006–2007) ===
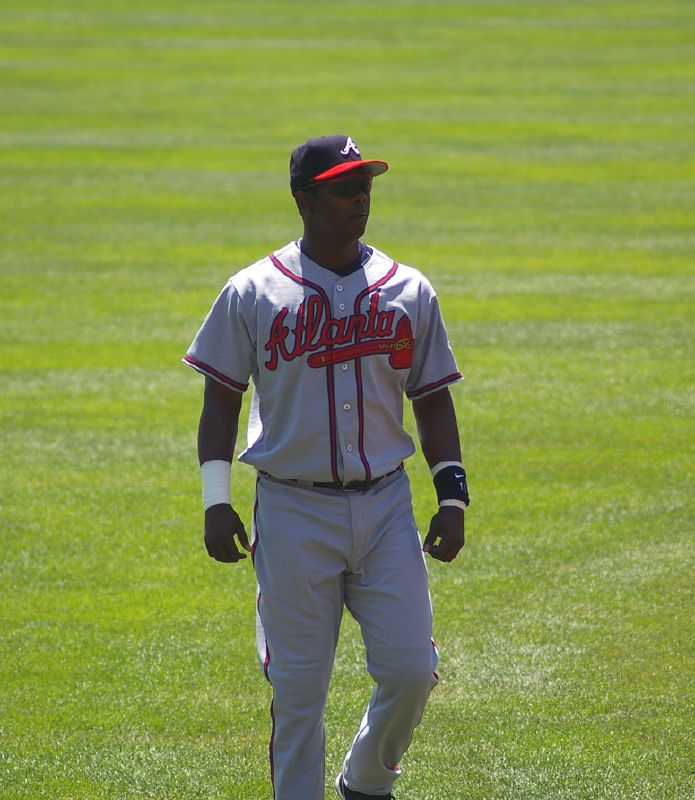
Rentería with the Braves in June 2007.

Rentería started 2006 with a 23-game hitting streak (counting the final game of 2005, it was 24 games). The 23-game streak in 2006 was the second longest that year and the longest to open the season since Ron LeFlore started 1976 with a thirty-game streak. He missed nine games after straining his rib cage on April 15 against San Diego, but he was not placed on the disabled list. On May 8, he had four hits and hit two home runs for the first time since 2003 in a 13–12 win over the Cubs. On July 3, he hit his one hundredth career home run off Anthony Reyes in a 6–3 victory over St. Louis. He was selected to the 2006 All-Star Game after he batted .318 with nine home runs in the first half of the season. On August 17, he had his first hit in 24 at-bats in a 5–0 win over the Washington Nationals. He finished the year with a .293 batting average, fourteen home runs, and seventy RBI. His defense also flourished, as he only committed thirteen errors.

On Opening Day (April 2) in 2007, Rentería hit two home runs (including the game-winning one in the tenth) in a 5–3 victory over Philadelphia. He became the third Atlanta Brave to hit two home runs on Opening Day, joining Fred McGriff and Joe Torre. From April 20 to May 12, he had an eighteen-game hitting streak, which was the longest by a Brave in 2007. During the streak, he had four hits for the twentieth time in his career on April 27 in a 9–7 victory over Colorado. On May 15, he hit two home runs in a 6–2 win over the Nationals. He had four hits on May 30 in a 9–3 win over the Brewers. He had five hits for the first time since 2004 on June 16 in a 6–2 victory over the Indians. On August 3, he was placed on the disabled list for the first time since 1998 after he sprained his ankle the previous day. Rentería returned on August 22, but he returned to the DL a day later when he re-injured his ankle after facing only one pitch. He was activated again on September 7, and he returned to the Braves' lineup the next day. He finished the year with a .332 batting average (tied for third in the NL and a new career high), twelve home runs, and 57 RBI. He was one of only four major league shortstops in 2007 to bat over .300 with over ten home runs and fifty RBI (the others were Derek Jeter, Hanley Ramírez, and Miguel Tejada). However, because of the emergence of shortstop prospect Yunel Escobar, Rentería was traded to the Detroit Tigers on October 29 for Jair Jurrjens and Gorkys Hernández.

=== Detroit Tigers (2008) ===
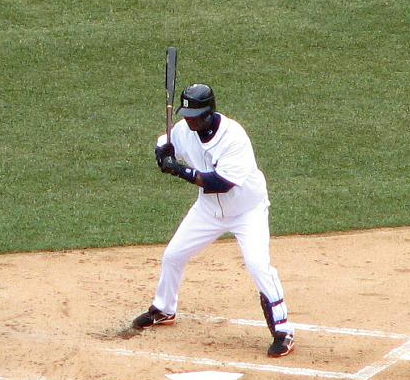
Rentería batting for the Tigers on March 31, 2008.

On April 16, 2008, Rentería hit his fifth career grand slam and had five RBI in a 13–2 victory over the Indians. He had four hits on April 22 in a 10–2 win over the Rangers. He had four hits again and five RBI in a 12–8 victory over Seattle on May 20. He hit his sixth career grand slam on June 7 in an 8–4 victory over the Indians. On June 17, he had his two thousandth hit (off Jonathan Sánchez) in a 5–1 victory over San Francisco. He finished the year with a .270 batting average, 136 hits, and ten home runs. After the season, the Tigers declined his option on October 30, and they chose not to offer arbitration on December 1, which made him a free agent.

=== San Francisco Giants (2009-2010) ===
==== 2009 ====
On December 4, 2008, Rentería signed a two-year, $18.5 million deal with the San Francisco Giants with an option for 2011. He had five RBIs and became the first player to hit a grand slam off Jake Peavy in an 8–3 victory over San Diego on April 21, 2009. On April 29, he had four hits in a 9–4 victory over the Dodgers. He tied an eventual 7–4 loss to the Mets on May 14 with a single in the eighth inning, but he strained a hamstring advancing to first base and had to leave the game with an injury. He missed six games with the injury before he returned to the lineup on May 22. From May 8 through June 6, despite batting only .250, he reached base safely in twenty straight games. He had a game-winning grand slam on August 30, which gave the Giants a 9–5 win over Colorado. He missed nineteen of the final twenty games of the season with biceps tendonitis and a sprained AC joint, and on September 26 he had surgery to remove bone spurs and chips from his right elbow. Dealing with injuries all year, Rentería finished the season with a career-low .250 batting average and only 115 hits and 48 RBI.

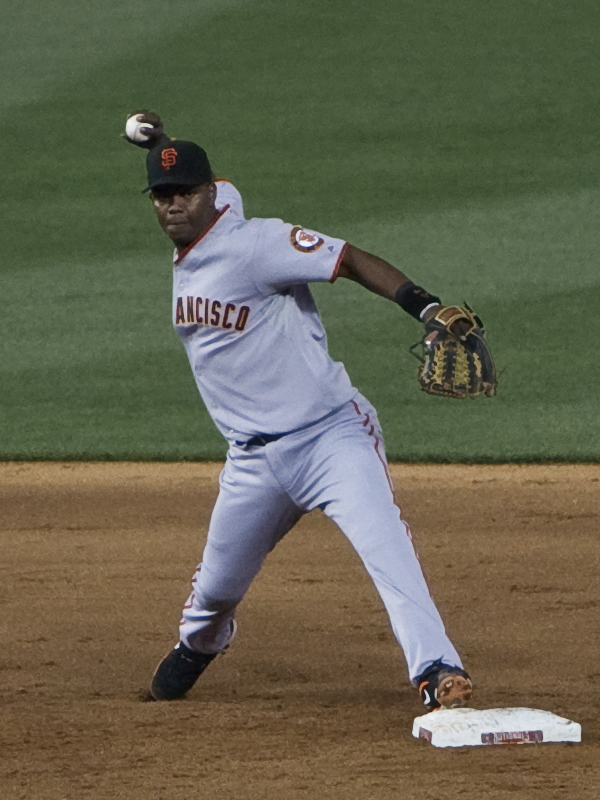
Rentería playing for the Giants in June 2009

==== 2010 ====
On April 7, 2010, Rentería had five hits (in five at-bats) in a 10–4 victory over Houston. He started the season well, as he was batting .320 through April 30. However, on April 30, he was forced to leave a game against Colorado after two innings with an injured groin. After missing four games, he returned to the lineup on May 6, but he left that game after two innings when he reinjured the groin. He was placed on the disabled list the next day. He was activated from the DL on May 22, but, after three games, he strained a hamstring on May 25 and was placed on the disabled list again the next day. He returned to the Giants on June 19. However, he returned to the disabled list on August 11 with a biceps injury received the previous night. He returned to the Giants on September 1, but Giants' manager Bruce Bochy announced that Juan Uribe, who had been playing well while substituting for Rentería at short, would remain the starting shortstop, which made Rentería a reserve player. He had four hits on September 16, in a 10–2 win over the Dodgers. On September 23, with the Giants trailing San Diego in the NL West, Rentería delivered a speech during a team meeting in which he told his teammates it could be his last year, and he wanted the Giants to make the playoffs. The Giants managed to overtake San Diego, and they did make the playoffs. Rentería finished the year with career-lows in games (72), hits (67), home runs (three, tied with his 1998 total), and RBI (22). During the season, he also began contemplating retirement.

==== 2010 postseason ====
In the 2010 NLCS against Philadelphia, Rentería reclaimed a starting role when he started four games (the Giants benched third baseman Pablo Sandoval and shifted Uribe to third base). He only had one hit in the series, but he scored the winning run in the Giants' 3–0 victory in Game 3, and he retained the starting job in the World Series. In Game 2 of the series, against the Texas Rangers, he broke a scoreless tie in the fifth inning when he homered off C. J. Wilson to give the Giants a 1–0 lead. He later added a two-run single in the eighth inning as the Giants won 9–0. Before Game 5, with the Giants leading the series 3–1, Rentería joked with teammate Andrés Torres that he was going to hit a home run. In the seventh inning, with runners at second and third, two outs, and no score, Rentería hit a three-run home run off Rangers' pitcher Cliff Lee that won the series for the Giants. The feat made him only the fourth player to have two series-winning hits in history, along with Yogi Berra, Joe DiMaggio, and Lou Gehrig. For his contributions, he was named the 2010 World Series Most Valuable Player, making him the first player from Colombia to achieve this feat. The Giants declined his option on November 5, but Rentería did announce that he planned to play in 2011. The Giants did offer him a one-year, $1 million contract as a utility player, but Rentería declined.

=== Cincinnati Reds (2011) ===
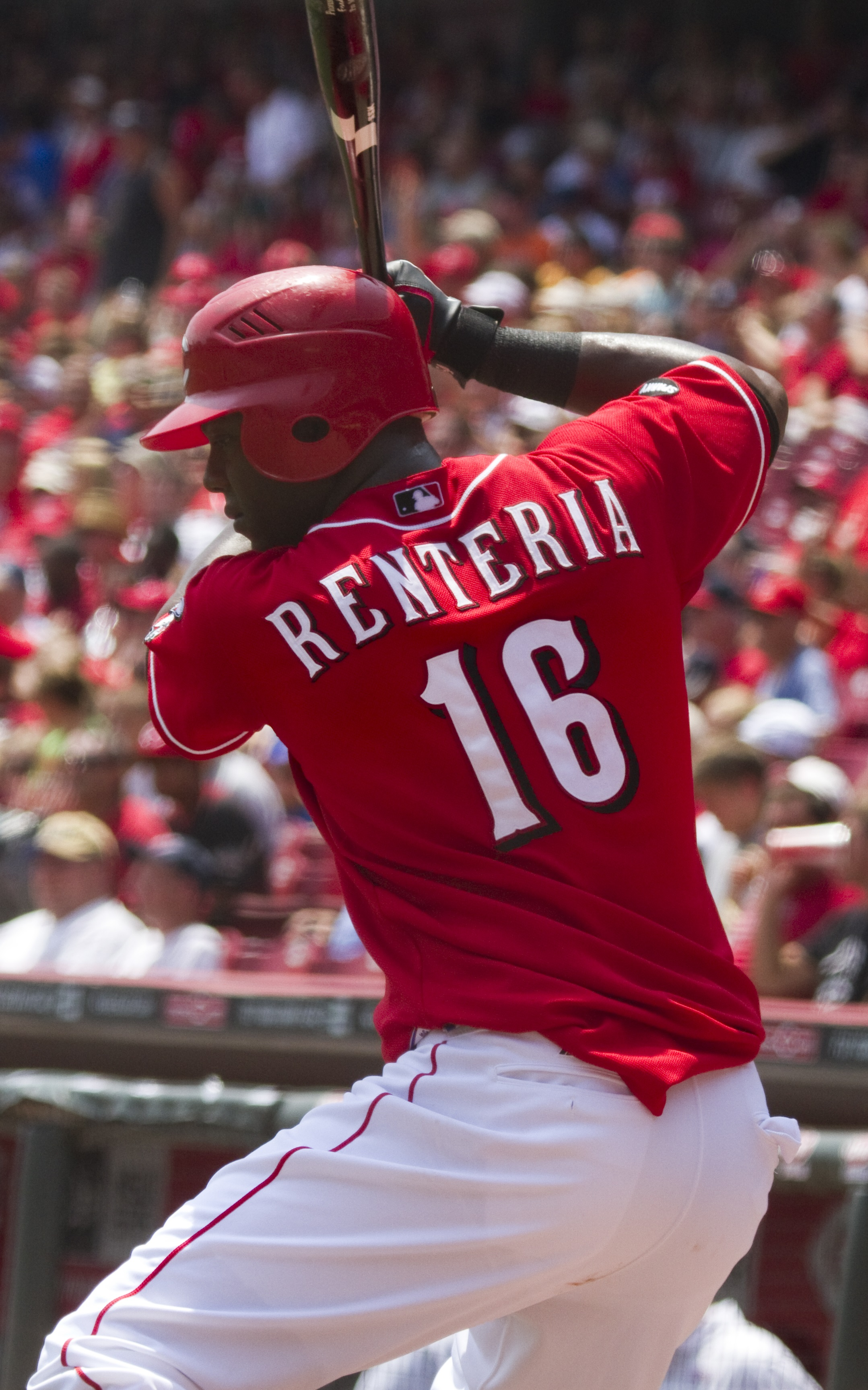
Rentería on July 28, 2011

On January 7, 2011, Rentería signed a one-year contract with the Cincinnati Reds worth $2.1 million plus another $900,000 in performance bonuses. He began the season as a utility player, since Paul Janish began the year at shortstop. Through 2011, he led all active major league shortstops in career errors, with 272.

In 2012, he received interest and offers from multiple teams, including the Milwaukee Brewers, but teams were told that he "intends to remain retired."

=== Retirement ===
On March 22, 2013, Rentería formally retired from Major League Baseball.

=== Career statistics ===
In 2,152 games over 16 seasons, Rentería posted a .286 batting average (2,327-for-8,142) with 1,200 runs, 436 doubles, 29 triples, 140 home runs, 923 RBI, 294 stolen bases, 718 bases on balls, .343 on-base percentage and .398 slugging percentage. He finished his career with a .970 fielding percentage. In 66 postseason games, he hit .252 (61-for-242) with 37 runs, 12 doubles, 3 home runs, 23 RBI, 9 stolen bases and 24 walks.

== Accomplishments ==
- Delivered the game-winning single off Charles Nagy in the bottom of the eleventh inning in Game 7 of the 1997 World Series.
- Five-time All-Star (1998, 2000, 2003, 2004, 2006)
- Two-time Gold Glove Award winner (2002–03)
- Three-time Silver Slugger Award winner for shortstop (2000, 2002–03)
- Had a 24-game hitting streak spanning the last game of 2005 and his first 23 games of 2006.
- Had his 2,000th career hit on June 18, 2008, off Jonathan Sánchez of the San Francisco Giants.
- Named the 2010 World Series MVP after hitting game-winning home runs in Games 2 and 5 of the series. He is the fourth player to have multiple World Series-winning hits, along with Yogi Berra, Joe DiMaggio, and Lou Gehrig, and the first to do it for two separate franchises.
- Elected to the St Louis Cardinals Hall of Fame - inductee class of 2025 - along with Walt Jocketty and Al Hrabosky. He was enshrined on Saturday September 6, 2025

== Personal life ==
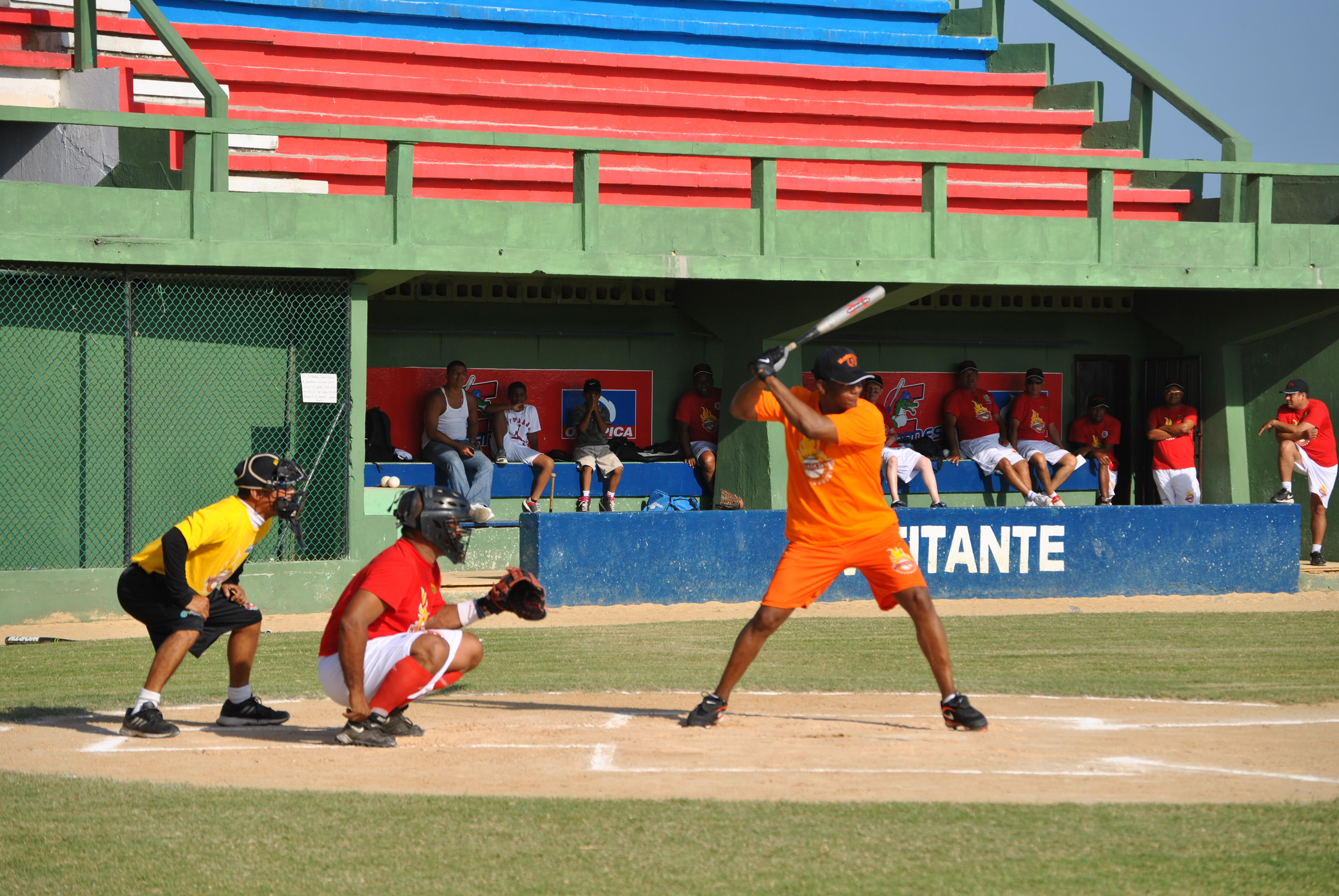
Rentería at bat in an exhibition game in Barranquilla.

Rentería has two brothers, Evert and Édinson Rentería, who played minor league baseball. In 1998, Rentería and his brother Edinson created Team Rentería to help Colombian baseball by giving professional instruction to Colombian professional baseball players and holding youth clinics for amateurs. In 1999, Team Rentería founded the Colombian Professional Baseball League. The league is still in existence today, although the 2010–11 season was cancelled due to harsh weather. In 1997, Colombian president Ernesto Samper presented Rentería with Colombia's highest honor, the "San Carlos Cross of the Order of the Great Knight".

In 2010, it was announced that the baseball stadium replacing the former Estadio Tomás Arrieta in his hometown of Barranquilla would be renamed in Rentería's honor. The Estadio Édgar Rentería opened in 2018, and currently houses the Caimanes de Barranquilla of the Colombian Professional Baseball League.

== See also ==
- List of Gold Glove Award winners at shortstop
- List of Major League Baseball career doubles leaders
- List of Major League Baseball career stolen bases leaders
