= Baseball at the 1973 Bolivarian Games =

- Venue: Estadio Juan Demóstenes Arosemena

Medalists
gold medal	Colombia
silver medal	Venezuela
bronze medal	Panama

Baseball was contested at the 1973 Bolivarian Games, held in Panama City, Panama. All of the games were played at the Estadio Juan Demóstenes Arosemena. Three nations participated: Colombia, Panama, and Venezuela.

Colombia won its first gold medal at the Bolivarian Games, after achieving a major upset victory against Venezuela, which traditionally dominated the tournament. The team was managed by Antonio "Manía" Torres, and included players such as Abel Leal and José Miguel Corpas. (Note: Jaime Ayola Cano lists several players including himself: Abel Leal, "Chino" Herrera, "El Ñato" Velásquez, el "Zurdo' Peñaloza, Marcial Del Valle, José Miguel Corpas, Evaristo Martínez, Juan Ruiz, Milciades Mejía, Remberto Madera, Anastasio Barrios, Manuel Jiménez, Erasmo Marimón, René Morelos, Orlando "El Caballo" García, and Amaury Espinos.)

Venezuela opened the tournament with a 3–2 victory over Panama on February 18, decided in extra innings. Anchored by pitcher Félix Valenilla, Venezuela went on to win all three games against Panama. It fell to Colombia thrice: in the second round, by a score of 10–5; and a climactic 4–3 loss on February 28 that secured Colombia the gold. Colombia lost its final game to Panama, though it did not affect the standings.

== Final standings ==
Pos	Team	W	L
Gold medal	Colombia	4	2
Silver medal	Venezuela	3	3
Bronze medal	Panama	2	4

== Venue ==
Panama City, Panama	Baseball at the 1973 Bolivarian Games is located in Panama
Estadio Juan Demóstenes Arosemena	Baseball at the 1973 Bolivarian Games is located in Panama

== Medalists ==
Event	Gold	Silver	Bronze
Men's baseball	Colombia; Jaime Ayola Cano; Abel Leal; Luis "Chino" Herrera; Carlos "Ñato" Velásquez; Julio "Zurdo" Peñaloza; Marcial Del Valle; José Miguel Corpas; Evaristo Martínez; Juan Ruiz; Milciades Mejía; Remberto Madera; Anastasio Barrios; Manuel Jiménez; Erasmo Marimón; René Morelos; Orlando "Caballo" García; Amaury Espinos; Rafael "Cotorra" Moreno; Juvenal Mitchel Manager: Antonio Torres	Venezuela; Victor William; Félix Valenilla; E. Ovalle; William Gonzalez; León Quijada	Panama; Ronaldo Montero; Ruperto Cooper; Roy Blake; Emilio Castro
