= 1965 Amateur World Series =

Tournament details
- Country: Colombia
- Venue(s): 2 (in 2 host cities)
- Teams: 9
- Defending champions: Cuba

Final positions
- Champions: Colombia
- Runners-up: Mexico
- Third place: Puerto Rico
- Fourth place: Panama

The 1965 Amateur World Series was the 16th edition of the Amateur World Series of international baseball. The tournament was held from February 12 through February 27, 1965 in the Colombian cities of Cartagena and Barranquilla.

The tournament was marked by the absence of defending champions Cuba. The Colombian government, which had broken off diplomatic relations with Cuba following the Cuban Revolution, refused to grant visas to the team of Cuban players.

Colombia and Mexico both finished the regular tournament with a 7-1 record. In the tie-breaking playoff series, Colombia defeated Mexico two games to one, to win its second international championship; it had previously won the 1947 Amateur World Series, also held in Colombia.

== Participants ==
Though post-revolutionary Cuba had participated in the 1961 Amateur World Series, it was not without controversy as several Cuban players, including Bert Campaneris defected. In 1965, the situation was complicated by the fact that Colombia, the host of the series, had severed diplomatic ties with the Castro regime in 1961; the right-wing government of Guillermo León Valencia refused to issue visas to the Cuba national team. Cuba protested the move, and International Olympic Committee president Avery Brundage attempted to intervene on Cuba's behalf, but he was rebuffed by Carlos Manuel Zecca, president of the International Baseball Federation (FIBA). Though Houston Astros scout Tony Pacheco expressed interest in forming a "Free Cuba" team composed of Cuban exiles to compete, ultimately no squad representing Cuba appeared in the 1965 tournament. Pacheco would ultimately pilot the Colombian team.

=== Invited teams ===
Caribbean (3)

- ~~Cuba~~ (did not attend) (Note: Cuba was invited by FIBA, but the team's visas were denied by the Colombian government.)
- Puerto Rico
- Dominican Republic
- Netherlands Antilles

Central America (5)

- Nicaragua
- Mexico
- Panama
- El Salvador
- Guatemala

South America (1)

- Colombia (hosts)

== Tournament summary ==
The tournament was dominated by Colombia, the hosts, and Mexico. It saw two notable pitching feats: a perfect game, thrown by Mexico's David Garcia against Guatemala on February 14; and a 19-strikeout game (a tournament record for a single game) thrown by Puerto Rico's Efrain Contreras against the Dutch Antilles on February 22.

== Group stage ==
The group stage featured a round robin format to determine the medal winners. Since Mexico and Colombia tied for first with a 7–1 record, a best-of-three tie-breaker round was played.

Pos	Team	Pld	W	L	PCT	GB	COL	MEX	PUR	PAN	DOM	NCA	GUA	AHO	SLV
1	Colombia (H)	8	7	1	.875	—		5–4	2–3	2–1	3–2	4–0	9–0	3–0	15–1
2	Mexico	8	7	1	.875	—	4–5		7–3	2–1	3–1	1–0	1–0	6–0	6–2
3	Puerto Rico	8	5	3	.625	2	3–2	3–7		1–3	3–2	1–2	7–1	15–1	5–3
4	Panama	8	4	4	.500	3	1–2	1–2	3–1		6–3	1–0	1–5	2–6	7–1
5	Dominican Republic	8	4	4	.500	3	2–3	1–3	2–3	3–6		3–2	3–1	3–1	5–1
6	Nicaragua	8	4	4	.500	3	0–4	0–1	2–1	0–1	2–3		5–3	3–2	5–0
7	Guatemala	8	3	5	.375	4	0–9	0–1	1–7	5–1	1–3	3–5		4–2	4–1
8	Netherlands Antilles	8	2	6	.250	5	0–3	0–6	1–15	6–2	1–3	2–3	2–4		11–0
9	El Salvador	8	0	8	.000	7	1–15	2–6	3–5	1–7	1–5	0–5	1–4	0–11	

Source: Baseball.ch (archived)
(H) Hosts

== Tie-breaker ==
Pos	Team	Pld	W	L	RF	RA	RD	PCT	GB
1	Colombia (H)	3	2	1	17	9	+8	.667	—
2	Mexico	3	1	2	9	17	−8	.333	1

Source: Baseball.ch (archived)
(H) Hosts

=== Results ===
25 February 1965	Colombia	2 – 4	Mexico	Estadio Once de Noviembre, Cartagena de Indias

26 February 1965	Mexico	5 – 11	Colombia	Estadio Once de Noviembre, Cartagena de Indias

27 February 1965	Colombia	4 – 0	Mexico	Estadio Once de Noviembre, Cartagena de Indias

== Final standings ==
Pos	Team	W	L
1st place, gold medalist(s)	Colombia	9	2
2nd place, silver medalist(s)	Mexico	7	1
3rd place, bronze medalist(s)	Puerto Rico	5	3
4	Panama	4	4
5	Dominican Republic	4	4
6	Nicaragua	4	4
7	Guatemala	3	5
8	Netherlands Antilles	2	6
9	El Salvador	0	8

== Statistical leaders ==
Batting leaders
Statistic	Name	Total
Batting average	(Puerto Rico) Andrés Cruz	.485
Hits	(Puerto Rico) Andrés Cruz	16
Runs	(Colombia) Luis de Arcos	12
Home runs	4 tied with (Note: J. Calvo (MEX), Ovidio Lara (SLV), Reinaldo Suárez (PAN), S. Jacobs (AHO))	1
Runs batted in	(Puerto Rico) Andrés Cruz	8
Stolen bases	(Panama) Urbano Camarena	5

Pitching leaders
Statistic	Name	Total
Wins	2 tied with (Note: Arthur Hudson (NIC), Luis Garcia (MEX)))	3
Earned run average	(Nicaragua) Arthur Hudson	0.00

== Bibliography ==
- "CON BLANQUEADA Cerro COLOMBIA" (in Spanish). El Tiempo. 28 February 1965. pp. 7–8.
