= Abel Leal =

Colombian baseball player (1940–2019)

- Third baseman
- Born: 28 March 1940; Cartagena, Colombia
- Died: 12 April 2019 (aged 79); Cartagena, Colombia
- Batted: Right Threw: Right

Career highlights and awards
- Amateur World Series MVP (1970)
Medals
Men's baseball
Representing Colombia
Amateur World Series
Silver medal – second place	1971 Havana	Team
Bronze medal – third place	1974 St. Petersburg	Team
Pan American Games
Bronze medal – third place	1971 Cali	Team
Bolivarian Games
Gold medal – first place	1973 Panama City	Team

Abel Leal Díaz (Note: In this Spanish name, the first or paternal surname is Leal and the second or maternal family name is Díaz.) (8 March 1940 – 12 April 2019) was a Colombian baseball player. Nicknamed El Tigre, he is best known for playing with the Colombia national baseball team, where he was named the most valuable player at the 1970 Amateur World Series.

Born in the El Cabrero neighborhood of Cartagena, Leal began his baseball career in 1966 with the Kola Román club of Colombia's amateur league, managed by Antonio Torres; there he was converted from a pitcher to third baseman, though he played only five games before being released. Signing with the Terminal club (operated by Colpuertos, the country's port authority), his performance there earned him a spot in the Bolívar department team. A powerful home run hitter, Leal is remembered for his iconic, game-tying homer in the 1972 national tournament with two outs, two strikes in the ninth inning against Atlántico.

Leal appeared with the Colombian national team in 14 editions of the Amateur World Series (later the Baseball World Cup). His best performance was at the 1970 Amateur World Series, where he won the batting title and earned the honor of MVP. He reportedly hit the longest home run ever at the Estadio Juan Demóstenes Arosemena in Panama City, and is honored by a plaque at the entrance of the stadium.

After his performances at the 1973 Bolivarian Games, where Leal's home run helped propel Colombia to a shocking upset over Venezuela, Leal was one of several Colombian players offered a contract to play in organized baseball in the United States; he declined, saying at the time that he was too old to move to the United States, and later added that he didn't want to endanger his pension with Colpuertos. He also declined offers to play in Venezuela's professional league, ostensibly because of discrimination against Colombians in Venezuela.

Leal retired from baseball in 1989, though he continued to play softball into his elder years. The historic Estadio Once de Noviembre in Cartagena was renamed in his honor.
