= José Luis Sandoval =

Mexican baseball player and coach (born 1968)

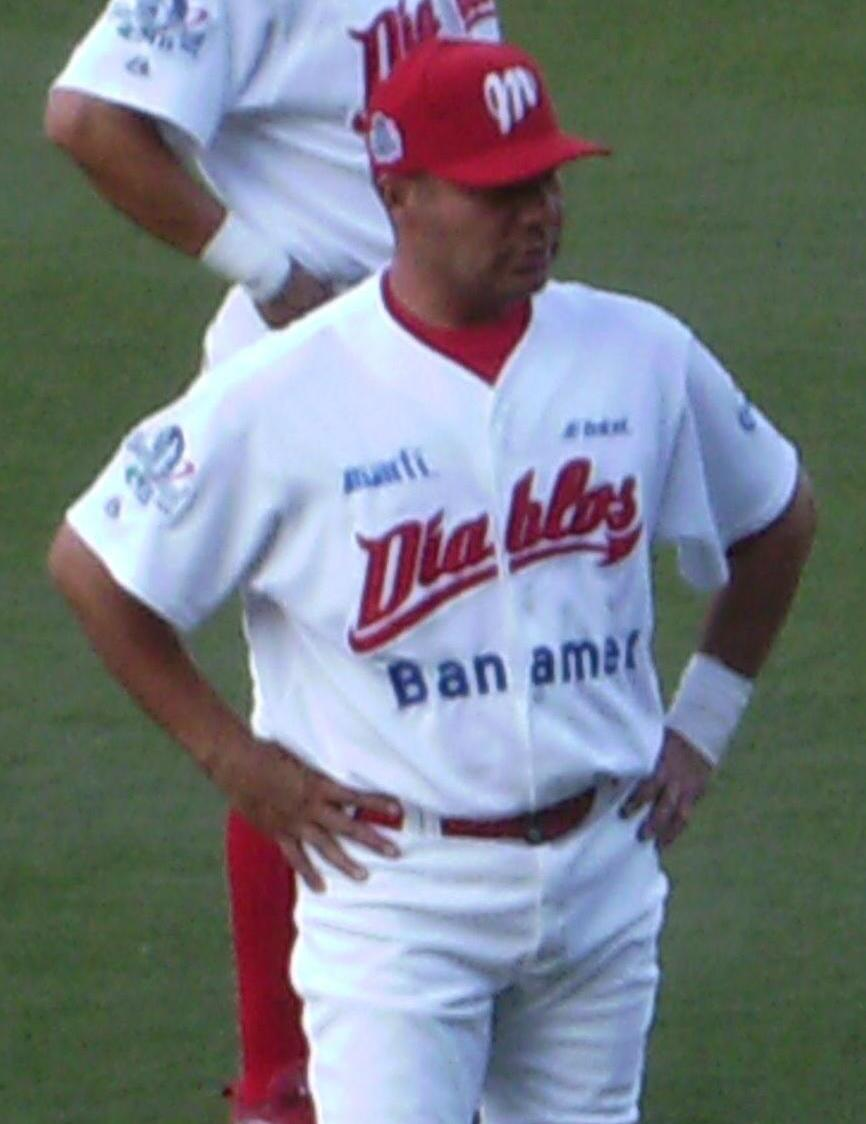
- Sandoval in 2008
- Shortstop / Coach
- Born: 25 August 1968 (age 57); Los Mochis, Sinaloa, Mexico
- Bats: Right Throws: Right

LMB statistics
- Batting average: .293
- Home runs: 253
- Runs batted in: 1,315

Teams
- Diablos Rojos del México (1990–1996); Saraperos de Saltillo (1997); Diablos Rojos del México (1998–2012)

Career highlights and awards
- Diablos Rojos del México #3 retired

Member of the Mexican Professional

Baseball Hall of Fame
- Induction: 2022
Medals
Men's baseball
Representing Mexico
Pan American Games
Bronze medal – third place	2007 Rio de Janeiro	Team
Central American and Caribbean Games
Bronze medal – third place	2006 Cartagena	Team

José Luis Sandoval Rodríguez (born 25 August 1968), nicknamed Borrego, is a Mexican professional baseball coach and former shortstop. As a player, Sandoval spent 23 seasons in the Mexican League, 22 of them with the Diablos Rojos del México winning the league championship in 1994, 1999, 2002, 2003 and 2008.

Sandoval represented Mexico at the 2006 Central American and Caribbean Games and the 2007 Pan American Games, winning the bronze medal in both tournaments.

== Playing career ==
=== Early career ===
Sandoval was born on 25 August 1968 in Los Mochis, Sinaloa and made his professional debut in the Mexican League in 1990 with the Diablos Rojos del México. In 1993 he was signed by the Pittsburgh Pirates and assigned to the Buffalo Bisons of the Triple-A American Association, where he played 65 games and recorded 48 hits, 23 runs, five home runs, 21 RBI and .230 batting average in 209 at bats.

=== Mexican League ===
After spending the 1993 season with the Bisons, he returned to the Mexican League (LMB) to play for the Diablos Rojos winning LMB championships in 1994, 1999, 2002, 2003 and 2008. He spent the 1997 season with the Saraperos de Saltillo, but played all other seasons with the Diablos Rojos.

On 19 May 2012, Sandoval received a special career award from the Mexican League during his final season. He retired after the 2012 season.

Mexican League career statistics
Seasons	G	AB	R	H	2B	3B	HR	RBI	SB	BB	BA	SLG
23	2219	7725	1171	2263	435	31	253	1315	59	754	.293	.456

=== Mexican Pacific League ===
Sandoval played 20 seasons in the Mexican Pacific League (LMP). He debuted in 1991 with the Naranjeros de Hermosillo, with whom he spent 19 seasons, and played his final season with the Yaquis de Obregón during the 2011–12 tournament. He won seven LMP championships: six with Hermosillo in 1992, 1994, 1995, 2001, 2007 and 2010, and one with Obregón in 2012.

Mexican Pacific League career statistics
Seasons	G	AB	R	H	2B	3B	HR	RBI	SB	BB	BA	SLG
21	1138	3858	455	953	163	5	98	471	26	319	.247	.368

== International career ==
Sandoval represented Mexico at the 2006 Central American and Caribbean Games, where he won the bronze medal. He was also part of the Mexican team that won the bronze medal at the 2007 Pan American Games in Rio de Janeiro. He appeared in four games, recording two runs, five hits, one double, three RBIs and a .313/.368/.375 batting line.

== Managerial career ==
In November 2015, Sandoval was hired as manager of the Diablos Rojos del México for the 2016 season, replacing Miguel Ojeda. The Diablos finished the season fifth in the North Division with a 57–54 record, failing to qualify for the playoffs.

In September 2017, Sandoval was appointed as manager of the Guerreros de Oaxaca ahead of the 2018 season, replacing Houston Jiménez. The 2018 season was contested in a two-tournament format and the Guerreros finished the first tournament last in the South Division with a 22–35 record. Sandoval was fired afterward and replaced by Joe Alvarez.

== Legacy ==
Sandoval's number 3 was retired by the Diablos Rojos del México (left) and by the Naranjeros de Hermosillo (right) in 2013.

On 23 March 2013, the Diablos Rojos honored José Luis Sandoval by retiring his number 3.

Sandoval was honored with a corrido titled Corrido del Borrego Sandoval, performed by Los Maxximos de Sinaloa.

In 2022, Sandoval was inducted in the Mexican Professional Baseball Hall of Fame alongside Matías Carrillo, Vinicio Castilla, Eduardo Jiménez, Isidro Márquez, Barney Serrell and journalist Jorge Menéndez Torre.

In February 2025, Sandoval was selected by a committee of journalists as the shortstop for the Mexican League Centennial All-Time Team on the occasion of the league's hundredth anniversary.

== Managerial statistics ==
=== Mexican League ===
Year	Team	Regular season						Postseason			
Year	Team	Games	Won	Lost	Tied	Pct.	Finish	Won	Lost	Pct.	Notes
2016	Diablos Rojos del México	112	57	54	1	.513	5th	–	–	–	–
2018	Guerreros de Oaxaca	57	22	35	0	.386	–	–	–	–	–
Total		169	79	89	1	.470		–	–	–	–
