= 1997 World Series =

93rd edition of Major League Baseball's championship series

Team (Wins)	Managers	Season
Florida Marlins (4)	Jim Leyland	92–70 (.568), GB: 9
Cleveland Indians (3)	Mike Hargrove	86–75 (.534), GA: 6
- Dates: October 18–26
- Venue(s): Pro Player Stadium (Florida); Jacobs Field (Cleveland)
- MVP: Liván Hernández (Florida)
- Umpires: Ed Montague (NL, crew chief), Dale Ford (AL), Joe West (NL), Greg Kosc (AL), Randy Marsh (NL), Ken Kaiser (AL)
- Hall of Famers: Marlins: Jim Leyland (manager); Indians: Jim Thome

Broadcast
- Television: NBC (United States); MLB International (International)
- TV announcers: Bob Costas, Joe Morgan, and Bob Uecker (NBC); Gary Thorne and Ken Singleton (MLB International)
- Radio: CBS; WQAM (FLA); WKNR (CLE)
- Radio announcers: Vin Scully and Jeff Torborg (CBS); Joe Angel and Dave O'Brien (WQAM); Herb Score and Tom Hamilton (WKNR)
- ALCS: Cleveland Indians over Baltimore Orioles (4–2)
- NLCS: Florida Marlins over Atlanta Braves (4–2)

The 1997 World Series was the championship series of Major League Baseball's (MLB) 1997 season. The 93rd edition of the World Series, it was a best-of-seven playoff between the American League (AL) champion Cleveland Indians and the National League (NL) champion Florida Marlins. The Marlins, who were underdogs, defeated the Indians, four games to three, to win their first World Series championship. Game 7 was decided in extra innings on a walk-off single hit by Édgar Rentería. The series began on October 18 and ended on October 26 (though Game 7 ended just after midnight local time October 27). Marlins pitcher Liván Hernández was named the World Series Most Valuable Player.

The Indians advanced to the World Series by defeating the New York Yankees in the AL Division Series, three games to two, and then the Baltimore Orioles in the AL Championship Series, four games to two; it was Cleveland's second World Series appearance in three years. The Marlins advanced to the World Series by defeating the San Francisco Giants in the NL Division Series, three games to none, and then the Atlanta Braves in the NL Championship Series, four games to two; the Marlins set an MLB record by reaching a World Series in just their fifth season of existence. This was the fourth time in World Series history a Game 7 went into extra innings, and was the most recent occasion until the 2016 World Series, in which the Indians also lost in extra innings. The Marlins' championship made them the first wild card team to ever win the World Series.

This was the only World Series that Paul Beeston would preside over as CEO of MLB. The previous four World Series had been presided over jointly by the league presidents (first Dr. Bobby Brown and then Gene Budig for the AL, Leonard Coleman for the NL).

== Summary ==
NL Florida Marlins (4) vs. AL Cleveland Indians (3)

Game	Date	Score	Location	Time	Attendance
1	October 18	Cleveland Indians – 4, Florida Marlins – 7	Pro Player Stadium	3:19	67,245
2	October 19	Cleveland Indians – 6, Florida Marlins – 1	Pro Player Stadium	2:48	67,025
3	October 21	Florida Marlins – 14, Cleveland Indians – 11	Jacobs Field	4:12	44,880
4	October 22	Florida Marlins – 3, Cleveland Indians – 10	Jacobs Field	3:15	44,887
5	October 23	Florida Marlins – 8, Cleveland Indians – 7	Jacobs Field	3:39	44,888
6	October 25	Cleveland Indians – 4, Florida Marlins – 1	Pro Player Stadium	3:15	67,498
7	October 26	Cleveland Indians – 2, Florida Marlins – 3 (11)	Pro Player Stadium	4:10	67,204

== Matchups ==
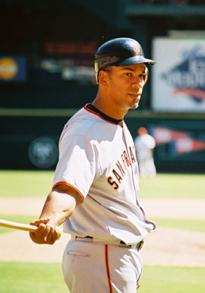
The Marlins' Moisés Alou hit a three-run home run in Game 1.

=== Game 1 ===
October 18, 1997 8:05 pm (EDT) at Pro Player Stadium in Miami Gardens, Florida 74 °F (23 °C), cloudy
Team	1	2	3	4	5	6	7	8	9	R	H	E
Cleveland	1	0	0	0	1	1	0	1	0	4	11	0
Florida	0	0	1	4	2	0	0	0	X	7	7	1
WP: Liván Hernández (1–0) LP: Orel Hershiser (0–1) Sv: Robb Nen (1); Home runs: CLE: Manny Ramírez (1), Jim Thome (1); FLA: Moisés Alou (1), Charles Johnson (1); Attendance: 67,245; Boxscore

The first World Series game in the state of Florida, Game 1 featured a youngster and a veteran facing each other on the mound. Fresh off his NLCS MVP performance, Liván Hernández took the mound for the Marlins and quickly gave up a run in the first thanks to a double by leadoff man Bip Roberts and an RBI single by David Justice. Indian starter Orel Hershiser got by the first two innings unscathed. However, after the Marlins tied the game in the third on Edgar Renteria's RBI groundout with two on, they scored four runs in the fourth. Moisés Alou's three-run home run off the left field foul pole put the Marlins up 4–1 and Charles Johnson followed with a home run to make it 5–1. After Manny Ramírez's home run in the fifth cut the lead to 5–2, Hershiser allowed a one-out walk and single in the bottom of the inning before Jeff Conine's RBI single made it 6–2 Marlins. Jeff Juden relieved Hershiser and after a force-out at second, threw a ball four wild pitch that let Bobby Bonilla score from third. Jim Thome's home run cut the lead to 7–3 in the sixth, then the Indians got another run in the eighth off Jay Powell when Marquis Grissom walked with two outs and scored on Brian Giles's double, but Florida closer Robb Nen came in the ninth and got out of a jam by striking out Sandy Alomar Jr. and Thome with two men aboard.

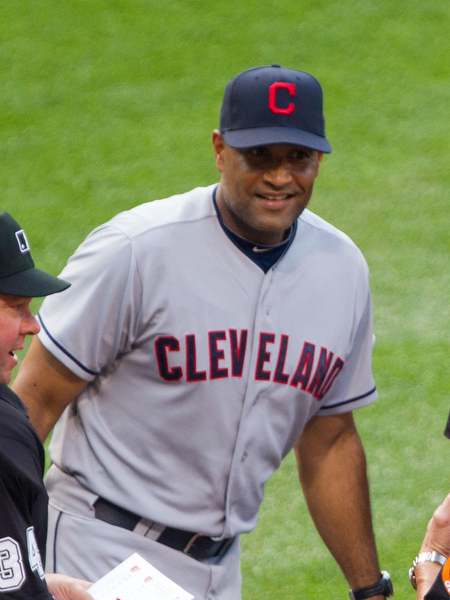
Sandy Alomar Jr. hit a two-run home run for the Indians in Game 2.

=== Game 2 ===
October 19, 1997 7:35 pm (EDT) at Pro Player Stadium in Miami Gardens, Florida 74 °F (23 °C), mostly cloudy
Team	1	2	3	4	5	6	7	8	9	R	H	E
Cleveland	1	0	0	0	3	2	0	0	0	6	14	0
Florida	1	0	0	0	0	0	0	0	0	1	8	0
WP: Chad Ogea (1–0) LP: Kevin Brown (0–1); Home runs: CLE: Sandy Alomar Jr. (1); FLA: None; Attendance: 67,025; Boxscore

Game 2 matched up Florida ace Kevin Brown against Chad Ogea, who had lost two games in the ALCS. Both teams scored in the first, thanks to RBI singles by David Justice for the Indians after Omar Vizquel doubled with one out and Jeff Conine for the Marlins with two on. Ogea barely escaped further damage when Moisés Alou got under a hanging curveball, but merely flied out to the warning track, missing his second three-run homer in as many nights by inches. After that, Ogea settled in and did not allow any more runs in 6 2/3 innings. Brown pitched well until the fifth when the Indians took the lead by stringing together three singles by Matt Williams, Sandy Alomar Jr., and Marquis Grissom. Later in the inning, with runners on second and third, Bip Roberts drove in a pair of runs with a single up the middle giving the Tribe a 4–1 lead. The three-run lead ballooned to five when Alomar hit a laser into the left field stands for a two-run home run in the sixth. The Indians' 6–1 win tied the series heading to Cleveland.

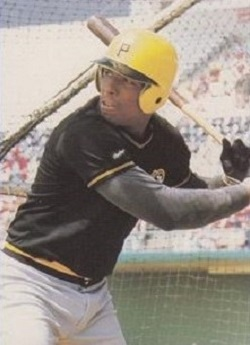
Bobby Bonilla scored the winning run for the Marlins in a wild back-and-forth Game 3.

=== Game 3 ===
October 21, 1997 8:20 pm (EDT) at Jacobs Field in Cleveland, Ohio 46 °F (8 °C), mostly clear
Team	1	2	3	4	5	6	7	8	9	R	H	E
Florida	1	0	1	1	0	2	2	0	7	14	16	3
Cleveland	2	0	0	3	2	0	0	0	4	11	10	3
WP: Dennis Cook (1–0) LP: Eric Plunk (0–1); Home runs: FLA: Gary Sheffield (1), Darren Daulton (1), Jim Eisenreich (1); CLE: Jim Thome (2); Attendance: 44,880; Boxscore

Game 3 was a wild affair that ended with the Marlins grabbing a 2–1 series lead. Charles Nagy of the Indians faced Al Leiter of the Marlins. Both pitchers fared poorly, with Leiter giving up seven runs (four earned) in 4 2/3 innings and Nagy gave up five in six innings. In the top of the first, Gary Sheffield started the scoring with a home run to left. In the bottom half, the Indians retaliated with two runs thanks to two broken bat RBI singles by Matt Williams and Sandy Alomar Jr. Nagy's bases loaded walk to Sheffield tied the game in the third, before Florida took a 3–2 lead in the fourth on Darren Daulton's home run. However, the Indians got a gift in the bottom of the fourth, when they drew four free passes, then a throwing error by third baseman Bobby Bonilla on Manny Ramírez's single allowed two more runs to score. The Tribe went up 7–3 on Jim Thome's two-run home run to right in the fifth inning, which also knocked Leiter out of the game. His home run was nullified in the sixth by Jim Eisenreich's two-run home run that cut the lead to 7–5. In the seventh, Craig Counsell hit a leadoff single off Brian Anderson and moved to second on a groundout, then Édgar Rentería's single and Gary Sheffield's double off Mike Jackson (who was charged with a blown save) each drove in a run, making the score 7–7. In the ninth, Bonilla drew a leadoff walk off reliever Eric Plunk and scored on Daulton's single aided by an error that let Daulton go to third. After a strikeout to Alou (his third of the night) and intentional walk to pinch-hitter Cliff Floyd, an error by first baseman Thome on Plunk's pickoff attempt allowed Daulton to score. After Charles Johnson singled, Alvin Morman relieved Plunk and an error by second baseman Tony Fernández on Counsell's ground ball allowed Floyd to score. After Morman retired Devon White, a walk to Rentería loaded the bases before José Mesa relieved Morman and allowed two-run singles to Sheffield and Bonilla aided by a wild pitch that gave the Marlins at 14–7 lead. In the bottom of the inning, the Indians loaded the bases on a walk and two singles with one out off Robb Nen before Tony Fernández's sacrifice fly and Marquis Grissom's single scored a run each, then Bip Roberts' two-run double cut the lead to 14–11, but Omar Vizquel grounded out to end the game. Dennis Cook got the win in relief by tossing a scoreless eighth and Plunk got the loss. This was the highest scoring World Series game for 20 years until the fifth game of the 2017 World Series between the Houston Astros and the Los Angeles Dodgers; it was also the fourth time a team had scored seven runs in the ninth inning of a postseason game and the first since the 1990 ALCS. Marlins batter Gary Sheffield had five RBIs in the game to lead all batters.

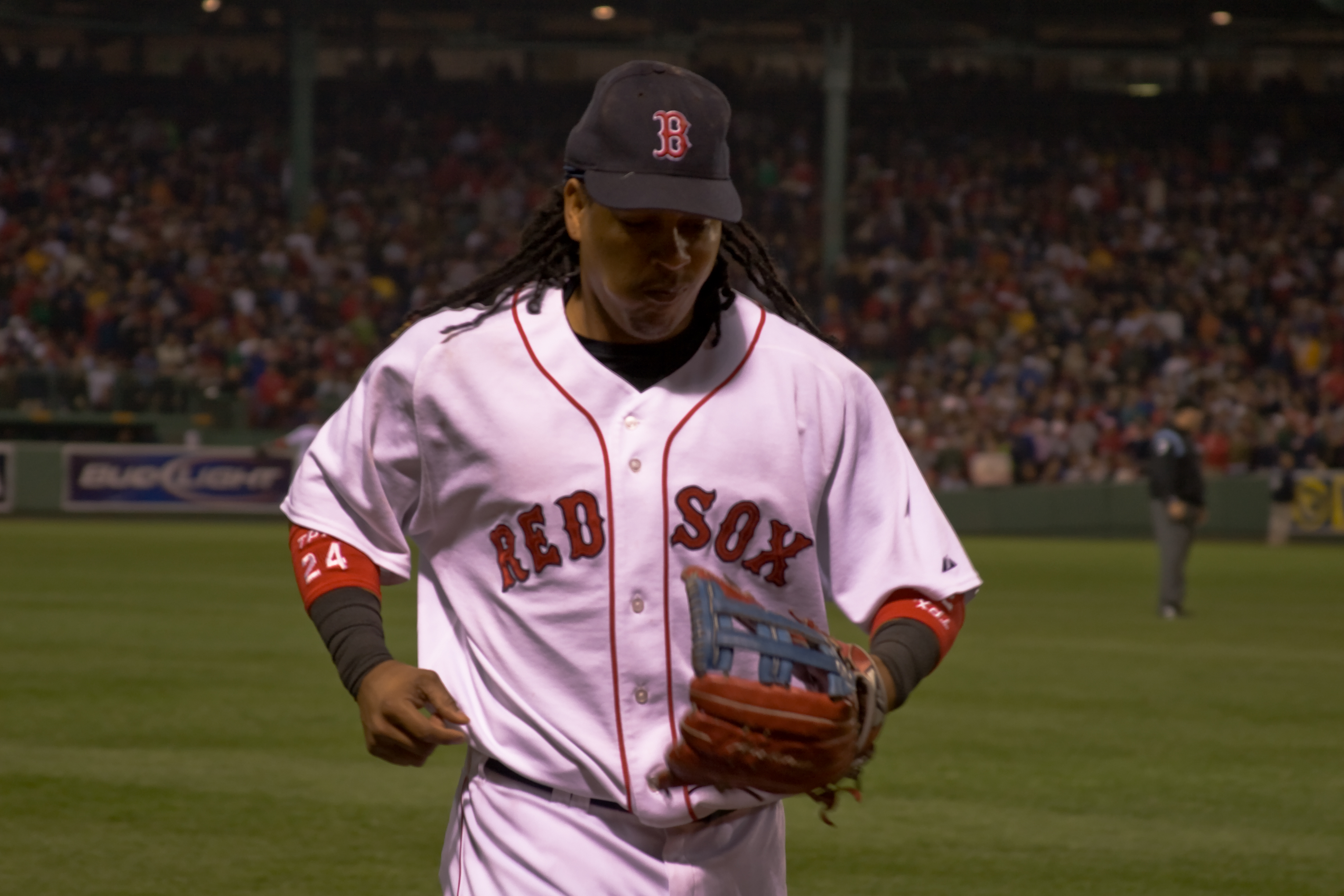
Manny Ramirez hit the go-ahead two-run home run for the Indians in Game 4.

=== Game 4 ===
October 22, 1997 8:20 pm (EDT) at Jacobs Field in Cleveland, Ohio 35 °F (2 °C), snow flurries
Team	1	2	3	4	5	6	7	8	9	R	H	E
Florida	0	0	0	1	0	2	0	0	0	3	6	2
Cleveland	3	0	3	0	0	1	1	2	X	10	15	0
WP: Jaret Wright (1–0) LP: Tony Saunders (0–1) Sv: Brian Anderson (1); Home runs: FLA: Moisés Alou (2); CLE: Manny Ramírez (2), Matt Williams (1); Attendance: 44,887; Boxscore

This back-and-forth World Series continued that way in Game 4. Both teams were greeted by snow during batting practice and freezing temperatures throughout this contest. The official gametime temperature of 35 °F (3.3 °C) remains as of 2026 the coldest recorded in World Series history. As the game progressed, media outlets reported wind chill readings as low as 18 °F (−7.8 °C). Two rookies opposed each other on the mound, Jaret Wright for the Indians and Tony Saunders for the Marlins. In the bottom of the first, Omar Vizquel singled with one out before Manny Ramírez's two-run home run put the Indians up 2–0. Matt Williams then singled with two outs and scored on Sandy Alomar's double. In the third, Ramírez drew a leadoff walk, moved to second on an error and scored on David Justice's single. After another walk, Alomar's single scored Justice. After a third walk loaded the bases, Antonio Alfonseca relived Saunders and allowed an RBI single to Tony Fernández. The Marlins got on the board in the fourth on Jim Eisenreich's RBI single with two on, then Moisés Alou's two-run home run after a walk in the sixth cut the Indians' lead to 6–3, but that was as close as the Marlins got. In the bottom of the inning, Alomar's bases-loaded groundout off Ed Vosberg made it 7–3 Indians. Next inning, Fernández hit a leadoff single, moved to second on a ground out and scored on Brian Giles's single. In the eighth, Williams' two-run home run after a walk capped the game's scoring at 10–3 as the Indians tied the series at two games apiece which guaranteed a return to Florida. Wright allowed three runs in six sharp innings and Brian Anderson wrapped up Wright's win with a three-inning save.

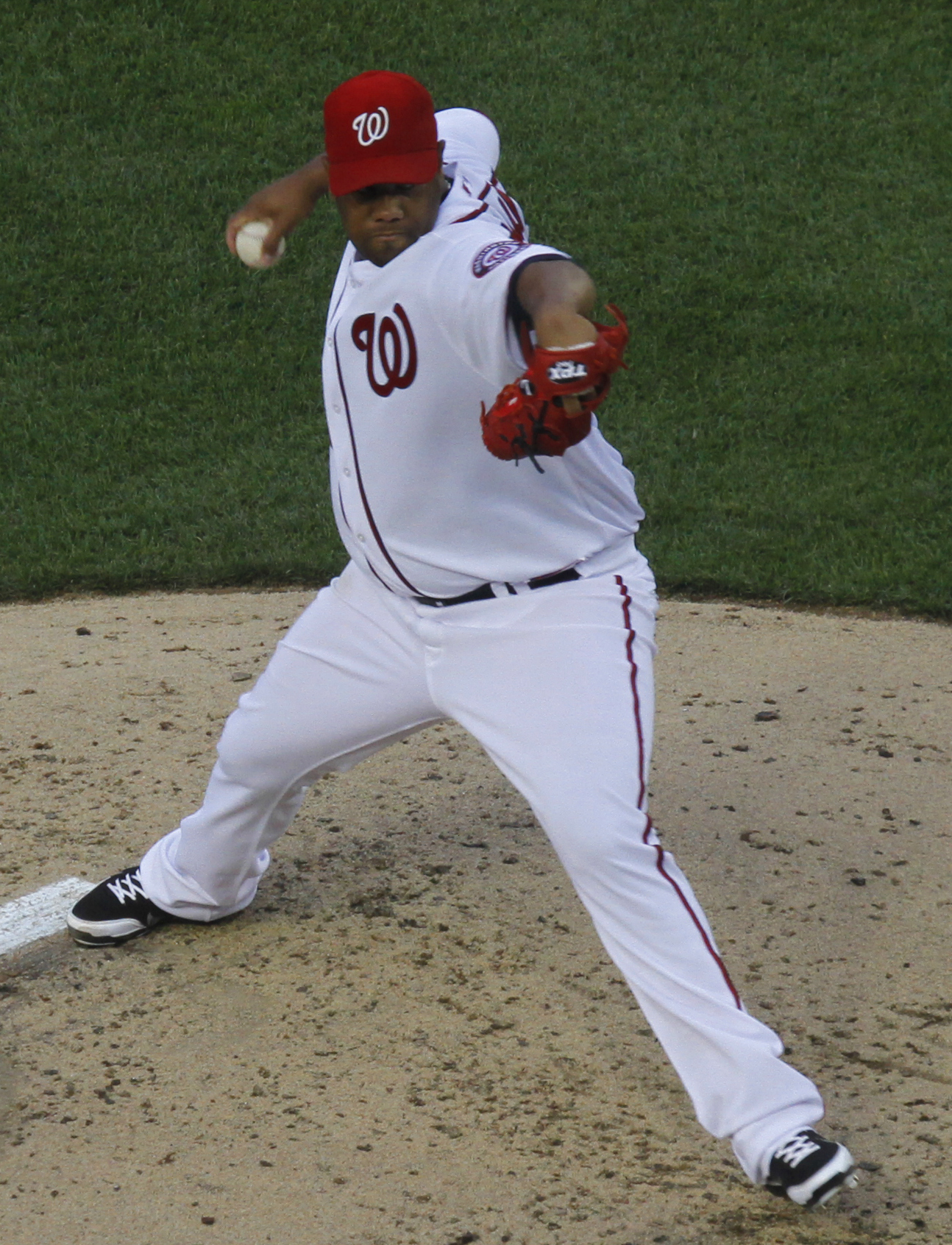
Liván Hernández was the starting and winning pitcher in Game 5.

=== Game 5 ===
October 23, 1997 8:20 pm (EDT) at Jacobs Field in Cleveland, Ohio 43 °F (6 °C), overcast
Team	1	2	3	4	5	6	7	8	9	R	H	E
Florida	0	2	0	0	0	4	0	1	1	8	15	2
Cleveland	0	1	3	0	0	0	0	0	3	7	9	0
WP: Liván Hernández (2–0) LP: Orel Hershiser (0–2) Sv: Robb Nen (2); Home runs: FLA: Moisés Alou (3); CLE: Sandy Alomar Jr. (2); Attendance: 44,888; Boxscore

Game 5 was a rematch of Game 1's starting pitchers Liván Hernández and Orel Hershiser. The Marlins struck first when Darren Daulton hit a ground-rule double and scored on Charles Johnson's single. After a walk to Craig Counsell, Devon White's RBI double made it 2–0 Marlins. The Indians cut it to 2–1 in the bottom of the inning when Jim Thome tripled and scored on Sandy Alomar's single. Next inning, Alomar launched a towering three-run home run after two walks to Thome and Matt Williams to put the Indians up 4–2. In the sixth, Moisés Alou hit his second three-run home run off Hershiser in as many games and his third home run of the Series to put the Marlins up 5–4. Eric Plunk then walked Craig Counsell with the bases loaded to force in Jeff Conine, with the run charged to Hershiser. The Marlins added to their lead in the seventh when Alou hit a leadoff single off Jeff Juden, stole second, moved to third on a groundout, and scored on Johnson's single. Next inning, Alou's single scored pinch-runner Alex Arias (running for Bonilla) with two on off José Mesa extended the lead to 8–4. Livan pitched terrifically in the middle innings, not allowing any runs until the ninth. An error and single put two on with no outs for the Indians. Robb Nen in relief allowed a two-run single to David Justice (both of the runs charged to Hernández), then a two-out RBI single to Thome before Alomar flew out to right to end the game and give the Marlins a 3–2 series lead heading back to Florida.

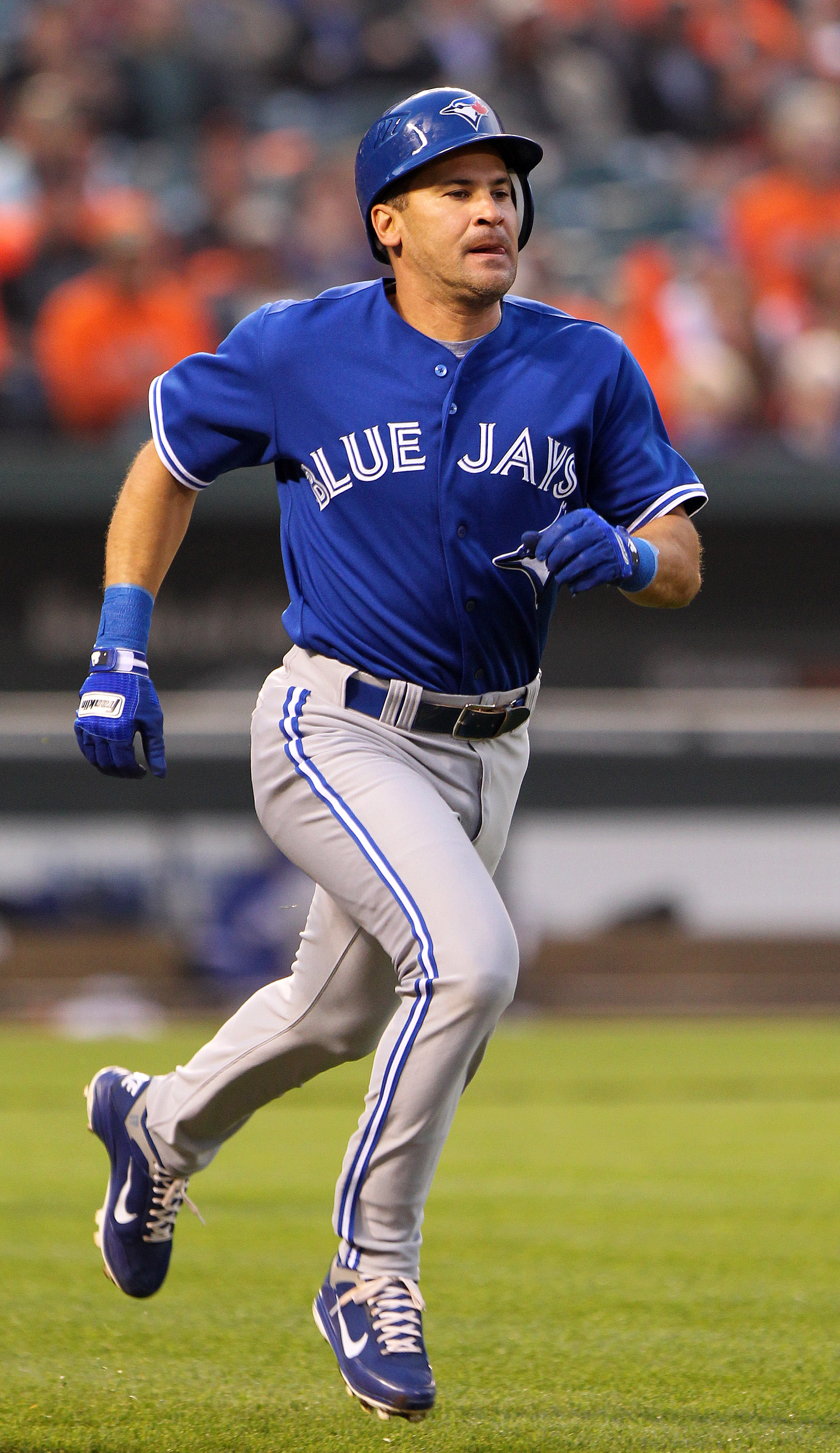
Omar Vizquel logged the game-sealing putout on Charles Johnson in the sixth inning.

=== Game 6 ===
October 25, 1997 8:00 pm (EDT) at Pro Player Stadium in Miami Gardens, Florida 79 °F (26 °C), mostly cloudy
Team	1	2	3	4	5	6	7	8	9	R	H	E
Cleveland	0	2	1	0	1	0	0	0	0	4	7	0
Florida	0	0	0	0	1	0	0	0	0	1	8	0
WP: Chad Ogea (2–0) LP: Kevin Brown (0–2) Sv: José Mesa (1); Attendance: 67,498; Boxscore

Game 6's attendance of 67,498 was the highest single-game attendance for the World Series since Game 5 of the 1959 World Series, when 92,706 people filled the football-oriented Los Angeles Memorial Coliseum. The Series returned to the warmer climate of Miami for Game 6. Kevin Brown opposed Chad Ogea again and again Brown inexplicably struggled while Ogea flourished. Chad himself drove in the first two runs with a bases-loaded single in the second, and Manny Ramírez hit a sacrifice fly in the third (after Omar Vizquel hit a leadoff double and stole third) and the fifth (after a leadoff double and subsequent single). Darren Daulton's sacrifice fly with two on in the fifth that scored Moisés Alou from third gave the Marlins their only run of the game. With the Tribe leading 4–1 in the sixth, Ogea ran into serious trouble. The Marlins put runners on second and third with two out as reliever Mike Jackson replaced Ogea. Marlins catcher Charles Johnson stepped to the plate and proceeded to hit a sharp grounder that was headed for left field and looked like a base hit. Indians shortstop Omar Vizquel, who won the Gold Glove that year, dove for the ball, grabbed it, sprung to his feet, and hurled a perfect strike to first base just before Johnson arrived. The play ended the threat and broke the Marlins' spirits. In the ninth, closer José Mesa wrapped up the win despite allowing a triple to Devon White to tie the Series at 3–3. This was the last playoff game won by Cleveland when facing elimination until Game 4 of the 2024 American League Division Series.

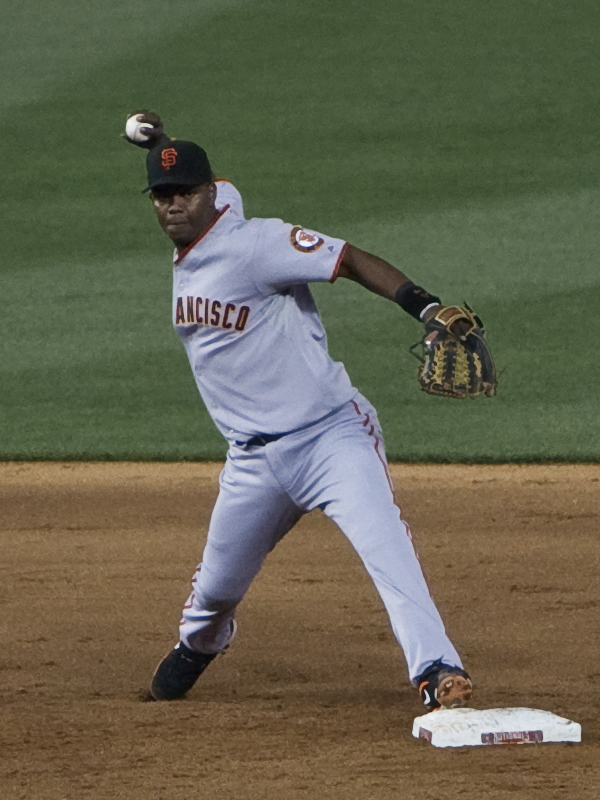
Édgar Rentería hit the game and series-winning single for the Marlins in the eleventh inning of Game 7.

=== Game 7 ===
October 26, 1997 7:35 pm (EST) at Pro Player Stadium in Miami Gardens, Florida 80 °F (27 °C), partly cloudy
Team	1	2	3	4	5	6	7	8	9	10	11	R	H	E
Cleveland	0	0	2	0	0	0	0	0	0	0	0	2	6	2
Florida	0	0	0	0	0	0	1	0	1	0	1	3	8	0
WP: Jay Powell (1–0) LP: Charles Nagy (0–1); Home runs: CLE: None; FLA: Bobby Bonilla (1); Attendance: 67,204; Boxscore

For the decisive final matchup of the World Series, the first time since 1991 that a Game 7 would be played, the Marlins sent Al Leiter to the mound to start. Leiter had been the starter for the Marlins in the high-scoring Game 3 in Cleveland, where he gave up a total of seven runs and did not make it out of the fifth inning, but was spared a potential loss when the Marlins rallied to win.

For the Indians, their ace pitcher Charles Nagy was next up in the rotation. Meanwhile, rookie standout Jaret Wright was available on short rest if manager Mike Hargrove so desired to use him. Nagy had been struggling in the postseason, as he was winless in three starts, and had already faced Leiter in Game 3 where he gave up three home runs to the Marlins. Wright, however, had yet to lose in the postseason, entering with three wins in four starts including his Game 4 win in this series; he had also started, and won, the Indians' Division Series clincher against the Yankees. Hargrove elected to start Wright over Nagy.

The Marlins managed one hit in the 1st inning, a double off the bat of Édgar Rentería. That was the only hit Wright gave up through six innings, and the Indians staked him to a 2–0 lead in the third. With nobody out, Jim Thome walked and Marquis Grissom singled him to second. After Wright bunted the runners into scoring position, Leiter struck out Omar Vizquel for the second out. The next batter, Tony Fernández, singled to drive both runners in.

The Indians threatened again in the fifth inning, as Vizquel singled with one out. He stole second while Fernandez batted, putting himself in scoring position. Leiter struck Fernandez out, then gave an intentional walk to Manny Ramirez to put two runners on. Vizquel then managed to steal third base, but Leiter struck out David Justice to end the inning. He would leave the game after retiring the Indians in order in the sixth.

Meanwhile, not only had Wright allowed a single hit through six innings, but he had also managed to keep the Marlins off of the bases. Entering the seventh inning, he had only allowed a total of four baserunners; in addition to the Rentería double, he had walked Gary Sheffield in the first and Leiter in the fifth, and Darren Daulton had reached on a three-base error when Ramirez misplayed a line drive.

The Marlins finally broke through in the bottom of the seventh as Bobby Bonilla hit Wright's first pitch over the right-center field wall for a home run to cut the lead to 2–1. After striking out Charles Johnson and walking Craig Counsell, Wright was removed from the game in favor of Paul Assenmacher who was scheduled to pitch to Cliff Floyd. Marlins manager Jim Leyland elected to send Kurt Abbott to the plate after the pitching change; Assenmacher retired him on a fly ball, then got Devon White swinging to end the inning.

In the top of the ninth inning, Cleveland again threatened. After Antonio Alfonseca walked Matt Williams to lead off the inning and Sandy Alomar Jr. reached on a fielder's choice to take Williams off the bases, Félix Heredia gave up a single to Thome which advanced Alomar to third. He was then pulled in favor of closer Robb Nen. Nen induced a groundball from Grissom to Rentería at shortstop, who elected to throw Alomar out at home, thanks in part to a great pick and tag by Johnson. He then got Brian Giles to fly out to end the inning.

The Indians sent closer José Mesa to the mound to try to win the series in the bottom of the ninth inning. Moisés Alou led off with a single, and Bonilla struck out swinging on a 3–2 pitch. Johnson then followed with a single to advance Alou to third, bringing Counsell to the plate. On a 1-1 pitch, Counsell hit a deep fly ball to right field that just missed being a home run, but was caught by Ramirez at the wall. Alou was able to score from third standing up, which tied the game. Mesa managed to get out of the inning by retiring Jim Eisenreich.

Nen struck out the side in the top of the 10th inning. In the bottom of the frame, Mesa gave up back-to-back one-out singles, and after striking out John Cangelosi looking on a 3-2 pitch, Hargrove elected to finally use his ace starter and brought Nagy into the game to face Alou, who flied out to end the inning. After walking Williams, leading off the top of the 11th inning, Jay Powell retired Cleveland in order thanks to an alert fielder's choice on a sacrifice bunt by Alomar, which Powell fielded and threw out the lead runner at 2nd, followed by a Jim Thome inning-ending double play.

Bonilla led off the bottom off the eleventh by singling to center. Gregg Zaun, who replaced Johnson after pinch running for him in the bottom the ninth, stepped in for his first at bat and was asked to bunt Bonilla over. Zaun popped the ball up on the bunt attempt, however, and Bonilla barely beat Nagy's throw back to first to try to double him off.

Counsell followed with a slow ground ball to the second base side. Bonilla momentarily stopped running as the ball rolled toward him, so as not to be called out for interference if the ball touched him. Fernandez, who was playing on the edge of the infield dirt, was distracted enough by Bonilla that he could not see the ball right away and thus could not play it cleanly, allowing Counsell to reach base on the error.

Hargrove then called for an intentional walk to Eisenreich to load the bases for White, then pulled the infield in instead of playing for an inning-ending double play as, if the speedy White hit a ground ball, it would have been easier to throw out the much slower Bonilla on a force play at the plate. The play unfolded exactly as described, as White grounded to second and Fernandez threw home for the force, getting the second out and preventing the winning run from scoring although the bases were once again loaded.

Up stepped Rentería, as Nagy now had a chance to get out of the jam and extend the game by recording one more out. Rentería, behind 0–1, hit a hard line drive back up the middle. Nagy tried to field the ball, but it hit off of his glove and went into center field. Counsell scored the series winning run, then leaped into the air in celebration.

After Game 7, the trophy presentation, usually taking place in the winning team's locker room regardless of venue, took place on the field for the first time ever before the crowd of 67,204. It was presided over by then-Chairman of the Executive Committee Bud Selig, who first did the honors in 1995 and would officially become Commissioner of Baseball in 1998. This is now a standard procedure whenever the champions are the home team of the deciding game (the only exception being 1999, when the New York Yankees chose to celebrate in their locker room, likely due to the controversy involving Yankees outfielder Chad Curtis and NBC Sports reporter Jim Gray during an interview following Game 3). However, this would not become a regular practice until 2001 as the next three World Series (1998, 1999, and 2000) had the trophy presentation in the winning teams clubhouse.

It was the first time since 1962 that the two teams alternated wins throughout the World Series.

Liván Hernández was named the Most Valuable Player of the 1997 World Series. Chad Ogea became the first pitcher since Mickey Lolich in 1968 to have at least two hits and two RBIs in a World Series. The Marlins won despite not having Alex Fernandez, their number-two starter, who did not pitch due to a rotator cuff injury.

== Composite box ==
1997 World Series (4–3): Florida Marlins (N.L.) beat Cleveland Indians (A.L.)

Team	1	2	3	4	5	6	7	8	9	10	11	R	H	E
Florida Marlins	2	2	2	6	3	8	3	1	9	0	1	37	68	8
Cleveland Indians	7	3	9	3	7	4	1	3	7	0	0	44	72	5
Total attendance: 403,627 Average attendance: 57,661; Winning player's share: $188,468 Losing player's share: $113,226

== Aftermath ==
In only their fifth season of existence, the Marlins were the quickest expansion team to reach (and win) the World Series until 2001, when the Arizona Diamondbacks did it in their fourth year. Coincidentally, both World Series ended with a game-winning RBI single with Craig Counsell being on the basepath for each.

On October 31, 1997, most of the key contributors of the 1997 Marlins were traded, including Moisés Alou, who was sent to the Houston Astros, and Al Leiter to the New York Mets, in a fire sale so infamous that it has come to synonymize the term in the baseball world. The Marlins also lost Jeff Conine to the Kansas City Royals in free agency and Darren Daulton who retired. World Series MVP hurler Liván Hernández, however, stayed with the team for two more years. The Marlins finished 54–108 in 1998, the worst performance ever by a defending World Series champion. As a result, these Marlins are mockingly referred to as the first "Rent-A-Team" to win the World Series. Midway through the 1998 season, the Marlins would trade Jim Eisenreich, Bobby Bonilla, Gary Sheffield, and Charles Johnson to the Los Angeles Dodgers for Todd Zeile and Mike Piazza. Piazza would be traded shortly after to the Mets in return for prospects, one of which was Preston Wilson.

Jim Leyland, responding to reports that he would retire if the Marlins won the World Series, told NBC during the celebration, "My wife doesn't like me that much. I can't retire." However, he resigned in the wake of their awful performance in 1998. He managed the Colorado Rockies in 1999, then scouted for several years before joining the Detroit Tigers as manager in 2006. Leyland led the Tigers to World Series appearances in 2006 and 2012. Leyland was hired as Tigers manager by Dave Dombrowski, the architect of the 1997 Marlins. Dombrowski would later build another World Series-winning team, the 2018 Boston Red Sox, and also oversaw a World Series appearance from the 2022 Philadelphia Phillies.

Marlins owner H. Wayne Huizenga, who dodged questions about selling the team during the on-field celebration, ultimately sold the team to John W. Henry after the 1998 season. Henry in turn sold it to former Montreal Expos owner Jeffrey Loria in 2001 as part of a deal to purchase the Boston Red Sox. Loria would return the team to a World Series victory in 2003. That season started with only one of the 1997 World Series players left on the roster: pitcher Rick Helling. Helling was traded mid-season to the Texas Rangers. However, the team traded with the Baltimore Orioles for Jeff Conine. Conine would be the only 1997 Marlin to participate in the 2003 World Series victory. The 1997 and 2003 seasons marked the Marlins' only trips to the postseason until 2020, when the Marlins lost the NLDS to the Atlanta Braves.

The failure of José Mesa to save Game 7 ultimately ignited a heated feud with teammate Omar Vizquel. In Vizquel's autobiography, the veteran shortstop called Mesa a "choker." The two men ended their longtime friendship. Mesa later vowed to "...hit him every time" he faced him, and also stated that he wanted to kill Vizquel. Though Mesa did not actually bean Vizquel every time he subsequently faced him, he did hit him with pitches at least twice.

The Indians would go on to win the AL Central three of the following four years, returning to the ALCS the following season. However, they were defeated in six games by the record-setting New York Yankees. They would not advance to another World Series until 2016, where they gave up a 3–1 series lead and allowed the Chicago Cubs to win their first World Series in 108 years. Coincidentally, the Indians suffered a Game 7 defeat in extra-innings, just like the 1997 team.

The core of the 1990s Indians teams would break up in the early 2000s, most notably with Manny Ramirez joining the Boston Red Sox in 2001 and Jim Thome joining the Philadelphia Phillies in 2003. The 1997 Indians failed to end the Cleveland sports curse, which stood at 33 years since the 1964 Cleveland Browns won the city's most recent championship. The Curse would eventually end in 2016, when the Cleveland Cavaliers won the NBA Title, giving the city its first major sports title in 52 years.

The total attendance of 403,627 fans is the second-largest in World Series history. The high attendance is due to the fact that the series went the full seven games and the large seating capacity at Pro Player Stadium. All four games played in Miami had over 67,000 in attendance. This Series only trails the 1959 World Series, which drew 420,784 spectators. That Series had three of its six games played at the Los Angeles Memorial Coliseum and drew over 92,000 for each game played at the Coliseum.

Edgar Rentería, the player who drove in the winning run to win the World Series for the Marlins, would win a World Series MVP 13 years later as a member of the San Francisco Giants.

== Radio and television coverage ==
NBC, as per the terms of the then-current broadcasting contract, televised the World Series nationally. It was the first World Series telecast to air exclusively on NBC since 1988; they were originally scheduled to air the 1995 World Series alone as part of its joint venture with ABC and Major League Baseball dubbed The Baseball Network, but the 1994 strike cancelled that year's World Series and NBC and ABC ultimately alternated coverage of the 1995 World Series. Bob Costas led the broadcast, with Bob Uecker and Joe Morgan as analysts. Hannah Storm and Keith Olbermann hosted the pregame show, with Olbermann and Jim Gray serving as field reporters for the respective teams. Storm and Gray presided over the on-field celebration after Game 7.

CBS Radio, which had covered the World Series consecutively since 1976, did so for the final time in 1997. The national radio broadcasting rights would move over to ESPN the following season. Vin Scully, in what would prove to be his last World Series call before he retired in 2016, was the lead broadcaster for the eleventh time for CBS. Jeff Torborg joined Scully as analyst, making his third and final appearance. John Rooney hosted the studio segments for the series for the eleventh consecutive World Series.

This was the last World Series for Indians Radio Network announcer Herb Score, as he retired at season's end. Score's broadcast partner, Tom Hamilton, would take over as lead announcer and he remains in that position as of the 2024 season. It also marked the final game carried by Indians flagship station WKNR (1220); the broadcast rights would be moved to WTAM for the 1998 season.

== See also ==
- Cleveland sports curse
- Curse of Rocky Colavito
- 1997 Japan Series
- Golden pitch
