= Estadio Once de Noviembre =

Baseball stadium in Cartagena de Indias, Colombia

Coordinates: 10.404187°N 75.495334°W

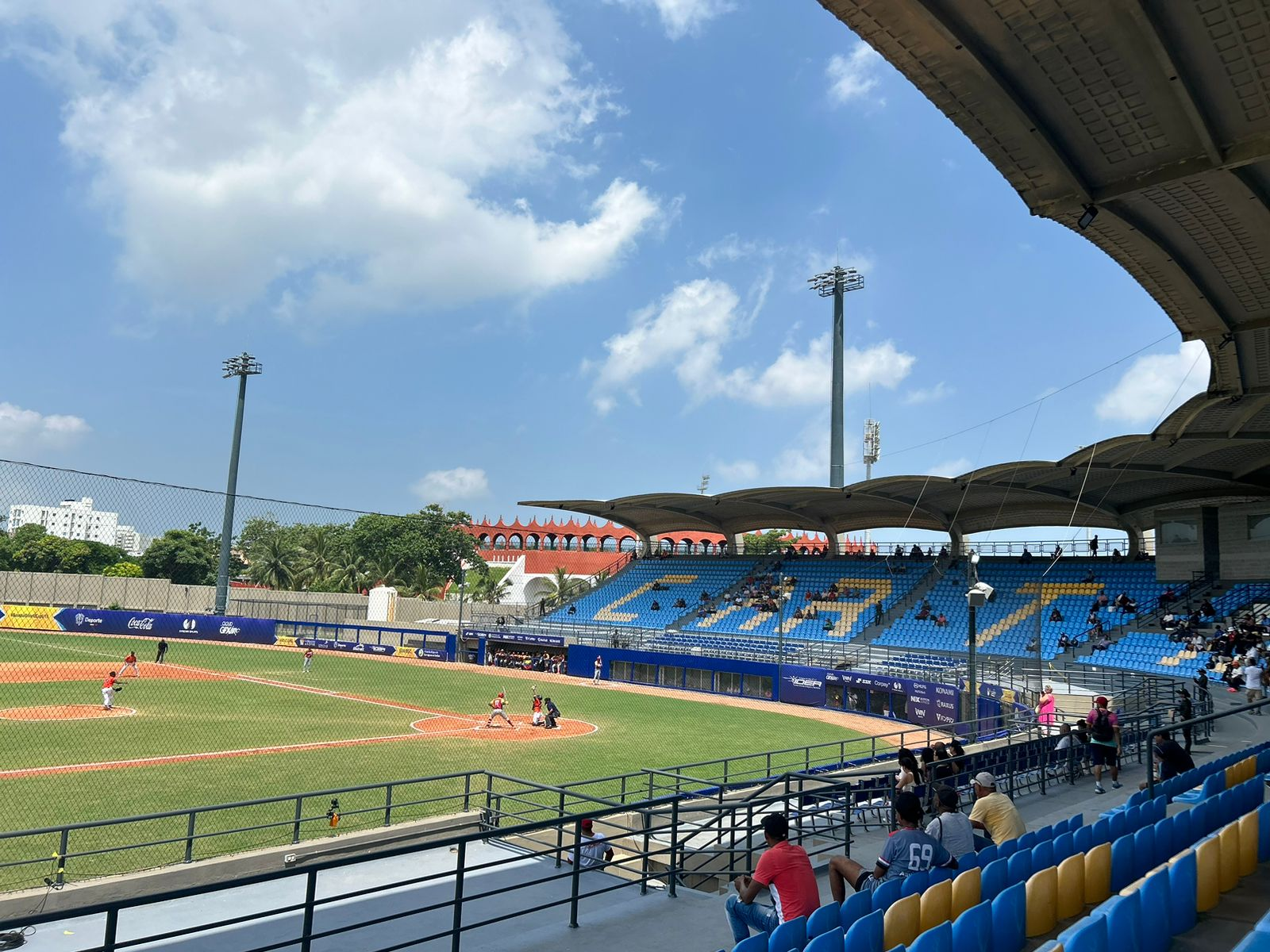
- Interactive map of Estadio Once de Noviembre
- Location: Cartagena de Indias, Colombia
- Owner: Distrito de Cartagena
- Operator: Instituto Distrital de Deportes y Recreación de Cartagena de Indias - IDER.
- Capacity: 12,500

Construction
- Built: 1947
- Opened: 1947

Tenant
- Tigres de Cartagena

Estadio Once de Noviembre Abel Leal Díaz is a baseball stadium in Cartagena de Indias, Colombia. It currently serves as the home of the Tigres de Cartagena of Colombia's professional baseball league. The stadium has a seating capacity of 12,500 people.

The stadium hosted the Amateur World Series tournaments of 1947, 1965, and 1970, as well as the 2006 Central American and Caribbean Games. In 2019, the stadium was renamed in honor of Abel Leal Díaz, nicknamed "El Tigre," who played in Colombia's amateur circuit in the 1960s and '70s.

The condition of the stadium has deteriorated in recent years, forcing Tigres to play their 2023–24 season at the Estadio Édgar Rentería in Barranquilla.

== Design ==
According to American architectural historian Henry-Russell Hitchcock, this is one of the most striking examples in the world of cantilevered shell vaulting. The team of architects (including Alvaro Ortega, Gabriel Solano, Jorge Gaitan Cortes, and Edgar Burbano) collaborated with an extraordinary designer of structures, the engineer Guillermo Gonzalez Zuleta. A pivotal project of the mid-century modernization in Colombia that brought on new construction techniques and design philosophies, Hitchcock wrote that the stadium synthesized a special moment for architecture and engineering in Colombia.

The stadium won the National Engineering Prize (1947). The main grandstand is of particular interest as it was the first reinforced concrete roof in Colombia.

In plan view, this grandstand is L-shaped, forming a right angle behind home plate. In profile, the main grandstand and roof are supported by robust structural elements forming a C-shape (ribs), resting on two rows of columns. There are eight of these elements in total (this ribbed system was later replicated by González Zuleta at the Techo racetrack and other sports venues). The roof cantilevers 20 meters. It is composed of thin vaults made of reinforced concrete with steel. Their arched shape allows for the utilization of the concrete's compressive strength, while the steel makes them thin yet strong. These vaults rest on the ribs.
