= Manuel Ramírez Gómez =

Colombian economist

Manuel Ramírez Gómez (September 13, 1942-2014) was a Colombian economist specializing in applied microeconomics. He was the director of the research center at the Economics Department in Universidad del Rosario. He was director of economic research at Econometria Ltda., president of Academia Colombiana de Ciencias Económicas, and co-founder of Asociación Colombiana de Economía de la Salud.

== See more ==
- Website at Universidad del Rosario
