= Kurt Abbott =

American baseball player (born 1969)

- Shortstop / Second baseman
- Born: June 2, 1969 (age 56); Zanesville, Ohio, U.S.
- Batted: Right Threw: Right

MLB debut
- September 8, 1993, for the Oakland Athletics

Last MLB appearance
- April 13, 2001, for the Atlanta Braves

MLB statistics
- Batting average: .256
- Home runs: 62
- Runs batted in: 242
- Stats at Baseball Reference

Teams
- Oakland Athletics (1993); Florida Marlins (1994–1997); Oakland Athletics (1998); Colorado Rockies (1998–1999); New York Mets (2000); Atlanta Braves (2001)

Career highlights and awards
- World Series champion (1997)

Kurt Thomas Abbott (born June 2, 1969) is an American former professional baseball player who played in Major League Baseball (MLB) primarily as a shortstop and second baseman from 1993 to 2001.

== Career ==
Abbott was born in Zanesville, Ohio and graduated from Dixie M. Hollins High School in St. Petersburg, Florida. He played collegiately at St. Petersburg Junior College. Abbott was drafted by the Oakland Athletics in the 15th round of the 1989 Major League Baseball draft. He played Minor League Baseball in the Athletics' farm system between 1989 and 1993, for the Southern Oregon A's, Arizona League Athletics, Madison Muskies, Huntsville Stars, Modesto A's, and Tacoma Tigers.

Abbott broke into the major leagues on September 7, 1993, as a member of the Athletics in an 11–7 win over the Blue Jays. Abbott was called upon in the top of the 10th inning to run for Dave Henderson after Henderson singled off Mike Timlin. He was retired when Rubén Sierra grounded into a double play and was replaced in the field by Scott Lydy in the bottom of the 10th inning. Abbott saw action in 24 games for the Athletics that fall, and was traded to the Florida Marlins after the season in exchange for Kerwin Moore.

It was with the Marlins that Abbott spent the majority of his career, staying with them until 1998, primarily as a shortstop. He drove in six runs in an 11–2 victory over the Astros on July 17, 1996, missing the cycle by only a double. He was a member of the 1997 team that won the World Series, appearing in three games as a pinch hitter but failing to get a hit. He w traded back to the Athletics after the season for Eric Ludwick. He did not stay long in his second tour of duty, appearing in only 35 games before being traded to the Colorado Rockies on June 9 for a player to be named later. Abbott proved a valuable utilityman, playing all infield and outfield positions in his time with the team. He became a free agent after the 1999 season and signed a one-year contract with the New York Mets for the 2000 season.

Abbott appeared in 79 games for the Mets in 2000, primarily as a shortstop but also seeing time at second base. He was ejected for the only time in his career on June 9, arguing a play at first base in the top of the 2nd inning. He was granted free agency after the season and signed a one-year contract with the Atlanta Braves.

Abbott appear in only six games for the Braves in 2001, playing the final game of his career on April 13, a win over the Phillies. Pinch-hitting for Mike Remlinger, he reached base on an error and stole second base, but was thrown out trying to score by the Phillies' Doug Glanville to end the inning. Abbott was granted free agency after the season, and lingered in the minor leagues until 2003, playing his final 21 games for the Memphis Redbirds.

== Personal life ==
Abbott is married to Candice Abbott. Together they have four children. Abbott and his wife reside in Stuart, Florida. Abbott retired as a Sheriff's Deputy in 2012 and is currently employed with Masco Coatings, Inc.
