= Rafael Cruz (2000s pitcher) =

Dominican baseball player

- Pitcher
- Born: May 19, 1977 (age 48); Santiago de los Caballeros
- Batted: Right Threw: Right

NPB debut
- June 27, 2007, for the Chunichi Dragons

Last NPB appearance
- October 7, 2007, for the Chunichi Dragons

NPB statistics
- Win–loss record: 1–3
- Earned run average: 2.66
- Strikeouts: 18
- Stats at Baseball Reference

Teams
- Chunichi Dragons (2007)
Medals
Men's baseball
Representing Dominican Republic
Central American and Caribbean Games
| Silver medal – second place | 2006 Cartagena | Team |

Rafael Cruz (born May 19, 1977) is a Dominican Republic former professional baseball player. He played in 2007 for the Chunichi Dragons of Nippon Professional Baseball (NPB).

In 2009, while playing in Minor League Baseball, he was suspended for 50 games for using stanozolol, a performance-enhancing drug.
