= Antonio Torres (baseball) =

Colombian baseball manager

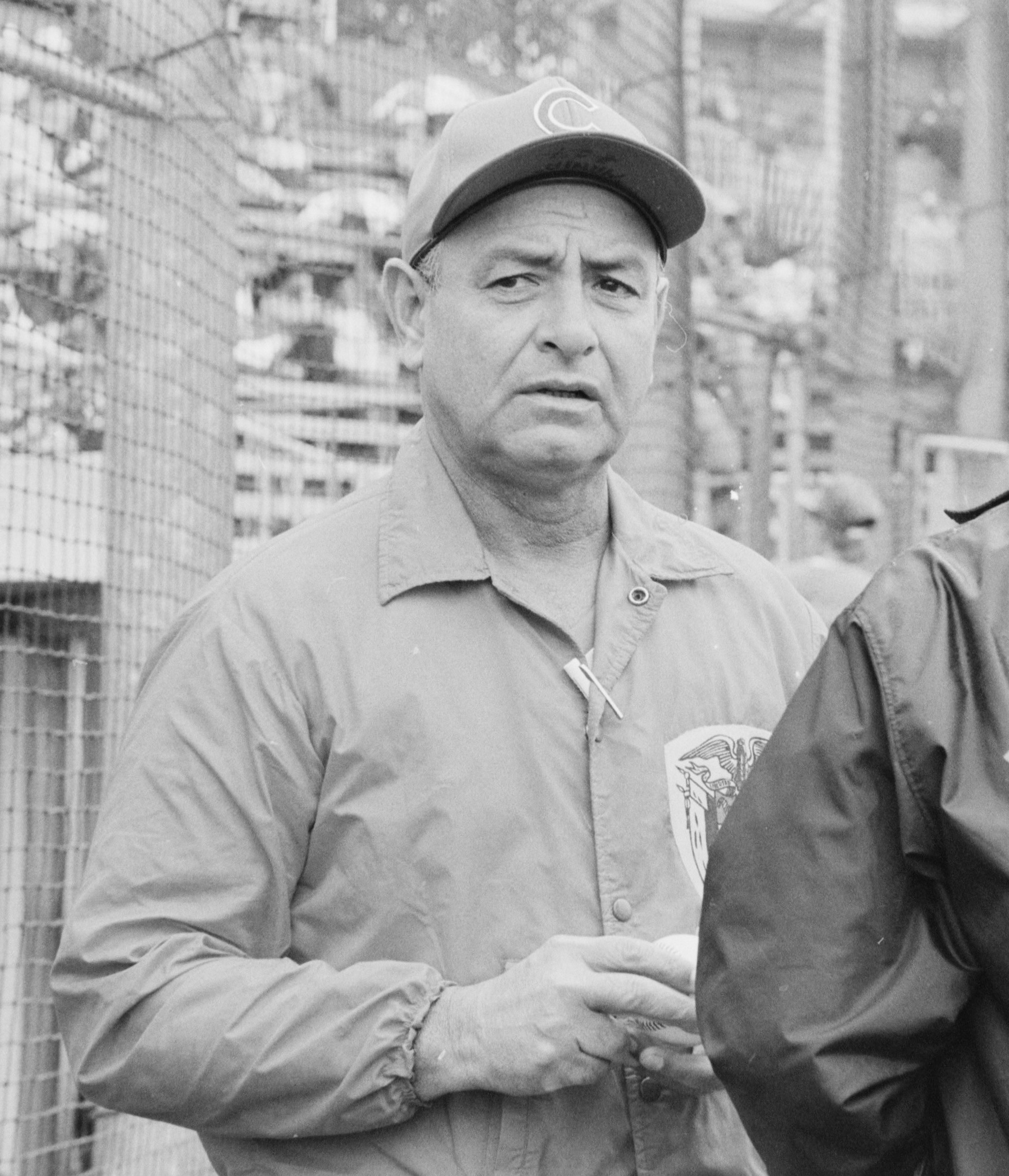
- Outfielder / Manager
- Born: August 18, 1931; Cartagena, Colombia
- Died: December 16, 2023 (aged 92); Cartagena, Colombia
- Batted: Unknown Threw: Unknown
- Stats at Baseball Reference
Medals
Men's baseball
Representing Colombia
Amateur World Series
Bronze medal – third place	1948 Managua	Team
Manager for Colombia
Amateur World Series
Silver medal – second place	1971 Havana	Team
Pan American Games
Bronze medal – third place	1971 Cali	Team
Bolivarian Games
Gold medal – first place	1973 Panama City	Team

Antonio Eduardo Torres López (August 18, 1931 – December 16, 2023), nicknamed "Manía," was a Colombian professional baseball player and coach. He managed the Colombia national baseball team in several international tournaments in the 1970s.

== Playing career ==
Born in Cartagena, Torres grew up idolizing the exploits of pitcher Carlos "Petaca" Rodríguez, earning his nickname from imitating Petaca's facial expressions on the mound. As a teen, he played with the Cundinamarca team in the Colombian amateur championship. Pelayo Chacón selected him as part of the Colombia national baseball team that played at the 1948 Amateur World Series, held in Nicaragua; the team earned the bronze medal after a hard-fought win against Mexico. He also played with the national team at the 1950 Amateur World Series (also in Nicaragua) and at the 1951 Pan American Games in Buenos Aires.

Torres became one of the first Colombian players to sign with an organized baseball team, joining the Baltimore Orioles organization. He played with the Marion Marauders during the 1954 season, but was released by the Orioles after the Tar Heel League abruptly folded later that year.

In the Colombian Professional Baseball League, Torres played two seasons with the Indios de Cartagena, before being traded to Vanytor de Barranquilla in 1950. With Vanytor, he participated in the 1958 Pan American Series, an international club tournament against the Leones de León of Nicaragua and Venados de Mazatlán of Mexico; he took on managerial duties for Vanytor after manager Ted Narleski returned to the United States. He also managed Cinco Estrellas de Granada in the 1957 Nicaraguan Professional Baseball League.

== Managerial career ==
"Manía" Torres managed of the Colombia national team in appearances at eight Amateur World Series, two Pan American Games tournaments, two Bolivarian Games, and several minor tournaments and exhibitions. The "Sons of Mania" team won gold at the 1973 Bolivarian Games, earning Colombia its first gold medal in a competition traditionally dominated by Venezuela. He also collected three silver medals and three bronze medals.

He also managed the Bolívar Department team in Colombia's amateur championships, steering the team to 12 national titles.

After his coaching career, he became a recruiter for foreign players to come play in the Colombian leagues.

== Later life ==
Torres retired from baseball at age 65, and instead entered politics, as part of a group aligned with Álvaro Gómez Hurtado. He died on December 16, 2023, at his residence in Alto Bosque, Cartagena, after three years of battling coronary disease. Following his death, he was honored with an award by the Colombian Olympic Committee for his contributions to baseball in the country.
