= Manuel Ramírez (baseball) =

Venezuelan baseball player (born 1982)

Medal record

Men's baseball

Representing Venezuela
Bronze medal – third place	2006 Cartagena	Team

Manuel Jesus Ramirez Noguera (born September 7, 1982) is a Venezuelan baseball player who has played for the Venezuela national baseball team and professionally in the Milwaukee Brewers minor league system.

== Venezuela national baseball team ==
Ramirez was a member of the team that earned a bronze medal in the 2006 Central American and Caribbean Games. He also played for Venezuela in the 2007 Pan American Games, the 2007 Baseball World Cup and the 2008 America Cup.

== Professional career ==
He played in the Milwaukee Brewers minor league system from 2001 to 2004 for the AZL Brewers (2001), High Desert Mavericks (2002), Helena Brewers (2003) and Beloit Snappers (2004). Overall, he batted .280 with 24 home runs and 139 RBI in 257 games.

== Personal life ==
He was born in Acarigua, Venezuela.
