= Estadio Tomás Arrieta =

Baseball park in Barranquilla, Colombia

Coordinates: 10.5945°N 74.4702°W

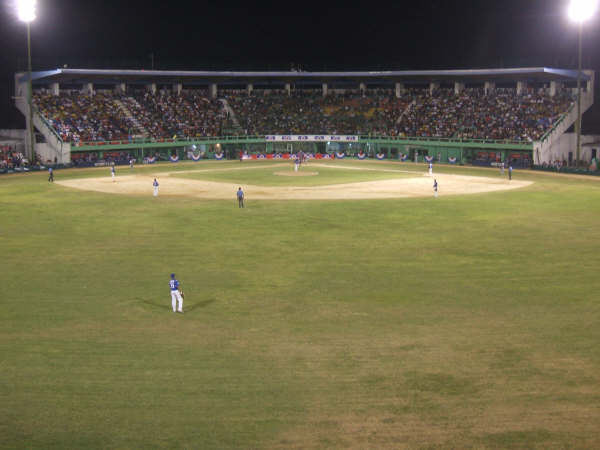
- Interactive map of Estadio Tomás Arrieta
- Location: Barranquilla, Colombia
- Owner: Distrito de Barranquilla
- Operator: Team Rentería
- Capacity: 8,000

Construction
- Built: 1946
- Opened: 1946
- Closed: 2016
- Demolished: 2016
- Cost: COP 90.000 (1946)

Tenant
- Caimanes de Barranquilla

Estadio Tomás Arrieta was a baseball park in Barranquilla, Colombia. It served as the home of the Caimanes de Barranquilla. The stadium held 8,000 people. The stadium was demolished and replaced by Edgar Rentería Stadium.
