= Guatemala national baseball team =

Information
- Country: Guatemala
- Federation: Amateur Baseball Federation of Guatemala
- Confederation: COPABE

WBSC ranking
- Current: 42 (26 March 2026)

The Guatemala national baseball team is the national baseball team of Guatemala. The team is controlled by the Amateur Baseball Federation of Guatemala, and represents the nation in international competitions. The team is a member of the Pan American Baseball Confederation.
