= Matsui =

Matsui (written: 松井 or 松居) is a Japanese surname. Notable people with the surname include:

- Airi Matsui (松井 愛莉, born 1996), Japanese model, actress and former idol
- Akihiko Matsui (松井 聡彦), Japanese videogame designer
- Akihiko Matsui (economist) (松井 彰彦, born 1962), Japanese economist
- Bob Matsui (1941–2005), US California Congressman
- Daigo Matsui (松居 大悟, born 1985), Japanese screenwriter and film director
- Daijiro Matsui (松井 大二郎, born 1972), Japanese mixed martial arts fighter
- Daisuke Matsui (松井 大輔, born 1981), Japanese footballer
- Doris Matsui (born 1944), US congresswoman from California, widow of Bob Matsui
- Eri Matsui (松居 エリ, born 1952), Japanese fashion designer
- Erina Matsui (松井 えり菜, born 1984), Japanese artist
- Fuyuko Matsui (松井 冬子, born 1974) Japanese artist
- Gorō Matsui (松井 五郎, born 1957), Japanese lyricist
- Hideki Matsui (松井 秀喜, born 1974), Japanese former professional baseball player
- Ichirō Matsui (松井 一郎, born 1964), Japanese businessman and politician
- Iwane Matsui (松井 石根, 1878–1948), Japanese general
- Junko Matsui (松井 潤子, 1906–1989), Japanese actress
- Jurina Matsui (松井 珠理奈, born 1997), Japanese singer, SKE48
- Kazuo Matsui (松井 稼頭央, born 1975), Japanese former professional baseball player
- Kazumi Matsui (松井 一實, born 1953), Japanese politician
- Kazuyo Matsui (松居 一代, born 1957), Japanese actress, investor, businesswoman, essayist, university professor (special appointment), and lifestyle (household chores) adviser
- Keiichiro Matsui (松居 圭一郎, born 1994), Japanese badminton player
- Keiko Matsui (松居 慶子, born 1961), Japanese smooth jazz musician
- Keishirō Matsui (松井 慶四郎, 1868–1946), Japanese statesman and diplomat
- KJ Matsui, Japanese basketball player for Columbia University
- Koji Matsui (disambiguation), multiple people
- Masato Matsui (松井 雅人, born 1987), Japanese professional baseball player
- Mitsuru Matsui (松井 充, born 1961), Japanese cryptographer
- Naoko Matsui (松井 菜桜子, born 1961), Japanese voice actor
- Rena Matsui (松井 玲奈, born 1991), Japanese singer, SKE48
- Sakiko Matsui (松井 咲子, born 1990), Japanese idol and pianist, former AKB48
- Shokei Matsui (松井 章奎, born 1963), Japanese karateka and Director of the International Karate Organization
- Sumako Matsui (松井 須磨子, 1886–1919), Japanese actress and singer
- Takafumi Matsui (松井 孝典, 1946–2023), Japanese planetary scientist, geophysicist, science communicator and academic
- Takurō Matsui (松井 太久郎, 1887–1969), Japanese Lieutenant General
- Toshihide Matsui (松井 俊英, born 1978), Japanese tennis player
- Yasuo Matsui (1877–1962), Japanese-American architect
- Yayori Matsui (松井 やより, 1934–2002), Japanese journalist and women's rights activist
- Yoshihiko Matsui (松井 良彦, born 1956), Japanese filmmaker
- Yuki Matsui (松井 裕樹, born 1995), Japanese professional baseball player
- Yusei Matsui (松井 優征), Japanese manga artist
- Yusuke Matsui (松井 佑介, born 1987), Japanese professional baseball player

Fictional characters:

- Chisato Matsui, character in Battle Royale novel, film and manga
- Watanabe Matsui, character in the Megatokyo manga
- Ricky Matsui, character from the web series Dimension 20

Companies and Brands:

- Matsui (brand), a former "own-brand" for electrical appliances used by Dixons Group stores in the UK
- Matsui (construction company), a Japanese construction company founded in 1586

== See also ==
- Mitsui, a Japanese corporation with a similar name
