= Kengo Takeda =

Japanese baseball player (born 1994)

Kengo Takeda 武田健吾
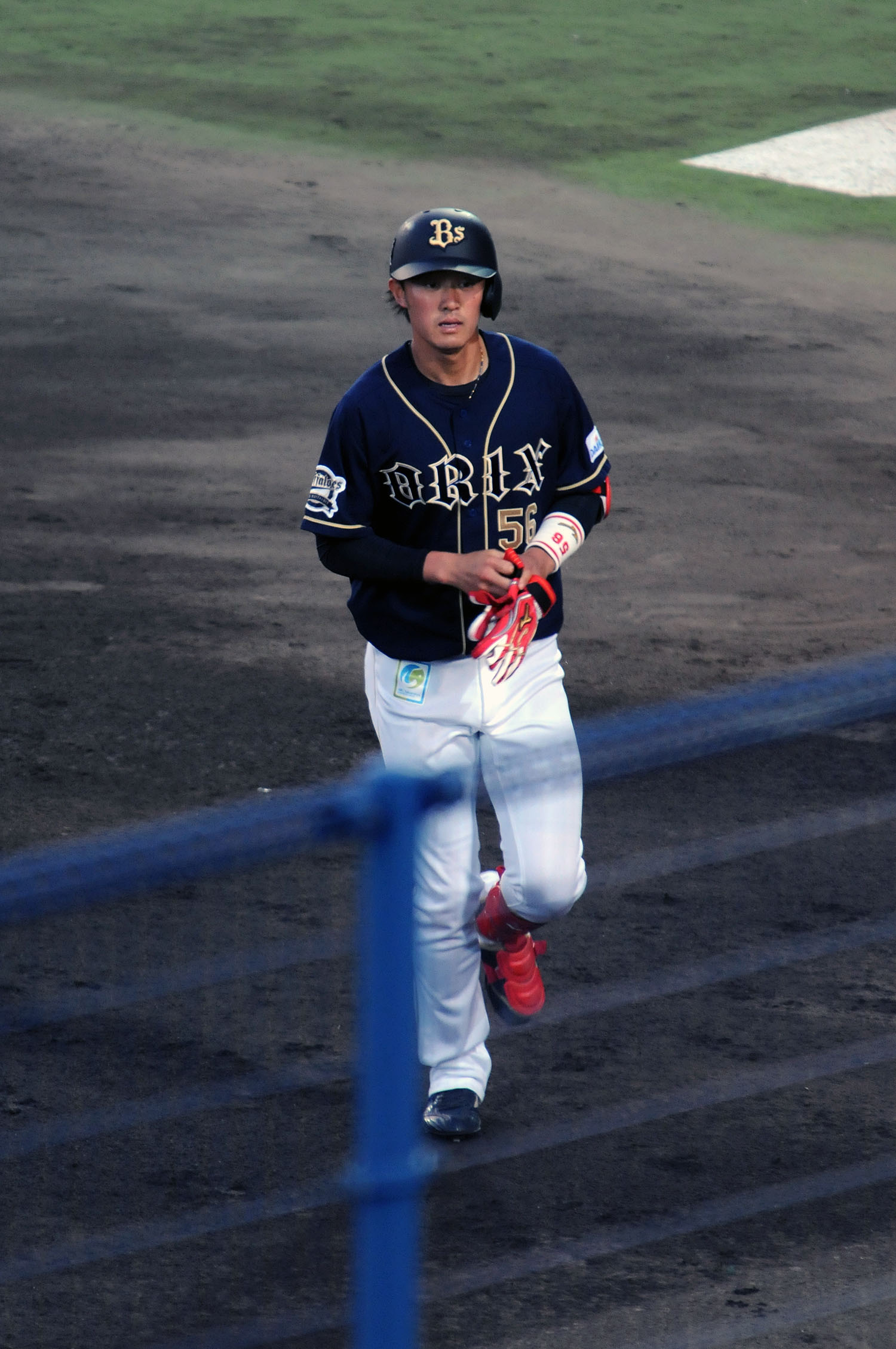
- Outfielder
- Born: April 18, 1994 (age 31); Chikugo, Fukuoka, Japan
- Batted: Right Threw: Right

NPB debut
- October 12, 2013, for the Orix Buffaloes

Last NPB appearance
- October 6, 2021, for the Chunichi Dragons

NPB statistics
- Batting average: .223
- Home runs: 4
- Runs batted in: 32
- Stats at Baseball Reference

Teams
- Orix Buffaloes (2013–2019); Chunichi Dragons (2019–2021)
Medals
Men's baseball
Representing Japan
U-23 Baseball World Cup
Gold medal – first place	2016 Monterrey	Team

Kengo Takeda (武田健吾, Takeda Kengo; born April 18, 1994) is a professional Japanese baseball player. He plays outfielder. He is a free agent. He previously played for the Orix Buffaloes and Chunichi Dragons.

On 30 June 2019, Takeda was traded along with Buffaloes teammate, Takahiro Matsuba to the Chunichi Dragons in exchange for Masato Matsui and Yusuke Matsui.
