= Ren Tomida =

Japanese baseball player (born 2001)

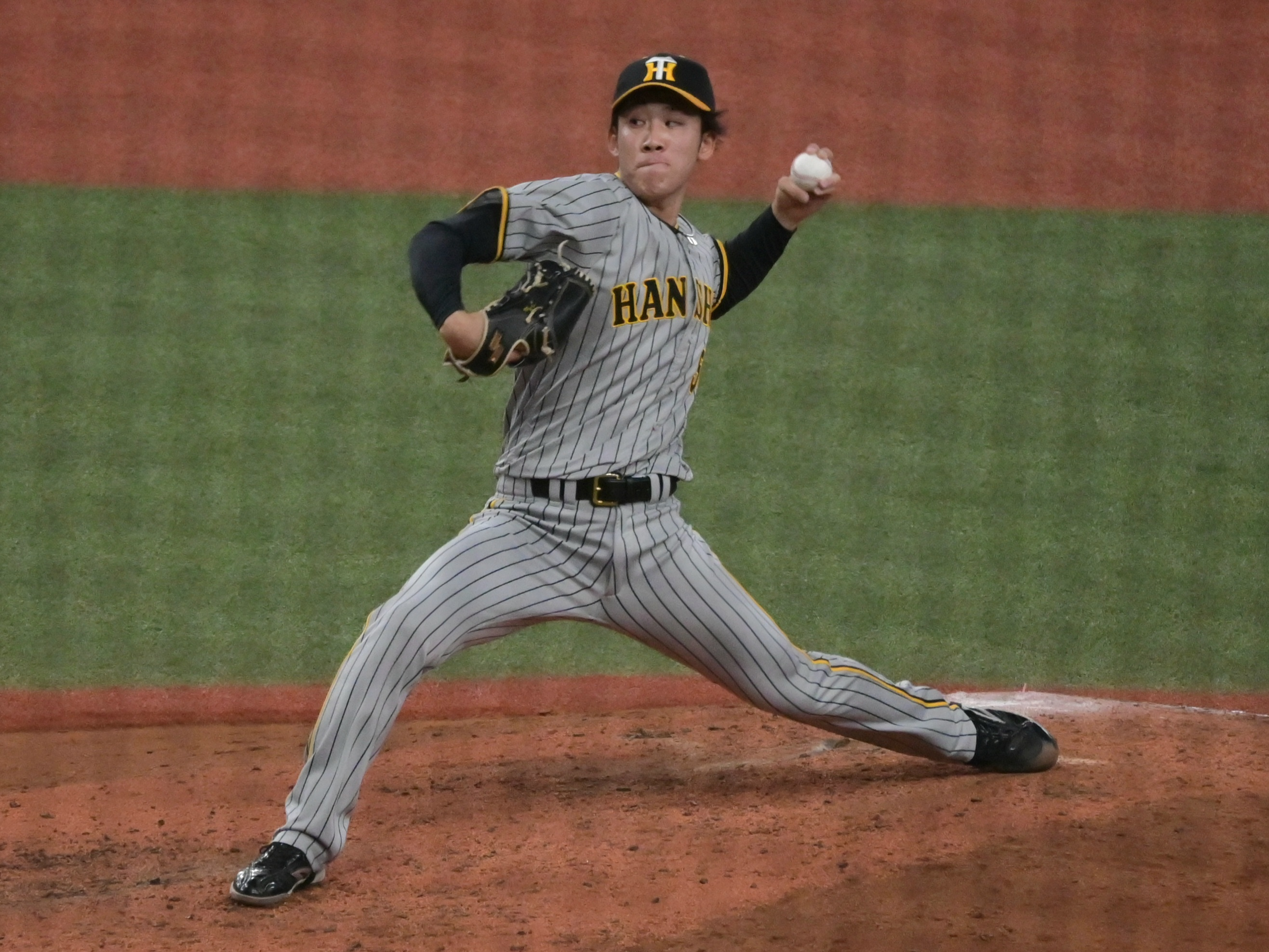

Hanshin Tigers – No. 50
- Pitcher
- Born: September 6, 2001 (age 24); Yōrō District, Gifu, Japan
- Bats: Left Throws: Left

NPB debut
- April 1, 2023, for the Hanshin Tigers

Career statistics (through 2025 season)
- Win–loss record: 2–3
- Earned run average: 2.28
- Strikeouts: 42

Teams
- Hanshin Tigers (2023–present)
Medals
Men's baseball
Representing Japan
U-23 World Cup
Gold medal – first place	2022 Taiwan	Team

Ren Tomida (富田 蓮, Tomida Ren; born September 6, 2001) is a professional Japanese baseball player. He is a pitcher for the Hanshin Tigers of Nippon Professional Baseball (NPB).
