= Hisanori Yasuda =

Japanese baseball player (born 1999)

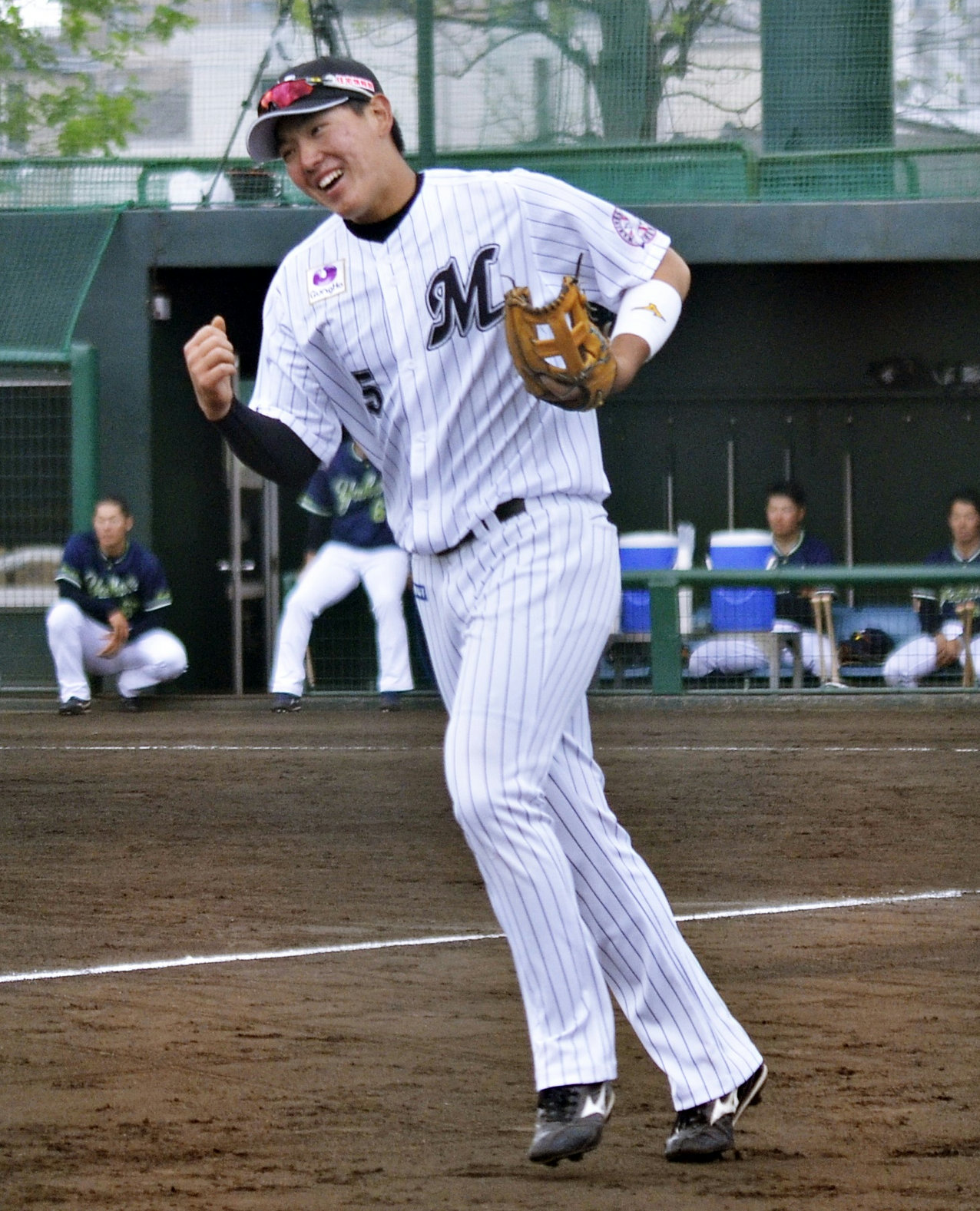

Chiba Lotte Marines – No. 5
- Infielder
- Born: April 15, 1999 (age 26); Suita, Osaka, Japan
- Bats: Left Throws: Right

NPB debut
- March 30, 2018, for the Chiba Lotte Marines

NPB statistics (through April 2, 2022)
- Batting average: .226
- Home runs: 15
- Runs batted in: 117
- Stats at Baseball Reference

Teams
- Chiba Lotte Marines (2018–present)

Career highlights and awards
- NPB All-Star (2023)
Medals
Men's baseball
Representing Japan
U-23 Baseball World Cup
Silver medal – second place	2018 Barranquilla	Team
U-18 Baseball World Cup
Bronze medal – third place	2017 Thunder Bay	Team

Hisanori Yasuda (安田 尚憲, Yasuda Hisanori; born April 15, 1999), nicknamed "Yassan", is a professional Japanese baseball player. He plays infielder for the Chiba Lotte Marines.
