= 2024 U-15 Baseball World Cup =

Tournament details
- Country: Colombia
- Dates: August 16 - August 25
- Teams: 12
- Defending champions: United States

Final positions
- Champions: Japan (1st title)
- Runners-up: Puerto Rico
- Third place: Chinese Taipei
- Fourth place: Nicaragua

Tournament statistics
- Games played: 50

The 2024 U-15 Baseball World Cup or the VI U-15 Baseball World Cup was an international baseball tournament held by the World Baseball Softball Confederation for players 15-year-old and younger. The 2024 edition was held in Barranquilla and Cartagena de Indias, Colombia from August 16 to August 25, 2024.

== Format ==
The tournament will be conducted according to the following format.

First round: The twelve participating nations were drawn into two groups of 6, in which single round robin will occur. The top 3 nations from each group advances to the Super Round, while the bottom 3 nations from each group advance to the consolation round.

Consolation round: The 6 nations in this round play one game against the teams they have not played yet. (example: The 4th placed team from Group A will play the bottom three teams from Group B)

Super round: The format in the super round is similar to that of the consolation round. Each team plays the top three teams from the opposing group. (example: The 1st placed team from Group B will play the top three teams from Group A) The standings for this round will include the 2 games played against the 2 other second-round qualifiers from the team's first-round group, and the 3 games played in the second round, for a total of 5 games. The 3rd and 4th-place finishers advance to the bronze-medal game, and the 1st and 2nd-place finishers advance to the gold-medal game.

Finals: The Finals consist of the Bronze Medal Game, contested by the 3rd and 4th-place finishers, and the gold-medal game, contested by the 1st and 2nd-place finishers.

== Teams ==
The following 12 teams qualified for the tournament.

Pool A	Pool B
Colombia	Mexico
Dominican Republic	Nicaragua
Guam	Netherlands
Italy	South Africa
Japan	Chinese Taipei ^{1}
Puerto Rico	Venezuela

^{1}Republic of China, commonly known as Taiwan, due to complicated relations with People's Republic of China, is recognized by the name Chinese Taipei by most of the international organizations in sports competitions. For more information, please see Cross-Strait relations.

== First round ==
=== Group A ===
Pos	Team	Pld	W	L	RF	RA	PCT	GB	Qualification
1	Japan	5	5	0	52	17	1.000	—	Advance to super round
2	Puerto Rico	5	4	1	54	18	.800	1	Advance to super round
3	Colombia (H)	5	3	2	36	27	.600	2	Advance to super round
4	Dominican Republic	5	2	3	61	29	.400	3	Advance to placement round
5	Italy	5	1	4	28	40	.200	4	Advance to placement round
6	Guam	5	0	5	3	103	.000	5	Advance to placement round

Source: WBSC
(H) Hosts

Date	Local time	Road team	Score	Home team	Inn.	Venue	Game duration	Attendance	Boxscore
Aug 16, 2024	15:00	Guam	0-24	Puerto Rico	F/5	Edgar Renteria Baseball Stadium	2:18	375	Boxscore
Aug 16, 2024	19:00	Dominican Republic	9-12	Japan		Edgar Renteria Baseball Stadium	3:01	500	Boxscore
Aug 16, 2024	19:00	Colombia	11-4	Italy		Estadio Once de Noviembre	3:32	4354	Boxscore
Aug 17, 2024	10:30	Dominican Republic	38-1	Guam	F/5	Edgar Renteria Baseball Stadium	2:26	200	Boxscore
Aug 17, 2024	15:00	Japan	8-3	Italy	F/9	Edgar Renteria Baseball Stadium	2:55	300	Boxscore
Aug 17, 2024	19:00	Colombia	6-7	Puerto Rico	F/8	Edgar Renteria Baseball Stadium	2:48	900	Boxscore
Aug 18, 2024	10:30	Italy	13-1	Guam	F/5	Edgar Renteria Baseball Stadium	2:04	100	Boxscore
Aug 18, 2024	15:00	Puerto Rico	10-4	Dominican Republic		Edgar Renteria Baseball Stadium	2:35	529	Boxscore
Aug 18, 2024	19:00	Japan	14-3	Colombia	F/6	Edgar Renteria Baseball Stadium	2:22	2500	Boxscore
Aug 19, 2024	10:30	Italy	4-11	Puerto Rico		Edgar Renteria Baseball Stadium	2:52	100	Boxscore
Aug 19, 2018	15:00	Guam	0-14	Japan	F/5	Edgar Renteria Baseball Stadium	1:30	250	Boxscore
Aug 19, 2024	19:00	Dominican Republic	1-2	Colombia		Edgar Renteria Baseball Stadium	1:56	2700	Boxscore
Aug 20, 2024	10:30	Puerto Rico	2-4	Japan		Edgar Renteria Baseball Stadium	1:41	200	Boxscore
Aug 20, 2024	15:00	Italy	4-9	Dominican Republic		Edgar Renteria Baseball Stadium	2:09	259	Boxscore
Aug 20, 2024	19:00	Guam	1-14	Colombia	F/5	Edgar Renteria Baseball Stadium	1:35	350	Boxscore

=== Group B ===
Pos	Team	Pld	W	L	RF	RA	PCT	GB	Qualification
1	Chinese Taipei	5	4	1	48	7	.800 (Note: Head-to-head result: Chinese Taipei 12-0 Nicaragua)	—	Advance to super round
2	Nicaragua	5	4	1	35	18	.800	—	Advance to super round
3	Mexico	5	3	2	27	15	.600	1	Advance to super round
4	Venezuela	5	2	3	27	17	.400 (Note: Head-to-head result: Venezuela 11-1 Netherlands)	2	Advance to placement round
5	Netherlands	5	2	3	20	32	.400	2	Advance to placement round
6	South Africa	5	0	5	7	75	.000	4	Advance to placement round

Source: WBSC
Notes:

Date	Local time	Road team	Score	Home team	Inn.	Venue	Game duration	Attendance	Boxscore
Aug 16, 2024	10:30	South Africa	1-13	Mexico	F/5	Edgar Renteria Baseball Stadium	1:47	300	Boxscore
Aug 16, 2024	10:30	Netherlands	1-11	Chinese Taipei	F/6	Estadio Once de Noviembre	2:12	452	Boxscore
Aug 16, 2024	15:00	Nicaragua	4-2	Venezuela		Estadio Once de Noviembre	2:27	1432	Boxscore
Aug 17, 2024	15:00	Venezuela	1-6	Chinese Taipei		Estadio Once de Noviembre	2:37	254	Boxscore
Aug 17, 2024	19:00	Netherlands	3-2	Mexico		Estadio Once de Noviembre	2:13	2134	Boxscore
Aug 18, 2024	10:30	South Africa	0-10	Venezuela	F/5	Estadio Once de Noviembre	1:41	372	Boxscore
Aug 18, 2018	13:30	Nicaragua	21-1	South Africa	F/5	Estadio Once de Noviembre	2:02	103	Boxscore
Aug 18, 2024	15:00	Netherlands	2-3	Nicaragua		Estadio Once de Noviembre	2:09	156	Boxscore
Aug 18, 2024	19:00	Mexico	5-1	Chinese Taipei		Estadio Once de Noviembre	2:05	353	Boxscore
Aug 19, 2024	10:30	Venezuela	11-1	Netherlands		Estadio Once de Noviembre	2:39	234	Boxscore
Aug 19, 2024	15:00	Chinese Taipei	18-0	South Africa	F/5	Estadio Once de Noviembre	1:33	321	Boxscore
Aug 19, 2024	19:00	Nicaragua	7-1	Mexico		Estadio Once de Noviembre	2:45	517	Boxscore
Aug 20, 2024	10:30	South Africa	5-13	Netherlands		Estadio Once de Noviembre	2:19	221	Boxscore
Aug 20, 2024	15:00	Chinese Taipei	12-0	Nicaragua	F/5	Estadio Once de Noviembre	2:18	376	Boxscore
Aug 20, 2024	19:00	Mexico	6-3	Venezuela		Estadio Once de Noviembre	2:27	435	Boxscore

== Super round ==
Pos	Team	Pld	W	L	RF	RA	PCT	GB	Qualification
1	Japan	5	4	1	36	14	.800 (Note: Head-to-head result: Puerto Rico 2-4 Japan)	—	Advance to final
2	Puerto Rico	5	4	1	31	20	.800	—	Advance to final
3	Chinese Taipei	5	3	2	25	18	.600	1	Advance to third-place game
4	Nicaragua	5	2	3	16	25	.400	2	Advance to third-place game
5	Colombia (H)	5	1	4	17	33	.200 (Note: Head-to-head result: Mexico 2-6 Colombia)	3	
6	Mexico	5	1	4	16	31	.200	3	

Source: WBSC
(H) Hosts
Notes:

Date	Local time	Road team	Score	Home team	Inn.	Venue	Game duration	Attendance	Boxscore
Aug 22, 2024	10:30	Puerto Rico	3-1	Nicaragua		Edgar Renteria Baseball Stadium	2:07	350	Boxscore
Aug 22, 2024	15:00	Chinese Taipei	6-5	Japan		Edgar Renteria Baseball Stadium	2:31	500	Boxscore
Aug 22, 2024	19:00	Mexico	2-6	Colombia		Edgar Renteria Baseball Stadium	2:04	2500	Boxscore
Aug 23, 2024	10:30	Puerto Rico	8-2	Chinese Taipei		Edgar Renteria Baseball Stadium	3:11	175	Boxscore
Aug 23, 2024	15:00	Mexico	1-6	Japan		Edgar Renteria Baseball Stadium	1:28	700	Boxscore
Aug 23, 2024	19:00	Colombia	2-6	Nicaragua		Edgar Renteria Baseball Stadium	2:06	2000	Boxscore
Aug 24, 2024	10:30	Mexico	7-11	Puerto Rico		Edgar Renteria Baseball Stadium	2:41	300	Boxscore
Aug 24, 2024	15:00	Nicaragua	2-7	Japan		Edgar Renteria Baseball Stadium	2:08	600	Boxscore
Aug 24, 2024	19:00	Colombia	0-4	Chinese Taipei		Edgar Renteria Baseball Stadium	2:21	1250	Boxscore

== Placement round ==
Pos	Team	Pld	W	L	RF	RA	PCT	GB
1	Dominican Republic	5	5	0	73	15	1.000	—
2	Venezuela	5	4	1	54	18	.800	1
3	Italy	5	3	2	48	28	.600	2
4	Netherlands	5	2	3	32	29	.400	3
5	South Africa	5	1	4	20	61	.200	4
6	Guam	5	0	5	13	89	.000	5

Source: WBSC

Date	Local time	Road team	Score	Home team	Inn.	Venue	Game duration	Attendance	Boxscore
Aug 22, 2024	10:30	Guam	8-9	South Africa	F/8	Estadio Once de Noviembre	2:40	102	Boxscore
Aug 22, 2024	15:00	Netherlands	4-8	Italy		Estadio Once de Noviembre	2:40	201	Boxscore
Aug 22, 2024	19:00	Dominican Republic	5-4	Venezuela		Estadio Once de Noviembre	2:31	584	Boxscore
Aug 23, 2024	10:30	South Africa	4-14	Italy	F/5	Estadio Once de Noviembre	1:53	112	Boxscore
Aug 23, 2024	15:00	Guam	3-19	Venezuela	F/5	Estadio Once de Noviembre	1:57	104	Boxscore
Aug 23, 2024	19:00	Netherlands	4-5	Dominican Republic		Estadio Once de Noviembre	2:08	353	Boxscore
Aug 24, 2024	10:30	Italy	9-10	Venezuela	F/9	Estadio Once de Noviembre	3:10	376	Boxscore
Aug 24, 2024	15:00	South Africa	2-16	Dominican Republic	F/5	Estadio Once de Noviembre	1:50	106	Boxscore
Aug 24, 2024	19:00	Guam	0-10	Netherlands	F/5	Estadio Once de Noviembre	1:37	421	Boxscore

== Finals ==
=== Third-place game ===
Date	Local time	Road team	Score	Home team	Inn.	Venue	Game duration	Attendance	Boxscore
Aug 25, 2024	14:00	Nicaragua	6-7	Chinese Taipei		Edgar Renteria Baseball Stadium	2:33	500	Boxscore

=== Championship ===
Date	Local time	Road team	Score	Home team	Inn.	Venue	Game duration	Attendance	Boxscore
Aug 25, 2024	19:00	Puerto Rico	6-7	Japan		Edgar Renteria Baseball Stadium	2:23	2709	Boxscore

== Final standings ==
Rk	Team	W	L
1	Japan	8	1
Lost in Final
2	Puerto Rico	7	2
Failed to qualify for the Final
3	Chinese Taipei	7	2
Lost in 3rd Place Game
4	Nicaragua	5	4
Failed to qualify for the finals
5	Colombia	4	4
6	Mexico	3	5
Failed to qualify for the super round
7	Dominican Republic	5	3
8	Venezuela	4	4
9	Italy	3	5
10	Netherlands	3	5
11	South Africa	1	7
12	Guam	0	8
