= Kakeru Narita =

Japanese baseball player

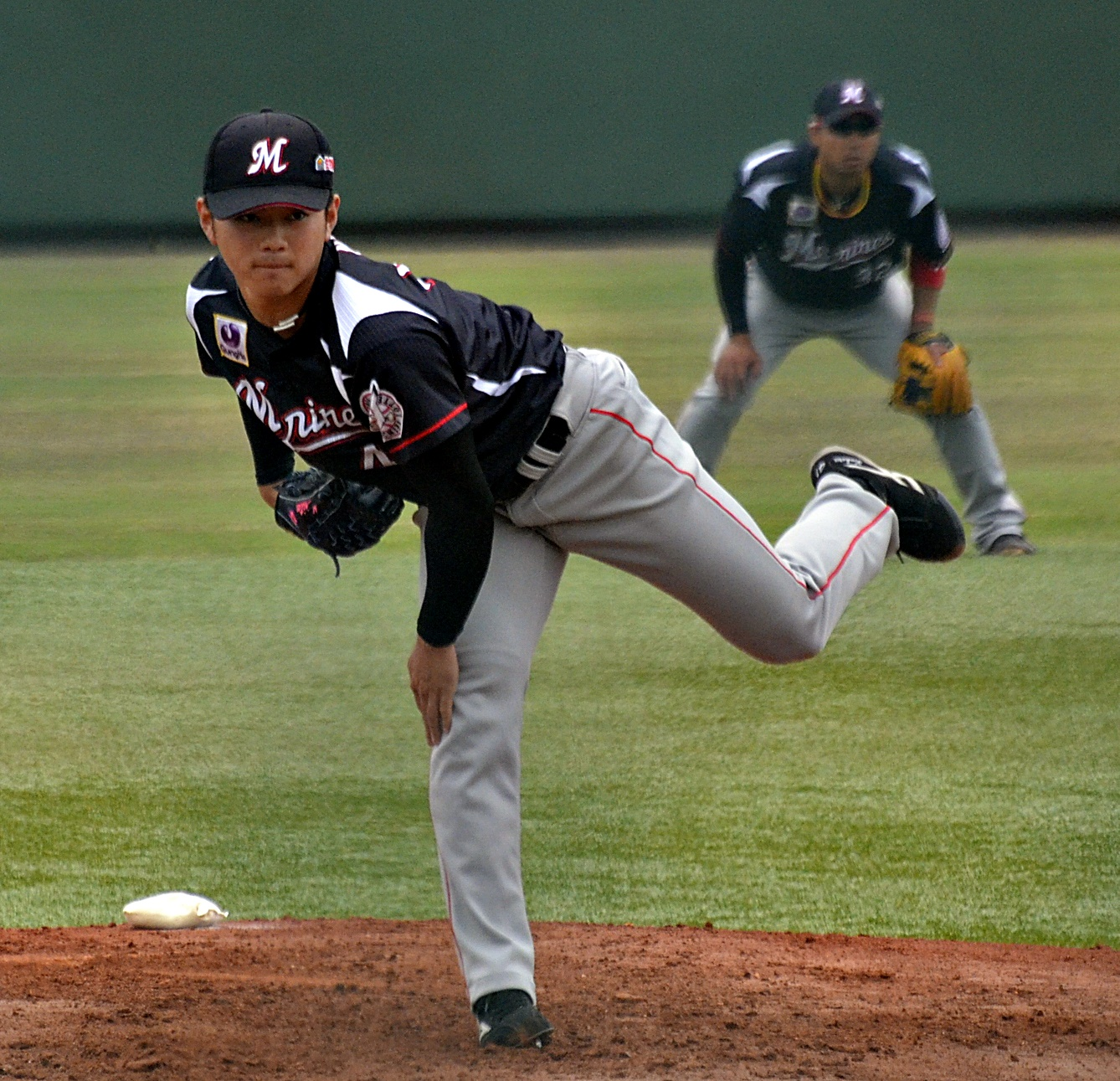

Kawasaki All Club Team
- Pitcher
- Born: February 3, 1998 (age 28); Akita, Akita Prefecture, Japan
- Bats: Left Throws: Left

NPB debut
- September 6, 2017, for the Chiba Lotte Marines

NPB statistics (through 2021 season)
- Win–loss record: 0-2
- Earned run average: 5.64
- Strikeouts: 15
- Stats at Baseball Reference

Teams
- Chiba Lotte Marines (2017–2018; 2020–2022); Tokyo Yakult Swallows (2023)
Medals
Men's baseball
Representing Japan
U-18 Baseball World Cup
Silver medal – second place	2015 Osaka	Team
U-23 Baseball World Cup
Silver medal – second place	2018 Barranquilla	Team

Kakeru Narita (成田 翔, Narita Kakeru; born February 3, 1998) is a Japanese baseball pitcher for the Tokyo Yakult Swallows of Nippon Professional Baseball.

Narita attended Akita Commerce and Business High School, and first represented Japan in international competition during the 2015 U-18 Baseball World Cup. After the tournament, Narita was selected by the Chiba Lotte Marines in the 2015 Nippon Professional Baseball draft as the team's third pick.

He pitched in the Eastern League for the Marines affiliate team during the 2016 season, and made his Nippon Professional Baseball debut the next year, splitting the 2017 season between NPB and the Eastern League. From 2017 to 2021, with the exception of the 2019 season, Narita has spent time in the Eastern League as well as with the Marines at the NPB level. In 2018, Narita played in the U-23 Baseball World Cup and MLB Japan All-Star Series for Japan.
