= Yusuke Masago =

Chinese-Japanese baseball player

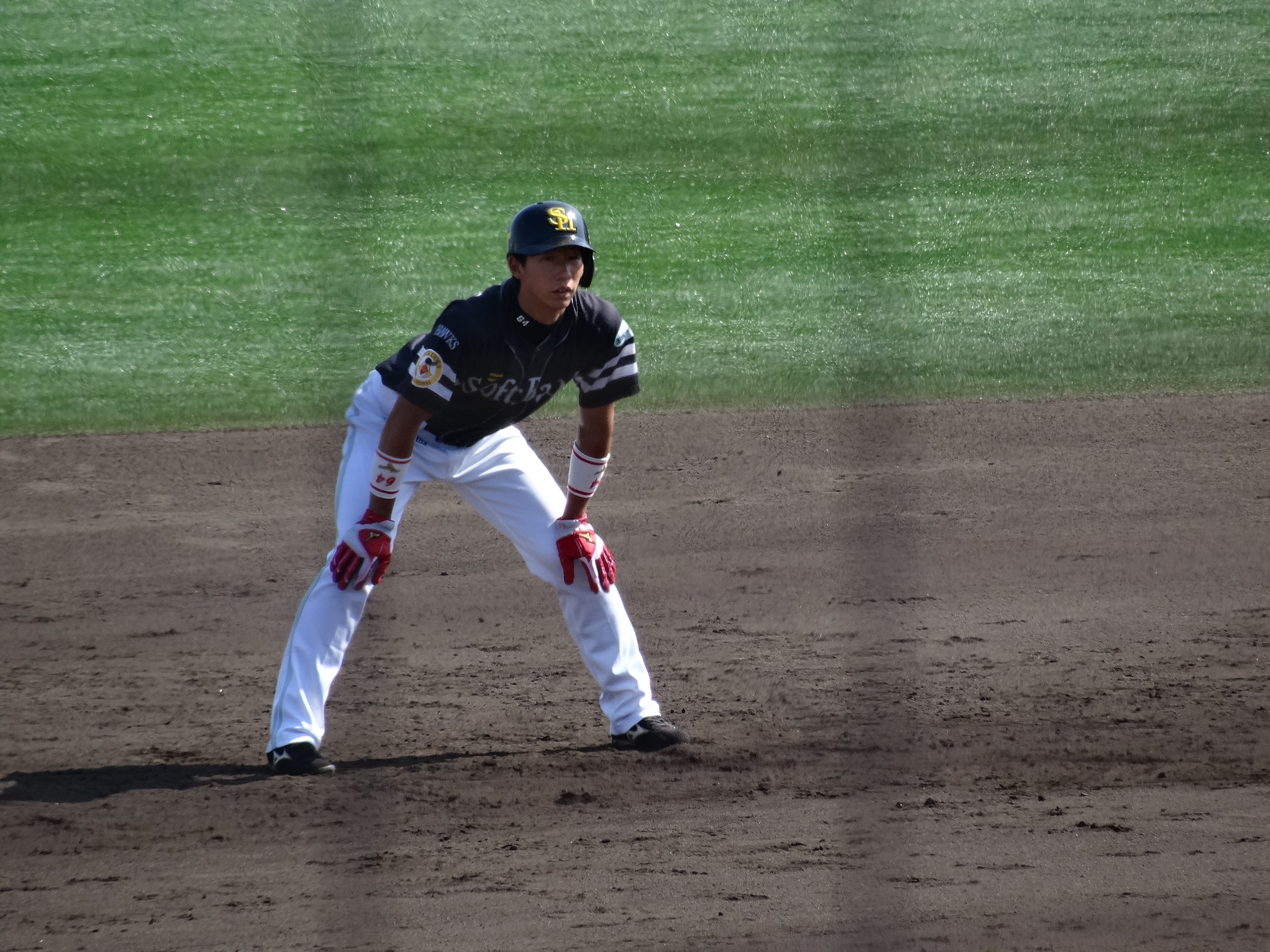
- Masago with the Fukuoka SoftBank Hawks

Free agent
- Outfielder
- Born: May 4, 1994 (age 31); Kyoto City, Kyoto, Japan
- Bats: Right Throws: Right

NPB debut
- July 30, 2017, for the Fukuoka SoftBank Hawks

NPB statistics (through 2022 season)
- Batting average: .219
- Home runs: 3
- Runs batted in: 16
- Stats at Baseball Reference

Teams
- Fukuoka SoftBank Hawks (2017–2022)

Career highlights and awards
- Japan Series champion (2020)
Medals
Men's baseball
Representing Japan
U-23 Baseball World Cup
Gold medal – first place	2016 Monterrey	Team

Yusuke Masago (真砂 勇介, Masago Yusuke; born May 4, 1994) is a Chinese-Japanese professional baseball outfielder. He previously played for the Fukuoka SoftBank Hawks of Nippon Professional Baseball.

== Professional career ==
On October 25, 2012, Masago was drafted by the Fukuoka Softbank Hawks in the 2012 Nippon Professional Baseball draft.

=== Fukuoka SoftBank Hawks ===
==== 2013–2020 season ====
In 2013 - 2016 season, Masago played in informal matches against Shikoku Island League Plus's teams and amateur baseball teams, and played in the Western League of NPB's minor leagues. On November 28, 2016, He was honored for the Western League Big Hope Award at the NPB AWARDS 2016.

On July 14, 2017, Masago debuted in the Pacific League against the Hokkaido Nippon-Ham Fighters. And on August 3, He recorded his first Home run against the Orix Buffaloes. In 2017 season, Masago played 9 games in the Pacific League.

In 2018 season, Masago played only one games in the Pacific League.

In 2019 season, Masago played 12 games in the Pacific League. And he recorded a 26 stolen bases in the Western League and he was honored with the 2019 Western League Most Stolen base Leader Award at the NPB AWARD 2019.

In 2020 season, Masago finished the regular season in 50 games with a batting average of .314, one home runs and a RBI of 6. Masago was selected as the Japan Series roster in the 2020 Japan Series. And he recorded his first hit in the Japan Series.

==== 2021–2022 season ====
In 2021 season, Masago finished the season with a .254 batting average, a one home run, and eight RBI in a career-high 71 games.

In 2022 season, he had a .301 batting average and eight home runs in the Western League, but in the Pacific League he slumped to a .071 batting average in 29 games. October 17, 2022, the Hawks announced he was a free agent.

== International career ==
Masago represented the Japan national baseball team at the 2016 U-23 Baseball World Cup. And he was honored for the Most valuable player and the Best Nine Award at the 2016 U-23 Baseball World Cup.

Masago committed to play for the China national baseball team at the 2023 World Baseball Classic. His father is Chinese and his mother is half-Chinese, half-Japanese.
