= Leandro Cedeño =

Venezuelan baseball player (born 1998)

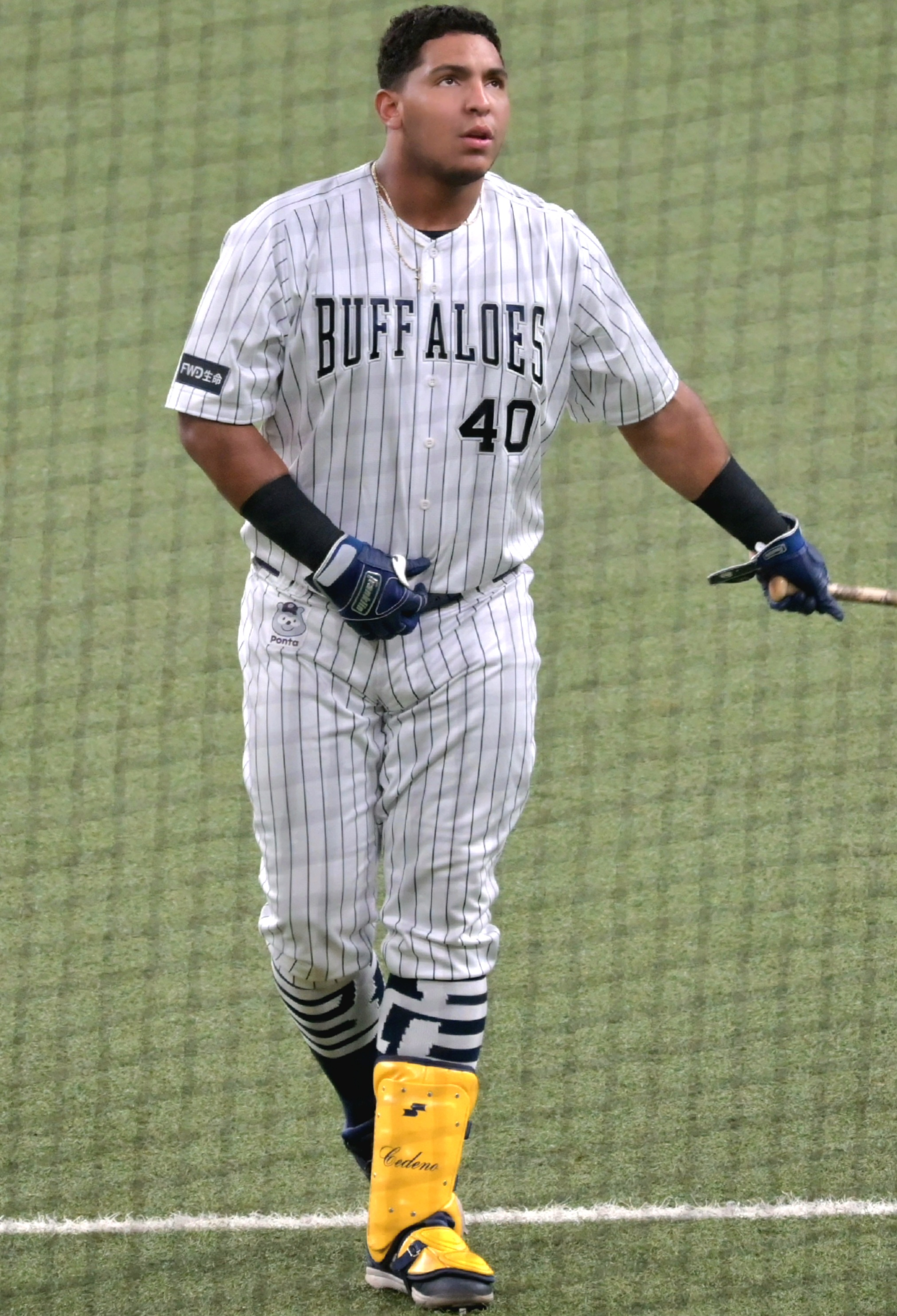
- Cedeno with Orix Buffaloes in 2023

Free agent
- Infielder
- Born: August 22, 1998 (age 28); Guatire, Venezuela
- Bats: Right Throws: Right

NPB debut
- May 19, 2023, for the Orix Buffaloes

NPB statistics (through 2026 season)
- Batting average: .244
- Home runs: 31
- Runs batted in: 99
- Stats at Baseball Reference

Teams
- Orix Buffaloes (2023–2024); Saitama Seibu Lions (2025); Tokyo Yakult Swallows (2026)
Medals
Men's baseball
Representing Venezuela
U-23 Baseball World Cup
Bronze medal – third place	2018 Barranquilla	Team

Leandro Arturo Cedeño (born August 22, 1998) is a Venezuelan professional baseball infielder who is a free agent. He has previously played in Nippon Professional Baseball (NPB) for the Orix Buffaloes, Saitama Seibu Lions, and Tokyo Yakult Swallows.

== Career ==
=== St. Louis Cardinals ===
On August 29, 2014, Cedeño signed with the St. Louis Cardinals organization as an international free agent. He made his professional debut with the Dominican Summer League Cardinals, appearing in 74 games for the team from 2015 to 2016.

After playing in only 9 games for the rookie-level GCL Cardinals in 2017, Cedeño spent the 2018 season with the rookie-level Johnson City Cardinals, playing in 59 games and hitting .336/.419/.592 with career-highs in home runs (14) and RBI (47). In 2019, Cedeño played in 100 games for the Single-A Peoria Chiefs, slashing .271/.311/.396 with 6 home runs and 44 RBI. He did not play in a game in 2020 due to the cancellation of the minor league season because of the COVID-19 pandemic. Cedeño split the 2021 season between Peoria and the Double-A Springfield Cardinals, batting a cumulative .260/.316/.427 with 12 home runs and 60 RBI across 96 games. He elected free agency following the season on November 7, 2021.

=== Arizona Diamondbacks ===
On November 22, 2021, Cedeño signed a minor league contract with the Arizona Diamondbacks organization. He was assigned to the Double-A Amarillo Sod Poodles to begin the 2022 season. He hit a 527-foot (161 m) home run for Amarillo on July 17, 2022, the longest measured since the debut of Statcast in 2015. Cedeño enjoyed a career year with Amarillo, hitting an excellent .310/.374/.563 with new career-highs in home runs (30) and RBI (93). This led to him being promoted to Triple-A for the first time on September 6. He played in 14 games for the Triple-A Reno Aces, hitting .291/.328/.436 while adding on 2 more home runs and 10 more RBI. Cedeño became a free agent following the season on November 10, 2022.

=== Orix Buffaloes ===
On December 27, 2022, Cedeño signed with the Orix Buffaloes of Nippon Professional Baseball. He played in 57 games for Orix in 2023, slashing .244/.278/.438 with nine home runs and 34 RBI.

Cedeño played in 98 games for the Buffaloes in 2024, hitting .260/.320/.438 with 15 home runs and 37 RBI. On December 2, 2024, he became a free agent.

=== Saitama Seibu Lions ===
On December 14, 2024, Cedeño signed with the Saitama Seibu Lions of Nippon Professional Baseball. He made 74 appearances for the Lions in 2025, batting .228/.280/.357 with seven home runs and 26 RBI. On November 18, 2025, Seibu announced that Cedeño would not be offered a contract for the 2026 season.

=== San Diego Padres ===
On January 30, 2026, Cedeño signed with the Algodoneros de Unión Laguna of the Mexican League. However, on February 6, 2026, Cedeño signed a minor league contract with the San Diego Padres. He made 26 appearances for the Double-A San Antonio Missions, batting .315/.421/.528 with four home runs and 14 RBI. Cedeño was released by the Padres organization on May 27.

=== Tokyo Yakult Swallows ===
On May 28, 2026, Cedeño signed with the Tokyo Yakult Swallows of Nippon Professional Baseball. On October 8, the Swallows announced they would not re-signed Cedeño for the 2027 season.
