= 2022 U-23 Baseball World Cup =

Tournament details
- Country: Taiwan
- Dates: October 13 – 23
- Teams: 12
- Defending champions: Venezuela

Final positions
- Champions: Japan (2nd title)
- Runners-up: South Korea
- Third place: Chinese Taipei
- Fourth place: Mexico

Tournament statistics
- Games played: 50

Awards
- MVP: (Japan) Ryusei Gonda
- All statistics correct as of 2022-10-24.

The 2022 U-23 Baseball World Cup, officially IV U-23 Baseball World Cup, is the fourth edition of the U-23 Baseball World Cup tournament. It was held in Taipei, Taichung, and Yunlin in Taiwan. Players born between 1999 and 2004 are eligible to play the tournament.

== Venues ==
Tianmu Baseball Stadium hosted the opening ceremony and is scheduled to host all of the Group B games and medal games. Douliu Baseball Stadium and Taichung Intercontinental Baseball Stadium were scheduled to host all of the Group A games.

Douliu	Taichung	Taipei
Douliu Baseball Stadium	Taichung Intercontinental Baseball Stadium	Tianmu Baseball Stadium
Capacity: 15,000	Capacity: 20,000	Capacity: 10,500

== Teams ==
China and Nicaragua were replaced in the tournament by Puerto Rico and Colombia due to COVID-19 restrictions in those countries. The WBSC World Rankings as of the time of the competition is specified in parentheses.

Africa

South Africa (26)

Americas

Mexico (4)
Venezuela (6)
Cuba (9)
Colombia (11)
Puerto Rico (16)

Asia

Japan (1)
Chinese Taipei (2)
South Korea (3)

Europe

Netherlands (8)
Germany (18)

Oceania

Australia (10)

== First round ==
=== Group A ===
Pos	Team	Pld	W	L	RF	RA	PCT	GB	Qualification
1	Chinese Taipei (H)	5	5	0	30	7	1.000	—	Advance to super round
2	Japan	5	4	1	25	6	.800	1	Advance to super round
3	Colombia	5	3	2	28	17	.600	2	Advance to super round
4	Venezuela	5	2	3	28	20	.400	3	Advance to placement round
5	Germany	5	1	4	13	23	.200	4	Advance to placement round
6	South Africa	5	0	5	1	52	.000	5	Advance to placement round

Source: WBSC
(H) Hosts
- All times are Taipei Standard Time (UTC+08:00).

Date	Local time	Road team	Score	Home team	Inn.	Venue	Game duration	Attendance	Boxscore
Oct 13, 2022	18:30	Colombia	2 – 6	Chinese Taipei	F/7	Tianmu	2:18	1250	Boxscore
Oct 14, 2022	12:00	South Africa	0 – 9	Venezuela	F/7	Douliu	1:48	45	Boxscore
Oct 14, 2022	17:00	Japan	6 – 0	Germany	F/7	Douliu	1:57	48	Boxscore
Oct 15, 2022	10:00	South Africa	0 – 10	Colombia	F/6	Taichung	2:15	78	Boxscore
Oct 15, 2022	14:30	Japan	5 – 2	Venezuela	F/7	Taichung	2:07	150	Boxscore
Oct 15, 2022	19:00	Germany	0 – 3	Chinese Taipei	F/7	Taichung	2:15	525	Boxscore
Oct 16, 2022	10:00	Venezuela	7 – 8	Colombia	F/8	Taichung	2:44	120	Boxscore
Oct 16, 2022	14:30	South Africa	0 – 10	Germany	F/6	Taichung	2:22	232	Boxscore
Oct 16, 2022	19:00	Chinese Taipei	3 – 1	Japan	F/7	Taichung	2:16	2800	Boxscore
Oct 17, 2022	10:00	Germany	3 – 7	Venezuela	F/7	Taichung	2:49	42	Boxscore
Oct 17, 2021	14:30	Colombia	1 – 4	Japan	F/7	Taichung	2:21	120	Boxscore
Oct 17, 2022	19:00	Chinese Taipei	14 – 1	South Africa	F/5	Taichung	1:59	125	Boxscore
Oct 18, 2022	10:00	Germany	0 – 7	Colombia	F/7	Taichung	2:18	50	Boxscore
Oct 18, 2022	14:30	Japan	9 – 0	South Africa	F/7	Taichung	2:11	94	Boxscore
Oct 18, 2022	19:00	Venezuela	3 – 4	Chinese Taipei	F/8	Taichung	3:23	350	Boxscore

=== Group B ===
Pos	Team	Pld	W	L	RF	RA	PCT	GB	Qualification
1	South Korea	5	5	0	16	5	1.000	—	Advance to super round
2	Australia	5	2	3	19	14	.400 (Note: Five-way tie decided by TQB)	3	Advance to super round
3	Mexico	5	2	3	9	8	.400	3	Advance to super round
4	Netherlands	5	2	3	11	16	.400	3	Advance to placement round
5	Cuba	5	2	3	7	13	.400	3	Advance to placement round
6	Puerto Rico	5	2	3	11	17	.400	3	Advance to placement round

Source: WBSC
Notes:
- All times are Taipei Standard Time (UTC+08:00).

Date	Local time	Road team	Score	Home team	Inn.	Venue	Game duration	Attendance	Boxscore
Oct 14, 2022	10:00	Puerto Rico	5 – 0	Cuba	F/7	Tianmu	2:26	132	Boxscore
Oct 14, 2022	14:30	Mexico	3 – 2	Australia	F/8	Tianmu	2:12	145	Boxscore
Oct 14, 2022	19:00	South Korea	4 – 0	Netherlands	F/7	Tianmu	1:55	157	Boxscore
Oct 16, 2021	16:00	Netherlands	0 – 4	Mexico	F/7	Douliu	1:57	325	Boxscore
Oct 16, 2022	19:00	Cuba	0 – 4	South Korea	F/7	Douliu	2:53	190	Boxscore
Oct 17, 2022	12:30	Mexico	2 – 3	Puerto Rico	F/8	Douliu	2:02	45	Boxscore
Oct 17, 2022	15:30	Netherlands	3 – 2	Cuba	F/7	Douliu	2:15	75	Boxscore
Oct 17, 2022	18:30	Australia	3 – 4	South Korea	F/7	Douliu	2:31	174	Boxscore
Oct 18, 2022	10:00	Cuba	2 – 0	Mexico	F/7	Tianmu	2:10	40	Boxscore
Oct 18, 2022	13:00	Puerto Rico	2 – 3	South Korea	F/8	Tianmu	2:20	60	Boxscore
Oct 18, 2022	16:00	Australia	5 – 4	Netherlands	F/7	Tianmu	2:26	106	Boxscore
Oct 18, 2021	19:00	Puerto Rico	0 – 8	Australia	F/7	Tianmu	2:13	87	Boxscore
Oct 19, 2021	10:00	Australia	1 – 3	Cuba	F/7	Tianmu	2:36	101	Boxscore
Oct 19, 2022	12:30	Netherlands	4 – 1	Puerto Rico	F/8	Tianmu	2:36	70	Boxscore
Oct 19, 2022	15:00	South Korea	1 – 0	Mexico	F/8	Tianmu	2:24	151	Boxscore

== Placement round ==
Pos	Team	Pld	W	L	RF	RA	PCT	GB
1	Venezuela	5	4	1	23	7	.800 (Note: Head-to-head result: Netherlands 0–3 Venezuela)	—
2	Netherlands	5	4	1	27	9	.800	—
3	Puerto Rico	5	3	2	21	9	.600 (Note: Head-to-head result: Puerto Rico 5–0 Cuba)	1
4	Cuba	5	3	2	16	10	.600	1
5	Germany	5	1	4	16	16	.200	3
6	South Africa	5	0	5	3	55	.000	4

Source: WBSC
Notes:
- All times are Taipei Standard Time (UTC+08:00).

Date	Local time	Road team	Score	Home team	Inn.	Venue	Game duration	Attendance	Boxscore
Oct 20, 2022	11:00	Netherlands	0 – 3	Venezuela	F/7	Douliu	1:53	30	Boxscore
Oct 20, 2022	14:00	Germany	2 – 3	Cuba	F/7	Douliu	1:49	45	Boxscore
Oct 20, 2022	17:00	South Africa	0 – 10	Puerto Rico	F/5	Douliu	1:39	34	Boxscore
Oct 21, 2022	11:00	Cuba	2 – 0	Venezuela	F/7	Douliu	1:57	-	Boxscore
Oct 21, 2022	14:00	South Africa	3 – 17	Netherlands	F/5	Douliu	1:51	-	Boxscore
Oct 21, 2022	17:00	Puerto Rico	3 – 1	Germany	F/7	Douliu	2:10	-	Boxscore
Oct 22, 2022	11:00	South Africa	0 – 9	Cuba	F/7	Douliu	1:52	-	Boxscore
Oct 22, 2022	14:00	Puerto Rico	2 – 4	Venezuela	F/7	Douliu	2:15	-	Boxscore
Oct 22, 2022	17:00	Germany	0 – 3	Netherlands	F/7	Douliu	2:02	-	Boxscore

== Super round ==
Pos	Team	Pld	W	L	RF	RA	PCT	GB	Qualification
1	Japan	5	4	1	13	8	.800 (Note: Head-to-head result: Japan 2–1 South Korea)	—	Advance to final
2	South Korea	5	4	1	17	11	.800	—	Advance to final
3	Mexico	5	3	2	11	11	.600	1	Advance to third-place game
4	Chinese Taipei	5	2	3	12	14	.400	2	Advance to third-place game
5	Colombia	5	1	4	18	25	.200 (Note: Head-to-head result: Colombia 8–6 Australia)	3	
6	Australia	5	1	4	15	17	.200	3	

Source: WBSC
Notes:
- All times are Taipei Standard Time (UTC+08:00).

Date	Local time	Road team	Score	Home team	Inn.	Venue	Game duration	Attendance	Boxscore
Oct 20, 2022	10:00	Colombia	3 – 4	Mexico	F/7	Tianmu	2:12	32	Boxscore
Oct 20, 2022	14:30	Australia	1 – 2	Japan	F/7	Tianmu	1:52	97	Boxscore
Oct 20, 2022	19:00	South Korea	6 – 2	Chinese Taipei	F/7	Tianmu	2:40	3,921	Boxscore
Oct 21, 2022	10:00	Colombia	8 – 6	Australia	F/7	Tianmu	2:25	-	Boxscore
Oct 21, 2022	14:30	Japan	2 – 1	South Korea	F/7	Tianmu	2:22	-	Boxscore
Oct 21, 2022	19:00	Mexico	2 – 1	Chinese Taipei	F/8	Tianmu	2:59	-	Boxscore
Oct 22, 2022	10:00	Colombia	4 – 5	South Korea	F/8	Tianmu	2:33	-	Boxscore
Oct 22, 2022	13:00	Mexico	2 – 4	Japan	F/7	Tianmu	2:25	-	Boxscore
Oct 22, 2022	16:00	Australia	3 – 0	Chinese Taipei	F/7	Tianmu	2:16	-	Boxscore

== Finals ==
=== Third-place game ===
Date	Local time	Road team	Score	Home team	Inn.	Venue	Game duration	Attendance	Boxscore
Oct 23, 2022	14:30	Chinese Taipei	3 – 1	Mexico	F/7	Tianmu	2:26	481	Boxscore

=== Championship ===
Date	Local time	Road team	Score	Home team	Inn.	Venue	Game duration	Attendance	Boxscore
Oct 23, 2022	19:00	South Korea	0 – 3	Japan	F/7	Tianmu	1:52	388	Boxscore

== Final standings ==
Rk	Team	W	L
1st place, gold medalist(s)	Japan	8	1
Lost in Final
2nd place, silver medalist(s)	South Korea	7	2
Won in 3rd-place game
3rd place, bronze medalist(s)	Chinese Taipei	6	3
Lost in 3rd-place game
4	Mexico	4	5
Failed to qualify for the finals
5	Colombia	4	4
6	Australia	3	5
Failed to qualify for the super round
7	Venezuela	4	4
8	Netherlands	4	4
9	Puerto Rico	4	4
10	Cuba	5	3
11	Germany	1	7
12	South Africa	0	8

2022 U-23 Baseball World Cup

Japan
2nd title

== Awards ==
=== U23 All-World Team ===
Position	Player
C	(Venezuela) David Garcia
1B	(Venezuela) Jesus Chirinos
2B	(Colombia) Carlos Arroyo
3B	(Japan) Hiroki Nakagawa
SS	(Cuba) Christian Rodriguez
OF	(Chinese Taipei) Chen Tso Tseng
OF	(Puerto Rico) Ezequiel Pagan
OF	(Australia) Christopher Burke
DH	(Japan) Ren Onishi
P	(Japan) Ren Tomida
P	(Japan) Ryusei Gonda

=== Individual Award ===
Award	Player	Statistics
Leading Hitter	(Japan) Ren Onishi	.500
Best ERA	(South Korea) Saangyung Lee	0.00 (13 innings pitched)
Best Pitching Record	(Japan) Ren Tomida	2W 0L
Most RBI	(Venezuela) Jesus Chirinos	8
Most HR	(Venezuela) Jesus Chirinos	2
Most Stolen Bases	(Venezuela) Michael Chirinos	5
Most Runs Scored	(Colombia) Daniel Aguilar	7
Outstanding Defensive Player	(South Korea) Hanbyul Kim	-

== See also ==
- List of sporting events in Taiwan
