= Alain Sánchez =

Cuban baseball player (born 1986)

Naranjas de Villa Clara
- Pitcher
- Born: March 30, 1986 (age 40); Cifuentes, Cuba
- Bats: Right Throws: Right
- Stats at Baseball Reference
Medals
Men's baseball
Representing Cuba
Central American and Caribbean Games
| Silver medal – second place | 2018 Barranquilla | Team |

Alain Sánchez Machado (born March 30, 1986) is a Cuban professional baseball pitcher for Naranjas de Villa Clara in the Cuban National Series.

Sánchez played for the Cuba national baseball team at the 2004 World Junior Baseball Championship and 2017 World Baseball Classic.
