= Carlos Benítez =

Cuban baseball player (born 1987)

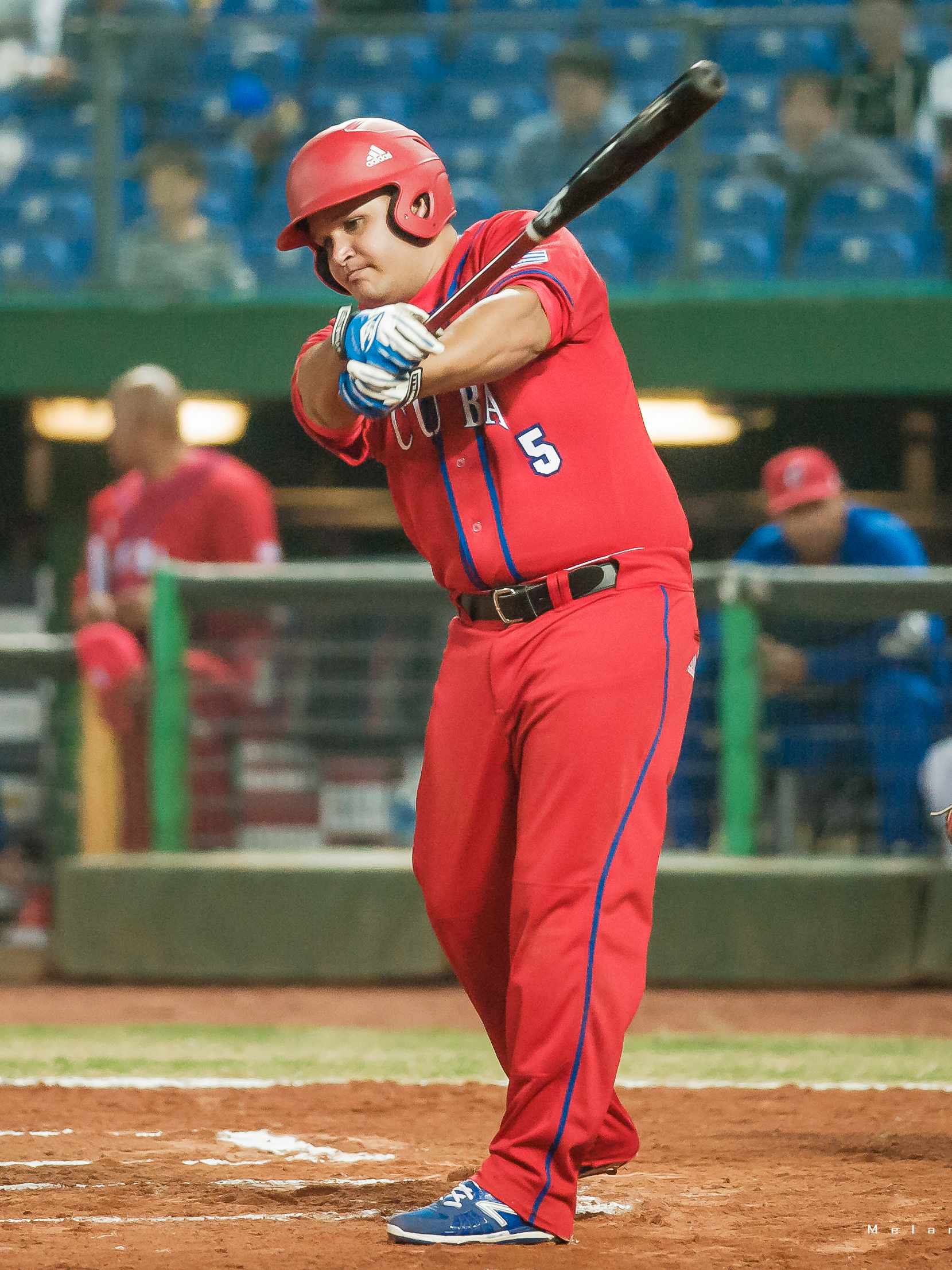
- Benítez in 2017

Alazanes de Granma
- Second baseman
- Born: November 1, 1987 (age 38); Yara, Cuba
- Bats: Right Throws: Right
- Stats at Baseball Reference
Medals
Men's baseball
Representing Cuba
Central American and Caribbean Games
| Silver medal – second place | 2018 Barranquilla | Team |

Carlos Benítez Pérez (born Enero 11, 1987) is a Cuban professional baseball second baseman for Alazanes de Granma in the Cuban National Series.

Benítez played for the Cuba national baseball team at the 2017 World Baseball Classic and 2019 Pan American Games.
