= Yoelqui Céspedes =

Cuban baseball player (born 1997)

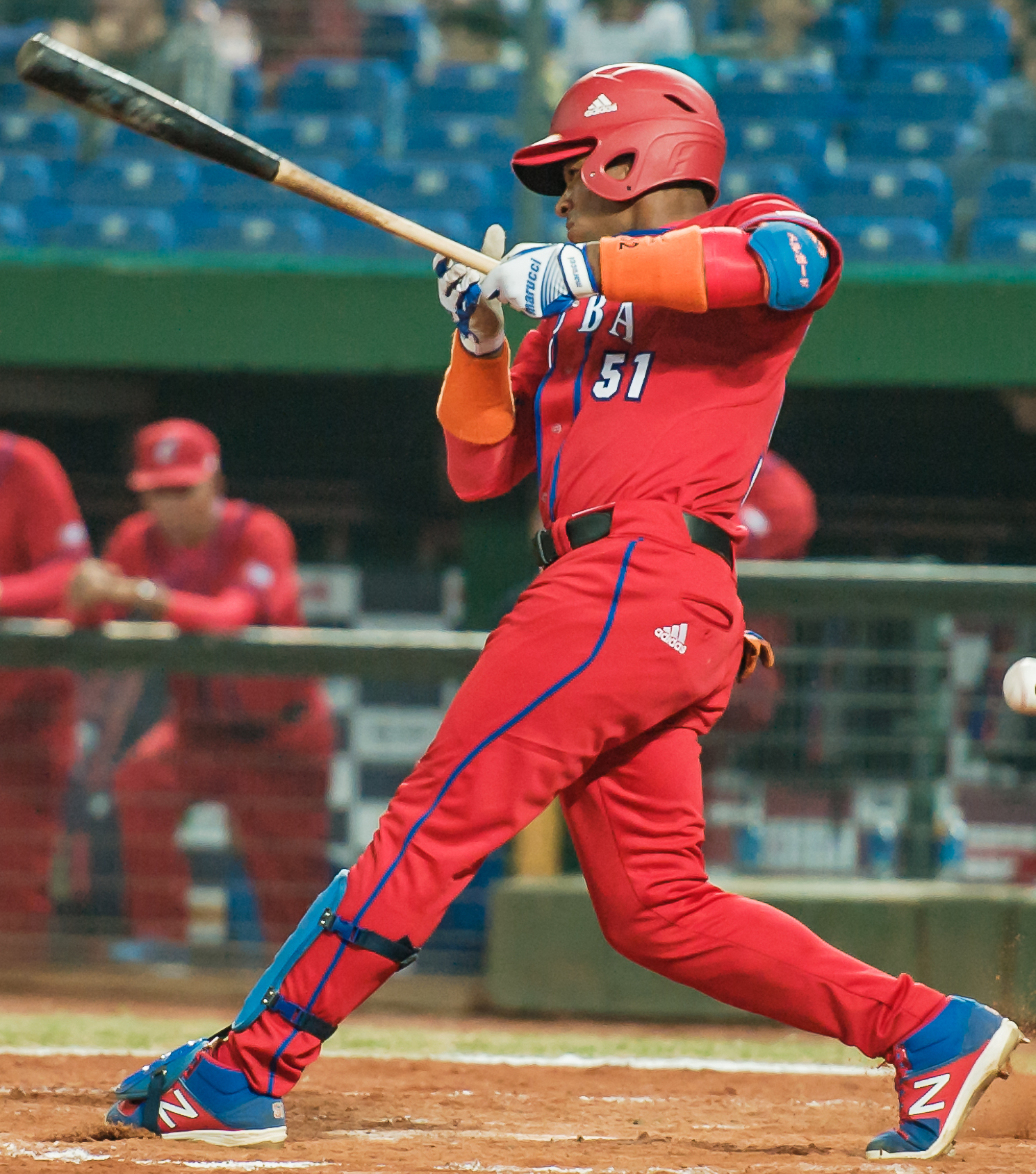
- Céspedes with the Cuba national baseball team in 2017

Free agent
- Outfielder
- Born: September 24, 1997 (age 29); Yara, Cuba
- Bats: Right Throws: Right
- Stats at Baseball Reference
Medals
Men's baseball
Representing Cuba
Central American and Caribbean Games
| Silver medal – second place | 2018 Barranquilla | Team |

Yoelqui Céspedes Maceo (born September 24, 1997), also known as Yoelkis Céspedes, is a Cuban professional baseball outfielder who is a free agent. He played for Alazanes de Granma of the Cuban National Series before he defected from Cuba.

== Career ==
=== Early career ===
Céspedes played for the Alazanes de Granma of the Cuban National Series. He batted .287/.351/.415 in Cuba. He also played for the Cuba national baseball team in the 2017 World Baseball Classic.

On June 25, 2019, Céspedes defected from Cuba while in Dayton, Ohio. At the time, he was playing for the Cuba national baseball team, which was participating in a CanAm League showcase event. He worked out in the Bahamas, preparing for Major League Baseball to declare him a free agent.

=== Chicago White Sox ===
On December 22, 2020, Céspedes agreed to a $2 million contract with the Chicago White Sox. The White Sox announced the signing on January 15, 2021. On June 19, he was assigned to the high-A Winston-Salem Dash of High-A East. In June 2021, Cespedes was selected to play in the All-Star Futures Game. The White Sox promoted Céspedes to the Birmingham Barons of Double-A South and assigned him to the Glendale Desert Dogs of the Arizona Fall League after the regular season. He played for Birmingham for the 2022 season and batted .258 with 17 home runs and 59 RBI in 119 games played; he also had 154 strikeouts and only 29 walks.

Céspedes split the 2023 season between Birmingham and the Triple–A Charlotte Knights. In 121 games between the two affiliates, he batted .230/.319/.350 with 10 home runs, 37 RBI, and 16 stolen bases. On March 30, 2024, Céspedes was released by the White Sox organization.

=== Fargo-Moorhead RedHawks ===
On April 24, 2024, Céspedes signed with the Fargo-Moorhead RedHawks of the American Association of Professional Baseball. In 3 games for the RedHawks, he went 0–for–11 with no home runs or RBI. On May 16, Céspedes was released by the RedHawks.

=== Long Island Ducks ===
On August 10, 2024, Céspedes signed with the Long Island Ducks of the Atlantic League of Professional Baseball. In 22 appearances for Long Island, he slashed .262/.326/.321 with one home run and 10 RBI. Céspedes became a free agent following the season.

=== Tecolotes de los Dos Laredos ===
On June 18, 2026, Céspedes signed with the Tecolotes de los Dos Laredos of the Mexican League. In 35 games, he batted .270/.301/.360 with seven RBI and two stolen bases. On September 24, 2026, Céspedes was released by Dos Laredos.

== Personal life ==
His half-brother is Yoenis Céspedes.

== See also ==
- List of baseball players who defected from Cuba
