= Efraín Contreras =

Venezuelan baseball player (born 1987)

Efrain Contreras
- Outfielder
- Born: February 6, 1987 (age 39); Maracay, Venezuela
- Bats: Right Throws: Right
- Stats at Baseball Reference
Medals
Men's baseball
Representing Colombia
Central American and Caribbean Games
Bronze medal – third place	2018 Barranquilla	Team

Efrain Daniel Contreras (born February 6, 1987) is a Venezuelan former professional baseball outfielder.

== Career ==
=== Cincinnati Reds ===
On May 11, 2004, Contreras signed with the Cincinnati Reds as an international free agent. He would spend the next 4 seasons with rookie-league affiliates, hitting a cumulative 17 home runs with 86 RBI in 168 total games. Contreras split the 2008 season between the Gulf Coast Reds and High-A Sarasota Reds, hitting .252/.324/.377 with 2 home runs and 34 RBI.

Contreras spent the 2009 season with the rookie-level Billings Mustangs, slashing .301/.396/.412 with 2 home runs, 14 RBI, and 6 stolen bases. In 2010, he split the year between the Single-A Dayton Dragons and High-A Lynchburg Hillcats, playing in 86 games and batting .200/.265/.284 with 4 home runs, 23 RBI, and 4 stolen bases. On August 26, 2010, Contreras was released by the Reds organization.

=== Rangers Redipuglia ===
After spending the next 8 seasons out of professional baseball, Contreras returned to action in 2019, playing for the Rangers Redipuglia of the Italian Baseball League (IBL). In 21 games for the team, he hit .302/.375/.442 with 3 home runs, 8 RBI, and 7 stolen bases.

=== Lake Country DockHounds ===
On November 3, 2021, Contreras signed with the Lake Country DockHounds of the American Association of Professional Baseball. Contreras played in 35 games for the DockHounds, hitting .236/.314/.309 with one home run and 8 RBI. He was released by the team on September 23, 2022.

== International career ==
Contreras was selected to the roster for the Colombia national baseball team at the 2015 Pan American Games, 2016 South American Championships, 2017 World Baseball Classic, 2018 Central American and Caribbean Games, 2019 Pan American Games Qualifier, and 2019 Pan American Games.
