= 2018 U-23 Baseball World Cup =

Tournament details
- Country: Colombia
- Dates: October 19 – 28
- Teams: 12
- Defending champions: Japan

Final positions
- Champions: Mexico (1st title)
- Runners-up: Japan
- Third place: Venezuela
- Fourth place: South Korea

Tournament statistics
- Games played: 50
- Attendance: 46,503 (930 per game)

Awards
- MVP: (Japan) Hisanori Yasuda

The 2018 U-23 Baseball World Cup, officially II U-23 Baseball World Cup, is the second edition of the U-23 Baseball World Cup tournament, third since the tournament's inception in 2014 as the 21U Baseball World Cup. The tournament was held at Edgar Rentería Baseball Stadium in Barranquilla and 18 de Junio Baseball Stadium in Montería, Colombia.

Originally the host to the tournament was awarded to Nicaragua and would be held in Managua, but due to 2018–2020 Nicaraguan protests, WBSC subsequently decided to move the tournament to Colombia.

Mexico defeated Japan with a score of 2:1 in the championship game to win the gold medal. Venezuela won the bronze medal by defeating Korea in the third-place game with a score of 4:5.

== Teams ==
Africa

South Africa

Asia

Japan
Chinese Taipei
South Korea

Europe

Netherlands
Czech Republic

Americas

Venezuela
Mexico
Puerto Rico
Dominican Republic

Oceania

Australia

Wild Card

Colombia

== First round ==
=== Group A ===
Pos	Team	Pld	W	L	RF	RA	PCT	GB	Qualification
1	Japan	5	5	0	35	5	1.000	—	Advance to super round
2	Mexico	5	4	1	38	24	.800	1	Advance to super round
3	Chinese Taipei	5	2	3	29	20	.400 (Note: Three-way tie decided by TQB)	3	Advance to super round
4	Netherlands	5	2	3	29	40	.400	3	Advance to consolation round
5	Colombia (H)	5	2	3	33	25	.400	3	Advance to consolation round
6	South Africa	5	0	5	6	56	.000	5	Advance to consolation round

Source: WBSC
(H) Hosts
Notes:

Date	Local time	Road team	Score	Home team	Inn.	Venue	Game duration	Attendance	Boxscore
Oct 19, 2018	10:00	Chinese Taipei	1–2	Mexico		Edgar Rentería Baseball Stadium	2:58	62	Boxscore
Oct 19, 2018	15:00	South Africa	0–13	Japan	F/7	Edgar Rentería Baseball Stadium	1:50	300	Boxscore
Oct 19, 2018	20:00	Netherlands	5–9	Colombia		Edgar Rentería Baseball Stadium	3:27	3,500	Boxscore
Oct 20, 2018	10:00	Japan	3–1	Chinese Taipei		Edgar Rentería Baseball Stadium	2:15	130	Boxscore
Oct 20, 2018	15:00	Mexico	14–7	Netherlands		Edgar Rentería Baseball Stadium	3:34	500	Boxscore
Oct 20, 2018	20:00	Colombia	11–0	South Africa	F/7	Edgar Rentería Baseball Stadium	2:07	3,500	Boxscore
Oct 21, 2018	10:00	Mexico	2–7	Japan		Edgar Rentería Baseball Stadium	3:15	250	Boxscore
Oct 22, 2018	10:00	Netherlands	0–5	Japan		Edgar Rentería Baseball Stadium	2:28	120	Boxscore
Oct 22, 2018	15:00	South Africa	0–12	Chinese Taipei	F/7	Edgar Rentería Baseball Stadium	1:59	250	Boxscore
Oct 22, 2018	20:00	Colombia	6–7	Mexico		Edgar Rentería Baseball Stadium	4:01	4,000	Boxscore
Oct 23, 2018	10:00	Chinese Taipei	9–10	Netherlands	F/10	Edgar Rentería Baseball Stadium	3:06	100	Boxscore
Oct 23, 2018	15:00	South Africa	3–13	Mexico	F/7	Edgar Rentería Baseball Stadium	2:11	102	Boxscore
Oct 23, 2018	20:00	Japan	7–2	Colombia		Edgar Rentería Baseball Stadium	2:58	6,000	Boxscore
Oct 24, 2018	8:00	Netherlands	7–3	South Africa		Edgar Rentería Baseball Stadium	2:59	85	Boxscore
Oct 24, 2018	11:00	Chinese Taipei	6–5	Colombia	F/10	Edgar Rentería Baseball Stadium	3:27	250	Boxscore

=== Group B ===
Pos	Team	Pld	W	L	RF	RA	PCT	GB	Qualification
1	Venezuela	5	5	0	35	10	1.000	—	Advance to super round
2	Dominican Republic	5	3	2	30	26	.600 (Note: Head-to-head result: Dominican Republic 8–2 South Korea)	2	Advance to super round
3	South Korea	5	3	2	38	30	.600	2	Advance to super round
4	Puerto Rico	5	2	3	34	24	.400 (Note: Head-to-head result: Puerto Rico 3–2 Australia)	3	Advance to consolation round
5	Australia	5	2	3	20	27	.400	3	Advance to consolation round
6	Czech Republic	5	0	5	15	55	.000	5	Advance to consolation round

Source: WBSC
Notes:

Date	Local time	Road team	Score	Home team	Inn.	Venue	Game duration	Attendance	Boxscore
Oct 19, 2018	10:00	Australia	2–4	Venezuela		18 de Junio Baseball Stadium	2:40	101	Boxscore
Oct 19, 2018	15:00	Czech Republic	3–14	South Korea	F/7	18 de Junio Baseball Stadium	2:29	200	Boxscore
Oct 19, 2018	20:00	Dominican Republic	9–6	Puerto Rico		18 de Junio Baseball Stadium	3:52	–	Boxscore
Oct 20, 2018	10:00	Australia	5–3	Czech Republic		18 de Junio Baseball Stadium	2:38	114	Boxscore
Oct 20, 2018	15:00	Dominican Republic	8–2	South Korea		18 de Junio Baseball Stadium	3:29	952	Boxscore
Oct 20, 2018	20:00	Venezuela	7–2	Puerto Rico		18 de Junio Baseball Stadium	4:05	1,550	Boxscore
Oct 21, 2018	10:00	Dominican Republic	3–4	Australia		18 de Junio Baseball Stadium	2:52	150	Boxscore
Oct 21, 2018	15:00	Puerto Rico	3–6	South Korea		18 de Junio Baseball Stadium	3:32	987	Boxscore
Oct 21, 2018	20:00	Czech Republic	2–8	Venezuela		18 de Junio Baseball Stadium	3:15	855	Boxscore
Oct 22, 2018	10:00	South Korea	14–7	Australia		18 de Junio Baseball Stadium	3:34	150	Boxscore
Oct 22, 2018	15:00	Venezuela	7–2	Dominican Republic		18 de Junio Baseball Stadium	3:09	800	Boxscore
Oct 22, 2018	20:00	Puerto Rico	20–0	Czech Republic	F/5	18 de Junio Baseball Stadium	1:59	205	Boxscore
Oct 23, 2018	10:00	South Korea	2–9	Venezuela		18 de Junio Baseball Stadium	3:30	700	Boxscore
Oct 23, 2018	15:00	Czech Republic	7–8	Dominican Republic	F/10	18 de Junio Baseball Stadium	3:12	496	Boxscore
Oct 23, 2018	20:00	Puerto Rico	3–2	Australia		18 de Junio Baseball Stadium	2:40	452	Boxscore

== Consolation round ==
Pos	Team	Pld	W	L	RF	RA	PCT	GB
1	Colombia (H)	5	5	0	53	13	1.000	—
2	Puerto Rico	5	4	1	42	13	.800	1
3	Australia	5	3	2	37	31	.600	2
4	Netherlands	5	1	4	21	43	.200 (Note: Three-way tie decided by TQB)	4
5	South Africa	5	1	4	21	36	.200	4
6	Czech Republic	5	1	4	11	49	.200	4

Source: WBSC
(H) Hosts
Notes:

Date	Local time	Road team	Score	Home team	Inn.	Venue	Game duration	Attendance	Boxscore
Oct 25, 2018	10:00	Czech Republic	4–3	Netherlands		18 de Junio Baseball Stadium	2:58	102	Boxscore
Oct 25, 2018	15:00	South Africa	5–7	Puerto Rico		18 de Junio Baseball Stadium	2:50	200	Boxscore
Oct 25, 2018	20:00	Australia	5–18	Colombia	F/7	18 de Junio Baseball Stadium	2:45	2,850	Boxscore
Oct 26, 2018	10:00	South Africa	9–2	Czech Republic		18 de Junio Baseball Stadium	2:46	110	Boxscore
Oct 26, 2018	15:00	Australia	16–3	Netherlands	F/7	18 de Junio Baseball Stadium	2:28	100	Boxscore
Oct 26, 2018	20:00	Colombia	3–1	Puerto Rico	F/11	18 de Junio Baseball Stadium	3:23	2,423	Boxscore
Oct 27, 2018	10:00	South Africa	4–9	Australia		18 de Junio Baseball Stadium	2:56	58	Boxscore
Oct 27, 2018	15:00	Netherlands	3–11	Puerto Rico		18 de Junio Baseball Stadium	2:54	–	Boxscore
Oct 27, 2018	20:00	Czech Republic	2–12	Colombia	F/8	18 de Junio Baseball Stadium	2:17	1,221	Boxscore

== Super round ==
Pos	Team	Pld	W	L	RF	RA	PCT	GB	Qualification
1	Japan	5	5	0	23	8	1.000	—	Advance to final
2	Mexico	5	3	2	19	16	.600 (Note: Head-to-head result: Mexico 10–4 Venezuela)	2	Advance to final
3	Venezuela	5	3	2	27	23	.600	2	Advance to third-place game
4	South Korea	5	2	3	14	24	.400	3	Advance to third-place game
5	Chinese Taipei	5	1	4	10	15	.200 (Note: Head-to-head result: Chinese Taipei 3–1 Dominican Republic)	4	
6	Dominican Republic	5	1	4	12	19	.200	4	

Source: WBSC
Notes:

Date	Local time	Road team	Score	Home team	Inn.	Venue	Game duration	Attendance	Boxscore
Oct 25, 2018	10:00	South Korea	2–3	Japan		Edgar Rentería Baseball Stadium	3:24	200	Boxscore
Oct 25, 2018	15:00	Chinese Taipei	3–1	Dominican Republic	F/10	Edgar Rentería Baseball Stadium	2:53	155	Boxscore
Oct 25, 2018	20:00	Mexico	10–4	Venezuela		Edgar Rentería Baseball Stadium	3:13	1,200	Boxscore
Oct 26, 2018	10:00	Chinese Taipei	2–5	South Korea		Edgar Rentería Baseball Stadium	2:53	150	Boxscore
Oct 26, 2018	15:00	Venezuela	3–6	Japan		Edgar Rentería Baseball Stadium	2:58	150	Boxscore
Oct 26, 2018	18:30	Dominican Republic	1–3	Mexico		Edgar Rentería Baseball Stadium	2:33	850	Boxscore
Oct 27, 2018	10:00	Dominican Republic	0–4	Japan		Edgar Rentería Baseball Stadium	2:10	183	Boxscore
Oct 27, 2018	15:00	Chinese Taipei	3–4	Venezuela		Edgar Rentería Baseball Stadium	2:34	400	Boxscore
Oct 27, 2018	20:00	South Korea	3–2	Mexico		Edgar Rentería Baseball Stadium	2:48	2,100	Boxscore

== Finals ==
=== Third-place game ===
Date	Local time	Road team	Score	Home team	Inn.	Venue	Game duration	Attendance	Boxscore
Oct 28, 2018	13:00	South Korea	4–5	Venezuela		Edgar Rentería Baseball Stadium	2:51	645	Boxscore

=== Championship ===
Date	Local time	Road team	Score	Home team	Inn.	Venue	Game duration	Attendance	Boxscore
Oct 28, 2018	20:00	Mexico	2–1	Japan	F/10	Edgar Rentería Baseball Stadium	3:06	6,500	Boxscore

== Final standings ==
Rk	Team	W	L
1	Mexico	4	2
Lost in Final
2	Japan	5	1
Failed to qualify for the Final
3	Venezuela	4	2
Lost in 3rd Place Game
4	South Korea	2	4
Failed to qualify for the finals
5	Chinese Taipei	3	5
6	Dominican Republic	3	5
Failed to qualify for the super round
7	Colombia	5	3
8	Puerto Rico	4	4
9	Australia	4	4
10	Netherlands	2	6
11	South Africa	1	7
12	Czech Republic	1	7

== U-23 All-World Team ==
The following players were selected to the tournament's All-World Team.

Position	Player
C	(Mexico) Orlando Piña
1B	(Japan) Hisanori Yasuda
2B	(Colombia) Brallan Pérez
3B	(Colombia) Derwin Pomare
SS	(Venezuela) Jorma Rodríguez
OF	(Mexico) Norberto Obeso
OF	(Australia) Ulrich Bojarski
OF	(Colombia) Carlos Vidal
DH	(Venezuela) Leandro Cedeño
P	(Mexico) Francisco Haro
P	(Japan) Kakeru Narita
