= 2024 U-23 Baseball World Cup =

Tournament details
- Country: China
- Dates: September 6 – 15
- Teams: 12
- Defending champions: Japan

Final positions
- Champions: Japan (3rd title)
- Runners-up: Puerto Rico
- Third place: Nicaragua
- Fourth place: China

Tournament statistics
- Games played: 50
- Attendance: 26,823 (536 per game)

Awards
- MVP: (Puerto Rico) Edgardo Villegas

The 2024 U-23 Baseball World Cup, officially V U-23 Baseball World Cup, was the fifth edition of the U-23 Baseball World Cup tournament, sixth since the tournament's inception in 2014 as the 21U Baseball World Cup. The tournament was held at Shaoxing Baseball and Softball Sports Culture Center in Shaoxing, China.

== Venues ==
The tournament was held at Shaoxing Baseball and Softball Sports Culture Center fields 1 and 2. Field 1 hosted the Super Round, the Bronze Medal Game, and the Championship Game while the second field hosted the Placement Round.

== Teams ==
The WBSC World Rankings as of the time of the competition is specified in parentheses.

Africa

South Africa (31)

Americas

Venezuela (5)
Puerto Rico (10)
Colombia (11)
Nicaragua (17)

Asia

Japan (1)
Chinese Taipei (3)
South Korea (6)
China (24)

Europe

Netherlands (7)
Great Britain (18)

Oceania

Australia (15)

== First round ==
=== Group A ===
Pos	Team	Pld	W	L	RF	RA	PCT	GB	Qualification
1	Puerto Rico	5	4	1	29	15	.800 (Note: Head-to-head result: Puerto Rico 6–1 Japan)	—	Advance to super round
2	Japan	5	4	1	18	9	.800	—	Advance to super round
3	China (H)	5	3	2	17	17	.600 (Note: Head-to-head result: Australia 1–4 China)	1	Advance to super round
4	Australia	5	3	2	24	26	.600	1	Advance to placement round
5	Colombia	5	1	4	14	22	.200	3	Advance to placement round
6	Great Britain	5	0	5	23	36	.000	4	Advance to placement round

Source: WBSC
(H) Hosts
Notes:
- All times are China Standard Time (UTC+08:00).

Date	Local time	Road team	Score	Home team	Inn.	Venue	Game duration	Attendance	Boxscore
Sep 6, 2024	10:00	Australia	4 – 2	Colombia	F/7	Field No.1	2:20	1,096	Boxscore
Sep 6, 2024	19:00	China	5 – 3	Great Britain	F/8	Field No.1	2:24	1,761	Boxscore
Sep 6, 2024	19:00	Puerto Rico	6 – 1	Japan	F/7	Field No.2	2:11	120	Boxscore
Sep 7, 2024	14:30	China	0 – 2	Japan	F/7	Field No.1	1:29	3,312	Boxscore
Sep 7, 2024	14:30	Great Britain	4 – 6	Colombia	F/7	Field No.2	2:36	780	Boxscore
Sep 7, 2024	19:00	Puerto Rico	4 – 5	Australia	F/9	Field No.2	3:07	225	Boxscore
Sep 8, 2024	10:00	Colombia	3 – 4	China	F/7	Field No.1	2:15	1,513	Boxscore
Sep 8, 2024	14:30	Great Britain	3 – 8	Puerto Rico	F/7	Field No.2	2:15	140	Boxscore
Sep 8, 2024	19:00	Japan	4 – 1	Australia	F/7	Field No.1	2:21	1,898	Boxscore
Sep 9, 2024	10:00	China	4 – 8	Puerto Rico	F/7	Field No.1	2:32	165	Boxscore
Sep 9, 2024	14:30	Great Britain	12 – 13	Australia	F/7	Field No.2	2:46	106	Boxscore
Sep 9, 2024	19:00	Colombia	1 – 7	Japan	F/7	Field No.1	1:51	110	Boxscore
Sep 10, 2024	10:00	Australia	1 – 4	China	F/7	Field No.1	1:44	263	Boxscore
Sep 10, 2024	14:30	Puerto Rico	3 – 2	Colombia	F/7	Field No.1	2:05	290	Boxscore
Sep 10, 2024	19:00	Japan	4 – 1	Great Britain	F/5	Field No.2	1:35	70	Boxscore

=== Group B ===
Pos	Team	Pld	W	L	RF	RA	PCT	GB	Qualification
1	Nicaragua	5	5	0	23	7	1.000	—	Advance to super round
2	Venezuela	5	3	2	30	19	.600 (Note: Head-to-head result: Venezuela 8–4 South Korea)	2	Advance to super round
3	South Korea	5	3	2	18	18	.600	2	Advance to super round
4	Netherlands	5	2	3	28	22	.400 (Note: Head-to-head result: Netherlands 7–5 Chinese Taipei)	3	Advance to placement round
5	Chinese Taipei	5	2	3	23	14	.400	3	Advance to placement round
6	South Africa	5	0	5	4	46	.000	5	Advance to placement round

Source: WBSC
Notes:
- All times are China Standard Time (UTC+08:00).

Date	Local time	Road team	Score	Home team	Inn.	Venue	Game duration	Attendance	Boxscore
Sep 6, 2024	10:00	South Africa	1 – 8	Nicaragua	F/7	Field No.2	2:03	46	Boxscore
Sep 6, 2024	14:30	South Korea	3 – 1	Chinese Taipei	F/7	Field No.1	2:18	1,000	Boxscore
Sep 6, 2024	14:30	Netherlands	9 – 10	Venezuela	F/7	Field No.2	2:39	137	Boxscore
Sep 7, 2024	10:00	Venezuela	2 – 3	Nicaragua	F/7	Field No.1	2:12	719	Boxscore
Sep 7, 2024	10:00	South Korea	6 – 1	South Africa	F/7	Field No.2	2:17	200	Boxscore
Sep 7, 2024	19:00	Netherlands	7 – 5	Chinese Taipei	F/7	Field No.1	3:06	3,087	Boxscore
Sep 8, 2024	10:00	South Africa	0 – 10	Venezuela	F/6	Field No.2	2:10	41	Boxscore
Sep 8, 2024	14:30	Netherlands	1 – 4	South Korea	F/7	Field No.1	2:40	1,842	Boxscore
Sep 8, 2024	19:00	Nicaragua	4 – 3	Chinese Taipei	F/7	Field No.2	2:42	185	Boxscore
Sep 9, 2024	10:00	Venezuela	8 – 4	South Korea	F/7	Field No.2	3:07	25	Boxscore
Sep 9, 2024	14:30	Nicaragua	1 – 0	Netherlands	F/7	Field No.1	1:54	151	Boxscore
Sep 9, 2024	19:00	Chinese Taipei	11 – 0	South Africa	F/5	Field No.2	1:37	228	Boxscore
Sep 10, 2024	10:00	Nicaragua	7 – 1	South Korea	F/7	Field No.2	2:31	78	Boxscore
Sep 10, 2024	14:30	South Africa	2 – 11	Netherlands	F/7	Field No.2	2:29	51	Boxscore
Sep 10, 2024	19:00	Chinese Taipei	3 – 0	Venezuela	F/7	Field No.1	2:15	271	Boxscore

== Placement round ==
Pos	Team	Pld	W	L	RF	RA	PCT	GB
1	Netherlands	5	4	1	29	14	.800	—
2	Chinese Taipei	5	3	2	31	12	.600 (Note: Head-to-head result: Chinese Taipei 4–3 Australia)	1
3	Australia	5	3	2	31	23	.600	1
4	Colombia	5	2	3	23	28	.400 (Note: Head-to-head result: Great Britain 4–6 Colombia)	2
5	Great Britain	5	2	3	26	29	.400	2
6	South Africa	5	1	4	15	49	.200	3

Source: WBSC
Notes:
- All times are China Standard Time (UTC+08:00).

Date	Local time	Road team	Score	Home team	Inn.	Venue	Game duration	Attendance	Boxscore
Sep 12, 2024	10:00	Great Britain	6 – 8	South Africa	F/7	Field No.2	2:40	25	Boxscore
Sep 12, 2024	14:30	Chinese Taipei	10 – 0	Colombia	F/7	Field No.2	2:28	70	Boxscore
Sep 12, 2024	14:30	Netherlands	3 – 2	Australia	F/7	Field No.1	2:15	271	Boxscore
Sep 13, 2024	10:00	Great Britain	2 – 1	Netherlands	F/7	Field No.2	2:10	33	Boxscore
Sep 13, 2024	10:00	South Africa	3 – 12	Colombia	F/7	Field No.1	2:23	63	Boxscore
Sep 13, 2024	14:30	Chinese Taipei	4 – 3	Australia	F/7	Field No.2	2:39	73	Boxscore
Sep 14, 2024	10:00	Colombia	3 – 7	Netherlands	F/7	Field No.2	2:18	65	Boxscore
Sep 14, 2024	10:00	South Africa	2 – 9	Australia	F/7	Field No.1	2:12	115	Boxscore
Sep 14, 2024	14:30	Great Britain	2 – 1	Chinese Taipei	F/7	Field No.2	2:11	155	Boxscore

== Super round ==
Pos	Team	Pld	W	L	RF	RA	PCT	GB	Qualification
1	Puerto Rico	5	5	0	21	6	1.000	—	Advance to final
2	Japan	5	4	1	19	9	.800	1	Advance to final
3	China (H)	5	2	3	16	22	.400 (Note: Head-to-head result: China 4–0 Nicaragua)	3	Advance to third-place game
4	Nicaragua	5	2	3	11	17	.400	3	Advance to third-place game
5	Venezuela	5	1	4	16	21	.200 (Note: Head-to-head result: Venezuela 8–4 South Korea)	4	
6	South Korea	5	1	4	14	22	.200	4	

Source: WBSC
(H) Hosts
Notes:
- All times are China Standard Time (UTC+08:00).

Date	Local time	Road team	Score	Home team	Inn.	Venue	Game duration	Attendance	Boxscore
Sep 12, 2024	10:00	China	2 – 7	South Korea	F/7	Field No.1	2:06	223	Boxscore
Sep 12, 2024	19:00	Puerto Rico	1 – 0	Nicaragua	F/7	Field No.2	1:44	59	Boxscore
Sep 12, 2024	19:00	Venezuela	1 – 5	Japan	F/7	Field No.1	2:14	356	Boxscore
Sep 13, 2024	14:30	Japan	9 – 1	Nicaragua	F/7	Field No.1	2:14	215	Boxscore
Sep 13, 2024	19:00	South Korea	1 – 3	Puerto Rico	F/7	Field No.2	1:44	27	Boxscore
Sep 13, 2024	19:00	China	6 – 5	Venezuela	F/7	Field No.1	2:11	499	Boxscore
Sep 14, 2024	14:30	Venezuela	0 – 3	Puerto Rico	F/7	Field No.1	1:58	244	Boxscore
Sep 14, 2024	19:00	South Korea	1 – 2	Japan	F/7	Field No.2	2:17	193	Boxscore
Sep 14, 2024	19:00	China	4 – 0	Nicaragua	F/7	Field No.1	2:23	1,404	Boxscore

== Finals ==
=== Third place game ===
Date	Local time	Road team	Score	Home team	Inn.	Venue	Game duration	Attendance	Boxscore
Sep 15, 2024	9:00	Nicaragua	3–1	China	F/7	Field No.2	2:20	1,550	Boxscore

=== Championship ===
Date	Local time	Road team	Score	Home team	Inn.	Venue	Game duration	Attendance	Boxscore
Sep 15, 2024	9:00	Japan	5–0	Puerto Rico	F/7	Field No.1	2:04	1,273	Boxscore

== Final standings ==
Rk	Team	W	L
1st place, gold medalist(s)	Japan	8	1
Lost in Final
2nd place, silver medalist(s)	Puerto Rico	7	2
Won in 3rd-place game
3rd place, bronze medalist(s)	Nicaragua	6	3
Lost in 3rd-place game
4	China	5	4
Failed to qualify for the finals
5	Venezuela	3	5
6	South Korea	4	4
Failed to qualify for the super round
7	Netherlands	4	4
8	Chinese Taipei	4	4
9	Australia	4	4
10	Colombia	2	6
11	Great Britain	2	6
12	South Africa	1	7

2024 U-23 Baseball World Cup

Japan
3rd title

== All-World Team ==
Position	Player
C	(South Korea) Si-ang Kim
1B	(Japan) Ryo Imazato
2B	(Nicaragua) Odlany Matamoros
3B	(Venezuela) Brainer Bonaci
SS	(Netherlands) Gedionne Marlin
OF	(China) Xudong Zhu
OF	(Colombia) Jean Henao
OF	(Puerto Rico) Edgardo Villegas
DH	(Nicaragua) Godwin Bennett
P	(Puerto Rico) Jorhan LaBoy
P	(South Korea) Hyun-seok Choi
