= Baseball at the 2018 Central American and Caribbean Games =

- Venue: Edgar Rentería Baseball Stadium
- Location: Barranquilla
- Dates: 20–29 July
- Nations: 8
- Teams: 8

Medalists
gold medal	Puerto Rico
silver medal	Cuba
bronze medal	Colombia

The baseball competition at the 2018 Central American and Caribbean Games was held at the Edgar Rentería Baseball Stadium in Barranquilla, Colombia from 20 to 29 July 2018.

== Medal summary ==
Event	Gold	Silver	Bronze
Men’s tournament	Puerto Rico; Ángel Alicea; Edgardo Báez; Fernando Cabrera; Luis Cintrón; Fernando Cruz; Yomar Cruz; Jeffrey Domínguez; Bryan Escanio; Adalberto Flores; Jonathan García; Cristian González; Iván Maldonado; Ozzie Martínez; Luis Mateo; Aldo Méndez; Efraín Nieves; Brian Ortiz; Jaime Ortiz; José Rivera; Wilfredo Rodríguez; Ramesis Rosa; Randy Ruiz; Yordan Salva; Anthony Seise	Cuba; Yosvany Alarcón; Freddy Álvarez; Guillermo Avilés; Alexander Ayala; Vladimir Baños; Carlos Benítez; Lázaro Blanco; Erly Casanova; Yoelqui Céspedes; Frederich Cepeda; Ulfrido García; Vladimir García; Raúl González; Yurisbel Gracial; Yulexis La Rosa; Yordan Manduley; Raidel Martínez; Frank Morejón; Yariel Rodríguez; Yordanis Samón; Alain Sánchez; Roel Santos; Juan Torriente; Yoanni Yera	Colombia; Horacio Acosta; Wilmer Alvarado; Diover Ávila; Kendy Batista; Sneider Batista; Cristian Cano; Hernando Chiquillo; Randy Consuegra; Efraín Contreras; Jhonatan Escudero; Jhonatan Lozada; Ernesto Frieri; Gerson Jiménez; Yeizer Marrugo; Álvaro Noriega; Dewin Pérez; Dewin Pomaré; Yoandry Portal; Jesús Posso; Ronald Ramírez; Reynaldo Rodríguez; Yesid Salazar; Luis Yendis; Carlos Willoughby

== Standings ==
Rk	Team	W	L
1st place, gold medalist(s)	Puerto Rico	5	2
2nd place, silver medalist(s)	Cuba	5	2
3rd place, bronze medalist(s)	Colombia (H)	4	3
4	Mexico	3	4
5	Nicaragua	3	4
6	Venezuela	3	4
7	Panama	3	4
8	Dominican Republic	2	5

Team qualified to the 2019 Pan American Games
Team qualified to the 2019 Pan American Games Qualifier

== Results ==
20 July 2018; 10:00	Dominican Republic	5–4	Panama	Edgar Rentería Baseball Stadium
20 July 2018; 10:00		Boxscore		Edgar Rentería Baseball Stadium

20 July 2018; 15:00	Cuba	5–0	Mexico	Edgar Rentería Baseball Stadium
20 July 2018; 15:00		Boxscore		Edgar Rentería Baseball Stadium

20 July 2018; 20:00	Nicaragua	1–3	Colombia	Edgar Rentería Baseball Stadium
20 July 2018; 20:00		Boxscore		Edgar Rentería Baseball Stadium

21 July 2018; 10:00	Venezuela	3–5	Puerto Rico	Edgar Rentería Baseball Stadium
21 July 2018; 10:00		Boxscore		Edgar Rentería Baseball Stadium

21 July 2018; 15:00	Panama	0–1	Cuba	Edgar Rentería Baseball Stadium
21 July 2018; 15:00		Boxscore		Edgar Rentería Baseball Stadium

21 July 2018; 20:00	Mexico	1–9	Colombia	Edgar Rentería Baseball Stadium
21 July 2018; 20:00		Boxscore		Edgar Rentería Baseball Stadium

22 July 2018; 10:00	Nicaragua	0–5	Mexico	Edgar Rentería Baseball Stadium
22 July 2018; 10:00		Boxscore		Edgar Rentería Baseball Stadium

22 July 2018; 15:00	Dominican Republic	0–4	Venezuela	Edgar Rentería Baseball Stadium
22 July 2018; 15:00		Boxscore		Edgar Rentería Baseball Stadium

22 July 2018; 20:00	Cuba	1–8	Puerto Rico	Edgar Rentería Baseball Stadium
22 July 2018; 20:00		Boxscore		Edgar Rentería Baseball Stadium

23 July 2018; 10:00	Venezuela	4–5 (F/10)	Nicaragua	Edgar Rentería Baseball Stadium
23 July 2018; 10:00		Boxscore		Edgar Rentería Baseball Stadium

23 July 2018; 15:00	Puerto Rico	4–1	Dominican Republic	Edgar Rentería Baseball Stadium
23 July 2018; 15:00		Boxscore		Edgar Rentería Baseball Stadium

23 July 2018; 20:00	Colombia	1–8	Panama	Edgar Rentería Baseball Stadium
23 July 2018; 20:00		Boxscore		Edgar Rentería Baseball Stadium

24 July 2018; 15:00	Mexico	1–7	Puerto Rico	Edgar Rentería Baseball Stadium
24 July 2018; 15:00		Boxscore		Edgar Rentería Baseball Stadium

24 July 2018; 20:00	Venezuela	2–1	Cuba	Edgar Rentería Baseball Stadium
24 July 2018; 20:00		Boxscore		Edgar Rentería Baseball Stadium

25 July 2018; 10:00	Panama	5–2	Mexico	Edgar Rentería Baseball Stadium
25 July 2018; 10:00		Boxscore		Edgar Rentería Baseball Stadium

25 July 2018; 15:00	Dominican Republic	3–2	Nicaragua	Edgar Rentería Baseball Stadium
25 July 2018; 15:00		Boxscore		Edgar Rentería Baseball Stadium

25 July 2018; 20:00	Colombia	7–3	Venezuela	Edgar Rentería Baseball Stadium
25 July 2018; 20:00		Boxscore		Edgar Rentería Baseball Stadium

26 July 2018; 10:00	Panama	2–6	Nicaragua	Edgar Rentería Baseball Stadium
26 July 2018; 10:00		Boxscore		Edgar Rentería Baseball Stadium

26 July 2018; 15:00	Puerto Rico	2–1	Colombia	Edgar Rentería Baseball Stadium
26 July 2018; 15:00		Boxscore		Edgar Rentería Baseball Stadium

26 July 2018; 20:00	Cuba	13–1 (F/8)	Dominican Republic	Edgar Rentería Baseball Stadium
26 July 2018; 20:00		Boxscore		Edgar Rentería Baseball Stadium

27 July 2018; 10:00	Nicaragua	3–11	Cuba	Edgar Rentería Baseball Stadium
27 July 2018; 10:00		Boxscore		Edgar Rentería Baseball Stadium

27 July 2018; 15:00	Puerto Rico	2–5	Panama	Edgar Rentería Baseball Stadium
27 July 2018; 15:00		Boxscore		Edgar Rentería Baseball Stadium

27 July 2018; 20:00	Venezuela	0–3	Mexico	Edgar Rentería Baseball Stadium
27 July 2018; 20:00		Boxscore		Edgar Rentería Baseball Stadium

28 July 2018; 10:00	Nicaragua	10–9 (F/10)	Puerto Rico	Edgar Rentería Baseball Stadium
28 July 2018; 10:00		Boxscore		Edgar Rentería Baseball Stadium

28 July 2018; 15:00	Panama	2–4	Venezuela	Edgar Rentería Baseball Stadium
28 July 2018; 15:00		Boxscore		Edgar Rentería Baseball Stadium

28 July 2018; 20:00	Colombia	5–3	Dominican Republic	Edgar Rentería Baseball Stadium
28 July 2018; 20:00		Boxscore		Edgar Rentería Baseball Stadium

29 July 2018; 15:00	Mexico	3–2	Dominican Republic	Edgar Rentería Baseball Stadium
29 July 2018; 15:00		Boxscore		Edgar Rentería Baseball Stadium

29 July 2018; 20:00	Cuba	3–1	Colombia	Edgar Rentería Baseball Stadium
29 July 2018; 20:00		Boxscore		Edgar Rentería Baseball Stadium
