= 2016 U-23 Baseball World Cup =

Tournament details
- Country: Mexico
- Dates: October 28 - November 6
- Teams: 12
- Defending champions: Chinese Taipei

Final positions
- Champions: Japan (1st title)
- Runners-up: Australia
- Third place: South Korea
- Fourth place: Panama

Tournament statistics
- Games played: 50
- Attendance: 27,797 (556 per game)

Awards
- MVP: (Japan) Yusuke Masago

The 2016 U-23 World Baseball Cup was the second edition of the U-23 Baseball World Cup since its inception in 2014 as the U-21 Baseball World Cup. The competition took place in Mexico between Oct. 28 and Nov. 6, 2016. A total of 50 games were played in three host cities: Monterrey, Saltillo, and Cadereyta.

In the gold medal game, Japan defeated Australia with the score of 10:3. Korea defeated Panama with the score of 5:3 to win the bronze medal.

== Venues ==
Monterrey, Saltillo, and Cadereyta are the three cities where games were played. In Monterrey, games were played at the 27,000-seat Estadio de Beisbol Monterrey, home of Sultannes Monterrey of the Mexican Baseball League. In Saltillo, games were played at Estadio Francisco I. Madero, home of the Saraperos de Saltillo of the Mexican Baseball League. In Caderetya, games were played at Unidad Deportiva Alfonso Martinez Dominguez.

== Teams ==
Twelve nations competed in the tournament, from 6 continents:

World No. 1 Japan, No. 3 Korea, No. 4 Chinese Taipei, No. 7 Venezuela, No. 8 Mexico, No. 13 Australia, No. 14 Czech Republic, No. 15 Panama, No. 18 Nicaragua, No. 27 Argentina, No. 33 Austria, and No. 36 South Africa.

== Group stage ==
Two groups of six teams played in a round-robin format, with the top three teams from each group advancing to the Super Round. The bottom three teams from each group went to the consolation round. The rankings of teams in each group were determined by the win-loss record of all games played. If two or more teams had the same win-loss record, rankings were determined as follows:

1. win-loss record in games between the tied teams;
2. team's quality balance (TQB) and game results between teams tied;
3. earned runs team's quality balance (ER-TQB);
4. highest batting average in games between the teams tied;
5. a coin flip.

Pool A	Pool B
South Korea	Japan
Venezuela	Chinese Taipei
Mexico	Australia
Czech Republic	Nicaragua
Panama	Argentina
South Africa	Austria

== Opening round ==
=== Pool A ===
Pos	Team	Pld	W	L	RF	RA	RD	PCT	GB	Qualification
1	Panama	5	5	0	45	12	+33	1.000	—	Advance to Super Round
2	South Korea	5	4	1	40	12	+28	.800	1	Advance to Super Round
3	Mexico	5	3	2	35	13	+22	.600	2	Advance to Super Round
4	Venezuela	5	2	3	32	35	−3	.400	3	Advance to Consolation round
5	Czech Republic	5	1	4	32	54	−22	.200	4	Advance to Consolation round
6	South Africa	5	0	5	9	67	−58	.000	5	Advance to Consolation round

Source: WBSC

=== Pool B ===
Pos	Team	Pld	W	L	RF	RA	RD	PCT	GB	Qualification
1	Japan	5	5	0	58	8	+50	1.000	—	Advance to Super Round
2	Australia	5	4	1	39	26	+13	.800	1	Advance to Super Round
3	Nicaragua	5	3	2	37	17	+20	.600	2	Advance to Super Round
4	Chinese Taipei	5	2	3	28	33	−5	.400	3	Advance to Consolation round
5	Argentina	5	1	4	17	44	−27	.200	4	Advance to Consolation round
6	Austria	5	0	5	4	55	−51	.000	5	Advance to Consolation round

Source: WBSC

== Super Round ==
In the Super Round, each the three teams that advanced from Group A play one game against each of the three teams that advanced from Group B.

At the end of this round, four teams will qualify for the finals, based on the results of five total games: the two First Round games between the three qualified teams, plus the three games of the Super Round.

The first and second place teams will play in the Gold Medal Game, the third and fourth place teams will play in the Bronze Medal Game.

Pos	Team	Pld	W	L	RF	RA	RD	PCT	GB	Qualification
1	Japan	5	4	1	24	9	+15	.800	—	Advance to gold medal game
2	Australia	5	3	2	33	42	−9	.600	1	Advance to gold medal game
3	Panama	5	3	2	18	24	−6	.600	1	Advance to bronze medal game
4	South Korea	5	2	3	31	25	+6	.400	2	Advance to bronze medal game
5	Mexico	5	2	3	26	24	+2	.400	2	
6	Nicaragua	5	1	4	27	35	−8	.200	3	

Source: WBSC

== Awards ==
Awards	Player
Most Valuable Player	(Japan) Yusuke Masago
Outstanding Defensive Player	(South Korea) Tae-jin Kim

All-Tournament Team
Position	Player
Starting Pitcher	(South Korea) Ji-seob Lim
Relief Pitcher	(Australia) Josh Guyer
Catcher	(Mexico) Carlos Mendivil
First Baseman	(Australia) Connor Macdonald
Second Baseman	(South Korea) Tae-jin Kim
Third Baseman	(Chinese Taipei) Tung-Hua Yueh
Shortstop	(Australia) Jacob Younis
Outfielder	(Japan) Yusuke Masago
Outfielder	(South Korea) Byeong-wuk Lim
Outfielder	(Japan) Kengo Takeda
Designated Hitter	(Australia) Guy Edmonds
