= Eri Matsui =

Japanese fashion designer

- 松居 エリ
- Born: 1952 (age 73–74); Aichi Prefecture, Japan
- Occupation: fashion designer

Eri Matsui (松居 エリ; 1952 in Aichi Prefecture) is a Japanese fashion designer known for mathematically inspired designs.

== Early life and education ==
Eri Matsui was born in 1952 in Aichi Prefecture. She studied fine arts and graphic design. Matsui began designing her clothing in Chicago after her husband was transferred there. She attended William Rainey Harper College where she found her interest in fashion design.

== Career ==
Matsui spent six years in Chicago, working and designing clothes. After, she returned to Japan where she started her own company. Matsui had studios in Tokyo and Paris. Her designs and clothing showed up in Tokyo Collection in the mid-1990s.

Eri Matsui's 2000 collection featured many designs created using the Mathematica software program. In the spring of 2006 she made news by designing a wedding dress intended to look good in zero-g and sponsored a design competition for clothing to be worn under such conditions, the Hyper Space Couture Design Contest. "I hope 'fashion in space' makes everybody happy," she told The Sunday Telegraph in 2006. In 2011 she collaborated with twelve pastry chefs to make headwear to match her dresses for her Tokyo Sweets Collection.

== Sources ==
- Design for the First Astrobride The Guardian, May 3, 2006.
- On the Runway: Spacewear Meant to Dazzle, Even in Zero Gravity by Dennis Overbye. The New York Times May 16, 2006.
