= Estadio Édgar Rentería =

Colombian baseball stadium

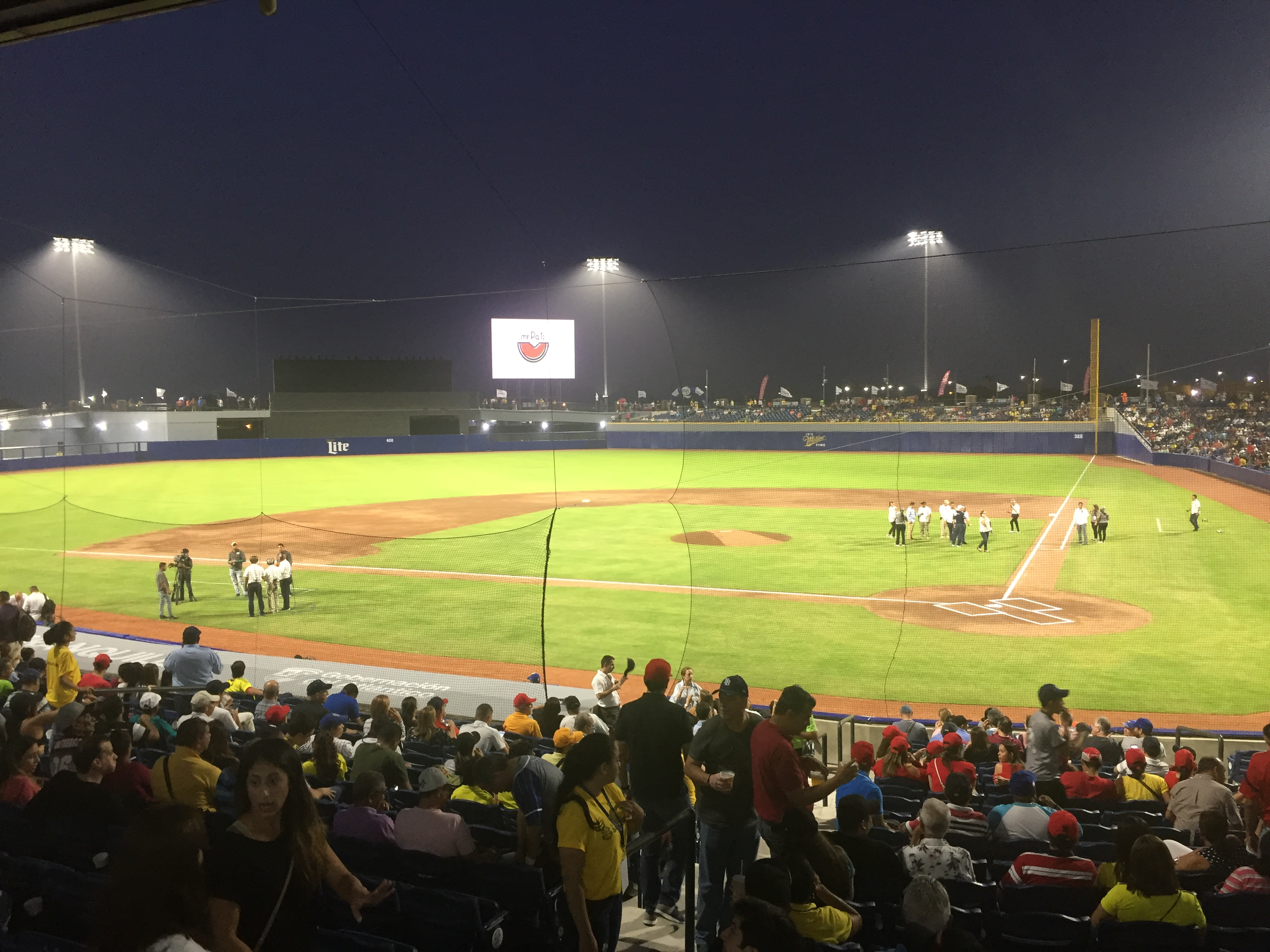
- Interactive map of Estadio Édgar Rentería
- Address: Calle 54 Número 40-224, Barranquilla, Colombia
- Location: Barranquilla, Atlántico Department, Colombia
- Coordinates: 10.99495°N 74.784497°W
- Owner: City of Barranquilla
- Capacity: 12,000
- Surface: Artificial turf
- Field size: Left Field Line – 325 ft (99 m); Center Field – 400 ft (120 m); Right Field Line – 325 ft (99 m)

Construction
- Built: 2016-2018
- Opened: May 1, 2018
- Cost: 45 billion COP

Tenants
- Caimanes de Barranquilla; Leones de Barranquilla

Estadio Édgar Rentería is a baseball stadium located in Barranquilla, Colombia, and the current home of the Caimanes de Barranquilla. It has a capacity of 12,000 and opened in 2018.

The ballpark opened in 2018 with an international friendly tournament, featuring the national teams of Colombia, Dominican Republic, Puerto Rico, and Venezuela. The stadium was host to the 2018 Central American and Caribbean Games and the 2018 U-23 Baseball World Cup.

The stadium was built on the site of the former Estadio Tomás Arrieta, which was demolished in 2016. In 2010, Barranquilla Mayor Alejandro Char Chaljub announced that it would be named after Édgar Rentería, who had been named World Series MVP for the championship-winning San Francisco Giants. Initially, the stadium was expected to cost around 26 billion pesos, but eventually ballooned to 45 billion pesos. During its construction, Caimanes temporarily relocated to Santa Cruz de Lorica, in the nearby Córdoba Department.
