= Koji Matsui =

Koji Matsui may refer to:

- Koji Matsui (politician) (松井 孝治, born 1960), Japanese politician
- Koji Matsui (handballer) (松井 幸嗣, born 1957), Japanese handball player
