= Masato Matsui =

Japanese baseball player (born 1987)

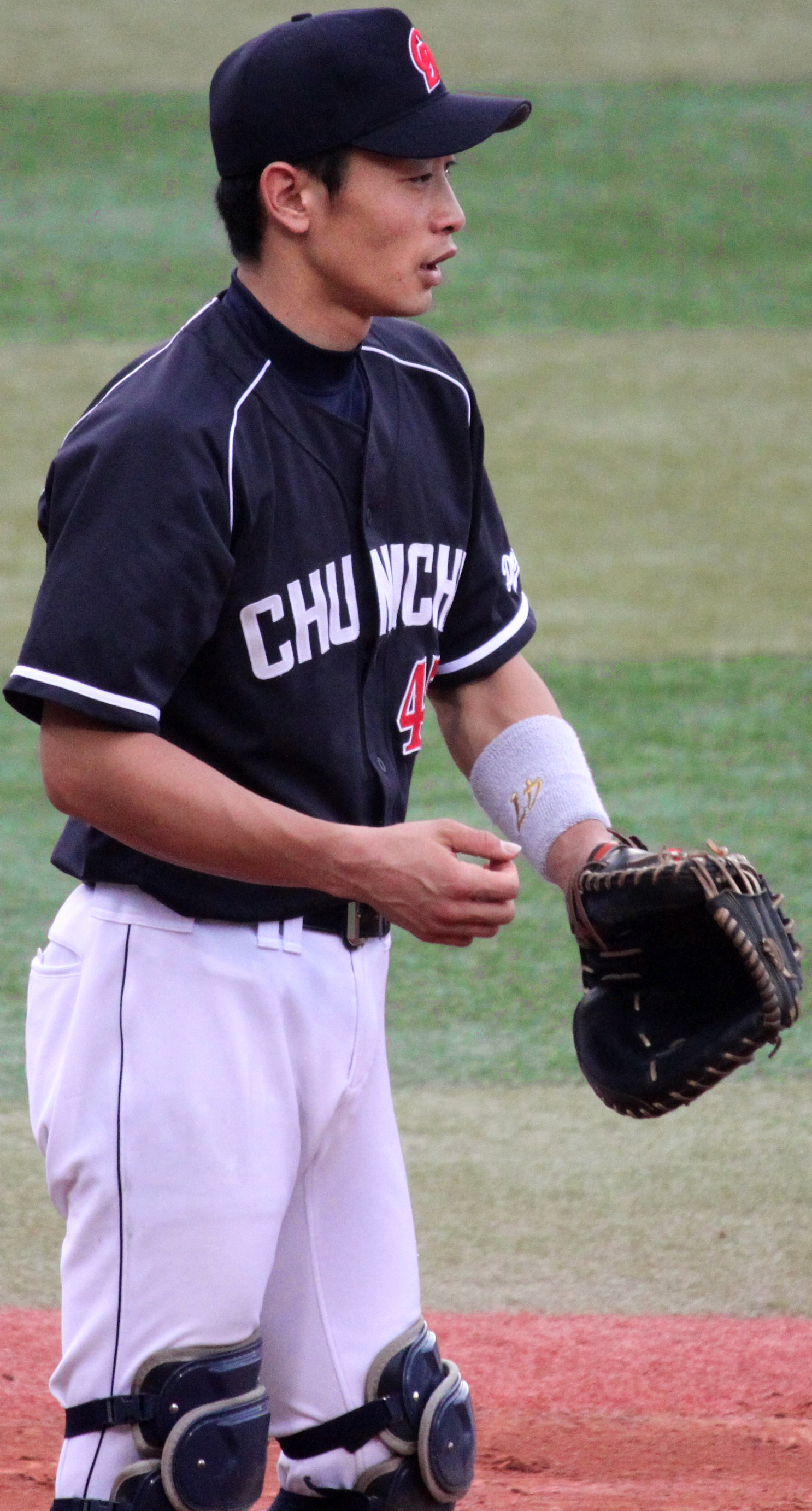

Orix Buffaloes – No. 97
- Catcher / Coach
- Born: November 19, 1987 (age 38)
- Batted: Left Threw: Right

NPB debut
- March 28, 2010, for the Chunichi Dragons

Last NPB appearance
- August 14, 2022, for the Orix Buffaloes

NPB statistics (through 2022 season)
- Batting average: .192
- Home runs: 6
- Hits: 175
- RBI: 61
- Stolen bases: 6
- Stats at Baseball Reference

Teams
- As player: Chunichi Dragons (2010–2019); Orix Buffaloes (2019–2022); As coach: Orix Buffaloes (2025–present)

Career highlights and awards
- Japan Series champion (2022)

Masato Matsui (松井 雅人, born November 19, 1987, in Japan) is a former Japanese professional baseball catcher. He previously played for the Chunichi Dragons and Orix Buffaloes.
