= Yusuke Matsui =

Japanese baseball player (born 1987)

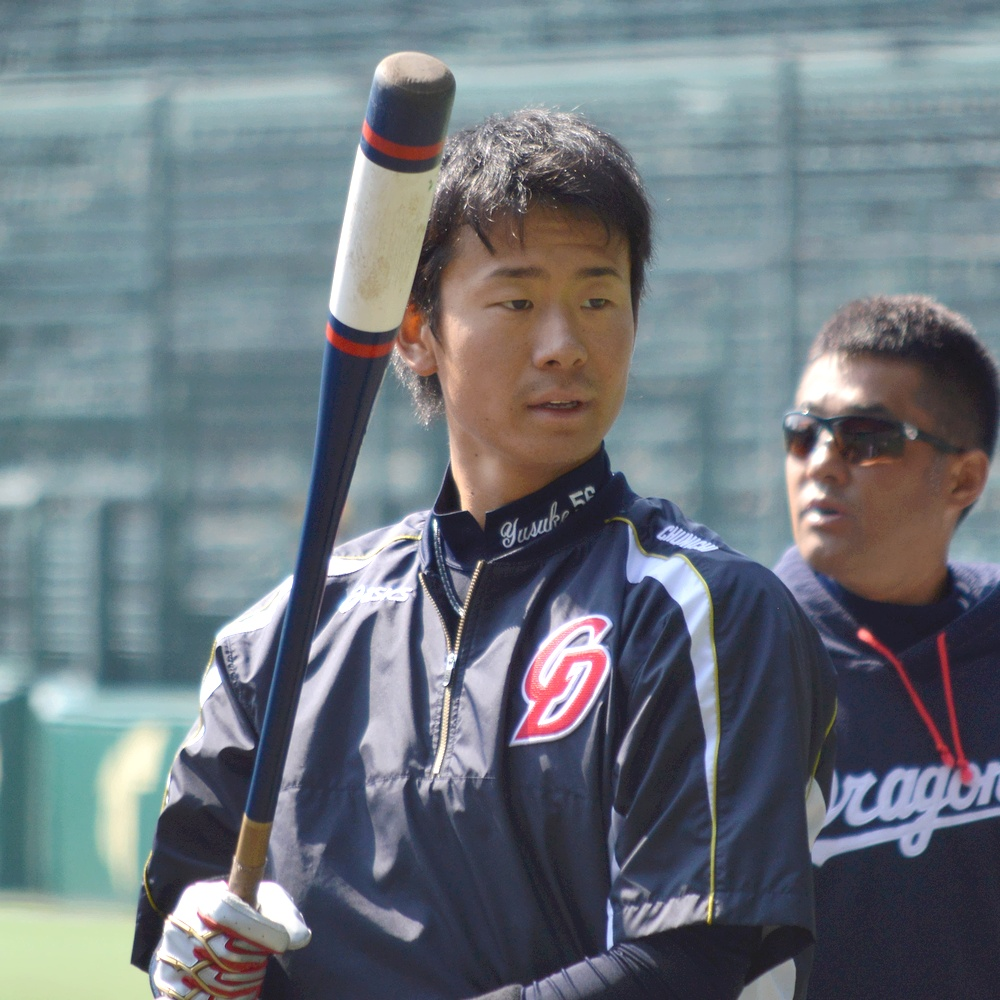

Orix Buffaloes – No. 70
- Outfielder / Coach
- Born: July 10, 1987 (age 38); Hirano-ku, Osaka
- Batted: Right Threw: Right

NPB debut
- March 26, 2010, for the Chunichi Dragons

Last NPB appearance
- October 31, 2020, for the Orix Buffaloes

NPB statistics (through 2020 season)
- Batting average: .233
- Home runs: 9
- Hits: 140
- RBI: 49
- Stolen bases: 1
- Stats at Baseball Reference

Teams
- As player: Chunichi Dragons (2010–2019); Orix Buffaloes (2019–2020); As coach: Orix Buffaloes (2021–present)

Yusuke Matsui (松井 佑介, born July 10, 1987, in Japan) is a Japanese former professional baseball outfielder who is currently coach for the Orix Buffaloes of Nippon Professional Baseball (NPB). He has played in NPB for the Chunichi Dragons and Buffaloes.

== Career ==
Chunichi Dragons selected Matsui with the forth selection in the 2009 NPB draft.

On March 26, 2010, Matsui made his NPB debut.

On December 2, 2020, he become a free agent. On December 2, 2020, he become a batting coach for Buffaloes.
