= U-23 Baseball World Cup =

Baseball world championship

- Current season, competition or edition: 2026 U-23 Baseball World Cup
- Formerly: 21U Baseball World Cup (2014)
- Sport: Baseball
- Founded: 2014
- No. of teams: 12
- Continent: International
- Most recent champion: Venezuela (2nd title)
- Most titles: Japan (3 titles)
- Website: 2024 U-23 Baseball World Cup

The U-23 Baseball World Cup is a biennial, professional-level, National Team, baseball world championship of the World Baseball Softball Confederation (WBSC), replacing Baseball World Cup.

The inaugural tournament was held in November 2014, in Taichung, Taiwan, as the 21U Baseball World Cup, with each team made of 21-year-old and younger players but allowed for six players to be 23-year-old and younger. Starting with the 2016 edition—in Monterrey, Mexico—the tournament has been expanded to permit nations to select players up to 23 years old for their entire rosters. Players must also possess valid passports of the nations they are representing, in line with Olympic standards. The U-23 Baseball World Cup is the third-most-important international baseball tournament in terms of distribution of world ranking points, following the Premier12 and the World Baseball Classic.

The rosters of national teams that participated in the tournament included professional players from clubs affiliated to the Australian Baseball League, Chinese Professional Baseball League, Korea Baseball Organization, Major League Baseball, Mexican Baseball League, Nicaraguan Professional Baseball League, and Nippon Professional Baseball.

The United States does not participate, as USA Baseball does not have an under-23 national team.

== Classification ==
With the approved format of 12 national teams, the WBSC has distributed the continental quotas as follows:

- WBSC Africa: 1 spots
- WBSC Americas: 4 spots
- WBSC Asia: 3 spots
- WBSC Europe: 2 spots
- WBSC Oceania: 1 spots
- Wild cards: 1 spots (including hosts if necessary)

The participants will be determined through the continental championships.

== Results ==
Ed.	Years	Hosts	Finalists			Semi-finalists			Teams
Ed.	Years	Hosts	Champions	Score	Runners-up	3rd place	Score	4th place	Teams
21U Baseball World Cup
1	2014; Details	(Taiwan); Taichung	Chinese Taipei	9–0	Japan	South Korea	10–4	Nicaragua	11
U-23 Baseball World Cup
1	2016; Details	(Mexico); Monterrey	Japan	10–3	Australia	South Korea	5–3	Panama	12
2	2018; Details	(Colombia); Barranquilla	Mexico	2–1	Japan	Venezuela	5–4	South Korea	12
3	2020; Details (Note: Originally scheduled to be held in 2020, but due to the COVID-19 pandemic, postponed to September 2021.)	(Mexico); Ciudad Obregon; Hermosillo	Venezuela	4–0	Mexico	Colombia	5–3	Cuba	12
4	2022; Details	(Taiwan); Taipei, Taichung, Yunlin	Japan	3–0	South Korea	Chinese Taipei	3–1	Mexico	12
5	2024; Details	(China); Shaoxing	Japan	5–0	Puerto Rico	Nicaragua	3–1	China	12
6	2026; Details	(Nicaragua); León, Managua, Masaya	Venezuela	5–0	Australia	Japan	8–4	Chinese Taipei	12

== Medal table ==
Rank	Nation	Gold	Silver	Bronze	Total
1	Japan	3	2	1	6
2	Venezuela	2	0	1	3
3	Mexico	1	1	0	2
4	Chinese Taipei	1	0	1	2
5	Australia	0	2	0	2
6	South Korea	0	1	2	3
7	Puerto Rico	0	1	0	1
8	Colombia	0	0	1	1
8	Nicaragua	0	0	1	1
Totals (9 entries)		7	7	7	21

== Participating nations ==
Host country

Nation	2014	2016	2018	2021	2022	2024	2026	Years
Argentina		9						1
Australia	6	2nd place, silver medalist(s)	9		6	9	2nd place, silver medalist(s)	6
Austria		12						1
China						4		1
Chinese Taipei	1st place, gold medalist(s)	7	5	6	3rd place, bronze medalist(s)	8	4	7
Colombia			7	3rd place, bronze medalist(s)	5	10		4
Cuba				4	10		7	3
Czech Republic	5	10	12	12			10	5
Dominican Republic			6	9				2
Great Britain						11	8	2
Germany				11	11			2
Italy	7							1
Japan	2nd place, silver medalist(s)	1st place, gold medalist(s)	2nd place, silver medalist(s)		1st place, gold medalist(s)	1st place, gold medalist(s)	3rd place, bronze medalist(s)	6
Mexico	11	5	1st place, gold medalist(s)	2nd place, silver medalist(s)	4			5
Netherlands	9		10	10	8	7		5
New Zealand	10							1
Nicaragua	4	6		7		3rd place, bronze medalist(s)	11	5
Panama		4		5			9	3
Puerto Rico			8		9	2nd place, silver medalist(s)	5	4
South Africa		11	11		12	12	12	5
South Korea	3rd place, bronze medalist(s)	3rd place, bronze medalist(s)	4	8	2nd place, silver medalist(s)	6	6	7
Venezuela	8	8	3rd place, bronze medalist(s)	1st place, gold medalist(s)	7	5	1st place, gold medalist(s)	7
Nations	11	12	12	12	12	12	12	–

== See also ==
- Baseball awards § World
- Baseball at the Summer World University Games
- World University Baseball Championship
