= 2001 Cincinnati Reds season =

2001 Cincinnati Reds
- League: National League
- Division: Central
- Ballpark: Cinergy Field
- City: Cincinnati
- Record: 66–96 (.407)
- Divisional place: 5th
- Owners: Carl Lindner
- General managers: Jim Bowden
- Managers: Bob Boone
- Television: FSN Ohio (George Grande, Chris Welsh)
- Radio: WLW (Marty Brennaman, Joe Nuxhall)
- Stats: ESPN.com; Baseball Reference

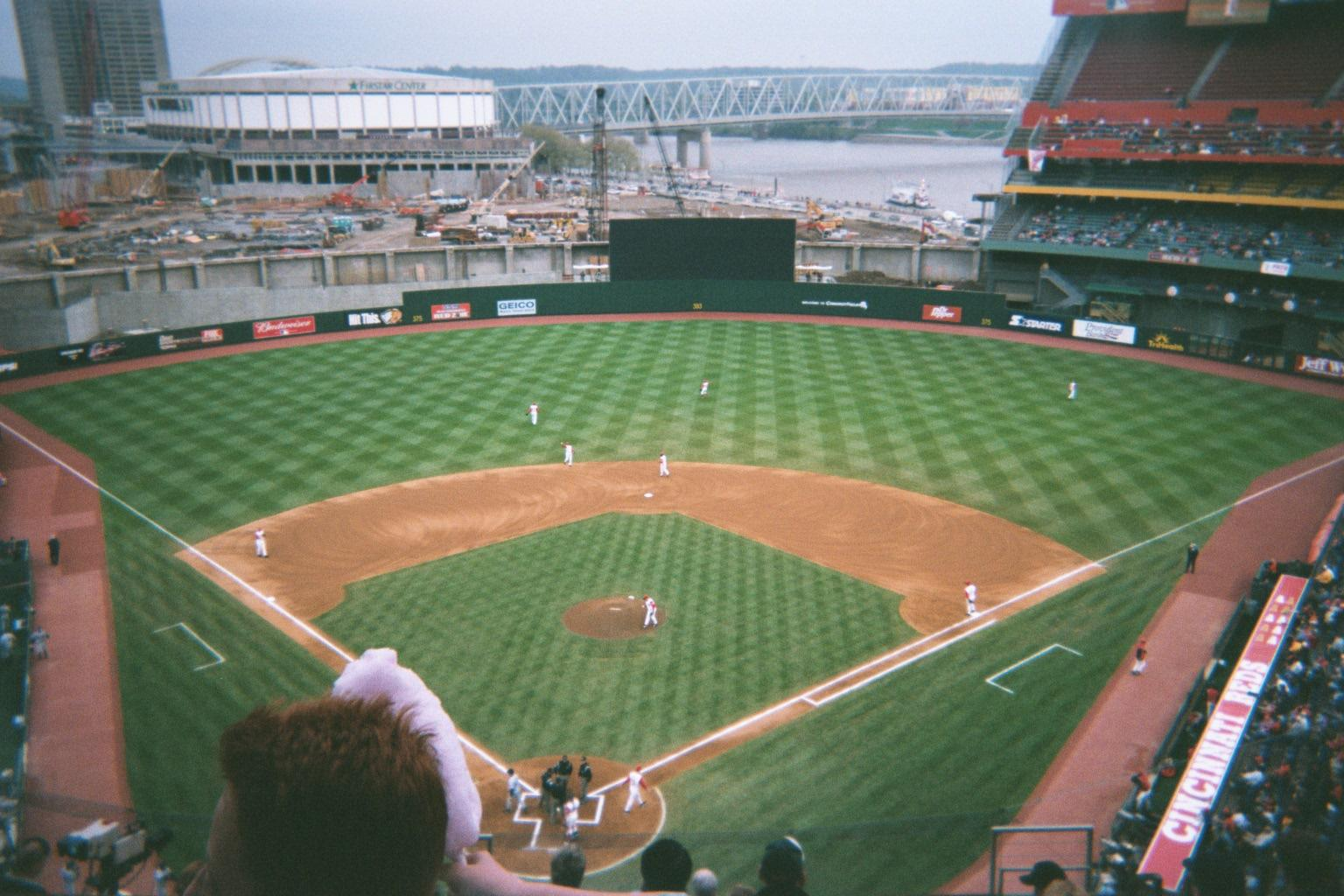
The Reds playing host to the New York Mets during an April 2001 game at Cinergy Field.

The 2001 Cincinnati Reds season was the 132nd season for the franchise in Major League Baseball. It consisted of the Cincinnati Reds attempting to win the National League Central. The Reds were managed by Bob Boone.

== Offseason ==
- November 16, 2000: Chris Stynes was traded by the Reds to the Boston Red Sox for Michael Coleman and Donnie Sadler.
- March 21, 2001: Drew Henson and Michael Coleman were traded by the Reds to the New York Yankees for Wily Mo Peña.

== Regular season ==
- May 8, 2001: Randy Johnson of the Arizona Diamondbacks struck out 20 Cincinnati Reds batters, but left the game after nine innings with a no-decision tied at 1-1. The Reds scored two runs in the top of the 11th inning but the Diamondbacks scored three runs in the bottom of the inning to win, 4-3.

=== Season standings ===
NL Central
Team	W	L	Pct.	GB	Home	Road
Houston Astros	93	69	.574	—	44‍–‍37	49‍–‍32
St. Louis Cardinals	93	69	.574	—	54‍–‍28	39‍–‍41
Chicago Cubs	88	74	.543	5	48‍–‍33	40‍–‍41
Milwaukee Brewers	68	94	.420	25	36‍–‍45	32‍–‍49
Cincinnati Reds	66	96	.407	27	27‍–‍54	39‍–‍42
Pittsburgh Pirates	62	100	.383	31	38‍–‍43	24‍–‍57

==== Record vs. opponents ====
2001 National League record Source: MLB Standings Grid – 2001
Team	AZ	ATL	CHC	CIN	COL	FLA	HOU	LAD	MIL	MON	NYM	PHI	PIT	SD	SF	STL	AL
Arizona	—	5–2	6–3	5–1	13–6	4–2	2–4	10–9	3–3	3–3	3–3	3–4	4–2	12–7	10–9	2–4	7–8
Atlanta	2–5	—	4–2	4–2	4–2	9–10	3–3	2–5	3–3	13–6	10–9	10–9	5–1	3–3	4–2	3–3	9–9
Chicago	3–6	2–4	—	13–4	3–3	3–3	8–9	4–2	8–9	3–3	4–2	4–2	10–6	2–4	3–3	9–8	9–6
Cincinnati	1–5	2–4	4–13	—	3–6	4–2	6–11	4–2	6–10	4–2	4–2	2–4	9–8	2–4	4–2	7–10	4–11
Colorado	6–13	2–4	3–3	6–3	—	4–2	2–4	8–11	5–1	3–4	4–3	2–4	2–4	9–10	9–10	6–3	2–10
Florida	2–4	10–9	3–3	2–4	2–4	—	3–3	2–5	4–2	12–7	7–12	5–14	4–2	3–4	2–4	3–3	12–6
Houston	4–2	3–3	9–8	11–6	4–2	3–3	—	2–4	12–5	6–0	3–3	3–3	9–8	3–6	3–3	9–7	9–6
Los Angeles	9–10	5–2	2–4	2–4	11–8	5–2	4–2	—	5–1	2–4	2–4	3–3	7–2	9–10	11–8	3–3	6–9
Milwaukee	3–3	3–3	9–8	10–6	1–5	2–4	5–12	1–5	—	4–2	3–3	3–3	6–11	1–5	5–4	7–10	5–10
Montreal	3–3	6–13	3–3	2–4	4–3	7–12	0–6	4–2	2–4	—	8–11	9–10	5–1	3–3	2–5	2–4	8–10
New York	3–3	9–10	2–4	2–4	3–4	12–7	3–3	4–2	3–3	11–8	—	11–8	4–2	1–5	3–4	1–5	10–8
Philadelphia	4–3	9–10	2–4	4–2	4–2	14–5	3–3	3–3	3–3	10–9	8–11	—	5–1	5–2	3–3	2–4	7–11
Pittsburgh	2–4	1–5	6–10	8–9	4–2	2–4	8–9	2–7	11–6	1–5	2–4	1–5	—	2–4	1–5	3–14	8–7
San Diego	7–12	3–3	4–2	4–2	10–9	4–3	6–3	10–9	5–1	3–3	5–1	2–5	4–2	—	5–14	1–5	6–9
San Francisco	9–10	2–4	3–3	2–4	10–9	4–2	3–3	8–11	4–5	5–2	4–3	3–3	5–1	14–5	—	4–2	10–5
St. Louis	4–2	3–3	8–9	10–7	3–6	3–3	7–9	3–3	10–7	4–2	5–1	4–2	14–3	5–1	2–4	—	8–7

=== Notable transactions ===
- June 23, 2001: Scott Service was signed as a free agent by the Reds.
- July 1, 2001: José Rijo was signed as a free agent by the Reds.
- July 19, 2001: Alex Ochoa was traded by the Reds to the Colorado Rockies for Robin Jennings and Todd Walker.

=== Roster ===
2001 Cincinnati Reds
Roster
Pitchers: 29 José Acevedo; 39 Justin Atchley; 29 Rob Bell; 53 Jim Brower; 59 Lance Davis; 45 Elmer Dessens; 54 Jared Fernández; 43 Osvaldo Fernández; 32 Danny Graves; 50 Joey Hamilton; 38 Pete Harnisch; 51 Scott MacRae; 52 Héctor Mercado; 57 Chris Nichting; 60 Chris Piersoll; 50 Brian Reith; 41 Chris Reitsma; 49 Dennys Reyes; 46 John Riedling; 27 José Rijo; 58 Frankie Rodriguez; 56 Scott Sullivan; 48 Scott Williamson; 37 Scott Winchester; 51 Mark Wohlers	Catchers: 23 Jason LaRue; 37 Corky Miller; 31 Kelly Stinnett; Infielders: 17 Aaron Boone; 21 Sean Casey; 12 Juan Castro; 36 D. T. Cromer; 6 Wilton Guerrero; 11 Barry Larkin; 4 Brandon Larson; 3 Pokey Reese; 15 Donnie Sadler; 54 Bill Selby; 2 Todd Walker	Outfielders: 22 Brady Clark; 44 Adam Dunn; 39 Raúl González; 30 Ken Griffey Jr.; 26 Robin Jennings; 7 Alex Ochoa; 28 Rubén Rivera; 2 Deion Sanders; 34 Michael Tucker; 25 Dmitri Young; Other batters: 34 Calvin Pickering	Manager: 9 Bob Boone; Coaches: 19 Bill Doran (first base); 10 Tim Foli (bench); 33 Ken Griffey, Sr. (hitting); 35 Don Gullett (pitching); 47 Tom Hume (bullpen); 16 Ron Oester (third base)

== Player stats ==
=== Batting ===
==== Starters by position ====
Note: Pos = Position; G = Games played; AB = At bats; H = Hits; Avg. = Batting average; HR = Home runs; RBI = Runs batted in

Pos	Player	G	AB	H	Avg.	HR	RBI
C	Jason LaRue	121	364	86	.236	12	43
1B	Sean Casey	145	533	165	.310	13	89
2B	Todd Walker	66	261	77	.295	5	32
SS	Pokey Reese	133	428	96	.224	9	40
3B	Aaron Boone	103	381	112	.294	14	62
LF	Dmitri Young	142	540	163	.302	21	69
CF	Ken Griffey Jr.	111	364	104	.286	22	65
RF	Alex Ochoa	90	349	101	.289	7	35

==== Other batters ====
Note: G = Games played; AB = At bats; H = Hits; Avg. = Batting average; HR = Home runs; RBI = Runs batted in

Player	G	AB	H	Avg.	HR	RBI
Rubén Rivera	117	263	67	.255	10	34
Adam Dunn	66	244	64	.262	19	43
Juan Castro	96	242	54	.223	3	13
Michael Tucker	86	231	56	.242	7	30
Kelly Stinnett	63	187	48	.257	9	25
Barry Larkin	45	156	40	.256	2	17
Wilton Guerrero	60	142	48	.338	1	8
Brady Clark	89	129	34	.264	6	18
Bill Selby	36	92	21	.228	2	12
Donnie Sadler	39	84	17	.202	1	3
Robin Jennings	27	77	22	.286	3	14
Deion Sanders	32	75	13	.173	1	4
D.T. Cromer	50	57	16	.281	5	12
Corky Miller	17	49	9	.184	3	7
Brandon Larson	14	33	4	.121	0	1
Raúl González	11	14	3	.214	0	0
Calvin Pickering	4	4	1	.250	0	1

=== Pitching ===
==== Starting pitchers ====
Note: G = Games pitched; IP = Innings pitched; W = Wins; L = Losses; ERA = Earned run average; SO = Strikeouts

Player	G	IP	W	L	ERA	SO
Elmer Dessens	34	205.0	10	14	4.48	128
Chris Reitsma	36	182.0	7	15	5.29	96
Lance Davis	20	106.1	8	4	4.74	53
José Acevedo	18	96.0	5	7	5.44	68
Rob Bell	9	44.1	0	5	5.48	33
Brian Reith	9	40.1	0	7	7.81	22
Pete Harnisch	7	35.1	1	3	6.37	17
Joey Hamilton	4	17.1	1	2	6.23	10

==== Other pitchers ====
Note; G = Games pitched; IP = Innings pitched; W = Wins; L = Losses; ERA = Earned run average; SO = Strikeouts

Player	G	IP	W	L	ERA	SO
Jim Brower	46	129.1	7	10	3.97	94
Osvaldo Fernández	20	79.1	5	6	6.92	35
Jared Fernández	5	12.1	0	1	4.38	5

==== Relief pitchers ====
Note: G = Games pitched; W = Wins; L = Losses; SV = Saves; ERA = Earned run average; SO = Strikeouts

Player	G	W	L	SV	ERA	SO
Danny Graves	66	6	5	32	4.15	49
Scott Sullivan	79	7	1	0	3.31	82
Héctor Mercado	56	3	2	0	4.08	59
Chris Nichting	36	0	3	1	4.46	33
Dennys Reyes	35	2	6	0	4.92	52
Mark Wohlers	30	3	1	0	3.94	21
John Riedling	29	1	1	1	2.41	23
Scott MacRae	24	0	1	0	4.02	18
Justin Atchley	15	0	0	0	6.10	8
José Rijo	13	0	0	0	2.12	12
Scott Winchester	12	0	2	0	4.50	9
Chris Piersoll	11	0	0	0	2.38	7
Frank Rodriguez	7	0	0	0	11.42	9
Scott Williamson	2	0	0	0	0.00	0

== Farm system ==
Level	Team	League	Manager
AAA	Louisville RiverBats	International League	Dave Miley
AA	Chattanooga Lookouts	Southern League	Phillip Wellman
A	Mudville Nine	California League	Dave Oliver
A	Dayton Dragons	Midwest League	Donnie Scott
Rookie	GCL Reds	Gulf Coast League	Edgar Caceres
Rookie	Billings Mustangs	Pioneer League	Rick Burleson

LEAGUE CHAMPIONS: Louisville, Billings
