= 2001 Atlanta Braves season =

2001 Atlanta Braves
- National League East champions
- League: National League
- Division: East
- Ballpark: Turner Field
- City: Atlanta
- Record: 88–74 (.543)
- Divisional place: 1st
- Owners: AOL Time Warner
- General managers: John Schuerholz
- Managers: Bobby Cox
- Television: TBS Superstation; Turner South (Pete Van Wieren, Skip Caray, Don Sutton, Joe Simpson); Fox Sports South (Tom Paciorek, Bob Rathbun)
- Radio: WSB (AM) (Pete Van Wieren, Skip Caray, Don Sutton, Joe Simpson); WATB (Marcelo Godoy, Jose Manuel Flores)

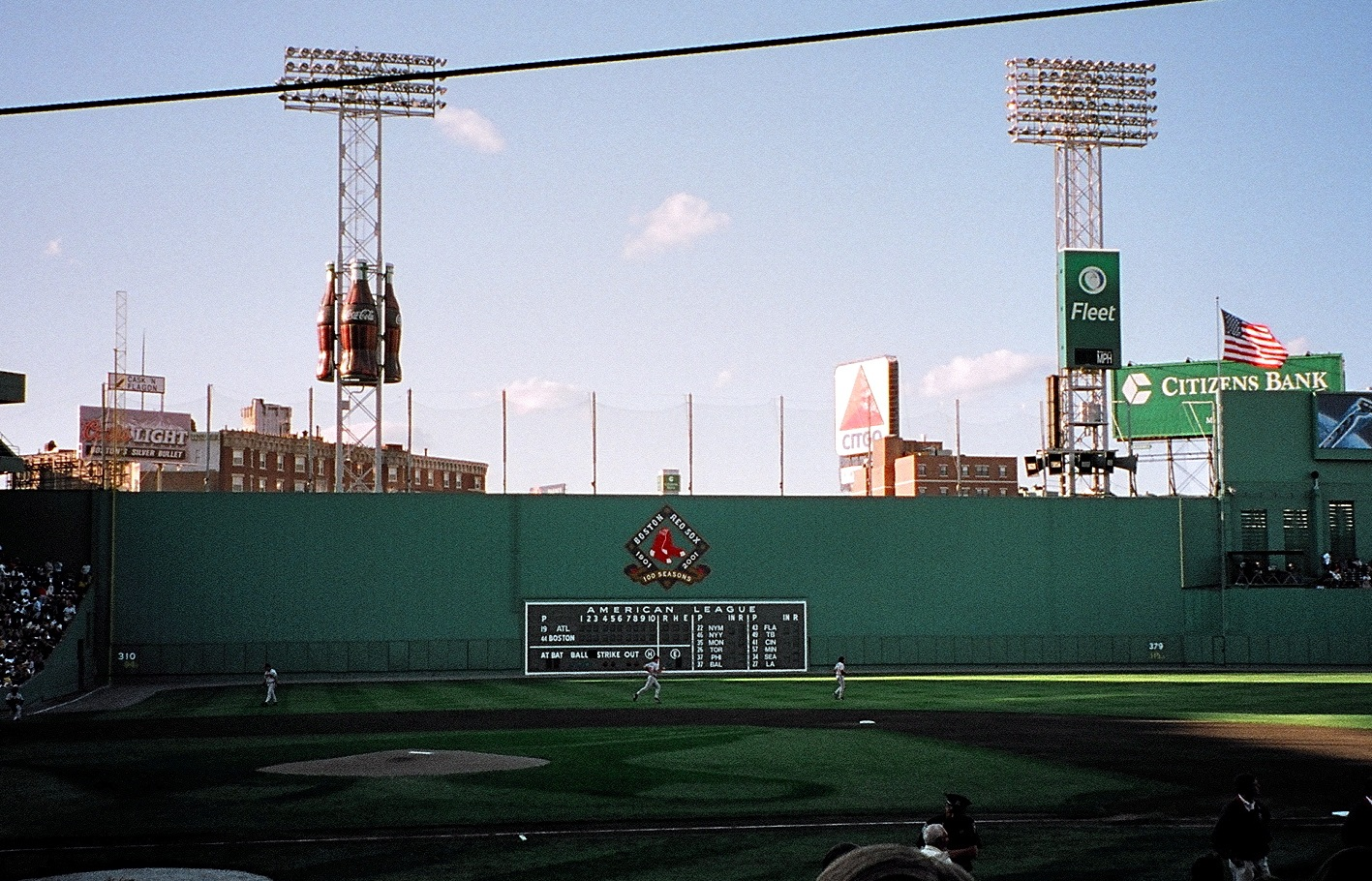
The Braves playing against the Boston Red Sox during a 2001 away game at Fenway Park.

The 2001 Atlanta Braves season marked the franchise's 36th season in Atlanta and 131st overall. The Braves won their seventh consecutive division title. The season saw the team finish first in the NL East Division with an 88–74 record – the worst among playoff teams in 2001, and also the worst record for the Braves since the 1994 strike-reduced season (meaning the worst record through their run of 11 consecutive division titles starting in 1995). Atlanta finished the season with just a 2-game division lead over the Philadelphia Phillies.

The Braves swept the favored Houston Astros in the NLDS before losing to the eventual World Series champion Arizona Diamondbacks in the NLCS 4–1, in which Randy Johnson and Curt Schilling notably dominated Atlanta's offense.

== Offseason ==
- October 31, 2000: Bobby Bonilla was released by the Atlanta Braves.
- December 13, 2000: Rico Brogna was signed as a free agent with the Atlanta Braves.
- January 26, 2001: Steve Avery was signed as a free agent with the Atlanta Braves.
- March 30, 2001: Steve Avery was released by the Atlanta Braves.

== Regular season ==
The Braves played the Mets in the first game in New York after the attacks on the World Trade Center on September 11. The game was played on September 21, and it was a 3–2 New York Mets victory over the Atlanta Braves.

=== Opening Day starters ===
- Rafael Furcal
- Tom Glavine
- Wes Helms
- Andruw Jones
- Chipper Jones
- Brian Jordan
- Javy López
- B. J. Surhoff
- Quilvio Veras

=== Season standings ===
NL East
Team	W	L	Pct.	GB	Home	Road
Atlanta Braves	88	74	.543	—	40‍–‍41	48‍–‍33
Philadelphia Phillies	86	76	.531	2	47‍–‍34	39‍–‍42
New York Mets	82	80	.506	6	44‍–‍37	38‍–‍43
Florida Marlins	76	86	.469	12	46‍–‍34	30‍–‍52
Montreal Expos	68	94	.420	20	34‍–‍47	34‍–‍47

==== Record vs. opponents ====
2001 National League record Source: MLB Standings Grid – 2001
Team	AZ	ATL	CHC	CIN	COL	FLA	HOU	LAD	MIL	MON	NYM	PHI	PIT	SD	SF	STL	AL
Arizona	—	5–2	6–3	5–1	13–6	4–2	2–4	10–9	3–3	3–3	3–3	3–4	4–2	12–7	10–9	2–4	7–8
Atlanta	2–5	—	4–2	4–2	4–2	9–10	3–3	2–5	3–3	13–6	10–9	10–9	5–1	3–3	4–2	3–3	9–9
Chicago	3–6	2–4	—	13–4	3–3	3–3	8–9	4–2	8–9	3–3	4–2	4–2	10–6	2–4	3–3	9–8	9–6
Cincinnati	1–5	2–4	4–13	—	3–6	4–2	6–11	4–2	6–10	4–2	4–2	2–4	9–8	2–4	4–2	7–10	4–11
Colorado	6–13	2–4	3–3	6–3	—	4–2	2–4	8–11	5–1	3–4	4–3	2–4	2–4	9–10	9–10	6–3	2–10
Florida	2–4	10–9	3–3	2–4	2–4	—	3–3	2–5	4–2	12–7	7–12	5–14	4–2	3–4	2–4	3–3	12–6
Houston	4–2	3–3	9–8	11–6	4–2	3–3	—	2–4	12–5	6–0	3–3	3–3	9–8	3–6	3–3	9–7	9–6
Los Angeles	9–10	5–2	2–4	2–4	11–8	5–2	4–2	—	5–1	2–4	2–4	3–3	7–2	9–10	11–8	3–3	6–9
Milwaukee	3–3	3–3	9–8	10–6	1–5	2–4	5–12	1–5	—	4–2	3–3	3–3	6–11	1–5	5–4	7–10	5–10
Montreal	3–3	6–13	3–3	2–4	4–3	7–12	0–6	4–2	2–4	—	8–11	9–10	5–1	3–3	2–5	2–4	8–10
New York	3–3	9–10	2–4	2–4	3–4	12–7	3–3	4–2	3–3	11–8	—	11–8	4–2	1–5	3–4	1–5	10–8
Philadelphia	4–3	9–10	2–4	4–2	4–2	14–5	3–3	3–3	3–3	10–9	8–11	—	5–1	5–2	3–3	2–4	7–11
Pittsburgh	2–4	1–5	6–10	8–9	4–2	2–4	8–9	2–7	11–6	1–5	2–4	1–5	—	2–4	1–5	3–14	8–7
San Diego	7–12	3–3	4–2	4–2	10–9	4–3	6–3	10–9	5–1	3–3	5–1	2–5	4–2	—	5–14	1–5	6–9
San Francisco	9–10	2–4	3–3	2–4	10–9	4–2	3–3	8–11	4–5	5–2	4–3	3–3	5–1	14–5	—	4–2	10–5
St. Louis	4–2	3–3	8–9	10–7	3–6	3–3	7–9	3–3	10–7	4–2	5–1	4–2	14–3	5–1	2–4	—	8–7

=== Notable transactions ===
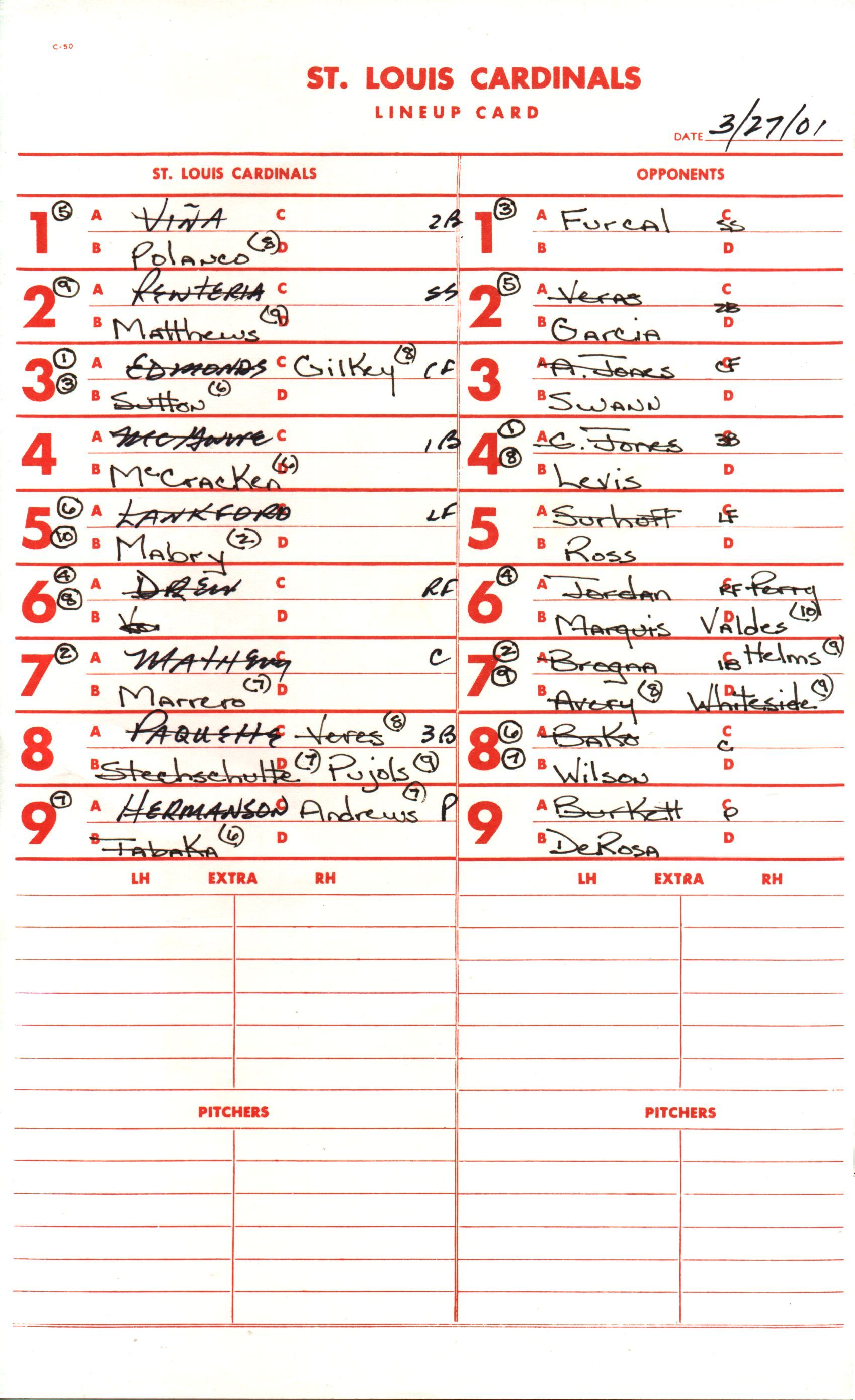
A lineup card for a 2001 spring training game between the Atlanta Braves and St. Louis Cardinals.

- May 10, 2001: Aaron Small was signed as a free agent with the Atlanta Braves.
- June 22, 2001: John Rocker was traded by the Atlanta Braves with Troy Cameron (minors) to the Cleveland Indians for Steve Karsay and Steve Reed.
- July 5, 2001: Ken Caminiti was signed as a free agent with the Atlanta Braves.
- July 31, 2001: Rey Sánchez was traded by the Kansas City Royals to the Atlanta Braves for Brad Voyles (minors) and Alejandro Machado (minors).
- August 7, 2001: Quilvio Veras was released by the Atlanta Braves.
- August 31, 2001: Julio Franco was purchased by the Atlanta Braves from the Mexico City Tigers (Mexican).

=== Roster ===
2001 Atlanta Braves
**Roster**
**Pitchers**: 19 John Burkett; 32 José Cabrera; 47 Tom Glavine; 20 Steve Karsay; 46 Kerry Ligtenberg; 31 Greg Maddux; 38 Jason Marquis; 34 Kevin Millwood; 50 Trey Moore; 27 Damian Moss; 40 Joe Nelson; 45 Odalis Pérez; 36 Steve Reed; 37 Mike Remlinger; 49 John Rocker; 48 Rudy Seánez; 51 Chris Seelbach; 36 Joe Slusarski; 29 John Smoltz; 49,64 Scott Sobkowiak; 43 Tim Spooneybarger; 43 Marc Valdes; 48 Matt Whiteside	**Catchers**: 9 Paul Bako; 8 Javy López; 12 Eddie Pérez; 50 Steve Torrealba; **Infielders**: 11 Kurt Abbott; 30 Wilson Betemit; 2 Rico Brogna; 11 Ken Caminiti; 16 Mark DeRosa; 28,4 Julio Franco; 1 Rafael Furcal; 22 Jesse Garcia; 24 Marcus Giles; 18 Wes Helms; 10 Chipper Jones; 7 Keith Lockhart; 2 Rey Sánchez; 4 Quilvio Veras	**Outfielders**: 40 Cory Aldridge; 23 Bernard Gilkey; 25 Andruw Jones; 33 Brian Jordan; 14 Dave Martinez; 15 B. J. Surhoff	**Manager**: 6 Bobby Cox; **Coaches**: 39 Pat Corrales (bench); 52 Bobby Dews (bullpen); 17 Glenn Hubbard (1st base); 54 Leo Mazzone (pitching); 28 Merv Rettenmund (hitting); 5 Ned Yost (3rd base)

=== Game log ===
2001 Game Log: 88–74 (Home: 40–41; Away: 48–33)
April: 12–14 (Home: 5–4; Away: 7–10)

#	Date	Opponent	Score	Win	Loss	Save	Attendance	Record
1	April 2	@ Reds	10–4	**Valdes** (1–0)	Reyes (0–1)	—	41,901	1–0
2	April 3	Mets	4–6 (10)	Cook (1–0)	**Ligtenberg** (0–1)	Benitez (1)	42,117	1–1
3	April 4	Mets	3–2	**Rocker** (1–0)	Wall (0–1)	—	27,924	2–1
4	April 5	Mets	1–7	Reed (1–0)	**Perez** (0–1)	—	34,219	2–2
5	April 6	@ Marlins	7–5	**Maddux** (1–0)	Grilli (0–1)	**Rocker** (1)	15,857	3–2
6	April 7	@ Marlins	0–8	Dempster (1–0)	**Burkett** (0–1)	—	27,224	3–3
7	April 8	@ Marlins	1–6	Clement (1–0)	**Glavine** (0–1)	—	20,880	3–4
8	April 9	@ Mets	4–9	Appier (1–0)	**Millwood** (0–1)	—	53,640	3–5
9	April 11	@ Mets	2–0	**Maddux** (2–0)	Reed (1–1)	**Rocker** (2)	36,048	4–5
10	April 12	@ Mets	0–1 (10)	Benitez (1–0)	**Ligtenberg** (0–2)	—	27,694	4–6
11	April 13	Phillies	4–2	**Glavine** (1–1)	Wolf (0–2)	**Rocker** (3)	31,017	5–6
12	April 14	Phillies	1–2	Daal (1–0)	**Millwood** (0–2)	Mesa (4)	35,979	5–7
13	April 15	Phillies	3–0	**Perez** (1–1)	Person (1–1)	**Rocker** (4)	24,472	6–7
14	April 16	Marlins	4–3	**Rocker** (2–0)	Miceli (0–2)	—	24,015	7–7
15	April 17	Marlins	2–3	Nunez (1–1)	**Burkett** (0–2)	Alfonseca (2)	27,522	7–8
16	April 18	Marlins	1–0	**Glavine** (2–1)	Dempster (2–1)	**Rocker** (5)	30,233	8–8
17	April 20	@ Phillies	3–8	Gomes (2–0)	**Perez** (1–2)	—	16,245	8–9
18	April 21	@ Phillies	1–4	Person (2–1)	**Maddux** (2–1)	—	17,123	8–10
19	April 22	@ Phillies	2–3	Telemaco (2–0)	**Burkett** (0–3)	Gomes (1)	26,756	8–11
20	April 23	@ Astros	9–7	**Glavine** (3–1)	Dotel (1–2)	—	29,122	9–11
21	April 24	@ Astros	6–11	Reynolds (1–1)	**Perez** (1–3)	Bottenfield (1)	29,216	9–12
22	April 25	@ Astros	11–3	**Millwood** (1–2)	Elarton (3–2)	—	31,223	10–12
23	April 26	@ Diamondbacks	6–13	Ellis (3–0)	**Maddux** (2–2)	—	27,362	10–13
24	April 27	@ Diamondbacks	9–0	**Burkett** (1–3)	Reynoso (1–4)	—	32,663	11–13
25	April 28	@ Diamondbacks	3–1	**Glavine** (4–1)	Johnson (3–3)	**Rocker** (6)	45,264	12–13
26	April 29	@ Diamondbacks	5–7	Sabel (1–0)	**Perez** (1–4)	Brohawn (1)	34,356	12–14

May: 14–12 (Home: 11–7; Away: 3–5)

#	Date	Opponent	Score	Win	Loss	Save	Attendance	Record
27	May 1	Brewers	3–5	Haynes (3–2)	**Millwood** (1–3)	Leskanic (3)	24,922	12–15
28	May 2	Brewers	1–0	**Maddux** (3–2)	Rigdon (2–1)	—	24,802	13–15
29	May 3	Brewers	0–5	Sheets (2–2)	**Burkett** (1–4)	—	26,411	13–16
30	May 4	Cardinals	2–4	Hermanson (2–1)	**Glavine** (4–2)	Veres (3)	40,981	13–17
31	May 5	Cardinals	6–5	**Remlinger** (1–0)	Timlin (1–1)	**Rocker** (7)	48,543	14–17
32	May 6	Cardinals	7–5	**Cabrera** (1–0)	Stechschulte (0–2)	**Rocker** (8)	44,144	15–17
33	May 8	@ Padres	1–7	Jarvis (2–3)	**Maddux** (3–3)	—	20,494	15–18
34	May 9	@ Padres	3–0	**Burkett** (2–4)	Jones (1–4)	**Rocker** (9)	18,902	16–18
35	May 10	@ Padres	5–6	Myers (1–1)	**Remlinger** (1–1)	Hoffman (5)	20,056	16–19
36	May 11	@ Dodgers	5–1	**Perez** (2–4)	Gagne (1–2)	—	54,343	17–19
37	May 12	@ Dodgers	0–1	Shaw (1–1)	**Whiteside** (0–1)	—	53,006	17–20
38	May 13	@ Dodgers	1–3	Prokopec (4–1)	**Maddux** (3–4)	Shaw (13)	37,152	17–21
39	May 15	Rockies	5–3	**Remlinger** (2–1)	Hampton (5–1)	**Rocker** (10)	28,921	18–21
40	May 16	Rockies	6–4	**Cabrera** (2–0)	Wasdin (2–1)	**Rocker** (11)	32,461	19–21
41	May 17	Rockies	3–8	Neagle (4–1)	**Smoltz** (0–1)	—	31,221	19–22
42	May 18	Giants	6–5	**Cabrera** (3–0)	Nen (2–1)	—	34,429	20–22
43	May 19	Giants	3–6	Worrell (1–0)	**Cabrera** (3–1)	Nen (10)	42,789	20–23
44	May 20	Giants	11–6	**Ligtenberg** (1–2)	Hernandez (3–6)	—	33,696	21–23
45	May 21	@ Marlins	5–3	**Glavine** (5–2)	Clement (2–4)	**Rocker** (12)	12,169	22–23
46	May 22	@ Marlins	2–3	Smith (3–0)	**Smoltz** (0–2)	Alfonseca (10)	12,014	22–24
–	May 23	@ Marlins	Postponed (rain); rescheduled for September 27					
47	May 25	Pirates	1–0	**Maddux** (4–4)	Ritchie (0–6)	—	28,120	23–24
48	May 26	Pirates	9–3	**Burkett** (3–4)	Wengert (0–2)	—	40,788	24–24
49	May 27	Pirates	3–6	Arroyo (3–4)	**Glavine** (5–3)	Williams (8)	35,728	24–25
50	May 28	Expos	5–3 (8)	**Smoltz** (1–2)	Yoshii (1–2)	**Rocker** (13)	24,904	25–25
51	May 29	Expos	7–4	**Perez** (3–4)	Blank (0–1)	**Rocker** (14)	26,818	26–25
52	May 30	Expos	3–4	Vazquez (5–5)	**Maddux** (4–5)	Urbina (8)	27,936	26–26

June: 19–9 (Home: 4–6; Away: 15–3)

#	Date	Opponent	Score	Win	Loss	Save	Attendance	Record
53	June 1	@ Pirates	5–1	**Burkett** (4–4)	Ritchie (0–7)	—	34,230	27–26
–	June 2	@ Pirates	Postponed (rain); rescheduled for June 3					
54	June 3 (1)	@ Pirates	11–7	**Glavine** (6–3)	Olivares (2–6)	—	N/A	28–26
55	June 3 (2)	@ Pirates	8–3	**Smoltz** (2–2)	Anderson (3–5)	—	36,924	29–26
56	June 5	@ Expos	3–1	**Maddux** (5–5)	Vazquez (5–6)	**Rocker** (15)	7,017	30–26
57	June 6	@ Expos	2–0	**Burkett** (5–4)	Irabu (0–1)	**Rocker** (16)	5,102	31–26
58	June 7	@ Expos	4–3 (11)	**Marquis** (1–0)	Strickland (0–3)	**Ligtenberg** (1)	4,575	32–26
59	June 8	@ Yankees	4–7	Pettitte (7–4)	**Glavine** (6–4)	Rivera (18)	50,090	32–27
60	June 9	@ Yankees	10–6	**Cabrera** (4–1)	Choate (2–1)	**Rocker** (17)	55,107	33–27
61	June 10	@ Yankees	4–1	**Maddux** (6–5)	Mussina (5–7)	**Rocker** (18)	41,392	34–27
62	June 11	@ Blue Jays	4–9	File (2–1)	**Burkett** (5–5)	—	16,885	34–28
63	June 12	@ Blue Jays	3–0	**Perez** (4–4)	Parris (3–5)	**Rocker** (19)	20,448	35–28
64	June 13	@ Blue Jays	5–12	Hamilton (3–3)	**Glavine** (6–5)	—	19,901	35–29
65	June 15	Red Sox	5–9 (10)	Beck (2–3)	**Cabrera** (4–2)	—	48,469	35–30
66	June 16	Red Sox	8–0	**Burkett** (6–5)	Nomo (6–4)	—	50,524	36–30
67	June 17	Red Sox	3–4	Castillo (7–4)	**Perez** (4–5)	Lowe (10)	45,362	36–31
68	June 18	Marlins	6–7	Looper (2–2)	**Rocker** (2–1)	Alfonseca (15)	28,719	36–32
69	June 19	Marlins	2–12	Smith (4–2)	**Marquis** (1–1)	—	31,759	36–33
70	June 20	Marlins	7–2	**Maddux** (7–5)	Burnett (5–3)	—	28,867	37–33
71	June 21	Marlins	2–3	Looper (3–2)	**Rocker** (2–2)	Alfonseca (16)	33,359	37–34
72	June 22	@ Mets	10–1	**Perez** (5–5)	R. Reed (7–3)	—	40,129	38–34
73	June 23	@ Mets	9–3 (11)	**S. Reed** (2–1)	White (1–1)	—	42,736	39–34
74	June 24	@ Mets	8–4	**Marquis** (2–1)	Trachsel (1–9)	—	47,181	40–34
75	June 25	@ Phillies	9–4	**Maddux** (8–5)	Daal (8–2)	—	22,439	41–34
76	June 26	@ Phillies	4–1 (11)	**Remlinger** (3–1)	Gomes (4–2)	**Cabrera** (1)	23,747	42–34
77	June 27	@ Phillies	10–4	**Perez** (6–5)	Wolf (4–9)	—	31,991	43–34
78	June 28	Mets	6–2 (10)	**S. Reed** (3–1)	Benitez (3–3)	—	40,055	44–34
79	June 29	Mets	1–3	Trachsel (2–9)	**Marquis** (2–2)	Benitez (15)	48,168	44–35
89	June 30	Mets	5–2	**Maddux** (9–5)	Leiter (4–7)	**Karsay** (2)	49,568	45–35

July: 15–11 (Home: 8–8; Away: 7–3)

#	Date	Opponent	Score	Win	Loss	Save	Attendance	Record
81	July 1	Mets	1–2	Appier (5–8)	**Burkett** (6–6)	Benitez (16)	37,516	45–36
82	July 3	Phillies	14–7	**Cabrera** (5–2)	Santiago (2–3)	—	34,142	46–36
83	July 4	Phillies	1–4	Coggin (1–0)	**Perez** (6–6)	Mesa (22)	46,579	46–37
84	July 5	Phillies	9–5	**Maddux** (10–5)	Chen (4–5)	—	32,031	47–37
85	July 6	@ Red Sox	6–5 (10)	**Karsay** (1–1)	Kim (0–1)	**Cabrera** (2)	33,723	48–37
86	July 7	@ Red Sox	1–3	Nomo (8–4)	**Marquis** (2–3)	Lowe (15)	33,355	48–38
87	July 8	@ Red Sox	8–0	**Glavine** (7–5)	Ohka (2–4)	—	32,677	49–38
**72nd All-Star Game in Seattle, Washington**
88	July 12	Orioles	6–5	**Maddux** (11–5)	Ryan (2–4)	**Karsay** (3)	44,465	50–38
89	July 13	Orioles	7–1	**Glavine** (8–5)	Towers (6–4)	—	44,461	51–38
90	July 14	Orioles	1–4	Roberts (7–7)	**Burkett** (6–7)	Groom (7)	50,069	51–39
91	July 15	Devil Rays	1–9	Lopez (5–11)	**Perez** (6–7)	—	31,753	51–40
92	July 16	Devil Rays	5–6	Zambrano (2–1)	**Karsay** (1–2)	Yan (9)	26,197	51–41
93	July 17	Devil Rays	4–0	**Maddux** (12–5)	Sturtze (4–8)	—	32,287	52–41
94	July 18	@ Reds	3–1 (8)	**Glavine** (9–5)	Dessens (6–8)	**Reed** (1)	27,458	53–41
95	July 19	@ Reds	2–1	**Burkett** (7–7)	Brower (4–7)	**Karsay** (4)	26,039	54–41
96	July 20	Expos	3–6	Thurman (5–6)	**Millwood** (1–4)	Urbina (15)	32,842	54–42
97	July 21	Expos	2–1 (10)	**Cabrera** (6–2)	Lloyd (7–3)	—	46,363	55–42
98	July 22	Expos	8–2	**Maddux** (13–5)	Mattes (3–2)	—	29,082	56–42
99	July 23	Reds	4–5	Sullivan (3–1)	**Remlinger** (3–2)	Graves (17)	37,052	56–43
100	July 24	Reds	3–11	Brower (5–7)	**Burkett** (7–8)	—	34,955	56–44
101	July 25	Reds	11–3	**Millwood** (2–4)	Acevedo (2–3)	—	37,015	57–44
102	July 26	@ Expos	2–3 (10)	Urbina (2–1)	**Reed** (3–2)	—	7,635	57–45
103	July 27	@ Expos	7–3	**Maddux** (14–5)	Mattes (3–3)	—	8,299	58–45
104	July 28	@ Expos	10–5	**Glavine** (10–5)	Vazquez (9–10)	—	9,390	59–45
105	July 29	@ Expos	8–1	**Burkett** (8–8)	Armas (8–10)	—	9,802	60–45
106	July 31	@ Cardinals	2–6	Hermanson (9–8)	**Reed** (3–3)	—	39,012	60–46

August: 12–16 (Home: 5–12; Away: 7–4)

#	Date	Opponent	Score	Win	Loss	Save	Attendance	Record
107	August 1	@ Cardinals	0–4	Kile (11–7)	**Maddux** (14–6)	—	37,633	60–47
108	August 2	@ Cardinals	2–1	**Glavine** (11–5)	Smith (3–1)	**Karsay** (5)	38,394	61–47
109	August 3	@ Brewers	2–3 (11)	Painter (1–1)	**Cabrera** (6–3)	—	42,259	61–48
110	August 4	@ Brewers	14–2	**Burkett** (9–8)	Quevedo (0–1)	—	42,646	62–48
111	August 5	@ Brewers	12–8	**Cabrera** (7–3)	Sheets (10–9)	—	42,263	63–48
112	August 7	Astros	6–5	**Maddux** (15–6)	Cruz (2–2)	**Karsay** (6)	35,648	64–48
113	August 8	Astros	1–2 (12)	Jackson (3–2)	**Cabrera** (7–4)	Wagner (26)	31,201	64–49
114	August 9	Astros	5–6	Dotel (6–4)	**Ligtenberg** (1–3)	—	30,499	64–50
115	August 10	Diamondbacks	0–7	Schilling (17–5)	**Millwood** (2–5)	—	40,101	64–51
116	August 11	Diamondbacks	1–3	Batista (7–7)	**Marquis** (2–4)	Kim (10)	48,367	64–52
117	August 12	Diamondbacks	1–9	Lopez (6–15)	**Maddux** (15–7)	—	34,702	64–53
118	August 14	@ Rockies	4–5 (10)	Jimenez (6–1)	**Karsay** (1–3)	—	40,677	64–54
119	August 15	@ Rockies	7–2	**Burkett** (10–8)	Hampton (12–9)	—	37,962	65–54
120	August 16	@ Rockies	4–1	**Millwood** (3–5)	Chacon (6–7)	**Karsay** (7)	37,086	66–54
121	August 17	@ Giants	2–1	**Maddux** (16–7)	Hernandez (11–12)	**Smoltz** (1)	41,718	67–54
122	August 18	@ Giants	3–1	**Marquis** (3–4)	Rueter (12–8)	**Karsay** (8)	41,722	68–54
123	August 19	@ Giants	1–4	Schmidt (9–7)	**Glavine** (11–6)	Nen (36)	41,527	68–55
124	August 21	Padres	1–3 (10)	Nunez (2–2)	**Karsay** (1–4)	Hoffman (32)	26,756	68–56
125	August 22	Padres	6–3	**Maddux** (17–7)	Tollberg (6–4)	**Remlinger** (1)	22,787	69–56
126	August 23	Padres	3–2	**Millwood** (4–5)	Lawrence (3–3)	**Smoltz** (2)	26,043	70–56
127	August 24	Dodgers	1–4	Park (12–9)	**Glavine** (11–7)	—	35,451	70–57
128	August 25	Dodgers	7–8	Prokopec (7–6)	**Marquis** (3–5)	Shaw (36)	48,225	70–58
129	August 26	Dodgers	9–2	**Burkett** (11–8)	Gagne (4–6)	—	34,469	71–58
130	August 27	Dodgers	2–4	Adams (10–6)	**Remlinger** (3–3)	Shaw (37)	26,038	71–59
131	August 28	Expos	0–7	Vazquez (14–11)	**Millwood** (4–6)	—	23,131	71–60
132	August 29	Expos	5–3	**Glavine** (12–7)	Armas (9–12)	**Smoltz** (3)	22,327	72–60
133	August 30	Expos	2–4	Ohka (3–7)	**Marquis** (3–6)	Strickland (3)	22,725	72–61
134	August 31	Cubs	2–8	Cruz (2–1)	**Burkett** (11–9)	—	37,045	72–62

September: 12–10 (Home: 3–2; Away: 9–8)

#	Date	Opponent	Score	Win	Loss	Save	Attendance	Record
135	September 1	Cubs	3–5	Tavarez (9–9)	**Maddux** (17–8)	Gordon (27)	45,842	72–63
136	September 2	Cubs	7–4	**Millwood** (5–6)	Tapani (9–11)	**Smoltz** (4)	45,165	73–63
137	September 3	@ Expos	5–0	**Glavine** (13–7)	Ohka (3–8)	—	6,748	74–63
138	September 4	@ Expos	3–2	**Karsay** (2–4)	Strickland (2–5)	**Smoltz** (5)	3,613	75–63
139	September 5	@ Expos	4–10	Thurman (8–10)	**Burkett** (11–10)	—	3,806	75–64
140	September 7	@ Cubs	3–2	**Karsay** (3–4)	Farnsworth (4–4)	**Smoltz** (6)	37,710	76–64
141	September 8	@ Cubs	5–3	**Glavine** (14–7)	Tapani (9–12)	**Smoltz** (7)	38,705	77–64
142	September 9	@ Cubs	9–5	**Ligtenberg** (2–3)	Bere (10–9)	—	37,213	78–64
–	September 11	Phillies	Postponed (9/11 attacks); rescheduled for October 2					
–	September 12	Phillies	Postponed (9/11 attacks); rescheduled for October 3					
–	September 13	Phillies	Postponed (9/11 attacks); rescheduled for October 4					
–	September 14	Marlins	Postponed (9/11 attacks); rescheduled for October 5					
–	September 15	Marlins	Postponed (9/11 attacks); rescheduled for October 6					
–	September 16	Marlins	Postponed (9/11 attacks); rescheduled for October 7					
143	September 17	@ Phillies	2–5	Person (15–6)	**Maddux** (17–9)	Mesa (37)	27,910	78–65
144	September 18	@ Phillies	3–4	Bottalico (3–4)	**Smoltz** (2–3)	—	23,653	78–66
145	September 19	@ Phillies	2–5	Coggin (5–5)	**Burkett** (11–11)	Mesa (38)	24,036	78–67
146	September 20	@ Phillies	5–1	**Millwood** (6–6)	Wolf (7–11)	—	26,863	79–67
147	September 21	@ Mets	2–3	Benitez (6–3)	**Karsay** (3–5)	—	41,235	79–68
148	September 22	@ Mets	3–7	Trachsel (10–12)	**Perez** (6–8)	Benitez (41)	41,230	79–69
149	September 23	@ Mets	5–4 (11)	**Smoltz** (3–3)	Riggan (3–3)	—	41,168	80–69
150	September 24	@ Marlins	0–1	Penny (9–9)	**Burkett** (11–12)	Alfonseca (28)	10,470	80–70
151	September 25	@ Marlins	5–2 (11)	**Ligtenberg** (3–3)	Darensbourg (1–2)	**Smoltz** (8)	9,597	81–70
152	September 26	@ Marlins	4–1	**Marquis** (4–6)	Burnett (9–12)	**Smoltz** (9)	10,168	82–70
153	September 27	@ Marlins	1–7	Acevedo (2–4)	**Maddux** (17–10)	—	9,177	82–71
154	September 28	Mets	5–3	**Glavine** (15–7)	Trachsel (10–13)	**Smoltz** (10)	43,664	83–71
155	September 29	Mets	8–5	**Perez** (7–8)	Benitez (6–4)	—	46,180	84–71
156	September 30	Mets	6–9	Appier (10–10)	**Millwood** (6–7)	Benitez (43)	42,667	84–72

October: 4–2 (Home: 4–2; Away: 0–0)

#	Date	Opponent	Score	Win	Loss	Save	Attendance	Record
157	October 2	Phillies	1–3	Wolf (9–11)	**Maddux** (17–11)	Mesa (40)	30,739	84–73
158	October 3	Phillies	8–3	**Glavine** (16–7)	Person (15–7)	—	27,431	85–73
159	October 4	Phillies	6–2	**Burkett** (12–12)	Duckworth (3–2)	—	32,283	86–73
160	October 5	Marlins	20–3	**Millwood** (7–7)	Dempster (15–12)	—	29,299	87–73
161	October 6	Marlins	7–3	**Marquis** (5–6)	Beckett (2–2)	—	31,826	88–73
162	October 7	Marlins	2–4	Burnett (11–12)	**Spooneybarger** (0–1)	Looper (3)	26,102	88–74

Legend: = Win = Loss
Bold = Braves team member

== Player stats ==
= Indicates team leader

=== Batting ===
==== Starters by position ====
Note: Pos = Position; G = Games played; AB = At bats; H = Hits; Avg. = Batting average; HR = Home runs; RBI = Runs batted in

Pos	Player	G	AB	H	Avg.	HR	RBI
C	Javy López	128	438	117	.267	17	66
1B	Rico Brogna	72	206	51	.248	3	21
2B	Quilvio Veras	71	258	65	.252	3	25
3B	Chipper Jones	159	572	189	.330	38	102
SS	Rafael Furcal	79	324	89	.275	4	30
LF	B. J. Surhoff	141	484	131	.271	10	58
CF	Andruw Jones	161	625	157	.251	34	104
RF	Brian Jordan	148	560	165	.295	25	97

==== Other batters ====
Note: G = Games played; AB = At bats; H = Hits; Avg. = Batting average; HR = Home runs; RBI = Runs batted in

Player	G	AB	H	Avg.	HR	RBI
Marcus Giles	68	244	64	.262	9	31
Dave Martinez	120	237	68	.287	2	20
Wes Helms	100	216	48	.222	10	36
Keith Lockhart	104	178	39	.219	3	12
Ken Caminiti	64	171	38	.222	6	16
Mark DeRosa	66	164	47	.287	3	20
Rey Sánchez	49	154	35	.227	0	9
Paul Bako	61	137	29	.212	2	15
Bernard Gilkey	69	106	29	.274	2	14
Julio Franco	25	90	27	.300	3	11
Eddie Pérez	5	10	3	.300	0	0
Kurt Abbott	6	9	2	.222	0	0
Jesse Garcia	22	5	1	.200	0	0
Cory Aldridge	8	5	0	.000	0	0
Wilson Betemit	8	3	0	.000	0	0
Steve Torrealba	2	2	1	.500	0	0

=== Pitching ===
==== Starting pitchers ====
Note: G = Games pitched; IP = Innings pitched; W = Wins; L = Losses; ERA = Earned run average; SO = Strikeouts

Player	G	IP	W	L	ERA	SO
Greg Maddux	34	233.0	17	11	3.05	173
John Burkett	34	219.1	12	12	3.04	187
Tom Glavine	35	219.1	16	7	3.57	116
Kevin Millwood	21	121.0	7	7	4.31	84

==== Other pitchers ====
Note: G = Games pitched; IP = Innings pitched; W = Wins; L = Losses; ERA = Earned run average; SO = Strikeouts

Player	G	IP	W	L	ERA	SO
Jason Marquis	38	129.1	5	6	3.48	98
Odalis Pérez	24	95.1	7	8	4.91	71
Damian Moss	5	9.0	0	0	3.00	8

==== Relief pitchers ====
Note: G = Games pitched; W = Wins; L = Losses; SV = Saves; ERA = Earned run average; SO = Strikeouts

Player	G	W	L	SV	ERA	SO
John Rocker	30	2	2	19	3.09	36
John Smoltz	36	3	3	10	3.36	57
Mike Remlinger	74	3	3	1	2.76	93
José Cabrera	55	7	4	2	2.88	43
Kerry Ligtenberg	53	3	3	1	3.02	56
Steve Karsay	43	3	4	7	3.43	39
Steve Reed	39	2	2	1	3.48	25
Rudy Seánez	38	0	2	1	2.75	41
Matt Whiteside	13	0	1	0	7.16	10
Marc Valdes	9	1	0	0	7.71	3
Chris Seelbach	5	0	0	0	7.88	8
Joe Slusarski	4	0	0	0	9.00	5
Tim Spooneybarger	4	0	1	0	2.25	3
Trey Moore	2	0	0	0	11.25	1
Joe Nelson	2	0	0	0	36.00	0
Scott Sobkowiak	1	0	0	0	9.00	0

== Postseason ==
=== Game log ===
2001 Postseason Game Log
National League Division Series: 3–0

#	Date	Opponent	Score	Win	Loss	Save	Attendance	Record
1	October 9	@ Astros	7–4	Seanez (1–0)	Jackson (0–1)	Smoltz (1)	35,553	1–0
2	October 10	@ Astros	1–0	Glavine (1–0)	Mlicki (0–1)	Smoltz (2)	35,704	2–0
3	October 12	Astros	6–2	Burkett (1–0)	Reynolds (0–1)	—	39,923	3–0

National League Championship Series: 1–4

#	Date	Opponent	Score	Win	Loss	Save	Attendance	Record
1	October 16	@ Diamondbacks	0–2	Johnson (1–1)	Maddux (0–1)	—	37,729	0–1
2	October 17	@ Diamondbacks	8–1	Glavine (2–0)	Batista (1–1)	—	49,334	1–1
3	October 19	Diamondbacks	1–5	Schilling (3–0)	Burkett (1–1)	—	41,624	1–2
4	October 20	Diamondbacks	4–11	Anderson (1–0)	Maddux (0–2)	Kim (2)	42,291	1–3
5	October 21	Diamondbacks	2–3	Johnson (2–1)	Glavine (2–1)	Kim (3)	35,652	1–4

== Award winners ==
- Andruw Jones, OF, Gold Glove
- Greg Maddux, Pitcher of the Month, June
- Greg Maddux, Pitcher of the Month, July
- Greg Maddux, P, Gold Glove

2001 Major League Baseball All-Star Game

- Chipper Jones, 3B, starter
- John Burkett, P, reserve

== Farm system ==
Level	Team	League	Manager
AAA	Richmond Braves	International League	Carlos Tosca
AA	Greenville Braves	Southern League	Paul Runge
A	Myrtle Beach Pelicans	Carolina League	Brian Snitker
A	Macon Braves	South Atlantic League	Randy Ingle
A-Short Season	Jamestown Jammers	New York–Penn League	Jim Saul
Rookie	Danville Braves	Appalachian League	Ralph Henriquez
Rookie	GCL Braves	Gulf Coast League	Rick Albert
