= 2001 Florida Marlins season =

2001 Florida Marlins
- League: National League
- Division: East
- Ballpark: Dolphin Stadium
- City: Miami Gardens, Florida
- Record: 76–86 (.469)
- Divisional place: 4th
- Owners: John W. Henry
- General managers: Dave Dombrowski
- Managers: John Boles, Tony Pérez
- Television: FSN Florida; WAMI-TV (Dave O'Brien, Tommy Hutton)
- Radio: WQAM (Dave Van Horne, Jon Sciambi); WQBA (Spanish) (Felo Ramírez, Ángel Rodríguez)

The 2001 Florida Marlins season was the ninth season for the Major League Baseball (MLB) franchise in the National League. It would begin with the team attempting to improve on their season from 2000. Their managers were John Boles and Tony Pérez. They played home games at Pro Player Stadium. They finished with a record of 76–86, fourth in the National League East.

== Offseason ==
- November 13, 2000: Matt Treanor was signed as a free agent with the Florida Marlins.
- December 18, 2000: Charles Johnson was signed as a free agent by the Marlins.
- March 28, 2001: Mark Kotsay was traded by the Florida Marlins with Cesar Crespo to the San Diego Padres for Matt Clement, Eric Owens, and Omar Ortíz (minors).

== Regular season ==
=== Season standings ===
NL East
Team	W	L	Pct.	GB	Home	Road
Atlanta Braves	88	74	.543	—	40‍–‍41	48‍–‍33
Philadelphia Phillies	86	76	.531	2	47‍–‍34	39‍–‍42
New York Mets	82	80	.506	6	44‍–‍37	38‍–‍43
Florida Marlins	76	86	.469	12	46‍–‍34	30‍–‍52
Montreal Expos	68	94	.420	20	34‍–‍47	34‍–‍47

==== Record vs. opponents ====
2001 National League record Source: MLB Standings Grid – 2001
Team	AZ	ATL	CHC	CIN	COL	FLA	HOU	LAD	MIL	MON	NYM	PHI	PIT	SD	SF	STL	AL
Arizona	—	5–2	6–3	5–1	13–6	4–2	2–4	10–9	3–3	3–3	3–3	3–4	4–2	12–7	10–9	2–4	7–8
Atlanta	2–5	—	4–2	4–2	4–2	9–10	3–3	2–5	3–3	13–6	10–9	10–9	5–1	3–3	4–2	3–3	9–9
Chicago	3–6	2–4	—	13–4	3–3	3–3	8–9	4–2	8–9	3–3	4–2	4–2	10–6	2–4	3–3	9–8	9–6
Cincinnati	1–5	2–4	4–13	—	3–6	4–2	6–11	4–2	6–10	4–2	4–2	2–4	9–8	2–4	4–2	7–10	4–11
Colorado	6–13	2–4	3–3	6–3	—	4–2	2–4	8–11	5–1	3–4	4–3	2–4	2–4	9–10	9–10	6–3	2–10
Florida	2–4	10–9	3–3	2–4	2–4	—	3–3	2–5	4–2	12–7	7–12	5–14	4–2	3–4	2–4	3–3	12–6
Houston	4–2	3–3	9–8	11–6	4–2	3–3	—	2–4	12–5	6–0	3–3	3–3	9–8	3–6	3–3	9–7	9–6
Los Angeles	9–10	5–2	2–4	2–4	11–8	5–2	4–2	—	5–1	2–4	2–4	3–3	7–2	9–10	11–8	3–3	6–9
Milwaukee	3–3	3–3	9–8	10–6	1–5	2–4	5–12	1–5	—	4–2	3–3	3–3	6–11	1–5	5–4	7–10	5–10
Montreal	3–3	6–13	3–3	2–4	4–3	7–12	0–6	4–2	2–4	—	8–11	9–10	5–1	3–3	2–5	2–4	8–10
New York	3–3	9–10	2–4	2–4	3–4	12–7	3–3	4–2	3–3	11–8	—	11–8	4–2	1–5	3–4	1–5	10–8
Philadelphia	4–3	9–10	2–4	4–2	4–2	14–5	3–3	3–3	3–3	10–9	8–11	—	5–1	5–2	3–3	2–4	7–11
Pittsburgh	2–4	1–5	6–10	8–9	4–2	2–4	8–9	2–7	11–6	1–5	2–4	1–5	—	2–4	1–5	3–14	8–7
San Diego	7–12	3–3	4–2	4–2	10–9	4–3	6–3	10–9	5–1	3–3	5–1	2–5	4–2	—	5–14	1–5	6–9
San Francisco	9–10	2–4	3–3	2–4	10–9	4–2	3–3	8–11	4–5	5–2	4–3	3–3	5–1	14–5	—	4–2	10–5
St. Louis	4–2	3–3	8–9	10–7	3–6	3–3	7–9	3–3	10–7	4–2	5–1	4–2	14–3	5–1	2–4	—	8–7

=== Notable transactions ===
April 9, 2001: John Mabry was sent to the Florida Marlins by the St. Louis Cardinals as part of a conditional deal.

=== Citrus Series ===
The annual interleague games between the Florida Marlins and the Tampa Bay Devil Rays were played in June and July. They are known as the Citrus Series. The Marlins won the series 4-2.

- June 15- @ Marlins 7- Devil Rays 4
- June 16- @ Marlins 11- Devil Rays 0
- June 17- @ Marlins 6- Devil Rays 4
- July 6- @ Devil Rays 5- Marlins 4 (11 innings)
- July 7- @ Devil Rays 4- Marlins 3
- July 8- Marlins 6- @ Devil Rays 1

=== Roster ===
2001 Florida Marlins
Roster
Pitchers: 53 Juan Acevedo; 57 Antonio Alfonseca; 55 Armando Almanza; 49 Benito Báez; 61 Josh Beckett; 29 Ricky Bones; 43 A. J. Burnett; 51 Matt Clement; 22 Vic Darensbourg; 46 Ryan Dempster; 37 Jason Grilli; 56 Gary Knotts; 41 Braden Looper; 34 Dan Miceli; 54 Blaine Neal; 36 Vladimir Núñez; 56 Kevin Olsen; 28 Brad Penny; 48 Johnny Ruffin; 21 Jesús Sánchez; 45 Chuck Smith; 50 Joe Strong	Catchers: 17 Ramón Castro; 23 Charles Johnson; 52 Mike Redmond; Infielders: 10 Dave Berg; 1 Luis Castillo; 6 Andy Fox; 11 Álex González; 27 Mike Gulan; 25 Derrek Lee; 19 Mike Lowell	Outfielders: 18 Jeff Abbott; 30 Cliff Floyd; 47 John Mabry; 9 Ryan McGuire; 15 Kevin Millar; 27 Chad Mottola; 4 Lyle Mouton; 4 Eric Owens; 14 Ryan Thompson; 44 Preston Wilson	Manager: 13 John Boles; 24 Tony Pérez; Coaches: 12 Joe Breeden (bench); 31 Rich Dubee (pitching); 33 Fredi González (third base); 35 Lynn Jones (first base); 16 Jack Maloof (hitting); 8 Tony Taylor (bullpen)

== Player stats ==
=== Batting ===
==== Starters by position ====
Note: Pos = Position; G = Games played; AB = At bats; H = Hits; Avg. = Batting average; HR = Home runs; RBI = Runs batted in

Pos	Player	G	AB	H	Avg.	HR	RBI
C	Charles Johnson	128	451	117	.259	18	75
1B	Derrek Lee	158	561	158	.282	21	75
2B	Luis Castillo	134	537	141	.263	2	45
SS	Álex González	145	515	129	.250	9	48
3B	Mike Lowell	146	551	156	.283	18	100
LF	Cliff Floyd	149	555	176	.317	31	103
CF	Preston Wilson	123	468	128	.274	23	71
RF	Eric Owens	119	400	101	.253	5	28

==== Other batters ====
Note: G = Games played; AB = At bats; H = Hits; Avg. = Batting average; HR = Home runs; RBI = Runs batted in

Player	G	AB	H	Avg.	HR	RBI
Kevin Millar	144	449	141	.314	20	85
Dave Berg	82	215	52	.242	4	16
John Mabry	82	147	32	.218	6	20
Mike Redmond	48	141	44	.312	4	14
Andy Fox	54	81	15	.185	3	7
Ryan McGuire	48	54	10	.185	1	8
Jeff Abbott	28	42	11	.262	0	5
Ryan Thompson	18	31	9	.290	0	2
Lyle Mouton	21	17	1	.059	0	1
Ramón Castro	7	11	2	.182	0	1
Chad Mottola	5	7	0	.000	0	1
Mike Gulan	6	6	0	.000	0	0

=== Pitching ===
==== Starting pitchers ====
Note: G = Games pitched; IP = Innings pitched; W = Wins; L = Losses; ERA = Earned run average; SO = Strikeouts

Player	G	IP	W	L	ERA	SO
Ryan Dempster	34	211.1	15	12	4.94	171
Brad Penny	31	205.0	10	10	3.69	154
A.J. Burnett	27	173.1	11	12	4.05	128
Matt Clement	31	169.1	9	10	5.05	134
Chuck Smith	15	88.0	5	5	4.70	71
Jason Grilli	6	26.2	2	2	6.08	17
Josh Beckett	4	24.0	2	2	1.50	24

==== Other pitchers ====
Note: G = Games pitched; IP = Innings pitched; W = Wins; L = Losses; ERA = Earned run average; SO = Strikeouts

Player	G	IP	W	L	ERA	SO
Jesús Sánchez	16	62.2	2	4	4.74	46
Kevin Olsen	4	15.0	0	0	1.20	13
Gary Knotts	2	6.0	0	1	6.00	9

==== Relief pitchers ====
Note: G = Games pitched; W = Wins; L = Losses; SV = Saves; ERA = Earned run average; SO = Strikeouts

Player	G	W	L	SV	ERA	SO
Antonio Alfonseca	58	4	4	28	3.06	40
Braden Looper	71	3	3	3	3.55	52
Ricky Bones	61	4	4	0	5.06	41
Vic Darensbourg	58	1	2	1	4.25	33
Vladimir Núñez	52	4	5	0	2.74	64
Armando Almanza	52	2	2	0	4.83	45
Dan Miceli	29	0	5	0	6.93	31
Juan Acevedo	20	2	3	0	2.54	21
Benito Báez	8	0	0	0	13.50	14
Joe Strong	5	0	0	0	1.35	4
Blaine Neal	4	0	0	0	6.75	3
Johnny Ruffin	3	0	0	0	4.91	4
John Mabry	1	0	0	0	135.00	0

== Farm system ==
Level	Team	League	Manager
AAA	Calgary Cannons	Pacific Coast League	Chris Chambliss
AA	Portland Sea Dogs	Eastern League	Rick Renteria
A	Brevard County Manatees	Florida State League	Dave Huppert
A	Kane County Cougars	Midwest League	Russ Morman
A-Short Season	Utica Blue Sox	New York–Penn League	Kevin Boles
Rookie	GCL Marlins	Gulf Coast League	Jon Deeble

LEAGUE CHAMPIONS: Kane County; LEAGUE CO-CHAMPIONS: Brevard County
