= 2001 Major League Baseball postseason =

2001 Major League Baseball playoffs

Tournament details
- Dates: October 9 – November 4, 2001
- Teams: 8

Final positions
- Champions: Arizona Diamondbacks (1st title)
- Runners-up: New York Yankees

Tournament statistics
- Most HRs: Three tied (3)
- Most SBs: Alfonso Soriano (NYY) (4)
- Most Ks (as pitcher): Curt Schilling (ARI) (56)

Awards
- MVP: Randy Johnson and Curt Schilling (ARI)

The 2001 Major League Baseball postseason was the playoff tournament of Major League Baseball for the 2001 season. The winners of the League Division Series would move on to the League Championship Series to determine the pennant winners that face each other in the World Series.

In the American League, the New York Yankees made their seventh straight postseason appearance, the Seattle Mariners and Oakland Athletics returned for the second straight year, and the Cleveland Indians returned for the sixth time in eight years. The 2001 Mariners set an MLB record by winning 116 games during the regular season. This was Seattle’s last postseason appearance until 2022, and their last postseason appearance as a division champion until 2025.

In the National League, the Atlanta Braves made their tenth consecutive postseason appearance, becoming the first team in MLB history to accomplish this feat. Joining them were the St. Louis Cardinals, who returned for the second year in a row. The Houston Astros made their third appearance in the past four years, and the Arizona Diamondbacks made their second appearance in the past three years.

The September 11 terrorist attacks on New York and Washington, D.C. pushed the end of the regular season from September 30 to October 7. Because of the attack, the World Series was not completed until November 4. The 2001 World Series was the first World Series to end in November.

The postseason began on October 9, 2001, and ended on November 4, 2001, with the Diamondbacks shocking the three-time defending World Series champion Yankees in seven games in the 2001 World Series. It was the first major professional sports championship won by a Phoenix-based team.

== Playoff seeds ==
American League Teams National League Teams

The following teams qualified for the postseason:

=== American League ===
1. Seattle Mariners – 116–46, AL West champions
2. New York Yankees – 95–65, AL East champions
3. Cleveland Indians – 91–71, AL Central champions
4. Oakland Athletics – 102–60

=== National League ===
1. Houston Astros – 93–69, NL Central champions (9–7 head-to-head vs. STL)
2. Arizona Diamondbacks – 92–70, NL West champions
3. Atlanta Braves – 88–74, NL East champions
4. St. Louis Cardinals – 93–69 (7–9 head-to-head vs. HOU)

== Playoff bracket ==
Division Series (ALDS, NLDS)
1	Seattle	3
3	Cleveland	2
American League
2	NY Yankees	3
4	Oakland	2
1	Houston	0
3	Atlanta	3
National League
2	Arizona	3
4	St. Louis	2

League Championship Series (NLCS, ALCS)
1	Seattle	1
2	NY Yankees	4
3	Atlanta	1
2	Arizona	4

World Series
AL2	NY Yankees	3
NL2	Arizona	4

Note: Two teams in the same division could not meet in the division series.

== American League Division Series ==
=== (1) Seattle Mariners vs. (3) Cleveland Indians ===
Seattle won the series, 3–2.

Game	Date	Score	Location	Time	Attendance
1	October 9	Cleveland Indians – 5, Seattle Mariners – 0	Safeco Field	3:05	48,033
2	October 11	Cleveland Indians – 1, Seattle Mariners – 5	Safeco Field	2:41	48,052
3	October 13	Seattle Mariners – 2, Cleveland Indians – 17	Jacobs Field	3:24	45,069
4	October 14	Seattle Mariners – 6, Cleveland Indians – 2	Jacobs Field	3:16	45,025
5	October 15	Cleveland Indians – 1, Seattle Mariners – 3	Safeco Field	3:18	47,867

This was the second postseason meeting between the Mariners and Indians. They had previously met in the ALCS in 1995, which the Indians won in six games before falling in the World Series. The Mariners narrowly defeated the Indians in five games to return to the ALCS for the third time in seven years.

Bartolo Colón pitched eight shutout innings in Game 1 as the Indians stunned the Mariners 5–0 on the road. In Game 2, Mike Cameron, Edgar Martínez, David Bell all homered for the Mariners as they won 5–1 to even the series headed to Cleveland. In Game 3, the Indians blew out the Mariners 17–2 to regain the series lead, handing the Mariners their worst playoff loss ever and were now one win away from completing a massive upset. However, their lead wouldn’t hold. Freddy García pitched seven solid innings in Game 4 as the Mariners won by four runs to send the series back to Seattle for a decisive fifth game. Jamie Moyer and Kazuhiro Sasaki kept the Indians offense at bay in Game 5 as the Mariners won 3–1 to hang on and advance.

This was the most recent playoff win for Seattle until 2022, and their last LDS series win until 2025.

=== (2) New York Yankees vs. (4) Oakland Athletics ===
New York won the series, 3–2.

Game	Date	Score	Location	Time	Attendance
1	October 10	Oakland Athletics – 5, New York Yankees – 3	Yankee Stadium (I)	3:45	56,697
2	October 11	Oakland Athletics – 2, New York Yankees – 0	Yankee Stadium (I)	3:24	56,684
3	October 13	New York Yankees – 1, Oakland Athletics – 0	Network Associates Coliseum	2:42	55,861
4	October 14	New York Yankees – 9, Oakland Athletics – 2	Network Associates Coliseum	4:13	43,681
5	October 15	Oakland Athletics – 3, New York Yankees – 5	Yankee Stadium (I)	3:23	56,642

In a rematch of the previous year's ALDS, the Yankees rallied from a two-games-to-none series deficit to once again defeat the Athletics in five games, returning to the ALCS for the fifth time in the past six seasons.

The Athletics’ offense chased Roger Clemens from the mound as they stole Game 1 on the road. Tim Hudson pitched eight innings of shutout ball as the Athletics took Game 2 to go up 2–0 in the series headed to Oakland.

Game 3 of this ALDS was memorable for a play by Derek Jeter in the top of the eighth inning. During that inning, Oakland's Terrance Long hit a towering foul pop up in a two-run game. Jeter then went after the ball making a backhanded grab, and then turning his body, flipped into the stands. For a moment, no one knew if the ball had been caught, but it was eventually confirmed. The Yankees would end up winning Game 3 by a 1-0 score to get on the board in the series.

In Game 4, the Yankees blew out the Athletics to force a decisive fifth game back in the Bronx. In Game 5, David Justice helped secure a Yankees win in the top of the sixth with a solo homer as they won 5-3 to advance.

Game 5 of this ALDS is shown in the opening scene of the 2011 film Moneyball. The film shows Johnny Damon's first inning leadoff double followed by Jason Giambi’s RBI single. Then, the defensive miscues by Oakland are shown as three errors were committed. The final out of the game (Eric Byrnes striking out) is used as a transition point from the game footage to the actual beginning of the film.

== National League Division Series ==
=== (1) Houston Astros vs. (3) Atlanta Braves ===
Atlanta won the series, 3–0.

Game	Date	Score	Location	Time	Attendance
1	October 9	Atlanta Braves – 7, Houston Astros – 4	Enron Field	2:51	35,553
2	October 10	Atlanta Braves – 1, Houston Astros – 0	Enron Field	2:41	35,704
3	October 12	Houston Astros – 2, Atlanta Braves – 6	Turner Field	2:33	39,923

In the third postseason meeting between these two teams, the Braves swept the top-seeded Astros to return to the NLCS for the ninth time in eleven years.

Chipper Jones, Brian Jordan, and Andruw Jones all homered for the Braves as they rallied late to win Game 1 in Houston. Tom Glavine and John Smoltz kept the Astros’ bats silent in Game 2 as they pitched a 1–0 shutout to give the Braves a 2–0 series lead headed back home. John Burkett and the Braves’ bullpen once again neutered the Astros’ offense as they won 6–2 to complete the sweep. This was the Braves’ last playoff series win until 2020.

The Braves and Astros would meet again in the NLDS two more times - in 2004 and 2005, which were both won by the Astros. They would also meet in the 2021 World Series, which the Braves won in six games.

=== (2) Arizona Diamondbacks vs. (4) St. Louis Cardinals ===
Arizona won the series, 3–2.

Game	Date	Score	Location	Time	Attendance
1	October 9	St. Louis Cardinals – 0, Arizona Diamondbacks – 1	Bank One Ballpark	2:36	42,251
2	October 10	St. Louis Cardinals – 4, Arizona Diamondbacks – 1	Bank One Ballpark	3:15	41,793
3	October 12	Arizona Diamondbacks – 5, St. Louis Cardinals – 3	Busch Stadium (II)	3:36	52,273
4	October 13	Arizona Diamondbacks – 1, St. Louis Cardinals – 4	Busch Stadium (II)	2:47	52,194
5	October 14	St. Louis Cardinals – 1, Arizona Diamondbacks – 2	Bank One Ballpark	3:05	42,810

This was the first postseason meeting between the Diamondbacks and Cardinals. The Diamondbacks prevailed in a back-and-forth five game series to advance to the NLCS for the first time in franchise history.

Curt Schilling pitched a three-hit complete game shutout as the Diamondbacks took Game 1. Game 2 was a pitchers’ duel between Woody Williams and Randy Johnson, which was won by the former as the Cardinals won Game 2 by a 4–1 score to even the series headed to St. Louis. Game 2 was notable for Albert Pujols’ first postseason home run, which he hit in the top of the first. In Game 3, Craig Counsell helped complete a Diamondbacks comeback in the top of the seventh with a three-run homer as they won 5-3 to regain the series lead. Game 3 would ultimately be Darryl Kile’s final postseason game, as he died from coronary artery disease the following season at the young age of 33. In Game 4, Jim Edmonds put the Cardinals in the lead for good early on with a solo homer in the bottom of the second to force a decisive fifth game back in Phoenix. Schilling pitched yet another complete game in Game 5 as the Diamondbacks won their first postseason series.

Both teams would meet again in the NLDS the following year, which the Cardinals won in a sweep.

== American League Championship Series ==
=== (1) Seattle Mariners vs. (2) New York Yankees ===
New York won the series, 4–1.

Game	Date	Score	Location	Time	Attendance
1	October 17	New York Yankees – 4, Seattle Mariners – 2	Safeco Field	3:06	47,644
2	October 18	New York Yankees – 3, Seattle Mariners – 2	Safeco Field	3:25	47,791
3	October 20	Seattle Mariners – 14, New York Yankees – 3	Yankee Stadium (I)	3:49	56,517
4	October 21	Seattle Mariners – 1, New York Yankees – 3	Yankee Stadium (I)	3:24	56,375
5	October 22	Seattle Mariners – 3, New York Yankees – 12	Yankee Stadium (I)	3:18	56,370

This was the third postseason meeting between the Yankees and Mariners, and a rematch of the previous year’s ALCS, which was won by the Yankees in six games. In a significant upset given their regular season win differential, the 95-win Yankees defeated the 116-win Mariners in five games to advance to the World Series for the fifth time in six years.

The series was lopsided in favor of the Yankees - Andy Pettitte and Mariano Rivera excelled on the mound as the Yankees stole Game 1 in Seattle. Mike Mussina and Rivera stopped a rally by the Mariners as they took Game 2 to go up 2–0 in the series headed to the Bronx. In Game 3, Jamie Moyer pitched seven solid innings and John Olerud, Jay Buhner, and Bret Boone all homered as the Mariners blew out the Yankees to get on the board in the series. Game 4 remained scoreless through seven innings until Boone put the Mariners in the lead with a solo home run in the top of the eighth. However, it wouldn’t hold as the Yankees rallied to win in the bottom of the ninth thanks to a walk-off two-run home run from Alfonso Soriano to take a commanding 3–1 series lead. The Yankees clinched the pennant with a blowout win in Game 5 as Bernie Williams, Tino Martinez and Paul O'Neill all hit home runs.

With the win, the Yankees became the first team to win four straight league pennants since they did so from 1955 to 1958, and remain the only American League franchise to accomplish such a feat. The Yankees would win their next pennant in 2003 over their archrival in the Boston Red Sox in seven games after being five outs away from elimination in Game 7, but came up short in the World Series.

After the series loss, the Mariners entered a slump, and held the longest postseason appearance drought in North American sports, as they would not return to the postseason again until 2022. The Mariners would return to the ALCS in 2025, but they would narrowly lose to the Toronto Blue Jays in seven games after being eight outs away from the pennant in Game 7, which is to date the closest the Mariners have come to winning a league pennant.

In 2023, MLB.com ranked the Yankees’ upset of the Mariners as the third biggest upset in postseason history.

== National League Championship Series ==
=== (2) Arizona Diamondbacks vs. (3) Atlanta Braves ===
Arizona won the series, 4–1.

Game	Date	Score	Location	Time	Attendance
1	October 16	Atlanta Braves– 0, Arizona Diamondbacks – 2	Bank One Ballpark	2:44	37,729
2	October 17	Atlanta Braves – 8, Arizona Diamondbacks – 1	Bank One Ballpark	2:54	49,334
3	October 19	Arizona Diamondbacks – 5, Atlanta Braves – 1	Turner Field	2:59	41,624
4	October 20	Arizona Diamondbacks – 11, Atlanta Braves – 4	Turner Field	3:47	42,291
5	October 21	Arizona Diamondbacks – 3, Atlanta Braves – 2	Turner Field	3:13	35,652

The Diamondbacks defeated the Braves in five games to advance to the World Series for the first time in franchise history.

Randy Johnson pitched a three-hit complete game shutout as the Diamondbacks took Game 1, out-dueling Greg Maddux. In Game 2, Tom Glavine pitched seven strong innings as the Braves blew out the Diamondbacks to even the series headed to Atlanta. Curt Schilling pitched another complete game for the Diamondbacks as they regained the series lead in Game 3. In Game 4, the Diamondbacks blew out the Braves to take a 3–1 series lead. In Game 5, Byung-hyun Kim held off a late rally by the Braves as the Diamondbacks held on to win and secure their first NL pennant.

The Diamondbacks would return to the NLCS in 2007, but were swept by the Colorado Rockies. They would win their next and most recent pennant in 2023 over the Philadelphia Phillies in seven games before coming up short in the World Series.

The Braves returned to the NLCS in 2020, but they fell to the eventual World Series champion Los Angeles Dodgers in seven games after leading 3–1 in the series. They would eventually win the pennant again in 2021 over the aforementioned Dodgers in six games en route to a World Series title.

== 2001 World Series ==
=== (AL2) New York Yankees vs. (NL2) Arizona Diamondbacks ===
Arizona won the series, 4–3.

Game	Date	Score	Location	Time	Attendance
1	October 27	New York Yankees – 1, Arizona Diamondbacks – 9	Bank One Ballpark	2:44	49,646
2	October 28	New York Yankees – 0, Arizona Diamondbacks – 4	Bank One Ballpark	2:35	49,646
3	October 30	Arizona Diamondbacks – 1, New York Yankees – 2	Yankee Stadium (I)	3:26	55,820
4	October 31	Arizona Diamondbacks – 3, New York Yankees – 4 (10)	Yankee Stadium (I)	3:31	55,863
5	November 1	Arizona Diamondbacks – 2, New York Yankees – 3 (12)	Yankee Stadium (I)	4:15	56,018
6	November 3	New York Yankees – 2, Arizona Diamondbacks – 15	Bank One Ballpark	3:33	49,707
7	November 4	New York Yankees – 2, Arizona Diamondbacks – 3	Bank One Ballpark	3:20	49,589

This was the first World Series ever played in the Mountain West region. In what is considered by many to be one of the greatest World Series ever played, the Diamondbacks shocked the three-time defending World Series champion Yankees in seven games to win their first championship in franchise history, denying the Yankees a fourth straight title.

Curt Schilling pitched seven solid innings as the Diamondbacks blew out the Yankees in Game 1. Randy Johnson pitched a three-hit complete-game shutout in a Diamondbacks victory in Game 2 to take a 2-0 series lead headed to the Bronx. An RBI single from Scott Brosius gave the Yankees a narrow victory in Game 3. Then, the Yankees won Games 4 and 5, both in extra innings, due to two blown saves from Arizona's Byung-hyun Kim, and were now one win away from a fourth straight title. Game 4 was the first November game in Major League Baseball history, and the scoreboard clock in Yankee Stadium displayed the message "Welcome to November Baseball" when the clock struck midnight on November 1st. However, when the series moved back to Phoenix for Game 6, the Diamondbacks routed the Yankees by a 15–2 score to force a decisive seventh game, handing the Yankees what was their worst postseason loss in franchise history until 2018. The Diamondbacks’ thirteen-run margin of victory in Game 6 was the largest in a World Series game since Game 6 of the 1982 World Series, and is tied for the second largest margin of victory in a World Series game overall.

Game 7 was the most memorable contest of the series - in the first World Series Game 7 for the Yankees since 1964, the Diamondbacks scored first in the bottom of the sixth to go up 1–0. Then the Yankees scored two runs in the top of the seventh and eighth innings to take the lead. In the bottom of the ninth, the Yankees were two outs away from securing a fourth straight title, however the Diamondbacks tied the game at two runs each, handing Yankees closer Mariano Rivera his first blown save in four years. The series then ended with a walk-off, bases-loaded bloop single by Luis Gonzalez to clinch the title for Arizona. As a result of the Diamondbacks’ victory, Randy Johnson became the first pitcher to win three World Series games since Mickey Lolich did so in 1968, and was the last to do so until Yoshinobu Yamamoto in 2025, though like Yamamoto, Johnson pitched fewer innings and only got his third win in relief. This was the first World Series since 1991 in which neither team won a game on the road, and the last time it has occurred to date.

This was the first (and only) championship of the four major North American sports leagues won by a Phoenix-based team. The NBA’s Phoenix Suns reached the NBA Finals three times in their history - 1976, 1993, and 2021, but lost each time in six games. The NFL’s Arizona Cardinals reached the Super Bowl in 2009, but narrowly lost. The NHL's Arizona Coyotes never reached the Stanley Cup Final and eventually moved to Salt Lake City to become the Utah Mammoth. To date, no other professional sports team from Phoenix has won a championship. The Diamondbacks would eventually return to the World Series in 2023 as part of a Cinderella playoff run as the NL’s sixth seed, but they would lose to the Texas Rangers in five games.

The Yankees would return to the World Series in 2003, but were upset by the Florida Marlins in six games. They would win their next and most recent championship in 2009, against the Philadelphia Phillies in six games.

== Broadcasting ==
This was the only postseason in which games primarily aired in the United States on Fox, with selected Division Series games on sister network Fox Family. Rightsholder ESPN did not originally sign on to air playoff games. This was modified in 2002 after Fox Family was sold to ESPN's parent company Disney and rebranded as ABC Family.
