= John Boles (baseball) =

American baseball executive and manager

- Manager
- Born: August 19, 1948 (age 77); Chicago, Illinois, U.S.
- Bats: Left Throws: Left

MLB statistics
- Games managed: 446
- Managerial record: 205–241
- Winning percentage: .460
- Stats at Baseball Reference
- Managerial record at Baseball Reference

Teams
- Florida Marlins (1996, 1999–2001)

John E. Boles Jr. (born August 19, 1948) is an American former professional baseball front office executive, manager, and college baseball head coach. As of 2013, he was serving as the senior adviser to the general manager for player development for the Kansas City Royals of Major League Baseball (MLB).

Boles spent two terms—1996 (July 11–end of the season), and (1999–May 28, 2001)—as manager of the Florida Marlins, compiling a win–loss record of 205–241 (.460). He also served two separate terms as a member of the Royals' front office, held executive positions with the Marlins, Montreal Expos, Los Angeles Dodgers and Seattle Mariners, and was a manager in both the Chicago White Sox and Royals organizations.

== Early career ==
Boles graduated from Leo Catholic High School in Chicago in 1966, and Lewis University, Romeoville, Illinois, in 1970. He did not play professional baseball, and began his career as a college baseball coach at St. Xavier University (1973–79) and the University of Louisville (1980–81). He joined the White Sox system as manager of their Rookie League affiliate, the GCL White Sox, in 1981.

By 1986, Boles had risen through the ranks in his managerial career to Triple-A. Having grown up as a White Sox fan, Boles wanted the chance to coach or manage his hometown team. In 1986, ChiSox third-base coach Jim Leyland was appointed manager of the Pittsburgh Pirates. White Sox skipper Tony La Russa wanted Boles to be Leyland's replacement, but Ken Harrelson, newly named the club's director of baseball operations, hired Doug Rader instead. So Boles departed for the Royals' organization as manager of Triple-A Omaha. After one season, he was promoted by the Royals' general manager, John Schuerholz, to director of player development.

Meanwhile, former White Sox executive Dave Dombrowski (also forced out of the organization by Harrelson) had moved on to the Montreal Expos, where he eventually became general manager. In 1989, Dombrowski hired Boles as the Expos' vice president/player development. At the end of the 1991 season, Dombrowski was recruited by the National League's new expansion team, the Florida Marlins, to become their first general manager. Boles accompanied Dombrowski to Florida as the Marlins' first vp/player development.

== Managerial career ==
Boles was still in that position in 1996 when, on July 7, Marlins manager Rene Lachemann was fired, and Boles was named interim manager. He led the Marlins to a 40–35 record in the second half of that season. However, during the offseason, then-Marlins owner H. Wayne Huizenga decided to sign several marquee free agents to make a run at the World Series. In addition to Gary Sheffield, Jeff Conine, Édgar Rentería, Robb Nen and Kevin Brown, among others, who were already with Florida, the Marlins signed free agents Alex Fernandez, Moisés Alou and Bobby Bonilla—then named Jim Leyland, highly successful with the small-market Pirates (with three National League East Division titles from 1990 to 1992), as manager. Leyland's signing returned Boles to his previous position as vp/player development. The talented 1997 Marlins then won the National League pennant and the World Series.

A year after the championship season, Huizenga—intent on selling the franchise—ordered a "fire sale" in which nearly every marquee player was traded away. Leyland remained the manager, and in 1998, he led the team to a dismal 54–108 record, making the team the first defending World Series champion to lose 100 games the next season. After the season, Leyland resigned to manage the Colorado Rockies, and Boles returned to manage the Marlins for the 1999 season. He led them to a 64–98 record that year, then followed it up with an improved 2000 record of 79–82. But on May 29, 2001, one day after relief pitcher Dan Miceli publicly criticized Boles, citing the fact that the Marlins' manager had never played professional baseball, Boles was fired. At 22–26, the Marlins were in third place in the NL East, eight games out of the lead. He was replaced by special assistant to the general manager Tony Pérez.

== Post-managerial career ==
The Marlins also were undergoing massive front-office changes, with Huizenga's successor as owner, John W. Henry, selling the team and Dombrowski leaving to become president of the Detroit Tigers. In 2002, Boles resumed his executive career. He was hired by the Dodgers as senior advisor for baseball operations. Then, in 2005, he joined the Mariners as special assistant to the executive vice president and general manager, serving also as a scout. In 2012, he rejoined the Royals as a senior advisor to general manager Dayton Moore.

His son, Kevin Boles, is a manager in Minor League Baseball with the Montgomery Biscuits.

== Managerial records ==
Team	Year	Regular season				Postseason			
Team	Year	Won	Lost	Win %	Finish	Won	Lost	Win %	Result
FLA	1996	40	35	.533	3rd in NL East	–	–	–	–
FLA	1999	64	98	.395	5th in NL East	–	–	–	–
FLA	2000	79	82	.491	3rd in NL East	–	–	–	–
FLA	2001	22	26	.458	3rd in NL East	–	–	–	(fired)
Total		205	241	.460					
