= Benito Báez =

Dominican baseball player (born 1977)

- Pitcher
- Born: May 6, 1977 (age 48); Bonao, Dominican Republic
- Batted: Left Threw: Left

MLB debut
- August 25, 2001, for the Florida Marlins

Last MLB appearance
- October 5, 2001, for the Florida Marlins

MLB statistics
- Win–loss record: 0–0
- Earned run average: 13.50
- Strikeouts: 14
- Stats at Baseball Reference

Teams
- Florida Marlins (2001)

Benito Báez (born May 6, 1977) is a Dominican professional baseball pitcher who played for one season in the major leagues. He pitched for the Florida Marlins for eight games during the 2001 Florida Marlins season. In 2008, he pitched for the Newark Bears in the Atlantic League of Professional Baseball. He coached freshman baseball with Grand Rapids Christian High School in Grand Rapids, Michigan. Now he is at The Potter's House High School Varsity Baseball team.
