= José Cabrera (baseball, born 1972) =

Dominican baseball player (born 1972)

- Pitcher
- Born: March 24, 1972 (age 54); Santiago de los Caballeros, Dominican Republic
- Batted: Right Threw: Right

Professional debut
- MLB: July 15, 1997, for the Houston Astros
- KBO: 2004, for the SK Wyverns

Last appearance
- MLB: September 25, 2002, for the Milwaukee Brewers
- KBO: 2007, for the Lotte Giants

MLB statistics
- Win–loss record: 19–17
- Earned run average: 4.95
- Strikeouts: 192

KBO statistics
- Win–loss record: 8–11
- Earned run average: 3.82
- Strikeouts: 174
- Stats at Baseball Reference

Teams
- Houston Astros (1997–2000); Atlanta Braves (2001); Milwaukee Brewers (2002); SK Wyverns (2004–2006); Lotte Giants (2007)
Medals
Men's baseball
Representing Dominican Republic
Central American and Caribbean Games
Gold medal – first place	2010 Mayagüez	Team

José Alberto Cabrera (born March 24, 1972) is a Dominican former professional baseball pitcher. He played in Major League Baseball (MLB) for the Houston Astros, Atlanta Braves, and Milwaukee Brewers. Cabrera also played for the SK Wyverns and Lotte Giants of the KBO League.

Born in Santiago de los Caballeros, Dominican Republic's second-largest city, Cabrera entered the majors in 1997 with the Houston Astros, playing four years for them before joining the Atlanta Braves (2001) and Milwaukee Brewers (2002). His most productive season came in 2001 with the Braves, when he posted career-highs with seven wins (7) and a 2.88 ERA in 55 appearances coming out of the bullpen. Before the 2002 season, he was sent by Atlanta, along with Paul Bako, to Milwaukee in the same transaction that brought Henry Blanco to the Braves. He went 6–10 in 50 games, including 11 starts, and set career-numbers in strikeouts (61) and innings pitched (103 1/3).

In 198 games, Cabrera had a 19–17 record with a 4.95 ERA, four saves, and a 2.04 strikeout-to-walk ratio (192-to-94) in 271.0 innings.

Following his major league career, Cabrera pitched for the Scranton/Wilkes-Barre of the International League during the 2003 season. In 2008, he signed with the Lancaster Barnstormers of the Atlantic League of Professional Baseball.

== See also ==
- List of players from Dominican Republic in Major League Baseball

== Sources ==
- Career statistics from MLB · ESPN · Baseball Reference · Fangraphs · Baseball Reference (Minors) · Retrosheet · Baseball Almanac
- Retrosheet
