= Scott MacRae =

American baseball player (born 1974)

- Pitcher
- Born: August 13, 1974 (age 51); Dearborn, Michigan, U.S.
- Batted: Right Threw: Right

MLB debut
- July 24, 2001, for the Cincinnati Reds

Last MLB appearance
- October 6, 2001, for the Cincinnati Reds

MLB statistics
- Win–loss record: 0–1
- Earned run average: 4.02
- Strikeouts: 18
- Stats at Baseball Reference

Teams
- Cincinnati Reds (2001)

Scott Patrick MacRae (born August 13, 1974) is an American former professional baseball pitcher. He played in Major League Baseball (MLB) for the Cincinnati Reds. He was active in the Cincinnati Reds organization from June 1, 1995, to October 15, 2004, and was active with the Houston Astros March 2, 2005 to October 15, 2005.

== Career ==
During his years of being active, he was often said to be a humorous member of the clubhouse, and was nicknamed "The Golden Ab". He was born in Dearborn, Michigan on August 13, 1974, and attended college at Valdosta State University. He throws and hits right-handed, and was drafted 895th in the 1995 draft. He also served as a Peace Corps volunteer in Zalischyky, Ukraine for over two years teaching elementary students. He was known for mixing up his Ukrainian with his English, and often speaks in Ukrainian while meaning to speak English. He was a coach for the Headfirst baseball program.
