= Justin Atchley =

American baseball player (born 1973)

- Pitcher
- Born: September 5, 1973 (age 52); Sedro-Woolley, Washington, U.S.
- Batted: Left Threw: Left

MLB debut
- April 7, 2001, for the Cincinnati Reds

Last MLB appearance
- July 12, 2001, for the Cincinnati Reds

MLB statistics
- Win–loss record: 0–0
- Earned run average: 6.10
- Strikeouts: 8
- Stats at Baseball Reference

Teams
- Cincinnati Reds (2001)

Justin Scott Atchley (born September 5, 1973) is a former American Major League Baseball pitcher. He played for the Cincinnati Reds during the 2001 season. He attended Sedro-Woolley High School, Texas A&M University and Walla Walla Community College.
