= Kevin Olsen =

American baseball player (born 1976)

- Pitcher
- Born: July 26, 1976 (age 48); Covina, California, U.S.
- Batted: Right Threw: Right

MLB debut
- September 7, 2001, for the Florida Marlins

Last MLB appearance
- September 27, 2003, for the Florida Marlins

MLB statistics
- Win–loss record: 0–5
- Earned run average: 5.12
- Strikeouts: 63
- Stats at Baseball Reference

Teams
- Florida Marlins (2001–2003)

Kevin Gary Olsen (born July 26, 1976) is an American former professional baseball pitcher. He pitched for the Florida Marlins of Major League Baseball (MLB) from 2001–2003 and played his final season in 2007 for the Sacramento River Cats, the Triple-A affiliate of the Oakland Athletics.
