= Mike Gulan =

American baseball player (born 1970)

- Third baseman
- Born: December 18, 1970 (age 55); Steubenville, Ohio, U.S.
- Batted: Right Threw: Right

Professional debut
- MLB: May 14, 1997, for the St. Louis Cardinals
- NPB: March 30, 2002, for the Yokohama BayStars

Last appearance
- MLB: October 6, 2001, for the Florida Marlins
- NPB: August 29, 2002, for the Yokohama BayStars

MLB statistics
- Batting average: .000
- Runs: 3
- Hits: 0

NPB statistics
- Batting average: .226
- Home runs: 10
- Runs batted in: 34
- Stats at Baseball Reference

Teams
- St. Louis Cardinals (1997); Florida Marlins (2001); Yokohama BayStars (2002)

Michael Watts Gulan (born December 18, 1970) is an American former professional baseball third baseman. He played during two seasons at the major league level for the St. Louis Cardinals and Florida Marlins of Major League Baseball (MLB), and for the Yokohama BayStars of Nippon Professional Baseball (NPB).

== Career ==
Gulan was drafted by the Cardinals in the second round of the 1992 MLB draft after playing collegiately at Kent State University from 1990 to 1992. He played his first professional season with their Class A (Short Season) Hamilton Redbirds in 1992, and his last with the White Sox' rookie league team, the Bristol White Sox, in 2004.
