= Chris Piersoll =

American baseball pitcher (born 1977)

- Pitcher
- Born: September 25, 1977; Van Nuys, California
- Batted: Right Threw: Right

MLB debut
- August 31, 2001, for the Cincinnati Reds

Last MLB appearance
- October 7, 2001, for the Cincinnati Reds

MLB statistics
- Games played: 11
- Earned run average: 2.38
- Strikeouts: 7
- Stats at Baseball Reference

Teams
- Cincinnati Reds (2001)

Christopher Earl Piersoll (born September 25, 1977) is a former pitcher in Minor League Baseball. He played for the Cincinnati Reds.
