= Robin Jennings =

American baseball player (born 1972)

- Right fielder
- Born: April 11, 1972 (age 53); Singapore
- Batted: Left Threw: Left

MLB debut
- April 18, 1996, for the Chicago Cubs

Last MLB appearance
- October 7, 2001, for the Cincinnati Reds

MLB statistics
- Batting average: .244
- Home runs: 3
- Runs batted in: 24
- Stats at Baseball Reference

Teams
- Chicago Cubs (1996–1997, 1999); Oakland Athletics (2001); Colorado Rockies (2001); Cincinnati Reds (2001)

Robin Christopher Jennings (born April 11, 1972) is a Singaporean-born American former professional baseball outfielder. He played in Major League Baseball (MLB) for the Chicago Cubs, Oakland Athletics, Colorado Rockies, and Cincinnati Reds.

He is the only person born in Singapore to play in MLB. He was born in Singapore while his father worked for the United States Foreign Service and later lived in Switzerland, France and Indonesia.

Drafted by the Cubs in the 33rd round of the 1991 Major League Baseball draft, Jennings made his Major League Baseball debut on April 18, 1996, and appeared in his final game on October 7, 2001. He played in a total of 93 games, batting .244 in 213 at-bats, with three home runs and 24 runs batted in (RBI).

He was traded twice in July 2001. The Oakland Athletics sent him to the Colorado Rockies for Ron Gant on July 3. He played in only one game for the Rockies, and was traded to the Cincinnati Reds on July 19.
