= Lance Davis =

American baseball player (born 1976)

- Pitcher
- Born: September 1, 1976 (age 49); Winter Haven, Florida, U.S.
- Batted: Right Threw: Left

MLB debut
- June 16, 2001, for the Cincinnati Reds

Last MLB appearance
- October 6, 2001, for the Cincinnati Reds

MLB statistics
- Win–loss record: 8–4
- Earned run average: 4.74
- Strikeouts: 53
- Stats at Baseball Reference

Teams
- Cincinnati Reds (2001)

Johnny Lance Davis (born September 1, 1976) is an American former Major League Baseball starting pitcher. He last played in 2008 for the Long Island Ducks of the independent Atlantic League. He is the career wins leader for the Ducks with 28 wins. He briefly played for the Cincinnati Reds in 2001.

Davis was drafted by the Cincinnati Reds in the 16th round of the 1996 draft. He made his professional debut with the Princeton Reds. In 15 games, he had a 3–7 record with a 3.88 earned run average. Davis started 20 games for the Reds in 2001, going 8–4. After the 2002 season, Davis became a free agent, but re-signed with the Reds. He split the year between the Double-A Chattanooga Lookouts and Triple-A Louisville Bats. Again a free agent after the season, he signed with the Long Island Ducks.

Davis pitched well enough with the Ducks to have his contract purchased by the New York Yankees on August 2, 2004. He appeared in 8 games for the Triple-A Columbus Clippers before being released by the Yankees a month and a half after they purchased his contract. In 2005, he again pitched for the Ducks, recording a 3.76 ERA and being elected to the Atlantic League All-star game.

On January 2, 2006, Davis signed with the Detroit Tigers. He played for Single-A Lakeland, Double-A Erie, and Triple-A Toledo. In 2007, Davis started his third stint with the Ducks, going 9–4 in 18 games. On July 31, 2008, Davis signed with the Ducks for a fourth stint.
