= Scott Sobkowiak =

American baseball player (born 1977)

- Pitcher
- Born: October 26, 1977 (age 48); Woodstock, Illinois
- Batted: Right Threw: Right

MLB debut
- October 7, 2001, for the Atlanta Braves

Last MLB appearance
- October 7, 2001, for the Atlanta Braves

MLB statistics
- Win–loss record: 0–0
- Earned run average: 9.00
- Strikeouts: 0

CPBL statistics
- Win–loss record: 1–2
- Earned run average: 4.13
- Strikeouts: 14
- Stats at Baseball Reference

Teams
- Atlanta Braves (2001); Chinatrust Whales (2005)

Scott David Sobkowiak (born October 26, 1977) is a former Major League Baseball pitcher who played one game for the Atlanta Braves in 2001.

Sobkowiak attended the University of Northern Iowa, and in 1997 he played collegiate summer baseball with the Falmouth Commodores of the Cape Cod Baseball League. He was selected by Atlanta in the 7th round of the 1998 MLB draft.

On October 7, 2001, Sobkowiak made his only major league appearance, against the Florida Marlins, giving up one earned run in one inning pitched. In 2002, he played in the Braves' minor leagues and in four games for the Cincinnati Reds High-A affiliate in 2003, before he began his independent league career.

In 2003 and 2004, Sobkowiak played in the independent Frontier League for the Rockford RiverHawks as a starting pitcher. In 2005, he went 8-7 for the Somerset Patriots of the independent Atlantic League. From 2006-2007, he played for the Atlantic League's Lancaster Barnstormers and went a combined 9-10.
