= John Burkett =

American baseball player (born 1964)

- Pitcher
- Born: November 28, 1964 (age 61); New Brighton, Pennsylvania, U.S.
- Batted: Right Threw: Right

MLB debut
- September 15, 1987, for the San Francisco Giants

Last MLB appearance
- September 26, 2003, for the Boston Red Sox

MLB statistics
- Win–loss record: 166–136
- Earned run average: 4.31
- Strikeouts: 1,766
- Stats at Baseball Reference

Teams
- San Francisco Giants (1987, 1990–1994); Florida Marlins (1995–1996); Texas Rangers (1996–1999); Atlanta Braves (2000–2001); Boston Red Sox (2002–2003)

Career highlights and awards
- 2× All-Star (1993, 2001); NL wins leader (1993); San Francisco Giants Wall of Fame

John David Burkett (born November 28, 1964) is an American former Major League Baseball pitcher. He compiled 166 wins against 136 losses, 1,766 strikeouts, and a 4.31 earned run average. He pitched from 1987 to 2003, with the San Francisco Giants, Florida Marlins, Texas Rangers, Atlanta Braves and Boston Red Sox.

Burkett is also a professional bowler currently competing on the PBA50 and PBA60 Tours.

== Early life ==
John David Burkett was born on November 28, 1964, in New Brighton, Pennsylvania. He attended Beaver High School in Beaver, Pennsylvania, where he excelled in baseball.

== Professional career ==
=== Draft and minor leagues ===
Burkett was drafted in the sixth round of the 1983 Amateur Baseball Draft by the San Francisco Giants.

=== San Francisco Giants (1987, 1990–1994) ===
Burkett made his debut for the Giants late in the 1987 season, and pitched six innings in the majors. He was returned to the minors, where he remained for the next two years. His first full season for the Giants was 1990, during which he went 14–7 with a 3.79 ERA in 204 innings. On September 4, 1990, Burkett picked up his one and only save at the major league level. He pitched 3 shutout innings to close out a 6–4 Giants victory over the Padres, saving the game for starting pitcher Mike LaCoss.

Burkett's best season came in 1993 when he went 22–7 with a 3.65 ERA for the Giants. Burkett was a National League All-Star in 1993, his 22 wins led the major leagues, and he finished fourth in the NL Cy Young Award voting.

=== Florida Marlins (1995–1996) ===
Burkett pitched for the Florida Marlins from 1995 to 1996.

=== Texas Rangers (1996–1999) ===
His 1996 postseason complete game win for the Texas Rangers over the eventual World Series Champion New York Yankees was the first complete game in Divisional Series history. It was the first postseason game, and therefore the first postseason win, in Rangers history. Their second postseason win was not until 2010.

=== Atlanta Braves (2000–2001) ===
After being released in Spring Training by the Tampa Bay Devil Rays in 2000, Burkett was picked up by the Atlanta Braves and resurrected a career thought by many to be over. His 3.04 ERA ranked third in all of MLB for 2001, he struck out a career-high 187 batters, and he was selected for his second NL All-Star Game that season. Despite the Braves winning their division that season, poor run support in Burkett's starts led to a modest 12–12 record. Burkett won Game 3 of the 2001 NL Divisional Series against the Houston Astros, allowing two runs in 6 1/3 innings. He was given the nickname "Sheets" during his days with the Atlanta Braves because of his betting and organizing pools for games in the clubhouse.

=== Boston Red Sox (2002–2003) ===
The 38-year old Burkett retired following the 2003 season after going 25–17 over two seasons with the Boston Red Sox. His final appearance was in Game 6 of the 2003 American League Championship Series, and his time in a major league uniform ended when Aaron Boone hit a famous walk-off home run the next day.

Although a weak hitter at the plate, batting just .093 (50-for-540) with only 18 RBI, Burkett was above average defensively. He recorded a .982 fielding percentage with only 9 errors in 500 total chances in 2,648.1 innings pitched. His career fielding percentage was 26 points higher than the league average at his position.

== Pitching style ==
Burkett was a control pitcher who posted strikeout rates below the major league average. His fastball topped out at just 90 MPH, but he had an effective curveball and changeup. He allowed walks and home runs at a rate below major league averages, and his career ground ball-fly ball ratio of 0.83 was slightly better than the major league average during that time of 0.78.

== Professional bowling ==
Burkett is also a part-time professional bowler, and has 32 perfect games to his credit. He cashed in several PBA Tour events during his baseball days, and joined the PBA50 Tour (formerly PBA Senior Tour) in 2015. His best finish in the 2015 season was fourth at PBA50 Northern California Classic, and he cashed eight times in 16 events. His 2016 campaign was cut short when he had right ankle surgery. 2017 PBA50 season top finishes were 11th in PBA50 National Championship, 24th at the Senior US Open, 11th at Dave Small's Championship Lanes Classic, and 9th at the DeHayes Insurance Group Championship. On August 18, 2019, Burkett won a PBA Regional Tour event at the PBA Houston Emerald Bowl Southwest Challenge in Houston, Texas, which was his first PBA title of any kind.

On July 28, 2022, Burkett won his first national PBA50 Tour championship at the PBA50 South Shore Classic held at Olympia Lanes in Hammond, Indiana. Qualifying as the #3 seed, he defeated PBA Hall of Famer Parker Bohn III in his first match, then went on to knock off USBC Hall of Famer Lennie Boresch Jr. and three-time PBA Tour titlist Eugene McCune to earn the title. On July 5, 2025, Burkett won his second national PBA title at the PBA60 Roth Championship in Columbus, Ohio.

Burkett has stated he always felt he was a better bowler than a baseball player, but after being drafted to play professional baseball, he decided to take that path first.

== Personal life ==
He has three children: Avery, Maxwell and Reid.
