= 1996 Milwaukee Brewers season =

1996 Milwaukee Brewers
- League: American League
- Division: Central
- Ballpark: Milwaukee County Stadium
- City: Milwaukee, Wisconsin, United States
- Record: 80–82 (.494)
- Divisional place: 3rd
- Owners: Bud Selig
- General managers: Sal Bando
- Managers: Phil Garner
- Television: WVTV (Jim Paschke, Bill Schroeder)
- Radio: WTMJ (AM) (Bob Uecker, Jim Powell)

The 1996 Milwaukee Brewers season was the 27th season for the Brewers in Milwaukee, and their 28th overall. The Brewers finished third in the American League Central with a record of 80 wins and 82 losses. The team scored a franchise record 894 runs.

== Offseason ==
- January 23, 1996: Ben McDonald was signed as a free agent by the Brewers.

== Regular season ==
=== Season standings ===
AL Central
Team	W	L	Pct.	GB	Home	Road
Cleveland Indians	99	62	.615	—	51‍–‍29	48‍–‍33
Chicago White Sox	85	77	.525	14½	44‍–‍37	41‍–‍40
Milwaukee Brewers	80	82	.494	19½	38‍–‍43	42‍–‍39
Minnesota Twins	78	84	.481	21½	39‍–‍43	39‍–‍41
Kansas City Royals	75	86	.466	24	37‍–‍43	38‍–‍43

=== Record vs. opponents ===
1996 American League record Source: MLB Standings Grid – 1996
Team	BAL	BOS	CAL	CWS	CLE	DET	KC	MIL	MIN	NYY	OAK	SEA	TEX	TOR
Baltimore	—	7–6	6–6	4–8	5–7	11–2	9–3	9–3	7–5	3–10	9–4	7–5	3–10–1	8–5
Boston	6–7	—	8–4	6–6	1–11	12–1	3–9	7–5	6–6	7–6	8–5	7–6	6–6	8–5
California	6–6	4–8	—	6–6	4–9	6–6	4–8	7–5	4–8	7–6	6–7	5–8	4–9	7–5
Chicago	8–4	6–6	6–6	—	5–8	10–3	7–6	6–7	6–7	6–7	5–7	5–7	8–4	7–5
Cleveland	7–5	11–1	9–4	8–5	—	12–0	7–6	7–6	10–3	3–9	6–6	8–4	4–8	7–5
Detroit	2–11	1–12	6–6	3–10	0–12	—	6–6	4–8	6–6	5–8	4–8	6–6	4–9	6–7
Kansas City	3–9	9–3	8–4	6–7	6–7	6–6	—	4–9	6–7	4–8	5–7	7–5	6–6	5–8
Milwaukee	3–9	5–7	5–7	7–6	6–7	8–4	9–4	—	9–4	6–6	7–5	4–9	6–7	5–7
Minnesota	5–7	6–6	8–4	7–6	3–10	6–6	7–6	4–9	—	5–7	6–7	6–6	7–5	8–5
New York	10–3	6–7	6–7	7–6	9–3	8–5	8–4	6–6	7–5	—	9–3	3–9	5–7	8–5
Oakland	4–9	5–8	7–6	7–5	6–6	8–4	7–5	5–7	7–6	3–9	—	8–5	7–6	4–8
Seattle	5–7	6–7	8–5	7–5	4–8	6–6	5–7	9–4	6–6	9–3	5–8	—	10–3	5–7
Texas	10–3–1	6–6	9–4	4–8	8–4	9–4	6–6	7–6	5–7	7–5	6–7	3–10	—	10–2
Toronto	5–8	5–8	5–7	5–7	5–7	7–6	8–5	7–5	5–8	5–8	8–4	7–5	2–10	—

=== Game log ===
1996 Game Log: 80–82 (Home: 38–43; Away: 42–39)
April: 12–12 (Home: 6–6; Away: 6–6)

#	Date	Opponent	Score	Win	Loss	Save	Attendance	Record
1	April 2	@ Angels	15–9	**Wickander** (1–0)	Finley	—	27,836	1–0
2	April 3	@ Angels	2–3 (11)	James	**Lloyd** (0–1)	—	15,024	1–1
3	April 5	@ Mariners	10–6	**Karl** (1–0)	Hurtado	—	27,768	2–1
4	April 6	@ Mariners	5–8	Johnson	**Sparks** (0–1)	—	56,892	2–2
5	April 7	@ Mariners	1–3	Hitchcock	**Bones** (0–1)	Jackson	21,004	2–3
6	April 9	Athletics	10–4	**McDonald** (1–0)	Van Poppel	—	42,090	3–3
7	April 11	Athletics	0–11	Johns	**Karl** (1–1)	—	12,236	3–4
8	April 12	Royals	1–4	Appier	**Bones** (0–2)	Montgomery	7,113	3–5
9	April 13	Royals	2–3	Gubicza	**Sparks** (0–2)	Montgomery	9,224	3–6
10	April 14	Royals	5–2	**McDonald** (2–0)	Haney	**Miranda** (1)	19,131	4–6
11	April 16	Yankees	6–3	**Karl** (2–1)	Key	—	7,059	5–6
12	April 17	Yankees	8–4	**Bones** (1–2)	Cone	—	7,124	6–6
13	April 18	@ Royals	8–2	**Sparks** (1–2)	Gubicza	—	13,153	7–6
14	April 19	@ Royals	8–2	**McDonald** (3–0)	Haney	—	15,321	8–6
15	April 20	@ Royals	12–4	**Miranda** (1–0)	Jacome	—	17,220	9–6
16	April 21	@ Royals	5–4	**Wickander** (2–0)	Pichardo	**Fetters** (1)	14,666	10–6
17	April 22	@ Athletics	2–6	Reyes	**Bones** (1–3)	Briscoe	6,021	10–7
18	April 23	@ Athletics	6–9	Wojciechowski	**Sparks** (1–3)	Mohler	7,026	10–8
19	April 24	Angels	3–4	Boskie	**McDonald** (3–1)	Percival	7,051	10–9
20	April 25	Angels	6–5	**Fetters** (1–0)	James	—	6,707	11–9
21	April 26	Mariners	5–6	Carmona	**Potts** (0–1)	Charlton	13,072	11–10
22	April 27	Mariners	5–6	Wells	**Bones** (1–4)	Charlton	17,270	11–11
23	April 28	Mariners	16–9	**Potts** (1–1)	Davis	—	19,717	12–11
24	April 30	@ Blue Jays	8–9	Crabtree	**Boze** (0–1)	—	25,467	12–12

May: 11–16 (Home: 5–7; Away: 6–9)

#	Date	Opponent	Score	Win	Loss	Save	Attendance	Record
25	May 1	@ Blue Jays	3–9	Guzman	**Miranda** (1–1)	—	25,684	12–13
26	May 2	@ Blue Jays	5–7	Hanson	**Karl** (2–2)	Timlin	31,299	12–14
27	May 3	@ Orioles	2–8	Erickson	**Bones** (1–5)	—	41,037	12–15
28	May 4	@ Orioles	5–10	Mussina	**Sparks** (1–4)	—	44,175	12–16
29	May 5	@ Orioles	13–1	**McDonald** (4–1)	Haynes	—	46,027	13–16
30	May 7	Red Sox	2–4	Clemens	**Miranda** (1–2)	Slocumb	7,039	13–17
31	May 9	Red Sox	17–2	**Bones** (2–5)	Sele	—	7,379	14–17
32	May 10	Orioles	7–10 (12)	Orosco	**Garcia** (0–1)	McDowell	9,520	14–18
33	May 11	Orioles	3–5 (10)	Rhodes	**Potts** (1–2)	Myers	21,081	14–19
34	May 12	Orioles	6–4	**Miranda** (2–2)	Erickson	**Fetters** (2)	14,333	15–19
35	May 13	White Sox	6–2	**Sparks** (2–4)	Baldwin	**Boze** (1)	9,544	16–19
36	May 15	White Sox	8–20	Alvarez	**Bones** (2–6)	Keyser	8,733	16–20
37	May 16	White Sox	3–2	**Lloyd** (1–1)	Tapani	**Fetters** (3)	13,849	17–20
38	May 17	@ Twins	12–1	**Karl** (3–2)	Parra	—	26,733	18–20
39	May 18	@ Twins	7–3	**Miranda** (3–2)	Mahomes	**Fetters** (4)	30,593	19–20
40	May 19	@ Twins	4–2	**Sparks** (3–4)	Robertson	**Fetters** (5)	24,411	20–20
41	May 20	@ Twins	3–2	**Bones** (3–6)	Rodriguez	**Fetters** (6)	13,376	21–20
42	May 21	@ Indians	5–6	Tavarez	**Boze** (0–2)	—	39,974	21–21
43	May 22	@ Indians	10–8	**Karl** (4–2)	McDowell	**Fetters** (7)	41,027	22–21
44	May 23	@ Indians	1–5	Hershiser	**Miranda** (3–3)	—	42,395	22–22
45	May 24	@ White Sox	3–4	Thomas	**Sparks** (3–5)	Hernandez	18,346	22–23
46	May 25	@ White Sox	7–9	Alvarez	**Bones** (3–7)	Hernandez	20,585	22–24
47	May 26	@ White Sox	1–12	Tapani	**McDonald** (4–2)	—	21,151	22–25
48	May 28	Twins	7–3	**Karl** (5–2)	Mahomes	**Garcia** (1)	10,117	23–25
49	May 29	Twins	7–8 (12)	Hansell	**Lloyd** (1–2)	—	14,324	23–26
50	May 30	Indians	0–2	Nagy	**Bones** (3–8)	Mesa	11,543	23–27
51	May 31	Indians	4–10	Martinez	**McDonald** (4–3)	—	24,050	23–28

June: 17–11 (Home: 10–6; Away: 7–5)

#	Date	Opponent	Score	Win	Loss	Save	Attendance	Record
52	June 1	Indians	2–1	**Garcia** (1–1)	McDowell	**Fetters** (8)	22,004	24–28
53	June 2	Indians	6–11	Poole	**Karl** (5–3)	—	21,150	24–29
54	June 3	Rangers	6–9	Witt	**Sparks** (3–6)	Henneman	9,748	24–30
55	June 4	Rangers	6–2	**Bones** (4–8)	Gross	—	10,685	25–30
56	June 5	Rangers	6–4	**McDonald** (5–3)	Hill	**Fetters** (9)	11,276	26–30
57	June 7	@ Red Sox	7–10	Garces	**Garcia** (1–2)	Slocumb	26,861	26–31
58	June 8	@ Red Sox	3–2 (10)	**Lloyd** (2–2)	Hudson	**Fetters** (10)	30,399	27–31
59	June 9	@ Red Sox	11–8 (10)	**Burrows** (1–0)	Slocumb	**Fetters** (11)	28,120	28–31
60	June 10	@ Rangers	3–8	Gross	**Givens** (0–1)	—	43,275	28–32
61	June 11	@ Rangers	14–4	**McDonald** (6–3)	Hill	**Garcia** (2)	33,519	29–32
62	June 12	@ Rangers	6–13	Pavlik	**Miranda** (3–4)	—	34,842	29–33
63	June 13	Athletics	16–3	**Karl** (6–3)	Wojciechowski	—	12,439	30–33
64	June 14	Athletics	6–2	**Bones** (5–8)	Wasdin	—	14,404	31–33
65	June 15	Athletics	12–9	**Givens** (1–1)	Wengert	**Garcia** (3)	21,064	32–33
66	June 16	Athletics	9–10	Taylor	**Fetters** (1–1)	Mohler	26,744	32–34
67	June 17	Royals	9–4	**Burrows** (2–0)	Appier	—	9,315	33–34
68	June 18	Royals	9–1	**Karl** (7–3)	Linton	**Potts** (1)	9,116	34–34
69	June 19	Royals	4–8 (10)	Pichardo	**Mercedes** (0–1)	—	13,431	34–35
70	June 20	Angels	3–10	Langston	**Givens** (1–2)	—	16,034	34–36
71	June 21	Angels	10–5	**McDonald** (7–3)	Abbott	—	16,274	35–36
72	June 22	Angels	4–6	Boskie	**Miranda** (3–5)	Percival	35,464	35–37
73	June 23	Angels	8–4	**Garcia** (2–2)	Finley	—	17,051	36–37
74	June 25	@ Royals	5–3	**Bones** (6–8)	Gubicza	**Fetters** (12)	14,448	37–37
75	June 26	@ Royals	3–7	Haney	**Givens** (1–3)	—	14,560	37–38
76	June 27	@ Royals	6–2	**McDonald** (8–3)	Belcher	—	17,670	38–38
77	June 28	@ Blue Jays	5–1	**D'Amico** (1–0)	Guzman	**Fetters** (13)	31,333	39–38
78	June 29	@ Blue Jays	7–4	**Karl** (8–3)	Janzen	—	31,170	40–38
79	June 30	@ Blue Jays	2–15	Hanson	**Bones** (6–9)	—	30,104	40–39

July: 12–16 (Home: 7–7; Away: 5–9)

#	Date	Opponent	Score	Win	Loss	Save	Attendance	Record
80	July 1	@ Tigers	2–0	**Sparks** (4–6)	Olivares	**Fetters** (14)	10,727	41–39
81	July 2	@ Tigers	2–1 (11)	**Garcia** (3–2)	Sager	**Fetters** (15)	9,455	42–39
82	July 3	@ Tigers	5–8	Williams	**D'Amico** (1–1)	—	11,047	42–40
83	July 4	@ Yankees	1–4	Pettitte	**Karl** (8–4)	Wetteland	24,243	42–41
84	July 5	@ Yankees	3–12	Gooden	**Bones** (6–10)	—	26,699	42–42
85	July 6	@ Yankees	0–2	Key	**Sparks** (4–7)	Wetteland	24,033	42–43
86	July 7	@ Yankees	4–1	**McDonald** (9–3)	Rogers	**Fetters** (16)	35,242	43–43
87	July 11	Blue Jays	3–6	Guzman	**D'Amico** (1–2)	Castillo	16,019	43–44
88	July 12	Blue Jays	12–5	**McDonald** (10–3)	Hanson	—	15,691	44–44
89	July 13	Blue Jays	7–15	Hentgen	**Karl** (8–5)	—	29,383	44–45
90	July 14	Blue Jays	5–7 (10)	Crabtree	**Garcia** (3–3)	Timlin	20,798	44–46
91	July 15	Tigers	9–10	Sager	**Bones** (6–11)	Olson	15,819	44–47
92	July 16	Tigers	20–7	**D'Amico** (2–2)	Williams	—	12,476	45–47
93	July 17	Tigers	3–2 (10)	**Fetters** (2–1)	Urbani	—	21,121	46–47
94	July 18	Yankees	16–4	**Karl** (9–5)	Gooden	—	19,079	47–47
95	July 19	Yankees	7–5	**Eldred** (1–0)	Pettitte	**Fetters** (17)	19,300	48–47
96	July 20	Yankees	2–4	Rivera	**Van Egmond** (0–1)	Wetteland	25,473	48–48
97	July 21	Yankees	3–2	**D'Amico** (3–2)	Key	**Fetters** (18)	25,662	49–48
98	July 22	@ Mariners	3–8	Wagner	**Mercedes** (0–2)	—	40,555	49–49
99	July 23	@ Mariners	7–3	**Karl** (10–5)	Carmona	—	22,378	50–49
100	July 24	@ Mariners	7–8	Ayala	**Fetters** (2–2)	—	19,899	50–50
101	July 25	@ Angels	4–5	Holtz	**Lloyd** (2–3)	—	16,841	50–51
102	July 26	@ Angels	5–6	Springer	**D'Amico** (3–3)	Percival	18,189	50–52
103	July 27	@ Angels	0–7	Finley	**McDonald** (10–4)	—	17,497	50–53
104	July 28	@ Angels	4–3 (13)	**Miranda** (4–5)	Holtz	**Garcia** (4)	25,539	51–53
105	July 30	Mariners	5–6	Wells	**Eldred** (1–1)	Ayala	—	51–54
106	July 30	Mariners	4–3	**Van Egmond** (1–1)	Wolcott	**Fetters** (19)	18,591	52–54
107	July 31	Mariners	3–9	Hitchcock	**D'Amico** (3–4)	—	30,772	52–55

August: 14–16 (Home: 5–10; Away: 9–6)

#	Date	Opponent	Score	Win	Loss	Save	Attendance	Record
108	August 1	Mariners	2–9	Moyer	**McDonald** (10–5)	—	18,425	52–56
109	August 2	@ Athletics	4–3 (10)	**Miranda** (5–5)	Taylor	**Fetters** (20)	10,056	53–56
110	August 3	@ Athletics	7–0	**Bones** (7–11)	Johns	—	15,171	54–56
111	August 4	@ Athletics	2–4	Telgheder	**Van Egmond** (1–2)	Taylor	10,281	54–57
112	August 5	@ Athletics	13–3	**Eldred** (2–1)	Adams	—	8,616	55–57
113	August 6	Orioles	3–13	Mussina	**McDonald** (10–6)	—	17,075	55–58
114	August 7	Orioles	2–12	Erickson	**Karl** (10–6)	—	20,287	55–59
115	August 8	Orioles	4–6	Coppinger	**D'Amico** (3–5)	Myers	18,620	55–60
116	August 9	Red Sox	7–9	Suppan	**Van Egmond** (1–3)	Slocumb	—	55–61
117	August 9	Red Sox	1–4	Eshelman	**Bones** (7–12)	Belinda	19,541	55–62
118	August 10	Red Sox	2–3	Wakefield	**Eldred** (2–2)	—	20,297	55–63
119	August 11	Red Sox	0–2	Clemens	**McDonald** (10–7)	Belinda	19,178	55–64
120	August 13	@ Orioles	3–4	Corbin	**Lloyd** (2–4)	Myers	44,461	55–65
121	August 14	@ Orioles	5–8	Milchin	**Bones** (7–13)	Myers	47,480	55–66
122	August 16	White Sox	9–7	**Miranda** (6–5)	Levine	**Villone** (1)	—	56–66
123	August 16	White Sox	3–2	**Van Egmond** (2–3)	Tapani	**Fetters** (21)	25,529	57–66
124	August 17	White Sox	2–6	Fernandez	**McDonald** (10–8)	Hernandez	31,551	57–67
125	August 18	White Sox	8–7	**Miranda** (7–5)	Darwin	**Fetters** (22)	33,094	58–67
126	August 19	@ Twins	6–1	**D'Amico** (4–5)	Rodriguez	—	21,879	59–67
127	August 20	@ Twins	7–12	Parra	**Bones** (7–14)	—	14,630	59–68
128	August 21	@ Twins	10–7	**Jones** (1–0)	Stevens	**Fetters** (23)	15,885	60–68
129	August 23	@ Indians	6–5 (11)	**Jones** (2–0)	Mesa	**Fetters** (24)	42,405	61–68
130	August 24	@ Indians	4–3 (10)	**Wickman** (1–0)	Plunk	**Fetters** (25)	42,437	62–68
131	August 25	@ Indians	5–8	Shuey	**Miranda** (7–6)	Mesa	42,335	62–69
132	August 26	@ White Sox	3–2	**Eldred** (3–2)	Alvarez	**Jones** (1)	19,637	63–69
133	August 27	@ White Sox	4–2	**Van Egmond** (3–3)	Fernandez	**Fetters** (26)	15,443	64–69
134	August 28	@ White Sox	0–2	Baldwin	**McDonald** (10–9)	Hernandez	17,269	64–70
135	August 29	Twins	1–6	Rodriguez	**Karl** (10–7)	—	14,922	64–71
136	August 30	Twins	5–4 (12)	**Wickman** (2–0)	Parra	—	17,444	65–71
137	August 31	Twins	3–2	**Jones** (3–0)	Robertson	**Fetters** (27)	20,187	66–71

September: 14–11 (Home: 5–7; Away: 9–4)

#	Date	Opponent	Score	Win	Loss	Save	Attendance	Record
138	September 1	Twins	2–6	Aldred	**Van Egmond** (3–4)	—	17,074	66–72
139	September 2	Indians	7–6	**Jones** (4–0)	Mesa	—	18,015	67–72
140	September 3	Indians	8–2	**Karl** (11–7)	Hershiser	—	10,599	68–72
141	September 4	Indians	0–7	Ogea	**D'Amico** (4–6)	—	12,666	68–73
142	September 6	Rangers	3–7	Burkett	**Eldred** (3–3)	—	16,714	68–74
143	September 7	Rangers	1–2	Hill	**McDonald** (10–10)	Henneman	19,110	68–75
144	September 8	Rangers	1–7	Witt	**Florie** (0–1)	—	17,542	68–76
145	September 9	@ Red Sox	6–0	**Karl** (12–7)	Gordon	—	22,386	69–76
146	September 10	@ Red Sox	11–10	**Garcia** (4–3)	Hudson	**Fetters** (28)	20,487	70–76
147	September 11	@ Red Sox	1–4	Wakefield	**Eldred** (3–4)	Slocumb	21,310	70–77
148	September 12	@ Rangers	15–4	**McDonald** (11–10)	Hill	—	41,303	71–77
149	September 13	@ Rangers	6–3	**D'Amico** (5–6)	Witt	**Fetters** (29)	39,235	72–77
150	September 14	@ Rangers	8–6	**Karl** (13–7)	Pavlik	**Fetters** (30)	45,901	73–77
151	September 15	@ Rangers	2–6	Oliver	**Garcia** (4–4)	Vosberg	45,941	73–78
152	September 17	Blue Jays	4–0	**McDonald** (12–10)	Andujar	—	10,184	74–78
153	September 18	Blue Jays	2–1	**Fetters** (3–2)	Timlin	—	9,550	75–78
154	September 20	Tigers	1–10	Sager	**Karl** (13–8)	—	15,046	75–79
155	September 21	Tigers	13–6	**D'Amico** (6–6)	Van Poppel	**Villone** (2)	33,106	76–79
156	September 22	Tigers	5–7	Lima	**Fetters** (3–3)	—	15,705	76–80
157	September 23	@ Orioles	8–7 (10)	**Jones** (5–0)	Mathews	**Fetters** (31)	46,542	77–80
158	September 25	@ Yankees	2–19	Cone	**Van Egmond** (3–5)	—	—	77–81
159	September 25	@ Yankees	2–6	Rogers	**Karl** (13–9)	—	37,947	77–82
160	September 27	@ Tigers	7–6 (6)	**Wickman** (3–0)	Van Poppel	—	8,606	78–82
161	September 28	@ Tigers	7–2	**Eldred** (4–4)	Moehler	—	12,939	79–82
162	September 29	@ Tigers	7–5 (10)	**Reyes** (1–0)	Cummings	**Fetters** (32)	13,038	80–82

Legend: = Win = Loss
Bold = Brewers team member

=== Detailed records ===
American League
Opponent	W	L	WP	RS	RA
AL East
Baltimore Orioles	3	9	0.250	61	88
Boston Red Sox	5	7	0.417	68	58
Detroit Tigers	8	4	0.667	81	64
New York Yankees	6	6	0.500	54	66
Toronto Blue Jays	5	7	0.417	63	79
Total	27	33	0.450	327	355
AL Central
Chicago White Sox	7	6	0.538	57	77
Cleveland Indians	6	7	0.462	58	74
Kansas City Royals	9	4	0.692	77	46
**Milwaukee Brewers**					
Minnesota Twins	9	4	0.692	74	57
Total	31	21	0.596	266	254
AL West
California Angels	5	7	0.417	64	67
Oakland Athletics	7	5	0.583	87	64
Seattle Mariners	4	9	0.308	73	84
Texas Rangers	6	7	0.462	77	75
Total	22	28	0.440	301	290
Season Total	80	82	0.494	894	899

Month	Games	Won	Lost	Win %	RS	RA
April	24	12	12	0.500	149	126
May	27	11	16	0.407	151	159
June	28	17	11	0.607	188	166
July	28	12	16	0.429	146	153
August	30	14	16	0.467	131	156
September	25	14	11	0.560	129	139
Total	162	80	82	0.494	894	899

	Games	Won	Lost	Win %	RS	RA
Home	81	38	43	0.469	451	460
Away	81	42	39	0.519	443	439
Total	162	80	82	0.494	894	899

=== Notable transactions ===
- July 31, 1996: Greg Vaughn and a player to be named later were traded by the Brewers to the San Diego Padres for Marc Newfield, Bryce Florie and Ron Villone. The Brewers completed the deal by sending Gerald Parent (minors) to the Padres on September 16.
- August 23, 1996: Pat Listach, Graeme Lloyd and a player to be named later were traded by the Brewers to the New York Yankees for Bob Wickman and Gerald Williams. The Brewers completed the deal by sending Ricky Bones to the Yankees on August 29.

=== Roster ===
1996 Milwaukee Brewers
**Roster**
**Pitchers**: 25 Ricky Bones; 48 Marshall Boze; 39 Terry Burrows; 46 Cris Carpenter; 33 Jeff D'Amico; 21 Cal Eldred; 36 Mike Fetters; 39 Bryce Florie; 51 Ramón García; 13 Brian Givens; 43 Doug Jones; 42 Scott Karl; 43 Mark Kiefer; 37 Graeme Lloyd; 40 Ben McDonald; 41 José Mercedes; 38 Ángel Miranda; 49 Mike Potts; 47 Al Reyes; 50 Steve Sparks; 31 Tim Van Egmond; 49 Ron Villone; 52 Kevin Wickander; 37 Bob Wickman	**Catchers**: 16 Jesse Levis; 22 Mike Matheny; 11 Kelly Stinnett; **Infielders**: 26 Jeff Cirillo; 32 John Jaha; 8 Mark Loretta; 34 Michael Santiago-Smith; 20 Kevin Seitzer; 9 Tim Unroe; 2 José Valentín; 1 Fernando Viña	**Outfielders**: 7 Brian Banks; 20 Jeromy Burnitz; 24 Chuck Carr; 18 Todd Dunn; 15 David Hulse; 18 Kevin Koslofski; 4 Pat Listach; 30 Matt Mieske; 10 Marc Newfield; 14 Dave Nilsson; 7 Danny Perez; 23 Greg Vaughn; 27 Turner Ward; 29 Gerald Williams	**Manager**: 3 Phil Garner; **Coaches**: 12 Chris Bando (Third Base); 35 Bill Castro (Bullpen); 17 Jim Gantner (First Base); 28 Lamar Johnson (Hitting); 45 Don Rowe (Pitching)

== Player stats ==
=== Batting ===
==== Starters by position ====
Note: Pos = Position; G = Games played; AB = At bats; H = Hits; Avg. = Batting average; HR = Home runs; RBI = Runs batted in

Pos	Player	G	AB	H	Avg.	HR	RBI
C	Mike Matheny	106	313	64	.204	8	46
1B	John Jaha	148	543	163	.300	34	118
2B	Fernando Viña	140	554	157	.283	7	46
SS	José Valentín	154	552	143	.259	24	95
3B	Jeff Cirillo	158	566	184	.325	15	83
LF	Greg Vaughn	102	375	105	.280	31	95
CF	Pat Listach	87	317	76	.240	1	33
RF	Matt Mieske	127	374	104	.278	14	64
DH	Kevin Seitzer	132	490	155	.316	12	62

==== Other batters ====
Note: G = Games played; AB = At bats; H = Hits; Avg. = Batting average; HR = Home runs; RBI = Runs batted in

Player	G	AB	H	Avg.	HR	RBI
Dave Nilsson	123	453	150	.331	17	84
Jesse Levis	104	233	55	.236	1	21
Marc Newfield	49	179	55	.307	7	31
Mark Loretta	73	154	43	.279	1	13
David Hulse	81	117	26	.222	0	6
Chuck Carr	27	106	29	.274	1	11
Gerald Williams	26	92	19	.207	0	4
Jeromy Burnitz	23	72	17	.236	2	14
Turner Ward	43	67	12	.179	2	10
Kevin Koslofski	25	42	9	.214	0	6
Kelly Stinnett	14	26	2	.077	0	0
Tim Unroe	14	16	3	.188	0	0
Todd Dunn	6	10	3	.300	0	1
Brian Banks	4	7	4	.571	1	2
Danny Perez	4	4	0	.000	0	0

=== Pitching ===
==== Starting pitchers ====
Note: G = Games pitched; IP = Innings pitched; W = Wins; L = Losses; ERA = Earned run average; SO = Strikeouts

Player	G	IP	W	L	ERA	SO
Ben McDonald	35	221.1	12	10	3.90	146
Scott Karl	32	207.1	13	9	4.86	121
Ricky Bones	32	145.0	7	14	5.83	59
Jeff D'Amico	17	86.0	6	6	5.44	53
Cal Eldred	15	84.2	4	4	4.46	50
Tim Van Egmond	12	54.2	3	5	5.27	33
Brian Givens	4	14.0	1	3	12.86	10

==== Other pitchers ====
Note: G = Games pitched; IP = Innings pitched; W = Wins; L = Losses; ERA = Earned run average; SO = Strikeouts

Player	G	IP	W	L	ERA	SO
Ángel Miranda	46	109.1	7	6	4.94	78
Steve Sparks	20	88.2	4	7	6.60	21

==== Relief pitchers ====
Note: G = Games pitched; W = Wins; L = Losses; SV = Saves; ERA = Earned run average; SO = Strikeouts

Player	G	W	L	SV	ERA	SO
Mike Fetters	61	3	3	32	3.38	53
Graeme Lloyd	52	2	4	0	2.82	24
Ramón García	37	4	4	4	6.66	40
Marshall Boze	25	0	2	1	7.79	19
Mike Potts	24	1	2	1	7.15	21
Doug Jones	24	5	0	1	3.41	34
Ron Villone	23	0	0	2	3.28	19
Kevin Wickander	21	2	0	0	4.97	19
Bryce Florie	15	0	1	0	6.63	12
Bob Wickman	12	3	0	0	3.24	14
José Mercedes	11	0	2	0	9.18	6
Terry Burrows	8	2	0	0	2.84	5
Cris Carpenter	8	0	0	0	7.56	2
Mark Kiefer	7	0	0	0	8.10	5
Al Reyes	5	1	0	0	7.94	2

== Farm system ==
The Brewers' farm system consisted of seven minor league affiliates in 1996. The Brewers operated a Dominican Summer League team as a co-op with the Chicago White Sox. The Helena Brewers won the Pioneer League championship.

Level	Team	League	Manager
Triple-A	New Orleans Zephyrs	American Association	Tim Ireland
Double-A	El Paso Diablos	Texas League	Dave Machemer
Class A-Advanced	Stockton Ports	California League	Greg Mahlberg
Class A	Beloit Snappers	Midwest League	Luis Salazar
Rookie	Helena Brewers	Pioneer League	Alex Morales
Rookie	Ogden Raptors	Pioneer League	Bernie Moncallo
Rookie	DSL Brewers/White Sox	Dominican Summer League	—
