= 1996 Baltimore Orioles season =

Major League Baseball season

1996 Baltimore Orioles
- American League Wild Card winners
- League: American League
- Division: East
- Ballpark: Oriole Park at Camden Yards
- City: Baltimore, Maryland
- Record: 88–74 (.543)
- Divisional place: 2nd
- Owners: Peter Angelos
- General managers: Pat Gillick
- Managers: Davey Johnson
- Television: WJZ-TV; Home Team Sports (Mel Proctor, Josh Lewin, Mike Flanagan, Jim Palmer)
- Radio: WBAL (AM) (Chuck Thompson, Jon Miller, Fred Manfra)

The 1996 Baltimore Orioles season was the 96th season in Baltimore Orioles franchise history, the 43rd in Baltimore, and the 5th at Oriole Park at Camden Yards.

The Orioles finished second in the American League East with a record of 88 wins and 74 losses and qualifying for the post-season as the Wild Card team. The Orioles broke the all-time record for most home runs hit by a team (set at 240 by the 1961 New York Yankees) with 257. During the season, four Orioles scored at least 100 runs, four drove in at least 100 runs and nine hit at least 20 home runs (Eddie Murray hit 10 home runs with the Indians before being traded to the Orioles, where he would hit 12 more home runs for a total of 22 for the season. Todd Zeile hit 20 home runs with the Philadelphia Phillies of the National League before he was traded to the Orioles, which technically did not count for his home run total for the season after being traded to the American League Orioles). The Orioles pitching staff allowed 209 home runs, 1,604 hits and had an ERA of 5.15. The Orioles defeated the Cleveland Indians in the ALDS and then lost in the ALCS to the New York Yankees.

== Offseason ==
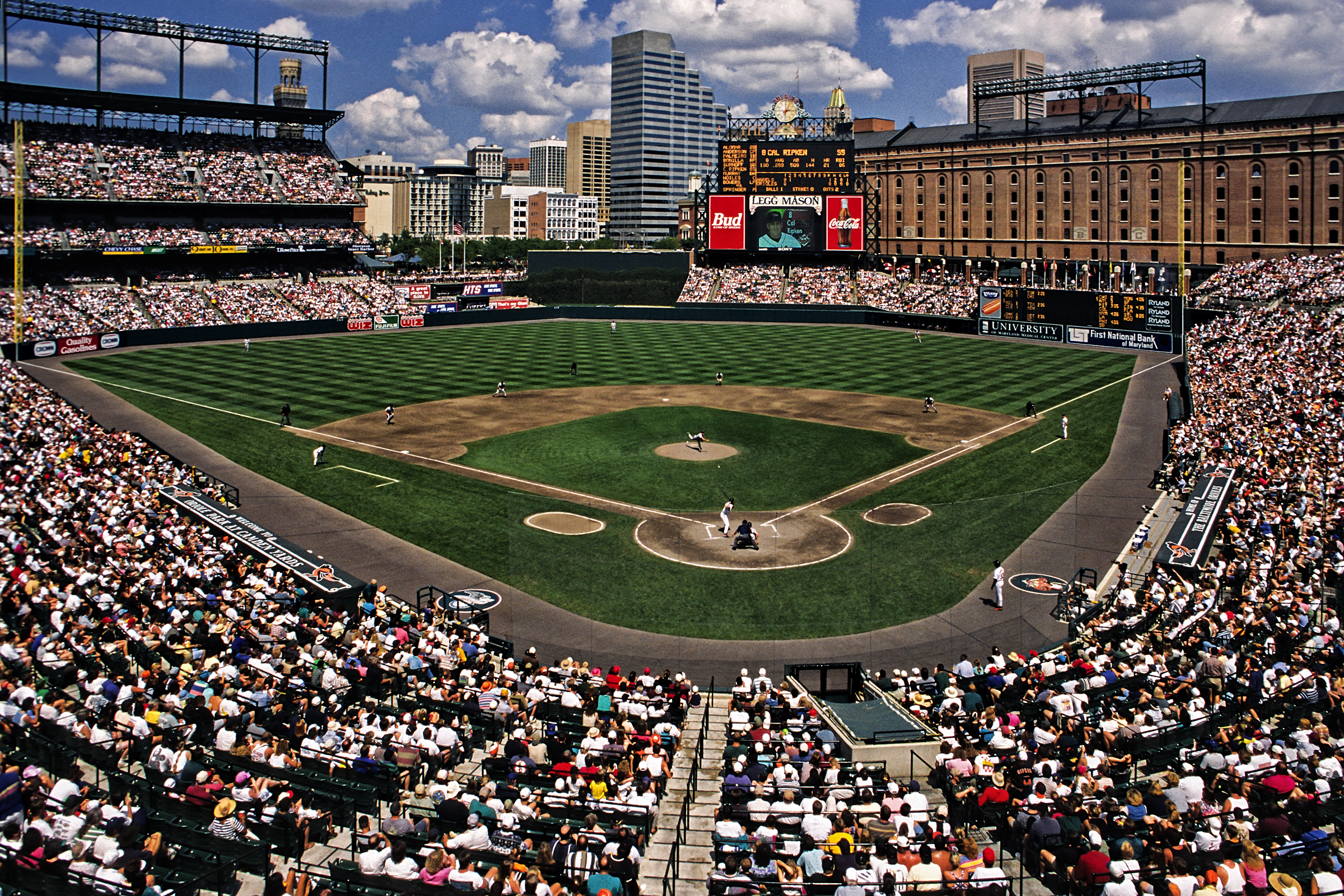
Oriole Park at Camden Yards, September 1996

- November 22, 1995: Clay Bellinger was signed as a free agent with the Baltimore Orioles.
- December 14, 1995: Randy Myers signed as a free agent with the Baltimore Orioles.
- December 20, 1995: B. J. Surhoff was signed as a free agent with the Baltimore Orioles.
- December 23, 1995: Billy Ripken was signed as a free agent with the Baltimore Orioles.
- March 13, 1996: Sherman Obando was traded by the Baltimore Orioles to the Montreal Expos for Tony Tarasco.

== Regular season ==
- On September 27 in Toronto, Roberto Alomar spat at home-plate umpire John Hirschbeck after getting thrown out of a game for arguing a called third strike.

=== Opening Day starters ===
- Roberto Alomar
- Brady Anderson
- Bobby Bonilla
- Jeffrey Hammonds
- Chris Hoiles
- Mike Mussina
- Rafael Palmeiro
- Cal Ripken Jr.
- B. J. Surhoff
- Tony Tarasco

=== Notable transactions ===
- December 21, 1995: Roberto Alomar was signed as a free agent.
- December 26, 1995: Traded Curtis Goodwin and Trovin Valdez to Cincinnati Reds for David Wells.
- April 19, 1996: Luis Polonia was signed as a free agent with the Baltimore Orioles.
- June 6, 1996: Todd Frohwirth was signed as a free agent with the Baltimore Orioles.
- August 12, 1996: Luis Polonia was released by the Baltimore Orioles.
- August 23, 1996: Gregg Zaun was sent by the Baltimore Orioles to the Florida Marlins to complete an earlier deal made on August 21, 1996. The Baltimore Orioles sent a player to be named later to the Florida Marlins for Terry Mathews. The Baltimore Orioles sent Gregg Zaun (August 23, 1996) to the Florida Marlins to complete the trade.
- August 29, 1996: Traded Calvin Maduro and Garrett Stephenson to Philadelphia Phillies for Todd Zeile and Pete Incaviglia.

=== Season standings ===
AL East
Team	W	L	Pct.	GB	Home	Road
New York Yankees	92	70	.568	—	49‍–‍31	43‍–‍39
Baltimore Orioles	88	74	.543	4	43‍–‍38	45‍–‍36
Boston Red Sox	85	77	.525	7	47‍–‍34	38‍–‍43
Toronto Blue Jays	74	88	.457	18	35‍–‍46	39‍–‍42
Detroit Tigers	53	109	.327	39	27‍–‍54	26‍–‍55

=== Record vs. opponents ===
1996 American League record Source: MLB Standings Grid – 1996
Team	BAL	BOS	CAL	CWS	CLE	DET	KC	MIL	MIN	NYY	OAK	SEA	TEX	TOR
Baltimore	—	7–6	6–6	4–8	5–7	11–2	9–3	9–3	7–5	3–10	9–4	7–5	3–10–1	8–5
Boston	6–7	—	8–4	6–6	1–11	12–1	3–9	7–5	6–6	7–6	8–5	7–6	6–6	8–5
California	6–6	4–8	—	6–6	4–9	6–6	4–8	7–5	4–8	7–6	6–7	5–8	4–9	7–5
Chicago	8–4	6–6	6–6	—	5–8	10–3	7–6	6–7	6–7	6–7	5–7	5–7	8–4	7–5
Cleveland	7–5	11–1	9–4	8–5	—	12–0	7–6	7–6	10–3	3–9	6–6	8–4	4–8	7–5
Detroit	2–11	1–12	6–6	3–10	0–12	—	6–6	4–8	6–6	5–8	4–8	6–6	4–9	6–7
Kansas City	3–9	9–3	8–4	6–7	6–7	6–6	—	4–9	6–7	4–8	5–7	7–5	6–6	5–8
Milwaukee	3–9	5–7	5–7	7–6	6–7	8–4	9–4	—	9–4	6–6	7–5	4–9	6–7	5–7
Minnesota	5–7	6–6	8–4	7–6	3–10	6–6	7–6	4–9	—	5–7	6–7	6–6	7–5	8–5
New York	10–3	6–7	6–7	7–6	9–3	8–5	8–4	6–6	7–5	—	9–3	3–9	5–7	8–5
Oakland	4–9	5–8	7–6	7–5	6–6	8–4	7–5	5–7	7–6	3–9	—	8–5	7–6	4–8
Seattle	5–7	6–7	8–5	7–5	4–8	6–6	5–7	9–4	6–6	9–3	5–8	—	10–3	5–7
Texas	10–3–1	6–6	9–4	4–8	8–4	9–4	6–6	7–6	5–7	7–5	6–7	3–10	—	10–2
Toronto	5–8	5–8	5–7	5–7	5–7	7–6	8–5	7–5	5–8	5–8	8–4	7–5	2–10	—

=== Game log ===
1996 Game Log: 88–74 (Home: 43–38; Away: 45–36)
April: 14–12 (Home: 10–6; Away: 4–6)

#	Date	Opponent	Score	Win	Loss	Save	Attendance	Record
1	April 2	Royals	4–2	**Mussina** (1–0)	Appier	**Myers** (1)	46,818	1–0
2	April 3	Royals	7–1	**Wells** (1–0)	Gubicza	—	40,068	2–0
3	April 4	Royals	5–3	**Rhodes** (1–0)	Pichardo	**Myers** (2)	38,753	3–0
4	April 5	@ Twins	2–1	**Mercker** (1–0)	Guardado	**Myers** (3)	22,744	4–0
5	April 6	@ Twins	3–8	Radke	**Haynes** (0–1)	—	22,334	4–1
6	April 7	@ Twins	4–2	**Mussina** (2–0)	Robertson	**Myers** (4)	14,580	5–1
7	April 10	Indians	3–2 (10)	**Orosco** (1–0)	Tavarez	—	45,097	6–1
8	April 11	Indians	14–4	**Erickson** (1–0)	Hershiser	**Rhodes** (1)	43,189	7–1
9	April 12	Twins	3–2	**Mussina** (3–0)	Robertson	—	42,602	8–1
10	April 13	Twins	7–6	**Benitez** (1–0)	Mahomes	—	42,644	9–1
11	April 14	Twins	1–4	Rodriguez	**Haynes** (0–2)	Stevens	42,660	9–2
12	April 16	Red Sox	6–1	**Wells** (2–0)	Clemens	—	40,017	10–2
13	April 17	Red Sox	6–5 (12)	**Rhodes** (2–0)	Maddux	—	40,258	11–2
14	April 18	Red Sox	7–10	Moyer	**Mussina** (3–1)	Slocumb	47,283	11–3
15	April 19	@ Rangers	7–26	Cook	**Mercker** (1–1)	Vosberg	41,184	11–4
16	April 20	@ Rangers	3–8	Gross	**Haynes** (0–3)	—	45,358	11–5
17	April 21	@ Rangers	6–9	Oliver	**Wells** (2–1)	—	39,456	11–6
18	April 22	@ Indians	3–6	Nagy	**Erickson** (1–1)	Mesa	42,236	11–7
19	April 23	@ Indians	8–9	Ogea	**Mussina** (3–2)	Mesa	40,770	11–8
20	April 24	@ Royals	11–8	**Mercker** (2–1)	Haney	—	13,962	12–8
21	April 25	@ Royals	3–2	**Rhodes** (3–0)	Valera	**Myers** (5)	16,090	13–8
22	April 26	Rangers	4–5	Brandenburg	**Wells** (2–2)	Henneman	44,022	13–9
23	April 27	Rangers	2–4	Witt	**Erickson** (1–2)	Vosberg	47,311	13–10
24	April 28	Rangers	4–5 (10)	Heredia	**McDowell** (0–1)	Henneman	47,327	13–11
25	April 29	Rangers	8–7	**Haynes** (1–3)	Helling	**Myers** (6)	41,503	14–11
26	April 30	Yankees	10–13	Nelson	**Shepherd** (0–1)	Wetteland	43,117	14–12

May: 14–10 (Home: 8–5; Away: 6–5)

#	Date	Opponent	Score	Win	Loss	Save	Attendance	Record
27	May 1	Yankees	6–11 (15)	Pettitte	**Mercker** (2–2)	—	47,472	14–13
28	May 3	Brewers	8–2	**Erickson** (2–2)	Bones	—	41,037	15–13
29	May 4	Brewers	10–5	**Mussina** (4–2)	Sparks	—	44,175	16–13
30	May 5	Brewers	1–13	McDonald	**Haynes** (1–4)	—	46,027	16–14
31	May 7	@ White Sox	2–3	Fernandez	**Wells** (2–3)	Hernandez	16,130	16–15
32	May 8	@ White Sox	2–11	Baldwin	**Erickson** (2–3)	—	14,974	16–16
33	May 9	@ White Sox	6–4	**Mussina** (5–2)	Alvarez	**Myers** (7)	14,507	17–16
34	May 10	@ Brewers	10–7 (12)	**Orosco** (2–0)	Garcia	**McDowell** (1)	9,520	18–16
35	May 11	@ Brewers	5–3 (10)	**Rhodes** (4–0)	Potts	**Myers** (8)	21,081	19–16
36	May 12	@ Brewers	4–6	Miranda	**Erickson** (2–4)	Fetters	14,333	19–17
37	May 13	@ Athletics	4–3	**Krivda** (1–0)	Johns	**Myers** (9)	8,204	20–17
38	May 14	@ Athletics	9–1	**Mussina** (6–2)	Reyes	—	8,466	21–17
39	May 17	Mariners	14–13	**Mills** (1–0)	Charlton	—	47,259	22–17
40	May 18	Mariners	3–7	Milacki	**Mercker** (2–3)	—	46,434	22–18
41	May 19	Mariners	8–7	**Mussina** (7–2)	Hurtado	**Myers** (10)	47,565	23–18
42	May 20	Angels	13–1	**Wells** (3–3)	Grimsley	—	43,492	24–18
43	May 21	Angels	2–5	Boskie	**Krivda** (1–1)	Percival	39,974	24–19
44	May 22	Angels	10–5	**Haynes** (2–4)	Abbott	**McDowell** (2)	45,817	25–19
45	May 24	Athletics	5–4 (10)	**McDowell** (1–1)	Reyes	—	45,024	26–19
46	May 25	Athletics	3–6	Johns	**Wells** (3–4)	Groom	47,353	26–20
47	May 26	Athletics	6–1	**Mercker** (3–3)	Chouinard	**McDowell** (3)	47,401	27–20
48	May 28	@ Mariners	12–8	**Rhodes** (5–0)	Guetterman	**Haynes** (1)	23,235	28–20
49	May 29	@ Mariners	8–9	Charlton	**Myers** (0–1)	—	20,253	28–21
50	May 31	@ Angels	3–10	Langston	**Wells** (3–5)	—	21,603	28–22

June: 14–14 (Home: 6–6; Away: 8–8)

#	Date	Opponent	Score	Win	Loss	Save	Attendance	Record
51	June 1	@ Angels	3–8	Boskie	**Haynes** (2–5)	—	35,350	28–23
52	June 2	@ Angels	14–1	**Erickson** (3–4)	Abbott	—	33,704	29–23
53	June 4	Tigers	10–7	**Mussina** (8–2)	Gohr	**Myers** (11)	43,727	30–23
54	June 5	Tigers	6–4	**Rhodes** (6–0)	Myers	**Myers** (12)	43,087	31–23
55	June 6	Tigers	13–6	**Krivda** (2–1)	Lira	—	46,269	32–23
56	June 7	White Sox	2–8	Fernandez	**Erickson** (3–5)	—	47,209	32–24
57	June 8	White Sox	1–2	Baldwin	**Mercker** (3–4)	Hernandez	47,634	32–25
58	June 9	White Sox	9–12	Karchner	**Mussina** (8–3)	Hernandez	47,352	32–26
59	June 10	@ Tigers	3–8	Olivares	**Wells** (3–6)	—	10,655	32–27
60	June 11	@ Tigers	12–9	**Coppinger** (1–0)	Lira	—	10,874	33–27
61	June 12	@ Tigers	10–7	**Rhodes** (7–0)	Lewis	**Myers** (13)	12,043	34–27
62	June 13	@ Royals	2–10	Linton	**Mercker** (3–5)	—	20,108	34–28
63	June 14	@ Royals	6–1	**Mussina** (9–3)	Gubicza	—	28,502	35–28
64	June 15	@ Royals	6–7 (16)	Magnante	**Krivda** (2–2)	—	24,784	35–29
65	June 16	@ Royals	13–5	**Coppinger** (2–0)	Jacome	**Mills** (1)	19,437	36–29
66	June 17	Rangers	1–1 (6)			—	45,581	36–29
67	June 18	Rangers	0–7	Oliver	**Mercker** (3–6)	—	47,318	36–30
68	June 19	Rangers	2–3	Witt	**Mussina** (9–4)	Russell	45,581	36–31
69	June 20	Rangers	3–2	**Wells** (4–6)	Gross	**Myers** (14)	21,748	37–31
70	June 21	Royals	9–3	**Rhodes** (8–0)	Haney	—	47,644	38–31
71	June 22	Royals	5–3	**Erickson** (4–5)	Montgomery	—	47,534	39–31
72	June 23	Royals	0–4	Appier	**Krivda** (2–3)	—	47,608	39–32
73	June 24	@ Rangers	8–3	**Mussina** (10–4)	Witt	—	39,701	40–32
74	June 25	@ Rangers	2–5	Gross	**Wells** (4–7)	Henneman	41,685	40–33
75	June 26	@ Rangers	5–6	Cook	**Orosco** (2–1)	Henneman	38,984	40–34
76	June 27	@ Yankees	2–3	Rogers	**Erickson** (4–6)	Wetteland	34,161	40–35
77	June 28	@ Yankees	7–4	**Rhodes** (9–0)	Rivera	**Myers** (15)	43,515	41–35
78	June 29	@ Yankees	3–4	Pettitte	**Mussina** (10–5)	Wetteland	45,295	41–36
79	June 30	@ Yankees	9–1	**Wells** (5–7)	Mendoza	—	40,200	42–36

July: 11–16 (Home: 5–13; Away: 6–3)

#	Date	Opponent	Score	Win	Loss	Save	Attendance	Record
80	July 1	@ Blue Jays	7–4	**Coppinger** (3–0)	Hentgen	**Myers** (16)	43,377	43–36
81	July 2	@ Blue Jays	8–2	**Erickson** (5–6)	Quantrill	—	32,150	44–36
82	July 3	@ Blue Jays	2–5	Guzman	**Krivda** (2–4)	Timlin	32,365	44–37
83	July 4	Red Sox	8–6	**Mussina** (11–5)	Wakefield	**Myers** (17)	47,075	45–37
84	July 5	Red Sox	3–7	Sele	**Wells** (5–8)	—	47,237	45–38
85	July 6	Red Sox	4–3	**Coppinger** (4–0)	Clemens	**Myers** (18)	47,500	46–38
86	July 7	Red Sox	5–7	Hudson	**Myers** (0–2)	Slocumb	47,532	46–39
87	July 11	Yankees	2–4	Key	**Mussina** (11–6)	Wetteland	46,760	46–40
88	July 13	Yankees	2–3	Nelson	**Wells** (5–9)	Wetteland	—	46–41
89	July 13	Yankees	5–7	Gooden	**Rhodes** (9–1)	Wetteland	46,451	46–42
90	July 14	Yankees	1–4	Pettitte	**Erickson** (5–7)	Wetteland	47,658	46–43
91	July 15	Blue Jays	8–6	**Haynes** (3–5)	Timlin	—	43,192	47–43
92	July 16	Blue Jays	0–6	Guzman	**Mussina** (11–7)	—	45,851	47–44
93	July 17	Blue Jays	11–10	**Coppinger** (5–0)	Timlin	—	45,955	48–44
94	July 18	@ Red Sox	6–3	**Wells** (6–9)	Sele	**Myers** (19)	33,014	49–44
95	July 19	@ Red Sox	2–13	Moyer	**Erickson** (5–8)	—	32,262	49–45
96	July 20	@ Red Sox	0–2	Wakefield	**Coppinger** (5–1)	Slocumb	33,590	49–46
97	July 21	@ Red Sox	10–6 (10)	**Myers** (1–2)	Stanton	—	34,423	50–46
98	July 22	Twins	5–9	Robertson	**Haynes** (3–6)	Trombley	42,129	50–47
99	July 23	Twins	2–3	Aguilera	**Wells** (6–10)	Naulty	42,006	50–48
100	July 24	Twins	4–11	Rodriguez	**Erickson** (5–9)	—	46,181	50–49
101	July 25	Indians	7–10	Nagy	**Coppinger** (5–2)	—	47,025	50–50
102	July 26	Indians	9–14	Assenmacher	**Mussina** (11–8)	—	46,751	50–51
103	July 27	Indians	14–2	**Wells** (7–10)	Hershiser	—	47,360	51–51
104	July 28	Indians	3–6 (13)	Mesa	**Stephenson** (0–1)	—	46,273	51–52
105	July 30	@ Twins	16–4	**Coppinger** (6–2)	Rodriguez	—	16,708	52–52
106	July 31	@ Twins	9–3	**Mussina** (12–8)	Trombley	—	15,897	53–52

August: 19–11 (Home: 7–4; Away: 12–7)

#	Date	Opponent	Score	Win	Loss	Save	Attendance	Record
107	August 1	@ Twins	4–2	**Wells** (8–10)	Robertson	**Myers** (20)	20,379	54–52
108	August 2	@ Indians	1–11	Hershiser	**Erickson** (5–10)	—	42,465	54–53
109	August 3	@ Indians	9–4	**Orosco** (3–1)	Ogea	—	42,448	55–53
110	August 4	@ Indians	2–14	Anderson	**Coppinger** (6–3)	—	42,349	55–54
111	August 5	@ Indians	13–10	**Wells** (9–10)	Assenmacher	—	40,863	56–54
112	August 6	@ Brewers	13–3	**Mussina** (13–8)	McDonald	—	17,075	57–54
113	August 7	@ Brewers	12–2	**Erickson** (6–10)	Karl	—	20,287	58–54
114	August 8	@ Brewers	6–4	**Coppinger** (7–3)	D'Amico	**Myers** (21)	18,620	59–54
115	August 9	@ White Sox	3–4 (10)	Simas	**Myers** (1–3)	—	23,995	59–55
116	August 10	@ White Sox	13–4	**Mussina** (14–8)	Alvarez	**McDowell** (4)	26,772	60–55
117	August 11	@ White Sox	5–8	Tapani	**Mills** (1–1)	Hernandez	27,088	60–56
118	August 13	Brewers	4–3	**Corbin** (1–0)	Lloyd	**Myers** (22)	44,461	61–56
119	August 14	Brewers	8–5	**Milchin** (1–0)	Bones	**Myers** (23)	47,480	62–56
120	August 15	@ Athletics	18–5	**Mussina** (15–8)	Adams	—	14,026	63–56
121	August 16	@ Athletics	14–3	**Erickson** (7–10)	Wasdin	—	—	64–56
122	August 16	@ Athletics	5–4 (10)	**Myers** (2–3)	Mohler	—	15,645	65–56
123	August 17	@ Athletics	1–3	Prieto	**Coppinger** (7–4)	Acre	20,231	65–57
124	August 18	@ Athletics	6–9	Wengert	**Wells** (9–11)	—	18,122	65–58
125	August 20	Mariners	4–1	**Mussina** (16–8)	Wagner	**Myers** (24)	47,679	66–58
126	August 21	Mariners	10–5	**Erickson** (8–10)	Hitchcock	—	47,198	67–58
127	August 22	Mariners	3–10	Moyer	**Coppinger** (7–5)	—	47,380	67–59
128	August 23	Angels	0–2	Boskie	**Wells** (9–12)	Percival	47,291	67–60
129	August 24	Angels	5–4	**Mussina** (17–8)	Abbott	**Myers** (25)	46,487	68–60
130	August 25	Angels	0–13	Springer	**Erickson** (8–11)	—	47,239	68–61
131	August 26	Athletics	12–11 (10)	**Myers** (3–3)	Acre	—	43,361	69–61
132	August 27	Athletics	3–1	**Wells** (10–12)	Prieto	**Myers** (26)	43,641	70–61
133	August 28	Athletics	0–3	Wengert	**Mussina** (17–9)	—	45,282	70–62
134	August 29	@ Mariners	6–9	Charlton	**Myers** (3–4)	—	24,915	70–63
135	August 30	@ Mariners	5–2	**Coppinger** (8–5)	Hitchcock	**Mills** (2)	44,532	71–63
136	August 31	@ Mariners	7–6	**Erickson** (9–11)	Bosio	**Benitez** (1)	42,092	72–63

September: 16–11 (Home: 7–4; Away: 9–7)

#	Date	Opponent	Score	Win	Loss	Save	Attendance	Record
137	September 1	@ Mariners	1–5	Mulholland	**Wells** (10–13)	—	50,015	72–64
138	September 2	@ Angels	12–8	**Mussina** (18–9)	Boskie	—	20,287	73–64
139	September 3	@ Angels	2–10	Harris	**Coppinger** (8–6)	—	15,924	73–65
140	September 4	@ Angels	4–2	**Erickson** (10–11)	Springer	**Myers** (27)	18,204	74–65
141	September 6	Tigers	4–5 (12)	Cummings	**Mathews** (0–1)	—	46,708	74–66
142	September 7	Tigers	6–0	**Mussina** (19–9)	Thompson	—	47,131	75–66
143	September 8	Tigers	6–2	**Mills** (2–1)	Eischen	—	47,082	76–66
144	September 9	Tigers	5–4	**Erickson** (11–11)	Olivares	**Myers** (28)	42,562	77–66
145	September 10	White Sox	5–1	**Wells** (11–13)	Tapani	—	43,320	78–66
146	September 11	White Sox	7–6 (10)	**Mills** (3–1)	Hernandez	—	43,320	79–66
147	September 12	White Sox	3–11	Fernandez	**Mussina** (19–10)	—	47,342	79–67
148	September 13	@ Tigers	7–4	**Erickson** (12–11)	Miller	**Mills** (3)	11,178	80–67
149	September 14	@ Tigers	7–6	**Mathews** (1–1)	Cummings	**Myers** (29)	15,386	81–67
150	September 15	@ Tigers	16–6	**Corbin** (2–0)	Van Poppel	—	13,764	82–67
151	September 18	@ Yankees	2–3 (10)	Rivera	**Mills** (3–2)	—	40,775	82–68
152	September 19	@ Yankees	3–9	Rogers	**Mussina** (19–11)	—	—	82–69
153	September 19	@ Yankees	10–9	**Mathews** (2–1)	Rivera	**Myers** (30)	54,888	83–69
154	September 20	Blue Jays	1–5	Hentgen	**Krivda** (2–5)	Spoljaric	47,026	83–70
155	September 21	Blue Jays	6–3	**Coppinger** (9–6)	Williams	**Myers** (31)	47,270	84–70
156	September 22	Blue Jays	5–4	**Erickson** (13–11)	Flener	**Benitez** (2)	46,035	85–70
157	September 23	Brewers	7–8 (10)	Jones	**Mathews** (2–2)	Fetters	46,542	85–71
158	September 24	@ Red Sox	8–13	Gordon	**Wells** (11–14)	Mahomes	28,557	85–72
159	September 25	@ Red Sox	6–2	**Krivda** (3–5)	Wakefield	**Benitez** (3)	28,432	86–72
160	September 26	@ Blue Jays	4–1	**Coppinger** (10–6)	Williams	**Benitez** (4)	30,141	87–72
161	September 27	@ Blue Jays	2–3	Flener	**Erickson** (13–12)	Timlin	30,116	87–73
162	September 28	@ Blue Jays	3–2 (10)	**Myers** (4–4)	Spoljaric	—	36,316	88–73
163	September 29	@ Blue Jays	1–4	Hentgen	**Rodriguez** (0–1)	Timlin	38,267	88–74

Legend: = Win = Loss = Tie
Bold = Orioles team member

=== Detailed records ===
American League
Opponent	W	L	WP	RS	RA
AL East
**Baltimore Orioles**					
Boston Red Sox	7	6	0.538	71	78
Detroit Tigers	11	2	0.846	105	68
New York Yankees	3	10	0.231	62	75
Toronto Blue Jays	8	5	0.615	58	55
Total	29	23	0.558	296	276
AL Central
Chicago White Sox	4	8	0.333	58	74
Cleveland Indians	5	7	0.417	86	92
Kansas City Royals	9	3	0.750	71	49
Milwaukee Brewers	9	3	0.750	88	61
Minnesota Twins	7	5	0.583	60	55
Total	34	26	0.567	363	331
AL West
California Angels	6	6	0.500	68	69
Oakland Athletics	9	4	0.692	86	54
Seattle Mariners	7	5	0.583	81	82
Texas Rangers	3	10	0.231	55	91
Total	25	25	0.500	290	296
Season Total	88	74	0.543	949	903

Month	Games	Won	Lost	Win %	RS	RA
April	26	14	12	0.538	141	153
May	24	14	10	0.583	154	145
June	28	14	14	0.500	166	144
July	27	11	16	0.407	153	160
August	30	19	11	0.633	192	165
September	27	16	11	0.593	143	136
Total	162	88	74	0.543	949	903

	Games	Won	Lost	Win %	RS	RA
Home	81	43	38	0.531	437	440
Away	81	45	36	0.556	511	462
Total	162	88	74	0.543	949	903

=== Roster ===
1996 Baltimore Orioles
**Roster**
**Pitchers**: 49 Armando Benítez; 27 Rocky Coppinger; 41 Archie Corbin; 19 Scott Erickson; 50 Jimmy Haynes; 38 Rick Krivda; 51 Terry Mathews; 31 Roger McDowell; 21 Kent Mercker; 21 Mike Milchin; 75 Alan Mills; 35 Mike Mussina; 46 Jimmy Myers; 28 Randy Myers; 47 Jesse Orosco; 53 Arthur Rhodes; 63 Nerio Rodríguez; 57 Brian Sackinsky; 45 Keith Shepherd; 52 Garrett Stephenson; 36 David Wells; 43 Esteban Yan	**Catchers**: 59 César Devarez; 23 Chris Hoiles; 24 Mark Parent; 24 Gregg Zaun; **Infielders**: 6 Manny Alexander; 12 Roberto Alomar; 30 Jeff Huson; 25 Rafael Palmeiro; 3 Billy Ripken; 8 Cal Ripken Jr.; 17 B. J. Surhoff; 14 Todd Zeile	**Outfielders**: 9 Brady Anderson; 26 Bobby Bonilla; 30 Brent Bowers; 10 Mike Devereaux; 11 Jeffrey Hammonds; 55 Pete Incaviglia; 40 Gene Kingsale; 29 Luis Polonia; 34 Mark Smith; 1 Tony Tarasco; **Other batters**: 33 Eddie Murray	**Manager**: 15 Davey Johnson; **Coaches**: 37 Pat Dobson; 48 Rick Down; 55 Andy Etchebarren; 44 Elrod Hendricks; 2 Sam Perlozzo; 18 John Stearns

== Player stats ==
= Indicates team leader

=== Batting ===
Note: G = Pos = Position; Games played; AB = At bats; H = Hits; HR = Home runs; RBI = Runs batted in; Avg. = Batting average

Pos	Player	G	AB	H	HR	RBI	Avg.
C	Chris Hoiles	127	407	105	25	73	.258
1B	Rafael Palmeiro	162	626	181	39	142	.289
2B	Roberto Alomar	153	588	193	22	94	.328
3B	B. J. Surhoff	143	537	157	21	82	.292
SS	Cal Ripken Jr.	163	640	178	26	102	.278
LF	Jeffrey Hammonds	71	248	56	9	27	.226
CF	Brady Anderson	149	579	172	50	110	.297
RF	Bobby Bonilla	159	595	171	28	116	.287
DH	Eddie Murray	64	230	59	10	34	.257

==== Other batters ====
Note: G = Games played; AB = At bats; H = Hits; HR = Home runs; RBI = Runs batted in; Avg. = Batting average

Player	G	AB	H	HR	RBI	Avg.
Mike Devereaux	127	323	74	8	34	.229
Luis Polonia	58	175	42	2	14	.240
Billy Ripken	57	135	31	2	12	.230
Todd Zeile	29	117	28	5	19	.239
Gregg Zaun	50	108	25	1	13	.231
Tony Tarasco	31	84	20	1	9	.238
Mark Smith	27	78	19	4	10	.244
Manny Alexander	54	68	7	0	4	.103
Brent Bowers	21	39	12	0	3	.308
Pete Incaviglia	12	33	10	2	8	.303
Mark Parent	18	33	6	2	6	.182
Jeff Huson	17	28	9	0	2	.321
César Devarez	10	18	2	0	0	.111
Gene Kingsale	3	0	0	0	0	.---

=== Pitching ===
Position	Name	Games Pitched	Games Started	ERA	Wins	Losses	Saves	Innings Pitched	Strikeouts
Starting Pitchers									
	Mike Mussina	36	36	4.81	19	11	0	243.1	204
	Scott Erickson	34	34	5.02	13	12	0	222.1	100
	David Wells	34	34	5.14	11	14	0	224.1	130
	Rocky Coppinger	23	22	5.18	10	6	0	135.0	104
	Kent Mercker	14	12	7.76	3	6	0	58.0	22
Relief Pitchers									
	Jesse Orosco	66	0	3.40	3	1	0	55.2	52
	Roger McDowell	41	0	4.25	1	1	4	59.1	20
	Arthur Rhodes	28	0	4.08	9	1	1	53.0	62
	Alan Mills	49	0	4.28	3	2	3	54.2	52
	Archie Corbin	18	0	2.30	2	0	0	27.1	20
	Keith Shepherd	13	0	8.71	0	1	0	20.2	17
	Terry Mathews	14	0	3.38	2	2	0	18.2	13
	Armando Benítez	18	0	3.77	1	0	4	14.1	20
	Jimmy Myers	11	0	7.07	0	0	0	14.0	6
	Esteban Yan	4	0	5.79	0	0	0	9.1	7
	Mike Milchin	13	0	5.73	1	0	0	11.0	10
	Garrett Stephenson	3	0	12.79	0	1	0	6.1	3
	Brian Sackinsky	3	0	3.86	0	0	0	4.2	2
	Jimmy Haynes	26	11	8.29	3	6	0	89.0	65
	Rick Krivda	22	11	4.96	3	5	0	81.2	54
	Nerio Rodríguez	8	1	4.32	0	1	0	16.2	12
	Manny Alexander	1	0	67.50	0	0	0	0.2	0
Closer									
	Randy Myers	62	0	3.53	4	4	31	58.2	74

== Return of Eddie Murray ==
On July 21, 1996, the Baltimore Orioles re-acquired longtime Oriole Eddie Murray from the Cleveland Indians in exchange for pitcher Kent Mercker. Murray, a member of the 1983 World Series Champion Baltimore Orioles, would subsequently hit his 500th career home run later in the season. As a commemoration of this event, an orange seat was installed in the outfield stands where Murray's 500th home run landed. The Orioles had a record of 49 wins and 46 losses before the trade, and 39–28 after the trade, not including the playoffs. During the 1996 playoffs, Eddie Murray hit .333 and hit a home run while producing 3 RBI.

The trade for Eddie Murray sparked the Orioles to have a better record after his arrival, than before. One can attribute that to his great leadership, which is well documented, as a Sporting News correspondent, Michael P. Geffner said, "To think of Murray as anything other than a great player these days is not to have a dissenting opinion anymore but to be dead wrong, blind not only to the inner game but to an understanding of what truly raises baseball to something classic and beautiful--when the game is executed purely and seamlessly. Which is Eddie Murray to a T.". The Orioles success after the trade can also be attributed to the theory of "Power, worth, and recognition, " which Thomas S. Parish who is an associate professor of psychology at Upper Iowa University, Fayette, Iowa, describes as a type of motivation where athletes attempt to out do or "show off" to each other, which leads to better statistics, and more wins. In Eddie Murray's last at-bat with the Orioles he hit a home run off of New York Yankee pitcher, Andy Pettitte.

== ALDS ==
=== Game 1, October 1 ===
Oriole Park at Camden Yards, Baltimore, Maryland

Team	1	2	3	4	5	6	7	8	9	R	H	E
Cleveland	0	1	0	2	0	0	1	0	0	4	10	0
Baltimore	1	1	2	0	0	5	1	0	X	10	10	1
WP: David Wells (1-0) LP: Charles Nagy (0-1); Home runs: Cle: Manny Ramírez (1); Bal: Brady Anderson (1), B. J. Surhoff (1, 2), Bobby Bonilla (1)

=== Game 2, October 2 ===
Oriole Park at Camden Yards, Baltimore, Maryland

Team	1	2	3	4	5	6	7	8	9	R	H	E
Cleveland	0	0	0	0	0	3	0	1	0	4	8	2
Baltimore	1	0	0	0	3	0	0	3	X	7	9	0
WP: Armando Benítez (1-0) LP: Eric Plunk (0-1) Sv: Randy Myers (1); Home runs: Cle: Albert Belle (1); Bal: Brady Anderson (2)

=== Game 3, October 4 ===
Jacobs Field, Cleveland, Ohio

Team	1	2	3	4	5	6	7	8	9	R	H	E
Baltimore	0	1	0	3	0	0	0	0	0	4	8	2
Cleveland	1	2	0	1	0	0	4	1	X	9	10	0
WP: Paul Assenmacher (1-0) LP: Jesse Orosco (0-1); Home runs: Bal: B. J. Surhoff (3); Cle: Manny Ramírez (2), Albert Belle (2)

=== Game 4, October 5 ===
Jacobs Field, Cleveland, Ohio

Team	1	2	3	4	5	6	7	8	9	10	11	12	R	H	E
Baltimore	0	2	0	0	0	0	0	0	1	0	0	1	4	14	1
Cleveland	0	0	0	2	1	0	0	0	0	0	0	0	3	7	1
WP: Armando Benítez (2-0) LP: José Mesa (0-1) Sv: Randy Myers (2); Home runs: Bal: Rafael Palmeiro (1), Bobby Bonilla (2), Roberto Alomar (1); Cle: None

== ALCS ==
Game	Score	Date
1	Baltimore 4, New York 5	October 9
2	Baltimore 5, New York 3	October 10
3	New York 5, Baltimore 2	October 11
4	New York 8, Baltimore 4	October 12
5	New York 6, Baltimore 4	October 13

== Jeffrey Maier incident ==
During Game 1 of the ALCS, New York Yankees shortstop Derek Jeter hit a deep fly ball to right field. Orioles outfielder Tony Tarasco camped under the ball and prepared to make a catch. However, a 12-year-old boy seated in the first row of the bleachers named Jeffrey Maier reached over the wall and caught the ball just above Tarrasco, costing the Orioles an out. Although it was fan interference, the umpire ruled the ball to be a home run. While Maier became a hero to Yankees fans, he immediately became a "symbol of the Orioles futility." The Orioles would go on to lose the series in five games.

== Farm system ==
Level	Team	League	Manager
AAA	Rochester Red Wings	International League	Marv Foley
AA	Bowie Baysox	Eastern League	Bob Miscik and Tim Blackwell
A	High Desert Mavericks	California League	Joe Ferguson
A	Frederick Keys	Carolina League	Tim Blackwell and Julio Garcia
Rookie	Bluefield Orioles	Appalachian League	Bobby Dickerson
Rookie	GCL Orioles	Gulf Coast League	Tommy Shields

LEAGUE CHAMPIONS: Bluefield
