= 1996 Texas Rangers season =

1996 Texas Rangers
- American League West champions
- League: American League
- Division: West
- Ballpark: The Ballpark in Arlington
- City: Arlington, Texas
- Record: 90–72 (.556)
- Divisional place: 1st
- Owners: George W. Bush
- General managers: Doug Melvin
- Managers: Johnny Oates
- Television: KXTX-TV 39; KXAS-TV 5 (Mark Holtz, Tom Grieve)
- Radio: KRLD–AM 1080 (Eric Nadel, Brad Sham); KXEB–AM 910 (Luis Mayoral, Josue Perez)

The 1996 Texas Rangers season was the 36th of the Texas Rangers franchise overall, their 25th in Arlington as the Rangers, and their 3rd season at The Ballpark in Arlington. The Rangers finished first in the American League West with a record of 90 wins and 72 losses. It would be the first postseason appearance for the Senators/Rangers in franchise history, taking 36 seasons to finally accomplish the feat. This remains the longest amount of time it has ever taken any North American professional sports franchise to make their first playoff appearance. The Rangers would win their first post-season game at Yankee Stadium against the New York Yankees, but would lose the last three games to lose the ALDS. The one postseason win would be the club's only post-season success until 2010.

== Offseason ==
- October 8, 1995: Scott Podsednik was sent by the Rangers to the Florida Marlins to complete an earlier deal (the Rangers sent players to be named later to the Marlins for Bobby Witt, and sent Wilson Heredia to the Marlins on August 11) and made on August 8, 1995.
- December 21, 1995: Ken Hill was signed as a free agent by the Rangers.
- December 22, 1995: Mike Henneman was signed as a free agent by the Rangers.
- January 16, 1996: Kevin Elster was signed as a free agent with the Texas Rangers.

== Regular season ==
=== Season standings ===
AL West
Team	W	L	Pct.	GB	Home	Road
Texas Rangers	90	72	.556	—	50‍–‍31	40‍–‍41
Seattle Mariners	85	76	.528	4½	43‍–‍38	42‍–‍38
Oakland Athletics	78	84	.481	12	40‍–‍41	38‍–‍43
California Angels	70	91	.435	19½	43‍–‍38	27‍–‍53

=== Record vs. opponents ===
1996 American League record Source: MLB Standings Grid – 1996
Team	BAL	BOS	CAL	CWS	CLE	DET	KC	MIL	MIN	NYY	OAK	SEA	TEX	TOR
Baltimore	—	7–6	6–6	4–8	5–7	11–2	9–3	9–3	7–5	3–10	9–4	7–5	3–10–1	8–5
Boston	6–7	—	8–4	6–6	1–11	12–1	3–9	7–5	6–6	7–6	8–5	7–6	6–6	8–5
California	6–6	4–8	—	6–6	4–9	6–6	4–8	7–5	4–8	7–6	6–7	5–8	4–9	7–5
Chicago	8–4	6–6	6–6	—	5–8	10–3	7–6	6–7	6–7	6–7	5–7	5–7	8–4	7–5
Cleveland	7–5	11–1	9–4	8–5	—	12–0	7–6	7–6	10–3	3–9	6–6	8–4	4–8	7–5
Detroit	2–11	1–12	6–6	3–10	0–12	—	6–6	4–8	6–6	5–8	4–8	6–6	4–9	6–7
Kansas City	3–9	9–3	8–4	6–7	6–7	6–6	—	4–9	6–7	4–8	5–7	7–5	6–6	5–8
Milwaukee	3–9	5–7	5–7	7–6	6–7	8–4	9–4	—	9–4	6–6	7–5	4–9	6–7	5–7
Minnesota	5–7	6–6	8–4	7–6	3–10	6–6	7–6	4–9	—	5–7	6–7	6–6	7–5	8–5
New York	10–3	6–7	6–7	7–6	9–3	8–5	8–4	6–6	7–5	—	9–3	3–9	5–7	8–5
Oakland	4–9	5–8	7–6	7–5	6–6	8–4	7–5	5–7	7–6	3–9	—	8–5	7–6	4–8
Seattle	5–7	6–7	8–5	7–5	4–8	6–6	5–7	9–4	6–6	9–3	5–8	—	10–3	5–7
Texas	10–3–1	6–6	9–4	4–8	8–4	9–4	6–6	7–6	5–7	7–5	6–7	3–10	—	10–2
Toronto	5–8	5–8	5–7	5–7	5–7	7–6	8–5	7–5	5–8	5–8	8–4	7–5	2–10	—

=== Notable transactions ===
- April 13, 1996: Jack Voigt was signed as a free agent by the Rangers.
- June 4, 1996: Travis Hafner was drafted by the Rangers in the 31st round of the 1996 Major League Baseball draft. Player signed June 2, 1997.
- July 31, 1996: Mark Brandenburg and Kerry Lacy were traded by the Rangers to the Boston Red Sox for Mike Stanton and a player to be named later. The Red Sox completed the deal by sending Dwayne Hosey to the Rangers on November 4.

=== Roster ===
1996 Texas Rangers
Roster
Pitchers: 48 José Alberro; 51 Mark Brandenburg; 33 John Burkett; 42 Dennis Cook; 46 Kevin Gross; 32 Rick Helling; 39 Mike Henneman; 37 Gil Heredia; 44 Ken Hill; 28 Darren Oliver; 46 Danny Patterson; 59 Roger Pavlik; 40 Jeff Russell; 32 Mike Stanton; 52 Ed Vosberg; 27 Matt Whiteside; 36 Bobby Witt	Catchers: 6 Kevin Brown; 7 Iván Rodríguez; 10 Dave Valle; Infielders: 22 Will Clark; 18 Kevin Elster; 23 Benji Gil; 88 Rene Gonzales; 3 Mark McLemore; 16 Dean Palmer; 11 Lee Stevens; 1 Kurt Stillwell; 15 Mickey Tettleton; 24 Craig Worthington	Outfielders: 2 Damon Buford; 30 Rikkert Faneyte; 14 Lou Frazier; 19 Juan González; 29 Rusty Greer; 4 Darryl Hamilton; 21 Warren Newson; 24 Jack Voigt; Other batters: 9 Luis Ortiz	Manager: 26 Johnny Oates; Coaches: 17 Dick Bosman (pitching); 20 Bucky Dent (bench); 25 Larry Hardy (bullpen); 8 Rudy Jaramillo (hitting); 12 Ed Napoleon (first base); 5 Jerry Narron (third base)

== Game log ==
=== Game log ===
Legend
Rangers Win	Rangers Loss	Game postponed	Clinched playoff spot	Clinched Division
Bold denotes an Rangers pitcher

1996 regular season game log: 90–72 (Home: 50–31; Away: 40–41)
April: 16–10 (Home: 11–4; Away: 5–6)

#	Date	Time (CT)	Opponent	Score	Win	Loss	Save	Time of Game	Attendance	Record	Box/ Streak
1	April 1		Red Sox	5–3	**Hill** (1–0)	Clemens	**Vosberg** (1)		40,484	1–0	
2	April 3		Red Sox	7–2	**Pavlik** (1–0)	Gordon	—		24,483	2–0	
3	April 4		Red Sox	13–2	**Gross** (1–0)	Wakefield	—		18,086	3–0	
—	April 5	7:05 p.m. CST	Yankees	Postponed (rain); Makeup: April 7							
4	April 6	7:37 p.m. CST	Yankees	**W** 4–2	**Witt** (1–0)	Key (0–1)	**Henneman** (1)	2:48	35,510	4–0	W4
5 (1)	April 7	3:05 p.m. CDT	Yankees	**W** 7–2	**Hill** (2–0)	Gooden (0–1)	—	2:57	—	5–0	W5
6 (2)	April 7	7:05 p.m. CDT	Yankees	**W** 4–1	**Pavlik** (2–0)	Howe (0–1)	**Vosberg** (2)	2:52	36,248	6–0	W6
7	April 9		@ White Sox	3–2	**Gross** (2–0)	Thomas	**Henneman** (2)		34,750	7–0	
8	April 11		@ White Sox	5–8 (11)	Thomas	**Henneman** (0–1)		—	16,685	7–1	
9	April 12	6:35 p.m. CDT	@ Yankees	L 3–4	Cone (2–0)	**Hill** (2–1)	Wetteland (1)	2:51	20,238	7–2	L2
10	April 13	12:35 p.m. CDT	@ Yankees	**W**10–6	**Pavlik** (3–0)	Gooden (0–2)	**Vosberg** (3)	3:32	19,603	8–2	W1
11	April 14	12:35 p.m. CDT	@ Yankees	L 3–12	Pettitte (3–0)	**Gross** (2–1)	—	3:00	20,181	8–3	L1
12	April 15		Athletics	3–8	Mohler	**Heredia** (0–1)	—		19,312	8–4	
13	April 16		Athletics	5–3	**Witt** (2–0)	Johns	**Henneman** (3)		20,948	9–4	
14	April 17		Athletics	12–1	**Hill** (3–1)	Reyes	—		24,120	10–4	
15	April 19		Orioles	26–7	**Cook** (1–0)	Mercker	**Vosberg** (4)		41,184	11–4	
16	April 20		Orioles	8–3	**Gross** (3–1)	Haynes	—		45,358	12–4	
17	April 21		Orioles	9–6	**Oliver** (1–0)	Wells	—		39,456	13–4	
18	April 22		White Sox	4–12	Fernandez	**Witt** (2–1)	Karchner		22,348	13–5	
19	April 23		White Sox	5–6	Baldwin	**Hill** (3–2)	Hernandez		29,123	13–6	
20	April 24		@ Red Sox	9–11	Stanton	**Heredia** (0–2)	Slocumb		19,217	13–7	
21	April 25		@ Red Sox	3–8	Wakefield	**Gross** (3–2)	—		20,350	13–8	
22	April 26		@ Orioles	5–4	**Brandenburg** (1–0)	Wells	**Henneman** (4)		44,022	14–8	
23	April 27		@ Orioles	4–2	**Witt** (3–1)	Erickson	**Vosberg** (5)		47,311	15–8	
24	April 28		@ Orioles	5–4 (10)	**Heredia** (1–2)	McDowell	**Henneman** (5)		47,327	16–8	
25	April 29		@ Orioles	7–8	Haynes	**Helling** (0–1)	Myers		41,503	16–9	
26	April 30		Mariners	0–8	Bosio	**Gross** (3–3)	—		27,272	16–10	

May: 18–9 (Home: 11–3; Away: 7–6)

#	Date	Time (CT)	Opponent	Score	Win	Loss	Save	Time of Game	Attendance	Record	Box/ Streak
27	May 1		Mariners	5–4	**Russell** (1–0)	Jackson	**Henneman** (6)		31,775	17–10	
28	May 2		@ Tigers	2–5	Lira	**Witt** (3–2)	Williams		7,416	17–11	
29	May 3		@ Tigers	11–0	**Hill** (4–2)	Keagle	—		9,079	18–11	
30	May 4		@ Tigers	3–1	**Pavlik** (4–0)	Gohr	—		10,734	19–11	
31	May 5		@ Tigers	3–2	**Gross** (4–3)	Lima	**Henneman** (7)		12,337	20–11	
32	May 7		Blue Jays	5–1	**Oliver** (2–0)	Guzman	—		23,005	21–11	
33	May 8		Blue Jays	4–2	**Witt** (4–2)	Hanson	**Henneman** (8)		20,694	22–11	
34	May 9		Blue Jays	2–5	Quantrill	**Hill** (4–3)	Timlin		34,451	22–12	
35	May 10		Tigers	6–2	**Pavlik** (5–0)	Lima	**Henneman** (9)		31,426	23–12	
36	May 11		Tigers	11–7	**Gross** (5–3)	Aldred	—		42,732	24–12	
37	May 12		Tigers	3–5	Lira	**Oliver** (2–1)	Myers		35,677	24–13	
38	May 13		Royals	7–6	**Cook** (2–0)	Montgomery	**Henneman** (10)		22,981	25–13	
39	May 14		Royals	10–0	**Hill** (5–3)	Gubicza	—		28,999	26–13	
40	May 15		Royals	1–3	Haney	**Pavlik** (5–1)	Montgomery		26,881	26–14	
41	May 17		@ Indians	10–12	Embree	**Heredia** (1–3)	Mesa		41,225	26–15	
42	May 18		@ Indians	6–3	**Oliver** (3–1)	Anderson	**Henneman** (11)		40,973	27–15	
43	May 19		@ Indians	5–8	Nagy	**Witt** (4–3)	Mesa		43,299	27–16	
44	May 21		@ Twins	3–4	Milchin	**Henneman** (0–2)	—		12,323	27–17	
45	May 22		@ Twins	6–5	**Pavlik** (6–1)	Parra	**Henneman** (12)		17,955	28–17	
46	May 23		@ Royals	2–4	Appier	**Oliver** (3–2)	Montgomery		15,612	28–18	
47	May 24		@ Royals	0–8	Gubicza	**Witt** (4–4)	—		13,696	28–19	
48	May 25		@ Royals	2–1	**Helling** (1–1)	Haney	**Henneman** (13)		23,668	29–19	
49	May 26		@ Royals	6–4	**Hill** (6–3)	Linton	**Henneman** (14)		22,665	30–19	
50	May 27		Indians	3–2	**Pavlik** (7–1)	McDowell	—		46,521	31–19	
51	May 28		Indians	11–3	**Oliver** (4–2)	Hershiser	—		35,727	32–19	
52	May 29		Indians	5–4	**Cook** (3–0)	Tavarez	**Henneman** (15)		35,893	33–19	
53	May 31		Twins	7–2	**Hill** (7–3)	Rodriguez	—		32,861	34–19	

June: 14–13 (Home: 9–5; Away: 5–8)

#	Date	Time (CT)	Opponent	Score	Win	Loss	Save	Time of Game	Attendance	Record	Box/ Streak
54	June 1		Twins	5–9	Milchin	**Henneman** (0–3)	—		43,413	34–20	
55	June 2		Twins	5–6	Guardado	**Russell** (1–1)	—		33,809	34–21	
56	June 3		@ Brewers	9–6	**Witt** (5–4)	Sparks	**Henneman** (16)		9,748	35–21	
57	June 4		@ Brewers	2–6	Bones	**Gross** (5–4)	—		10,685	35–22	
58	June 5		@ Brewers	4–6	McDonald	**Hill** (7–4)	Fetters		11,276	35–23	
59	June 7		Blue Jays	10–7	**Pavlik** (8–1)	Janzen	**Henneman** (17)		40,046	36–23	
60	June 8		Blue Jays	2–0	**Oliver** (5–2)	Guzman	—		43,439	37–23	
61	June 9		Blue Jays	8–6	**Witt** (6–4)	Hanson	**Henneman** (18)		41,605	38–23	
62	June 10		Brewers	8–3	**Gross** (6–4)	Givens	—		43,275	39–23	
63	June 11		Brewers	4–14	McDonald	**Hill** (7–5)	Garcia		33,519	39–24	
64	June 12		Brewers	13–6	**Pavlik** (9–1)	Miranda	—		34,842	40–24	
65	June 13		@ Red Sox	7–8 (10)	Slocumb	**Henneman** (0–4)	—		32,645	40–25	
66	June 14		@ Red Sox	3–4	Stanton	**Witt** (6–5)	—		29,689	40–26	
67	June 15		@ Red Sox	13–3	**Gross** (7–4)	Wakefield	—		33,186	41–26	
68	June 16		@ Red Sox	9–10	Hudson	**Henneman** (0–5)	—		30,461	41–27	
69	June 17		@ Orioles	1–1 (6)				—	45,581	41–27	
70	June 18		@ Orioles	7–0	**Oliver** (6–2)	Mercker	—		47,318	42–27	
71	June 19		@ Orioles	3–2	**Witt** (7–5)	Mussina	**Russell** (1)		45,581	43–27	
72	June 20		@ Orioles	2–3	Wells	**Gross** (7–5)	Myers		21,748	43–28	
73	June 21		Red Sox	14–4	**Hill** (8–5)	Minchey	—		40,726	44–28	
74	June 22		Red Sox	8–2	**Pavlik** (10–1)	Wakefield	—		46,444	45–28	
75	June 23		Red Sox	4–6	Stanton	**Cook** (3–1)	Slocumb		39,399	45–29	
76	June 24		Orioles	3–8	Mussina	**Witt** (7–6)	—		39,701	45–30	
77	June 25		Orioles	5–2	**Gross** (8–5)	Wells	**Henneman** (19)		41,685	46–30	
78	June 26		Orioles	6–5	**Cook** (4–1)	Orosco	**Henneman** (20)		38,984	47–30	
79	June 28		@ Mariners	8–19	Carmona	**Pavlik** (10–2)	—		34,413	47–31	
80	June 29		@ Mariners	9–5	**Oliver** (7–2)	Meacham	—		37,556	48–31	
81	June 30		@ Mariners	3–4	Hitchcock	**Witt** (7–7)	Charlton		33,392	48–32	

July: 13–14 (Home: 6–7; Away: 7–7)

#	Date	Time (CT)	Opponent	Score	Win	Loss	Save	Time of Game	Attendance	Record	Box/ Streak
82	July 1		@ Angels	8–6	**Gross** (9–5)	Langston	**Henneman** (21)		19,754	49–32	
83	July 2		@ Angels	5–6	James	**Henneman** (0–6)	—		19,055	49–33	
84	July 3		@ Angels	8–1	**Pavlik** (11–2)	Finley	—		45,979	50–33	
85	July 4		Mariners	5–9	Carmona	**Henneman** (0–7)	—		46,668	50–34	
86	July 5		Mariners	3–6	Hitchcock	**Witt** (7–8)	—		46,397	50–35	
87	July 6		Mariners	5–9	Wagner	**Gross** (9–6)	—		46,458	50–36	
88	July 7		Mariners	8–3	**Hill** (9–5)	Wells	—		36,933	51–36	
—	July 9	7:30 p.m. CDT	**67th All-Star Game in Philadelphia, PA**								
89	July 11		@ Athletics	3–8	Chouinard	**Oliver** (7–3)	—		13,437	51–37	
90	July 12		@ Athletics	8–4 (10)	**Russell** (2–1)	Taylor	—		12,074	52–37	
91	July 13		@ Athletics	8–1	**Pavlik** (12–2)	Wengert	—		16,792	53–37	
92	July 14		@ Athletics	1–9	Johns	**Gross** (9–7)	—		20,704	53–38	
93	July 15		Angels	7–10	Schmidt	**Brandenburg** (1–1)	Percival		45,655	53–39	
94	July 16		Angels	6–2	**Oliver** (8–3)	Abbott	**Russell** (2)		34,680	54–39	
95	July 17		Angels	7–3	**Hill** (10–5)	Finley	—		44,220	55–39	
96	July 18		Athletics	4–5 (11)	Reyes	**Brandenburg** (1–2)	Van Poppel		28,585	55–40	
97	July 19		Athletics	6–9	Reyes	**Helling** (1–2)	Taylor		37,455	55–41	
98	July 20		Athletics	8–4	**Witt** (8–8)	Van Poppel	—		46,052	56–41	
99	July 21		Athletics	8–11	Groom	**Brandenburg** (1–3)	Mohler		36,039	56–42	
100	July 22	6:35 p.m. CDT	@ Yankees	**W** 6–1	**Hill** (11–5)	Rogers (6–5)	—	2:42	30,767	57–42	W1
101	July 23	6:35 p.m. CDT	@ Yankees	L 0–6	Gooden (10–5)	**Pavlik** (12–3)	—	2:39	22,814	57–43	L1
102	July 24	12:05 p.m. CDT	@ Yankees	L 2–4	Pettitte (15–5)	**Alberro** (0–1)	Wetteland (35)	2:36	35,308	57–44	L2
103	July 25		@ White Sox	4–3 (12)	**Russell** (3–1)	Keyser	**Henneman** (22)		19,524	58–44	
104	July 26		@ White Sox	2–6	Alvarez	**Oliver** (8–4)	—		21,398	58–45	
105	July 27		@ White Sox	6–4 (10)	**Heredia** (2–3)	Simas	**Vosberg** (6)		22,629	59–45	
106	July 28		@ White Sox	1–5	Fernandez	**Pavlik** (12–4)	—		20,902	59–46	
107	July 30	7:06 p.m. CDT	Yankees	**W** 15–2	**Witt** (9–8)	Pettitte (15–6)	—	2:37	39,637	60–46	W1
108	July 31	6:35 p.m. CDT	Yankees	**W** 9–2	**Oliver** (9–4)	Key (8–8)	—	3:03	30,645	61–46	W2

August: 16–12 (Home: 8–5; Away: 8–7)

#	Date	Time (CT)	Opponent	Score	Win	Loss	Save	Time of Game	Attendance	Record	Box/ Streak
109	August 1	7:35 p.m. CDT	Yankees	L 5–6	Rogers (8–5)	**Hill** (11–6)	Wetteland (37)	3:01	34,855	61–47	L1
110	August 2		White Sox	0–9	Fernandez	**Pavlik** (12–5)	—		36,299	61–48	
111	August 3		White Sox	9–11	Hernandez	**Russell** (3–2)	—		46,481	61–49	
112	August 4		White Sox	9–5	**Witt** (10–8)	Baldwin	—		32,854	62–49	
113	August 5		White Sox	5–15	Alvarez	**Oliver** (9–5)	—		29,973	62–50	
114	August 6		@ Tigers	4–2	**Hill** (12–6)	Lira	**Henneman** (23)		10,931	63–50	
115	August 7		@ Tigers	2–4	Cummings	**Pavlik** (12–6)	Myers		10,297	63–51	
116	August 8		@ Tigers	2–3	Olivares	**Heredia** (2–4)	—		10,995	63–52	
117	August 9		@ Blue Jays	5–4	**Witt** (11–8)	Quantrill	**Henneman** (24)		33,535	64–52	
118	August 10		@ Blue Jays	12–1	**Oliver** (10–5)	Guzman	—		34,109	65–52	
119	August 11		@ Blue Jays	6–0	**Burkett** (1–0)	Hanson	—		32,162	66–52	
120	August 12		Tigers	7–0	**Hill** (13–6)	Williams	—		25,210	67–52	
121	August 13		Tigers	6–2	**Pavlik** (13–6)	Olivares	—		31,331	68–52	
122	August 14		Tigers	5–4	**Witt** (12–8)	Van Poppel	**Henneman** (25)		33,942	69–52	
123	August 16		Royals	5–3	**Burkett** (2–0)	Haney	**Henneman** (26)		32,053	70–52	
124	August 17		Royals	1–4	Belcher	**Hill** (13–7)	—		41,855	70–53	
125	August 18		Royals	10–3	**Gross** (10–7)	Appier	—		30,480	71–53	
126	August 19		@ Indians	10–3	**Pavlik** (14–6)	McDowell	—		42,393	72–53	
127	August 20		@ Indians	4–10	Lopez	**Witt** (12–9)	—		42,370	72–54	
128	August 21		@ Indians	10–8 (10)	**Vosberg** (1–0)	Tavarez	—		42,345	73–54	
129	August 22		@ Twins	11–2	**Hill** (14–7)	Robertson	—		17,342	74–54	
130	August 23		@ Twins	2–9	Aguilera	**Oliver** (10–6)	—		16,166	74–55	
131	August 24		@ Twins	5–6	Rodriguez	**Pavlik** (14–7)	Trombley		16,648	74–56	
132	August 25		@ Twins	13–2	**Witt** (13–9)	Miller	—		14,818	75–56	
133	August 27		@ Royals	3–4 (10)	Montgomery	**Russell** (3–3)	—		12,907	75–57	
134	August 28		@ Royals	3–4 (12)	Huisman	**Gross** (10–8)	—		12,695	75–58	
135	August 30		Indians	5–3	**Pavlik** (15–7)	Ogea	**Russell** (3)		40,383	76–58	
136	August 31		Indians	6–3	**Oliver** (11–6)	McDowell	**Vosberg** (7)		46,319	77–58	

September: 13–14 (Home: 5–7; Away: 8–7)

#	Date	Time (CT)	Opponent	Score	Win	Loss	Save	Time of Game	Attendance	Record	Box/ Streak
137	September 1		Indians	2–8	Nagy	**Burkett** (2–1)	—		46,084	77–59	
138	September 2		Twins	4–6	Aguilera	**Hill** (14–8)	Guardado		24,786	77–60	
139	September 3		Twins	9–7	**Witt** (14–9)	Rodriguez	**Henneman** (27)		28,401	78–60	
140	September 4		Twins	6–7	Robertson	**Heredia** (2–5)	Trombley		29,744	78–61	
141	September 6		@ Brewers	7–3	**Burkett** (3–1)	Eldred	—		16,714	79–61	
142	September 7		@ Brewers	2–1	**Hill** (15–8)	McDonald	**Henneman** (28)		19,110	80–61	
143	September 8		@ Brewers	7–1	**Witt** (15–9)	Florie	—		17,542	81–61	
144	September 9		@ Blue Jays	4–3	**Gross** (11–8)	Hentgen	**Henneman** (29)		25,825	82–61	
145	September 10		@ Blue Jays	11–8	**Oliver** (12–6)	Williams	**Henneman** (30)		26,286	83–61	
146	September 11		@ Blue Jays	3–8	Andujar	**Vosberg** (1–1)	—		27,262	83–62	
147	September 12		Brewers	4–15	McDonald	**Hill** (15–9)	—		41,303	83–63	
148	September 13		Brewers	3–6	D'Amico	**Witt** (15–10)	Fetters		39,235	83–64	
149	September 14		Brewers	6–8	Karl	**Pavlik** (15–8)	Fetters		45,901	83–65	
150	September 15		Brewers	6–2	**Oliver** (13–6)	Garcia	**Vosberg** (8)		45,941	84–65	
151	September 16		@ Mariners	0–6	Moyer	**Burkett** (3–2)	—		50,544	84–66	
152	September 17		@ Mariners	2–5	Mulholland	**Hill** (15–10)	Ayala		32,279	84–67	
153	September 18		@ Mariners	2–5	Hitchcock	**Witt** (15–11)	Charlton		35,162	84–68	
154	September 19		@ Mariners	6–7	Davis	**Cook** (4–2)	Charlton		39,769	84–69	
155	September 20		@ Angels	5–6 (10)	McElroy	**Stanton** (0–1)	—		18,860	84–70	
156	September 21		@ Angels	7–1	**Burkett** (4–2)	Abbott	—		24,104	85–70	
157	September 22		@ Angels	4–1	**Hill** (16–10)	Dickson	—		17,522	86–70	
158	September 23		@ Athletics	3–5	Wasdin	**Witt** (15–12)	Taylor		10,164	86–71	
159	September 24		@ Athletics	7–3	**Cook** (5–2)	Small	—		9,694	87–71	
160	September 26		Angels	6–5	**Burkett** (5–2)	Abbott	**Henneman** (31)		33,895	88–71	
161	September 27		Angels	3–4 (15)	Harris	**Whiteside** (0–1)	Gohr		46,764	88–72	
162	September 28		Angels	4–3	**Oliver** (14–6)	Finley	**Heredia** (1)		45,651	89–72	
163	September 29		Angels	4–3	**Witt** (16–12)	Springer	—		45,434	90–72	

=== Detailed records ===
**American League**
Opponent	Home	Away	Total	Pct.	Runs scored	Runs allowed
**AL East**
Baltimore Orioles	5–1	5–2	10–3	.769	91	55
New York Yankees	5–1	2–4	7–5	.583	68	48
	**10–2**	**7–6**	**17–8**	**.680**	**159**	**103**
**AL Central**
	**0–0**	**0–0**	**0–0**	–	**0**	**0**
**AL West**
**Texas Rangers**	—	—	—	—	—	—
	**0–0**	**0–0**	**0–0**	–	**0**	**0**

=== Postseason Game log ===
Legend
Rangers Win	Rangers Loss
Bold denotes an Rangers pitcher

1996 Postseason game log: 1–3 (Home: 0–2; Away: 1–1)
AL Division Series vs. New York Yankees 1–3 (Home: 0–2; Away: 1–1)

#	Date	Time (CT)	Opponent	Score	Win	Loss	Save	Time of Game	Attendance	Series	Box/ Streak
1	October 1	7:15 p.m. CDT	@ Yankees	**W** 6–2	**Burkett** (1–0)	Cone (0–1)	—	2:50	57,205	TEX 1–0	W1
2	October 2	7:05 p.m. CDT	@ Yankees	L 4–5 (12)	Boehringer (1–0)	**Stanton** (0–1)	—	4:25	57,156	Tied 1–1	L1
3	October 4	7:07 p.m. CDT	Yankees	L 2–3	Nelson (1–0)	**Oliver** (0–1)	Wetteland (1)	3:09	50,860	NYY 2–1	L2
4	October 5	12:08 p.m. CDT	Yankees	L 4–6	Weathers (1–0)	**Pavlik** (0–1)	Wetteland (2)	3:57	50,066	NYY 3–1	L3

== Player stats ==
= Indicates team leader

=== Batting ===
==== Starters by position ====
Note: Pos = Position; G = Games played; AB = At bats; H = Hits; Avg. = Batting average; HR = Home runs; RBI = Runs batted in

Pos	Player	G	AB	H	Avg.	HR	RBI
C	Iván Rodríguez	153	649	192	.300	19	86
1B	Will Clark	117	436	124	.284	13	72
2B	Mark McLemore	147	517	150	.290	5	46
SS	Kevin Elster	157	515	130	.252	24	99
3B	Dean Palmer	154	582	163	.280	38	107
LF	Rusty Greer	139	542	180	.332	18	100
CF	Darryl Hamilton	148	627	184	.293	6	51
RF	Juan González	134	541	170	.314	47	144
DH	Mickey Tettleton	143	491	121	.246	24	83

==== Other batters ====
Note: G = Games played; AB = At bats; H = Hits; Avg. = Batting average; HR = Home runs; RBI = Runs batted in

Player	G	AB	H	Avg.	HR	RBI
Warren Newson	91	235	60	.255	10	31
Damon Buford	90	145	41	.283	6	20
Rene Gonzales	51	92	20	.217	2	5
Dave Valle	42	86	26	.302	3	17
Lee Stevens	27	78	18	.231	3	12
Kurt Stillwell	46	77	21	.273	1	4
Lou Frazier	30	50	13	.260	0	5
Craig Worthington	13	19	3	.158	1	4
Jack Voigt	5	9	1	.111	0	0
Luis Ortiz	3	7	2	.286	1	1
Rikkert Faneyte	8	5	1	.200	0	1
Benji Gil	7	5	2	.400	0	1
Kevin Brown	3	4	0	.000	0	1

=== Pitching ===
==== Starting pitchers ====
Note: G = Games pitched; IP = Innings pitched; W = Wins; L = Losses; ERA = Earned run average; SO = Strikeouts

Player	G	IP	W	L	ERA	SO
Ken Hill	35	250.2	16	10	3.63	170
Roger Pavlik	34	201.0	15	8	5.19	127
Bobby Witt	33	199.2	16	12	5.41	157
Darren Oliver	30	173.2	14	6	4.66	112
Kevin Gross	28	129.1	11	8	5.22	78
John Burkett	10	68.2	5	2	4.06	47

==== Other pitchers ====
Note: G = Games pitched; IP = Innings pitched; W = Wins; L = Losses; ERA = Earned run average; SO = Strikeouts

Player	G	IP	W	L	ERA	SO
Rick Helling	6	20.1	1	2	7.52	16
José Alberro	5	9.1	0	1	5.79	2

==== Relief pitchers ====
Note: G = Games pitched; W = Wins; L = Losses; SV = Saves; ERA = Earned run average; SO = Strikeouts

Player	G	W	L	SV	ERA	SO
Mike Henneman	49	0	7	31	5.79	34
Dennis Cook	60	5	2	0	4.09	64
Jeff Russell	55	3	3	3	3.38	23
Ed Vosberg	52	1	1	8	3.27	32
Gil Heredia	44	2	5	1	5.89	43
Mark Brandenburg	26	1	3	0	3.21	37
Mike Stanton	22	0	1	0	3.22	14
Matt Whiteside	14	0	1	0	6.68	15
Danny Patterson	7	0	0	0	0.00	5

== ALDS ==
=== Game 1, October 1 ===
Yankee Stadium, The Bronx, New York

Team	1	2	3	4	5	6	7	8	9	R	H	E
Texas	0	0	0	5	0	1	0	0	0	6	8	0
New York	1	0	0	1	0	0	0	0	0	2	10	0
WP: John Burkett (1-0) LP: David Cone (0-1); Home runs: Tex: Juan González (1), Dean Palmer (1); NYY: None

=== Game 2, October 2 ===
Yankee Stadium, The Bronx, New York

Team	1	2	3	4	5	6	7	8	9	10	11	12	R	H	E
Texas	0	1	3	0	0	0	0	0	0	0	0	0	4	8	1
New York	0	1	0	1	0	0	1	1	0	0	0	1	5	8	0
WP: Brian Boehringer (1-0) LP: Mike Stanton (0-1); Home runs: Tex: Juan González (2, 3); NYY: Cecil Fielder (1)

=== Game 3, October 4 ===
The Ballpark in Arlington, Arlington, Texas

Team	1	2	3	4	5	6	7	8	9	R	H	E
New York	1	0	0	0	0	0	0	0	2	3	7	1
Texas	0	0	0	1	1	0	0	0	0	2	6	1
WP: Jeff Nelson (1-0) LP: Darren Oliver (0-1) Sv: John Wetteland (1); Home runs: NYY: Bernie Williams (1); Tex: Juan González (4)

=== Game 4, October 5 ===
The Ballpark in Arlington, Arlington, Texas

Team	1	2	3	4	5	6	7	8	9	R	H	E
New York	0	0	0	3	1	0	1	0	1	6	12	1
Texas	0	2	2	0	0	0	0	0	0	4	9	0
WP: David Weathers (1-0) LP: Roger Pavlik (0-1) Sv: John Wetteland (2); Home runs: NYY: Bernie Williams (2, 3); Tex: Juan González (5)

== Awards and honors ==
- Kevin Elster, Comeback Player of The Year
- Juan González, AL MVP
- Juan González, Silver Slugger Award
- Johnny Oates, AL Managers of the Year (was co-manager with Joe Torre)
- Iván Rodríguez, C, Gold Glove
- Iván Rodríguez, Silver Slugger Award

All-Star Game

== Farm system ==
Level	Team	League	Manager
AAA	Oklahoma City 89ers	American Association	Greg Biagini
AA	Tulsa Drillers	Texas League	Bobby Jones
A	Charlotte Rangers	Florida State League	Butch Wynegar
A	Charleston RiverDogs	South Atlantic League	Gary Allenson
A-Short Season	Hudson Valley Renegades	New York–Penn League	Bump Wills
Rookie	GCL Rangers	Gulf Coast League	Jim Byrd

LEAGUE CHAMPIONS: Oklahoma City Hudson Valley affiliation shared with Tampa Bay Devil Rays
