= 1996 Detroit Tigers season =

Major League Baseball season

1996 Detroit Tigers
- League: American League
- Division: East
- Ballpark: Tiger Stadium
- City: Detroit, Michigan
- Record: 53–109 (.327)
- Divisional place: 5th
- Owners: Mike Ilitch
- General managers: Randy Smith
- Managers: Buddy Bell
- Television: WKBD (George Kell, Al Kaline); PASS (Ernie Harwell, Fred McLeod, Jim Price)
- Radio: WJR (Frank Beckmann, Lary Sorensen)

The 1996 Detroit Tigers season was the team's 96th season and the 85th season at Tiger Stadium. The Tigers finished with a record of 53–109 for what was, at the time, the most overall losses (109) and worst winning percentage (.327) in a 162-game season in team history — both of which have since been surpassed by the 2003 and 2019 teams.

With a number of capable batters (Cecil Fielder, Tony Clark, Bobby Higginson, Alan Trammell, Rubén Sierra, and Damion Easley), the team scored a respectable 783 runs. However, the 1996 Tigers lacked pitching, allowing their opponents to score 1,103 runs and posting a team ERA of 6.38. The team's pitchers recorded 6,713 batters faced, more than any other team in MLB history. No team in American League history and only one in major league history (the 1930 Philadelphia Phillies) has given up more runs. No pitcher on the team had more than 7 wins. Of the 109 losses, 58 were by four or more runs — a record for the number of games lost by such a margin. The Tigers made more unwanted history when they were swept 12–0 by the Cleveland Indians in the regular season series, losing all twelve games played while being outscored, 79–28. The 1996 Tigers did not have a winning record against any AL opponent.

== Regular season ==
=== Opening Day roster ===
- Chad Curtis CF
- Bobby Higginson RF
- Travis Fryman 3B
- Cecil Fielder 1B
- Melvin Nieves LF
- Eddie Williams DH
- Mark Lewis 2B
- John Flaherty C
- Alan Trammell SS
- Felipe Lira SP

=== Season standings ===
AL East
Team	W	L	Pct.	GB	Home	Road
New York Yankees	92	70	.568	—	49‍–‍31	43‍–‍39
Baltimore Orioles	88	74	.543	4	43‍–‍38	45‍–‍36
Boston Red Sox	85	77	.525	7	47‍–‍34	38‍–‍43
Toronto Blue Jays	74	88	.457	18	35‍–‍46	39‍–‍42
Detroit Tigers	53	109	.327	39	27‍–‍54	26‍–‍55

=== Record vs. opponents ===
1996 American League record Source: MLB Standings Grid – 1996
Team	BAL	BOS	CAL	CWS	CLE	DET	KC	MIL	MIN	NYY	OAK	SEA	TEX	TOR
Baltimore	—	7–6	6–6	4–8	5–7	11–2	9–3	9–3	7–5	3–10	9–4	7–5	3–10–1	8–5
Boston	6–7	—	8–4	6–6	1–11	12–1	3–9	7–5	6–6	7–6	8–5	7–6	6–6	8–5
California	6–6	4–8	—	6–6	4–9	6–6	4–8	7–5	4–8	7–6	6–7	5–8	4–9	7–5
Chicago	8–4	6–6	6–6	—	5–8	10–3	7–6	6–7	6–7	6–7	5–7	5–7	8–4	7–5
Cleveland	7–5	11–1	9–4	8–5	—	12–0	7–6	7–6	10–3	3–9	6–6	8–4	4–8	7–5
Detroit	2–11	1–12	6–6	3–10	0–12	—	6–6	4–8	6–6	5–8	4–8	6–6	4–9	6–7
Kansas City	3–9	9–3	8–4	6–7	6–7	6–6	—	4–9	6–7	4–8	5–7	7–5	6–6	5–8
Milwaukee	3–9	5–7	5–7	7–6	6–7	8–4	9–4	—	9–4	6–6	7–5	4–9	6–7	5–7
Minnesota	5–7	6–6	8–4	7–6	3–10	6–6	7–6	4–9	—	5–7	6–7	6–6	7–5	8–5
New York	10–3	6–7	6–7	7–6	9–3	8–5	8–4	6–6	7–5	—	9–3	3–9	5–7	8–5
Oakland	4–9	5–8	7–6	7–5	6–6	8–4	7–5	5–7	7–6	3–9	—	8–5	7–6	4–8
Seattle	5–7	6–7	8–5	7–5	4–8	6–6	5–7	9–4	6–6	9–3	5–8	—	10–3	5–7
Texas	10–3–1	6–6	9–4	4–8	8–4	9–4	6–6	7–6	5–7	7–5	6–7	3–10	—	10–2
Toronto	5–8	5–8	5–7	5–7	5–7	7–6	8–5	7–5	5–8	5–8	8–4	7–5	2–10	—

=== Game log ===
1996 Game Log: 53–109 (Home: 27–54; Away: 26–55)
April: 9–18 (Home: 5–6; Away: 4–12)

#	Date	Opponent	Score	Win	Loss	Save	Attendance	Record
1	April 1	@ Twins	6–8	Radke	**Lira** (0–1)	Stevens	30,185	0–1
2	April 2	@ Twins	10–6	**Sodowsky** (1–0)	Robertson	—	20,164	1–1
3	April 3	@ Twins	7–16	Mahomes	**Aldred** (0–1)	—	12,256	1–2
4	April 4	@ Athletics	10–9 (15)	**Keagle** (1–0)	Small	—	8,346	2–2
5	April 5	@ Athletics	2–13	Johns	**Gohr** (0–1)	—	11,149	2–3
6	April 6	@ Athletics	6–1	**Lira** (1–1)	Reyes	—	10,424	3–3
7	April 7	@ Athletics	6–7	Corsi	**Williams** (0–1)	—	9,723	3–4
8	April 9	Mariners	10–9	**Keagle** (2–0)	Menhart	**Williams** (1)	42,932	4–4
9	April 10	Mariners	7–3	**Olivares** (1–0)	Hurtado	—	9,299	5–4
10	April 11	Mariners	1–9	Johnson	**Gohr** (0–2)	—	12,272	5–5
11	April 12	Angels	4–5	Finley	**Lira** (1–2)	Percival	9,921	5–6
12	April 13	Angels	9–5	**Keagle** (3–0)	Sanderson	—	11,719	6–6
13	April 14	Angels	5–4	**Lewis** (1–0)	James	—	12,009	7–6
14	April 15	@ Blue Jays	2–8	Guzman	**Olivares** (1–1)	—	26,127	7–7
15	April 16	@ Blue Jays	13–8	**Gohr** (1–2)	Hanson	**Lewis** (1)	25,503	8–7
16	April 17	@ Mariners	3–8	Jackson	**Veres** (0–1)	—	18,008	8–8
17	April 18	@ Mariners	3–11	Bosio	**Sodowsky** (1–1)	Hurtado	17,536	8–9
18	April 19	@ Angels	3–4	Langston	**Myers** (0–1)	—	32,693	8–10
19	April 20	@ Angels	1–2	Grimsley	**Keagle** (3–1)	Percival	25,685	8–11
20	April 21	@ Angels	5–6	Eichhorn	**Lewis** (1–1)	Percival	36,733	8–12
21	April 22	@ Angels	5–6	James	**Christopher** (0–1)	Percival	17,039	8–13
22	April 24	Twins	11–24	Bennett	**Veres** (0–2)	—	12,189	8–14
23	April 25	Twins	1–11	Hawkins	**Aldred** (0–2)	Hansell	11,804	8–15
24	April 26	Athletics	14–5	**Christopher** (1–1)	Johns	—	7,941	9–15
25	April 27	Athletics	1–4	Reyes	**Lira** (1–3)	Taylor	13,067	9–16
26	April 28	Athletics	3–6	Wojciechowski	**Gohr** (1–3)	Taylor	8,907	9–17
27	April 30	@ Red Sox	4–13	Wakefield	**Lima** (0–1)	—	18,504	9–18

May: 4–23 (Home: 1–11; Away: 3–12)

#	Date	Opponent	Score	Win	Loss	Save	Attendance	Record
28	May 1	@ Red Sox	1–5	Clemens	**Aldred** (0–3)	—	20,828	9–19
29	May 2	Rangers	5–2	**Lira** (2–3)	Witt	**Williams** (2)	7,416	10–19
30	May 3	Rangers	0–11	Hill	**Keagle** (3–2)	—	9,079	10–20
31	May 4	Rangers	1–3	Pavlik	**Gohr** (1–4)	—	10,734	10–21
32	May 5	Rangers	2–3	Gross	**Lima** (0–2)	Henneman	12,337	10–22
33	May 6	@ Yankees	5–10	Wickman	**Myers** (0–2)	—	12,838	10–23
34	May 7	@ Yankees	5–12	Mecir	**Lewis** (1–2)	Nelson	12,760	10–24
35	May 8	@ Yankees	3–10	Gooden	**Keagle** (3–3)	—	18,729	10–25
36	May 9	@ Yankees	4–2	**Gohr** (2–4)	Key	**Myers** (1)	13,098	11–25
37	May 10	@ Rangers	2–6	Pavlik	**Lima** (0–3)	Henneman	31,426	11–26
38	May 11	@ Rangers	7–11	Gross	**Aldred** (0–4)	—	42,732	11–27
39	May 12	@ Rangers	5–3	**Lira** (3–3)	Oliver	**Myers** (2)	35,677	12–27
40	May 14	@ Indians	1–5	Nagy	**Gohr** (2–5)	—	40,765	12–28
41	May 15	@ Indians	2–5	Martinez	**Lima** (0–4)	Mesa	42,259	12–29
42	May 16	@ Indians	3–8	McDowell	**Williams** (0–2)	—	42,330	12–30
43	May 17	White Sox	6–11 (10)	Hernandez	**Lewis** (1–3)	—	12,094	12–31
44	May 18	White Sox	4–16	McCaskill	**Farrell** (0–1)	Simas	21,673	12–32
45	May 19	White Sox	3–14	Alvarez	**Gohr** (2–6)	—	9,709	12–33
46	May 21	Royals	1–7	Linton	**Williams** (0–3)	Valera	24,372	12–34
47	May 22	Royals	4–6	Belcher	**Farrell** (0–2)	Montgomery	12,890	12–35
48	May 24	Indians	3–6	Plunk	**Veres** (0–3)	Mesa	26,967	12–36
49	May 25	Indians	6–7	Nagy	**Lewis** (1–4)	Mesa	41,527	12–37
50	May 26	Indians	0–5	Martinez	**Williams** (0–4)	—	39,056	12–38
51	May 27	@ Royals	4–5 (13)	Montgomery	**Veres** (0–4)	—	19,776	12–39
52	May 29	@ Royals	5–4	**Gohr** (3–6)	Appier	**Walker** (1)	13,712	13–39
53	May 30	@ White Sox	2–8	Alvarez	**Olivares** (1–2)	—	17,339	13–40
54	May 31	@ White Sox	0–9	Tapani	**Lira** (3–4)	—	16,983	13–41

June: 10–17 (Home: 6–7; Away: 4–10)

#	Date	Opponent	Score	Win	Loss	Save	Attendance	Record
55	June 2	@ White Sox	2–4	Baldwin	**Thompson** (0–1)	Hernandez	—	13–42
56	June 2	@ White Sox	5–13	McCaskill	**Keagle** (3–4)	—	26,125	13–43
57	June 4	@ Orioles	7–10	Mussina	**Gohr** (3–7)	Myers	43,727	13–44
58	June 5	@ Orioles	4–6	Rhodes	**Myers** (0–3)	Myers	43,087	13–45
59	June 6	@ Orioles	6–13	Krivda	**Lira** (3–5)	—	46,269	13–46
60	June 7	Yankees	6–5	**Lewis** (2–4)	Nelson	—	16,350	14–46
61	June 8	Yankees	9–7	**Olson** (1–0)	Rogers	**Lewis** (2)	20,173	15–46
62	June 9	Yankees	2–3	Gooden	**Gohr** (3–8)	Wetteland	16,588	15–47
63	June 10	Orioles	8–3	**Olivares** (2–2)	Wells	—	10,655	16–47
64	June 11	Orioles	9–12	Coppinger	**Lira** (3–6)	—	10,874	16–48
65	June 12	Orioles	7–10	Rhodes	**Lewis** (2–5)	Myers	12,043	16–49
66	June 14	@ Twins	5–4	**Gohr** (4–8)	Robertson	**Olson** (1)	22,831	17–49
67	June 15	@ Twins	6–4	**Olivares** (3–2)	Rodriguez	**Olson** (2)	17,099	18–49
68	June 16	@ Twins	1–4	Aguilera	**Lira** (3–7)	Hansell	20,641	18–50
69	June 17	Athletics	4–8 (10)	Corsi	**Myers** (0–4)	—	9,231	18–51
70	June 18	Athletics	5–8	Van Poppel	**Urbani** (0–1)	Taylor	8,543	18–52
71	June 19	Athletics	3–10	Wasdin	**Keagle** (3–5)	—	9,875	18–53
72	June 20	Twins	3–7	Rodriguez	**Olivares** (3–3)	—	8,310	18–54
73	June 21	Twins	2–0	**Lira** (4–7)	Aguilera	—	13,127	19–54
74	June 22	Twins	6–0	**Williams** (1–4)	Aldred	—	14,506	20–54
75	June 23	Twins	10–8	**Urbani** (1–1)	Radke	—	13,994	21–54
76	June 24	@ Athletics	2–4	Wasdin	**Sodowsky** (1–2)	Taylor	10,122	21–55
77	June 25	@ Athletics	10–8	**Olivares** (4–3)	Wengert	**Olson** (3)	9,652	22–55
78	June 27	@ Red Sox	9–6	**Lira** (5–7)	Minchey	—	29,582	23–55
79	June 28	@ Red Sox	5–8	Wakefield	**Williams** (1–5)	—	27,578	23–56
80	June 29	@ Red Sox	6–13	Eshelman	**Keagle** (3–6)	—	33,509	23–57
81	June 30	@ Red Sox	4–9	Gordon	**Sodowsky** (1–3)	—	31,217	23–58

July: 12–14 (Home: 6–7; Away: 6–7)

#	Date	Opponent	Score	Win	Loss	Save	Attendance	Record
82	July 1	Brewers	0–2	Sparks	**Olivares** (4–4)	Fetters	10,727	23–59
83	July 2	Brewers	1–2 (11)	Garcia	**Sager** (0–1)	Fetters	9,455	23–60
84	July 3	Brewers	8–5	**Williams** (2–5)	D'Amico	—	11,047	24–60
85	July 4	Blue Jays	6–1	**Nitkowski** (1–0)	Janzen	**Myers** (6)	10,557	25–60
86	July 5	Blue Jays	4–3	**Sager** (1–1)	Hanson	**Olson** (4)	20,808	26–60
87	July 6	Blue Jays	0–15	Hentgen	**Olivares** (4–5)	—	16,228	26–61
88	July 7	Blue Jays	9–0	**Lira** (6–7)	Ware	—	15,784	27–61
89	July 11	Red Sox	4–11	Clemens	**Williams** (2–6)	—	15,826	27–62
90	July 12	Red Sox	3–11	Gordon	**Olivares** (4–6)	—	19,535	27–63
91	July 13	Red Sox	5–10	Sele	**Nitkowski** (1–1)	—	16,671	27–64
92	July 14	Red Sox	4–6	Moyer	**Lira** (6–8)	Slocumb	19,670	27–65
93	July 15	@ Brewers	10–9	**Sager** (2–1)	Bones	**Olson** (5)	15,819	28–65
94	July 16	@ Brewers	7–20	D'Amico	**Williams** (2–7)	—	12,476	28–66
95	July 17	@ Brewers	2–3 (10)	Fetters	**Urbani** (1–2)	—	21,121	28–67
96	July 18	@ Blue Jays	4–8	Hentgen	**Nitkowski** (1–2)	—	31,202	28–68
97	July 19	@ Blue Jays	8–6	**Urbani** (2–2)	Janzen	**Olson** (6)	30,123	29–68
98	July 20	@ Blue Jays	5–4 (10)	**Olson** (2–0)	Quantrill	**Lima** (1)	36,220	30–68
99	July 21	@ Blue Jays	4–5 (12)	Spoljaric	**Lima** (0–5)	—	33,238	30–69
100	July 22	@ Angels	0–1	Finley	**Olivares** (4–7)	Percival	16,336	30–70
101	July 23	@ Angels	8–3	**Lima** (1–5)	James	—	16,432	31–70
102	July 25	@ Mariners	7–4 (10)	**Lima** (2–5)	Ayala	—	19,949	32–70
103	July 26	@ Mariners	4–6	Hitchcock	**Sager** (2–2)	Jackson	25,175	32–71
104	July 27	@ Mariners	7–13	Davis	**Williams** (2–8)	—	43,209	32–72
105	July 28	@ Mariners	14–6	**Olivares** (5–7)	Bosio	—	38,204	33–72
106	July 30	Angels	12–9	**Nitkowski** (2–2)	Grimsley	—	11,641	34–72
107	July 31	Angels	10–5	**Lima** (3–5)	Holtz	—	9,740	35–72

August: 14–15 (Home: 9–7; Away: 5–8)

#	Date	Opponent	Score	Win	Loss	Save	Attendance	Record
108	August 1	Angels	13–5	**Williams** (3–8)	Boskie	—	14,591	36–72
109	August 2	Mariners	8–2	**Olivares** (6–7)	Wagner	—	23,405	37–72
110	August 3	Mariners	6–3	**Olson** (3–0)	Charlton	—	25,928	38–72
111	August 4	Mariners	3–9	Wolcott	**Nitkowski** (2–3)	—	23,569	38–73
112	August 6	Rangers	2–4	Hill	**Lira** (6–9)	Henneman	10,931	38–74
113	August 7	Rangers	4–2	**Cummings** (1–0)	Pavlik	**Myers** (7)	10,297	39–74
114	August 8	Rangers	3–2	**Olivares** (7–7)	Heredia	—	10,995	40–74
115	August 9	@ Yankees	5–3	**Cummings** (2–0)	Pettitte	**Myers** (8)	23,439	41–74
116	August 10	@ Yankees	13–7	**Lewis** (3–5)	Key	—	28,863	42–74
117	August 11	@ Yankees	0–12	Rogers	**Lira** (6–10)	—	33,517	42–75
118	August 12	@ Rangers	0–7	Hill	**Williams** (3–9)	—	25,210	42–76
119	August 13	@ Rangers	2–6	Pavlik	**Olivares** (7–8)	—	31,331	42–77
120	August 14	@ Rangers	4–5	Witt	**Van Poppel** (0–1)	Henneman	33,942	42–78
121	August 16	@ Indians	1–3 (12)	Assenmacher	**Lewis** (3–6)	—	42,485	42–79
122	August 17	@ Indians	3–6	Hershiser	**Thompson** (0–2)	Mesa	42,511	42–80
123	August 18	@ Indians	3–11	Ogea	**Williams** (3–10)	—	42,337	42–81
124	August 19	White Sox	7–12	Simas	**Lima** (3–6)	—	14,690	42–82
125	August 20	White Sox	16–11	**Lewis** (4–6)	Tapani	—	12,119	43–82
126	August 21	White Sox	7–4	**Lima** (4–6)	Simas	**Olson** (7)	13,424	44–82
127	August 22	@ Royals	10–3	**Thompson** (1–2)	Belcher	—	14,699	45–82
128	August 23	@ Royals	3–2	**Sager** (3–2)	Appier	**Olson** (8)	15,603	46–82
129	August 24	@ Royals	2–9	Rosado	**Olivares** (7–9)	—	28,011	46–83
130	August 25	@ Royals	7–4	**Van Poppel** (1–1)	Linton	**Myers** (9)	15,123	47–83
131	August 26	Indians	1–2	Nagy	**Lira** (6–11)	—	22,349	47–84
132	August 27	Indians	2–12	Lopez	**Thompson** (1–3)	—	19,602	47–85
133	August 28	Indians	3–9	Hershiser	**Sager** (3–3)	—	21,091	47–86
134	August 29	Royals	4–1	**Eischen** (1–0)	Appier	**Lima** (2)	7,882	48–86
135	August 30	Royals	4–0	**Van Poppel** (2–1)	Rosado	—	16,498	49–86
136	August 31	Royals	1–3	Linton	**Lira** (6–12)	Montgomery	16,270	49–87

September: 4–22 (Home: 0–16; Away: 4–6)

#	Date	Opponent	Score	Win	Loss	Save	Attendance	Record
137	September 1	Royals	2–3 (13)	Huisman	**Myers** (0–5)	Jacome	17,647	49–88
138	September 2	@ White Sox	8–6	**Myers** (1–5)	Hernandez	**Lima** (3)	19,599	50–88
139	September 3	@ White Sox	4–6	Bertotti	**Olivares** (7–10)	Hernandez	13,857	50–89
140	September 4	@ White Sox	6–11	Castillo	**Miller** (0–1)	—	15,120	50–90
141	September 6	@ Orioles	5–4 (12)	**Cummings** (3–0)	Mathews	—	46,708	51–90
142	September 7	@ Orioles	0–6	Mussina	**Thompson** (1–4)	—	47,131	51–91
143	September 8	@ Orioles	2–6	Mills	**Eischen** (1–1)	—	47,082	51–92
144	September 9	@ Orioles	4–5	Erickson	**Olivares** (7–11)	Myers	42,562	51–93
145	September 10	Yankees	8–9	Rivera	**Sager** (3–4)	Wetteland	11,042	51–94
146	September 11	Yankees	3–7	Key	**Lira** (6–13)	—	9,775	51–95
147	September 12	Yankees	3–12	Cone	**Thompson** (1–5)	—	9,009	51–96
148	September 13	Orioles	4–7	Erickson	**Miller** (0–2)	Mills	11,178	51–97
149	September 14	Orioles	6–7	Mathews	**Cummings** (3–1)	Myers	15,386	51–98
150	September 15	Orioles	6–16	Corbin	**Van Poppel** (2–2)	—	13,764	51–99
151	September 17	Red Sox	2–4	Brandenburg	**Lira** (6–14)	Slocumb	8,180	51–100
152	September 18	Red Sox	0–4	Clemens	**Thompson** (1–6)	—	8,779	51–101
153	September 19	Red Sox	3–8	Gordon	**Miller** (0–3)	—	7,666	51–102
154	September 20	@ Brewers	10–1	**Sager** (4–4)	Karl	—	15,046	52–102
155	September 21	@ Brewers	6–13	D'Amico	**Van Poppel** (2–3)	Villone	33,106	52–103
156	September 22	@ Brewers	7–5	**Lima** (5–6)	Fetters	—	15,705	53–103
157	September 23	Blue Jays	4–6	Hanson	**Sager** (4–5)	Timlin	9,678	53–104
158	September 24	Blue Jays	1–4	Hentgen	**Miller** (0–4)	Timlin	8,355	53–105
159	September 25	Blue Jays	11–13	Brow	**Cummings** (3–2)	Timlin	8,055	53–106
160	September 27	Brewers	6–7 (6)	Wickman	**Van Poppel** (2–4)	—	8,606	53–107
161	September 28	Brewers	2–7	Eldred	**Moehler** (0–1)	—	12,939	53–108
162	September 29	Brewers	5–7 (10)	Reyes	**Cummings** (3–3)	Fetters	13,038	53–109

Legend: = Win = Loss
Bold = Tigers team member

=== Detailed records ===
American League
Opponent	W	L	WP	RS	RA
AL East
Baltimore Orioles	2	11	0.154	68	105
Boston Red Sox	1	12	0.077	50	108
**Detroit Tigers**					
New York Yankees	5	8	0.385	66	99
Toronto Blue Jays	6	7	0.462	71	81
Total	14	38	0.269	255	393
AL Central
Chicago White Sox	3	10	0.231	70	125
Cleveland Indians	0	12	0.000	28	79
Kansas City Royals	6	6	0.500	47	47
Milwaukee Brewers	4	8	0.333	64	81
Minnesota Twins	6	6	0.500	68	92
Total	19	42	0.311	277	424
AL West
California Angels	6	6	0.500	75	55
Oakland Athletics	4	8	0.333	66	83
Seattle Mariners	6	6	0.500	73	83
Texas Rangers	4	9	0.308	37	65
Total	20	29	0.408	251	286
Season Total	53	109	0.327	783	1103

Month	Games	Won	Lost	Win %	RS	RA
April	27	9	18	0.333	152	211
May	27	4	23	0.148	84	194
June	27	10	17	0.370	146	187
July	26	12	14	0.462	146	168
August	29	14	15	0.483	137	159
September	26	4	22	0.154	118	184
Total	162	53	109	0.327	783	1103

	Games	Won	Lost	Win %	RS	RA
Home	81	27	54	0.333	391	539
Away	81	26	55	0.321	392	564
Total	162	53	109	0.327	783	1103

=== Notable transactions ===
- March 22, 1996: Melvin Nieves was traded by the San Diego Padres with Raul Casanova and Richie Lewis to the Detroit Tigers for Sean Bergman, Todd Steverson, and Cade Gaspar (minors).
- March 31, 1996: Curtis Pride was signed as a free agent with the Detroit Tigers.
- April 27, 1996: Joe Boever was selected off waivers by the Pittsburgh Pirates from the Detroit Tigers.
- July 31, 1996: Cecil Fielder was traded by the Detroit Tigers to the New York Yankees for Rubén Sierra and Matt Drews (minors).
- July 31, 1996: Chad Curtis was traded by the Detroit Tigers to the Los Angeles Dodgers for John Cummings and Joey Eischen.
- August 6, 1996: Todd Van Poppel was selected off waivers by the Detroit Tigers from the Oakland Athletics.

=== Roster ===
1996 Detroit Tigers
**Roster**
**Pitchers**: 49 Scott Aldred; 33 Mike Christopher; 34 John Cummings; 43 Joey Eischen; 52 John Farrell; 34 Greg Gohr; 57 Greg Keagle; 43,51 Richie Lewis; 32 José Lima; 40 Felipe Lira; 15 Brian Maxcy; 43 Jeff McCurry; 37 Trever Miller; 38 Brian Moehler; 27 Mike Myers; 48 C. J. Nitkowski; 28 Omar Olivares; 37 Gregg Olson; 49 A. J. Sager; 38 Bob Scanlan; 46 Clint Sodowsky; 22 Justin Thompson; 42 Tom Urbani; 59 Todd Van Poppel; 42,52 Randy Veres; 21 Mike Walker; 26 Brian Williams	**Catchers**: 7 Brad Ausmus; 33 Raul Casanova; 12 John Flaherty; 8 Mark Parent; **Infielders**: 15 Andújar Cedeño; 17 Tony Clark; 41 Fausto Cruz; 9 Damion Easley; 45 Cecil Fielder; 24 Travis Fryman; 35 Chris Gomez; 8 Phil Hiatt; 7 Tim Hyers; 14 Mark Lewis; 12 Phil Nevin; 3 Alan Trammell; 20 Eddie Williams	**Outfielders**: 39,12 Kimera Bartee; 29 Danny Bautista; 9 Chad Curtis; 4 Bobby Higginson; 30 Melvin Nieves; 42 Shannon Penn; 36 Curtis Pride; 21 Rubén Sierra; 15 Duane Singleton	**Manager**: 25 Buddy Bell; **Coaches**: -- Rick Adair (Pitching); 10 Glenn Ezell (Bench); 55 Terry Francona (Third Base); 31 Larry Herndon (Hitting); 18 Fred Kendall (Bullpen); 54 Jon Matlack (Pitching); 16 Ron Oester (First Base)

== Player stats ==
= Indicates team leader

=== Batting ===
==== Starters by position ====
Note: Pos = Position; G = Games played; AB = At bats; H = Hits; Avg. = Batting average; HR = Home runs; RBI = Runs batted in

Pos	Player	G	AB	H	Avg.	HR	RBI
C	Brad Ausmus	75	226	56	.248	4	22
1B	Tony Clark	100	376	94	.250	27	72
2B	Mark Lewis	145	545	147	.270	11	55
3B	Travis Fryman	157	616	165	.268	22	100
SS	Andújar Cedeño	52	179	35	.196	7	20
LF	Bobby Higginson	130	440	141	.320	26	81
CF	Chad Curtis	104	400	105	.263	10	37
RF	Melvin Nieves	110	431	106	.246	24	60
DH	Eddie Williams	77	215	43	.200	6	26

==== Other batters ====
Note: G = Games played; AB = At bats; H = Hits; Avg. = Batting average; HR = Home runs; RBI = Runs batted in

Player	G	AB	H	Avg.	HR	RBI
Cecil Fielder	107	391	97	.248	26	80
Curtis Pride	95	267	80	.300	10	31
Kimera Bartee	110	217	55	.253	1	14
Alan Trammell	66	193	45	.233	1	16
Rubén Sierra	46	158	35	.222	1	20
John Flaherty	47	152	38	.250	4	23
Chris Gomez	48	128	31	.242	1	16
Phil Nevin	38	120	35	.292	8	19
Mark Parent	38	104	25	.240	7	17
Raúl Casanova	25	85	16	.188	4	9
Damion Easley	21	67	23	.343	2	10
Danny Bautista	25	64	16	.250	2	8
Duane Singleton	18	56	9	.161	0	3
Fausto Cruz	14	38	9	.237	0	0
Tim Hyers	17	26	2	.077	0	0
Phil Hiatt	7	21	4	.190	0	1
Shannon Penn	6	14	1	.071	0	1

=== Pitching ===
==== Starting pitchers ====
Note: G = Games pitched; IP = Innings pitched; W = Wins; L = Losses; ERA = Earned run average; SO = Strikeouts

Player	G	IP	W	L	ERA	SO
Felipe Lira	32	194.2	6	14	5.22	113
Omar Olivares	25	160.0	7	11	4.89	81
Greg Gohr	17	91.2	4	8	7.17	60
Justin Thompson	11	59.0	1	6	4.58	44
C.J. Nitkowski	11	45.2	2	3	8.08	36
Scott Aldred	11	43.1	0	4	9.35	36
Todd Van Poppel	9	36.1	2	4	11.39	16
Clint Sodowsky	7	24.1	1	3	11.84	9
Trever Miller	5	16.2	0	4	9.18	8
Brian Moehler	2	10.1	0	1	4.35	2
John Farrell	2	6.1	0	2	14.21	0

==== Other pitchers ====
Note: G = Games pitched; IP = Innings pitched; W = Wins; L = Losses; ERA = Earned run average; SO = Strikeouts

Player	G	IP	W	L	ERA	SO
Brian Williams	40	121.0	3	10	6.77	72
Greg Keagle	26	87.2	3	6	7.39	70
A. J. Sager	22	79.0	4	5	5.01	52

==== Relief pitchers ====
Note: G = Games pitched; W = Wins; L = Losses; SV = Saves; ERA = Earned run average; SO = Strikeouts

Player	G	W	L	SV	ERA	SO
Gregg Olson	43	3	0	8	5.02	29
Mike Myers	83	1	5	6	5.01	69
Richie Lewis	72	4	6	2	4.18	78
José Lima	39	5	6	3	5.70	59
Randy Veres	25	0	4	0	8.31	28
Joey Eischen	24	1	1	0	3.24	15
John Cummings	21	3	3	0	5.12	24
Mike Walker	20	0	0	1	8.46	13
Tom Urbani	16	2	2	0	8.37	20
Mike Christopher	13	1	1	0	9.30	19
Bob Scanlan	8	0	0	0	10.64	3
Brian Maxcy	2	0	0	0	13.50	1
Jeff McCurry	2	0	0	0	24.30	0

== League leaders and award winners ==
- Kimera Bartee: #5 in AL times caught stealing (10)
- Chad Curtis: #5 in AL times caught stealing (10)
- Cecil Fielder: MLB leader in salary ($9,237,500)
- Travis Fryman: AL leader in fielding percentage at third base (.979)
- Travis Fryman: #3 in AL in sacrifice flies (10)
- Travis Fryman: #4 in AL in outs (483)
- Richie Lewis: #2 in AL in wild pitches (14)
- Felipe Lira: #4 in AL in shutouts (2)
- Mike Myers: AL leader in games (83)
- Melvin Nieves: #2 in AL in strikeouts (158)

== Worst seasons in Detroit Tigers history ==
Worst Seasons in Detroit Tigers History
Rank	Year	Wins	Losses	Win %
1	2003	43	119	.265
2	2019	47	114	.292
3	1952	50	104	.325
4	1996	53	109	.327
5	2002	55	106	.342

== Farm system ==
Level	Team	League	Manager
AAA	Toledo Mud Hens	International League	Tom Runnells
AA	Jacksonville Suns	Southern League	Bill Plummer and Larry Parrish
A	Visalia Oaks	California League	Tim Torricelli
A	Lakeland Tigers	Florida State League	Dave Anderson
A	Fayetteville Generals	South Atlantic League	Dwight Lowry
A-Short Season	Jamestown Jammers	New York–Penn League	Bruce Fields
Rookie	GCL Tigers	Gulf Coast League	Kevin Bradshaw

LEAGUE CHAMPIONS: Jacksonville
Visalia affiliation shared with Arizona Diamondbacks

== See also ==
- List of worst MLB season records
- 1996 in baseball
