= Jimmy Myers (baseball) =

American baseball player (born 1969)

- Pitcher
- Born: April 28, 1969 (age 57); Oklahoma City, Oklahoma, U.S.
- Batted: Right Threw: Right

MLB debut
- April 6, 1996, for the Baltimore Orioles

Last MLB appearance
- May 5, 1996, for the Baltimore Orioles

MLB statistics
- Win–loss record: 0–0
- Earned run average: 7.07
- Strikeouts: 6

CPBL statistics
- Win–loss record: 3–5
- Earned run average: 4.27
- Strikeouts: 41
- Stats at Baseball Reference

Teams
- Baltimore Orioles (1996); Sinon Bulls (1998–1999)

James Xavier Myers (born April 28, 1969) is an American former relief pitcher in Major League Baseball who played for the Baltimore Orioles in their 1996 season. Listed at 6' 1", 190 lb., Myers batted and threw right-handed. He was born in Oklahoma City, Oklahoma.
