= Marshall Boze =

American baseball player (born 1971)

- Pitcher
- Born: May 23, 1971 (age 54); San Manuel, Arizona, U.S.
- Batted: Right Threw: Right

MLB debut
- April 28, 1996, for the Milwaukee Brewers

Last MLB appearance
- July 13, 1996, for the Milwaukee Brewers

MLB statistics
- Win–loss record: 0–2
- Earned run average: 7.79
- Strikeouts: 19

CPBL statistics
- Win–loss record: 4-3
- Earned run average: 1.94
- Strikeouts: 44
- Stats at Baseball Reference

Teams
- Milwaukee Brewers (1996); Sinon Bulls (1998)

Marshall Wayne Boze (born May 23, 1971) is an American former Major League Baseball pitcher who played for one season. He played for the Milwaukee Brewers for 25 games during the 1996 Milwaukee Brewers season.

Boze grew up on the Kenai Peninsula and attended Soldotna High School in Soldotna, Alaska where he played several sports. In 1989, he went to Southwestern College in Chula Vista, California.
