= Bobby Higginson =

American baseball player (born 1970)

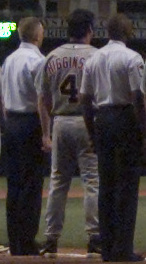
- Higginson (center) in 2002
- Outfielder
- Born: August 18, 1970 (age 55); Philadelphia, Pennsylvania, U.S.
- Batted: Left Threw: Right

MLB debut
- April 26, 1995, for the Detroit Tigers

Last MLB appearance
- May 5, 2005, for the Detroit Tigers

MLB statistics
- Batting average: .272
- Home runs: 187
- Runs batted in: 709
- Stats at Baseball Reference

Teams
- Detroit Tigers (1995–2005)

Robert Leigh Higginson (born August 18, 1970) is an American former professional baseball outfielder who played his entire career for the Detroit Tigers of Major League Baseball (MLB).

== Amateur career ==
Born in Philadelphia, Pennsylvania, Higginson attended Frankford High School and played college baseball at Temple University. In 1991, he played collegiate summer baseball with the Bourne Braves of the Cape Cod Baseball League. He was selected by the Philadelphia Phillies in the 18th round of the 1991 MLB draft, but opted not to sign. The following year he was drafted by the Tigers in the 12th round of the 1992 MLB draft.

== Professional career ==
Higginson made his major league debut in 1995, and played 130 games for the Tigers. He batted .320 in 1996 and .300 in 2000, scored over 100 runs in 2000 and drove in over 100 runs in 1997 and 2000. His career high of 30 home-runs came also in 2000. He twice led the Majors in outfield assists, and also led all American League left fielders in putouts in 2000 (305) and 2001 (321), although he never won a Gold Glove for his fielding. He was never named to an All-Star team.

On June 30 and July 1, 1997, Higginson tied a major league record by hitting four home runs in four consecutive at-bats — three on the first day, and then another in the first inning of the second day.

Higginson was named "Tiger of the Year" by the Detroit chapter of the BBWAA in 1997 and 2000. Since the award's inception in 1965, eleven players have been named "Tiger of the Year" on multiple occasions: Higginson, Justin Verlander, Miguel Cabrera, Travis Fryman, Cecil Fielder, Alan Trammell, Lou Whitaker, Kirk Gibson, Ron LeFlore, Jeimer Candelario and Denny McLain.

An elbow injury limited Higginson to 10 games in 2005, which turned out to be his final season. He was granted free agency on October 31, but retired instead, at the age of 35. In his eleven seasons in Detroit, Higginson never played on a team with a winning record. (The Tigers would reach the 2006 World Series, the season after Higginson's retirement.) He finished among the Tigers' all-time top 20 in almost every offensive category, including games played (1,362), at-bats (4,910), hits (1,336), runs (736), doubles (270), home runs (187), RBI (709) and stolen bases (91).

Higginson is known for breaking up a no-hitter in the ninth inning and two out during a game in Toronto on September 27, 1998, with a pinch-hit home run. The pitcher, future Hall of Famer Roy Halladay, was making his second-ever MLB appearance, and ended up winning his first career game, 2–1.

== See also ==
- List of Major League Baseball players who spent their entire career with one franchise
