= Roger Pavlik =

American baseball player (born 1967)

- Pitcher
- Born: October 4, 1967 (age 58); Houston, Texas, U.S.
- Batted: Right Threw: Right

MLB debut
- May 2, 1992, for the Texas Rangers

Last MLB appearance
- April 23, 1998, for the Texas Rangers

MLB statistics
- Win–loss record: 47–39
- Earned run average: 4.58
- Strikeouts: 526
- Stats at Baseball Reference

Teams
- Texas Rangers (1992–1998)

Career highlights and awards
- All-Star (1996)

Roger Allen Pavlik (born October 4, 1967) is an American former Major League Baseball pitcher who played for the Texas Rangers from 1992 to 1998. Pavlik was drafted by the Texas Rangers in the second round of the 1986 draft out of Aldine High School in Houston. Pavlik's career record was 47-39 with a 4.58 ERA. His mechanics were unusual and his jerky windup and release caused undue injuries over the course of his career. He retired in early 2000 at the Colorado Rockies' training camp in Tucson, Arizona. No explanation was given for Pavlik's retirement, although he faced rehabilitation from rotator cuff surgery, which caused him to miss the 1999 season.

Pavlik was elected to the American League All-Star team in 1996, when he was a 15-game winner, despite having an ERA over 5.00.
