= Brian Sackinsky =

American baseball player (born 1971)

- Pitcher
- Born: June 22, 1971 (age 55); Pittsburgh, Pennsylvania, U.S.
- Batted: Right Threw: Right

MLB debut
- April 20, 1996, for the Baltimore Orioles

Last MLB appearance
- April 24, 1996, for the Baltimore Orioles

MLB statistics
- Win–loss record: 0–0
- Earned run average: 3.86
- Strikeouts: 2
- Stats at Baseball Reference

Teams
- Baltimore Orioles (1996)
Medals
Men's baseball
Representing United States
World Junior Baseball Championship
Gold medal – first place	1989 Trois-Rivières	Team

Brian Walter Sackinsky (born June 22, 1971) is an American former baseball player who pitched in three games for the Baltimore Orioles in Major League Baseball in April 1996. Sackinsky pitched collegiately for the Stanford Cardinal, pitching in the 1990 College World Series.

== International career ==
Sackinsky played for the United States national under-18 baseball team that went undefeated en route to a gold medal at the 1989 World Junior Baseball Championship in Trois-Rivières, Quebec.

== Amateur career ==
Sackinsky played baseball at South Park High School in South Park, Pennsylvania. After high school, he played college baseball at Stanford. As a freshman, he pitched a complete game to win an elimination game against Georgia in the 1990 College World Series. Georgia had beaten them 16–2 in their previous game. Sackinsky was described by William C. Rhoden in The New York Times as "[p]erhaps the greatest surprise for Stanford" that season along with Jeffrey Hammonds.

== Professional career ==
The Baltimore Orioles selected Sackinsky in the second round of the 1992 Major League Baseball draft, one round after selecting Hammonds, his college teammate. Sackinsky was assigned to the Frederick Keys to begin his professional career but was demoted to the rookie-level Bluefield Orioles by August. In fall 1994, he played with Michael Jordan for the Scottsdale Scorpions in the Arizona Fall League. During the 1994–95 Major League Baseball strike, Sackinsky worked out with his former college baseball team before returning to stay at his parents' home in Library, Pennsylvania, where he worked out with his former high school team. When the 1995 season began, Sackinsky took the mound for the Rochester Red Wings as the first pitcher in the history of Frontier Field. He missed nearly a month in the first half of the 1995 season due to elbow inflammation before undergoing surgery that summer.

Early in the 1996 season, he was called up to the majors for the only time in his career to replace an injured Armando Benítez. He made his major league debut on April 20 and pitched four innings in relief of Jimmy Haynes, allowing one earned run. Sackinsky appeared in two more games between his debut and his final Major League game on April 24. On April 25, the Orioles demoted Sackinsky to Triple-A Rochester to make room on the roster for Keith Shepherd.

Following the 1996 season, Orioles general manager Pat Gillick told The Baltimore Sun that Sackinsky told the Orioles organization that he would retire instead of undergoing reconstructive surgery on his elbow. However, only two days later, his agent told the press that he had decided not to retire after getting a second opinion from the Pittsburgh Pirates team doctor.

Sackinsky pitched two more years in Baltimore's farm system. His last professional season came in 1998.

== Personal life ==
In March 1995, Sackinsky was engaged to a Stanford student. He married later in 1995.

In July 2016, Sackinsky was working for Nike.
