= Brent Bowers =

American baseball player (born 1971)

- Left fielder
- Born: May 2, 1971 (age 55); Bridgeview, Illinois, U.S.
- Batted: Left Threw: Right

MLB debut
- August 16, 1996, for the Baltimore Orioles

Last MLB appearance
- September 29, 1996, for the Baltimore Orioles

MLB statistics
- Batting average: .308
- Home runs: 0
- Runs batted in: 3

KBO statistics
- Batting average: .290
- Home runs: 3
- Runs batted in: 12
- Stats at Baseball Reference

Teams
- Baltimore Orioles (1996); Hyundai Unicorns (1999)

Brent Raymond Bowers (born May 2, 1971) is an American former professional baseball player. Bowers played in Major League Baseball as an outfielder for the Baltimore Orioles in the 1996 season. He also played for the Hyundai Unicorns in the Korea Baseball Organization in 1999. He batted left-handed and threw right-handed.

== Career ==
Bowers graduated from St. Laurence High School in Burbank, Illinois in 1989. He was drafted by the Toronto Blue Jays in the second round of the 1989 Draft. In his lone major league season, in 21 games, he had 12 hits, six runs scored, in 39 at-bats, playing left field. He continued to play minor league baseball until 2002.

He served as the hitting coach for the Gary SouthShore RailCats of the Northern League from 2003 to 2004. He was the manager of the Windy City ThunderBolts of the Frontier League in 2005 and 2006. Bowers was the manager for the Edmonton Capitals of the Golden Baseball League beginning in 2008. He was suspended for the remainder of the season as a result of homophobic remarks made during a game on July 31, 2010. On August 7, 2010 he resigned from his position with Edmonton.

Bowers runs Triple Crown All-Stars, a baseball and softball academy in Schererville, Indiana.

== Personal life ==
Bowers and his wife Shayla were married in 2011.
