= Todd Dunn =

American baseball player (born 1970)

- Outfielder
- Born: July 29, 1970 (age 56); Tulsa, Oklahoma, U.S.
- Batted: Right Threw: Right

MLB debut
- September 8, 1996, for the Milwaukee Brewers

Last MLB appearance
- September 25, 1997, for the Milwaukee Brewers

MLB statistics
- Batting average: .234
- Home runs: 3
- Runs batted in: 10
- Stats at Baseball Reference

Teams
- Milwaukee Brewers (1996–1997)

Todd Kent Dunn (born July 29, 1970) is an American former professional baseball outfielder. He played in Major League Baseball (MLB) for the Milwaukee Brewers from 1996 to 1997.

== Career ==
=== Milwaukee Brewers ===
Dunn played for the Milwaukee Brewers in the 1996 and 1997 seasons. In 50 career games, Dunn had 30 hits, three home runs, six doubles, and a .234 batting average. He batted and threw right-handed. Dunn spent the 1998 season in the minor leagues with the High-A Stockton Ports, Double-A El Paso Diablos, and Triple-A Louisville Redbirds, batting .314/.375/.548 with 14 home runs, 58 RBI, and seven stolen bases across 88 total appearances.

Dunn began the 1999 season in Triple-A with the Louisville RiverBats, he batted .217/.320/.387 with five home runs, 16 RBI, and two stolen bases.

=== Baltimore Orioles ===
On June 1, 1999, Dunn was traded to the Baltimore Orioles in exchange for Lyle Moulton. In 30 appearances for the Triple-A Rochester Red Wings, Dunn slashed .173/.248/.286 with two home runs, 15 RBI, and one stolen base.

=== Pittsburgh Pirates ===
Dunn spent the latter part of the 1999 in the Pittsburgh Pirates organization. In eight appearances for the Double-A Altoona Curve, he went 5-for-30 (.167) with two RBI.

=== New York Mets ===
Dunn spent the 2000 season in the New York Mets organization with the Triple-A Norfolk Tides, hitting .215/.278/.395 with seven home runs, 19 RBI, and four stolen bases over 62 appearances.
