= 1996 Boston Red Sox season =

Major League Baseball season

1996 Boston Red Sox
- League: American League
- Division: East
- Ballpark: Fenway Park
- City: Boston
- Record: 85–77 (.525)
- Divisional place: 3rd
- Owners: JRY Trust
- President: John Harrington
- General manager: Dan Duquette
- Manager: Kevin Kennedy
- Television: WABU (Sean McDonough, Jerry Remy); NESN (Bob Kurtz, Jerry Remy)
- Radio: WEEI (Jerry Trupiano, Joe Castiglione); WROL (Bobby Serrano, Hector Martinez)
- Stats: ESPN.com; Baseball Reference

The 1996 Boston Red Sox season was the 96th season in the franchise's Major League Baseball history. The Red Sox finished third in the American League East with a record of 85–77, seven games behind the New York Yankees, who went on to win the 1996 World Series.

== Offseason ==
- October 13, 1995: Butch Henry was selected off waivers by the Red Sox from the Montreal Expos.
- December 14, 1995: Mike Stanley was signed as a free agent by the Red Sox.
- December 21, 1995: Milt Cuyler was signed as a free agent by the Red Sox.
- December 21, 1995: Tom Gordon was signed as a free agent by the Red Sox.
- January 2, 1996: Jamie Moyer was signed as a free agent by the Red Sox.
- January 10, 1996: Traded Rhéal Cormier, Ryan McGuire, and Shayne Bennett to the Montreal Expos for Wil Cordero and Bryan Eversgerd.
- January 21, 1996: Dan Monzon, supervisor of Latin American scouting, was killed in an automobile accident in the Dominican Republic.
- January 22, 1996: Alex Cole was signed as a free agent by the Red Sox.
- January 29, 1996: Glenn Murray, Ken Ryan, and Lee Tinsley were traded by the Red Sox to the Philadelphia Phillies for Heathcliff Slocumb, Larry Wimberly (minors) and Rick Holyfield (minors).
- March 8, 1996: Kevin Mitchell was signed as a free agent by the Red Sox.
- March 19, 1996: Luis Alicea was selected off waivers by the St. Louis Cardinals.

== Regular season ==
- September 18, 1996: Roger Clemens struck out 20 batters for the second time in his career, becoming the only player ever to do so. The performance came against the Detroit Tigers at Tiger Stadium. Clemens' second 20-K day occurred in his second-to-last game as a member of the Boston Red Sox.

=== Season standings ===
AL East
Team	W	L	Pct.	GB	Home	Road
New York Yankees	92	70	.568	—	49‍–‍31	43‍–‍39
Baltimore Orioles	88	74	.543	4	43‍–‍38	45‍–‍36
Boston Red Sox	85	77	.525	7	47‍–‍34	38‍–‍43
Toronto Blue Jays	74	88	.457	18	35‍–‍46	39‍–‍42
Detroit Tigers	53	109	.327	39	27‍–‍54	26‍–‍55

=== Record vs. opponents ===
1996 American League record Source: MLB Standings Grid – 1996
Team	BAL	BOS	CAL	CWS	CLE	DET	KC	MIL	MIN	NYY	OAK	SEA	TEX	TOR
Baltimore	—	7–6	6–6	4–8	5–7	11–2	9–3	9–3	7–5	3–10	9–4	7–5	3–10–1	8–5
Boston	6–7	—	8–4	6–6	1–11	12–1	3–9	7–5	6–6	7–6	8–5	7–6	6–6	8–5
California	6–6	4–8	—	6–6	4–9	6–6	4–8	7–5	4–8	7–6	6–7	5–8	4–9	7–5
Chicago	8–4	6–6	6–6	—	5–8	10–3	7–6	6–7	6–7	6–7	5–7	5–7	8–4	7–5
Cleveland	7–5	11–1	9–4	8–5	—	12–0	7–6	7–6	10–3	3–9	6–6	8–4	4–8	7–5
Detroit	2–11	1–12	6–6	3–10	0–12	—	6–6	4–8	6–6	5–8	4–8	6–6	4–9	6–7
Kansas City	3–9	9–3	8–4	6–7	6–7	6–6	—	4–9	6–7	4–8	5–7	7–5	6–6	5–8
Milwaukee	3–9	5–7	5–7	7–6	6–7	8–4	9–4	—	9–4	6–6	7–5	4–9	6–7	5–7
Minnesota	5–7	6–6	8–4	7–6	3–10	6–6	7–6	4–9	—	5–7	6–7	6–6	7–5	8–5
New York	10–3	6–7	6–7	7–6	9–3	8–5	8–4	6–6	7–5	—	9–3	3–9	5–7	8–5
Oakland	4–9	5–8	7–6	7–5	6–6	8–4	7–5	5–7	7–6	3–9	—	8–5	7–6	4–8
Seattle	5–7	6–7	8–5	7–5	4–8	6–6	5–7	9–4	6–6	9–3	5–8	—	10–3	5–7
Texas	10–3–1	6–6	9–4	4–8	8–4	9–4	6–6	7–6	5–7	7–5	6–7	3–10	—	10–2
Toronto	5–8	5–8	5–7	5–7	5–7	7–6	8–5	7–5	5–8	5–8	8–4	7–5	2–10	—

=== Detailed records ===
American League
Opponent	W	L	WP	RS	RA
AL East
Baltimore Orioles	6	7	0.462	78	71
Boston Red Sox					
Detroit Tigers	12	1	0.923	108	50
New York Yankees	7	6	0.538	72	73
Toronto Blue Jays	8	5	0.615	77	72
Total	33	19	0.635	335	266
AL Central
Chicago White Sox	6	6	0.500	71	70
Cleveland Indians	1	11	0.083	42	87
Kansas City Royals	3	9	0.250	48	69
Milwaukee Brewers	7	5	0.583	58	68
Minnesota Twins	6	6	0.500	78	76
Total	23	37	0.383	297	370
AL West
California Angels	8	4	0.667	69	52
Oakland Athletics	8	5	0.615	76	57
Seattle Mariners	7	6	0.538	88	81
Texas Rangers	6	6	0.500	63	95
Total	29	21	0.580	296	285
Season Total	85	77	0.525	928	921

Month	Games	Won	Lost	Win %	RS	RA
April	26	7	19	0.269	120	166
May	26	14	12	0.538	177	155
June	27	13	14	0.481	152	174
July	26	13	13	0.500	163	148
August	31	22	9	0.710	156	136
September	26	16	10	0.615	160	142
Total	162	85	77	0.525	928	921

	Games	Won	Lost	Win %	RS	RA
Home	81	47	34	0.580	517	464
Away	81	38	43	0.469	411	457
Total	162	85	77	0.525	928	921

=== Notable transactions ===
- April 18, 1996: Bryan Eversgerd was traded by Red Sox to the Texas Rangers for a player to be named later. The Rangers completed the deal by sending Rudy Pemberton on April 24.
- May 17, 1996: Brad Pennington was selected off of waivers from the California Angels.
- June 5, 1996: Jeff Frye was signed as a free agent.
- June 9, 1996: Traded Scott Backum to the Philadelphia Phillies for Lee Tinsley.
- July 30, 1996: Kevin Mitchell was traded by the Red Sox to the Cincinnati Reds for Roberto Mejía and Brad Tweedie (minors).
- July 30, 1996: Jamie Moyer was traded by the Red Sox to the Seattle Mariners for Darren Bragg.
- July 31, 1996: Mike Stanton and a player to be named later were traded by the Red Sox to the Texas Rangers for Mark Brandenburg and Kerry Lacy. The Red Sox completed the deal by sending Dwayne Hosey to the Rangers on November 4.
- August 1, 1996: Greg Pirkl was selected off waivers by the Red Sox from the Seattle Mariners.
- August 26, 1996: Traded for a player to be named later to the Minnesota Twins for Pat Mahomes. Brian Looney was sent to the Twins on December 17 to complete the deal.

==== Draft picks ====
- June 4, 1996: 1996 Major League Baseball draft
  - Chris Reitsma was drafted by the Red Sox in the 1st round. Player signed June 22, 1996.
  - Dernell Stenson was drafted by the Red Sox in the 2nd round. Player signed July 12, 1996.
  - Robert Ramsay was drafted by the Red Sox in the 7th round. Player signed June 15, 1996.
  - Justin Duchscherer was drafted by the Red Sox in the 8th round. Player signed June 14, 1996.
  - Shea Hillenbrand was drafted by the Red Sox in the 10th round. Player signed June 6, 1996.
  - Aaron Harang was drafted by the Red Sox in the 22nd round, but did not sign.

=== Opening Day lineup ===
12	Wil Cordero	2B
13	John Valentin	SS
42	Mo Vaughn	1B
33	José Canseco	DH
22	Mike Stanley	C
39	Mike Greenwell	LF
11	Tim Naehring	3B
25	Troy O'Leary	RF
46	Dwayne Hosey	CF
21	Roger Clemens	P

=== Roster ===
1996 Boston Red Sox
Roster
Pitchers: 43 Stan Belinda; 50 Mark Brandenburg; 21 Roger Clemens; 45 John Doherty; 52 Vaughn Eshelman; 34 Rich Garcés; 36 Tom Gordon; 57 Ken Grundt; 28 Eric Gunderson; 23 Reggie Harris; 54 Joe Hudson; 59 Brent Knackert; 53 Kerry Lacy; 19 Mike Maddux; 59 Pat Mahomes; 58 Nate Minchey; 50 Jamie Moyer; 31 Brad Pennington; 26 Aaron Sele; 51 Heathcliff Slocumb; 32 Mike Stanton; 55 Jeff Suppan; 49 Tim Wakefield	Catchers: 56 Alex Delgado; 37 Bill Haselman; 47 Scott Hatteberg; 45 Walt McKeel; 22 Mike Stanley; Infielders: 10 Esteban Beltré; 23 Phil Clark; 12 Wil Cordero; 3 Jeff Frye; 5 Nomar Garciaparra; 48 Jeff Manto; 11 Tim Naehring; 48 Arquimedez Pozo; 31 Tony Rodríguez; 29 Bill Selby; 48 Jim Tatum; 13 John Valentin; 42 Mo Vaughn	Outfielders: 56 Darren Bragg; 33 José Canseco; 2 Alex Cole; 15 Milt Cuyler; 39 Mike Greenwell; 46 Dwayne Hosey; 18 Reggie Jefferson; 38 José Malavé; 24 Kevin Mitchell; 7 Trot Nixon; 25 Troy O'Leary; 57 Rudy Pemberton; 10,47 Lee Tinsley; Other batters: 45 Greg Pirkl	Manager: 44 Kevin Kennedy; Coaches: 35 Dave Carlucci (Bullpen); 41 Sammy Ellis (Pitching); 17 Tim Johnson (Bench); 47 Al Nipper (Pitching); 16 Dave Oliver (Third base); 14 Jim Rice (Hitting); 40 Herm Starrette (Bullpen); 20 Frank White (First base)

== Player stats ==
=== Batting ===
==== Starters by position ====
Note: Pos = Position; G = Games played; AB = At bats; H = Hits; Avg. = Batting average; HR = Home runs; RBI = Runs batted in; SB = Stolen bases

Pos	Player	G	AB	H	Avg.	HR	RBI	SB
C	Mike Stanley	121	397	107	.270	24	69	2
1B	Mo Vaughn	161	635	207	.326	44	143	2
2B	Jeff Frye	105	419	120	.286	4	41	18
SS	John Valentin	131	606	156	.296	13	59	9
3B	Tim Naehring	116	430	124	.288	17	65	2
LF	Mike Greenwell	77	295	87	.295	7	44	4
CF	Lee Tinsley	92	192	47	.245	3	14	6
RF	Troy O'Leary	149	497	129	.260	15	81	3
DH	Jose Canseco	96	360	104	.289	28	82	3

==== Other batters ====
Note: G = Games played; AB = At bats; H = Hits; Avg. = Batting average; HR = Home runs; RBI = Runs batted in; SB = Stolen bases

Player	G	AB	H	Avg.	HR	RBI	SB
Reggie Jefferson	122	386	134	.347	19	74	0
Bill Haselman	77	237	65	.274	8	34	4
Darren Bragg	58	222	56	.252	3	22	6
Wil Cordero	59	198	57	.288	3	37	2
Milt Cuyler	50	110	22	.200	2	12	7
José Malavé	41	102	24	.235	4	17	0
Bill Selby	40	95	26	.274	3	6	1
Kevin Mitchell	27	93	28	.304	2	13	0
Nomar Garciaparra	24	87	21	.241	4	16	5
Dwayne Hosey	28	78	17	.218	1	3	6
Alex Cole	24	72	16	.222	0	7	5
Tony Rodríguez	27	67	16	.239	1	9	0
Esteban Beltré	27	62	16	.258	0	6	1
Arquimedez Pozo	21	58	10	.172	1	11	1
Jeff Manto	22	48	10	.208	2	6	0
Rudy Pemberton	13	41	21	.512	1	10	3
Alex Delgado	26	20	5	.250	0	1	0
Scott Hatteberg	10	11	2	.182	0	1	0
Jim Tatum	2	8	1	.125	0	0	0
Trot Nixon	2	4	2	.500	0	0	1
Phil Clark	3	3	0	.000	0	0	0
Greg Pirkl	2	2	0	.000	0	0	0
Walt McKeel	1	0	0	----	0	0	0

=== Pitching ===
Note: G = Games pitched; GS = Games started; IP = Innings pitched; W = Wins; L = Losses; SV = Saves; ERA = Earned run average; SO = Strikeouts

Player	G	GS	IP	W	L	SV	ERA	SO
Roger Clemens	34	34	242.2	10	13	0	3.63	257
Tom Gordon	34	34	215.2	12	9	0	5.59	171
Tim Wakefield	32	32	211.2	14	13	0	5.14	140
Aaron Sele	29	29	157.1	7	11	0	5.69	67
Jamie Moyer	23	10	90.0	7	1	0	4.50	50
Vaughn Eshelman	39	10	87.2	6	3	0	7.08	59
Heathcliff Slocumb	75	0	83.1	5	5	31	3.02	88
Mike Maddux	23	7	64.1	3	2	0	4.48	32
Mike Stanton	59	0	56.1	4	3	1	3.83	46
Joe Hudson	36	0	45.0	3	5	1	5.40	19
Rich Garcés	37	0	44.0	3	2	0	4.91	55
Stan Belinda	31	0	28.2	2	1	2	6.59	18
Mark Brandenburg	29	0	28.1	4	2	0	3.81	29
Jeff Suppan	8	4	22.2	1	1	0	7.54	13
Eric Gunderson	28	0	17.1	0	1	0	8.31	7
Brad Pennington	14	0	13.0	0	2	0	2.77	13
Pat Mahomes	11	0	12.1	2	0	2	5.84	6
Kerry Lacy	11	0	10.2	2	0	0	3.38	9
Brent Knackert	8	0	10.0	0	1	0	9.00	5
John Doherty	3	0	6.1	0	0	0	5.68	3
Nate Minchey	2	2	6.0	0	2	0	15.00	4
Reggie Harris	4	0	4.1	0	0	0	12.46	4
Ken Grundt	1	0	0.1	0	0	0	27.00	0

== Game log ==
Red Sox Win	Red Sox Loss	Game postponed

1996 Boston Red Sox Season Game Log: 85–77 (Home: 47–34; Away: 38–43)
April: 7–19

#	Date	Opponent	Score	Win	Loss	Save	Stadium	Attendance	Record	Streak
1	April 1	@ Rangers	3–5	Hill (1–0)	Clemens (0–1)	Vosberg (1)	The Ballpark in Arlington	40,484	0–1	L1
2	April 3	@ Rangers	2–7	Pavlik (1–0)	Gordon (0–1)	—	The Ballpark in Arlington	24,483	0–2	L2
3	April 4	@ Rangers	2–13	Gross (1–0)	Wakefield (0–1)	—	The Ballpark in Arlington	18,086	0–3	L3
4	April 5	@ Royals	4–5 (12)	Clark (1–0)	Pennington (0–1)	—	Kauffman Stadium	39,526	0–4	L4
5	April 6	@ Royals	3–7	Pichardo (1–1)	Belinda (0–1)	—	Kauffman Stadium	17,339	0–5	L5
6	April 7	@ Royals	3–1	Moyer (1–0)	Gubicza (0–1)	Slocumb (1)	Kauffman Stadium	13,183	1–5	W1
—	April 8	Twins	Postponed (snow). Makeup date April 9.							
7	April 9	Twins	9–1	Gordon (1–1)	Rodriguez (0–1)	—	Fenway Park	30,843	2–5	W2
—	April 10	Twins	Postponed (snow). Makeup date August 3.							
8	April 11	Twins	5–6	Radke (3–0)	Clemens (0–2)	Stevens (2)	Fenway Park	15,594	2–6	L1
9	April 12	Indians	1–3	Nagy (2–0)	Sele (0–1)	Mesa (2)	Fenway Park	26,703	2–7	L2
10	April 13	Indians	2–14	Martínez (2–1)	Moyer (1–1)	—	Fenway Park	31,827	2–8	L3
11	April 14	Indians	6–7 (11)	Tavárez (1–1)	Stanton (0–1)	Mesa (2)	Fenway Park	31,796	2–9	L4
12	April 15	Indians	0–8	McDowell (1–1)	Wakefield (0–2)	—	Fenway Park	32,861	2–10	L5
13	April 16	@ Orioles	1–6	Wells (2–0)	Clemens (0–3)	—	Camden Yards	40,017	2–11	L6
14	April 17	@ Orioles	5–6 (12)	Rhodes (2–0)	Maddux (0–1)	—	Camden Yards	40,258	2–12	L7
15	April 18	@ Orioles	10–7	Moyer (2–1)	Mussina (3–1)	Slocumb (2)	Camden Yards	47,283	3–12	W1
16	April 19	@ Indians	4–9	Martínez (3–1)	Gordon (1–2)	—	Jacobs Field	40,521	3–13	L1
17	April 20	@ Indians	1–2	McDowell (2–1)	Wakefield (0–3)	Mesa (4)	Jacobs Field	40,498	3–14	L2
18	April 21	@ Indians	7–11	Ogea (1–0)	Pennington (0–2)	—	Jacobs Field	42,256	3–15	L3
19	April 22	@ Twins	4–1	Sele (1–1)	Robertson (0–4)	Slocumb (3)	Metrodome	11,340	4–15	W1
20	April 23	@ Twins	6–8	Naulty (1–0)	Hudson (0–1)	Stevens (5)	Metrodome	11,533	4–16	L1
21	April 24	Rangers	11–9	Stanton (1–1)	Heredia (0–2)	Slocumb (4)	Fenway Park	19,217	5–16	W1
22	April 25	Rangers	8–3	Wakefield (1–3)	Gross (3–2)	—	Fenway Park	20,350	6–16	W2
23	April 26	Royals	3–4	Belcher (2–1)	Clemens (0–4)	Montgomery (5)	Fenway Park	22,385	6–17	L1
24	April 27	Royals	0–10	Appier (2–3)	Sele (1–2)	—	Fenway Park	29,459	6–18	L2
25	April 28	Royals	7–9	Robinson (1–0)	Slocumb (0–1)	Montgomery (6)	Fenway Park	32,491	7–18	W1
26	April 30	Tigers	13–4	Wakefield (2–3)	Lima (0–1)	—	Fenway Park	18,504	7–19	L1

May: 14–12

#	Date	Opponent	Score	Win	Loss	Save	Stadium	Attendance	Record	Streak
27	May 1	Tigers	5–1	Clemens (1–4)	Aldred (0–3)	—	Fenway Park	20,828	8–19	W2
28	May 3	Blue Jays	8–7	Moyer (3–1)	Quantrill (0–4)	Slocumb (5)	Fenway Park	25,570	9–19	W3
29	May 4	Blue Jays	8–4	Gordon (2–2)	Viola (0–2)	Slocumb (6)	Fenway Park	29,785	10–19	W4
30	May 5	Blue Jays	4–11	Hentgen (4–2)	Wakefield (2–4)	—	Fenway Park	29,866	10–20	L1
31	May 7	@ Brewers	4–2	Clemens (2–4)	Miranda (1–2)	Slocumb (7)	Milwaukee County Stadium	7,039	11–20	W1
—	May 8	@ Brewers	Postponed (rain). Makeup date August 9.							
32	May 9	@ Brewers	2–17	Bones (2–5)	Sele (1–3)	—	Milwaukee County Stadium	7,379	11–21	L1
33	May 10	@ Blue Jays	6–5 (11)	Slocumb (1–1)	Carrara (0–1)	—	SkyDome	31,159	12–21	W1
34	May 11	@ Blue Jays	8–9 (11)	Quantrill (2–4)	Knackert (0–1)	—	SkyDome	33,163	12–22	L1
35	May 12	@ Blue Jays	7–8 (10)	Janzen (1–0)	Slocumb (1–2)	—	SkyDome	31,188	12–23	L2
36	May 14	Angels	4–3 (12)	Belinda (1–1)	Boskie (4–1)	—	Fenway Park	22,450	13–23	W1
37	May 15	Angels	17–6	Moyer (4–1)	Grimsley (2–3)	—	Fenway Park	23,455	14–23	W2
38	May 17	Athletics	5–3 (11)	Stanton (2–1)	Van Poppel (0–4)	—	Fenway Park	28,690	15–23	W3
39	May 18	Athletics	5–6 (10)	Groom (2–0)	Garcés (0–1)	Taylor (3)	Fenway Park	31,663	15–24	L1
40	May 19	Athletics	12–2	Sele (2–3)	Wengert (1–2)	—	Fenway Park	32,601	16–24	W1
41	May 20	Athletics	16–4	Gordon (3–2)	Johns (3–5)	—	Fenway Park	20,890	17–24	W2
42	May 21	Mariners	7–13	Wells (3–1)	Eshelman (0–1)	—	Fenway Park	24,528	17–25	L1
43	May 22	Mariners	1–6	Wolcott (3–5)	Wakefield (2–5)	—	Fenway Park	26,753	17–26	L2
44	May 23	Mariners	11–4	Clemens (3–4)	Milacki (1–1)	—	Fenway Park	31,551	18–26	W1
45	May 24	@ Angels	1–3	Finley (6–2)	Sele (2–4)	Percival (13)	Anaheim Stadium	19,550	18–27	L1
46	May 25	@ Angels	10–3	Gordon (4–2)	Williams (0–2)	—	Anaheim Stadium	23,972	19–27	W1
47	May 26	@ Angels	2–12	Boskie (6–1)	Eshelman (0–2)	—	Anaheim Stadium	23,828	19–28	L1
48	May 27	@ Athletics	10–3	Wakefield (3–5)	Wojciechowski (5–1)	—	Oakland-Alameda County Coliseum	21,688	20–28	W1
49	May 28	@ Athletics	2–6	Wasdin (1–0)	Clemens (3–5)	—	Oakland-Alameda County Coliseum	9,338	20–29	L1
50	May 29	@ Athletics	6–7 (10)	Mohler (3–0)	Slocumb (1–3)	—	Oakland-Alameda County Coliseum	8,282	20–30	L2
51	May 30	@ Mariners	10–1	Gordon (5–2)	Torres (0–1)	—	Kingdome	17,395	21–30	W1
52	May 31	@ Mariners	6–9	Wells (4–1)	Garcés (0–2)	—	Kingdome	29,119	21–31	L1

June: 13–14

#	Date	Opponent	Score	Win	Loss	Save	Stadium	Attendance	Record	Streak
53	June 1	@ Mariners	6–5	Wakefield (4–5)	Milacki (1–2)	Slocumb (8)	Kingdome	34,822	22–31	W1
54	June 2	@ Mariners	1–2	Wolcott (4–5)	Clemens (3–6)	Jackson (2)	Kingdome	47,540	22–32	L1
55	June 4	White Sox	4–6	Álvarez (7–3)	Gunderson (0–1)	Hernández (17)	Fenway Park	23,715	22–33	L2
56	June 5	White Sox	6–8 (12)	Keyser (1–0)	Slocumb (1–4)	—	Fenway Park	24,246	22–34	L3
57	June 6	White Sox	7–4	Eshelman (1–2)	Magrane (1–2)	Stanton (1)	Fenway Park	24,382	23–34	W1
58	June 7	Brewers	10–7	Garcés (1–2)	García (1–2)	Slocumb (9)	Fenway Park	26,861	24–34	W2
59	June 8	Brewers	2–3 (10)	Lloyd (2–2)	Hudson (0–2)	Fetters (10)	Fenway Park	30,399	24–35	L1
60	June 9	Brewers	6–9 (10)	Burrows (1–0)	Slocumb (1–5)	Fetters (11)	Fenway Park	28,120	24–36	L2
61	June 10	@ White Sox	2–8	Tapani (7–3)	Wakefield (4–6)	—	Comiskey Park	21,799	24–37	L3
62	June 11	@ White Sox	9–2	Eshelman (2–2)	Magrane (1–3)	—	Comiskey Park	20,792	25–37	W1
63	June 12	@ White Sox	3–2 (12)	Hudson (1–2)	Karchner (5–1)	—	Comiskey Park	21,139	26–37	W2
64	June 13	Rangers	8–7 (10)	Slocumb (2–5)	Henneman (0–4)	—	Fenway Park	32,645	27–37	W3
65	June 14	Rangers	4–3	Stanton (3–1)	Witt (6–5)	—	Fenway Park	29,689	28–37	W4
66	June 15	Rangers	3–13	Gross (7–4)	Wakefield (4–7)	—	Fenway Park	33,186	28–38	L1
67	June 16	Rangers	10–9	Hudson (2–2)	Henneman (0–5)	—	Fenway Park	30,461	29–38	W1
68	June 18	@ Indians	7–9	Swindell (1–3)	Sele (2–5)	Mesa (23)	Jacobs Field	42,209	29–39	L1
69	June 19	@ Indians	4–11	Hershiser (7–4)	Gordon (5–3)	—	Jacobs Field	42,276	29–40	L2
70	June 20	@ Indians	4–5	Shuey (1–1)	Stanton (3–2)	—	Jacobs Field	42,306	29–41	L3
71	June 21	@ Rangers	4–14	Hill (8–5)	Minchey (0–1)	—	The Ballpark in Arlington	40,726	29–42	L4
72	June 22	@ Rangers	2–8	Pavlik (10–1)	Wakefield (4–8)	—	The Ballpark in Arlington	46,444	29–43	L5
73	June 23	@ Rangers	6–4	Stanton (4–2)	Cook (3–1)	Slocumb (10)	The Ballpark in Arlington	39,399	30–43	W1
74	June 25	Indians	0–4	Hershiser (8–4)	Gordon (5–4)	—	Fenway Park	33,576	30–44	L1
75	June 26	Indians	6–4 (15)	Garcés (2–2)	Embree (1–1)	—	Fenway Park	33,727	31–44	W1
76	June 27	Tigers	6–9	Lira (5–7)	Minchey (0–2)	—	Fenway Park	29,582	31–45	L1
77	June 28	Tigers	8–5	Wakefield (5–8)	Williams (1–5)	—	Fenway Park	27,578	32–45	W1
78	June 29	Tigers	13–6	Eshelman (3–2)	Keagle (3–6)	—	Fenway Park	33,509	33–45	W2
79	June 30	Tigers	9–4	Gordon (6–4)	Sodowsky (1–3)	—	Fenway Park	31,217	34–45	W3

July: 13–13

#	Date	Opponent	Score	Win	Loss	Save	Stadium	Attendance	Record	Streak
80	July 1	@ Yankees	0–2	Key (4–6)	Clemens (3–7)	Wetteland (26)	Yankee Stadium	27,734	34–46	L1
81	July 2	@ Yankees	5–7	Nelson (3–2)	Hudson (2–3)	Wetteland (27)	Yankee Stadium	28,310	34–47	L2
—	July 3	@ Yankees	Postponed (rain). Makeup date September 23.							
82	July 4	@ Orioles	6–8	Mussina (11–5)	Wakefield (5–9)	Myers (17)	Camden Yards	47,075	34–48	L3
83	July 5	@ Orioles	7–3	Sele (3–5)	Wells (5–8)	—	Camden Yards	47,237	35–48	W1
84	July 6	@ Orioles	3–4	Coppinger (4–0)	Clemens (3–8)	Myers (18)	Camden Yards	47,500	35–49	L1
85	July 7	@ Orioles	7–5	Hudson (3–3)	Myers (0–2)	Slocumb (11)	Camden Yards	47,532	36–49	W1
86	July 11	@ Tigers	11–4	Clemens (4–8)	Williams (2–6)	—	Tiger Stadium	15,826	37–49	W2
87	July 12	@ Tigers	11–3	Gordon (7–4)	Olivares (4–6)	—	Tiger Stadium	19,535	38–49	W3
88	July 13	@ Tigers	10–5	Sele (4–5)	Nitkowski (1–1)	—	Tiger Stadium	16,671	39–49	W4
89	July 14	@ Tigers	6–4	Moyer (5–1)	Lira (6–8)	Slocumb (12)	Tiger Stadium	19,670	40–49	W5
90	July 15	Yankees	8–6	Wakefield (6–9)	Hutton (0–1)	Slocumb (13)	Fenway Park	33,263	41–49	W6
91	July 16	Yankees	5–9	Key (7–6)	Clemens (4–9)	—	Fenway Park	34,676	41–50	L1
92	July 17	Yankees	12–11	Eshelman (4–2)	Wetteland (0–2)	—	Fenway Park	34,082	42–50	W1
93	July 18	Orioles	3–6	Wells (6–9)	Sele (4–6)	Myers (19)	Fenway Park	33,014	42–51	L1
94	July 19	Orioles	13–2	Moyer (6–1)	Erickson (5–8)	—	Fenway Park	32,262	43–51	W1
95	July 20	Orioles	2–0	Wakefield (7–9)	Coppinger (5–1)	Slocumb (14)	Fenway Park	33,590	44–51	W2
96	July 21	Orioles	6–10 (10)	Myers (1–2)	Stanton (4–3)	—	Fenway Park	34,432	44–52	L1
97	July 22	Royals	2–5	Belcher (9–5)	Gordon (7–5)	—	Fenway Park	28,109	44–53	L2
98	July 23	Royals	5–7	Appier (9–7)	Sele (4–7)	—	Fenway Park	23,711	44–54	L3
99	July 24	Royals	12–2	Moyer (7–1)	Linton (4–6)	—	Fenway Park	33,381	45–54	W1
100	July 25	@ Twins	6–16	Parra (2–3)	Wakefield (7–10)	—	Metrodome	13,924	45–55	L1
101	July 26	@ Twins	1–5	Radke (6–13)	Clemens (4–10)	—	Metrodome	17,768	45–56	L2
102	July 27	@ Twins	9–5	Gordon (8–5)	Naulty (3–1)	—	Metrodome	22,128	46–56	W1
103	July 28	@ Twins	8–9	Aguilera (4–4)	Sele (4–8)	Naulty (4)	Metrodome	17,448	46–57	L1
104	July 30	@ Royals	0–7	Rosado (2–1)	Eshelman (4–3)	—	Kauffman Stadium	17,166	46–58	L2
105	July 31	@ Royals	5–3	Wakefield (8–10)	Haney (8–10)	Slocumb (15)	Kauffman Stadium	17,527	47–58	W1

August: 22–9

#	Date	Opponent	Score	Win	Loss	Save	Stadium	Attendance	Record	Streak
106	August 1	@ Royals	4–9	Belcher (10–6)	Clemens (4–11)	—	Kauffman Stadium	18,934	47–59	L1
107	August 2	Twins	11–10	Brandenburg (2–3)	Naulty (3–2)	—	Fenway Park	28,041	48–59	W1
108	August 3 (1)	Twins	6–3	Sele (5–8)	Rodriguez (10–9)	Hudson (1)	Fenway Park	19,860	49–59	W2
109	August 3 (2)	Twins	0–6	Aldred (5–7)	Suppan (0–1)	—	Fenway Park	29,135	49–60	L1
110	August 4	Twins	13–6	Eshelman (5–3)	Klingenbeck (0–1)	—	Fenway Park	29,939	50–60	W1
111	August 5	Blue Jays	3–1	Wakefield (9–10)	Guzmán (9–7)	—	Fenway Park	23,884	51–60	W2
112	August 6	Blue Jays	3–2	Maddux (1–1)	Hanson (10–13)	Slocumb (16)	Fenway Park	25,264	52–60	W3
113	August 7	Blue Jays	8–0	Gordon (9–5)	Hentgen (13–7)	—	Fenway Park	30,443	53–60	W4
114	August 8	Blue Jays	6–9	Williams (1–0)	Sele (5–9)	Timlin (21)	Fenway Park	32,696	53–61	L1
115	August 9 (1)	@ Brewers	9–7	Suppan (1–1)	Van Egmond (1–3)	Slocumb (17)	Milwaukee County Stadium	—	54–61	W1
116	August 9 (2)	@ Brewers	4–1	Eshelman (6–3)	Bones (7–12)	Belinda (1)	Milwaukee County Stadium	19,541	55–61	W2
117	August 10	@ Brewers	3–2	Wakefield (10–10)	Eldred (2–2)	—	Milwaukee County Stadium	20,297	56–61	W3
118	August 11	@ Brewers	2–0	Clemens (5–11)	McDonald (10–7)	Belinda (2)	Milwaukee County Stadium	19,178	57–61	W4
119	August 12	@ Blue Jays	1–5	Hentgen (14–7)	Gordon (9–6)	—	SkyDome	33,250	57–62	L1
120	August 13	@ Blue Jays	7–5	Brandenburg (3–3)	Williams (1–1)	Slocumb (18)	SkyDome	30,502	58–62	W1
121	August 14	@ Blue Jays	8–6	Belinda (2–1)	Crabtree (5–3)	Slocumb (19)	SkyDome	32,354	59–62	W2
122	August 16	Angels	3–6	Springer (3–1)	Wakefield (10–11)	Percival (30)	Fenway Park	30,693	59–63	L1
123	August 17	Angels	6–0	Clemens (6–11)	Finley (11–12)	—	Fenway Park	32,497	60–63	W1
124	August 18	Angels	3–4	Holtz (2–2)	Brandenburg (3–4)	Percival (31)	Fenway Park	25,224	60–64	L1
125	August 19	Angels	10–9	Lacy (1–0)	Gohr (5–9)	Slocumb (20)	Fenway Park	25,779	61–64	W1
126	August 20	Athletics	4–3	Garcés (3–2)	Mohler (4–2)	Slocumb (21)	Fenway Park	25,094	62–64	W2
127	August 21	Athletics	6–4	Brandenburg (4–4)	Johns (6–12)	Slocumb (22)	Fenway Park	26,362	63–64	W3
128	August 22	Athletics	2–1	Clemens (7–11)	Acre (0–1)	—	Fenway Park	30,503	64–64	W4
129	August 23	Mariners	4–6	Bosio (4–3)	Brandenburg (4–5)	Ayala (2)	Fenway Park	33,079	64–65	L1
130	August 24	Mariners	9–5	Lacy (2–0)	Wells (11–6)	—	Fenway Park	32,928	65–65	W1
131	August 25	Mariners	8–5	Maddux (2–1)	Wagner (3–5)	Slocumb (23)	Fenway Park	34,377	66–65	W2
132	August 26	@ Angels	4–1	Wakefield (11–11)	Dickson (1–1)	—	Anaheim Stadium	16,886	67–65	W3
133	August 27	@ Angels	2–1	Clemens (8–11)	Finley (12–13)	Slocumb (24)	Anaheim Stadium	19,847	68–65	W4
134	August 28	@ Angels	7–4	Gordon (10–6)	Boskie (12–7)	—	Anaheim Stadium	20,894	69–65	W5
135	August 30	@ Athletics	0–7	Telgheder (2–5)	Maddux (2–2)	—	Oakland-Alameda County Coliseum	20,894	69–66	L1
136	August 31	@ Athletics	0–8	Adams (2–2)	Wakefield (11–12)	—	Oakland-Alameda County Coliseum	32,116	69–67	L2

September: 16–10

#	Date	Opponent	Score	Win	Loss	Save	Stadium	Attendance	Record	Streak
137	September 1	@ Athletics	8–3	Sele (6–9)	Wasdin (7–7)	—	Oakland-Alameda County Coliseum	15,021	70–67	W1
138	September 2	@ Mariners	9–8 (10)	Slocumb (3–5)	Carmona (6–3)	—	Kingdome	24,470	71–67	W2
139	September 3	@ Mariners	9–11	Torres (1–1)	Gordon (10–7)	Charlton (15)	Kingdome	17,374	71–68	L1
140	September 4	@ Mariners	8–5	Mahomes (2–4)	Hitchcock (12–8)	Slocumb (25)	Kingdome	22,642	72–68	W1
141	September 6	@ White Sox	10–3	Wakefield (12–12)	Álvarez (15–8)	—	Comiskey Park	18,417	73–68	W2
142	September 7	@ White Sox	3–4	Fernandez (13–9)	Clemens (8–12)	Hernández (36)	Comiskey Park	28,219	73–69	L1
143	September 8	@ White Sox	4–7	Baldwin (11–4)	Sele (6–10)	Hernández (37)	Comiskey Park	19,983	73–70	L2
144	September 9	Brewers	0–6	Karl (12–7)	Gordon (10–8)	—	Fenway Park	22,386	73–71	L3
145	September 10	Brewers	10–11	García (4–3)	Hudson (3–4)	Fetters (28)	Fenway Park	20,487	73–72	L4
146	September 11	Brewers	4–1	Wakefield (13–12)	Eldred (3–4)	Slocumb (26)	Fenway Park	21,310	74–72	W1
147	September 13	White Sox	9–5	Clemens (9–12)	Baldwin (11–5)	Slocumb (27)	Fenway Park	28,907	75–72	W2
148	September 14	White Sox	5–13	Castillo (4–3)	Gordon (10–9)	Simas (2)	Fenway Park	31,481	75–73	L1
149	September 15	White Sox	9–8	Slocumb (4–5)	Hernández (6–4)	—	Fenway Park	—	76–73	W1
150	September 17	@ Tigers	4–2	Brandenburg (5–5)	Lira (6–14)	Slocumb (28)	Tiger Stadium	8,180	77–73	W2
151	September 18	@ Tigers	4–0	Clemens (10–12)	Thompson (1–6)	—	Tiger Stadium	8,779	78–73	W3
152	September 19	@ Tigers	8–3	Gordon (11–8)	Miller (0–3)	—	Tiger Stadium	7,666	79–73	W4
153	September 20	@ Yankees	4–2	Wakefield (14–12)	Polley (1–2)	Slocumb (29)	Yankee Stadium	39,883	80–73	W5
154	September 21	@ Yankees	11–12 (10)	Wetteland (2–3)	Hudson (3–5)	—	Yankee Stadium	54,599	80–74	L1
155	September 22	@ Yankees	3–4	Rivera (8–3)	Sele (6–11)	Wetteland (42)	Yankee Stadium	34,422	80–75	L2
156	September 23	@ Yankees	4–3 (11)	Slocumb (5–5)	Boehringer (2–4)	Mahomes (1)	Yankee Stadium	22,728	81–75	W1
157	September 24	Orioles	13–8	Gordon (12–8)	Wells (11–14)	Mahomes (2)	Fenway Park	28,557	82–75	W2
158	September 25	Orioles	2–6	Krivda (3–5)	Wakefield (14–13)	Benítez (3)	Fenway Park	28,432	82–76	L1
159	September 26	Yankees	5–3	Maddux (3–2)	Key (12–11)	Slocumb (30)	Fenway Park	32,367	83–76	W1
160	September 27	Yankees	7–5	Sele (7–11)	Gooden (11–7)	Slocumb (31)	Fenway Park	32,573	84–76	W2
161	September 28	Yankees	2–4	Mendoza (4–5)	Clemens (10–13)	Wetteland (43)	Fenway Park	33,612	84–77	L1
162	September 29	Yankees	6–5	Mahomes (3–4)	Polley (1–3)	—	Fenway Park	32,563	85–77	W1

== Awards and honors ==
- Mo Vaughn – AL Player of the Month (May)

All-Star Game

- Mo Vaughn, reserve 1B (started game)

== Farm system ==
The Lowell Spinners replaced the Utica Blue Sox as the Red Sox' Class A-Short Season affiliate.

Level	Team	League	Manager
AAA	Pawtucket Red Sox	International League	Buddy Bailey
AA	Trenton Thunder	Eastern League	Ken Macha
A-Advanced	Sarasota Red Sox	Florida State League	DeMarlo Hale
A	Michigan Battle Cats	Midwest League	Tom Barrett
A-Short Season	Lowell Spinners	New York–Penn League	Billy Gardner Jr.
Rookie	GCL Red Sox	Gulf Coast League	Bob Geren
Rookie	DSL cooperative	Dominican Summer League	Rick Aponte

The Red Sox shared a DSL team with the Houston Astros.
