= 1996 Minnesota Twins season =

1996 Minnesota Twins
- League: American League
- Division: Central
- Ballpark: Hubert H. Humphrey Metrodome
- City: Minneapolis
- Record: 78–84 (.481)
- Divisional place: 5th
- Owners: Carl Pohlad
- General managers: Terry Ryan
- Managers: Tom Kelly
- Television: WCCO-TV; Midwest Sports Channel (Bert Blyleven, Dick Bremer, Ryan Lefebvre, Tommy John)
- Radio: 830 WCCO AM (Herb Carneal, John Gordon)

The 1996 Minnesota Twins season was the 36th season for the Minnesota Twins franchise in the Twin Cities of Minnesota, their 15th season at Hubert H. Humphrey Metrodome and the 96th overall in the American League.

Prior to spring training, the Twins were projected to be a contending team. The team's chances significantly worsened on March 28, 1996. Kirby Puckett, the team's franchise player, had been tattooing the Grapefruit League (spring training) for a .360 average, but that morning woke up without vision in his right eye. He was eventually diagnosed with glaucoma. Several surgeries over the next few months could not restore vision in the eye. Puckett announced his retirement from baseball on July 12. After beginning the season under the melancholy cloud of the Puckett situation, Manager Tom Kelly's team finished the year with a 78–84 record, which put it in fourth place in the American League Central.

== Offseason ==
- October 9: Luis Rivas was signed as an amateur free agent by the Twins.
- December 5: Paul Molitor was signed as a free agent by the Twins.
- January 29: Signed Roberto Kelly as a free agent.

== Regular season ==
- On April 24, the Twins crushed the Detroit Tigers 24–11. The total of runs—both the Twins' 24 and the game's total of 35—were new highs in Twins history for a nine-inning game.
- Only second baseman Chuck Knoblauch was selected from the Twins for the All-Star Game at Veteran's Stadium in Philadelphia. Entering in the eighth inning as a reserve, he singled. His was just one of seven American League hits in the National League's 6–0 victory.
- On July 25 at the Metrodome, seven Twins hit eight doubles to set a new mark. The Twins drubbed the Boston Red Sox 16–6.
- By season's end, several other offensive records had been set: Chuck Knoblauch scored 140 times, besting Rod Carew's previous club high of 128. Chip Hale had nineteen pinch hits on the year. New season highs were set for most runs scored (877) and most runs allowed (900). In addition, new club season highs were set in most hits (1663), most RBI (812), most doubles (332) and highest team batting average (.288).

=== Offense ===
Individual players on the team did excel. Paul Molitor had a standout year in his first year with his hometown team, playing as the regular designated hitter and winning a Silver Slugger Award at that position. He played in all but one game and hit .341 with 113 RBI and a league-best 225 hits. On September 16 in Kansas City, he collected his 3,000th hit, a triple off of José Rosado. He is the only player to obtain his 3,000th hit via a triple. Along with Molitor, Chuck Knoblauch also hit .341. Among the hits were 35 doubles. He also stole 45 bases. Marty Cordova had a respectable year, driving in 111 runs.

Team Leaders
Statistic	Player	Quantity
HR	Marty Cordova	16
RBI	Paul Molitor	113
BA	Paul Molitor and Chuck Knoblauch	.341
Runs	Chuck Knoblauch	140

=== Pitching ===
The pitching did not match the offense. Brad Radke, Frank Rodriguez, and Rich Robertson (the three R's) all spent the whole season in the starting rotation and had losing records. The team's experiment moving Rick Aguilera from the closer's role to the starting rotation was not a successful one, as he started only 19 games. Scott Aldred also started 17 games for the team. Radke had the lowest ERA among the starters at 4.46. The rest were over five. Dave Stevens got the most saves at 11, but he was not an effective closer. Mike Trombley and Dan Naulty had effective seasons out of the bullpen, but nobody else had an ERA under five. Epitomizing the pitching woes, Mike Milchin had an ERA of 8.31 but the team still let him pitch in 26 games.

Team Leaders
Statistic	Player	Quantity
ERA	Brad Radke	4.46
Wins	Frank Rodriguez	13
Saves	Dave Stevens	11
Strikeouts	Brad Radke	148

=== Defense ===
The only truly regular starters in the field were Knoblauch at second base, Pat Meares at shortstop, and Cordova in left field. In a less-than-encouraging sign for the team's postseason prospects, Scott Stahoviak saw a majority of the time at first base. Dave Hollins played 116 games at third, with Jeff Reboulet and Todd Walker also seeing time. Greg Myers and Matt Walbeck platooned at catcher. Rich Becker had the unenviable task of replacing Puckett in center field and played 121 games there. Right field was a mish-mash, with Matt Lawton playing 60 games at the position, Roberto Kelly 54, Denny Hocking 33, and Ron Coomer 23.

=== Season standings ===
AL Central
Team	W	L	Pct.	GB	Home	Road
Cleveland Indians	99	62	.615	—	51‍–‍29	48‍–‍33
Chicago White Sox	85	77	.525	14½	44‍–‍37	41‍–‍40
Milwaukee Brewers	80	82	.494	19½	38‍–‍43	42‍–‍39
Minnesota Twins	78	84	.481	21½	39‍–‍43	39‍–‍41
Kansas City Royals	75	86	.466	24	37‍–‍43	38‍–‍43

=== Record vs. opponents ===
1996 American League record Source: MLB Standings Grid – 1996
Team	BAL	BOS	CAL	CWS	CLE	DET	KC	MIL	MIN	NYY	OAK	SEA	TEX	TOR
Baltimore	—	7–6	6–6	4–8	5–7	11–2	9–3	9–3	7–5	3–10	9–4	7–5	3–10–1	8–5
Boston	6–7	—	8–4	6–6	1–11	12–1	3–9	7–5	6–6	7–6	8–5	7–6	6–6	8–5
California	6–6	4–8	—	6–6	4–9	6–6	4–8	7–5	4–8	7–6	6–7	5–8	4–9	7–5
Chicago	8–4	6–6	6–6	—	5–8	10–3	7–6	6–7	6–7	6–7	5–7	5–7	8–4	7–5
Cleveland	7–5	11–1	9–4	8–5	—	12–0	7–6	7–6	10–3	3–9	6–6	8–4	4–8	7–5
Detroit	2–11	1–12	6–6	3–10	0–12	—	6–6	4–8	6–6	5–8	4–8	6–6	4–9	6–7
Kansas City	3–9	9–3	8–4	6–7	6–7	6–6	—	4–9	6–7	4–8	5–7	7–5	6–6	5–8
Milwaukee	3–9	5–7	5–7	7–6	6–7	8–4	9–4	—	9–4	6–6	7–5	4–9	6–7	5–7
Minnesota	5–7	6–6	8–4	7–6	3–10	6–6	7–6	4–9	—	5–7	6–7	6–6	7–5	8–5
New York	10–3	6–7	6–7	7–6	9–3	8–5	8–4	6–6	7–5	—	9–3	3–9	5–7	8–5
Oakland	4–9	5–8	7–6	7–5	6–6	8–4	7–5	5–7	7–6	3–9	—	8–5	7–6	4–8
Seattle	5–7	6–7	8–5	7–5	4–8	6–6	5–7	9–4	6–6	9–3	5–8	—	10–3	5–7
Texas	10–3–1	6–6	9–4	4–8	8–4	9–4	6–6	7–6	5–7	7–5	6–7	3–10	—	10–2
Toronto	5–8	5–8	5–7	5–7	5–7	7–6	8–5	7–5	5–8	5–8	8–4	7–5	2–10	—

=== Game log ===
1996 Game Log: 78–84 (Home: 39–43; Away: 39–41)
April: 13–12 (Home: 8–7; Away: 5–5)

#	Date	Opponent	Score	Win	Loss	Save	Attendance	Record
1	April 1	Tigers	8–6	**Radke** (1–0)	Lira	**Stevens** (1)	30,185	1–0
2	April 2	Tigers	6–10	Sodowsky	**Robertson** (0–1)	—	20,164	1–1
3	April 3	Tigers	16–7	**Mahomes** (1–0)	Aldred	—	12,256	2–1
4	April 5	Orioles	1–2	Mercker	**Guardado** (0–1)	Myers	22,744	2–2
5	April 6	Orioles	8–3	**Radke** (2–0)	Haynes	—	22,334	3–2
6	April 7	Orioles	2–4	Mussina	**Robertson** (0–2)	Myers	14,580	3–3
7	April 9	@ Red Sox	1–9	Gordon	**Rodriguez** (0–1)	—	30,843	3–4
8	April 11	@ Red Sox	6–5	**Radke** (3–0)	Clemens	**Stevens** (2)	15,594	4–4
9	April 12	@ Orioles	2–3	Mussina	**Robertson** (0–3)	—	42,602	4–5
10	April 13	@ Orioles	6–7	Benitez	**Mahomes** (1–1)	—	42,644	4–6
11	April 14	@ Orioles	4–1	**Rodriguez** (1–1)	Haynes	**Stevens** (3)	42,660	5–6
12	April 16	Indians	2–7	Hershiser	**Radke** (3–1)	—	13,103	5–7
13	April 17	Indians	9–8	**Hansell** (1–0)	Shuey	**Stevens** (4)	11,276	6–7
14	April 19	Yankees	7–1	**Rodriguez** (2–1)	Gooden	—	20,279	7–7
15	April 20	Yankees	6–7	Wickman	**Guardado** (0–2)	Wetteland	24,586	7–8
16	April 21	Yankees	5–9	Rogers	**Radke** (3–2)	—	20,115	7–9
17	April 22	Red Sox	1–4	Sele	**Robertson** (0–4)	Slocumb	11,340	7–10
18	April 23	Red Sox	8–6	**Naulty** (1–0)	Hudson	**Stevens** (5)	11,533	8–10
19	April 24	@ Tigers	24–11	**Bennett** (1–0)	Veres	—	12,189	9–10
20	April 25	@ Tigers	11–1	**Hawkins** (1–0)	Aldred	**Hansell** (1)	11,804	10–10
21	April 26	@ Yankees	4–5	Rivera	**Radke** (3–3)	Wetteland	14,450	10–11
22	April 27	@ Yankees	8–6 (10)	**Bennett** (2–0)	Wickman	—	20,025	11–11
23	April 28	@ Yankees	3–6	Rivera	**Rodriguez** (2–2)	Wetteland	24,793	11–12
24	April 29	Royals	11–6	**Hansell** (2–0)	Clark	**Bennett** (1)	10,237	12–12
25	April 30	Royals	16–7	**Naulty** (2–0)	Magnante	—	10,503	13–12

May: 10–16 (Home: 4–6; Away: 6–10)

#	Date	Opponent	Score	Win	Loss	Save	Attendance	Record
26	May 1	Royals	6–5 (10)	**Stevens** (1–0)	Montgomery	—	11,975	14–12
27	May 3	@ Angels	1–4	Finley	**Robertson** (0–5)	Percival	24,505	14–13
28	May 4	@ Angels	2–5	Grimsley	**Rodriguez** (2–3)	—	29,264	14–14
29	May 5	@ Angels	1–5	Boskie	**Hawkins** (1–1)	—	35,541	14–15
30	May 6	@ Mariners	4–5	Wells	**Radke** (3–4)	Charlton	32,203	14–16
31	May 7	@ Mariners	2–0	**Parra** (1–0)	Wolcott	**Stevens** (6)	15,626	15–16
32	May 8	@ Mariners	7–5 (10)	**Guardado** (1–2)	Wells	**Stevens** (7)	22,175	16–16
33	May 10	@ Athletics	5–15	Wojciechowski	**Rodriguez** (2–4)	—	8,278	16–17
34	May 11	@ Athletics	5–12	Prieto	**Radke** (3–5)	—	15,791	16–18
35	May 12	@ Athletics	3–8	Wengert	**Parra** (1–1)	—	13,430	16–19
36	May 14	Blue Jays	2–4	Hanson	**Robertson** (0–6)	Timlin	13,483	16–20
37	May 15	Blue Jays	2–1	**Rodriguez** (3–4)	Hentgen	—	11,793	17–20
38	May 16	Blue Jays	4–1	**Radke** (4–5)	Quantrill	**Stevens** (8)	13,538	18–20
39	May 17	Brewers	1–12	Karl	**Parra** (1–2)	—	26,733	18–21
40	May 18	Brewers	3–7	Miranda	**Mahomes** (1–2)	Fetters	30,593	18–22
41	May 19	Brewers	2–4	Sparks	**Robertson** (0–7)	Fetters	24,411	18–23
42	May 20	Brewers	2–3	Bones	**Rodriguez** (3–5)	Fetters	13,376	18–24
43	May 21	Rangers	4–3	**Milchin** (1–0)	Henneman	—	12,323	19–24
44	May 22	Rangers	5–6	Pavlik	**Parra** (1–3)	Henneman	17,955	19–25
45	May 23	@ Blue Jays	4–5 (10)	Janzen	**Milchin** (1–1)	—	31,163	19–26
46	May 24	@ Blue Jays	4–0	**Robertson** (1–7)	Hanson	—	33,141	20–26
47	May 25	@ Blue Jays	6–4 (10)	**Guardado** (2–2)	Castillo	**Stevens** (9)	34,118	21–26
48	May 26	@ Blue Jays	9–3	**Naulty** (3–0)	Bohanon	—	30,170	22–26
49	May 28	@ Brewers	3–7	Karl	**Mahomes** (1–3)	Garcia	10,117	22–27
50	May 29	@ Brewers	8–7 (12)	**Hansell** (3–0)	Lloyd	—	14,324	23–27
51	May 31	@ Rangers	2–7	Hill	**Rodriguez** (3–6)	—	32,861	23–28

June: 15–13 (Home: 9–8; Away: 6–5)

#	Date	Opponent	Score	Win	Loss	Save	Attendance	Record
52	June 1	@ Rangers	9–5	**Milchin** (2–1)	Henneman	—	43,413	24–28
53	June 2	@ Rangers	6–5	**Guardado** (3–2)	Russell	—	33,809	25–28
54	June 3	Angels	9–3	**Trombley** (1–0)	Finley	—	10,589	26–28
55	June 4	Angels	5–3	**Rodriguez** (4–6)	Grimsley	**Guardado** (1)	10,899	27–28
56	June 5	Angels	14–3	**Aldred** (1–0)	Langston	**Hansell** (2)	10,639	28–28
57	June 7	Athletics	4–6	Reyes	**Radke** (4–6)	Corsi	14,999	28–29
58	June 8	Athletics	4–2	**Robertson** (2–7)	Wojciechowski	**Guardado** (2)	—	29–29
59	June 8	Athletics	7–13	Wasdin	**Mahomes** (1–4)	—	22,164	29–30
60	June 9	Athletics	5–3	**Rodriguez** (5–6)	Wengert	—	13,291	30–30
61	June 10	Mariners	13–6	**Aldred** (2–0)	Wagner	**Trombley** (1)	17,134	31–30
62	June 11	Mariners	8–18	Wells	**Aguilera** (0–1)	Hurtado	14,395	31–31
63	June 12	Mariners	3–5	Wolcott	**Radke** (4–7)	Charlton	15,830	31–32
64	June 14	Tigers	4–5	Gohr	**Robertson** (2–8)	Olson	22,831	31–33
65	June 15	Tigers	4–6	Olivares	**Rodriguez** (5–7)	Olson	17,099	31–34
66	June 16	Tigers	4–1	**Aguilera** (1–1)	Lira	**Hansell** (3)	20,641	32–34
67	June 17	@ Yankees	6–3	**Aldred** (3–0)	Mendoza	**Naulty** (1)	16,189	33–34
68	June 18	@ Yankees	0–2	Rogers	**Radke** (4–8)	Wetteland	17,593	33–35
69	June 20	@ Tigers	7–3	**Rodriguez** (6–7)	Olivares	—	8,310	34–35
70	June 21	@ Tigers	0–2	Lira	**Aguilera** (1–2)	—	13,127	34–36
71	June 22	@ Tigers	0–6	Williams	**Aldred** (3–1)	—	14,506	34–37
72	June 23	@ Tigers	8–10	Urbani	**Radke** (4–9)	—	13,994	34–38
73	June 24	Yankees	3–0	**Robertson** (3–8)	Pettitte	—	20,488	35–38
74	June 25	Yankees	6–1	**Rodriguez** (7–7)	Boehringer	—	—	36–38
75	June 25	Yankees	2–6	Mendoza	**Serafini** (0–1)	—	16,641	36–39
76	June 26	Yankees	1–2	Polley	**Guardado** (3–3)	Wetteland	19,116	36–40
77	June 28	@ Royals	2–6	Appier	**Radke** (4–10)	—	21,515	36–41
78	June 29	@ Royals	12–7	**Trombley** (2–0)	Linton	—	23,232	37–41
79	June 30	@ Royals	5–2	**Rodriguez** (8–7)	Gubicza	**Stevens** (10)	28,246	38–41

July: 13–14 (Home: 7–10; Away: 6–4)

#	Date	Opponent	Score	Win	Loss	Save	Attendance	Record
80	July 1	@ White Sox	10–7	**Aguilera** (2–2)	Sirotka	—	19,211	39–41
81	July 2	@ White Sox	4–7	Fernandez	**Aldred** (3–2)	Hernandez	18,357	39–42
82	July 3	@ White Sox	6–5	**Radke** (5–10)	Andujar	**Stevens** (11)	26,113	40–42
83	July 4	Royals	3–5	Linton	**Robertson** (3–9)	Montgomery	37,295	40–43
84	July 5	Royals	9–8	**Guardado** (4–3)	Montgomery	—	18,465	41–43
85	July 6	Royals	5–8	Haney	**Aguilera** (2–3)	Montgomery	18,699	41–44
86	July 7	Royals	2–8	Belcher	**Aldred** (3–3)	—	14,251	41–45
87	July 11	Indians	7–11	McDowell	**Radke** (5–11)	—	16,438	41–46
88	July 12	Indians	5–7	Mesa	**Stevens** (1–1)	Shuey	18,246	41–47
89	July 13	Indians	11–19	Ogea	**Aguilera** (2–4)	—	31,552	41–48
90	July 14	Indians	5–4	**Guardado** (5–3)	Plunk	—	25,312	42–48
91	July 15	White Sox	16–5	**Aldred** (4–3)	McCaskill	—	13,636	43–48
92	July 16	White Sox	2–11	Alvarez	**Radke** (5–12)	—	18,502	43–49
93	July 17	White Sox	4–3	**Trombley** (3–0)	Simas	—	20,755	44–49
94	July 18	@ Indians	4–5	Graves	**Guardado** (5–4)	—	40,934	44–50
95	July 19	@ Indians	3–2	**Rodriguez** (9–7)	Nagy	**Naulty** (2)	42,373	45–50
96	July 20	@ Indians	5–6 (11)	Shuey	**Stevens** (1–2)	—	43,433	45–51
97	July 21	@ Indians	5–7	McDowell	**Radke** (5–13)	Shuey	42,341	45–52
98	July 22	@ Orioles	9–5	**Robertson** (4–9)	Haynes	**Trombley** (2)	42,129	46–52
99	July 23	@ Orioles	3–2	**Aguilera** (3–4)	Wells	**Naulty** (3)	42,006	47–52
100	July 24	@ Orioles	11–4	**Rodriguez** (10–7)	Erickson	—	46,181	48–52
101	July 25	Red Sox	16–6	**Parra** (2–3)	Wakefield	—	13,924	49–52
102	July 26	Red Sox	5–1	**Radke** (6–13)	Clemens	—	17,768	50–52
103	July 27	Red Sox	5–9	Gordon	**Naulty** (3–1)	—	22,128	50–53
104	July 28	Red Sox	9–8	**Aguilera** (4–4)	Sele	**Naulty** (4)	17,448	51–53
105	July 30	Orioles	4–16	Coppinger	**Rodriguez** (10–8)	—	16,708	51–54
106	July 31	Orioles	3–9	Mussina	**Trombley** (3–1)	—	15,897	51–55

August: 16–14 (Home: 5–6; Away: 11–8)

#	Date	Opponent	Score	Win	Loss	Save	Attendance	Record
107	August 1	Orioles	2–4	Wells	**Robertson** (4–10)	Myers	20,379	51–56
108	August 2	@ Red Sox	10–11	Brandenburg	**Naulty** (3–2)	—	28,041	51–57
109	August 3	@ Red Sox	3–6	Sele	**Rodriguez** (10–9)	Hudson	19,860	51–58
110	August 3	@ Red Sox	6–0	**Aldred** (5–3)	Suppan	—	29,135	52–58
111	August 4	@ Red Sox	6–13	Eshelman	**Klingenbeck** (0–1)	—	29,939	52–59
112	August 6	@ Angels	4–1	**Radke** (7–13)	Springer	**Guardado** (3)	20,058	53–59
113	August 7	@ Angels	4–0	**Robertson** (5–10)	Finley	—	18,611	54–59
114	August 8	@ Angels	13–5	**Aguilera** (5–4)	Boskie	—	21,283	55–59
115	August 9	@ Mariners	6–5	**Parra** (3–3)	Wolcott	**Rodriguez** (1)	25,130	56–59
116	August 10	@ Mariners	10–4	**Klingenbeck** (1–1)	Hitchcock	—	34,381	57–59
117	August 11	@ Mariners	6–3	**Radke** (8–13)	Wells	**Rodriguez** (2)	36,114	58–59
118	August 12	@ Athletics	1–11	Prieto	**Robertson** (5–11)	—	10,071	58–60
119	August 13	@ Athletics	6–2	**Aguilera** (6–4)	Wengert	—	11,156	59–60
120	August 14	@ Athletics	13–7	**Rodriguez** (11–9)	Telgheder	—	12,729	60–60
121	August 16	Blue Jays	5–4 (10)	**Parra** (4–3)	Quantrill	—	19,838	61–60
122	August 17	Blue Jays	11–1	**Robertson** (6–11)	Hanson	—	20,354	62–60
123	August 18	Blue Jays	2–6	Hentgen	**Aguilera** (6–5)	—	18,010	62–61
124	August 19	Brewers	1–6	D'Amico	**Rodriguez** (11–10)	—	21,879	62–62
125	August 20	Brewers	12–7	**Parra** (5–3)	Bones	—	14,630	63–62
126	August 21	Brewers	7–10	Jones	**Stevens** (1–3)	Fetters	15,885	63–63
127	August 22	Rangers	2–11	Hill	**Robertson** (6–12)	—	17,342	63–64
128	August 23	Rangers	9–2	**Aguilera** (7–5)	Oliver	—	16,166	64–64
129	August 24	Rangers	6–5	**Rodriguez** (12–10)	Pavlik	**Trombley** (3)	16,648	65–64
130	August 25	Rangers	2–13	Witt	**Miller** (0–1)	—	14,818	65–65
131	August 26	@ Blue Jays	3–5	Guzman	**Radke** (8–14)	Timlin	31,134	65–66
132	August 27	@ Blue Jays	6–4 (11)	**Trombley** (4–1)	Quantrill	—	30,033	66–66
133	August 28	@ Blue Jays	1–6	Hentgen	**Aguilera** (7–6)	—	30,106	66–67
134	August 29	@ Brewers	6–1	**Rodriguez** (13–10)	Karl	—	14,922	67–67
135	August 30	@ Brewers	4–5 (12)	Wickman	**Parra** (5–4)	—	17,444	67–68
136	August 31	@ Brewers	2–3	Jones	**Robertson** (6–13)	Fetters	20,187	67–69

September: 11–15 (Home: 6–6; Away: 5–9)

#	Date	Opponent	Score	Win	Loss	Save	Attendance	Record
137	September 1	@ Brewers	6–2	**Aldred** (6–3)	Van Egmond	—	17,074	68–69
138	September 2	@ Rangers	6–4	**Aguilera** (8–6)	Hill	**Guardado** (4)	24,786	69–69
139	September 3	@ Rangers	7–9	Witt	**Rodriguez** (13–11)	Henneman	28,401	69–70
140	September 4	@ Rangers	7–6	**Robertson** (7–13)	Heredia	**Trombley** (4)	29,744	70–70
141	September 6	Angels	6–2	**Radke** (9–14)	Finley	—	13,006	71–70
142	September 7	Angels	6–3	**Stevens** (2–3)	Boskie	**Trombley** (5)	51,011	72–70
143	September 8	Angels	2–4	Abbott	**Rodriguez** (13–12)	Percival	14,378	72–71
144	September 10	Athletics	0–7	Telgheder	**Robertson** (7–14)	—	9,676	72–72
145	September 11	Athletics	7–2	**Radke** (10–14)	Adams	—	9,493	73–72
146	September 12	Athletics	4–3 (12)	**Stevens** (3–3)	Mohler	—	9,712	74–72
147	September 13	Mariners	7–13	Wells	**Miller** (0–2)	—	15,510	74–73
148	September 14	Mariners	3–5 (10)	Ayala	**Guardado** (5–5)	Charlton	18,002	74–74
149	September 15	Mariners	0–7	Torres	**Robertson** (7–15)	—	25,142	74–75
150	September 16	@ Royals	5–6	Rosado	**Radke** (10–15)	Bluma	16,843	74–76
151	September 17	@ Royals	2–4	Haney	**Aldred** (6–4)	Bluma	11,809	74–77
152	September 18	@ Royals	7–4	**Miller** (1–2)	Belcher	—	11,588	75–77
153	September 19	@ White Sox	3–8	Sirotka	**Rodriguez** (13–13)	Castillo	14,253	75–78
154	September 20	@ White Sox	3–7	Tapani	**Robertson** (7–16)	—	15,673	75–79
155	September 21	@ White Sox	4–3	**Radke** (11–15)	Alvarez	**Trombley** (6)	18,866	76–79
156	September 22	@ White Sox	1–5	Fernandez	**Aldred** (6–5)	—	20,111	76–80
157	September 23	@ Indians	6–7	Graves	**Parra** (5–5)	Mesa	42,299	76–81
158	September 24	@ Indians	5–7	Ogea	**Rodriguez** (13–14)	Mesa	42,272	76–82
159	September 25	@ Indians	3–6	Nagy	**Robertson** (7–17)	—	42,469	76–83
160	September 27	White Sox	2–4	Fernandez	**Radke** (11–16)	Hernandez	13,058	76–84
161	September 28	White Sox	7–6	**Trombley** (5–1)	Castillo	—	34,008	77–84
162	September 29	White Sox	5–4 (10)	**Guardado** (6–5)	Hernandez	—	13,306	78–84

Legend: = Win = Loss
Bold = Twins team member

=== Detailed records ===
American League
Opponent	W	L	WP	RS	RA
AL East
Baltimore Orioles	5	7	0.417	55	60
Boston Red Sox	6	6	0.500	76	78
Detroit Tigers	6	6	0.500	92	68
New York Yankees	5	7	0.417	51	48
Toronto Blue Jays	8	5	0.615	59	44
Total	30	31	0.492	333	298
AL Central
Chicago White Sox	7	6	0.538	67	75
Cleveland Indians	3	10	0.231	70	96
Kansas City Royals	7	6	0.538	85	76
Milwaukee Brewers	4	9	0.308	57	74
**Minnesota Twins**					
Total	21	31	0.404	279	321
AL West
California Angels	8	4	0.667	67	38
Oakland Athletics	6	7	0.462	64	91
Seattle Mariners	6	6	0.500	69	76
Texas Rangers	7	5	0.583	65	76
Total	27	22	0.551	265	281
Season Total	78	84	0.481	877	900

Month	Games	Won	Lost	Win %	RS	RA
April	25	13	12	0.520	175	141
May	26	10	16	0.385	97	138
June	28	15	13	0.536	151	134
July	27	13	14	0.481	171	188
August	30	16	14	0.533	169	161
September	26	11	15	0.423	114	138
Total	162	78	84	0.481	877	900

	Games	Won	Lost	Win %	RS	RA
Home	82	39	43	0.476	452	483
Away	80	39	41	0.488	425	417
Total	162	78	84	0.481	877	900

=== Roster ===
1996 Minnesota Twins
**Roster**
**Pitchers**: 38 Rick Aguilera; 57 Scott Aldred; 59 Erik Bennett; 18 Eddie Guardado; 19 Greg Hansell; 32 LaTroy Hawkins; 52 Scott Klingenbeck; 20 Pat Mahomes; 51 Mike Milchin; 59 Travis Miller; 31 Dan Naulty; 56 José Parra; 22 Brad Radke; 47 Rich Robertson; 33 Frankie Rodriguez; 16 Dan Serafini; 41 Dave Stevens; 21 Mike Trombley	**Catchers**: 27 Mike Durant; 24 Greg Myers; 9 Matt Walbeck; **Infielders**: 8 Ron Coomer; 12 Chip Hale; 15 Dave Hollins; 11 Chuck Knoblauch; 2 Pat Meares; 4 Paul Molitor; 23 Tom Quinlan; 26 Brian Raabe; 17 Jeff Reboulet; 37 Scott Stahoviak; 13 Todd Walker	**Outfielders**: 25 Rich Becker; 51 Brent Brede; 40 Marty Cordova; 7 Denny Hocking; 5 Roberto Kelly; 50 Matt Lawton	**Manager**: 10 Tom Kelly; **Coaches**: 46 Terry Crowley (hitting); 35 Ron Gardenhire (third base); 43 Rick Stelmaszek (bullpen); 42 Dick Such (pitching); 45 Scott Ullger

=== Notable Transactions ===
- May 28: Selected Scott Aldred off waivers from the Detroit Tigers.
- June 4: In the 1996 amateur draft, the Twins drafted future major leaguers such as Jacque Jones (2nd round), Chad Allen (4th round), and Chad Moeller (7th round). The Twins botched the signing of first baseman Travis Lee, whom they signed in the first round with the second overall pick. Lee exploited a never-before used clause that allows a draft pick to become a free agent if a team doesn't make an offer within 15 days of the draft. After the Twins failed to do this, Lee left for the Arizona Diamondbacks, who gave him a $10 million signing bonus. The Twins had the last laugh, however, as Lee has proven to be a below-average hitter who has bounced from team to team.
- August 29: Traded Dave Hollins to the Seattle Mariners for a player to be named later. On September 30, the Mariners sent David Ortiz to the Twins to complete the trade.
- September 13, 1996: David Ortiz was sent by the Seattle Mariners to the Minnesota Twins to complete an earlier deal made on August 29, 1996. The Seattle Mariners sent a player to be named later to the Minnesota Twins for Dave Hollins.

== Player stats ==
= Indicates team leader

= Indicates league leader

=== Batting ===
==== Starters by position ====
Note: Pos = Position; G = Games played; AB = At bats; H = Hits; Avg. = Batting average; HR = Home runs; RBI = Runs batted in

Pos	Player	G	AB	H	Avg.	HR	RBI
C	Greg Myers	97	329	94	.286	6	47
1B	Scott Stahoviak	130	405	115	.284	13	61
2B	Chuck Knoblauch	153	578	197	.341	13	72
SS	Pat Meares	152	517	138	.267	8	67
3B	Dave Hollins	121	422	102	.242	13	53
LF	Marty Cordova	145	569	176	.309	16	111
CF	Rich Becker	148	525	153	.291	12	71
RF	Matt Lawton	79	252	65	.258	6	42
DH	Paul Molitor	161	660	225	.341	9	113

==== Other batters ====
Note: G = Games played; AB = At bats; H = Hits; Avg. = Batting average; HR = Home runs; RBI = Runs batted in

Player	G	AB	H	Avg.	HR	RBI
Roberto Kelly	98	322	104	.323	6	47
Jeff Reboulet	107	234	52	.222	0	23
Ron Coomer	95	233	69	.296	12	41
Matt Walbeck	63	215	48	.223	2	24
Denny Hocking	49	127	25	.197	1	10
Chip Hale	85	87	24	.276	1	16
Todd Walker	25	82	21	.256	0	6
Mike Durant	40	81	17	.210	0	5
Brent Brede	10	20	6	.300	0	2
Brian Raabe	7	9	2	.222	0	1
Tom Quinlan	4	6	0	.000	0	0

=== Pitching ===
==== Starting pitchers ====
Note: G = Games pitched; IP = Innings pitched; W = Wins; L = Losses; ERA = Earned run average; SO = Strikeouts

Player	G	IP	W	L	ERA	SO
Brad Radke	35	232.0	11	16	4.46	148
Frank Rodriguez	38	206.2	13	14	5.05	110
Rich Robertson	36	186.1	7	17	5.12	114
Scott Aldred	25	122.0	6	5	5.09	75
Rick Aguilera	19	111.1	8	6	5.42	83
Travis Miller	7	26.1	1	2	9.23	15
LaTroy Hawkins	7	26.1	1	1	8.20	24
Dan Serafini	1	4.1	0	1	10.38	1

==== Other pitchers ====
Note: G = Games pitched; IP = Innings pitched; W = Wins; L = Losses; ERA = Earned run average; SO = Strikeouts

Player	G	IP	W	L	ERA	SO
José Parra	27	70.0	5	5	6.04	50
Pat Mahomes	20	45.0	1	4	7.20	30
Scott Klingenbeck	10	28.2	1	1	7.85	15

==== Relief pitchers ====
Note: G = Games pitched; W = Wins; L = Losses; SV = Saves; ERA = Earned run average; SO = Strikeouts

Player	G	W	L	SV	ERA	SO
Dave Stevens	49	3	3	11	4.66	29
Eddie Guardado	83	6	5	4	5.25	74
Greg Hansell	50	3	0	3	5.69	46
Dan Naulty	49	3	2	4	3.79	56
Mike Trombley	43	5	1	6	3.01	57
Mike Milchin	26	2	1	0	8.31	19
Erik Bennett	24	2	0	1	7.90	13

== Miscellaneous ==
- The lone representative of the Twins in the All-Star Game was second baseman Chuck Knoblauch.
- The highest paid Twin in 1996 was Chuck Knoblauch at $4,670,000; followed by Rick Aguilera at $3,500,000.

== Other post-season awards ==
- Calvin R. Griffith Award (Most Valuable Twin) – Chuck Knoblauch
- Joseph W. Haynes Award (Twins Pitcher of the Year) – Frank Rodriguez
- Bill Boni Award (Twins Outstanding Rookie) – Ron Coomer
- Charles O. Johnson Award (Most Improved Twin) – Rich Becker
- Dick Siebert Award (Upper Midwest Player of the Year) – Paul Molitor
  - The above awards are voted on by the Twin Cities chapter of the BBWAA
- Carl R. Pohlad Award (Outstanding Community Service) – Paul Molitor
- Sherry Robertson Award (Twins Outstanding Farm System Player) – Todd Walker

Designated Hitter Paul Molitor earned the Silver Slugger Award

Outfielder Kirby Puckett won the Roberto Clemente Award, given annually to the Major League Baseball (MLB) player who "best exemplifies the game of baseball, sportsmanship, community involvement and the individual's contribution to his team", as voted on by baseball fans and members of the media.

== Farm system ==
Level	Team	League	Manager
AAA	Salt Lake Buzz	Pacific Coast League	Phil Roof
AA	Hardware City Rock Cats	Eastern League	Al Newman
A	Fort Myers Miracle	Florida State League	John Russell
A	Fort Wayne Wizards	Midwest League	Dan Rohn
Rookie	Elizabethton Twins	Appalachian League	Jose Marzan
Rookie	GCL Twins	Gulf Coast League	Mike Boulanger
