= Damon Buford =

American baseball player (born 1970)

- Center fielder
- Born: June 12, 1970 (age 54); Baltimore, Maryland, U.S.
- Batted: Right Threw: Right

MLB debut
- May 4, 1993, for the Baltimore Orioles

Last MLB appearance
- May 15, 2001, for the Chicago Cubs

MLB statistics
- Batting average: .242
- Home runs: 54
- Runs batted in: 218
- Stats at Baseball Reference

Teams
- Baltimore Orioles (1993–1995); New York Mets (1995); Texas Rangers (1996–1997); Boston Red Sox (1998–1999); Chicago Cubs (2000–2001)

Damon Jackson Buford (born June 12, 1970) is an American former professional baseball center fielder. He played for the Baltimore Orioles, New York Mets, Texas Rangers, Boston Red Sox and the Chicago Cubs of Major League Baseball (MLB) between 1993 and 2001. Buford batted and threw right-handed.

== Career ==
=== College career ===
Buford played at the University of Southern California. His Trojan teammates included Bret Barberie, Bret Boone, Jay Hemond, and Jeff Cirillo. In 1989 and 1990, he played collegiate summer baseball with the Cotuit Kettleers of the Cape Cod Baseball League.

=== Notable trades ===
- In the winter of 1992, he played in the Australian Baseball League with the Perth Heat.
- On July 28, 1995, Buford was traded by the Orioles with Alex Ochoa to the Mets for a player to be named later and Bobby Bonilla. The Mets sent Jimmy Williams, a minor leaguer to complete the trade.
- On January 25, 1996, he was traded by the Mets to the Rangers for Terrell Lowery.
- On November 6, 1997, he was traded by the Rangers with Jim Leyritz to the Red Sox for Mark Brandenburg, Bill Haselman, and Aaron Sele.
- On December 12, 1999, he was traded by the Red Sox to the Cubs for Manny Alexander.

=== Personal life ===
Born in Baltimore, Buford grew up in Los Angeles and attended Birmingham High School. His father Don Buford also played for the USC Trojans and in the MLB and later worked as hitting coordinator of the Hannibal Cavemen, a collegiate summer team, under manager Jay Hemond, who played at USC while Don was hitting coach.

== See also ==
- List of second-generation Major League Baseball players
