= 1996 Cleveland Indians season =

1996 Cleveland Indians
- American League Central champions
- League: American League
- Division: Central
- Ballpark: Jacobs Field
- City: Cleveland, Ohio
- Record: 99–62 (.615)
- Divisional place: 1st
- Owners: Richard Jacobs
- General managers: John Hart
- Managers: Mike Hargrove
- Television: WUAB; Jack Corrigan, Mike Hegan; SportsChannel; John Sanders, Rick Manning
- Radio: WKNR (1220 AM); Herb Score, Tom Hamilton, Matt Underwood

The 1996 Cleveland Indians season was the 96th season for the franchise and the third season at Jacobs Field. For the second consecutive season, the Indians had the best record in Major League Baseball. This was the first time in franchise history that the Indians had accomplished that feat. Between May 30 and August 19, the Indians hit at least one double in each of 75 games, the longest such streak in MLB since 1901.

== Offseason ==
- November 9, 1995: Rubén Amaro Jr. was released by the Cleveland Indians.
- December 6, 1995: Casey Candaele was signed as a free agent with the Cleveland Indians.
- December 7, 1995: Julio Franco was signed as a free agent with the Cleveland Indians.
- December 14, 1995: Jack McDowell signed as a free agent with the Cleveland Indians.
- January 4, 1996: Mario Díaz was signed as a free agent with the Cleveland Indians.
- March 31, 1996: Mark Clark was traded by the Cleveland Indians to the New York Mets for Reid Cornelius and Ryan Thompson.

== Regular season ==
The Indians had a formidable offensive lineup. They led the Majors in hits (1,665), batting average (.293), on-base percentage (.369). They also struck out an MLB-low 844 times.

=== Season standings ===
AL Central
Team	W	L	Pct.	GB	Home	Road
Cleveland Indians	99	62	.615	—	51‍–‍29	48‍–‍33
Chicago White Sox	85	77	.525	14½	44‍–‍37	41‍–‍40
Milwaukee Brewers	80	82	.494	19½	38‍–‍43	42‍–‍39
Minnesota Twins	78	84	.481	21½	39‍–‍43	39‍–‍41
Kansas City Royals	75	86	.466	24	37‍–‍43	38‍–‍43

=== Record vs. opponents ===
1996 American League record Source: MLB Standings Grid – 1996
Team	BAL	BOS	CAL	CWS	CLE	DET	KC	MIL	MIN	NYY	OAK	SEA	TEX	TOR
Baltimore	—	7–6	6–6	4–8	5–7	11–2	9–3	9–3	7–5	3–10	9–4	7–5	3–10–1	8–5
Boston	6–7	—	8–4	6–6	1–11	12–1	3–9	7–5	6–6	7–6	8–5	7–6	6–6	8–5
California	6–6	4–8	—	6–6	4–9	6–6	4–8	7–5	4–8	7–6	6–7	5–8	4–9	7–5
Chicago	8–4	6–6	6–6	—	5–8	10–3	7–6	6–7	6–7	6–7	5–7	5–7	8–4	7–5
Cleveland	7–5	11–1	9–4	8–5	—	12–0	7–6	7–6	10–3	3–9	6–6	8–4	4–8	7–5
Detroit	2–11	1–12	6–6	3–10	0–12	—	6–6	4–8	6–6	5–8	4–8	6–6	4–9	6–7
Kansas City	3–9	9–3	8–4	6–7	6–7	6–6	—	4–9	6–7	4–8	5–7	7–5	6–6	5–8
Milwaukee	3–9	5–7	5–7	7–6	6–7	8–4	9–4	—	9–4	6–6	7–5	4–9	6–7	5–7
Minnesota	5–7	6–6	8–4	7–6	3–10	6–6	7–6	4–9	—	5–7	6–7	6–6	7–5	8–5
New York	10–3	6–7	6–7	7–6	9–3	8–5	8–4	6–6	7–5	—	9–3	3–9	5–7	8–5
Oakland	4–9	5–8	7–6	7–5	6–6	8–4	7–5	5–7	7–6	3–9	—	8–5	7–6	4–8
Seattle	5–7	6–7	8–5	7–5	4–8	6–6	5–7	9–4	6–6	9–3	5–8	—	10–3	5–7
Texas	10–3–1	6–6	9–4	4–8	8–4	9–4	6–6	7–6	5–7	7–5	6–7	3–10	—	10–2
Toronto	5–8	5–8	5–7	5–7	5–7	7–6	8–5	7–5	5–8	5–8	8–4	7–5	2–10	—

=== Game log ===
1996 Game Log: 99–62 (Home: 51–29; Away: 48–33)
April: 16–8 (Home: 8–3; Away: 8–5)

#	Date	Opponent	Score	Win	Loss	Save	Attendance	Record
1	April 2	Yankees	1–7	Cone	**Martinez** (0–1)	—	42,289	0–1
2	April 3	Yankees	1–5	Pettitte	**McDowell** (0–1)	Nelson	41,843	0–2
3	April 5	Blue Jays	1–7	Guzman	**Hershiser** (0–1)	—	41,782	0–3
4	April 6	Blue Jays	5–3	**Nagy** (1–0)	Hanson	**Mesa** (1)	41,852	1–3
5	April 7	Blue Jays	8–3	**Martinez** (1–1)	Quantrill	—	41,689	2–3
6	April 10	@ Orioles	2–3 (10)	Orosco	**Tavarez** (0–1)	—	45,097	2–4
7	April 11	@ Orioles	4–14	Erickson	**Hershiser** (0–2)	Rhodes	43,189	2–5
8	April 12	@ Red Sox	3–1	**Nagy** (2–0)	Sele	**Mesa** (2)	26,703	3–5
9	April 13	@ Red Sox	14–2	**Martinez** (2–1)	Moyer	—	31,827	4–5
10	April 14	@ Red Sox	7–6 (11)	**Tavarez** (1–1)	Stanton	**Mesa** (3)	31,796	5–5
11	April 15	@ Red Sox	8–0	**McDowell** (1–1)	Wakefield	—	32,861	6–5
12	April 16	@ Twins	7–2	**Hershiser** (1–2)	Radke	—	13,103	7–5
13	April 17	@ Twins	8–9	Hansell	**Shuey** (0–1)	Stevens	11,276	7–6
14	April 19	Red Sox	9–4	**Martinez** (3–1)	Gordon	—	40,521	8–6
15	April 20	Red Sox	2–1	**McDowell** (2–1)	Wakefield	**Mesa** (4)	40,498	9–6
16	April 21	Red Sox	11–7	**Ogea** (1–0)	Pennington	—	42,256	10–6
17	April 22	Orioles	6–3	**Nagy** (3–0)	Erickson	**Mesa** (5)	42,236	11–6
18	April 23	Orioles	9–8	**Ogea** (2–0)	Mussina	**Mesa** (6)	40,770	12–6
19	April 24	@ Yankees	8–10	Kamieniecki	**Martinez** (3–2)	—	20,187	12–7
20	April 25	@ Yankees	4–3	**Poole** (1–0)	Pettitte	**Mesa** (7)	18,580	13–7
21	April 26	@ Blue Jays	6–3	**Hershiser** (2–2)	Hanson	**Mesa** (8)	30,227	14–7
22	April 27	@ Blue Jays	6–11	Castillo	**Nagy** (3–1)	—	40,140	14–8
23	April 28	@ Blue Jays	17–3	**Lopez** (1–0)	Viola	—	31,143	15–8
24	April 30	White Sox	5–3	**Martinez** (4–2)	Tapani	**Mesa** (9)	40,268	16–8

May: 19–9 (Home: 8–2; Away: 11–7)

#	Date	Opponent	Score	Win	Loss	Save	Attendance	Record
25	May 1	White Sox	9–5	**McDowell** (3–1)	McCaskill	**Plunk** (1)	40,447	17–8
26	May 2	@ Mariners	6–4	**Hershiser** (3–2)	Wolcott	**Mesa** (10)	21,711	18–8
27	May 3	@ Mariners	5–2	**Nagy** (4–1)	Hitchcock	**Mesa** (11)	38,086	19–8
28	May 4	@ Mariners	1–5	Menhart	**Lopez** (1–1)	—	57,133	19–9
29	May 5	@ Mariners	2–0	**Martinez** (5–2)	Bosio	**Mesa** (12)	56,883	20–9
30	May 6	@ Athletics	3–5	Taylor	**Assenmacher** (0–1)	Mohler	47,313	20–10
31	May 7	@ Athletics	4–8	Johns	**Hershiser** (3–3)	—	10,126	20–11
32	May 8	@ Athletics	7–3	**Nagy** (5–1)	Reyes	—	9,288	21–11
33	May 10	@ Angels	8–13	Boskie	**Lopez** (1–2)	—	23,522	21–12
34	May 11	@ Angels	6–5	**McDowell** (4–1)	Sanderson	**Mesa** (13)	32,102	22–12
35	May 12	@ Angels	4–1	**Poole** (2–0)	Percival	**Mesa** (14)	22,768	23–12
36	May 14	Tigers	5–1	**Nagy** (6–1)	Gohr	—	40,765	24–12
37	May 15	Tigers	5–2	**Martinez** (6–2)	Lima	**Mesa** (15)	42,259	25–12
38	May 16	Tigers	8–3	**McDowell** (5–1)	Williams	—	42,330	26–12
39	May 17	Rangers	12–10	**Embree** (1–0)	Heredia	**Mesa** (16)	41,225	27–12
40	May 18	Rangers	3–6	Oliver	**Anderson** (0–1)	Henneman	40,973	27–13
41	May 19	Rangers	8–5	**Nagy** (7–1)	Witt	**Mesa** (17)	43,299	28–13
42	May 21	Brewers	6–5	**Tavarez** (2–1)	Boze	—	39,974	29–13
43	May 22	Brewers	8–10	Karl	**McDowell** (5–2)	Fetters	41,027	29–14
44	May 23	Brewers	5–1	**Hershiser** (4–3)	Miranda	—	42,395	30–14
45	May 24	@ Tigers	6–3	**Plunk** (1–0)	Veres	**Mesa** (18)	26,967	31–14
46	May 25	@ Tigers	7–6	**Nagy** (8–1)	Lewis	**Mesa** (19)	41,527	32–14
47	May 26	@ Tigers	5–0	**Martinez** (7–2)	Williams	—	39,056	33–14
48	May 27	@ Rangers	2–3	Pavlik	**McDowell** (5–3)	—	46,521	33–15
49	May 28	@ Rangers	3–11	Oliver	**Hershiser** (4–4)	—	35,727	33–16
50	May 29	@ Rangers	4–5	Cook	**Tavarez** (2–2)	Henneman	35,893	33–17
51	May 30	@ Brewers	2–0	**Nagy** (9–1)	Bones	**Mesa** (20)	11,543	34–17
52	May 31	@ Brewers	10–4	**Martinez** (8–2)	McDonald	—	24,050	35–17

June: 14–14 (Home: 8–8; Away: 6–6)

#	Date	Opponent	Score	Win	Loss	Save	Attendance	Record
53	June 1	@ Brewers	1–2	Garcia	**McDowell** (5–4)	Fetters	22,004	35–18
54	June 2	@ Brewers	11–6	**Poole** (3–0)	Karl	—	21,150	36–18
55	June 4	Mariners	7–10	Carmona	**Mesa** (0–1)	Charlton	42,179	36–19
56	June 5	Mariners	13–5	**Plunk** (2–0)	Milacki	—	42,274	37–19
57	June 6	Mariners	2–5	Wells	**Martinez** (8–3)	Charlton	42,236	37–20
58	June 7	Angels	4–3	**McDowell** (6–4)	Boskie	**Mesa** (21)	42,260	38–20
59	June 8	Angels	5–0	**Hershiser** (5–4)	Finley	—	42,267	39–20
60	June 9	Angels	6–8 (13)	Hancock	**Tavarez** (2–3)	—	42,237	39–21
61	June 10	Athletics	5–4	**Nagy** (10–1)	Johns	**Mesa** (22)	42,167	40–21
62	June 11	Athletics	6–5 (13)	**Ogea** (3–0)	Reyes	—	42,249	41–21
63	June 12	Athletics	6–9	Montgomery	**McDowell** (6–5)	Mohler	40,673	41–22
64	June 13	@ Yankees	6–2	**Hershiser** (6–4)	Rogers	**Shuey** (1)	30,707	42–22
65	June 14	@ Yankees	3–4	Gooden	**Ogea** (3–1)	Wetteland	32,580	42–23
66	June 15	@ Yankees	10–3	**Nagy** (11–1)	Boehringer	—	42,032	43–23
67	June 16	@ Yankees	4–5	Pettitte	**Martinez** (8–4)	Wetteland	51,180	43–24
68	June 18	Red Sox	9–7	**Swindell** (1–0)	Sele	**Mesa** (23)	42,209	44–24
69	June 19	Red Sox	11–4	**Hershiser** (7–4)	Gordon	—	42,276	45–24
70	June 20	Red Sox	5–4	**Shuey** (1–1)	Stanton	—	42,306	46–24
71	June 21	Yankees	7–8 (10)	Nelson	**Mesa** (0–2)	Wetteland	42,176	46–25
72	June 21	Yankees	3–9	Mendoza	**Tavarez** (2–4)	—	42,454	46–26
73	June 22	Yankees	9–11	Brewer	**Martinez** (8–5)	Wetteland	42,461	46–27
74	June 23	Yankees	5–6	Gooden	**McDowell** (6–6)	Wetteland	41,767	46–28
75	June 25	@ Red Sox	4–0	**Hershiser** (8–4)	Gordon	—	33,576	47–28
76	June 26	@ Red Sox	4–6 (15)	Garces	**Embree** (1–1)	—	33,727	47–29
77	June 27	@ White Sox	10–15	Fernandez	**Swindell** (1–1)	—	27,782	47–30
78	June 28	@ White Sox	2–4	Baldwin	**Tavarez** (2–5)	Hernandez	33,136	47–31
79	June 29	@ White Sox	3–2 (10)	**Shuey** (2–1)	Karchner	—	43,601	48–31
80	June 30	@ White Sox	4–2	**Hershiser** (9–4)	Tapani	**Mesa** (24)	30,351	49–31

July: 16–11 (Home: 7–6; Away: 9–5)

#	Date	Opponent	Score	Win	Loss	Save	Attendance	Record
81	July 1	Royals	2–4	Haney	**Nagy** (11–2)	—	40,814	49–32
82	July 2	Royals	3–2	**Poole** (4–0)	Belcher	—	42,283	50–32
83	July 3	Royals	6–4	**Tavarez** (3–5)	Magnante	**Shuey** (2)	42,470	51–32
84	July 4	White Sox	5–6 (10)	Karchner	**Mesa** (0–3)	Hernandez	42,355	51–33
85	July 5	White Sox	0–7	Alvarez	**Hershiser** (9–5)	—	42,536	51–34
86	July 6	White Sox	2–3	Karchner	**Shuey** (2–2)	Hernandez	42,454	51–35
87	July 7	White Sox	6–1	**Ogea** (4–1)	Fernandez	**Assenmacher** (1)	42,343	52–35
88	July 11	@ Twins	11–7	**McDowell** (7–6)	Radke	—	16,438	53–35
89	July 12	@ Twins	7–5	**Mesa** (1–3)	Stevens	**Shuey** (3)	18,246	54–35
90	July 13	@ Twins	19–11	**Ogea** (5–1)	Aguilera	—	31,552	55–35
91	July 14	@ Twins	4–5	Guardado	**Plunk** (2–1)	—	25,312	55–36
92	July 15	@ Royals	3–6	Magnante	**Tavarez** (3–6)	Montgomery	22,294	55–37
93	July 16	@ Royals	10–4	**McDowell** (8–6)	Haney	—	16,871	56–37
94	July 17	@ Royals	2–3	Belcher	**Hershiser** (9–6)	Montgomery	19,532	56–38
95	July 18	Twins	5–4	**Graves** (1–0)	Guardado	—	40,934	57–38
96	July 19	Twins	2–3	Rodriguez	**Nagy** (11–3)	Naulty	42,373	57–39
97	July 20	Twins	6–5 (11)	**Shuey** (3–2)	Stevens	—	43,433	58–39
98	July 21	Twins	7–5	**McDowell** (9–6)	Radke	**Shuey** (4)	42,341	59–39
99	July 22	@ Blue Jays	4–2	**Hershiser** (10–6)	Hanson	**Mesa** (25)	35,517	60–39
100	July 23	@ Blue Jays	1–3	Hentgen	**Ogea** (5–2)	Timlin	35,194	60–40
101	July 24	@ Blue Jays	10–0	**Martinez** (9–5)	Janzen	—	35,218	61–40
102	July 25	@ Orioles	10–7	**Nagy** (12–3)	Coppinger	—	47,025	62–40
103	July 26	@ Orioles	14–9	**Assenmacher** (1–1)	Mussina	—	46,751	63–40
104	July 27	@ Orioles	2–14	Wells	**Hershiser** (10–7)	—	47,360	63–41
105	July 28	@ Orioles	6–3 (13)	**Mesa** (2–3)	Stephenson	—	46,273	64–41
106	July 30	Blue Jays	1–3	Flener	**Martinez** (9–6)	Timlin	42,355	64–42
107	July 31	Blue Jays	4–2	**Assenmacher** (2–1)	Timlin	—	42,301	65–42

August: 15–13 (Home: 7–7; Away: 8–6)

#	Date	Opponent	Score	Win	Loss	Save	Attendance	Record
108	August 1	Blue Jays	3–5	Hanson	**Lopez** (1–3)	Timlin	42,249	65–43
109	August 2	Orioles	11–1	**Hershiser** (11–7)	Erickson	—	42,465	66–43
110	August 3	Orioles	4–9	Orosco	**Ogea** (5–3)	—	42,448	66–44
111	August 4	Orioles	14–2	**Anderson** (1–1)	Coppinger	—	42,349	67–44
112	August 5	Orioles	10–13	Wells	**Assenmacher** (2–2)	—	40,863	67–45
113	August 6	@ Mariners	4–3	**Lopez** (2–3)	Wells	**Mesa** (26)	31,472	68–45
114	August 7	@ Mariners	5–4	**Tavarez** (4–6)	Charlton	**Mesa** (27)	30,431	69–45
115	August 8	@ Mariners	2–1	**Ogea** (6–3)	Mulholland	**Mesa** (28)	36,822	70–45
116	August 9	@ Athletics	10–4	**McDowell** (10–6)	Telgheder	—	20,122	71–45
117	August 10	@ Athletics	1–5	Adams	**Nagy** (12–4)	—	30,238	71–46
118	August 11	@ Athletics	3–9	Wasdin	**Lopez** (2–4)	—	21,914	71–47
119	August 12	@ Angels	5–4	**Hershiser** (12–7)	Finley	**Mesa** (29)	19,499	72–47
120	August 13	@ Angels	2–4	Boskie	**Ogea** (6–4)	Percival	19,569	72–48
121	August 14	@ Angels	7–8	Gohr	**McDowell** (10–7)	Percival	23,887	72–49
122	August 16	Tigers	3–1 (12)	**Assenmacher** (3–2)	Lewis	—	42,485	73–49
123	August 17	Tigers	6–3	**Hershiser** (13–7)	Thompson	**Mesa** (30)	42,511	74–49
124	August 18	Tigers	11–3	**Ogea** (7–4)	Williams	—	42,337	75–49
125	August 19	Rangers	3–10	Pavlik	**McDowell** (10–8)	—	42,393	75–50
126	August 20	Rangers	10–4	**Lopez** (3–4)	Witt	—	42,370	76–50
127	August 21	Rangers	8–10 (10)	Vosberg	**Tavarez** (4–7)	—	42,345	76–51
128	August 23	Brewers	5–6 (11)	Jones	**Mesa** (2–4)	Fetters	42,405	76–52
129	August 24	Brewers	3–4 (10)	Wickman	**Plunk** (2–2)	Fetters	42,437	76–53
130	August 25	Brewers	8–5	**Shuey** (4–2)	Miranda	**Mesa** (31)	42,335	77–53
131	August 26	@ Tigers	2–1	**Nagy** (13–4)	Lira	—	22,349	78–53
132	August 27	@ Tigers	12–2	**Lopez** (4–4)	Thompson	—	19,602	79–53
133	August 28	@ Tigers	9–3	**Hershiser** (14–7)	Sager	—	21,091	80–53
134	August 30	@ Rangers	3–5	Pavlik	**Ogea** (7–5)	Russell	40,383	80–54
135	August 31	@ Rangers	3–6	Oliver	**McDowell** (10–9)	Vosberg	46,319	80–55

September: 19–7 (Home: 13–3; Away: 6–4)

#	Date	Opponent	Score	Win	Loss	Save	Attendance	Record
136	September 1	@ Rangers	8–2	**Nagy** (14–4)	Burkett	—	46,084	81–55
137	September 2	@ Brewers	6–7	Jones	**Mesa** (2–5)	—	18,015	81–56
138	September 3	@ Brewers	2–8	Karl	**Hershiser** (14–8)	—	10,599	81–57
139	September 4	@ Brewers	7–0	**Ogea** (8–5)	D'Amico	—	12,666	82–57
140	September 8	Mariners	2–1	**Nagy** (15–4)	Mulholland	—	42,307	83–57
141	September 8	Mariners	5–6	Charlton	**Mesa** (2–6)	—	42,217	83–58
142	September 9	Angels	4–3	**Shuey** (5–2)	Holtz	**Mesa** (32)	42,208	84–58
143	September 10	Angels	7–5	**Assenmacher** (4–2)	Percival	—	42,181	85–58
144	September 11	Angels	2–0	**McDowell** (11–9)	Finley	**Mesa** (33)	42,264	86–58
145	September 12	Angels	11–2	**Anderson** (2–1)	Boskie	—	42,244	87–58
146	September 14	Athletics	9–2	**Nagy** (16–4)	Wengert	—	—	88–58
147	September 14	Athletics	9–8	**Plunk** (3–2)	Small	**Mesa** (34)	42,233	89–58
148	September 15	Athletics	9–10 (10)	Reyes	**Mesa** (2–7)	—	42,226	89–59
149	September 16	@ White Sox	4–3	**McDowell** (12–9)	Alvarez	—	25,392	90–59
150	September 17	@ White Sox	9–4	**Anderson** (3–1)	Fernandez	**Plunk** (2)	18,763	91–59
151	September 18	@ White Sox	4–3	**Lopez** (5–4)	Baldwin	**Mesa** (35)	20,289	92–59
152	September 19	Royals	9–1	**Ogea** (9–5)	Appier	—	42,297	93–59
153	September 20	Royals	4–6	Bevil	**Nagy** (16–5)	Bluma	42,358	93–60
154	September 21	Royals	13–4	**Hershiser** (15–8)	Rosado	—	42,339	94–60
155	September 22	Royals	6–5	**McDowell** (13–9)	Jacome	**Mesa** (36)	42,291	95–60
156	September 23	Twins	7–6	**Graves** (2–0)	Parra	**Mesa** (37)	42,299	96–60
157	September 24	Twins	7–5	**Ogea** (10–5)	Rodriguez	**Mesa** (38)	42,272	97–60
158	September 25	Twins	6–3	**Nagy** (17–5)	Robertson	—	42,469	98–60
159	September 27	@ Royals	6–11	Rosado	**Hershiser** (15–9)	—	15,939	98–61
160	September 28	@ Royals	5–4	**Mercker** (1–0)	Scanlan	**Mesa** (39)	19,820	99–61
161	September 29	@ Royals	1–4	Belcher	**Ogea** (10–6)	Pichardo	14,556	99–62

Legend: = Win = Loss
Bold = Indians team member

=== Detailed records ===
American League
Opponent	W	L	WP	RS	RA
AL East
Baltimore Orioles	7	5	0.583	92	86
Boston Red Sox	11	1	0.917	87	42
Detroit Tigers	12	0	1.000	79	28
New York Yankees	3	9	0.250	61	73
Toronto Blue Jays	7	5	0.583	66	45
Total	40	20	0.667	385	274
AL Central
Chicago White Sox	8	5	0.615	63	58
**Cleveland Indians**					
Kansas City Royals	7	6	0.538	70	58
Milwaukee Brewers	7	6	0.538	74	58
Minnesota Twins	10	3	0.769	96	70
Total	32	20	0.615	303	244
AL West
California Angels	9	4	0.692	71	56
Oakland Athletics	6	6	0.500	72	72
Seattle Mariners	8	4	0.667	54	46
Texas Rangers	4	8	0.333	67	77
Total	27	22	0.551	264	251
Season Total	99	62	0.615	952	769

Month	Games	Won	Lost	Win %	RS	RA
April	24	16	8	0.667	152	118
May	28	19	9	0.679	154	126
June	28	14	14	0.500	165	149
July	27	16	11	0.593	152	128
August	28	15	13	0.536	167	135
September	26	19	7	0.731	162	113
Total	161	99	62	0.615	952	769

	Games	Won	Lost	Win %	RS	RA
Home	80	51	29	0.638	488	389
Away	81	48	33	0.593	464	380
Total	161	99	62	0.615	952	769

=== Notable transactions ===
- May 14, 1996: Greg Cadaret was signed as a free agent with the Cleveland Indians.
- June 15, 1996: Greg Swindell signed as a free agent with the Cleveland Indians.

=== Roster ===
1996 Cleveland Indians
**Roster**
**Pitchers**: 34 Brian Anderson; 45 Paul Assenmacher; 56 Alan Embree; 35 Danny Graves; 55 Orel Hershiser; 59 Albie Lopez; 32 Dennis Martínez; 29 Jack McDowell; 39 Kent Mercker; 49 José Mesa; 41 Charles Nagy; 37 Chad Ogea; 38 Eric Plunk; 62 Jim Poole; 47 Joe Roa; 53 Paul Shuey; 12 Greg Swindell; 50 Julián Tavárez	**Catchers**: 15 Sandy Alomar Jr.; 2 Einar Díaz; 17 Tony Peña; **Infielders**: 9 Carlos Baerga; 26 Casey Candaele; 4 Mark Carreon; 10 Álvaro Espinoza; 23 Julio Franco; 9 Damian Jackson; 12 Jeff Kent; 30 Scott Leius; 33 Eddie Murray; 27 Gerónimo Peña; 36 Herbert Perry; 20 Kevin Seitzer; 25 Jim Thome; 10 José Vizcaíno; 13 Omar Vizquel	**Outfielders**: 8 Albert Belle; 20 Jeromy Burnitz; 22 Brian Giles; 35 Wayne Kirby; 7 Kenny Lofton; 24 Manny Ramírez; 46 Ryan Thompson; 48 Nigel Wilson	**Manager**: 21 Mike Hargrove; **Coaches**: 11 Toby Harrah (Bench); 6 Luis Isaac (Bullpen); 42 Charlie Manuel (Hitting); 1 Dave Nelson (First Base); 29 Jeff Newman (Third Base); 28 Mark Wiley (Pitching); 43 Dan Williams (Bullpen Catcher)

== Player stats ==
= Indicates team leader

= Indicates league leader

=== Batting ===
==== Starters by position ====
Note: Pos = Position; G = Games played; AB = At bats; H = Hits; Avg. = Batting average; HR = Home runs; RBI = Runs batted in

Pos	Player	G	AB	H	Avg.	HR	RBI
C	Sandy Alomar Jr.	127	418	110	.263	11	50
1B	Julio Franco	112	432	139	.322	14	76
2B	Carlos Baerga	100	424	113	.267	10	55
SS	Omar Vizquel	151	542	161	.297	9	64
3B	Jim Thome	151	505	157	.311	38	116
LF	Albert Belle	158	602	187	.311	48	148
CF	Kenny Lofton	154	662	210	.317	14	67
RF	Manny Ramirez	152	550	170	.309	33	112
DH	Eddie Murray	88	336	88	.262	12	45

==== Other batters ====
Note: G = Games played; AB = At bats; H = Hits; Avg. = Batting average; HR = Home runs; RBI = Runs batted in

Player	G	AB	H	Avg.	HR	RBI
José Vizcaíno	48	179	51	.285	0	13
Tony Peña	67	174	34	.195	1	27
Mark Carreon	38	142	46	.324	2	14
Jeromy Burnitz	71	128	36	.281	7	26
Brian Giles	51	121	43	.355	5	27
Álvaro Espinoza	59	112	25	.223	4	11
Jeff Kent	39	102	27	.265	3	16
Kevin Seitzer	22	83	32	.386	1	16
Casey Candaele	24	44	11	.250	1	4
Scott Leius	27	43	6	.140	1	3
Ryan Thompson	8	22	7	.318	1	5
Wayne Kirby	27	16	4	.250	0	1
Nigel Wilson	10	12	3	.250	2	5
Herbert Perry	7	12	1	.083	0	0
Damian Jackson	5	10	3	.300	0	1
Gerónimo Peña	5	9	1	.111	1	2
Einar Díaz	4	1	0	.000	0	0

=== Pitching ===
==== Starting pitchers ====
Note: G = Games pitched; IP = Innings pitched; W = Wins; L = Losses; ERA = Earned run average; SO = Strikeouts

Player	G	IP	W	L	ERA	SO
Charles Nagy	32	222.0	17	5	3.41	167
Orel Hershiser	33	206.0	15	9	4.24	125
Jack McDowell	30	192.0	13	9	5.11	141
Chad Ogea	29	146.2	10	6	4.79	101
Dennis Martínez	20	112.0	9	6	4.50	48
Brian Anderson	10	51.1	3	1	4.91	21

==== Other pitchers ====
Note: G = Games pitched; IP = Innings pitched; W = Wins; L = Losses; ERA = Earned run average; SO = Strikeouts

Player	G	IP	W	L	ERA	SO
Albie Lopez	13	62.0	5	4	6.39	45
Greg Swindell	13	28.2	1	1	6.59	21

==== Relief pitchers ====
Note: G = Games pitched; W = Wins; L = Losses; SV = Saves; ERA = Earned run average; SO = Strikeouts

Player	G	W	L	SV	ERA	SO
José Mesa	69	2	7	39	3.73	64
Paul Assenmacher	63	4	2	1	3.09	44
Eric Plunk	56	3	2	2	2.43	85
Julián Tavárez	51	4	7	0	5.36	46
Paul Shuey	42	5	2	4	2.85	44
Jim Poole	32	4	0	0	3.04	19
Alan Embree	24	1	1	0	6.39	33
Danny Graves	15	2	0	0	4.55	22
Kent Mercker	10	1	0	0	3.09	7
Joe Roa	1	0	0	0	10.80	0

== Award winners ==
- Omar Vizquel, Hutch Award

All-Star Game

== Postseason ==
=== Game log ===
1996 Postseason Game Log
American League Division Series

#	Date	Opponent	Score	Win	Loss	Save	Stadium	Attendance	Record
1	October 1	@ Orioles	4–10	Wells (1–0)	**Nagy** (0–1)	—	Oriole Park at Camden Yards	47,644	0–1
2	October 2	@ Orioles	4–7	Benitez (1–0)	**Plunk** (0–1)	Myers (1)	Oriole Park at Camden Yards	48,970	0–2
3	October 4	Orioles	9–4	**Assenmacher** (1–0)	Orosco (0–1)	—	**Jacobs Field**	44,250	1–2
4	October 5	Orioles	3–4 (12)	Benitez (2–0)	**Mesa** (0–1)	Myers (2)	**Jacobs Field**	44,280	1–3

Legend: = Win = Loss = Postponement
Bold = Indians team member

== Minor league affiliates ==
Classification level	Team	League	Season article
AAA	Buffalo Bisons	International League	1996 Buffalo Bisons season
AA	Canton–Akron Indians	Eastern League	1996 Canton–Akron Indians season
Advanced A	Kinston Indians	Carolina League	
A	Columbus RedStixx	South Atlantic League	
Short Season A	Watertown Indians	New York–Penn League	
Rookie	Burlington Indians	Appalachian League	
