= Bill Haselman =

American baseball player and coach (born 1966)

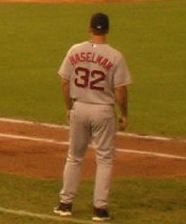
- Haselman with the Boston Red Sox in 2006

Cincinnati Reds – No. 73
- Catcher / Coach
- Born: May 25, 1966 (age 59); Long Branch, New Jersey, U.S.
- Batted: Right Threw: Right

MLB debut
- September 3, 1990, for the Texas Rangers

Last MLB appearance
- September 27, 2003, for the Boston Red Sox

MLB statistics
- Batting average: .259
- Home runs: 47
- Runs batted in: 210
- Stats at Baseball Reference

Teams
- As player: Texas Rangers (1990); Seattle Mariners (1992–1994); Boston Red Sox (1995–1997); Texas Rangers (1998); Detroit Tigers (1999); Texas Rangers (2000–2002); Boston Red Sox (2003); As coach: Boston Red Sox (2004–2006); Los Angeles Angels (2022–2023); Cincinnati Reds (2026–present)

Career highlights and awards
- World Series champion (2004)

William Joseph Haselman (born May 25, 1966) is an American professional baseball coach and former player who currently serves as the catching coach for the Cincinnati Reds of Major League Baseball (MLB). He played as a catcher in MLB for 13 seasons between 1990 and 2003. A first-round selection in the 1987 MLB draft, he played for the Texas Rangers, Seattle Mariners, Boston Red Sox, and Detroit Tigers.

He previously was the bullpen coach and first base coach for the Red Sox and the third base coach for the Los Angeles Angels. He has also served as a manager in Minor League Baseball.

== Early life ==
Haselman was born in Long Branch, New Jersey, and graduated from Saratoga High School in Saratoga, California. At Saratoga, he played high school football in addition to baseball. He committed to play college football at the University of Nevada, Reno, but backed out in order to attend the University of California, Los Angeles (UCLA). There, he played for the UCLA Bruins baseball team as an understudy to Todd Zeile. He also played briefly for the UCLA Bruins football team—while some sources state he was a backup for starting quarterback Troy Aikman, Haselman has stated this is incorrect, as during his half-season with the team, the starting quarterback was David Norrie.

== Playing career ==
=== Texas Rangers ===
Haselman was drafted as the 23rd pick of the first round of the 1987 Major League Baseball draft by the Texas Rangers. He began his professional career that year for the Gastonia Rangers of the South Atlantic League. In 1988, he was promoted to the Port Charlotte Rangers of the Class A-Advanced Florida State League, where he hit .245 in 122 games.

Haselman spent 1989 and 1990 with the Double-A Tulsa Drillers of the Texas League. He was a September call-up with the Rangers in 1990 and made his MLB debut at the age of 24 as a pinch hitter on September 3, 1990, against the Cleveland Indians. He recorded his first hit, also as a pinch hitter, off Joe Klink of the Oakland Athletics on September 27. In 14 games, he had two hits in 13 at bats.

Haselman returned to the minors and spent 1991 and the first part of 1992 with the Oklahoma City 89ers of the Triple-A American Association.

=== Seattle Mariners ===
On May 29, 1992, Haselman was selected off waivers by the Seattle Mariners, who assigned him to the Calgary Cannons of the Pacific Coast League, where he hit .255 in 88 games with 19 home runs and 53 runs batted in (RBI). He also appeared in eight games for the Mariners in September and had five hits in 19 at bats.

Haselman spent most of 1993 as the Mariners back-up catcher and hit his first home run on May 8 off of Jim Deshaies of the Minnesota Twins. On June 6, 1993, Haselman was hit by a pitch thrown by Baltimore Orioles pitcher Mike Mussina, leading to him charging the mound and igniting a bench-clearing brawl. In parts of three seasons with Seattle, he appeared in 104 games and hit .234 with 6 home runs and 24 RBI.

=== Boston Red Sox ===
Haselman signed as a free agent with the Boston Red Sox on November 7, 1994, and played with the Red Sox through the 1997 season as a backup catcher. Haselman's most dramatic offensive performance came in a game at Fenway Park against the Toronto Blue Jays on June 27, 1995. With the bases empty and the score tied, 5–5, he pinch hit for catcher Mike Macfarlane in the bottom of the 11th inning. Haselman shattered his bat, sending a Woody Williams' offering sailing over the Green Monster to give the Red Sox their first walk-off win of their 1995 American League East division-winning campaign. Haselman's only postseason appearance was during the 1995 American League Division Series, when he played in one game against Cleveland and was hitless in two at bats.

Haselman had his best season in 1996, when he hit .274 with 8 home runs and 34 RBI in a career-high 237 at bats for the Red Sox. He also led American League catchers with a 7.64 range factor. Haselman was the battery-mate for Red Sox pitcher Roger Clemens on September 18, 1996, when Clemens struck out 20 batters in a game against the Detroit Tigers to tie his own major league single-game strikeout record in a nine-inning game. It was also a productive night for Haselman, who had three hits and two RBIs in the memorable Red Sox victory.

=== Texas Rangers (second stint) ===
The Red Sox traded Haselman (along with Mark Brandenburg and Aaron Sele) on November 6, 1997, to the Texas Rangers for Damon Buford and Jim Leyritz. In 40 games, he hit .314 with 6 home runs.

=== Detroit Tigers ===
Haselman signed as a free agent with the Detroit Tigers on December 14, 1998. With the 1999 Tigers, he hit .273 in 48 games. The Tigers traded Haselman back to the Rangers (along with Frank Catalanotto, Francisco Cordero, Gabe Kapler, Justin Thompson and a minor leaguer) on November 2, 1999, in exchange for Juan González, Danny Patterson and Gregg Zaun.

=== Texas Rangers (third stint) ===
Haselman remained with Texas from 2000 through 2002. He appeared in at least 47 MLB games during each of those seasons. Overall, in three stints spanning parts of five seasons with the Rangers, Haselman played in 225 games and hit .273.

=== Late career ===
Haselman rejoined the Tigers again on a free agent contract on January 20, 2003, but was released on March 27, before the season started.

Haselman was signed as a free agent by the Red Sox on April 11, 2003. In his second stint with Boston, he was hitless in three at bats in four games. He played in his final major league game on September 27, 2003. He also played in 79 games with the Triple-A Pawtucket Red Sox.

Haselman signed as a minor-league free agent with the Baltimore Orioles on December 3, 2003, but retired at the age of 37 before playing in any games.

=== Career statistics ===
In a thirteen-year major-league career, Haselman played in 589 games, accumulating 416 hits in 1,606 at bats for a .259 career batting average, along with 47 home runs, 210 RBI and a .311 on-base percentage. He had a .991 career fielding percentage as a catcher. While predominantly a catcher (524 games), Haselman also made appearances as a designated hitter (39 games), outfielder (six games), first baseman (three games), and third baseman (one game).

Haselman played in 783 minor-league games over 10 seasons, batting .269 with 95 home runs and 400 RBIs.

== Coaching and managing career ==
Haselman served as the Red Sox' interim first base coach in 2004, filling in for Lynn Jones from early May to late July, after Jones sustained a non-baseball eye injury. The team went on to win the World Series. Haselman served as the team's bullpen coach in 2005, and was first base coach for the 2006 season. Boston then offered him a manager position in the minor leagues, but Haselman declined, as he did not want to spend that much time away from his family.

In August 2009, Haselman was named a volunteer assistant coach, to work with catchers and act as first base coach, for the Washington Huskies baseball team, under head coach Lindsay Meggs.

In 2010, Haselman returned to professional baseball as manager of the Class A Bakersfield Blaze, a California League affiliate of the Texas Rangers. In 2011, the Red Sox hired Haselman to assist their minor-league catching instructor. The Los Angeles Angels of Anaheim named Haselman as the manager of the club's Inland Empire 66ers minor league team on January 9, 2012. In 2013, Haselman guided Inland Empire to a California League title.

Haselman joined the Los Angeles Dodgers organization in 2014 as the manager for the Great Lakes Loons of the Midwest League. In 2015, the Dodgers assigned Haselman to be the manager of the Rancho Cucamonga Quakes of the California League. He led them to a 78–62 record and the team's first California League championship since 1994. In 2016, Haselman became the manager of the Oklahoma City Dodgers in the Triple-A Pacific Coast League (PCL). That season, the team compiled an 81–60 record and advanced to the championship series of the PCL. He remained with the team as their manager through the 2018 season.

Following cancellation of the 2020 minor-league season, Heselman returned to Oklahoma City as bench coach and third base coach for the 2021 season.

Haselman joined the Angels' major-league staff in January 2022 as the team's catching instructor, succeeding José Molina. In July, he temporarily served as the Angels' manager for two games, due to the suspension of interim manager Phil Nevin and acting interim manager Ray Montgomery. For the 2023 season, Haselman was named the Angels' third base coach, succeeding Mike Gallego.

On November 3, 2025, the Cincinnati Reds hired Haselman to serve as the team's major league catching coach.

== Personal life ==
Haselman and his wife have two children. After he left the Red Sox following the 2006 season, Haselman took a position working for Merrill Lynch and also worked as a postgame radio host during Seattle Mariners games. Son Ty was a catcher for the UCLA Bruins during the 2018 season.

Sporting positions
Preceded by Euclides Rojas	Boston Red Sox bullpen coach 2005	Succeeded by Al Nipper
Preceded by Lynn Jones	Boston Red Sox first-base coach 2006	Succeeded by Luis Alicea
