= Aaron Sele =

American baseball player (born 1970)

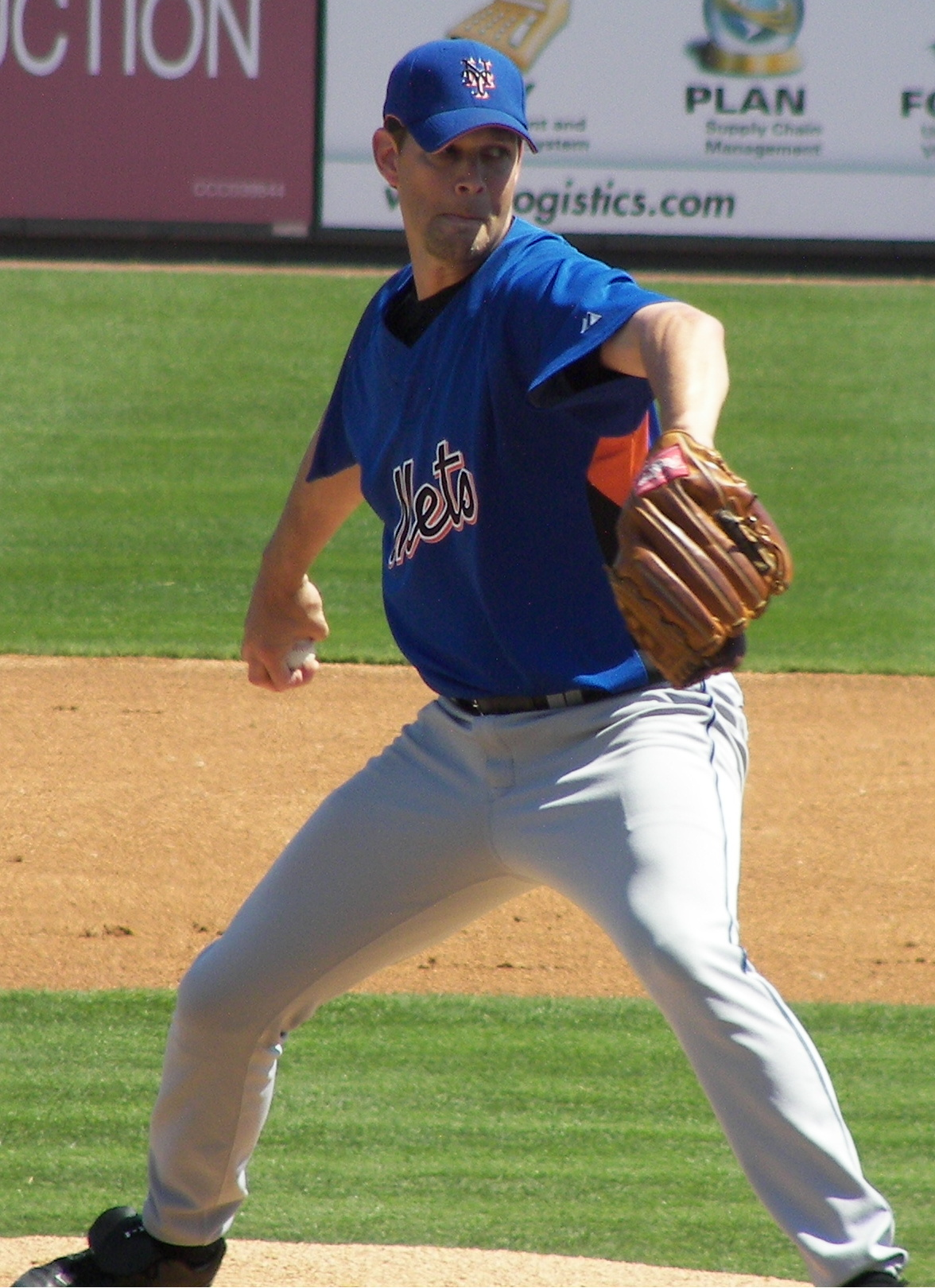
- Sele in spring training with the New York Mets
- Pitcher
- Born: June 25, 1970 (age 56); Golden Valley, Minnesota, U.S.
- Batted: Right Threw: Right

MLB debut
- June 23, 1993, for the Boston Red Sox

Last MLB appearance
- September 25, 2007, for the New York Mets

MLB statistics
- Win–loss record: 148–112
- Earned run average: 4.61
- Strikeouts: 1,407
- Stats at Baseball Reference

Teams
- Boston Red Sox (1993–1997); Texas Rangers (1998–1999); Seattle Mariners (2000–2001); Anaheim Angels (2002–2004); Seattle Mariners (2005); Los Angeles Dodgers (2006); New York Mets (2007)

Career highlights and awards
- 2× All-Star (1998, 2000)
Medals
Men's baseball
Representing United States
Goodwill Games
Bronze medal – third place	1990 Seattle	Team

Aaron Helmer Sele (born June 25, 1970) is an American former Major League Baseball (MLB) right-handed pitcher. Sele debuted with the Boston Red Sox in 1993. He was traded to the Texas Rangers after the 1997 season and was named to the All-Star team in 1998. He signed as a free agent with the Seattle Mariners in 2000 and became an All-Star for the second and final time that season. He later pitched for the Anaheim Angels, Los Angeles Dodgers, and New York Mets before retiring after the 2007 season. Sele won 15 or more games in four consecutive seasons from 1998 to 2001. His 69 wins in those four years led the American League, but during that stretch he had no wins and 6 losses in the postseason, the most losses for an MLB pitcher without a postseason win.

== Amateur career ==
Sele grew up in Poulsbo, Washington on the Kitsap Peninsula. He first started playing baseball in North Kitsap Little League. He attended North Kitsap High School, pitching on the baseball team. He helped lead the North Kitsap Vikings to the 1988 state championship.

Sele was drafted out of high school in the 37th round by the Minnesota Twins, but he chose to attend Washington State University where he played college baseball for the Cougars and head coach Bobo Brayton. Future MLB player Scott Hatteberg was in the same recruiting class as Sele. Sele and Hatteberg won three regular season Pac-10 titles in their three years in Pullman. In his first season in college, Sele went 6–5 with 3 saves, starting 8 of his 18 pitching appearances.

In Sele's sophomore season in 1990, the Cougars ended the season ranked 18th in the nation. Sele finished with a 12–3 with a 2.22 earned run average (ERA). He was named a first-team All-American by the American Baseball Coaches Association and third-team All-American by Baseball America. His 121 strikeouts, 10 complete games, and 121 2/3 innings pitched all rank second for a single season in school history. That summer, Sele pitched for Team USA, with Hatteberg again his teammate. On July 24, he pitched a three-hit shutout against Cuba with eight strikeouts. Sele led the American collegiate national team with 5 wins, 10 starts, 53 strikeouts, and 52 innings pitched.

In 1991, Sele went 8–6 with a 2.82 ERA for Washington State. He was named to the Pac-10 All-Conference First Team for the second consecutive year. He is the school leader with 278 strikeouts and is in the top 10 in wins, complete games, and innings pitched.

== Professional career ==
=== Boston Red Sox ===
==== Minor leagues ====
The Boston Red Sox selected Sele in the first round with the 23rd overall pick of the 1991 Major League Baseball draft. He received a $221,000 signing bonus. That summer he pitched for the Winter Haven Red Sox, going 3–6 with a team-high 4 complete games. He also pitched in the Florida Instructional League. He was a co-winner of the Tony Latham Memorial Award for a Red Sox player with the most enthusiasm. Sele advanced quickly through the Red Sox minor league system, pitching for the Class-A Advanced Lynchburg Red Sox and Double-A New Britain Red Sox in 1992. He had a combined 15–6 record with a 3.60 ERA and 141 strikeouts in 160 innings.

Before the 1993 season, Sele was ranked as the 84th best prospect by Baseball America, slightly worse than his ranking of 73rd the previous season. Sele began his third professional season with the Triple-A Pawtucket Red Sox. In his first start on April 10, he allowed no runs and one hit in 7 innings. With Pawtucket, he was 8–2 with a 2.19 ERA in 14 starts.

==== 1993: Rookie season ====
Sele joined the Red Sox on June 22 after ace Roger Clemens was placed on the disabled list. Sele made his major league debut the following night, allowing 1 run in 7 innings in a win over the Minnesota Twins. He struck out future Hall of Famer Dave Winfield for his first MLB strikeout. Sele was 6–0 with a 2.72 ERA in his first 8 starts for Boston. He was the third Red Sox rookie to ever win his first 6 decisions. His personal win streak ended on August 12 against the New York Yankees.

Pitching against the Chicago White Sox on September 6, Sele was involved in a memorable fight. After hitting George Bell with a pitch following another pitch high and inside, Bell charged the mound. Sele stood motionless until Bell was feet from him. At the last second, Sele ducked to his left, avoiding Bell's thrown punch. Boston's Mo Vaughn, having rushed to the mound from first base, tackled Bell to the ground. Both teams' benches emptied. Sele claimed he was not trying to hit Bell and tried to throw his second pitch down and away. Bell was ejected from the game and suspended for two games.

In his final start of his rookie season, Sele struck out a season-high 11 batters, earning a win over the Detroit Tigers. Sele allowed 3 or fewer earned runs in all 18 starts. Despite making only 18 starts, he was selected as the AL Rookie Pitcher of the Year by The Sporting News and the Red Sox Rookie of the Year. He finished third in Rookie of the Year voting and was named to Baseball Digest's Major League Rookie All-Star team. Baseball America named Sele the International League Most Valuable Pitcher.

==== 1994–1997 ====
Sele opened 1994 strong, going 5–1 with a 2.29 ERA in his first 8 starts. His threw complete games in consecutive starts on May 11 against the Milwaukee Brewers and on May 18 in Baltimore against the Orioles. However, he cooled off the rest of the season, with a 3–6 record and 4.79 ERA in final 14 starts. He finished his second MLB season ranking second on the Red Sox in starts, complete games, innings, and strikeouts, tying for second in wins. He tied for the AL lead in hit batsmen with 9.

Sele was the Red Sox's Opening Day starter in 1995, throwing five scoreless innings on April 26 against Minnesota in a 9–0 win. He made only six starts for the Red Sox, going 3–1 with a 3.06 ERA. In his final start, on May 23 at the Kingdome, he experienced soreness in his right arm. He was placed on the 15-day disabled list (DL) on June 2, retroactive to May 24. He made 2 rehabilitation starts each for the Sarasota Red Sox, Trenton Thunder, and Pawtucket Red Sox from late June to late August, going 0–1 with a 3.60 ERA. However, his arm soreness persisted, and he was moved to the 60-day DL on August 31.

In 1996, Sele returned from injury to start 29 games, the most in his career thus far. However, he posted the worst results of his career, with a 7–11 record and 5.32 ERA. He ranked fourth on Boston in starts, innings, strikeouts, and wins. He was placed on the 15-day DL on August 16 with a strained muscle in his left rib cage and made one start on rehab assignment on August 26 for Pawtucket before being activated on September 1.

In his first seven starts of 1997, Sele was 4–1 with a 3.72 ERA. After two disastrous starts, allowing 13 earned runs while getting just 13 outs, he went 4–1, 3.93 in a span of 5 outings from June 12 to July 3. He tied his then-career high with 11 strikeouts on July 12 against the Toronto Blue Jays. He was among the American League leaders in hit batters (second, 15), walks (tenth), and runs allowed (tied for tenth) and allowed 14.8 baserunners per 9 innings, the highest among AL starters.

=== Texas Rangers ===
Sele was traded to the Texas Rangers with Mark Bradenburg and Bill Haselman on November 6, 1997, for Damon Buford and Jim Leyritz.

Sele had two successful seasons with the Rangers. He again started strong 1998, beginning the season with an 11–4 record with a 3.95 ERA in his first 16 starts. He threw two complete game shutouts in April. He was the first MLB pitcher that season to win 8 games and later 11 games, as well as the first AL pitcher to reach 9, 10, and 12 wins. He was selected to his first All-Star Game, though he didn't pitch in the exhibition.

After a rough two month stretch, with a 5–7 record and 6.46 ERA from June 13 to August 14, Sele finished 1998 strong. He went 6–1 with a 2.41 ERA in his final 8 starts. He threw 13 2/3 consecutive scoreless innings across his starts on September 9 and 14. He finished the regular season with a 19–11 record and 4.23 ERA, with 167 strikeouts in 212 2/3 innings. He excelled at not allowing home runs, allowing only 0.59 home runs per 9 innings, seventh in the majors and below his 0.9 career average. He made his postseason debut in Game 3 of the American League Division Series (ALDS), giving up 4 runs in 6 innings as the Rangers were swept by the eventual World Series champion Yankees.

Sele had a second consecutive effective season in 1999. He again pitched well at the end of the season, with an 8–3 record and 3.57 ERA in August and September. He had a career high 13 strikeouts in a win against the Tigers on August 12. He went 18–9 with a 4.79 ERA in his second season with the Rangers. He tied for second in the AL in wins and was third with 186 strikeouts, his career high. He finished fifth in AL Cy Young Award voting, the only time he received votes for the top pitching award. For the second straight year, Sele lost to the Yankees in the ALDS, giving up 3 earned runs in five innings in an 8–0 loss in Game 1. He became a free agent after the 1999 season.

=== Seattle Mariners ===
On January 7, 2000, Sele agreed to a four-year, $29 million contract with the Baltimore Orioles, pending the results of a physical. Orioles owner Peter Angelos wasn't satisfied with the "moderate wear and tear" in Sele's right shoulder and attempted to restructure the deal to three years and $21 million. Sele instead returned to his home state and signed a two-year, $15 million contract with the Seattle Mariners three days later on January 10. Sele's college teammate John Olerud also signed with the Mariners that offseason.

Sele earned his second and final All-Star selection in 2000, pitching a scoreless fourth inning in the All-Star Game. He was the first Mariners right-handed pitcher to make an All-Star team, preceded by five different Seattle lefties. He was also the first Mariner right-hander with 10 wins before the All-Star break. However, he lost his first three starts after the break. He started for the Mariners on October 1 when the team clinched the wild card, allowing 2 runs and exiting with the game tied after 5 2/3 innings, before the Mariners eventual 5–2 victory. His next start was similar, pitching well but not earning a win as the Mariners advanced in the postseason: he allowed 1 run in 7 1/3 innings as the Mariners beat the White Sox in Game 3 of the ALDS. He continued his postseason losing streak to the Yankees, allowing 4 runs in 6 innings in Game 3 of the American League Championship Series (ALCS). Sele went 17–10, leading the Mariners in wins, with a 4.51 ERA and 137 strikeouts in 211 2/3 innings. He again excelled at not allowing home runs, finishing second in the American League, allowing only 0.723 home runs per 9 innings.

In his second season as a Mariner, Sele had career bests with a 3.60 ERA, 215 innings pitched and 1.24 walks plus hits allowed per inning. He earned 15 wins as the Mariners won 116 games, tied for the most in an MLB season.

Sele continued to struggle in the postseason, earning the loss in all three of his starts. He started the first and last games of the ALCS, both losses to the Yankees. He had a career 0–6 record in the playoffs with a 4.46 ERA in 7 postseason starts, pitching past the sixth inning only once. He has the most postseason losses by an MLB pitcher who never won a postseason game. The next-closest pitcher is Doyle Alexander, who was 0–5 in the playoffs.

=== Anaheim Angels ===
Sele signed a three-year, $24 million contract with the Anaheim Angels on December 26, 2001.

In his first season with the Angels, he finished with an 8–9 record in 27 starts over 160 innings in 2002. The Angels beat the San Francisco Giants in the 2002 World Series, but Sele did not pitch in the postseason or for much of the end of the regular season. He pitched only once after August 20 due to a partially torn rotator cuff. He underwent surgery on October 18, one day before the World Series began, to repair the injury.

Sele began 2003 on 15-day DL, still recovering from surgery. He returned to the Angels starting rotation on May 9. Sele had the worst ERA of his career, 5.77, with a 7–11 losing record that matched his 1996 results. He also had more walks than strikeouts for the only time in his MLB career.

After a poor season, Sele opened 2004 in the bullpen for the first time in his career. After allowing five earned runs in 3 1/3 innings in his first relief outing of the season, he allowed just one earned run over 7 innings in his next three relief outings. He returned to the starting rotation on May 1 and won his first 7 decisions, with a 4.52 ERA in 15 starts. He was the first pitcher in club history to open a season with a 7–0 record. His win streak included a stint on the 15-day DL after leaving a game on June 10 game due to shoulder fatigue. He finished his final season with the Angels with a 9–4 record and 5.05 ERA in 24 starts and four relief appearances. His 24 wins and .500 win–loss record with the Angels were the lowest for any team he pitched multiple seasons for.

=== Seattle Mariners (second stint) ===
Sele signed a $700,000 minor league contract with the Mariners in January 2005. He started the season 6–5 but lost his last 7 decisions, ending his final stretch with the Mariners with a 6–12 record and a 5.66 ERA in 21 starts. The Mariners released Sele on August 1.

Sele signed a minor league contract with the Rangers on August 6, 2005. He made two starts for the Triple-A Oklahoma City RedHawks, allowing 11 earned runs in 12 1/3 innings. The Rangers released him on August 15.

=== Los Angeles Dodgers ===
Sele signed with the Los Angeles Dodgers on January 14, 2006. He began the season with the Triple-A Las Vegas 51s but joined the Dodgers on May 5. He again started strong, earning wins in three of his four first starts and had a 4–2 record and 2.73 ERA at the end of June. He regressed in the final three months of the season, starting only 4 more games and posting a 6.39 ERA in 50 2/3 innings. His final career start was on September 3, when he allowed 6 runs in 4 1/3 innings to the visiting Colorado Rockies. He was the winning pitcher on September 18, when the Dodgers hit 4 consecutive home runs in the bottom of the 9th inning, then won on Nomar Garciaparra's tenth-inning walk-off home run. Sele allowed one run in the top of the 10th inning in that game.

=== New York Mets ===
On January 25, 2007, Sele signed a minor league contract with the New York Mets and received a non-roster invitation to spring training. Sele served as the long reliever from the Mets bullpen. He pitched in 34 games, tied for his season high, but made no starts for the first time in his career. He had a 3–2 record with a 5.37 ERA. Sele retired in 2007.

== Personal life ==
Sele and his ex-wife Jennifer have four daughters: Katherine, Claire, Caroline, and Charlotte.

In high school, Sele was also a starting quarterback on the football team and a forward on the basketball team.

In 1993, a man was convicted in North Dakota of forgery after opening a bank account in Sele's name.

Sele was inducted into the Kitsap Sports Hall of Fame in 2009, the Washington State Cougars Hall of Fame in 2013, and the Washington Sports Hall of Fame in 2020.

== Post-playing career ==
On October 31, 2008, the Dodgers named Sele their minor league pitching instructor. In 2012, the Dodgers named him as a Special Assistant, Player Personnel. After the 2017 season, he left the Dodgers organization to become a special assignment scout for the Miami Marlins. In January 2019, he became a scout for the Chicago Cubs. He posted on his LinkedIn account that he became a scout for the Kansas City Royals starting in 2023.

Sele received only one vote in 2013 Baseball Hall of Fame balloting, resulting in his removal from further balloting. Sele said he viewed the one vote as a sign of respect, and he joked that he was 152 wins short of 300 career wins.

== See also ==
- List of Major League Baseball career hit batsmen leaders
