= Mike Milchin =

American baseball player (born 1968)

- Pitcher
- Born: February 28, 1968 (age 58); Knoxville, Tennessee, U.S.
- Batted: Left Threw: Left

MLB debut
- May 14, 1996, for the Minnesota Twins

Last MLB appearance
- September 29, 1996, for the Baltimore Orioles

MLB statistics
- Win–loss record: 3–1
- Earned run average: 7.44
- Strikeouts: 29
- Stats at Baseball Reference

Teams
- Minnesota Twins (1996); Baltimore Orioles (1996)
Medals
Baseball
Representing the United States
Olympic Games
Gold medal – first place	1988 Seoul	Team
Baseball World Cup
Silver medal – second place	1988 Rome	Team
World Junior Baseball Championship
Bronze medal – third place	1986 Windsor	Team

Michael Wayne Milchin (born February 28, 1968) is an American former Major League Baseball pitcher who played for one season. He played for the Minnesota Twins for 26 games during the 1996 season and the Baltimore Orioles for 13 games during the 1996 season.

== Biography ==
Milchin was born in Knoxville, Tennessee, and is Jewish. He attended John Randolph Tucker High School in Richmond, Virginia, and played at Clemson University. In 1987, he played collegiate summer baseball with the Orleans Cardinals of the Cape Cod Baseball League. He was on the Gold Medal Team USA at the 1988 Summer Olympic Games.

He played for the Minnesota Twins for 26 games during the 1996 season and the Baltimore Orioles for 13 games during the 1996 season. He had been claimed off waivers by the Orioles from the Twins on August 8, 1996. He was left off the Orioles roster for the 1996 postseason in favor of Arthur Rhodes. He was released by the Orioles on November 19, 1996.

Milchin is as of 2020 the Player Representative; Baseball, of Independent Sports & Entertainment.
