= Joe Hudson (pitcher) =

American baseball player (born 1970)

- Pitcher
- Born: September 29, 1970 (age 55); Philadelphia, Pennsylvania, U.S.
- Batted: Right Threw: Right

MLB debut
- June 10, 1995, for the Boston Red Sox

Last MLB appearance
- August 7, 1998, for the Milwaukee Brewers

MLB statistics
- Win–loss record: 6–7
- Earned run average: 4.82
- Strikeouts: 62
- Stats at Baseball Reference

Teams
- Boston Red Sox (1995–1997); Milwaukee Brewers (1998)

Joseph Paul Hudson (born September 29, 1970) is an American former relief pitcher in Major League Baseball who played from 1995 through 1998 for the Boston Red Sox (1995–97) and Milwaukee Brewers (1998). Listed at 6 ft 1 in (1.85 m), 175 lb., Hudson batted and threw right-handed. He was selected by Boston in the 1992 draft out of the West Virginia University.

== Biography ==
In a two-season career, Hudson posted a 6–7 record with a 4.82 ERA and two saves in 102 relief appearances, including 62 strikeouts, 53 walks, and 127.0 innings of work. He also pitched a shutout inning in the 1995 AL Division Series.

Hudson's first save came against the Twins on July 21, 1995. Hudson pitched 3 2/3 innings, preserving the 13-5 Red Sox victory for starter Zane Smith.

Following his majors career, Hudson pitched from 1998 to 2000 for the Boston, Milwaukee and Texas Triple-A affiliate teams.

Hudson's career was untimely ended by an injury to his pitching arm. He now lives in New Jersey with his wife, Kelly, and his four children.
