= Brent Knackert =

American baseball player (born 1969)

- Pitcher
- Born: August 1, 1969 (age 56); Los Angeles, California, U.S.
- Batted: Right Threw: Right

MLB debut
- April 10, 1990, for the Seattle Mariners

Last MLB appearance
- June 4, 1996, for the Boston Red Sox

MLB statistics
- Win–loss record: 1–2
- Earned run average: 7.04
- Strikeouts: 33
- Stats at Baseball Reference

Teams
- Seattle Mariners (1990); Boston Red Sox (1996)

Brent Bradley Knackert (born August 1, 1969) is an American former pitcher in Major League Baseball (MLB) who played for the Seattle Mariners (1990) and Boston Red Sox (1996). Listed at 6' 3" and 185 lb., he threw and batter right-handed.

Knackert attended Ocean View High School in Huntington Beach, California. He was suspended in 1987, his senior year, for skipping classes, which limited him to seven innings pitched of high school baseball that year. He threw an 88 mile-per-hour fastball as a senior. After an impressive performance at semi-pro games, the Chicago White Sox selected him in the second round of the 1987 MLB draft. He signed for $62,500. Knackert gained 30 pounds of weight during his first two seasons in the minor leagues before White Sox staff started a weight-loss program for him, and he dropped 20 pounds by mid-1989.

The New York Mets selected Knackert in the Rule 5 draft in December 1989. The Mariners selected him off waivers in April 1990, and he made the team's roster. He and teammate Ken Griffey Jr. were among the eight youngest MLB players that year.

After his first season in the majors, Knackert returned to the minors. Seattle released him in April 1993, and he returned to the Mets organization. He signed with the Red Sox in November 1995 and returned to the majors at age 26 in 1996, which was his final season in professional baseball.

In the majors, Knackert had a 1–2 record with 33 strikeouts and a 7.04 ERA in 32 appearances, including two starts, in 47 1/3 innings pitched.
