= Walt McKeel =

American baseball player (1972–2019)

- Catcher
- Born: January 17, 1972; Wilson, North Carolina
- Died: January 1, 2019 (aged 46); Stantonsburg, North Carolina
- Batted: Right Threw: Right

MLB debut
- September 14, 1996, for the Boston Red Sox

Last MLB appearance
- July 27, 2002, for the Colorado Rockies

MLB statistics
- Batting average: .250
- At bats: 16
- Hits: 4
- Stats at Baseball Reference

Teams
- Boston Red Sox (1996–1997); Colorado Rockies (2002)

Walter Thomas McKeel (January 17, 1972 – January 1, 2019) was an American professional baseball player. He played parts of three seasons in Major League Baseball (MLB), between 1996 and 2002, for the Boston Red Sox and Colorado Rockies, primarily as a catcher. Listed at 6 feet 2 inches (1.88 m) and 200 pounds (91 kg), he batted and threw right-handed.

== Biography ==
In a three-season MLB career, McKeel was a .250 hitter (4-for-16) and scored one run in 16 games. In 10 catching appearances, he posted a perfect 1.000 fielding percentage in 26 chances. He also appeared in one game as a first baseman, fielding two chances there without an error.

McKeel also played in the Boston, Detroit and Colorado minor league systems from 1990 to 2002. In a 13-season minor-league career, he hit .256 with 81 home runs and 390 RBI in 906 games.

McKeel was one of many replacement players who appeared during spring training in 1995 due to the MLB players strike.

McKeel was hospitalized in 2014, following a crash in which he was charged with driving under the influence, reportedly due to prescription medication. He died on January 1, 2019, aged 46 at his house in North Carolina.

== See also ==
- List of Major League Baseball replacement players
