= Rudy Pemberton =

Dominican baseball player (born 1969)

- Outfielder
- Born: December 17, 1969 (age 56); San Pedro de Macorís, Dominican Republic
- Batted: Right Threw: Right

Professional debut
- MLB: April 26, 1995, for the Detroit Tigers
- NPB: July 15, 1997, for the Seibu Lions
- KBO: June 8, 2002, for the Kia Tigers
- CPBL: April 29, 2006, for the Macoto Cobras

Last appearance
- MLB: June 2, 1997, for the Boston Red Sox
- NPB: October 26, 1998, for the Seibu Lions
- KBO: November 1, 2002, for the Kia Tigers
- CPBL: May 28, 2006, for the Macoto Cobras

MLB statistics
- Batting average: .336
- Home runs: 3
- Runs batted in: 23

NPB statistics
- Batting average: .227
- Home runs: 6
- Runs batted in: 20

KBO statistics
- Batting average: .255
- Home runs: 11
- Runs batted in: 48

CPBL statistics
- Batting average: .269
- Home runs: 4
- Runs batted in: 13
- Stats at Baseball Reference

Teams
- Detroit Tigers (1995); Boston Red Sox (1996–1997); Seibu Lions (1997–1998); Kia Tigers (2002); Macoto Cobras (2006)

Rudy Héctor Pemberton Pérez (born December 17, 1969) is a Dominican former professional baseball outfielder. He played parts of three seasons in Major League Baseball, from 1995 through 1997, for the Detroit Tigers (1995) and Boston Red Sox (1996–1997), playing mainly as a right fielder. He also played for the Seibu Lions in Japan at the end of 1997 and in 1998, and for the Kia Tigers in Korea in 2002. Listed at 6' 1", 185 lb., he batted and threw right-handed.

Pemberton spent six years in the Tigers minor league system before joining the big team in 1995, hitting for a .300 batting average (9-for-30) in 12 games. He entered the baseball record books with the 1996 Red Sox, after recording 21 hits in 41 at-bats for a .512 batting average, to collect the highest batting average for any player who had 30 or more at-bats in a major league season.

In a three-season career, Pemberton was a .336 hitter (45-for-134) with three home runs and 23 RBI in 52 games, including 22 runs, 13 doubles, one triple and three stolen bases.

Following his major league career, Pemberton played with the Oklahoma City 89ers (1996), Pawtucket Red Sox (1996), Birmingham Barons (1999) and Memphis Redbirds (1999), being named the Triple-A All-Star outfielder during the 1996 season. He also played in the Mexican League in 2000–03 and 2005. In 11 minor league seasons he hit .336 with 113 home runs with 509 RBI in 930 games.
