= Dave Stevens (baseball) =

American baseball player (born 1970)

- Pitcher
- Born: March 4, 1970 (age 56); Fullerton, California, U.S.
- Batted: Right Threw: Right

MLB debut
- May 20, 1994, for the Minnesota Twins

Last MLB appearance
- July 6, 2000, for the Atlanta Braves

MLB statistics
- Win–loss record: 15–16
- Earned run average: 6.02
- Strikeouts: 170
- Stats at Baseball Reference

Teams
- Minnesota Twins (1994–1997); Chicago Cubs (1997–1998); Cleveland Indians (1999); Atlanta Braves (2000)

David James Stevens (born March 4, 1970) is an American former Major League Baseball pitcher who played for the Minnesota Twins (1994-1997), Chicago Cubs (1998), Cleveland Indians (1999), and Atlanta Braves (2000).
