= Dan Naulty =

American baseball player (born 1970)

- Pitcher
- Born: January 6, 1970 (age 56); Los Angeles, California, U.S.
- Batted: Right Threw: Right

MLB debut
- April 2, 1996, for the Minnesota Twins

Last MLB appearance
- October 3, 1999, for the New York Yankees

MLB statistics
- Win–loss record: 5-5
- Earned run average: 3.54
- Strikeouts: 119
- Stats at Baseball Reference

Teams
- Minnesota Twins (1996–1998); New York Yankees (1999)

Daniel Donovan Naulty (born January 6, 1970) is an American former Major League Baseball pitcher who is now a pastor. He is the only player mentioned in the Mitchell Report to openly admit to using performance-enhancing drugs in the report.

== Early years ==
Richard & Una Mae Naulty (Dan's parents) divorced in 1976 when Naulty was six years old. After living briefly with his mother in Palos Verdes, California, Naulty returned to Pasadena to live with his father. At the urging of a baseball coach, Richard & Dan moved to Huntington Beach, California when Dan was twelve years old.

After graduating from Ocean View High School in Huntington Beach, Naulty spent two years at Cerritos College winning a State Championship before transferring to Cal State Fullerton, where he competed in the 1992 College World Series. Cal State lost in the finals to Pepperdine University; Naulty was the losing pitcher. Four days later, he signed with the Minnesota Twins, who had drafted him in the 14th round of the 1992 Major League Baseball draft.

Naulty went 0-1 with a 5.50 earned run average in his first professional season with the Kenosha Twins of the Midwest League. A hip injury limited him to just six appearances and eighteen innings pitched. He returned healthy the following season to pitch a combined 146 innings for the Fort Wayne Wizards and Fort Myers Miracle.

== Major leagues ==
He made the Twins out of Spring training 1996, and made his major league debut against the Detroit Tigers in the second game of the season. He went 3-2 with a 3.79 ERA, and earned four saves in 49 games his rookie season, but was shut down late in the season due to a circulatory problem in his right arm. His role soon diminished as he spent the next two seasons going back-and-forth to the disabled list and doing rehab stints in the minors. In 1997 and 1998, Naulty went a combined 1-3 with a 5.53 ERA and one save at the major league level. He tore his right groin off his pelvis in his final game as a Twin on July 11, 1998. Following the season, he was traded to the New York Yankees for minor league prospect Allen Butler.

He went 1-0 with a 2.38 ERA with the Yankees (the Yankees were 6-27 in games Naulty appeared in). Though he did not make a postseason appearance, he earned a World Series ring with the Yankees in 1999. After just one season in New York City, Naulty was traded to the Los Angeles Dodgers for minor league first baseman Nick Leach. The Dodgers released him during spring training 2000. He soon caught on with the Kansas City Royals, but soon retired to become a pastor.

== Mitchell Report ==
George J. Mitchell contacted Naulty in January 2007 as part of his investigation of performance-enhancing drug use by Major League Baseball players. He is first mentioned on page 232 of the Mitchell Report, and is very candid with his admissions. He is one of few former and current baseball players interviewed by investigators to admit to using steroids, beginning in 1993 as a minor leaguer and continuing through his major league career. He also admits to using human growth hormone for one year, 1998, to recover from the groin injury. Naulty attributed his willingness to openly discuss his drug use to the remorse he felt. He told investigators, "if I could give back a little bit of something good, then I would like to."

Shortly after the Mitchell Report came out, Naulty wrote an article for the New York Daily News detailing his drug use. He said he had access to, but did not use, steroids as far back as high school. Shortly after being drafted, he realized that in order to compete, he needed to throw harder, and add muscle to his thin 6'6" frame. Thus, he began taking anabolic steroids and amphetamines, and soon went from 185 pounds to 240, and added ten miles per hour to his fastball. The 1998 groin injury he attributes to having added more muscle to the major tendon in his groin than it is equipped to handle. Therefore, shortly after his trade to the Yankees, he began taking HGH.

The negative impact of his drug use hit him later in his career when he thought about the fact that he took a roster spot from another player who was competing naturally. He fell into alcoholism, and began having severe mood swings from all the testosterone in his body. He claims that the night the Yankees won the World Series, he went out partying with friends, and was contemplating suicide by the end of the night.

Naulty details a hard upbringing in an article published by Tom Verducci in the June 4, 2012 issue of Sports Illustrated. His older sister's heroin and crack cocaine addiction is what led to the decision for him to live with his father. Shortly after moving to Huntington Beach with his father, his father took a job in Kuwait that left Dan in the care of a baseball coach most of the time, who soon began sexually abusing him. Shortly afterwards, a female teacher also began abusing Naulty.

== Academics ==
Naulty has degrees from Moody Bible Institute in Biblical Studies, an MA in Biblical Studies from Trinity Theological Seminary, and a postgraduate degree from Oxford University (UK) in Applied Theology.

== See also ==
- List of Major League Baseball players named in the Mitchell Report
