= Mark Brandenburg (baseball) =

American baseball player (born 1970)

- Pitcher
- Born: July 14, 1970 (age 56); Houston, Texas, U.S.
- Batted: Right Threw: Right

MLB debut
- July 20, 1995, for the Texas Rangers

Last MLB appearance
- September 27, 1997, for the Boston Red Sox

MLB statistics
- Win–loss record: 5–8
- Earned run average: 4.49
- Strikeouts: 121
- Stats at Baseball Reference

Teams
- Texas Rangers (1995–1996); Boston Red Sox (1996–1997)

Mark Clay Brandenburg (born July 14, 1970) is an American former middle-relief pitcher in Major League Baseball who played from 1995 through 1997 for the Texas Rangers (1995–96) and Boston Red Sox (1996–97). Brandenburg batted and threw right-handed. Listed at 6' 0", 180 lb., he was selected by the Texas Rangers in the 1992 draft out of Texas Tech.

In a three-season career, Brandenburg posted a 5–8 record with a 4.49 earned run average, 121 strikeouts, 56 walks, 144 ⅓ innings, and no saves, in 97 games pitched.

In July 2008, Brandenburg was inducted into the Texas Tech Athletics Hall of Fame.

His daughter, Ryan Kate, appeared on Season 3 of MasterChef Junior and Season 15 of MasterChef.
