= 1996 Toronto Blue Jays season =

1996 Toronto Blue Jays
- League: American League
- Division: East
- Ballpark: SkyDome
- City: Toronto
- Record: 74–88 (.457)
- Divisional place: 4th
- Owners: Interbrew, Canadian Imperial Bank of Commerce
- General managers: Gord Ash
- Managers: Cito Gaston
- Television: CBC Television (Brian Williams, Tommy Hutton); Baton (Don Chevrier, Tommy Hutton, Fergie Olver); The Sports Network (Dan Shulman, Buck Martinez)
- Radio: CJCL (AM) (Jerry Howarth, Tom Cheek)

The 1996 Toronto Blue Jays season was the 20th season in franchise history. The season involved the Blue Jays finishing fourth in the American League East with a record of 74 wins and 88 losses. The Blue Jays had a losing record for the third consecutive season.

== Transactions ==
Transactions by the Toronto Blue Jays during the off-season before the 1996 season.

=== October 1995 ===
October 16	Brent Bowers granted free agency (signed with Baltimore Orioles to a contract on November 30, 1995). Darren Hall granted free agency (signed with Los Angeles Dodgers to a one-year, $175,000 contract on November 1, 1995). Wally Whitehurst granted free agency (signed with Montreal Expos to a one-year, $125,000 contract on December 1, 1995).
October 19	Mike Huff granted free agency (signed with Toronto Blue Jays to a one-year contract on December 20, 1995).
October 30	Roberto Alomar granted free agency (signed with Baltimore Orioles to a three-year, $18 million contract on December 21, 1995).

=== November 1995 ===
November 1	Danny Cox granted free agency (signed with Toronto Blue Jays to a contract on December 6, 1995). Devon White granted free agency (signed with Florida Marlins to a three-year, $9.9 million contract on November 21, 1995).
November 2	Lance Parrish granted free agency (signed with Pittsburgh Pirates to a contract on January 4, 1996). Duane Ward granted free agency.
November 3	Paul Molitor granted free agency (signed with Minnesota Twins to a two-year, $5.5 million contract on December 5, 1995).
November 6	Al Leiter granted free agency (signed with Florida Marlins to a three-year, $8.6 million contract on December 14, 1995).

=== December 1995 ===
December 4	Mike Coolbaugh drafted by the Texas Rangers in the 1995 MLB Rule 5 draft.
December 6	Re-signed free agent Danny Cox to a one-year contract. Signed Rich Rowland from the Boston Red Sox to a contract. Acquired Paul Quantrill from the Philadelphia Phillies for Howard Battle and Ricardo Jordan.
December 7	Signed free agent Otis Nixon from the Texas Rangers to a two-year, $4.4 million contract.
December 14	Signed free agent Charlie O'Brien from the Atlanta Braves to a two-year, $1.25 million contract.
December 18	Acquired Miguel Cairo and Bill Risley from the Seattle Mariners for Edwin Hurtado and Paul Menhart.
December 20	Re-signed free agent Mike Huff to a one-year contract. Re-signed Juan Guzmán to a one-year, $2.24 million contract. Re-signed Randy Knorr to a one-year, $280,000 contract.
December 22	Signed free agent Erik Hanson from the Boston Red Sox to a three-year, $9.4 million contract.

=== January 1996 ===
January 16	Signed free agent Juan Samuel from the Kansas City Royals to a one-year, $325,000 contract.
January 24	Signed free agent Rubén Amaro Jr. from the Cleveland Indians to a one-year, $109,000 contract.

=== February 1996 ===
February 10	Signed free agent Dane Johnson from the Chicago White Sox to a one-year, $125,000 contract.
February 20	Signed free agent Brian Bohanon from the Detroit Tigers to a one-year, $185,000 contract.
February 22	Signed free agent Frank Viola from the Cincinnati Reds to a one-year contract.

=== March 1996 ===
March 10	Signed free agent Wes Chamberlain from the Kansas City Royals to a contract.
March 13	Acquired Scott Pose from the Cleveland Indians for Joe Lis.
March 14	Selected Roberto Durán off of waivers from the Los Angeles Dodgers.
March 24	Released Ben Weber.
March 29	Ken Robinson selected off of waivers by the Kansas City Royals.

== Regular season ==
A new tradition would start in 1996 as the Blue Jays donned red uniforms for the first time. These uniforms would be worn only on Canada Day and would feature "Canada" on the back of their jerseys rather than a player's name. Eventual Cy Young Award winner Pat Hentgen would start the Canada Day match against the Baltimore Orioles.

The final series of the season would be embroiled in controversy. Against the American League East champion Baltimore Orioles, two events would define the Orioles season. The game on Friday, September 27, 1996, would go down as one of the most infamous events in baseball history, as former Blue Jay Roberto Alomar would spit at umpire John Hirschbeck. The Sunday game would be a coming-out party for Brady Anderson, as he would hit his 50th home run of the regular season off Pat Hentgen. The total would break Frank Robinson's team record for most home runs in a season.

1996 also marked the end of an era for the Blue Jays, as they would redesign their logo and uniforms in the following year and also radically shake up their roster.

=== Season standings ===
AL East
Team	W	L	Pct.	GB	Home	Road
New York Yankees	92	70	.568	—	49‍–‍31	43‍–‍39
Baltimore Orioles	88	74	.543	4	43‍–‍38	45‍–‍36
Boston Red Sox	85	77	.525	7	47‍–‍34	38‍–‍43
Toronto Blue Jays	74	88	.457	18	35‍–‍46	39‍–‍42
Detroit Tigers	53	109	.327	39	27‍–‍54	26‍–‍55

=== Record vs. opponents ===
1996 American League record Source: MLB Standings Grid – 1996
Team	BAL	BOS	CAL	CWS	CLE	DET	KC	MIL	MIN	NYY	OAK	SEA	TEX	TOR
Baltimore	—	7–6	6–6	4–8	5–7	11–2	9–3	9–3	7–5	3–10	9–4	7–5	3–10–1	8–5
Boston	6–7	—	8–4	6–6	1–11	12–1	3–9	7–5	6–6	7–6	8–5	7–6	6–6	8–5
California	6–6	4–8	—	6–6	4–9	6–6	4–8	7–5	4–8	7–6	6–7	5–8	4–9	7–5
Chicago	8–4	6–6	6–6	—	5–8	10–3	7–6	6–7	6–7	6–7	5–7	5–7	8–4	7–5
Cleveland	7–5	11–1	9–4	8–5	—	12–0	7–6	7–6	10–3	3–9	6–6	8–4	4–8	7–5
Detroit	2–11	1–12	6–6	3–10	0–12	—	6–6	4–8	6–6	5–8	4–8	6–6	4–9	6–7
Kansas City	3–9	9–3	8–4	6–7	6–7	6–6	—	4–9	6–7	4–8	5–7	7–5	6–6	5–8
Milwaukee	3–9	5–7	5–7	7–6	6–7	8–4	9–4	—	9–4	6–6	7–5	4–9	6–7	5–7
Minnesota	5–7	6–6	8–4	7–6	3–10	6–6	7–6	4–9	—	5–7	6–7	6–6	7–5	8–5
New York	10–3	6–7	6–7	7–6	9–3	8–5	8–4	6–6	7–5	—	9–3	3–9	5–7	8–5
Oakland	4–9	5–8	7–6	7–5	6–6	8–4	7–5	5–7	7–6	3–9	—	8–5	7–6	4–8
Seattle	5–7	6–7	8–5	7–5	4–8	6–6	5–7	9–4	6–6	9–3	5–8	—	10–3	5–7
Texas	10–3–1	6–6	9–4	4–8	8–4	9–4	6–6	7–6	5–7	7–5	6–7	3–10	—	10–2
Toronto	5–8	5–8	5–7	5–7	5–7	7–6	8–5	7–5	5–8	5–8	8–4	7–5	2–10	—

=== Game log ===
1996 Game Log: 74–88 (Home: 35–46; Away: 39–42)
April: 11–14 (Home: 5–9; Away: 6–5)

#	Date	Opponent	Score	Win	Loss	Save	Attendance	Record
1	April 1	@ Athletics	9–6	**Hanson** (1–0)	Reyes	**Timlin** (1)	7,294	1–0
2	April 3	@ Athletics	10–4	**Hentgen** (1–0)	Prieto	—	8,050	2–0
3	April 5	@ Indians	7–1	**Guzman** (1–0)	Hershiser	—	41,782	3–0
4	April 6	@ Indians	3–5	Nagy	**Hanson** (1–1)	Mesa	41,852	3–1
5	April 7	@ Indians	3–8	Martinez	**Quantrill** (0–1)	—	41,689	3–2
6	April 9	Angels	5–0	**Hentgen** (2–0)	Langston	—	36,616	4–2
7	April 10	Angels	1–2	Holzemer	**Guzman** (1–1)	Percival	25,446	4–3
8	April 11	Angels	7–4	**Hanson** (2–1)	Abbott	**Timlin** (2)	25,512	5–3
9	April 12	Mariners	6–9	Hitchcock	**Quantrill** (0–2)	—	31,293	5–4
10	April 13	Mariners	3–14	Bosio	**Ware** (0–1)	—	33,645	5–5
11	April 14	Mariners	4–9	Wolcott	**Hentgen** (2–1)	—	29,301	5–6
12	April 15	Tigers	8–2	**Guzman** (2–1)	Olivares	—	26,127	6–6
13	April 16	Tigers	8–13	Gohr	**Hanson** (2–2)	Lewis	25,503	6–7
14	April 17	@ Angels	1–5	Finley	**Quantrill** (0–3)	—	15,361	6–8
15	April 18	@ Angels	6–9	James	**Ware** (0–2)	Percival	25,083	6–9
16	April 19	@ Mariners	10–4	**Hentgen** (3–1)	Wolcott	**Bohanon** (1)	32,189	7–9
17	April 20	@ Mariners	3–1	**Guzman** (3–1)	Menhart	**Timlin** (3)	47,487	8–9
18	April 21	@ Mariners	5–9	Johnson	**Hanson** (2–3)	—	34,915	8–10
19	April 22	@ Mariners	16–7	**Castillo** (1–0)	Hurtado	—	18,467	9–10
20	April 24	Athletics	6–7	Prieto	**Hentgen** (3–2)	Corsi	28,029	9–11
21	April 25	Athletics	3–4 (11)	Mohler	**Crabtree** (0–1)	—	26,163	9–12
22	April 26	Indians	3–6	Hershiser	**Hanson** (2–4)	Mesa	30,227	9–13
23	April 27	Indians	11–6	**Castillo** (2–0)	Nagy	—	40,140	10–13
24	April 28	Indians	3–17	Lopez	**Viola** (0–1)	—	31,143	10–14
25	April 30	Brewers	9–8	**Crabtree** (1–1)	Boze	—	25,467	11–14

May: 13–15 (Home: 8–5; Away: 5–10)

#	Date	Opponent	Score	Win	Loss	Save	Attendance	Record
26	May 1	Brewers	9–3	**Guzman** (4–1)	Miranda	—	25,684	12–14
27	May 2	Brewers	7–5	**Hanson** (3–4)	Karl	**Timlin** (4)	31,299	13–14
28	May 3	@ Red Sox	7–8	Moyer	**Quantrill** (0–4)	Slocumb	25,570	13–15
29	May 4	@ Red Sox	4–8	Gordon	**Viola** (0–2)	Slocumb	29,785	13–16
30	May 5	@ Red Sox	11–4	**Hentgen** (4–2)	Wakefield	—	29,866	14–16
31	May 7	@ Rangers	1–5	Oliver	**Guzman** (4–2)	—	23,005	14–17
32	May 8	@ Rangers	2–4	Witt	**Hanson** (3–5)	Henneman	20,694	14–18
33	May 9	@ Rangers	5–2	**Quantrill** (1–4)	Hill	**Timlin** (5)	34,451	15–18
34	May 10	Red Sox	5–6 (11)	Slocumb	**Carrara** (0–1)	—	31,159	15–19
35	May 11	Red Sox	9–8 (11)	**Quantrill** (2–4)	Knackert	—	33,163	16–19
36	May 12	Red Sox	8–7 (10)	**Janzen** (1–0)	Slocumb	—	31,188	17–19
37	May 14	@ Twins	4–2	**Hanson** (4–5)	Robertson	**Timlin** (6)	13,483	18–19
38	May 15	@ Twins	1–2	Rodriguez	**Hentgen** (4–3)	—	11,793	18–20
39	May 16	@ Twins	1–4	Radke	**Quantrill** (2–5)	Stevens	13,538	18–21
40	May 17	@ Royals	2–4	Belcher	**Guzman** (4–3)	Montgomery	20,079	18–22
41	May 18	@ Royals	6–2	**Viola** (1–2)	Appier	—	18,116	19–22
42	May 19	@ Royals	3–2	**Hanson** (5–5)	Gubicza	**Timlin** (7)	15,039	20–22
43	May 20	@ Royals	4–5	Haney	**Hentgen** (4–4)	Montgomery	14,303	20–23
44	May 21	@ White Sox	1–2	Tapani	**Ware** (0–3)	Hernandez	17,483	20–24
45	May 22	@ White Sox	1–2 (11)	McCaskill	**Timlin** (0–1)	—	17,882	20–25
46	May 23	Twins	5–4 (10)	**Janzen** (2–0)	Milchin	—	31,163	21–25
47	May 24	Twins	0–4	Robertson	**Hanson** (5–6)	—	33,141	21–26
48	May 25	Twins	4–6 (10)	Guardado	**Castillo** (2–1)	Stevens	34,118	21–27
49	May 26	Twins	3–9	Naulty	**Bohanon** (0–1)	—	30,170	21–28
50	May 27	White Sox	5–4	**Janzen** (3–0)	Fernandez	**Timlin** (8)	30,013	22–28
51	May 28	White Sox	5–8	Baldwin	**Viola** (1–3)	Hernandez	30,104	22–29
52	May 29	White Sox	6–5	**Hanson** (6–6)	Magrane	**Timlin** (9)	31,074	23–29
53	May 31	Royals	4–2	**Hentgen** (5–4)	Gubicza	**Timlin** (10)	33,194	24–29

June: 12–15 (Home: 5–6; Away: 7–9)

#	Date	Opponent	Score	Win	Loss	Save	Attendance	Record
54	June 1	Royals	5–3 (10)	**Crabtree** (2–1)	Montgomery	—	31,107	25–29
55	June 2	Royals	5–7	Belcher	**Janzen** (3–1)	Montgomery	32,253	25–30
56	June 4	@ Yankees	4–5	Gooden	**Hanson** (6–7)	Wetteland	17,368	25–31
57	June 5	@ Yankees	12–7	**Hentgen** (6–4)	Key	—	17,142	26–31
58	June 6	@ Yankees	1–8	Pettitte	**Quantrill** (2–6)	—	18,475	26–32
59	June 7	@ Rangers	7–10	Pavlik	**Janzen** (3–2)	Henneman	40,046	26–33
60	June 8	@ Rangers	0–2	Oliver	**Guzman** (4–4)	—	43,439	26–34
61	June 9	@ Rangers	6–8	Witt	**Hanson** (6–8)	Henneman	41,605	26–35
62	June 10	Yankees	3–5	Key	**Hentgen** (6–5)	Wetteland	37,332	26–36
63	June 11	Yankees	4–6	Pettitte	**Quantrill** (2–7)	Wetteland	32,114	26–37
64	June 12	Yankees	7–4	**Janzen** (4–2)	Mendoza	—	44,238	27–37
65	June 13	@ Angels	4–6	Finley	**Guzman** (4–5)	James	20,528	27–38
66	June 14	@ Angels	4–7	Grimsley	**Hanson** (6–9)	Percival	18,503	27–39
67	June 15	@ Angels	5–7	Langston	**Crabtree** (2–2)	Percival	40,352	27–40
68	June 16	@ Angels	6–4	**Quantrill** (3–7)	Abbott	**Timlin** (11)	22,979	28–40
69	June 18	@ Mariners	11–3	**Guzman** (5–5)	Wolcott	—	25,912	29–40
70	June 19	@ Mariners	9–2	**Hanson** (7–9)	Harikkala	—	26,265	30–40
71	June 20	@ Athletics	1–0	**Hentgen** (7–5)	Wengert	**Timlin** (12)	8,027	31–40
72	June 21	@ Athletics	7–5	**Quantrill** (4–7)	Johns	**Timlin** (13)	10,278	32–40
73	June 22	@ Athletics	4–8	Chouinard	**Ware** (0–4)	—	20,124	32–41
74	June 23	@ Athletics	5–4	**Guzman** (6–5)	Wojciechowski	**Timlin** (14)	14,407	33–41
75	June 25	Mariners	8–7	**Crabtree** (3–2)	Charlton	—	31,420	34–41
76	June 26	Mariners	6–5	**Ware** (1–4)	Ayala	**Crabtree** (1)	30,158	35–41
77	June 27	Mariners	1–9	Wells	**Quantrill** (4–8)	—	31,108	35–42
78	June 28	Brewers	1–5	D'Amico	**Guzman** (6–6)	Fetters	31,333	35–43
79	June 29	Brewers	4–7	Karl	**Janzen** (4–3)	—	31,170	35–44
80	June 30	Brewers	15–2	**Hanson** (8–9)	Bones	—	30,104	36–44

July: 13–14 (Home: 7–7; Away: 6–7)

#	Date	Opponent	Score	Win	Loss	Save	Attendance	Record
81	July 1	Orioles	4–7	Coppinger	**Hentgen** (7–6)	Myers	43,377	36–45
82	July 2	Orioles	2–8	Erickson	**Quantrill** (4–9)	—	32,150	36–46
83	July 3	Orioles	5–2	**Guzman** (7–6)	Krivda	**Timlin** (15)	32,365	37–46
84	July 4	@ Tigers	1–6	Nitkowski	**Janzen** (4–4)	Myers	10,557	37–47
85	July 5	@ Tigers	3–4	Sager	**Hanson** (8–10)	Olson	20,808	37–48
86	July 6	@ Tigers	15–0	**Hentgen** (8–6)	Olivares	—	16,228	38–48
87	July 7	@ Tigers	0–9	Lira	**Ware** (1–5)	—	15,784	38–49
88	July 11	@ Brewers	6–3	**Guzman** (8–6)	D'Amico	**Castillo** (1)	16,019	39–49
89	July 12	@ Brewers	5–12	McDonald	**Hanson** (8–11)	—	15,691	39–50
90	July 13	@ Brewers	15–7	**Hentgen** (9–6)	Karl	—	29,383	40–50
91	July 14	@ Brewers	7–5 (10)	**Crabtree** (4–2)	Garcia	**Timlin** (16)	20,798	41–50
92	July 15	@ Orioles	6–8	Haynes	**Timlin** (0–2)	—	43,192	41–51
93	July 16	@ Orioles	6–0	**Guzman** (9–6)	Mussina	—	45,851	42–51
94	July 17	@ Orioles	10–11	Coppinger	**Timlin** (0–3)	—	45,955	42–52
95	July 18	Tigers	8–4	**Hentgen** (10–6)	Nitkowski	—	31,202	43–52
96	July 19	Tigers	6–8	Urbani	**Janzen** (4–5)	Olson	30,123	43–53
97	July 20	Tigers	4–5 (10)	Olson	**Quantrill** (4–10)	Lima	36,220	43–54
98	July 21	Tigers	5–4 (12)	**Spoljaric** (1–0)	Lima	—	33,238	44–54
99	July 22	Indians	2–4	Hershiser	**Hanson** (8–12)	Mesa	35,517	44–55
100	July 23	Indians	3–1	**Hentgen** (11–6)	Ogea	**Timlin** (17)	35,194	45–55
101	July 24	Indians	0–10	Martinez	**Janzen** (4–6)	—	35,218	45–56
102	July 25	Athletics	4–3	**Crabtree** (5–2)	Witasick	—	30,174	46–56
103	July 26	Athletics	3–5	Groom	**Castillo** (2–2)	Taylor	32,241	46–57
104	July 27	Athletics	6–4	**Hanson** (9–12)	Wasdin	**Timlin** (18)	32,162	47–57
105	July 28	Athletics	1–0	**Hentgen** (12–6)	Prieto	—	31,150	48–57
106	July 30	@ Indians	3–1	**Flener** (1–0)	Martinez	**Timlin** (19)	42,355	49–57
107	July 31	@ Indians	2–4	Assenmacher	**Timlin** (0–4)	—	42,301	49–58

August: 14–15 (Home: 5–9; Away: 9–6)

#	Date	Opponent	Score	Win	Loss	Save	Attendance	Record
108	August 1	@ Indians	5–3	**Hanson** (10–12)	Lopez	**Timlin** (20)	42,249	50–58
109	August 2	Angels	9–2	**Hentgen** (13–6)	Finley	—	30,261	51–58
110	August 3	Angels	6–11	Langston	**Castillo** (2–3)	—	32,139	51–59
111	August 4	Angels	7–1	**Flener** (2–0)	Abbott	—	30,253	52–59
112	August 5	@ Red Sox	1–3	Wakefield	**Guzman** (9–7)	—	23,884	52–60
113	August 6	@ Red Sox	2–3	Maddux	**Hanson** (10–13)	Slocumb	25,264	52–61
114	August 7	@ Red Sox	0–8	Gordon	**Hentgen** (13–7)	—	30,443	52–62
115	August 8	@ Red Sox	9–6	**Williams** (1–0)	Sele	**Timlin** (21)	32,696	53–62
116	August 9	Rangers	4–5	Witt	**Quantrill** (4–11)	Henneman	33,535	53–63
117	August 10	Rangers	1–12	Oliver	**Guzman** (9–8)	—	34,109	53–64
118	August 11	Rangers	0–6	Burkett	**Hanson** (10–14)	—	32,162	53–65
119	August 12	Red Sox	5–1	**Hentgen** (14–7)	Gordon	—	33,250	54–65
120	August 13	Red Sox	5–7	Brandenburg	**Williams** (1–1)	Slocumb	30,502	54–66
121	August 14	Red Sox	6–8	Belinda	**Crabtree** (5–3)	Slocumb	32,354	54–67
122	August 16	@ Twins	4–5 (10)	Parra	**Quantrill** (4–12)	—	19,838	54–68
123	August 17	@ Twins	1–11	Robertson	**Hanson** (10–15)	—	20,354	54–69
124	August 18	@ Twins	6–2	**Hentgen** (15–7)	Aguilera	—	18,010	55–69
125	August 19	@ Royals	2–1	**Spoljaric** (2–0)	Rosado	**Timlin** (22)	16,862	56–69
126	August 20	@ Royals	6–5 (14)	**Timlin** (1–4)	Huisman	—	14,568	57–69
127	August 21	@ Royals	6–2	**Guzman** (10–8)	Haney	—	12,238	58–69
128	August 22	@ White Sox	1–0 (6)	**Hanson** (11–15)	Fernandez	—	22,394	59–69
129	August 23	@ White Sox	4–2	**Hentgen** (16–7)	Ruffcorn	—	19,132	60–69
130	August 24	@ White Sox	9–2	**Williams** (2–1)	Baldwin	—	29,413	61–69
131	August 25	@ White Sox	9–10 (10)	Hernandez	**Timlin** (1–5)	—	19,647	61–70
132	August 26	Twins	5–3	**Guzman** (11–8)	Radke	**Timlin** (23)	31,134	62–70
133	August 27	Twins	4–6 (11)	Trombley	**Quantrill** (4–13)	—	30,033	62–71
134	August 28	Twins	6–1	**Hentgen** (17–7)	Aguilera	—	30,106	63–71
135	August 30	White Sox	2–11	Tapani	**Williams** (2–2)	—	30,072	63–72
136	August 31	White Sox	1–5	Alvarez	**Flener** (2–1)	—	32,141	63–73

September: 11–15 (Home: 5–10; Away: 6–5)

#	Date	Opponent	Score	Win	Loss	Save	Attendance	Record
137	September 1	White Sox	2–4 (11)	Hernandez	**Spoljaric** (2–1)	—	30,156	63–74
138	September 2	Royals	0–2	Belcher	**Hanson** (11–16)	—	28,177	63–75
139	September 3	Royals	2–5	Appier	**Hentgen** (17–8)	—	25,729	63–76
140	September 4	Royals	6–0	**Williams** (3–2)	Rosado	—	25,827	64–76
141	September 6	@ Yankees	3–4	Rivera	**Risley** (0–1)	—	21,528	64–77
142	September 7	@ Yankees	3–2	**Quantrill** (5–13)	Cone	**Timlin** (24)	27,069	65–77
143	September 8	@ Yankees	4–2	**Hanson** (12–16)	Pettitte	**Timlin** (25)	28,575	66–77
144	September 9	Rangers	3–4	Gross	**Hentgen** (17–9)	Henneman	25,825	66–78
145	September 10	Rangers	8–11	Oliver	**Williams** (3–3)	Henneman	26,286	66–79
146	September 11	Rangers	8–3	**Andujar** (1–0)	Vosberg	—	27,262	67–79
147	September 13	Yankees	1–4	Pettitte	**Hanson** (12–17)	Wetteland	31,227	67–80
148	September 14	Yankees	1–3	Boehringer	**Hentgen** (17–10)	Wetteland	43,397	67–81
149	September 15	Yankees	3–1	**Williams** (4–3)	Mendoza	**Timlin** (26)	36,268	68–81
150	September 16	Yankees	0–10	Key	**Quantrill** (5–14)	—	30,115	68–82
151	September 17	@ Brewers	0–4	McDonald	**Andujar** (1–1)	—	10,184	68–83
152	September 18	@ Brewers	1–2	Fetters	**Timlin** (1–6)	—	9,550	68–84
153	September 20	@ Orioles	5–1	**Hentgen** (18–10)	Krivda	**Spoljaric** (1)	47,026	69–84
154	September 21	@ Orioles	3–6	Coppinger	**Williams** (4–4)	Myers	47,270	69–85
155	September 22	@ Orioles	4–5	Erickson	**Flener** (2–2)	Benitez	46,035	69–86
156	September 23	@ Tigers	6–4	**Hanson** (13–17)	Sager	**Timlin** (27)	9,678	70–86
157	September 24	@ Tigers	4–1	**Hentgen** (19–10)	Miller	**Timlin** (28)	8,355	71–86
158	September 25	@ Tigers	13–11	**Brow** (1–0)	Cummings	**Timlin** (29)	8,055	72–86
159	September 26	Orioles	1–4	Coppinger	**Williams** (4–5)	Benitez	30,141	72–87
160	September 27	Orioles	3–2	**Flener** (3–2)	Erickson	**Timlin** (30)	30,116	73–87
161	September 28	Orioles	2–3 (10)	Myers	**Spoljaric** (2–2)	—	36,316	73–88
162	September 29	Orioles	4–1	**Hentgen** (20–10)	Rodriguez	**Timlin** (31)	38,267	74–88

Legend: = Win = Loss
Bold = Blue Jays team member

=== Detailed records ===
American League
Opponent	W	L	WP	RS	RA
AL East
Baltimore Orioles	5	8	0.385	55	58
Boston Red Sox	5	8	0.385	72	77
Detroit Tigers	7	6	0.538	81	71
New York Yankees	5	8	0.385	46	61
**Toronto Blue Jays**					
Total	22	30	0.423	254	267
AL Central
Chicago White Sox	5	7	0.417	46	55
Cleveland Indians	5	7	0.417	45	66
Kansas City Royals	8	5	0.615	51	40
Milwaukee Brewers	7	5	0.583	79	63
Minnesota Twins	5	8	0.385	44	59
Total	30	32	0.484	265	283
AL West
California Angels	5	7	0.417	61	58
Oakland Athletics	8	4	0.667	59	50
Seattle Mariners	7	5	0.583	82	79
Texas Rangers	2	10	0.167	45	72
Total	22	26	0.458	247	259
Season Total	74	88	0.457	766	809

Month	Games	Won	Lost	Win %	RS	RA
April	25	11	14	0.440	150	160
May	28	13	15	0.464	123	127
June	27	12	15	0.444	145	146
July	27	13	14	0.481	132	135
August	29	14	15	0.483	126	142
September	26	11	15	0.423	90	99
Total	162	74	88	0.457	766	809

	Games	Won	Lost	Win %	RS	RA
Home	81	35	46	0.432	364	433
Away	81	39	42	0.481	402	376
Total	162	74	88	0.457	766	809

=== Opening Day starters ===
- Tilson Brito
- Joe Carter
- Alex Gonzalez
- Pat Hentgen
- Otis Nixon
- Charlie O'Brien
- John Olerud
- Robert Pérez
- Juan Samuel
- Ed Sprague

=== Transactions ===
Transactions for the Toronto Blue Jays during the 1996 regular season.

==== May 1996 ====
May 5	Released Rubén Amaro Jr.
May 7	Selected Ken Robinson off of waivers from the Kansas City Royals.
May 15	Acquired Jacob Brumfield from the Pittsburgh Pirates for D.J. Boston.
May 17	Player rights of Randy Knorr sold to the Houston Astros.
May 24	Signed free agent Félix José from the Boston Red Sox to a minor-league contract.
May 27	Released Wes Chamberlain.

==== June 1996 ====
June 5	Released Frank Viola.
June 15	Signed amateur free agent Luis Lopez to a contract.

==== July 1996 ====
July 3	Signed amateur free agent César Izturis to a contract. Giovanni Carrara selected off of waivers by the Cincinnati Reds.

==== August 1996 ====
August 22	Acquired Luis Andújar and Allen Halley from the Chicago White Sox for Tony Castillo and Domingo Cedeño.

==== September 1996 ====
September 30	Scott Brow selected off of waivers by the Atlanta Braves.

=== 1996 MLB draft ===
- June 4, 1996: 1996 Major League Baseball draft
  - Billy Koch was drafted by the Blue Jays in the 1st round (4th pick). Player signed August 23, 1996.
  - Joe Lawrence was drafted by the Blue Jays in the 1st round (16th pick). Player signed July 1, 1996.
  - Orlando Hudson was drafted by the Toronto Blue Jays in the 33rd round, but did not sign.

=== Roster ===
1996 Toronto Blue Jays
**Roster**
**Pitchers**: 49 Luis Andújar; 60,32 Brian Bohanon; 27 Scott Brow; 38 Giovanni Carrara; 49 Tony Castillo; 37 Tim Crabtree; 38 Huck Flener; 57 Juan Guzmán; 39 Erik Hanson; 41 Pat Hentgen; 36 Marty Janzen; 50 Dane Johnson; 48 Paul Quantrill; 55 Bill Risley; 45 José Silva; 24 Paul Spoljaric; 40 Mike Timlin; 19 Frank Viola; 52 Jeff Ware; 54 Woody Williams	**Catchers**: 53,35 Sandy Martínez; 46 Julio Mosquera; 22 Charlie O'Brien; **Infielders**: 14 Tilson Brito; 3 Miguel Cairo; 20 Domingo Cedeño; 6 Felipe Crespo; 21 Carlos Delgado; 8 Alex Gonzalez; 9 John Olerud; 1 Tomás Pérez; 33 Ed Sprague	**Outfielders**: 5 Jacob Brumfield; 29 Joe Carter; 15 Shawn Green; 26 Mike Huff; 2 Otis Nixon; 17 Robert Pérez; 11 Juan Samuel; 7 Shannon Stewart	**Manager**: 43 Cito Gaston; **Coaches**: 4 Alfredo Griffin (first base); 16 Nick Leyva (third base); 34 Mel Queen (pitching); 18 Gene Tenace (bullpen); 28 Willie Upshaw (hitting)

=== Game log ===
1996 Game Log
April

#	Date	Opponent	Score	Win	Loss	Save	Attendance	Record
1	April 1	@ Athletics †	9 – 6	**Hanson** (1–0)	Reyes (0–1)	**Timlin** (1)	7,294	1–0
2	April 3	@ Athletics †	10 – 4	**Hentgen** (1–0)	Prieto (0–1)		8,050	2–0
3	April 5	@ Indians	7 – 1	**Guzmán** (1–0)	Hershiser (0–1)		41,782	3–0
4	April 6	@ Indians	5 – 3	Nagy (1–0)	**Hanson** (1-1)	Mesa (1)	41,852	3–1
5	April 7	@ Indians	8 – 3	Martínez (1-1)	**Quantrill** (0–1)		41,689	3–2
6	April 9	Angels	5 – 0	**Hentgen** (2–0)	Langston (0–1)		36,616	4–2
7	April 10	Angels	2 – 1	Holzemer (1–0)	**Guzmán** (1-1)	Percival (2)	25,446	4–3
8	April 11	Angels	7 – 4	**Hanson** (2–1)	Abbott (0–2)	**Timlin** (2)	25,512	5–3
9	April 12	Mariners	9 – 6	Hitchcock (3–0)	**Quantrill** (0–2)		31,293	5–4
10	April 13	Mariners	14 – 3	Bosio (1–0)	**Ware** (0–1)		33,645	5-5
11	April 14	Mariners	9 – 4	Wolcott (1-1)	**Hentgen** (2–1)		29,301	5–6
12	April 15	Tigers	8 – 2	**Guzmán** (2–1)	Olivares (1-1)		26,127	6-6
13	April 16	Tigers	13 – 8	Gohr (1–2)	**Hanson** (2-2)	Lewis (1)	25,503	6–7
14	April 17	@ Angels	5 – 1	Finley (3–1)	**Quantrill** (0–3)		15,361	6–8
15	April 18	@ Angels	9 – 6	James (3–1)	**Ware** (0–2)	Percival (4)	25,083	6–9
16	April 19	@ Mariners	10 – 4	**Hentgen** (3–1)	Wolcott (1–2)	**Bohanon** (1)	32,189	7–9
17	April 20	@ Mariners	3 – 1	**Guzmán** (3–1)	Menhart (0–2)	**Timlin** (3)	47,487	8–9
18	April 21	@ Mariners	9 – 5	Johnson (4–0)	**Hanson** (2–3)		34,915	8–10
19	April 22	@ Mariners	16 – 7	**Castillo** (1–0)	Hurtado (1–3)		18,467	9–10
20	April 24	Athletics	7 – 6	Prieto (1-1)	**Hentgen** (3–2)	Corsi (1)	28,029	9–11
21	April 25	Athletics	4 – 3 (11)	Mohler (2–0)	**Crabtree** (0–1)		26,163	9–12
22	April 26	Indians	6 – 3	Hershiser (2-2)	**Hanson** (2–4)	Mesa (8)	30,227	9–13
23	April 27	Indians	11 – 6	**Castillo** (2–0)	Nagy (3–1)		40,140	10–13
24	April 28	Indians	17 – 3	Lopez (1–0)	**Viola** (0–1)		31,143	10–14
25	April 30	Brewers	9 – 8	**Crabtree** (1-1)	Boze (0–1)		25,467	11–14

May

#	Date	Opponent	Score	Win	Loss	Save	Attendance	Record
26	May 1	Brewers	9 – 3	**Guzmán** (4–1)	Miranda (1-1)		25,684	12–14
27	May 2	Brewers	7 – 5	**Hanson** (3–4)	Karl (2-2)	**Timlin** (4)	31,299	13–14
28	May 3	@ Red Sox	8 – 7 ‡	Moyer (3–1)	**Quantrill** (0–4)	Slocumb (5)	25,570	13–15
29	May 4	@ Red Sox	8 – 4	Gordon (2-2)	**Viola** (0–2)	Slocumb (6)	29,785	13–16
30	May 5	@ Red Sox	11 – 4	**Hentgen** (4–2)	Wakefield (2–4)		29,866	14–16
31	May 7	@ Rangers	5 – 1	Oliver (2–0)	**Guzmán** (4–2)		23,005	14–17
32	May 8	@ Rangers	4 – 2	Witt (4–2)	**Hanson** (3–5)	Henneman (8)	20,694	14–18
33	May 9	@ Rangers	5 – 2	**Quantrill** (1–4)	Hill (4–3)	**Timlin** (5)	34,451	15–18
34	May 10	Red Sox	6 – 5 (11)	Slocumb (1-1)	**Carrara** (0–1)		31,159	15–19
35	May 11	Red Sox	9 – 8 (11)	**Quantrill** (2–4)	Knackert (0–1)		33,163	16–19
36	May 12	Red Sox	8 – 7 (10)	**Janzen** (1–0)	Slocumb (1–2)		31,188	17–19
37	May 14	@ Twins	4 – 2	**Hanson** (4–5)	Robertson (0–6)	**Timlin** (6)	13,483	18–19
38	May 15	@ Twins	2 – 1	Rodriguez (3–4)	**Hentgen** (4–3)		11,793	18–20
39	May 16	@ Twins	4 – 1	Radke (4–5)	**Quantrill** (2–5)	Stevens (8)	13,538	18–21
40	May 17	@ Royals	4 – 2	Belcher (4–2)	**Guzmán** (4–3)	Montgomery (10)	20,079	18–22
41	May 18	@ Royals	6 – 2	**Viola** (1–2)	Appier (3–4)		18,116	19–22
42	May 19	@ Royals	3 – 2	**Hanson** (5-5)	Gubicza (3–6)	**Timlin** (7)	15,039	20–22
43	May 20	@ Royals	5 – 4	Haney (3–4)	**Hentgen** (4-4)	Montgomery (11)	14,303	20–23
44	May 21	@ White Sox	2 – 1	Tapani (4–3)	**Ware** (0–3)	Hernández (12)	17,483	20–24
45	May 22	@ White Sox	2 – 1 (11)	McCaskill (3–2)	**Timlin** (0–1)		17,882	20–25
46	May 23	Twins	5 – 4 (10)	**Janzen** (2–0)	Milchin (1-1)		31,163	21–25
47	May 24	Twins	4 – 0	Robertson (1–7)	**Hanson** (5–6)		33,141	21–26
48	May 25	Twins	6 – 4 (10)	Guardado (2-2)	**Castillo** (2–1)	Stevens (9)	34,118	21–27
49	May 26	Twins	9 – 3	Naulty (3–0)	**Bohanon** (0–1)		30,170	21–28
50	May 27	White Sox	5 – 4	**Janzen** (3–0)	Fernandez (5–3)	**Timlin** (8)	30,013	22–28
51	May 28	White Sox	8 – 5	Baldwin (4–1)	**Viola** (1–3)	Hernández (15)	30,104	22–29
52	May 29	White Sox	6 – 5	**Hanson** (6-6)	Magrane (1-1)	**Timlin** (9)	31,074	23–29
53	May 31	Royals	4 – 2	**Hentgen** (5–4)	Gubicza (4–7)	**Timlin** (10)	33,194	24–29

June

#	Date	Opponent	Score	Win	Loss	Save	Attendance	Record
54	June 1	Royals	5 – 3 (10)	**Crabtree** (2–1)	Montgomery (1–3)		31,107	25–29
55	June 2	Royals	7 – 5	Belcher (6–2)	**Janzen** (3–1)	Montgomery (14)	32,253	25–30
56	June 4	@ Yankees	5 – 4	Gooden (4-4)	**Hanson** (6–7)	Wetteland (13)	17,368	25–31
57	June 5	@ Yankees	12 – 7	**Hentgen** (6–4)	Key (2–6)		17,142	26–31
58	June 6	@ Yankees	8 – 1	Pettitte (9–3)	**Quantrill** (2–6)		18,475	26–32
59	June 7	@ Rangers	10 – 7	Pavlik (8–1)	**Janzen** (3–2)	Henneman (17)	40,046	26–33
60	June 8	@ Rangers	2 – 0	Oliver (5–2)	**Guzmán** (4-4)		43,439	26–34
61	June 9	@ Rangers	8 – 6	Witt (6–4)	**Hanson** (6–8)	Henneman (18)	41,605	26–35
62	June 10	Yankees	5 – 3	Key (3–6)	**Hentgen** (6–5)	Wetteland (15)	37,332	26–36
63	June 11	Yankees	6 – 4	Pettitte (10–3)	**Quantrill** (2–7)	Wetteland (16)	32,114	26–37
64	June 12	Yankees	7 – 4	**Janzen** (4–2)	Mendoza (1–2)		44,238	27–37
65	June 13	@ Angels	6 – 4	Finley (8–4)	**Guzmán** (4–5)	James (1)	20,528	27–38
66	June 14	@ Angels	7 – 4	Grimsley (4–5)	**Hanson** (6–9)	Percival (17)	18,503	27–39
67	June 15	@ Angels	7 – 5	Langston (4–2)	**Crabtree** (2-2)	Percival (18)	40,352	27–40
68	June 16	@ Angels	6 – 4	**Quantrill** (3–7)	Abbott (1–10)	**Timlin** (11)	22,979	28–40
69	June 18	@ Mariners	11 – 3	**Guzmán** (5-5)	Wolcott (5–7)		25,912	29–40
70	June 19	@ Mariners	9 – 2	**Hanson** (7–9)	Harikkala (0–1)		26,265	30–40
71	June 20	@ Athletics	1 – 0	**Hentgen** (7–5)	Wengert (2–5)	**Timlin** (12)	8,027	31–40
72	June 21	@ Athletics	7 – 5	**Quantrill** (4–7)	Johns (4–9)	**Timlin** (13)	10,278	32–40
73	June 22	@ Athletics	8 – 4	Chouinard (1–2)	**Ware** (0–4)		20,124	32–41
74	June 23	@ Athletics	5 – 4	**Guzmán** (6–5)	Wojciechowski (5-5)	**Timlin** (14)	14,407	33–41
75	June 25	Mariners	8 – 7	**Crabtree** (3–2)	Charlton (2-2)		31,420	34–41
76	June 26	Mariners	6 – 5	**Ware** (1–4)	Ayala (0–1)	**Crabtree** (1)	30,158	35–41
77	June 27	Mariners	9 – 1	Wells (9–1)	**Quantrill** (4–8)		31,108	35–42
78	June 28	Brewers	5 – 1	D'Amico (1–0)	**Guzmán** (6-6)	Fetters (13)	31,333	35–43
79	June 29	Brewers	7 – 4	Karl (8–3)	**Janzen** (4–3)		31,170	35–44
80	June 30	Brewers	15 – 2	**Hanson** (8–9)	Bones (6–9)		30,104	36–44

July

#	Date	Opponent	Score	Win	Loss	Save	Attendance	Record
81	July 1	Orioles	7 – 4	Coppinger (3–0)	**Hentgen** (7–6)	Myers (16)	43,377	36–45
82	July 2	Orioles	8 – 2	Erickson (5–6)	**Quantrill** (4–9)		32,150	36–46
83	July 3	Orioles	5 – 2	**Guzmán** (7–6)	Krivda (2–4)	**Timlin** (15)	32,365	37–46
84	July 4	@ Tigers	6 – 1	Nitkowski (1–0)	**Janzen** (4-4)	Myers (3)	10,557	37–47
85	July 5	@ Tigers	4 – 3	Sager (1-1)	**Hanson** (8–10)	Olson (4)	20,808	37–48
86	July 6	@ Tigers	15 – 0	**Hentgen** (8–6)	Olivares (4–5)		16,228	38–48
87	July 7	@ Tigers	9 – 0	Lira (6–7)	**Ware** (1–5)		15,784	38–49
88	July 11	@ Brewers	6 – 3	**Guzmán** (8–6)	D'Amico (1–2)	**Castillo** (1)	16,019	39–49
89	July 12	@ Brewers	12 – 5	McDonald (10–3)	**Hanson** (8–11)		15,691	39–50
90	July 13	@ Brewers	15 – 7	**Hentgen** (9–6)	Karl (8–5)		29,383	40–50
91	July 14	@ Brewers	7 – 5 (10)	**Crabtree** (4–2)	García (3-3)	**Timlin** (16)	20,798	41–50
92	July 15	@ Orioles	8 – 6	Haynes (3–5)	**Timlin** (0–2)		43,192	41–51
93	July 16	@ Orioles	6 – 0	**Guzmán** (9–6)	Mussina (11–7)		45,851	42–51
94	July 17	@ Orioles	11 – 10	Coppinger (5–0)	**Timlin** (0–3)		45,955	42–52
95	July 18	Tigers	8 – 4	**Hentgen** (10–6)	Nitkowski (1–2)		31,202	43–52
96	July 19	Tigers	8 – 6	Urbani (2-2)	**Janzen** (4–5)	Olson (6)	30,123	43–53
97	July 20	Tigers	5 – 4 (10)	Olson (2–0)	**Quantrill** (4–10)	Lima (1)	36,220	43–54
98	July 21	Tigers	5 – 4 (12)	**Spoljaric** (1–0)	Lima (0–5)		33,238	44–54
99	July 22	Indians	4 – 2	Hershiser (10–6)	**Hanson** (8–12)	Mesa (25)	35,517	44–55
100	July 23	Indians	3 – 1	**Hentgen** (11–6)	Ogea (5–2)	**Timlin** (17)	35,194	45–55
101	July 24	Indians	10 – 0	Martínez (9–5)	**Janzen** (4–6)		35,218	45–56
102	July 25	Athletics	4 – 3	**Crabtree** (5–2)	Witasick (0–1)		30,174	46–56
103	July 26	Athletics	5 – 3	Groom (5–0)	**Castillo** (2-2)	Taylor (11)	32,241	46–57
104	July 27	Athletics	6 – 4	**Hanson** (9–12)	Wasdin (6–3)	**Timlin** (18)	32,162	47–57
105	July 28	Athletics	1 – 0	**Hentgen** (12–6)	Prieto (2–4)		31,150	48–57
106	July 30	@ Indians	3 – 1	**Flener** (1–0)	Martínez (9–6)	**Timlin** (19)	42,355	49–57
107	July 31	@ Indians	4 – 2	Assenmacher (2–1)	**Timlin** (0–4)		42,301	49–58

August

#	Date	Opponent	Score	Win	Loss	Save	Attendance	Record
108	August 1	@ Indians	5 – 3	**Hanson** (10–12)	Lopez (1–3)	**Timlin** (20)	42,249	50–58
109	August 2	Angels	9 – 2	**Hentgen** (13–6)	Finley (11–9)		30,261	51–58
110	August 3	Angels	11 – 6	Langston (6–4)	**Castillo** (2–3)		32,139	51–59
111	August 4	Angels	7 – 1	**Flener** (2–0)	Abbott (1–14)		30,253	52–59
112	August 5	@ Red Sox	3 – 1	Wakefield (9–10)	**Guzmán** (9–7)		23,884	52–60
113	August 6	@ Red Sox	3 – 2	Maddux (1-1)	**Hanson** (10–13)	Slocumb (16)	25,264	52–61
114	August 7	@ Red Sox	8 – 0	Gordon (9–5)	**Hentgen** (13–7)		30,443	52–62
115	August 8	@ Red Sox	9 – 6	**Williams** (1–0)	Sele (5–9)	**Timlin** (21)	32,696	53–62
116	August 9	Rangers	5 – 4	Witt (11–8)	**Quantrill** (4–11)	Henneman (24)	33,535	53–63
117	August 10	Rangers	12 – 1	Oliver (10–5)	**Guzmán** (9–8)		34,109	53–64
118	August 11	Rangers	6 – 0	Burkett (1–0)	**Hanson** (10–14)		32,162	53–65
119	August 12	Red Sox	5 – 1	**Hentgen** (14–7)	Gordon (9–6)		33,250	54–65
120	August 13	Red Sox	7 – 5	Brandenburg (3-3)	**Williams** (1-1)	Slocumb (18)	30,502	54–66
121	August 14	Red Sox	8 – 6	Belinda (2–1)	**Crabtree** (5–3)	Slocumb (19)	32,354	54–67
122	August 16	@ Twins	5 – 4 (10)	Parra (4–3)	**Quantrill** (4–12)		19,838	54–68
123	August 17	@ Twins	11 – 1	Robertson (6–11)	**Hanson** (10–15)		20,354	54–69
124	August 18	@ Twins	6 – 2	**Hentgen** (15–7)	Aguilera (6–5)		18,010	55–69
125	August 19	@ Royals	2 – 1	**Spoljaric** (2–0)	Rosado (4–3)	**Timlin** (22)	16,862	56–69
126	August 20	@ Royals	6 – 5 (14)	**Timlin** (1–4)	Huisman (0–1)		14,568	57–69
127	August 21	@ Royals	6 – 2	**Guzmán** (10–8)	Haney (9–12)		12,238	58–69
128	August 22	@ White Sox	1 – 0 (7)	**Hanson** (11–15)	Fernandez (12–8)		22,394	59–69
129	August 23	@ White Sox	4 – 2	**Hentgen** (16–7)	Ruffcorn (0–1)		19,132	60–69
130	August 24	@ White Sox	9 – 2	**Williams** (2–1)	Baldwin (9–4)		29,413	61–69
131	August 25	@ White Sox	10 – 9 (10)	Hernández (5–1)	**Timlin** (1–5)		19,647	61–70
132	August 26	Twins	5 – 3	**Guzmán** (11–8)	Radke (8–14)	**Timlin** (23)	31,134	62–70
133	August 27	Twins	6 – 4 (11)	Trombley (4–1)	**Quantrill** (4–13)		30,033	62–71
134	August 28	Twins	6 – 1	**Hentgen** (17–7)	Aguilera (7–6)		30,106	63–71
135	August 30	White Sox	11 – 2	Tapani (12–8)	**Williams** (2-2)		30,072	63–72
136	August 31	White Sox	5 – 1	Álvarez (15–7)	**Flener** (2–1)		32,141	63–73

September

#	Date	Opponent	Score	Win	Loss	Save	Attendance	Record
137	September 1	White Sox	4 – 2 (11)	Hernández (6–1)	**Spoljaric** (2–1)		30,156	63–74
138	September 2	Royals	2 – 0	Belcher (13–8)	**Hanson** (11–16)		28,177	63–75
139	September 3	Royals	5 – 2	Appier (12–10)	**Hentgen** (17–8)		25,729	63–76
140	September 4	Royals	6 – 0	**Williams** (3–2)	Rosado (5-5)		25,827	64–76
141	September 6	@ Yankees	4 – 3	Rivera (5–2)	**Risley** (0–1)		21,528	64–77
142	September 7	@ Yankees	3 – 2	**Quantrill** (5–13)	Cone (5–2)	**Timlin** (24)	27,069	65–77
143	September 8	@ Yankees	4 – 2	**Hanson** (12–16)	Pettitte (20–8)	**Timlin** (25)	28,575	66–77
144	September 9	Rangers	4 – 3	Gross (11–8)	**Hentgen** (17–9)	Henneman (29)	25,825	66–78
145	September 10	Rangers	11 – 8	Oliver (12–6)	**Williams** (3-3)	Henneman (30)	26,286	66–79
146	September 11	Rangers	8 – 3	**Andújar** (1–2)	Vosberg (1-1)		27,262	67–79
147	September 13	Yankees	4 – 1	Pettitte (21–8)	**Hanson** (12–17)	Wetteland (40)	31,227	67–80
148	September 14	Yankees	3 – 1	Boehringer (2–3)	**Hentgen** (17–10)	Wetteland (41)	43,397	67–81
149	September 15	Yankees	3 – 1	**Williams** (4–3)	Mendoza (3–5)	**Timlin** (26)	36,268	68–81
150	September 16	Yankees	10 – 0	Key (12–10)	**Quantrill** (5–14)		30,115	68–82
151	September 17	@ Brewers	4 – 0	McDonald (12–10)	**Andújar** (1–3)		10,184	68–83
152	September 18	@ Brewers	2 – 1	Fetters (3–2)	**Timlin** (1–6)		9,550	68–84
153	September 20	@ Orioles	5 – 1	**Hentgen** (18–10)	Krivda (2–5)	**Spoljaric** (1)	47,026	69–84
154	September 21	@ Orioles	6 – 3	Coppinger (9–6)	**Williams** (4-4)	Myers (31)	47,270	69–85
155	September 22	@ Orioles	5 – 4	Erickson (13–11)	**Flener** (2-2)	Benítez (2)	46,035	69–86
156	September 23	@ Tigers	6 – 4	**Hanson** (13–17)	Sager (4–5)	**Timlin** (27)	9,678	70–86
157	September 24	@ Tigers	4 – 1	**Hentgen** (19–10)	Miller (0–4)	**Timlin** (28)	8,355	71–86
158	September 25	@ Tigers	13 – 11	**Brow** (1–0)	Cummings (3–2)	**Timlin** (29)	8,055	72–86
159	September 26	Orioles	4 – 1	Coppinger (10–6)	**Williams** (4–5)	Benítez (4)	30,141	72–87
160	September 27	Orioles	3 – 2	**Flener** (3–2)	Erickson (13–12)	**Timlin** (30)	30,116	73–87
161	September 28	Orioles	3 – 2 (10)	Myers (4-4)	**Spoljaric** (2-2)		36,316	73–88
162	September 29	Orioles	4 – 1	**Hentgen** (20–10)	Rodríguez (0–1)	**Timlin** (31)	38,267	74–88

- † At Cashman Field in Las Vegas, Nevada.
- ‡ Game suspended due to curfew after the 6th inning. Completed on May 4.

== Player stats ==
= Indicates team leader

=== Batting ===
==== Starters by position ====
Note: Pos = Position; G = Games played; AB = At bats; H = Hits; Avg. = Batting average; HR = Home runs; RBI = Runs batted in; SB = Stolen bases

Pos	Player	G	AB	R	H	Avg.	HR	RBI	SB
C	Charlie O'Brien	109	324	33	77	.238	13	44	0
1B	John Olerud	125	398	59	109	.274	18	61	1
2B	Tomás Pérez	91	295	24	74	.251	1	19	1
3B	Ed Sprague	159	591	88	146	.247	36	101	0
SS	Alex Gonzalez	147	527	64	124	.235	14	64	16
LF	Joe Carter	157	625	84	158	.253	30	107	7
CF	Otis Nixon	125	496	87	142	.286	1	29	54
RF	Shawn Green	132	422	52	118	.280	11	45	5
DH	Carlos Delgado	138	488	68	132	.270	25	92	0

==== Other batters ====
Note: G = Games played; AB = At bats; H = Hits; Avg. = Batting average; HR = Home runs; RBI = Runs batted in

Player	G	AB	H	Avg.	HR	RBI
Jacob Brumfield	90	308	79	.256	12	52
Domingo Cedeño	77	282	79	.280	2	17
Sandy Martínez	76	229	52	.227	3	18
Robert Pérez	86	202	66	.327	2	21
Juan Samuel	69	188	48	.255	8	26
Tilson Brito	26	80	19	.238	1	7
Felipe Crespo	22	49	9	.184	0	4
Mike Huff	11	29	5	.172	0	0
Miguel Cairo	9	27	6	.222	0	1
Julio Mosquera	8	22	5	.227	0	2
Shannon Stewart	7	17	3	.176	0	2

=== Pitching ===
==== Starting pitchers ====
Note: G = Games pitched; IP = Innings pitched; W = Wins; L = Losses; ERA = Earned run average; SO = Strikeouts

Player	G	IP	W	L	ERA	SO
Pat Hentgen	35	265.2	20	10	3.22	177
Erik Hanson	35	214.2	13	17	5.41	156
Juan Guzmán	27	187.2	11	8	2.93	165
Frank Viola	6	30.1	1	3	7.71	18

==== Other pitchers ====
Note: G = Games pitched; IP = Innings pitched; W = Wins; L = Losses; ERA = Earned run average; SO = Strikeouts

Player	G	IP	W	L	ERA	SO
Paul Quantrill	38	134.1	5	14	5.43	86
Marty Janzen	15	73.2	4	6	7.33	47
Huck Flener	15	70.2	3	2	4.58	44
Woody Williams	12	59.0	4	5	4.73	43
Jeff Ware	13	32.2	1	5	9.09	11
Luis Andújar	3	14.1	1	1	5.02	5

==== Relief pitchers ====
Note: G = Games pitched; W = Wins; L = Losses; SV = Saves; ERA = Earned run average; SO = Strikeouts

Player	G	W	L	SV	ERA	SO
Mike Timlin	59	1	6	31	3.65	52
Tim Crabtree	53	5	3	1	2.54	57
Tony Castillo	40	2	3	1	4.23	48
Paul Spoljaric	28	2	2	1	3.08	38
Bill Risley	25	0	1	0	3.89	29
Brian Bohanon	20	0	1	1	7.77	17
Scott Brow	18	1	0	0	5.59	23
Giovanni Carrara	11	0	1	0	11.40	10
Dane Johnson	10	0	0	0	3.00	7
José Silva	2	0	0	0	13.50	0

== Award winners ==
- Juan Guzmán, Pitcher of the Month Award, April
- Juan Guzmán, American League ERA Leader, 2.93
- Pat Hentgen, Pitcher of the Month Award, July
- Pat Hentgen, Pitcher of the Month Award, August
- Pat Hentgen, Cy Young Award

All-Star Game

- Joe Carter, OF
  - Joe Carter received boos at the All-Star Game, as it took place at Veterans Stadium, the home of the Philadelphia Phillies, for his home run that ended the 1993 World Series.

== Farm system ==
Level	Team	League	Manager
AAA	Syracuse Chiefs	International League	Richie Hebner
AA	Knoxville Smokies	Southern League	Omar Malavé
A	Dunedin Blue Jays	Florida State League	Dennis Holmberg
A	Hagerstown Suns	South Atlantic League	J. J. Cannon
A-Short Season	St. Catharines Stompers	New York–Penn League	Rocket Wheeler
Rookie	Medicine Hat Blue Jays	Pioneer League	Marty Pevey
