= 1996 Chicago White Sox season =

1996 Chicago White Sox
- League: American League
- Division: Central
- Ballpark: Comiskey Park
- City: Chicago
- Owners: Jerry Reinsdorf
- General managers: Ron Schueler
- Managers: Terry Bevington
- Television: WGN-TV; SportsChannel Chicago (Ken Harrelson, Tom Paciorek)
- Radio: WMVP (John Rooney, Ed Farmer); WIND (AM) (Hector Molina, Chico Carrasquel)

The 1996 Chicago White Sox season was the White Sox's 97th season. They finished with a record of 85–77, good enough for second place in the American League Central, 14.5 games behind the first place Cleveland Indians.

== Offseason ==
- December 28, 1995: Tim Raines was traded by the Chicago White Sox to the New York Yankees for a player to be named later. The New York Yankees sent Blaise Kozeniewski (minors) (February 6, 1996) to the Chicago White Sox to complete the trade.
- January 20, 1996: Tony Phillips was signed as a free agent with the Chicago White Sox.
- January 22, 1996: Danny Tartabull was traded by the Oakland Athletics to the Chicago White Sox for Andrew Lorraine and Charles Poe (minors).

== Regular season ==
=== Season standings ===
AL Central
Team	W	L	Pct.	GB	Home	Road
Cleveland Indians	99	62	.615	—	51‍–‍29	48‍–‍33
Chicago White Sox	85	77	.525	14½	44‍–‍37	41‍–‍40
Milwaukee Brewers	80	82	.494	19½	38‍–‍43	42‍–‍39
Minnesota Twins	78	84	.481	21½	39‍–‍43	39‍–‍41
Kansas City Royals	75	86	.466	24	37‍–‍43	38‍–‍43

=== Record vs. opponents ===
1996 American League record Source: MLB Standings Grid – 1996
Team	BAL	BOS	CAL	CWS	CLE	DET	KC	MIL	MIN	NYY	OAK	SEA	TEX	TOR
Baltimore	—	7–6	6–6	4–8	5–7	11–2	9–3	9–3	7–5	3–10	9–4	7–5	3–10–1	8–5
Boston	6–7	—	8–4	6–6	1–11	12–1	3–9	7–5	6–6	7–6	8–5	7–6	6–6	8–5
California	6–6	4–8	—	6–6	4–9	6–6	4–8	7–5	4–8	7–6	6–7	5–8	4–9	7–5
Chicago	8–4	6–6	6–6	—	5–8	10–3	7–6	6–7	6–7	6–7	5–7	5–7	8–4	7–5
Cleveland	7–5	11–1	9–4	8–5	—	12–0	7–6	7–6	10–3	3–9	6–6	8–4	4–8	7–5
Detroit	2–11	1–12	6–6	3–10	0–12	—	6–6	4–8	6–6	5–8	4–8	6–6	4–9	6–7
Kansas City	3–9	9–3	8–4	6–7	6–7	6–6	—	4–9	6–7	4–8	5–7	7–5	6–6	5–8
Milwaukee	3–9	5–7	5–7	7–6	6–7	8–4	9–4	—	9–4	6–6	7–5	4–9	6–7	5–7
Minnesota	5–7	6–6	8–4	7–6	3–10	6–6	7–6	4–9	—	5–7	6–7	6–6	7–5	8–5
New York	10–3	6–7	6–7	7–6	9–3	8–5	8–4	6–6	7–5	—	9–3	3–9	5–7	8–5
Oakland	4–9	5–8	7–6	7–5	6–6	8–4	7–5	5–7	7–6	3–9	—	8–5	7–6	4–8
Seattle	5–7	6–7	8–5	7–5	4–8	6–6	5–7	9–4	6–6	9–3	5–8	—	10–3	5–7
Texas	10–3–1	6–6	9–4	4–8	8–4	9–4	6–6	7–6	5–7	7–5	6–7	3–10	—	10–2
Toronto	5–8	5–8	5–7	5–7	5–7	7–6	8–5	7–5	5–8	5–8	8–4	7–5	2–10	—

=== Game log ===
1996 Game Log: 85–77 (Home: 44–37; Away: 41–40)
March: 0–1 (Home: 0–0; Away: 0–1)

#	Date	Opponent	Score	Win	Loss	Save	Attendance	Record
1	March 31	@ Mariners	2–3 (12)	Hurtado	**Simas** (0–1)	—	57,467	0–1

April: 15–9 (Home: 7–3; Away: 8–6)

#	Date	Opponent	Score	Win	Loss	Save	Attendance	Record
2	April 2	@ Mariners	2–3	Hitchcock	**Alvarez** (0–1)	Charlton	38,570	0–2
3	April 3	@ Mariners	4–2	**Magrane** (1–0)	Wolcott	**Hernandez** (1)	22,783	1–2
4	April 5	@ Angels	6–7 (11)	James	**McCaskill** (0–1)	—	22,812	1–3
5	April 6	@ Angels	8–4	**Fernandez** (1–0)	Abbott	—	26,447	2–3
6	April 7	@ Angels	5–6	Finley	**Alvarez** (0–2)	Percival	16,970	2–4
7	April 9	Rangers	2–3	Gross	**Thomas** (0–1)	Henneman	34,750	2–5
8	April 11	Rangers	8–5 (11)	**Thomas** (1–1)	Henneman	—	16,685	3–5
9	April 12	Athletics	2–7	Reyes	**Fernandez** (1–1)	—	13,623	3–6
10	April 13	Athletics	6–5 (12)	**Karchner** (1–0)	Wengert	—	15,812	4–6
11	April 14	Athletics	5–10	Groom	**Simas** (0–2)	—	15,236	4–7
12	April 15	@ Royals	11–10	**Karchner** (2–0)	Pichardo	**Hernandez** (2)	12,653	5–7
13	April 16	@ Royals	5–6	Belcher	**Bere** (0–1)	Montgomery	12,399	5–8
14	April 17	@ Royals	3–1	**Fernandez** (2–1)	Appier	**Hernandez** (3)	13,350	6–8
15	April 19	@ Athletics	4–3	**Karchner** (3–0)	Briscoe	**Hernandez** (4)	31,320	7–8
16	April 20	@ Athletics	8–3	**Tapani** (1–0)	Van Poppel	—	16,480	8–8
17	April 21	@ Athletics	5–6	Corsi	**Simas** (0–3)	Mohler	16,125	8–9
18	April 22	@ Rangers	12–4	**Fernandez** (3–1)	Witt	**Karchner** (1)	22,348	9–9
19	April 23	@ Rangers	6–5	**Baldwin** (1–0)	Hill	**Hernandez** (5)	29,123	10–9
20	April 24	Mariners	2–1	**Alvarez** (1–2)	Bosio	**Hernandez** (6)	15,882	11–9
21	April 25	Mariners	4–3	**Tapani** (2–0)	Wolcott	**Hernandez** (7)	14,679	12–9
	April 26	Angels	Postponed (rain) Rescheduled for June 24					12–9
22	April 27	Angels	2–1	**Fernandez** (4–1)	Abbott	**Hernandez** (8)	18,139	13–9
23	April 28	Angels	10–1	**Baldwin** (2–0)	Finley	—	15,574	14–9
24	April 29	Angels	4–3	**Alvarez** (2–2)	Grimsley	**Hernandez** (9)	12,549	15–9
25	April 30	@ Indians	3–5	Martinez	**Tapani** (2–1)	Mesa	40,268	15–10

May: 17–10 (Home: 11–2; Away: 6–8)

#	Date	Opponent	Score	Win	Loss	Save	Attendance	Record
26	May 1	@ Indians	5–9	McDowell	**McCaskill** (0–2)	Plunk	40,447	15–11
27	May 2	@ Yankees	1–5	Cone	**Fernandez** (4–2)	—	19,773	15–12
28	May 3	@ Yankees	0–2	Rivera	**Thomas** (1–2)	Wetteland	15,599	15–13
29	May 4	@ Yankees	11–5	**Karchner** (4–0)	Nelson	—	20,661	16–13
30	May 5	@ Yankees	1–7	Pettitte	**Tapani** (2–2)	—	26,525	16–14
31	May 7	Orioles	3–2	**Fernandez** (5–2)	Wells	**Hernandez** (10)	16,130	17–14
32	May 8	Orioles	11–2	**Baldwin** (3–0)	Erickson	—	14,974	18–14
33	May 9	Orioles	4–6	Mussina	**Alvarez** (2–3)	Myers	14,507	18–15
34	May 10	Yankees	5–2	**Tapani** (3–2)	Pettitte	**Hernandez** (11)	15,784	19–15
35	May 11	Yankees	7–5	**McCaskill** (1–2)	Wetteland	—	25,722	20–15
36	May 12	Yankees	8–9	Wickman	**Thomas** (1–3)	Wetteland	17,405	20–16
37	May 13	@ Brewers	2–6	Sparks	**Baldwin** (3–1)	Boze	9,544	20–17
	May 14	@ Brewers	Postponed (rain) Rescheduled for August 16					20–17
38	May 15	@ Brewers	20–8	**Alvarez** (3–3)	Bones	**Keyser** (1)	8,733	21–17
39	May 16	@ Brewers	2–3	Lloyd	**Tapani** (3–3)	Fetters	13,849	21–18
40	May 17	@ Tigers	11–6 (10)	**Hernandez** (1–0)	Lewis	—	12,094	22–18
41	May 18	@ Tigers	16–4	**McCaskill** (2–2)	Farrell	**Simas** (1)	21,673	23–18
42	May 19	@ Tigers	14–3	**Alvarez** (4–3)	Gohr	—	9,709	24–18
43	May 21	Blue Jays	2–1	**Tapani** (4–3)	Ware	**Hernandez** (12)	17,483	25–18
44	May 22	Blue Jays	2–1 (11)	**McCaskill** (3–2)	Timlin	—	17,882	26–18
45	May 24	Brewers	4–3	**Thomas** (2–3)	Sparks	**Hernandez** (13)	18,346	27–18
46	May 25	Brewers	9–7	**Alvarez** (5–3)	Bones	**Hernandez** (14)	20,585	28–18
47	May 26	Brewers	12–1	**Tapani** (5–3)	McDonald	—	21,151	29–18
48	May 27	@ Blue Jays	4–5	Janzen	**Fernandez** (5–3)	Timlin	30,013	29–19
49	May 28	@ Blue Jays	8–5	**Baldwin** (4–1)	Viola	**Hernandez** (15)	30,104	30–19
50	May 29	@ Blue Jays	5–6	Hanson	**Magrane** (1–1)	Timlin	31,074	30–20
51	May 30	Tigers	8–2	**Alvarez** (6–3)	Olivares	—	17,339	31–20
52	May 31	Tigers	9–0	**Tapani** (6–3)	Lira	—	16,983	32–20

June: 14–14 (Home: 8–8; Away: 6–6)

#	Date	Opponent	Score	Win	Loss	Save	Attendance	Record
	June 1	Tigers	Postponed (rain) Rescheduled for June 2					32–20
53	June 2	Tigers	4–2	**Baldwin** (5–1)	Thompson	**Hernandez** (16)	—	33–20
54	June 2	Tigers	13–5	**McCaskill** (4–2)	Keagle	—	26,125	34–20
55	June 4	@ Red Sox	6–4	**Alvarez** (7–3)	Gunderson	**Hernandez** (17)	23,715	35–20
56	June 5	@ Red Sox	8–6 (12)	**Keyser** (1–0)	Slocumb	—	24,246	36–20
57	June 6	@ Red Sox	4–7	Eshelman	**Magrane** (1–2)	Stanton	24,382	36–21
58	June 7	@ Orioles	8–2	**Fernandez** (6–3)	Erickson	—	47,209	37–21
59	June 8	@ Orioles	2–1	**Baldwin** (6–1)	Mercker	**Hernandez** (18)	47,634	38–21
60	June 9	@ Orioles	12–9	**Karchner** (5–0)	Mussina	**Hernandez** (19)	47,352	39–21
61	June 10	Red Sox	8–2	**Tapani** (7–3)	Wakefield	—	21,799	40–21
62	June 11	Red Sox	2–9	Eshelman	**Magrane** (1–3)	—	20,792	40–22
63	June 12	Red Sox	2–3 (12)	Hudson	**Karchner** (5–1)	—	21,139	40–23
64	June 14	@ Mariners	4–1	**Alvarez** (8–3)	Hitchcock	**Hernandez** (20)	30,163	41–23
65	June 15	@ Mariners	6–8 (12)	Carmona	**McCaskill** (4–3)	—	47,042	41–24
66	June 16	@ Mariners	6–7	Wells	**Magrane** (1–4)	Jackson	34,588	41–25
67	June 17	@ Angels	8–9 (13)	Hancock	**McCaskill** (4–4)	—	17,836	41–26
68	June 18	@ Angels	4–5	Finley	**Simas** (0–4)	Percival	19,213	41–27
69	June 19	@ Angels	2–14	McElroy	**Alvarez** (8–4)	—	22,960	41–28
70	June 20	Mariners	5–8	Hitchcock	**Tapani** (7–4)	Charlton	23,017	41–29
71	June 21	Mariners	2–12	Wagner	**Magrane** (1–5)	—	23,253	41–30
72	June 22	Mariners	2–4	Wells	**Fernandez** (6–4)	Charlton	27,036	41–31
73	June 23	Mariners	7–6 (10)	**McCaskill** (5–4)	Guetterman	—	26,768	42–31
74	June 24	Angels	4–2	**Alvarez** (9–4)	James	**Hernandez** (21)	—	43–31
75	June 24	Angels	4–6	Hancock	**Sirotka** (0–1)	Percival	24,469	43–32
76	June 25	Angels	3–2	**Tapani** (8–4)	Langston	**Hernandez** (22)	23,270	44–32
77	June 27	Indians	15–10	**Fernandez** (7–4)	Swindell	—	27,782	45–32
78	June 28	Indians	4–2	**Baldwin** (7–1)	Tavarez	**Hernandez** (23)	33,136	46–32
79	June 29	Indians	2–3 (10)	Shuey	**Karchner** (5–2)	—	43,601	46–33
80	June 30	Indians	2–4	Hershiser	**Tapani** (8–5)	Mesa	30,351	46–34

July: 12–15 (Home: 4–10; Away: 8–5)

#	Date	Opponent	Score	Win	Loss	Save	Attendance	Record
81	July 1	Twins	7–10	Aguilera	**Sirotka** (0–2)	—	19,211	46–35
82	July 2	Twins	7–4	**Fernandez** (8–4)	Aldred	**Hernandez** (24)	18,357	47–35
83	July 3	Twins	5–6	Radke	**Andujar** (0–1)	Stevens	26,113	47–36
84	July 4	@ Indians	6–5 (10)	**Karchner** (6–2)	Mesa	**Hernandez** (25)	42,355	48–36
85	July 5	@ Indians	7–0	**Alvarez** (10–4)	Hershiser	—	42,536	49–36
86	July 6	@ Indians	3–2	**Karchner** (7–2)	Shuey	**Hernandez** (26)	42,454	50–36
87	July 7	@ Indians	1–6	Ogea	**Fernandez** (8–5)	Assenmacher	42,343	50–37
88	July 11	@ Royals	2–3	Haney	**Alvarez** (10–5)	—	22,928	50–38
89	July 12	@ Royals	7–6	**Tapani** (9–5)	Belcher	**Hernandez** (27)	18,458	51–38
90	July 13	@ Royals	3–1	**Fernandez** (9–5)	Rosado	—	25,363	52–38
91	July 14	@ Royals	3–2	**Baldwin** (8–1)	Linton	**Hernandez** (28)	17,024	53–38
92	July 15	@ Twins	5–16	Aldred	**McCaskill** (5–5)	—	13,636	53–39
93	July 16	@ Twins	11–2	**Alvarez** (11–5)	Radke	—	18,502	54–39
94	July 17	@ Twins	3–4	Trombley	**Simas** (0–5)	—	20,755	54–40
95	July 18	Royals	1–7	Appier	**Fernandez** (9–6)	Pichardo	17,657	54–41
96	July 19	Royals	4–7 (10)	Montgomery	**Hernandez** (1–1)	—	19,604	54–42
97	July 20	Royals	5–7	Linton	**Keyser** (1–1)	Montgomery	32,282	54–43
98	July 21	Royals	6–3	**Alvarez** (12–5)	Haney	**Hernandez** (29)	21,253	55–43
99	July 22	Athletics	5–6	Taylor	**Karchner** (7–3)	—	23,572	55–44
100	July 23	Athletics	4–8	Wengert	**Fernandez** (9–7)	Corsi	18,527	55–45
101	July 24	Athletics	5–6	Corsi	**Simas** (0–6)	Taylor	23,350	55–46
102	July 25	Rangers	3–4 (12)	Russell	**Keyser** (1–2)	Henneman	19,524	55–47
103	July 26	Rangers	6–2	**Alvarez** (13–5)	Oliver	—	21,398	56–47
104	July 27	Rangers	4–6 (10)	Heredia	**Simas** (0–7)	Vosberg	22,629	56–48
105	July 28	Rangers	5–1	**Fernandez** (10–7)	Pavlik	—	20,902	57–48
106	July 30	@ Athletics	2–1	**Baldwin** (9–1)	Telgheder	**Hernandez** (30)	14,210	58–48
107	July 31	@ Athletics	4–5	Witasick	**Karchner** (7–4)	Taylor	13,127	58–49

August: 15–15 (Home: 6–7; Away: 9–8)

#	Date	Opponent	Score	Win	Loss	Save	Attendance	Record
108	August 1	@ Athletics	8–3	**Tapani** (10–5)	Wasdin	**Hernandez** (31)	10,514	59–49
109	August 2	@ Rangers	9–0	**Fernandez** (11–7)	Pavlik	—	36,299	60–49
110	August 3	@ Rangers	11–9	**Hernandez** (2–1)	Russell	—	46,481	61–49
111	August 4	@ Rangers	5–9	Witt	**Baldwin** (9–2)	—	32,854	61–50
112	August 5	@ Rangers	15–5	**Alvarez** (14–5)	Oliver	—	29,973	62–50
113	August 6	@ Yankees	2–9	Rogers	**Tapani** (10–6)	—	33,025	62–51
114	August 7	@ Yankees	8–4 (10)	**Hernandez** (3–1)	Nelson	—	31,098	63–51
115	August 8	@ Yankees	4–8	Wickman	**Andujar** (0–2)	Rivera	35,898	63–52
116	August 9	Orioles	4–3 (10)	**Simas** (1–7)	Myers	—	23,995	64–52
117	August 10	Orioles	4–13	Mussina	**Alvarez** (14–6)	McDowell	26,772	64–53
118	August 11	Orioles	8–5	**Tapani** (11–6)	Mills	**Hernandez** (32)	27,088	65–53
119	August 12	Yankees	3–2 (10)	**Hernandez** (4–1)	Wetteland	—	32,492	66–53
120	August 13	Yankees	8–4	**Bertotti** (1–0)	Weathers	—	26,455	67–53
121	August 14	Yankees	1–3	Pettitte	**Baldwin** (9–3)	Rivera	23,350	67–54
122	August 16	@ Brewers	7–9	Miranda	**Levine** (0–1)	Villone	—	67–55
123	August 16	@ Brewers	2–3	Van Egmond	**Tapani** (11–7)	Fetters	25,529	67–56
124	August 17	@ Brewers	6–2	**Fernandez** (12–7)	McDonald	**Hernandez** (33)	31,551	68–56
125	August 18	@ Brewers	7–8	Miranda	**Darwin** (0–1)	Fetters	33,094	68–57
126	August 19	@ Tigers	12–7	**Simas** (2–7)	Lima	—	14,690	69–57
127	August 20	@ Tigers	11–16	Lewis	**Tapani** (11–8)	—	12,119	69–58
128	August 21	@ Tigers	4–7	Lima	**Simas** (2–8)	Olson	13,424	69–59
129	August 22	Blue Jays	0–1 (6)	Hanson	**Fernandez** (12–8)	—	22,394	69–60
130	August 23	Blue Jays	2–4	Hentgen	**Ruffcorn** (0–1)	—	19,132	69–61
131	August 24	Blue Jays	2–9	Williams	**Baldwin** (9–4)	—	29,413	69–62
132	August 25	Blue Jays	10–9 (10)	**Hernandez** (5–1)	Timlin	—	19,647	70–62
133	August 26	Brewers	2–3	Eldred	**Alvarez** (14–7)	Jones	19,637	70–63
134	August 27	Brewers	2–4	Van Egmond	**Fernandez** (12–9)	Fetters	15,443	70–64
135	August 28	Brewers	2–0	**Baldwin** (10–4)	McDonald	**Hernandez** (34)	17,269	71–64
136	August 30	@ Blue Jays	11–2	**Tapani** (12–8)	Williams	—	30,072	72–64
137	August 31	@ Blue Jays	5–1	**Alvarez** (15–7)	Flener	—	32,141	73–64

September: 12–13 (Home: 8–7; Away: 4–6)

#	Date	Opponent	Score	Win	Loss	Save	Attendance	Record
138	September 1	@ Blue Jays	4–2 (11)	**Hernandez** (6–1)	Spoljaric	—	30,156	74–64
139	September 2	Tigers	6–8	Myers	**Hernandez** (6–2)	Lima	19,599	74–65
140	September 3	Tigers	6–4	**Bertotti** (2–0)	Olivares	**Hernandez** (35)	13,857	75–65
141	September 4	Tigers	11–6	**Castillo** (1–0)	Miller	—	15,120	76–65
142	September 6	Red Sox	3–10	Wakefield	**Alvarez** (15–8)	—	18,417	76–66
143	September 7	Red Sox	4–3	**Fernandez** (13–9)	Clemens	**Hernandez** (36)	28,219	77–66
144	September 8	Red Sox	7–4	**Baldwin** (11–4)	Sele	**Hernandez** (37)	19,983	78–66
145	September 10	@ Orioles	1–5	Wells	**Tapani** (12–9)	—	43,320	78–67
146	September 11	@ Orioles	6–7 (10)	Mills	**Hernandez** (6–3)	—	43,320	78–68
147	September 12	@ Orioles	11–3	**Fernandez** (14–9)	Mussina	—	47,342	79–68
148	September 13	@ Red Sox	5–9	Clemens	**Baldwin** (11–5)	Slocumb	28,907	79–69
149	September 14	@ Red Sox	13–5	**Castillo** (2–0)	Gordon	**Simas** (2)	31,841	80–69
150	September 15	@ Red Sox	8–9	Slocumb	**Hernandez** (6–4)	—	32,452	80–70
151	September 16	Indians	3–4	McDowell	**Alvarez** (15–9)	—	25,392	80–71
152	September 17	Indians	4–9	Anderson	**Fernandez** (14–10)	Plunk	18,763	80–72
153	September 18	Indians	3–4	Lopez	**Baldwin** (11–6)	Mesa	20,289	80–73
154	September 19	Twins	8–3	**Sirotka** (1–2)	Rodriguez	**Castillo** (1)	14,253	81–73
155	September 20	Twins	7–3	**Tapani** (13–9)	Robertson	—	15,673	82–73
156	September 21	Twins	3–4	Radke	**Alvarez** (15–10)	Trombley	18,866	82–74
157	September 22	Twins	5–1	**Fernandez** (15–10)	Aldred	—	20,111	83–74
158	September 24	Royals	3–2	**Castillo** (3–0)	Belcher	—	14,348	84–74
159	September 25	Royals	2–8	Appier	**Tapani** (13–10)	—	15,911	84–75
160	September 27	@ Twins	4–2	**Fernandez** (16–10)	Radke	**Hernandez** (38)	13,058	85–75
161	September 28	@ Twins	6–7	Trombley	**Castillo** (3–1)	—	34,008	85–76
162	September 29	@ Twins	4–5 (10)	Guardado	**Hernandez** (6–5)	—	13,306	85–77

Legend: = Win = Loss
Bold = White Sox team member

=== Detailed records ===
American League
Opponent	W	L	WP	RS	RA
AL East
Baltimore Orioles	8	4	0.667	74	58
Boston Red Sox	6	6	0.500	70	71
Detroit Tigers	10	3	0.769	125	70
New York Yankees	6	7	0.462	59	65
Toronto Blue Jays	7	5	0.583	55	46
Total	37	25	0.597	383	310
AL Central
**Chicago White Sox**					
Cleveland Indians	5	8	0.385	58	63
Kansas City Royals	7	6	0.538	55	63
Milwaukee Brewers	6	7	0.462	77	57
Minnesota Twins	6	7	0.462	75	67
Total	24	28	0.462	265	250
AL West
California Angels	6	6	0.500	60	60
Oakland Athletics	5	7	0.417	58	63
Seattle Mariners	5	7	0.417	46	58
Texas Rangers	8	4	0.667	86	53
Total	24	24	0.500	250	234
Season Total	85	77	0.525	898	794

Month	Games	Won	Lost	Win %	RS	RA
March	1	0	1	0.000	2	3
April	24	15	9	0.625	127	104
May	27	17	10	0.630	184	115
June	28	14	14	0.500	149	153
July	27	12	15	0.444	124	130
August	30	15	15	0.500	175	162
September	25	12	13	0.480	137	127
Total	162	85	77	0.525	898	794

	Games	Won	Lost	Win %	RS	RA
Home	81	44	37	0.543	398	370
Away	81	41	40	0.506	500	424
Total	162	85	77	0.525	898	794

=== 1996 Opening Day lineup ===
- Tony Phillips, LF
- Ray Durham, 2B
- Frank Thomas, 1B
- Danny Tartabull, RF
- Lyle Mouton, DH
- Robin Ventura, 3B
- Ron Karkovice, C
- Darren Lewis, CF
- Ozzie Guillén, SS
- Alex Fernandez, P

=== Transactions ===
- August 31, 1996: Marvin Freeman was selected off waivers by the Chicago White Sox from the Colorado Rockies.

=== Roster ===
1996 Chicago White Sox
**Roster**
**Pitchers**: 40 Wilson Álvarez; 49 Luis Andújar; 37 James Baldwin; 46 Jason Bere; 51 Mike Bertotti; 44 Tony Castillo; 48 Jeff Darwin; 32 Alex Fernandez; 33 Marvin Freeman; 39 Roberto Hernández; 49 Stacy Jones; 47 Matt Karchner; 26 Brian Keyser; 54 Al Levine; 34 Joe Magrane; 15 Kirk McCaskill; 42 Scott Ruffcorn; 70 Rich Sauveur; 41 Bill Simas; 38 Mike Sirotka; 36 Kevin Tapani; 50 Larry Thomas	**Catchers**: 15 Pat Borders; 20 Ron Karkovice; 12 Chad Kreuter; 55 Robert Machado; 29 Don Slaught; **Infielders**: 34 Domingo Cedeño; 5 Ray Durham; 13 Ozzie Guillén; 7 Norberto Martin; 71 Jose Munoz; 31 Greg Norton; 43 Mike Robertson; 27 Chris Snopek; 35 Frank Thomas; 23 Robin Ventura	**Outfielders**: 24 Mike Cameron; 10 Darren Lewis; 14 Dave Martinez; 28 Lyle Mouton; 8 Tony Phillips; 45 Danny Tartabull; **Other batters**: 3 Harold Baines	**Manager**: 18 Terry Bevington; **Coaches**: 22 Bill Buckner; 56 Roly de Armas; 52 Ron Jackson; 17 Doug Mansolino; 21 Joe Nossek; 25 Mike Pazik; 55 Mark Salas

== Player stats ==
=== Batting ===
Note: G = Games played; AB = At bats; R = Runs scored; H = Hits; 2B = Doubles; 3B = Triples; HR = Home runs; RBI = Runs batted in; BB = Base on balls; SO = Strikeouts; AVG = Batting average; SB = Stolen bases

Player	G	AB	R	H	2B	3B	HR	RBI	BB	SO	AVG	SB
Harold Baines, DH	143	495	80	154	29	0	22	95	73	62	.311	3
Pat Borders, C	31	94	6	26	1	0	3	6	5	18	.277	0
Mike Cameron, OF	11	11	1	1	0	0	0	0	1	3	.091	0
Domingo Cedeño, SS, 2B	12	19	2	3	2	0	0	3	0	4	.158	1
Ray Durham, 2B	156	557	79	153	33	5	10	53	58	95	.275	30
Ozzie Guillén, SS	150	499	62	131	24	8	4	45	10	27	.263	6
Ron Karkovice, C	111	355	44	78	22	0	10	38	24	93	.220	0
Chad Kreuter, C	46	114	14	25	8	0	3	18	13	29	.219	0
Darren Lewis, CF	141	337	55	77	12	2	4	53	45	40	.228	21
Robert Machado, C	4	6	1	4	1	0	0	2	0	0	.667	0
Norberto Martin, SS, 2B, DH	70	140	30	49	7	0	1	14	6	17	.350	10
Dave Martinez, OF, 1B	146	440	85	140	20	8	10	53	52	52	.318	15
Lyle Mouton, OF, DH	87	214	25	63	8	1	7	39	22	50	.294	3
Jose Munoz, 2B, SS, 3B, LF	17	27	7	7	0	0	0	1	4	1	.259	0
Greg Norton, SS, 3B	11	23	4	5	0	0	2	3	4	6	.217	0
Tony Phillips, LF, 2B	153	581	119	161	29	3	12	63	125	132	.277	13
Mike Robertson, 1B	6	7	0	1	1	0	0	0	0	1	.143	0
Don Slaught, C	14	36	2	9	1	0	0	4	2	2	.250	0
Chris Snopek, 3B, SS	46	104	18	27	6	1	6	18	6	16	.260	0
Danny Tartabull, RF, DH	132	472	58	120	23	3	27	101	64	128	.254	1
Frank Thomas, 1B	141	527	110	184	26	0	40	134	109	70	.349	1
Robin Ventura, 3B, 1B	158	586	96	168	31	2	34	105	78	81	.287	1
Team totals	162	5644	898	1586	284	33	195	860	701	927	.281	105

=== Pitching ===
Note: W = Wins; L = Losses; ERA = Earned run average; G = Games pitched; GS = Games started; SV = Saves; IP = Innings pitched; H = Hits allowed; R = Runs allowed; ER = Earned runs allowed; HR = Home runs allowed; BB = Walks allowed; K = Strikeouts

Player	W	L	ERA	G	GS	SV	IP	H	R	ER	HR	BB	K
Wilson Álvarez	15	10	4.22	35	35	0	217.1	216	106	102	21	100	181
Luis Andújar	0	2	8.22	5	5	0	23.0	32	22	21	4	15	6
James Baldwin	11	6	4.42	28	28	0	169.0	168	88	83	24	60	127
Jason Bere	0	1	10.26	5	5	0	16.2	26	19	19	3	19	19
Mike Bertotti	2	0	5.14	15	2	0	28.0	28	18	16	5	23	19
Tony Castillo	3	1	1.59	15	0	1	22.2	23	7	4	1	5	9
Jeff Darwin	0	1	2.93	22	0	0	30.2	26	10	10	5	10	15
Alex Fernandez	16	10	3.45	35	35	0	258.0	248	110	99	34	76	200
Marvin Freeman	0	0	13.50	1	1	0	2.0	4	3	3	0	1	1
Roberto Hernández	6	5	1.91	72	0	38	84.0	65	21	18	2	43	85
Stacy Jones	0	0	0.00	2	0	0	2.0	0	0	0	0	1	1
Matt Karchner	7	4	5.76	50	0	1	59.1	61	42	38	10	49	46
Brian Keyser	1	2	4.98	28	0	1	59.2	78	35	33	3	36	19
Al Levine	0	1	5.40	16	0	0	18.1	22	14	11	1	8	12
Joe Magrane	1	5	6.88	19	8	0	53.2	70	45	41	10	26	21
Kirk McCaskill	5	5	6.97	29	4	0	51.2	72	41	40	6	39	28
Scott Ruffcorn	0	1	11.37	3	1	0	6.1	10	8	8	1	6	3
Rich Sauveur	0	0	15.00	3	0	0	3.0	3	5	5	1	5	1
Bill Simas	2	8	4.58	64	0	2	72.2	75	39	37	5	45	95
Mike Sirotka	1	2	7.18	15	4	0	26.1	34	27	21	3	12	11
Kevin Tapani	13	10	4.59	34	34	0	225.1	236	123	115	34	81	150
Larry Thomas	2	3	3.23	57	0	0	30.2	32	11	11	1	16	20
Team totals	85	77	4.52	162	162	43	1461.0	1529	794	733	174	676	1039

== Farm system ==
Level	Team	League	Manager
AAA	Nashville Sounds	American Association	Rick Renick
AA	Birmingham Barons	Southern League	Mike Heath
A	Prince William Cannons	Carolina League	Dave Huppert
A	South Bend Silver Hawks	Midwest League	Dave Keller
A	Hickory Crawdads	South Atlantic League	Chris Cron
Rookie	Bristol White Sox	Appalachian League	Nick Capra
Rookie	GCL White Sox	Gulf Coast League	Hector Rincones
