= 1996 Oakland Athletics season =

1996 Oakland Athletics
- League: American League
- Division: West
- Ballpark: Cashman Field (6 games, temporary); Oakland–Alameda County Coliseum
- City: Oakland, California
- Record: 78–84 (.481)
- Divisional place: 3rd
- Owners: Stephen Schott; Ken Hofmann
- General managers: Sandy Alderson
- Managers: Art Howe
- Television: KRON-TV; Sports Channel Pacific (Ray Fosse, Greg Papa)
- Radio: KFRC (Bill King, Ken Korach, Ray Fosse)

The Oakland Athletics' 1996 season was the team's 29th in Oakland, California. It was also the 96th season in franchise history. The team finished third in the American League West with a record of 78–84.

The Athletics started their season in Las Vegas, Nevada, as the renovations at the Coliseum were not finished yet. The Athletics would play their first game in Oakland on April 19th.

The 1996 season was the Athletics' first under manager Art Howe. It was also the team's fourth consecutive losing season. The reasons behind Oakland's mediocrity remained the same; a below-average offense failed to offset an awful pitching staff. The Athletics' starting rotation, once again, was in shambles; none of the Athletics' six primary starters (Don Wengert, Doug Johns, John Wasdin, Ariel Prieto, Steve Wojciechowski, and Dave Telgheder) won more than eight games. Oakland's bullpen also ranked among the league's worst. Reliever Carlos Reyes lead all pitchers in strikeouts with 78. All told, the A's boasted a team ERA of 5.20; this was the 10th best total in the 14-team American League.

The Athletics' offense was only slightly better. As had been the case in prior years, slugger Mark McGwire (his final full season as an Athletic) was the main draw; he crushed a league-high (and Oakland franchise record) 52 home runs in 1996. Designated hitter Gerónimo Berroa and catcher Terry Steinbach belted 36 and 35 home runs, respectively; secondary hitters Scott Brosius, Jason Giambi, and Ernie Young contributed 22, 20, and 19. The Athletics, as a team, hit 243 home runs (the American League's third-most); a low team batting average, however, ensured that they would finish the season with only 861 runs (the American League's 10th best total).

The Athletics hovered around the .500-mark for almost all of the season. They were not expected to contend in 1996, and indeed did not; they ultimately finished 12 games behind the first-time AL West Champion Texas Rangers.

== Offseason ==
- November 16, 1995: The Athletics hire Art Howe as manager, after Tony La Russa left to manage the St Louis Cardinals.
- November 27, 1995: Buddy Groom was signed as a free agent with the Oakland Athletics.
- December 5, 1995: Torey Lovullo was signed as a free agent with the Oakland Athletics.
- January 22, 1996: Danny Tartabull was traded by the Oakland Athletics to the Chicago White Sox for Andrew Lorraine and Charles Poe (minors).
- January 22, 1996: Rafael Bournigal was signed as a free agent with the Oakland Athletics.
- January 29, 1996: Aaron Small was selected off waivers by the Oakland Athletics from the Seattle Mariners.
- January 29, 1996: Pedro Munoz was signed as a free agent with the Oakland Athletics.
- February 13, 1996: Dennis Eckersley was traded by the Oakland Athletics to the St. Louis Cardinals for Steve Montgomery.
- March 10, 1996: Webster Garrison was signed as a free agent with the Oakland Athletics.

== Regular season ==
=== Season standings ===
AL West
Team	W	L	Pct.	GB	Home	Road
Texas Rangers	90	72	.556	—	50‍–‍31	40‍–‍41
Seattle Mariners	85	76	.528	4½	43‍–‍38	42‍–‍38
Oakland Athletics	78	84	.481	12	40‍–‍41	38‍–‍43
California Angels	70	91	.435	19½	43‍–‍38	27‍–‍53

=== Record vs. opponents ===
1996 American League record Source: MLB Standings Grid – 1996
Team	BAL	BOS	CAL	CWS	CLE	DET	KC	MIL	MIN	NYY	OAK	SEA	TEX	TOR
Baltimore	—	7–6	6–6	4–8	5–7	11–2	9–3	9–3	7–5	3–10	9–4	7–5	3–10–1	8–5
Boston	6–7	—	8–4	6–6	1–11	12–1	3–9	7–5	6–6	7–6	8–5	7–6	6–6	8–5
California	6–6	4–8	—	6–6	4–9	6–6	4–8	7–5	4–8	7–6	6–7	5–8	4–9	7–5
Chicago	8–4	6–6	6–6	—	5–8	10–3	7–6	6–7	6–7	6–7	5–7	5–7	8–4	7–5
Cleveland	7–5	11–1	9–4	8–5	—	12–0	7–6	7–6	10–3	3–9	6–6	8–4	4–8	7–5
Detroit	2–11	1–12	6–6	3–10	0–12	—	6–6	4–8	6–6	5–8	4–8	6–6	4–9	6–7
Kansas City	3–9	9–3	8–4	6–7	6–7	6–6	—	4–9	6–7	4–8	5–7	7–5	6–6	5–8
Milwaukee	3–9	5–7	5–7	7–6	6–7	8–4	9–4	—	9–4	6–6	7–5	4–9	6–7	5–7
Minnesota	5–7	6–6	8–4	7–6	3–10	6–6	7–6	4–9	—	5–7	6–7	6–6	7–5	8–5
New York	10–3	6–7	6–7	7–6	9–3	8–5	8–4	6–6	7–5	—	9–3	3–9	5–7	8–5
Oakland	4–9	5–8	7–6	7–5	6–6	8–4	7–5	5–7	7–6	3–9	—	8–5	7–6	4–8
Seattle	5–7	6–7	8–5	7–5	4–8	6–6	5–7	9–4	6–6	9–3	5–8	—	10–3	5–7
Texas	10–3–1	6–6	9–4	4–8	8–4	9–4	6–6	7–6	5–7	7–5	6–7	3–10	—	10–2
Toronto	5–8	5–8	5–7	5–7	5–7	7–6	8–5	7–5	5–8	5–8	8–4	7–5	2–10	—

=== Game log ===
1996 Game Log: 78–84 (Home: 40–41; Away: 38–43)
April: 13–12 (Home: 5–7; Away: 8–5)

#	Date	Opponent	Score	Win	Loss	Save	Attendance	Record
1	April 1	Blue Jays	6–9	Hanson	**Reyes** (0–1)	Timlin	7,294	0–1
2	April 3	Blue Jays	4–10	Hentgen	**Prieto** (0–1)	—	8,050	0–2
3	April 4	Tigers	9–10 (15)	Keagle	**Small** (0–1)	—	8,346	0–3
4	April 5	Tigers	13–2	**Johns** (1–0)	Gohr	—	11,149	1–3
5	April 6	Tigers	1–6	Lira	**Reyes** (0–2)	—	10,424	1–4
6	April 7	Tigers	7–6	**Corsi** (1–0)	Williams	—	9,723	2–4
7	April 9	@ Brewers	4–10	McDonald	**Van Poppel** (0–1)	—	42,090	2–5
8	April 11	@ Brewers	11–0	**Johns** (2–0)	Karl	—	12,236	3–5
9	April 12	@ White Sox	7–2	**Reyes** (1–2)	Fernandez	—	13,623	4–5
10	April 13	@ White Sox	5–6 (12)	Karchner	**Wengert** (0–1)	—	15,812	4–6
11	April 14	@ White Sox	10–5	**Groom** (1–0)	Simas	—	15,236	5–6
12	April 15	@ Rangers	8–3	**Mohler** (1–0)	Heredia	—	19,312	6–6
13	April 16	@ Rangers	3–5	Witt	**Johns** (2–1)	Henneman	20,948	6–7
14	April 17	@ Rangers	1–12	Hill	**Reyes** (1–3)	—	24,120	6–8
15	April 19	White Sox	3–4	Karchner	**Briscoe** (0–1)	Hernandez	31,320	6–9
16	April 20	White Sox	3–8	Tapani	**Van Poppel** (0–2)	—	16,480	6–10
17	April 21	White Sox	6–5	**Corsi** (2–0)	Simas	**Mohler** (1)	16,125	7–10
18	April 22	Brewers	6–2	**Reyes** (2–3)	Bones	**Briscoe** (1)	6,021	8–10
19	April 23	Brewers	9–6	**Wojciechowski** (1–0)	Sparks	**Mohler** (2)	7,026	9–10
20	April 24	@ Blue Jays	7–6	**Prieto** (1–1)	Hentgen	**Corsi** (1)	28,029	10–10
21	April 25	@ Blue Jays	4–3 (11)	**Mohler** (2–0)	Crabtree	—	26,163	11–10
22	April 26	@ Tigers	5–14	Christopher	**Johns** (2–2)	—	7,941	11–11
23	April 27	@ Tigers	4–1	**Reyes** (3–3)	Lira	**Taylor** (1)	13,067	12–11
24	April 28	@ Tigers	6–3	**Wojciechowski** (2–0)	Gohr	**Taylor** (2)	8,907	13–11
25	April 30	Angels	3–7	Langston	**Prieto** (1–2)	—	7,154	13–12

May: 11–16 (Home: 7–7; Away: 4–9)

#	Date	Opponent	Score	Win	Loss	Save	Attendance	Record
26	May 1	Angels	4–6	Boskie	**Van Poppel** (0–3)	Percival	6,721	13–13
27	May 2	Angels	1–3	Abbott	**Johns** (2–3)	Percival	9,102	13–14
28	May 3	@ Royals	1–3	Appier	**Reyes** (3–4)	Montgomery	14,452	13–15
29	May 4	@ Royals	5–2	**Wojciechowski** (3–0)	Gubicza	**Groom** (1)	15,987	14–15
30	May 5	@ Royals	0–2	Haney	**Prieto** (1–3)	—	16,589	14–16
31	May 6	Indians	5–3	**Taylor** (1–0)	Assenmacher	**Mohler** (3)	47,313	15–16
32	May 7	Indians	8–4	**Johns** (3–3)	Hershiser	—	10,126	16–16
33	May 8	Indians	3–7	Nagy	**Reyes** (3–5)	—	9,288	16–17
34	May 10	Twins	15–5	**Wojciechowski** (4–0)	Rodriguez	—	8,278	17–17
35	May 11	Twins	12–5	**Prieto** (2–3)	Radke	—	15,791	18–17
36	May 12	Twins	8–3	**Wengert** (1–1)	Parra	—	13,430	19–17
37	May 13	Orioles	3–4	Krivda	**Johns** (3–4)	Myers	8,204	19–18
38	May 14	Orioles	1–9	Mussina	**Reyes** (3–6)	—	8,466	19–19
39	May 17	@ Red Sox	3–5 (11)	Stanton	**Van Poppel** (0–4)	—	28,690	19–20
40	May 18	@ Red Sox	6–5 (10)	**Groom** (2–0)	Garces	**Taylor** (3)	31,663	20–20
41	May 19	@ Red Sox	2–12	Sele	**Wengert** (1–2)	—	32,601	20–21
42	May 20	@ Red Sox	4–16	Gordon	**Johns** (3–5)	—	20,890	20–22
43	May 21	@ Yankees	3–7	Gooden	**Reyes** (3–7)	—	15,614	20–23
44	May 22	@ Yankees	5–1	**Wojciechowski** (5–0)	Pettitte	**Mohler** (4)	18,544	21–23
45	May 23	@ Yankees	3–4	Rogers	**Taylor** (1–1)	Wetteland	19,315	21–24
46	May 24	@ Orioles	4–5 (10)	McDowell	**Reyes** (3–8)	—	45,024	21–25
47	May 25	@ Orioles	6–3	**Johns** (4–5)	Wells	**Groom** (2)	47,353	22–25
48	May 26	@ Orioles	1–6	Mercker	**Chouinard** (0–1)	McDowell	47,401	22–26
49	May 27	Red Sox	3–10	Wakefield	**Wojciechowski** (5–1)	—	21,688	22–27
50	May 28	Red Sox	6–2	**Wasdin** (1–0)	Clemens	—	9,338	23–27
51	May 29	Red Sox	7–6 (10)	**Mohler** (3–0)	Slocumb	—	8,282	24–27
52	May 31	Yankees	1–4	Key	**Johns** (4–6)	Wetteland	13,279	24–28

June: 14–15 (Home: 4–7; Away: 10–8)

#	Date	Opponent	Score	Win	Loss	Save	Attendance	Record
53	June 1	Yankees	3–6	Pettitte	**Chouinard** (0–2)	Wetteland	21,354	24–29
54	June 2	Yankees	4–11	Rogers	**Wojciechowski** (5–2)	Wetteland	26,331	24–30
55	June 3	Royals	2–1	**Wasdin** (2–0)	Appier	**Taylor** (4)	6,465	25–30
56	June 4	Royals	8–3	**Wengert** (2–2)	Gubicza	—	11,524	26–30
57	June 5	Royals	2–5	Haney	**Johns** (4–7)	Montgomery	8,113	26–31
58	June 7	@ Twins	6–4	**Reyes** (4–8)	Radke	**Corsi** (2)	14,999	27–31
59	June 8	@ Twins	2–4	Robertson	**Wojciechowski** (5–3)	Guardado	—	27–32
60	June 8	@ Twins	13–7	**Wasdin** (3–0)	Mahomes	—	22,164	28–32
61	June 9	@ Twins	3–5	Rodriguez	**Wengert** (2–3)	—	13,291	28–33
62	June 10	@ Indians	4–5	Nagy	**Johns** (4–8)	Mesa	42,167	28–34
63	June 11	@ Indians	5–6 (13)	Ogea	**Reyes** (4–9)	—	42,249	28–35
64	June 12	@ Indians	9–6	**Montgomery** (1–0)	McDowell	**Mohler** (5)	40,673	29–35
65	June 13	@ Brewers	3–16	Karl	**Wojciechowski** (5–4)	—	12,439	29–36
66	June 14	@ Brewers	2–6	Bones	**Wasdin** (3–1)	—	14,404	29–37
67	June 15	@ Brewers	9–12	Givens	**Wengert** (2–4)	Garcia	21,064	29–38
68	June 16	@ Brewers	10–9	**Taylor** (2–1)	Fetters	**Mohler** (6)	26,744	30–38
69	June 17	@ Tigers	8–4 (10)	**Corsi** (3–0)	Myers	—	9,231	31–38
70	June 18	@ Tigers	8–5	**Van Poppel** (1–4)	Urbani	**Taylor** (5)	8,543	32–38
71	June 19	@ Tigers	10–3	**Wasdin** (4–1)	Keagle	—	9,875	33–38
72	June 20	Blue Jays	0–1	Hentgen	**Wengert** (2–5)	Timlin	8,027	33–39
73	June 21	Blue Jays	5–7	Quantrill	**Johns** (4–9)	Timlin	10,278	33–40
74	June 22	Blue Jays	8–4	**Chouinard** (1–2)	Ware	—	20,124	34–40
75	June 23	Blue Jays	4–5	Guzman	**Wojciechowski** (5–5)	Timlin	14,407	34–41
76	June 24	Tigers	4–2	**Wasdin** (5–1)	Sodowsky	**Taylor** (6)	10,122	35–41
77	June 25	Tigers	8–10	Olivares	**Wengert** (2–6)	Olson	9,652	35–42
78	June 27	@ Angels	18–2	**Johns** (5–9)	Boskie	—	23,503	36–42
79	June 28	@ Angels	6–3	**Chouinard** (2–2)	Finley	—	32,380	37–42
80	June 29	@ Angels	11–9	**Groom** (3–0)	Monteleone	—	26,565	38–42
81	June 30	@ Angels	0–1	Hancock	**Wasdin** (5–2)	Percival	19,284	38–43

July: 17–10 (Home: 8–5; Away: 9–5)

#	Date	Opponent	Score	Win	Loss	Save	Attendance	Record
82	July 1	@ Mariners	6–4	**Wengert** (3–6)	Wagner	**Taylor** (7)	18,166	39–43
83	July 2	@ Mariners	11–6	**Mohler** (4–0)	Charlton	—	19,632	40–43
84	July 3	@ Mariners	3–4	Ayala	**Reyes** (4–10)	—	36,619	40–44
85	July 4	Angels	8–7 (11)	**Taylor** (3–1)	Monteleone	—	14,144	41–44
86	July 5	Angels	16–8	**Wasdin** (6–2)	Hancock	—	36,129	42–44
87	July 6	Angels	6–5 (10)	**Taylor** (4–1)	James	—	14,294	43–44
88	July 7	Angels	4–9	Boskie	**Johns** (5–10)	—	16,526	43–45
89	July 11	Rangers	8–3	**Chouinard** (3–2)	Oliver	—	13,437	44–45
90	July 12	Rangers	4–8 (10)	Russell	**Taylor** (4–2)	—	12,074	44–46
91	July 13	Rangers	1–8	Pavlik	**Wengert** (3–7)	—	16,792	44–47
92	July 14	Rangers	9–1	**Johns** (6–10)	Gross	—	20,704	45–47
93	July 15	Mariners	1–5	Wolcott	**Telgheder** (0–1)	—	11,183	45–48
94	July 16	Mariners	12–5	**Chouinard** (4–2)	Hitchcock	—	15,206	46–48
95	July 17	Mariners	7–6	**Corsi** (4–0)	Minor	**Taylor** (8)	14,387	47–48
96	July 18	@ Rangers	5–4 (11)	**Reyes** (5–10)	Brandenburg	**Van Poppel** (1)	28,585	48–48
97	July 19	@ Rangers	9–6	**Reyes** (6–10)	Helling	**Taylor** (9)	37,455	49–48
98	July 20	@ Rangers	4–8	Witt	**Van Poppel** (1–5)	—	46,052	49–49
99	July 21	@ Rangers	11–8	**Groom** (4–0)	Brandenburg	**Mohler** (7)	36,039	50–49
100	July 22	@ White Sox	6–5	**Taylor** (5–2)	Karchner	—	23,572	51–49
101	July 23	@ White Sox	8–4	**Wengert** (4–7)	Fernandez	**Corsi** (3)	18,527	52–49
102	July 24	@ White Sox	6–5	**Corsi** (5–0)	Simas	**Taylor** (10)	23,350	53–49
103	July 25	@ Blue Jays	3–4	Crabtree	**Witasick** (0–1)	—	30,174	53–50
104	July 26	@ Blue Jays	5–3	**Groom** (5–0)	Castillo	**Taylor** (11)	32,241	54–50
105	July 27	@ Blue Jays	4–6	Hanson	**Wasdin** (6–3)	Timlin	32,162	54–51
106	July 28	@ Blue Jays	0–1	Hentgen	**Prieto** (2–4)	—	31,150	54–52
107	July 30	White Sox	1–2	Baldwin	**Telgheder** (0–2)	Hernandez	14,210	54–53
108	July 31	White Sox	5–4	**Witasick** (1–1)	Karchner	**Taylor** (12)	13,127	55–53

August: 11–19 (Home: 8–10; Away: 3–9)

#	Date	Opponent	Score	Win	Loss	Save	Attendance	Record
109	August 1	White Sox	3–8	Tapani	**Wasdin** (6–4)	Hernandez	10,514	55–54
110	August 2	Brewers	3–4 (10)	Miranda	**Taylor** (5–3)	Fetters	10,056	55–55
111	August 3	Brewers	0–7	Bones	**Johns** (6–11)	—	15,171	55–56
112	August 4	Brewers	4–2	**Telgheder** (1–2)	Van Egmond	**Taylor** (13)	10,281	56–56
113	August 5	Brewers	3–13	Eldred	**Adams** (0–1)	—	8,616	56–57
114	August 6	@ Royals	2–9	Belcher	**Wasdin** (6–5)	—	14,028	56–58
115	August 7	@ Royals	0–7	Appier	**Prieto** (2–5)	—	15,517	56–59
116	August 8	@ Royals	2–1	**Wengert** (5–7)	Linton	**Taylor** (14)	19,197	57–59
117	August 9	Indians	4–10	McDowell	**Telgheder** (1–3)	—	20,122	57–60
118	August 10	Indians	5–1	**Adams** (1–1)	Nagy	—	30,238	58–60
119	August 11	Indians	9–3	**Wasdin** (7–5)	Lopez	—	21,914	59–60
120	August 12	Twins	11–1	**Prieto** (3–5)	Robertson	—	10,071	60–60
121	August 13	Twins	2–6	Aguilera	**Wengert** (5–8)	—	11,156	60–61
122	August 14	Twins	7–13	Rodriguez	**Telgheder** (1–4)	—	12,729	60–62
123	August 15	Orioles	5–18	Mussina	**Adams** (1–2)	—	14,026	60–63
124	August 16	Orioles	3–14	Erickson	**Wasdin** (7–6)	—	—	60–64
125	August 16	Orioles	4–5 (10)	Myers	**Mohler** (4–1)	—	15,645	60–65
126	August 17	Orioles	3–1	**Prieto** (4–5)	Coppinger	**Acre** (1)	20,231	61–65
127	August 18	Orioles	9–6	**Wengert** (6–8)	Wells	—	18,122	62–65
128	August 20	@ Red Sox	3–4	Garces	**Mohler** (4–2)	Slocumb	25,094	62–66
129	August 21	@ Red Sox	4–6	Brandenburg	**Johns** (6–12)	Slocumb	26,362	62–67
130	August 22	@ Red Sox	1–2	Clemens	**Acre** (0–1)	—	30,503	62–68
131	August 23	@ Yankees	3–5	Gooden	**Wengert** (6–9)	Rivera	34,244	62–69
132	August 24	@ Yankees	4–5	Whitehurst	**Telgheder** (1–5)	Pavlas	32,125	62–70
133	August 25	@ Yankees	6–4	**Mohler** (5–2)	Nelson	**Acre** (2)	50,808	63–70
134	August 26	@ Orioles	11–12 (10)	Myers	**Acre** (0–2)	—	43,361	63–71
135	August 27	@ Orioles	1–3	Wells	**Prieto** (4–6)	Myers	43,641	63–72
136	August 28	@ Orioles	3–0	**Wengert** (7–9)	Mussina	—	45,282	64–72
137	August 30	Red Sox	7–0	**Telgheder** (2–5)	Maddux	—	17,182	65–72
138	August 31	Red Sox	8–0	**Adams** (2–2)	Wakefield	—	32,116	66–72

September: 12–12 (Home: 8–5; Away: 4–7)

#	Date	Opponent	Score	Win	Loss	Save	Attendance	Record
139	September 1	Red Sox	3–8	Sele	**Wasdin** (7–7)	—	15,021	66–73
140	September 2	Yankees	0–5	Cone	**Prieto** (4–7)	—	20,159	66–74
141	September 3	Yankees	10–9	**Acre** (1–2)	Boehringer	**Johns** (1)	11,621	67–74
142	September 4	Yankees	3–10	Pettitte	**Telgheder** (2–6)	—	9,892	67–75
143	September 6	Royals	7–1	**Adams** (3–2)	Haney	—	14,404	68–75
144	September 7	Royals	13–6	**Prieto** (5–7)	Belcher	—	13,175	69–75
145	September 8	Royals	8–7 (10)	**Corsi** (6–0)	Pichardo	—	17,208	70–75
146	September 10	@ Twins	7–0	**Telgheder** (3–6)	Robertson	—	9,676	71–75
147	September 11	@ Twins	2–7	Radke	**Adams** (3–3)	—	9,493	71–76
148	September 12	@ Twins	3–4 (12)	Stevens	**Mohler** (5–3)	—	9,712	71–77
149	September 14	@ Indians	2–9	Nagy	**Wengert** (7–10)	—	—	71–78
150	September 14	@ Indians	8–9	Plunk	**Small** (0–2)	Mesa	42,233	71–79
151	September 15	@ Indians	10–9 (10)	**Reyes** (7–10)	Mesa	—	42,226	72–79
152	September 17	@ Angels	5–1	**Prieto** (6–7)	Springer	—	17,827	73–79
153	September 18	@ Angels	1–3	Finley	**Adams** (3–4)	Percival	18,213	73–80
154	September 20	@ Mariners	2–12	Carmona	**Wengert** (7–11)	Meacham	56,535	73–81
155	September 21	@ Mariners	2–9	Moyer	**Telgheder** (3–7)	—	56,103	73–82
156	September 22	@ Mariners	13–11	**Mohler** (6–3)	Mulholland	**Taylor** (15)	54,194	74–82
157	September 23	Rangers	5–3	**Wasdin** (8–7)	Witt	**Taylor** (16)	10,164	75–82
158	September 24	Rangers	3–7	Cook	**Small** (0–3)	—	9,694	75–83
159	September 26	Mariners	7–5	**Taylor** (6–3)	Charlton	—	11,141	76–83
160	September 27	Mariners	8–1	**Telgheder** (4–7)	Mulholland	—	25,132	77–83
161	September 28	Mariners	3–5 (10)	Carmona	**Acre** (1–3)	Charlton	30,057	77–84
162	September 29	Mariners	3–1	**Small** (1–3)	Torres	**Taylor** (17)	34,462	78–84

Legend: = Win = Loss
Bold = Athletics team member

=== Detailed records ===
American League
Opponent	W	L	WP	RS	RA
AL East
Baltimore Orioles	4	9	0.308	54	86
Boston Red Sox	5	8	0.385	57	76
Detroit Tigers	8	4	0.667	83	66
New York Yankees	3	9	0.250	45	71
Toronto Blue Jays	4	8	0.333	50	59
Total	24	38	0.387	289	358
AL Central
Chicago White Sox	7	5	0.583	63	58
Cleveland Indians	6	6	0.500	72	72
Kansas City Royals	7	5	0.583	50	47
Milwaukee Brewers	5	7	0.417	64	87
Minnesota Twins	7	6	0.538	91	64
Total	32	29	0.525	340	328
AL West
California Angels	7	6	0.538	83	64
**Oakland Athletics**					
Seattle Mariners	8	5	0.615	78	74
Texas Rangers	7	6	0.538	71	76
Total	22	17	0.564	232	214
Season Total	78	84	0.481	861	900

Month	Games	Won	Lost	Win %	RS	RA
April	25	13	12	0.520	145	145
May	27	11	16	0.407	120	142
June	29	14	15	0.483	175	162
July	27	17	10	0.630	163	139
August	30	11	19	0.367	130	170
September	24	12	12	0.500	128	142
Total	162	78	84	0.481	861	900

	Games	Won	Lost	Win %	RS	RA
Home	81	40	41	0.494	440	452
Away	81	38	43	0.469	421	448
Total	162	78	84	0.481	861	900

=== Transactions ===
- June 4, 1996: Eric Chavez was drafted by the Oakland Athletics in the 1st round (10th overall) of the 1996 amateur draft. Signed August 27, 1996.
- June 4, 1996: A. J. Hinch was drafted by the Oakland Athletics in the 3rd round of the 1996 amateur draft. Signed June 22, 1996.

=== Roster ===
1996 Oakland Athletics
**Roster**
**Pitchers**: 55 Mark Acre; 40 Willie Adams; 53 John Briscoe; 54 Bobby Chouinard; 41 Jim Corsi; 58 Paul Fletcher; 42 Buddy Groom; 51 Doug Johns; 32 Mike Mohler; 37 Steve Montgomery; 48 Ariel Prieto; 17 Carlos Reyes; 30 Aaron Small; 22 Billy Taylor; 50 Dave Telgheder; 59 Todd Van Poppel; 31 John Wasdin; 56 Don Wengert; 52 Jay Witasick; 39 Steve Wojciechowski	**Catchers**: 21 Izzy Molina; 36 Terry Steinbach; 19 George Williams; **Infielders**: 28 Tony Batista; 14 Mike Bordick; 26,40 Rafael Bournigal; 7 Scott Brosius; 49 Webster Garrison; 8 Brent Gates; 6 Torey Lovullo; 25 Mark McGwire	**Outfielders**: 2 Allen Battle; 29 Gerónimo Berroa; 16 Jason Giambi; 44 José Herrera; 24 Brian Lesher; 33 Damon Mashore; 45 Kerwin Moore; 5 Pedro Muñoz; 23 Phil Plantier; 13 Scott Spiezio; 12 Matt Stairs; 11 Ernie Young	**Manager**: 18 Art Howe; **Coaches**: 3 Bob Cluck; 11 Duffy Dyer; 35 Brad Fischer; 15 Denny Walling; 38 Ron Washington

== Player stats ==
= Indicates team leader

= Indicates league leader

=== Batting ===
==== Starters by position ====
Note: Pos = Position; G = Games played; AB = At bats; H = Hits; Avg. = Batting average; HR = Home runs; RBI = Runs batted in

Pos	Player	G	AB	H	Avg.	HR	RBI
C	Terry Steinbach	145	514	140	.272	35	100
1B	Mark McGwire	130	423	132	.312	52	113
2B	Brent Gates	64	247	65	.263	2	30
3B	Scott Brosius	114	428	130	.304	22	71
SS	Mike Bordick	155	525	126	.240	5	54
LF	Phil Plantier	73	231	49	.212	7	31
CF	Ernie Young	141	462	112	.242	19	64
RF	José Herrera	108	320	86	.269	6	30
DH	Gerónimo Berroa	153	586	170	.290	36	106

==== Other batters ====
Note: G = Games played; AB = At bats; H = Hits; Avg. = Batting average; HR = Home runs; RBI = Runs batted in

Player	G	AB	H	Avg.	HR	RBI
Jason Giambi	140	536	156	.291	20	79
Rafael Bournigal	88	252	61	.242	0	18
Tony Batista	74	238	71	.298	6	25
Matt Stairs	61	137	38	.277	10	23
George Williams	56	132	20	.152	3	10
Allen Battle	47	130	25	.192	1	5
Pedro Muñoz	34	121	31	.256	6	18
Damon Mashore	50	105	28	.267	3	12
Brian Lesher	26	82	19	.232	5	16
Torey Lovullo	65	82	18	.220	3	9
Scott Spiezio	9	29	9	.310	2	8
Izzy Molina	14	25	5	.200	0	1
Kerwin Moore	22	16	1	.063	0	0
Webster Garrison	5	9	0	.000	0	0

=== Pitching ===
==== Starting pitchers ====
Note: G = Games pitched; IP = Innings pitched; W = Wins; L = Losses; ERA = Earned run average; SO = Strikeouts

Player	G	IP	W	L	ERA	SO
John Wasdin	25	131.1	8	7	5.96	75
Ariel Prieto	21	125.2	6	7	4.15	75
Steve Wojciechowski	16	79.2	5	5	5.65	30
Dave Telgheder	16	79.1	4	7	4.65	43
Willie Adams	12	76.1	3	4	4.01	68
Bobby Chouinard	13	59.0	4	2	6.10	32

==== Other pitchers ====
Note: G = Games pitched; IP = Innings pitched; W = Wins; L = Losses; ERA = Earned run average; SO = Strikeouts

Player	G	IP	W	L	ERA	SO
Don Wengert	36	161.1	7	11	5.58	75
Doug Johns	40	158.0	6	12	5.98	71
Carlos Reyes	46	122.1	7	10	4.78	78
Todd Van Poppel	28	63.0	1	5	7.71	37
Aaron Small	12	28.2	1	3	8.16	17

==== Relief pitchers ====
Note: G = Games pitched; W = Wins; L = Losses; SV = Saves; ERA = Earned run average; SO = Strikeouts

Player	G	W	L	SV	ERA	SO
Billy Taylor	55	6	3	17	4.33	67
Mike Mohler	72	6	3	7	3.67	64
Buddy Groom	72	5	0	2	3.84	57
Jim Corsi	56	6	0	3	4.03	43
Mark Acre	22	1	3	2	6.12	18
John Briscoe	17	0	1	1	3.76	14
Jay Witasick	12	1	1	0	6.23	12
Steve Montgomery	8	1	0	0	9.22	8
Paul Fletcher	1	0	0	0	20.25	0

== Awards and records ==
- Mark McGwire, Silver Slugger Award
- Mark McGwire, Major League record, 1st player to reach 50 Home Runs in one season before reaching 400 at-bats in a season

All-Star Game

- Mark McGwire, First Base, Reserve

== Farm system ==
Level	Team	League	Manager
AAA	Edmonton Trappers	Pacific Coast League	Gary Jones
AA	Huntsville Stars	Southern League	Dick Scott
A	Modesto A's	California League	Jim Colborn
A	West Michigan Whitecaps	Midwest League	Mike Quade
A-Short Season	Southern Oregon Timberjacks	Northwest League	Tony DeFrancesco
Rookie	AZL Athletics	Arizona League	Juan Navarrette

LEAGUE CHAMPIONS: Edmonton, West Michigan
