= Steve Wojciechowski (disambiguation) =

Steve Wojciechowski (born 1976) is an American college basketball coach and former player.

Steve Wojciechowski is also the name of:

- Steve Wojciechowski (baseball) (born 1970), American former professional baseball player
- Steve Wojciechowski (ice hockey) (born 1922), Canadian former professional ice hockey player
