= Marty Janzen =

American baseball player (born 1973)

- Pitcher
- Born: May 31, 1973 (age 53); Homestead, Florida, U.S.
- Batted: Right Threw: Right

MLB debut
- May 12, 1996, for the Toronto Blue Jays

Last MLB appearance
- September 27, 1997, for the Toronto Blue Jays

MLB statistics
- Win–loss record: 6–7
- Earned run average: 6.39
- Strikeouts: 64

KBO statistics
- Win–loss record: 0–1
- Earned run average: 8.53
- Strikeouts: 10

CPBL statistics
- Win–loss record: 0–0
- Earned run average: 18.00
- Strikeouts: 1
- Stats at Baseball Reference

Teams
- Toronto Blue Jays (1996–1997); Kia Tigers (2001); Macoto Cobras (2004)

Martin Thomas Janzen (born May 31, 1973) is an American former professional baseball pitcher. Janzen played in Major League Baseball for the Toronto Blue Jays, in the KBO League for the Kia Tigers, and in the Chinese Professional Baseball League for the Macoto Cobras.

== Playing career ==
Janzen played baseball at Gainesville High School in Gainesville, Florida but did not plan to play baseball after high school and was considering, instead, pursuing a career as a professional bowler. However, after graduating, Janzen spent a summer playing American Legion Baseball with coach Kevin Maris, the son of Roger Maris, and added 10 mph (16 km/h) to his fastball. He signed with the New York Yankees as an amateur free agent on August 8, 1991.

Janzen was assigned to the Gulf Coast League to start his professional career. By 1994, he had reached the South Atlantic League with the Greensboro Bats and was described in the Greensboro News & Record as one of the "Yankees' prized pitching prospects."

During the 1995 season, Janzen was considered one of the best prospects in the Yankees' system and was the centerpiece of a trade deadline deal to the Toronto Blue Jays for reigning American League Cy Young Award winner David Cone. The trade has been retrospectively regarded one of the most lopsided trade deadline swaps in league history.

Janzen made his Major League debut with the Blue Jays on May 12 of the following season, pitching three scoreless innings in relief of Tony Castillo and picking up the win at the SkyDome against the Boston Red Sox. Janzen made the first start of his Major League career on May 27 against the Chicago White Sox. He allowed three runs over seven innings pitched. Janzen pitched 98.2 innings over 27 games in parts of the 1996 and 1997 seasons with the Blue Jays. He did not appear in the Major Leagues again after the 1997 season.

After the 1997 season, Janzen was selected by the Arizona Diamondbacks from the Blue Jays in the 1997 MLB expansion draft. Before the start of the 1998 season, he was traded by the Diamondbacks with Todd Erdos to the Yankees for Andy Fox. Between 1998 and 2004, Janzen played in five different countries for 18 different teams in the Korea Baseball Organization, Chinese Professional Baseball League, Mexican League, various independent leagues and in affiliated Minor League Baseball.

== Coaching career ==
In 2008, Janzen coached a travel baseball team in Gainesville. In 2010, he was a pitching coach for the Southern Maryland Blue Crabs. From 2011 to 2013, Janzen coached with the Lancaster Barnstormers. In 2015, he was hired as a pitching coach with the Long Island Ducks.
