= Huck Flener =

American baseball player (born 1969)

- Pitcher
- Born: February 25, 1969 (age 57); Austin, Texas, U.S.
- Batted: Switch Threw: Left

MLB debut
- September 14, 1993, for the Toronto Blue Jays

Last MLB appearance
- July 28, 1997, for the Toronto Blue Jays

MLB statistics
- Win–loss record: 3–3
- Earned run average: 5.51
- Strikeouts: 55
- Stats at Baseball Reference

Teams
- Toronto Blue Jays (1993, 1996–1997)

Gregory Alan Flener (born February 25, 1969) is an American former professional baseball pitcher. He played parts of three seasons with the Toronto Blue Jays of Major League Baseball (MLB).

== Career ==
Flener attended Armijo High School (Fairfield, California), then spent three years at California State University, Fullerton pursuing a business major. During those three seasons, Flener had a record of 21-3 as a starting pitcher. After the 1989 season, he played collegiate summer baseball with the Chatham A's of the Cape Cod Baseball League and was named a league all-star. He left school before completing his degree when the Toronto Blue Jays selected him in the ninth round of the 1990 MLB draft.

Flener played for the Blue Jays in 1993, 1996, and 1997. Though the Blue Jays won the World Series in 1993 and Flener was awarded a World Series ring, he did not play in any post-season games and was not on the playoff roster. Flener continued playing minor league baseball until January 2001, when he lost his right eye after being struck by a batted ball while pitching in the Venezuelan Professional Baseball League.
