= Jeff Ware (baseball) =

American baseball player (born 1970)

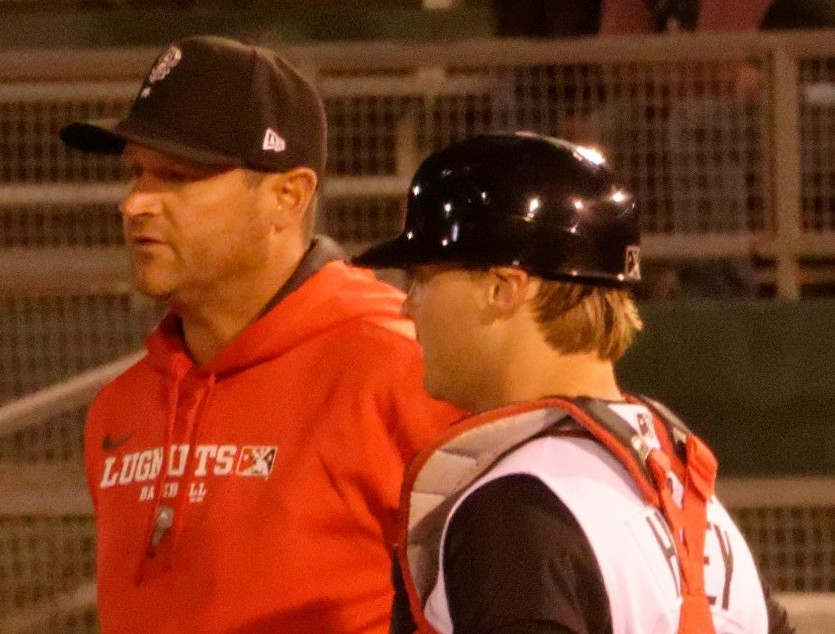
- Ware (left) with the Lansing Lugnuts in 2016
- Pitcher/bullpen coach
- Born: November 11, 1970 (age 55); Norfolk, Virginia, U.S.
- Batted: Right Threw: Right

MLB debut
- September 2, 1995, for the Toronto Blue Jays

Last MLB appearance
- July 7, 1996, for the Toronto Blue Jays

MLB statistics
- Win–loss record: 3–6
- Earned run average: 7.47
- Strikeouts: 29
- Stats at Baseball Reference

Teams
- As player: Toronto Blue Jays (1995–1996); As Coach: Toronto Blue Jays (2023–2024)
Medals
Men's baseball
Representing United States
Pan American Games
Bronze medal – third place	1991 Havana	Team

Jeffrey Allan Ware (born November 11, 1970) is an American former professional baseball pitcher. He also played in parts of two seasons with the Blue Jays in 1995 and 1996.

Ware attended First Colonial High School in Virginia Beach, Virginia, and Old Dominion University, where he played college baseball for the Old Dominion Monarchs.

During his time in the minor leagues with the Knoxville Smokies, Michael Jordan hit one of his three career home runs off him.

In early 2015, he was named as the pitching coach for the Class-A Lansing Lugnuts. In 2021, Ware was appointed to serve as the Triple-A Buffalo Bisons pitching coach. On July 13, 2022, Ware was promoted by the Blue Jays to interim manager of the Bisons, after Casey Candaele was promoted to interim bench coach of the Blue Jays following the firing of Charlie Montoyo. On July 29, Ware was appointed interim manager of the Bisons for the rest of the season.

On January 31, 2023, Ware was named as the new bullpen coach for the Toronto Blue Jays. He was dismissed following the 2024 season.

In 2026, Ware was named as the pitching coach of the Norfolk Tides the Triple-A affiliate of the Baltimore Orioles.
