= Dane Johnson =

American baseball player (born 1963)

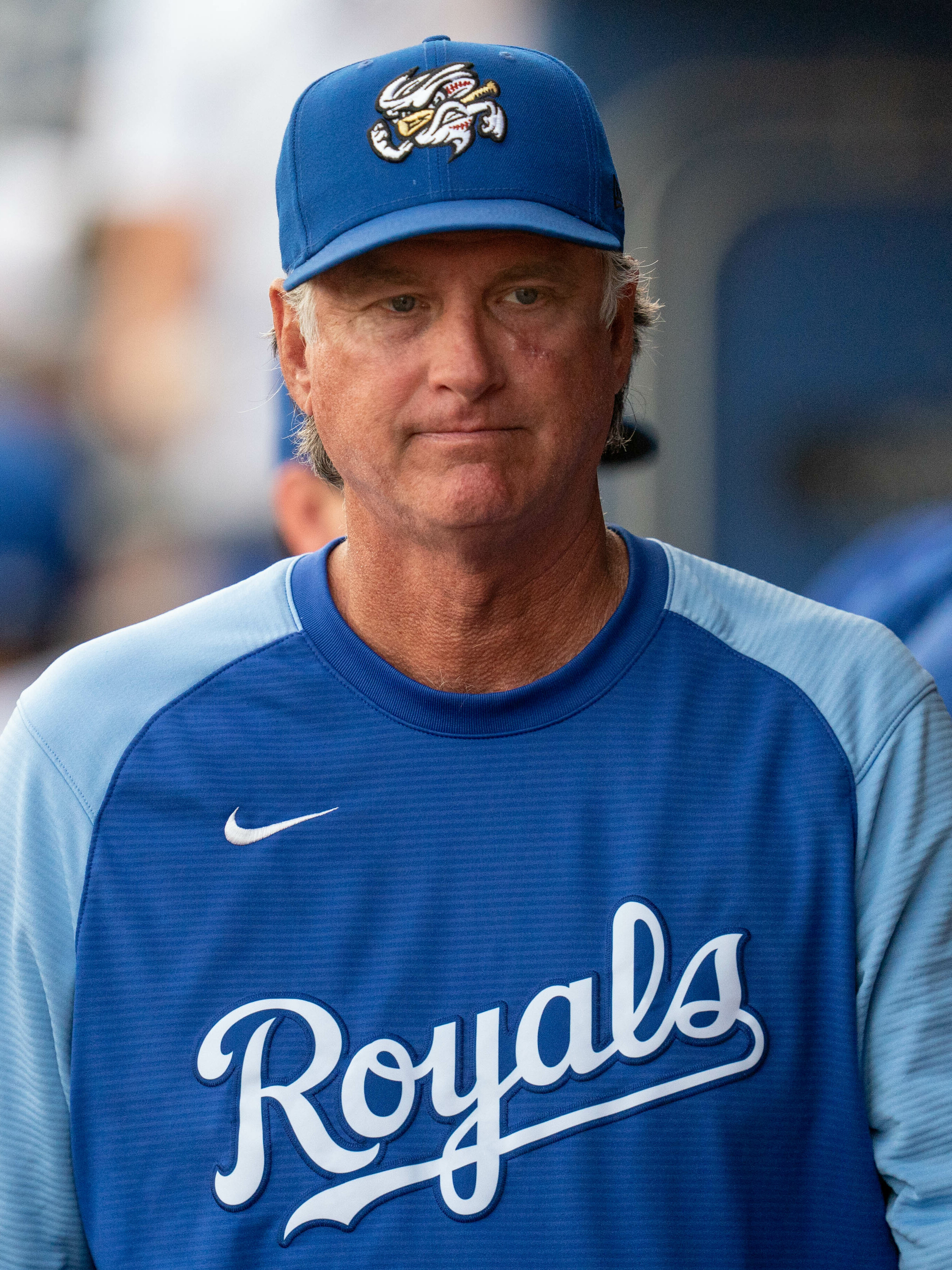
- Johnson with the Omaha Storm Chasers in May 2023
- Pitcher/Bullpen coach
- Born: February 10, 1963 (age 62); Coral Gables, Florida, U.S.
- Batted: Right Threw: Right

Professional debut
- CPBL: March 18, 1990, for the Brother Elephants
- MLB: May 30, 1994, for the Chicago White Sox

Last appearance
- CPBL: 1991, for the Brother Elephants
- MLB: August 31, 1997, for the Oakland Athletics

CPBL statistics
- Win–loss record: 7–20
- Earned run average: 4.59
- Strikeouts: 77

MLB statistics
- Win–loss record: 6–2
- Earned run average: 4.70
- Strikeouts: 57
- Stats at Baseball Reference

Teams
- Brother Elephants (1990); Mercuries Tigers (1991); Brother Elephants (1991); Chicago White Sox (1994); Toronto Blue Jays (1996); Oakland Athletics (1997); As coach: Toronto Blue Jays (2015–2018)

Dane Edward Johnson (born February 10, 1963) is an American former professional baseball coach and former pitcher. He played parts of three seasons in Major League Baseball (MLB) for the Chicago White Sox, Toronto Blue Jays, and Oakland Athletics.

== Career ==
Johnson attended St. Thomas University in Miami Gardens, Florida and was drafted by the Blue Jays in the 2nd round of the 1984 amateur draft. He played at various levels of the minor league organization from 1984 to 1989. In 1990 he played for the Brother Elephants of the Chinese Professional Baseball League, and in 1991 he played for the Mercuries Tigers. He returned to minor league baseball in 1993, playing in the Milwaukee Brewers organization, starting with the Double-A El Paso Diablos and later with the Triple-A New Orleans Zephyrs.

He made his major league debut in 1994 with the White Sox, and was with their Triple-A affiliate, the Nashville Sounds for the entire 1995 season. In 1996 Johnson returned to the Toronto organization, making a brief appearance with the Blue Jays and spending the rest of the season with the Triple-A Syracuse Chiefs.

In 1997, Johnson made 38 relief appearances for the Oakland Athletics posting a 4–1 record. He split the 1998 season playing with the Blue Jays and Florida Marlins minor league organizations, and in 1999 he briefly pitched for the Albany-Colonie Diamond Dogs of the independent Northern League. Johnson was the Blue Jays' bullpen coach for the 2015 season, after serving as a roving minor league pitching instructor with the organization since 2004. The Blue Jays fired Johnson after the 2018 season.

He was named the pitching coach of the Omaha Storm Chasers prior to the 2020 season which eventually was canceled due to the COVID-19 pandemic. He remained in the role when play resumed in 2021.
