= Mike Huff =

American baseball player (born 1963)

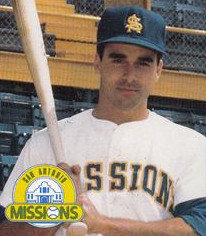
- Huff in 1988
- Outfielder
- Born: August 11, 1963 (age 62); Honolulu, Hawaii, U.S.
- Batted: Right Threw: Right

MLB debut
- August 7, 1989, for the Los Angeles Dodgers

Last MLB appearance
- July 4, 1996, for the Toronto Blue Jays

MLB statistics
- Batting average: .247
- Home runs: 9
- Runs batted in: 75
- Stats at Baseball Reference

Teams
- Los Angeles Dodgers (1989); Cleveland Indians (1991); Chicago White Sox (1991–1993); Toronto Blue Jays (1994–1996)

Michael Kale Huff (born August 11, 1963) is an American former professional Major League Baseball (MLB) outfielder who played for several teams between 1989 and 1996.

== Amateur career ==
A native of Honolulu, Hawaii, Huff played college baseball at Northwestern University. In 1984, he played collegiate summer baseball with the Falmouth Commodores of the Cape Cod Baseball League.

== Professional career ==
He was drafted in the sixteenth round (402nd overall) in the 1985 Major League Baseball draft. Over his career in the majors, Huff played outfield with the Dodgers, Indians, White Sox, and Blue Jays from 1989 to 1996. Huff was a member of the 1993 Western Division Champion White Sox.

== Broadcasting career ==
He occasionally served as a television broadcast announcer for the Chicago White Sox, filling in for regular announcers Ken Harrelson and Steve Stone. Huff also has been known to make appearances at Coal City High School, at the request of Dean Vigna. He speaks to the Varsity Club about his experiences and life in the MLB.
