= Tim Crabtree =

American baseball player

- Pitcher
- Born: October 13, 1969 (age 56); Jackson, Michigan, U.S.
- Batted: Right Threw: Right

MLB debut
- June 23, 1995, for the Toronto Blue Jays

Last MLB appearance
- June 25, 2001, for the Texas Rangers

MLB statistics
- Win–loss record: 21–22
- Earned run average: 4.20
- Strikeouts: 288
- Stats at Baseball Reference

Teams
- Toronto Blue Jays (1995–1997); Texas Rangers (1998–2001)

Timothy Lyle Crabtree (born October 13, 1969) is an American former Major League Baseball pitcher for the Toronto Blue Jays and Texas Rangers from 1995 to 2001.

Crabtree, a relief pitcher, was an important part of the Rangers' division winning teams in 1998 and 1999.

He was later signed by four teams as a free agent from 2002 to 2005, although never appeared in the major leagues again.
