= Stacy Jones (baseball) =

American baseball player (born 1967)

- Pitcher
- Born: May 26, 1967 (age 59); Gadsden, Alabama, U.S.
- Batted: Right Threw: Right

MLB debut
- July 30, 1991, for the Baltimore Orioles

Last MLB appearance
- September 29, 1996, for the Chicago White Sox

MLB statistics
- Win–loss record: 0–0
- Earned run average: 3.46
- Strikeouts: 11
- Stats at Baseball Reference

Teams
- Baltimore Orioles (1991); Chicago White Sox (1996)

Joseph Stacy Jones (born May 26, 1967) is an American former professional pitcher who played during two seasons in Major League Baseball for the Baltimore Orioles and Chicago White Sox.

Jones played baseball at Etowah High School in Alabama and was a starting pitcher for the Auburn Tigers for three years. He was a roommate at Auburn with Gregg Olson. He was selected in the third round of the 1988 Major League Baseball draft. He began his professional baseball career in the New York–Penn League with the Erie Orioles.

Jones was called up to the majors for the first time on July 30, 1991 along with Mike Mussina and Jim Poole. He made his Major League debut on July 31 against the Seattle Mariners at the Kingdome in relief of Poole and pitched two scoreless innings. He returned to the minors two weeks later with a shoulder injury and did not pitch again in the majors that season. Jones pitched in Minor League Baseball until 1997 with the exception of two games at the Major League level with the White Sox in 1996. He suffered an arm injury in 1997 and never returned to professional baseball.
