= Domingo Cedeño =

Dominican baseball player (born 1968)

- Infielder
- Born: November 4, 1968 (age 57); La Romana, Dominican Republic
- Batted: Switch Threw: Right

MLB debut
- May 19, 1993, for the Toronto Blue Jays

Last MLB appearance
- September 10, 1999, for the Philadelphia Phillies

MLB statistics
- Batting average: .251
- Home runs: 15
- Runs batted in: 121
- Stats at Baseball Reference

Teams
- Toronto Blue Jays (1993–1996); Chicago White Sox (1996); Texas Rangers (1997–1998); Seattle Mariners (1999); Philadelphia Phillies (1999)

Domingo Antonio Cedeño Donastorg (born November 4, 1968) is a Dominican former professional baseball infielder, who played in Major League Baseball (MLB) in parts of seven seasons from 1993 to 1999 for the Toronto Blue Jays, Chicago White Sox, Texas Rangers, Seattle Mariners, and Philadelphia Phillies.

== Playing career ==
Cedeño signed with Toronto as an international free agent in August 1987. He set a Dunedin Blue Jays record with 10 triples in 1990. He tied for the International League lead with 10 triples in 1993. He made his MLB debut with Toronto that May, batting .174 in 15 games. He also split 1994 between the majors and Triple-A before playing solely in the majors in his final two years with the Blue Jays. Toronto traded him with Tony Castillo to the White Sox for Luis Andújar and Allen Halley in August 1996. He played in 12 games for Chicago before reaching free agency.

Cedeño signed with the Rangers in 1997, playing in a career-high 113 games despite missing more than a month on the disabled list with a rib cage injury. He ranked 10th in the American League with six triples. He led Texas with six pinch hits in 1998 then was released after the season.

Cedeño signed with the Oakland Athletics in December 1998. He was released in April 1999 and quickly signed with the Mariners. He hit .214 in 21 games. Seattle traded him to the Phillies for shortstop Jose Flores on July 7. In his final stint in the majors, Cedeño hit .152 in 32 games. Cedeño signed with the New York Mets in 2000, playing in three games in Triple-A. He then played two seasons for the Cafeteros de Córdoba in the Mexican Baseball League.

== Personal life ==
Cedeño is the older brother of the late shortstop Andújar Cedeño, who played in MLB from 1990 to 1996. Cedeño has two children.

Cedeño attended La Romana High School in La Romana, Dominican Republic.
