= Tony Castillo (pitcher) =

Venezuelan baseball player (born 1963)

- Pitcher
- Born: March 1, 1963 (age 63); Quíbor, Lara, Venezuela
- Batted: Left Threw: Left

MLB debut
- August 14, 1988, for the Toronto Blue Jays

Last MLB appearance
- June 19, 1998, for the Chicago White Sox

MLB statistics
- Win–loss record: 28–23
- Earned run average: 3.93
- Strikeouts: 333
- Stats at Baseball Reference

Teams
- Toronto Blue Jays (1988–1989); Atlanta Braves (1989–1991); New York Mets (1991); Toronto Blue Jays (1993–1996); Chicago White Sox (1996–1998)

Career highlights and awards
- World Series champion (1993)

Antonio José Castillo Jiménez (born March 1, 1963) is a Venezuelan former relief pitcher in Major League Baseball (MLB), who played for the Toronto Blue Jays, Atlanta Braves, New York Mets and Chicago White Sox. Listed at 5' 10" [1.78 m.], 177 lb. [80 k.], he batted and threw left-handed.

Castillo played in ten MLB seasons spanning 1988–1998, pitching in 403 games, 218 of them with the Blue Jays. Castillo posted an overall record of 28–23 with a 3.93 ERA and 22 saves, striking out 333 batters while walking 179 in 526 2/3 innings of work. Castillo played in four career playoff games, all with Toronto in 1993, posting a 1–0 record with a 5.06 ERA, and helping the Jays win the 1993 World Series.

== Toronto Blue Jays (1988–1989) ==
Castillo signed with the Toronto Blue Jays as an amateur free agent on February 16, 1983, and worked his way through the Blue Jays farm system before making his Major League Baseball debut with the club on August 14, 1988, where he pitched a scoreless inning out of the bullpen in a 6–0 loss to the Kansas City Royals. He earned his first career strikeout against Royals shortstop Kurt Stillwell. On September 3, Castillo earned his first career victory, pitching 2 1/3 innings, allowing no hits and walking two batters, while striking out one in a 7–4 win over the Texas Rangers. Castillo played in 14 games with Toronto, going 1–0 with a 3.00 ERA in 15 innings pitched.

Castillo began the 1989 season with the Blue Jays, however, he struggled with the team, going 1–1 with a 6.11 ERA in 17 games. He did earn his first career save on April 16 against the Kansas City Royals, pitching 4 2/3 innings of scoreless baseball out of the bullpen in a 15–8 win. On August 24, the Blue Jays traded Castillo and Francisco Cabrera to the Atlanta Braves for Jim Acker.

== Atlanta Braves (1989–1991) ==
Castillo finished the 1989 season with the Atlanta Braves, getting into getting into 12 games with the club, going 0–1 with a 4.82 ERA in 9 2/3 innings pitched.

In 1990, Castillo made his first career start on July 24 in the second game of a doubleheader against the Houston Astros, and allowed two runs in 4 1/3 innings pitched, as he had a no-decision in a 9–8 victory. He played in 52 games with Atlanta, starting three of them, as Castillo had a 5–1 record with a 4.23 ERA in 76 2/3 innings pitched.

Castillo began the 1991 season in the Braves bullpen, where he went 1–1 with a 7.27 ERA in seven games before being traded with Joe Roa to the New York Mets for Alejandro Peña on August 28.

== New York Mets (1991) ==
Castillo finished the 1991 season strong with the New York Mets, playing in 10 games, starting three of them, as he went 1–0 with a 1.90 ERA in 23 2/3 innings pitched. On January 22, 1992, the Mets traded Castillo and Mark Carreon to the Detroit Tigers in exchange for Paul Gibson and minor leaguer Randy Marshall.

== Detroit Tigers (1992) ==
Castillo ran into injury problems in the 1992 season, and did not play in any games with the Tigers. He then spent some time with their Triple-A affiliate, the Toledo Mud Hens of the International League, where he was primarily used as a starting pitcher. On October 15, Castillo was granted free agency.

== Toronto Blue Jays (1993–1996) ==
On January 11, 1993, Castillo rejoined his original team, the Blue Jays. Castillo made 51 appearances as part of the bullpen, going 3–2 record with a 3.38 ERA in 50 2/3 innings pitched en route to the 1993 American League East title. In the championship series, he pitched two scoreless innings in two games, as the Blue Jays defeated the Chicago White Sox and advanced to the 1993 World Series to face the Philadelphia Phillies. Castillo earned the victory in the fourth game of the series, as Toronto won the game 15–14. Overall, Castillo was 1–0 with an ERA of 8.10, allowing three runs in 3 1/3 innings, while Toronto won the World Series championship in six games.

Castillo had a very strong 1994 season, going 5–2 with a 2.51 ERA in 68 innings pitched, before the season ended early due to the 1994 strike.

Castillo had another solid season in 1995, despite posting a 1–5 record in 55 games, collecting an ERA of 3.22 in 72 2/3 innings and leading the Blue Jays with 13 saves.

In 1996, Castillo had a record 2–3 with a 4.23 ERA in 40 games out of the bullpen. In August, he was traded by Toronto along Domingo Cedeño to the Chicago White Sox for Luis Andújar and minor leaguer Allen Halley.

== Chicago White Sox (1996–1998) ==
Castillo finished the 1996 season with the White Sox strong, going 3–1 with a 1.50 ERA in 15 games pitched.

In 1997, Castillo pitched in a career-high 64 games, going 4–4 with a 4.91 ERA and four saves. But he struggled in 1998, as he was 1–1 with an 8.10 ERA in 25 appearances. He was released in June of that year.

== See also ==
- List of Major League Baseball players from Venezuela
