= Doug Johns =

American baseball player (born 1967)

- Pitcher
- Born: December 19, 1967 (age 57); South Bend, Indiana, U.S.
- Batted: Right Threw: Left

MLB debut
- July 8, 1995, for the Oakland Athletics

Last appearance
- October 2, 1999, for the Baltimore Orioles

MLB statistics
- Win–loss record: 20–22
- Earned run average: 5.13
- Strikeouts: 180
- Stats at Baseball Reference

Teams
- Oakland Athletics (1995–1996); Baltimore Orioles (1998–1999)

Douglas Alan Johns (born December 19, 1967), is an American former professional baseball player who was a pitcher from 1995-1999. He played for the Oakland Athletics and Baltimore Orioles of Major League Baseball (MLB). His mother is Jewish, and his father is Roman Catholic, and he considers himself Catholic.

Johns attended Nova High School and played college baseball for the Virginia Cavaliers before being selected in the 1990 Major League Baseball draft by the Athletics. In the Midwest League in 1991, he threw a no-hitter. He led the Pacific Coast League with a 2.89 earned run average in 1994. He made his Major League debut in 1995 and was elected from the game after nearly hitting John Olerud with a pitch. Johns spent part of the 1997 season in Italy pitching for the Parma Angels but, upon returning to the United States to renew his visa, he was offered a job playing in the Orioles farm system.
