= Steve Wojciechowski (baseball) =

American baseball player

- Pitcher
- Born: July 29, 1970 (age 54); Blue Island, Illinois, U.S.
- Batted: Left Threw: Left

MLB debut
- July 18, 1995, for the Oakland Athletics

Last MLB appearance
- July 18, 1997, for the Oakland Athletics

MLB statistics
- Win–loss record: 7–10
- Earned run average: 5.65
- Strikeouts: 48
- Stats at Baseball Reference

Teams
- Oakland Athletics (1995–1997)

Steven Joseph Wojciechowski (born July 29, 1970) is an American former professional baseball player. A left-handed pitcher, he played parts of three seasons in Major League Baseball (MLB) for the Oakland Athletics in 1995–1997. Wojciechowski grew up in Calumet City, IL with three sisters and a brother. He attended TF North High School there. Steve attended Saint Xavier University and was drafted by the Oakland Athletics in the 4th round of the 1991 MLB draft.

He now resides in East Grand Rapids, Michigan with his wife, Stacey Elmquist-Wojciechowski.

He teaches Geography and World History at East Grand Rapids Middle School. He also, is the pitching coach for the Aquinas Saints a NAIA baseball team in the WHAC conference.
