= Luis Andújar =

Dominican baseball player (born 1972)

- Pitcher
- Born: November 22, 1972 (age 53); Baní, Dominican Republic
- Batted: Right Threw: Right

MLB debut
- September 8, 1995, for the Chicago White Sox

Last MLB appearance
- June 28, 1998, for the Toronto Blue Jays

MLB statistics
- Win–loss record: 3–10
- Earned run average: 5.98
- Strikeouts: 49
- Stats at Baseball Reference

Teams
- Chicago White Sox (1995–1996); Toronto Blue Jays (1996–1998); Haitai Tigers (2001)

Luis Andújar Sanchez (born November 22, 1972) is a Dominican former right-handed pitcher in Major League Baseball and the Korea Baseball Organization.

Andújar signed with the Chicago White Sox as an amateur free agent at age 18 and made his profession debut with that organisation. He was later traded to the Toronto Blue Jays, where he ended his major league career. Over his career Andújar made 20 starts and 15 relief appearances, and compiled a 3 -10 won-loss record. He later played one season with the Haitai Tigers of the KBO in 2001.
