= List of Memphis Chicks (Southern League) managers =

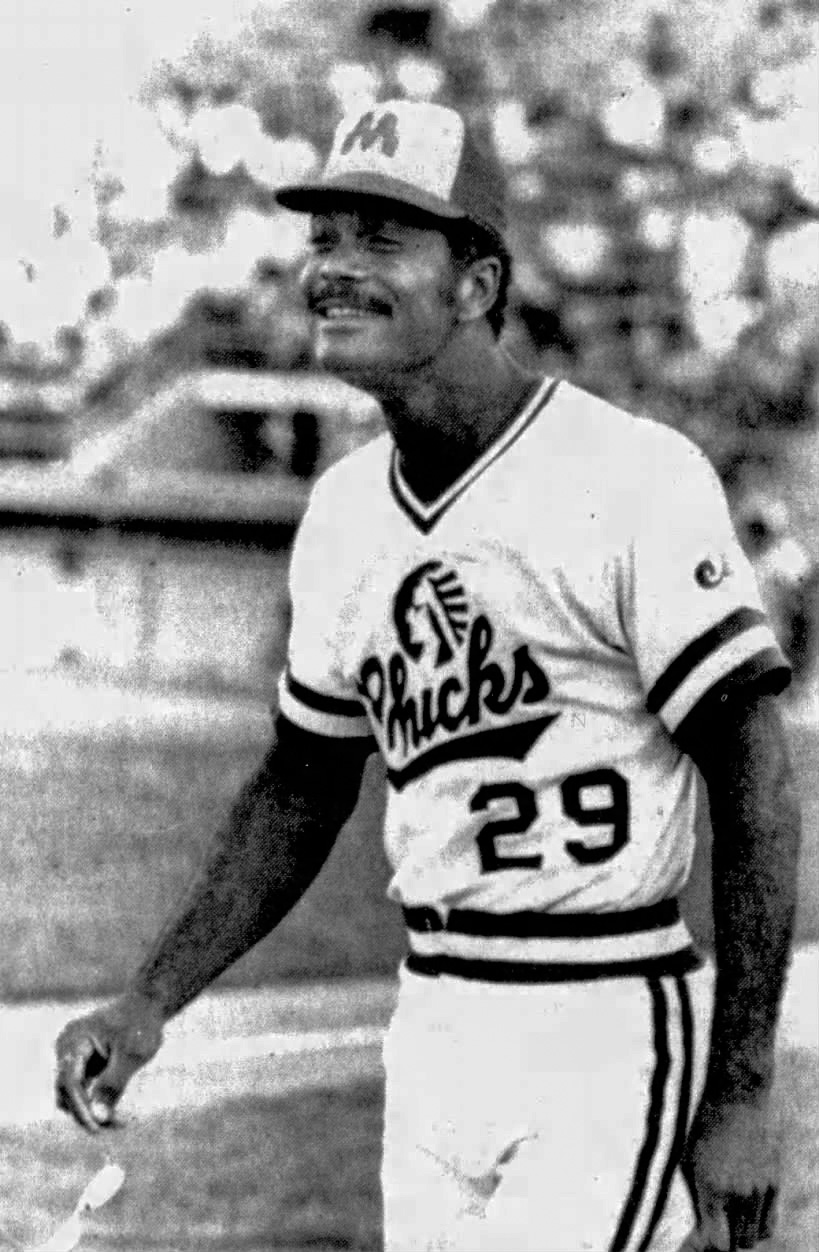
Felipe Alou managed the Chicks in 1978, winning 71 games in their inaugural season.

The Memphis Chicks were a Minor League Baseball team based in Memphis, Tennessee, that played at the Double-A level in the Southern League (SL) from 1978 to 1997. The franchise was established as an expansion team two years after the departure of the Memphis Blues and had no connection to the original Memphis Chicks of the Southern Association. Over its 20-year history, the club employed 16 managers. In baseball, the head coach of a team is known as the manager, or more formally, the field manager, and is responsible for team strategy and leadership on and off the field, including determining the batting order, arranging defensive positions, and making tactical decisions such as pitching changes, pinch-hitting, pinch-running, and defensive replacements.

At the conclusion of their franchise's history, Memphis' managers had led the club for 2,858 regular-season games in which they compiled a win–loss record of 1,418–1,439 (.496). In seven postseason appearances, their teams had a record of 15–21 (.417) and won one Southern League championship (1990). Combining all 2,894 regular-season and postseason games, the Chicks had an all-time record of 1,434–1,460 (.496).

Jeff Cox won 193 games over three seasons (1989–1991), placing him first on the all-time wins list for Chicks managers. Having managed the team for 431 games, he was also the longest-tenured manager in team history. The manager with the highest winning percentage over a full season or more was Ed Romero (1996), with .583. Conversely, the lowest winning percentage over a season or more was .448 by Jeff Cox.

== History ==
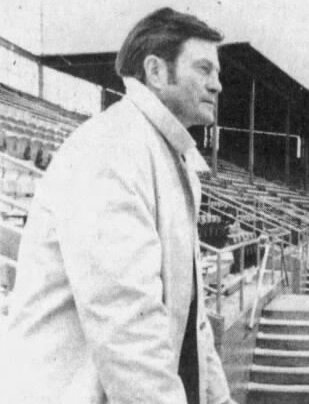
Billy Gardner managed the Chicks in 1979, winning 82 games.

In December 1977, the Montreal Expos, the Major League Baseball parent club of the Memphis Chicks, named Felipe Alou as manager of the newly established team. He led them to a 71–73 record in their inaugural 1978 season. Billy Gardner was selected to manage the 1979 squad, after having served as the Expos' first-base coach. Under Gardner, Memphis recorded an 82–62 mark, finishing the first half of the 1979 season tied for first place with the Montgomery Rebels. The Chicks defeated the Rebels in a one-game playoff, 2–1, to win the first-half title. However, Memphis lost in the Western Division series against the Nashville Sounds, two games to one. Gardner was promoted to manage Montreal's Triple-A affiliate, the Denver Bears, and Larry Bearnarth was hired as the next manager for the Chicks. Bearnarth ran the team for the next two seasons. His 1980 Chicks won the Western Division title over Nashville, 3–1, before losing the Southern League championship to the Charlotte Orioles, 3–1. Memphis qualified for the postseason again in 1981, only to fall in the division series against Nashville, 3–0.

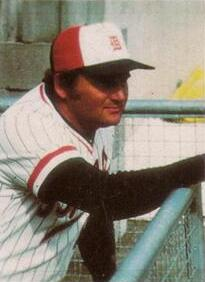
Rick Renick managed the Chicks from 1982 to 1983, winning 129 games.

From 1982 to 1988, no managerial term lasted longer than two complete seasons. Rick Renick was hired in December 1981 as the new manager of the Memphis Chicks, having served as the major league hitting instructor for the Kansas City Royals during the previous season. Renick managed the Chicks to 132 wins from 1982 to 1983, placing him fourth all-time in franchise victories. Renick was selected as a coach for the Southern League All-Stars in the 1983 Southern League All-Star Game. On August 12, 1983, Renick was ejected in the fourth inning of the second game of a doubleheader. Coach Larry Goldetsky took over for the rest of the night, which ended in Memphis' twelfth consecutive loss. On August 26, just before a game against the Chattanooga Lookouts, Renick was hospitalized after complaints of dizziness and chest pains. He was carried off the field at Engle Stadium on a stretcher and taken to Erlanger Medical Center. Goldetsky was appointed as manager for the Chicks for the remainder of the season, finishing with a 2–5 record.

Memphis ended their affiliation with the Montreal Expos after the 1983 season. Avron Fogelman, owner of the Memphis team, had purchased a 49 percent interest in the Kansas City Royals. The majority owner of the Royals, Ewing Kauffman, chose to move Kansas City's Double-A affiliation to Memphis for 1984. In November of that year, the Royals named Rick Mathews as the new Memphis manager. Mathews managed the 1984 team to a sub-.500 record. In November 1986, Tommy Jones became the next manager of the team after spending the last three seasons with the Royals' Class A affiliate, the Fort Myers Royals. From 1985 to 1986, Jones recorded 134 wins in 288 games, good for third all-time in franchise victories. Jones also coached the 1986 Southern League All-Stars. In November 1987, Jones was hired to manage the Albany-Colonie Yankees in the New York Yankees organization. This prompted Montreal management to hire Bob Schaefer, who was coming off of an Eastern League Manager of the Year Award after guiding the Glens Falls Tigers to the playoffs, as the next manager. Schaefer managed the 1987 Memphis Chicks to a winning record, however it was not enough to qualify for the postseason. At the conclusion of the campaign, Schaefer was succeeded by Sal Rende, following a promotion in October to become the first-base coach in Kansas City. Rende managed the 1988 Chicks into the postseason, their first appearance since 1981, but they were defeated by Chattanooga for the Western Division title, 3–1. After the season, Rende was promoted to manage the Triple-A Omaha Royals.

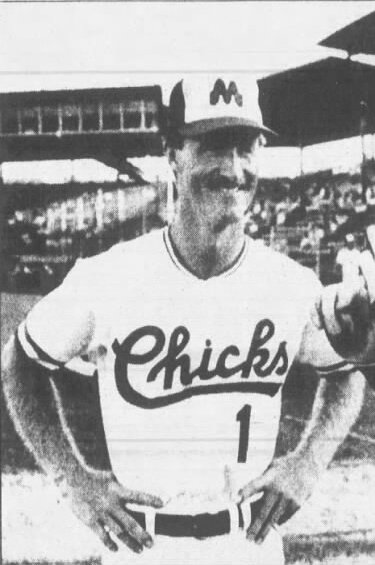
Tommy Jones managed the Chicks from 1985 to 1986, placing third all-time in franchise wins.

Jeff Cox, who spent part of the 1988 season in the Pittsburgh Pirates organization, was the next Chicks manager. He won 193 games from 1989 to 1991, placing him first on the all-time wins list for Memphis managers. Having managed the team for 431 games, he was also the longest-tenured manager in team history. In 1990, Cox's Chicks won the first-half Western Division title before defeating the Birmingham Barons in five games to advance to the SL championship series. The Chicks defeated the Orlando SunRays, 3–2, to win their first and only Southern League championship. Cox had also been selected to coach in that year's Southern League All-Star Game. At the end of the season, he was promoted to manage Triple-A Omaha, which resulted in Brian Poldberg, the hitting coach at Omaha, being hired to manage Memphis. Poldberg finished the 1992 campaign with 71 wins in 144 games. The Chicks had five different managers over their last five seasons of competition. Tom Poquette helmed the team in 1993. After finishing the season in last place in the Western Division in both halves, Poquette was replaced by Ron Johnson in 1994. In his only season as team manager, Johnson recorded a winning record, finishing 75–62, but was unable to qualify for the playoffs.

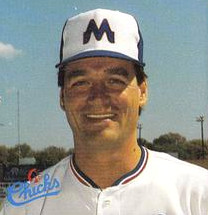
Sal Rende managed the Chicks in 1988, winning 80 games.

Memphis became the Double-A affiliate of the San Diego Padres in 1995. Jerry Royster was hired as the Chicks' manager to begin the new affiliation. He led the Chicks to the postseason via the first-half title, but fell to Chattanooga, 3–2, in the division series. At the end of the season, Royster was promoted to manage the Triple-A Las Vegas Stars, and Ed Romero was moved up from the Class A Clinton LumberKings to manage Memphis. Romero was the last Memphis manager to make the postseason, winning the first half but falling to Chattanooga for the second year in a row. Romero was chosen to manage the National League-affiliated All-Stars at the 1996 Double-A All-Star Game.

In 1997, their final season as a franchise, Memphis was affiliated with the Seattle Mariners. Dave Brundage, who had led Seattle's Class A-Advanced teams for two seasons, was promoted to Memphis, and managed the Chicks to a 67–72 record. With the arrival of the Memphis Redbirds, a Triple-A expansion team of the Pacific Coast League, the Southern League Chicks franchise relocated to Jackson, Tennessee, after the season to become the West Tenn Diamond Jaxx.

== Managers ==
Key
No.	A running total of the number of Chicks managers
†	Award winner or All-Star while managing the Chicks

Managers
No.	Manager	Season(s)	Regular-season				Postseason				Ref(s).
No.	Manager	Season(s)	Games	Wins	Losses	Win %	Appearances	Wins	Losses	Win %	Ref(s).
1	Felipe Alou	1978	144	71	73	.493	—	—	—	—	
2	Billy Gardner	1979	144	82	62	.569	1	1	2	.333	
3	Larry Bearnarth	1980–1981	287	160	127	.557	2	4	7	.364	
4	Rick Renick^{†}	1982–1983	283	129	154	.456	—	—	—	—	
5	Larry Goldetsky (Note: On August 12, 1983, Larry Goldetsky took over for a night after Renick was ejected in the fourth inning of the second game of a doubleheader. On August 26, Renick was hospitalized after complaints of dizziness and chest pains. Goldetsky was appointed as manager for the Chicks for the remainder of the season.)	1983	7	2	5	.286	—	—	—	—	
6	Rick Mathews	1984	146	71	75	.486	—	—	—	—	
7	Tommy Jones^{†}	1985–1986	288	134	154	.465	—	—	—	—	
8	Bob Schaefer	1987	143	72	71	.503	—	—	—	—	
9	Sal Rende	1988	143	79	64	.552	1	1	3	.250	
10	Jeff Cox^{†}	1989–1991	431	193	238	.448	1	6	3	.667	
11	Brian Poldberg	1992	144	71	73	.493	—	—	—	—	
12	Tom Poquette	1993	140	63	77	.450	—	—	—	—	
13	Ron Johnson	1994	137	75	62	.547	—	—	—	—	
14	Jerry Royster	1995	142	68	74	.479	1	2	3	.400	
15	Ed Romero^{†}	1996	139	81	58	.583	1	1	3	.250	
16	Dave Brundage	1997	139	67	72	.482	—	—	—	—	
Totals	16 managers	20 seasons	2,857	1,418	1,439	.496	7	15	21	.417	—
