= 1996 Kansas City Royals season =

1996 Kansas City Royals
- League: American League
- Division: Central
- Ballpark: Kauffman Stadium
- City: Kansas City, Missouri
- Record: 75–86 (.466)
- Divisional place: 5th
- Owners: David Glass
- General managers: Herk Robinson
- Managers: Bob Boone
- Television: KSMO-TV (Paul Splittorff, Steve Busby)
- Radio: WIBW (AM) (Denny Matthews, Fred White, John Wathan, Paul Splittorff)

The 1996 Kansas City Royals season was the 28th season for the franchise, and their 24th at Kauffman Stadium. The Royals finished fifth in the American League Central with a record of 75 wins and 86 losses and missed the postseason for the 11th consecutive season.

== Offseason ==
- October 22, 1995: Doug Linton was signed as a free agent by the Royals.
- December 19, 1995: Brent Mayne was traded by the Royals to the New York Mets for Al Shirley (minors).
- December 21, 1995: Wally Joyner and Aaron Dorlarque (minors) were traded by the Royals to the San Diego Padres for Bip Roberts and Bryan Wolff (minors).
- January 31, 1996: Tim Belcher was signed as a free agent by the Royals.

== Regular season ==
=== Season standings ===
AL Central
Team	W	L	Pct.	GB	Home	Road
Cleveland Indians	99	62	.615	—	51‍–‍29	48‍–‍33
Chicago White Sox	85	77	.525	14½	44‍–‍37	41‍–‍40
Milwaukee Brewers	80	82	.494	19½	38‍–‍43	42‍–‍39
Minnesota Twins	78	84	.481	21½	39‍–‍43	39‍–‍41
Kansas City Royals	75	86	.466	24	37‍–‍43	38‍–‍43

=== Record vs. opponents ===
1996 American League record Source: MLB Standings Grid – 1996
Team	BAL	BOS	CAL	CWS	CLE	DET	KC	MIL	MIN	NYY	OAK	SEA	TEX	TOR
Baltimore	—	7–6	6–6	4–8	5–7	11–2	9–3	9–3	7–5	3–10	9–4	7–5	3–10–1	8–5
Boston	6–7	—	8–4	6–6	1–11	12–1	3–9	7–5	6–6	7–6	8–5	7–6	6–6	8–5
California	6–6	4–8	—	6–6	4–9	6–6	4–8	7–5	4–8	7–6	6–7	5–8	4–9	7–5
Chicago	8–4	6–6	6–6	—	5–8	10–3	7–6	6–7	6–7	6–7	5–7	5–7	8–4	7–5
Cleveland	7–5	11–1	9–4	8–5	—	12–0	7–6	7–6	10–3	3–9	6–6	8–4	4–8	7–5
Detroit	2–11	1–12	6–6	3–10	0–12	—	6–6	4–8	6–6	5–8	4–8	6–6	4–9	6–7
Kansas City	3–9	9–3	8–4	6–7	6–7	6–6	—	4–9	6–7	4–8	5–7	7–5	6–6	5–8
Milwaukee	3–9	5–7	5–7	7–6	6–7	8–4	9–4	—	9–4	6–6	7–5	4–9	6–7	5–7
Minnesota	5–7	6–6	8–4	7–6	3–10	6–6	7–6	4–9	—	5–7	6–7	6–6	7–5	8–5
New York	10–3	6–7	6–7	7–6	9–3	8–5	8–4	6–6	7–5	—	9–3	3–9	5–7	8–5
Oakland	4–9	5–8	7–6	7–5	6–6	8–4	7–5	5–7	7–6	3–9	—	8–5	7–6	4–8
Seattle	5–7	6–7	8–5	7–5	4–8	6–6	5–7	9–4	6–6	9–3	5–8	—	10–3	5–7
Texas	10–3–1	6–6	9–4	4–8	8–4	9–4	6–6	7–6	5–7	7–5	6–7	3–10	—	10–2
Toronto	5–8	5–8	5–7	5–7	5–7	7–6	8–5	7–5	5–8	5–8	8–4	7–5	2–10	—

=== Game log ===
1996 Game Log: 75–86 (Home: 37–43; Away: 38–43)
April: 9–18 (Home: 4–10; Away: 5–8)

#	Date	Opponent	Score	Win	Loss	Save	Attendance	Record
	April 1	@ Orioles	Postponed (rain) Rescheduled for April 2					0–0
1	April 2	@ Orioles	2–4	Mussina	**Appier** (0–1)	Myers	46,818	0–1
2	April 3	@ Orioles	1–7	Wells	**Gubicza** (0–1)	—	40,068	0–2
3	April 4	@ Orioles	3–5	Rhodes	**Pichardo** (0–1)	Myers	38,753	0–3
4	April 5	Red Sox	5–4 (12)	**Clark** (1–0)	Pennington	—	39,526	1–3
5	April 6	Red Sox	7–3	**Pichardo** (1–1)	Belinda	—	17,339	2–3
6	April 7	Red Sox	1–3	Moyer	**Gubicza** (0–2)	Slocumb	13,183	2–4
7	April 9	@ Yankees	3–7	Pettitte	**Haney** (0–1)	—	56,329	2–5
8	April 11	@ Yankees	3–5	Key	**Belcher** (0–1)	Howe	17,519	2–6
9	April 12	@ Brewers	4–1	**Appier** (1–1)	Bones	**Montgomery** (1)	7,113	3–6
10	April 13	@ Brewers	3–2	**Gubicza** (1–2)	Sparks	**Montgomery** (2)	9,224	4–6
11	April 14	@ Brewers	2–5	McDonald	**Haney** (0–2)	Miranda	19,131	4–7
12	April 15	White Sox	10–11	Karchner	**Pichardo** (1–2)	Hernandez	12,653	4–8
13	April 16	White Sox	6–5	**Belcher** (1–1)	Bere	**Montgomery** (3)	12,399	5–8
14	April 17	White Sox	1–3	Fernandez	**Appier** (1–2)	Hernandez	13,350	5–9
15	April 18	Brewers	2–8	Sparks	**Gubicza** (1–3)	—	13,153	5–10
16	April 19	Brewers	2–8	McDonald	**Haney** (0–3)	—	15,321	5–11
17	April 20	Brewers	4–12	Miranda	**Jacome** (0–1)	—	17,220	5–12
18	April 21	Brewers	4–5	Wickander	**Pichardo** (1–3)	Fetters	14,666	5–13
19	April 22	Yankees	2–6	Cone	**Appier** (1–3)	—	14,763	5–14
20	April 23	Yankees	5–2	**Gubicza** (2–3)	Key	**Montgomery** (4)	12,536	6–14
21	April 24	Orioles	8–11	Mercker	**Haney** (0–4)	—	13,962	6–15
22	April 25	Orioles	2–3	Rhodes	**Valera** (0–1)	Myers	16,090	6–16
23	April 26	@ Red Sox	4–3	**Belcher** (2–1)	Clemens	**Montgomery** (5)	22,385	7–16
24	April 27	@ Red Sox	10–0	**Appier** (2–3)	Sele	—	29,459	8–16
25	April 28	@ Red Sox	9–7	**Robinson** (1–0)	Slocumb	**Montgomery** (6)	32,491	9–16
26	April 29	@ Twins	6–11	Hansell	**Clark** (1–1)	Bennett	10,237	9–17
27	April 30	@ Twins	7–16	Naulty	**Magnante** (0–1)	—	10,503	9–18

May: 15–12 (Home: 7–6; Away: 8–6)

#	Date	Opponent	Score	Win	Loss	Save	Attendance	Record
28	May 1	@ Twins	5–6 (10)	Stevens	**Montgomery** (0–1)	—	11,975	9–19
29	May 3	Athletics	3–1	**Appier** (3–3)	Reyes	**Montgomery** (7)	14,452	10–19
30	May 4	Athletics	2–5	Wojciechowski	**Gubicza** (2–4)	Groom	15,987	10–20
31	May 5	Athletics	2–0	**Haney** (1–4)	Prieto	—	16,589	11–20
32	May 6	@ Angels	9–4	**Belcher** (3–1)	Leftwich	**Pichardo** (1)	14,447	12–20
33	May 7	@ Angels	5–3	**Valera** (1–1)	Abbott	**Montgomery** (8)	14,657	13–20
34	May 8	@ Angels	3–1 (14)	**Pichardo** (2–3)	Eichhorn	—	16,210	14–20
35	May 9	@ Angels	8–2	**Gubicza** (3–4)	Grimsley	—	15,302	15–20
36	May 10	@ Mariners	14–10	**Valera** (2–1)	Davis	—	24,231	16–20
37	May 11	@ Mariners	1–11	Wolcott	**Belcher** (3–2)	Carmona	43,297	16–21
38	May 12	@ Mariners	5–8	Johnson	**Linton** (0–1)	Charlton	27,470	16–22
39	May 13	@ Rangers	6–7	Cook	**Montgomery** (0–2)	Henneman	22,981	16–23
40	May 14	@ Rangers	0–10	Hill	**Gubicza** (3–5)	—	28,999	16–24
41	May 15	@ Rangers	3–1	**Haney** (2–4)	Pavlik	**Montgomery** (9)	26,881	17–24
42	May 17	Blue Jays	4–2	**Belcher** (4–2)	Guzman	**Montgomery** (10)	20,079	18–24
43	May 18	Blue Jays	2–6	Viola	**Appier** (3–4)	—	18,116	18–25
44	May 19	Blue Jays	2–3	Hanson	**Gubicza** (3–6)	Timlin	15,039	18–26
45	May 20	Blue Jays	5–4	**Haney** (3–4)	Hentgen	**Montgomery** (11)	14,303	19–26
46	May 21	@ Tigers	7–1	**Linton** (1–1)	Williams	**Valera** (1)	24,372	20–26
47	May 22	@ Tigers	6–4	**Belcher** (5–2)	Farrell	**Montgomery** (12)	12,890	21–26
48	May 23	Rangers	4–2	**Appier** (4–4)	Oliver	**Montgomery** (13)	15,612	22–26
49	May 24	Rangers	8–0	**Gubicza** (4–6)	Witt	—	13,696	23–26
50	May 25	Rangers	1–2	Helling	**Haney** (3–5)	Henneman	23,668	23–27
51	May 26	Rangers	4–6	Hill	**Linton** (1–2)	Henneman	22,665	23–28
52	May 27	Tigers	5–4 (13)	**Montgomery** (1–2)	Veres	—	19,776	24–28
53	May 29	Tigers	4–5	Gohr	**Appier** (4–5)	Walker	13,712	24–29
54	May 31	@ Blue Jays	2–4	Hentgen	**Gubicza** (4–7)	Timlin	33,194	24–30

June: 10–17 (Home: 6–10; Away: 4–7)

#	Date	Opponent	Score	Win	Loss	Save	Attendance	Record
55	June 1	@ Blue Jays	3–5 (10)	Crabtree	**Montgomery** (1–3)	—	31,107	24–31
56	June 2	@ Blue Jays	7–5	**Belcher** (6–2)	Janzen	**Montgomery** (14)	32,253	25–31
57	June 3	@ Athletics	1–2	Wasdin	**Appier** (4–6)	Taylor	6,465	25–32
58	June 4	@ Athletics	3–8	Wengert	**Gubicza** (4–8)	—	11,524	25–33
59	June 5	@ Athletics	5–2	**Haney** (4–5)	Johns	**Montgomery** (15)	8,113	26–33
60	June 7	Mariners	9–5	**Valera** (3–1)	Wolcott	—	20,891	27–33
61	June 8	Mariners	12–8	**Appier** (5–6)	Milacki	**Montgomery** (16)	30,022	28–33
62	June 9	Mariners	2–3	Hitchcock	**Gubicza** (4–9)	Charlton	20,489	28–34
63	June 10	Angels	5–7 (10)	McElroy	**Pugh** (0–1)	Percival	15,691	28–35
64	June 11	Angels	9–11	McElroy	**Valera** (3–2)	Percival	16,687	28–36
65	June 12	Angels	3–4 (10)	McElroy	**Montgomery** (1–4)	Percival	15,428	28–37
66	June 13	Orioles	10–2	**Linton** (2–2)	Mercker	—	20,108	29–37
67	June 14	Orioles	1–6	Mussina	**Gubicza** (4–10)	—	28,502	29–38
68	June 15	Orioles	7–6 (16)	**Magnante** (1–1)	Krivda	—	24,784	30–38
69	June 16	Orioles	5–13	Coppinger	**Jacome** (0–2)	Mills	19,437	30–39
70	June 17	@ Brewers	4–9	Burrows	**Appier** (5–7)	—	9,315	30–40
71	June 18	@ Brewers	1–9	Karl	**Linton** (2–3)	Potts	9,116	30–41
72	June 19	@ Brewers	8–4 (10)	**Pichardo** (3–3)	Mercedes	—	13,431	31–41
73	June 21	@ Orioles	3–9	Rhodes	**Haney** (4–6)	—	47,644	31–42
74	June 22	@ Orioles	3–5	Erickson	**Montgomery** (1–5)	—	47,534	31–43
75	June 23	@ Orioles	4–0	**Appier** (6–7)	Krivda	—	47,608	32–43
76	June 25	Brewers	3–5	Bones	**Gubicza** (4–11)	Fetters	14,448	32–44
77	June 26	Brewers	7–3	**Haney** (5–6)	Givens	—	14,560	33–44
78	June 27	Brewers	2–6	McDonald	**Belcher** (6–3)	—	17,670	33–45
79	June 28	Twins	6–2	**Appier** (7–7)	Radke	—	21,515	34–45
80	June 29	Twins	7–12	Trombley	**Linton** (2–4)	—	23,232	34–46
81	June 30	Twins	2–5	Rodriguez	**Gubicza** (4–12)	Stevens	28,246	34–47

July: 14–13 (Home: 4–5; Away: 10–8)

#	Date	Opponent	Score	Win	Loss	Save	Attendance	Record
82	July 1	@ Indians	4–2	**Haney** (6–6)	Nagy	—	40,814	35–47
83	July 2	@ Indians	2–3	Poole	**Belcher** (6–4)	—	42,283	35–48
84	July 3	@ Indians	4–6	Tavarez	**Magnante** (1–2)	Shuey	42,470	35–49
85	July 4	@ Twins	5–3	**Linton** (3–4)	Robertson	**Montgomery** (17)	37,295	36–49
86	July 5	@ Twins	8–9	Guardado	**Montgomery** (1–6)	—	18,465	36–50
87	July 6	@ Twins	8–5	**Haney** (7–6)	Aguilera	**Montgomery** (18)	18,699	37–50
88	July 7	@ Twins	8–2	**Belcher** (7–4)	Aldred	—	14,251	38–50
89	July 11	White Sox	3–2	**Haney** (8–6)	Alvarez	—	22,928	39–50
90	July 12	White Sox	6–7	Tapani	**Belcher** (7–5)	Hernandez	18,458	39–51
91	July 13	White Sox	1–3	Fernandez	**Rosado** (0–1)	—	25,363	39–52
92	July 14	White Sox	2–3	Baldwin	**Linton** (3–5)	Hernandez	17,024	39–53
93	July 15	Indians	6–3	**Magnante** (2–2)	Tavarez	**Montgomery** (19)	22,294	40–53
94	July 16	Indians	4–10	McDowell	**Haney** (8–7)	—	16,871	40–54
95	July 17	Indians	3–2	**Belcher** (8–5)	Hershiser	**Montgomery** (20)	19,532	41–54
96	July 18	@ White Sox	7–1	**Appier** (8–7)	Fernandez	**Pichardo** (2)	17,657	42–54
97	July 19	@ White Sox	7–4 (10)	**Montgomery** (2–6)	Hernandez	—	19,604	43–54
98	July 20	@ White Sox	7–5	**Linton** (4–5)	Keyser	**Montgomery** (21)	32,282	44–54
99	July 21	@ White Sox	3–6	Alvarez	**Haney** (8–8)	Hernandez	21,253	44–55
100	July 22	@ Red Sox	5–2	**Belcher** (9–5)	Gordon	—	28,109	45–55
101	July 23	@ Red Sox	7–5	**Appier** (9–7)	Sele	—	23,711	46–55
102	July 24	@ Red Sox	2–12	Moyer	**Linton** (4–6)	—	33,381	46–56
103	July 25	@ Yankees	7–0	**Rosado** (1–1)	Hutton	—	23,475	47–56
104	July 26	@ Yankees	1–15	Key	**Haney** (8–9)	—	23,782	47–57
105	July 27	@ Yankees	4–5	Rogers	**Belcher** (9–6)	Wetteland	42,044	47–58
106	July 28	@ Yankees	2–3	Wetteland	**Jacome** (0–3)	—	35,658	47–59
107	July 30	Red Sox	7–0	**Rosado** (2–1)	Eshelman	—	17,166	48–59
108	July 31	Red Sox	3–5	Wakefield	**Haney** (8–10)	Slocumb	17,527	48–60

August: 14–15 (Home: 8–9; Away: 6–6)

#	Date	Opponent	Score	Win	Loss	Save	Attendance	Record
109	August 1	Red Sox	9–4	**Belcher** (10–6)	Clemens	—	18,934	49–60
110	August 2	Yankees	4–3 (10)	**Montgomery** (3–6)	Rivera	—	28,618	50–60
111	August 3	Yankees	11–4	**Linton** (5–6)	Weathers	—	29,355	51–60
112	August 4	Yankees	3–5	Pettitte	**Rosado** (2–2)	—	24,624	51–61
113	August 5	Yankees	2–5	Key	**Pichardo** (3–4)	Wetteland	22,865	51–62
114	August 6	Athletics	9–2	**Belcher** (11–6)	Wasdin	—	14,028	52–62
115	August 7	Athletics	7–0	**Appier** (10–7)	Prieto	—	15,517	53–62
116	August 8	Athletics	1–2	Wengert	**Linton** (5–7)	Taylor	19,197	53–63
117	August 9	@ Angels	5–3	**Rosado** (3–2)	Langston	**Montgomery** (22)	35,977	54–63
118	August 10	@ Angels	18–3	**Haney** (9–10)	Abbott	—	21,657	55–63
119	August 11	@ Angels	5–6	Springer	**Belcher** (11–7)	—	18,591	55–64
120	August 12	@ Mariners	10–4	**Appier** (11–7)	Moyer	**Huisman** (1)	43,476	56–64
121	August 13	@ Mariners	5–9	Mulholland	**Linton** (5–8)	Johnson	21,961	56–65
122	August 14	@ Mariners	3–1	**Rosado** (4–2)	Wolcott	**Montgomery** (23)	23,709	57–65
123	August 16	@ Rangers	3–5	Burkett	**Haney** (9–11)	Henneman	32,053	57–66
124	August 17	@ Rangers	4–1	**Belcher** (12–7)	Hill	—	41,855	58–66
125	August 18	@ Rangers	3–10	Gross	**Appier** (11–8)	—	30,480	58–67
126	August 19	Blue Jays	1–2	Spoljaric	**Rosado** (4–3)	Timlin	16,862	58–68
127	August 20	Blue Jays	5–6 (14)	Timlin	**Huisman** (0–1)	—	14,568	58–69
128	August 21	Blue Jays	2–6	Guzman	**Haney** (9–12)	—	12,238	58–70
129	August 22	Tigers	3–10	Thompson	**Belcher** (12–8)	—	14,699	58–71
130	August 23	Tigers	2–3	Sager	**Appier** (11–9)	Olson	15,603	58–72
131	August 24	Tigers	9–2	**Rosado** (5–3)	Olivares	—	28,011	59–72
132	August 25	Tigers	4–7	Van Poppel	**Linton** (5–9)	Myers	15,123	59–73
133	August 27	Rangers	4–3 (10)	**Montgomery** (4–6)	Russell	—	12,907	60–73
134	August 28	Rangers	4–3 (12)	**Huisman** (1–1)	Gross	—	12,695	61–73
135	August 29	@ Tigers	1–4	Eischen	**Appier** (11–10)	Lima	7,882	61–74
136	August 30	@ Tigers	0–4	Van Poppel	**Rosado** (5–4)	—	16,498	61–75
137	August 31	@ Tigers	3–1	**Linton** (6–9)	Lira	**Montgomery** (24)	16,270	62–75

September: 13–11 (Home: 8–3; Away: 5–8)

#	Date	Opponent	Score	Win	Loss	Save	Attendance	Record
138	September 1	@ Tigers	3–2 (13)	**Huisman** (2–1)	Myers	**Jacome** (1)	17,647	63–75
139	September 2	@ Blue Jays	2–0	**Belcher** (13–8)	Hanson	—	28,177	64–75
140	September 3	@ Blue Jays	5–2	**Appier** (12–10)	Hentgen	—	25,729	65–75
141	September 4	@ Blue Jays	0–6	Williams	**Rosado** (5–5)	—	25,827	65–76
142	September 6	@ Athletics	1–7	Adams	**Haney** (9–13)	—	14,404	65–77
143	September 7	@ Athletics	6–13	Prieto	**Belcher** (13–9)	—	13,175	65–78
144	September 8	@ Athletics	7–8 (10)	Corsi	**Pichardo** (3–5)	—	17,208	65–79
145	September 10	Mariners	4–2	**Rosado** (6–5)	Torres	**Bluma** (1)	12,499	66–79
146	September 11	Mariners	4–2	**Linton** (7–9)	Moyer	**Bluma** (2)	13,078	67–79
147	September 12	Mariners	5–8	Mulholland	**Haney** (9–14)	Charlton	15,045	67–80
148	September 13	Angels	8–2	**Belcher** (14–9)	Abbott	—	13,083	68–80
149	September 14	Angels	8–5	**Appier** (13–10)	Dickson	—	17,174	69–80
	September 15	Angels	Cancelled (rain)					69–80
150	September 16	Twins	6–5	**Rosado** (7–5)	Radke	**Bluma** (3)	16,843	70–80
151	September 17	Twins	4–2	**Haney** (10–14)	Aldred	**Bluma** (4)	11,809	71–80
152	September 18	Twins	4–7	Miller	**Belcher** (14–10)	—	11,588	71–81
153	September 19	@ Indians	1–9	Ogea	**Appier** (13–11)	—	42,297	71–82
154	September 20	@ Indians	6–4	**Bevil** (1–0)	Nagy	**Bluma** (5)	42,358	72–82
155	September 21	@ Indians	4–13	Hershiser	**Rosado** (7–6)	—	42,339	72–83
156	September 22	@ Indians	5–6	McDowell	**Jacome** (0–4)	Mesa	42,291	72–84
157	September 24	@ White Sox	2–3	Castillo	**Belcher** (14–11)	—	14,348	72–85
158	September 25	@ White Sox	8–2	**Appier** (14–11)	Tapani	—	15,911	73–85
159	September 27	Indians	11–6	**Rosado** (8–6)	Hershiser	—	15,939	74–85
160	September 28	Indians	4–5	Mercker	**Scanlan** (0–1)	Mesa	19,820	74–86
161	September 29	Indians	4–1	**Belcher** (15–11)	Ogea	**Pichardo** (3)	14,556	75–86

Legend: = Win = Loss = Game Postponed
Bold = Royals team member

=== Detailed records ===
American League
Opponent	W	L	WP	RS	RA
AL East
Baltimore Orioles	3	9	0.250	49	71
Boston Red Sox	9	3	0.750	69	48
Detroit Tigers	6	6	0.500	47	47
New York Yankees	4	8	0.333	47	60
Toronto Blue Jays	5	8	0.385	40	51
Total	27	34	0.443	252	277
AL Central
Chicago White Sox	6	7	0.462	63	55
Cleveland Indians	6	7	0.462	58	70
**Kansas City Royals**					
Milwaukee Brewers	4	9	0.308	46	77
Minnesota Twins	6	7	0.462	76	85
Total	22	30	0.423	243	287
AL West
California Angels	8	4	0.667	86	51
Oakland Athletics	5	7	0.417	47	50
Seattle Mariners	7	5	0.583	74	71
Texas Rangers	6	6	0.500	44	50
Total	26	22	0.542	251	222
Season Total	75	86	0.466	746	786

Month	Games	Won	Lost	Win %	RS	RA
April	27	9	18	0.333	116	157
May	27	15	12	0.556	120	112
June	27	10	17	0.370	132	156
July	27	14	13	0.519	126	123
August	29	14	15	0.483	140	118
September	24	13	11	0.542	112	120
Total	161	75	86	0.466	746	786

	Games	Won	Lost	Win %	RS	RA
Home	80	37	43	0.463	372	369
Away	81	38	43	0.469	374	417
Total	161	75	86	0.466	746	786

=== Roster ===
1996 Kansas City Royals
**Roster**
**Pitchers**: 17 Kevin Appier; 41 Tim Belcher; 47 Brian Bevil; 46 Jaime Bluma; 24 Terry Clark; 27 Jeff Granger; 23 Mark Gubicza; 33 Chris Haney; 37 Rick Huisman; 45 Jason Jacome; 49 Doug Linton; 57 Mike Magnante; 21 Jeff Montgomery; 35 Hipólito Pichardo; 46 Tim Pugh; 50 Kenny Robinson; 50 José Rosado; 24 Bob Scanlan; 51 Julio Valera	**Catchers**: 26 Sal Fasano; 15 Mike Macfarlane; 36 Henry Mercedes; 29 Mike Sweeney; **Infielders**: 3 Bob Hamelin; 6 David Howard; 4 Keith Lockhart; 30 José Offerman; 12 Craig Paquette; 16 Joe Randa; 1 Bip Roberts; 44 Joe Vitiello; 32 Kevin Young	**Outfielders**: 18 Johnny Damon; 42 Tom Goodwin; 46 Patrick Lennon; 58 Rod Myers; 25 Les Norman; 22 Jon Nunnally; 14 Chris Stynes; 31 Michael Tucker	**Manager**: 8 Bob Boone; **Coaches**: 56 Tim Foli; 55 Guy Hansen; 54 Bruce Kison; 19 Greg Luzinski; 39 Mitchell Page; 9 Jamie Quirk (bench)

== Player stats ==
=== Batting ===
==== Starters by position ====
Note: Pos = Position; G = Games played; AB = At bats; H = Hits; Avg. = Batting average; HR = Home runs; RBI = Runs batted in

Pos	Player	G	AB	H	Avg.	HR	RBI
C	Mike MacFarlane	112	379	104	.274	19	54
1B	José Offerman	151	561	170	.303	5	47
2B	Keith Lockhart	138	433	118	.273	7	55
SS	David Howard	143	420	92	.219	4	48
3B	Joe Randa	110	337	102	.303	6	47
LF	Tom Goodwin	143	524	148	.282	1	35
CF	Johnny Damon	145	517	140	.271	6	50
RF	Michael Tucker	108	339	88	.260	12	53
DH	Joe Vitiello	85	257	62	.241	8	40

==== Other batters ====
Note: G = Games played; AB = At bats; H = Hits; Avg. = Batting average; HR = Home runs; RBI = Runs batted in

Player	G	AB	H	Avg.	HR	RBI
Craig Paquette	118	429	111	.259	22	67
Bip Roberts	90	339	96	.283	0	52
Bob Hamelin	89	239	61	.255	9	40
Mike Sweeney	50	165	46	.279	4	24
Sal Fasano	51	143	29	.203	6	19
Kevin Young	55	132	32	.242	8	23
Chris Stynes	36	92	27	.243	0	6
Jon Nunnally	35	90	19	.211	5	17
Rod Myers	22	63	18	.286	1	11
Les Norman	54	49	6	.122	0	0
Patrick Lennon	14	30	7	.233	0	1
Henry Mercedes	4	4	1	.250	0	0

=== Pitching ===
==== Starting pitchers ====
Note: G = Games pitched; IP = Innings pitched; W = Wins; L = Losses; ERA = Earned run average; SO = Strikeouts

Player	G	IP	W	L	ERA	SO
Tim Belcher	35	238.2	15	11	3.92	113
Chris Haney	35	228.0	10	14	4.70	115
Kevin Appier	32	211.1	14	11	3.62	207
Mark Gubicza	19	119.1	4	12	5.13	55
José Rosado	16	106.2	8	6	3.21	64
Doug Linton	21	104.0	7	9	5.02	87

==== Other pitchers ====
Note: G = Games pitched; IP = Innings pitched; W = Wins; L = Losses; ERA = Earned run average; SO = Strikeouts

Player	G	IP	W	L	ERA	SO
Brian Bevil	3	11.0	1	0	5.73	7

==== Relief pitchers ====
Note: G = Games pitched; W = Wins; L = Losses; SV = Saves; ERA = Earned run average; SO = Strikeouts

Player	G	W	L	SV	ERA	SO
Jeff Montgomery	48	4	6	24	4.26	45
Hipólito Pichardo	57	3	5	3	5.43	43
Jason Jacome	49	0	4	1	4.72	32
Mike Magnante	38	2	2	0	5.67	32
Julio Valera	31	3	2	1	6.46	31
Rick Huisman	22	2	1	1	4.60	23
Tim Pugh	19	0	1	0	5.45	27
Jaime Bluma	17	0	0	5	3.60	14
Jeff Granger	15	0	0	0	6.61	11
Terry Clark	12	1	1	0	7.79	12
Bob Scanlan	9	0	1	0	3.18	3
Kenny Robinson	5	1	0	0	6.00	5

== Farm system ==
Level	Team	League	Manager
AAA	Omaha Royals	American Association	Mike Jirschele
AA	Wichita Wranglers	Texas League	Ron Johnson
A	Wilmington Blue Rocks	Carolina League	John Mizerock
A	Lansing Lugnuts	Midwest League	Brian Poldberg
A-Short Season	Spokane Indians	Northwest League	Bob Herold
Rookie	GCL Royals	Gulf Coast League	Al Pedrique

LEAGUE CHAMPIONS: Wilmington
