= Double-A All-Star Game =

Exhibition game played by Minor League Baseball players

- Status: Defunct
- Frequency: Annual
- Location: Varied (see prose)
- Years active: 12
- Inaugurated: July 10, 1991 (Joe W. Davis Stadium, Huntsville, Alabama, United States)
- Most recent: July 10, 2002 (Senator Thomas J. Dodd Memorial Stadium, Norwich, Connecticut, United States)
- Participants: Double-A minor league baseball players
- Organizer: Double-A Baseball

The Double-A All-Star Game was an annual baseball game held from 1991 to 2002 between professional players from the affiliated Double-A leagues of Minor League Baseball—the Eastern League (EL), Southern League (SL), and Texas League (TL). Teams of American League-affiliated Double-A All-Stars faced off against teams of National League-affiliated Double-A All-Stars. Seven games were won by American League teams, and five were won by National League teams.

== History ==
The three Double-A leagues of Minor League Baseball—the Eastern League (EL), Southern League (SL), and Texas League (TL)—were inspired by the success of the Triple-A All-Star Game, which was first held in 1988, to combine for their own meeting of their classification's All-Stars. The first Double-A All-Star game was played in 1991 at Joe W. Davis Stadium in Huntsville, Alabama. Players were divided into teams of American League affiliates and National League affiliates as voted on by members of the local media in each of the classification's 26 cities. In later years, teams were selected by the three league presidents.

Despite the game's initial commercial success, the travel logistics involving teams stretching from El Paso, Texas, to Altoona, Pennsylvania, made organizing the game difficult. The creation of the All-Star Futures Game in 1999 drew away both publicity and players. The final Double-A All-Star Game was played in 2002 at Senator Thomas J. Dodd Memorial Stadium in Norwich, Connecticut.

== Results ==
Date	Winning team (All-time record)	Score	City	Ballpark	Host team (league)	Attendance	Ref.
July 10, 1991	American (1–0 AL)	8–2	Huntsville, Alabama	Joe W. Davis Stadium	Huntsville Stars (SL)	4,022	
July 13, 1992	American (2–0 AL)	4–3	Charlotte, North Carolina	Knights Stadium	Charlotte Knights (SL)	4,009	
July 12, 1993	National (1–2 NL)	12–7	Memphis, Tennessee	Tim McCarver Stadium	Memphis Chicks (SL)	6,335	
July 11, 1994	American (3–1 AL)	10–4	Binghamton, New York	Binghamton Municipal Stadium	Binghamton Mets (EL)	6,543	
July 10, 1995	American (4–1 AL)	3–1	Shreveport, Louisiana	Fair Grounds Field	Shreveport Captains (TL)	6,247	
July 8, 1996	National (2–4 NL)	6–2	Trenton, New Jersey	Mercer County Waterfront Park	Trenton Thunder (EL)	8,369	
July 7, 1997	American (5–2 AL)	4–0	San Antonio, Texas	Nelson W. Wolff Municipal Stadium	San Antonio Missions (TL)	7,114	
July 8, 1998	National (3–5 NL)	2–1	West Haven, Connecticut	Yale Field	New Haven Ravens (EL)	6,248	
July 14, 1999	National (4–5 NL)	3–0	Mobile, Alabama	Hank Aaron Stadium	Mobile BayBears (SL)	6,174	
July 12, 2000	American (6–4 AL)	5–2	Bowie, Maryland	Prince George's Stadium	Bowie Baysox (EL)	14,077	
July 11, 2001	National (5–6 NL)	8–3	Round Rock, Texas	Dell Diamond	Round Rock Express (TL)	12,046	
July 10, 2002	American (7–5 AL)	11–2	Norwich, Connecticut	Senator Thomas J. Dodd Memorial Stadium	Norwich Navigators (EL)	8,009	

American League (7 wins)	National League (5 wins)

== Most Valuable Player Award ==
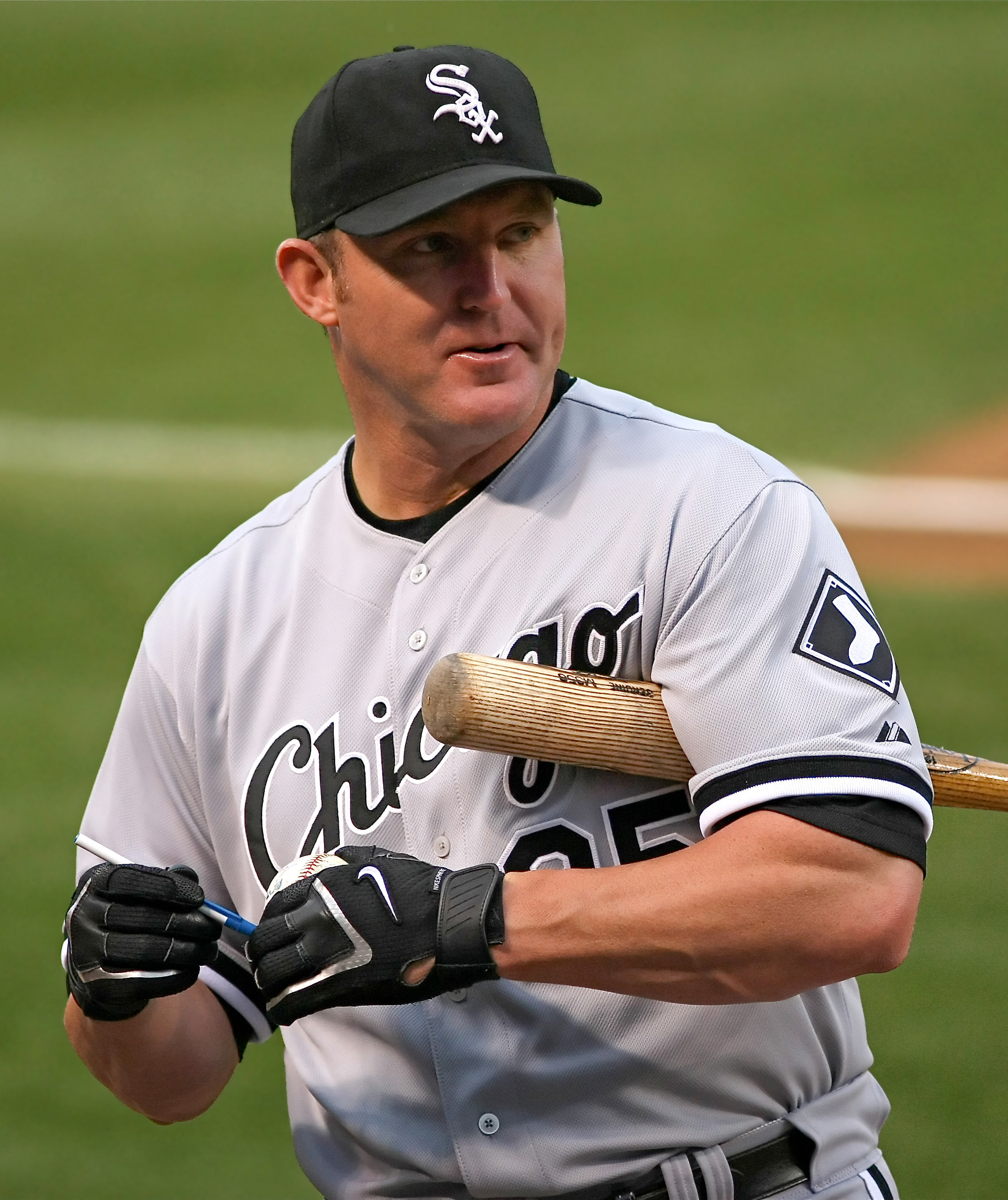
Jim Thome, the 1991 Eastern League MVP, became a five-time MLB All-Star and was enducted into the Baseball Hall of Fame in 2018.

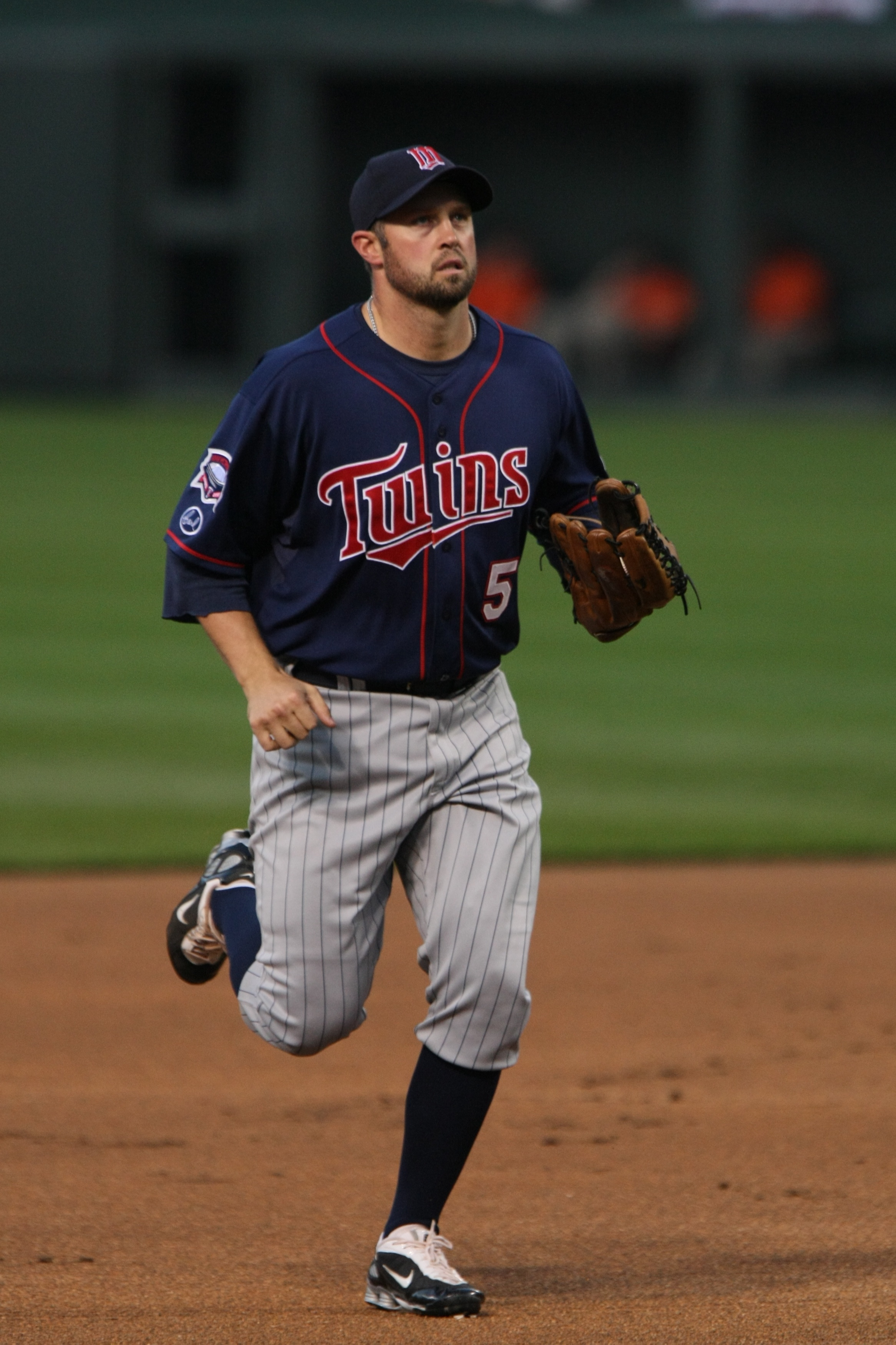
Michael Cuddyer, the 2001 Eastern League MVP, was voted onto two MLB All-Star teams.

Through 1996, a Most Valuable Player (MVP) Award was given to the player with the best performance from each Double-A league. One award was planned for the overall Most Valuable Player in 1997, but two players were selected as co-MVPs. Single MVPs were also selected in 1998 and 2000. In the final two years of contention, 2001 and 2002, the classification reverted to the original format and selected three MVPs, one from each league.

Three players from the El Paso Diablos and Huntsville Stars were each selected for MVP Awards, more than any other teams. The Harrisburg Senators, Knoxville/Tennessee Smokies, Memphis Chicks, Midland Angels/RockHounds, New Britain Red Sox/Rock Cats, and Orlando SunRays/Cubs each had two MVPs.

Year	EL MVP	SL MVP	TL MVP	Ref(s).
1991	Jim Thome (Canton-Akron Indians, 3B)	Pat Mahomes (Orlando SunRays, RP)	Mark Howie (Midland Angels, DH)	
1992	Len Picota (Harrisburg Senators, RP)	Marcos Armas (Huntsville Stars, 1B)	Jon Shave (Tulsa Drillers, 2B)	
1993	Rondell White (Harrisburg Senators, OF)	Les Norman (Memphis Chicks, RF)	Dwayne Hosey (Wichita Wranglers, LF)	
1994	Matt Stairs (New Britain Red Sox, LF)	Chris Stynes (Knoxville Smokies, 2B)	Tim Unroe (El Paso Diablos, 3B)	
1995	Pork Chop Pough (Trenton Thunder, DH)	Jason Thompson (Memphis Chicks, 1B)	Brian Banks (El Paso Diablos, RF)	
1996	Todd Dunwoody (Portland Sea Dogs, OF)	Kevin Orie (Orlando Cubs, 3B)	Russ Johnson (Jackson Generals, SS)	
1997	Mel Rosario (Bowie Baysox, C)	Mike Coolbaugh (Huntsville Stars, SS)	—	
1998	Wonder Monds (New Haven Ravens, CF)	—	—	
1999 (Note: There are no records of an MVP being selected in 1999.)	—	—	—	
2000	—	Stoney Briggs (Jacksonville Suns, OF)	—	
2001	Michael Cuddyer (New Britain Rock Cats, 3B)	Dave Gibralter (Huntsville Stars, 3B)	Lyle Overbay (El Paso Diablos, 1B)	
2002	Jorge Sequea (Erie SeaWolves, {PR/3B)	DeWayne Wise (Tennessee Smokies, CF)	Marshall McDougall (Midland RockHounds, SS)	

== See also ==
- Southern League All-Star Game
