= Memphis Chicks =

Memphis Chicks may refer to:

- Memphis Chicks (Southern Association), a Minor League Baseball team that played from 1901 to 1960
- Memphis Chicks (Southern League), a Minor League Baseball team that played from 1978 to 1997
