= Jaime Bluma =

American baseball player (born 1972)

- Pitcher
- Born: May 18, 1972 (age 54); Beaufort, South Carolina, U.S.
- Batted: Right Threw: Right

MLB debut
- August 9, 1996, for the Kansas City Royals

Last MLB appearance
- September 27, 1996, for the Kansas City Royals

MLB statistics
- Win–loss record: 0–0
- Earned run average: 3.60
- Strikeouts: 14
- Stats at Baseball Reference

Teams
- Kansas City Royals (1996)

James Andrew Bluma (born May 18, 1972) is an American former Major League Baseball pitcher who played for one season. He pitched in 17 games for the Kansas City Royals during the 1996 Kansas City Royals season. Bluma is member of the Sports Hall of Fame at his alma mater, Wichita State University.

== Career ==
=== High school and college ===
Jaime Bluma was born in Beaufort, South Carolina and later raised in Owasso, Oklahoma where he played high school baseball. As a senior in 1990 he was selected to the Oklahoma All-State baseball team. He attended Wichita State University where he set several records for the Shockers baseball program, and is still the schools all-time leader in saves and appearances. Bluma played in the College World Series three consecutive years with the Shockers, posting a 3–0 win/loss record with two saves and a 0.48 ERA. In 1992, he played collegiate summer baseball with the Hyannis Mets of the Cape Cod Baseball League. He was selected to both the All-Missouri Valley Conference baseball, and All-Missouri Valley All-Academic team in both 1993 and 1994. He graduated from Wichita State with a degree in psychology. Bluma was inducted into the Wichita State Hall of Fame in 2001.

=== Professional baseball ===
Jaime Bluma was a seventh round pick by the Houston Astros in the 1993 MLB draft but chose not to sign and returned for his final year of college. The next year he was a third round pick by the Kansas City Royals in the 1994 Major League Baseball draft and signed in early June. He split that season between Royals farm system teams in Eugene, Oregon and Wilmington, Delaware. Bluma continued a steady rise through the ranks in 1995 while pitching for the Wichita Wranglers, the Royals Double A baseball affiliate, and Triple A Omaha Royals. He began the 1996 season with Omaha, but was called up by Kansas City on August 9. His career in the majors would be brief however due to injury. Bluma pitched twenty innings in seventeen appearances as a Royal, earning five saves while giving up eighteen hits, two home runs, and striking out fourteen batters for a 3.60 ERA. His last appearance for KC came on September 27, 1996. Shoulder surgery later that year forced Bluma to miss the entire 1997 baseball season and he never again pitched at the big league level. He would split time between the Royals Double A and Triple A teams in Wichita and Omaha in 1998, 1999, and 2000 before retiring from active play. Jaime Bluma turned to coaching after leaving the pitchers mound, serving as assistant general manager of the Old Ball Game training academy from 2001 to 2006. He also spent two summers, 2003 and 2004, as pitching coach for the Anchorage Glacier Pilots, a Collegiate Summer Baseball team. In the latter capacity he helped mentor future major leaguers like Mike Zagurski, Mike Pelfrey and Jacoby Ellsbury.

== Later life ==
Bluma now resides in the Kansas City area and works as a pitching coach at Kansas City Sports Club. In December, 2013 Bluma was injured while assisting in the rescue of a young family involved in a traffic accident. While helping to retrieve two small children from a rollover crash Bluma suffered a full rupture of his patella tendon. His injury turned out to be the most serious of all parties involved, with all others receiving only minor injuries.
