= Duane Walker =

American baseball player (born 1957)

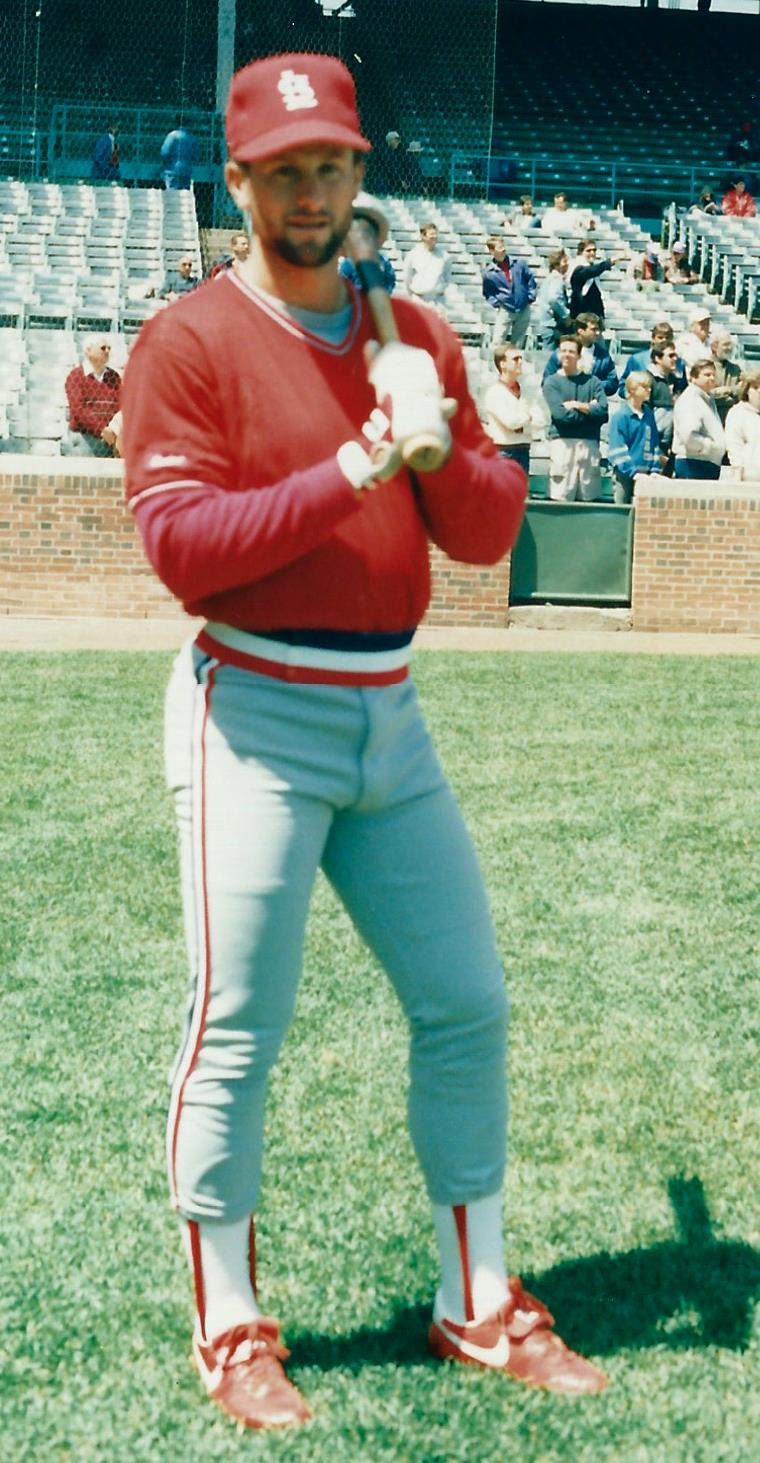
- Outfielder
- Born: March 13, 1957 (age 69); Pasadena, Texas, U.S.
- Batted: Left Threw: Left

MLB debut
- May 25, 1982, for the Cincinnati Reds

Last MLB appearance
- July 18, 1988, for the St. Louis Cardinals

MLB statistics
- Batting average: .229
- Home runs: 24
- Runs batted in: 99
- Stats at Baseball Reference

Teams
- Cincinnati Reds (1982–1985); Texas Rangers (1985); St. Louis Cardinals (1988)

Duane Allen Walker (born March 13, 1957) is an American former Major League Baseball outfielder. He played for five seasons at the major league level for the Cincinnati Reds, Texas Rangers, and St. Louis Cardinals. He was drafted by the Reds in the 1st round (22nd pick) of the secondary phase of the 1976 amateur draft. Walker played his first professional season with their Class A Short Season Eugene Emeralds in 1976, and split his last season between St. Louis and their Triple-A club, the Louisville Redbirds, in 1988.

Walker was selected as the Most Valuable Player (MVP) of the 1979 Southern League All-Star Game in which he hit an RBI single, drew a walk, stole two bases, and completed a double play from third base.
