= Memphis Chicks (Southern League) =

- 1978–1997; Memphis, Tennessee

Minor league affiliations
- Class: Double-A (1978–1997)
- League: Southern League (1978–1997)

Major league affiliations
- Team: Seattle Mariners (1997); San Diego Padres (1995–1996); Kansas City Royals (1984–1994); Montreal Expos (1978–1983)

Minor league titles
- League titles (1): 1990
- Division titles (2): 1980; 1990
- First-half titles (6): 1979; 1980; 1981; 1990; 1995; 1996
- Second-half titles (1): 1988

Team data
- Name: Memphis Chicks (1978–1997)
- Colors: Dark blue, black, white
- Ballpark: Tim McCarver Stadium (1978–1997)

The Memphis Chicks were a Minor League Baseball team that played in the Southern League from 1978 to 1997. They were located in Memphis, Tennessee, and played their home games at Tim McCarver Stadium. They served as a farm club for four Major League Baseball teams: the Montreal Expos (1978–1983), Kansas City Royals (1984–1994), San Diego Padres (1995–1996), and Seattle Mariners (1997). The Chicks were named for the Memphis Chickasaws, who were charter members of the Southern Association that played in Memphis from 1901 to 1960.

Over the course of their 20-year run, the Chicks played in 2,858 regular season games and compiled a win–loss record of 1,419–1,439. Memphis reached the postseason on seven occasions, winning seven half-season titles, two division titles, and one Southern League championship. They won their lone league title in 1990 as an affiliate of the Kansas City Royals. The team had an overall postseason record of 15–21.

== History ==
=== Prior professional baseball in Memphis ===
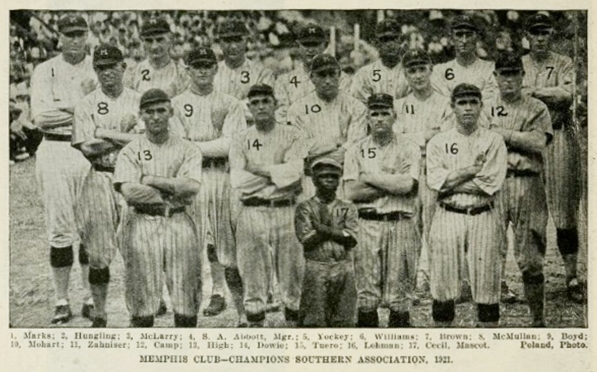
The first Memphis Chicks played in the Southern Association from 1901 to 1960.

The first professional baseball team in Memphis was the Memphis Reds of the League Alliance in 1877. A different Reds team was created as a charter member of the original Southern League in 1885. The city's Southern League team was known as the Grays in 1886 and 1888, the Browns in 1887, simply Memphis in 1889, the Giants in 1892 and 1894, the Fever Germs in 1893, and the Lambs/Giants in 1895.

The city's longest-operating baseball team, first known as Memphis Egyptians, was formed in 1901 as a charter member of the Southern Association. From 1909 to 1911, this club was called the Turtles before receiving its best-known moniker, the Chickasaws, often shortened to Chicks, in 1912. The original Chicks remained in the league through 1960, winning eight pennants, one playoff championship, and one Dixie Series title. Russwood Park, their home ballpark, was destroyed by fire in April 1960. With the cost of building a new facility too high, the team dropped out of the league after the 1960 season.

After a seven-year span with no professional team, Memphis became host to the Memphis Blues, a Double-A team of the Texas League, in 1968. The team played at Blues Stadium, a converted American Legion field which opened in 1963 and was located at the former Mid-South Fairgrounds. After six seasons, the Blues moved up to the Triple-A International League in 1974, but the franchise was revoked by the league due to financial problems after the 1976 season.

=== Montreal Expos (1978–1983) ===
In 1978, a new Memphis Chicks team was created as an expansion franchise of the Double-A Southern League playing in its Western Division as an affiliate of the Montreal Expos. The Expos moved their Double-A affiliation from the Québec Metros in Quebec City to Memphis because of the circuit's better climate. The Chicks played their home games at Blues Stadium, which was renamed Tim McCarver Stadium in honor of Tim McCarver, a Memphis native, former Chickasaw, and major league ballplayer.

The Chicks played their first game on April 15, 1978, at home against the Nashville Sounds, who also joined the league as an expansion team. After going up 1–0 in the first inning, Nashville tied the game in the third and went ahead, 2–1, in the top of the sixth. In the bottom of the inning, however, Memphis answered with three unearned runs, sealing their first win, 4–2. On August 20, Mike Finlayson pitched a seven-inning no-hitter in the first game of a doubleheader against the Montgomery Rebels in Memphis. The Southern League used a split-season schedule wherein the season was divided into two halves, and the division winners from each half qualified for the postseason championship playoffs. Memphis placed second in both halves and finished their inaugural season with a record of 71–73. Outfielder Eddie Gates was selected as the Southern League Most Valuable Player (MVP).

Memphis ended the first half of the 1979 season tied for first place with Montgomery. They won the First Half Western Division title by defeating the Rebels, 2–1, in a one-game playoff. They lost the best-of-three Western Division championship series to Nashville, the second half winner, two games to one. The Chicks won the first half again in 1980, this time defeating the Sounds, 3–1, to advance to the finals, but they lost to the Charlotte O's, 3–1.

On July 6, 1981, the Chicks played host to the Southern League All-Star Game at Tim McCarver Stadium. The game was originally scheduled to be played in Savannah, Georgia, against the Atlanta Braves, but was changed to Memphis against the Chicks due to the 1981 Major League Baseball strike. Before an attendance of 5,366 people, a team of the Southern League's All-Stars defeated Memphis, 10–3. The 1981 Chicks won a third consecutive first half title, but were swept by Nashville in the Western Division series, 3–0. The teams fielded in 1982 and 1983 failed to win either half of the season and finished with under-.500 records. Through six years of affiliation with the Montreal Expos, Memphis accumulated a 444–421 record.

=== Kansas City Royals (1984–1994) ===
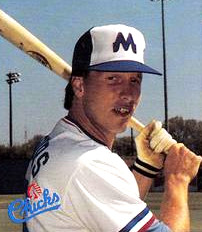
Matt Winters won the 1988 Southern League MVP Award.

In 1983, team owner Avron Fogelman, purchased a 49 percent interest in the Kansas City Royals. Majority owner Ewing Kauffman then chose to move Kansas City's Double-A affiliation to Memphis for 1984.

On July 2, 1986, Mitch McKelvey no-hit the Columbus Astros in a 16–0 Memphis win at Tim McCarver Stadium. The Chicks struggled through their first four years in the Royals system, not posting their first winning record until 1987. Prior to the 1988 season, Fogelman sold the team to Craig Stein, who also owned the Double-A Reading Phillies of the Eastern League, for an undisclosed price. Memphis won the second half title in 1988, but lost the division championship to the Chattanooga Lookouts, 3–1. Outfielder Matt Winters was selected as the 1988 Southern League MVP. The team experienced a franchise-low 59–84 (.413) record in 1989. Left fielder Harvey Pulliam was voted the MVP of the 1989 Southern League All-Star Game. After the season, the team changed hands again as Stein sold the franchise to businessmen Mike Nicklous, Richard Addeo, and Alan Bernikow for over $3 million. It was Nicklous' intention to purchase and relocate a Triple-A team to Memphis.

The Chicks rebounded in 1990, by winning the first half of the season and beating the Birmingham Barons, 3–1, to win the Western Division title. In the best-of-five finals, Memphis won their only Southern League championship by defeating the Orlando Sun Rays, 3–2. First baseman Jeff Conine was voted the 1990 Southern League MVP. On July 12, 1993, Memphis hosted the Double-A All-Star Game. A team of National League-affiliated All-Stars defeated a team of American League affiliates, 12–7, with 6,335 people in attendance. Chicks right fielder Les Norman was selected as the game's Southern League MVP. During the All-Star break, team president David Hersh announced that NBC broadcaster Bob Costas had joined the Chicks' ownership group, Professional Sports Entertainment of Tennessee, Inc, which consisted of other limited partners including film director Ron Howard, television talk show host Maury Povich, former major league catcher and baseball broadcaster Tim McCarver, and United States House of Representatives member Steve Cohen. On August 8, Rodney Myers pitched a no-hitter against the Knoxville Smokies in a 3–0 Memphis win. The final four years of the Kansas City affiliation were reminiscent of the first four with only one winning season in their final year of partnership in 1994. Over the 11-year affiliation, the longest in franchise history, Memphis had a 759–814 record. Through all 17 years of play, the team was 1,203–1,235.

=== San Diego Padres (1995–1996) ===
Memphis entered into a two-year affiliation with the San Diego Padres for 1995 and 1996. First baseman Jason Thompson was the Southern League MVP of the 1995 Double-A All-Star Game. On September 2, Robbie Beckett no-hit the Chattanooga Lookouts in the second game of a seven-inning doubleheader, which Memphis lost, 1–0. The Chicks won the first-half title in 1995, but lost the Western Division finals to Chattanooga, 3–2. The Chicks repeated as first-half champions in 1996, but were again ousted by the Lookouts, 3–1. The team's 81–58 (.583) record was the highest in franchise history. First baseman Derrek Lee won the 1996 MVP Award. In two seasons with the Padres, the Chicks' record was 149–132. The held a composite franchise record of 1,352–1,367.

=== Seattle Mariners (1997) ===
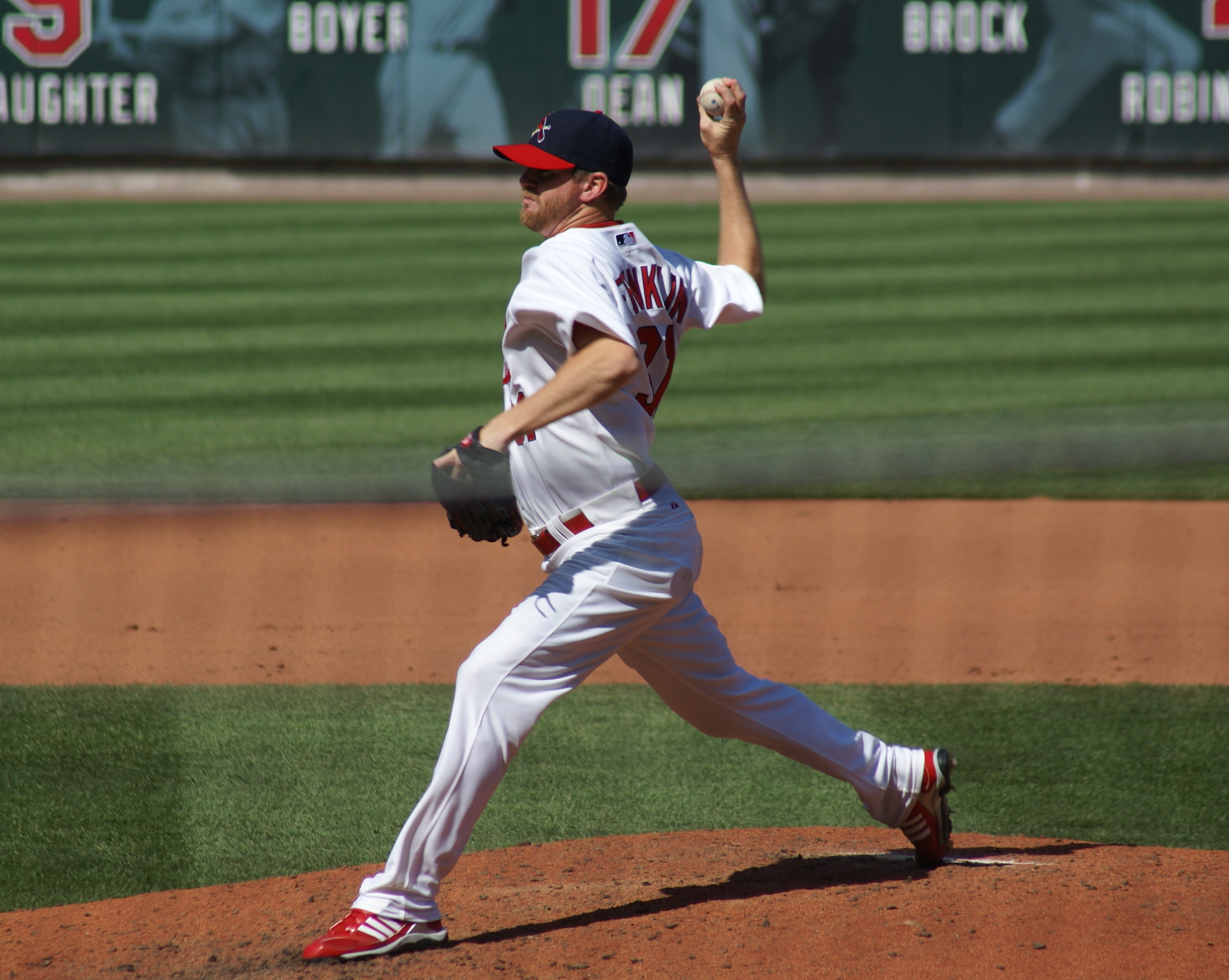
Ryan Franklin pitched two no-hitters for the Chicks in 1997.

The Chicks entered into a one-year agreement to partner with the Seattle Mariners in 1997 while plans were underway to relocate the team. Memphis' pitchers tossed two no-hitters in their final season. The first occurred on April 14 when Ryan Franklin, Scott Simmons, and David Holdridge combined to no-hit the Lookouts in a 4–0 win. One week later, in his next start on April 21, Franklin pitched a solo seven-inning no-hit game on the road against the Carolina Mudcats in the first game of a doubleheader, a 6–0 win. On September 1, the Chicks played their final game on the road at Chattanooga's Engel Stadium, a 3–0 Memphis win. In their final season, the Chicks compiled a 67–72 record and missed out on winning either half of the season. Over their 20-year run in Memphis, the team had a composite record of 1,419–1,439.

With the 1998 arrival of the Memphis Redbirds, a Triple-A Pacific Coast League expansion team, the Southern League Chicks franchise moved to Jackson and became the West Tenn Diamond Jaxx in 1998. From 2021 to 2024, the Redbirds honored the Chicks' history by designating Thursday home games as "Retro Nights", where the team played in 1970s-style Chicks pullover jerseys, former players were celebrated, and certain concessions could be purchased at "vintage" prices.

== Season-by-season results ==
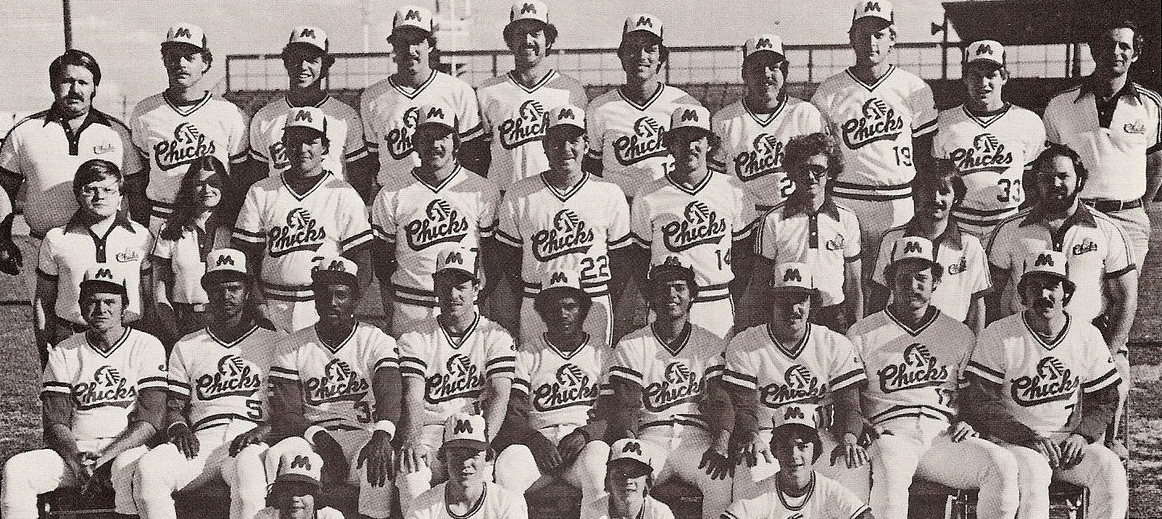
The 1979 Chicks finished with a 82–62 (.569) record playing as the Double-A affiliate of the Montreal Expos in the Southern League.

The Chicks' best regular-season record occurred in 1996 when they finished 81–58 (.583). Their lowest season record was 59–84 (.413), which they recorded in 1989. Of the four Major League Baseball teams with which Memphis was affiliated, they experienced their best record as the Double-A farm club of the San Diego Padres from 1995 to 1996. In the two-year affiliation, the Chicks compiled a win–loss record of 149–132 (.530). They reached the postseason in both years, going 3–6 (.333), but failed to win a Southern League championship. Conversely, Memphis incurred a 67–72 (.482) record in their single season with the Seattle Mariners and did not reach the postseason. Over their complete 20-year run, the Chicks won two division titles (1980 and 1990) and one Southern League championship (1990).

== Achievements ==
=== Award winners ===
Six people associated with the Chicks, four players and two executives, won Southern League year-end awards.

Award	Recipient	Season	Ref.
Most Valuable Player	Eddie Gates	1978	
Most Valuable Player	Matt Winters	1988	
Most Valuable Player	Jeff Conine	1990	
Most Valuable Player	Derrek Lee	1996	
Executive of the Year	Art Clarkson	1979	
Executive of the Year	Allie Prescott	1981	

=== All-Star Game MVPs ===
Three players won Most Valuable Player (MVP) Awards for their contributions in an All-Star Game.

Award	Player	Position	Ref.
1989 Southern League All-Star Game MVP	Harvey Pulliam	Left fielder	
1993 Double-A All-Star Game MVP	Les Norman	Right fielder	
1995 Double-A All-Star Game MVP	Jason Thompson	First baseman	

=== Postseason All-Stars ===
Of the 27 Chicks who were selected for the Southern League Postseason All-Star Team, only Phil Hiatt (1992 and 1994), Bryan Little (1991 at two positions), Dan Rohrmeier (1996 at two positions), and Matt Winters (1987 and 1988) were selected twice.

Season	Player	Position	Ref.
1978	Ray Crowley	Designated hitter	
1978	Eddie Gates	Outfielder	
1979	Dave Hostetler	Designated hitter	
1979	Tim Raines	Second baseman	
1980	Pat Rooney	Outfielder	
1981	Tom Gorman	Left-handed pitcher	
1981	Bryan Little	Shortstop	
1981	Bryan Little	Best hustler	
1982	Mike Fuentes	Outfielder	
1983	Rene Gonzales	Utility	
1983	Razor Shines	Best hustler	
1984	Bill Pecota	Third baseman	
1986	Gary Thurman	Outfielder	
1987	Matt Winters	Outfielder	
1988	Matt Winters	Designated hitter	
1989	Bob Hamelin	Designated hitter	
1989	Harvey Pulliam	Outfielder	
1990	Sean Berry	Third baseman	
1990	Jeff Conine	First baseman	
1990	Brian McRae	Outfielder	
1990	Bobby Moore	Outfielder	
1991	Kevin Koslofski	Outfielder	
1992	Phil Hiatt	Third baseman	
1993	Les Norman	Outfielder	
1993	Joe Randa	Third baseman	
1994	Phil Hiatt	Outfielder	
1996	Derrek Lee	First baseman	
1996	Heath Murray	Left-handed pitcher	
1996	Dan Rohrmeier	Outfielder	
1996	Dan Rohrmeier	Designated hitter	
1997	Ken Cloude	Right-handed pitcher	

=== Hall of Famers ===
Four people associated with the Chicks, three players and one manager, were inducted in the Southern League Hall of Fame.

Year	Name	Position	Chicks career	Ref.
2015	Razor Shines	First baseman	1981–1983	
2016	Bo Jackson	Outfielder	1986	
2018	Terry Francona	Outfielder	1980–1981	
2019	Sal Rende	Manager	1988	

== Managers ==
The Chicks were led by 16 managers over 20 years of competition in 2,858 regular-season games in which they compiled a win–loss record of 2,858–1,419 (.497). Their teams qualified for the postseason on seven occasions and had a postseason record of 15–21 (.417). Manager Jeff Cox won 193 games from 1989 to 1991, placing him first for all-time wins; having managed the team for 431 games over three seasons, he was also the longest-tenured manager in team history. Cox's .448 winning percentage, however, was the lowest over a full season or more by a Chicks manager. The manager with the highest winning percentage over a full season or more was Ed Romero (1996), with .583.

== See also ==
- Sports in Memphis, Tennessee
