= Southern League All-Star Game =

- Frequency: Annual
- Location: Varies (see prose)
- Inaugurated: July 13, 1964 (Rickwood Field, Birmingham, Alabama, United States)
- Most recent: June 18, 2019 (MGM Park, Biloxi, Mississippi, United States)
- Previous event: June 19, 2018 (Regions Field, Birmingham, Alabama, United States)
- Participants: Southern League minor league baseball players
- Organizer: Southern League
- Website: Official website

The Southern League All-Star Game was an annual baseball game sanctioned by Minor League Baseball between professional players from the teams of the Double-A Southern League. Each division, North and South, fielded a team composed of players in their respective divisions as voted on by the managers, general managers, and broadcasters from each of the league's eight clubs.

From the first All-Star Game in 1964 through 1998, the event predominantly consisted of a single team of the league's All-Stars versus a Major League Baseball team. The division versus division format was used from 1999 to 2019. No game was held from 1991 to 1995 as the Southern League and the other two Double-A leagues, the Eastern League and Texas League, participated in the Double-A All-Star Game instead.

Traditionally, the game took place during the three-day All-Star break between the first and second halves of the season. The game was meant to mark the halfway-point in the season with the first 70 games being played before and the remaining 70 after. Some additional events, such as the Home Run Derby and All-Star Fan Fest occurred each year during this break in the regular season.

== History ==
The first Southern League All-Star Game was played in 1964 at Rickwood Field in Birmingham, Alabama. In the inaugural game, held in the league's first season of operation, the hosting Birmingham Barons served as the competition for a team of Southern League All-Stars as they held first place at a predetermined point in the season. Through 1998, the game usually pitted an All-Star team versus a Major League Baseball (MLB) team, sometimes the host's major league affiliate. The Atlanta Braves participated in 12 All-Star Games, the most among MLB teams. The Minnesota Twins, Houston Astros, Toronto Blue Jays, Chicago Cubs, and Seattle Mariners also competed in one game each.

Other arrangements were also utilized. On seven occasions, a Southern League team, usually the league's leader at a given point before the game, was selected to compete against the All-Stars. These were the Birmingham Barons, Columbus Confederate Yankees, Mobile A's, Montgomery Rebels, Memphis Chicks, Nashville Sounds, and Mobile BayBears. In such instances, players from the rival team who were voted onto All-Star teams played for their own clubs, or the league prohibited voting for players on the host team and chose to recognize all players on those teams as All-Stars. Triple-A teams twice served as the All-Stars' opponents: in 1986 against Nashville, which had moved to the American Association, and in 1987 versus the International League's Richmond Braves. In 1990, one team was made up of All-Stars from American League affiliates and the other of National League affiliates.

A division versus division format, where each division fields a team composed of players in their respective divisions, was used intermittently—first in 1975 and again in 1984 and 1988. This format was readopted in 1999 and has been utilized each year since. From 1999 to 2004, it was East against West. Since realignment in 2005, it has been North versus South.

No game was held from 1991 to 1995 as the Southern League and the other two Double-A leagues, the Eastern League and Texas League, participated in the Double-A All-Star Game instead. The Southern League continued to participate in the Double-A All-Star Game through its final contention in 2002 but resumed holding its own All-Star Game in 1996.

The 2019 All-Star Game in Biloxi, Mississippi, became the final one to be held. The 2020 event planned to occur in Jackson, Tennessee, was cancelled along with the entire season due to the COVID-19 pandemic. Prior to the 2021 season, Major League Baseball assumed control of Minor League Baseball and the Southern League ceased operations.

== Structure ==
In the final 2019 All-Star Game, each division's roster consisted of 25 players, as voted on by the managers, general managers, and broadcasters from each of the league's eight clubs. The actual number of players on gameday may have been less due to call-ups, injuries, or players choosing not to participate. Nonparticipants retained their All-Star status. The game itself consisted of a single nine-inning game to determine a champion. The division in which the host city competes was considered the home team for the game and the other team was designated the visiting team. Designated hitters batted in place of the pitchers.

Historically, players wore their respective team's uniforms. Typically, players on the home team wore their club's white home uniforms, while players on the away team wore their club's gray road uniforms. This changed in 2019 when players wore division-specific jerseys paired with the appropriate home/road pants and their respective team's cap.

== Results ==
Date	Winning team	Score	Losing team	City	Ballpark	Host team	Attendance	Ref(s).
July 13, 1964	Birmingham Barons	7–2	Southern League	Birmingham, Alabama	Rickwood Field	Birmingham Barons	7,264	
July 19, 1965	Columbus Confederate Yankees	4–3	Southern League	Columbus, Georgia	Golden Park	Columbus Confederate Yankees	4,091	
August 8, 1966	Mobile A's	6–1	Southern League	Mobile, Alabama	Hartwell Field	Mobile A's	3,406	
June 26, 1967	Southern League	5–0	Atlanta Braves	Charlotte, North Carolina	Calvin Griffith Park	Charlotte Hornets	6,554	
June 24, 1968	Southern League; Atlanta Braves	— (Note: The game was cancelled due to rain.)	—	Savannah, Georgia	Grayson Stadium	Savannah Senators	—	
July 19, 1969	Southern League	7–1 (5 inn.) (Note: The game was called due to a loss of power from high winds in the top of the sixth inning.)	Atlanta Braves	Birmingham, Alabama	Rickwood Field	Birmingham A's	13,905	
August 17, 1970	Atlanta Braves	3–1	Southern League	Birmingham, Alabama	Rickwood Field	Birmingham A's	6,615	
July 8, 1971	Atlanta Braves	5–3	Southern League	Jacksonville, Florida	Wolfson Park	Jacksonville Suns	6,412	
July 14, 1972	Southern League	7–6	Montgomery Rebels	Montgomery, Alabama	Paterson Field	Montgomery Rebels	2,586	
June 14, 1973	Southern League; Atlanta Braves	2–2 (5 inn.) (Note: The game was called due to rain after five innings.)	—	Savannah, Georgia	Grayson Stadium	Savannah Braves	6,000	
August 13, 1974 (Note: The game was originally scheduled for June 27 at Birmingham but was rescheduled for August 13 at Jacksonville to accommodate the Minnesota Twins.)	Southern League	3–1	Minnesota Twins	Jacksonville, Florida	Wolfson Park	Jacksonville Suns	2,423	
July 24, 1975	East Division	3–1	West Division	Savannah, Georgia	Grayson Stadium	Savannah Braves	2,800	
May 27, 1976	Atlanta Braves	6–1	Southern League	Charlotte, North Carolina	Calvin Griffith Park	Charlotte O's	4,207	
July 7, 1977	Southern League	6–4	Atlanta Braves	Chattanooga, Tennessee	Engel Stadium	Chattanooga Lookouts	8,000	
July 13, 1978	Atlanta Braves	5–1	Southern League	Savannah, Georgia	Grayson Stadium	Savannah Braves	5,283	
July 12, 1979	Southern League	5–2	Atlanta Braves	Nashville, Tennessee	Herschel Greer Stadium	Nashville Sounds	11,079	
June 23, 1980	Southern League; Atlanta Braves	— (Note: The game was cancelled due to rain.)	—	Jacksonville, Florida	Wolfson Park	Jacksonville Suns	—	
July 6, 1981	Southern League	10–3	Memphis Chicks (Note: The game was originally scheduled to be played in Savannah against the Atlanta Braves, but was changed to Memphis against the Chicks due to the 1981 Major League Baseball strike.)	Memphis, Tennessee	Tim McCarver Stadium	Memphis Chicks	5,366	
July 22, 1982	Southern League	7–4	Atlanta Braves	Birmingham, Alabama	Rickwood Field	Birmingham Barons	11,111	
June 19, 1983	Southern League	3–2	Nashville Sounds	Nashville, Tennessee	Herschel Greer Stadium	Nashville Sounds	1,221	
June 21, 1984	West Division	2–1	East Division	Greenville, South Carolina	Greenville Municipal Stadium	Greenville Braves	3,493	
June 6, 1985	Houston Astros	3–0	Southern League	Birmingham, Alabama	Rickwood Field	Birmingham Barons	2,157	
July 23, 1986	Nashville Sounds	4–2	Southern League	Huntsville, Alabama	Joe W. Davis Stadium	Huntsville Stars	4,181	
July 13, 1987	Southern League; Richmond Braves	3–3 (10 inn.) (Note: The game was called after 10 innings due to a lack of available pitchers on the All-Star Team.)	—	Greenville, South Carolina	Greenville Municipal Stadium	Greenville Braves	2,919	
July 13, 1988	East Division	6–5 (10 inn.)	West Division	Jacksonville, Florida	Wolfson Park	Jacksonville Suns	2,122	
June 1, 1989	Southern League	5–3	Toronto Blue Jays	Knoxville, Tennessee	Bill Meyer Stadium	Knoxville Blue Jays	—	
July 11, 1990	National League	3–2	American League	Chattanooga, Tennessee	Engel Stadium	Chattanooga Lookouts	5,918	
1991	No game held in lieu of the Double-A All-Star Game							
1992	No game held in lieu of the Double-A All-Star Game							
1993	No game held in lieu of the Double-A All-Star Game							
1994	No game held in lieu of the Double-A All-Star Game							
1995	No game held in lieu of the Double-A All-Star Game							
May 30, 1996	Chicago Cubs	8–0	Southern League	Orlando, Florida	Tinker Field	Orlando Cubs	5,292	
July 21, 1997	Southern League	9–5	Seattle Mariners	Zebulon, North Carolina	Five County Stadium	Carolina Mudcats	8,123	
June 22, 1998	Southern League	6–4	Mobile BayBears	Mobile, Alabama	Hank Aaron Stadium	Mobile BayBears	5,453	
June 23, 1999	West Division	5–2	East Division	Jackson, Tennessee	Pringles Park	West Tenn Diamond Jaxx	4,169	
June 20, 2000	West Division	6–3	East Division	Greenville, South Carolina	Greenville Municipal Stadium	Greenville Braves	6,532	
June 20, 2001	West Division	4–3 (10 inn.)	East Division	Kodak, Tennessee	Smokies Stadium	Tennessee Smokies	5,086	
June 19, 2002	West Division	4–1	East Division	Kodak, Tennessee	Smokies Stadium	Tennessee Smokies	—	
July 8, 2003	East Division	7–5	West Division	Jacksonville, Florida	Baseball Grounds of Jacksonville	Jacksonville Suns	7,552	
July 13, 2004	East Division	10–6	West Division	Chattanooga, Tennessee	BellSouth Park	Chattanooga Lookouts	5,857	
July 13, 2005	North Division	12–5	South Division	Mobile, Alabama	Hank Aaron Stadium	Mobile BayBears	—	
July 10, 2006	North Division	9–4	South Division	Montgomery, Alabama	Montgomery Riverwalk Stadium	Montgomery Biscuits	7,454	
July 9, 2007	North Division	7–4	South Division	Pearl, Mississippi	Trustmark Park	Mississippi Braves	4,555	
July 14, 2008	North Division	6–1	South Division	Zebulon, North Carolina	Five County Stadium	Carolina Mudcats	5,667	
July 13, 2009	North Division	7–0	South Division	Birmingham, Alabama	Rickwood Field	Birmingham Barons	7,127	
July 12, 2010	North Division	3–2	South Division	Huntsville, Alabama	Joe W. Davis Stadium	Huntsville Stars	7,782	
June 21, 2011	North Division	6–3	South Division	Jackson, Tennessee	Pringles Park	Jackson Generals	5,516	
June 19, 2012	South Division	6–2	North Division	Kodak, Tennessee	Smokies Stadium	Tennessee Smokies	5,406	
July 17, 2013	South Division	6–0	North Division	Jacksonville, Florida	Baseball Grounds of Jacksonville	Jacksonville Suns	9,373	
June 24, 2014	South Division	6–4	North Division	Chattanooga, Tennessee	AT&T Field	Chattanooga Lookouts	4,487	
June 23, 2015	North Division	9–0	South Division	Montgomery, Alabama	Montgomery Riverwalk Stadium	Montgomery Biscuits	5,891	
June 21, 2016	South Division	5–1	North Division	Pearl, Mississippi	Trustmark Park	Mississippi Braves	4,172	
June 20, 2017	North Division; South Division	— (Note: The game was cancelled due to rain.)	—	Pensacola, Florida	Admiral Fetterman Field	Pensacola Blue Wahoos	—	
June 19, 2018	South Division	9–5	North Division	Birmingham, Alabama	Regions Field	Birmingham Barons	8,500	
June 18, 2019	North Division	7–3	South Division	Biloxi, Mississippi	MGM Park	Biloxi Shuckers	4,209	
June 30, 2020	Cancelled due to the COVID-19 pandemic (Note: The game was cancelled on May 18 due to COVID-19 pandemic.)			Jackson, Tennessee	The Ballpark at Jackson	Jackson Generals	—	

== Most Valuable Player Award ==
The Most Valuable Player (MVP) Award was bestowed on the player with the best performance at each All-Star Game. No award was given in the first eight games (1964–1971) or in 1973's rain-shortened game, but it was awarded continuously 1974 to 2019. Eight players from the Birmingham Barons were selected for the MVP Award, more than any other team in the league. The Jacksonville Expos/Suns had the second-most with five MVPs. Seven players from the Chicago White Sox organization won the MVP Award, the most of any Major League Baseball organization. They are followed by the Detroit Tigers with five MVPs and the Atlanta Braves and Florida Marlins with four winners each. The only player to win the MVP Award more than once is Birmingham's Jeff Inglin, who won back-to-back in 1999 and 2000.

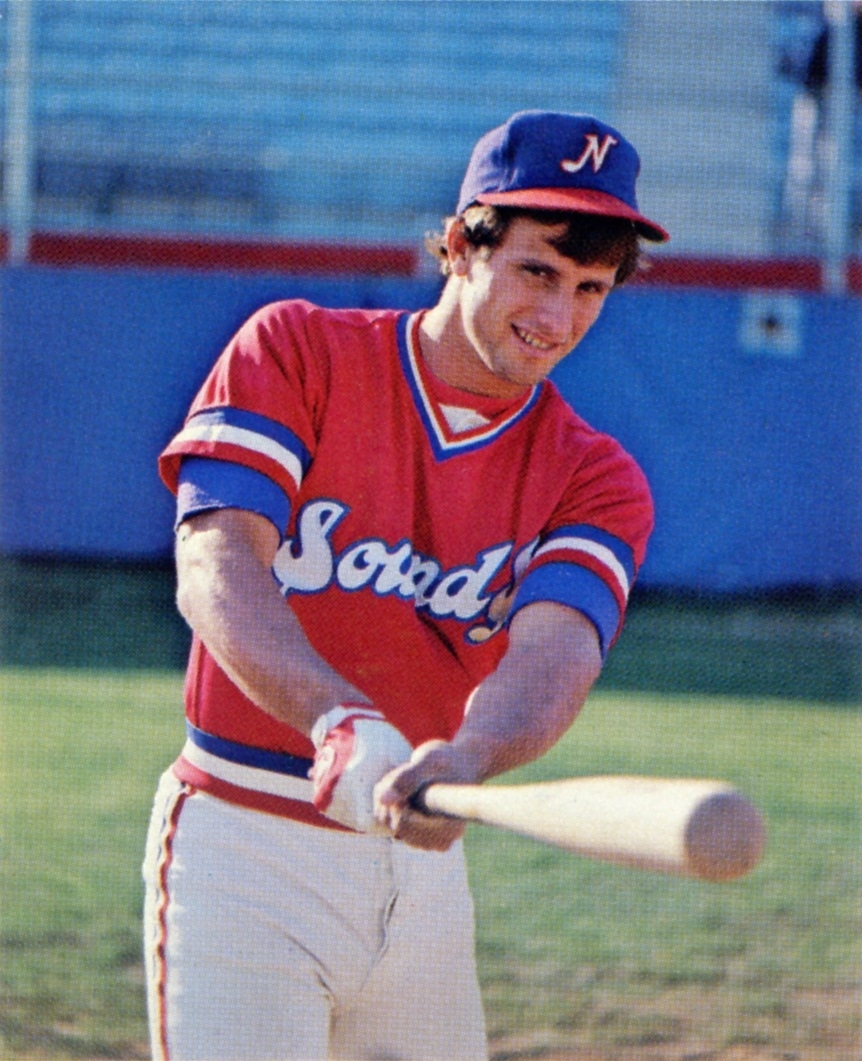
Duane Walker, 1979 MVP

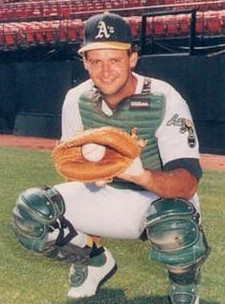
Terry Steinbach, 1986 MVP

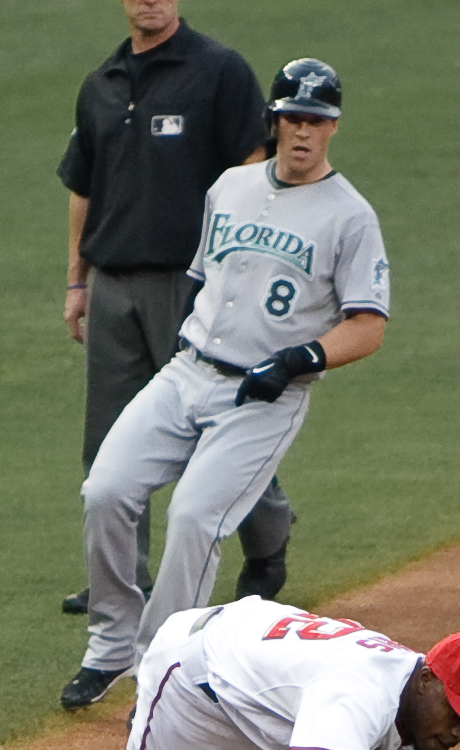
Chris Coghlan, 2008 MVP

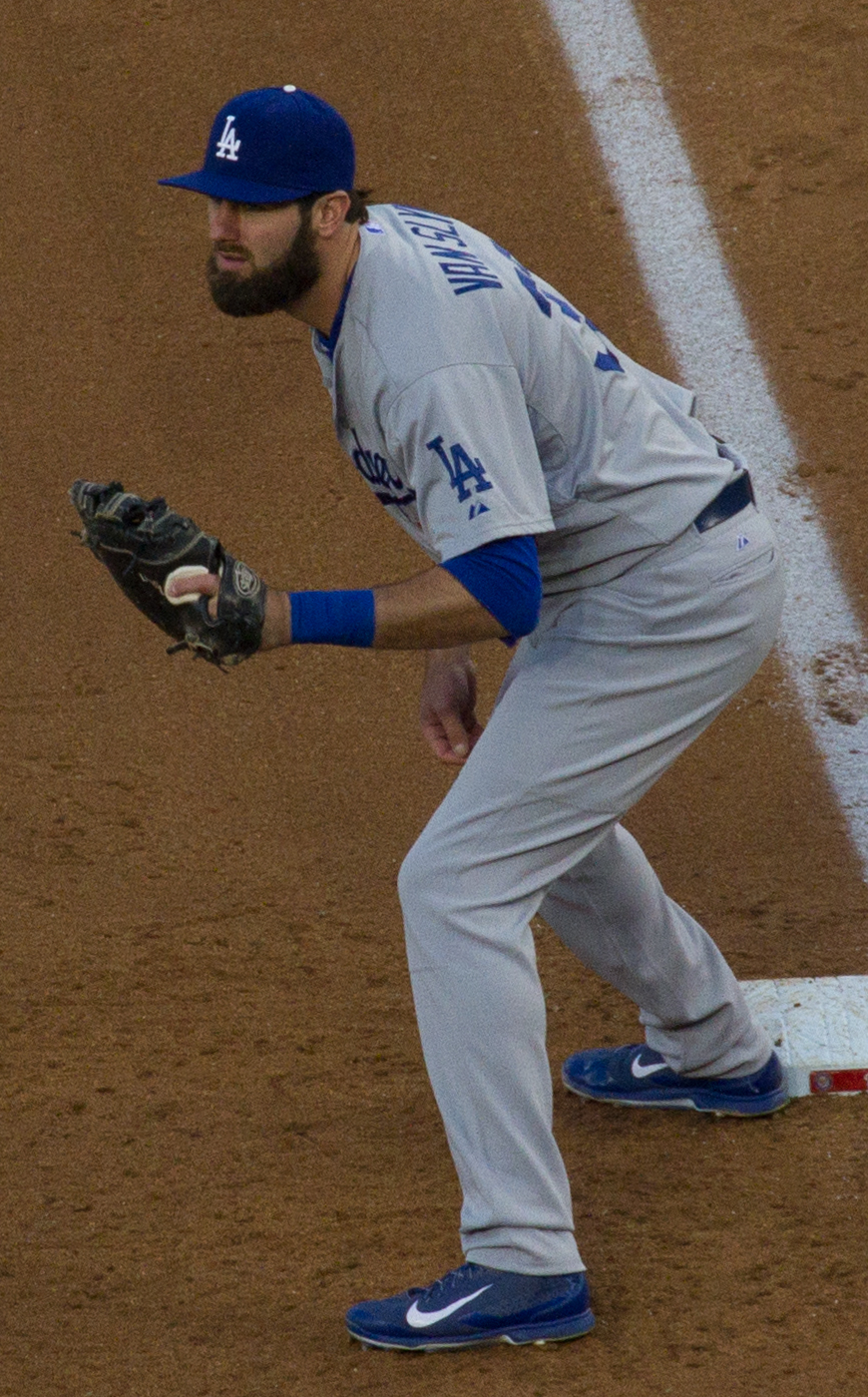
Scott Van Slyke, 2011 MVP

Most Valuable Player Award Recipients
Year	MVP	Team	Organization	Position	Ref.
1964	None selected				
1965	None selected				
1966	None selected				
1967	None selected				
1968	None selected				
1969	None selected				
1970	None selected				
1971	None selected				
1972	Bucky Dent	Knoxville Sox	Chicago White Sox	Shortstop	
1973	None selected				
1974	Freddie Velázquez	Savannah Braves	Atlanta Braves	Designated hitter	
1975	Roger Cador	Savannah Braves	Atlanta Braves	Left fielder	
1976	Charles Smith	Orlando Twins	Minnesota Twins	Relief pitcher	
1977	Lou Whitaker	Montgomery Rebels	Detroit Tigers	Second baseman	
1978	Roger Alexander	Savannah Braves	Atlanta Braves	Starting pitcher	
1979	Duane Walker	Nashville Sounds	Cincinnati Reds	Center fielder	
1981	Jeff Kenaga	Birmingham Barons	Detroit Tigers	Right fielder	
1982	Jeff Reynolds	Knoxville Blue Jays	Toronto Blue Jays	Third baseman	
1983	George Foussianes	Birmingham Barons	Detroit Tigers	Third baseman	
1984	Jack McKnight	Knoxville Blue Jays	Toronto Blue Jays	Starting pitcher	
1985	Robbie Wine	Columbus Astros	Houston Astros	Catcher	
1986	Terry Steinbach	Huntsville Stars	Oakland Athletics	Catcher	
1987	Ron Gant	Greenville Braves	Atlanta Braves	Second baseman	
1988	Randy Braun	Jacksonville Expos	Montreal Expos	Left fielder	
1989	Harvey Pulliam	Memphis Chicks	Kansas City Royals	Left fielder	
1990	Andy Mota	Columbus Mudcats	Houston Astros	Second baseman	
1996	Geremi González	Orlando Cubs	Chicago Cubs	Starting pitcher	
1997	Juan Encarnación	Jacksonville Suns	Detroit Tigers	Right fielder	
1998	Gabe Kapler	Jacksonville Suns	Detroit Tigers	Right fielder/designated hitter	
1999	Jeff Inglin	Birmingham Barons	Chicago White Sox	Left fielder	
2000	Jeff Inglin	Birmingham Barons	Chicago White Sox	Left fielder	
2001	Joe Borchard	Birmingham Barons	Chicago White Sox	Center fielder	
2002	Alex Fernandez	Birmingham Barons	Chicago White Sox	Outfielder	
2003	Víctor Díaz	Jacksonville Suns	Los Angeles Dodgers	Second baseman	
2004	Jesse Gutierrez	Chattanooga Lookouts	Cincinnati Reds	First baseman	
2005	Jeremy Hermida	Carolina Mudcats	Florida Marlins	Right fielder	
2006	Scott Moore	West Tenn Diamond Jaxx	Chicago Cubs	Third baseman	
2007	Lee Mitchell	Carolina Mudcats	Florida Marlins	Third baseman	
2008	Chris Coghlan	Carolina Mudcats	Florida Marlins	Second baseman	
2009	Josh Bell	Chattanooga Lookouts	Los Angeles Dodgers	Third baseman	
2010	Matt Dominguez	Jacksonville Suns	Florida Marlins	Third baseman	
2011	Scott Van Slyke	Chattanooga Lookouts	Los Angeles Dodgers	First baseman	
2012	Alfredo Marte	Mobile BayBears	Arizona Diamondbacks	Right fielder	
2013	Justin Greene	Mobile BayBears	Arizona Diamondbacks	Left fielder	
2014	Taylor Motter	Montgomery Biscuits	Tampa Bay Rays	Right fielder	
2015	Tim Anderson	Birmingham Barons	Chicago White Sox	Shortstop	
2016	Phillip Ervin	Pensacola Blue Wahoos	Cincinnati Reds	Outfielder	
2018	Zach Gibbons	Mobile BayBears	Los Angeles Angels	Left fielder	
2019	Luis Robert	Birmingham Barons	Chicago White Sox	Center fielder	
