= Matt Winters =

American baseball player (born 1960)

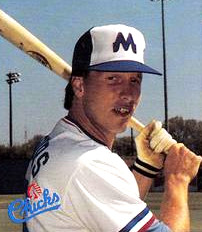
- Winters in 1988 with the Memphis Chicks
- Right fielder
- Born: March 18, 1960 (age 65); Buffalo, New York, U.S.
- Batted: Left Threw: Right

Professional debut
- MLB: May 30, 1989, for the Kansas City Royals
- NPB: April 7, 1990, for the Nippon Ham Fighters

Last appearance
- MLB: October 1, 1989, for the Kansas City Royals
- NPB: October 4, 1994, for the Nippon Ham Fighters

MLB statistics
- Batting average: .234
- Home runs: 2
- Runs batted in: 9

NPB statistics
- Batting average: .267
- Home runs: 160
- Runs batted in: 428
- Stats at Baseball Reference

Teams
- Kansas City Royals (1989); Nippon Ham Fighters (1990–1994)

Matthew Littleton Winters (born March 18, 1960) is a former professional baseball player from Buffalo, New York. He played part of one season in Major League Baseball with the Kansas City Royals, and four seasons with the Nippon Ham Fighters in Nippon Professional Baseball.

== Career ==
Winters was drafted by the New York Yankees in the first round of the 1978 amateur draft, and spent most of his career in the minor leagues. He was released by the Yankees in 1985, and signed with the Chicago White Sox, before being returned to the Yankees in a trade for cash and several minor league players. He signed with the Kansas City Royals in 1987, and made his major league debut in 1989 with the Royals. He played in 42 games in 1989 before being released at the end of the season.

He signed with the Fighters in the Japanese Pacific League in 1990 and quickly emerged as the team's best power hitter, hitting over 30 home runs each of his first four seasons in Japan. He recorded the second most home runs in the league for three consecutive years, behind Orestes Destrade. He also attracted attention from fans for his avid personality; he frequently participated in between-inning dance performances, and performed magic tricks whenever a game was stopped due to rain. His antics and clutch hitting made him one of the most popular players in the league. He dropped to 22 home runs in 1994, and announced his retirement during the off-season.

In 1995, he was a replacement player in spring training for the Florida Marlins during the ongoing strike.

He worked as a scout and coach in the minor leagues before becoming a scout for the Fighters.
