= Tommy Jones (baseball) =

American baseball player, coach, and manager

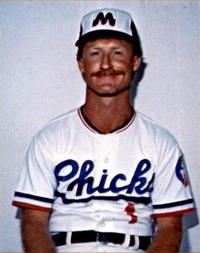
- Jones with the Memphis Chicks in 1986
- Utility player / Manager / First base coach
- Born: October 13, 1954; Stockton, California, US
- Died: January 15, 2009 (aged 54); Phoenix, Arizona, US
- Batted: Right Threw: Right
- Stats at Baseball Reference

Teams
- as Coach: Arizona Diamondbacks (2004)

Thomas Michael Jones (October 13, 1954 – January 15, 2009) was an American professional baseball player who later served as a coach for the Arizona Diamondbacks of Major League Baseball (MLB) in 2004. He was also a manager in Minor League Baseball for 13 seasons. As a player, Jones was listed at 6 feet 1 inch (1.85 m) and 185 pounds (84 kg); he batted and threw right-handed.

== Biography ==
Jones was born in Stockton, California, and played college baseball for the Pacific Tigers baseball team.

Jones played in minor league baseball from 1976 through 1981. His first five seasons were spent in Class A and Class A Short Season leagues. In his final season, he played in Triple-A for the Phoenix Giants of the Pacific Coast League (PCL). Overall, Jones appeared in 223 games in six seasons, batting .258 with eight home runs and 92 RBIs. He made 125 appearances as an outfielder, while also making appearances at every infield position.

Jones then was a manager in the minor leagues from 1982 through 1993, and again in 1997. He worked for multiple franchises: the Kansas City Royals, New York Yankees, Seattle Mariners, Milwaukee Brewers, and Chicago Cubs. Jones managed Bo Jackson in 1986, when both were with the Memphis Chicks of the Southern League. Jones managed at the Triple-A level for one season, with the Calgary Cannons of the PCL in 1990. His final season as a manager was spent with the Lethbridge Black Diamonds in Alberta, Canada, an early farm team of the Arizona Diamondbacks, who entered MLB in 1998. In 13 seasons as a manager, his teams accrued a record of 760–768, for a .497 winning percentage. Jones gained Manager of the Year honors during the 1982, 1983, and 1992 seasons.

Jones held several positions with the Diamondbacks; he was director of field operations in 1996 and 1997, and player development director from 1998 to 2004. He served as first base coach for the 2004 Diamondbacks, from early July through the end of the season. In 2005, he was a scout for the Mariners. He later worked as director of baseball operations for the Arizona Fall League during the 2008 season.

Jones died of brain cancer at his Phoenix home at the age of 54. He was survived by a son and a daughter.
