= Rod Myers =

American baseball player (born 1973)

- Outfielder
- Born: January 14, 1973 (age 53); Conroe, Texas, U.S.
- Batted: Left Threw: Left

MLB debut
- June 21, 1996, for the Kansas City Royals

Last MLB appearance
- September 28, 1997, for the Kansas City Royals

MLB statistics
- Batting average: .268
- Home runs: 3
- Runs batted in: 20
- Stats at Baseball Reference

Teams
- Kansas City Royals (1996–1997)

Roderick Demond Myers (born January 14, 1973) is an American former professional outfielder. He played in parts of two seasons in the Major League Baseball (MLB), 1996 and 1997, for the Kansas City Royals. He currently owns KC Elite Athletics consulting and training.

== Sources ==
- Career statistics from Baseball Reference · Baseball Reference (Minors) · Retrosheet · Baseball Almanac
