= Jason Thompson (first baseman, born 1971) =

American baseball player

- First baseman
- Born: June 13, 1971 (age 55); Orlando, Florida
- Batted: Left Threw: Left

MLB debut
- June 9, 1996, for the San Diego Padres

Last MLB appearance
- June 22, 1996, for the San Diego Padres

MLB statistics
- Batting average: .224
- Home runs: 2
- Runs batted in: 6

NPB statistics
- Batting average: .247
- Home runs: 14
- Runs batted in: 62
- Stats at Baseball Reference

Teams
- San Diego Padres (1996); Chiba Lotte Marines (1997)

Jason Michael Thompson (born June 13, 1971) is an American former professional baseball player who played first base in Major League Baseball and Nippon Professional Baseball.

Thompson attended Laguna Hills High School in Laguna Hills, California, the University of Southern California (USC), Saddleback College, Pepperdine University and the University of Arizona. He was not a starter on his high school's baseball team until his senior year and did not receive any attention from college recruiters. After high school, he enrolled at USC and failed at an attempt to walk onto the USC Trojans baseball team. He transferred to Saddleback College after his former high school coach was named head coach of Saddleback's baseball team. He was drafted by the San Diego Padres in the ninth round of the 1993 Major League Baseball draft.

Thompson demonstrated decent power while in the Padres' farm system, clubbing 21 home runs and driving in 109 runs in 1994. However, he also proved himself to be something of a defensive liability. He committed twelve errors at first in 1993 with the Spokane Indians, and committed nineteen in 1994 with the Rancho Cucamonga Quakes and the Wichita Wranglers. He spent 1995 with the Memphis Chicks, and had 20 home runs and 64 RBIs.

He earned a call up to the majors in June 1996, and made his major league debut on June 9 against the Pittsburgh Pirates. After going 0-for-7 with two strikeouts and committing a game losing error in a sixteen inning game against the Chicago Cubs (his second error of the game), he was demoted to the triple A Las Vegas Stars. He would only play in thirteen major league games, batting .224 with two home runs and six runs batted in while committing six errors. After sitting out the entire 1997 season, he returned to the Las Vegas Stars in 1998.
