= Rick Mathews =

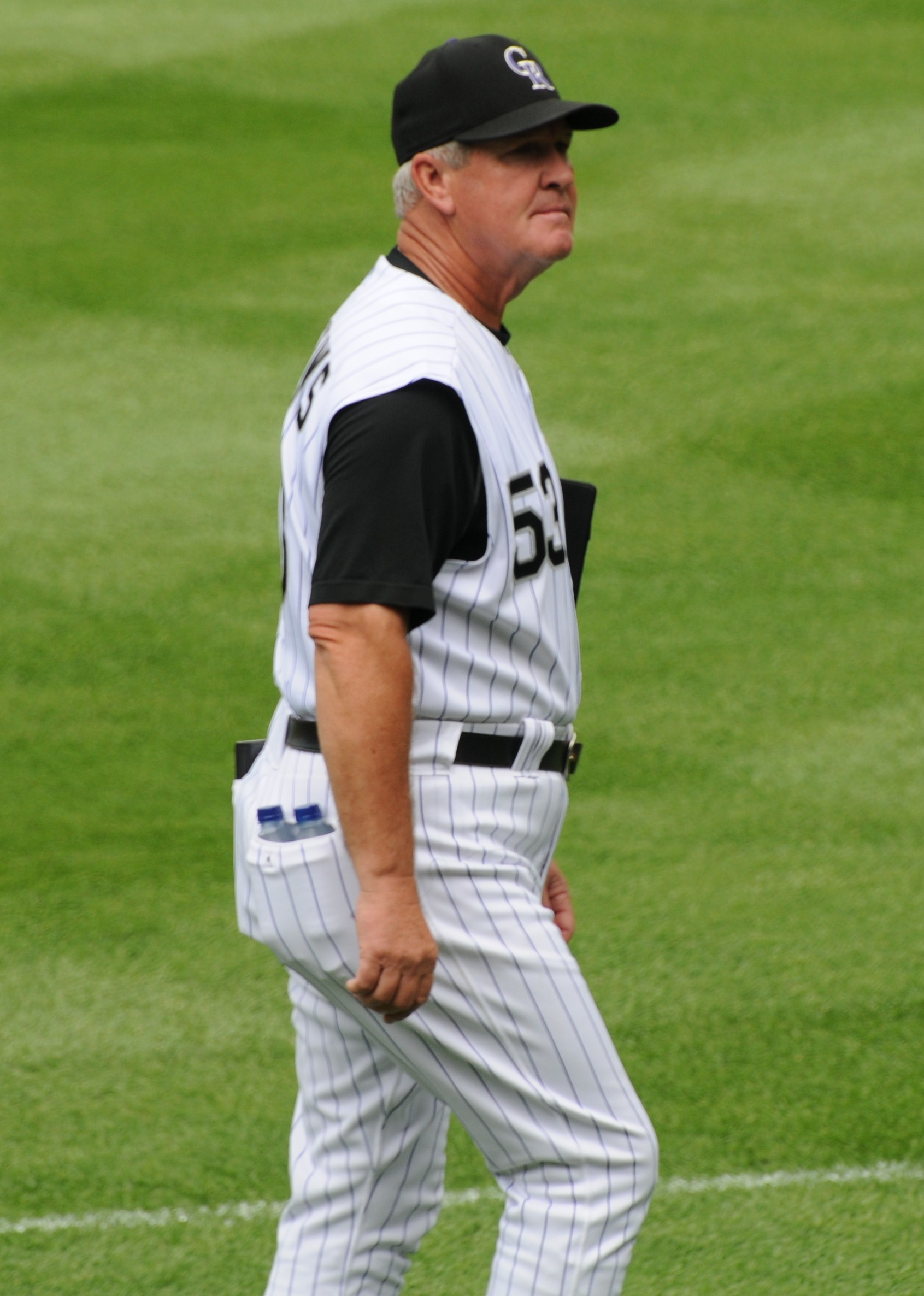
- Peterson with the New York Mets during spring training in 2007
- Coach
- Born: 1947 (age 77–78); Centerville, Iowa, U.S.
- Bats: Right Throws: Right

Teams
- Colorado Rockies (1993, 1995, 2003–2008)

Rick Ray Mathews (born 1947) is an American professional baseball scout and former bullpen coach for the Colorado Rockies of Major League Baseball (MLB).

== Education and early career ==
In 1969, Mathews graduated from Drake University, where he was a pitcher on the Drake baseball team. He was a high school and junior college baseball coach, as well as a part-time scout for the Kansas City Royals (1971–74) and Philadelphia Phillies (1974–77). Notable members of the high school team he coached in Cincinnati Iowa include Michael Baughman. He then became a minor league manager in the Kansas City organization, with posts in Charleston (1981), Ft. Myers (1982–83), Memphis (1984) and Eugene (1987). He also was Kansas City's Assistant Director of Player Development (1985–86). From 1988 to 1990, Mathews was the Royals' traveling minor league instructor.

Mathews joined the Rockies in the summer of 1992 as the pitching coach at Mesa of the Arizona Rookie League. He was then slated to work at Bend the following season but coached in the big league bullpen for most of the year. He was Colorado's bullpen coach for a large portion of the inaugural season of 1993 and then again in 1995. He then spent seven years as Colorado's roving minor league pitching coordinator before his third stint on the Rockies' Major League staff.

== Current career ==
Mathews is currently a pro scout for the Rockies based in Centerville, Iowa. During a ceremony at city hall on Friday morning, November 9, 2007, Mayor Greg Fenton proclaimed “Rick Mathews Day” in Centerville.
