= Brian Bevil =

American baseball player (born 1971)

- Pitcher
- Born: September 5, 1971 (age 53); Houston, Texas, U.S.
- Batted: Right Threw: Right

MLB debut
- June 17, 1996, for the Kansas City Royals

Last MLB appearance
- September 26, 1998, for the Kansas City Royals

MLB statistics
- Win–loss record: 5–3
- Earned run average: 6.28
- Strikeouts: 67
- Stats at Baseball Reference

Teams
- Kansas City Royals (1996–1998)

Brian Scott Bevil (born September 5, 1971) is a former Major League Baseball pitcher who played for three seasons. He pitched for the Kansas City Royals in 60 career games.
