= Jeff Cox =

American baseball player and coach (born 1955)

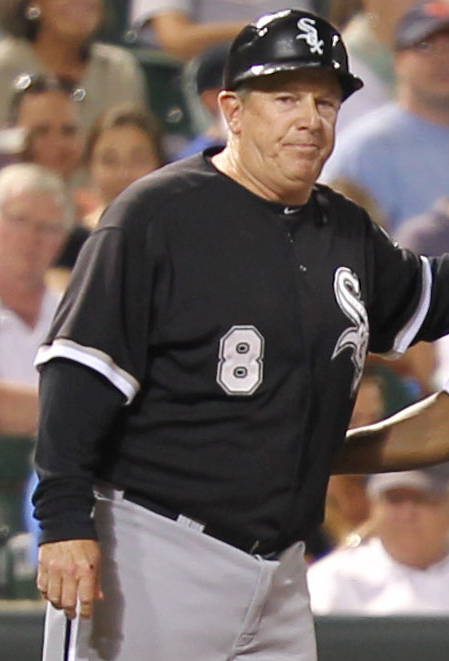
- Cox in 2011
- Second baseman
- Born: November 9, 1955 (age 70); Los Angeles, California, U.S.
- Batted: Right Threw: Right

MLB debut
- July 1, 1980, for the Oakland Athletics

Last MLB appearance
- September 16, 1981, for the Oakland Athletics

MLB statistics
- Batting average: .213
- Hits: 36
- Runs batted in: 9
- Stats at Baseball Reference

Teams
- As player: Oakland Athletics (1980–1981); As coach: Kansas City Royals (1995); Montreal Expos (2000–2001); Florida Marlins (2002–2005); Pittsburgh Pirates (2006–2007); Chicago White Sox (2008–2011)

Career highlights and awards
- World Series champion (2003)

Jeffrey Lindon Cox (born November 9, 1955) is a former Major League Baseball third base coach for the Chicago White Sox. He is currently a baserunning specialist for the Detroit Tigers. Previously, Cox was a second baseman for the Oakland Athletics during the 1980 and 1981 seasons. He batted and threw right-handed.

== Coaching career ==
=== Montreal Expos ===
On July 20, 2000, Cox, who was at the time serving as the manager of the Triple-A Ottawa Lynx, was promoted to serve as the bench coach of the Montreal Expos. He was later retained for the 2001 season.

=== Florida Marlins ===
On February 12, 2002, Cox was hired by the Florida Marlins to serve as their bullpen coach. He served as the bench coach, bullpen coach, and as the third base coach during his four years with the Marlins. In 2003, Cox earned a World Series ring when the Marlins defeated the New York Yankees in the 2003 World Series. He was let go by the Marlins after the 2005 season.

=== Pittsburgh Pirates ===
On December 1, 2005, Cox was named the third base coach and infield instructor for the Pittsburgh Pirates.

=== Chicago White Sox ===
On October 26, 2007, Cox left the Pirates and was hired by the Chicago White Sox to become the team's third base coach. His contract was not renewed following the 2011 season.

=== Detroit Tigers ===
On January 17, 2013, the Detroit Tigers hired Cox as a baserunning consultant.

== Playing career ==
In a 61-game career, Cox was a .213 hitter (36-for-169) with 20 runs, 9 RBI and no home runs.

== Personal ==
Cox is a single father and has one daughter named Kimberly. He graduated in 1973 from South Hills High School located in West Covina, California. In high school, Cox was a three-sport athlete lettering in baseball, basketball, and cross-country. His senior year in high school he was named to the California Interscholastic Federation first team in baseball and basketball. Cox later attended Manatee Junior College in Bradenton, Florida while also playing at the Royals Baseball Academy. Cox played two years of basketball at Mount San Antonio College in Walnut, California and also attended Cal Poly-Pomona.
