= Les Norman (baseball) =

American baseball player (born 1969)

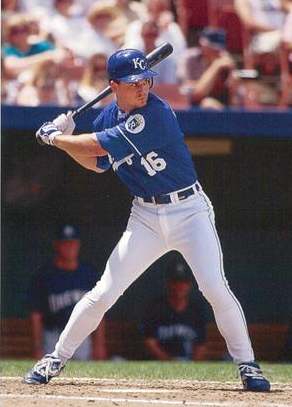
- Outfielder
- Born: February 25, 1969 (age 57); Warren, Michigan, U.S.
- Batted: Right Threw: Right

MLB debut
- May 29, 1995, for the Kansas City Royals

Last MLB appearance
- September 29, 1996, for the Kansas City Royals

MLB statistics
- Batting average: .169
- Hits: 15
- Runs: 15
- Stats at Baseball Reference

Teams
- Kansas City Royals (1995–1996)

Leslie Eugene Norman (born February 25, 1969) is an American former Major League Baseball outfielder who played for two seasons. He played in 24 games for the Kansas City Royals during the 1995 Kansas City Royals season and 54 games during the 1996 Kansas City Royals season.

Norman appeared as a contestant on Wheel of Fortune on January 5, 2018.
