= Harvey Pulliam =

American baseball player (born 1967)

- Outfielder
- Born: October 20, 1967 (age 57); San Francisco, California, U.S.
- Batted: Right Threw: Right

Professional debut
- MLB: August 10, 1991, for the Kansas City Royals
- NPB: April 4, 1998, for the Orix BlueWave

Last appearance
- MLB: September 28, 1997, for the Colorado Rockies
- NPB: September 29, 1999, for the Orix BlueWave

MLB statistics
- Batting average: .262
- Home runs: 8
- Runs batted in: 22

NPB statistics
- Batting average: .282
- Home runs: 38
- Runs batted in: 147

KBO statistics
- Batting average: .267
- Home runs: 16
- Runs batted in: 55
- Stats at Baseball Reference

Teams
- Kansas City Royals (1991–1993); Colorado Rockies (1995–1997); Orix BlueWave (1998–1999); SK Wyverns (2000)

Harvey Jerome Pulliam (born October 20, 1967) is an American former outfielder in Major League Baseball for the Kansas City Royals (1991-1993) and Colorado Rockies (1995-1997). He also played two seasons in Japan for the Orix BlueWave (1998-1999)

In 1989, Pulliam, was the Southern League's all-star game MVP.

In 2008, Harvey coached a little league team in Contra Costa County, California.

In six seasons covering 123 games, Pulliam batted .262 (49-for-187) with 8 home runs and 22 RBI.
