= 1997 Boston Red Sox season =

Major League Baseball season

1997 Boston Red Sox
- League: American League
- Division: East
- Ballpark: Fenway Park
- City: Boston, Massachusetts
- Record: 78–84 (.481)
- Divisional place: 4th
- Owners: JRY Trust
- President: John Harrington
- General manager: Dan Duquette
- Manager: Jimy Williams
- Television: WABU (Sean McDonough, Jerry Remy); NESN (Bob Kurtz, Jerry Remy)
- Radio: WEEI (Jerry Trupiano, Joe Castiglione); WROL (Bobby Serrano, Hector Martinez)
- Stats: ESPN.com; Baseball Reference

The 1997 Boston Red Sox season was the 97th season in the franchise's Major League Baseball history. The Red Sox finished fourth in the American League East with a record of 78 wins and 84 losses, 20 games behind the Baltimore Orioles. It was the last time the Red Sox had a losing record until 2012. The Red Sox had 5,781 at bats, a single-season major league record. They also hit 373 doubles, which tied a single-season major league record set by the St. Louis Cardinals in 1930, which they later tied during their World Series championship curse-breaking season in 2004 and later surpassed by the Texas Rangers in 2008 with 376.

== Offseason ==
- December 9, 1996: Bret Saberhagen was signed as a free agent with the Boston Red Sox.
- January 22, 1997: Steve Avery was signed as a free agent with the Boston Red Sox.
- January 27, 1997: José Canseco was traded by the Boston Red Sox to the Oakland Athletics for John Wasdin and cash.
- January 31, 1997: Mike Benjamin was signed as a free agent with the Boston Red Sox.

Prior to the season, three large Coca-Cola bottles were placed on the left light tower of the Green Monster as an advertisement (they were removed prior to the 2008 season).

== Regular season ==
=== Season standings ===
AL East
| Team | W | L | Pct. | GB | Home | Road |
|---|---|---|---|---|---|---|
| Baltimore Orioles | 98 | 64 | .605 | — | 46‍–‍35 | 52‍–‍29 |
| New York Yankees | 96 | 66 | .593 | 2 | 47‍–‍33 | 49‍–‍33 |
| Detroit Tigers | 79 | 83 | .488 | 19 | 42‍–‍39 | 37‍–‍44 |
| Boston Red Sox | 78 | 84 | .481 | 20 | 39‍–‍42 | 39‍–‍42 |
| Toronto Blue Jays | 76 | 86 | .469 | 22 | 42‍–‍39 | 34‍–‍47 |

=== Record vs. opponents ===
1997 American League record Source: MLB Standings Grid – 1997
| Team | ANA | BAL | BOS | CWS | CLE | DET | KC | MIL | MIN | NYY | OAK | SEA | TEX | TOR | NL |
|---|---|---|---|---|---|---|---|---|---|---|---|---|---|---|---|
| Anaheim | — | 4–7 | 6–5 | 6–5 | 7–4 | 5–6 | 6–5 | 7–4 | 4–7 | 4–7 | 11–1 | 6–6 | 8–4 | 6–5 | 4–12 |
| Baltimore | 7–4 | — | 5–7 | 5–6 | 6–5 | 6–6 | 7–4 | 5–6 | 10–1 | 8–4 | 8–3 | 7–4 | 10–1 | 6–6 | 8–7 |
| Boston | 5–6 | 7–5 | — | 3–8 | 6–5 | 5–7 | 3–8 | 8–3 | 8–3 | 4–8 | 7–4 | 7–4 | 3–8 | 6–6 | 6–9 |
| Chicago | 5–6 | 6–5 | 8–3 | — | 5–7 | 4–7 | 11–1 | 4–7 | 6–6 | 2–9 | 8–3 | 5–6 | 3–8 | 5–6 | 8–7 |
| Cleveland | 4–7 | 5–6 | 5–6 | 7–5 | — | 6–5 | 8–3 | 8–4 | 8–4 | 5–6 | 7–4 | 3–8 | 5–6 | 6–5 | 9–6 |
| Detroit | 6–5 | 6–6 | 7–5 | 7–4 | 5–6 | — | 6–5 | 4–7 | 4–7 | 2–10 | 7–4 | 4–7 | 7–4 | 6–6 | 8–7 |
| Kansas City | 5–6 | 4–7 | 8–3 | 1–11 | 3–8 | 5–6 | — | 6–6 | 7–5 | 3–8 | 3–8 | 5–6 | 6–5 | 5–6 | 6–9 |
| Milwaukee | 4–7 | 6–5 | 3–8 | 7–4 | 4–8 | 7–4 | 6–6 | — | 5–7 | 4–7 | 5–6 | 5–6 | 7–4 | 7–4 | 8–7 |
| Minnesota | 7–4 | 1–10 | 3–8 | 6–6 | 4–8 | 7–4 | 5–7 | 7–5 | — | 3–8 | 7–4 | 5–6 | 3–8 | 3–8 | 7–8 |
| New York | 7–4 | 4–8 | 8–4 | 9–2 | 6–5 | 10–2 | 8–3 | 7–4 | 8–3 | — | 6–5 | 4–7 | 7–4 | 7–5 | 5–10 |
| Oakland | 1–11 | 3–8 | 4–7 | 3–8 | 4–7 | 4–7 | 8–3 | 6–5 | 4–7 | 5–6 | — | 5–7 | 5–7 | 6–5 | 7–9 |
| Seattle | 6–6 | 4–7 | 4–7 | 6–5 | 8–3 | 7–4 | 6–5 | 6–5 | 6–5 | 7–4 | 7–5 | — | 8–4 | 8–3 | 7–9 |
| Texas | 4–8 | 1–10 | 8–3 | 8–3 | 6–5 | 4–7 | 5–6 | 4–7 | 8–3 | 4–7 | 7–5 | 4–8 | — | 4–7 | 10–6 |
| Toronto | 5–6 | 6–6 | 6–6 | 6–5 | 5–6 | 6–6 | 6–5 | 4–7 | 8–3 | 5–7 | 5–6 | 3–8 | 7–4 | — | 4–11 |

Red Sox vs. National League East
| Team | ATL | FLA | MON | NYM | PHI |
|---|---|---|---|---|---|
| Boston | 0–3 | 1–2 | 0–3 | 2–1 | 3–0 |

=== Notable Transactions ===
- July 31, 1997: Heathcliff Slocumb was traded by the Boston Red Sox to the Seattle Mariners for Derek Lowe and Jason Varitek.
- August 30, 1997: Curtis Pride was signed as a free agent with the Boston Red Sox.

=== Opening Day lineup ===
| 5 | Nomar Garciaparra | SS |
| 13 | John Valentin | 2B |
| 42 | Mo Vaughn | 1B |
| 20 | Mike Stanley | DH |
| 11 | Tim Naehring | 3B |
| 12 | Wil Cordero | LF |
| 44 | Rudy Pemberton | RF |
| 37 | Bill Haselman | C |
| 24 | Shane Mack | CF |
| 36 | Tom Gordon | P |

=== Roster ===
1997 Boston Red Sox
Roster
| Pitchers: 33 Steve Avery; 47 Toby Borland; 50 Mark Brandenburg; 40 Robinson Checo; 41 Jim Corsi; 52 Vaughn Eshelman; 34 Rich Garcés; 36 Tom Gordon; 59 Ken Grundt; 32 Chris Hammond; 27 Butch Henry; 54 Joe Hudson; 53 Kerry Lacy; 43 Derek Lowe; 57 Ron Mahay; 59 Pat Mahomes; 19 Brian Rose; 17 Bret Saberhagen; 26 Aaron Sele; 51 Heathcliff Slocumb; 55 Jeff Suppan; 43 Ricky Trlicek; 49 Tim Wakefield; 46 John Wasdin | Catchers: 37 Bill Haselman; 10 Scott Hatteberg; 45 Walt McKeel; 47 Jason Varitek; Infielders: 28 Mike Benjamin; 3 Jeff Frye; 5 Nomar Garciaparra; 18 Reggie Jefferson; 11 Tim Naehring; 29 Arquimedez Pozo; 20 Mike Stanley; 13 John Valentin; 42 Mo Vaughn | Outfielders: 56 Darren Bragg; 44 Michael Coleman; 12 Wil Cordero; 15,24 Shane Mack; 38 José Malavé; 25 Troy O'Leary; 44 Rudy Pemberton; 30 Jesús Tavárez; Other batters: 2 Curtis Pride | Manager: 22 Jimy Williams; Coaches: 48 Dave Jauss (First base); 16 Joe Kerrigan (Pitching); 31 Wendell Kim (Third base); 60 Dana LeVangie (Bullpen catcher); 35 Grady Little (Bench); 14 Jim Rice (Hitting); 23 Herm Starrette (Bullpen) |

=== Wally the Green Monster ===
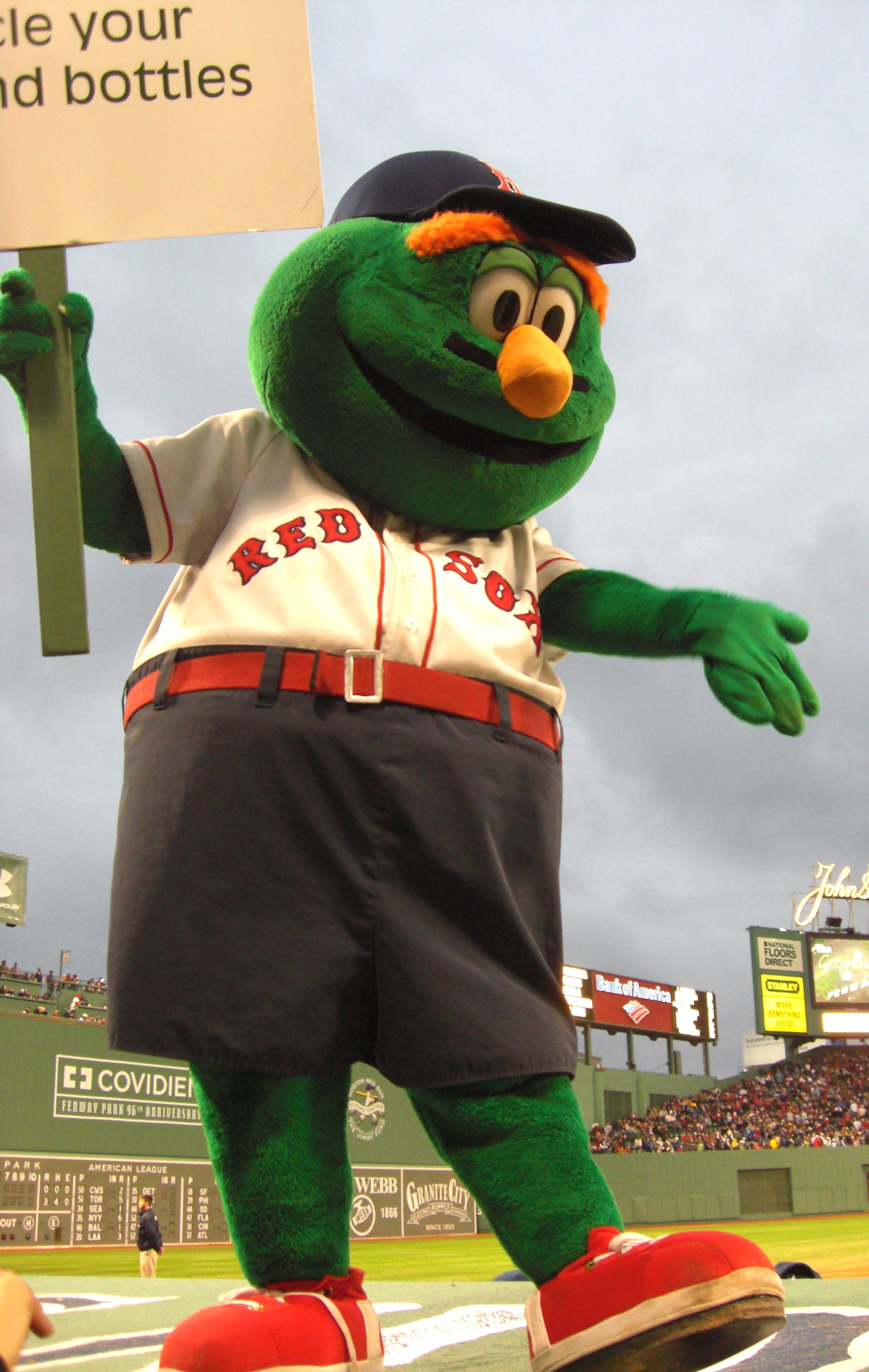
Wally the Green Monster

Wally the Green Monster is the official mascot for the Boston Red Sox. His name is derived from the Green Monster nickname of the 37-foot wall in left field at Fenway Park. Wally debuted in 1997 to the chagrin of many older Red Sox fans. Although he was a hit with children, the older fans did not immediately adopt him as part of the franchise. According to the Red Sox promotions department, Wally was a huge Red Sox fan who decided to move inside the left field wall of Fenway Park since it "eats up" hits that would easily be home runs at other parks in 1947. Apparently, he was very shy and lived the life of a hermit for 50 years. On the 50th anniversary of the Green Monster in 1997, he came out of the manual scoreboard and has been interacting with players and fans ever since. Thanks to former Red Sox second baseman and broadcaster Jerry Remy, those older fans have adored him.

== Player stats ==
=== Batting ===
==== Starters by position ====
Note: Position; G = Games played; AB = At bats; H = Hits; Avg. = Batting average; HR = Home runs; RBI = Runs batted in; SB = Stolen bases

| Pos | Player | G | AB | H | Avg. | HR | RBI | SB |
|---|---|---|---|---|---|---|---|---|
| C | Scott Hatteberg | 114 | 350 | 97 | .277 | 10 | 44 | 0 |
| 1B | Mo Vaughn | 141 | 527 | 166 | .315 | 35 | 96 | 2 |
| 2B | John Valentin | 143 | 575 | 176 | .306 | 18 | 77 | 7 |
| SS | Nomar Garciaparra | 153 | 684 | 209 | .306 | 30 | 98 | 22 |
| 3B | Tim Naehring | 70 | 259 | 74 | .286 | 9 | 40 | 1 |
| LF | Wil Cordero | 140 | 570 | 160 | .281 | 18 | 72 | 1 |
| CF | Darren Bragg | 153 | 513 | 132 | .257 | 9 | 57 | 10 |
| RF | Troy O'Leary | 146 | 499 | 154 | .309 | 15 | 80 | 0 |
| DH | Reggie Jefferson | 136 | 489 | 156 | .319 | 13 | 67 | 1 |

==== Other batters ====
Note: G = Games played; AB = At bats; H = Hits; Avg. = Batting average; HR = Home runs; RBI = Runs batted in; SB = Stolen bases

| Player | G | AB | H | Avg. | HR | RBI | SB |
|---|---|---|---|---|---|---|---|
| Jeff Frye | 127 | 404 | 126 | .312 | 3 | 51 | 19 |
| Mike Stanley | 97 | 260 | 78 | .300 | 13 | 53 | 0 |
| Bill Haselman | 67 | 212 | 50 | .236 | 6 | 26 | 0 |
| Shane Mack | 60 | 130 | 41 | .315 | 3 | 17 | 2 |
| Mike Benjamin | 49 | 116 | 27 | .233 | 0 | 7 | 2 |
| Jesus Tavarez | 42 | 69 | 12 | .174 | 0 | 7 | 0 |
| Rudy Pemberton | 27 | 63 | 15 | .238 | 2 | 10 | 0 |
| Michael Coleman | 8 | 24 | 4 | .167 | 0 | 2 | 1 |
| Arquimedez Pozo | 4 | 15 | 4 | .267 | 0 | 3 | 0 |
| Jose Malave | 4 | 4 | 0 | .000 | 0 | 0 | 0 |
| Walt McKeel | 5 | 3 | 0 | .000 | 0 | 0 | 0 |
| Curtis Pride | 2 | 2 | 1 | .500 | 1 | 1 | 0 |
| Jason Varitek | 1 | 1 | 1 | 1.000 | 0 | 0 | 0 |

=== Pitching ===
Note: G = Games pitched; GS = Games started; IP = Innings pitched; W = Wins; L = Losses; SV = Saves; ERA = Earned run average; SO = Strikeouts

==== Starting pitchers ====
| Player | G | GS | IP | W | L | SV | ERA | SO |
|---|---|---|---|---|---|---|---|---|
| Tim Wakefield | 35 | 29 | 201.1 | 12 | 15 | 0 | 4.25 | 151 |
| Tom Gordon | 42 | 25 | 182.2 | 6 | 10 | 11 | 3.74 | 159 |
| Aaron Sele | 33 | 33 | 177.1 | 13 | 12 | 0 | 5.38 | 122 |
| Jeff Suppan | 23 | 22 | 112.1 | 7 | 3 | 0 | 5.69 | 67 |
| Steve Avery | 22 | 18 | 96.2 | 6 | 7 | 0 | 6.42 | 51 |

==== Main relief pitchers ====
Note: G = Games pitched; GS = Games started; IP = Innings pitched; W = Wins; L = Losses; SV = Saves; ERA = Earned run average; SO = Strikeouts

| Player | G | GS | IP | W | L | SV | ERA | SO |
|---|---|---|---|---|---|---|---|---|
| Heathcliff Slocumb | 49 | 0 | 46.2 | 0 | 5 | 17 | 5.79 | 36 |
| John Wasdin | 53 | 7 | 124.2 | 4 | 6 | 0 | 4.40 | 84 |
| Butch Henry | 36 | 5 | 84.1 | 7 | 3 | 6 | 3.52 | 51 |
| Jim Corsi | 52 | 0 | 57.2 | 5 | 3 | 2 | 3.43 | 40 |
| Kerry Lacy | 33 | 0 | 45.2 | 1 | 1 | 3 | 6.11 | 18 |

==== Other pitchers and secondary relief pitchers ====
Note: G = Games pitched; GS = Games started; IP = Innings pitched; W = Wins; L = Losses; SV = Saves; ERA = Earned run average; SO = Strikeouts

| Player | G | GS | IP | W | L | SV | ERA | SO |
|---|---|---|---|---|---|---|---|---|
| Chris Hammond | 29 | 8 | 65.1 | 3 | 4 | 1 | 5.92 | 48 |
| Vaughn Eshelman | 21 | 6 | 42.2 | 3 | 3 | 0 | 6.33 | 18 |
| Mark Brandenburg | 31 | 0 | 41.0 | 0 | 2 | 0 | 5.49 | 34 |
| Joe Hudson | 26 | 0 | 35.2 | 3 | 1 | 0 | 3.53 | 14 |
| Bret Saberhagen | 6 | 6 | 26.0 | 0 | 1 | 0 | 6.58 | 14 |
| Ron Mahay | 28 | 0 | 25.0 | 3 | 0 | 0 | 2.52 | 22 |
| Ricky Trlicek | 18 | 0 | 23.1 | 3 | 4 | 0 | 4.63 | 10 |
| Derek Lowe | 8 | 0 | 16.0 | 0 | 2 | 0 | 3.38 | 13 |
| Rich Garcés | 12 | 0 | 13.2 | 0 | 1 | 0 | 4.61 | 12 |
| Robinson Checo | 5 | 2 | 13.1 | 1 | 1 | 0 | 3.38 | 14 |
| Pat Mahomes | 10 | 0 | 10.0 | 1 | 0 | 0 | 8.10 | 5 |
| Toby Borland | 3 | 0 | 3.1 | 0 | 0 | 0 | 13.50 | 1 |
| Ken Grundt | 2 | 0 | 3.0 | 0 | 0 | 0 | 9.00 | 0 |
| Brian Rose | 1 | 1 | 3.0 | 0 | 0 | 0 | 12.00 | 3 |
| Mike Benjamin | 1 | 0 | 1.0 | 0 | 0 | 0 | 0.00 | 0 |

== Game log ==
| Red Sox Win | Red Sox Loss | Game postponed |

1997 Boston Red Sox Season Game Log: 78–84 (Home: 39–42; Away: 39–42)
April: 13–12

| # | Date | Opponent | Score | Win | Loss | Save | Stadium | Attendance | Record | Streak |
|---|---|---|---|---|---|---|---|---|---|---|
| 1 | April 2 | @ Angels | 6–5 | Mahomes (1–0) | Percival (0–1) | Slocumb (1) | Anaheim Stadium | 30,874 | 1–0 | W1 |
| 2 | April 3 | @ Angels | 0–2 | Dickson (1–0) | Wakefield (0–1) | — | Anaheim Stadium | 17,323 | 1–1 | L1 |
| 3 | April 4 | @ Mariners | 10–5 | Sele (1–0) | Wolcott (0–1) | Henry (1) | Kingdome | 40,716 | 2–1 | W1 |
| 4 | April 5 | @ Mariners | 8–6 | Trlicek (1–0) | Charlton (0–1) | Slocumb (2) | Kingdome | 57,110 | 3–1 | W2 |
| 5 | April 6 | @ Mariners | 7–8 (10) | Charlton (1–1) | Trlicek (1–1) | — | Kingdome | 33,450 | 3–2 | L1 |
| 6 | April 7 | @ Athletics | 2–6 | Lewis (2–0) | Gordon (0–1) | Taylor (4) | Oakland Coliseum | 8,482 | 3–3 | L2 |
| 7 | April 8 | @ Athletics | 13–7 | Trlicek (2–1) | Wengert (0–2) | Henry (2) | Oakland Coliseum | 9,010 | 4–3 | W1 |
| 8 | April 9 | @ Athletics | 3–4 (10) | Small (1–0) | Trlicek (2–2) | — | Oakland Coliseum | 11,057 | 4–4 | L1 |
| 9 | April 11 | Mariners | 3–5 | Johnson (1–0) | Avery (0–1) | Charlton (2) | Fenway Park | 34,210 | 4–5 | L2 |
| 10 | April 12 | Mariners | 1–5 (10) | Fassero (2–0) | Corsi (0–1) | — | Fenway Park | 15,358 | 4–6 | L3 |
| 11 | April 13 | Mariners | 7–1 | Gordon (1–1) | Sanders (0–3) | — | Fenway Park | 30,300 | 5–6 | W1 |
| 12 | April 14 | Athletics | 10–1 | Wakefield (1–1) | Adams (0–1) | — | Fenway Park | 18,166 | 6–6 | W2 |
| 13 | April 15 | Athletics | 7–2 | Sele (2–0) | Karsay (0–1) | — | Fenway Park | 17,862 | 7–6 | W3 |
| 14 | April 16 | Indians | 11–6 | Avery (1–1) | Ogea (2–1) | — | Fenway Park | 21,305 | 8–6 | W4 |
| 15 | April 17 | Indians | 3–4 | Kline (3–0) | Trlicek (2–3) | Mesa (1) | Fenway Park | 17,988 | 8–7 | L1 |
| — | April 18 | Orioles | Postponed (rain). Makeup date June 10. | | | | | | | |
| — | April 19 | Orioles | Postponed (rain). Makeup date June 12. | | | | | | | |
| 16 | April 20 | Orioles | 1–11 | Key (3–0) | Gordon (1–2) | — | Fenway Park | 32,290 | 8–8 | L2 |
| 17 | April 21 | Orioles | 4–2 | Sele (3–0) | Erickson (2–1) | Slocumb (3) | Fenway Park | 33,608 | 9–8 | W1 |
| 18 | April 22 | @ Indians | 8–2 | Avery (2–1) | Ogea (2–2) | Henry (3) | Jacobs Field | 41,800 | 10–8 | W2 |
| 19 | April 23 | @ Indians | 7–11 | McDowell (1–2) | Trlicek (2–4) | — | Jacobs Field | 42,430 | 10–9 | L1 |
| 20 | April 24 | @ Orioles | 2–1 (12) | Trlicek (3–4) | Mathews (0–1) | Henry (4) | Camden Yards | 40,000 | 11–9 | W1 |
| 21 | April 25 | @ Orioles | 0–2 | Erickson (3–1) | Gordon (1–3) | Myers (9) | Camden Yards | 45,227 | 11–10 | L1 |
| 22 | April 26 | @ Orioles | 5–14 | Key (4–0) | Sele (3–1) | Johnson (1) | Camden Yards | 47,727 | 11–11 | L2 |
| 23 | April 27 | @ Orioles | 13–7 | Henry (1–0) | Rhodes (2–1) | — | Camden Yards | 47,307 | 12–11 | W1 |
| 24 | April 29 | Angels | 4–5 | Holtz (2–0) | Henry (1–1) | James (2) | Fenway Park | 19,347 | 12–12 | L1 |
| 25 | April 30 | Angels | 11–2 | Hammond (1–0) | Dickson (4–1) | — | Fenway Park | 20,322 | 13–12 | W1 |

May: 9–17

| # | Date | Opponent | Score | Win | Loss | Save | Stadium | Attendance | Record | Streak |
|---|---|---|---|---|---|---|---|---|---|---|
| — | May 1 | Angels | Postponed (rain). Makeup date July 25. | | | | | | | |
| 26 | May 2 | @ Rangers | 5–4 | Henry (2–1) | Patterson (2–3) | Slocumb (4) | The Ballpark in Arlington | 35,338 | 14–12 | W2 |
| 27 | May 3 | @ Rangers | 6–7 | Vosberg (1–1) | Slocumb (0–1) | — | The Ballpark in Arlington | 43,577 | 14–13 | L1 |
| 28 | May 4 | @ Rangers | 6–7 | Patterson (3–3) | Henry (2–2) | Wetteland (7) | The Ballpark in Arlington | 37,294 | 14–14 | L2 |
| 29 | May 5 | Royals | 0–2 | Appier (4–1) | Hammond (1–1) | — | Fenway Park | 19,061 | 14–15 | L3 |
| 30 | May 6 | Royals | 2–7 | Rosado (3–0) | Gordon (1–4) | Pichardo (5) | Fenway Park | 20,178 | 14–16 | L4 |
| 31 | May 7 | Twins | 11–3 | Sele (4–1) | Radke (2–2) | — | Fenway Park | 19,075 | 15–16 | W1 |
| 32 | May 8 | Twins | 7–10 | Robertson (3–1) | Garcés (0–1) | Aguilera (6) | Fenway Park | 24,959 | 15–17 | L1 |
| 33 | May 9 | Rangers | 1–5 | Witt (6–0) | Wasdin (0–1) | — | Fenway Park | 23,514 | 15–18 | L2 |
| 34 | May 10 | Rangers | 5–11 | Patterson (4–3) | Slocumb (0–2) | — | Fenway Park | 25,084 | 15–19 | L3 |
| 35 | May 11 | Rangers | 6–8 | Santana (1–0) | Gordon (1–5) | Wetteland (8) | Fenway Park | 27,025 | 15–20 | L4 |
| 36 | May 13 | @ Royals | 9–0 | Belcher (5–3) | Sele (4–2) | — | Kauffman Stadium | 13,035 | 15–21 | L5 |
| 37 | May 14 | @ Royals | 2–6 | Veres (3–0) | Wakefield (1–2) | Pichardo (6) | Kauffman Stadium | 13,254 | 15–22 | L6 |
| 38 | May 16 | @ Twins | 5–11 | Aldred (2–5) | Hammond (1–2) | — | Metrodome | 15,311 | 15–23 | L7 |
| 39 | May 17 | @ Twins | 4–0 | Gordon (2–5) | Radke (2–2) | — | Metrodome | 18,388 | 16–23 | W1 |
| 40 | May 18 | @ Twins | 5–7 | Robertson (4–2) | Sele (4–3) | Aguilera (7) | Metrodome | 13,879 | 16–24 | L1 |
| 41 | May 20 | @ White Sox | 1–10 | Navarro (4–2) | Wakefield (1–3) | — | Comiskey Park | 16,563 | 16–25 | L2 |
| 42 | May 21 | @ White Sox | 5–10 | Drabek (3–3) | Hammond (1–3) | — | Comiskey Park | 18,814 | 16–26 | L3 |
| 43 | May 22 | @ Yankees | 8–2 | Gordon (3–5) | Wells (4–3) | — | Yankee Stadium | 28,255 | 17–26 | W1 |
| 44 | May 23 | @ Yankees | 9–3 | Sele (5–3) | Nelson (1–4) | — | Yankee Stadium | 29,003 | 18–26 | W2 |
| 45 | May 24 | @ Yankees | 2–4 | Rivera (1–1) | Wasdin (0–2) | — | Yankee Stadium | 44,094 | 18–27 | L1 |
| — | May 25 | @ Yankees | Postponed (rain). Makeup date September 16. | | | | | | | |
| 46 | May 26 | Brewers | 3–2 | Hammond (2–3) | Jones (3–1) | — | Fenway Park | 28,438 | 19–27 | W1 |
| 47 | May 27 | Brewers | 7–6 | Corsi (1–1) | Adamson (1–1) | Slocumb (5) | Fenway Park | 24,396 | 20–27 | W2 |
| 48 | May 28 | White Sox | 5–3 | Sele (6–3) | Álvarez (3–6) | Slocumb (6) | Fenway Park | 28,078 | 21–27 | W3 |
| 49 | May 29 | White Sox | 2–5 (11) | Hernández (3–1) | Wasdin (0–3) | Simas (1) | Fenway Park | 27,775 | 21–28 | L1 |
| 50 | May 30 | Yankees | 10–4 | Hammond (3–3) | Mendoza (3–2) | — | Fenway Park | 32,341 | 22–28 | W1 |
| 51 | May 31 | Yankees | 2–7 | Pettitte (7–3) | Wakefield (1–4) | — | Fenway Park | 55,191 | 22–29 | L1 |

June: 14–15

| # | Date | Opponent | Score | Win | Loss | Save | Stadium | Attendance | Record | Streak |
|---|---|---|---|---|---|---|---|---|---|---|
| 52 | June 1 | Yankees | 6–11 (15) | Nelson (2–4) | Lacy (0–1) | — | Fenway Park | 31,798 | 22–30 | L2 |
| 53 | June 2 | Yankees | 2–5 | Wells (6–3) | Sele (6–4) | Rivera (16) | Fenway Park | 31,329 | 22–31 | L3 |
| 54 | June 3 | @ Brewers | 4–6 | Wickman (3–2) | Slocumb (0–3) | — | Milwaukee County Stadium | 16,139 | 22–32 | L4 |
| 55 | June 4 | @ Brewers | 11–13 | Eldred (6–5) | Brandenburg (0–1) | Jones (14) | Milwaukee County Stadium | 13,089 | 22–33 | L5 |
| 56 | June 5 | @ Brewers | 2–1 | Wakefield (2–4) | McDonald (6–4) | Lacy (1) | Milwaukee County Stadium | 13,196 | 23–33 | W1 |
| 57 | June 6 | Indians | 3–7 | Hershiser (6–2) | Gordon (3–6) | — | Fenway Park | 30,202 | 23–34 | L1 |
| 58 | June 7 | Indians | 5–9 | Colón (1–2) | Sele (6–5) | — | Fenway Park | 32,780 | 23–35 | L2 |
| 59 | June 8 | Indians | 12–6 | Hudson (1–0) | Ogea (5–5) | — | Fenway Park | 32,155 | 24–35 | W1 |
| 60 | June 10 (1) | Orioles | 2–7 | Erickson (9–2) | Eshelman (0–1) | — | Fenway Park | — | 24–36 | L1 |
| 61 | June 10 (2) | Orioles | 2–4 | Rhodes (3–2) | Wakefield (2–5) | Myers (20) | Fenway Park | 30,995 | 24–37 | L2 |
| 62 | June 11 | Orioles | 10–1 | Gordon (4–6) | Johnson (0–1) | — | Fenway Park | 26,479 | 25–37 | W1 |
| 63 | June 12 | Orioles | 9–5 | Sele (7–5) | Kamieniecki (4–3) | — | Fenway Park | 24,970 | 26–37 | W2 |
| 64 | June 13 | @ Mets | 8–4 | Suppan (1–0) | Reed (4–4) | Lacy (2) | Shea Stadium | 44,443 | 27–37 | W3 |
| 65 | June 14 | @ Mets | 2–5 | Clark (6–4) | Wakefield (2–6) | Franco (17) | Shea Stadium | 35,456 | 27–38 | L1 |
| 66 | June 15 | @ Mets | 10–1 | Eshelman (1–1) | Jones (11–3) | — | Shea Stadium | 23,557 | 28–38 | W1 |
| 67 | June 16 | Phillies | 5–4 (10) | Wasdin (1–3) | Bottalico (1–3) | — | Fenway Park | 26,926 | 29–38 | W2 |
| 68 | June 17 | Phillies | 12–6 | Sele (8–5) | Ruffcorn (0–1) | Lacy (3) | Fenway Park | 25,591 | 30–38 | W3 |
| 69 | June 18 | Phillies | 4–2 | Suppan (2–0) | Schilling (8–6) | Hammond (1) | Fenway Park | 27,502 | 31–38 | W4 |
| 70 | June 20 | @ Tigers | 6–12 | Thompson (7–5) | Wakefield (2–7) | Sager (3) | Tiger Stadium | 20,091 | 31–39 | L1 |
| 71 | June 21 | @ Tigers | 4–15 | Bautista (1–1) | Eshelman (1–2) | — | Tiger Stadium | 20,559 | 31–40 | L2 |
| 72 | June 22 | @ Tigers | 2–1 | Gordon (5–6) | Blair (4–4) | Slocumb (7) | Tiger Stadium | 19,477 | 32–40 | W1 |
| 73 | June 23 | @ Blue Jays | 7–6 | Sele (9–5) | Williams (2–7) | Slocumb (8) | SkyDome | 30,380 | 33–40 | W2 |
| 74 | June 24 | @ Blue Jays | 9–6 | Wasdin (2–3) | Andújar (0–4) | Slocumb (9) | SkyDome | 27,263 | 34–40 | W3 |
| 75 | June 25 | @ Blue Jays | 13–12 | Wakefield (3–7) | Hentgen (8–4) | Slocumb (10) | SkyDome | 27,605 | 35–40 | W4 |
| 76 | June 26 | Tigers | 6–10 | Moehler (5–6) | Eshelman (1–3) | — | Fenway Park | 31,878 | 35–41 | L1 |
| 77 | June 27 | Tigers | 1–2 (11) | Miceli (1–1) | Hammond (3–4) | Jones (9) | Fenway Park | 26,753 | 35–42 | L2 |
| 78 | June 28 | Tigers | 2–9 | Lira (5–4) | Sele (9–6) | — | Fenway Park | 30,886 | 35–43 | L3 |
| 79 | June 29 | Tigers | 8–6 | Wasdin (3–3) | Bautista (1–2) | Slocumb (11) | Fenway Park | 30,884 | 36–43 | W1 |
| 80 | June 30 | Marlins | 5–8 | Fernandez (9–6) | Wakefield (3–8) | — | Fenway Park | 27,127 | 36–44 | L1 |

July: 15–13

| # | Date | Opponent | Score | Win | Loss | Save | Stadium | Attendance | Record | Streak |
|---|---|---|---|---|---|---|---|---|---|---|
| 81 | July 1 | Marlins | 9–2 | Eshelman (2–3) | Rapp (4–6) | Corsi (1) | Fenway Park | 25,538 | 37–44 | W1 |
| 82 | July 2 | Marlins | 2–3 | Brown (8–5) | Gordon (5–7) | Nen (24) | Fenway Park | 31,405 | 37–45 | L1 |
| 83 | July 3 | @ White Sox | 4–1 | Sele (10–6) | Drabek (6–6) | — | Comiskey Park | 20,521 | 38–45 | W1 |
| 84 | July 4 | @ White Sox | 5–6 | Hernández (5–1) | Slocumb (0–4) | — | Comiskey Park | 30,007 | 38–46 | L1 |
| 85 | July 5 | @ White Sox | 8–11 | Darwin (3–6) | Avery (2–2) | — | Comiskey Park | 25,802 | 38–47 | L2 |
| 86 | July 6 | @ White Sox | 5–6 | Baldwin (6–9) | Wakefield (3–9) | Hernández (20) | Comiskey Park | 25,153 | 38–48 | L3 |
| 87 | July 10 | Blue Jays | 8–7 (11) | Eshelman (3–3) | Timlin (2–1) | — | Fenway Park | 30,913 | 39–48 | W1 |
| 88 | July 11 | Blue Jays | 4–8 | Hentgen (9–6) | Wasdin (3–4) | — | Fenway Park | 32,543 | 39–49 | L1 |
| 89 | July 12 | Blue Jays | 1–3 | Clemens (14–3) | Sele (10–7) | Spoljaric (3) | Fenway Park | 33,106 | 39–50 | L2 |
| 90 | July 13 | Blue Jays | 2–3 | Williams (4–8) | Wakefield (3–10) | Escobar (1) | Fenway Park | 32,418 | 39–51 | L3 |
| 91 | July 14 | Tigers | 18–4 | Suppan (3–0) | Jarvis (0–2) | — | Fenway Park | 21,997 | 40–51 | W1 |
| 92 | July 15 | Tigers | 5–7 (12) | Jones (2–3) | Wasdin (3–5) | — | Fenway Park | 25,882 | 40–52 | L1 |
| 93 | July 16 | @ Orioles | 4–1 | Avery (3–2) | Key (12–6) | Slocumb (12) | Camden Yards | 47,712 | 41–52 | W1 |
| 94 | July 17 | @ Orioles | 12–9 | Mahay (1–0) | Orosco (2–2) | Slocumb (13) | Camden Yards | 47,912 | 42–52 | W2 |
| 95 | July 18 | @ Indians | 7–0 | Wakefield (4–10) | Colón (2–3) | — | Jacobs Field | 43,037 | 43–52 | W3 |
| 96 | July 19 | @ Indians | 7–10 | Suppan (4–0) | Clark (0–1) | Slocumb (14) | Jacobs Field | 43,070 | 44–52 | W4 |
| 97 | July 20 | @ Indians | 2–7 | Nagy (10–6) | Gordon (5–8) | — | Jacobs Field | 42,932 | 44–53 | L1 |
| 98 | July 21 | @ Indians | 3–1 | Avery (4–2) | Wright (2–1) | Slocumb (15) | Jacobs Field | 42,851 | 45–53 | W1 |
| 99 | July 22 | Athletics | 4–3 | Henry (3–2) | Groom (1–2) | Slocumb (16) | Fenway Park | 27,864 | 46–53 | W2 |
| 100 | July 23 | Athletics | 2–5 | Wengert (5–9) | Wakefield (4–11) | Taylor (18) | Fenway Park | 29,213 | 46–54 | L1 |
| 101 | July 24 | Athletics | 3–0 | Suppan (5–0) | Rigby (0–4) | Slocumb (17) | Fenway Park | 29,312 | 47–54 | W1 |
| 102 | July 25 (1) | Angels | 4–5 | Finley (9–6) | Gordon (5–9) | — | Fenway Park | 20,427 | 47–55 | L1 |
| 103 | July 25 (2) | Angels | 5–8 | Holtz (3–2) | Wakefield (4–12) | Percival (14) | Fenway Park | 24,631 | 47–56 | L2 |
| 104 | July 26 | Angels | 7–6 | Henry (4–2) | Percival (4–5) | — | Fenway Park | 32,148 | 48–56 | W1 |
| 105 | July 27 | Angels | 6–5 | Mahay (2–0) | James (4–3) | — | Fenway Park | 28,454 | 49–56 | W2 |
| 106 | July 29 | @ Mariners | 4–0 | Wakefield (5–12) | Johnson (14–3) | — | Kingdome | 33,293 | 50–56 | W3 |
| 107 | July 30 | @ Mariners | 8–7 (10) | Jim Corsi (2–1) | Hurtado (1–2) | — | Kingdome | 33,056 | 51–56 | W4 |
| 108 | July 31 | @ Royals | 2–3 (10) | Carrasco (2–3) | Slocumb (0–5) | — | Kauffman Stadium | 20,544 | 51–57 | L1 |

August: 16–13

| # | Date | Opponent | Score | Win | Loss | Save | Stadium | Attendance | Record | Streak |
|---|---|---|---|---|---|---|---|---|---|---|
| 109 | August 1 | @ Royals | 10–3 | Avery (5–2) | Rosado (7–8) | — | Kauffman Stadium | 20,060 | 52–57 | W1 |
| 110 | August 2 | @ Royals | 3–10 | Belcher (11–9) | Sele (10–8) | — | Kauffman Stadium | 19,701 | 52–58 | L1 |
| 111 | August 3 | @ Royals | 2–5 | Bones (2–4) | Wakefield (5–13) | Montgomery (6) | Kauffman Stadium | 17,649 | 52–59 | L2 |
| 112 | August 4 | @ Rangers | 11–5 | Henry (5–2) | Patterson (7–5) | — | The Ballpark at Arlington | 29,601 | 53–59 | W1 |
| 113 | August 5 | @ Rangers | 13–1 | Gordon (6–9) | Alberro (0–3) | — | The Ballpark at Arlington | 36,289 | 54–59 | W2 |
| 114 | August 6 | @ Twins | 5–2 | Wakefield (6–13) | Robertson (7–10) | Henry (5) | Metrodome | 12,450 | 55–59 | W3 |
| 115 | August 7 | @ Twins | 7–6 | Sele (11–8) | Bowers (0–1) | Corsi (2) | Metrodome | 11,899 | 56–59 | W4 |
| 116 | August 8 | Royals | 8–2 | Avery (6–2) | Bones (2–5) | — | Fenway Park | 31,777 | 57–59 | W5 |
| 117 | August 9 | Royals | 2–9 | Rusch (4–8) | Suppan (5–1) | — | Fenway Park | 31,410 | 57–60 | L1 |
| 118 | August 10 | Royals | 6–4 | Corsi (3–1) | Carrasco (2–4) | — | Fenway Park | 27,743 | 58–60 | W1 |
| 119 | August 11 | Rangers | 3–8 | Oliver (9–10) | Wakefield (6–14) | — | Fenway Park | 28,640 | 58–61 | L1 |
| 120 | August 12 | Rangers | 2–12 | Witt (11–8) | Sele (11–9) | — | Fenway Park | 26,213 | 58–62 | L2 |
| 121 | August 13 | Rangers | 6–7 | Sturtze (1–0) | Avery (6–3) | Wetteland (26) | Fenway Park | 24,522 | 58–63 | L3 |
| 122 | August 14 | Twins | 6–1 | Suppan (6–1) | Radke (16–7) | — | Fenway Park | 31,207 | 59–63 | W1 |
| 123 | August 15 | Twins | 5–4 (10) | Lacy (1–1) | Guardado (4–4) | — | Fenway Park | 25,328 | 60–63 | W2 |
| 124 | August 16 | Twins | 12–4 | Wakefield (7–14) | Bowers (0–3) | — | Fenway Park | 30,011 | 61–63 | W3 |
| 125 | August 17 | Twins | 10–5 | Sele (12–9) | Tewksbury (4–9) | — | Fenway Park | 30,387 | 62–63 | W4 |
| — | August 19 | @ Athletics | Postponed (rain). Makeup date August 20. | | | | | | | |
| 126 | August 20 (1) | @ Athletics | 7–5 | Wakefield (8–14) | Haynes (1–3) | Henry (6) | Oakland Coliseum | — | 63–63 | W5 |
| 127 | August 20 (2) | @ Athletics | 5–4 (13) | Hudson (2–0) | Wengert (5–10) | Gordon (1) | Oakland Coliseum | 11,382 | 64–63 | W6 |
| 128 | August 21 | @ Athletics | 6–13 | Lorraine (2–0) | Avery (6–4) | — | Oakland Coliseum | 11,570 | 64–64 | L1 |
| 129 | August 22 | @ Angels | 5–8 | Watson (11–7) | Saberhagen (0–1) | Percival (21) | Anaheim Stadium | 24,977 | 64–65 | L2 |
| 130 | August 23 | @ Angels | 1–6 | Dickson (13–5) | Sele (12–10) | — | Anaheim Stadium | 20,944 | 64–66 | L3 |
| 131 | August 24 | @ Angels | 3–2 | Wakefield (9–14) | Hill (6–11) | Gordon (2) | Anaheim Stadium | 20,733 | 65–66 | W1 |
| 132 | August 25 | @ Mariners | 9–8 | Hudson (3–0) | Slocumb (0–8) | Gordon (3) | Kingdome | 29,939 | 66–66 | W2 |
| 133 | August 26 | @ Mariners | 2–8 | Moyer (14–4) | Avery (6–5) | — | Kingdome | 32,287 | 66–67 | L1 |
| 134 | August 27 | @ Mariners | 9–5 | Wasdin (4–5) | Fassero (13–8) | Gordon (4) | Kingdome | 34,633 | 67–67 | W1 |
| 135 | August 29 | Braves | 1–9 | Smoltz (13–10) | Sele (12–11) | — | Fenway Park | 32,577 | 67–68 | L1 |
| 136 | August 30 | Braves | 2–15 | Millwood (3–3) | Wakefield (9–15) | — | Fenway Park | 32,865 | 67–69 | L2 |
| 137 | August 31 | Braves | 3–7 | Glavine (12–6) | Avery (6–6) | — | Fenway Park | 33,147 | 67–70 | L3 |

September: 11–14

| # | Date | Opponent | Score | Win | Loss | Save | Stadium | Attendance | Record | Streak |
|---|---|---|---|---|---|---|---|---|---|---|
| 138 | September 1 | @ Expos | 2–4 (10) | Urbina (4–8) | Hudson (3–1) | — | Olympic Stadium | 29,024 | 67–71 | L4 |
| 139 | September 2 | @ Expos | 5–6 | DeHart (1–1) | Brandenburg (0–2) | Urbina (24) | Olympic Stadium | 12,538 | 67–72 | L5 |
| 140 | September 3 | @ Expos | 1–0 | Pérez (12–10) | Sele (12–12) | — | Olympic Stadium | 11,509 | 67–73 | L6 |
| 141 | September 5 | Brewers | 1–7 | Eldred (12–12) | Suppan (6–2) | — | Fenway Park | 27,522 | 67–74 | L7 |
| 142 | September 6 | Brewers | 10–2 | Wakefield (10–15) | Harnisch (0–2) | — | Fenway Park | 28,686 | 68–74 | W1 |
| 143 | September 7 | Brewers | 11–2 | Henry (6–2) | D'Amico (8–5) | — | Fenway Park | 27,731 | 69–74 | W2 |
| 144 | September 9 | Yankees | 6–8 | Banks (1–0) | Lowe (2–5) | Rivera (41) | Fenway Park | 32,355 | 69–75 | L1 |
| 145 | September 10 | Yankees | 5–2 | Sele (13–12) | Wells (14–10) | Gordon (5) | Fenway Park | 31,011 | 70–75 | W1 |
| 146 | September 12 | @ Brewers | 4–2 | Suppan (7–2) | D'Amico (8–6) | Gordon (6) | Milwaukee County Stadium | 22,079 | 71–75 | W2 |
| 147 | September 13 | @ Brewers | 2–1 | Wakefield (11–15) | Karl (10–12) | Gordon (7) | Milwaukee County Stadium | 22,288 | 72–75 | W3 |
| 148 | September 14 | @ Brewers | 2–1 | Henry (7–2) | Mercedes (6–10) | Gordon (8) | Milwaukee County Stadium | 28,633 | 73–75 | W4 |
| 149 | September 15 | @ Yankees | 6–7 | Rivera (5–4) | Corsi (3–2) | — | Yankee Stadium | 25,873 | 73–76 | L1 |
| 150 | September 16 (1) | @ Yankees | 0–2 | Pettitte (18–7) | Wasdin (4–6) | Rivera (42) | Yankee Stadium | — | 73–77 | L2 |
| 151 | September 16 (2) | @ Yankees | 3–4 | Banks (2–0) | Checo (0–1) | Rivera (43) | Yankee Stadium | 29,145 | 73–78 | L3 |
| 152 | September 17 | Blue Jays | 4–3 | Mahay (3–0) | Quantrill (6–7) | Gordon (9) | Fenway Park | 23,648 | 74–78 | W1 |
| 153 | September 18 | Blue Jays | 3–2 | Corsi (4–2) | Escobar (3–2) | — | Fenway Park | 27,990 | 75–78 | W2 |
| 154 | September 19 | White Sox | 4–5 | Foulke (4–5) | Lowe (2–6) | Castillo (3) | Fenway Park | 27,647 | 75–79 | L1 |
| 155 | September 20 | White Sox | 4–6 | McElroy (1–3) | Avery (6–7) | Castillo (4) | Fenway Park | 30,549 | 75–80 | L2 |
| 156 | September 21 | White Sox | 5–2 | Corsi (5–2) | Fordham (0–1) | Gordon (10) | Fenway Park | 27,229 | 76–80 | W1 |
| 157 | September 23 | @ Tigers | 0–6 | Keagle (3–4) | Suppan (7–3) | — | Tiger Stadium | 43,039 | 76–81 | L1 |
| 158 | September 24 | @ Tigers | 9–2 | Wakefield (12–15) | Blair (16–8) | — | Tiger Stadium | 10,067 | 77–81 | W1 |
| 159 | September 25 | @ Tigers | 3–1 | Checo (1–1) | Sanders (6–14) | Gordon (11) | Tiger Stadium | 14,495 | 78–81 | W2 |
| 160 | September 26 | @ Blue Jays | 0–3 | Williams (9–14) | Henry (7–3) | — | SkyDome | 34,155 | 78–82 | L1 |
| 161 | September 27 | @ Blue Jays | 5–12 | Janzen (2–1) | Corsi (5–3) | — | SkyDome | 37,401 | 78–83 | L2 |
| 162 | September 28 | @ Blue Jays | 2–3 | Plesac (2–4) | Gordon (6–10) | — | SkyDome | 40,251 | 78–84 | L3 |

== Awards and honors ==
- Nomar Garciaparra – Silver Slugger Award (SS), American League Rookie of the Year

All-Star Game

- Nomar Garciaparra, reserve SS

== Farm system ==
This was the first season that the Red Sox fielded their own team in the Dominican Summer League.

| Level | Team | League | Manager |
|---|---|---|---|
| AAA | Pawtucket Red Sox | International League | Ken Macha |
| AA | Trenton Thunder | Eastern League | DeMarlo Hale |
| A-Advanced | Sarasota Red Sox | Florida State League | Rob Derksen |
| A | Michigan Battle Cats | Midwest League | Billy Gardner Jr. |
| A-Short Season | Lowell Spinners | New York–Penn League | Dick Berardino |
| Rookie | GCL Red Sox | Gulf Coast League | Luis Aguayo |
| Rookie | DSL Red Sox | Dominican Summer League | Nelson Norman |
