= 1997 Baltimore Orioles season =

Major League Baseball season

1997 Baltimore Orioles
- American League East champions
- League: American League
- Division: East
- Ballpark: Oriole Park at Camden Yards
- City: Baltimore, Maryland
- Record: 98–64 (.605)
- Divisional place: 1st
- Owners: Peter Angelos
- General managers: Pat Gillick
- Managers: Davey Johnson
- Television: WJZ-TV/WNUV/WBDC; Home Team Sports (Jim Palmer, Mike Flanagan, Michael Reghi)
- Radio: WBAL (AM) (Chuck Thompson, Fred Manfra, Jim Hunter)

The 1997 Baltimore Orioles season was the 97th season in Baltimore Orioles franchise history, the 44th in Baltimore, and the 6th at Oriole Park at Camden Yards.

The Orioles finished first in the American League East Division with a record of 98 wins and 64 losses. They met the Seattle Mariners in the ALDS, and beat them in four games. However, in the ALCS, they played the Cleveland Indians, where they fell in six games. It was the final season for Davey Johnson as manager, as a disagreement with ownership drove him out. The 1997 season was the Orioles' last winning season and playoff appearance until 2012, 15 years later.

== Offseason ==
- December 10, 1996: Jimmy Key was signed as a free agent with the Baltimore Orioles.
- December 13, 1996: Mike Bordick was signed as a free agent with the Baltimore Orioles.
- December 18, 1996: Jerome Walton was signed as a free agent with the Baltimore Orioles.
- December 19, 1996: Eric Davis was signed as a free agent with the Baltimore Orioles.
- March 22, 1997: Scott McClain was traded by the Baltimore Orioles with Manny Alexander to the New York Mets for Hector Ramirez.

=== Roster ===
1997 Baltimore Orioles
Roster
Pitchers: 49 Armando Benítez; 32 Shawn Boskie; 27 Rocky Coppinger; 19 Scott Erickson; 39,59 Mike Johnson; 30 Scott Kamieniecki; 21 Jimmy Key; 38 Rick Krivda; 51 Terry Mathews; 75 Alan Mills; 35 Mike Mussina; 28 Randy Myers; 47 Jesse Orosco; 53 Arthur Rhodes; 39 Nerio Rodríguez; 55 Brian Williams; 56 Esteban Yan	Catchers: 34 Charlie Greene; 23 Chris Hoiles; 37 Tim Laker; 50 Mel Rosario; 42 Lenny Webster; Infielders: 12 Roberto Alomar; 14 Mike Bordick; 6 Aaron Ledesma; 25 Rafael Palmeiro; 36 Jeff Reboulet; 8 Cal Ripken Jr.	Outfielders: 9 Brady Anderson; 10,3 Harold Baines; 10,29 Gerónimo Berroa; 37 Danny Clyburn; 24 Eric Davis; 26 David Dellucci; 11 Jeffrey Hammonds; 26,29 Pete Incaviglia; 17 B. J. Surhoff; 3,43 Tony Tarasco; 1 Jerome Walton	Manager: 15 Davey Johnson; Coaches: 48 Rick Down; 55 Andy Etchebarren; 44 Elrod Hendricks; 31 Ray Miller; 2 Sam Perlozzo; 18 John Stearns

== Regular season ==
=== Season standings ===
AL East
Team	W	L	Pct.	GB	Home	Road
Baltimore Orioles	98	64	.605	—	46‍–‍35	52‍–‍29
New York Yankees	96	66	.593	2	47‍–‍33	49‍–‍33
Detroit Tigers	79	83	.488	19	42‍–‍39	37‍–‍44
Boston Red Sox	78	84	.481	20	39‍–‍42	39‍–‍42
Toronto Blue Jays	76	86	.469	22	42‍–‍39	34‍–‍47

=== Record vs. opponents ===
1997 American League record Source: MLB Standings Grid – 1997
Team	ANA	BAL	BOS	CWS	CLE	DET	KC	MIL	MIN	NYY	OAK	SEA	TEX	TOR	NL
Anaheim	—	4–7	6–5	6–5	7–4	5–6	6–5	7–4	4–7	4–7	11–1	6–6	8–4	6–5	4–12
Baltimore	7–4	—	5–7	5–6	6–5	6–6	7–4	5–6	10–1	8–4	8–3	7–4	10–1	6–6	8–7
Boston	5–6	7–5	—	3–8	6–5	5–7	3–8	8–3	8–3	4–8	7–4	7–4	3–8	6–6	6–9
Chicago	5–6	6–5	8–3	—	5–7	4–7	11–1	4–7	6–6	2–9	8–3	5–6	3–8	5–6	8–7
Cleveland	4–7	5–6	5–6	7–5	—	6–5	8–3	8–4	8–4	5–6	7–4	3–8	5–6	6–5	9–6
Detroit	6–5	6–6	7–5	7–4	5–6	—	6–5	4–7	4–7	2–10	7–4	4–7	7–4	6–6	8–7
Kansas City	5–6	4–7	8–3	1–11	3–8	5–6	—	6–6	7–5	3–8	3–8	5–6	6–5	5–6	6–9
Milwaukee	4–7	6–5	3–8	7–4	4–8	7–4	6–6	—	5–7	4–7	5–6	5–6	7–4	7–4	8–7
Minnesota	7–4	1–10	3–8	6–6	4–8	7–4	5–7	7–5	—	3–8	7–4	5–6	3–8	3–8	7–8
New York	7–4	4–8	8–4	9–2	6–5	10–2	8–3	7–4	8–3	—	6–5	4–7	7–4	7–5	5–10
Oakland	1–11	3–8	4–7	3–8	4–7	4–7	8–3	6–5	4–7	5–6	—	5–7	5–7	6–5	7–9
Seattle	6–6	4–7	4–7	6–5	8–3	7–4	6–5	6–5	6–5	7–4	7–5	—	8–4	8–3	7–9
Texas	4–8	1–10	8–3	8–3	6–5	4–7	5–6	4–7	8–3	4–7	7–5	4–8	—	4–7	10–6
Toronto	5–6	6–6	6–6	6–5	5–6	6–6	6–5	4–7	8–3	5–7	5–6	3–8	7–4	—	4–11

=== Game log ===
1997 game log
April (16–7)

#	Date	Opponent	Score	Win	Loss	Save	Attendance	Record
1	April 2	Royals	7 – 4	Key (1–0)	Walker (0–1)	Myers (1)	46,588	1–0
2	April 3	Royals	6 – 4	Rhodes (1–0)	Montgomery (0–1)	Myers (2)	43,031	2–0
3	April 4	@ Rangers	5 – 4	Erickson (1–0)	Patterson (0–1)	Benítez (1)	26,058	3–0
4	April 5	@ Rangers	9 – 7	Rhodes (2–0)	Oliver (0–1)	Myers (3)	39,073	4–0
5	April 6	@ Rangers	9 – 3	Pavlik (1–0)	Mussina (0–1)		36,156	4–1
6	April 7	@ Royals	6 – 5	Walker (1–1)	Benítez (0–1)		40,052	4–2
7	April 9	@ Royals	4 – 2 (11)	Mills (1–0)	Bevil (0–1)	Myers (4)	12,036	5–2
8	April 11	Rangers	9 – 3	Mussina (1–1)	Burkett (0–1)		40,575	6–2
9	April 13	Rangers	9 – 0	Key (2–0)	Pavlik (1–1)		44,154	7–2
10	April 14	Twins	4 – 2	Erickson (2–0)	Tewksbury (0–2)	Myers (5)	36,288	8–2
11	April 15	Twins	3 – 1	Kamieniecki (1–0)	Aldred (0–2)	Myers (6)	40,196	9–2
12	April 16	@ White Sox	9 – 3	Drabek (1–1)	Boskie (0–1)		14,061	9–3
13	April 17	@ White Sox	1 – 0	Mussina (2–1)	Darwin (0–1)	Myers (7)	14,674	10–3
14	April 20	@ Red Sox	11 – 1	Key (3–0)	Gordon (1–2)		32,290	11–3
15	April 21	@ Red Sox	4 – 2	Sele (3–0)	Erickson (2–1)	Slocumb (3)	33,608	11–4
16	April 22	White Sox	3 – 2	Mussina (3–1)	Darwin (0–2)	Myers (8)	38,392	12–4
17	April 23	White Sox	11 – 9 (11)	Castillo (2–2)	Benítez (0–2)	Hernandez (3)	42,902	12–5
18	April 24	Red Sox	2 – 1 (11)	Trlicek (3–4)	Mathews (0–1)	Henry (4)	40,000	12–6
19	April 25	Red Sox	2 – 0	Erickson (3–1)	Gordon (1–3)	Myers (9)	45,227	13–6
20	April 26	Red Sox	14 – 5	Key (4–0)	Sele (3–1)	Johnson (1)	47,727	14–6
21	April 27	Red Sox	13 – 7	Henry (1–0)	Rhodes (2–1)		47,307	14–7
22	April 29	@ Twins	6 – 4	Boskie (1–1)	Swindell (1–1)	Myers (10)	11,368	15–7
23	April 30	@ Twins	12 – 3	Kamieniecki (2–0)	Tewksbury (1–4)	Benítez (2)	12,686	16–7

May (20–8)

#	Date	Opponent	Score	Win	Loss	Save	Attendance	Record
24	May 1	@ Twins	3–2	Erickson (4–1)	Aldred (1–3)	Myers (11)	11,678	17–7
25	May 2	Athletics	7–1	Key (5–0)	Karsay (0–3)		46,181	18–7
26	May 3	Athletics	4–3	Small (4–0)	Myers (0–1)	Taylor (6)	45,780	18–8
27	May 4	Athletics	11–0	Coppinger (1–0)	Prieto (2–2)	Johnson (2)	47,001	19–8
28	May 5	Angels	7–2	Dickson (5–1)	Kamieniecki (2–1)	James (3)	41,296	19–9
29	May 6	Angels	8–4	Erickson (5–1)	Finley (0–2)	Myers (12)	37,150	20–9
30	May 7	Angels	3–0	Key (6–0)	Watson (0–2)	Myers (13)	43,858	21–9
31	May 8	Mariners	13–3	Mussina (4–1)	Johnson (4–1)		45,026	22–9
32	May 9	Mariners	8–2	Moyer (2–0)	Coppinger (1–1)		47,257	22–10
33	May 10	Mariners	3 – 2 (11)	Charlton (2–1)	Myers (0–2)		47,340	22–11
34	May 11	Mariners	9–5	Erickson (6–1)	Martínez (1–3)		47,451	23–11
35	May 12	@ Athletics	5–1	Key (7–0)	Karsay (0–4)	Benítez (3)	11,352	24–11
36	May 13	@ Athletics	7–3	Mussina (5–1)	Mohler (0–5)		14,854	25–11
37	May 14	@ Angels	6–5	Springer (1–1)	Boskie (1–2)	Holtz (1)	15,780	25–12
38	May 15	@ Angels	3–2	Dickson (6–1)	Kamieniecki (2–2)	James (5)	15,966	25–13
39	May 16	@ Mariners	6–3	Erickson (7–1)	Martínez (1–4)		39,455	26–13
40	May 17	@ Mariners	4–3	Key (8–0)	Sanders (0–5)	Benítez (4)	57,304	27–13
41	May 18	@ Mariners	8–7	Orosco (1–0)	Charlton (2–3)	Benítez (5)	57,432	28–13
42	May 20	Tigers	4–3	Kamieniecki (3–2)	Olivares (2–3)	Myers (14)	48,003	29–13
43	May 21	Tigers	2–0	Erickson (8–1)	Thompson (4–3)	Myers (15)	47,877	30–13
44	May 23	@ Indians	6–1	Ogea (5–3)	Key (8–1)		41,154	30–14
45	May 24	@ Indians	8–3	Mussina (6–1)	Kline (3–1)		41,040	31–14
46	May 25	@ Indians	7–6	Nagy (6–2)	Rhodes (2–2)	Morman (2)	42,944	31–15
47	May 26	@ Yankees	8–6	Boskie (2–2)	Pettittie (6–3)	Myers (16)	40,296	32–15
48	May 27	@ Yankees	10–6	Kamieniecki (2–2)	Rogers (6–3)	Benítez (6)	29,392	33–15
49	May 28	@ Yankees	8–1	Key (9–1)	Moehler (3–4)	Boskie (1)	10,692	34–15
50	May 30	Indians	3–0	Mussina (7–1)	Nagy (6–3)		47,758	35–15
51	May 31	Indians	8–5	Boskie (3–2)	Mesa (0–3)	Myers (17)	47,739	36–15

June (15–12)

#	Date	Opponent	Score	Win	Loss	Save	Attendance	Record
52	June 3	Yankees	7–5	Myers (1–2)	Mecir (0–3)		47,577	37–15
53	June 4	Yankees	9–7	Orosco (2–0)	Nelson (2–5)	Myers (18)	47,748	38–15
54	June 6	@ White Sox	7–3	Drabek (5–4)	Erickson (8–2)	R. Hernandez (12)	21,304	38–16
55	June 7	@ White Sox	1 – 0 (11)	R. Hernández (4–1)	Myers (1–3)		31,548	38–17
56	June 8	@ White Sox	2–1	Key (10–1)	Darwin (2–3)	Myers (19)	24,089	39–17
57	June 9	@ White Sox	10–2	Mussina (8–1)	Baldwin (3–8)		23,464	40–17
58	June 10	@ Red Sox	7–2	Erickson (9–2)	Eshelman (0–1)			41–17
59	June 10	@ Red Sox	4–2	Rhodes (3–2)	Wakefield (2–5)	Myers (20)	30,995	42–17
60	June 11	@ Red Sox	10–1	Gordon (4–6)	Johnson (0–1)		26,479	42–18
61	June 12	@ Red Sox	9–5	Sele (7–5)	Kamieniecki (4–3)		24,970	42–19
62	June 13	@ Braves	4 – 3	Key (11–1)	Maddux (7–3)	Myers (21)	48,334	43–19
63	June 14	@ Braves	6 – 4 (12)	Rhodes (4–2)	Borowski (2–2)	Myers (22)	26,964	44–19
64	June 15	@ Braves	5 – 3 (10)	Mathews (1–1)	Wohlers (2–2)	Myers (23)	48,088	45–19
65	June 16	Expos	6 – 4	Hermanson (3–4)	Boskie (3–3)	Urbina (12)	47,557	45–20
66	June 17	Expos	5 – 4	Kamieniecki (5–3)	Bullinger (4–6)	Myers (24)	47,793	46–20
67	June 18	Expos	1 – 0	C. Perez (8–4)	Key (11–2)		47,448	46–21
68	June 20	@ Blue Jays	3 – 0	Hentgen (8–3)	Mussina (8–2)		30,266	46–22
69	June 21	@ Blue Jays	5 – 1	Erickson (10–2)	Plesac (0–3)		40,139	47–22
70	June 22	@ Blue Jays	5 – 2	Kamieniecki (6–3)	Person (2–5)	Myers (25)	35,106	48–22
71	June 23	@ Brewers	5 – 0	D'Amico (5–3)	Key (11–3)		16,304	48–23
72	June 24	@ Brewers	6 – 2	Boskie (4–3)	Karl (2–9)	Rhodes (1)	14,007	49–23
73	June 25	@ Brewers	9 – 1	Mussina (9–2)	Eldred (7–8)		21,042	50–23
74	June 26	Blue Jays	3 – 0	Clemens (12–2)	Erickson (10–3)	Timlin (7)	47,617	50–24
75	June 27	Blue Jays	2 – 1	Person (3–5)	Kamieniecki (6–4)	Spoljaric (2)	47,900	50–25
76	June 28	Blue Jays	5 – 2	W. Williams (3–7)	Key (11–4)	Timlin (8)	47,687	50–26
77	June 29	Blue Jays	3 – 2	Escobar (1–0)	Benítez (0–3)	Timlin (9)	47,763	50–27
78	June 30	Phillies	8 – 1	Mussina (10–2)	Maduro (3–7)		47,837	51–27

July (16-11)

#	Date	Opponent	Score	Win	Loss	Save	Attendance	Record
79	July 1	Phillies	4 – 1	Erickson (11–3)	Beech (0–4)	Myers (26)	47,610	52–27
80	July 2	Phillies	10 – 6	Rhodes (5–2)	Spradlin (1–4)		47,785	53–27
81	July 3	@ Tigers	10 – 1	Key (12–4)	Lira (5–5)		13,209	54–27
82	July 4	@ Tigers	4 – 3	Rhodes (6–2)	Keagle (0–1)	Myers (27)	30,100	55–27
83	July 4	@ Tigers	11 – 8	Bautista (2–2)	Mills (1–1)	T. Jones (12)	30,100	55–28
84	July 5	@ Tigers	6 – 5	Miceli (2–1)	Orosco (2–1)	T. Jones (13)	37,074	55–29
85	July 6	@ Tigers	14 – 9	Blair (6–4)	Erickson (11–4)		18,197	55–30
86	July 11	Brewers	3 – 1	McDonald (8–6)	Key (12–5)	D. Jones (21)	47,919	55–31
87	July 12	Brewers	3 – 2	Eldred (9–8)	Erickson (11–5)	D. Jones (22)	47,606	55–32
88	July 13	Brewers	6 – 4	D'Amico (7–4)	Mussina (10–3)	D. Jones (23)	47,448	55–33
89	July 14	Blue Jays	9 – 5	Mathews (2–1)	Person (3–6)		47,042	56–33
90	July 15	Blue Jays	8 – 4	Boskie (5–3)	Guzmán (3–6)		47,062	57–33
91	July 16	Red Sox	4 – 1	Avery (3–2)	Key (12–6)	Slocumb (12)	47,712	57–34
92	July 17	Red Sox	12 – 9	Mahay (1–0)	Orosco (2–2)	Slocumb (13)	47,912	57–35
93	July 18	White Sox	3 – 0	Baldwin (7–9)	Mussina (10–4)	R. Hernández (24)	47,759	57–36
94	July 19	White Sox	8 – 3	Rhodes (7–2)	Simas (3–1)	Benítez (7)	47,857	58–36
95	July 20	White Sox	10 – 2	Navarro (8–8)	Boskie (5–4)		47,800	58–37
96	July 21	@ Rangers	5 – 1	Key (13–6)	Oliver (6–10)		35,842	59–37
97	July 22	@ Rangers	9 – 3	Erickson (12–5)	Burkett (7–9)		43,421	60–37
98	July 23	@ Rangers	3 – 2	Myers (2–3)	Patterson (6–4)		40,834	61–37
99	July 25	@ Twins	5 – 2	Radke (14–5)	Kamieniecki (6–5)		21,524	61–38
100	July 26	@ Twins	2 – 1 (12)	Orosco (3–2)	Aguilera (4–3)	Myers (28)	24,806	62–38
101	July 27	@ Twins	9 – 0	Erickson (13–5)	Robertson (7–8)		19,702	63–38
102	July 28	Rangers	7 – 2	Mussina (11–4)	Witt (10–6)	Benítez (8)	47,627	64–38
103	July 29	Rangers	5 – 4	Krivda (1–0)	Alberro (0–2)	Myers (29)	47,740	65–38
104	July 30	Rangers	3 – 1	Kamieniecki (7–5)	Burkett (7–10)	Myers (30)	47,854	66–38
105	July 31	@ Athletics	4 – 0 (11)	Benítez (1–3)	Johnson (1–3)		9,517	67–38

August (18-10)

#	Date	Opponent	Score	Win	Loss	Save	Attendance	Record

September (13-16)

#	Date	Opponent	Score	Win	Loss	Save	Attendance	Record

== Player stats ==
=== Batting ===
==== Starters by position ====
Note: Pos = Position; G = Games played; AB = At bats; R = Runs; H = Hits; Avg. = Batting average; HR = Home runs; RBI = Runs batted in

Pos	Player	G	AB	R	H	Avg.	HR	RBI
C	Chris Hoiles	99	320	45	83	.259	12	49
1B	Rafael Palmeiro	158	614	95	156	.254	38	110
2B	Roberto Alomar	112	412	64	137	.333	14	60
3B	Cal Ripken Jr.	162	615	79	166	.270	17	84
SS	Mike Bordick	153	509	55	120	.236	7	46
LF	B. J. Surhoff	147	528	80	150	.284	18	88
CF	Brady Anderson	151	590	97	170	.288	18	73
RF	Jeffrey Hammonds	118	397	71	105	.264	21	55

==== Other batters ====
Note: G = Games played; AB = At bats; H = Hits; Avg. = Batting average; HR = Home runs; RBI = Runs batted in

Player	G	AB	H	Avg.	HR	RBI
Lenny Webster	98	259	66	.255	7	37
Jeff Reboulet	99	228	54	.237	4	27
Tony Tarasco	100	166	34	.205	7	26
Eric Davis	42	158	48	.304	8	25
Pete Incaviglia	48	138	34	.246	5	12
Harold Baines	44	134	39	.291	4	15
Aaron Ledesma	43	88	31	.352	2	11
Jerome Walton	26	68	20	.294	3	9
David Dellucci	17	27	6	.222	1	3
Tim Laker	7	14	0	.000	0	1
Melvin Rosario	4	3	0	.000	0	0
Danny Clyburn	2	3	0	.000	0	0
Charlie Greene	5	2	0	.000	0	1

=== Pitching ===
==== Starting pitchers ====
Note: G = Games pitched; IP = Innings pitched; W = Wins; L = Losses; ERA = Earned run average; SO = Strikeouts

Player	G	IP	W	L	ERA	SO
Mike Mussina	33	224.2	15	8	3.20	218
Scott Erickson	33	221.2	16	7	3.69	131
Jimmy Key	34	212.1	16	10	3.43	141
Scott Kamieniecki	30	179.1	10	6	4.01	109
Rick Krivda	10	50.0	4	2	6.30	29

==== Other pitchers ====
Note: G = Games pitched; IP = Innings pitched; W = Wins; L = Losses; ERA = Earned run average; SO = Strikeouts

Player	G	IP	W	L	ERA	SO
Shawn Boskie	28	77.0	6	6	6.43	50
Mike Johnson	14	39.2	0	1	7.94	29
Nerio Rodríguez	6	22.0	2	1	4.91	11
Rocky Coppinger	5	20.0	1	1	6.30	22
Esteban Yan	3	9.2	0	1	15.83	4

==== Relief pitchers ====
Note: G = Games pitched; IP = Innings pitched; W = Wins; L = Losses; SV = Saves; ERA = Earned run average; SO = Strikeouts

Player	G	IP	W	L	SV	ERA	SO
Randy Myers	61	59.2	2	3	45	1.51	56
Arthur Rhodes	53	95.1	10	3	1	3.02	102
Armando Benítez	71	73.1	4	5	9	2.45	106
Terry Mathews	57	63.1	4	4	1	4.41	39
Jesse Orosco	71	50.1	6	3	0	2.32	46
Alan Mills	39	38.2	2	3	0	4.89	32
Brian Williams	13	24.0	0	0	0	3.00	14

== ALDS ==
=== Game 1 ===
October 1, Kingdome

Team	1	2	3	4	5	6	7	8	9	R	H	E
Baltimore	0	0	1	0	4	4	0	0	0	9	13	0
Seattle	0	0	0	1	0	0	1	0	1	3	7	1
W: Mike Mussina (1–0) L: Randy Johnson (0–1) SV: None
HR: BAL – Gerónimo Berroa (1) Chris Hoiles (1) SEA – Edgar Martínez (1) Jay Buhner (1) Alex Rodriguez (1)

=== Game 2 ===
October 2, Kingdome

Team	1	2	3	4	5	6	7	8	9	R	H	E
Baltimore	0	1	0	0	2	0	2	4	0	9	14	0
Seattle	2	0	0	0	0	0	1	0	0	3	9	0
W: Scott Erickson (1–0) L: Jamie Moyer (0–1) SV: None
HR: BAL – Harold Baines (1) Brady Anderson (1) SEA – None

=== Game 3 ===
October 4, Oriole Park at Camden Yards

Team	1	2	3	4	5	6	7	8	9	R	H	E
Seattle	0	0	1	0	1	0	0	0	2	4	11	0
Baltimore	0	0	0	0	0	0	0	0	2	2	5	0
W: Jeff Fassero (1–0) L: Jimmy Key (0–1) SV: None
HR: BAL – None SEA – Jay Buhner (2) Paul Sorrento (1)

=== Game 4 ===
October 5, Oriole Park at Camden Yards

Team	1	2	3	4	5	6	7	8	9	R	H	E
Seattle	0	1	0	0	0	0	0	0	0	1	2	0
Baltimore	2	0	0	0	1	0	0	0	X	3	7	0
W: Mike Mussina (2–0) L: Randy Johnson (0–2) SV: Randy Myers (1)
HR: BAL – Jeff Reboulet (1) Gerónimo Berroa (2) SEA – Edgar Martínez (2)

== ALCS ==
=== Game 1 ===
October 8, Camden Yards

Team	1	2	3	4	5	6	7	8	9	R	H	E
Cleveland	0	0	0	0	0	0	0	0	0	0	4	1
Baltimore	1	0	2	0	0	0	0	0	X	3	6	1
WP: Scott Erickson (1–0) LP: Chad Ogea (0–1) SV: Randy Myers (1)
HRs: BAL – Brady Anderson (1) Roberto Alomar (1)

=== Game 2 ===
October 9, Camden Yards

Team	1	2	3	4	5	6	7	8	9	R	H	E
Cleveland	2	0	0	0	0	0	0	3	0	5	6	3
Baltimore	0	2	0	0	0	2	0	0	0	4	8	1
WP: Paul Assenmacher (1–0) LP: Armando Benítez (0–1) SV: José Mesa (1)
HRs: CLE – Manny Ramírez (1) Marquis Grissom (1) BAL – Cal Ripken (1)

=== Game 3 ===
October 11, Jacobs Field

Team	1	2	3	4	5	6	7	8	9	10	11	12	R	H	E
Baltimore	0	0	0	0	0	0	0	0	1	0	0	0	1	8	1
Cleveland	0	0	0	0	0	0	1	0	0	0	0	1	2	6	0
WP: Eric Plunk (1–0) LP: Randy Myers (0–1)
HRs: None

=== Game 4 ===
October 12, Jacobs Field

Team	1	2	3	4	5	6	7	8	9	R	H	E
Baltimore	0	1	4	0	0	0	1	0	1	7	12	2
Cleveland	0	2	0	1	4	0	0	0	1	8	13	0
WP: José Mesa (1–0) LP: Alan Mills (0–1)
HRs: CLE – Sandy Alomar Jr. (1) Manny Ramírez (2) BAL – Brady Anderson (2) Harold Baines (1) Rafael Palmeiro (1)

=== Game 5 ===
October 13, Jacobs Field

Team	1	2	3	4	5	6	7	8	9	R	H	E
Baltimore	0	0	2	0	0	0	0	0	2	4	10	0
Cleveland	0	0	0	0	0	0	0	0	2	2	8	1
WP: Scott Kamieniecki (1–0) LP: Chad Ogea (0–2)
HRs: BAL – Eric Davis (1)

=== Game 6 ===
October 15, Camden Yards

Team	1	2	3	4	5	6	7	8	9	10	11	R	H	E
Cleveland	0	0	0	0	0	0	0	0	0	0	1	1	3	0
Baltimore	0	0	0	0	0	0	0	0	0	0	0	0	10	0
WP: Brian Anderson (1–0) LP: Armando Benítez (0–2) S: José Mesa (1)
HRs: CLE: – Tony Fernández (1)

== Awards and honors ==
- Eric Davis, Outfield, Roberto Clemente Award
- Eric Davis, Hutch Award
- Harry Dalton, 1997 Herb Armstrong Award (for contribution to the Orioles franchise by a non-uniform personnel

1997 Major League Baseball All-Star Game

- Roberto Alomar, starter
- Cal Ripken Jr., starter

== Farm system ==
Level	Team	League	Manager
AAA	Rochester Red Wings	International League	Marv Foley
AA	Bowie Baysox	Eastern League	Joe Ferguson
A	Frederick Keys	Carolina League	Dave Hilton
A	Delmarva Shorebirds	South Atlantic League	Tommy Shields and Tom Trebelhorn
Rookie	Bluefield Orioles	Appalachian League	Bobby Dickerson
Rookie	GCL Orioles	Gulf Coast League	Butch Davis

LEAGUE CHAMPIONS: Rochester, Delmarva, Bluefield
