= 1997 Minnesota Twins season =

1997 Minnesota Twins
- League: American League
- Division: Central
- Ballpark: Hubert H. Humphrey Metrodome
- City: Minneapolis
- Record: 68–94 (.420)
- Divisional place: 4th
- Owners: Carl Pohlad
- General managers: Terry Ryan
- Managers: Tom Kelly
- Television: WCCO-TV; Midwest Sports Channel (Bert Blyleven, Dick Bremer, Ryan Lefebvre)
- Radio: 830 WCCO AM (Herb Carneal, John Gordon)

The 1997 Minnesota Twins season was the 37th season for the Minnesota Twins franchise in the Twin Cities of Minnesota, their 16th season at Hubert H. Humphrey Metrodome and the 97th overall in the American League.

Manager Tom Kelly's team consisted of a few solid players, but mainly past-their-prime veterans and never-to-be-established prospects. One of the few bright spots was pitcher Brad Radke's breakout season, in which he won 20 games, at one point had 12 consecutive victories, tying a record Scott Erickson set in 1991. The team finished with a 68–94 record, good enough for fourth place in what proved to be the league's weakest division that season. The Cleveland Indians, who won the division that year, made it all the way to the World Series, but lost in seven games to the Florida Marlins.

== Offseason ==
- November 4: Signed Juan Rincón as an amateur free agent.
- December 5: Signed catcher and Minnesota native Terry Steinbach as a free agent.
- December 12: Signed pitcher Bob Tewksbury as a free agent.
- December 18: Signed pitcher Greg Swindell as a free agent.

== Offense ==
In 1996, catcher Terry Steinbach had a 35-home run, 100-RBI season with the Oakland Athletics in a contract year. Unfortunately for the Twins, he followed it up with a 12-home run, 54-RBI season with his hometown team. Scott Stahoviak played in half the games at first base but batted only .229. Second baseman Chuck Knoblauch, the team's lone all-star, had a great year with the Twins, batting .291 and stealing a career-high 62 bases; he won his second Silver Slugger Award. The contrast between his season and his team's season led him to demand a trade, a demand the team obliged by sending him to the New York Yankees the following February. Ron Coomer had a competent year at third, with 13 home runs. He declined to "ride the pines" to protect a .301 batting average, and finished 1 for his last 8 to end at .298. Pat Meares hit .276, an above-average season for him. The primary outfielders – Marty Cordova, Rich Becker, and Matt Lawton – had mediocre seasons. This was disappointing, because Cordova and Becker were coming off of the best years in their careers. Designated hitter Paul Molitor had a good year, batting .305 with 89 RBI, but it did not match his stellar 1996 numbers. Veterans like Roberto Kelly and Greg Colbrunn performed reasonably well off the bench.

Team Leaders
Statistic	Player	Quantity
HR	Marty Cordova	15
RBI	Paul Molitor	89
BA	Paul Molitor	.305
Runs	Chuck Knoblauch	117

== Pitching ==
Brad Radke had a breakout year, going 20–10 with an ERA of 3.87. His string of twelve consecutive wins in twelve consecutive starts had only been matched twice since 1950. Bob Tewksbury and Rich Robertson spent most of the year in the starting rotation, but both had losing records. In the final two spots, LaTroy Hawkins, Scott Aldred, and Frank Rodriguez respectively had 20, 15, and 15 starts. Of these three, Rodriguez was the only one with an ERA under 5. Rick Aguilera had a good year as the team's closer, earning 26 saves in not very many opportunities. Eddie Guardado, Mike Trombley, Greg Swindell, and Todd Ritchie had competent seasons in the bullpen. At the end of the season, Dan Serafini played well in six games, giving some hope for the future.

Team Leaders
Statistic	Player	Quantity
ERA	Brad Radke	3.87
Wins	Brad Radke	20
Saves	Rick Aguilera	26
Strikeouts	Brad Radke	174

== Defense ==
Steinbach played well at catcher, backed up by Greg Myers. Stahoviak played in 81 games at first, with Colbrunn in 64. Knoblauch won a Gold Glove at second base in a season that gave no indication of his future throwing problems. Coomer (third base) and Meares (shortstop) were average at their positions. The three outfielders played well in the field.

== Regular season ==
=== Season standings ===
AL Central
Team	W	L	Pct.	GB	Home	Road
Cleveland Indians	86	75	.534	—	44‍–‍37	42‍–‍38
Chicago White Sox	80	81	.497	6	45‍–‍36	35‍–‍45
Milwaukee Brewers	78	83	.484	8	47‍–‍33	31‍–‍50
Minnesota Twins	68	94	.420	18½	35‍–‍46	33‍–‍48
Kansas City Royals	67	94	.416	19	33‍–‍47	34‍–‍47

=== Record vs. opponents ===
1997 American League record Source: MLB Standings Grid – 1997
Team	ANA	BAL	BOS	CWS	CLE	DET	KC	MIL	MIN	NYY	OAK	SEA	TEX	TOR	NL
Anaheim	—	4–7	6–5	6–5	7–4	5–6	6–5	7–4	4–7	4–7	11–1	6–6	8–4	6–5	4–12
Baltimore	7–4	—	5–7	5–6	6–5	6–6	7–4	5–6	10–1	8–4	8–3	7–4	10–1	6–6	8–7
Boston	5–6	7–5	—	3–8	6–5	5–7	3–8	8–3	8–3	4–8	7–4	7–4	3–8	6–6	6–9
Chicago	5–6	6–5	8–3	—	5–7	4–7	11–1	4–7	6–6	2–9	8–3	5–6	3–8	5–6	8–7
Cleveland	4–7	5–6	5–6	7–5	—	6–5	8–3	8–4	8–4	5–6	7–4	3–8	5–6	6–5	9–6
Detroit	6–5	6–6	7–5	7–4	5–6	—	6–5	4–7	4–7	2–10	7–4	4–7	7–4	6–6	8–7
Kansas City	5–6	4–7	8–3	1–11	3–8	5–6	—	6–6	7–5	3–8	3–8	5–6	6–5	5–6	6–9
Milwaukee	4–7	6–5	3–8	7–4	4–8	7–4	6–6	—	5–7	4–7	5–6	5–6	7–4	7–4	8–7
Minnesota	7–4	1–10	3–8	6–6	4–8	7–4	5–7	7–5	—	3–8	7–4	5–6	3–8	3–8	7–8
New York	7–4	4–8	8–4	9–2	6–5	10–2	8–3	7–4	8–3	—	6–5	4–7	7–4	7–5	5–10
Oakland	1–11	3–8	4–7	3–8	4–7	4–7	8–3	6–5	4–7	5–6	—	5–7	5–7	6–5	7–9
Seattle	6–6	4–7	4–7	6–5	8–3	7–4	6–5	6–5	6–5	7–4	7–5	—	8–4	8–3	7–9
Texas	4–8	1–10	8–3	8–3	6–5	4–7	5–6	4–7	8–3	4–7	7–5	4–8	—	4–7	10–6
Toronto	5–6	6–6	6–6	6–5	5–6	6–6	6–5	4–7	8–3	5–7	5–6	3–8	7–4	—	4–11

=== Roster ===
1997 Minnesota Twins
Roster
Pitchers: 38 Rick Aguilera; 57 Scott Aldred; 52 Shane Bowers; 18 Eddie Guardado; 32 LaTroy Hawkins; 26 Kevin Jarvis; 20 Travis Miller; 31 Dan Naulty; 30 Gregg Olson; 23,22 Brad Radke; 23 Todd Ritchie; 47 Rich Robertson; 33 Frankie Rodriguez; 16 Dan Serafini; 41 Dave Stevens; 17 Greg Swindell; 19 Bob Tewksbury; 21 Mike Trombley	Catchers: 39 Damian Miller; 24 Greg Myers; 36 Terry Steinbach; 26 Javier Valentín; Infielders: 28 Greg Colbrunn; 8 Ron Coomer; 7 Denny Hocking; 11 Chuck Knoblauch; 2 Pat Meares; 4 Paul Molitor; 27 David Ortiz; 37 Scott Stahoviak; 12 Todd Walker	Outfielders: 25 Rich Becker; 51 Brent Brede; 40 Marty Cordova; 15 Darrin Jackson; 5 Roberto Kelly; 59 Chris Latham; 50 Matt Lawton; Other batters: 48 Torii Hunter	Manager: 10 Tom Kelly; Coaches: 46 Terry Crowley (hitting); 35 Ron Gardenhire (third base); 43 Rick Stelmaszek (bullpen); 42 Dick Such (pitching); 45 Scott Ullger

== Notable transactions ==
- January 24: Signed first baseman Greg Colbrunn as a free agent.
- June 3: Drafted future major leaguers Michael Cuddyer (1st round, 9th pick), Matthew LeCroy (1st, 50th), Michael Restovich (2nd round), J. C. Romero (21st round), and Nick Punto (33rd round). (Punto did not sign with the team.)
- July 31: Relief pitcher Dave Stevens claimed off waivers from the Chicago Cubs.
- August 14: Traded Colbrunn to the Atlanta Braves for a player to be named later. On October 1, the Braves sent the Twins minor leaguer Mark Lewis to complete the deal.
- August 20: Traded Roberto Kelly to the Seattle Mariners for players to be named later. On October 9, the Mariners sent the Twins Joe Mays and minor leaguer Jeromy Palki to complete the deal.
- November 18: Catcher Damian Miller and outfielder/first baseman Brent Brede lost to the Arizona Diamondbacks in the expansion draft.
- December 11: Signed outfielder Otis Nixon as a free agent.
- December 12: Traded outfielder Rich Becker to the New York Mets for outfielder Alex Ochoa.
- December 16: Signed pitcher Mike Morgan as a free agent.
- December 23: Signed infielder and Minnesota native Brent Gates as a free agent.
- December 24: Signed pitcher Mike Nakamura as a free agent.

== Player stats ==
=== Batting ===
==== Starters by position ====
Note: Pos = Position; G = Games played; AB = At bats; H = Hits; Avg. = Batting average; HR = Home runs; RBI = Runs batted in

Pos	Player	G	AB	H	Avg.	HR	RBI
C	Terry Steinbach	122	447	111	.248	12	54
1B	Scott Stahoviak	91	275	63	.229	10	33
2B	Chuck Knoblauch	156	611	178	.291	9	58
SS	Pat Meares	134	439	121	.276	10	60
3B	Ron Coomer	140	523	156	.298	13	85
LF	Marty Cordova	103	378	93	.246	15	51
CF	Rich Becker	132	443	117	.264	10	45
RF	Matt Lawton	142	460	114	.248	14	60
DH	Paul Molitor	135	538	164	.305	10	89

==== Other batters ====
Note: G = Games played; AB = At bats; H = Hits; Avg. = Batting average; HR = Home runs; RBI = Runs batted in

Player	G	AB	H	Avg.	HR	RBI
Denny Hocking	115	253	65	.257	2	25
Roberto Kelly	75	247	71	.287	5	37
Greg Colbrunn	70	217	61	.281	5	26
Brent Brede	61	190	52	.274	3	21
Greg Myers	62	165	44	.267	5	28
Todd Walker	52	156	37	.237	3	16
Darrin Jackson	49	130	33	.254	3	21
Damian Miller	25	66	18	.273	2	13
David Ortiz	15	49	16	.327	1	6
Chris Latham	15	22	4	.182	0	1
Javier Valentín	4	7	2	.286	0	0
Torii Hunter	1	0	0	----	0	0

=== Pitching ===
==== Starting pitchers ====
Note: G = Games pitched; IP = Innings pitched; W = Wins; L = Losses; ERA = Earned run average; SO = Strikeouts

Player	G	IP	W	L	ERA	SO
Brad Radke	35	239.2	20	10	3.87	174
Bob Tewksbury	26	168.2	8	13	4.22	92
Rich Robertson	31	147.0	8	12	5.69	69
LaTroy Hawkins	20	103.1	6	12	5.84	58
Scott Aldred	17	77.1	2	10	7.68	33
Dave Stevens	6	23.0	1	3	9.00	16
Shane Bowers	5	19.0	0	3	8.05	7

==== Other pitchers ====
Note: G = Games pitched; IP = Innings pitched; W = Wins; L = Losses; ERA = Earned run average; SO = Strikeouts

Player	G	IP	W	L	ERA	SO
Frank Rodriguez	43	142.1	3	6	4.62	65
Travis Miller	13	48.1	1	5	7.63	26
Dan Serafini	6	26.1	2	1	3.42	15
Kevin Jarvis	6	13.0	0	0	12.46	9

==== Relief pitchers ====
Note: G = Games pitched; W = Wins; L = Losses; SV = Saves; ERA = Earned run average; SO = Strikeouts

Player	G	W	L	SV	ERA	SO
Rick Aguilera	61	5	4	26	3.82	68
Eddie Guardado	69	0	4	1	3.91	54
Mike Trombley	67	2	3	1	4.37	74
Greg Swindell	65	7	4	1	3.58	75
Todd Ritchie	42	2	3	0	4.58	44
Dan Naulty	29	1	1	1	5.87	23
Gregg Olson	11	0	0	0	18.36	6

== Miscellaneous ==
- The highest paid Twin in 1997 was Knoblauch at $6,150,000, followed by Molitor at $3,500,000.
- In recognition of the 50th anniversary of Jackie Robinson breaking MLB's color-line, the Twins wore uniforms of the 1909 St. Paul Colored Gophers at home against Cleveland on July 13, 1997.

== Other post-season awards ==
- Calvin R. Griffith Award (Most Valuable Twin) – Brad Radke
- Joseph W. Haynes Award (Twins Pitcher of the Year) – Brad Radke
- Bill Boni Award (Twins Outstanding Rookie) – none
- Charles O. Johnson Award (Most Improved Twin) – Brad Radke
- Dick Siebert Award (Upper Midwest Player of the Year) – Denny Neagle
  - The above awards are voted on by the Twin Cities chapter of the BBWAA
- Carl R. Pohlad Award (Outstanding Community Service) – Rick Aguilera
- Sherry Robertson Award (Twins Outstanding Farm System Player) – David Ortiz

All-Star Game: The lone representative of the Twins in the All-Star Game was second baseman Chuck Knoblauch. Knoblauch also won the Gold Glove Award and Silver Slugger Award.

Paul Molitor won the Lou Gehrig Award, given annually to a Major League Baseball (MLB) player who best exhibits the character and integrity of Lou Gehrig, both on the field and off.

== Farm system ==
Level	Team	League	Manager
AAA	Salt Lake Buzz	Pacific Coast League	Phil Roof
AA	New Britain Rock Cats	Eastern League	Al Newman
A	Fort Myers Miracle	Florida State League	John Russell
A	Fort Wayne Wizards	Midwest League	Mike Boulanger
Rookie	Elizabethton Twins	Appalachian League	Jose Marzan
Rookie	GCL Twins	Gulf Coast League	Steve Liddle
