= Derek Lowe =

American baseball player (born 1973)

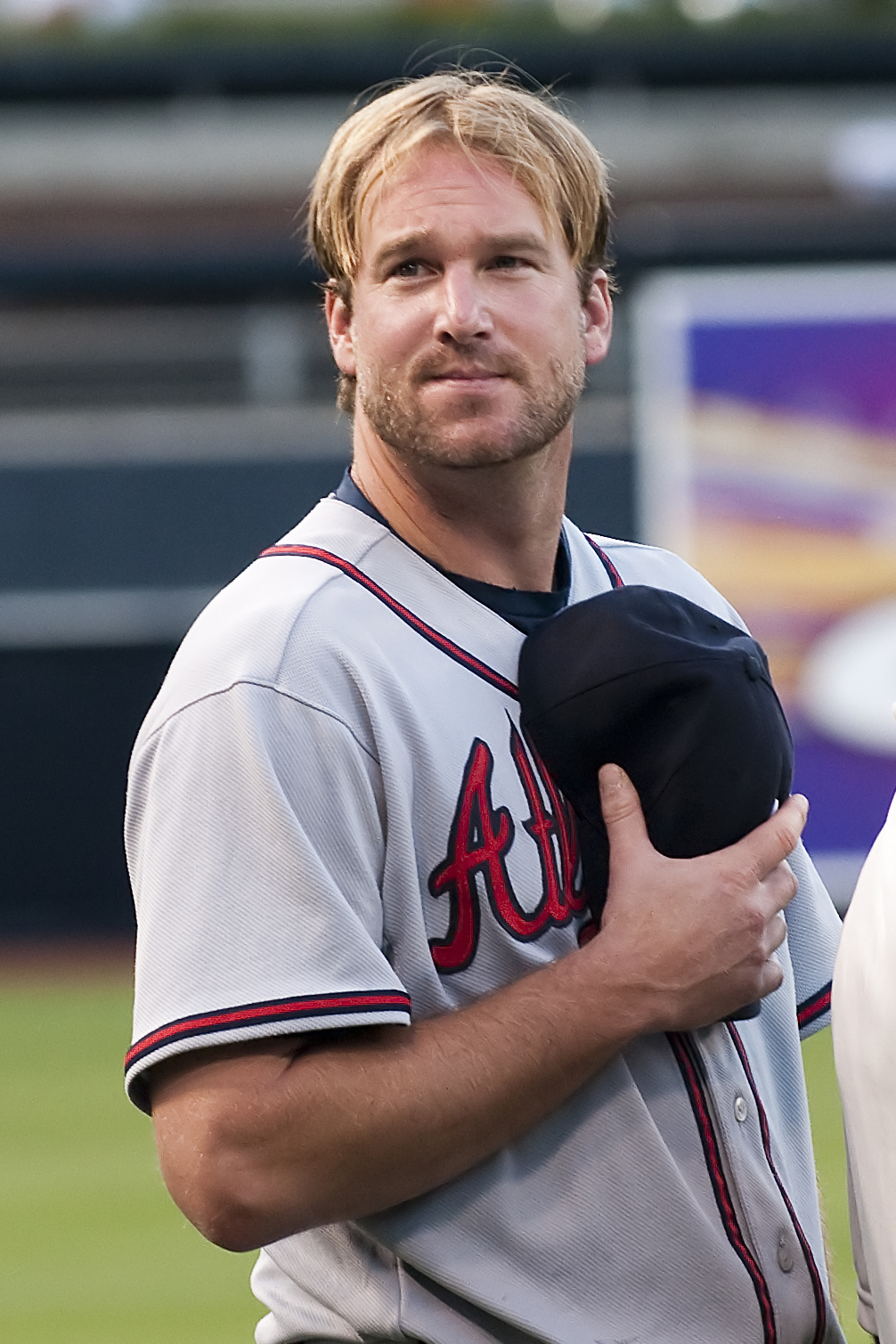
- Lowe with the Atlanta Braves in 2009
- Pitcher
- Born: June 1, 1973 (age 53); Dearborn, Michigan, U.S.
- Batted: Right Threw: Right

MLB debut
- April 26, 1997, for the Seattle Mariners

Last MLB appearance
- May 19, 2013, for the Texas Rangers

MLB statistics
- Win–loss record: 176–157
- Earned run average: 4.03
- Strikeouts: 1,722
- Saves: 86
- Stats at Baseball Reference

Teams
- Seattle Mariners (1997); Boston Red Sox (1997–2004); Los Angeles Dodgers (2005–2008); Atlanta Braves (2009–2011); Cleveland Indians (2012); New York Yankees (2012); Texas Rangers (2013)

Career highlights and awards
- 2× All-Star (2000, 2002); World Series champion (2004); NL wins leader (2006); AL saves leader (2000); Pitched a no-hitter on April 27, 2002; Boston Red Sox Hall of Fame

Derek Christopher Lowe (born June 1, 1973) is an American former professional baseball pitcher. During his career, he played in Major League Baseball (MLB) for the Seattle Mariners, Boston Red Sox, Los Angeles Dodgers, Atlanta Braves, Cleveland Indians, New York Yankees, and Texas Rangers.

Lowe made his MLB debut in 1997 with Seattle. With the Red Sox, he was an All-Star in 2000 and 2002 and threw a no-hitter in 2002. In the 2004 postseason, he had a 3–0 win–loss record as he helped Boston win its first World Series championship in 86 years.

== Early years ==
Lowe attended Edsel Ford High School in Dearborn, Michigan, where he was a four-sport letterman in baseball, golf, soccer, and basketball. He was an All-League honoree in all four sports and was a first-team All-State in basketball. Lowe committed to attend Eastern Michigan University on a basketball scholarship.

== Baseball career ==
=== Seattle Mariners ===
==== Minor leagues ====
The Seattle Mariners drafted Lowe in the eighth round of the 1991 MLB draft. He signed with the Mariners on June 7, 1991, forgoing his college scholarship. The Mariners immediately assigned him to their rookie league team, where he went 5–3 with a 2.41 earned run average (ERA) in 12 starts.

He spent the next several years advancing through the minor leagues, pitching for the Class A Short Season Bellingham Mariners in 1992, Single-A Riverside Pilots in 1993, then spending two years in Double-A, with the Jacksonville Suns in 1994 and Port City Roosters in 1995. He pitched for Port City the Triple-A Tacoma Rainiers in 1996. He was a starting pitcher in the minors. He also pitched in the Arizona Fall League in 1993. Baseball America ranked him as a top 100 prospect in 1993 and 1994.

==== Major leagues ====
Lowe made his major league debut on April 26, 1997, working 3 2/3 innings in relief against the Toronto Blue Jays. He made his first major league start on May 27 against the Minnesota Twins, giving up four runs in five innings. His first career win came on June 6 against the Detroit Tigers, pitching 5 1/3 innings and giving up 3 runs in the Mariners' 6–3 victory.

Seattle, however, was desperate for immediate bullpen help and traded Lowe and catcher Jason Varitek to the Boston Red Sox for reliever Heathcliff Slocumb. The trade on July 31, orchestrated by Mariners' general manager Woody Woodward, is considered one of the worst trades in franchise history.

=== Boston Red Sox ===
Lowe compiled a 5–15 record over his first two seasons, during which he split time starting and relieving, but came into his own in 1999 after being transferred into the closer's role, finishing the season with 15 saves and a 2.63 ERA.

Lowe had his best season as a closer in 2000 when he led the American League (AL) with 42 saves, to go along with a 2.56 ERA. Despite recording 24 saves early in the 2001 season, Lowe lost the closer's job soon after the trading deadline when the Red Sox acquired Ugueth Urbina. Lowe was left in limbo, demoted to various setup jobs in the bullpen. Instead he asked manager Joe Kerrigan to return him to the starting rotation; Kerrigan agreed, and Lowe pitched 16 innings as a starter before the end of the season. The following year, 2002, was Lowe's coming out party as a starter, as he posted a 21–8 record to go with a 2.58 ERA, finishing third in Cy Young Award voting behind Barry Zito and Lowe's teammate Pedro Martínez. Lowe no-hit the Tampa Bay Devil Rays at Fenway Park on April 27 that year, becoming the first pitcher to do so at Fenway Park since Dave Morehead in 1965. Lowe faced just one batter over the minimum in the game; only a third inning walk to Brent Abernathy separated Lowe from a perfect game. Additionally, Lowe was the starting pitcher for the AL in the All-Star Game that year.

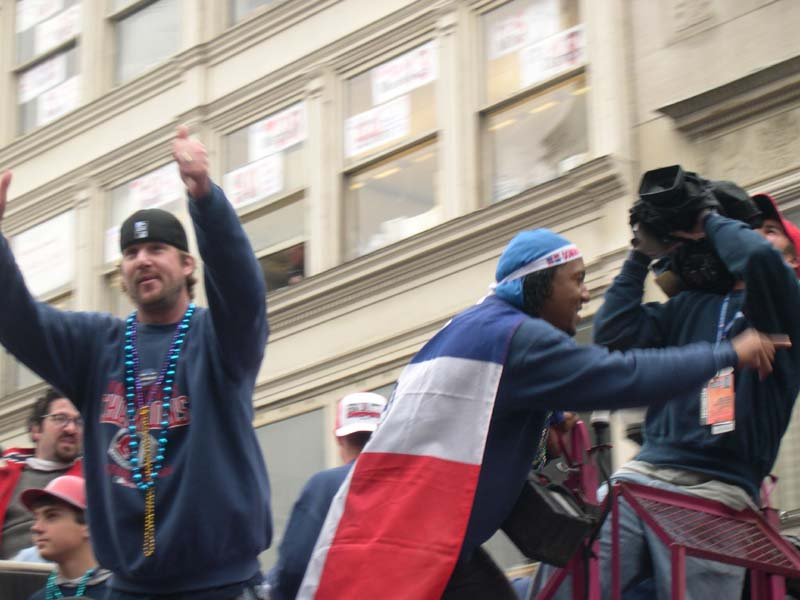
Lowe (left) and Pedro Martínez at the Red Sox World Series Victory Parade in 2004.

Lowe posted a 17–7 record despite a 4.47 ERA in 2003. He recorded an improbable save in the deciding Game 5 of the 2003 AL Division Series (ALDS), entering the game with a one-run lead and Oakland Athletics runners on first and second base with none out. He ended the game with a sacrifice bunt and two strikeouts, allowing one walk.

In 2004, Lowe finished 14–12 with a 5.42 ERA in 33 starts. During the postseason, he rebounded with a 3–0 record and 1.86 ERA in four games, three of them starts. He was the winner in the final game of all three postseason series—the ALDS against the Anaheim Angels (pitching in relief), the AL Championship Series against the New York Yankees, and the World Series against the St. Louis Cardinals. In the World Series, he threw shutout ball for 7 innings in Game 4, to defeat Jason Marquis, as the Red Sox won their first championship in 86 years.

=== Los Angeles Dodgers ===
On January 11, 2005, Lowe signed a four-year, $36 million contract with the Los Angeles Dodgers. Despite his signing with a new team, Lowe wore a Red Sox uniform during the team's World Series ring ceremony on April 11, 2005, after already making a start for the Dodgers.

On August 31, Lowe pitched an unusual one-hitter. After giving up a leadoff single to the Cubs' Jerry Hairston Jr., Lowe did not allow another Chicago hit, picking up a one-hit, two-walk, 7–0 complete game victory while facing only 29 batters.

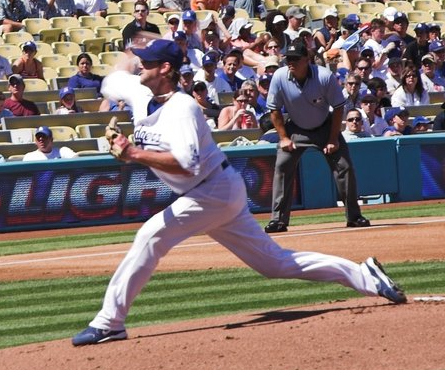
Lowe pitching for the Los Angeles Dodgers in 2006.

Lowe tied for the most wins in the National League (NL) in 2006, with 16.

After being the opening day starter for the Dodgers for the last three years, in 2008 he was moved second in the rotation, behind Brad Penny. Manager Joe Torre chose Lowe to start Game 1 of the NL Championship Series against the Philadelphia Phillies on October 9. Lowe opened the game with five scoreless innings before allowing 3 runs in the sixth inning, taking the loss.

Hall of Famer Greg Maddux was twice traded during a season in his 23-year career, both times to the Dodgers: first in 2006, then in his final season in 2008. Each time Maddux joined the Dodgers, Lowe performed better afterwards. Lowe indicated that Maddux helped him considerably; Maddux was often seen sitting next to him in the dugout, as Lowe was able to learn from the master hurler.

=== Atlanta Braves ===
Lowe agreed to a four-year, $60 million deal with the Atlanta Braves during the 2008–09 offseason. He was named the team's Opening Day starter. Lowe beat the Phillies 4–1 on Opening Night, going 8 innings and giving up just 2 hits and 0 runs.

In 2010, Lowe was one of only two active players, along with Liván Hernández, to have played 12 or more seasons without going on the disabled list.

Despite having a mediocre season until August, Lowe was exceptional in September 2010, with a 5–0 record, a 1.77 ERA, 29 strikeouts while walking only three batters, which helped the Braves secure a playoff berth as the NL Wild Card, one game ahead of the San Diego Padres at the end of the regular season. For this, Lowe was named NL Pitcher of the Month. Lowe lost Games 1 and 4 of the NL Division Series.

On August 31, 2011, Lowe hit his first home run (in 425 at-bats) off John Lannan of the Washington Nationals.

=== Cleveland Indians ===
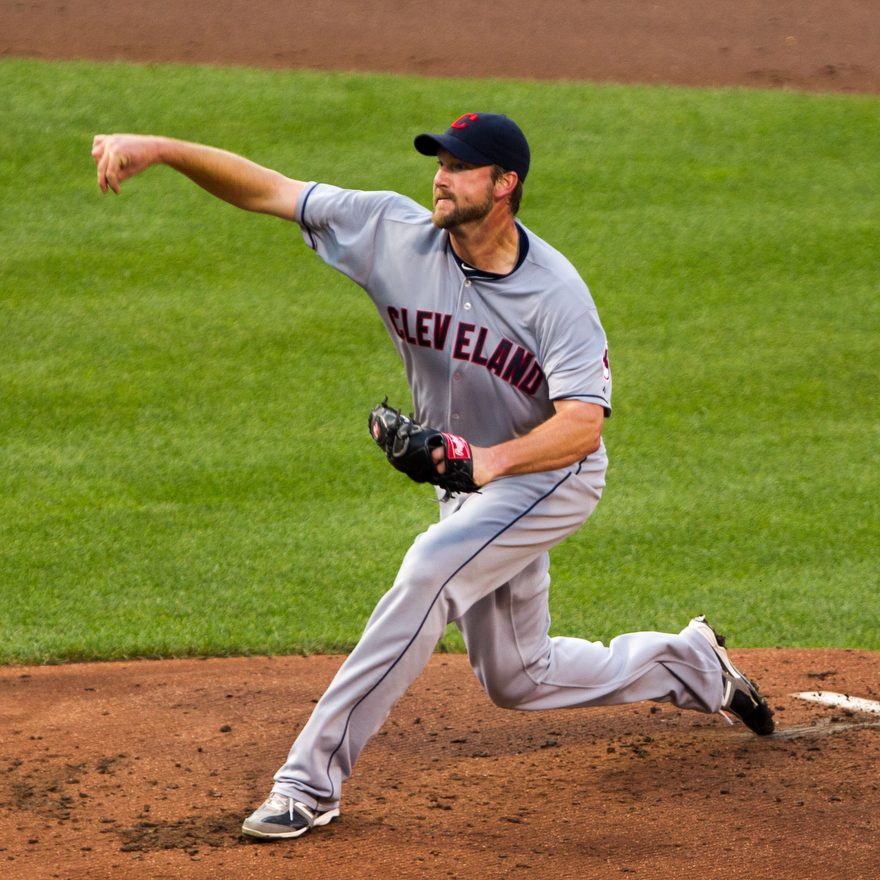
Lowe with Cleveland in 2012

Following the 2011 season, the Braves traded Lowe to the Cleveland Indians for minor league left-handed relief pitcher Chris Jones. The Braves paid $10 million of Lowe's $15 million salary for the 2012 season. On May 15, in a road game versus the Minnesota Twins, Lowe recorded his first shutout in seven years and also pitched a complete game in a 5–0 win, improving his season pitching record to 6–1. Lowe did not record a strikeout in the shutout, becoming the first pitcher to do so since 2002.

The Indians designated Lowe for assignment on August 1 to make room for Corey Kluber. Lowe was 8–10 with a 5.52 ERA in 21 starts and 119 innings pitched. Cleveland released Lowe on August 10.

=== New York Yankees ===
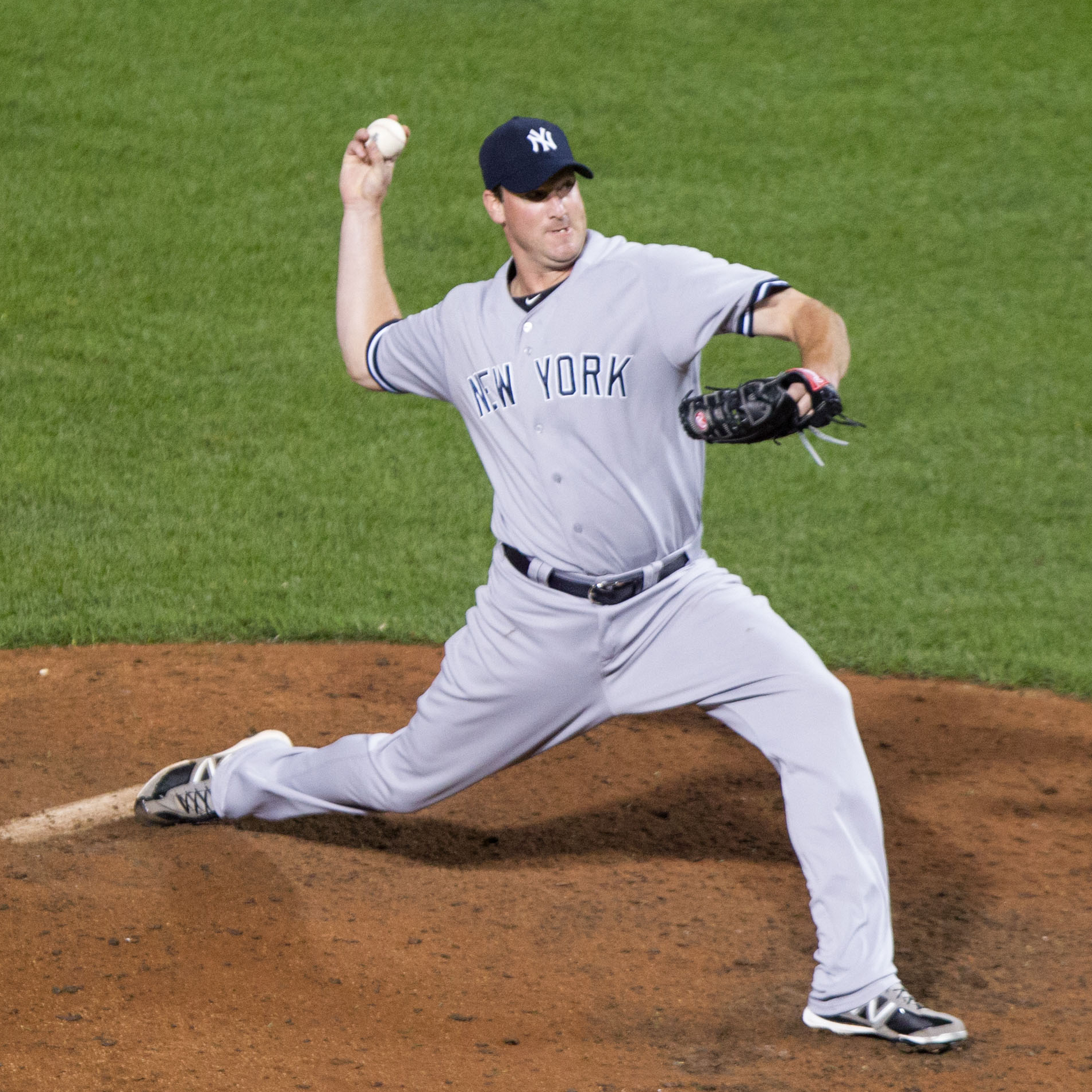
Lowe with the New York Yankees

On August 12, 2012, Lowe signed with the New York Yankees. In his Yankees debut on August 13, he pitched four scoreless innings in relief, recording his first regular season save since 2001. Lowe had a 3.04 ERA in 17 appearances, earning him a spot on the team's postseason roster. The Yankees defeated the Baltimore Orioles in the ALDS but lost to the Detroit Tigers in the ALCS. In his final postseason, Lowe allowed 3 runs in two innings in three relief appearances. He became a free agent after the season ended.

=== Texas Rangers ===
On March 6, 2013, Lowe signed a minor league contract with the Texas Rangers. He made the team's major league roster and was with the Rangers on opening day. He was designated for assignment on May 20.

=== Retirement ===
On June 9, 2013, sportswriter Nick Cafardo reported that Lowe appeared to have retired. According to Cafardo, Lowe told his agent, Scott Boras, not to approach any teams to gauge their interest. Lowe officially announced his retirement July 18.

Lowe was eligible to be elected into the Hall of Fame in 2019 but received no votes, thus dropping off of future ballots.

== Scouting report ==
Lowe was a sinkerball pitcher, throwing the pitch over 60% of the time. He also threw a fastball, curveball, and a slider.

== Personal life ==
Lowe has advocated for various causes to fight cancer. Himself a survivor of squamous cell carcinoma, Lowe has worked with the Melanoma Foundation of New England, the National Council on Skin Cancer Prevention, and the Prostate Cancer Foundation. Lowe was diagnosed with attention deficit disorder and received permission to treat it with Adderall, a substance normally banned by Major League Baseball, but with exceptions allowed on a case-by-case basis.

Lowe was charged with fourth-degree domestic violence by King County police in 1997 after his girlfriend claimed that he struck her. Lowe was released on $1,000 bond the next day, whereupon he allegedly violated a no-contact order by returning to her home shortly thereafter. Lowe entered counseling as a result.

Carolyn Hughes, who covered the Dodgers for Fox Sports West, was suspended pending an investigation into a potential relationship between her and Lowe during his tenure with the Dodgers. Shortly thereafter, Lowe filed for divorce from Trinka Lowe, his wife of seven years. They had three children together. Hughes's husband also filed for divorce. In the aftermath, Hughes ended her broadcasting career, and she and Lowe continued their relationship. They were married on December 13, 2008 at The Henry Ford in Dearborn, Michigan.

On April 28, 2011, Lowe was arrested and charged with driving under the influence, reckless driving, and improper lane change after drag racing down an Atlanta street. The trooper who stopped him detected an odor of alcohol and administered a field sobriety test, which resulted in Lowe's arrest. Lowe declined to take a breath test and was released after posting bail. The driver of the other vehicle was not charged and was released. On May 26, Atlanta Solicitor-General Raines Carter dismissed the DUI and reckless driving charges, and Lowe entered a nolo contendere (no contest) plea to violating basic motor vehicle rules.

Lowe finished second to Mark Mulder in the July 2017 American Century Championship celebrity golf tournament.

Lowe won the January 2022 LPGA Tournament of Champions Celebrity Division tournament, defeating Annika Sörenstam in a playoff after both scored 138 points.

== See also ==
- List of Major League Baseball annual saves leaders
- List of Major League Baseball annual wins leaders
- List of Major League Baseball no-hitters

Awards and achievements
Preceded by Bud Smith	No-hitter pitcher April 27, 2002	Succeeded by Kevin Millwood
Preceded by Roger Clemens	American League All-Star Game Starting Pitcher; 2002	Succeeded by Esteban Loaiza
Preceded by Hideo Nomo	Los Angeles Dodgers Opening Day; Starting pitcher 2005–2007	Succeeded by Brad Penny
