= Mel Rosario =

Dominican baseball player (born 1973)

- Catcher
- Born: May 25, 1973 (age 52); Santo Domingo, Dominican Republic
- Batted: Switch Threw: Right

MLB debut
- September 11, 1997, for the Baltimore Orioles

Last MLB appearance
- September 28, 1997, for the Baltimore Orioles

MLB statistics
- Batting average: .000
- Games played: 4
- At bats: 3
- Stats at Baseball Reference

Teams
- Baltimore Orioles (1997)

Melvin Gregorio Rosario (born May 25, 1973) is a Dominican former Major League Baseball player. Rosario played for the Baltimore Orioles in the 1997 season. In four games, he had no hits in 3 at-bats, with one error at catcher. Rosario was a switch hitter and threw right-handed.

== Career ==
He was signed by the San Diego Padres as an amateur free agent in 1991. He last played professionally in 2006 for the Atlantic City Surf of the Atlantic League.
