= Robinson Checo =

Dominican baseball player (born 1971)

- Pitcher
- Born: September 9, 1971 (age 54); Santiago de los Caballeros, Dominican Republic
- Batted: Right Threw: Right

Professional debut
- CPBL: March 18, 1994, for the China Times Eagles
- NPB: April 12, 1995, for the Hiroshima Toyo Carp
- MLB: September 16, 1997, for the Boston Red Sox

Last appearance
- CPBL: October 13, 1994, for the China Times Eagles
- NPB: June 30, 1996, for the Hiroshima Toyo Carp
- MLB: October 3, 1999, for the Los Angeles Dodgers

CPBL statistics
- Win–loss record: 7–11
- Earned run average: 2.88
- Strikeouts: 122

NPB statistics
- Win–loss record: 19–9
- Earned run average: 3.17
- Strikeouts: 202

MLB statistics
- Win–loss record: 3-5
- Earned run average: 7.61
- Strikeouts: 30
- Stats at Baseball Reference

Teams
- China Times Eagles (1994); Hiroshima Toyo Carp (1995–1996); Boston Red Sox (1997–1998); Los Angeles Dodgers (1999)

Robinson Pérez Checo (born September 9, 1971) is a Dominican former pitcher who played in Major League Baseball from 1997 through 1999. He batted and threw right-handed.

A well-traveled pitcher, Checo never was able to fulfill the potential that he showed in the minor leagues. He played for at least 13 teams in four countries during his 12-year career.

In 1989, Checo pitched for the California Angels organization in the Dominican Summer League. After that, he played for Japan's Hiroshima Toyo Carp minor league system (1990–92) and with the China Times Eagles in the Chinese Professional Baseball League (1993–94), before returning to Hiroshima in 1995. That season, he went 15–8 with 166 strikeouts and a 2.74 ERA with the Toyo Carp and also became the first foreign pitcher to pitch a shutout in his first Central League appearance, over the Hanshin Tigers. He declined in 1996, going 4–1 with a 4.80 ERA in only nine games, but barely missed spinning a no-hitter against Hanshin with two outs in the ninth inning.

Checo joined the Boston Red Sox as a free agent before the 1997 season under a seven-figure contract. Between 1997 and 1998 he played for five Red Sox-system teams, including two trips to the major-league club. A year later, he played for the Detroit, Anaheim and Los Angeles minor league organizations, appearing with the Dodgers late in the season. In 2000, he finished 8–3 with a 3.63 ERA for Triple-A Albuquerque Dukes.

In 16 major league games, Checo posted a 3–5 record with 30 strikeouts and a 7.61 ERA in 32 23 innings. In nine minor league seasons, he went 43–27 with 588 SO and a 3.78 ERA in 109 appearances.
