= Dan Serafini =

American baseball player and convicted murderer (born 1974)

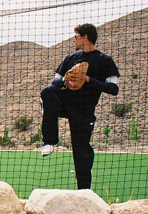
- Pitcher
- Born: January 25, 1974 (age 52); San Francisco, California, U.S.
- Batted: Switch Threw: Left

Professional debut
- MLB: June 25, 1996, for the Minnesota Twins
- CPBL: August 21, 2002, for the Chinatrust Whales
- NPB: April 12, 2004, for the Chiba Lotte Marines

Last appearance
- MLB: August 1, 2007, for the Colorado Rockies
- CPBL: August 29, 2002, for the Chinatrust Whales
- NPB: May 13, 2007, for the Orix Buffaloes

MLB statistics
- Win–loss record: 15–16
- Earned run average: 6.04
- Strikeouts: 127

CPBL statistics
- Win–loss record: 0–2
- Earned run average: 13.50
- Strikeouts: 1

NPB statistics
- Win–loss record: 18–17
- Earned run average: 4.13
- Strikeouts: 217
- Stats at Baseball Reference

Teams
- Minnesota Twins (1996–1998); Chicago Cubs (1999); San Diego Padres (2000); Pittsburgh Pirates (2000); Chinatrust Whales (2002); Cincinnati Reds (2003); Chiba Lotte Marines (2004–2005); Orix Buffaloes (2006–2007); Colorado Rockies (2007)

Daniel Joseph Serafini (born January 25, 1974) is an American former professional baseball relief pitcher and convicted murderer. He played in Major League Baseball (MLB) for the Minnesota Twins, Chicago Cubs, San Diego Padres, Pittsburgh Pirates, Cincinnati Reds, and Colorado Rockies. He also played in the Chinese Professional Baseball League (CPBL) for the Chinatrust Whales and in Nippon Professional Baseball (NPB) for the Chiba Lotte Marines and Orix Buffaloes. He was the 26th overall selection of the 1992 MLB draft by the Twins.

On July 14, 2025, Serafini was found guilty of the first-degree murder of his father-in-law and the attempted murder of his mother-in-law, in a 2021 attack. He was sentenced to life in prison without parole on February 27, 2026.

== Early life ==
Serafini attended Junípero Serra High School. On May 18, 1991, in a 7–0 win over Salinas High School, Serafini pitched a CIF Central Coast Section playoff no-hitter. It remains the only playoff no-hitter in school history.

== Professional career ==
=== Draft and minor leagues ===
Serafini was a first round draft pick in the 1992 Major League Baseball draft when the Minnesota Twins selected him as the 26th overall pick. He was drafted out of Junípero Serra High School.

Serafini began his professional career after signing with the Twins when he played for the rookie league team, the GCL Twins. He played in eight games in 1992 and posted a 1–0 record with a 3.64 ERA. In 1993, Serafini pitched for the Fort Wayne Wizards, the Twins Single-A team. He made 27 starts and posted a 10–8 record with a 3.65 ERA. Serafini played for the Fort Myers Miracle, the Twins High-A team, in 1994. He made 23 starts and had a 9–9 record with a 4.61 ERA. While with the Double-A New Britain Rock Cats in 1995, Serafini was an All-Star in the Eastern League. Overall, while with the Rock Cats, he went 12–9 with a 3.37 ERA. Serafini also made one relief appearance for the Salt Lake Buzz, the Twins' Triple-A affiliate, in 1995.

In 1996, Serafini was rated by Baseball America as the 76th-ranked prospect in the minor leagues.

=== Minnesota Twins (1996–1998) ===
Serafini made his major-league debut on June 25 against the New York Yankees. He started the game and pitched 4.1 innings, allowed five runs, and took the loss. It was Serafini's only major league appearance of the year, as he pitched for the Salt Lake Buzz during the remainder of the 1996 season.

Serafini pitched in the major leagues for the Twins in parts of the 1997 and 1998 seasons.

=== Chicago Cubs (1999) ===
Serafini's contract was purchased by the Chicago Cubs from the Twins on March 31, 1999. He played for the Cubs for the majority of the season, going 3–2 with a 6.93 ERA in 42 games (four starts). On April 18, 1999, Serafini picked up his one and only MLB save in an extra inning victory over the Brewers. That year, Serafini also made two starts for the Iowa Cubs, the Cubs' Triple-A team.

=== San Diego Padres (2000) ===
In the 1999 offseason, on December 22, Serafini was traded to the San Diego Padres for minor league outfielder Brandon Pernell. He pitched in three games for the Padres and recorded an 18.00 ERA. Serafini also played for the Triple-A Las Vegas 51s, for whom he had a 6.88 ERA in 26 games (4 starts).

=== Pittsburgh Pirates (2000) ===
Serafini was traded to the Pittsburgh Pirates for minor-league pitcher Andy Bausher on June 28, 2000, and was assigned to Triple-A Nashville. He made seven starts for the Nashville Sounds, in which he went 4–3 with a 2.68 ERA. Serafini's performance earned him a callup to the Pirates. He pitched in the rotation from August 5 until the end of the season, making 11 starts, in which he went 2–5 with a 4.91 ERA. Serafini was released by the Pirates during the following spring training, on March 20, 2001.

=== Mid-career ===
Serafini did not play in the major leagues during the 2001 or 2002 seasons.

He was signed to a minor league contract by the San Francisco Giants on March 27, 2001. Serafini began the year with the Triple-A Fresno Grizzlies, but was released on April 24. He was then signed to a minor league contract on May 8 by the New York Mets. Serafini played for the Triple-A Norfolk Tides before being released on August 5. He signed another minor league contract two days later, this time with the Milwaukee Brewers. Serafini played for the Triple-A Indianapolis Indians for the rest of the 2001 season, and was granted free agency on October 15.

Serafini signed with the Anaheim Angels on November 3, 2001, but was released on March 28, 2002, before the season began. In August, he briefly pitched for the Chinatrust Whales, a team in the Chinese Professional Baseball League in Taiwan. He signed with the St. Louis Cardinals on November 14, 2002.

Serafini began the 2003 season for the Triple-A Memphis Redbirds but was released on April 21, 2003, after going 0–1 with a 9.00 ERA in three games (two starts). He then went to play in the Mexican League.

=== Cincinnati Reds (2003) ===
Serafini's contract was purchased by the Cincinnati Reds on August 25, 2003 from the Mexican League. He played in his first major-league game since 2000 when he started a game for the Reds on August 26 against the Milwaukee Brewers. After four starts in which he went 0–3 with a 6.27 ERA, he was put into the bullpen for the remainder of the 2003 season. He went 1–3 with a 5.40 ERA in 10 games for the Reds in 2003. Following the season, he was granted free agency on October 4.

=== Nippon Professional Baseball (2004–2007) ===
From 2004 to 2007, Serafini pitched in Nippon Professional Baseball in Japan. He played for the Chiba Lotte Marines in 2004 and 2005, and the Orix Buffaloes in 2006 and 2007.

=== Colorado Rockies (2007) ===
Serafini returned to major league baseball in the United States on July 31, 2007, when he signed a minor league contract with the Colorado Rockies. He was assigned to the Triple-A Colorado Springs Sky Sox. Serafini appeared in 11 games (three starts) for the Sky Sox, finishing 0–1 with a 3.48 ERA. On September 4, 2007, after rosters had expanded, his contract was purchased by the major league club. The next day, Serafini appeared in his first major league game since 2003, when he came in to pitch against the San Francisco Giants. He was used as a left-handed specialist for the Rockies. Serafini pitched in just three games in his callup and had a 54.00 ERA in 1/3 innings. He became a free agent after the 2007 season.

On November 27, 2007, Major League Baseball suspended Serafini 50 games for testing positive for a performance-enhancing substance in violation of the league's joint drug prevention and treatment program. Serafini blamed the suspension on taking the substances in Japan for medical reasons as prescribed by Japanese doctors, and stated that he had stopped taking them when he entered the US.

=== Late career ===
Serafini spent the 2008 and 2009 seasons with the Sultanes de Monterrey in the Mexican League.

In 2010, Serafini played for the Cañeros de Los Mochis in the Mexican Pacific League, the Bridgeport Bluefish of the Atlantic League, and then appeared for Mexico in the February 2011 Caribbean Series.

In 2012, Serafini began the season with the Mexican League, then ended up with the Bridgeport Bluefish of the Atlantic League. With the Bluefish he started 13 games and compiled a 4.02 ERA and 5–3 record. His last game was on August 26, 2012, vs the Sugar Land Skeeters—the day after Roger Clemens' notorious start with the same team. Although still on the Bluefish roster, Perry Miles, the voice of the Bluefish, suggested that was Serafini's last appearance of the season.

Serafini then went back to the Mexican League, signing with the Naranjeros de Hermosillo on November 23, 2012.

== Personal life ==
Circa 2011, Serafini owned the Throw Like a Pro Baseball Academy in Sparks, Nevada. Serafini and his wife, Erin Spohr Serafini, also owned a bar in Sparks called The Oak Tavern (formerly named The Bullpen Bar), which was featured on an episode of Bar Rescue that aired on June 28, 2015.

=== Conviction for 2021 murder ===
On June 5, 2021, Serafini's in-laws, Robert Gary Spohr and Wendy Louise Wood, were shot by an intruder. Spohr died at the scene; his wife of 45 years was badly injured but survived. One year later, while still recovering from her injuries, she died by suicide.

On October 20, 2023, Serafini was charged with the murder of his father-in-law and attempted murder of his mother-in-law. He was also charged with burglary and child endangerment. Also charged in the murder plot was Samantha Scott; she is described both as a close friend of both Serafini and his wife, and also as their former nanny.

A possible motive for the alleged crime may have been money. Serafini made upwards of $14 million in his baseball career, but after a contentious divorce, bad investments, and a failed business, he was apparently $300,000 in debt.

In February 2025, Scott pled guilty to being an accessory after the fact. She was released until sentencing, still facing up to three years in prison.

On July 14, 2025, Serafini was found guilty of first-degree murder, attempted murder, and first-degree burglary. Jurors found other evidence to be true, including discharge of a firearm to cause great bodily injury, lying in wait, and that the attack was willful, deliberate, and premeditated. Serafini filed a motion for a new trial on August 19, 2025. That motion was denied on February 20, 2026. On February 27, 2026, Serafini was sentenced to life in prison without parole.
