= Kerry Lacy =

American baseball player (born 1972)

- Pitcher
- Born: August 7, 1972 (age 53); Chattanooga, Tennessee, U.S.
- Batted: Right Threw: Right

MLB debut
- August 16, 1996, for the Boston Red Sox

Last MLB appearance
- August 21, 1997, for the Boston Red Sox

MLB statistics
- Win–loss record: 3–1
- Earned run average: 5.59
- Strikeouts: 27
- Stats at Baseball Reference

Teams
- Boston Red Sox (1996–1997)

Kerry Ardeen Lacy (born August 7, 1972) is an American former relief pitcher in Major League Baseball who played from 1996 through 1997 for the Boston Red Sox. Listed at 6 ft 2 in (1.88 m), 195 lb., he batted and threw right-handed.

In a two-season career, Lacy posted a 3–1 record with a 5.59 ERA and three saves in 44 appearances, including 27 strikeouts, 15 games finished, and 56.1 innings of work. All 3 of Lacy's saves came in 1997.
