= Shane Bowers (baseball) =

American baseball player (born 1971)

- Pitcher
- Born: July 27, 1971 (age 54); Glendora, California, U.S.
- Batted: Right Threw: Right

MLB debut
- July 26, 1997, for the Minnesota Twins

Last MLB appearance
- August 16, 1997, for the Minnesota Twins

MLB statistics
- Win–loss record: 0–3
- Earned run average: 8.05
- Strikeouts: 7

NPB statistics
- Win–loss record: 7–21
- Earned run average: 4.08
- Strikeouts: 185

KBO statistics
- Win–loss record: 13–4
- Earned run average: 3.01
- Strikeouts: 85
- Stats at Baseball Reference

Teams
- Minnesota Twins (1997); Yokohama BayStars (2001–2002); Hyundai Unicorns (2003)

Shane Patrick Bowers (born July 27, 1971) is an American former professional baseball pitcher. He played in Major League Baseball (MLB) for the Minnesota Twins in 1997, in Nippon Professional Baseball for the Yokohama BayStars from 2001 to 2002, and in Korea Professional Baseball for the Hyundai Unicorns in 2003.

Born in Glendora, California, Bowers went to Charter Oak High School in Covina, where he played baseball and basketball, before attending Loyola Marymount University. After being selected by the Twins in the 1993 Major League Baseball draft, Bowers pitched for four different minor league teams from 1993 to 1996. In 1997, he played for the New Britain Rock Cats for two months, recording a 7–2 win–loss record and 3.41 earned run average (ERA) before receiving a promotion to the Salt Lake Buzz, the Twins' Triple-A team. He went 6–0 with the Buzz, earning a call-up to the major leagues by the Twins. His first major league appearance came on July 26 against the Baltimore Orioles; Bowers allowed one run in 5 2/3 innings pitched. He started five games for Minnesota in 1997 and posted an 0–3 record, with an 8.05 ERA. Bowers returned to the Buzz for the 1998 season, splitting time between starts and relief appearances and pitching through a fracture in his pitching arm.

In 2001, he went overseas to play for the Yokohama BayStars of Japan's Central League; he started 26 games, going 3–13 with a 4.39 ERA. The following season, he was 4–8 with a 3.77 ERA in 24 appearances. In 2003, he pitched for the Hyundai Unicorns in South Korea, winning 13 games. Bowers last played in the minor leagues in 2004.
