= Jim Corsi (baseball) =

American baseball player (1961–2022)

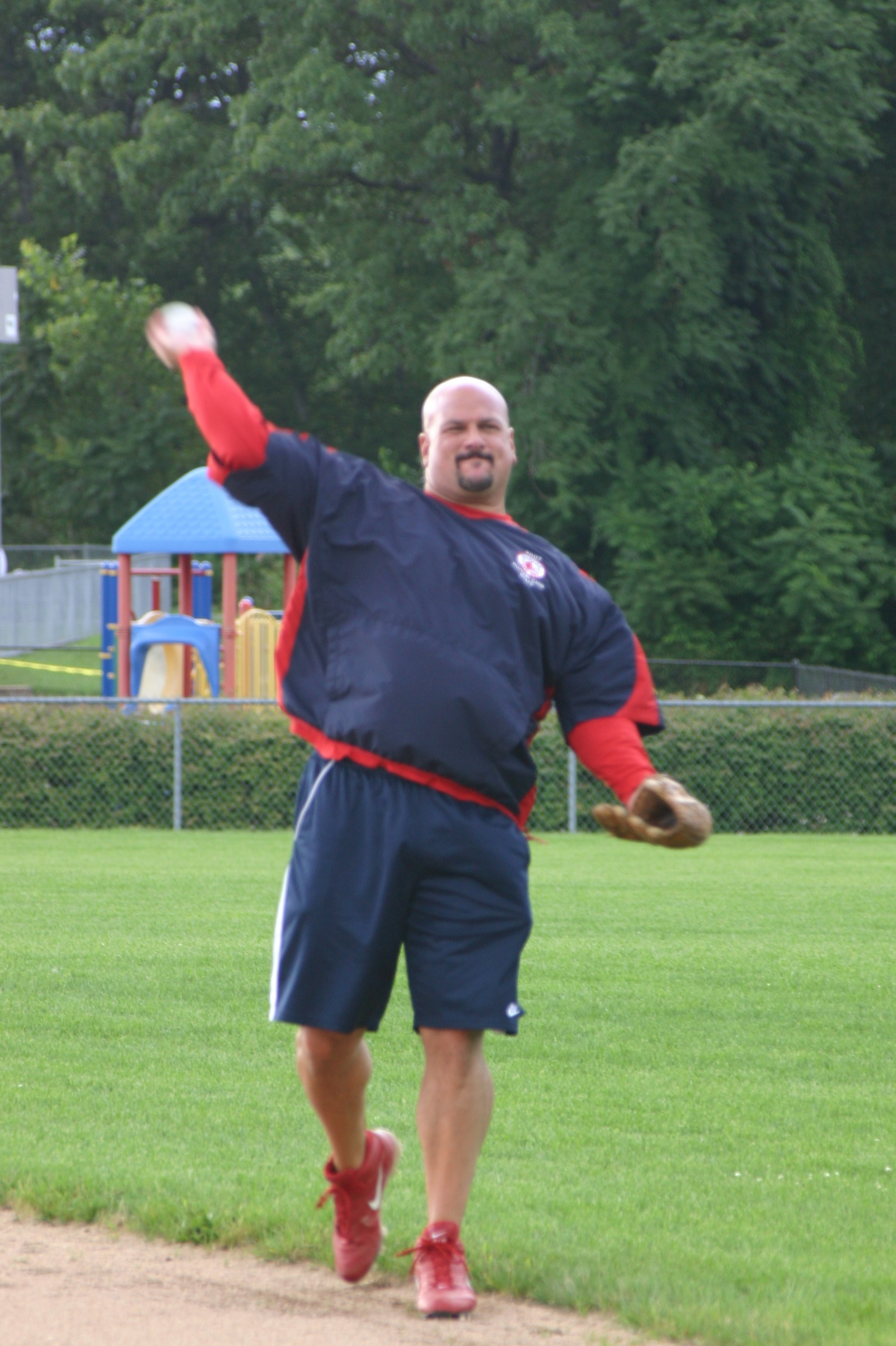
- Corsi in 2008
- Pitcher
- Born: September 9, 1961; Newton, Massachusetts, U.S.
- Died: January 4, 2022 (aged 60); Bellingham, Massachusetts, U.S.
- Batted: Right Threw: Right

MLB debut
- June 28, 1988, for the Oakland Athletics

Last MLB appearance
- October 3, 1999, for the Baltimore Orioles

MLB statistics
- Win–loss record: 22–24
- Earned run average: 3.25
- Strikeouts: 290
- Stats at Baseball Reference

Teams
- Oakland Athletics (1988–1989); Houston Astros (1991); Oakland Athletics (1992); Florida Marlins (1993); Oakland Athletics (1995–1996); Boston Red Sox (1997–1999); Baltimore Orioles (1999)

James Bernard Corsi (September 9, 1961 – January 4, 2022) was an American baseball pitcher who played ten seasons in Major League Baseball (MLB). He played for the Oakland Athletics, Houston Astros, Florida Marlins, Boston Red Sox, and Baltimore Orioles from 1988 to 1999.

== Early life ==
Corsi was born in Newton, Massachusetts, on September 9, 1961. His parents, Ben and Dotty Corsi, had three sons James, Michael, John and two daughters Cynthia and Natalie. He attended Newton North High School, before studying at Saint Leo University in Florida. He was subsequently drafted by the New York Yankees in the 25th round of the 1982 Major League Baseball draft.

== Professional career ==
Corsi played six seasons in the minor leagues from 1982 to 1988, missing the entire 1984 season after being released by the Yankees organization. He made his MLB debut with the Oakland Athletics on June 28, 1988, at the age of 26, pitching a scoreless ninth inning and striking out one in a 4–1 loss to the Milwaukee Brewers. He also made the only start of his major league career on August 7 that year, receiving a no decision after surrendering six earned runs over five innings against the Seattle Mariners. He subsequently posted a 1.88 earned run average (ERA) and 21 strikeouts over 38 1/3 innings pitched in 1989. The Athletics went on to win the World Series that year, but Corsi did not pitch in the postseason. After missing the entire 1990 season, he became a free agent and signed with the Houston Astros on March 19, 1991.

In his only season with the Astros, Corsi compiled a 0–5 win–loss record along with a 3.71 ERA and a career-high 53 strikeouts over 77 2/3 innings. After being released by the organization at the end of the season, he rejoined the Athletics in March 1992. He recorded a career-best 1.43 ERA over 44 innings pitched that year, and pitched in the 1992 American League Championship Series. Corsi was subsequently selected by the Florida Marlins in the expansion draft at the end of the year. He was limited to 15 games in 1993, while his ERA ballooned to 6.64. After the 1994 strike, he once more signed with the Athletics. He then lowered his ERA to 2.20 and had 26 strikeouts in 45 innings. Corsi's playing time increased to 73 2/3 innings in 1997, in which he finished with a 6–0 record, a 4.03 ERA, and 43 strikeouts.

Corsi played his final major league game on October 3, 1999, at the age of 38. In 10 seasons pitching in MLB, Corsi had a 22–24 win–loss record in 368 games pitched, all but one in relief. He had a 3.25 earned run average (ERA), striking out 290 batters in 481 1/3 innings pitched, and recorded seven saves.

== Later life ==
After retiring from professional baseball, Corsi worked as a studio analyst for Boston Red Sox coverage on both the New England Sports Network and UPN 38 baseball coverage from 2002 to 2005. He also ran a construction business in Massachusetts with his brothers. He was inducted to his college alma mater's athletic hall of fame in 2003. Corsi has four children, three with his first wife Diane, and the fourth with his ex-partner Jill Doherty.

In January 2022, Corsi announced he had been diagnosed with stage four cancer of the liver and colon. He died on the morning of January 4, 2022, at his home in Bellingham, Massachusetts. He was 60 years old.
