= Mike Holtz =

American baseball player (born 1972)

- Pitcher
- Born: October 10, 1972 (age 53); Arlington, Virginia, U.S.
- Batted: Left Threw: Left

MLB debut
- August 11, 1996, for the California Angels

Last MLB appearance
- May 16, 2006, for the Boston Red Sox

MLB statistics
- Win–loss record: 16–20
- Earned run average: 4.76
- Strikeouts: 223
- Stats at Baseball Reference

Teams
- California / Anaheim Angels (1996–2001); Oakland Athletics (2002); San Diego Padres (2002); Yokohama BayStars (2005); Boston Red Sox (2006)

Michael James Holtz (born October 10, 1972) is an American former professional baseball relief pitcher and left-handed specialist. He played in Major League Baseball (MLB) for the California / Anaheim Angels, Oakland Athletics, San Diego Padres, and Boston Red Sox.

== Professional career ==
On June 2, 1994, Holtz was drafted by the California Angels in the 17th round of the 1994 Major League Baseball draft. In 1997, he was named to the Topps All-Star Rookie Team along with fellow Angel teammate Jason Dickson.

In an eight-season career, Holtz posted a 16–19 record with a 4.76 ERA and three saves in 353 relief appearances.

Following the bulk of his MLB career, Holtz played for the Yokohama BayStars of the Japanese Central League in 2005 and had a 0–1 mark with 4.38 ERA and 22 strikeouts in 24 2/3 innings of work. He came back to the majors to pitch in three games for the Red Sox in 2006.
