= Michael Coleman (baseball) =

American baseball player (born 1975)

- Outfielder
- Born: August 16, 1975 (age 50); Nashville, Tennessee, U.S.
- Batted: Right Threw: Right

MLB debut
- September 1, 1997, for the Boston Red Sox

Last MLB appearance
- May 16, 2001, for the New York Yankees

MLB statistics
- Batting average: .194
- Home runs: 1
- Runs batted in: 7
- Stats at Baseball Reference

Teams
- Boston Red Sox (1997, 1999); New York Yankees (2001)

Michael Donnell Coleman (born August 16, 1975) is an American former professional baseball player. He played as a backup outfielder in Major League Baseball for the Boston Red Sox (1997, 1999) and New York Yankees (2001). He batted and threw right-handed.

== Early life ==
Coleman was a two-sport star at Stratford High School in Nashville, Tennessee, lettering in both baseball and football. He turned down a football scholarship to the University of Alabama to play baseball professionally.

Coleman has a Sports Training Academy in Nashville, Tennessee called M3 Baseball.

== Professional career ==
Coleman was drafted by the Boston Red Sox in the 18th round of the 1994 amateur draft. He first appearance for Boston came in September 1997, where he would go on to play eight games and post a .167 batting average with two runs batted in and no home runs.

He did not appear in 1998, but was again called up in 1999, where he played in only two games, amassing one hit in five at bats.

During the fall offseason in 2000, he was traded along with Donnie Sadler to the Cincinnati Reds for Chris Stynes. He was traded yet again that offseason to the New York Yankees in the deal that brought Wily Mo Pena to Cincinnati.

In 2001, Coleman appeared in 12 games for New York, where he would hit two home runs. He posted seven runs batted in and a .211 batting average during his time in New York, and was granted free agency following the 2001 season.

Coleman never again appeared in the major leagues, and since the 2001 season, he has played in the minor league systems of the Boston Red Sox, Cincinnati Reds, Washington Nationals, New York Yankees and Tampa Bay Rays. Following the 2006 season, Coleman was granted free agency and has yet to sign with another team.
