= Ricky Trlicek =

American baseball player (born 1969)

- Pitcher
- Born: April 26, 1969 (age 56); Houston, Texas, U.S.
- Batted: Right Threw: Right

MLB debut
- April 8, 1992, for the Toronto Blue Jays

Last MLB appearance
- June 11, 1997, for the New York Mets

MLB statistics
- Win–loss record: 5–8
- Earned run average: 5.23
- Strikeouts: 66
- Stats at Baseball Reference

Teams
- Toronto Blue Jays (1992); Los Angeles Dodgers (1993); Boston Red Sox (1994); New York Mets (1996); Boston Red Sox (1997); New York Mets (1997)

Richard Alan Trlicek (/ˈtrɪlɪtʃɛk/ TRIL-i-chek; born April 26, 1969) is an American former Major League Baseball right-handed pitcher. He was selected in the 4th round by the Philadelphia Phillies in the 1987 MLB draft.

== Career ==
=== Philadelphia Phillies ===
Trlicek signed with the Phillies on June 18, 1987, and was sent to the Utica Blue Sox of the New York–Penn League. Trlicek posted a 2–5 record with a 4.10 ERA in 10 games, eight of them starts.

The Phillies returned Trlicek to the New York–Penn League in the 1988 season, this time to the Batavia Clippers, where in 8 starts, Trlicek had a 2–3 record with a 7.36 ERA. After a poor spring training in 1989, the Phillies released Trlicek on March 23, 1989.

=== Atlanta Braves ===
Trlicek signed as a free agent on April 2, 1989, with the Atlanta Braves, spending most of the season with the Sumter Braves of the South Atlantic League, where in 16 starts, he had a 6–5 record and a 2.48 ERA. Trlicek also made a start with the Durham Bulls of the Carolina League, allowing just a run in eight innings to earn the win.

This was his only season in the Braves organization, as on December 17, 1989, Atlanta sent Trlicek to the Toronto Blue Jays for Ernie Whitt and Kevin Batiste.

=== Toronto Blue Jays ===
Trlicek spent 1990 with the Dunedin Blue Jays of the Florida State League, with whom he had a 5–8 record with a 3.73 ERA in 26 starts. In 1991, the Blue Jays moved Trlicek to the bullpen, and he was promoted to the Knoxville Blue Jays of the Southern League. Trlicek appeared in 41 games, going 2-5 with a 2.45 ERA.

Trlicek had a very solid spring training in 1992, and started the season with the Toronto Blue Jays, working as a middle reliever. He made his major league debut on April 8, 1992, at Tiger Stadium, and pitched 2/3 of an inning, allowing two runs in a 10–9 victory over the Detroit Tigers. He then pitched a scoreless inning against the New York Yankees at SkyDome in Toronto on April 14, however, he was sent to the Syracuse Chiefs of the International League for the remainder of the season after that appearance. In Syracuse, Trlicek had a 1–1 record with a 4.40 ERA in 35 games.

He began spring training in 1993 with the Blue Jays, however, on March 16, 1993, the Los Angeles Dodgers selected Trlicek off of waivers.

=== Los Angeles Dodgers ===
The 1993 was Trlicek's first full season in the major leagues, as he appeared in 41 games with the Los Angeles Dodgers, posting a 1–2 record with a 4.08 ERA. Trlicek won his first major league game on September 9 against the Florida Marlins at Dodger Stadium, as he pitched a scoreless 10th inning before the Dodgers won the game in the bottom of the inning.

Trlicek spent spring training in 1994 with the Dodgers, however he was placed on waivers and on April 1, 1994, the Boston Red Sox selected him.

=== Boston Red Sox ===
Trlicek opened the season with the Boston Red Sox, and earned his first win with the team in his first game, as he threw 1.2 scoreless innings in the Red Sox 5-4 win over the Detroit Tigers at Fenway Park. Trlicek struggled after that game though, as he was sent to the Pawtucket Red Sox with a 17.18 ERA in six games. Trlicek returned to Boston in June, however, he was demoted to the minors once again in early July. Boston then had Trlicek start with the New Britain Red Sox. In New Britain, Trlicek had a 0–1 record with a 0.73 ERA in six starts, before being recalled to Boston.

Trlicek made his first major league start on August 8, 1994, pitching 5.2 innings, allowing two earned runs in a 5–2 loss to the Minnesota Twins at the Hubert H. Humphrey Metrodome. As the 1994 Baseball Strike began, the Red Sox moved Trlicek to Pawtucket for the remainder of the year. He finished the season with a 1–1 record and an 8.06 ERA with Boston, and a 2–1 record with a 2.63 ERA in Pawtucket.

The Red Sox released Trlicek on December 8, making him a free agent.

=== Later career ===
On January 27, 1995, the San Francisco Giants signed Trlicek, and sent him to the Phoenix Firebirds as a reliever. Trlicek played in 38 games with Phoenix, having a 5–4 record with a 5.29 ERA. On July 18, 1995, the Giants released Trlicek. On July 28, the Cleveland Indians signed Trlicek to a minor league contract, sending him to the Canton–Akron Indians of the Eastern League. Trlicek appeared in 24 games, all in relief, posting a 5–3 record with a 3.05 ERA and three saves. The Indians elected not to resign Trlicek and he became a free agent on October 16. On November 30, Trlicek signed with the Detroit Tigers. He spent spring training in 1996 with the Tigers, however, Detroit released Trlicek on March 27, 1996.

The next day, on March 28, 1996, the New York Mets signed Trlicek and sent him to the Norfolk Tides of the International League. Trlicek had a very solid season in Norfolk, as he had a 4–5 record with a 1.87 ERA, along with ten saves. He earned a September call-up to the Mets, and in five games with New York, he had a 0–1 record with a 3.38.

After the season, on October 14, 1996, the Boston Red Sox selected Trlicek off of waivers. Trlicek began the season at the major league level with the Red Sox. He appeared in 18 games with the Red Sox, posting a 3–4 record with a 4.63 ERA. The Red Sox then sent Trlicek back to the Mets for Toby Borland.

Trlicek appeared in only eight games with the Mets, as he had a 0–0 record with an 8.00 in New York before an arm injury ended his season. He signed with the Mets for the 1998 season, however, he spent the year with the Norfolk Tides, going 2-2 with a 6.08 ERA in 19 games.

Trlicek announced his retirement from playing at the end of the season.
