= Rich Robertson (left-handed pitcher) =

American baseball player (born 1968)

- Pitcher
- Born: September 15, 1968 (age 57); Nacogdoches, Texas, U.S.
- Batted: Left Threw: Left

MLB debut
- April 30, 1993, for the Pittsburgh Pirates

Last MLB appearance
- May 3, 1998, for the Anaheim Angels

MLB statistics
- Win–loss record: 17–30
- Earned run average: 5.40
- Strikeouts: 237
- Stats at Baseball Reference

Teams
- Pittsburgh Pirates (1993–1994); Minnesota Twins (1995–1997); Anaheim Angels (1998)

Richard Wayne Robertson (born September 15, 1968) is an American former professional baseball pitcher. He played during six seasons in Major League Baseball (MLB) for the Pittsburgh Pirates, Minnesota Twins, and Anaheim Angels.

== Career ==
Robertson was drafted by the Pirates in the 9th round of the 1990 Major League Baseball draft. Robertson played his first professional season with their Class A (Short Season) Welland Pirates in 1990, and his last with the Colorado Rockies' Double-A Carolina Mudcats and the Triple-A units of the Texas Rangers (Oklahoma RedHawks), Pittsburgh Pirates (Nashville Sounds), and Cincinnati Reds (Indianapolis Indians) in 1999.
