= Jason Dickson =

Canadian-born baseball pitcher (born 1973)

- Pitcher
- Born: March 30, 1973 (age 53); London, Ontario, Canada
- Batted: Left Threw: Right

MLB debut
- August 21, 1996, for the California Angels

Last MLB appearance
- May 14, 2000, for the Anaheim Angels

MLB statistics
- Win–loss record: 26–25
- Earned run average: 4.99
- Strikeouts: 214
- Stats at Baseball Reference

Teams
- California / Anaheim Angels (1996–1998, 2000)

Career highlights and awards
- All-Star (1997)
Medals
Men's baseball
Representing Canada
World Junior Baseball Championship
Gold medal – first place	1991 Brandon	Team

Jason Royce Dickson (born March 30, 1973) is a Canadian former professional baseball pitcher.

Dickson is a graduate of Northeastern Oklahoma A&M College. He played for the Somerset Patriots and was drafted by the California Angels in the 6th round of the 1994 MLB Amateur Draft. He was part of Team Canada in the 2004 Summer Olympics which finished in fourth place.

Called up to the California Angels squad on August 21, 1996, the first batter he faced was Derek Jeter, who homered off Dickson's third Major League pitch. Dickson was named to the 1997 Major League Baseball All-Star Game as a 24-year-old representing the Anaheim Angels. He finished his first full season with 13 wins and a 4.29 ERA but struggled the next year, going 10–10 with a 6.05 ERA. Over four seasons in the majors, Dickson had a 26–25 record and 4.99 career ERA. However, injuries all but nullified his once promising career. In 1996, he won the Canadian Baseball Hall of Fame's Tip O'Neill Award.

Raised in Miramichi, New Brunswick, Dickson has been a supporter of the New Brunswick Liberals and campaigned for them in the 2003 election. It was reported in the March 7, 2006 Times & Transcript where he was considering running for the Liberals in the next provincial election. He ran for and lost the right to run for the Liberals in the riding of Miramichi-Bay du Vin at a May 28, 2006 nominating convention placing third in a field of four candidates with 91 of 531 total votes.

He is now a pitcher for the Chatham Ironmen of the New Brunswick Senior Baseball League. On June 22, 2016, he was acclaimed as Baseball Canada President at the organization's Annual General Meeting in Toronto.

== See also ==
- List of Major League Baseball players from Canada
