= 1997 Kansas City Royals season =

1997 Kansas City Royals
- League: American League
- Division: Central
- Ballpark: Kauffman Stadium
- City: Kansas City, Missouri
- Record: 67–94 (.416)
- Divisional place: 5th
- Owners: David Glass
- General managers: Herk Robinson
- Managers: Bob Boone and Tony Muser
- Television: KMBC-TV; KCWB; Fox Sports Rocky Mountain (Paul Splittorff, Bob Davis)
- Radio: WIBW (AM) (Denny Matthews, Fred White, John Wathan, Paul Splittorff)

The 1997 Kansas City Royals season was the 29th season for the franchise, and their 25th at Kauffman Stadium. The Royals finished fifth in the American League Central with a record of 67 wins and 94 losses and missed the postseason for the 12th consecutive season.

== Offseason ==
- October 28, 1996: Mike Bovee and Mark Gubicza were traded by the Royals to the Anaheim Angels for Chili Davis.
- December 13, 1996: Jeff Granger, Joe Randa, Jeff Wallace, and Jeff Martin (minors) were traded by the Royals to the Pittsburgh Pirates for Jay Bell and Jeff King.
- December 16, 1996: Scott Cooper was signed as a free agent by the Royals.
- January 16, 1997: Ryan Thompson signed as a free agent by the Royals.
- January 28, 1997: Melvin Bunch was traded by the Royals to the Montreal Expos for Yamil Benítez.
- March 4, 1997: Doug Linton was released by the Royals.
- March 26, 1997: Ryan Thompson was released by the Royals.
- March 26, 1997: Bob Hamelin was released by the Royals.
- March 27, 1997: Michael Tucker and Keith Lockhart were traded to the Atlanta Braves for Jermaine Dye and Jamie Walker.

== Regular season ==
=== Season standings ===
AL Central
Team	W	L	Pct.	GB	Home	Road
Cleveland Indians	86	75	.534	—	44‍–‍37	42‍–‍38
Chicago White Sox	80	81	.497	6	45‍–‍36	35‍–‍45
Milwaukee Brewers	78	83	.484	8	47‍–‍33	31‍–‍50
Minnesota Twins	68	94	.420	18½	35‍–‍46	33‍–‍48
Kansas City Royals	67	94	.416	19	33‍–‍47	34‍–‍47

=== Record vs. opponents ===
1997 American League record Source: MLB Standings Grid – 1997
Team	ANA	BAL	BOS	CWS	CLE	DET	KC	MIL	MIN	NYY	OAK	SEA	TEX	TOR	NL
Anaheim	—	4–7	6–5	6–5	7–4	5–6	6–5	7–4	4–7	4–7	11–1	6–6	8–4	6–5	4–12
Baltimore	7–4	—	5–7	5–6	6–5	6–6	7–4	5–6	10–1	8–4	8–3	7–4	10–1	6–6	8–7
Boston	5–6	7–5	—	3–8	6–5	5–7	3–8	8–3	8–3	4–8	7–4	7–4	3–8	6–6	6–9
Chicago	5–6	6–5	8–3	—	5–7	4–7	11–1	4–7	6–6	2–9	8–3	5–6	3–8	5–6	8–7
Cleveland	4–7	5–6	5–6	7–5	—	6–5	8–3	8–4	8–4	5–6	7–4	3–8	5–6	6–5	9–6
Detroit	6–5	6–6	7–5	7–4	5–6	—	6–5	4–7	4–7	2–10	7–4	4–7	7–4	6–6	8–7
Kansas City	5–6	4–7	8–3	1–11	3–8	5–6	—	6–6	7–5	3–8	3–8	5–6	6–5	5–6	6–9
Milwaukee	4–7	6–5	3–8	7–4	4–8	7–4	6–6	—	5–7	4–7	5–6	5–6	7–4	7–4	8–7
Minnesota	7–4	1–10	3–8	6–6	4–8	7–4	5–7	7–5	—	3–8	7–4	5–6	3–8	3–8	7–8
New York	7–4	4–8	8–4	9–2	6–5	10–2	8–3	7–4	8–3	—	6–5	4–7	7–4	7–5	5–10
Oakland	1–11	3–8	4–7	3–8	4–7	4–7	8–3	6–5	4–7	5–6	—	5–7	5–7	6–5	7–9
Seattle	6–6	4–7	4–7	6–5	8–3	7–4	6–5	6–5	6–5	7–4	7–5	—	8–4	8–3	7–9
Texas	4–8	1–10	8–3	8–3	6–5	4–7	5–6	4–7	8–3	4–7	7–5	4–8	—	4–7	10–6
Toronto	5–6	6–6	6–6	6–5	5–6	6–6	6–5	4–7	8–3	5–7	5–6	3–8	7–4	—	4–11

=== Notable transactions ===
- April 17, 1997: Todd Van Poppel was signed as a free agent by the Royals.
- June 6, 1997: Todd Van Poppel was released by the Royals.
- July 15, 1997: Chris Stynes and Jon Nunnally were traded by the Royals to the Cincinnati Reds for Héctor Carrasco and Scott Service.
- July 29, 1997: Matt Treanor was traded by the Royals to the Florida Marlins for Matt Whisenant.

=== Roster ===
1997 Kansas City Royals
Roster
Pitchers: 17 Kevin Appier; 41 Tim Belcher; 47,57 Brian Bevil; 27 Ricky Bones; 58 Héctor Carrasco; 45 Larry Casian; 38 Jim Converse; 52 Roland de la Maza; 33 Chris Haney; 45 Jason Jacome; 56 Allen McDill; 21 Jeff Montgomery; 48 Gregg Olson; 52 Mike Pérez; 35 Hipólito Pichardo; 34 Jim Pittsley; 50 José Rosado; 53 Glendon Rusch; 49 José Santiago; 46 Scott Service; 51 Randy Veres; 57 Jamie Walker; 56 Matt Whisenant; 46 Mike Williams; 49 Mitch Williams	Catchers: 26 Sal Fasano; 15 Mike Macfarlane; 2 Tim Spehr; 63 Andy Stewart; 29 Mike Sweeney; Infielders: 28 Jay Bell; 14,16 Scott Cooper; 2 Jed Hansen; 6 David Howard; 7 Jeff King; 36 Félix Martínez; 30 José Offerman; 16 Dean Palmer; 12 Craig Paquette; 22 Larry Sutton	Outfielders: 39 Yamil Benítez; 18 Johnny Damon; 24 Jermaine Dye; 42 Tom Goodwin; 43 Shane Halter; 36 Ryan Long; 31 Rod Myers; 22 Jon Nunnally; 1 Bip Roberts; 32 Joe Vitiello; Other batters: 44 Chili Davis	Manager: 8 Bob Boone; Coaches: 56 Rich Dauer (third base); 55 Guy Hansen; 54 Bruce Kison; 19 Greg Luzinski; 39 Mitchell Page; 9 Jamie Quirk (bench)

== Player stats ==
=== Batting ===
==== Starters by position ====
Note: Pos = Position; G = Games played; AB = At bats; H = Hits; Avg. = Batting average; HR = Home runs; RBI = Runs batted in

Pos	Player	G	AB	H	Avg.	HR	RBI
C	Mike Macfarlane	82	257	61	.237	8	35
1B	Jeff King	155	543	129	.238	28	112
2B	José Offerman	106	424	126	.297	2	39
SS	Jay Bell	153	573	167	.291	21	92
3B	Craig Paquette	77	252	58	.230	8	33
LF	Bip Roberts	97	346	107	.309	1	36
CF	Tom Goodwin	97	367	100	.272	2	22
RF	Jermaine Dye	75	263	62	.236	7	22
DH	Chili Davis	140	477	133	.279	30	90

==== Other batters ====
Note: G = Games played; AB = At bats; H = Hits; Avg. = Batting average; HR = Home runs; RBI = Runs batted in

Player	G	AB	H	Avg.	HR	RBI
Johnny Damon	146	472	130	.275	8	48
Mike Sweeney	84	240	58	.242	7	31
Yamil Benítez	53	191	51	.267	8	21
Dean Palmer	49	187	52	.278	9	31
David Howard	80	162	39	.241	1	13
Scott Cooper	75	159	32	.201	3	15
Joe Vitiello	51	130	31	.238	5	18
Shane Halter	74	123	34	.276	2	10
Rod Myers	31	101	26	.257	2	9
Jed Hansen	34	94	29	.309	1	14
Larry Sutton	27	69	20	.290	2	8
Sal Fasano	13	38	8	.211	1	1
Tim Spehr	17	35	6	.171	1	2
Félix Martínez	16	31	7	.226	0	3
Jon Nunnally	13	29	7	.241	1	4
Ryan Long	6	9	2	.222	0	2
Andy Stewart	5	8	2	.250	0	0

=== Pitching ===
==== Starting pitchers ====
Note: G = Games pitched; IP = Innings pitched; W = Wins; L = Losses; ERA = Earned run average; SO = Strikeouts

Player	G	IP	W	L	ERA	SO
Kevin Appier	34	235.2	9	13	3.40	196
Tim Belcher	32	213.1	13	12	5.02	113
José Rosado	33	203.1	9	12	4.69	129
Glendon Rusch	30	170.1	6	9	5.50	116
Jim Pittsley	21	112.0	5	8	5.46	52

==== Other pitchers ====
Note: G = Games pitched; IP = Innings pitched; W = Wins; L = Losses; ERA = Earned run average; SO = Strikeouts

Player	G	IP	W	L	ERA	SO
Ricky Bones	21	78.1	4	7	5.97	36
Chris Haney	8	24.2	1	2	4.38	16

==== Relief pitchers ====
Note: G = Games pitched; W = Wins; L = Losses; SV = Saves; ERA = Earned run average; SO = Strikeouts

Player	G	W	L	SV	ERA	SO
Jeff Montgomery	55	1	4	14	3.49	48
Jamie Walker	50	3	3	0	5.44	24
Hipólito Pichardo	47	3	5	11	4.22	34
Gregg Olson	34	4	3	1	3.02	28
Larry Casian	32	0	2	0	5.06	16
Héctor Carrasco	28	1	6	0	5.45	30
Randy Veres	24	4	0	1	3.31	28
Matt Whisenant	24	1	0	0	2.84	16
Brian Bevil	18	1	2	1	6.61	13
Mike Pérez	16	2	0	0	3.54	17
Scott Service	12	0	3	0	4.76	19
Mike Williams	10	0	2	1	6.43	10
Jason Jacome	7	0	0	0	9.45	10
Mitch Williams	7	0	1	0	10.80	3
José Santiago	4	0	0	0	1.93	1
Jim Converse	3	0	0	0	3.60	3
Allen McDill	3	0	0	0	13.50	2
Roland de la Maza	1	0	0	0	4.50	1

== Farm system ==
Level	Team	League	Manager
AAA	Omaha Royals	American Association	Mike Jirschele
AA	Wichita Wranglers	Texas League	Ron Johnson
A	Wilmington Blue Rocks	Carolina League	John Mizerock
A	Lansing Lugnuts	Midwest League	Bob Herold
A-Short Season	Spokane Indians	Northwest League	Jeff Garber
Rookie	GCL Royals	Gulf Coast League	Al Pedrique

LEAGUE CHAMPIONS: Lansing
