= 1997 Milwaukee Brewers season =

29th season in franchise history, final in American League

1997 Milwaukee Brewers
- League: American League
- Division: Central
- Ballpark: Milwaukee County Stadium
- City: Milwaukee, Wisconsin
- Record: 78–83 (.484)
- Divisional place: 3rd
- Owners: Bud Selig
- General managers: Sal Bando
- Managers: Phil Garner
- Television: WVTV; Wisconsin Sports Net (Matt Vasgersian, Bill Schroeder)
- Radio: WTMJ (AM) (Bob Uecker, Jim Powell)

The 1997 Milwaukee Brewers season was the 28th season for the Brewers in Milwaukee, and their 29th overall. The Brewers finished third in the American League Central, eight games behind the Cleveland Indians, with a record of 78 wins and 83 losses. 1997 was the Brewers' final season in the American League, before moving to the National League for the following season.

== Offseason ==
- November 27, 1996: Jeff Ware was selected off waivers by the Brewers from the Toronto Blue Jays.
- January 30, 1997: Jack Voigt was signed as a free agent by the Brewers.

== Regular season ==
(1997)
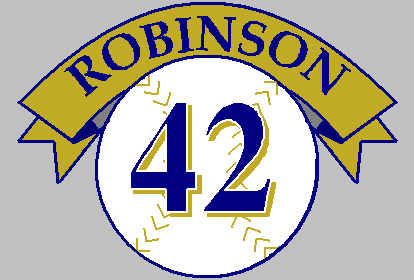
Jackie Robinson
Retired by
Major League Baseball

=== Season standings ===
AL Central
Team	W	L	Pct.	GB	Home	Road
Cleveland Indians	86	75	.534	—	44‍–‍37	42‍–‍38
Chicago White Sox	80	81	.497	6	45‍–‍36	35‍–‍45
Milwaukee Brewers	78	83	.484	8	47‍–‍33	31‍–‍50
Minnesota Twins	68	94	.420	18½	35‍–‍46	33‍–‍48
Kansas City Royals	67	94	.416	19	33‍–‍47	34‍–‍47

=== Record vs. opponents ===
1997 American League record Source: MLB Standings Grid – 1997
Team	ANA	BAL	BOS	CWS	CLE	DET	KC	MIL	MIN	NYY	OAK	SEA	TEX	TOR	NL
Anaheim	—	4–7	6–5	6–5	7–4	5–6	6–5	7–4	4–7	4–7	11–1	6–6	8–4	6–5	4–12
Baltimore	7–4	—	5–7	5–6	6–5	6–6	7–4	5–6	10–1	8–4	8–3	7–4	10–1	6–6	8–7
Boston	5–6	7–5	—	3–8	6–5	5–7	3–8	8–3	8–3	4–8	7–4	7–4	3–8	6–6	6–9
Chicago	5–6	6–5	8–3	—	5–7	4–7	11–1	4–7	6–6	2–9	8–3	5–6	3–8	5–6	8–7
Cleveland	4–7	5–6	5–6	7–5	—	6–5	8–3	8–4	8–4	5–6	7–4	3–8	5–6	6–5	9–6
Detroit	6–5	6–6	7–5	7–4	5–6	—	6–5	4–7	4–7	2–10	7–4	4–7	7–4	6–6	8–7
Kansas City	5–6	4–7	8–3	1–11	3–8	5–6	—	6–6	7–5	3–8	3–8	5–6	6–5	5–6	6–9
Milwaukee	4–7	6–5	3–8	7–4	4–8	7–4	6–6	—	5–7	4–7	5–6	5–6	7–4	7–4	8–7
Minnesota	7–4	1–10	3–8	6–6	4–8	7–4	5–7	7–5	—	3–8	7–4	5–6	3–8	3–8	7–8
New York	7–4	4–8	8–4	9–2	6–5	10–2	8–3	7–4	8–3	—	6–5	4–7	7–4	7–5	5–10
Oakland	1–11	3–8	4–7	3–8	4–7	4–7	8–3	6–5	4–7	5–6	—	5–7	5–7	6–5	7–9
Seattle	6–6	4–7	4–7	6–5	8–3	7–4	6–5	6–5	6–5	7–4	7–5	—	8–4	8–3	7–9
Texas	4–8	1–10	8–3	8–3	6–5	4–7	5–6	4–7	8–3	4–7	7–5	4–8	—	4–7	10–6
Toronto	5–6	6–6	6–6	6–5	5–6	6–6	6–5	4–7	8–3	5–7	5–6	3–8	7–4	—	4–11

=== Notable transactions ===
- August 13, 1997: Julio Franco was signed as a free agent by the Brewers.
- August 14, 1997: Mark Davis was acquired by the Brewers from the Arizona Diamondbacks as part of a conditional deal.

=== Roster ===
1997 Milwaukee Brewers
Roster
Pitchers: 38 Joel Adamson; 13 Jeff D'Amico; 37,48 Mark Davis; 21 Cal Eldred; 36 Mike Fetters; 39 Bryce Florie; 53 Greg Hansell; 31 Pete Harnisch; 43 Doug Jones; 42 Scott Karl; 46 Sean Maloney; 33 Jamie McAndrew; 40 Ben McDonald; 41 José Mercedes; 25 Ángel Miranda; 52 Mike Misuraca; 47 Al Reyes; 49 Ron Villone; 46 Paul Wagner; 27 Bob Wickman; 37,48 Steve Woodard	Catchers: 16 Jesse Levis; 22 Mike Matheny; 5 Kelly Stinnett; Infielders: 26 Jeff Cirillo; 51 Eddy Díaz; 25 Julio Franco; 15 Jeff Huson; 32 John Jaha; 8 Mark Loretta; 14 Dave Nilsson; 9 Tim Unroe; 2 José Valentín; 1 Fernando Viña; 29 Gerald Williams; 11 Antone Williamson	Outfielders: 7 Brian Banks; 20 Jeromy Burnitz; 24 Chuck Carr; 18 Todd Dunn; 24 Darrin Jackson; 30 Matt Mieske; 10 Marc Newfield; 28 Jack Voigt	Manager: 3 Phil Garner; Coaches: 12 Chris Bando (Third Base); 35 Bill Castro (Bullpen); 17 Jim Gantner (First Base); 23 Lamar Johnson (Hitting); 45 Don Rowe (Pitching)

== Player stats ==
=== Batting ===
==== Starters by position ====
Note: Pos = Position; G = Games played; AB = At bats; H = Hits; Avg. = Batting average; HR = Home runs; RBI = Runs batted in

Pos	Player	G	AB	H	Avg.	HR	RBI
C	Mike Matheny	123	320	78	.244	4	32
1B	Dave Nilsson	156	554	154	.278	20	81
2B	Fernando Viña	79	324	89	.275	4	28
3B	Jeff Cirillo	154	580	167	.288	10	82
SS	José Valentín	136	494	125	.253	17	58
LF	Gerald Williams	155	566	143	.253	10	41
CF	Jeromy Burnitz	153	494	139	.281	27	85
RF	Matt Mieske	84	253	63	.249	5	21
DH	Julio Franco	42	141	34	.241	4	19

==== Other batters ====
Note: G = Games played; AB = At bats; H = Hits; Avg. = Batting average; HR = Home runs; RBI = Runs batted in

Player	G	AB	H	Avg.	HR	RBI
Mark Loretta	132	418	120	.287	5	47
Jesse Levis	99	200	57	.285	1	19
John Jaha	46	162	40	.247	11	26
Marc Newfield	50	157	36	.229	1	18
Jack Voigt	72	151	37	.245	8	22
Jeff Huson	84	143	29	.203	0	11
Todd Dunn	44	118	27	.229	3	9
Darrin Jackson	26	81	22	.272	2	15
Brian Banks	28	68	14	.206	1	8
Antone Williamson	24	54	11	.204	0	6
Eddy Díaz	16	50	11	.220	0	7
Chuck Carr	26	46	6	.130	0	0
Kelly Stinnett	30	36	9	.250	0	3
Tim Unroe	32	16	4	.250	2	5

=== Pitching ===
==== Starting pitchers ====
Note: G = Games pitched; IP = Innings pitched; W = Wins; L = Losses; ERA = Earned run average; SO = Strikeouts

Player	G	IP	W	L	ERA	SO
Cal Eldred	34	202.0	13	15	4.99	122
Scott Karl	32	193.1	10	13	4.47	119
José Mercedes	29	159.0	7	10	3.79	80
Jeff D'Amico	23	135.2	9	7	4.71	94
Ben McDonald	21	133.0	8	7	4.06	110
Steve Woodard	7	36.2	3	3	5.15	32
Jamie McAndrew	5	19.1	1	1	8.38	8
Pete Harnisch	4	14.0	1	1	5.14	10

==== Other pitchers ====
Note: G = Games pitched; IP = Innings pitched; W = Wins; L = Losses; ERA = Earned run average; SO = Strikeouts

Player	G	IP	W	L	ERA	SO
Joel Adamson	30	76.1	5	3	3.54	56
Bryce Florie	32	75.0	4	4	4.32	53

==== Relief pitchers ====
Note: G = Games pitched; W = Wins; L = Losses; SV = Saves; ERA = Earned run average; SO = Strikeouts

Player	G	W	L	SV	ERA	SO
Doug Jones	75	6	6	36	2.02	82
Bob Wickman	74	7	6	1	2.73	78
Mike Fetters	51	1	5	6	3.45	62
Ron Villone	50	1	0	0	3.42	40
Al Reyes	19	1	2	1	5.46	28
Mark Davis	19	0	0	0	5.51	14
Ángel Miranda	10	0	0	0	3.86	8
Mike Misuraca	5	0	0	0	11.32	10
Sean Maloney	3	0	0	0	5.14	5
Greg Hansell	3	0	0	0	9.64	5
Paul Wagner	2	1	0	0	9.00	0

== Farm system ==
The Brewers' farm system consisted of seven minor league affiliates in 1997.

Level	Team	League	Manager
Triple-A	Tucson Toros	Pacific Coast League	Tim Ireland and Bob Mariano
Double-A	El Paso Diablos	Texas League	Dave Machemer
Class A-Advanced	Stockton Ports	California League	Greg Mahlberg
Class A	Beloit Snappers	Midwest League	Luis Salazar
Rookie	Helena Brewers	Pioneer League	Alex Morales
Rookie	Ogden Raptors	Pioneer League	Bernie Moncallo
Rookie	DSL Brewers	Dominican Summer League	—
