= 1997 New York Yankees season =

Season for the Major League Baseball team the New York Yankees

1997 New York Yankees
- American League Wild Card winners
- League: American League
- Division: East
- Ballpark: Yankee Stadium
- City: New York City
- Record: 96–66 (.593)
- Divisional place: 2nd
- Owners: George Steinbrenner
- General managers: Bob Watson
- Managers: Joe Torre
- Television: WPIX (Bobby Murcer, Rick Cerone); MSG (Ken Singleton, Jim Kaat, Al Trautwig, Suzyn Waldman)
- Radio: WABC (AM) (John Sterling, Michael Kay)

The 1997 New York Yankees season was the 95th season for the New York Yankees of Major League Baseball. The Yankees played its home games at Yankee Stadium in the Bronx and were managed by Joe Torre.

The team finished with a record of 96–66, finishing two games behind the Baltimore Orioles in the American League East. They entered the postseason as the American League Wild Card, but lost the Division Series in five games to the Cleveland Indians, failing to repeat as World Series Champions and win their second consecutive title.

== Offseason ==
- October 2, 1996: Pat Listach was sent by the New York Yankees to the Milwaukee Brewers to complete an earlier deal made on August 23, 1996. The New York Yankees sent Bob Wickman and Gerald Williams to the Milwaukee Brewers for a player to be named later, Pat Listach, and Graeme Lloyd. The Milwaukee Brewers sent Ricky Bones (August 29, 1996) to the New York Yankees to complete the trade. Pat Listach returned to original teams on October 2, 1996.
- November 4, 1996: Clay Bellinger was signed as a free agent with the New York Yankees.
- December 5, 1996: Jim Leyritz was traded by the New York Yankees to the Anaheim Angels for players to be named later. The Anaheim Angels sent Jeremy Blevins (minors) (December 9, 1996) and Ryan Kane (minors) (December 9, 1996) to the New York Yankees to complete the trade.
- December 11, 1996: Mike Stanton was signed as a free agent with the New York Yankees.
- January 9, 1997: Mark Whiten was signed as a free agent with the New York Yankees.
- January 9, 1997: Luis Sojo was signed as a free agent with the New York Yankees.

=== Notable transaction chart ===
- June 9, 1997: Dave Weathers was traded by the New York Yankees to the Cleveland Indians for Chad Curtis.
- July 29, 1997: Mariano Duncan was traded by the New York Yankees with cash to the Toronto Blue Jays for Angel Ramirez (minors).
- August 15, 1997: Mark Whiten was released by the New York Yankees.

== Season standings ==
AL East
Team	W	L	Pct.	GB	Home	Road
Baltimore Orioles	98	64	.605	—	46‍–‍35	52‍–‍29
New York Yankees	96	66	.593	2	47‍–‍33	49‍–‍33
Detroit Tigers	79	83	.488	19	42‍–‍39	37‍–‍44
Boston Red Sox	78	84	.481	20	39‍–‍42	39‍–‍42
Toronto Blue Jays	76	86	.469	22	42‍–‍39	34‍–‍47

== Season summary ==
=== June ===
On June 16: The first interleague game between the New York Mets and New York Yankees took place at Yankee Stadium. The Mets won the game by a score of 6–0.

=== August ===
On August 31: The New York Yankees retired Don Mattingly's number.

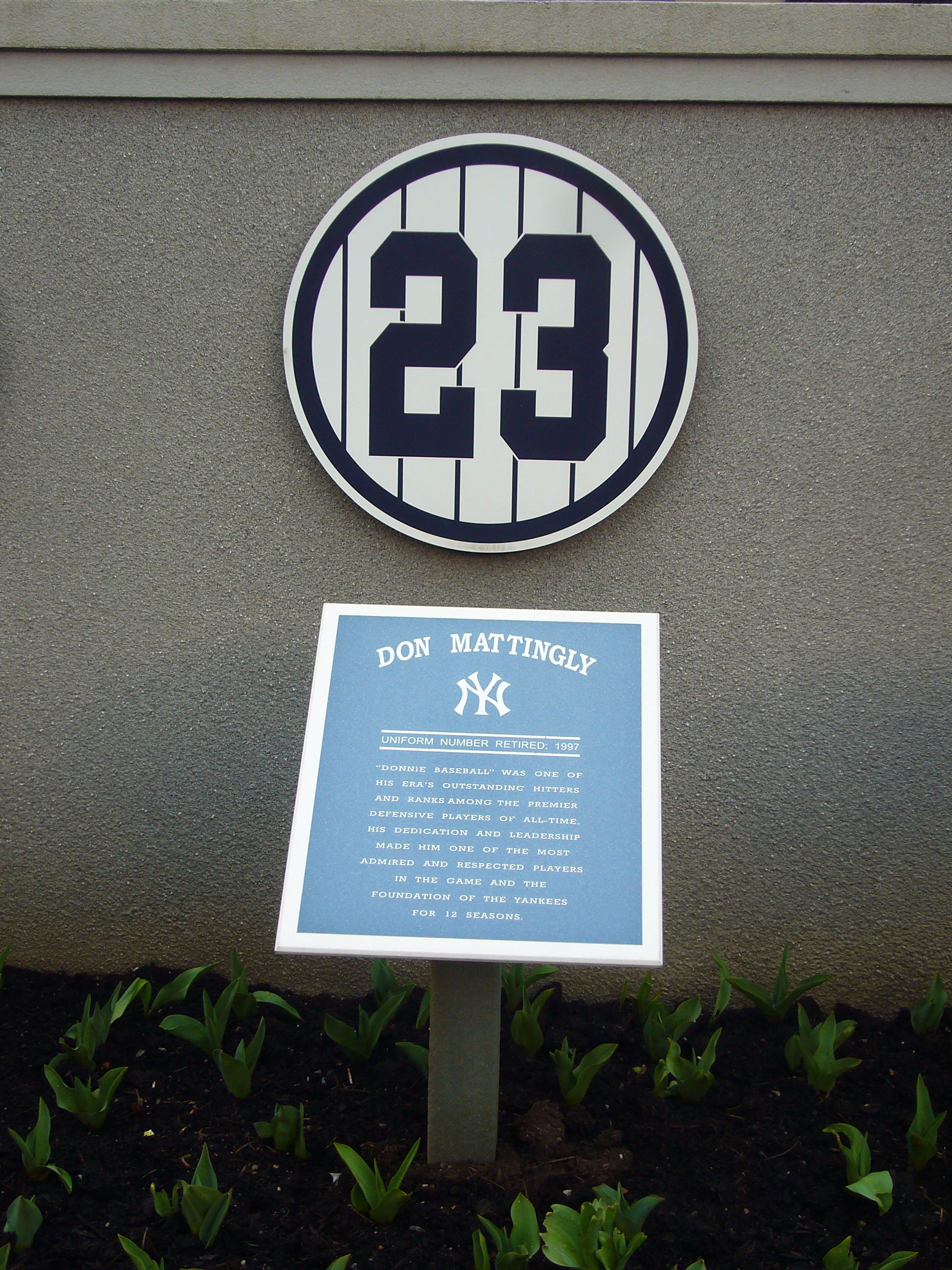
Mattingly's retired number in Monument Park at Yankee Stadium

=== Record vs. opponents ===
1997 American League record Source: MLB Standings Grid – 1997
Team	ANA	BAL	BOS	CWS	CLE	DET	KC	MIL	MIN	NYY	OAK	SEA	TEX	TOR	NL
Anaheim	—	4–7	6–5	6–5	7–4	5–6	6–5	7–4	4–7	4–7	11–1	6–6	8–4	6–5	4–12
Baltimore	7–4	—	5–7	5–6	6–5	6–6	7–4	5–6	10–1	8–4	8–3	7–4	10–1	6–6	8–7
Boston	5–6	7–5	—	3–8	6–5	5–7	3–8	8–3	8–3	4–8	7–4	7–4	3–8	6–6	6–9
Chicago	5–6	6–5	8–3	—	5–7	4–7	11–1	4–7	6–6	2–9	8–3	5–6	3–8	5–6	8–7
Cleveland	4–7	5–6	5–6	7–5	—	6–5	8–3	8–4	8–4	5–6	7–4	3–8	5–6	6–5	9–6
Detroit	6–5	6–6	7–5	7–4	5–6	—	6–5	4–7	4–7	2–10	7–4	4–7	7–4	6–6	8–7
Kansas City	5–6	4–7	8–3	1–11	3–8	5–6	—	6–6	7–5	3–8	3–8	5–6	6–5	5–6	6–9
Milwaukee	4–7	6–5	3–8	7–4	4–8	7–4	6–6	—	5–7	4–7	5–6	5–6	7–4	7–4	8–7
Minnesota	7–4	1–10	3–8	6–6	4–8	7–4	5–7	7–5	—	3–8	7–4	5–6	3–8	3–8	7–8
New York	7–4	4–8	8–4	9–2	6–5	10–2	8–3	7–4	8–3	—	6–5	4–7	7–4	7–5	5–10
Oakland	1–11	3–8	4–7	3–8	4–7	4–7	8–3	6–5	4–7	5–6	—	5–7	5–7	6–5	7–9
Seattle	6–6	4–7	4–7	6–5	8–3	7–4	6–5	6–5	6–5	7–4	7–5	—	8–4	8–3	7–9
Texas	4–8	1–10	8–3	8–3	6–5	4–7	5–6	4–7	8–3	4–7	7–5	4–8	—	4–7	10–6
Toronto	5–6	6–6	6–6	6–5	5–6	6–6	6–5	4–7	8–3	5–7	5–6	3–8	7–4	—	4–11

=== Detailed record ===
Team	Home	Away	Total	Win %
AL East
Baltimore Orioles	1-5	3-3	4-8	.333
Boston Red Sox	4-2	4-2	8-4	.667
Detroit Tigers	4-2	6-0	10-2	.833
Toronto Blue Jays	3-3	4-2	7-5	.583
Total	12-12	17-7	29-19	.604
AL Central
Chicago White Sox	4-1	5-1	9-2	.818
Cleveland Indians	3-2	3-3	6-5	.545
Kansas City Royals	4-2	4-1	8-3	.727
Milwaukee Brewers	5-0	2-4	7-4	.636
Minnesota Twins	3-2	5-1	8-3	.727
Total	19-7	19-10	38-17	.691
AL West
Anaheim Angels	2–2	5–2	7–4	.636
Oakland Athletics	4-2	2-3	6-5	.545
Seattle Mariners	2-4	2-3	4-7	.364
Texas Rangers	4-1	3-3	7-4	.636
Total	12–9	12–11	24–20	.545
NL East
Atlanta Braves	1-2	0-0	1-2	.333
Florida Marlins	0-0	1-2	1-2	.333
Montreal Expos	1-2	0-0	1-2	.333
New York Mets	2-1	0-0	2-1	.667
Philadelphia Phillies	0-0	0-3	0-3	.000
Total	4-5	1-5	5-10	.333

Month	Games	Won	Lost	Win %
April	27	14	13	.519
May	27	15	12	.556
June	25	17	8	.680
July	26	15	11	.577
August	29	18	11	.621
September	28	17	11	.607
Overall:	162	96	66	.593

	Games	Won	Lost	Win %
Home	80	47	33	.588
Away	82	49	33	.598

=== Roster ===
1997 New York Yankees
Roster
Pitchers: 62 Willie Banks; 41 Brian Boehringer; 52 Joe Borowski; 36 David Cone; 11 Dwight Gooden; 35 Hideki Irabu; 27 Graeme Lloyd; 54 Jim Mecir; 55 Ramiro Mendoza; 43 Jeff Nelson; 46 Andy Pettitte; 63 Danny Rios; 42 Mariano Rivera; 17 Kenny Rogers; 29 Mike Stanton; 52 David Weathers; 33 David Wells	Catchers: 63 Mike Figga; 25 Joe Girardi; 22,20 Jorge Posada; Infielders: 12 Wade Boggs; 38 Homer Bush; 47 Iván Cruz; 18 Mariano Duncan; 45 Cecil Fielder; 18,26 Andy Fox; 13 Charlie Hayes; 2 Derek Jeter; 14 Pat Kelly; 24 Tino Martinez; 26 Rey Sánchez; 19 Luis Sojo; 20 Mike Stanley	Outfielders: 28 Chad Curtis; 21 Paul O'Neill; 38 Scott Pose; 31 Tim Raines; 39 Darryl Strawberry; 22 Mark Whiten; 51 Bernie Williams; Other batters: 52 Pete Incaviglia	Manager: 6 Joe Torre; Coaches: 53 José Cardenal (First Base); 50 Chris Chambliss (Hitting); 40 Tony Cloninger (Bullpen); 30 Willie Randolph (Third Base); 34 Mel Stottlemyre (Pitching); 48 Don Zimmer (Bench)

=== Game log ===
Legend
Yankees Win	Yankees Loss	Game postponed

1997 Game Log (96–66) Home: 47–33 Away: 49–33
April (14–13) Home: 7–6 Away: 7–7

#	Date	Opponent	Score	Win	Loss	Save	Location	Attendance	Record
1	April 1	@ Mariners	2–4	Fassero (1–0)	Cone (0–1)	Charlton (1)	Kingdome	57,586	0–1
2	April 2	@ Mariners	16–2	Pettitte (1–0)	Sanders (0–1)		Kingdome	30,951	1–1
3	April 4	@ Athletics	2–4	Acre (1–0)	Weathers (0–1)	Taylor (2)	Oakland Alameda Coliseum	17,330	1–2
4	April 5	@ Athletics	10–5	Gooden (1–0)	Mohler (0–1)	Rivera (1)	Oakland Alameda Coliseum	25,438	2–2
5	April 6	@ Athletics	0–3	Acre (2–0)	Nelson (0–1)	Taylor (3)	Oakland Alameda Coliseum	22,124	2–3
6	April 7	@ Angels	5–3	Pettitte (2–0)	Langston (0–1)	Rivera (2)	Anaheim Stadium	16,514	3–3
7	April 8	@ Angels	9–10 (12)	James (1–0)	Nelson (0–2)		Anaheim Stadium	17,202	3–4
8	April 9	@ Angels	12–5	Wells (1–0)	Watson (0–1)		Anaheim Stadium	19,242	4–4
9	April 11	Athletics	1–3	Small (2–0)	Nelson (0–3)		Yankee Stadium	56,710	4–5
10	April 13	Athletics	3–2	Pettitte (3–0)	Telgheder (0–1)	Rivera (3)	Yankee Stadium		5–5
11	April 13	Athletics	4–7	Prieto (1–0)	Mendoza (0–1)	Taylor (5)	Yankee Stadium	32,098	5–6
12	April 14	Angels	1–5	Dickson (2–0)	Rogers (0–1)		Yankee Stadium	15,082	5–7
13	April 15	Angels	5–6	Hasegawa (1–1)	Rivera (0–1)	James (1)	Yankee Stadium	16,944	5–8
14	April 16	@ Brewers	4–7	Mercedes (1–0)	Cone (0–2)	Jones (4)	Milwaukee County Stadium	7,263	5–9
15	April 17	@ Brewers	4–5	Wickman (2–0)	Lloyd (0–1)		Milwaukee County Stadium	8,018	5–10
16	April 18	@ White Sox	10–4	Mendoza (1–1)	Navarro (1–1)		Comiskey Park II	18,603	6–10
17	April 19	@ White Sox	3–2	Rogers (1–1)	Castillo (1–2)	Rivera (4)	Comiskey Park II	24,976	7–10
18	April 20	@ White Sox	7–8	Levine (1–1)	Boehringer (0–1)		Comiskey Park II	23,601	7–11
19	April 21	@ White Sox	4–3	Cone (1–2)	Drabek (1–2)	Rivera (5)	Comiskey Park II	16,694	8–11
20	April 22	Brewers	10–2	Pettitte (4–0)	D'Amico (0–1)		Yankee Stadium	18,018	9–11
21	April 23	Brewers	10–5	Rogers (2–1)	McDonald (2–2)	Lloyd (1)	Yankee Stadium	22,704	10–11
22	April 25	White Sox	3–9	Álvarez (1–3)	Wells (1–1)		Yankee Stadium	24,648	10–12
23	April 26	White Sox	10–2	Cone (2–2)	Baldwin (0–3)	Rivera (6)	Yankee Stadium	28,817	11–12
24	April 27	White Sox	7–1	Pettitte (5–0)	Drabek (1–3)		Yankee Stadium	36,133	12–12
25	April 28	Mariners	6–5	Nelson (1–3)	Ayala (2–1)	Rivera (7)	Yankee Stadium	20,054	13–12
26	April 29	Mariners	5–7	McCarthy (1–0)	Mecir (0–1)		Yankee Stadium	21,955	13–13
27	April 30	Mariners	3–2	Wells (2–1)	Martínez (1–2)	Rivera (8)	Yankee Stadium	25,708	14–13

May (15–12) Home: 6–8 Away: 9–4

#	Date	Opponent	Score	Win	Loss	Save	Location	Attendance	Record
28	May 2	@ Royals	9–1	Cone (3–2)	Pittsley (0–2)	Rivera (9)	Kauffman Stadium	24,258	15–13
29	May 3	@ Royals	1–2	Belcher (3–3)	Pettitte (5–1)		Kauffman Stadium	25,585	15–14
30	May 4	@ Royals	13–5	Boehringer (1–1)	Rusch (2–2)		Kauffman Stadium	30,034	16–14
31	May 5	Twins	8–9	Swindell (2–1)	Mecir (0–2)		Yankee Stadium	16,599	16–15
32	May 6	Twins	7–2	Wells (3–1)	Aldred (1–4)		Yankee Stadium	13,939	17–15
33	May 7	Rangers	5–2	Cone (4–2)	Burkett (1–2)	Rivera (10)	Yankee Stadium	18,778	18–15
34	May 8	Rangers	5–4	Pettitte (6–1)	Oliver (1–3)	Rivera (11)	Yankee Stadium	17,483	19–15
35	May 9	Royals	5–7	Veres (2–0)	Boehringer (1–2)		Yankee Stadium	20,098	19–16
36	May 10	Royals	5–2	Mendoza (2–1)	Appier (4–2)	Rivera (12)	Yankee Stadium	25,007	20–16
37	May 11	Royals	3–2	Wells (4–2)	Rosado (3–1)	Rivera (13)	Yankee Stadium	25,705	21–16
38	May 13	@ Twins	11–2	Cone (5–2)	Robertson (3–2)		Hubert H. Humphrey Metrodome	15,082	22–16
39	May 14	@ Twins	6–5	Boehringer (2–2)	Guardado (0–1)	Rivera (14)	Hubert H. Humphrey Metrodome	17,660	23–16
40	May 15	@ Rangers	8–2	Rogers (3–1)	Alberro (0–1)		The Ballpark in Arlington	35,488	24–16
41	May 16	@ Rangers	0–6	Santana (2–0)	Wells (4–2)	Patterson (1)	The Ballpark in Arlington	42,420	24–17
42	May 17	@ Rangers	11–5	Mendoza (3–1)	Burkett (2–3)		The Ballpark in Arlington	46,625	25–17
43	May 18	@ Rangers	2–4	Oliver (2–4)	Cone (5–3)	Wetteland (10)	The Ballpark in Arlington	46,850	25–18
44	May 20	Blue Jays	0–2	Hentgen (5–1)	Pettitte (6–2)		Yankee Stadium	20,220	25–19
45	May 21	Blue Jays	1–4	Clemens (8–0)	Rogers (3–2)		Yankee Stadium	19,863	25–20
46	May 22	Red Sox	2–8	Gordon (3–5)	Wells (4–3)		Yankee Stadium	28,255	25–21
47	May 23	Red Sox	3–9	Sele (5–3)	Nelson (1–4)		Yankee Stadium	29,003	25–22
48	May 24	Red Sox	4–2	Rivera (1–1)	Wasdin (0–2)		Yankee Stadium	44,094	26–22
49	May 26	Orioles	6–8	Boskie (2–2)	Pettitte (6–3)	Myers (16)	Yankee Stadium	40,296	26–23
50	May 27	Orioles	6–10	Kamieniecki (4–2)	Rogers (3–3)	Benítez (6)	Yankee Stadium	29,392	26–24
51	May 28	@ Blue Jays	6–4	Wells (5–3)	Guzman (3–5)	Rivera (15)	SkyDome	32,338	27–24
52	May 29	@ Blue Jays	4–0	Cone (6–3)	Williams (1–5)	Nelson (1)	SkyDome	43,155	28–24
53	May 30	@ Red Sox	4–10	Hammond (3–3)	Mendoza (3–2)		Fenway Park	32,341	28–25
54	May 31	@ Red Sox	7–2	Pettitte (7–3)	Wakefield (1–4)		Fenway Park	32,736	29–25

June (17–8) Home: 10–2 Away: 7–6

#	Date	Opponent	Score	Win	Loss	Save	Location	Attendance	Record
55	June 1	@ Red Sox	11–6	Nelson (2–4)	Lacy (0–1)		Fenway Park	31,798	30–25
56	June 2	@ Red Sox	5–2	Wells (6–3)	Sele (6–4)	Rivera (16)	Fenway Park	31,329	31–25
57	June 3	@ Orioles	5–7	Myers (1–2)	Mecir (0–3)		Oriole Park at Camden Yards	47,577	31–26
58	June 4	@ Orioles	7–9	Orosco (2–0)	Nelson (2–5)	Myers (18)	Oriole Park at Camden Yards	47,748	31–27
59	June 6	Brewers	6–3	Rogers (4–3)	Mercedes (2–2)	Rivera (17)	Yankee Stadium	24,578	32–27
60	June 7	Brewers	2–0	Wells (7–3)	Karl (2–7)	Rivera (18)	Yankee Stadium	28,074	33–27
61	June 8	Brewers	3–1	Cone (7–3)	D'Amico (2–3)	Rivera (19)	Yankee Stadium	41,268	34–27
62	June 10	White Sox	12–1	Pettitte (8–3)	Navarro (4–5)		Yankee Stadium	28,079	35–27
63	June 11	White Sox	7–5	Stanton (1–0)	McElroy (0–1)	Rivera (20)	Yankee Stadium	22,190	36–27
64	June 13	@ Marlins	1–2	Cook (1–0)	Mecir (0–4)		Pro Player Stadium	42,455	36–28
65	June 15	@ Marlins	8–5	Stanton (2–0)	Cook (1–1)	Rivera (21)	Pro Player Stadium	42,845	37–28
66	June 15	@ Marlins	5–6	Nen (5–2)	Rivera (1–2)		Pro Player Stadium	42,153	37–29
67	June 16	Mets	0–6	Mlicki (3–5)	Pettitte (8–4)		Yankee Stadium	56,188	37–30
68	June 17	Mets	6–3	Wells (8–3)	Reynoso (5–1)	Rivera (22)	Yankee Stadium	56,253	38–30
69	June 18	Mets	3–2	Stanton (3–0)	McMichael (3–6)		Yankee Stadium	56,278	39–30
70	June 20	@ Indians	7–1	Gooden (2–0)	Nagy (8–4)		Jacobs Field	43,019	40–30
71	June 21	@ Indians	4–13	Hershiser (7–3)	Pettitte (8–5)		Jacobs Field	43,006	40–31
72	June 22	@ Indians	2–5	Anderson (2–1)	Wells (8–4)	Jackson (8)	Jacobs Field	42,912	40–32
73	June 23	@ Tigers	5–2	Cone (8–3)	Lira (4–4)	Rivera (23)	Tiger Stadium	14,556	41–32
74	June 24	@ Tigers	12–9	Lloyd (1–1)	Myers (0–4)	Rivera (24)	Tiger Stadium	15,872	42–32
75	June 25	@ Tigers	3–1	Stanton (4–0)	Thompson (7–6)	Rivera (25)	Tiger Stadium	15,348	43–32
76	June 27	Indians	3–2	Gooden (3–0)	Hershiser (7–4)	Rivera (26)	Yankee Stadium	35,837	44–32
77	June 28	Indians	8–12	Plunk (2–2)	Rogers (4–4)		Yankee Stadium	41,085	44–33
78	June 29	Indians	11–10	Rivera (2–2)	Mesa (0–4)		Yankee Stadium	39,756	45–33
79	June 30	Braves	1–0	Stanton (5–0)	Bielecki (3–4)		Yankee Stadium	39,887	46–33

July (15–11) Home: 9–7 Away: 6–4

#	Date	Opponent	Score	Win	Loss	Save	Location	Attendance	Record
80	July 1	Braves	1–3	Neagle (12–1)	Mendoza (3–3)	Wohlers (18)	Yankee Stadium	39,596	46–34
81	July 2	Braves	0–2	Maddux (11–3)	Gooden (3–1)		Yankee Stadium	36,606	46–35
82	July 3	@ Blue Jays	3–1	Wells (9–4)	Williams (3–8)	Rivera (27)	SkyDome	31,227	47–35
83	July 4	@ Blue Jays	0–1	Escobar (2–0)	Cone (8–4)		SkyDome	34,134	47–36
84	July 5	@ Blue Jays	8–0	Pettitte (9–4)	Hentgen (8–6)		SkyDome	44,206	48–36
85	July 6	@ Blue Jays	0–2	Clemens (13–3)	Mendoza (3–4)		SkyDome	41,137	48–37
86	July 10	Tigers	10–3	Irabu (1–0)	Olivares (5–6)		Yankee Stadium	51,901	49–37
87	July 11	Tigers	3–0	Pettitte (10–5)	Moehler (6–7)	Rivera (28)	Yankee Stadium	27,135	50–37
88	July 12	Tigers	6–2	Cone (9–4)	Lira (5–6)	Rivera (29)	Yankee Stadium	39,681	51–37
89	July 13	Tigers	1–3	Blair (7–4)	Gooden (3–2)	Jones (14)	Yankee Stadium	36,679	51–38
90	July 14	Indians	2–3	Jackson (2–1)	Rivera (2–3)		Yankee Stadium	27,812	51–39
91	July 15	Indians	12–6	Irabu (2–0)	Nagy (9–6)	Mendoza (1)	Yankee Stadium	34,503	52–39
92	July 16	@ White Sox	11–5	Pettitte (11–5)	Álvarez (8–7)		Comiskey Park II	26,144	53–39
93	July 17	@ White Sox	4–2	Cone (10–4)	Darwin (4–7)	Rivera (30)	Comiskey Park II	31,923	54–39
94	July 18	@ Brewers	4–6	D'Amico (8–4)	Gooden (3–3)	Fetters (1)	Milwaukee County Stadium	24,071	54–40
95	July 19	@ Brewers	8–0	Wells (10–4)	Mercedes (3–5)		Milwaukee County Stadium	38,156	55–40
96	July 20	@ Brewers	2–6	Karl (4–10)	Irabu (2–1)		Milwaukee County Stadium	29,333	55–41
97	July 21	@ Brewers	7–3	Pettitte (12–5)	Florie (1–2)	Stanton (1)	Milwaukee County Stadium	20,074	56–41
98	July 22	Angels	9–2	Cone (11–4)	Springer (5–4)		Yankee Stadium	25,816	57–41
99	July 23	Angels	5–4	Nelson (3–5)	Hasegawa (2–5)		Yankee Stadium	26,750	58–41
–	July 24	Angels	Postponed (rain); rescheduled for August 20						
100	July 25	Mariners	1–8	Moyer (11–3)	Wells (10–5)		Yankee Stadium	46,282	58–42
101	July 26	Mariners	7–9	Ayala (7–4)	Irabu (2–2)	Charlton (14)	Yankee Stadium	54,664	58–43
102	July 27	Mariners	2–3	Fassero (9–6)	Pettitte (12–6)	Wells (2)	Yankee Stadium	49,550	58–44
103	July 28	Athletics	4–3	Rivera (3–3)	Small (7–5)		Yankee Stadium	25,570	59–44
104	July 29	Athletics	7–4	Gooden (4–3)	Reyes (3–2)	Rivera (31)	Yankee Stadium	33,341	60–44
105	July 30	Athletics	7–0	Wells (11–5)	Karsay (3–11)		Yankee Stadium	35,480	61–44

August (18–11) Home: 7–5 Away: 11–6

#	Date	Opponent	Score	Win	Loss	Save	Location	Attendance	Record
106	August 1	Twins	8–3	Pettitte (13–6)	Robertson (7–9)		Yankee Stadium	28,042	62–44
107	August 2	Twins	4–5	Swindell (7–2)	Cone (11–5)	Aguilera (20)	Yankee Stadium	33,261	62–45
108	August 3	Twins	6–5	Gooden (5–3)	Hawkins (3–7)	Rivera (32)	Yankee Stadium	36,896	63–45
109	August 4	@ Royals	5–4	Wells (12–5)	Rusch (3–8)	Rivera (33)	Kauffman Stadium	29,613	64–45
110	August 5	@ Royals	4–1	Rogers (5–4)	Appier (6–10)		Kauffman Stadium	21,073	65–45
111	August 6	@ Rangers	2–6	Oliver (8–10)	Pettitte (13–7)		The Ballpark in Arlington	34,067	65–46
112	August 7	@ Rangers	4–2	Cone (12–5)	Witt (10–8)	Rivera (34)	The Ballpark in Arlington	39,918	66–46
113	August 8	@ Twins	1–9	Hawkins (4–7)	Gooden (5–4)		Hubert H. Humphrey Metrodome	24,201	66–47
114	August 9	@ Twins	4–1	Wells (13–5)	Radke (16–6)	Rivera (35)	Hubert H. Humphrey Metrodome	42,151	67–47
115	August 10	@ Twins	9–6	Mendoza (4–4)	Miller (0–3)	Rivera (36)	Hubert H. Humphrey Metrodome	28,580	68–47
116	August 11	@ Twins	11–0	Pettitte (14–7)	Robertson (7–11)		Hubert H. Humphrey Metrodome	22,301	69–47
117	August 12	Royals	4–6	Perez (2–0)	Cone (12–6)	Montgomery (8)	Yankee Stadium	31,452	69–48
118	August 13	Royals	9–3	Irabu (3–2)	Belcher (11–11)		Yankee Stadium	31,418	70–48
119	August 14	Royals	10–5	Wells (14–5)	Olson (1–1)	Rivera (37)	Yankee Stadium	28,991	71–48
120	August 15	Rangers	5–2	Gooden (6–4)	Clark (1–4)	Rivera (38)	Yankee Stadium	36,231	72–48
121	August 16	Rangers	5–8	Wetteland (7–2)	Mendoza (4–5)		Yankee Stadium	41,634	72–49
122	August 17	Rangers	8–0	Mendoza (5–5)	Witt (11–9)		Yankee Stadium	42,002	73–49
123	August 19	@ Angels	4–12	Dickson (12–5)	Wells (14–6)		Anaheim Stadium	22,596	73–50
124	August 20	@ Angels	7–3	Gooden (7–4)	Hill (6–10)	Mendoza (2)	Anaheim Stadium	N/A	74–50
125	August 20	@ Angels	8–5	Irabu (4–2)	Langston (2–4)	Rivera (39)	Anaheim Stadium	32,343	75–50
126	August 21	@ Angels	4–3 (12)	Stanton (6–0)	Harris (2–3)	Nelson (2)	Anaheim Stadium	27,102	76–50
127	August 22	@ Mariners	5–9	Fassero (13–7)	Rogers (5–5)		Kingdome	57,351	76–51
128	August 23	@ Mariners	10–8	Rivera (4–3)	Slocumb (0–7)	Stanton (2)	Kingdome	57,282	77–51
129	August 24	@ Mariners	3–5	Ayala (9–4)	Wells (14–7)	Timlin (10)	Kingdome	54,391	77–52
130	August 26	@ Athletics	18–2	Pettitte (15–7)	Oquist (2–4)		Oakland Alameda Coliseum	14,301	78–52
131	August 27	@ Athletics	7–8	Matthews (8–5)	Nelson (3–6)		Oakland Alameda Coliseum	18,079	78–53
132	August 29	Expos	3–4	Telford (4–4)	Rivera (4–4)	Urbina (23)	Yankee Stadium	33,893	78–54
133	August 30	Expos	2–7	Martínez (16–6)	Wells (14–8)		Yankee Stadium	40,362	78–55
134	August 31	Expos	3–2	Pettitte (16–7)	Johnson (1–3)	Rivera (40)	Yankee Stadium	55,707	79–55

September (17–11) Home: 8–5 Away: 9–6

#	Date	Opponent	Score	Win	Loss	Save	Location	Attendance	Record
135	September 1	@ Phillies	1–5	Schilling (14–10)	Irabu (4–3)		Veterans Stadium	50,869	79–56
136	September 2	@ Phillies	0–5	Grace (2–0)	Rogers (5–6)		Veterans Stadium	37,258	79–57
137	September 3	@ Phillies	4–5	Spradlin (3–6)	Stanton (6–1)		Veterans Stadium	38,352	79–58
138	September 4	Orioles	2–5	Krivda (3–0)	Wells (14–9)	Myers (41)	Yankee Stadium	39,770	79–59
139	September 5	Orioles	9–13	Key (15–8)	Irabu (4–4)		Yankee Stadium	46,568	79–60
140	September 6	Orioles	1–4	Erickson (16–5)	Mendoza (5–6)		Yankee Stadium	52,535	79–61
141	September 7	Orioles	10–3	Rogers (6–6)	Mussina (13–7)		Yankee Stadium	47,945	80–61
142	September 9	@ Red Sox	8–6	Banks (1–0)	Lowe (2–5)	Rivera (41)	Fenway Park	32,355	81–61
143	September 10	@ Red Sox	2–5	Sele (13–12)	Wells (14–10)	Gordon (5)	Fenway Park	31,011	81–62
144	September 11	@ Orioles	14–2	Pettitte (17–7)	Key (15–9)		Oriole Park at Camden Yards	47,066	82–62
145	September 12	@ Orioles	13–5	Mendoza (6–6)	Erickson (16–6)		Oriole Park at Camden Yards	47,511	83–62
146	September 13	@ Orioles	1–6	Mussina (14–7)	Rogers (6–7)		Oriole Park at Camden Yards	47,696	83–63
147	September 14	@ Orioles	8–2	Gooden (8–4)	Kamieniecki (9–6)		Oriole Park at Camden Yards	47,264	84–63
148	September 15	Red Sox	7–6	Rivera (5–4)	Corsi (3–2)		Yankee Stadium	25,873	85–63
149	September 16	Red Sox	2–0	Pettitte (18–7)	Wasdin (4–6)	Rivera (42)	Yankee Stadium		86–63
150	September 16	Red Sox	4–3	Banks (2–0)	Checo (0–1)	Rivera (43)	Yankee Stadium	29,145	87–63
151	September 17	Tigers	6–2	Mendoza (7–6)	Moehler (11–11)		Yankee Stadium	19,331	88–63
152	September 18	Tigers	7–9	Jones (4–3)	Borowski (2–3)	Miceli (3)	Yankee Stadium	18,600	88–64
153	September 19	Blue Jays	0–3	Daal (2–2)	Gooden (8–5)	Escobar (13)	Yankee Stadium	31,195	88–65
154	September 20	Blue Jays	4–3	Banks (3–0)	Janzen (1–1)		Yankee Stadium	38,332	89–65
155	September 21	Blue Jays	5–4	Boehringer (3–2)	Almanzar (0–1)		Yankee Stadium	40,038	90–65
156	September 22	Blue Jays	8–1	Wells (15–10)	Hentgen (15–10)		Yankee Stadium	23,380	91–65
157	September 23	@ Indians	9–10	Mesa (4–4)	Nelson (3–7)		Jacobs Field	43,039	91–66
158	September 24	@ Indians	8–4	Gooden (9–5)	Anderson (4–2)		Jacobs Field	42,976	92–66
159	September 25	@ Indians	5–4	Mendoza (8–6)	Shuey (4–2)	Stanton (3)	Jacobs Field	43,004	93–66
160	September 26	@ Tigers	8–2	Rivera (6–4)	Jones (5–4)		Tiger Stadium	29,206	94–66
161	September 27	@ Tigers	6–1	Wells (16–10)	Moehler (11–12)		Tiger Stadium	33,712	95–66
162	September 28	@ Tigers	7–2	Irabu (5–4)	Keagle (3–5)		Tiger Stadium	38,171	96–66

=== Postseason Game log ===
Legend
Yankees Win	Yankees Loss	Game postponed

1997 Postseason Game Log (2–3)
ALDS vs Indians (2–3)

#	Date	Opponent	Score	Win	Loss	Save	Location	Attendance	Record
1	September 30	Indians	8–6	Mendoza (1–0)	Plunk (0–1)	Rivera (1)	Yankee Stadium	57,398	1–0
2	October 2	Indians	5–7	Wright (1–0)	Pettitte (0–1)		Yankee Stadium	57,360	1–1
3	October 4	@ Indians	6–1	Wells (1–0)	Nagy (0–1)		Jacobs Field	45,274	2–1
4	October 5	@ Indians	2–3	Jackson (1–0)	Mendoza (1–1)		Jacobs Field	45,231	2–2
5	October 6	@ Indians	3–4	Wright (2–0)	Pettitte (0–2)	Mesa (1)	Jacobs Field	45,203	2–3

== Player stats ==
=== Starters by position ===
Note: Pos = Position; G = Games played; AB = At bats; H = Hits; Avg. = Batting average; HR = Home runs; RBI = Runs batted in

Pos	Player	G	AB	H	Avg.	HR	RBI
C	Joe Girardi	112	398	105	.264	1	50
1B	Tino Martinez	158	594	176	.296	44	141
2B	Luis Sojo	77	215	66	.307	2	25
SS	Derek Jeter	159	654	190	.291	10	70
3B	Charlie Hayes	100	353	91	.258	11	53
LF	Tim Raines	74	271	87	.321	4	38
CF	Bernie Williams	129	509	167	.328	21	100
RF	Paul O'Neill	149	553	179	.324	21	117
DH	Cecil Fielder	98	361	94	.260	13	61

==== Other batters ====
Note: G = Games played; AB = At bats; H = Hits; Avg. = Batting average; HR = Home runs; RBI = Runs batted in

Player	G	AB	H	Avg.	HR	RBI
Wade Boggs	103	353	103	.292	4	28
Chad Curtis	93	320	93	.291	12	50
Mark Whiten	69	215	57	.265	5	24
Jorge Posada	60	188	47	.250	6	25
Mariano Duncan	50	172	42	.244	1	13
Rey Sánchez	38	138	43	.312	1	15
Pat Kelly	67	120	29	.242	2	10
Mike Stanley	28	87	25	.287	3	12
Scott Pose	54	87	19	.218	0	5
Andy Fox	22	31	7	.226	0	1
Darryl Strawberry	11	29	3	.103	0	2
Iván Cruz	11	20	5	.250	0	3
Pete Incaviglia	5	16	4	.250	0	0
Homer Bush	10	11	4	.364	0	3
Mike Figga	2	4	0	.000	0	0

=== Starting pitchers ===
Note: G = Games pitched; IP = Innings pitched; W = Wins; L = Losses; ERA = Earned run average; SO = Strikeouts

Player	G	IP	W	L	ERA	SO
Andy Pettitte	35	240.1	18	7	2.88	166
David Wells	32	218.0	16	10	4.21	156
David Cone	29	195.0	12	6	2.82	222
Dwight Gooden	20	106.1	9	5	4.91	66

==== Other pitchers ====
Note: G = Games pitched; IP = Innings pitched; W = Wins; L = Losses; ERA = Earned run average; SO = Strikeouts

Player	G	IP	W	L	ERA	SO
Kenny Rogers	31	145.0	6	7	5.65	78
Ramiro Mendoza	39	133.2	8	6	4.24	82
Hideki Irabu	13	53.1	5	4	7.09	56
Willie Banks	5	14.0	3	0	1.93	8

===== Relief pitchers =====
Note: G = Games pitched; W = Wins; L = Losses; SV = Saves; ERA = Earned run average; SO = Strikeouts

Player	G	W	L	SV	ERA	SO
Mariano Rivera	66	6	4	43	1.88	68
Jeff Nelson	77	3	7	2	2.86	81
Mike Stanton	64	6	1	3	2.57	70
Graeme Lloyd	46	1	1	1	3.31	26
Brian Boehringer	34	3	2	0	2.63	53
Jim Mecir	25	0	4	0	5.88	25
David Weathers	10	0	1	0	10.00	4
Danny Rios	2	0	0	0	19.29	1
Joe Borowski	1	0	1	0	9.00	2
Wade Boggs	1	0	0	0	0.00	1

== ALDS ==
=== Game 1 ===
September 30, Yankee Stadium

Team	1	2	3	4	5	6	7	8	9	R	H	E
Cleveland	5	0	0	1	0	0	0	0	0	6	11	0
New York	0	1	0	1	1	5	0	0	X	8	11	0
W: Ramiro Mendoza (1–0) L: Eric Plunk (0–1) SV: Mariano Rivera (1)
HR: CLE – Sandy Alomar Jr. (1) NYY – Tino Martinez (1) Tim Raines (1) Derek Jeter (1) Paul O'Neill (1)

=== Game 2 ===
October 2, Yankee Stadium

Team	1	2	3	4	5	6	7	8	9	R	H	E
Cleveland	0	0	0	5	2	0	0	0	0	7	11	1
New York	3	0	0	0	0	0	0	1	1	5	7	2
W: Jaret Wright (1–0) L: Andy Pettitte (0–1) SV: None
HR: CLE – Matt Williams (1) NYY – Derek Jeter (2)

=== Game 3 ===
October 4, Jacobs Field

Team	1	2	3	4	5	6	7	8	9	R	H	E
New York	1	0	1	4	0	0	0	0	0	6	4	1
Cleveland	0	1	0	0	0	0	0	0	0	1	5	1
W: David Wells (1–0) L: Charles Nagy (0–1) SV: None
HR: CLE – None NYY – Paul O'Neill (2)

=== Game 4 ===
October 5, Jacobs Field

Team	1	2	3	4	5	6	7	8	9	R	H	E
New York	2	0	0	0	0	0	0	0	0	2	9	1
Cleveland	0	1	0	0	0	0	0	1	1	3	9	0
W: Mike Jackson (1–0) L: Ramiro Mendoza (1–1) SV: None
HR: CLE – David Justice (1) Sandy Alomar Jr. (2) NYY – None

=== Game 5 ===
October 6, Jacobs Field

Team	1	2	3	4	5	6	7	8	9	R	H	E
New York	0	0	0	0	2	1	0	0	0	3	12	0
Cleveland	0	0	3	1	0	0	0	0	X	4	7	2
W: Jaret Wright (2–0) L: Andy Pettitte (0–2) SV: José Mesa (1)
HR: CLE – None NYY – None

== Awards and records ==
Don Mattingly's number 23 was retired by the New York Yankees in 1997.

- Tino Martinez, Silver Slugger Award

== Farm system ==
Level	Team	League	Manager
AAA	Columbus Clippers	International League	Stump Merrill
AA	Norwich Navigators	Eastern League	Trey Hillman
A	Tampa Yankees	Florida State League	Lee Mazzilli
A	Greensboro Bats	South Atlantic League	Tom Nieto
A-Short Season	Oneonta Yankees	New York–Penn League	Joe Arnold
Rookie	GCL Yankees	Gulf Coast League	Ken Dominguez
