= 1997 Anaheim Angels season =

Major League Baseball season

1997 Anaheim Angels
- League: American League
- Division: West
- Ballpark: Anaheim Stadium
- City: Anaheim, California
- Record: 84–78 (.519)
- Divisional place: 2nd
- Owner: Gene Autry
- General manager: Bill Bavasi
- Manager: Terry Collins
- Television: Fox Sports West •Sparky Anderson, Steve Physioc; KCAL-9 •Jerry Reuss, Steve Physioc
- Radio: KMPC (AM 710) •Bob Starr, Mario Impemba
- Stats: ESPN.com; Baseball Reference

The 1997 Anaheim Angels season was the 37th season of the Anaheim Angels franchise in the American League, the 32nd in Anaheim, and their 32nd season playing their home games at Anaheim Stadium. The Angels finished second in the American League West with a record of 84 wins and 78 losses. It was the first season for the franchise as the "Anaheim Angels", after playing under the name of the "California Angels" for the previous 31 seasons, plus part of another. It was also the first season that the team introduced a new logo: the word angels on the front of the jerseys (which were now in a vest style) with wings coming out of the A (the winged A was also used on the team's caps). This look would last until 2001 when it was retired immediately after that season.

== Offseason ==
- October 28, 1996: Chili Davis was traded by the Angels to the Kansas City Royals for Mike Bovee and Mark Gubicza.
- November 12, 1996: Todd Van Poppel was selected off waivers by the Anaheim Angels from the Detroit Tigers.
- November 26, 1996: J. T. Snow was traded by the Anaheim Angels to the San Francisco Giants for Allen Watson and Fausto Macey (minors).
- December 5, 1996: Jim Leyritz was traded by the New York Yankees to the Anaheim Angels for players to be named later. The Anaheim Angels sent Jeremy Blevins (minors) (December 9, 1996) and Ryan Kane (minors) (December 9, 1996) to the New York Yankees to complete the trade.
- December 6, 1996: Craig Grebeck was signed as a free agent with the Anaheim Angels.
- March 26, 1997: Todd Van Poppel was released by the Anaheim Angels.
- March 31, 1997: Jim Abbott was released by the Anaheim Angels.

== Regular season ==
- June 17, 1997: The first interleague game between the Anaheim Angels and the Los Angeles Dodgers took place at Dodger Stadium. The rivalry would be known as the Freeway Series. The Dodgers won the game by a score of 4–3.

=== Notable transactions ===
- May 18, 1997: Tony Phillips was traded by the Chicago White Sox with Chad Kreuter to the Anaheim Angels for Chuck McElroy and Jorge Fábregas.
- June 3, 1997: Matt Wise was drafted by the Anaheim Angels in the 6th round of the 1997 amateur draft. Player signed June 8, 1997.
- July 10, 1997: Greg Cadaret was signed as a free agent with the Anaheim Angels.
- July 29, 1997: Jim Leyritz was traded by the Anaheim Angels with a player to be named later to the Texas Rangers for Ken Hill. The Anaheim Angels sent Rob Sasser (October 31, 1997) to the Texas Rangers to complete the trade.
- August 13, 1997: Rickey Henderson was traded by the San Diego Padres to the Anaheim Angels for a player to be named later, Ryan Hancock, and Stevenson Agosto (minors). The Anaheim Angels sent George Arias (August 19, 1997) to the San Diego Padres to complete the trade.

=== Season standings ===
AL West
Team	W	L	Pct.	GB	Home	Road
Seattle Mariners	90	72	.556	—	45‍–‍36	45‍–‍36
Anaheim Angels	84	78	.519	6	46‍–‍36	38‍–‍42
Texas Rangers	77	85	.475	13	39‍–‍42	38‍–‍43
Oakland Athletics	65	97	.401	25	35‍–‍46	30‍–‍51

=== Record vs. opponents ===
1997 American League record Source: MLB Standings Grid – 1997
Team	ANA	BAL	BOS	CWS	CLE	DET	KC	MIL	MIN	NYY	OAK	SEA	TEX	TOR	NL
Anaheim	—	4–7	6–5	6–5	7–4	5–6	6–5	7–4	4–7	4–7	11–1	6–6	8–4	6–5	4–12
Baltimore	7–4	—	5–7	5–6	6–5	6–6	7–4	5–6	10–1	8–4	8–3	7–4	10–1	6–6	8–7
Boston	5–6	7–5	—	3–8	6–5	5–7	3–8	8–3	8–3	4–8	7–4	7–4	3–8	6–6	6–9
Chicago	5–6	6–5	8–3	—	5–7	4–7	11–1	4–7	6–6	2–9	8–3	5–6	3–8	5–6	8–7
Cleveland	4–7	5–6	5–6	7–5	—	6–5	8–3	8–4	8–4	5–6	7–4	3–8	5–6	6–5	9–6
Detroit	6–5	6–6	7–5	7–4	5–6	—	6–5	4–7	4–7	2–10	7–4	4–7	7–4	6–6	8–7
Kansas City	5–6	4–7	8–3	1–11	3–8	5–6	—	6–6	7–5	3–8	3–8	5–6	6–5	5–6	6–9
Milwaukee	4–7	6–5	3–8	7–4	4–8	7–4	6–6	—	5–7	4–7	5–6	5–6	7–4	7–4	8–7
Minnesota	7–4	1–10	3–8	6–6	4–8	7–4	5–7	7–5	—	3–8	7–4	5–6	3–8	3–8	7–8
New York	7–4	4–8	8–4	9–2	6–5	10–2	8–3	7–4	8–3	—	6–5	4–7	7–4	7–5	5–10
Oakland	1–11	3–8	4–7	3–8	4–7	4–7	8–3	6–5	4–7	5–6	—	5–7	5–7	6–5	7–9
Seattle	6–6	4–7	4–7	6–5	8–3	7–4	6–5	6–5	6–5	7–4	7–5	—	8–4	8–3	7–9
Texas	4–8	1–10	8–3	8–3	6–5	4–7	5–6	4–7	8–3	4–7	7–5	4–8	—	4–7	10–6
Toronto	5–6	6–6	6–6	6–5	5–6	6–6	6–5	4–7	8–3	5–7	5–6	3–8	7–4	—	4–11

=== Roster ===
1997 Anaheim Angels
Roster
Pitchers: 61 Mike Bovee; 36 Greg Cadaret; 43 Anthony Chavez; 41 Rich DeLucia; 19 Jason Dickson; 31 Chuck Finley; 44 Kevin Gross; 23 Mark Gubicza; 48 Pep Harris; 21 Shigetoshi Hasegawa; 44 Ken Hill; 65 Mike Holtz; 46 Mike James; 12 Mark Langston; 22 Darrell May; 17 Chuck McElroy; 40 Troy Percival; 62 Matt Perisho; 35 Dennis Springer; 34 Allen Watson; 59 Shad Williams	Catchers: 7 Angelo Encarnacion; 14 Jorge Fábregas; 8 Todd Greene; 6 Chad Kreuter; 13 Jim Leyritz; 20 Chris Turner; Infielders: 5 Luis Alicea; 7 George Arias; 9 Gary DiSarcina; 11 Robert Eenhoorn; 27 Darin Erstad; 4 Craig Grebeck; 10 Dave Hollins; 32 Jack Howell; 73 Tony Phillips	Outfielders: 16 Garret Anderson; 25 Jim Edmonds; 24 Rickey Henderson; 3 Orlando Palmeiro; 15 Tim Salmon; Other batters: 33 Eddie Murray; 18 Randy Velarde	Manager: 1 Terry Collins; Coaches: 57 Mick Billmeyer (Bullpen); 2 Larry Bowa (Third Base); 29 Rod Carew (Hitting); 47 Joe Coleman (Bullpen); 53 Marcel Lachemann (Pitching); 70 Joe Maddon (Bench); 39 Dave Parker (First Base)

== Game log ==
=== Regular season ===
1997 regular season game log: 84–78 (Home: 46–36; Away: 38–42)
April: 12–12 (Home: 7–7; Away: 5–5)

#	Date	Opponent	Score	Win	Loss	Save	Time of Game	Attendance	Record	Box/ Streak
3	April 4	Indians	**W** 8–6 (11)				4:12	17,758	2–1	W2
4	April 5	Indians	L 5–7				3:09	23,913	2–2	L1
5	April 6	Indians	L 8–10				3:24	29,363	2–3	L2
6	April 7	Yankees	L 3–5				3:24	16,514	2–4	L3
7	April 8	Yankees	**W** 10–9 (12)				4:18	17,202	3–4	W1
8	April 9	Yankees	L 5–12				2:52	19,242	3–5	L1
9	April 11	@ Indians	L 3–15				3:12	42,643	3–6	L2
–	April 12	@ Indians	**Postponed (Rain)** (Makeup date: July 28)							
10	April 13	@ Indians	**W** 8–3				3:29	41,218	4–6	W1
11	April 14	@ Yankees	**W** 5–1				2:40	15,082	5–6	W2
12	April 15	@ Yankees	**W** 6–5				3:49	16,944	6–6	W3

May: 16–12 (Home: 10–2; Away: 6–10)

#	Date	Opponent	Score	Win	Loss	Save	Time of Game	Attendance	Record	Box/ Streak
–	May 2	@ White Sox	**Postponed (Rain)** (Makeup date: May 3)							
24 (1)	May 3	@ White Sox								
25 (2)	May 3	@ White Sox								
26	May 4	@ White Sox								
28	May 5	@ Orioles	**W** 7–2				3:00	41,296	14–14	W1
29	May 6	@ Orioles	L 4–8				2:43	37,150	14–15	L1
30	May 7	@ Orioles	L 0–3				2:43	43,858	14–16	L2
34	May 12		White Sox							
35	May 13		White Sox							
36	May 14	Orioles	**W** 6–5				2:55	15,780	17–19	W3
37	May 15	Orioles	**W** 3–2				2:58	15,966	18–19	W4
41	May 19	Mariners	L 4–13				3:08	17,279	21–20	L1
42	May 20	Mariners	**W** 11–9				3:27	17,492	22–20	W1
43	May 21	Mariners	**W** 18–3				3:18	20,295	23–20	W2

June: 13–15 (Home: 6–5; Away: 7–10)

#	Date	Opponent	Score	Win	Loss	Save	Time of Game	Attendance	Record	Box/ Streak
63	June 12	Padres	**W** 8–4				3:11	22,164	34–29	W1
64	June 13	Padres	L 7–8 (14)				5:03	24,664	34–30	L1
65	June 14	Giants	L 3–10				3:21	27,875	34–31	L2
66	June 15	Giants	L 1–4				3:28	30,404	34–32	L3
67	June 17	@ Dodgers	L 3–4				2:55	41,428	34–33	L4
68	June 18	@ Dodgers	L 5–7				3:10	45,953	34–34	L5
76	June 26	@ Mariners	L 3–6				2:51	31,248	40–36	L2
77	June 27	@ Mariners	L 1–8				2:42	32,247	40–37	L3
78	June 28	@ Mariners	**W** 6–1				2:46	38,750	41–37	W1
79	June 29	@ Mariners	L 2–3				2:55	42,760	41–38	L1
80	June 30	@ Rockies	L 7–11				3:32	48,359	41–39	L2

July: 19–9 (Home: 8–5; Away: 11–4)

#	Date	Opponent	Score	Win	Loss	Save	Time of Game	Attendance	Record	Box/ Streak
81	July 1	@ Rockies	**W** 4–1				2:53	48,235	42–39	W1
82	July 2	Dodgers	L 4–5				3:38	34,507	42–40	L1
83	July 3	Dodgers	L 2–8				3:33	35,295	42–41	L2
84	July 4	Mariners	L 3–7				2:50	34,839	42–42	L3
85	July 5	Mariners	**W** 5–4				3:17	26,301	43–42	W1
86	July 6	Mariners	**W** 8–0				2:43	22,916	44–42	W2
**68th All-Star Game in Cleveland, OH**
98	July 22	@ Yankees	L 2–9				2:45	25,816	54–44	L1
99	July 23	@ Yankees	L 4–5				3:07	26,750	54–45	L2
–	July 24	@ Yankees	**Postponed (Rain; Site change)** (Makeup date: August 20)							
104 (1)	July 28	@ Indians	**W** 2–0				2:37	43,033	57–47	W1
105 (2)	July 28	@ Indians	**W** 10–7				4:00	42,857	58–47	W2
106	July 29	@ Indians	**W** 7–2				2:31	42,975	59–47	W3
107	July 30	@ Indians	**W** 5–2				3:09	42,898	60–47	W4
108	July 31	White Sox								

August: 14–15 (Home: 10–8; Away: 4–7)

#	Date	Opponent	Score	Win	Loss	Save	Time of Game	Attendance	Record	Box/ Streak
109	August 1	White Sox								
110	August 2	White Sox								
111	August 3	White Sox								
115	August 8	Orioles	L 2–6				3:10	24,944	65–50	L1
116	August 9	Orioles	**W** 4–3				3:05	32,207	66–50	W1
117	August 10	Orioles	L 3–4				3:33	34,060	66–51	L1
118	August 12	@ White Sox								
119	August 13	@ White Sox								
122	August 16	@ Orioles	L 9–10				3:25	47,815	68–54	L1
123	August 17	@ Orioles	L 4–5 (10)				3:47	47,340	68–55	L2
124	August 18	@ Orioles	L 1–2				3:29	47,804	68–56	L3
125	August 19	Yankees	**W** 12–4				3:00	22,596	69–56	W1
126 (1)	August 20	Yankees	L 3–7				3:04		69–57	L1
127 (2)	August 20	Yankees	L 5–8				3:24	32,343	69–58	L2
128	August 21	Yankees	L 3–4 (12)				4:11	27,102	69–59	L3
132	August 26	Indians	**W** 8–7				3:07	21,012	72–60	W1
133	August 27	Indians	L 4–10				3:03	20,140	72–61	L1
134	August 28	@ Padres	L 2–9				2:41	18,203	72–62	L2
135	August 29	@ Padres	**W** 3–1				2:37	60,230	73–62	W1
136	August 30	@ Giants	L 3–7				2:43	26,200	73–63	L1
137	August 31	@ Giants	**W** 7–4				3:15	24,751	74–63	W1

September: 10–15 (Home: 5–9; Away: 5–6)

#	Date	Opponent	Score	Win	Loss	Save	Time of Game	Attendance	Record	Box/ Streak
138	September 1	Rockies	L 1–4				2:55	19,614	74–64	L1
139	September 2	Rockies	L 2–7				3:01	18,266	74–65	L2
157	September 23	@ Mariners	L 3–4				3:01	52,884	82–75	L1
158	September 24	@ Mariners	**W** 9–3				2:51	41,975	83–75	W1

Legend: = Win = Loss = Postponement
Bold = Angels team member

== Player stats ==
=== Batting ===
==== Starters by position ====
Note: Pos = Position; G = Games played; AB = At bats; H = Hits; Avg. = Batting average; HR = Home runs; RBI = Runs batted in

Pos	Player	G	AB	H	Avg.	HR	RBI
C	Chad Kreuter	70	218	51	.234	4	18
1B	Darin Erstad	139	539	161	.299	16	77
2B	Luis Alicea	128	388	98	.253	5	37
3B	Dave Hollins	149	572	165	.288	16	85
SS	Gary DiSarcina	154	549	135	.246	4	47
LF	Garret Anderson	154	624	189	.303	8	92
CF	Jim Edmonds	133	502	146	.291	26	80
RF	Tim Salmon	157	582	172	.296	33	129
DH	Eddie Murray	46	160	35	.219	3	15

==== Other batters ====
Note: G = Games played; AB = At bats; H = Hits; Avg. = Batting average; HR = Home runs; RBI = Runs batted in

Player	G	AB	H	Avg.	HR	RBI
Tony Phillips	105	405	107	.264	6	48
Jim Leyritz	84	294	81	.276	11	50
Jack Howell	77	174	45	.259	14	34
Orlando Palmeiro	74	134	29	.216	0	8
Craig Grebeck	63	126	34	.270	1	6
Todd Greene	34	124	36	.290	9	24
Rickey Henderson	32	115	21	.183	2	7
Jorge Fábregas	21	38	3	.079	0	3
Chris Turner	13	23	6	.261	1	2
Robert Eenhoorn	11	20	7	.350	1	6
Angelo Encarnación	11	17	7	.412	1	4
George Arias	3	6	2	.333	0	1
Randy Velarde	1	0	0	----	0	0

=== Pitching ===
==== Starting pitchers ====
Note: G = Games pitched; IP = Innings pitched; W = Wins; L = Losses; ERA = Earned run average; SO = Strikeouts

Player	G	IP	W	L	ERA	SO
Jason Dickson	33	203.2	13	9	4.29	115
Allen Watson	35	199.0	12	12	4.93	141
Dennis Springer	32	194.2	9	9	5.18	75
Chuck Finley	25	164.0	13	6	4.23	155
Ken Hill	12	79.0	4	4	3.65	38
Mark Langston	9	48.0	2	4	5.85	30
Mark Gubicza	2	5.0	0	1	25.07	5

==== Other pitchers ====
Note: G = Games pitched; IP = Innings pitched; W = Wins; L = Losses; ERA = Earned run average; SO = Strikeouts

Player	G	IP	W	L	ERA	SO
Shigetoshi Hasegawa	50	116.2	3	7	3.93	83
Matt Perisho	11	45.0	0	2	6.00	35
Kevin Gross	12	25.0	2	1	6.75	20

==== Relief pitchers ====
Note: G = Games pitched; W = Wins; L = Losses; SV = Saves; ERA = Earned run average; SO = Strikeouts

Player	G	W	L	SV	ERA	SO
Troy Percival	55	5	5	27	3.46	72
Mike Holtz	66	3	4	2	3.32	40
Pep Harris	61	5	4	0	3.62	56
Mike James	58	5	5	7	4.31	57
Rich DeLucia	33	6	4	3	3.61	42
Darrell May	29	2	1	0	5.23	42
Greg Cadaret	15	0	0	0	3.29	11
Chuck McElroy	13	0	0	0	3.45	18
Anthony Chavez	7	0	0	0	0.93	10
Mike Bovee	3	0	0	0	5.40	5
Shad Williams	1	0	0	0	0.00	0

== Farm system ==
Level	Team	League	Manager
AAA	Vancouver Canadians	Pacific Coast League	Bruce Hines
AA	Midland Angels	Texas League	Mitch Seoane
A	Lake Elsinore Storm	California League	Don Long
A	Cedar Rapids Kernels	Midwest League	Mario Mendoza
A-Short Season	Boise Hawks	Northwest League	Tom Kotchman
Rookie	Butte Copper Kings	Pioneer League	Bill Lachemann

Records
Preceded by 1996	Anaheim Angels seasons 1997	Succeeded by 1998
