= 1997 Texas Rangers season =

1997 Texas Rangers
- League: American League
- Division: West
- Ballpark: The Ballpark in Arlington
- City: Arlington, Texas
- Record: 77–85 (.475)
- Divisional place: 3rd
- Owners: George W. Bush
- General managers: Doug Melvin
- Managers: Johnny Oates
- Television: KXTX-TV; KXAS-TV; Fox Sports Southwest (Mark Holtz, Tom Grieve, Bill Jones)
- Radio: KRLD (Eric Nadel, Brad Sham ) KMRT (Luis Mayoral, Josue Perez)

The 1997 Texas Rangers season was the 37th of the Texas Rangers franchise overall, their 26th in Arlington as the Rangers, and their 4th season at The Ballpark in Arlington. The Rangers finished third in the American League West with a record of 77 wins and 85 losses. Despite not making the playoffs the club would set an all-time attendance record of over 2.945 million fans, which would be the franchise's best until 2011.

On a somber note, the club would lose long-time radio broadcaster Mark Holtz to leukemia during the season; however, in his final game in May the Rangers won, allowing him to sign off one final time with his trademark "Hello Win Column!".

== Offseason ==
- December 10, 1996: Billy Ripken was signed as a free agent by the Rangers.
- December 16, 1996: Scott Bailes was signed as a free agent with the Texas Rangers.
- December 19, 1996: Mike Simms was signed as a free agent by the Rangers.
- March 27, 1997: Dave Silvestri was selected off waivers by the Rangers from the Seattle Mariners.

== Regular season ==
- June 12, 1997: The first interleague game took place as the Texas Rangers hosted the San Francisco Giants at The Ballpark in Arlington (now Globe Life Park).

=== Opening Day starters ===
- Mark McLemore, 2B
- Iván Rodríguez, C
- Rusty Greer, LF
- Dean Palmer, 3B
- Lee Stevens, 1B
- Mickey Tettleton, DH
- Warren Newson, RF
- Damon Buford, CF
- Benji Gil, SS

=== Season standings ===
AL West
Team	W	L	Pct.	GB	Home	Road
Seattle Mariners	90	72	.556	—	45‍–‍36	45‍–‍36
Anaheim Angels	84	78	.519	6	46‍–‍36	38‍–‍42
Texas Rangers	77	85	.475	13	39‍–‍42	38‍–‍43
Oakland Athletics	65	97	.401	25	35‍–‍46	30‍–‍51

=== Record vs. opponents ===
1997 American League record Source: MLB Standings Grid – 1997
Team	ANA	BAL	BOS	CWS	CLE	DET	KC	MIL	MIN	NYY	OAK	SEA	TEX	TOR	NL
Anaheim	—	4–7	6–5	6–5	7–4	5–6	6–5	7–4	4–7	4–7	11–1	6–6	8–4	6–5	4–12
Baltimore	7–4	—	5–7	5–6	6–5	6–6	7–4	5–6	10–1	8–4	8–3	7–4	10–1	6–6	8–7
Boston	5–6	7–5	—	3–8	6–5	5–7	3–8	8–3	8–3	4–8	7–4	7–4	3–8	6–6	6–9
Chicago	5–6	6–5	8–3	—	5–7	4–7	11–1	4–7	6–6	2–9	8–3	5–6	3–8	5–6	8–7
Cleveland	4–7	5–6	5–6	7–5	—	6–5	8–3	8–4	8–4	5–6	7–4	3–8	5–6	6–5	9–6
Detroit	6–5	6–6	7–5	7–4	5–6	—	6–5	4–7	4–7	2–10	7–4	4–7	7–4	6–6	8–7
Kansas City	5–6	4–7	8–3	1–11	3–8	5–6	—	6–6	7–5	3–8	3–8	5–6	6–5	5–6	6–9
Milwaukee	4–7	6–5	3–8	7–4	4–8	7–4	6–6	—	5–7	4–7	5–6	5–6	7–4	7–4	8–7
Minnesota	7–4	1–10	3–8	6–6	4–8	7–4	5–7	7–5	—	3–8	7–4	5–6	3–8	3–8	7–8
New York	7–4	4–8	8–4	9–2	6–5	10–2	8–3	7–4	8–3	—	6–5	4–7	7–4	7–5	5–10
Oakland	1–11	3–8	4–7	3–8	4–7	4–7	8–3	6–5	4–7	5–6	—	5–7	5–7	6–5	7–9
Seattle	6–6	4–7	4–7	6–5	8–3	7–4	6–5	6–5	6–5	7–4	7–5	—	8–4	8–3	7–9
Texas	4–8	1–10	8–3	8–3	6–5	4–7	5–6	4–7	8–3	4–7	7–5	4–8	—	4–7	10–6
Toronto	5–6	6–6	6–6	6–5	5–6	6–6	6–5	4–7	8–3	5–7	5–6	3–8	7–4	—	4–11

=== Notable transactions ===
- April 16, 1997: Alex Diaz was signed as a free agent by the Rangers.
- June 20, 1997: Todd Van Poppel was signed as a free agent by the Rangers.
- July 29, 1997: Ken Hill was traded by the Rangers to the Anaheim Angels for Jim Leyritz and a player to be named later. The Angels completed the deal by sending Rob Sasser to the Rangers on October 31.

==== Draft picks ====
- June 3, 1997: Mike Lamb was drafted by the Rangers in the 7th round of the 1997 Major League Baseball draft. Player signed June 6, 1997.

=== Roster ===
1997 Texas Rangers
Roster
Pitchers: 48 José Alberro; 58 Scott Bailes; 33 John Burkett; 46 Terry Clark; 52 Bryan Eversgerd; 53 Eric Gunderson; 32 Rick Helling; 55 Wilson Heredia; 31 Xavier Hernandez; 44 Ken Hill; 45 Eric Moody; 28 Darren Oliver; 46 Danny Patterson; 59 Roger Pavlik; 60 Julio Santana; 47 Tanyon Sturtze; 52 Ed Vosberg; 35 John Wetteland; 27 Matt Whiteside; 36 Bobby Witt	Catchers: 6 Kevin Brown; 13 Jim Leyritz; 10 Henry Mercedes; 7 Iván Rodríguez; Infielders: 1 Domingo Cedeño; 22 Will Clark; 30 Hanley Frias; 23 Benji Gil; 3 Mark McLemore; 16 Dean Palmer; 9 Billy Ripken; 14 Dave Silvestri; 11 Lee Stevens; 4 Fernando Tatís	Outfielders: 2 Damon Buford; 24 Mike Devereaux; 14 Alex Diaz; 19 Juan González; 24 Tom Goodwin; 29 Rusty Greer; 21 Warren Newson; 37 Marc Sagmoen; 18 Mike Simms; Other batters: 15 Mickey Tettleton	Manager: 26 Johnny Oates; Coaches: 17 Dick Bosman (Pitching); 20 Bucky Dent (Bench); 25 Larry Hardy (Bullpen); 8 Rudy Jaramillo (Hitting); 12 Ed Napoleon (First Base); 5 Jerry Narron (Third Base)

== Player stats ==
=== Batting ===
==== Starters by position ====
Note: Pos = Position; G = Games played; AB = At bats; H = Hits; Avg. = Batting average; HR = Home runs; RBI = Runs batted in

Pos	Player	G	AB	H	Avg.	HR	RBI
C	Iván Rodríguez	150	597	187	.313	20	77
1B	Will Clark	110	393	128	.326	12	51
2B	Mark McLemore	89	349	91	.261	1	25
SS	Benji Gil	110	317	71	.224	5	31
3B	Dean Palmer	94	355	87	.245	14	55
LF	Rusty Greer	157	601	193	.321	26	87
CF	Damon Buford	122	366	82	.224	8	39
RF	Warren Newson	81	169	36	.213	10	23
DH	Juan González	133	533	158	.296	42	131

==== Other batters ====
Note: G = Games played; AB = At bats; H = Hits; Avg. = Batting average; HR = Home runs; RBI = Runs batted in

Player	G	AB	H	Avg.	HR	RBI
Lee Stevens	137	426	128	.300	21	74
Domingo Cedeño	113	365	103	.282	4	36
Fernando Tatis	60	223	57	.256	8	29
Tom Goodwin	53	207	49	.237	0	17
Billy Ripken	71	203	56	.276	3	24
Mike Simms	59	111	28	.252	5	22
Alex Diaz	28	90	20	.222	2	12
Jim Leyritz	37	85	24	.282	0	14
Mike Devereaux	29	72	15	.208	0	7
Henry Mercedes	23	47	10	.213	0	4
Mickey Tettleton	17	44	4	.091	3	4
Marc Sagmoen	21	43	6	.140	1	4
Hanley Frias	14	26	5	.192	0	1
Kevin Brown	4	5	2	.400	1	1
Dave Silvestri	2	4	0	.000	0	0

=== Pitching ===
==== Starting pitchers ====
Note: G = Games pitched; IP = Innings pitched; W = Wins; L = Losses; ERA = Earned run average; SO = Strikeouts

Player	G	IP	W	L	ERA	SO
Bobby Witt	34	209.0	12	12	4.82	121
Darren Oliver	32	201.1	13	12	4.20	104
John Burkett	30	189.1	9	12	4.56	139
Ken Hill	19	111.0	5	8	5.19	68
Roger Pavlik	11	57.2	3	5	4.37	35
Rick Helling	10	55.0	3	3	4.58	46

==== Other pitchers ====
Note: G = Games pitched; IP = Innings pitched; W = Wins; L = Losses; ERA = Earned run average; SO = Strikeouts

Player	G	IP	W	L	ERA	SO
Julio Santana	30	104.0	4	6	6.75	64
Tanyon Sturtze	9	32.2	1	1	8.27	18
Terry Clark	9	30.2	1	4	5.87	11
Jose Alberro	10	28.1	0	3	7.94	11

==== Relief pitchers ====
Note: G = Games pitched; W = Wins; L = Losses; SV = Saves; ERA = Earned run average; SO = Strikeouts

Player	G	W	L	SV	ERA	SO
John Wetteland	61	7	2	31	1.94	63
Eric Gunderson	60	2	1	1	3.26	31
Danny Patterson	54	10	6	1	3.42	69
Xavier Hernandez	44	0	4	0	4.56	36
Matt Whiteside	42	4	1	0	5.08	44
Ed Vosberg	42	1	2	0	4.61	29
Scott Bailes	24	1	0	0	2.86	14
Wilson Heredia	10	1	0	0	3.20	8
Eric Moody	10	0	1	0	4.26	12
Bryan Eversgerd	3	0	2	0	20.25	2

== Awards and honors ==
- Juan González, Silver Slugger Award
- Iván Rodríguez, C, Gold Glove
- Iván Rodríguez, Silver Slugger Award

All-Star Game

== Farm system ==
Level	Team	League	Manager
AAA	Oklahoma City 89ers	American Association	Greg Biagini
AA	Tulsa Drillers	Texas League	Bobby Jones
A	Charlotte Rangers	Florida State League	Butch Wynegar
Rookie	Pulaski Rangers	Appalachian League	Julio Cruz
Rookie	GCL Rangers	Gulf Coast League	Jim Byrd
