= 1997 Detroit Tigers season =

Major League Baseball season

1997 Detroit Tigers
- League: American League
- Division: East
- Ballpark: Tiger Stadium
- City: Detroit, Michigan
- Record: 79–83 (.488)
- Divisional place: 3rd
- Owners: Mike Ilitch
- General managers: Randy Smith
- Managers: Buddy Bell
- Television: WKBD (Ernie Harwell, Al Kaline, Jim Price); PASS (Ernie Harwell, Jim Price, Fred McLeod)
- Radio: WJR (Frank Beckmann, Lary Sorensen)

The 1997 Detroit Tigers season was the team's 97th season and the 86th season at Tiger Stadium. The Tigers finished in third place in the American League East with a record of 79–83 (.488), an improvement of 26 games over the previous season. They were outscored by their opponents 790 to 784. The Tigers drew 1,365,157 fans to Tiger Stadium in 1997, ranking 13th of the 14 teams in the American League.

This was the Tigers' final year in the AL East. To make room for the expansion Tampa Bay Devil Rays, the team moved from the AL East to the AL Central. On July 27, 1997, the Detroit Tigers retired pitcher Hal Newhouser's number 16.

== Offseason ==
- January 9, 1997: Vince Coleman signed as a free agent with the Detroit Tigers.

== Regular season ==
=== Season standings ===
AL East
Team	W	L	Pct.	GB	Home	Road
Baltimore Orioles	98	64	.605	—	46‍–‍35	52‍–‍29
New York Yankees	96	66	.593	2	47‍–‍33	49‍–‍33
Detroit Tigers	79	83	.488	19	42‍–‍39	37‍–‍44
Boston Red Sox	78	84	.481	20	39‍–‍42	39‍–‍42
Toronto Blue Jays	76	86	.469	22	42‍–‍39	34‍–‍47

=== Record vs. opponents ===
1997 American League record Source: MLB Standings Grid – 1997
Team	ANA	BAL	BOS	CWS	CLE	DET	KC	MIL	MIN	NYY	OAK	SEA	TEX	TOR	NL
Anaheim	—	4–7	6–5	6–5	7–4	5–6	6–5	7–4	4–7	4–7	11–1	6–6	8–4	6–5	4–12
Baltimore	7–4	—	5–7	5–6	6–5	6–6	7–4	5–6	10–1	8–4	8–3	7–4	10–1	6–6	8–7
Boston	5–6	7–5	—	3–8	6–5	5–7	3–8	8–3	8–3	4–8	7–4	7–4	3–8	6–6	6–9
Chicago	5–6	6–5	8–3	—	5–7	4–7	11–1	4–7	6–6	2–9	8–3	5–6	3–8	5–6	8–7
Cleveland	4–7	5–6	5–6	7–5	—	6–5	8–3	8–4	8–4	5–6	7–4	3–8	5–6	6–5	9–6
Detroit	6–5	6–6	7–5	7–4	5–6	—	6–5	4–7	4–7	2–10	7–4	4–7	7–4	6–6	8–7
Kansas City	5–6	4–7	8–3	1–11	3–8	5–6	—	6–6	7–5	3–8	3–8	5–6	6–5	5–6	6–9
Milwaukee	4–7	6–5	3–8	7–4	4–8	7–4	6–6	—	5–7	4–7	5–6	5–6	7–4	7–4	8–7
Minnesota	7–4	1–10	3–8	6–6	4–8	7–4	5–7	7–5	—	3–8	7–4	5–6	3–8	3–8	7–8
New York	7–4	4–8	8–4	9–2	6–5	10–2	8–3	7–4	8–3	—	6–5	4–7	7–4	7–5	5–10
Oakland	1–11	3–8	4–7	3–8	4–7	4–7	8–3	6–5	4–7	5–6	—	5–7	5–7	6–5	7–9
Seattle	6–6	4–7	4–7	6–5	8–3	7–4	6–5	6–5	6–5	7–4	7–5	—	8–4	8–3	7–9
Texas	4–8	1–10	8–3	8–3	6–5	4–7	5–6	4–7	8–3	4–7	7–5	4–8	—	4–7	10–6
Toronto	5–6	6–6	6–6	6–5	5–6	6–6	6–5	4–7	8–3	5–7	5–6	3–8	7–4	—	4–11

=== Transactions ===
- April 8, 1997: Bob Hamelin was signed as a free agent with the Detroit Tigers.
- April 16, 1997: Vince Coleman was released by the Detroit Tigers.

=== Roster ===
1997 Detroit Tigers
Roster
Pitchers: 52 José Bautista; 20 Willie Blair; 26 Doug Brocail; 19 John Cummings; 58 Glenn Dishman; 55 Roberto Durán; 54 Eddie Gaillard; 42 Fernando Hernández; 46 Kevin Jarvis; 59 Todd Jones; 57 Greg Keagle; 40 Felipe Lira; 32 Dan Miceli; 38 Brian Moehler; 27 Mike Myers; 28 Omar Olivares; 50 Tim Pugh; 49 A. J. Sager; 28 Scott Sanders; 22 Justin Thompson	Catchers: 33 Raul Casanova; 10 Marcus Jensen; 10 Brian Johnson; 8 Matt Walbeck; Infielders: 29 Frank Catalanotto; 17 Tony Clark; 37 Deivi Cruz; 9 Damion Easley; 24 Travis Fryman; 41 Bob Hamelin; 14 Orlando Miller; 7 Jody Reed	Outfielders: 39 Kimera Bartee; 29 Vince Coleman; 34 Juan Encarnación; 43 Joe Hall; 4 Bobby Higginson; 21 Brian Hunter; 53 Jimmy Hurst; 12 Phil Nevin; 30 Melvin Nieves; 36 Curtis Pride; 44 Bubba Trammell	Manager: 25 Buddy Bell; Coaches: 35 Rick Adair (Pitching); 31 Larry Herndon (Hitting); 13 Perry Hill (Third Base); 18 Fred Kendall (Bullpen); 15 Larry Parrish (Bench); 48 Jerry White (First Base)

=== Game log ===
Legend
Tigers win	Tigers loss	Game postponed

Game log
April

#	Date	Opponent	Score	Win	Loss	Save	Attendance	Record
1	April 1	at Minnesota Twins	7-5	Naulty	Miceli	Aguilera	43,216	0-1
2	April 3	at Minnesota Twins	7-6	Aguilera	Jones		10,827	0-2
3	April 3	at Minnesota Twins	10-6	Ritchie	Blair	Naulty	11,533	0-3
4	April 4	at Boston Red Sox	8-7	Jones	Levine	Sager	38,560	1-3
5	April 5	at Boston Red Sox	15-12	Blair	Castillo	Jones	21,956	2-3
6	April 6	at Boston Red Sox	5-3	Navarro	Brocail	Hernandez	19,259	2-4
7	April 7	Minnesota Twins	10-4	Thompson	Rodriguez		42,749	3-4
8	April 9	Minnesota Twins	10-5	Cummings	Ritchie		6,477	4-4
9	April 10	Minnesota Twins	7-3	Aldred	Blair		6,381	4-5
10	April 11	Boston Red Sox	5-4	Olivares	Drabek	Jones	7,598	5-5
11	April 13	Boston Red Sox	11-8	Hernandez	Lira		0	5-6
12	April 13	Boston Red Sox	4-2	Sager	Hernandez		10,818	6-6
13	April 14	at Milwaukee Brewers	7-0	Eldred	Moehler		6,079	6-7
14	April 15	at Milwaukee Brewers	3-1	Blair	Karl	Jones	5,891	7-7
15	April 16	Seattle Mariners	7-3	Johnson	Sager		8,090	7-8
16	April 17	Seattle Mariners	8-6	Fassero	Bautista	Charlton	8,973	7-9
17	April 18	Oakland Athletics	9-5	Groom	Myers		7,748	7-10
18	April 19	Oakland Athletics	7-1	Adams	Thompson		10,592	7-11
19	April 20	Oakland Athletics	9-2	Moehler	Karsay		9,281	8-11
20	April 21	at Texas Rangers	7-6	Sager	Vosberg	Miceli	21,562	9-11
21	April 23	at Texas Rangers	2-1	Wetteland	Brocail		35,230	9-12
22	April 24	at Texas Rangers	4-2	Pavlik	Thompson	Wetteland	31,902	9-13
23	April 25	at Anaheim Angels	8-3	Dickson	Lira		30,464	9-14
24	April 26	at Anaheim Angels	2-0	Moehler	Finley		30,872	10-14
25	April 27	at Anaheim Angels	6-5	James	Myers		16,409	10-15
26	April 29	Milwaukee Brewers	2-1	Eldred	Olivares	Jones	8,195	10-16
27	April 30	Milwaukee Brewers	8-4	Thompson	Karl		12,888	11-16

May

#	Date	Opponent	Score	Win	Loss	Save	Attendance	Record
28	May 3	at Cleveland Indians	7-6	Plunk	Brocail		42,469	11-17
29	May 4	at Cleveland Indians	2-0	Blair	Nagy	Brocail	42,387	12-17
30	May 5	at Toronto Blue Jays	3-1	Clemens	Olivares		27,169	12-18
31	May 6	at Toronto Blue Jays	2-1	Crabtree	Jones		26,294	12-19
32	May 7	Kansas City Royals	12-3	Lira	Pittsley		7,949	13-19
33	May 8	Kansas City Royals	4-0	Belcher	Moehler		16,243	13-20
34	May 9	Cleveland Indians	5-0	Nagy	Sager		20,393	13-21
35	May 10	Cleveland Indians	6-0	Olivares	Colon		30,578	14-21
36	May 11	Cleveland Indians	11-3	Thompson	Hershiser		19,869	15-21
37	May 13	Toronto Blue Jays	4-0	Lira	Guzman		9,992	16-21
38	May 14	Toronto Blue Jays	7-2	Belcher	Moehler		11,788	16-22
39	May 15	at Kansas City Royals	10-9	Nagy	Sager		18,160	16-23
40	May 16	at Kansas City Royals	10-2	Olivares	Colon		17,787	17-23
41	May 17	at Kansas City Royals	9-2	Thompson	Hershiser		22,891	18-23
42	May 18	at Kansas City Royals	6-5	Lira	Guzman		15,333	19-23
43	May 20	at Baltimore Orioles	4-3	Hentgen	Moehler		48,003	19-24
44	May 21	at Baltimore Orioles	2-0	Erickson	Thompson	Myers	47,877	19-25
45	May 23	Texas Rangers	7-1	Moehler	Oliver		16,017	20-25
46	May 24	Texas Rangers	8-4	Hill	Pugh		10,797	20-26
47	May 25	Texas Rangers	13-5	Lira	Witt	Sager	13,451	21-26
48	May 26	Anaheim Angels	6-0	Olivares	Finley		12,562	22-26
49	May 27	Anaheim Angels	6-2	Thompson	Perisho	Myers	8,042	23-26
50	May 28	Baltimore Orioles	8-1	Key	Moehler	Boskie	10,692	23-27
51	May 30	at Seattle Mariners	5-2	Lira	Fassero	Jones	32,305	24-27
52	May 31	at Seattle Mariners	4-2	Olivares	Wolcott	Jones	57,118	25-27

June

#	Date	Opponent	Score	Win	Loss	Save	Attendance	Record
53	June 1	at Seattle Mariners	4-1	Sanders	Thompson	Ayala	39,841	25-28
54	June 2	at Oakland Athletics	8-7	Moehler	Karsay	Brocail	6,480	26-28
55	June 3	at Oakland Athletics	9-8	Small	Myers	Johnson	10,134	26-29
56	June 5	Seattle Mariners	14-6	Fassero	Lira		12,572	26-30
57	June 6	Seattle Mariners	6-3	Lowe	Olivares	Ayala	25,547	26-31
58	June 7	Seattle Mariners	3-1	Thompson	Wolcott	Jones	18,896	27-31
59	June 8	Seattle Mariners	2-0	Johnson	Moehler	Ayala	20,287	27-32
60	June 10	Oakland Athletics	6-4	Blair	Prieto	Jones	10,019	28-32
61	June 11	Oakland Athletics	4-2	Brocail	Small	Jones	11,534	29-32
62	June 13	at Montreal Expos	4-3	Perez	Olivares	Urbina	20,333	29-33
63	June 14	at Montreal Expos	1-0	Martinez	Thompson		21,127	29-34
64	June 15	at Montreal Expos	10-2	Juden	Moehler		18,534	29-35
65	June 16	Florida Marlins	7-3	Brown	Blair		23,874	29-36
66	June 17	Florida Marlins	3-2	Alfonseca	Jones	Nen	13,351	29-37
67	June 18	Florida Marlins	6-2	Olivares	Leiter		14,043	30-37
68	June 20	Boston Red Sox	12-6	Thompson	Wakefield	Sager	20,091	31-37
69	June 21	Boston Red Sox	15-4	Bautisa	Eshelman		20,599	32-37
70	June 22	Boston Red Sox	2-1	Gordon	Blair	Slocumb	19,477	32-38
71	June 23	New York Yankees	5-2	Cone	Lira	Rivera	14,556	32-39
72	June 24	New York Yankees	12-9	Lloyd	Myers	Rivera	15,872	32-40
73	June 25	New York Yankees	3-1	Stanton	Thompson	Rivera	15,348	32-41
74	June 26	at Boston Red Sox	10-6	Moehler	Eshelman		31,878	33-41
75	June 27	at Boston Red Sox	2-1	Miceli	Hammond	Jones	26,753	34-41
76	June 28	at Boston Red Sox	9-2	Lira	Sele		30,886	35-41
77	June 29	at Boston Red Sox	8-6	Wasdin	Bautista	Slocumb	30,844	35-42
78	June 30	New York Mets	14-0	Thompson	Clark		15,009	36-42

July

#	Date	Opponent	Score	Win	Loss	Save	Attendance	Record
79	July 1	New York Mets	8-6	Moehler	Jones	Jones	14,849	37-42
80	July 2	New York Mets	9-7	Blair	Mlicki	Jones	16,211	38-42
81	July 3	Baltimore Orioles	10-1	Key	Lira		13,209	38-43
82	July 4	Baltimore Orioles	4-3	Rhodes	Keagle	Myers	0	38-44
83	July 4	Baltimore Orioles	11-8	Bautista	Mills	Jones	30,100	39-44
84	July 5	Baltimore Orioles	6-5	Miceli	Orosco	Jones	37,074	40-44
85	July 6	Baltimore Orioles	14-9	Blair	Erickson		18,197	41-44
86	July 10	at New York Yankees	10-3	Irabu	Olivares		51,901	41-45
87	July 11	at New York Yankees	3-0	Pettite	Moehler	Rivera	27,135	41-46
88	July 12	at New York Yankees	6-2	Cone	Lira	Rivera	39,681	41-47
89	July 13	at New York Yankees	3-1	Blair	Gooden	Jones	36,679	42-47
90	July 14	at Boston Red Sox	18-4	Suppan	Jarvis		21,997	42-48
91	July 15	at Boston Red Sox	7-5	Jones	Wasdin		25,822	43-48
92	July 16	at Anaheim Angels	5-3	Finley	Moehler	Percival	16,570	43-49
93	July 17	at Anaheim Angels	9-4	Springer	Lira		19,246	43-50
94	July 18	at Texas Rangers	5-4	Blair	Witt	Jones	35,074	44-50
95	July 19	at Texas Rangers	6-5	Brocail	Hernandez	Jones	45,025	45-50
96	July 20	at Texas Rangers	7-6	Wetteland	Sager		33,655	45-51
97	July 21	Boston Red Sox	3-0	Alvarez	Thompson	Hernandez	14,260	45-52
98	July 22	Boston Red Sox	6-3	Moehler	Darwin	Jones	16,895	46-52
99	July 23	Boston Red Sox	8-6	Blair	Baldwin	Jones	18,525	47-52
100	July 25	Milwaukee Brewers	6-1	Karl	Sanders		22,532	47-53
101	July 26	Milwaukee Brewers	3-1	Florie	Thompson	Fetters	20,057	47-54
102	July 27	Milwaukee Brewers	11-7	Eldred	Moehler	Reyes	20,318	47-55
103	July 29	at Boston Red Sox	3-1	Blair	Baldwin		20,380	48-55
104	July 30	at Boston Red Sox	3-2	Drabek	Sanders	Hernandez	30,613	48-56
105	July 31	Toronto Blue Jays	4-2	Thompson	Person	Jones	16,294	49-56

August

#	Date	Opponent	Score	Win	Loss	Save	Attendance	Record
106	August 1	Toronto Blue Jays	7-5	Hentgen	Miceli	Ecobar	23,682	49-57
107	August 2	Toronto Blue Jays	8-7	Brocail	Quantrill	Jones	22,254	50-57
108	August 3	Toronto Blue Jays	5-2	Blair	Williams	Jones	27,848	51-57
109	August 4	Cleveland Indians	7-2	Nagy	Sanders		26,832	51-58
110	August 5	Cleveland Indians	6-4	Thompson	Plunk	Jones	24,824	52-58
111	August 6	at Kansas City Royals	5-4	Rosado	Sager	Montgomery	14,640	52-59
112	August 7	at Kansas City Royals	8-4	Dishman	Belcher		21,497	53-59
113	August 8	at Toronto Blue Jays	6-3	Williams	Blair	Escobar	30,228	53-60
114	August 9	at Toronto Blue Jays	3-2	Sanders	Carpenter	Jones	37,166	54-60
115	August 10	at Toronto Blue Jays	4-2	Thompson	Person		32,354	55-60
116	August 11	at Toronto Blue Jays	8-2	Hentgen	Jarvis		30,105	55-61
117	August 12	at Cleveland Indians	7-4	Plunk	Keagle	Mesa	32,992	55-62
118	August 13	at Cleveland Indians	13-3	Blair	Smiley		0	56-62
119	August 13	at Cleveland Indians	9-1	Hershiser	Dishman		42,673	56-63
120	August 14	at Cleveland Indians	12-1	Nagy	Sanders		42,936	56-64
121	August 15	Kansas City Royals	5-3	Rusch	Thompson	Montgomery	20,099	56-65
122	August 16	Kansas City Royals	2-1	Appier	Jarvis	Montgomery	15,502	56-66
123	August 17	Kansas City Royals	8-4	Keagle	Rosado		22,371	57-66
124	August 19	Minnesota Twins	8-2	Blair	Hawkins		15,478	58-66
125	August 20	Minnesota Twins	11-1	Radke	Sanders		13,199	58-67
126	August 21	at Milwaukee Brewers	2-1	Miceli	Wickman	Jones	18,117	59-67
127	August 22	at Milwaukee Brewers	16-1	Moehler	Woodard	Gaillard	14,423	60-67
128	August 23	at Milwaukee Brewers	5-2	Karl	Keagle	Jones	19,524	60-68
129	August 24	at Milwaukee Brewers	6-0	Mercedes	Blair		21,245	60-69
130	August 25	at Minnesota Twins	7-6	Sager	Aguilera		15,245	61-69
131	August 26	at Minnesota Twins	8-2	Robertson	Thompson	Trombley	10,562	61-70
132	August 27	at Minnesota Twins	2-0	Tewksberry	Moehler		10,441	61-71
133	August 29	Philadelphia Phillies	7-2	Blair	Green		22,925	62-71
134	August 30	Philadelphia Phillies	2-0	Beech	Sanders	Bottalico	22,537	62-72
135	August 31	Philadelphia Phillies	2-1	Thompson	Leiter	Jones	19,152	63-72

September

#	Date	Opponent	Score	Win	Loss	Save	Attendance	Record
136	September 1	at Atlanta Braves	4-2	Moehler	Maddux	Jones	38,950	64-72
137	September 2	at Atlanta Braves	5-0	Neagle	Keagle		32,308	64-73
138	September 3	at Atlanta Braves	12-4	Blair	Smoltz		36,556	65-73
139	September 4	Anaheim Angels	5-4	Jones	Harris		9,445	66-73
140	September 5	Anaheim Angels	6-1	Thompson	Springer		16,016	67-73
141	September 6	Anaheim Angels	7-5	Moehler	Watson	Jones	16,294	68-73
142	September 7	Anaheim Angels	5-4	Hasegawa	Dishman		25,602	68-74
143	September 8	Texas Rangers	6-2	Blair	Witt		15,765	69-74
144	September 9	Texas Rangers	4-0	Sanders	Helling		9,139	70-74
145	September 10	at Seattle Mariners	10-0	Moyer	Thompson		22,967	70-75
146	September 11	at Seattle Mariners	3-1	Moehler	Fassero	Jones	25,141	71-75
147	September 12	at Oakland Athletics	7-2	Keagler	Ludwick	Miceli	11,775	72-75
148	September 13	at Oakland Athletics	4-2	Telgheder	Blair	Mathews	20,482	72-76
149	September 14	at Oakland Athletics	6-5	Sanders	Haynes	Jones	16,440	73-76
150	September 15	at Oakland Athletics	6-3	Thompson	Oquist	Jones	4,651	74-76
151	September 17	at New York Yankees	6-2	Mendoza	Moehler		19,331	74-77
152	September 18	at New York Yankees	9-7	Jones	Borowsku	Miceli	18,600	75-77
153	September 19	at Baltimore Orioles	5-3	Jones	Mills		47,544	76-77
154	September 20	at Baltimore Orioles	12-8	Rodriquez	Sanders		47,489	76-78
155	September 21	at Baltimore Orioles	11-3	Thompson	Key		47,446	77-78
156	September 22	at Baltimore Orioles	5-4	Gaillard	Benitez	Jones	46,616	78-78
157	September 23	Boston Red Sox	6-0	Keagle	Suppan		43,039	79-78
158	September 24	Boston Red Sox	9-2	Wakefield	Blair		10,067	79-79
159	September 25	Boston Red Sox	3-1	Checo	Sanders	Gordon	14,495	79-80
160	September 26	New York Yankees	8-2	Rivera	Jones		29,206	79-81
161	September 27	New York Yankees	6-1	Wells	Moehler		33,712	79-82
162	September 28	New York Yankees	7-2	Irabu	Keagle		38,171	79-83

== Player stats ==
= Indicates team leader

=== Batting ===
==== Starters by position ====
Note: Pos = Position; G = Games played; AB = At bats; H = Hits; Avg. = Batting average; HR = Home runs; RBI = Runs batted in

Pos	Player	G	AB	H	Avg.	HR	RBI
C	Raul Casanova	101	304	74	.243	5	24
1B	Tony Clark	159	580	160	.276	32	117
2B	Damion Easley	151	527	139	.264	22	72
3B	Travis Fryman	154	595	163	.274	22	102
SS	Deivi Cruz	147	436	105	.241	2	40
LF	Bobby Higginson	146	546	163	.299	27	101
CF	Brian Hunter	162	658	177	.269	4	45
RF	Melvin Nieves	116	359	82	.228	20	64
DH	Bob Hamelin	110	318	86	.270	18	52

==== Other batters ====
Note: G = Games played; AB = At bats; H = Hits; Avg. = Batting average; HR = Home runs; RBI = Runs batted in

Player	G	AB	H	Avg.	HR	RBI
Phil Nevin	93	251	59	.235	9	35
Curtis Pride	79	162	34	.210	2	19
Brian Johnson	45	139	33	.237	2	18
Matt Walbeck	47	137	38	.277	3	10
Bubba Trammell	44	123	28	.228	4	13
Jody Reed	52	112	22	.196	0	8
Orlando Miller	50	111	26	.234	2	10
Juan Encarnación	11	33	7	.212	1	5
Frank Catalanotto	13	26	8	.308	0	3
Jimmy Hurst	13	17	3	.176	1	1
Vince Coleman	6	14	1	.071	0	0
Marcus Jensen	8	11	2	.182	0	1
Kimera Bartee	12	5	1	.200	0	0
Joe Hall	2	4	2	.500	0	3

=== Pitching ===
==== Starting pitchers ====
Note: G = Games pitched; IP = Innings pitched; W = Wins; L = Losses; ERA = Earned run average; SO = Strikeouts

Player	G	IP	W	L	ERA	SO
Justin Thompson	32	223.1	15	11	3.02	151
Brian Moehler	31	175.1	11	12	4.67	97
Willie Blair	29	175.0	16	8	4.17	90
Omar Olivares	19	115.0	5	6	4.70	74
Felipe Lira	20	92.0	5	7	5.77	64
Scott Sanders	14	74.1	3	8	5.33	58
Greg Keagle	11	45.1	3	5	6.55	33
Tim Pugh	2	9.0	1	1	5.00	4

==== Other pitchers ====
Note: G = Games pitched; IP = Innings pitched; W = Wins; L = Losses; ERA = Earned run average; SO = Strikeouts

Player	G	IP	W	L	ERA	SO
Glenn Dishman	7	29.0	1	2	5.28	20

==== Relief pitchers ====
Note: G = Games pitched; IP = Innings pitched; W = Wins; L = Losses; SV = Saves; ERA = Earned run average; SO = Strikeouts

Player	G	IP	W	L	SV	ERA	SO
Todd Jones	68	70.0	5	4	31	3.09	70
Mike Myers	88	53.2	0	4	2	5.70	50
Dan Miceli	71	82.2	3	2	3	5.01	79
Doug Brocail	61	78.0	3	4	2	3.23	60
A. J. Sager	38	84.0	3	4	3	4.18	53
José Bautista	21	40.1	2	2	0	6.69	19
Kevin Jarvis	17	41.2	0	3	0	5.40	27
John Cummings	19	24.2	2	0	0	5.47	8
Eddie Gaillard	16	20.1	1	0	1	5.31	12
Roberto Duran	13	10.2	0	0	0	7.59	11
Fernando Hernández	2	1.1	0	0	0	40.50	2

== Awards and honors ==
All-Star Game

- Justin Thompson, Pitcher, Reserve (First All-Star appearance)

== Farm system ==
Level	Team	League	Manager
AAA	Toledo Mud Hens	International League	Glenn Ezell and Gene Roof
AA	Jacksonville Suns	Southern League	Dave Anderson
A	Lakeland Tigers	Florida State League	Mark Meleski
A	West Michigan Whitecaps	Midwest League	Bruce Fields
A-Short Season	Jamestown Jammers	New York–Penn League	Dwight Lowry and Matt Martin
Rookie	GCL Tigers	Gulf Coast League	Kevin Bradshaw
