= 1997 Chicago White Sox season =

1997 Chicago White Sox
- League: American League
- Division: Central
- Ballpark: Comiskey Park
- City: Chicago
- Owners: Jerry Reinsdorf
- General managers: Ron Schueler
- Managers: Terry Bevington
- Television: WGN-TV; SportsChannel Chicago (Ken Harrelson, Tom Paciorek)
- Radio: WMVP (John Rooney, Ed Farmer, Dave Wills); WIND (AM) (Hector Molina)

The 1997 Chicago White Sox season was the White Sox's 98th season. They finished with a record of 80–81, good enough for second place in the American League Central, 6 games behind the first place Cleveland Indians.

== Offseason ==
- November 19, 1996: Albert Belle signed as a free agent with the Chicago White Sox.
- January 14, 1997: Doug Drabek was signed as a free agent with the Chicago White Sox.
- February 7, 1997: Danny Darwin signed as a free agent with the Chicago White Sox.

== Regular season ==
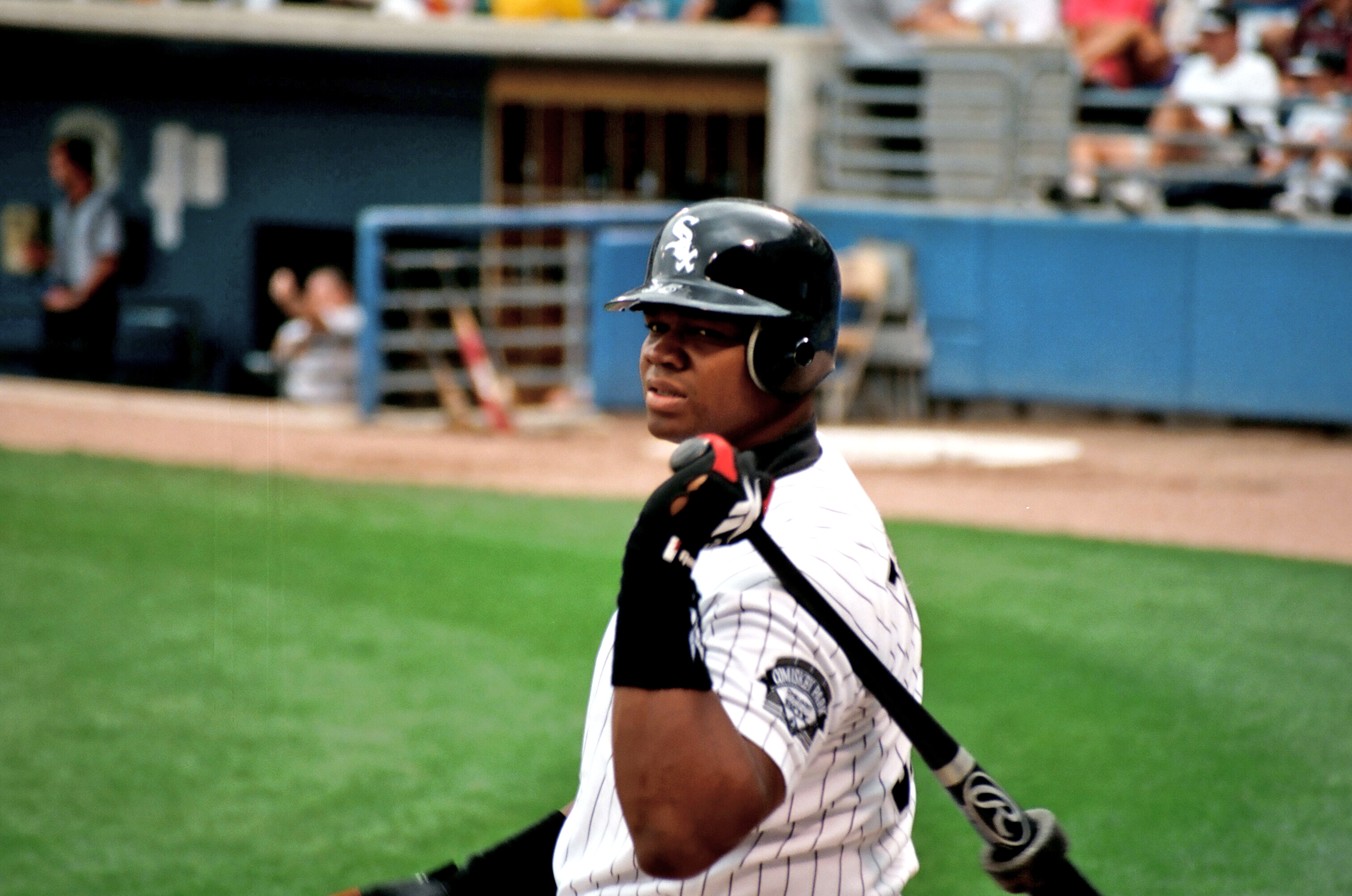
Frank Thomas at Comiskey Park, August 1997

- June 16 – The first interleague game between the Chicago Cubs and Chicago White Sox took place at Comiskey Park II. The Cubs won the game by a score of 8–3.
- September 14 – Chicago White Sox retire catcher Carlton Fisk's No. 72 in a ceremony before the Sept. 14 game against Cleveland Indians.

Carlton Fisk's number 72 was retired by the Chicago White Sox in 1997.

=== Albert Belle ===
In the winter of 1996, Belle signed a 5-year, $55 million deal with the Chicago White Sox as a free agent. This contract made him the highest paid player in baseball for a brief period. Belle enjoyed two great seasons in Chicago, including a career-high 27-game hitting streak in May 1997. Belle came close to having another 50/50 season in 1998, with 49 home runs and 48 doubles. Additionally, when Cal Ripken ended his record consecutive game streak in September 1998, it was Belle who took over as the major leagues' active leader in the category. Belle's White Sox contract had an unusual clause allowing him to demand that he would remain one of the three highest paid players in baseball.

=== Season standings ===
AL Central
Team	W	L	Pct.	GB	Home	Road
Cleveland Indians	86	75	.534	—	44‍–‍37	42‍–‍38
Chicago White Sox	80	81	.497	6	45‍–‍36	35‍–‍45
Milwaukee Brewers	78	83	.484	8	47‍–‍33	31‍–‍50
Minnesota Twins	68	94	.420	18½	35‍–‍46	33‍–‍48
Kansas City Royals	67	94	.416	19	33‍–‍47	34‍–‍47

=== Record vs. opponents ===
1997 American League record Source: MLB Standings Grid – 1997
Team	ANA	BAL	BOS	CWS	CLE	DET	KC	MIL	MIN	NYY	OAK	SEA	TEX	TOR	NL
Anaheim	—	4–7	6–5	6–5	7–4	5–6	6–5	7–4	4–7	4–7	11–1	6–6	8–4	6–5	4–12
Baltimore	7–4	—	5–7	5–6	6–5	6–6	7–4	5–6	10–1	8–4	8–3	7–4	10–1	6–6	8–7
Boston	5–6	7–5	—	3–8	6–5	5–7	3–8	8–3	8–3	4–8	7–4	7–4	3–8	6–6	6–9
Chicago	5–6	6–5	8–3	—	5–7	4–7	11–1	4–7	6–6	2–9	8–3	5–6	3–8	5–6	8–7
Cleveland	4–7	5–6	5–6	7–5	—	6–5	8–3	8–4	8–4	5–6	7–4	3–8	5–6	6–5	9–6
Detroit	6–5	6–6	7–5	7–4	5–6	—	6–5	4–7	4–7	2–10	7–4	4–7	7–4	6–6	8–7
Kansas City	5–6	4–7	8–3	1–11	3–8	5–6	—	6–6	7–5	3–8	3–8	5–6	6–5	5–6	6–9
Milwaukee	4–7	6–5	3–8	7–4	4–8	7–4	6–6	—	5–7	4–7	5–6	5–6	7–4	7–4	8–7
Minnesota	7–4	1–10	3–8	6–6	4–8	7–4	5–7	7–5	—	3–8	7–4	5–6	3–8	3–8	7–8
New York	7–4	4–8	8–4	9–2	6–5	10–2	8–3	7–4	8–3	—	6–5	4–7	7–4	7–5	5–10
Oakland	1–11	3–8	4–7	3–8	4–7	4–7	8–3	6–5	4–7	5–6	—	5–7	5–7	6–5	7–9
Seattle	6–6	4–7	4–7	6–5	8–3	7–4	6–5	6–5	6–5	7–4	7–5	—	8–4	8–3	7–9
Texas	4–8	1–10	8–3	8–3	6–5	4–7	5–6	4–7	8–3	4–7	7–5	4–8	—	4–7	10–6
Toronto	5–6	6–6	6–6	6–5	5–6	6–6	6–5	4–7	8–3	5–7	5–6	3–8	7–4	—	4–11

=== 1997 Opening Day lineup ===
- Tony Phillips, RF
- Dave Martinez, CF
- Frank Thomas, 1B
- Albert Belle, LF
- Harold Baines, DH
- Chris Snopek, 3B
- Ray Durham, 2B
- Ron Karkovice, C
- Ozzie Guillén, SS
- Jaime Navarro, P

=== Notable Transactions ===
May 18, 1997: Tony Phillips was traded by the Chicago White Sox with Chad Kreuter to the Anaheim Angels for Chuck McElroy and Jorge Fábregas.

==== The White Flag Trade ====
The White Flag Trade was a trade made in 1997. On July 31, 1997, the Chicago White Sox traded three major players to the San Francisco Giants for six minor leaguers. At the time, the trade was maligned by the vast majority of White Sox fans as Jerry Reinsdorf giving up on the team, as they were only 3.5 games behind the Cleveland Indians for the American League Central Division lead. In 2000, however, the White Sox won the Central Division title, receiving large contributions from two of the players received in this trade.

- The Chicago White Sox received:
  - Keith Foulke, right-handed pitcher
  - Bob Howry, right-handed pitcher
  - Lorenzo Barceló, right-handed pitcher
  - Ken Vining, left-handed pitcher
  - Mike Caruso, shortstop
  - Brian Manning
- The San Francisco Giants received:
  - Wilson Álvarez, left-handed pitcher
  - Danny Darwin, right-handed pitcher
  - Roberto Hernández, right-handed pitcher

=== Roster ===
1997 Chicago White Sox
Roster
Pitchers: 40 Wilson Álvarez; 37 James Baldwin; 46 Jason Bere; 51 Mike Bertotti; 61,43 Carlos Castillo; 44,49 Tony Castillo; 57 Chris Clemons; 60 Nelson Cruz; 36,44 Danny Darwin; 48 Jeff Darwin; 15 Doug Drabek; 36 Scott Eyre; 32 Tom Fordham; 44 Keith Foulke; 39 Roberto Hernández; 47 Matt Karchner; 54 Al Levine; 26 Chuck McElroy; 38 Jaime Navarro; 41 Bill Simas; 33 Mike Sirotka; 50 Larry Thomas	Catchers: 12 Jorge Fábregas; 20 Ron Karkovice; 12 Chad Kreuter; 55 Robert Machado; 29 Tony Peña; Infielders: 5 Ray Durham; 13 Ozzie Guillén; 7 Norberto Martin; 31 Greg Norton; 27 Chris Snopek; 35 Frank Thomas; 34 Mario Valdez; 23 Robin Ventura	Outfielders: 45 Jeff Abbott; 8 Albert Belle; 24 Mike Cameron; 22 Chad Fonville; 10 Darren Lewis; 14 Dave Martinez; 28 Lyle Mouton; 30 Magglio Ordóñez; 73 Tony Phillips; Other batters: 3 Harold Baines	Manager: 18 Terry Bevington; Coaches: 22 Bill Buckner (hitting); 52 Ron Jackson (first base); 53 Art Kusnyer (bullpen); 21 Joe Nossek (bench); 25 Mike Pazik (pitching); 17 Doug Rader (third base); 58 Mark Salas (bullpen catcher)

== Player stats ==
=== Batting ===
Note: G = Games played; AB = At bats; R = Runs scored; H = Hits; 2B = Doubles; 3B = Triples; HR = Home runs; RBI = Runs batted in; BB = Base on balls; SO = Strikeouts; AVG = Batting average; SB = Stolen bases

Player	G	AB	R	H	2B	3B	HR	RBI	BB	SO	AVG	SB
Jeff Abbott, OF, DH	19	38	8	10	1	0	1	2	0	6	.263	0
Wilson Álvarez, P	22	3	0	0	0	0	0	0	0	2	.000	0
Harold Baines, DH	93	318	40	97	18	0	12	52	41	47	.305	0
James Baldwin, P	32	3	0	0	0	0	0	0	0	2	.000	0
Albert Belle, LF	161	634	90	174	45	1	30	116	53	105	.274	4
Mike Cameron, CF	116	379	63	98	18	3	14	55	55	105	.259	23
Carlos Castillo, P	37	1	0	1	0	0	0	0	0	0	1.000	0
Tony Castillo, P	64	1	0	0	0	0	0	0	0	0	.000	0
Danny Darwin, P	21	3	0	0	0	0	0	0	0	3	.000	0
Doug Drabek, P	32	1	1	0	0	0	0	0	0	1	.000	0
Ray Durham, 2B	155	634	106	172	27	5	11	53	61	96	.271	33
Scott Eyre, P	11	2	0	1	0	0	0	0	0	0	.500	0
Jorge Fábregas, C	100	322	31	90	10	1	7	48	11	43	.280	1
Chad Fonville, OF, SS, 2B	9	9	1	1	0	0	0	1	1	1	.111	2
Ozzie Guillén, SS	142	490	59	120	21	6	4	52	22	24	.245	5
Ron Karkovice, C	51	138	10	25	3	0	6	18	11	32	.181	0
Chad Kreuter, C	19	37	6	8	2	1	1	3	8	9	.216	0
Darren Lewis, CF	81	77	15	18	1	0	0	5	11	14	.234	11
Robert Machado, C	10	15	1	3	0	1	0	2	1	6	.200	0
Norberto Martin, SS, 3B, 2B	71	213	24	64	7	1	2	27	6	31	.300	1
Dave Martinez, OF, 1B	145	504	78	144	16	6	12	55	55	69	.286	12
Chuck McElroy, P	49	0	1	0	0	0	0	0	0	0	.000	0
Lyle Mouton, OF, DH	88	242	26	65	9	0	5	23	14	66	.269	4
Jaime Navarro, P	33	1	0	0	0	0	0	0	0	0	.000	0
Greg Norton, 3B	18	34	5	9	2	2	0	1	2	8	.265	0
Magglio Ordóñez, RF	21	69	12	22	6	0	4	11	2	8	.319	1
Tony Peña, C	31	67	4	11	1	0	0	8	8	13	.164	0
Tony Phillips, RF, 3B	36	129	23	40	6	0	2	9	29	29	.310	4
Mike Sirotka, P	7	1	0	0	0	0	0	0	0	1	.000	0
Chris Snopek, 3B, SS	86	298	27	65	15	0	5	35	18	51	.218	3
Frank Thomas, 1B, DH	146	530	110	184	35	0	35	125	109	69	.347	1
Mario Valdez, 1B	54	115	11	28	7	0	1	13	17	39	.243	1
Robin Ventura, 3B	54	183	27	48	10	1	6	26	34	21	.262	0
Team totals	161	5491	779	1498	260	28	158	740	569	901	.273	106

=== Pitching ===
Note: W = Wins; L = Losses; ERA = Earned run average; G = Games pitched; GS = Games started; SV = Saves; IP = Innings pitched; H = Hits allowed; R = Runs allowed; ER = Earned runs allowed; HR = Home runs allowed; BB = Walks allowed; K = Strikeouts

Player	W	L	ERA	G	GS	SV	IP	H	R	ER	HR	BB	K
Wilson Álvarez	9	8	3.03	22	22	0	145.2	126	61	49	9	56	110
James Baldwin	12	15	5.27	32	32	0	200.0	205	128	117	19	86	140
Jason Bere	4	2	4.71	6	6	0	28.2	20	15	15	4	17	21
Mike Bertotti	0	0	7.36	9	0	0	3.2	9	3	3	0	2	4
Carlos Castillo	2	1	4.48	37	2	1	66.1	68	35	33	9	36	43
Tony Castillo	4	4	4.91	64	0	4	62.1	74	48	34	6	30	42
Chris Clemons	0	2	8.53	5	2	0	12.2	19	13	12	4	11	8
Nelson Cruz	0	2	6.49	19	0	0	26.1	29	19	19	6	10	31
Danny Darwin	4	8	4.13	21	17	0	113.1	130	60	52	21	32	62
Jeff Darwin	0	1	5.27	14	0	0	13.2	17	8	8	1	7	9
Doug Drabek	12	11	5.74	31	31	0	169.1	170	109	108	30	74	85
Scott Eyre	4	4	5.04	11	11	0	60.2	62	36	34	11	32	36
Tom Fordham	0	1	6.23	7	1	0	17.1	17	13	12	2	12	10
Keith Foulke	3	0	3.45	16	0	3	28.2	28	11	11	4	6	21
Roberto Hernández	5	1	2.44	46	0	27	48.0	38	15	13	5	28	47
Matt Karchner	3	1	2.91	52	0	15	52.2	50	18	17	4	30	30
Al Levine	2	2	6.91	25	0	0	27.1	35	22	21	4	17	22
Chuck McElroy	1	3	3.94	48	0	1	59.1	56	29	26	3	20	44
Jaime Navarro	9	14	5.79	33	33	0	209.2	267	155	135	22	79	142
Bill Simas	3	1	4.14	40	0	1	41.1	46	23	19	6	27	38
Mike Sirotka	3	0	2.25	7	4	0	32.0	36	9	8	4	6	24
Larry Thomas	0	0	8.10	5	0	0	3.1	3	3	3	1	2	0
Team totals	80	81	4.73	161	161	52	1422.1	1505	833	748	175	620	961

== Farm system ==
Level	Team	League	Manager
AAA	Nashville Sounds	American Association	Tom Spencer
AA	Birmingham Barons	Southern League	Dave Huppert
A	Winston-Salem Warthogs	Carolina League	Mike Heath and Mark Haley
A	Hickory Crawdads	South Atlantic League	Chris Cron
Rookie	Bristol White Sox	Appalachian League	Nick Capra
Rookie	GCL White Sox	Gulf Coast League	Roly de Armas
