= 1997 Oakland Athletics season =

1997 Oakland Athletics
- League: American League
- Division: West
- Ballpark: Oakland–Alameda County Coliseum
- City: Oakland, California
- Record: 65–97 (.401)
- Divisional place: 4th
- Owners: Stephen Schott; Kenneth Hofmann
- General managers: Sandy Alderson
- Managers: Art Howe
- Television: KRON-TV; Sports Channel Pacific (Ray Fosse, Greg Papa, Ken Wilson)
- Radio: KFRC (Bill King, Ken Korach, Ray Fosse)

The Oakland Athletics' 1997 season was the 97th season in franchise history. The team finished fourth in the American League West with a record of 65–97.

Coming off a 78–84 campaign in 1996, The Athletics hoped to reach the playoffs for the first time since 1992. With this as the goal, the team traded for Jose Canseco who had previously played for the Athletics from 1985 to 1992, as a hope to get another power hitter. With the trade, Canseco was reunited with fellow superstar (and fellow "Bash Brother") Mark McGwire. In addition to McGwire and Canseco, Oakland's lineup included other power hitters such as Jason Giambi, Gerónimo Berroa, and Matt Stairs.

Although a good looking off-season, little was done to improve the Athletics' poor 1996 pitching staff. Ariel Prieto, who had a 4.41 career ERA, was named the Opening Day starter; a succession of poorly regarded players filled out the rest of the starting rotation and bullpen. While optimism remained high for the team's offense, great concern remained for its pitching staff.

In the end, Oakland's offense and pitching both fared poorly. No starter won more than six games. None of the team's top four starters (Ariel Prieto, Steve Karsay, Mike Oquist, and Dave Telgheder) finished the season with an ERA of less than 5.00; the Athletics, as a team, finished with an earned run average of 5.48, a league worst. All told, Oakland allowed a season total of 946 runs. A record that still holds till today

More puzzling was the fate of the offense. Oakland, as expected, remained one of the league's best power-hitting teams. The Athletics' sluggers hit a total of 197 home runs (third-most in the American League). Oakland's home runs failed to generate much offense, however, as all around low batting average for the team negated most of the team's other advantages. Oakland scored a total of 764 runs in 1997 (the 11th highest total in the American League).

These awful performances quickly removed the A's from contention. On May 31, they were already nine games out of first place; their position steadily worsened throughout the summer. In light of this, General Manager Sandy Alderson traded Mark McGwire (who, at the time, was on pace to break Roger Maris' single-season home run record) to the St. Louis Cardinals for T.J. Matthews, Blake Stein, and Eric Ludwick. McGwire would finish the season with 58 home runs (four shy of breaking the record). The trade was a disaster on the Athletics' end, as none of the three players received in the trade panned out. The A's ultimately finished twenty-five games behind the first-place Seattle Mariners. Their 65-97 finish (the club's worst since 1979) led to the removal of Sandy Alderson as General Manager on October 17, he was replaced by Billy Beane. Manager Art Howe, however, was retained for the 1998 season.

The 1997 season would ultimately prove to be the Athletics' nadir. The continued rise of Jason Giambi, the debuts of Ben Grieve and Miguel Tejada, the acquisition of Tim Hudson in the 1997 MLB draft, and the ascension of Billy Beane to the position of general manager paved the way for a lengthy period of success from 1999 onwards.

== Offseason ==
- October 2, 1996: Dane Johnson was selected off waivers by the Oakland Athletics from the Toronto Blue Jays.
- November 19, 1996: Mike Oquist was signed as a free agent with the Oakland Athletics.
- December 9, 1996: Frank Catalanotto was drafted by the Oakland Athletics from the Detroit Tigers in the 1996 rule 5 draft.
- January 27, 1997: John Wasdin was traded by the Oakland Athletics to the Boston Red Sox for Jose Canseco.
- March 21, 1997: Frank Catalanotto was returned (earlier draft pick) by the Oakland Athletics to the Detroit Tigers.
- March 27, 1997: Scott Service was selected off waivers by the Oakland Athletics from the Cincinnati Reds.

== Regular season ==
- Ben Grieve had five RBI's in his major league debut.

=== Transactions ===
- April 4, 1997: Scott Service was selected off waivers by the Cincinnati Reds from the Oakland Athletics.
- April 8, 1997: Brent Mayne was signed as a free agent with the Oakland Athletics.
- June 3, 1997: Tim Hudson was drafted by the Oakland Athletics in the 6th round of the 1997 amateur draft. Player signed June 13, 1997.
- July 31, 1997 – Mark McGwire was traded by Oakland Athletics to the St. Louis Cardinals for Eric Ludwick, T. J. Mathews, and Blake Stein. McGwire had 34 home runs and 81 RBIs with Oakland at the time of the trade, which reunited him with former Athletics manager Tony La Russa.
- August 8, 1997: Tilson Brito was selected off waivers by the Oakland Athletics from the Toronto Blue Jays.

=== Season standings ===
AL West
Team	W	L	Pct.	GB	Home	Road
Seattle Mariners	90	72	.556	—	45‍–‍36	45‍–‍36
Anaheim Angels	84	78	.519	6	46‍–‍36	38‍–‍42
Texas Rangers	77	85	.475	13	39‍–‍42	38‍–‍43
Oakland Athletics	65	97	.401	25	35‍–‍46	30‍–‍51

=== Record vs. opponents ===
1997 American League record Source: MLB Standings Grid – 1997
Team	ANA	BAL	BOS	CWS	CLE	DET	KC	MIL	MIN	NYY	OAK	SEA	TEX	TOR	NL
Anaheim	—	4–7	6–5	6–5	7–4	5–6	6–5	7–4	4–7	4–7	11–1	6–6	8–4	6–5	4–12
Baltimore	7–4	—	5–7	5–6	6–5	6–6	7–4	5–6	10–1	8–4	8–3	7–4	10–1	6–6	8–7
Boston	5–6	7–5	—	3–8	6–5	5–7	3–8	8–3	8–3	4–8	7–4	7–4	3–8	6–6	6–9
Chicago	5–6	6–5	8–3	—	5–7	4–7	11–1	4–7	6–6	2–9	8–3	5–6	3–8	5–6	8–7
Cleveland	4–7	5–6	5–6	7–5	—	6–5	8–3	8–4	8–4	5–6	7–4	3–8	5–6	6–5	9–6
Detroit	6–5	6–6	7–5	7–4	5–6	—	6–5	4–7	4–7	2–10	7–4	4–7	7–4	6–6	8–7
Kansas City	5–6	4–7	8–3	1–11	3–8	5–6	—	6–6	7–5	3–8	3–8	5–6	6–5	5–6	6–9
Milwaukee	4–7	6–5	3–8	7–4	4–8	7–4	6–6	—	5–7	4–7	5–6	5–6	7–4	7–4	8–7
Minnesota	7–4	1–10	3–8	6–6	4–8	7–4	5–7	7–5	—	3–8	7–4	5–6	3–8	3–8	7–8
New York	7–4	4–8	8–4	9–2	6–5	10–2	8–3	7–4	8–3	—	6–5	4–7	7–4	7–5	5–10
Oakland	1–11	3–8	4–7	3–8	4–7	4–7	8–3	6–5	4–7	5–6	—	5–7	5–7	6–5	7–9
Seattle	6–6	4–7	4–7	6–5	8–3	7–4	6–5	6–5	6–5	7–4	7–5	—	8–4	8–3	7–9
Texas	4–8	1–10	8–3	8–3	6–5	4–7	5–6	4–7	8–3	4–7	7–5	4–8	—	4–7	10–6
Toronto	5–6	6–6	6–6	6–5	5–6	6–6	6–5	4–7	8–3	5–7	5–6	3–8	7–4	—	4–11

=== Roster ===
1997 Oakland Athletics
Roster
Pitchers: 55 Mark Acre; 40 Willie Adams; 47 Billy Brewer; 24,42 Buddy Groom; 49 Gary Haught; 51 Jimmy Haynes; 59 Dane Johnson; 53 John Johnstone; 20 Steve Karsay; 58 Tim Kubinski; 44,51 Richie Lewis; 49 Andrew Lorraine; 41 Eric Ludwick; 29 T.J. Mathews; 32 Mike Mohler; 54 Steve Montgomery; 45 Mike Oquist; 48 Ariel Prieto; 37 Carlos Reyes; 57 Brad Rigby; 30 Aaron Small; 22 Billy Taylor; 50 Dave Telgheder; 56 Don Wengert; 52 Jay Witasick; 39 Steve Wojciechowski	Catchers: 6 Brent Mayne; 21 Izzy Molina; 19 George Williams; Infielders: 28 Tony Batista; 47 Mark Bellhorn; 26 Rafael Bournigal; 8 Tilson Brito; 7 Scott Brosius; 17 Dave Magadan; 25 Mark McGwire; 8 Scott Sheldon; 21 Scott Spiezio; 4 Miguel Tejada	Outfielders: 29 Gerónimo Berroa; 33 Jose Canseco; 16 Jason Giambi; 14 Ben Grieve; 23 Patrick Lennon; 5 Brian Lesher; 33 Damon Mashore; 2 Jason McDonald; 12 Matt Stairs; 11 Ernie Young	Manager: 18 Art Howe; Coaches: 3 Bob Cluck; 9 Duffy Dyer; 35 Brad Fischer; 15 Denny Walling; 38 Ron Washington

== Player stats ==
= Indicates team leader

=== Batting ===
==== Starters by position ====
Note: Pos = Position; G = Games played; AB = At bats; R = Runs scored; H = Hits; Avg. = Batting average; HR = Home runs; RBI = Runs batted in; SB = Stolen Bases

Pos	Player	G	AB	R	H	Avg.	HR	RBI	SB
C	Brent Mayne	85	256	29	74	.289	6	22	1
1B	Mark McGwire	105	366	48	104	.284	34	81	1
2B	Scott Spiezio	147	538	58	131	.243	14	65	9
3B	Scott Brosius	129	479	59	97	.203	11	41	9
SS	Rafael Bournigal	79	222	29	62	.279	1	20	2
LF	Jason Giambi	142	519	66	152	.293	20	81	0
CF	Damon Mashore	92	279	55	69	.247	3	18	5
RF	Matt Stairs	133	352	62	105	.298	27	73	3
DH	José Canseco	108	388	56	91	.235	23	74	8

==== Other batters ====
Note: G = Games played; AB = At bats; R = Runs scored; H = Hits; Avg. = Batting average; HR = Home runs; RBI = Runs batted in; SB = Stolen Bases

Player	G	AB	R	H	Avg.	HR	RBI	SB
Dave Magadan	128	271	38	82	.303	4	30	1
Gerónimo Berroa	73	261	40	81	.310	16	42	3
Jason McDonald	78	236	47	62	.263	4	14	13
Mark Bellhorn	68	224	33	51	.228	6	19	7
George Williams	76	201	30	58	.289	3	22	0
Tony Batista	68	188	22	38	.202	4	18	2
Ernie Young	71	175	22	39	.223	5	15	1
Brian Lesher	46	131	17	30	.229	4	16	4
Patrick Lennon	56	116	14	34	.293	1	14	0
Izzy Molina	48	111	6	22	.198	3	7	0
Miguel Tejada	26	99	10	20	.202	2	10	2
Ben Grieve	24	93	12	29	.312	3	24	0
Tilson Brito	17	46	8	13	.283	2	6	0
Scott Sheldon	13	24	2	6	.250	1	2	0

=== Pitching ===
==== Starting pitchers ====
Note: G = Games pitched; IP = Innings pitched; W = Wins; L = Losses; ERA = Earned run average; BB = Walks allowed; SO = Strikeouts

Player	G	IP	W	L	ERA	BB	SO
Steve Karsay	24	132.2	3	12	5.77	47	92
Ariel Prieto	27	125.0	6	8	5.04	70	90
Mike Oquist	19	107.2	4	6	5.02	43	72
Dave Telgheder	20	101.0	4	6	6.06	35	55
Brad Rigby	14	77.2	1	7	4.87	22	34
Jimmy Haynes	13	73.1	3	6	4.42	40	65
Willie Adams	13	58.1	3	5	8.18	32	37
Eric Ludwick	6	24.0	1	4	8.25	16	14
Steve Wojciechowski	2	10.1	0	2	7.84	1	5

==== Other pitchers ====
Note: G = Games pitched; IP = Innings pitched; W = Wins; L = Losses; ERA = Earned run average; SO = Strikeouts

Player	G	IP	W	L	ERA	SO
Don Wengert	49	134.0	5	11	6.04	68
Mike Mohler	62	101.2	1	10	5.13	66
Carlos Reyes	37	77.1	3	4	5.82	43
Andrew Lorraine	12	29.2	3	1	6.37	18

==== Relief pitchers ====
Note: G = Games pitched; IP = Innings pitched; W = Wins; L = Losses; SV = Saves; ERA = Earned run average; SO = Strikeouts

Player	G	IP	W	L	SV	ERA	SO
Billy Taylor	72	73.0	3	4	23	3.82	66
Buddy Groom	78	64.2	2	2	3	5.15	45
Aaron Small	71	96.2	9	5	4	4.28	57
Dane Johnson	38	45.2	4	1	2	4.53	43
T.J. Mathews	24	28.2	6	2	3	4.40	24
Mark Acre	15	15.2	2	0	0	5.74	12
Richie Lewis	14	18.2	2	0	0	9.64	12
Tim Kubinski	11	12.2	0	0	0	5.68	10
Jay Witasick	8	11.0	0	0	0	5.73	8
Gary Haught	6	11.1	0	0	0	7.15	11
John Johnstone	5	6.1	0	0	0	2.84	4
Steve Montgomery	4	6.1	0	1	0	9.95	1
Billy Brewer	3	2.0	0	0	0	13.50	1

== Awards and records ==
- Mark McGwire, Major League record, 1st player to lead the Major Leagues in Home Runs but not lead the American League or National League in home runs

All-Star Game

- Mark McGwire, First Base, Reserve

== Farm system ==
Level	Team	League	Manager
AAA	Edmonton Trappers	Pacific Coast League	Gary Jones
AA	Huntsville Stars	Southern League	Mike Quade
A	Modesto A's	California League	Jeffrey Leonard
A	Visalia Oaks	California League	Tony DeFrancesco
A-Short Season	Southern Oregon Timberjacks	Northwest League	John Kuehl
Rookie	AZL Athletics	Arizona League	Juan Navarrette

LEAGUE CHAMPIONS: Edmonton
