= Jed Hansen =

American baseball player (born 1972)

- Second baseman
- Born: August 19, 1972 (age 53); Tacoma, Washington, U.S.
- Batted: Right Threw: Right

MLB debut
- July 29, 1997, for the Kansas City Royals

Last MLB appearance
- September 22, 1999, for the Kansas City Royals

MLB statistics
- Batting average: .256
- Home runs: 4
- Runs batted in: 19
- Stats at Baseball Reference

Teams
- Kansas City Royals (1997–1999)

Jed Ramon Hansen (born August 19, 1972) is a former Major League Baseball second baseman who played for three seasons. He played for the Kansas City Royals from 1997 to 1999, playing in 87 career games.
