= José Mercedes =

Dominican baseball player (born 1971)

- Pitcher
- Born: March 5, 1971 (age 55); El Seibo, Dominican Republic
- Batted: Right Threw: Right

MLB debut
- May 31, 1994, for the Milwaukee Brewers

Last MLB appearance
- September 24, 2003, for the Montreal Expos

MLB statistics
- Win–loss record: 33–39
- Earned run average: 4.75
- Strikeouts: 310
- Stats at Baseball Reference

Teams
- Milwaukee Brewers (1994–1998); Baltimore Orioles (2000–2001); Montreal Expos (2003)

José Miguel Mercedes Santana (born March 5, 1971) is a Dominican former professional baseball pitcher. He played in Major League Baseball from 1994 to 2003 for the Milwaukee Brewers, Baltimore Orioles, and Montreal Expos. Mercedes played for the Saraperos de Saltillo of the Mexican League in 2010.
