= Mike Bovee =

American baseball player (born 1973)

- Pitcher
- Born: August 21, 1973 (age 52); San Diego, California, U.S.
- Batted: Right Threw: Right

MLB debut
- September 13, 1997, for the Anaheim Angels

Last MLB appearance
- September 28, 1997, for the Anaheim Angels

MLB statistics
- Win–loss record: 0–0
- Earned run average: 5.40
- Strikeouts: 5
- Stats at Baseball Reference

Teams
- Anaheim Angels (1997)

Michael Craig Bovee (born August 21, 1973) is an American former professional baseball player who played one season for the Anaheim Angels of Major League Baseball.

== Sources ==
- Career statistics from Baseball Reference · Fangraphs · Baseball Reference (Minors) · Retrosheet · Baseball Almanac, or Retrosheet
