= 1995 Boston Red Sox season =

Major League Baseball season

1995 Boston Red Sox
- American League East champions
- League: American League
- Division: East
- Ballpark: Fenway Park
- City: Boston, Massachusetts
- Record: 86–58 (.597)
- Divisional place: 1st
- Owners: JRY Trust
- President: John Harrington
- General manager: Dan Duquette
- Manager: Kevin Kennedy
- Television: WSBK-TV, Ch. 38 (Sean McDonough, Bob Montgomery); NESN (Bob Kurtz, Jerry Remy)
- Radio: WEEI (Jerry Trupiano, Joe Castiglione); WROL (Bobby Serrano, Hector Martinez)
- Stats: ESPN.com; Baseball Reference

The 1995 Boston Red Sox season was the 95th season in the franchise's Major League Baseball history. The Red Sox finished first in the American League East with a record of 86–58, as teams played 144 games (instead of the normal 162) due to the 1994–95 Major League Baseball strike. The Red Sox were swept in 3 games to the American League Central champion Cleveland Indians in the ALDS.

== Offseason ==
- November 7, 1994: Bill Haselman was signed as a free agent by the Red Sox.
- November 7, 1994: Juan Bell was signed as a free agent by the Red Sox.
- December 5, 1994: Selected Vaughn Eshelman from the Baltimore Orioles in the Rule 5 draft.
- December 7, 1994: Jeff McNeely and Nate Minchey were traded to the St. Louis Cardinals for Luis Alicea.
- December 9, 1994: Otis Nixon and Luis Ortiz were traded by the Red Sox to the Texas Rangers for José Canseco.

== Regular season ==
In May, the team's grounds crew changed the signage noting the distance along the left-field foul line from home plate to the Green Monster—updated to read 310 feet (94 m), it had been signed for many years as being 315 feet (96 m). This occurred shortly after reporter Dan Shaughnessy of The Boston Globe physically measured the distance as 309 feet 3 inches (94.26 m).

Record by month
Month	Record		Cumulative		AL East		Ref.
Month	Won	Lost	Won	Lost	Position	GB	Ref.
April	3	1	3	1	1st (tie)	—	
May	17	10	20	11	1st	+6	
June	14	14	34	25	1st	+5	
July	14	13	48	38	1st	+4 1/2	
August	23	7	71	45	1st	+14	
September	15	12	86	57	1st	+8	
October	0	1	86	58	1st	+7	

The Red Sox collected an MLB-high of 286 doubles in 1995, for an average of nearly two per game.

=== Season standings ===
AL East
Team	W	L	Pct.	GB	Home	Road
Boston Red Sox	86	58	.597	—	42‍–‍30	44‍–‍28
New York Yankees	79	65	.549	7	46‍–‍26	33‍–‍39
Baltimore Orioles	71	73	.493	15	36‍–‍36	35‍–‍37
Detroit Tigers	60	84	.417	26	35‍–‍37	25‍–‍47
Toronto Blue Jays	56	88	.389	30	29‍–‍43	27‍–‍45

=== Record vs. opponents ===
1995 American League record Source: MLB Standings Grid – 1995
Team	BAL	BOS	CAL	CWS	CLE	DET	KC	MIL	MIN	NYY	OAK	SEA	TEX	TOR
Baltimore	—	4–9	9–4	6–1	2–10	8–5	4–5	7–5	3–6	6–7	5–7	6–7	4–1	7–6
Boston	9–4	—	11–3	5–3	6–7	8–5	3–2	8–4	5–4	5–8	8–4	7–5	3–4	8–5
California	4–9	3–11	—	10–2	3–2	6–2	5–7	5–2	8–5	7–5	6–7	7–6	6–7	8–2
Chicago	1–6	3–5	2–10	—	5–8	8–4	8–5	6–7	10–3	3–2–1	7–5	4–9	5–7	6–5
Cleveland	10–2	7–6	2–3	8–5	—	10–3	11–1	9–4	9–4	6–6	7–0	5–4	6–3	10–3
Detroit	5–8	5–8	2–6	4–8	3–10	—	3–4	8–5	7–5	5–8	2–3	5–5	4–8	7–6
Kansas City	5–4	2–3	7–5	5–8	1–11	4–3	—	10–2	6–7	3–7	5–8	7–5	8–6	7–5
Milwaukee	5–7	4–8	2–5	7–6	4–9	5–8	2–10	—	9–4	5–6	7–2	3–2	5–7	7–5
Minnesota	6–3	4–5	5–8	3–10	4–9	5–7	7–6	4–9	—	3–4	5–7	4–8	5–8	1–4
New York	7–6	8–5	5–7	2–3–1	6–6	8–5	7–3	6–5	4–3	—	4–9	4–9	6–3	12–1
Oakland	7–5	4–8	7–6	5–7	0–7	3–2	8–5	2–7	7–5	9–4	—	7–6	5–8	3–7
Seattle	7–6	5–7	6–7	9–4	4–5	5–5	5–7	2–3	8–4	9–4	6–7	—	10–3	3–4
Texas	1–4	4–3	7–6	7–5	3–6	8–4	6–8	7–5	8–5	3–6	8–5	3–10	—	9–3
Toronto	6–7	5–8	2–8	5–6	3–10	6–7	5–7	5–7	4–1	1–12	7–3	4–3	3–9	—

=== Notable transactions ===
- April 8, 1995: Mike MacFarlane was signed as a free agent by the Red Sox.
- April 9, 1995: Stan Belinda was signed as a free agent by the Red Sox.
- April 9, 1995: Cory Bailey and Scott Cooper were traded by the Red Sox to the St. Louis Cardinals for Mark Whiten and Rhéal Cormier.
- April 9, 1995: Reggie Jefferson was signed as a free agent by the Red Sox.
- April 11, 1995: Erik Hanson was signed as a free agent by the Red Sox.
- April 14, 1995: Troy O'Leary was selected off waivers from the Milwaukee Brewers.
- April 18, 1995: Zane Smith was signed as a free agent by the Red Sox.
- April 22, 1995: Derek Lilliquist was signed as a free agent by the Red Sox.
- April 26, 1995: Tim Wakefield was signed as a free agent by the Red Sox.
- May 26, 1995: Tuffy Rhodes was selected off waivers by the Red Sox from the Chicago Cubs.
- May 30, 1995: Mike Maddux was signed as a free agent by the Red Sox.
- June 1, 1995: Pat Burrell was drafted by the Red Sox in the 43rd round of the 1995 Major League Baseball draft, but did not sign.
- June 6, 1995: Willie McGee was signed as a free agent by the Red Sox.
- July 6, 1996: Frankie Rodriguez and a player to be named later were traded to the Minnesota Twins for Rick Aguilera. J. J. Johnson was sent to the Twins on October 11 to complete the trade.
- July 24, 1995: Mark Whiten was traded by the Red Sox to the Philadelphia Phillies for Dave Hollins.
- July 26, 1995: Wally Whitehurst was released by the Red Sox.
- July 31, 1995: The Red Sox traded players to be named later to the Atlanta Braves for Mike Stanton and a player to be named later. The trade was completed on August 31, when the Braves sent Matt Murray to the Red Sox, and the Red Sox sent Mike Jacobs (minors) and Marc Lewis (minors) to the Braves.
- August 10, 1995: Eric Gunderson was selected off waivers from the Seattle Mariners.
- August 14, 1995: Wes Chamberlain was traded to the Kansas City Royals for Chris James.
- August 31, 1995: Dwayne Hosey was selected off waivers from the Kansas City Royals.

=== Opening Day lineup ===
10	Luis Alicea	2B
13	John Valentin	SS
33	José Canseco	DH
42	Mo Vaughn	1B
27	Mark Whiten	RF
39	Mike Greenwell	LF
15	Mike MacFarlane	C
11	Tim Naehring	3B
38	Lee Tinsley	CF
36	Aaron Sele	P

=== Roster ===
1995 Boston Red Sox
Roster
Pitchers: 38 Rick Aguilera; 57 Brian Bark; 43 Stan Belinda; 21 Roger Clemens; 34 Rhéal Cormier; 52 Vaughn Eshelman; 28 Eric Gunderson; 40 Erik Hanson; 49 Mike Hartley; 54 Joe Hudson; 45 Joel Johnston; 28 Derek Lilliquist; 51 Brian Looney; 19 Mike Maddux; 45 Matt Murray; 26 Alejandro Peña; 56 Jeff Pierce; 30 Frankie Rodriguez; 50 Ken Ryan; 36 Aaron Sele; 54 Keith Shepherd; 48 Zane Smith; 32 Mike Stanton; 55 Jeff Suppan; 53 Tim Van Egmond; 49 Tim Wakefield	Catchers: 37 Bill Haselman; 30 Scott Hatteberg; 15 Mike Macfarlane; 12 Rich Rowland; Infielders: 10 Luis Alicea; 29 Juan Bell; 6 Chris Donnels; 11 Tim Naehring; 3 Carlos Rodríguez; 7 Steve Rodriguez; 2 Terry Shumpert; 13 John Valentin; 42 Mo Vaughn	Outfielders: 26 Wes Chamberlain; 39 Mike Greenwell; 46 Dwayne Hosey; 22 Chris James; 46 Ron Mahay; 51 Willie McGee; 25 Troy O'Leary; 29 Karl Rhodes; 35 Matt Stairs; 26,38 Lee Tinsley; 27 Mark Whiten; Designated hitters: 33 José Canseco; 27 Dave Hollins; 18 Reggie Jefferson	Manager: 44 Kevin Kennedy; Coaches: 41 John Cumberland (Pitching); 17 Tim Johnson (Bench); 47 Al Nipper (Pitching); 16 Dave Oliver (Third base); 14 Jim Rice (Hitting); 23 Herm Starrette (Bullpen); 20 Frank White (First base)

== Player stats ==
= Indicates team leader

= Indicates league leader

=== Batting ===
==== Starters by position ====
Note: G = Games played; AB = At bats; H = Hits; Avg. = Batting average; HR = Home runs; RBI = Runs batted in; SB = Stolen bases

Pos	Player	G	AB	H	Avg.	HR	RBI	SB
C	Mike Macfarlane	115	364	82	.225	15	51	2
1B	Mo Vaughn	140	550	165	.300	39	126	11
2B	Luis Alicea	132	419	113	.270	6	44	13
SS	John Valentin	135	520	155	.298	27	102	20
3B	Tim Naehring	126	433	133	.307	10	57	0
LF	Mike Greenwell	120	481	143	.297	15	76	9
CF	Lee Tinsley	100	341	97	.284	7	41	18
RF	Troy O'Leary	112	399	123	.308	10	49	5
DH	Jose Canseco	102	396	121	.306	24	81	4

==== Other batters ====
Note: G = Games played; AB = At bats; H = Hits; Avg. = Batting average; HR = Home runs; RBI = Runs batted in; SB = Stolen bases

Player	G	AB	H	Avg.	HR	RBI	SB
Willie McGee	67	200	57	.285	2	15	5
Bill Haselman	64	152	37	.243	5	23	0
Reggie Jefferson	46	121	35	.289	5	26	0
Mark Whiten	32	108	20	.185	1	10	1
Chris Donnels	40	91	23	.253	2	11	0
Matt Stairs	39	88	23	.261	1	17	0
Dwayne Hosey	24	68	23	.338	3	7	6
Terry Shumpert	21	47	11	.234	0	3	3
Wes Chamberlain	19	42	5	.119	1	1	1
Carlos Rodríguez	13	30	10	.333	0	5	0
Rich Rowland	14	29	5	.172	0	1	0
Juan Bell	17	26	4	.154	1	2	0
Tuffy Rhodes	10	25	2	.080	0	1	0
Chris James	16	24	4	.167	0	1	0
Ron Mahay	5	20	4	.200	1	3	0
Dave Hollins	5	13	2	.154	0	1	0
Steve Rodriguez	6	8	1	.125	0	0	1
Scott Hatteberg	2	2	1	.500	0	0	0

=== Pitching ===
==== All starting and relief pitchers ====
Note: G = Games pitched; GS = Games started; IP = Innings pitched; W = Wins; L = Losses; SV = Saves; ERA = Earned run average; SO = Strikeouts

Player	G	GS	IP	W	L	SV	ERA	SO
Tim Wakefield	27	27	195.1	16	8	0	2.95	119
Erik Hanson	29	29	186.2	15	5	0	4.24	139
Roger Clemens	23	23	140.0	10	5	0	4.18	132
Rhéal Cormier	48	12	115.0	7	5	0	4.07	69
Zane Smith	24	21	110.2	8	8	0	5.61	47
Mike Maddux	36	4	89.2	4	1	1	3.61	65
Vaughn Eshelman	23	14	81.2	6	3	0	4.85	41
Stan Belinda	63	0	69.2	8	1	10	3.10	57
Joe Hudson	39	0	46.0	0	1	1	4.11	29
Ken Ryan	28	0	32.2	0	4	7	4.96	34
Aaron Sele	6	6	32.1	3	1	0	3.06	21
Rick Aguilera	30	0	30.1	2	2	20	2.67	23
Alejandro Peña	17	0	24.1	1	1	0	7.40	25
Derek Lilliquist	28	0	23.0	2	1	0	6.26	9
Jeff Suppan	8	3	22.2	1	2	0	5.96	19
Mike Stanton	22	0	21.0	1	0	0	3.00	10
Frank Rodriguez	9	2	15.1	0	2	0	10.57	14
Jeff Pierce	12	0	15.0	0	3	0	6.60	12
Eric Gunderson	19	0	12.1	2	1	0	5.11	9
Mike Hartley	5	0	7.0	0	0	0	9.00	2
Tim Van Egmond	4	1	6.2	0	1	0	9.45	5
Brian Looney	3	1	4.2	0	1	0	17.36	2
Joel Johnston	4	0	4.0	0	1	0	11.25	4
Matt Murray	2	1	3.1	0	1	0	18.90	1
Brian Bark	3	0	2.1	0	0	0	0.00	0
Keith Shepherd	2	0	1.0	0	0	0	36.00	0

== ALDS ==
Game	Score	Date
1	Boston 4, Cleveland 5	October 3, 1995
2	Boston 0, Cleveland 4	October 4, 1995
3	Cleveland 8, Boston 2	October 6, 1995

== Farm system ==
The Trenton Thunder replaced the New Britain Red Sox as the Red Sox' Double-A affiliate. The Class A Michigan Battle Cats replaced the Class A-Advanced Lynchburg Red Sox.

Level	Team	League	Manager
AAA	Pawtucket Red Sox	International League	Buddy Bailey
AA	Trenton Thunder	Eastern League	Ken Macha
A-Advanced	Sarasota Red Sox	Florida State League	Tom Barrett
A	Michigan Battle Cats	Midwest League	DeMarlo Hale
A-Short Season	Utica Blue Sox	New York–Penn League	Bob Geren
Rookie	GCL Red Sox	Gulf Coast League	Felix Maldonado

== Game log ==
Red Sox Win	Red Sox Loss	Game postponed	Clinched Playoff Spot	Clinched Division

1995 Boston Red Sox Season Game Log: 86–58 (Home: 42–30; Away: 44–28)
April: 3–1

#	Date	Opponent	Score	Win	Loss	Save	Stadium	Attendance	Record	Streak
1	April 26	Twins	9–0	Sele (1–0)	Erickson (0–1)	—	Fenway Park	32,980	1–0	W1
2	April 28	White Sox	10–4	Cormier (1–0)	Bere (0–1)	—	Fenway Park	23,199	2–0	W2
3	April 29	White Sox	8–0	Hanson (1–0)	Álvarez (0–1)	—	Fenway Park	27,631	3–0	W3
4	April 30	White Sox	11–17	DeLeon (1–0)	Rodriguez (0–1)	—	Fenway Park	30,658	3–1	L1

May: 17–10

#	Date	Opponent	Score	Win	Loss	Save	Stadium	Attendance	Record	Streak
5	May 1	@ Yankees	3–5	Howe (1–0)	Lilliquist (0–1)	Wetteland (3)	Yankee Stadium	17,412	3–2	L2
6	May 2	@ Yankees	8–0	Eshelman (1–0)	Hitchcock (0–1)	—	Yankee Stadium	13,694	4–2	W1
7	May 3	@ Yankees	3–4 (13)	Wickman (1–0)	Pierce (0–1)	—	Yankee Stadium	19,990	4–3	L1
8	May 4	@ Yankees	3–5	Ausanio (1–0)	Johnston (0–1)	Wetteland (4)	Yankee Stadium	18,994	4–4	L2
9	May 5	@ Tigers	10–7	Lilliquist (1–1)	Lira (0–1)	Ryan (1)	Tiger Stadium	10,041	5–4	W1
10	May 6	@ Tigers	5–3	Sele (2–0)	Bergman (0–3)	Belinda (1)	Tiger Stadium	16,564	6–4	W2
11	May 7	@ Tigers	12–1	Eshelman (2–0)	Groom (0–1)	—	Tiger Stadium	10,752	7–4	W3
12	May 9	Orioles	4–3	Belinda (1–0)	Benítez (0–2)	—	Fenway Park	22,006	8–4	W4
13	May 10	Orioles	6–2	Hanson (2–0)	Fernandez (0–1)	—	Fenway Park	19,776	9–4	W5
—	May 11	Orioles	Postponed (rain). Makeup date August 10.							
14	May 12	Yankees	2–12	Hitchcock (1–2)	Sele (2–1)	—	Fenway Park	32,754	9–5	L1
15	May 13	Yankees	6–4	Eshelman (3–0)	Wickman (1–1)	Ryan (2)	Fenway Park	32,695	10–5	W1
16	May 14	Yankees	3–2	Peña (1–0)	Howe (1–1)	—	Fenway Park	32,526	11–5	W2
17	May 16	@ Brewers	5–0	Hanson (3–0)	Scanlan (1–1)	—	Milwaukee County Stadium	7,714	12–5	W3
18	May 17	@ Brewers	8–2	Sele (3–1)	Bones (2–1)	—	Milwaukee County Stadium	10,934	13–5	W4
19	May 18	Indians	4–3	Belinda (2–0)	Poole (1–2)	—	Fenway Park	24,285	14–5	W5
20	May 19	Indians	5–9	Julián Tavárez (1–0)	Ryan (0–1)	—	Fenway Park	23,507	14–6	L1
21	May 20	Indians	5–7	Plunk (2–0)	Peña (1–1)	Mesa (4)	Fenway Park	29,412	14–7	L2
22	May 21	Indians	10–12	Assenmacher (1–0)	Pierce (0–2)	Mesa (5)	Fenway Park	32,339	14–8	L3
23	May 23	@ Mariners	5–4 (10)	Belinda (3–0)	Frey (0–2)	Ryan (3)	Kingdome	11,858	15–8	W1
24	May 24	@ Mariners	6–15	Carmona (1–1)	Pierce (0–3)	Nelson (1)	Kingdome	10,041	15–9	L1
25	May 25	@ Mariners	3–4	Belcher (2–0)	Smith (0–1)	Ayala (6)	Kingdome	12,194	15–10	L2
26	May 26	@ Angels	8–3	Hanson (4–0)	Williams (1–2)	—	Anaheim Stadium	27,816	16–10	W1
27	May 27	@ Angels	12–1	Wakefield (1–0)	Bielecki (2–1)	—	Anaheim Stadium	29,792	17–10	W2
28	May 28	@ Angels	3–8	Finley (2–4)	Van Egmond (0–1)	—	Anaheim Stadium	27,497	17–11	L1
29	May 29	@ Athletics	9–6	Smith (1–1)	Stewart (2–4)	—	Oakland-Alameda County Coliseum	30,846	18–11	W1
30	May 30	@ Athletics	1–0	Wakefield (2–0)	Darling (1–2)	Ryan (4)	Oakland-Alameda County Coliseum	11,224	19–11	W2
31	May 31	@ Athletics	6–5	Hanson (5–0)	Stottlemyre (3–1)	Ryan (5)	Oakland-Alameda County Coliseum	14,616	20–11	W3

June: 14–14

#	Date	Opponent	Score	Win	Loss	Save	Stadium	Attendance	Record	Streak
32	June 2	Mariners	6–5 (10)	Belinda (4–0)	Torres (0–2)	—	Fenway Park	33,476	21–11	W4
33	June 3	Mariners	10–8	Cormier (2–0)	Carmona (1–2)	Ryan (6)	Kingdome	27,301	22–11	W5
34	June 4	Mariners	2–1 (10)	Wakefield (3–0)	Ayala (1–1)	—	Fenway Park	28,512	23–11	W6
35	June 5	Angels	3–2	Hanson (6–0)	Bielecki (2–2)	Ryan (7)	Fenway Park	22,027	24–11	W7
36	June 6	Angels	3–12	Langston (4–1)	Looney (0–1)	James (1)	Fenway Park	23,977	24–12	L1
37	June 7	Angels	5–1	Clemens (1–0)	Finley (3–5)	—	Fenway Park	23,372	25–12	W1
38	June 8	Angels	8–10	Butcher (5–0)	Cormier (2–1)	Smith (15)	Fenway Park	25,336	25–13	L1
39	June 9	Athletics	4–1	Wakefield (4–0)	Stewart (3–5)	—	Fenway Park	30,304	26–13	W1
40	June 10	Athletics	5–8	Corsi (2–0)	Maddux (1–1)	—	Fenway Park	31,418	26–14	L1
41	June 11	Athletics	1–8	Stottlemyre (5–1)	Smith (1–2)	—	Fenway Park	29,737	26–15	L2
42	June 12	@ Blue Jays	3–4 (12)	Timlin (3–0)	Ryan (0–2)	—	SkyDome	40,171	26–16	L3
43	June 13	@ Blue Jays	11–7	Maddux (2–1)	Hentgen (4–4)	—	SkyDome	36,297	27–16	W1
44	June 14	@ Blue Jays	3–5	Leiter (5–2)	Wakefield (4–1)	Castillo (1)	SkyDome	37,898	27–17	L1
45	June 16	Brewers	3–4	Miranda (4–2)	Hanson (6–1)	Fetters (5)	Fenway Park	29,086	27–18	L2
46	June 17	Brewers	1–9	Sparks (2–2)	Clemens (1–1)	—	Fenway Park	29,882	27–19	L3
47	June 18	Brewers	4–2	Smith (2–2)	Bones (4–4)	Belinda (2)	Fenway Park	28,646	28–19	W1
48	June 19	@ Indians	3–4 (10)	Plunk (4–1)	Ryan (0–3)	—	Jacobs Field	41,645	28–20	L1
49	June 20	@ Indians	2–9	Ogea (3–0)	Eshelman (3–1)	—	Jacobs Field	40,190	28–21	L2
50	June 21	@ Indians	3–1	Hanson (7–1)	Hershiser (5–3)	Belinda (3)	Jacobs Field	41,948	29–21	W1
51	June 22	@ Orioles	4–1	Clemens (2–1)	Brown (5–6)	Belinda (4)	Camden Yards	45,081	30–21	W2
52	June 23	@ Orioles	5–7	Mussina (6–5)	Smith (2–3)	Lee (1)	Camden Yards	46,306	30–22	L1
53	June 24	@ Orioles	6–5	Cormier (3–1)	Orosco (1–1)	Belinda (5)	Camden Yards	47,262	31–22	W1
54	June 25	@ Orioles	1–10	Rhodes (2–2)	Eshelman (3–2)	—	Camden Yards	47,561	31–23	L1
55	June 26	Blue Jays	4–3	Belinda (5–0)	Castillo (0–2)	—	Fenway Park	26,716	32–23	W1
56	June 27	Blue Jays	6–5 (11)	Lilliquist (2–1)	Williams (0–2)	—	Fenway Park	30,262	33–23	W2
57	June 28	Blue Jays	4–8	Cone (6–4)	Smith (2–4)	—	Fenway Park	31,467	33–24	L1
58	June 29	Tigers	7–1	Wakefield (5–1)	Moore (5–6)	—	Fenway Park	28,457	34–24	W1
59	June 30	Tigers	6–7	Boever (4–3)	Ryan (0–4)	Henneman (14)	Fenway Park	31,349	34–25	L1

July: 14–13

#	Date	Opponent	Score	Win	Loss	Save	Stadium	Attendance	Record	Streak
60	July 1	Tigers	2–11	Lira (5–4)	Hanson (7–2)	Doherty (1)	Fenway Park	33,359	34–26	L2
61	July 2	Tigers	12–11	Belinda (6–0)	Boever (4–4)	—	Fenway Park	34,344	35–26	W1
62	July 3	@ Royals	12–5	Smith (3–4)	Appier (11–4)	Maddux (1)	Kauffman Stadium	24,742	36–26	W2
63	July 4	@ Royals	6–5	Wakefield (6–1)	Gubicza (5–7)	Belinda (6)	Kauffman Stadium	26,584	37–26	W3
64	July 5	@ Royals	2–3	Pichardo (5–3)	Rodriguez (0–2)	—	Kauffman Stadium	7,511	37–27	L1
65	July 6	@ Twins	4–6	Radke (5–7)	Smith (3–5)	Stevens (1)	Metrodome	11,934	37–28	L2
66	July 7	@ Twins	5–4	Belinda (7–0)	Guardado (0–7)	Aguilera (13)	Metrodome	12,594	38–28	W1
67	July 8	@ Twins	5–9	Guthrie (4–3)	Belinda (7–1)	—	Metrodome	14,838	38–29	L1
68	July 9	@ Twins	7–0	Wakefield (7–1)	Rodriguez (0–3)	—	Metrodome	18,574	39–29	W1
69	July 13	Rangers	8–9	Vosberg (4–2)	Clemens (2–2)	Russell (13)	Fenway Park	33,315	39–30	L1
70	July 14	Rangers	5–2	Wakefield (8–1)	Pavlik (5–5)	Aguilera (14)	Fenway Park	32,348	40–30	W1
71	July 15	Rangers	2–7	Gross (4–8)	Hanson (7–3)	—	Fenway Park	34,004	40–31	L1
72	July 16	Rangers	2–5	Rogers (9–4)	Smith (3–6)	Russell (14)	Fenway Park	30,295	40–32	L2
73	July 17	Royals	3–4	Gubicza (7–7)	Suppan (0–1)	Montgomery (16)	Fenway Park	24,891	40–33	L3
74	July 18	Royals	4–1	Clemens (3–2)	Gordon (6–6)	Aguilera (15)	Fenway Park	26,960	41–33	W1
75	July 19	@ White Sox	5–3	Wakefield (9–1)	Sirotka (0–1)	Aguilera (16)	Comiskey Park	22,391	42–33	W2
76	July 20	@ White Sox	3–1	Hanson (8–3)	McCaskill (4–3)	Aguilera (17)	Comiskey Park	21,235	43–33	W3
77	July 21	Twins	13–5	Smith (4–6)	Trombley (1–5)	Hudson (1)	Fenway Park	31,124	44–33	W4
78	July 22	Twins	7–8	Guthrie (5–3)	Suppan (0–2)	Stevens (2)	Fenway Park	34,384	44–34	L1
79	July 23	Twins	3–8	Tapani (5–11)	Clemens (3–3)	—	Fenway Park	34,205	44–35	L2
80	July 24	Twins	4–1	Wakefield (10–1)	Radke (7–8)	Aguilera (18)	Fenway Park	26,333	45–35	W1
81	July 25	White Sox	3–8	Bere (5–8)	Cormier (3–2)	Hernández (14)	Fenway Park	33,069	45–36	L1
82	July 26	White Sox	5–3	Smith (5–6)	Fernandez (4–7)	Aguilera (19)	Fenway Park	33,457	46–36	W1
83	July 27	White Sox	4–5	Karchner (1–0)	Aguilera (1–2)	Hernández (15)	Fenway Park	34,474	46–37	L1
84	July 28	@ Rangers	6–2	Maddux (3–1)	Taylor (0–1)	—	The Ballpark in Arlington	39,199	47–37	W1
85	July 29	@ Rangers	7–1	Wakefield (11–1)	Gross (4–10)	—	The Ballpark in Arlington	46,717	48–37	W2
86	July 30	@ Rangers	6–7	Whiteside (3–3)	Hanson (8–4)	Russell (16)	The Ballpark in Arlington	37,219	48–38	L1

August: 23–7

#	Date	Opponent	Score	Win	Loss	Save	Stadium	Attendance	Record	Streak
87	August 1	@ Tigers	13–3	Smith (6–6)	Moore (5–11)	—	Tiger Stadium	20,170	49–38	W1
88	August 2	@ Tigers	0–5	Bergman (4–6)	Clemens (3–4)	—	Tiger Stadium	16,488	49–39	L1
89	August 3	@ Tigers	10–2	Wakefield (12–1)	Nitkowski (1–4)	—	Tiger Stadium	11,451	50–39	W1
90	August 4	@ Blue Jays	7–1	Hanson (9–4)	Rogers (0–1)	—	SkyDome	40,137	51–39	W2
91	August 5	@ Blue Jays	9–3	Cormier (4–2)	Hentgen (8–9)	—	SkyDome	41,454	52–39	W3
92	August 6	@ Blue Jays	6–4	Eshelman (4–2)	Hurtado (3–1)	Aguilera (20)	SkyDome	38,194	53–39	W4
93	August 7	@ Blue Jays	5–4 (10)	Belinda (8–1)	Crabtree (0–2)	—	SkyDome	42,135	54–39	W5
94	August 8	Indians	5–1	Wakefield (13–1)	Clark (6–4)	—	Fenway Park	34,574	55–39	W6
95	August 9	Indians	9–5	Hanson (10–4)	Plunk (5–2)	—	Fenway Park	34,240	56–39	W7
96	August 10	Orioles	11–1	Cormier (5–2)	Erickson (7–9)	—	Fenway Park	—	57–39	W8
97	August 11	Orioles	5–4 (12)	Aguilera (2–2)	Clark (2–3)	—	Fenway Park	33,143	58–39	W9
98	August 12	Orioles	7–0	Clemens (4–4)	Mussina (13–7)	—	Fenway Park	34,234	59–39	W10
99	August 13	Orioles	3–2	Wakefield (14–1)	Krivda (0–2)	Belinda (7)	Fenway Park	34,158	60–39	W11
100	August 14	Yankees	9–3	Hanson (11–4)	Kamieniecki (3–4)	—	Fenway Park	34,319	61–39	W12
101	August 15	Yankees	2–9	Hitchcock (6–7)	Cormier (5–3)	—	Fenway Park	34,616	61–40	L1
102	August 16	Yankees	7–4	Gunderson (2–1)	Wickman (2–4)	Belinda (8)	Fenway Park	34,304	62–40	W1
103	August 17	@ Angels	4–3	Gunderson (3–1)	Habyan (3–4)	Belinda (9)	Anaheim Stadium	25,435	63–40	W2
104	August 18	@ Mariners	3–9	Wolcott (1–0)	Wakefield (14–2)	—	Kingdome	27,256	63–41	L1
105	August 19	@ Mariners	4–3	Hanson (12–4)	Benes (6–8)	Aguilera (21)	Kingdome	36,007	64–41	W1
106	August 20	@ Mariners	7–6	Cormier (6–3)	Bosio (8–6)	Aguilera (22)	Kingdome	21,813	65–41	W2
107	August 21	@ Angels	6–4	Eshelman (5–2)	Anderson (6–5)	Belinda (10)	Anaheim Stadium	23,943	66–41	W3
108	August 22	@ Angels	6–4	Clemens (5–4)	Harkey (7–8)	Aguilera (23)	Anaheim Stadium	27,822	67–41	W4
109	August 23	@ Angels	6–5 (10)	Stanton (2–1)	Smith (0–5)	Aguilera (24)	Anaheim Stadium	29,053	68–41	W5
110	August 24	@ Athletics	13–6	Hanson (13–4)	Ontiveros (8–5)	—	Oakland-Alameda County Coliseum	13,922	69–41	W6
111	August 25	@ Athletics	1–6	Johns (2–0)	Cormier (6–4)	—	Oakland-Alameda County Coliseum	17,156	69–42	L1
112	August 26	@ Athletics	4–11	Stottlemyre (12–5)	Smith (6–7)	—	Oakland-Alameda County Coliseum	23,177	69–43	L2
113	August 27	@ Athletics	4–1	Clemens (6–4)	Van Poppel (3–5)	Aguilera (25)	Oakland-Alameda County Coliseum	24,220	70–43	W1
114	August 29	Mariners	4–6	Benes (7–8)	Wakefield (14–3)	Charlton (3)	Fenway Park	31,328	70–44	L1
115	August 30	Mariners	7–6	Maddux (4–1)	Nelson (5–2)	Aguilera (26)	Fenway Park	32,356	71–44	W1
116	August 31	Mariners	2–11	Wolcott (2–1)	Cormier (6–5)	Guetterman (1)	Fenway Park	30,627	71–45	L1

September / October: 15–13

#	Date	Opponent	Score	Win	Loss	Save	Stadium	Attendance	Record	Streak
117	September 1	Angels	11–3	Clemens (7–4)	Boskie (6–3)	—	Fenway Park	32,861	72–45	W1
118	September 2	Angels	5–4	Smith (7–7)	Langston (13–4)	Aguilera (27)	Fenway Park	32,867	73–45	W2
119	September 3	Angels	8–1	Wakefield (15–3)	Finley (13–10)	—	Fenway Park	32,987	74–45	W3
120	September 5	Athletics	7–4 (14)	Aguilera (3–2)	Reyes (3–5)	—	Fenway Park	27,080	75–45	W4
121	September 6	Athletics	8–2	Clemens (8–4)	Johns (3–1)	—	Fenway Park	30,454	76–45	W5
122	September 8	@ Yankees	4–8	Cone (15–7)	Wakefield (15–4)	Howe (2)	Yankee Stadium	35,896	76–46	L1
123	September 9	@ Yankees	1–9	Pettitte (9–8)	Smith (7–8)	—	Yankee Stadium	47,719	76–47	L2
124	September 10	@ Yankees	3–9	Hitchcock (8–9)	Hanson (13–5)	—	Yankee Stadium	27,527	76–48	L3
125	September 11	@ Orioles	10–7	Lee (2–0)	Gunderson (3–2)	Jones (22)	Camden Yards	40,585	76–49	L4
126	September 12	@ Orioles	5–6	Hartley (1–0)	Hudson (0–1)	Orosco (2)	Camden Yards	40,282	76–50	L5
127	September 13	@ Orioles	2–0	Wakefield (16–4)	Haynes (0–1)	Aguilera (28)	Camden Yards	41,536	77–50	W1
128	September 14	@ Indians	3–5	Hershiser (14–6)	Eshelman (5–3)	Mesa (43)	Jacobs Field	41,812	77–51	L1
129	September 15	@ Indians	6–3	Hanson (14–5)	Embree (2–2)	—	Jacobs Field	41,833	78–51	W1
130	September 16	@ Indians	5–6	Clark (9–6)	Clemens (8–5)	Mesa (44)	Jacobs Field	41,765	78–52	L1
131	September 17	@ Indians	9–6	Suppan (1–2)	Shuey (0–2)	Aguilera (29)	Jacobs Field	41,723	79–52	W1
132	September 18	Brewers	1–6	Bones (10–10)	Wakefield (16–5)	—	Fenway Park	28,176	79–53	L1
133	September 19	Brewers	5–3	Eshelman (6–3)	Sparks (8–10)	Aguilera (30)	Fenway Park	27,060	80–53	W1
134	September 20	Brewers	3–2	Cormier (7–5)	Karl (5–6)	Aguilera (31)	Fenway Park	32,563	81–53	W2
—	September 22	Blue Jays	Postponed (rain). Makeup date September 23.							
135	September 23 (1)	Blue Jays	5–0	Clemens (9–5)	Leiter (11–10)	—	Fenway Park	32,791	82–53	W3
136	September 23 (2)	Blue Jays	6–8	Ware (2–1)	Wakefield (16–6)	Castillo (13)	Fenway Park	21,266	82–54	L1
137	September 24	Blue Jays	1–2	Guzmán (4–14)	Aguilera (3–3)	Timlin (5)	Fenway Park	32,427	82–55	L2
138	September 25	Tigers	4–7	Gohr (1–0)	Murray (0–3)	Doherty (6)	Fenway Park	25,662	82–56	L3
139	September 26	Tigers	5–1	Smith (8–8)	Nitkowski (2–7)	—	Fenway Park	24,032	83–56	W1
140	September 27	Tigers	5–7	Lima (3–9)	Wakefield (16–7)	Blomdahl (1)	Fenway Park	30,989	83–57	L1
141	September 28	@ Brewers	11–6	Clemens (10–5)	Scanlan (4–7)	—	Milwaukee County Stadium	8,286	84–57	W1
142	September 29	@ Brewers	11–9	Hanson (15–5)	Bones (10–12)	Aguilera (32)	Milwaukee County Stadium	10,775	85–57	W2
143	September 30	@ Brewers	9–1	Maddux (5–1)	Sparks (9–11)	—	Milwaukee County Stadium	14,610	86–57	W3
144	October 1	@ Brewers	1–8	Karl (6–7)	Wakefield (16–8)	—	Milwaukee County Stadium	15,453	86–58	L1

=== Postseason game log ===
Boston Red Sox 1995 Postseason Game Log (0–3)
American League Division Series vs. Cleveland Indians (0–3)

#/	Date	Opponent	Score	Win	Loss	Save	Stadium	Attendance	Series	Streak
1	October 3	@ Indians	4–5 (14)	Hill (1–0)	Smith (0–1)	—	Jacobs Field	44,218	0–1	L1
2	October 4	@ Indians	0–4	Hershiser (1–0)	Hanson (0–1)	—	Jacobs Field	44,262	0–2	L2
3	October 6	Indians	2–8	Nagy (1–0)	Wakefield (0–1)	—	Fenway Park	34,211	0–3	L3
Red Sox Lose Series 0–3

== Awards and honors ==
- Erik Hanson – AL Pitcher of the Month (August)
- John Valentin – Silver Slugger Award (SS)
- Mo Vaughn – Silver Slugger Award (1B), American League MVP
- Tim Wakefield – AL Pitcher of the Month (July)

All-Star Game

- Erik Hanson, reserve P
- Mo Vaughn, reserve 1B
