= 1995 New York Yankees season =

Season for the Major League Baseball team the New York Yankees

1995 New York Yankees
- American League Wild Card winners
- League: American League
- Division: East
- Ballpark: Yankee Stadium
- City: New York
- Record: 79–65 (.549)
- Divisional place: 2nd
- Owners: George Steinbrenner
- General managers: Gene Michael
- Managers: Buck Showalter
- Television: WPIX (Phil Rizzuto, Bobby Murcer, Paul Olden); MSG (Jim Kaat, Dave Cohen, Al Trautwig)
- Radio: WABC (AM) (Michael Kay, John Sterling)

The 1995 New York Yankees season was the 93rd season for the Yankees, and their 71st playing home games at Yankee Stadium. Managed by Buck Showalter, the team finished with a record of 79–65, seven games behind the Boston Red Sox, and returned to postseason play for the first time since the 1981 season. They won the first American League Wild Card. In the Division Series, they squandered a 2–0 series lead, losing three straight games at the Kingdome to succumb to the Seattle Mariners in five games. The team is notable for witnessing the big league debuts of the so-called Core Four, which would soon lead the team to championship glory.

== Offseason ==
- December 14, 1994: Jack McDowell was traded by the Chicago White Sox to the New York Yankees for a player to be named later and Keith Heberling, a minor leaguer. The New York Yankees sent Lyle Mouton (April 22, 1995) to the White Sox to complete the trade.
- December 15, 1994: Tony Fernández was signed as a free agent with the New York Yankees.

== Regular season ==
- On May 29, 1995, Derek Jeter made his major league baseball debut. It was in a game against the Seattle Mariners. Jeter had 5 at-bats and had 0 hits.
- On September 11, 1995, pitcher Jack McDowell threw exactly three pitches and recorded three outs. This was accomplished in the ninth inning. This was also only the third time in MLB history where a team completed a nine-inning game without recording a single fielding assist, meaning that no one was thrown out and all the outs were recorded with fly balls or strikeouts. The only other teams to do it were Cleveland in 1945 and the NY Mets in 1989.

=== Season standings ===
AL East
| Team | W | L | Pct. | GB | Home | Road |
|---|---|---|---|---|---|---|
| Boston Red Sox | 86 | 58 | .597 | — | 42‍–‍30 | 44‍–‍28 |
| New York Yankees | 79 | 65 | .549 | 7 | 46‍–‍26 | 33‍–‍39 |
| Baltimore Orioles | 71 | 73 | .493 | 15 | 36‍–‍36 | 35‍–‍37 |
| Detroit Tigers | 60 | 84 | .417 | 26 | 35‍–‍37 | 25‍–‍47 |
| Toronto Blue Jays | 56 | 88 | .389 | 30 | 29‍–‍43 | 27‍–‍45 |

=== Record vs. opponents ===
1995 American League record Source: MLB Standings Grid – 1995
| Team | BAL | BOS | CAL | CWS | CLE | DET | KC | MIL | MIN | NYY | OAK | SEA | TEX | TOR |
|---|---|---|---|---|---|---|---|---|---|---|---|---|---|---|
| Baltimore | — | 4–9 | 9–4 | 6–1 | 2–10 | 8–5 | 4–5 | 7–5 | 3–6 | 6–7 | 5–7 | 6–7 | 4–1 | 7–6 |
| Boston | 9–4 | — | 11–3 | 5–3 | 6–7 | 8–5 | 3–2 | 8–4 | 5–4 | 5–8 | 8–4 | 7–5 | 3–4 | 8–5 |
| California | 4–9 | 3–11 | — | 10–2 | 3–2 | 6–2 | 5–7 | 5–2 | 8–5 | 7–5 | 6–7 | 7–6 | 6–7 | 8–2 |
| Chicago | 1–6 | 3–5 | 2–10 | — | 5–8 | 8–4 | 8–5 | 6–7 | 10–3 | 3–2–1 | 7–5 | 4–9 | 5–7 | 6–5 |
| Cleveland | 10–2 | 7–6 | 2–3 | 8–5 | — | 10–3 | 11–1 | 9–4 | 9–4 | 6–6 | 7–0 | 5–4 | 6–3 | 10–3 |
| Detroit | 5–8 | 5–8 | 2–6 | 4–8 | 3–10 | — | 3–4 | 8–5 | 7–5 | 5–8 | 2–3 | 5–5 | 4–8 | 7–6 |
| Kansas City | 5–4 | 2–3 | 7–5 | 5–8 | 1–11 | 4–3 | — | 10–2 | 6–7 | 3–7 | 5–8 | 7–5 | 8–6 | 7–5 |
| Milwaukee | 5–7 | 4–8 | 2–5 | 7–6 | 4–9 | 5–8 | 2–10 | — | 9–4 | 5–6 | 7–2 | 3–2 | 5–7 | 7–5 |
| Minnesota | 6–3 | 4–5 | 5–8 | 3–10 | 4–9 | 5–7 | 7–6 | 4–9 | — | 3–4 | 5–7 | 4–8 | 5–8 | 1–4 |
| New York | 7–6 | 8–5 | 5–7 | 2–3–1 | 6–6 | 8–5 | 7–3 | 6–5 | 4–3 | — | 4–9 | 4–9 | 6–3 | 12–1 |
| Oakland | 7–5 | 4–8 | 7–6 | 5–7 | 0–7 | 3–2 | 8–5 | 2–7 | 7–5 | 9–4 | — | 7–6 | 5–8 | 3–7 |
| Seattle | 7–6 | 5–7 | 6–7 | 9–4 | 4–5 | 5–5 | 5–7 | 2–3 | 8–4 | 9–4 | 6–7 | — | 10–3 | 3–4 |
| Texas | 1–4 | 4–3 | 7–6 | 7–5 | 3–6 | 8–4 | 6–8 | 7–5 | 8–5 | 3–6 | 8–5 | 3–10 | — | 9–3 |
| Toronto | 6–7 | 5–8 | 2–8 | 5–6 | 3–10 | 6–7 | 5–7 | 5–7 | 4–1 | 1–12 | 7–3 | 4–3 | 3–9 | — |

=== Transactions ===
- April 12, 1995: Randy Velarde was signed as a free agent with the New York Yankees.
- June 5, 1995: Josías Manzanillo was selected off waivers by the New York Yankees from the New York Mets.
- June 8, 1995: Kevin Elster was released by the New York Yankees.
- June 19, 1995: Darryl Strawberry was signed as a free agent with the New York Yankees.
- July 1, 1995: Kevin Maas was signed as a free agent with the New York Yankees.
- July 16, 1995: Dave Silvestri was traded by the New York Yankees to the Montreal Expos for Tyrone Horne (minors).
- July 28, 1995: David Cone was traded by the Toronto Blue Jays to the New York Yankees for Marty Janzen, Jason Jarvis (minors), and Mike Gordon (minors).
- July 28, 1995: Danny Tartabull was traded by the New York Yankees to the Oakland Athletics for Rubén Sierra and Jason Beverlin.
- August 5, 1995: Luis Polonia was traded by the New York Yankees to the Atlanta Braves for Troy Hughes (minors).

==== Draft picks ====
- June 1, 1995: Donzell McDonald was drafted by the New York Yankees in the 22nd round of the 1995 amateur draft. Player signed July 22, 1995.
- June 1, 1995: Future NFL quarterback Daunte Culpepper was drafted by the New York Yankees in the 26th round (730th pick) of the 1995 amateur draft. Culpepper was drafted out of Vanguard High School.

=== Roster ===
1995 New York Yankees
Roster
| Pitchers: 54 Joe Ausanio; 25 Scott Bankhead; 31 Brian Boehringer; 36 David Cone; 47 Dave Eiland; 41 Sterling Hitchcock; 47 Rick Honeycutt; 57 Steve Howe; 28 Scott Kamieniecki; 22 Jimmy Key; 34 Rob MacDonald; 38 Josías Manzanillo; 19 Jack McDowell; 39 Jeff Patterson; 56 Dave Pavlas; 33 Mélido Pérez; 46 Andy Pettitte; 42 Mariano Rivera; 35 John Wetteland; 27 Bob Wickman | Catchers: 13 Jim Leyritz; 62 Jorge Posada; 20 Mike Stanley; Infielders: 12 Wade Boggs; 24 Russ Davis; 50 Robert Eenhoorn; 26 Kevin Elster; 6 Tony Fernández; 2 Derek Jeter; 14 Pat Kelly; 23 Don Mattingly; 43 Dave Silvestri; 18 Randy Velarde | Outfielders: 39 Dion James; 21 Paul O'Neill; 17 Luis Polonia; 17,25 Rubén Rivera; 26 Darryl Strawberry; 45 Danny Tartabull; 51 Bernie Williams; 29 Gerald Williams | Manager: 11 Buck Showalter; Coaches: 6 Clete Boyer; 55 Brian Butterfield (First Base); 40 Tony Cloninger; 36 Billy Connors; 48 Rick Down; 30 Willie Randolph (Third Base); 53 Glenn Sherlock (Bullpen Catcher) |

=== Death of Mickey Mantle ===
Shortly before his death, Mantle videotaped a message to be played on Old-Timers' Day, which he was too ill to attend. He said, "When I die, I wanted on my tombstone, 'A great teammate.' But I didn't think it would be this soon." The words were indeed carved on the plaque marking his resting place at the family mausoleum in Dallas.

Mantle received a liver transplant at Baylor University Medical Center in Dallas, on June 8, 1995, after his liver had been damaged by years of chronic alcoholism, cirrhosis and hepatitis C. In July, he had recovered enough to deliver a press conference at Baylor, and noted that many fans had looked to him as a role model. "This is a role model: Don't be like me", he said. He also established the Mickey Mantle Foundation to raise awareness for organ donations. Soon, he was back in the hospital, where it was found that his liver cancer spread throughout his body.

Mickey Mantle died on August 13, 1995, at Baylor University Medical Center in Dallas. He was 63 years old. During the first Yankee home game after Mantle's passing, Eddie Layton played "Somewhere Over the Rainbow" on the Hammond organ at Yankee Stadium because Mickey had once told him it was his favorite song. The Yankees played the rest of the season with black mourning bands topped by a small number 7 on their left sleeves.

Phil Rizzuto, angered over the refusal of television station WPIX to give him a day off to attend his former teammate's funeral, abruptly resigned from his play-by-play announcing job with the station on August 19. He would return to call a partial schedule for the station in 1996 before retiring for good.

== Game log ==
=== Regular season ===
1995 regular season game log: 79–65–1 (Home: 46–26–1; Away: 33–39)
April: 3–1 (Home: 1–0; Away: 2–1)

| # | Date | Time (ET) | Opponent | Score | Win | Loss | Save | Time of Game | Attendance | Record | Box/ Streak |

May: 10–16 (Home: 6–5; Away: 4–11)

| # | Date | Time (ET) | Opponent | Score | Win | Loss | Save | Time of Game | Attendance | Record | Box/ Streak |
|---|---|---|---|---|---|---|---|---|---|---|---|
| 5 | May 1 | 7:40 p.m. EDT | Red Sox | **W** 5–3 | **Howe** (1–0) | Lilliquist (0–1) | **Wetteland** (3) | 2:30 | 17,412 | 4–1 | W1 |
| 6 | May 2 | 7:36 p.m. EDT | Red Sox | L 0–8 | Eshelman (1–0) | **Hitchcock** (0–1) | – | 2:25 | 13,694 | 4–2 | L1 |
| 7 | May 3 | 7:36 p.m. EDT | Red Sox | **W** 4–3 (13) | **Wickman** (1–0) | Pierce (0–1) | – | 4:06 | 19,990 | 5–2 | W1 |
| 8 | May 4 | 7:36 p.m. EDT | Red Sox | **W** 5–3 | **Ausanio** (1–0) | Johnston (0–1) | – | 3:01 | 18,994 | 6–2 | W2 |
| 15 | May 12 | 7:07 p.m. EDT | @ Red Sox | **W** 12–2 | **Hitchcock** (1–2) | Sele (2–1) | – | 3:08 | 32,754 | 10–5 | W1 |
| 16 | May 13 | 1:07 p.m. EDT | @ Red Sox | L 4–6 | Eshelman (3–0) | **Wickman** (1–1) | Ryan (2) | 3:10 | 32,695 | 10–6 | L1 |
| 17 | May 14 | 1:07 p.m. EDT | @ Red Sox | L 2–3 | Peña (1–0) | **Howe** (1–1) | – | 2:49 | 32,526 | 10–7 | L2 |
| 18 | May 16 | 7:35 p.m. EDT | Indians | L 5–10 | Nagy (2–0) | **Key** (1–2) | – | 3:00 | 18,246 | 10–8 | L3 |
| 22 | May 23 | | @ Angels | L 0–10 | | | | | | 12–10 | L1 |
| 23 | May 24 | | @ Angels | L 1–3 | | | | | | 12–11 | L2 |
| 24 | May 25 | | @ Angels | L 2–15 | | | | | | 12–12 | L3 |
| 28 | May 29 | 8:07 p.m. EDT | @ Mariners | L 7–8 (12) | Ayala (1–0) | **Bankhead** (1–1) | – | 4:05 | 18,948 | 13–15 | L1 |
| 29 | May 30 | 10:05 p.m. EDT | @ Mariners | L 3–7 | Nelson (2–0) | **Pérez** (2–2) | – | 3:08 | 10,709 | 13–16 | L2 |
| 30 | May 31 | 10:36 p.m. EDT | @ Mariners | L 9–11 | Wells (2–3) | **MacDonald** (0–1) | Ayala (8) | 3:38 | 13,035 | 13–17 | L3 |

June: 13–14 (Home: 8–8; Away: 5–6)

| # | Date | Time (ET) | Opponent | Score | Win | Loss | Save | Time of Game | Attendance | Record | Box/ Streak |
|---|---|---|---|---|---|---|---|---|---|---|---|
| 31 | June 2 | | Angels | L 2–3 | | | | | | 13–18 | L4 |
| 32 | June 3 | | Angels | L 2–4 | | | | | | 13–19 | L5 |
| 33 | June 4 | | Angels | **W** 11–3 | | | | | | 14–19 | W1 |
| 38 | June 9 | 7:35 p.m. EDT | Mariners | L 1–11 | Belcher (3–0) | **Pérez** (3–3) | – | 2:49 | 19,650 | 15–23 | L2 |
| 39 | June 10 | 1:37 p.m. EDT | Mariners | L 2–3 | Nelson (3–0) | **Howe** (1–2) | Ayala (9) | 3:03 | 25,279 | 15–24 | L3 |
| 40 | June 11 | 1:37 p.m. EDT | Mariners | **W** 10–7 | **Howe** (2–2) | Frey (0–3) | **Wetteland** (7) | 3:33 | 26,037 | 16–24 | W1 |
| 45 | June 16 | 7:05 p.m. EDT | @ Indians | **W** 4–2 | **Wickman** (2–1) | Poole (1–3) | **Wetteland** (8) | 3:04 | 41,643 | 19–26 | W1 |
| 46 | June 17 | 1:05 p.m. EDT | @ Indians | L 4–7 | Black (3–1) | **Pettitte** (1–4) | Mesa (17) | 2:53 | 41,662 | 19–27 | L1 |
| 47 | June 18 | 8:05 p.m. EDT | @ Indians | **W** 9–5 | **McDowell** (3–4) | Nagy (4–3) | **Wetteland** (9) | 3:13 | 41,667 | 20–27 | W1 |

July: 17–11–1 (Home: 9–4–1; Away: 8–7)

| # | Date | Time (ET) | Opponent | Score | Win | Loss | Save | Time of Game | Attendance | Record | Box/ Streak |
|---|---|---|---|---|---|---|---|---|---|---|---|
**66th All-Star Game in Arlington, TX**
| 72 | July 17 | 8:06 p.m. EDT | White Sox | T 1–1 (7) | – | – | – | 2:16 | 22,707 | 33–38–1 | T1 |

August: 14–17 (Home: 9–6; Away: 5–11)

| # | Date | Time (ET) | Opponent | Score | Win | Loss | Save | Time of Game | Attendance | Record | Box/ Streak |
|---|---|---|---|---|---|---|---|---|---|---|---|
| 96 | August 10 (1) | 4:37 p.m. EDT | Indians | L 9–10 | Poole (2–3) | **Wetteland** (1–2) | Mesa (31) | 2:58 | – | 49–46–1 | L2 |
| 97 | August 10 (2) | 8:06 p.m. EDT | Indians | L 2–5 | Ogea (6–3) | **Hitchcock** (5–7) | Mesa (32) | 3:09 | 48,115 | 49–47–1 | L3 |
| 98 | August 11 | 7:35 p.m. EDT | Indians | L 4–5 | Tavarez (7–1) | **Wetteland** (1–3) | Mesa (33) | 3:59 | 33,739 | 49–48–1 | L4 |
| 99 | August 12 | 8:07 p.m. EDT | Indians | **W** 3–2 | **McDowell** (10–8) | Martínez (9–3) | – | 2:53 | 35,795 | 50–48–1 | W1 |
| 100 | August 13 | 1:43 p.m. EDT | Indians | **W** 4–1 | **Cone** (13–6) | Clark (6–5) | – | 2:27 | 45,866 | 51–48–1 | W2 |
| 101 | August 14 | 7:09 p.m. EDT | @ Red Sox | L 3–9 | Hanson (11–4) | **Kamieniecki** (3–4) | – | 3:04 | 34,319 | 51–49–1 | L1 |
| 102 | August 15 | 7:08 p.m. EDT | @ Red Sox | **W** 9–2 | **Hitchcock** (6–7) | Cormier (5–3) | – | 2:57 | 34,616 | 52–49–1 | W1 |
| 103 | August 16 | 1:08 p.m. EDT | @ Red Sox | L 4–7 | Gunderson (2–1) | **Wickman** (2–4) | Belinda (8) | 2:58 | 34,304 | 52–50–1 | L1 |
| 104 | August 18 | | @ Angels | **W** 7–3 | | | | | | 53–50–1 | W1 |
| 105 | August 19 | | @ Angels | L 3–5 | | | | | | 53–51–1 | L1 |
| 106 | August 20 | | @ Angels | L 5–10 | | | | | | 53–52–1 | L2 |
| 110 | August 24 | 6:37 p.m. EDT | @ Mariners | L 7–9 | Nelson (5–1) | **Wetteland** (1–4) | – | 3:30 | 17,592 | 53–56–1 | L6 |
| 111 | August 25 | 11:07 p.m. EDT | @ Mariners | L 4–7 | Bosio (9–6) | **Pettitte** (6–8) | – | 3:01 | 28,130 | 53–57–1 | L7 |
| 112 | August 26 | 10:05 p.m. EDT | @ Mariners | L 0–7 | Johnson (13–2) | **Hitchcock** (6–9) | – | 2:49 | 41,182 | 53–58–1 | L8 |
| 113 | August 27 | 4:36 p.m. EDT | @ Mariners | **W** 5–2 | **Kamieniecki** (4–5) | Belcher (8–9) | **Wetteland** (23) | 3:32 | 24,913 | 54–58–1 | W1 |
| 115 | August 29 | | Angels | **W** 12–4 | | | | | | 55–58–1 | W2 |
| 116 | August 30 | | Angels | **W** 4–1 | | | | | | 56–58–1 | W3 |
| 117 | August 31 | | Angels | **W** 11–6 | | | | | | 57–58–1 | W4 |

September: 21–6 (Home: 13–3; Away: 8–3)

| # | Date | Time (ET) | Opponent | Score | Win | Loss | Save | Time of Game | Attendance | Record | Box/ Streak |
|---|---|---|---|---|---|---|---|---|---|---|---|
| 121 | September 4 | 1:05 p.m. EDT | Mariners | **W** 13–3 | **Pettitte** (8–8) | Torres (3–9) | – | 3:00 | 24,885 | 60–60–1 | W1 |
| 122 | September 5 | 7:35 p.m. EDT | Mariners | L 5–6 | Wolcott (3–1) | **Rivera** (5–3) | Chalton (6) | 3:08 | 15,340 | 60–61–1 | L1 |
| 123 | September 6 | 7:35 p.m. EDT | Mariners | **W** 4–3 | **McDowell** (13–10) | Belcher (9–10) | – | 2:38 | 15,426 | 61–61–1 | W1 |
| 124 | September 8 | 8:08 p.m. EDT | Red Sox | **W** 8–4 | **Cone** (15–7) | Wakefield (15–4) | **Howe** (2) | 2:40 | 35,896 | 62–61–1 | W2 |
| 125 | September 9 | 1:36 p.m. EDT | Red Sox | **W** 9–1 | **Pettitte** (9–8) | Smith (7–8) | – | 2:39 | 47,719 | 63–61–1 | W3 |
| 126 | September 10 | 8:07 p.m. EDT | Red Sox | **W** 9–3 | **Hitchcock** (8–9) | Hanson (13–5) | – | 2:47 | 27,527 | 64–61–1 | W4 |
| 127 | September 11 | 7:05 p.m. EDT | @ Indians | **W** 4–0 | **McDowell** (14–10) | Martínez (10–5) | – | 2:52 | 41,835 | 65–61–1 | W5 |
| 128 | September 12 | 7:45 p.m. EDT | @ Indians | **W** 9–2 | **Kamieniecki** (5–5) | Hill (8–8) | – | 3:18 | 41,276 | 66–61–1 | W6 |
| 129 | September 13 | 8:52 p.m. EDT | @ Indians | L 0–5 | Nagy (14–5) | **Cone** (15–8) | – | 2:29 | 41,708 | 66–62–1 | L1 |
| 141 | September 26 | 8:07 p.m. EDT | @ Brewers | **W** 5–4 | **Hitchcock** (10–10) | Karl (5–7) | **Wetteland** (30) | 2:57 | 8,618 | 75–65–1 | W1 |
| 142 | September 27 | 2:07 p.m. EDT | @ Brewers | **W** 6–3 | **Cone** (18–8) | Givens (5–7) | – | 2:59 | 8,635 | 76–65–1 | W2 |
| 143 | September 29 | 8:06 p.m. EDT | @ Blue Jays | **W** 4–3 | **Pettitte** (12–9) | Castillo (1–5) | **Wetteland** (31) | 2:50 | 40,318 | 77–65–1 | W3 |
| 144 | September 30 | 1:35 p.m. EDT | @ Blue Jays | **W** 6–1 | **Kamieniecki** (7–6) | Leiter (11–11) | – | 2:40 | 49,233 | 78–65–1 | W4 |

October: 1–0 (Home: 0–0; Away: 1–0)

| # | Date | Time (ET) | Opponent | Score | Win | Loss | Save | Time of Game | Attendance | Record | Box/ Streak |
|---|---|---|---|---|---|---|---|---|---|---|---|
| 145 | October 1 | 1:35 p.m. EDT | @ Blue Jays | **W** 6–1 | **Hitchcock** (11–10) | Hentgen (10–14) | – | 2:55 | 47,182 | 79–65–1 | W5 |

Legend: = Win = Loss = Postponement
Bold = Yankees team member

=== Postseason game log ===
1995 Postseason game log: 2–3 (Home: 2–0; Away: 0–3)
AL Division Series: vs. Seattle Mariners 2–3 (Home: 2–0; Away: 0–3)

| # | Date | Time (ET) | Opponent | Score | Win | Loss | Save | Time of Game | Attendance | Series | Box/ Streak |
|---|---|---|---|---|---|---|---|---|---|---|---|
| 1 | October 3 | 8:07 p.m. EDT | Mariners | **W** 9–6 | **Cone** (1–0) | Nelson (0–1) | – | 3:38 | 57,178 | 1–0 | W1 |
| 2 | October 4 | 8:07 p.m. EDT | Mariners | **W** 7–5 (15) | **Rivera** (1–0) | Belcher (0–1) | – | 5:12 | 57,126 | 2–0 | W2 |
| 3 | October 6 | 8:07 p.m. EDT | @ Mariners | L 4–7 | Johnson (1–0) | **McDowell** (0–1) | Chalton (1) | 3:04 | 57,944 | 2–1 | L1 |
| 4 | October 7 | 7:07 p.m. EDT | @ Mariners | L 8–11 | Charlton (1–0) | **Wetteland** (0–1) | Risley (1) | 4:08 | 57,180 | 2–2 | L2 |
| 5 | October 8 | 7:07 p.m. EDT | @ Mariners | L 5–6 (11) | Johnson (2–0) | **McDowell** (0–2) | – | 4:19 | 57,411 | 2–3 | L3 |

Legend: = Win = Loss
Bold = Yankees team member

== Player stats ==
| = Indicates team leader |

=== Batting ===
==== Starters by position ====
Note: Pos = Position; G = Games played; AB = At bats; H = Hits; Avg. = Batting average; HR = Home runs; RBI = Runs batted in

| Pos | Player | G | AB | H | Avg. | HR | RBI |
|---|---|---|---|---|---|---|---|
| C | Mike Stanley | 118 | 399 | 107 | .268 | 18 | 83 |
| 1B | Don Mattingly | 128 | 458 | 132 | .288 | 7 | 49 |
| 2B | Pat Kelly | 89 | 270 | 64 | .237 | 4 | 29 |
| 3B | Wade Boggs | 126 | 460 | 149 | .324 | 5 | 63 |
| SS | Tony Fernández | 108 | 304 | 94 | .245 | 5 | 39 |
| LF | Luis Polonia | 67 | 238 | 62 | .261 | 2 | 15 |
| CF | Bernie Williams | 144 | 563 | 173 | .307 | 18 | 82 |
| RF | Paul O'Neill | 127 | 460 | 138 | .300 | 22 | 96 |
| DH | Rubén Sierra | 56 | 215 | 56 | .260 | 7 | 44 |

==== Other batters ====
Note: G = Games played; AB = At bats; H = Hits; Avg. = Batting average; HR = Home runs; RBI = Runs batted in

| Player | G | AB | H | Avg. | HR | RBI |
|---|---|---|---|---|---|---|
| Randy Velarde | 111 | 367 | 102 | .278 | 7 | 46 |
| Jim Leyritz | 77 | 264 | 71 | .269 | 7 | 37 |
| Dion James | 85 | 209 | 60 | .287 | 2 | 26 |
| Danny Tartabull | 59 | 192 | 43 | .224 | 6 | 28 |
| Gerald Williams | 100 | 182 | 45 | .247 | 6 | 28 |
| Russ Davis | 40 | 98 | 27 | .276 | 2 | 12 |
| Darryl Strawberry | 32 | 87 | 24 | .276 | 3 | 13 |
| Derek Jeter | 15 | 48 | 12 | .250 | 0 | 7 |
| Dave Silvestri | 17 | 21 | 2 | .095 | 1 | 4 |
| Kevin Elster | 10 | 17 | 2 | .118 | 0 | 0 |
| Robert Eenhoorn | 5 | 14 | 2 | .143 | 0 | 2 |
| Rubén Rivera | 5 | 1 | 0 | .000 | 0 | 0 |
| Jorge Posada | 1 | 0 | 0 | ---- | 0 | 0 |

=== Pitching ===
==== Starting pitchers ====
Note: GS = Games started; IP = Innings pitched; W = Wins; L = Losses; ERA = Earned run average; SO = Strikeouts

| Player | GS | IP | W | L | ERA | SO |
|---|---|---|---|---|---|---|
| Jack McDowell | 30 | 217.2 | 15 | 10 | 3.93 | 157 |
| Andy Pettitte | 26 | 175.0 | 12 | 9 | 4.17 | 114 |
| Sterling Hitchcock | 27 | 168.1 | 11 | 10 | 4.70 | 121 |
| David Cone | 13 | 99.0 | 9 | 2 | 3.82 | 89 |
| Scott Kamieniecki | 16 | 89.2 | 7 | 6 | 4.01 | 43 |
| Mélido Pérez | 12 | 69.1 | 5 | 5 | 5.58 | 44 |
| Jimmy Key | 5 | 30.1 | 1 | 2 | 5.64 | 14 |

==== Other pitchers ====
Note: G = Games pitched; IP = Innings pitched; W = Wins; L = Losses; ERA = Earned run average; SO = Strikeouts

| Player | G | IP | W | L | ERA | SO |
|---|---|---|---|---|---|---|
| Mariano Rivera | 19 | 67.0 | 5 | 3 | 5.51 | 51 |
| Brian Boehringer | 7 | 17.2 | 0 | 3 | 13.75 | 10 |
| Dave Eiland | 4 | 10.0 | 1 | 1 | 6.30 | 6 |

==== Relief pitchers ====
Note: G = Games pitched; W = Wins: L = Losses; SV = Saves; ERA = Earned run average; SO = Strikeouts

| Player | G | W | L | SV | ERA | SO |
|---|---|---|---|---|---|---|
| John Wetteland | 60 | 1 | 5 | 31 | 2.93 | 66 |
| Bob Wickman | 63 | 2 | 4 | 1 | 4.05 | 51 |
| Steve Howe | 56 | 6 | 3 | 2 | 4.96 | 28 |
| Bob MacDonald | 33 | 1 | 1 | 0 | 4.86 | 41 |
| Joe Ausanio | 28 | 2 | 0 | 1 | 5.73 | 36 |
| Scott Bankhead | 20 | 1 | 1 | 0 | 6.00 | 20 |
| Josías Manzanillo | 11 | 0 | 0 | 0 | 2.08 | 11 |
| Dave Pavlas | 4 | 0 | 0 | 0 | 3.18 | 3 |
| Jeff Patterson | 3 | 0 | 0 | 0 | 2.70 | 3 |
| Rick Honeycutt | 3 | 0 | 0 | 0 | 27.00 | 0 |

== ALDS ==
| Game | Score | Date |
|---|---|---|
| 1 | Seattle 6, New York 9 | Oct 3, 1995 |
| 2 | Seattle 5, New York 7 | Oct 4, 1995 |
| 3 | New York 4, Seattle 7 | Oct 6, 1995 |
| 4 | New York 8, Seattle 11 | Oct 7, 1995 |
| 5 | New York 5, Seattle 6 | Oct 8, 1995 |

== Farm system ==
| Level | Team | League | Manager |
|---|---|---|---|
| AAA | Columbus Clippers | International League | Bill Evers |
| AA | Norwich Navigators | Eastern League | Jimmy Johnson |
| A | Tampa Yankees | Florida State League | Jake Gibbs |
| A | Greensboro Bats | South Atlantic League | Trey Hillman |
| A-Short Season | Oneonta Yankees | New York–Penn League | Rob Thomson |
| Rookie | GCL Yankees | Gulf Coast League | Héctor López |
