= 1995 American League Division Series =

Teams
Team (Wins)		Manager	Season
Seattle Mariners (3)		Lou Piniella	79–66 (.545), GA: 1
New York Yankees (2)		Buck Showalter	79–65 (.549), GB: 7
- Dates: October 3–8
- Television: NBC (Games 1–2); ABC (Games 3–5)
- TV announcers: Gary Thorne and Tommy Hutton (Games 1–2); Brent Musburger and Jim Kaat (Games 3–5)
- Radio: CBS
- Radio announcers: Ernie Harwell and Al Downing
- Umpires: Games 1–2: Mike Reilly, Dale Scott, Jim McKean, Larry McCoy, Rich Garcia, Jim Joyce; Games 3–5: Tim Welke, John Hirschbeck, Joe Brinkman, Rocky Roe, Dan Morrison, Jim Evans

Teams
Team (Wins)		Manager	Season
Cleveland Indians (3)		Mike Hargrove	100–44 (.694), GA: 30
Boston Red Sox (0)		Kevin Kennedy	86–58 (.597), GA: 7
- Dates: October 3–6
- Television: NBC (Games 1–2); ABC (Game 3)
- TV announcers: Bob Costas and Bob Uecker (Games 1–2); Steve Zabriskie and Tommy Hutton (Game 3)
- Radio: CBS
- Radio announcers: John Rooney and Jeff Torborg
- Umpires: Games 1–2: Tim Welke, John Hirschbeck, Joe Brinkman, Rocky Roe, Dan Morrison, Don Denkinger; Game 3: Mike Reilly, Dale Scott, Jim McKean, Larry McCoy, Rich Garcia, Jim Joyce

The 1995 American League Division Series (ALDS), consisted of two best-of-five playoff series on the American League side in Major League Baseball’s (MLB) 1995 postseason, began on Tuesday, October 3, and ended on Sunday, October 8, with the champions of the three AL divisions—along with a "wild card" team—participating in two series. This was the first ALDS held in the postseason since 1981. As a result of both leagues realigning into three divisions in 1994, it marked the first time in major league history that a team could qualify for postseason play without finishing in first place in its league or division.

Under MLB's playoff format from 1995 to 1997, home field advantage was assigned to two of the three division champions on a rotating basis, regardless of record. The wild card team was then matched up against whichever of those two home-field division champions held the better record, unless it created an intradivisional matchup, as no two teams from the same division could be matched up in the Division Series, regardless of whether the format at the time would suggest such a matchup. Home field priority for division champions for the 1995 AL postseason was as follows: (1) West, (2) East, (3) Central. The matchups were:

- (1) Seattle Mariners (AL West champions) vs. (4) New York Yankees (Wild Card qualifier): Mariners won the series, 3–2.
- (2) Boston Red Sox (AL East champions) vs. (3) Cleveland Indians (AL Central champions): Indians won the series, 3–0.

The format of the Division Series was the same as the League Championship Series prior to 1985, a five-game set wherein the first two games were played at one stadium and the last three at the other. This format was later changed in 1998 for the present 2–2–1 format, which has been used in the Division Series since except for 2012, when the 2–3 format was used again due to the addition of the Wild Card Game. Because of realignment, this was the first time that both the Yankees and the Red Sox reached the playoffs in the same year.

The Mariners and Indians went on to meet in the AL Championship Series (ALCS). The Indians became the American League champion and lost to the National League champion Atlanta Braves in the 1995 World Series.

== Matchups ==
=== Seattle Mariners vs. New York Yankees ===
Seattle won the series, 3–2.

Game	Date	Score	Location	Time	Attendance
1	October 3	Seattle Mariners – 6, New York Yankees – 9	Yankee Stadium (I)	3:38	57,178
2	October 4	Seattle Mariners – 5, New York Yankees – 7 (15)	Yankee Stadium (I)	5:12	57,126
3	October 6	New York Yankees – 4, Seattle Mariners – 7	Kingdome	3:04	57,944
4	October 7	New York Yankees – 8, Seattle Mariners – 11	Kingdome	4:08	57,180
5	October 8	New York Yankees – 5, Seattle Mariners – 6 (11)	Kingdome	4:19	57,411

=== Boston Red Sox vs. Cleveland Indians ===
Cleveland won the series, 3–0.

Game	Date	Score	Location	Time	Attendance
1	October 3	Boston Red Sox – 4, Cleveland Indians – 5 (13)	Jacobs Field	5:01	44,218
2	October 4	Boston Red Sox – 0, Cleveland Indians – 4	Jacobs Field	2:33	44,264
3	October 6	Cleveland Indians – 8, Boston Red Sox – 2	Fenway Park	3:18	34,211

== Seattle vs. New York ==
Both teams finished the strike-shortened 1995 season with 79 wins. The Seattle Mariners were making their postseason debut on the strength of an amazing divisional comeback. The New York Yankees made it to the postseason for the first time since losing in the 1981 World Series, and the only time with Don Mattingly on their roster, as the AL Wild Card. The series featured at least ten runs per game and two extra-inning games. Ken Griffey Jr. was the star, hitting five home runs. The total number of home runs from both teams at the end of the series was 22, a record for a postseason series despite only having five games.

Griffey also was one of two key participants in one of the most iconic moments ever for Mariners fans, DH Edgar Martínez's two-run double in the bottom of the 11th inning of Game 5, on which Griffey scored the winning run from first base. The result of the series, and what became known as "The Double", is considered a redemptive moment for long-suffering Mariners fans, and often credited with ensuring that Major League Baseball remained in Seattle.

Seattle's win marked the fourth time in history that an expansion team won its first postseason series, after the New York Mets in their first championship season, in 1969, Montreal in 1981, and San Diego in 1984. Florida in their first championship season, 1997 and Tampa Bay in 2008 have since accomplished it.

Even though the Yankees made it to the post-season for the first time since 1981, they were still reeling from having the best record in the American League taken away from them by the strike. Yankees Manager Buck Showalter sat in "admitted misery" throughout that fall, as he "ached for Mattingly, the one player he believed deserved a postseason more than anyone else in the game." Mattingly had led active players in both games played and at bats without ever appearing in the postseason then.

=== Game 1 ===
October 3, 1995 8:10 pm (EDT) at Yankee Stadium (I) in Bronx, New York 75 °F (24 °C), clear
Team	1	2	3	4	5	6	7	8	9	R	H	E
Seattle	0	0	0	1	0	1	2	0	2	6	9	0
New York	0	0	2	0	0	2	4	1	X	9	13	0
WP: David Cone (1–0) LP: Jeff Nelson (0–1); Home runs: SEA: Ken Griffey Jr. 2 (2); NYY: Wade Boggs (1), Rubén Sierra (1); Attendance: 57,178; Boxscore

Don Mattingly finally made it to the postseason in what would be his final games. Chris Bosio faced David Cone in Game 1. In the third, Wade Boggs hit a home run with Randy Velarde on first to make it 2–0 Yankees, but Ken Griffey Jr. led the top of the fourth off with a home run of his own to cut the lead in half. Then in the sixth, the Mariners managed to load the bases against Cone. Facing Dan Wilson with the count 1–2, Wilson appeared to commit to Cone's next offering. However, on appeal, first base umpire Dale Scott signaled "no swing", continuing the inning and drawing the ire of Yankees fans, in particular Yankees owner George Steinbrenner, who went on to say MLB should not allow rookies to umpire in the postseason, despite the fact that Scott had umpired in the postseason since 1986. Still alive, Wilson was walked, tying the game at two, but in the bottom of the inning, Bernie Williams hit a leadoff single, moved to second on a groundout and scored on Mattingly's RBI single to put the Yankees back in front 3–2. After a Dion James single, Jeff Nelson relieved Bosio and allowed an RBI single to Mike Stanley that made it 4–2 Yankees. After Joey Cora walked, Griffey's second home run of the game tied the score again in the seventh. In the bottom of the inning, Nelson hit Randy Verlade with a pitch to lead off. Bobby Ayala in relief allowed a single to Wade Boggs and RBI double to Williams. After Paul O'Neill's sacrifice fly made it 6–4 Yankees, a two-run home run by Rubén Sierra extended the lead to 8–4. Next inning, the Yankees added another run off Bob Wells when Boggs doubled with two outs and scored on Williams's single. In the top of the ninth, after a leadoff walk and one-out, back-to-back RBI singles by Edgar Martinez and future Yankee Tino Martinez cut New York's lead to 9–6 and put the tying run to the plate for the Mariners, but John Wetteland retired the next two batters to end the game.

=== Game 2 ===
October 4, 1995 8:10 pm (EDT) at Yankee Stadium (I) in Bronx, New York 72 °F (22 °C), showers
Team	1	2	3	4	5	6	7	8	9	10	11	12	13	14	15	R	H	E
Seattle	0	0	1	0	0	1	2	0	0	0	0	1	0	0	0	5	16	2
New York	0	0	0	0	1	2	1	0	0	0	0	1	0	0	2	7	11	0
WP: Mariano Rivera (1–0) LP: Tim Belcher (0–1); Home runs: SEA: Vince Coleman (1), Ken Griffey Jr. (3); NYY: Rubén Sierra (2), Don Mattingly (1), Paul O'Neill (1), Jim Leyritz (1); Attendance: 57,126; Boxscore

In what was, at the time, the longest playoff game in terms of elapsed time, both teams battled back and forth. Andy Benes and Andy Pettitte started this classic playoff game. On the strength of a Vince Coleman home run, the Mariners jumped out in front in the third. With the game moving quickly, the Yankees responded with a Bernie Williams RBI double after Wade Boggs walked with two outs that tied the game in the fifth. Later, the Mariners would take their second lead of the night when Tino Martinez singled home Edgar Martínez, who doubled to lead off, in the top of the sixth. However, Benes allowed back-to-back homers to Rubén Sierra and Don Mattingly in the bottom half to end his night and put the Yankees up 3–2. However, the Mariners would reclaim the lead for the third time with a one-out double, subsequent single, RBI single by Luis Sojo, and sacrifice fly by Ken Griffey Jr. in the seventh, but Paul O'Neill's home run off Norm Charlton tied the game in the bottom half of the seventh. The game moved to extra innings and in the 12th the Mariners recaptured the lead once more with a home run by Griffey off John Wetteland, but, in the bottom of the inning, with two men on via two walks and two outs off Tim Belcher, Rubén Sierra hit a double that just missed being a game-winning home run by a couple of feet, scoring Jorge Posada with the tying run, but Williams was thrown out at the plate, ending the inning and forcing a 13th inning. Finally, in the bottom of the 15th, Jim Leyritz ended the game with a two-run home run after a walk off Belcher.

The game, which began at 8:10 P.M. Wednesday night, ended at 1:22 A.M. Thursday morning.

=== Game 3 ===
October 6, 1995 5:09 pm (PDT) at Kingdome in Seattle, Washington 68 °F (20 °C), dome
Team	1	2	3	4	5	6	7	8	9	R	H	E
New York	0	0	0	1	0	0	1	2	0	4	6	2
Seattle	0	0	0	0	2	4	1	0	X	7	7	0
WP: Randy Johnson (1–0) LP: Jack McDowell (0–1) Sv: Norm Charlton (1); Home runs: NYY: Bernie Williams 2 (2), Mike Stanley (1); SEA: Tino Martinez (1); Attendance: 57,944; Boxscore

It was the first ever Major League Baseball postseason game in Seattle and both teams pitched their best for Game 3. Jack McDowell faced Cy Young Award winner Randy Johnson. Johnson allowed a Bernie Williams home run to make it 1–0 Yankees in the fourth, but Tino Martinez's two-run home run after a walk made it 2–1 Mariners in the fifth. In the sixth, McDowell allowed a triple and two walks to load the bases for the Mariners with one out and they built a commanding five-run lead off a weakened Yankees bullpen. Martinez hit an RBI single off Steve Howe, then Bob Wickman allowed RBI singles to Jay Buhner and Mike Blowers before Luis Sojo's sacrifice fly made it 6–1 Mariners. The Yankees got a run in the seventh on Pat Kelly's sacrifice fly with two on, but the Mariners got that run back in the bottom half on Martinez's bases-loaded sacrifice fly off Sterling Hitchcock aided by Randy Velarde's error. Back-to-back home runs by Bernie Williams and Mike Stanley leading off the eighth off Bill Risley cut the Mariners' lead to 7–4, but Norm Charlton shut the door on Game 3, allowing the Mariners to win their first postseason game.

=== Game 4 ===
October 7, 1995 4:08 pm (PDT) at Kingdome in Seattle, Washington 68 °F (20 °C), dome
Team	1	2	3	4	5	6	7	8	9	R	H	E
New York	3	0	2	0	0	0	0	1	2	8	14	1
Seattle	0	0	4	0	1	1	0	5	X	11	16	0
WP: Norm Charlton (1–0) LP: John Wetteland (0–1) Sv: Bill Risley (1); Home runs: NYY: Paul O'Neill (2); SEA: Edgar Martínez 2 (2), Ken Griffey Jr. (4), Jay Buhner (1); Attendance: 57,180; Boxscore

Scott Kamieniecki faced Chris Bosio in Game 4. The Yankees came out swinging in the first, loading the bases with no outs on a double, single and walk before Ruben Sierra's sacrifice fly and a two-run single by Don Mattingly put them up 3–0. In the third, the Yanks got two more on Paul O'Neill's two-run home run after a walk. Bosio was finished, pitching only two-plus innings. The Yankees were poised to take the series, but the Mariners rallied again. In the bottom of the third, Edgar Martínez's three-run home run after back-to-back leadoff singles energized the crowd and cut the Yankees' lead to 5–3. Later in the inning, after a single, walk, and sacrifice bunt, Luis Sojo's sacrifice fly made it a one-run game. In the fifth, Mattingly's error on Dan Wilson's groundball with two on allowed the Mariners to tie the game and complete a five-run comeback. Then in the sixth, with Sterling Hitchcock pitching, Ken Griffey Jr.'s home run gave the Mariners a 6–5 edge. In the eighth, Norm Charlton's wild pitch with runners on first and third allowed the Yankees to tie the game at six, the run charged to Tim Belcher. John Wetteland was called on to keep the game tied for the Yankees, but he loaded the bases with nobody out on a walk, single and hit-by-pitch for Edgar Martínez, who hit a grand slam, giving him seven RBIs in the game and the Mariners a 10–6 lead. Then Jay Buhner's home run off Steve Howe put the Mariners on top 11–6. In the ninth, Mattingly singled to lead off the ninth off Charlton, who was relieved by Bobby Ayala. Mattingly moved on a groundout and scored on Mike Stanley's single. After a single and walk loaded the bases, Wade Boggs's groundout off Bill Risley made it 11–8 Mariners and brought up Bernie Williams as the tying run, but Risley got Williams to fly out to center to earn the save and set up Game 5.

=== Game 5 ===
October 8, 1995 4:09 pm (PDT) at Kingdome in Seattle, Washington 68 °F (20 °C), dome
Team	1	2	3	4	5	6	7	8	9	10	11	R	H	E
New York	0	0	0	2	0	2	0	0	0	0	1	5	6	0
Seattle	0	0	1	1	0	0	0	2	0	0	2	6	15	0
WP: Randy Johnson (2–0) LP: Jack McDowell (0–2); Home runs: NYY: Paul O'Neill (3); SEA: Joey Cora (1), Ken Griffey Jr. (5); Attendance: 57,411; Boxscore

Andy Benes and David Cone were sent to the mound for the Mariners and Yankees respectively to determine the winner of the series. Joey Cora hit a home run to make it 1–0 Mariners in the bottom of the third. Paul O'Neill hit a two-run home run after a walk to make it 2–1 Yankees in the top of the fourth. Jay Buhner's broken-bat RBI single after a Tino Martinez double and wild pitch tied the game in the bottom half.

In the sixth, Benes struck out Wade Boggs looking, then walked three to load the bases; Don Mattingly sliced a two-run ground-rule double to left that put the Yankees in front 4–2. After an intentional walk to reload the bases, the next two batters went to full counts, then popped up to end the inning. Benes threw 40 pitches that inning to bring his total to an even hundred. In the bottom half, Edgar Martínez led off with a double down the third base line, then Cone struck out the next three.

In the seventh, Randy Velarde was caught looking on a full count, and Boggs hit a weak grounder to first. Bernie Williams walked and Benes was relieved by southpaw Norm Charlton, who caused O'Neill to fly out to left. Cone struck out two more, then Coleman lined out to Mattingly at first. In the top of the eighth, Charlton issued a walk with two outs, then got a ground ball to end the inning. In the bottom half, with five outs to go and Cone still pitching, Ken Griffey Jr. homered deep to right to make it a one-run game. With two outs and the bases empty, the Mariners loaded them with a walk, single (Buhner), and another walk. On a full count, Cone threw his 147th (and final) pitch in the dirt to pinch hitter Doug Strange to tie the game at four. Rookie Mariano Rivera ended the inning with three straight strikes to Mike Blowers.

Both teams blew chances in the ninth with two men on to score the potential series-winning run. Tony Fernández led off with a double off Charlton, followed by a walk to Randy Velarde, who had failed to bunt. Charlton was relieved by Randy Johnson, who retired the side with eight pitches. (Boggs struggled to bunt and struck out on three pitches. On a 2–0 count, Bernie Williams lifted an infield fly, and after a called strike, O'Neill popped out behind home plate to end the threat.) Vince Coleman ripped an 0–2 pitch from Rivera to center for a single, Cora sacrificed him to second, then Griffey was intentionally walked. Jack McDowell entered and struck out Edgar Martínez, and Alex Rodriguez bounced a fielder's choice to shortstop to send the game to the tenth inning.

Starters McDowell and Johnson made rare relief appearances; both entered in the ninth with runners on, then continued into extra innings. In the tenth, Johnson struck out the side (Rubén Sierra, Mattingly, and Gerald Williams). Buhner led off and lined another single to left field, but reserve catcher Chris Widger bunted foul on a 1–2 count for the first out. Strange grounded to second with a fielder's choice, then Blowers bounced the first pitch deep in the hole for an infield hit. Coleman grounded a fielder's choice to first baseman Mattingly for the third out.

In the top of the 11th, Johnson opened with a four-pitch walk to catcher Mike Stanley, and Fernández bunted to move pinch runner Pat Kelly to second. With a 1–0 count, Johnson nemesis Velarde singled through the hole to left to score Kelly and put the Yankees up by one, just three outs away from the next round. New catcher Jim Leyritz was called out on strikes, Bernie Williams was intentionally walked, and O'Neill fouled off several before he was caught looking.

Cora led off the bottom half: taking three pitches to a 2–1 count, he dragged a bunt down the first base line and avoided a Mattingly tag. After McDowell's first pitch just missed low and away, Griffey ripped a high strike up the middle to put runners on first and third. With no outs, Edgar Martínez watched a strike, then lined a double to the left field fence, scoring both Cora and Griffey to send the Mariners to the League Championship Series. Martinez's game-winning hit and the aftermath remains the Mariners' most famous moment.

==== Aftermath ====
Until 2011, this was the only LDS Game 5 to extend to extra innings.

During 1995, there were rumors the Mariners might relocate to the Tampa area. Their success this season led to renewed local interest in the team and the building of Safeco Field, which opened in July 1999.

The Yankees replaced manager Buck Showalter with Joe Torre and won the World Series in 1996, 1998, 1999, and 2000.

=== Composite box ===
1995 ALDS (3–2): Seattle Mariners over New York Yankees

Team	1	2	3	4	5	6	7	8	9	10	11	12	13	14	15	R	H	E
Seattle Mariners	0	0	6	2	3	7	5	7	2	0	2	1	0	0	0	35	63	2
New York Yankees	3	0	4	3	1	6	6	4	2	0	1	1	0	0	2	33	50	3
Total attendance: 286,839 Average attendance: 57,368

=== In popular culture ===
The song "My Oh My" by Seattle-based rapper Macklemore in conjunction with his partner Ryan Lewis, features a call of Game 5 by the late Dave Niehaus, simply known as The Double. It is written to honor the memory of Niehaus, who died in 2010.

== Boston vs. Cleveland ==
=== Game 1 ===
October 3, 1995 8:44 pm (EDT) at Jacobs Field in Cleveland, Ohio 61 °F (16 °C), rain
Team	1	2	3	4	5	6	7	8	9	10	11	12	13	R	H	E
Boston	0	0	2	0	0	0	0	1	0	0	1	0	0	4	11	2
Cleveland	0	0	0	0	0	3	0	0	0	0	1	0	1	5	10	2
WP: Ken Hill (1–0) LP: Zane Smith (0–1); Home runs: BOS: John Valentin (1), Luis Alicea (1), Tim Naehring (1); CLE: Albert Belle (1), Tony Peña (1); Attendance: 44,218; Boxscore

After a 39-minute rain delay, Game 1 got underway with two veterans, Roger Clemens and Dennis Martínez, starting the opener. Playing in its first playoff game since Game 4 of the 1954 World Series, the Indians trailed early as the Red Sox jumped in front first in the third when Dwayne Hosey walked and John Valentin hit a two-run home run. The Indians, however, rallied against Clemens in the sixth with two two-out singles followed by a two-run double by Albert Belle that tied the game and a single by Eddie Murray that scored Belle. But Luis Alicea's eighth inning home run off Julián Tavárez sent the game into extra innings. Tim Naehring would give the Red Sox the lead in the 11th with a home run off Jim Poole, but Belle's leadoff home run off Red Sox closer Rick Aguilera tied the game in the bottom half. The Indians would put the winning run in scoring position later in the inning but failed to come through. In the bottom of the 13th, 15-year veteran Tony Peña hit the game winning homer with two outs. It was the Indians' first postseason win since the clinching Game 6 in the 1948 World Series.

=== Game 2 ===
October 4, 1995 8:08 pm (EDT) at Jacobs Field in Cleveland, Ohio 62 °F (17 °C), clear
Team	1	2	3	4	5	6	7	8	9	R	H	E
Boston	0	0	0	0	0	0	0	0	0	0	3	1
Cleveland	0	0	0	0	2	0	0	2	X	4	4	2
WP: Orel Hershiser (1–0) LP: Erik Hanson (0–1); Home runs: BOS: None; CLE: Eddie Murray (1); Attendance: 44,264; Boxscore

Game 2 featured an unlikely matchup between Erik Hanson and Orel Hershiser. Both pitchers were on even turns until the Indians broke through in the fifth with Omar Vizquel's two-run double after two walks. It remained 2–0 until the eighth when the Indians put the game away on Eddie Murray's two-run home run after a walk. That gave the Indian bullpen a comfortable 4–0 lead in the ninth. Hanson pitched a complete game in a losing effort. Hershiser struck out seven and allowed only three hits in 7 1/3 innings.

=== Game 3 ===
October 6, 1995 8:08 pm (EDT) at Fenway Park in Boston, Massachusetts 56 °F (13 °C), clear
Team	1	2	3	4	5	6	7	8	9	R	H	E
Cleveland	0	2	1	0	0	5	0	0	0	8	11	2
Boston	0	0	0	1	0	0	0	1	0	2	7	1
WP: Charles Nagy (1–0) LP: Tim Wakefield (0–1); Home runs: CLE: Jim Thome (1); BOS: None; Attendance: 34,211; Boxscore

Charles Nagy faced Tim Wakefield in the potential clincher. In the top of the second, with a man on first, Jim Thome gave the Indians the lead with a two-run home run just inside the Pesky Pole. Thome later drew a bases-loaded walk in the third to make it 3–0. In the fourth, the Red Sox loaded the bases on three singles with one out, but scored only one run on Mike Macfarlane's sacrifice fly. The Indians blew the game open in the sixth. After a single and walk, Paul Sorrento's single and Sandy Alomar's double scored a run each and knocked Wakefield out of the game. Rhéal Cormier in relief struck out Kenny Lofton, but Omar Vizquel's singled scored two and Carlos Baerga's double scored another. In the eighth, the Red Sox again loaded the bases on three one-out singles, but again only scored once on Willie McGee's fielder's choice off Julián Tavárez. Paul Assenmacher would pitch a scoreless ninth to end the series. The loss was the Red Sox's 13th consecutive postseason loss dating back to Game 6 of the 1986 World Series.

=== Composite box ===
1995 ALDS (3–0): Cleveland Indians over Boston Red Sox

Team	1	2	3	4	5	6	7	8	9	10	11	12	13	R	H	E
Cleveland Indians	0	2	1	0	2	8	0	2	0	0	1	0	1	17	25	6
Boston Red Sox	0	0	2	1	0	0	0	2	0	0	1	0	0	6	21	4
Total attendance: 122,693 Average attendance: 40,898
