= Jeff Pierce (baseball) =

American baseball player (born 1969)

- Pitcher
- Born: June 7, 1969 (age 55); Poughkeepsie, New York, U.S.
- Batted: Right Threw: Right

MLB debut
- April 26, 1995, for the Boston Red Sox

Last MLB appearance
- May 24, 1995, for the Boston Red Sox

MLB statistics
- Win–loss record: 0–3
- Earned run average: 6.60
- Strikeouts: 12

CPBL statistics
- Win–loss record: 1–0
- Earned run average: 6.60
- Strikeouts: 9
- Stats at Baseball Reference

Teams
- Boston Red Sox (1995); Mercuries Tigers (1997)

Jeffrey Charles Pierce (born June 7, 1969) is an American former middle relief pitcher in Major League Baseball who played briefly for the Boston Red Sox during the 1995 season. Listed at 6 ft 1 in (1.85 m), 190 pounds (86 kg), he batted and threw right-handed.

== Early life and amateur career ==
Pierce was born in Poughkeepsie, New York, where his father, Don, was an engineer for IBM. Pierce grew up a fan of the New York Yankees and attended games at Yankee Stadium.

He played high school baseball for Franklin Delano Roosevelt High School in Hyde Park, New York, where he was teammates with Frank Cimorelli. In 1987, he had a batting average of .438.

Pierce did not receive any college baseball scholarship offers and was not drafted out of high school. Unable to afford college without a scholarship, he joined the United States Army Reserve. After completing Basic Training and spending the summer with the Army, he enrolled at Dutchess Community College in his native Dutchess County.

At Dutchess, he was talked into joining the baseball team where he was again teammates with Frank Cimorelli. In 1989, he was the National Junior College Athletic Association Region XV Player of the Year.

He continued his college baseball career for the NC State Wolfpack from 1990–1991. In 1990, he was named to the All-Atlantic Coast Conference (ACC) Second Team; he had a batting average of .359 with 13 home runs and had a 6–1 record as a pitcher.

Given Pierce's dual role as an outfielder and pitcher, coach Ray Tanner would sometimes toss a ball to Pierce in the outfield during mound visits so that he and teammate Brian Bark could use the time to warm each other up. During a game in May of his senior year in 1991, Pierce tied an ACC record by hitting four home runs and driving in ten runs. He was again named to the All-ACC Second Team as an outfielder in 1991. He was named to the ACC baseball tournament's All-Tournament Team as an outfielder in 1990 and 1991. In 67 games as a senior, he hit 19 home runs, drove in 77 runs and maintained a batting average of .370.

== Professional career ==
=== Chicago White Sox ===
After not being selected in the 1991 Major League Baseball draft, Pierce signed as a free agent with the Chicago White Sox on June 10, 1991. Though he primarily played the outfield at NC State, he was signed as a pitcher; Alex Cosmidis, the scout who signed Pierce, had seen him pitch a game in the 1991 ACC Baseball Tournament. However, he talked the White Sox into letting him take batting practice after signing and performed well enough that he was assigned to the Utica Blue Sox as an outfielder to start his professional baseball career.

Pierce spent the entire 1991 season as an outfielder in Utica where he finished fourth on the team in slugging percentage. Nonetheless, Pierce spent the 1991–92 offseason training as a pitcher in anticipation of being transferred to the pitching mound.

Pierce made his professional pitching debut in 1992 with the South Bend White Sox. At midseason, he was named a Midwest League All-Star. He finished the season with the second-most saves in the league.

Pierce began the 1993 season in Double-A with the Birmingham Barons. Despite missing two weeks in the summer due to a rib cage injury, he was third in the Southern League in saves by the end of July.

=== Cincinnati Reds ===
On July 31, 1993, he was traded along with Johnny Ruffin to the Cincinnati Reds in exchange for Tim Belcher. The Reds kept him in the Southern League with the Chattanooga Lookouts where he served primarily as a setup man for closer Chris Bushing, a transition he told the Birmingham Post-Herald he found "pretty frustrating."

Prior to the 1994 season, in the words of The Cincinnati Enquirer, Pierce was among a group of "young, no-name pitchers" invited to Major League spring training by the Reds. The Reds also thought highly enough of him to add him to their 40-man roster. However, in March, the team placed Pierce on waivers at least in part to create room on the roster for Tony Fernández. The Boston Red Sox signed him on March 18 to fill a spot on the 40-man roster created by their release of Scott Taylor. The next day, Pierce said he was "glad to be out of the Reds organization" because he "wasn't too happy" there. Peter Gammons later reported in The Boston Globe that Pierce had "had some problems with teammates" in the organization.

=== Boston Red Sox ===
At the conclusion of spring training, Pierce was assigned to the Double-A New Britain Red Sox to start the 1994 season. Despite pitching only a portion of the season in New Britain, Pierce led the team with ten saves, more than triple the second place finisher. On June 18, Pierce was called up to Triple-A for the first time in his career with the Pawtucket Red Sox; he became the 37th player rostered by Pawtucket in the 1994 season. Despite joining the PawSox mid-season, he finished the year with the fourth-most pitching appearances on the team. He had been expecting to receive a September call-up to the majors before the Major League Baseball Players' Association went on strike.

The Red Sox had high hopes for Pierce heading into the 1995 season. General Manager Dan Duquette told the press that he expected Pierce to have a middle relief role in the majors in 1995. He spent part of the offseason honing his craft in the Liga de Béisbol Profesional de Puerto Rico.

Pierce was named to Boston's Opening Day roster to start the 1995 season. He made his Major League debut on Opening Day, April 26, 1995; Pierce contributed to a two-hit shutout of the Minnesota Twins, pitching a scoreless eighth inning in the game at Fenway Park. Through his first ten appearances between April 26 and May 20, Pierce managed an ERA of 2.57, more than two runs better than the league average. However, in his next two games, he allowed ten of thirteen batters to reach base and surrendered seven earned runs in only one inning pitched. Around this time, Dan Shaughnessy wrote in The Boston Globe of the struggling Red Sox bullpen, "On your scorecard they are known as Ken Ryan, Tim VanEgmond [sic], Jeff Pierce, Stan Belinda, Alejandro Pena and Derek Lilliquist, but their real names are famine, pestilence, death, destruction, Steve Crawford and Wes Gardner." Nick Cafardo reported that Red Sox manager Kevin Kennedy was "particularly peeved" about Pierce's outing on May 24 against the Seattle Mariners in which Pierce allowed a three-run double to Mike Blowers. After the game, Kennedy publicly criticized Pierce's performance, telling reporters that his "grandmother could have hit that" pitch. Although Pierce responded by saying that he "just went out and gave it 100 percent," he would not get another chance to pitch in the majors. The May 24 game would be the final appearance of his Major League career. A few days later, he and Ron Mahay were demoted to the minors to make room on the roster for Tim Wakefield, Tuffy Rhodes and Steve Rodriguez.

Following the 1995 season, Pierce was designated for assignment and removed from Boston's 40-man roster in order to make room for Brent Cookson. During the offseason, he underwent surgery on bone spurs in his elbow which caused him to miss a large part of the beginning of the 1996 season. After the delayed start, he began his season at the bottom of the minor league ladder in the Gulf Coast League and worked his way back up to Triple-A Pawtucket by the end of July. Because of his surgery, his 51.1 innings pitched were a career-low since he began pitching in 1992.

=== Mercuries Tigers ===
On April 4, 1997, the Red Sox released Pierce. After his release, Pierce chose to continue his career outside North America. He joined the Mercuries Tigers of the Chinese Professional Baseball League for two months at the start of the 1997 season. In only fifteen innings in Taiwan, Pierce allowed eleven earned runs, leaving him with the worst ERA on the team at the end of the season.

=== Chicago Cubs and retirement ===
On June 20, 1997, the Chicago Cubs signed Pierce and assigned him to the Double-A Orlando Rays to replace pitcher Lee Hancock. Pierce made his debut with the team on June 21 and allowed one run over four innings. He said afterward "I was very happy with the results... I just know I'm going to do better." However, the Cubs released Pierce less than a month later after having traded Frank Castillo to the Colorado Rockies for pitcher Matt Pool. Orlando Rays manager Dave Trembley said the organization decided to give his roster spot to Pool because he was the younger player. Pierce retired following his release.

Pierce told the Poughkeepsie Journal that he had no regrets about his career and would not be reconsidering retiring. He planned to finish his bachelor's degree, pursue a Master of Education, become a college baseball coach and live a "normal life."

== See also ==
- 1995 Boston Red Sox season
- Boston Red Sox all-time roster
