= Frank Rodriguez =

American baseball player (born 1972)

- Pitcher / Coach
- Born: December 11, 1972 (age 53); Brooklyn, New York, U.S.
- Batted: Right Threw: Right

MLB debut
- April 26, 1995, for the Boston Red Sox

Last MLB appearance
- July 22, 2001, for the Cincinnati Reds

MLB statistics
- Win–loss record: 29–39
- Earned run average: 5.53
- Strikeouts: 371
- Stats at Baseball Reference

Teams
- Boston Red Sox (1995); Minnesota Twins (1995–1998); Seattle Mariners (1999–2000); Cincinnati Reds (2001)

Career highlights and awards
- Dick Howser Trophy (1991)

Francisco Rodriguez (born December 11, 1972) is an American former professional baseball pitcher who played in Major League Baseball from 1995 to 2001.

== Amateur career ==
Rodriguez won the Dick Howser Trophy, the annual national award for the outstanding collegiate baseball player, for his 1991 season Howard Junior College in Big Spring, Texas. Since then, no junior college baseball player has won the award. Rodriguez played shortstop and pitcher for Howard, and he led his team to the 1991 JUCO World Series title. He won 14 games as a pitcher and hit 26 home runs.

== Professional career ==
Rodriguez was drafted as a shortstop by the Boston Red Sox in the second round of the 1990 MLB draft. He signed with Boston in Jun 1991 and began his professional career in 1991 with the Class A Short Season Elmira Pioneers. He converted to a pitcher in 1992 with the Class A Lynchburg Red Sox.

He made his major league debut for the Red Sox on Wednesday, April 26, 1995, pitching a scoreless inning. On July 26, he was traded to the Minnesota Twins for closer Rick Aguilera, with Minnesota later sending minor leaguer J. J. Johnson to complete the trade. Rodriguez led the Twins with 13 wins in 1996 and won the team's Joseph W. Haynes Award as pitcher of the year. However, he also had 14 losses and a 5.05 ERA.

The Seattle Mariners claimed Rodriguez off waivers from the Twins in May 1999, and he pitched for Seattle through the 2020 season. He was suspended in August 1999 for hitting Chuck Knoblauch of the New York Yankees and swearing at the Yankees dugout, in retaliation for Edgar Martínez being hit, spurring a bench-clearing brawl.

Rodriguez last pitched in the majors for the Cincinnati Reds in 2001. He struck out four Florida Marlins batters in one inning on July 22, with Ryan Thompson reaching on a wild pitch and later scoring in the inning. Rodriguez finished with an MLB career record of 29–39 and 5.53 ERA.

In 2008, he returned to pro baseball playing for the Newark Bears of the Atlantic League where he pitched to a 2–1 record, with 7.79 ERA.

== Coaching career ==
Rodriguez was an assistant coach for the SUNY Maritime College Privateers in the Bronx, New York from 2015 to 2021.

He became the pitching coach for the Mercy University Mavericks in 2022. After two seasons, he became an associate head coach.
