= Jeff Patterson =

American baseball player (born 1968)

- Pitcher
- Born: October 1, 1968 (age 57); Anaheim, California, U.S.
- Batted: Right Threw: Right

MLB debut
- April 30, 1995, for the New York Yankees

Last MLB appearance
- May 7, 1995, for the New York Yankees

MLB statistics
- Win–loss record: 0–0
- Earned run average: 2.70
- Strikeouts: 3
- Stats at Baseball Reference

Teams
- New York Yankees (1995)

Jeffrey Simmons Patterson (born October 1, 1968) is an American former Major League Baseball pitcher. Patterson was drafted by the Philadelphia Phillies in the 58th round of the 1988 draft. He pitched three career games in the major leagues, all with the New York Yankees in 1995. He allowed 3 hits in 3.1 innings pitched with an Earned run average of 2.70.

Patterson played college baseball at Cypress College. In 1989, he set a school record by striking out 129 batters in a single season. That record would stand until 1999.
