= Kevin Kennedy (baseball) =

American baseball analyst and manager

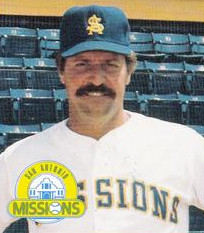
- Kennedy in 1988
- Manager
- Born: May 26, 1954 (age 72); Los Angeles, California, U.S.
- Bats: Right Throws: Right

MLB statistics
- Games managed: 582
- Managerial record: 309–273
- Winning percentage: .531
- Stats at Baseball Reference

Teams
- As coach: Montreal Expos (1992); As manager: Texas Rangers (1993–1994); Boston Red Sox (1995–1996)

Kevin Curtis Kennedy (born May 26, 1954) is an American former player, coach, and manager in professional baseball. Following an eight-season playing career in Minor League Baseball, he managed for 12 seasons in the minor leagues and four seasons in Major League Baseball (two seasons each with the Texas Rangers and Boston Red Sox). After his managerial career, Kennedy worked as a baseball commentator, including for ESPN, Fox Sports, the Tampa Bay Rays, and Los Angeles Dodgers.

== Early life and playing career ==
Born in Los Angeles, Kevin Kennedy graduated from Taft High School in Woodland Hills, California in 1972, where he was a classmate of Robin Yount.

He attended San Diego State University and was drafted by the Baltimore Orioles in the 8th round of the 1976 Major League Baseball draft.

Kennedy was a career minor league catcher who played in the Orioles, St. Louis Cardinals and Los Angeles Dodgers farm systems. In 510 career games, he hit .238 with 12 homers and 178 RBI. While with the Pawtucket Red Sox in 1981, he was the only player from either team to not play in the longest professional baseball game (33 innings) versus the Rochester Red Wings.

Kennedy retired from playing after the 1983 season.

== Managerial career ==
Kennedy became a manager in the Dodgers farm system for the Great Falls Dodgers (1984–1986), Bakersfield Dodgers (1987), San Antonio Missions (1988) and Albuquerque Dukes (1989–1991). He was subsequently the bench coach for the Montreal Expos during their 1992 season.

=== Texas Rangers ===
Kennedy was hired to manage the Texas Rangers for their 1993 season after the firing of Bobby Valentine and Toby Harrah. Kennedy was let go following the strike-shortened 1994 season after posting only a 52–62 record (even though, at the time of the strike, it was good enough for first place in the division) and was replaced by Johnny Oates.

=== Boston Red Sox ===
Kennedy became the manager of the Boston Red Sox for their 1995 season. He led them to their first postseason appearance since 1990, but they were swept by the Cleveland Indians in the Division Series. Kennedy was fired following the 1996 season after the team finished third in their division and missed the playoffs.

=== Managerial record ===
Team	Year	Regular season					Postseason			
Team	Year	Games	Won	Lost	Win %	Finish	Won	Lost	Win %	Result
TEX	1993	162	86	76	.531	2nd in AL West	–	–	–	–
TEX	1994	114	52	62	.456	1st in AL West	–	–	–	Season canceled
TEX total		276	138	138	.500		0	0	–	
BOS	1995	144	86	58	.597	1st in AL East	0	3	.000	Lost ALDS (CLE)
BOS	1996	162	85	77	.525	3rd in AL East	–	–	–	–
BOS total		306	171	135	.559		0	3	.000	
Total		582	309	273	.531		0	3	.000	

== Broadcasting career ==
In 1997 Kennedy joined ESPN as a color analyst on the network's Wednesday Night Baseball telecasts, performing the same role on ESPN Radio's Sunday Night Baseball in 1998 and on Fox Sports Net's Thursday Night Baseball in 1999 and 2000. From 2001 to 2008, he was a studio analyst for baseball on Fox, teaming with host Jeanne Zelasko. He also contributed to Fox Sports Net's Best Damn Sports Show Period and hosted a radio program on FOX Sports Radio, and was a regular co-host of Dodgers Live on Prime Ticket at this time. He was given the nickname "the Skipper" by Fox Sports due to his prior managerial career.

In 2009, Kennedy took a job as a part-time television analyst for the Tampa Bay Rays, sharing the duty with former Rays pitcher Brian Anderson. Kennedy and Anderson both replaced Joe Magrane. Kennedy returned to the Dodgers' postgame show for the 2009 postseason. In October 2010, it was announced that Kennedy would not be returning to the Rays' broadcast crew for the 2011 season.

Kevin co-hosted Power Alley with Jim Duquette on SiriusXM's MLB Network Radio in 2011. From 2014 through 2018, Kennedy teamed with Rick Monday to call select games on the Dodgers Radio Network and occasionally co-hosted the team's Dodger Talk radio post-game show.

=== Other media ===
In October 2019, Kennedy started doing podcasts of The Kevin Kennedy Show with Rich Grisham of Out of the Park Baseball and launched an official website where he teaches baseball instruction videos, has a blog, and hosts Q&A with fans.

Sporting positions
Preceded by ?	Great Falls Dodgers Manager; 1984–1986	Succeeded by Tim Johnson
Preceded by Don LeJohn	Bakersfield Dodgers Manager; 1987	Succeeded by Gary LaRocque
Preceded by ?	San Antonio Missions Manager; 1988	Succeeded by John Shoemaker
Preceded by Terry Collins	Albuquerque Dukes Manager; 1989–1991	Succeeded by Bill Russell
Preceded by Joe Magrane	Tampa Bay Rays television color announcer 2009–2010	Succeeded by Brian Anderson
