= Stan Belinda =

American baseball player (born 1966)

- Pitcher
- Born: August 6, 1966 (age 60); Huntingdon, Pennsylvania, U.S.
- Batted: Right Threw: Right

MLB debut
- September 8, 1989, for the Pittsburgh Pirates

Last MLB appearance
- September 3, 2000, for the Atlanta Braves

MLB statistics
- Win–loss record: 41–37
- Earned run average: 4.15
- Strikeouts: 622
- Saves: 79
- Stats at Baseball Reference

Teams
- Pittsburgh Pirates (1989–1993); Kansas City Royals (1993–1994); Boston Red Sox (1995–1996); Cincinnati Reds (1997–1999); Colorado Rockies (2000); Atlanta Braves (2000)

Stanley Peter Belinda (born August 6, 1966) is an American former Major League Baseball player. A right-handed relief pitcher who also batted right-handed, Belinda is 6 ft 3 in (1.91 m) tall and weighs 187 pounds. He pitched from a three-quarters arm slot (sometimes categorized as a "sidearm" delivery) and threw both a regular low-90s fastball and a split-fingered fastball.

== Baseball career ==
=== Pittsburgh Pirates ===
As an amateur, Belinda pitched at State College Area High School and Allegany College of Maryland. In 1986, the Pittsburgh Pirates selected him in the 10th round of the June draft, the 238th pick overall. He made his professional debut in the Gulf Coast League and advanced steadily through the minors, making his major league debut with the Pirates on September 8, 1989. From 1990–1992, Belinda was a key reliever for the Pirates, setting up for Bill Landrum in the first two years before being promoted to closer in 1992.

==== 1992 National League Championship Series ====
In Game 7 of the NLCS, Belinda came in the ninth inning, to protect a 2–0 Pittsburgh lead with three men on base and nobody out. Belinda got Ron Gant to sacrifice fly, then walked Damon Berryhill and retired Brian Hunter on a popup. Finally, with reserve Francisco Cabrera at the plate, Belinda surrendered a game-winning single, with Sid Bream beating the throw from left fielder Barry Bonds to score from second base.

=== Kansas City Royals and Boston Red Sox ===
Belinda was the subject of criticism in Pittsburgh after the loss, and on July 31, 1993, they traded Belinda to the Kansas City Royals for pitchers Jon Lieber and Dan Miceli. With the Royals, Belinda pulled off an immaculate inning, striking out the side on nine pitches. Arm problems plagued Belinda during his year and a half with the Royals, and he left the team as a free agent, signing with the Boston Red Sox for the 1995 season.

Healthy again, Belinda enjoyed a great 1995 season, winning 8 with 10 saves as the primary setup man for Rick Aguilera. Belinda's arm troubles resurfaced in 1996, and he was largely ineffective, walking more batters than he struck out and pitching only 28 1/3 innings.

=== Cincinnati Reds ===
Belinda signed with the Cincinnati Reds and went on to enjoy the best season of his career, pitching 99 1/3 innings. His 84 games pitched ranked second in the league, and his 114 strikeouts led all relief pitchers in baseball. He began to experience tingling and numbness in his legs the following season, and on September 22, 1998, the Mayo Clinic diagnosed multiple sclerosis.

=== Colorado Rockies and Atlanta Braves ===
Daily injections of the drug Copaxone and changes to his diet and lifestyle enabled Belinda to keep pitching professionally for a time, but his performance suffered. He spent 1999 as a mop-up pitcher for the Reds, and on October 30 of that year, he and outfielder Jeffrey Hammonds were traded to the Colorado Rockies for outfielder Dante Bichette. Belinda put up a 7.07 ERA with the Rockies in 2000, before being released in July. He signed with the Atlanta Braves but was released again on September 12, ending his professional career. He retired with 41 wins, 37 losses, and 79 saves, putting up a 4.15 ERA in 685 1/3 career innings.

=== Personal life ===
Belinda has multiple sclerosis. Belinda's son, Wyatt, played baseball at the college level. His nephew, Jacob Belinda, played college baseball at Lock Haven University and played in the Atlanta Braves organization.
