= Dwayne Hosey =

American baseball player (born 1967)

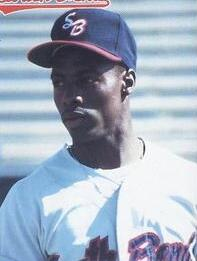
- Hosey with the South Bend White Sox c. 1988
- Outfielder
- Born: March 11, 1967 (age 59); Sharon, Pennsylvania, U.S.
- Batted: Switch Threw: Right

Professional debut
- MLB: September 1, 1995, for the Boston Red Sox
- NPB: April 4, 1997, for the Yakult Swallows

Last appearance
- MLB: June 20, 1996, for the Boston Red Sox
- NPB: October 4, 1998, for the Yakult Swallows

MLB statistics
- Batting average: .274
- Home runs: 4
- Runs batted in: 10

NPB statistics
- Batting average: .268
- Home runs: 51
- Runs batted in: 142
- Stats at Baseball Reference

Teams
- Boston Red Sox (1995–1996); Yakult Swallows (1997–1998)

Career highlights and awards
- NPB All-Star (1997); Central League home run leader (1997); Central League Best Nine Award (1997)

Dwayne Samuel Hosey (born March 11, 1967) is an American former professional outfielder for the Boston Red Sox of the Major League Baseball (MLB). He threw right-handed, and was a switch hitter.

== Career ==
Hosey was drafted by the Chicago White Sox in 1987 Major League Baseball draft, and spent most of his career in the minor league organizations of the Oakland Athletics, Milwaukee Brewers, Kansas City Royals, and Boston Red Sox. In 1994 he had his best minor league season, winning the American Association MVP. In 112 games hit .333 and slugging .628 with 27 home runs, 80 RBI, 27 stolen bases, and 95 runs scored.

He made his MLB debut with the Red Sox in 1995, and played a total of 52 games from 1995-1996. He was traded to the Texas Rangers in 1996, but was released without playing in a major league game with the Rangers.

He was signed by the Yakult Swallows in 1997, and was immediately heralded as one of the greatest players ever to come to Japan by Swallows manager Katsuya Nomura. Hosey worked hard to get used to Japanese pitching, and his work paid off in his first season, where he beat out Hideki Matsui to lead the Central League with 38 home runs. Opposing pitchers seemed to have figured him out in 1998, and he ended the season with 18 home runs. He was released during the 1998 off-season.
