= Tim Van Egmond =

American baseball player (born 1969)

- Pitcher
- Born: May 31, 1969 (age 56); Shreveport, Louisiana, U.S.
- Batted: Right Threw: Right

MLB debut
- June 26, 1994, for the Boston Red Sox

Last MLB appearance
- September 25, 1996, for the Milwaukee Brewers

MLB statistics
- Win–loss record: 5–9
- Earned run average: 5.96
- Strikeouts: 60
- Stats at Baseball Reference

Teams
- Boston Red Sox (1994–1995); Milwaukee Brewers (1996)

Timothy Layne Van Egmond (born May 31, 1969) is an American former Major League Baseball pitcher who played with the Boston Red Sox (1994–1995) and Milwaukee Brewers (1996). He batted and threw right-handed.

Van Egmond was born in Shreveport, Louisiana. He graduated from East Coweta High School in Georgia without receiving any attention from college baseball programs. It was not until he played in a summer league that he drew the interest of Newnan High School and Southern Union State Community College baseball coach Jabo Jordan. After two seasons at Southern Union, he continued his college baseball career at Jacksonville State University. With the Jacksonville State Gamecocks, he was named the Most Outstanding Player of both the 1990 and 1991 NCAA Division II baseball tournaments. He was selected in the 17th round of the 1991 amateur draft by the Boston Red Sox.

His first professional season, 1992, was arguably his best as a professional pitcher. Pitching for the Lynchburg Red Sox of the class A Carolina League, Van Egmond posted a 12–4 record with a 3.41 ERA in 28 games, 27 of which were starts. He followed that with a 6–12 record and 3.98 ERA for the AA New Britain Red Sox of the Eastern League in 1993. He was assigned to the Pawtucket Red Sox, Boston's AAA affiliate in the International League, in 1994 and made 20 starts, going 9–5 with a 3.78 ERA in 119 innings.

Van Egmond made his MLB debut on June 26, 1994, against the Milwaukee Brewers. Van Egmond pitched 7 2/3 innings in his first big league start, yielding five earned runs on five hits and four walks while striking out seven. The Brewers won the game 5–4, handing Van Egmond his first MLB loss. He recorded his first big league victory on July 29, 1994, at Fenway Park as the Red Sox defeated the Brewers 7–2. Van Egmond threw a complete game to earn the victory, yielding two runs on five hits and three walks, striking out four Milwaukee hitters.

The Red Sox released Van Egmond on June 6, 1996, and he signed with the Brewers as a free agent three days later. Having posted a 5–3 record with a 4.35 ERA with Pawtucket before being released, Van Egmond performed well for the Brewers' American Association affiliate New Orleans Zephyrs, going 5–1 with a 1.50 ERA in seven starts. His AAA performance in New Orleans earned him some time on the big league roster. He made 12 appearances with the Brewers, nine of which were starts. His final appearance at the big league level came September 25, 1996 in the first game of a double-header against the New York Yankees at Yankee Stadium. Taking the mound as the starting pitcher, the Yankees pounded Van Egmond for eight runs on four hits and four walks in 1 1/3 innings of work en route to a 19–2 drubbing of the Brewers.

Van Egmond pitched in the minor leagues with Milwaukee affiliates but never again appeared in a big league uniform before retiring after going 0–6 with a 4.50 ERA in 11 appearances with the AA Huntsville Stars of the Southern League and Louisville RiverBats of the International League in 1999.

In a three-year MLB career, Van Egmond posted a 5–9 record with a 5.96 ERA in 99 2/3 innings. In eight minor league season, he went 49–45 with a 3.81 ERA in 831 innings.
