= Vaughn Eshelman =

American baseball player (1969–2018)

- Pitcher
- Born: May 22, 1969; Philadelphia, Pennsylvania, U.S.
- Died: July 24, 2018 (aged 49); Spring, Texas, U.S.
- Batted: Left Threw: Left

MLB debut
- May 2, 1995, for the Boston Red Sox

Last MLB appearance
- July 11, 1997, for the Boston Red Sox

MLB statistics
- Win–loss record: 15–9
- Earned run average: 6.07
- Strikeouts: 118
- Stats at Baseball Reference

Teams
- Boston Red Sox (1995–1997)

Vaughn Michael Eshelman (May 22, 1969 – July 24, 2018) was an American Major League Baseball pitcher who played from 1995 through 1997 for the Boston Red Sox. Listed at 6 ft 3 in (1.91 m), 205 lb., he batted and threw left-handed.

Eshelman was born at the University of Pennsylvania Hospital in Philadelphia and lived in western Pennsylvania and Dayton, Ohio until his family moved to Houston in 1980. He pitched for Westfield High School in Houston, Blinn College, and the University of Houston before being drafted by the Baltimore Orioles in the fourth round of the 1991 amateur draft. Eshelman signed with the Orioles on June 5, 1991. The Red Sox organization acquired him in the Rule 5 draft on December 5, 1994. In his debut with Boston's major league club on May 2, 1995, he hurled six shutout innings in an 8–0 victory over the New York Yankees.

In a three-season career, Eshelman posted a 15–9 record with a 6.07 ERA and 118 strikeouts and in 83 appearances, including 30 starts, 11 games finished, and 212 innings of work.

He was sidelined during Spring Training in 1996 after a bizarre non-sports injury, burning his hands on a candle in his hotel room. His wife, Julie, was trying to warm a bottle for their baby son, Evan, when a washcloth caught fire. Eshelman suffered second-degree burns putting it out.

The Red Sox waived Eshelman after the 1997 season, and he was picked up by the Oakland Athletics organization on October 15. A month later, on November 18, the Tampa Bay Devil Rays selected him in the 1997 expansion draft. He never pitched for Tampa Bay, but he later enjoyed minor league stints in the Cincinnati Reds organization in 2000, and the New York Mets organization in 2001.

After baseball, Eshelman worked for Stanley, Black and Decker Tools and Fasteners as an area sales manager.

In 2018, Eshelman's health started to decline, and he was in need of a liver transplant while he was hospitalized in Houston in February. After having a liver transplant on March 6, his father, Larry, stated that he had "a long, tough road ahead." Eshelman died on July 24, 2018, at the age of 49.

== Personal life ==
Eshelman was married to his high school sweetheart, Julie Menard, for over 25 years. They had two sons who played college baseball, Evan (Texas A&M) and Ryan (Blinn College). His parents, Larry and Janet Eshelman of Cypress, Texas, and brothers Dain of Ocoee, Florida and Brian of Cypress, Texas, survived him. Another brother, Kyle, predeceased him.
