= Eric Gunderson =

American baseball player (born 1966)

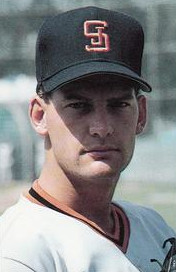
- Gunderson in 1988
- Relief pitcher
- Born: March 29, 1966 (age 60); Portland, Oregon, U.S.
- Batted: Right Threw: Left

MLB debut
- April 11, 1990, for the San Francisco Giants

Last MLB appearance
- May 17, 2000, for the Toronto Blue Jays

MLB statistics
- Win–loss record: 8–11
- Earned run average: 4.95
- Strikeouts: 137
- Stats at Baseball Reference

Teams
- San Francisco Giants (1990–1991); Seattle Mariners (1992); New York Mets (1994–1995); Boston Red Sox (1995–1996); Texas Rangers (1997–1999); Toronto Blue Jays (2000)

Eric Andrew Gunderson (born March 29, 1966) is a former Major League Baseball (MLB) pitcher who played in the majors from 1990–1992 and 1994–2000.

Gunderson graduated from Aloha High School near Portland, Oregon in 1984, then played college baseball for Portland State Vikings. He had a 24–14 record with 214 strikeouts in three college seasons. Upon reaching the majors, he said he had not been a good athlete in high school or college.

The San Francisco Giants selected Gunderson in the second round of the 1987 MLB draft. He was a minor league all-star in 1987 and 1988. He started the 1990 season in the majors, then was demoted to the minors on April 27, returning as a September call-up and earning his first MLB win. He started 1991 in the majors but was sent down on April 16. San Francisco released him in March 1992.

Gunderson signed with the Seattle Mariners two weeks later, returning to the majors in June. He took the loss in his first game for Seattle after issuing two balks in one inning against the Milwaukee Brewers. He was again demoted, returning in September. In his first game back, he intentionally walked Rubén Sierra, then was replaced. Gunderson was suspended for five games at the end of the month for his role in a bench-clearing brawl against the California Angels, when Luis Polonia charged the mound after an inside pitch from Gunderson. Seattle released Gunderson in April 1993, and he did not pitch in the majors that year.

Gunderson was released by the San Diego Padres after spring training in 1994, then signed with the New York Mets in May. He returned to MLB in July. He has a 0.00 earned run average in 9 innings pitched over 14 games. Gunderson had a blown save with the Mets in July 1995, then was put on waivers in August. The Mariners claimed him, though he was claimed by the Boston Red Sox six days later. He also pitched for Boston in 1996.

Gunderson signed three consecutive one-year contracts with the Texas Rangers beginning in 1997, making $510,000 in 1998, then re-signing for $450,000 for the 1999 season. He was almost part of a trade to the Toronto Blue Jays for Roger Clemens in February 1999, though Toronto opted to send Clemens to the New York Yankees. Gunderson signed with Toronto after the season, pitching in his final MLB season in 2000. Toronto traded him back to San Francisco in July though he never returned to the majors. He pitched for two Triple-A teams in 2001.

== Personal life ==
Gunderson and his wife married in December 1990.
