= Brian Bark =

American baseball player (born 1968)

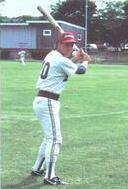
- Bark with the Orleans Cardinals in 1988
- Pitcher
- Born: August 26, 1968 (age 58); Baltimore, Maryland
- Batted: Left Threw: Left

MLB debut
- July 6, 1995, for the Boston Red Sox

Last MLB appearance
- September 8, 1995, for the Boston Red Sox

MLB statistics
- Win–loss record: 0–0
- Earned run average: 0.00
- Strikeouts: 0
- Stats at Baseball Reference

Teams
- Boston Red Sox (1995)

Brian Stuart Bark (born August 26, 1968), is a former relief pitcher in Major League Baseball who played for the Boston Red Sox in the 1995 season. Bark batted and threw left-handed

== Baseball career ==
=== Amateur ===
Bark attended both Randallstown High School and North Carolina State University, where he played college baseball for the Wolfpack. In 1988 and 1989, he played collegiate summer baseball with the Orleans Cardinals of the Cape Cod Baseball League, and was named a league all-star in 1989. Bark was first drafted by the Baltimore Orioles in the 28th round of the 1989 amateur draft, but did not sign. He was then drafted by the Atlanta Braves in the 12th round of the 1990 amateur draft.

=== Professional ===
Bark compiled a career minor league pitching record of 36–29 with 10 saves and a 3.56 ERA over 7 seasons.

In 1995, Bark posted a 0–0 record for the MLB Boston Red Sox with a 0.00 ERA in 2 1/3 scoreless innings pitched over three appearances.

== Personal life ==
Bark received a Bachelor of Arts degree in Communications from North Carolina State University and a Master of Science in Information Systems from UMBC.

Prior to his current role with Nutanix, he was EVP, CIO of Sinclair Broadcast Group. Bark was also Chief Business and Innovation Strategist at Hewlett Packard Enterprise and held various Executive Technology (CIO) and Vice President roles at Smiths Group.

== See also ==
- List of Jewish Major League Baseball players
