= Mike Stanley =

American baseball player (born 1963)

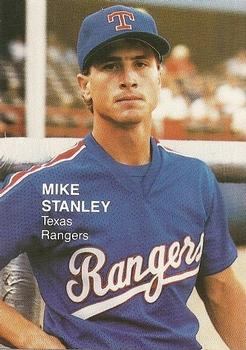
- Catcher
- Born: June 25, 1963 (age 63); Fort Lauderdale, Florida, U.S.
- Batted: Right Threw: Right

MLB debut
- June 24, 1986, for the Texas Rangers

Last MLB appearance
- September 29, 2000, for the Oakland Athletics

MLB statistics
- Batting average: .270
- Home runs: 187
- Runs batted in: 702
- Stats at Baseball Reference

Teams
- Texas Rangers (1986–1991); New York Yankees (1992–1995); Boston Red Sox (1996–1997); New York Yankees (1997); Toronto Blue Jays (1998); Boston Red Sox (1998–2000); Oakland Athletics (2000)

Career highlights and awards
- All-Star (1995); Silver Slugger Award (1993)

Robert Michael Stanley (born June 25, 1963) is an American former college and professional baseball player who was a catcher in Major League Baseball for fifteen years. Stanley played college baseball for the University of Florida, and thereafter, he played professionally with the Texas Rangers (1986–1991), New York Yankees (1992–1995, 1997), Boston Red Sox (1996–1997, 1998–2000), Toronto Blue Jays (1998) and Oakland Athletics (2000).

Stanley was a 1995 American League All-Star, won the 1993 Silver Slugger Award at catcher, and was a member of the Yankees' 1995 Wild-card team and the Athletics' 2000 AL Western Division Championship team.

== Career ==
Stanley was born in Fort Lauderdale, Florida, in 1963. He received an athletic scholarship to attend the University of Florida in Gainesville, Florida, where he played for coach Jack Rhine and coach Joe Arnold's Florida Gators baseball team in National Collegiate Athletic Association (NCAA) competition from 1982 to 1985. Stanley primarily played catcher for the Gators, but sometimes played first and third base, and also served as the Gators' designated hitter periodically. He received Southeastern Conference (SEC) All-Tournament honors in 1982, and 1984 and 1985, and was a member of the NCAA Regional All-Tournament team in 1985. While Stanley was a Gator, the team won SEC regular season and SEC tournament championships in both 1982 and 1984. He was later inducted into the University of Florida Athletic Hall of Fame, and remains the Gators' career record holder for runs scored and runs batted in (RBIs).

Stanley hit more than twenty home runs in a season three times during his career. His best all-around season at the plate came in 1993 with the Yankees, when he hit .305 with twenty-six homers and eighty-four RBI. He also hit .300 in 1994, and he notched a career-high twenty-nine homers in 1998.

Stanley became a first baseman/designated hitter at the end of his career. He finished as a .270 career hitter with 187 homers, 702 RBI and a .370 career on-base percentage. Stanley also hit well in the postseason, recording a .356 batting average and .434 on-base percentage in five postseason series. Stanley was one of the players involved in the last Yankees/Red Sox trade until 2014.

As a Ranger, Stanley caught the last of Nolan Ryan's seven career no-hitters on May 1, 1991. On June 27, 1987, he hit the first ever pinch grand slam in Rangers history against the Twins.

Following his retirement as a player, Stanley was hired to serve as bench coach for the Red Sox during the 2002 season. He resigned after the season to spend more time with his family.

In 2008 Stanley attended Yankees Old Timers Day for the first time.

== See also ==
- List of Florida Gators baseball players
- List of University of Florida Athletic Hall of Fame members
