= Rick Aguilera =

American baseball player (born 1961)

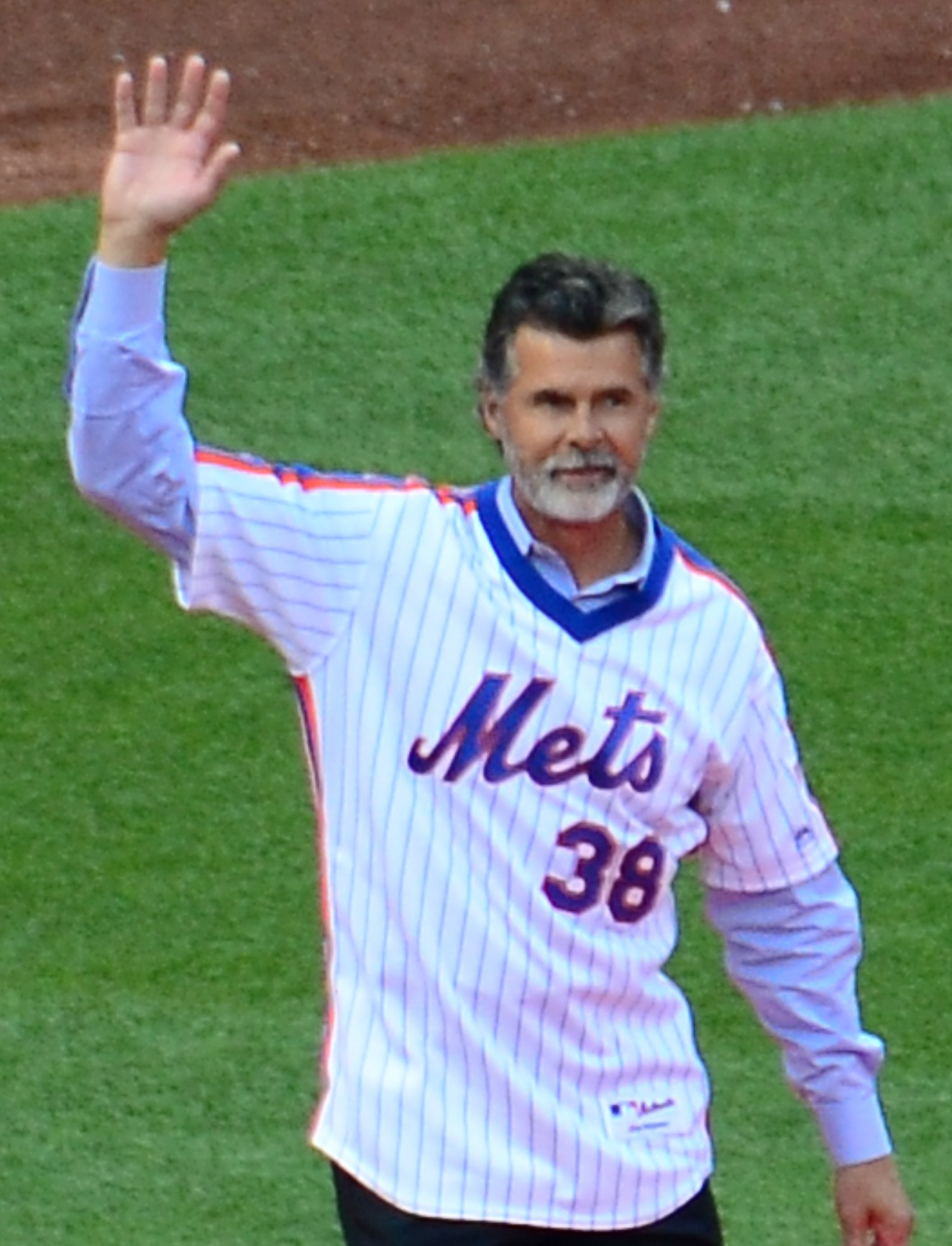
- Aguilera in 2016
- Pitcher
- Born: December 31, 1961 (age 64); San Gabriel, California, U.S.
- Batted: Right Threw: Right

MLB debut
- June 12, 1985, for the New York Mets

Last MLB appearance
- September 6, 2000, for the Chicago Cubs

MLB statistics
- Win–loss record: 86–81
- Earned run average: 3.57
- Strikeouts: 1,030
- Saves: 318
- Stats at Baseball Reference

Teams
- New York Mets (1985–1989); Minnesota Twins (1989–1995); Boston Red Sox (1995); Minnesota Twins (1996–1999); Chicago Cubs (1999–2000)

Career highlights and awards
- 3× All-Star (1991–1993); 2× World Series champion (1986, 1991); Minnesota Twins Hall of Fame

Richard Warren Aguilera (born December 31, 1961) is an American former professional baseball player and coach. He played in Major League Baseball as a right-handed pitcher from 1985 to 2000. Aguilera won a world championship as a member of the New York Mets in 1986, then won a second world championship as a member of the Minnesota Twins in 1991. He also played for the Boston Red Sox and the Chicago Cubs. In 2008, Aguilera was inducted into the Minnesota Twins Hall of Fame.

== Early life ==
Aguilera attended Edgewood High School in West Covina, California, and played third base for their baseball team. Following graduation, he was drafted by the St. Louis Cardinals in the 37th round of the 1980 amateur draft on June 3, but did not sign and instead chose to attend Brigham Young University (BYU). After three years at BYU, in which he had made the transition from third base to pitcher, the Mets drafted him in the third round of the 1983 amateur draft on June 6.

== New York Mets ==
Although he did not sign with the Mets organization until September, he was able to get into 16 games (going 5–6 with a 3.72 ERA in 104 innings) for the Little Falls Mets in the low A-ball New York–Penn League. The following season he was promoted to the Lynchburg Mets in the high-A Carolina League where he was 8–3 with a 2.34 ERA and 101 strikeouts in 88 1/3 innings before being promoted to the Jackson Mets in the AA Texas League. In 1985, Aguilera was promoted to the AAA Tidewater Tides and was 6–4 with a 2.51 ERA in 11 starts before being promoted to the majors.

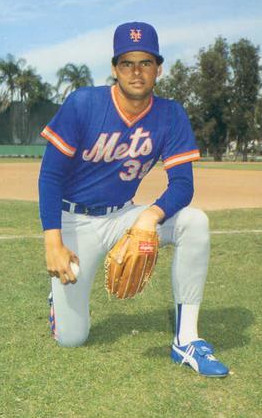
Aguilera in 1986

Aguilera saw his first MLB action on June 12, pitching two innings of scoreless relief and getting the win against the Philadelphia Phillies in a game started by Ron Darling. In the middle of a fierce divisional race with the Cardinals, Aguilera was particularly effective in July, going 3–0 with a 0.89 ERA, and ended the season 10–7 as the Cardinals edged out the Mets.

Aguilera posted an identical record the next year in 1986 as the number five starter for the division-winning Mets. That season, he was involved in a fight with Houston police outside a disco which resulted in the arrest of not only himself, but also teammates Bob Ojeda, Tim Teufel, and Darling, later referred to as 'Cooters-gate'. Misdemeanor charges against Aguilera were eventually dropped. In the 1986 postseason, Aguilera pitched five scoreless innings in relief against the Houston Astros in the NLCS. Despite a 12.00 ERA in the World Series, he was the pitcher of record in the Mets' dramatic Game 6 comeback victory, getting the win despite giving up the two runs which surrendered the lead to Boston in the top of the 10th inning. Injuries slowed him the next two years, as he was limited to 17 starts in 1987 and 3 starts in 1988 by an elbow injury that required surgery. With injury concerns and seven innings of one-run relief in the 1988 NLCS, the Mets decided to experiment with Aguilera as a reliever. After returning to the team in 1989, he was converted to a long reliever. Although he was unhappy in a low-leverage bullpen role and asked to be traded, Aguilera thrived in the role, going 6–6 with a 2.34 ERA, 80 strikeouts and 7 saves in 36 appearances.

When Dwight Gooden was placed on the disabled list in early July 1989, the Mets began looking for a veteran starting pitcher via trade, rather than promote from within into the open rotation slot, with young pitchers such as Aguilera, Kevin Tapani, and David West rumored as trade bait. After the Mets lost their seventh game in a row ahead of the trade deadline, Aguilera was included in a last-minute deadline deal, along with West, Tapani, reliever Tim Drummond and a player to be named (which on October 16 became reliever Jack Savage), for Minnesota Twins ace Frank Viola.

== Minnesota Twins ==
Although he got his wish and completed the season with the Twins as a starter, going 3–5 with a 3.72 ERA and 3 complete games in 75 2/3 innings, he was shifted to the closer's role in 1990 and responded by saving 32 games for a team that went 74–88. The next year, his relief pitching was instrumental in the Twins' surprising division title, as he saved 42 games with a 2.35 ERA, a team record that would stand until Eddie Guardado broke it in 2002 with 45 saves. He went on to save three of four victories in the ALCS and the first two games of the World Series against the Atlanta Braves. In Game 3, he became the first pitcher to pinch hit in a World Series game since Don Drysdale in 1965, flying out in the top of the 12th with the bases loaded and two outs before giving up the game-winning hit in the bottom of the inning. He would also win Game 6 of the series. Aguilera became one of baseball's premier closers with the Twins from 1990 to 1995 and was named to three consecutive All-Star teams from 1991 to 1993.

== Boston Red Sox ==
With the Twins well on their way to finishing 44 games behind the AL Central division winning Cleveland Indians in 1995, Aguilera was traded to the Red Sox on July 6 in exchange for minor league outfielder J. J. Johnson and pitcher Frank Rodriguez. The move was made official while the Red Sox were in Minneapolis playing the Twins and after walking 20 feet (6.1 m) down to the visitors dressing room, Aguilera was called on to convert a save opportunity in his very first appearance – striking out former teammate Kirby Puckett to help nail down a 5–4 win. Aguilera would later state that the trade that brought him to Boston was the lowest point of his career. He had known he was likely to be traded and made clear in the weeks leading up to the trade that he was not happy about it. He was about to attain 10/5 status at the time (10 years in the majors, 5 with the same team)--a status which would have given him veto power over any trade, and he went on record saying he would exercise that veto power should he reach the milestone without being traded. All the same, he would perform well for the AL East champion Red Sox, going 2–2 with 20 saves and a 2.67 ERA in 30 relief appearances. Like a number of his teammates, Aguilera struggled in the playoffs, giving up one run on three hits with one strikeout in two-thirds of an inning.

== Return to Minnesota ==
A free agent following the 1995 season, Aguilera opted to return to the Twins. Minnesota skipper Tom Kelly installed Aguilera as a starting pitcher—a position he hadn't been in since starting 11 games for the team in 1989—rather than his familiar closer role. Despite early season shoulder and wrist injuries (with the latter reportedly caused by lifting his wife's suitcase the last week of spring training) forcing Aguilera to miss six weeks early in the season, the veteran battled his way to an 8–6 record with a 5.42 ERA in 19 starts, including a pair of complete games.

The following season, the experiment of Aguilera as a starting pitcher had ended midway through spring training and the veteran returned to the bullpen. At age 35, he went 5–4 with 26 saves and a 3.82 ERA in 61 outings. In 1998, he recorded 38 saves (the most since saving 41 games in 1992) in 68 games for the Twins. In 1999, Aguilera had gone 3–1 with 6 saves and a 1.27 ERA in 17 games before the Twins traded the 37-year-old and pitcher Scott Downs to the Chicago Cubs for Kyle Lohse and Jason Ryan.

== Chicago Cubs ==
Aguilera pitched well for the Cubs in 1999, posting a 6–3 record with 8 saves and a 3.69 ERA in 44 games as a middle reliever, set-up man, and occasional closer.

At age 38, he entered the 2000 season, his 16th season in the big leagues, as the team's closer. On June 2 of that year, Aguilera became the 13th member of the 300 save club after pitching a scoreless inning against the Detroit Tigers.

Aguilera went 1–2 with 29 saves in 54 appearances, but blew eight of his save opportunities and finished with a 4.91 ERA for the last-place Cubs.

== Life after baseball ==
After spending the off-season weighing the possibility of coming back for a 17th season, Aguilera officially retired on February 17, 2001. At the time of his retirement, his 318 saves trailed only Lee Smith, John Franco, Dennis Eckersley, Jeff Reardon, Randy Myers, Rollie Fingers, and John Wetteland in career saves. As of June 2025, he stands 24th on the career saves list. Aguilera was on top of the Twins / Senators franchise list for career saves with 254 until Joe Nathan surpassed him on August 10, 2011. In addition, Aguilera's save totals in 1991 (42 saves), 1992 (41), and 1998 (38) are 5th, 7th, and 10th on the franchise's top 10 season saves list (as of the end of the 2015 season).

Aguilera is married to wife Sherry (m. 1988) and the couple have two children, daughter Rachel (born 1991) and son Austin (born 1996). A devout Christian, Aguilera now lives in the San Diego suburb of Rancho Santa Fe, California and dedicates his time to his family and real estate investments. He has also served as the pitching coach for the Santa Fe Christian High School baseball team from 2001 to 2005 and as the head coach from 2005 to 2007.

On June 21, 2008, Rick Aguilera was inducted into the Minnesota Twins Hall of Fame.
