= Rhéal Cormier =

Canadian baseball player (1967–2021)

- Pitcher
- Born: April 23, 1967; Moncton, New Brunswick, Canada
- Died: March 8, 2021 (aged 53); Cap-Pelé, New Brunswick, Canada
- Batted: Left Threw: Left

MLB debut
- August 15, 1991, for the St. Louis Cardinals

Last MLB appearance
- April 18, 2007, for the Cincinnati Reds

MLB statistics
- Win–loss record: 71–64
- Earned run average: 4.03
- Strikeouts: 760
- Stats at Baseball Reference

Teams
- St. Louis Cardinals (1991–1994); Boston Red Sox (1995); Montreal Expos (1996–1997); Boston Red Sox (1999–2000); Philadelphia Phillies (2001–2006); Cincinnati Reds (2006–2007)

Member of the Canadian

Baseball Hall of Fame
- Induction: 2012

Rhéal Paul Cormier (French pronunciation: [ʁeal pol kɔʁmje]; April 23, 1967 – March 8, 2021) was a Canadian-American professional baseball left-handed pitcher who played in Major League Baseball (MLB), for the St. Louis Cardinals, Boston Red Sox (twice), Montreal Expos, Philadelphia Phillies, and Cincinnati Reds for 16 seasons, between 1991 through 2007.

He was inducted into the Canadian Baseball Hall of Fame in the Class of 2012.

== Early life ==
Cormier was born in Moncton, New Brunswick, on April 23, 1967. His parents were Ronald and Jeanette Cormier; they were of Acadian descent. Cormier attended Polyvalente Louis-J.-Robichaud in his hometown. He went on to study at the Community College of Rhode Island, earning All-American honours in 1987 and 1988. Cormier pitched for the Canadian national baseball team at the 1987 Pan American Games and the 1988 Olympics. He was subsequently drafted by the St. Louis Cardinals in the sixth round of the 1988 Major League Baseball draft.

== Professional career ==
Cormier made his major league debut on August 15, 1991. He was the St. Louis Cardinals' starting pitcher against the New York Mets, going six innings, giving up one earned run, and striking out two. He pitched for St. Louis through the 1994 season. On April 9, 1995, St. Louis traded Cormier and Mark Whiten to the Boston Red Sox for Cory Bailey and Scott Cooper. In Boston, Cormier split time as a starter and a reliever. He had a 4.07 earned run average (ERA) in 1995.

Following the 1995 season, the Red Sox traded Cormier with Shayne Bennett and Ryan McGuire to the Montreal Expos for Wil Cordero and Bryan Eversgerd. He only played in one game for the Expos in 1997, suffering an injury on April 5, 1997, in a game against the Colorado Rockies where he gave up five runs in 1 1/3 innings. The injury required Tommy John surgery and he transitioned to the bullpen for the remainder of his career starting in 1999.

In 1998, he signed as a free agent with the Cleveland Indians and began the year in the minor leagues before shoulder problems ended his season.

In 1999, Cormier signed a free agent deal to return to Boston. In two seasons, he made 124 appearances for the Red Sox, all of which came in relief. After the 2000 season, the Philadelphia Phillies signed the reliever as a free agent. In the next six seasons with the Phillies (his longest tenure with any major league team), Cormier had his most successful years. In 2003, he logged 84 2/3 innings and a career-best ERA of 1.70. In 2004, he made 84 appearances, a career high. Cormier was the last Phillies pitcher to record a win at Veterans Stadium in 2003 and the first to record one at the new Citizens Bank Park in 2004. On July 31, 2006, Cormier was traded by Philadelphia to the Cincinnati Reds for pitching prospect Justin Germano. The Reds, leading the National League (NL) wild card race at the time of the trade, sought bullpen help through the trade. The team failed to make the playoffs, however, finishing the season 8 games back in the wild card race. Cormier's 2006 season with the Reds included 21 appearances and a 4.50 ERA.

On April 28, 2007, Cormier was designated for assignment by the Reds after a poor start to the 2007 campaign. He had three innings pitched (IP), a 9.00 ERA, and one strikeout while pitching for Cincinnati that season. On May 13, 2007, the Atlanta Braves signed Cormier to a minor league contract and assigned him to their AAA-affiliate, the Richmond Braves. He played only briefly for them before deciding to retire.

In 2008, Cormier joined the Moncton Mets, a senior team based in Moncton, New Brunswick, in an attempt to make a comeback and join the Canadian Olympic Team participating in the 2008 Olympics in Beijing. He had pitched for Moncton 21 years earlier, prior to his major league career.

== International career ==
=== 2006 World Baseball Classic ===
Prior to the 2006 season, Cormier played for the Canada national baseball team in the World Baseball Classic. Despite winning two of three games, the team failed to advance beyond the first round. While their record matched Team USA and Team Mexico, they were eliminated in the tie breaker because they allowed the most runs. Cormier appeared in two of the games (against Mexico and South Africa), pitching 1 2/3 innings, giving up one hit, and allowing no earned runs.

=== Olympics ===
After representing Canada at the 1987 Pan American Games, Cormier played for the Canadian national baseball team in the 1988 Summer Olympics in Seoul, South Korea; at the time baseball was a demonstration sport. The Canadian team did not win a medal during this competition, ending with a 1–2 record. The squad's lone win, however, did come against the eventual gold medal-winning American team.

In 2008, Cormier played for the Canadian national baseball team in the 2008 Summer Olympics. At age 41, Cormier was the oldest baseball player in the competition.

== Personal life ==
Cormier and his wife Lucienne (née LeBlanc) had two children, Justin and Morgan. Cormier became a United States citizen on September 22, 2004.

In 2012, Cormier was inducted into the Canadian Baseball Hall of Fame.

In January 2020, Cormier was diagnosed with a tumour in his lungs. On March 8, 2021, Cormier died of pancreatic cancer at the age of 53.
