= Scott Kamieniecki =

American baseball player (born 1964)

- Pitcher
- Born: April 19, 1964 (age 62); Mount Clemens, Michigan, U.S.
- Batted: Right Threw: Right

MLB debut
- June 18, 1991, for the New York Yankees

Last MLB appearance
- October 1, 2000, for the Atlanta Braves

MLB statistics
- Win–loss record: 53–59
- Earned run average: 4.52
- Strikeouts: 542
- Stats at Baseball Reference

Teams
- New York Yankees (1991–1996); Baltimore Orioles (1997–1999); Cleveland Indians (2000); Atlanta Braves (2000)

Scott Andrew Kamieniecki (born April 19, 1964) is an American former Major League Baseball (MLB) pitcher who played for the New York Yankees, Baltimore Orioles, Cleveland Indians, and Atlanta Braves between 1991 and 2000.

== Biography ==
A native of Mount Clemens, Michigan, Kamieniecki played college baseball at the University of Michigan. In 1984, he played collegiate summer baseball for the Harwich Mariners of the Cape Cod Baseball League (CCBL). A league all-star, he posted a 4-1 record with a 2.14 ERA, striking out 54 batters in 67.1 innings. He was inducted into the CCBL Hall of Fame in 2011.

Kamieniecki currently resides in Clarkston, Michigan. His youngest son, Alan, attended Michigan State University and his oldest son, Matt, played college baseball for the Ball State Cardinals.
