= 1997 Toronto Blue Jays season =

1997 Toronto Blue Jays
- League: American League
- Division: East
- Ballpark: SkyDome
- City: Toronto
- Record: 76–86 (.469)
- Divisional place: 5th
- Owners: Interbrew, Canadian Imperial Bank of Commerce
- General managers: Gord Ash
- Managers: Cito Gaston, Melvin Douglas Queen
- Television: CBC Television (Brian Williams, John Cerutti); The Sports Network (Dan Shulman, Buck Martinez)
- Radio: CJCL (AM) (Jerry Howarth, Tom Cheek)

The 1997 Toronto Blue Jays season was the franchise's 21st season of Major League Baseball. It resulted in the Blue Jays finishing fifth in the American League East with a record of 76 wins and 86 losses. With a massive redesign of their logos and uniforms, the Blue Jays attempted to re-establish themselves in the American League East by signing Roger Clemens via free agency and bringing All-Stars Carlos García and Orlando Merced through trade. Although Clemens rejuvenated himself with the Blue Jays (en route to one of the best-ever single seasons by a starting pitcher, winning the Cy Young Award and the pitchers' triple crown), both Garcia and Merced ended up being flops as dismal overall hitting and an inconsistent bullpen doomed the Blue Jays once again to a last-place finish. 1997 also marked the end of the road for manager Cito Gaston, being fired near the end of the season (Gaston would eventually return to the team in 2008). Longtime fan-favourite Joe Carter also played in his final season for the Blue Jays, as he was released at the end of the season.

== Transactions ==
Transactions by the Toronto Blue Jays during the off-season before the 1997 season.

=== October 1996 ===
October 2	Dane Johnson selected off of waivers by the Oakland Athletics.
October 3	Brian Bohanon granted free agency (signed with New York Mets to a one-year, $205,000 contract on December 18, 1996).
October 15	Mike Huff granted free agency. Félix José granted free agency. Scott Pose granted free agency (signed with New York Yankees to a one-year contract on November 27, 1996).

=== November 1996 ===
November 14	Acquired Carlos García, Orlando Merced and Dan Plesac from the Pittsburgh Pirates for José Silva, Brandon Cromer, José Pett and players to be named later (Craig Wilson, Abraham Núñez and Mike Halperin on December 11, 1996). Re-signed Juan Guzmán to a two-year, $9.5 million contract.
November 18	Juan Samuel granted free agency (signed with Toronto Blue Jays to a one-year, $375,000 contract on December 18, 1996).
November 20	Acquired Jason Stevenson from the Chicago Cubs for Miguel Cairo.
November 27	Jeff Ware selected off of waivers by the Milwaukee Brewers.

=== December 1996 ===
December 9	Travis Baptist drafted by the Minnesota Twins in the 1996 MLB Rule 5 draft. Mike Johnson drafted by the San Francisco Giants in the 1996 MLB Rule 5 draft. Tom Davey selected by the Baltimore Orioles in the 1996 Minor League Draft. Signed free agent Benito Santiago from the Philadelphia Phillies to a two-year, $6.5 million contract.
December 11	Acquired Anton French from the Detroit Tigers for Roberto Durán.
December 11	Signed Pat Hentgen to a contract extension through the 2001 season (three-year, $20 million contract).
December 13	Signed free agent Roger Clemens from the Boston Red Sox to a four-year, $40 million contract.
December 18	Re-signed free agent Juan Samuel to a one-year, $375,000 contract.
December 20	Acquired Robert Person from the New York Mets for John Olerud and cash.

=== February 1997 ===
February 17	Signed free agent Jeff Manto from the Cleveland Indians to a one-year, $240,000 contract.

=== March 1997 ===
March 20	Tom Davey returned from the Baltimore Orioles.

== Regular season ==
=== Opening-day starters ===
- Joe Carter
- Carlos Delgado
- Carlos García
- Alex Gonzalez
- Shawn Green
- Pat Hentgen
- Orlando Merced
- Otis Nixon
- Benito Santiago
- Ed Sprague Jr.

=== Interleague play ===
- June 30 – The first interleague game between the Montreal Expos and the Toronto Blue Jays took place at the SkyDome. The Expos won the game by a score of 2–1.

==== Expos vs. Jays ====
June 30, SkyDome, Toronto, Ontario

Team	1	2	3	4	5	6	7	8	9	R	H	E
Montreal	0	1	0	0	0	1	0	0	0	2	6	0
Toronto	0	0	0	0	0	0	1	0	0	1	3	0
W: Pedro Martínez (10–3) L: Pat Hentgen (8–5)
Home Runs: Vladimir Guerrero (4), Carlos Delgado (15) Attendance: 37,430 Time: 2:03

==== Batting ====
Montreal Expos	AB	R	H	RBI	Toronto Blue Jays	AB	R	H	RBI
Grudzielanek, ss	3	1	1	0	Nixon cf	4	0	1	0
Lansing 2b	4	0	0	0	Merced dh	4	0	0	0
Santangelo 3b	4	0	0	0	Carter lf	4	0	0	0
Segui 1b	3	0	2	1	Delgado 1b	2	1	1	1
Rodriguez lf	4	0	0	0	Sprague 3b	3	0	0	0
Orsulak lf	0	0	0	0	Green rf	3	0	0	0
Guerrero rf	4	1	2	1	Santiago c	3	0	0	0
McGuire dh	3	0	0	0	Gonzalez ss	3	0	1	0
White cf	3	0	0	0	Garcia 2b	3	0	0	0
Widger c	3	0	1	0	NONE	0	0	0	0
Totals	31	2	6	2	Totals	29	1	3	1

==== Pitching ====
Montreal Expos	IP	H	R	ER	BB	SO
Martinez W (10–3)	9.0	3	1	1	1	10
Totals	9.0	3	1	1	1	10

Toronto Blue Jays	IP	H	R	ER	BB	SO
Hentgen L (8–5)	9.0	6	2	2	1	3
Totals	9.0	6	2	2	1	3

=== Canada Day game ===
The Blue Jays and Expos played to a sold-out Skydome crowd on Canada Day. Legendary Roger Clemens would get the start as the Blue Jays donned red uniforms for the second time. Montreal pitcher Jeff Juden would have a no-hitter through the first six innings until Shawn Green would hit a dramatic home run to break Juden's bid for a no-hitter.

=== Season standings ===
AL East
Team	W	L	Pct.	GB	Home	Road
Baltimore Orioles	98	64	.605	—	46‍–‍35	52‍–‍29
New York Yankees	96	66	.593	2	47‍–‍33	49‍–‍33
Detroit Tigers	79	83	.488	19	42‍–‍39	37‍–‍44
Boston Red Sox	78	84	.481	20	39‍–‍42	39‍–‍42
Toronto Blue Jays	76	86	.469	22	42‍–‍39	34‍–‍47

=== Record vs. opponents ===
1997 American League record Source: MLB Standings Grid – 1997
Team	ANA	BAL	BOS	CWS	CLE	DET	KC	MIL	MIN	NYY	OAK	SEA	TEX	TOR	NL
Anaheim	—	4–7	6–5	6–5	7–4	5–6	6–5	7–4	4–7	4–7	11–1	6–6	8–4	6–5	4–12
Baltimore	7–4	—	5–7	5–6	6–5	6–6	7–4	5–6	10–1	8–4	8–3	7–4	10–1	6–6	8–7
Boston	5–6	7–5	—	3–8	6–5	5–7	3–8	8–3	8–3	4–8	7–4	7–4	3–8	6–6	6–9
Chicago	5–6	6–5	8–3	—	5–7	4–7	11–1	4–7	6–6	2–9	8–3	5–6	3–8	5–6	8–7
Cleveland	4–7	5–6	5–6	7–5	—	6–5	8–3	8–4	8–4	5–6	7–4	3–8	5–6	6–5	9–6
Detroit	6–5	6–6	7–5	7–4	5–6	—	6–5	4–7	4–7	2–10	7–4	4–7	7–4	6–6	8–7
Kansas City	5–6	4–7	8–3	1–11	3–8	5–6	—	6–6	7–5	3–8	3–8	5–6	6–5	5–6	6–9
Milwaukee	4–7	6–5	3–8	7–4	4–8	7–4	6–6	—	5–7	4–7	5–6	5–6	7–4	7–4	8–7
Minnesota	7–4	1–10	3–8	6–6	4–8	7–4	5–7	7–5	—	3–8	7–4	5–6	3–8	3–8	7–8
New York	7–4	4–8	8–4	9–2	6–5	10–2	8–3	7–4	8–3	—	6–5	4–7	7–4	7–5	5–10
Oakland	1–11	3–8	4–7	3–8	4–7	4–7	8–3	6–5	4–7	5–6	—	5–7	5–7	6–5	7–9
Seattle	6–6	4–7	4–7	6–5	8–3	7–4	6–5	6–5	6–5	7–4	7–5	—	8–4	8–3	7–9
Texas	4–8	1–10	8–3	8–3	6–5	4–7	5–6	4–7	8–3	4–7	7–5	4–8	—	4–7	10–6
Toronto	5–6	6–6	6–6	6–5	5–6	6–6	6–5	4–7	8–3	5–7	5–6	3–8	7–4	—	4–11

=== Transactions ===
Transactions for the Toronto Blue Jays during the 1997 regular season.

==== May 1997 ====
May 11	Signed free agent Rubén Sierra from the Cincinnati Reds to a contract.

==== June 1997 ====
June 5	Acquired Ryan Thompson from the Cleveland Indians for Jeff Manto.
June 16	Released Rubén Sierra.

==== July 1997 ====
July 25	Selected Omar Daal of off waivers from the Montreal Expos.
July 29	Acquired Mariano Duncan from the New York Yankees for Angel Ramirez.
July 31	Acquired José Cruz Jr. from the Seattle Mariners for Mike Timlin and Paul Spoljaric.

==== August 1997 ====
August 8	Tilson Brito selected off of waivers by the Oakland Athletics.
August 12	Acquired Bobby Cripps from the Los Angeles Dodgers for Otis Nixon.

=== Roster ===
1997 Toronto Blue Jays
Roster
Pitchers: 40 Carlos Almanzar; 49 Luis Andújar; 50 Chris Carpenter; 21 Roger Clemens; 37 Tim Crabtree; 54 Omar Daal; 45 Kelvim Escobar; 38 Huck Flener; 57 Juan Guzmán; 39 Erik Hanson; 41 Pat Hentgen; 36 Marty Janzen; 31 Robert Person; 19 Dan Plesac; 48 Paul Quantrill; 55 Bill Risley; 52 Kenny Robinson; 24 Paul Spoljaric; 40 Mike Timlin; 54,30 Woody Williams	Catchers: 35 Sandy Martínez; 46 Julio Mosquera; 22 Charlie O'Brien; 18 Benito Santiago; Infielders: 12 Tilson Brito; 43,29 Joe Carter; 3 Felipe Crespo; 25 Carlos Delgado; 24 Mariano Duncan; 28 Tom Evans; 13 Carlos García; 8 Alex Gonzalez; 1 Tomás Pérez; 11 Juan Samuel; 33 Ed Sprague	Outfielders: 5 Jacob Brumfield; 12 Rich Butler; 23 José Cruz Jr.; 15 Shawn Green; 6 Orlando Merced; 2 Otis Nixon; 17 Robert Pérez; 14 Rubén Sierra; 7 Shannon Stewart	Manager: 43 Cito Gaston; 34 Mel Queen; Coaches: 4 Alfredo Griffin (First Base); 10 Jim Lett (Bench); 16 Nick Leyva (Third Base); 34 Mel Queen (Pitching); 18 Gene Tenace (Bullpen); 26 Willie Upshaw (Hitting)

=== Game log ===
1997 Game Log
April: 11–12 (Home: 5–7; Away: 6–5)

#	Date	Opponent	Score	Win	Loss	Save	Attendance	Record
1	April 1	White Sox	6–5 (10)	Castillo (1–0)	Plesac (0–1)	Hernández (1)	40,299	0–1
2	April 2	White Sox	6–1	Clemens (1–0)	Álvarez (0–1)		31,310	1–1
3	April 4	Brewers	6–2	Guzmán (1–0)	Karl (0–1)	Crabtree (1)	26,331	2–1
4	April 5	Brewers	5–2	McAndrew (1–0)	Williams (0–1)	Jones (1)	31,226	2–2
5	April 6	Brewers	4–2	McDonald (1–1)	Hentgen (0–1)	Jones (2)	29,106	2–3
--	April 8	@ White Sox	Postponed (cold weather) Rescheduled for August 19					
6	April 9	@ White Sox	5–0	Clemens (2–0)	Álvarez (0–2)		746	3–3
7	April 10	@ White Sox	4–0	Guzmán (2–0)	Baldwin (0–1)		14,180	4–3
--	April 11	@ Brewers	Postponed (snow) Rescheduled for July 28					
--	April 12	@ Brewers	Postponed (snow) Rescheduled for July 29					
8	April 13	@ Brewers	3–2	Wickman (1–0)	Crabtree (0–1)		19,143	4–4
9	April 14	Royals	3–2	Rusch (2–0)	Quantrill (0–1)	Pichardo (2)	25,642	4–5
10	April 15	Royals	7–5	Rosado (1–0)	Guzmán (2–1)	Pichardo (3)	25,582	4–6
11	April 16	Athletics	4–3	Crabtree (1–1)	Taylor (0–1)		26,139	5–6
12	April 17	Athletics	5–4	Quantrill (1–1)	Groom (0–1)	Timlin (1)	25,625	6–6
13	April 18	@ Rangers	6–5	Hentgen (1–1)	Pavlik (1–2)	Timlin (2)	30,452	7–6
14	April 19	@ Rangers	6–0	Clemens (3–0)	Hill (1–2)		44,206	8–6
15	April 20	@ Rangers	10–5	Witt (3–0)	Guzmán (2–2)		34,333	8–7
16	April 21	@ Angels	5–4 (13)	DeLucia (1–0)	Spoljaric (0–1)		13,413	8–8
17	April 22	@ Angels	7–6	Quantrill (2–1)	James (1–2)	Plesac (1)	13,353	9–8
18	April 23	@ Angels	5–4 (10)	DeLucia (2–0)	Spoljaric (0–2)		13,117	9–9
19	April 25	Mariners	13–8	Ayala (2–0)	Plesac (0–2)		31,215	9–10
20	April 26	Mariners	4–3	Quantrill (3–1)	Lowe (0–1)		31,420	10–10
21	April 27	Mariners	2–1	Johnson (3–0)	Person (0–1)	Charlton (7)	32,160	10–11
22	April 29	@ Royals	6–5 (10)	Pichardo (1–0)	Quantrill (3–2)		12,533	10–12
23	April 30	@ Royals	1–0	Clemens (4–0)	Appier (3–1)	Spoljaric (1)	13,004	11–12

May: 15–13 (Home: 8–7; Away: 7–6)

#	Date	Opponent	Score	Win	Loss	Save	Attendance	Record
24	May 1	@ Royals	8–0	Rosado (2–0)	Williams (0–2)		12,046	11–13
25	May 2	Twins	3–2 (10)	Radke (2–1)	Crabtree (1–2)	Aguilera (5)	30,226	11–14
26	May 3	Twins	6–5	Quantrill (4–2)	Ritchie (2–3)		29,150	12–14
27	May 4	Twins	1–0	Hentgen (2–1)	Tewksbury (1–5)		29,114	13–14
28	May 5	Tigers	3–1	Clemens (5–0)	Olivares (1–2)		27,169	14–14
29	May 6	Tigers	2–1 (10)	Crabtree (2–2)	Jones (1–2)		26,294	15–14
30	May 7	@ Indians	7–1	McDowell (3–2)	Person (0–2)		42,463	15–15
31	May 8	@ Indians	4–3	Guzmán (3–2)	Ogea (2–3)	Quantrill (1)	42,567	16–15
32	May 9	@ Twins	4–1	Hentgen (3–1)	Rodriguez (1–3)	Timlin (3)	13,277	17–15
33	May 10	@ Twins	6–4	Clemens (6–0)	Swindell (2–2)	Crabtree (2)	20,932	18–15
34	May 11	@ Twins	3–2	Williams (1–2)	Aldred (1–5)	Timlin (4)	32,552	19–15
35	May 12	@ Twins	12–2	Radke (3–2)	Carpenter (0–1)		10,830	19–16
36	May 13	@ Tigers	4–0	Lira (2–2)	Guzmán (3–3)		9,992	19–17
37	May 14	@ Tigers	7–2	Hentgen (4–1)	Moehler (2–3)		11,788	20–17
38	May 16	Indians	5–2	Clemens (7–0)	Hershiser (3–2)	Timlin (5)	35,195	21–17
39	May 17	Indians	8–1	Lopez (1–2)	Williams (1–3)		36,220	21–18
40	May 18	Indians	8–6	Ogea (4–3)	Carpenter (0–2)	Jackson (4)	31,137	21–19
41	May 20	@ Yankees	2–0	Hentgen (5–1)	Pettitte (6–2)		20,220	22–19
42	May 21	@ Yankees	4–1	Clemens (8–0)	Rogers (3–2)		19,863	23–19
43	May 23	Angels	12–2	Springer (3–1)	Guzmán (3–4)		30,209	23–20
44	May 24	Angels	3–1	Watson (2–3)	Williams (1–4)	Percival (2)	28,351	23–21
45	May 25	Angels	4–3 (11)	Timlin (1–0)	DeLucia (4–2)		28,180	24–21
46	May 26	Rangers	8–1	Clemens (9–0)	Santana (2–2)		28,113	25–21
47	May 27	Rangers	15–5	Burkett (4–3)	Person (0–3)		28,126	25–22
48	May 28	Yankees	6–4	Wells (5–3)	Guzmán (3–5)	Rivera (15)	32,338	25–23
49	May 29	Yankees	4–0	Cone (6–3)	Williams (1–5)	Nelson (1)	43,155	25–24
50	May 30	@ Athletics	12–7	Prieto (4–3)	Hentgen (5–2)		11,004	25–25
51	May 31	@ Athletics	13–3	Clemens (10–0)	Telgheder (1–3)		15,027	26–25

June: 11–15 (Home: 5–11; Away: 6–4)

#	Date	Opponent	Score	Win	Loss	Save	Attendance	Record
52	June 1	@ Athletics	8–2	Oquist (1–1)	Person (0–4)		21,127	26–26
53	June 2	@ Mariners	3–0	Johnson (8–1)	Andújar (0–1)		40,312	26–27
54	June 3	@ Mariners	6–3	Moyer (5–2)	Williams (1–6)		28,786	26–28
55	June 5	Athletics	4–3	Reyes (1–0)	Hentgen (5–3)	Taylor (10)	30,189	26–29
56	June 6	Athletics	4–1	Clemens (11–0)	Oquist (1–2)	Quantrill (2)	32,208	27–29
57	June 7	Athletics	3–1	Person (1–4)	Karsay (1–7)	Quantrill (3)	28,490	28–29
58	June 8	Athletics	7–5	Wengert (3–3)	Andújar (0–2)	Taylor (11)	29,404	28–30
59	June 10	Mariners	8–3	Hentgen (6–3)	Sanders (2–6)		33,124	29–30
60	June 11	Mariners	5–1	Fassero (6–2)	Clemens (11–1)		41,099	29–31
61	June 13	@ Phillies	4–3	Gomes (1–0)	Spoljaric (0–3)	Bottalico (14)	26,799	29–32
62	June 14	@ Phillies	3–2	Person (2–4)	Nye (0–2)	Quantrill (4)	22,582	30–32
63	June 15	@ Phillies	11–1	Hentgen (7–3)	Leiter (4–7)		30,516	31–32
64	June 16	Braves	3–0	Neagle (10–1)	Clemens (11–2)		34,409	31–33
65	June 17	Braves	8–7	Maddux (8–3)	Andújar (0–3)	Wohlers (14)	31,356	31–34
66	June 18	Braves	5–3	Williams (2–6)	Smoltz (6–6)	Timlin (6)	31,717	32–34
67	June 20	Orioles	3–0	Hentgen (8–3)	Mussina (8–2)		30,266	33–34
68	June 21	Orioles	5–1	Erickson (10–2)	Plesac (0–3)		40,139	33–35
69	June 22	Orioles	5–2	Kamieniecki (6–3)	Person (2–5)	Myers (25)	35,106	33–36
70	June 23	Red Sox	7–6	Sele (9–5)	Williams (2–7)	Slocumb (8)	30,380	33–37
71	June 24	Red Sox	9–6	Wasdin (2–3)	Andújar (0–4)	Slocumb (9)	27,263	33–38
72	June 25	Red Sox	13–12	Wakefield (3–7)	Hentgen (8–4)	Slocumb (10)	27,605	33–39
73	June 26	@ Orioles	3–0	Clemens (12–2)	Erickson (10–3)	Timlin (7)	47,617	34–39
74	June 27	@ Orioles	2–1	Person (3–5)	Kamieniecki (6–4)	Spoljaric (2)	47,900	35–39
75	June 28	@ Orioles	5–2	Williams (3–7)	Key (11–4)	Timlin (8)	47,687	36–39
76	June 29	@ Orioles	3–2	Escobar (1–0)	Benítez (0–3)	Timlin (9)	47,763	37–39
77	June 30	Expos	2–1	Martínez (10–3)	Hentgen (8–5)		37,430	37–40

July: 13–15 (Home: 8–4; Away: 5–11)

#	Date	Opponent	Score	Win	Loss	Save	Attendance	Record
78	July 1	Expos	2–1	Juden (10–2)	Clemens (12–3)	Urbina (15)	50,436	37–41
79	July 2	Expos	7–6 (13)	Timlin (2–0)	Telford (2–2)		34,176	38–41
80	July 3	Yankees	3–1	Wells (9–4)	Williams (3–8)	Rivera (27)	31,227	38–42
81	July 4	Yankees	1–0	Escobar (2–0)	Cone (8–4)		34,134	39–42
82	July 5	Yankees	8–0	Pettitte (9–5)	Hentgen (8–6)		44,206	39–43
83	July 6	Yankees	2–0	Clemens (13–3)	Mendoza (3–4)		41,137	40–43
84	July 10	@ Red Sox	8–7 (11)	Eshelman (3–3)	Timlin (2–1)		30,913	40–44
85	July 11	@ Red Sox	8–4	Hentgen (9–6)	Wasdin (3–4)		32,543	41–44
86	July 12	@ Red Sox	3–1	Clemens (14–3)	Sele (10–7)	Spoljaric (3)	33,106	42–44
87	July 13	@ Red Sox	3–2	Williams (4–8)	Wakefield (3–10)	Escobar (1)	32,418	43–44
88	July 14	@ Orioles	9–5	Mathews (2–1)	Person (3–6)		47,042	43–45
89	July 15	@ Orioles	8–4	Boskie (5–3)	Guzmán (3–6)		47,062	43–46
90	July 16	@ Rangers	6–0	Oliver (6–9)	Hentgen (9–7)		45,313	43–47
91	July 17	@ Rangers	9–1	Clemens (15–3)	Burkett (7–8)		46,239	44–47
92	July 18	@ Angels	2–1	Williams (5–8)	Watson (8–6)	Escobar (2)	26,087	45–47
93	July 19	@ Angels	5–4	Percival (4–4)	Timlin (2–2)		28,288	45–48
94	July 20	@ Angels	9–5	Finley (8–6)	Andújar (0–5)		19,671	45–49
95	July 22	Brewers	5–2	Hentgen (10–7)	Eldred (9–10)	Escobar (3)	33,181	46–49
96	July 23	Brewers	8–0	Clemens (16–3)	McAndrew (1–1)		31,580	47–49
97	July 24	Brewers	5–4	Williams (6–8)	Mercedes (3–6)	Escobar (4)	30,114	48–49
98	July 25	Royals	2–1	Person (4–6)	Rusch (3–6)	Escobar (5)	31,308	49–49
99	July 26	Royals	6–5	Timlin (3–2)	Carrasco (0–1)		34,133	50–49
100	July 27	Royals	3–2	Olson (1–0)	Quantrill (4–3)		32,341	50–50
101	July 28	@ Brewers	1–0	Woodard (1–0)	Clemens (16–4)	Fetters (3)		50–51
102	July 28	@ Brewers	9–3	Adamson (3–1)	Flener (0–1)		18,034	50–52
103	July 29	@ Brewers	2–0	Mercedes (4–6)	Williams (6–9)	Fetters (4)	22,549	50–53
104	July 29	@ Brewers	4–2	Karl (6–10)	Carpenter (0–3)	Fetters (5)	12,237	50–54
105	July 31	@ Tigers	4–2	Thompson (9–8)	Person (4–7)	Jones (19)	16,294	50–55

August: 15–15 (Home: 8–6; Away: 7–9)

#	Date	Opponent	Score	Win	Loss	Save	Attendance	Record
106	August 1	@ Tigers	7–5	Hentgen (11–7)	Miceli (2–2)	Escobar (6)	23,682	51–55
107	August 2	@ Tigers	8–7	Brocail (3–4)	Quantrill (4–4)	Jones (20)	22,254	51–56
108	August 3	@ Tigers	5–2	Blair (11–4)	Williams (6–10)	Jones (21)	27,848	51–57
109	August 4	@ Twins	9–3	Radke (16–5)	Carpenter (0–4)		19,018	51–58
110	August 5	@ Twins	8–3	Person (5–7)	Miller (0–2)		17,920	52–58
111	August 6	Indians	6–3	Hentgen (12–7)	Lopez (3–5)	Escobar (7)	36,463	53–58
112	August 7	Indians	4–0	Clemens (17–4)	Smiley (1–1)		35,194	54–58
113	August 8	Tigers	6–3	Williams (7–10)	Blair (11–5)	Escobar (8)	30,228	55–58
114	August 9	Tigers	3–2	Sanders (4–9)	Carpenter (0–5)	Jones (23)	37,166	55–59
115	August 10	Tigers	4–2	Thompson (11–8)	Person (5–8)		32,354	55–60
116	August 11	Tigers	8–2	Hentgen (13–7)	Jarvis (0–2)		30,105	56–60
117	August 12	Twins	9–1	Clemens (18–4)	Bowers (0–2)		33,108	57–60
118	August 13	Twins	3–2	Quantrill (5–4)	Trombley (1–2)		31,292	58–60
119	August 15	@ Indians	5–4 (10)	Assenmacher (4–0)	Crabtree (2–3)		43,011	58–61
120	August 16	@ Indians	8–4	Shuey (3–1)	Quantrill (5–5)		42,908	58–62
121	August 17	@ Indians	10–5	Clemens (19–4)	Wright (3–2)		42,861	59–62
122	August 18	@ Indians	5–3	Hershiser (11–5)	Williams (7–11)	Mesa (6)	42,471	59–63
123	August 19	@ White Sox	6–5	Carpenter (1–5)	Cruz (0–1)	Escobar (9)		60–63
124	August 19	@ White Sox	5–3	Bere (1–0)	Andújar (0–6)	Karchner (7)	19,643	60–64
125	August 20	@ White Sox	12–6	Baldwin (9–13)	Person (5–9)		20,003	60–65
126	August 21	@ White Sox	6–3	Drabek (10–8)	Hentgen (13–8)	Karchner (8)	20,120	60–66
127	August 22	@ Royals	5–3	Clemens (20–4)	Rosado (8–10)	Escobar (10)	29,604	61–66
128	August 23	@ Royals	6–5	Janzen (1–0)	Walker (3–3)	Quantrill (5)	19,249	62–66
129	August 24	@ Royals	11–8 (13)	Crabtree (3–3)	Casian (0–2)		14,434	63–66
130	August 26	White Sox	8–5	Baldwin (10–13)	Williams (7–12)	Karchner (10)	31,198	63–67
131	August 27	White Sox	13–2	Hentgen (14–8)	Drabek (10–9)		30,219	64–67
132	August 28	White Sox	3–2 (11)	Quantrill (6–5)	McElroy (0–3)		36,181	65–67
133	August 29	Marlins	8–0	Leiter (9–9)	Person (5–10)		29,223	65–68
134	August 30	Marlins	4–1	Fernandez (17–9)	Carpenter (1–6)	Nen (32)	35,229	65–69
135	August 31	Marlins	8–3	Hernández (9–0)	Williams (7–13)		31,125	65–70

September: 11–16 (Home: 9–3; Away: 2–13)

#	Date	Opponent	Score	Win	Loss	Save	Attendance	Record
136	September 1	@ Mets	3–0	Isringhausen (2–0)	Hentgen (14–9)	Franco (34)	19,196	65–71
137	September 2	@ Mets	8–5	Acevedo (2–1)	Clemens (20–5)	Wendell (5)	17,635	65–72
138	September 3	@ Mets	4–2	Mlicki (7–10)	Quantrill (6–6)	Franco (35)	14,513	65–73
139	September 4	Rangers	6–2	Helling (2–1)	Carpenter (1–7)		26,178	65–74
140	September 5	Rangers	5–1	Williams (8–13)	Pavlik (2–4)		27,121	66–74
141	September 6	Rangers	2–1	Hentgen (15–9)	Burkett (7–12)	Escobar (11)	31,232	67–74
142	September 7	Rangers	4–0	Clemens (21–5)	Oliver (11–11)		30,212	68–74
143	September 8	Angels	12–10	Plesac (1–3)	James (4–5)	Escobar (12)	25,775	69–74
144	September 9	Angels	2–0	Carpenter (2–7)	Hill (7–12)		25,674	70–74
145	September 10	@ Athletics	3–2	Mathews (5–2)	Plesac (1–4)		4,764	70–75
146	September 11	@ Athletics	8–7	Mathews (6–2)	Escobar (2–1)		6,135	70–76
147	September 12	@ Mariners	7–3	Ayala (10–4)	Clemens (21–6)		37,044	70–77
148	September 13	@ Mariners	6–3	Escobar (3–1)	Ayala (10–5)		51,631	71–77
149	September 14	@ Mariners	3–2	Timlin (6–4)	Risley (0–1)	Slocumb (24)	45,477	71–78
150	September 15	@ Mariners	7–3	Cloude (3–2)	Williams (8–14)	Slocumb (25)	41,684	71–79
151	September 17	@ Red Sox	4–3	Mahay (3–0)	Quantrill (6–7)	Gordon (9)	23,648	71–80
152	September 18	@ Red Sox	3–2	Corsi (4–2)	Escobar (3–2)		27,990	71–81
153	September 19	@ Yankees	3–0	Daal (1–0)	Gooden (8–5)	Escobar (13)	31,195	72–81
154	September 20	@ Yankees	4–3 (11)	Banks (3–0)	Janzen (1–1)		38,332	72–82
155	September 21	@ Yankees	5–4 (10)	Boehringer (3–2)	Almanzar (0–1)		40,038	72–83
156	September 22	@ Yankees	8–1	Wells (15–10)	Hentgen (15–10)		23,380	72–84
157	September 23	Orioles	3–2	Rodríguez (2–1)	Clemens (21–7)	Myers (44)	29,276	72–85
158	September 24	Orioles	9–3	Kamieniecki (10–6)	Daal (1–1)		27,443	72–86
159	September 25	Orioles	4–3	Carpenter (3–7)	Mussina (15–8)	Escobar (14)	28,324	73–86
160	September 26	Red Sox	3–0	Williams (9–14)	Henry (7–3)		34,155	74–86
161	September 27	Red Sox	12–5	Janzen (2–1)	Corsi (5–3)		37,401	75–86
162	September 28	Red Sox	3–2	Plesac (2–4)	Gordon (6–10)		40,251	76–86

== Player stats ==
= Indicates team leader

=== Batting ===
Note: Pos = Position; G = Games played; AB = At bats; H = Hits; HR = Home runs; RBI = Runs batted in; Avg. = Batting average

Pos	Player	G	AB	H	HR	RBI	Avg.
C	Benito Santiago	97	341	83	13	42	.243
1B	Carlos Delgado	153	519	136	30	91	.262
2B	Carlos García	103	350	77	3	23	.220
3B	Ed Sprague Jr.	138	504	115	14	48	.228
SS	Alex Gonzalez	126	426	102	12	35	.239
LF	José Cruz Jr.	55	212	49	14	34	.231
CF	Otis Nixon	103	401	105	1	26	.262
RF	Orlando Merced	98	368	98	9	40	.266
DH	Joe Carter	157	612	143	21	102	.234

==== Other batters ====
Note: G = Games; AB = At bats; H = Hits; HR = Home runs; RBI = Runs batted in; Avg. = Batting average

Player	G	AB	H	HR	RBI	Avg.
Shawn Green	135	429	123	16	53	.287
Charlie O'Brien	69	225	49	4	27	.218
Jacob Brumfield	58	174	36	2	20	.207
Shannon Stewart	44	168	48	0	22	.286
Mariano Duncan	39	167	38	0	12	.228
Tilson Brito	49	126	28	0	8	.222
Tomás Pérez	40	123	24	0	9	.195
Juan Samuel	45	95	27	3	15	.284
Robert Pérez	37	78	15	2	6	.192
Rubén Sierra	14	48	10	1	5	.208
Tom Evans	12	38	11	1	2	.289
Felipe Crespo	12	28	8	1	5	.286
Rich Butler	7	14	4	0	2	.286
Julio Mosquera	3	8	2	0	0	.250
Sandy Martínez	3	2	0	0	0	.000

=== Starting pitchers ===
= Indicates league leader

Note: G = Games pitched; IP = Innings pitched; W = Wins; L = Losses; ERA = Earned run average; SO = Strikeouts

Player	G	IP	W	L	ERA	SO
Pat Hentgen	35	264.0	15	10	3.68	160
Roger Clemens	34	264.0	21	7	2.05	292
Woody Williams	31	194.2	9	14	4.35	124
Robert Person	23	128.1	5	10	5.61	99
Chris Carpenter	14	81.1	3	7	5.09	55
Juan Guzmán	13	60.0	3	6	4.95	52

==== Other pitchers ====
Note: G = Games; IP = Innings pitched; W = Wins; L = Losses; ERA = Earned run average; SO = Strikeouts

Player	G	IP	W	L	ERA	SO
Luis Andújar	17	50.0	0	6	6.48	28
Omar Daal	9	27.0	1	1	4.00	28
Huck Flener	8	17.1	0	1	9.87	9
Erik Hanson	3	15.0	0	0	7.80	18

===== Relief pitchers =====
Note: G = Games pitched; W = Wins; L = Losses; SV = Saves; ERA = Earned run average; SO = Strikeouts

Player	G	W	L	SV	ERA	SO
Kelvim Escobar	27	3	2	14	2.90	36
Paul Quantrill	77	6	7	5	1.94	56
Dan Plesac	73	2	4	1	3.58	61
Mike Timlin	38	3	2	9	2.87	36
Paul Spoljaric	37	0	3	3	3.19	43
Tim Crabtree	37	3	3	2	7.08	26
Marty Janzen	12	2	1	0	3.60	17
Carlos Almanzar	4	0	1	0	2.70	4
Bill Risley	3	0	1	0	8.31	2
Kenny Robinson	3	0	0	0	2.70	4

== Award winners ==
- Roger Clemens, Pitcher of the Month Award, May
- Roger Clemens, Pitcher of the Month Award, August
- Roger Clemens, Cy Young Award
- Roger Clemens, MLB Leader, 21 Wins
- Roger Clemens, AL Strikeout Crown, 292 Strikeouts
- Roger Clemens, AL ERA Crown, 2.05
- Roger Clemens, American League Leader, Complete Games (9)
- Roger Clemens, American League Leader, Shutouts (3)
- Roger Clemens, American League Leader, Innings Pitched (264)

All-Star Game

- Roger Clemens, P
- Pat Hentgen, P

== Farm system ==
Level	Team	League	Manager
AAA	Syracuse SkyChiefs	International League	Garth Iorg
AA	Knoxville Smokies	Southern League	Omar Malavé
A	Dunedin Blue Jays	Florida State League	Dennis Holmberg
A	Hagerstown Suns	South Atlantic League	J. J. Cannon
A-Short Season	St. Catharines Stompers	New York–Penn League	Rocket Wheeler
Rookie	Medicine Hat Blue Jays	Pioneer League	Marty Pevey
