= 1997 Seattle Mariners season =

1997 Seattle Mariners
- American League West champions
- League: American League
- Division: West
- Ballpark: Kingdome
- City: Seattle, Washington
- Record: 90–72 (.556)
- Divisional place: 1st
- Owners: Hiroshi Yamauchi (represented by John Ellis)
- General managers: Woody Woodward
- Managers: Lou Piniella
- Television: KIRO-TV 7 Fox Sports Northwest
- Radio: KIRO 710 AM (Dave Niehaus, Chip Caray, Rick Rizzs, Ron Fairly, Dave Valle, Dave Henderson)

The Seattle Mariners 1997 season was their 21st season, and the team won their second American League West title, with a record of 90–72 (.556), six games ahead of the runner-up Anaheim Angels. For the second straight year, they led the AL in runs scored (925) and shattered the all-time record for most home runs hit by a team in one season (set at 257 by the Baltimore Orioles the year before) with 264. Five Mariners scored at least 100 runs and six hit at least 20 home runs. In addition, the Seattle pitching staff led the league with 1,207 strikeouts. In the postseason, the Mariners lost the ALDS to the Baltimore Orioles in 4 games.

The Mariners drew over three million in home attendance for the first time in franchise history, in the penultimate full season at the Kingdome. Ken Griffey Jr. hit a franchise record 56 home runs and won the Most Valuable Player award in the American League. This would be Randy Johnson's final full year in a Mariners uniform, as he would later be traded to Houston midway through the 1998 season.

== Offseason ==
- October 3, 1996: Ricky Jordan was released by the Mariners.
- November 12, 1996: Jalal Leach was signed as a free agent with the Mariners.
- November 15, 1996: Dave Silvestri was selected off waivers by the Mariners from the Montreal Expos.
- December 21, 1996: Josías Manzanillo was signed as a free agent with the Mariners.
- January 10, 1997: Brent Mayne was signed as a free agent with the Mariners.
- January 22, 1997: Rob Ducey was signed as a free agent with the Mariners.
- January 24, 1997: Mike Blowers was signed as a free agent with the Mariners.
- February 20, 1997: Dennis Martínez was signed as a free agent with the Mariners.
- March 27, 1997: Dave Silvestri was selected off waivers by the Texas Rangers from the Mariners.
- March 28, 1997: Brent Mayne was released by the Mariners.

== Regular season ==
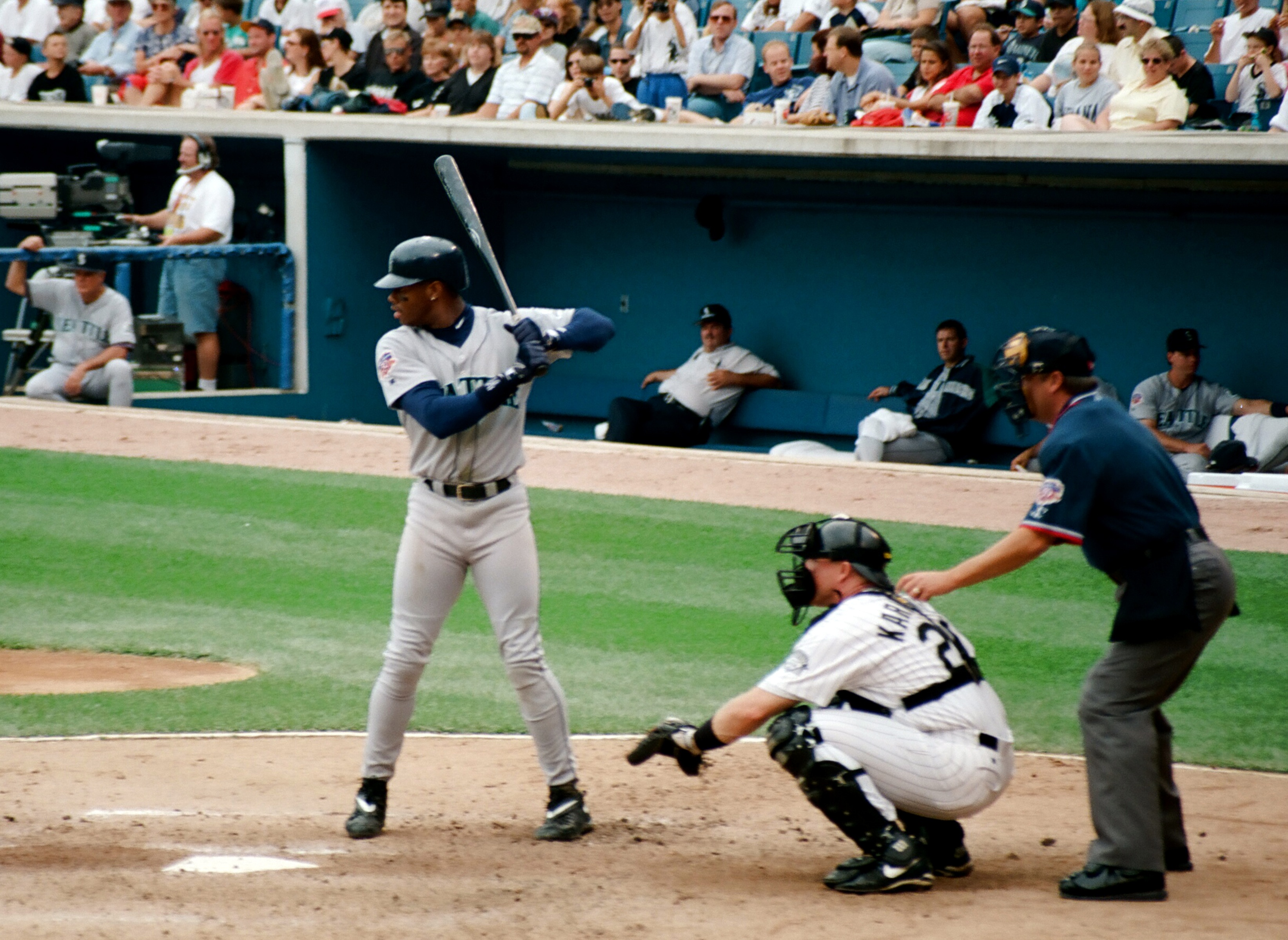
Ken Griffey Jr., pictured in August 1997, won the Most Valuable Player award in 1997

In 1997, Randy Johnson set an American League record for left-handers by striking out 19 batters in a 4–1 loss to the Oakland A's on June 24. On August 8 he matched the feat by setting down 19 Chicago White Sox. Johnson posted a 20–4 record with 291 strikeouts and an ERA of 2.28. He finished second in the Cy Young balloting to Toronto's Roger Clemens.

=== Opening Day starters ===
- Jay Buhner
- Joey Cora
- Russ Davis
- Jeff Fassero
- Ken Griffey Jr.
- Edgar Martínez
- Alex Rodriguez
- Paul Sorrento
- Lee Tinsley
- Dan Wilson

=== Season standings ===
AL West
Team	W	L	Pct.	GB	Home	Road
Seattle Mariners	90	72	.556	—	45‍–‍36	45‍–‍36
Anaheim Angels	84	78	.519	6	46‍–‍36	38‍–‍42
Texas Rangers	77	85	.475	13	39‍–‍42	38‍–‍43
Oakland Athletics	65	97	.401	25	35‍–‍46	30‍–‍51

=== Record vs. opponents ===
1997 American League record Source: MLB Standings Grid – 1997
Team	ANA	BAL	BOS	CWS	CLE	DET	KC	MIL	MIN	NYY	OAK	SEA	TEX	TOR	NL
Anaheim	—	4–7	6–5	6–5	7–4	5–6	6–5	7–4	4–7	4–7	11–1	6–6	8–4	6–5	4–12
Baltimore	7–4	—	5–7	5–6	6–5	6–6	7–4	5–6	10–1	8–4	8–3	7–4	10–1	6–6	8–7
Boston	5–6	7–5	—	3–8	6–5	5–7	3–8	8–3	8–3	4–8	7–4	7–4	3–8	6–6	6–9
Chicago	5–6	6–5	8–3	—	5–7	4–7	11–1	4–7	6–6	2–9	8–3	5–6	3–8	5–6	8–7
Cleveland	4–7	5–6	5–6	7–5	—	6–5	8–3	8–4	8–4	5–6	7–4	3–8	5–6	6–5	9–6
Detroit	6–5	6–6	7–5	7–4	5–6	—	6–5	4–7	4–7	2–10	7–4	4–7	7–4	6–6	8–7
Kansas City	5–6	4–7	8–3	1–11	3–8	5–6	—	6–6	7–5	3–8	3–8	5–6	6–5	5–6	6–9
Milwaukee	4–7	6–5	3–8	7–4	4–8	7–4	6–6	—	5–7	4–7	5–6	5–6	7–4	7–4	8–7
Minnesota	7–4	1–10	3–8	6–6	4–8	7–4	5–7	7–5	—	3–8	7–4	5–6	3–8	3–8	7–8
New York	7–4	4–8	8–4	9–2	6–5	10–2	8–3	7–4	8–3	—	6–5	4–7	7–4	7–5	5–10
Oakland	1–11	3–8	4–7	3–8	4–7	4–7	8–3	6–5	4–7	5–6	—	5–7	5–7	6–5	7–9
Seattle	6–6	4–7	4–7	6–5	8–3	7–4	6–5	6–5	6–5	7–4	7–5	—	8–4	8–3	7–9
Texas	4–8	1–10	8–3	8–3	6–5	4–7	5–6	4–7	8–3	4–7	7–5	4–8	—	4–7	10–6
Toronto	5–6	6–6	6–6	6–5	5–6	6–6	6–5	4–7	8–3	5–7	5–6	3–8	7–4	—	4–11

=== Notable transactions ===
- April 8, 1997: Steve Decker was signed as a free agent with the Seattle Mariners.
- May 24, 1997: Dennis Martínez was released by the Seattle Mariners.
- July 17, 1997: Josías Manzanillo was released by the Seattle Mariners.
- July 31, 1997: Heathcliff Slocumb was traded by the Boston Red Sox to the Seattle Mariners for Derek Lowe and Jason Varitek.
- July 31, 1997: Paul Spoljaric was traded by the Toronto Blue Jays with Mike Timlin to the Seattle Mariners for Jose Cruz.
- August 20, 1997: Roberto Kelly was traded by the Minnesota Twins to the Seattle Mariners for players to be named later. The Seattle Mariners sent Joe Mays (October 9, 1997) and Jeromy Palki (minors) (October 9, 1997) to the Minnesota Twins to complete the trade.
- September 2, 1997: Steve Decker was released by the Seattle Mariners.

=== Roster ===
1997 Seattle Mariners
Roster
Pitchers: 31 Bobby Ayala; 22 Rafael Carmona; 37 Norm Charlton; 27 Ken Cloude; 47 Tim Davis; 13 Jeff Fassero; 59 Mark Holzemer; 39 Edwin Hurtado; 51 Randy Johnson; 41 Felipe Lira; 36 Derek Lowe; 20 Mike Maddux; 41 Josías Manzanillo; 32 Dennis Martínez; 40 Greg McCarthy; 50 Jamie Moyer; 26 Omar Olivares; 23 Scott Sanders; 52 Heathcliff Slocumb; 23 Paul Spoljaric; 40 Mike Timlin; 38 Salomón Torres; 46 Bob Wells; 33 Bob Wolcott	Catchers: 17 John Marzano; 43 Rick Wilkins; 6 Dan Wilson; Infielders: 16 Mike Blowers; 28 Joey Cora; 18 Russ Davis; 26 Álvaro Espinoza; 9 Brent Gates; 34 Giomar Guevara; 11 Edgar Martínez; 30 Brian Raabe; 3 Alex Rodriguez; 35 Dan Rohrmeier; 12 Andy Sheets; 44 Paul Sorrento	Outfielders: 8 Rich Amaral; 19 Jay Buhner; 23 José Cruz Jr.; 29 Rob Ducey; 24 Ken Griffey Jr.; 38 Raúl Ibañez; 10 Roberto Kelly; 5 Lee Tinsley	Manager: 14 Lou Piniella; Coaches: 54 Nardi Contreras; 4 Lee Elia; 7 John McLaren; 49 Sam Mejías; 2 Steve Smith; 15 Matt Sinatro

== Player stats ==
=== Batting ===
==== Starters by position ====
Note: Pos = Position; G = Games played; AB = At bats; H = Hits; Avg. = Batting average; HR = Home runs; RBI = Runs batted in

Pos	Player	G	AB	H	Avg.	HR	RBI
C	Dan Wilson	146	508	137	.270	15	74
1B	Paul Sorrento	146	457	123	.269	31	80
2B	Joey Cora	149	574	172	.300	11	54
SS	Alex Rodriguez	141	587	176	.300	23	84
3B	Russ Davis	119	420	114	.271	20	63
LF	José Cruz Jr.	49	183	49	.268	12	34
CF	Ken Griffey Jr.	157	608	185	.304	56	147
RF	Jay Buhner	157	540	131	.243	40	109
DH	Edgar Martínez	155	542	179	.330	28	108

==== Other batters ====
Note: G = Games played; AB = At bats; H = Hits; Avg. = Batting average; HR = Home runs; RBI = Runs batted in

Player	G	AB	H	Avg.	HR	RBI
Rich Amaral	89	190	54	.284	1	21
Brent Gates	65	151	36	.238	3	20
Mike Blowers	68	150	44	.293	5	20
Rob Ducey	76	143	41	.287	5	10
Lee Tinsley	49	122	24	.197	0	6
Roberto Kelly	30	121	36	.298	7	22
Andy Sheets	32	89	22	.247	4	9
John Marzano	39	87	25	.287	1	10
Álvaro Espinoza	33	72	13	.181	0	7
Raúl Ibañez	11	26	4	.154	1	4
Rick Wilkins	5	12	3	.250	1	4
Dan Rohrmeier	7	9	3	.333	0	2
Giomar Guevara	5	4	0	.000	0	0
Brian Raabe	2	3	0	.000	0	0

=== Pitching ===
==== Starting pitchers ====
Note: G = Games pitched; IP = Innings pitched; W = Wins; L = Losses; ERA = Earned run average; SO = Strikeouts

Player	G	IP	W	L	ERA	SO
Jeff Fassero	35	234.1	16	9	3.61	189
Randy Johnson	30	213.0	20	4	2.28	291
Jamie Moyer	30	188.2	17	5	3.86	113
Bob Wolcott	19	100.0	5	6	6.03	58
Omar Olivares	13	62.1	1	4	5.49	29
Ken Cloude	10	51.0	4	2	5.12	46
Dennis Martínez	9	49.0	1	5	7.71	17

==== Other pitchers ====
Note: G = Games pitched; IP = Innings pitched; W = Wins; L = Losses; ERA = Earned run average; SO = Strikeouts

Player	G	IP	W	L	ERA	SO
Scott Sanders	33	65.1	3	6	6.47	62
Derek Lowe	12	53.0	2	4	6.96	39
Felipe Lira	8	18.2	0	4	9.16	9

==== Relief pitchers ====
Note: G = Games pitched; W = Wins; L = Losses; SV = Saves; ERA = Earned run average; SO = Strikeouts

Player	G	W	L	SV	ERA	SO
Norm Charlton	71	3	8	14	7.27	55
Bobby Ayala	71	10	5	8	3.82	92
Bob Wells	46	2	0	2	5.75	51
Greg McCarthy	37	1	1	0	5.46	34
Heathcliff Slocumb	27	0	4	10	4.13	28
Mike Timlin	26	3	2	1	3.86	9
Paul Spoljaric	20	0	0	0	4.76	27
Josías Manzanillo	16	0	1	0	5.40	18
Mark Holzemer	14	0	0	1	6.00	7
Edwin Hurtado	13	1	2	0	9.00	10
Mike Maddux	6	1	0	0	10.13	7
Rafael Carmona	4	0	0	0	3.18	6
Tim Davis	2	0	0	0	6.75	10
Salomón Torres	2	0	0	0	27.00	0

== ALDS ==
=== Game 1 ===
October 1, Kingdome

Team	1	2	3	4	5	6	7	8	9	R	H	E
Baltimore	0	0	1	0	4	4	0	0	0	9	13	0
Seattle	0	0	0	1	0	0	1	0	1	3	7	1
W: Mike Mussina (1-0) L: Randy Johnson (0-1) SV: None
HR: BAL – Gerónimo Berroa (1) Chris Hoiles (1) SEA – Edgar Martínez (1) Jay Buhner (1) Alex Rodriguez (1)

=== Game 2 ===
October 2, Kingdome

Team	1	2	3	4	5	6	7	8	9	R	H	E
Baltimore	0	1	0	0	2	0	2	4	0	9	14	0
Seattle	2	0	0	0	0	0	1	0	0	3	9	0
W: Scott Erickson (1-0) L: Jamie Moyer (0-1) SV: None
HR: BAL – Harold Baines (1) Brady Anderson (1) SEA – None

=== Game 3 ===
October 4, Oriole Park at Camden Yards

Team	1	2	3	4	5	6	7	8	9	R	H	E
Seattle	0	0	1	0	1	0	0	0	2	4	11	0
Baltimore	0	0	0	0	0	0	0	0	2	2	5	0
W: Jeff Fassero (1-0) L: Jimmy Key (0-1) SV: None
HR: BAL – None SEA – Jay Buhner (2) Paul Sorrento (1)

=== Game 4 ===
October 5, Oriole Park at Camden Yards

Team	1	2	3	4	5	6	7	8	9	R	H	E
Seattle	0	1	0	0	0	0	0	0	0	1	2	0
Baltimore	2	0	0	0	1	0	0	0	X	3	7	0
W: Mike Mussina (2-0) L: Randy Johnson (0-2) SV: Randy Myers (1)
HR: BAL – Jeff Reboulet (1) Gerónimo Berroa (2) SEA – Edgar Martínez (2)

== Awards and honors ==
- The Mariners led the American League in home runs with 264

== Farm system ==
Level	Team	League	Manager
AAA	Tacoma Rainiers	Pacific Coast League	Dave Myers
AA	Memphis Chicks	Southern League	Dave Brundage
A	Lancaster JetHawks	California League	Rick Burleson
A	Wisconsin Timber Rattlers	Midwest League	Gary Varsho
A-Short Season	Everett AquaSox	Northwest League	Orlando Gómez
Rookie	AZL Mariners	Arizona League	Darrin Garner
