= Mel Queen (pitcher/outfielder) =

American baseball player and manager (1942–2011)

- Pitcher / Outfielder / Manager
- Born: March 26, 1942; Johnson City, New York, U.S.
- Died: May 11, 2011 (aged 69); Morro Bay, California, U.S.
- Batted: Left Threw: Right

MLB debut
- April 13, 1964, for the Cincinnati Reds

Last MLB appearance
- July 21, 1972, for the California Angels

MLB statistics
- Win–loss record: 20–17
- Earned run average: 3.14
- Strikeouts: 306
- Stats at Baseball Reference

Teams
- As player: Cincinnati Reds (1964–1969); California Angels (1970–1972); As manager: Toronto Blue Jays (1997); As coach: Cleveland Indians (1982); Toronto Blue Jays (1996–1999)

Melvin Douglas Queen (March 26, 1942 – May 11, 2011) was an American professional baseball player, manager, coach, scout and executive. He played all or part of nine seasons as an outfielder and pitcher in Major League Baseball (MLB), and also served for four seasons as a pitching coach. He batted left-handed and threw right-handed.

== Early life ==
Queen's father, Melvin Joseph Queen (1918–1982), was a Major League pitcher for the New York Yankees and Pittsburgh Pirates for parts of eight seasons from 1942 to 1952. The younger Mel Queen was born in Johnson City, New York. The family moved to California in the early 1950s when his father was playing for the Hollywood Stars of the Pacific Coast League. He was signed to a bonus by the Reds after a stellar three-sport high school career at San Luis Obispo High School in San Luis Obispo, California, where he was a teammate of future Major League pitcher Jim Lonborg.

== Professional career ==
=== Cincinnati Reds ===
Queen started his minor league career as a third baseman with the Palatka Redlegs of the Florida State League. The following year, Queen led Three-I League third basemen with 228 assists while playing for the Topeka Reds. After spending 1962 with the Macon Peaches, Queen was converted into an outfielder in 1963 while with the San Diego Padres, at the time the Reds' Triple-A affiliate in the Pacific Coast League.

In 1964, Queen started the season with the major league Reds, making his MLB debut on Opening Day, April 13, as a pinch hitter in the sixth inning, lining out to center field off Houston Astros pitcher Ken Johnson. He got his first hit 11 days later with a single against the San Francisco Giants, off future Hall of Famer Juan Marichal. He spent the entire season with the Reds, appearing in 46 games and batting .200.

==== Conversion to pitching ====
After spending nearly all of 1965 back with the minor league Padres, appearing in only five games for the Reds, Queen returned to the majors full-time in 1966. It was this season that he was again converted, this time into a pitcher.

He made his pitching debut on July 15 against the St. Louis Cardinals, pitching the ninth inning of a blowout loss. Altogether, he appeared in 56 games for the Reds, 32 as an outfielder, seven as a pitcher, and the rest as a pinch-hitter. As a pitcher, he compiled a 6.43 earned run average in seven relief appearances for the Reds and did not have a decision.

Queen's most productive season came in 1967, when he posted a 14-8 record and a 2.76 ERA in 31 games, striking out 154 batters in a career-high 195.2 innings pitched, while allowing two or less earned runs in 15 of his 24 starts. His season highlights included a six-hit shutout against the San Francisco Giants in his first career start on April 16, and a two-hit shutout against the New York Mets on September 8.

Queen developed shoulder problems including a torn rotator cuff and missed most of the 1968 season, then spent much of 1969 in the minor leagues.

=== California Angels ===
Queen was purchased by the California Angels in October 1969. He appeared in 34 games in 1970, all but three in relief, posting a record of 3-6 and an ERA of 4.20 with nine saves. In 1971, he pitched in 44 games, all in relief, and posted a career-best 1.78 ERA. In 1972, he appeared in 17 games, posting a 4.35 ERA with no decisions, while spending part of the year back in the minor leagues. It was his last year as an active player.

=== Career overview ===
In a seven-season career, Queen went 20–17 with a 3.14 ERA and 14 saves in 140 games, giving up 154 runs (136 earned) on 336 hits and 143 walks while striking out 306 in 389.2 innings of work. As a pitcher, Queen relied almost entirely on his fastball.

"I just went to the mound and threw as hard as I could", he said in an interview.

Even after his conversion to pitching, he occasionally came off the bench to pinch-hit against right-handed pitchers, finishing his career with a collective .179 average with two home runs and 25 runs batted in through 269 games as a hitter.

== Coaching career ==
Following his playing career, Queen managed a friend's seafood restaurant and was thus able to spend more time with his wife Gail and their three children. Queen joined the Indians' organization in 1979 as a minor league pitching coach after former manager Dave Bristol recommended him, and had a stint on their major league staff in 1982. He later joined the Los Angeles Dodgers organization, serving as manager of the Bakersfield Dodgers in 1985.

In 1986, Queen joined the Toronto Blue Jays, where he would play a significant role in the development of the homegrown players during their 11 straight winning seasons. He started as a coach, being promoted as their farm director in 1990 and served as their major league pitching coach from 1996 through 1999. During his four seasons in that role, two Toronto hurlers won three consecutive Cy Young Awards as the top pitcher in the American League — Pat Hentgen in 1996 and Roger Clemens in the 1997 and 1998 seasons.

In addition, Queen was instrumental in helping shape the careers of a number of top Blue Jays players, to include pitchers Chris Carpenter, Pat Hentgen, Todd Stottlemyre, Mike Timlin, David Wells and Woody Williams; infielders Alex Gonzalez and Jeff Kent, as well as outfielders Shawn Green and Shannon Stewart, among some other notables.

Queen also served as the Blue Jays interim manager for the final five games of the 1997 season after Cito Gaston was let go, and later became a scout for the organization.

One of his major achievements came in 2000, when the Blue Jays coaxed him out of retirement to help revive the sagging career of Roy Halladay. Halladay had been a huge prospect, drafted in the first round and making his major league debut at age 21. In his third season, however, Halladay had become ineffective, pitching to a dreadful 10.64 ERA. With Halladay considering retirement, the Blue Jays sent him all the down to A Ball, and assigned Queen to work with him. The two met down in Dunedin, Florida, where the Jays had their A Ball affiliate. Queen ran a virtual boot camp for Halladay, rebuilding his delivery, teaching him new grips for his pitches, and helping him develop a new mental approach. Under Queen's tutelage, Halladay transformed from a thrower to a pitcher, and returned to the major leagues a dominant force, culminating with his election to the Baseball Hall of Fame in his first year of eligibility.

"There's no one I made that drastic a change to and verbally abused the way I did Doc", Queen explained after Halladay won his first Cy Young Award in 2003. "There aren’t many people that would have gone through what I put him through. I had to make him understand that he was very unintelligent about baseball. He had no idea about the game", he added.

In 2009, then Toronto's general manager J. P. Ricciardi brought Queen out of retirement again to serve as a senior advisor, working on special assignments with minor league pitchers, retaining that position for the rest of his life.

=== Managerial record ===
Team	Year	Regular season					Postseason			
Team	Year	Games	Won	Lost	Win %	Finish	Won	Lost	Win %	Result
TOR	1997	5	4	1	.800	5th in AL East	–	–	–	–
Total		5	4	1	.800		0	0	–	

== Personal life ==
Queen's brother-in-law was Jim Lonborg, whose sister Celia Queen married and with whom he had a son, Steven Queen. Lonborg had also been Queen's high school teammate. Lonborg pitched from 1965 to 1979 for the Boston Red Sox, Milwaukee Brewers and Philadelphia Phillies.

Mel Queen was a longtime resident of Morro Bay, California, where he died at age 69 on May 11, 2011, as a result of complications from cancer.

== See also ==
- List of second-generation Major League Baseball players
