= Andy Sheets =

American baseball player (born 1971)

- Shortstop
- Born: November 19, 1971 (age 54); Baton Rouge, Louisiana, U.S.
- Batted: Right Threw: Right

Professional debut
- MLB: April 22, 1996, for the Seattle Mariners
- NPB: March 28, 2003, for the Hiroshima Toyo Carp

Last appearance
- MLB: September 25, 2002, for the Tampa Bay Devil Rays
- NPB: October 14, 2007, for the Hanshin Tigers

MLB statistics
- Batting average: .216
- Home runs: 19
- Runs batted in: 113

NPB statistics
- Batting average: .289
- Home runs: 95
- Runs batted in: 374
- Stats at Baseball Reference

Teams
- Seattle Mariners (1996–1997); San Diego Padres (1998); Anaheim Angels (1999); Boston Red Sox (2000); Tampa Bay Devil Rays (2001–2002); Hiroshima Toyo Carp (2003–2004); Hanshin Tigers (2005–2007)

Andy Mark Sheets (born November 19, 1971) is an American former professional baseball player. Sheets played in Major League Baseball for the Seattle Mariners (1996–1997), San Diego Padres (1998), Anaheim Angels (1999), Boston Red Sox (2000) and Tampa Bay Devil Rays (2001–2002). He also played for the Hiroshima Toyo Carp (2003–2004), and Hanshin Tigers (2005–2007), of the Nippon Professional Baseball (NPB).

He is the cousin of pitcher Ben Sheets.

== Playing career ==
A native of Baton Rouge, Louisiana, Sheets attended Tulane University and Louisiana State University. In 1991, he played collegiate summer baseball with the Brewster Whitecaps of the Cape Cod Baseball League. He was selected by the Mariners in the 4th round of the 1992 MLB draft.

Sheets was part of the 1997 Mariners team that won the American League West division and the 1998 Padres that won the National League pennant. In 7 MLB seasons, he played in 356 games, batting .216 with 38 doubles, 3 triples, 19 home runs, 113 runs batted in and 16 stolen bases.

== Career stats ==
Year	Age	Team	Lg	G	AB	R	H	2B	3B	HR	RBI	SB	SO	BA	OBP	SLG	OPS
1996	24	Seattle Mariners	AL	47	110	18	21	8	0	0	9	2	41	.191	.262	.264	.526
1997	25	Seattle Mariners	AL	32	89	18	22	3	0	4	9	2	34	.247	.299	.416	.715
1998	26	San Diego Padres	NL	88	194	31	47	5	3	7	29	7	62	.242	.318	.407	.725
1999	27	Anaheim Angels	AL	87	244	22	48	10	0	3	29	1	59	.197	.236	.275	.510
2000	28	Boston Red Sox	AL	12	21	1	2	0	0	0	1	0	3	.095	.095	.095	.190
2001	29	Tampa Bay Devil Rays	AL	49	153	10	30	8	0	1	14	2	35	.196	.251	.268	.519
2002	30	Tampa Bay Devil Rays	AL	41	149	18	37	4	0	4	22	2	41	.248	.301	.356	.656
		Total		356	960	118	207	38	3	19	113	16	275				
