= Giomar Guevara =

Venezuelan baseball player (born 1972)

- Shortstop / Second baseman
- Born: October 23, 1972 (age 53); Guarenas, Miranda, Venezuela
- Batted: Both Threw: Right

MLB debut
- September 19, 1997, for the Seattle Mariners

Last MLB appearance
- April 27, 1999, for the Seattle Mariners

MLB statistics
- Batting average: .207
- Runs scored: 6
- Runs batted in: 2
- On-base percentage: .324
- Games played: 24
- Stats at Baseball Reference

Teams
- Seattle Mariners (1997–99)

Giomar Antonio Guevara Díaz (gay-VAH-rah; born October 23, 1972) is a Venezuelan former professional baseball infielder. He played parts of three seasons in Major League Baseball, from 1997 through 1999, for the Seattle Mariners. Listed at 5 ft 8 in (1.73 m), 150 pounds (68 kg), Guevara was a switch-hitter and threw right handed. He was born in Guarenas, Miranda.

== Career ==
Guevara signed with the Mariners as an international free agent in November 1990. He led his Dominican Summer League team with a .314 batting average in 1992. He was named the Mariners' minor league player of the month in April 1994 and played in the Midwest League All-Star Game that summer. In 1995, he was limited by visa problems related to the MLB players' strike and also dealt with injuries Baseball America ranked him as the team's eight best prospect ahead of the 1997 season.

Guevara played in 26 MLB for Seattle in parts of three seasons as the backup shortstop to Alex Rodriguez. He was a September call-up in 1997, batting 0-for-4. He tore the anterior cruciate ligament in his right knee that December and missed most of the 1998 season, though he collected his first MLB hit, an infield single off Kevin Appier on September 11. He was granted free agency after the 1999 season and signed with the Detroit Tigers, though he did not return to the majors. He played in Triple-A for the Tigers for two seasons, ending his playing career in the Oakland Athletics organization in 2002.

Guevara also played winter ball with the Leones del Caracas and Tigres de Aragua clubs of the Venezuelan League from 1993 to 2001.

After his playing career, Guevara coached for the Bluefield Orioles in 2006, Gulf Coast League Orioles in 2007 and 2008, and later youth baseball in Seattle.

== See also ==
- List of Major League Baseball players from Venezuela
