= Omar Daal =

Venezuelan baseball player (born 1972)

- Pitcher
- Born: March 1, 1972 (age 54); Maracaibo, Zulia State, Venezuela
- Batted: Left Threw: Left

MLB debut
- April 24, 1993, for the Los Angeles Dodgers

Last MLB appearance
- September 25, 2003, for the Baltimore Orioles

MLB statistics
- Win–loss record: 68–78
- Earned run average: 4.55
- Strikeouts: 806
- Stats at Baseball Reference

Teams
- Los Angeles Dodgers (1993–1995); Montreal Expos (1996–1997); Toronto Blue Jays (1997); Arizona Diamondbacks (1998–2000); Philadelphia Phillies (2000–2001); Los Angeles Dodgers (2002); Baltimore Orioles (2003)

Omar Jesús Daal Cordero (born March 1, 1972) is a Venezuelan former professional baseball pitcher, who played in Major League Baseball (MLB) for 11 seasons (1993–2003). He played for the Los Angeles Dodgers, Montreal Expos, Toronto Blue Jays, Arizona Diamondbacks, Philadelphia Phillies, and Baltimore Orioles.

== Career ==
Daal threw a deceptive fastball that rarely exceeded 85 MPH, a good changeup, and a decent curveball. When he had both control and command of his pitches, he could be difficult to hit.

Daal was somewhat of a two-career pitcher who began as a reliever for the Dodgers, Expos, and Blue Jays, between 1993 and 1997, then became a starter with the Diamondbacks in 1998. He had perhaps his finest year in 1999, setting career highs with 16 wins and 148 strikeouts in 214 2/3 innings.

Daal amassed 228 appearances as a relief pitcher but only recorded one save. It occurred on April 13, 1997. The Expos defeated the Rockies 8-3 and Daal pitched the final 2 2/3 innings to pick up the save. He allowed 2 hits and 0 earned runs to save the game for starting pitcher Carlos Perez.

In 2000, Daal led the big leagues in losses with 19.

On August 15, 2001, Daal combined with fellow Venezuelan pitchers Giovanni Carrara, Kelvim Escobar, and Freddy García for wins in their respective starts: Daal, in a Phillies victory over the Brewers, 8–6; Carrara, of the Dodgers, beating Montreal, 13–1; Escobar, of the Blue Jays, over Oakland, 5–2, and García, of Seattle, against the Red Sox, 6–2. This marked the first time in MLB history that four Venezuelan starting pitchers recorded a win on the same day.

Prior to the 2003 season, Daal signed a two-year contract with Baltimore; however, after undergoing arthroscopic surgery on his left shoulder in early 2004, he was out for that entire season — and would never appear in a major league game, again.

Daal's career stat line includes a win–loss record of 68–78, with 806 strikeouts, and a 4.55 earned run average (ERA), in 1,198 innings pitched.

Daal currently coaches two club baseball teams a 12u team and a 13u team, called the East Valley Scrapper's in Mesa, Arizona.

== See also ==
- List of Major League Baseball players from Venezuela

| Preceded by Andy Ashby | Philadelphia Phillies Opening Day; Starting Pitcher; 2001 | Succeeded by Robert Person |
