= Robert Person =

American baseball player (born 1969)

- Pitcher
- Born: October 6, 1969 (age 56); St. Louis, Missouri, U.S.
- Batted: Right Threw: Right

MLB debut
- September 18, 1995, for the New York Mets

Last MLB appearance
- June 7, 2003, for the Boston Red Sox

MLB statistics
- Win–loss record: 51–42
- Earned run average: 4.64
- Strikeouts: 773
- Stats at Baseball Reference

Teams
- New York Mets (1994–1996); Toronto Blue Jays (1997–1999); Philadelphia Phillies (1999–2002); Boston Red Sox (2003)

Robert Alan Person (born October 6, 1969) is an American former professional baseball pitcher who played nine seasons in Major League Baseball: two for the New York Mets, two and a half for the Toronto Blue Jays, three and a half for the Philadelphia Phillies, and only seven games pitched for the Boston Red Sox in the last year of his career.

== Career ==
Person grew up in University City, Missouri and started his college baseball career at Seminole State College in Oklahoma. He was an outfielder at Seminole until his coach bet the team's relief pitchers that he could find a position player on the roster who had a better arm than them. He chose Person and won the bet.

Person was drafted by the Cleveland Indians in the 25th round of the 1989 Major League Baseball draft and eventually traded to the Chicago White Sox in 1991. In the 1992 MLB expansion draft, the Florida Marlins drafted him 47th overall, he then became a free agent, and signed again with the Marlins.

In 1994, Person was traded from the Marlins to the New York Mets, who, in 1996, traded him to the Blue Jays for John Olerud. Person became a Phillie in 1999 when the Blue Jays swapped him for Paul Spoljaric. Granted free agency after the 2002 season, he joined the Red Sox for a short and unsuccessful stint.

Person tried joining the White Sox out of spring training in 2004 and 2005, but was unsuccessful. Injuries were the Achilles heel (quite literally), preventing Person from achieving sustained success.

Person's most memorable feat came with the Philadelphia Phillies on June 2, 2002. He not only threw five strong innings in which he allowed three hits and one unearned run while striking out five, but he also hit two home runs against the Montreal Expos. The first home run was a grand slam to left field off Bruce Chen with two outs in the first inning; the second was a three-run home run to left field off Masato Yoshii with one out in the fifth inning. In between those home runs, he came up again with the bases loaded and drove a ball far enough for a second slam, but it was foul and he ended up striking out.

Person's best season as a pitcher came in 2000 when he went 9-7 with a 3.63 ERA and 164 strikeouts in 173.1 1/3 innings. He posted 3.9 Wins Above Replacement, the best mark of his career.

Before Person's grand slam, Jeff Juden was the last Phillies pitcher to hit a grand slam: August 25, 1995, against the Los Angeles Dodgers. Randy Lerch had been the last Phillies pitcher before Person to hit two home runs in a game, a feat that he accomplished on September 30, 1978.

While in Philadelphia, Person had his own fan club named "Person's People".

Person played college baseball for the University of Arkansas. He played high school baseball at University City High School in St. Louis.

| Preceded by Omar Daal | Philadelphia Phillies Opening Day; Starting Pitcher; 2002 | Succeeded by Kevin Millwood |
