= Paul Spoljaric =

Canadian baseball player (born 1970)

- Pitcher
- Born: September 24, 1970 (age 55); Kelowna, British Columbia, Canada
- Batted: Right Threw: Left

MLB debut
- April 6, 1994, for the Toronto Blue Jays

Last MLB appearance
- September 28, 2000, for the Kansas City Royals

MLB statistics
- Win–loss record: 8–17
- Earned run average: 5.52
- Strikeouts: 278
- Stats at Baseball Reference

Teams
- Toronto Blue Jays (1994, 1996–1997); Seattle Mariners (1997–1998); Philadelphia Phillies (1999); Toronto Blue Jays (1999); Kansas City Royals (2000)

Paul Nikola Spoljaric (born September 24, 1970) is a Canadian former left-handed professional baseball pitcher. He played in Major League Baseball (MLB) for four teams from 1994 to 2000.

== Playing career ==
=== Major League Baseball ===
Spoljaric signed with the Toronto Blue Jays as an amateur free agent in August 1989. He was named the best prospect and most outstanding pitcher of the South Atlantic League in 1992. He debuted in MLB with the Blue Jays in 1994. He earned his fist save in April 1997, replacing Mike Timlin as Toronto's closer. That July, he was traded with Timlin to the Seattle Mariners for José Cruz Jr. He made his only postseason appearance that October, allowing all four inherited runners to score in two relief appearances in the American League Division Series.

Seattle traded Spoljaric to the Philadelphia Phillies after the 1998 season for Mark Leiter. After working as a starter, the Phillies returned Spoljaric to Toronto, trading him for Robert Person in May 1999. After the 1999 season, Spoljaric was included in a trade sending Pat Hentgen to the St. Louis Cardinals. However, St. Louis released him in March 2000. He signed with the Kansas City Royals and returned to the majors that May. He pitched in 16 games for the Royals, his last MLB action.

In his six-year MLB career, Spoljaric compiled an 8–17 record with 278 strikeouts, 4 saves, and a 5.52 ERA in 277 1/3 innings.

=== International career ===
Spoljaric was on the Canada national team at the 2004 Summer Olympics, where they finished in fourth place in the baseball tournament.

=== Intercounty Baseball League ===
Spoljaric was a starting pitcher in the Intercounty Baseball League (IBL) in Southern Ontario. Spoljaric also spent the first six IBL seasons as a starting pitcher with the Toronto Maple Leafs. With the Maple Leafs, he won IBL championships in 2002 and 2007.

After the 2007 season, Spoljaric signed with the Barrie Baycats. He said he chose to switch to Barrie because it was closer to home and he was annoyed with the Maple Leafs' owner. Spoljaric was one out away from a no-hitter in 2009. He retired after the 2010 season.

In 2020, surveyed IBL players said Spoljaric would be their first choice to induct into a league hall of fame. On July 13, 2025, Spoljaric's #36 was retired by the Maple Leafs.

== Personal life ==
After his major league career, Spoljaric became the owner of a flooring company in Bolton, Ontario.

Spoljaric and his wife have five children. Their son Garner pitched in college baseball for the Stetson Hatters and Embry–Riddle Eagles. Their son Turner pitched for the Oregon Ducks and Stetson. Both sons also pitched for the Baycats.
