= Pat Hentgen =

American baseball player (born 1968)

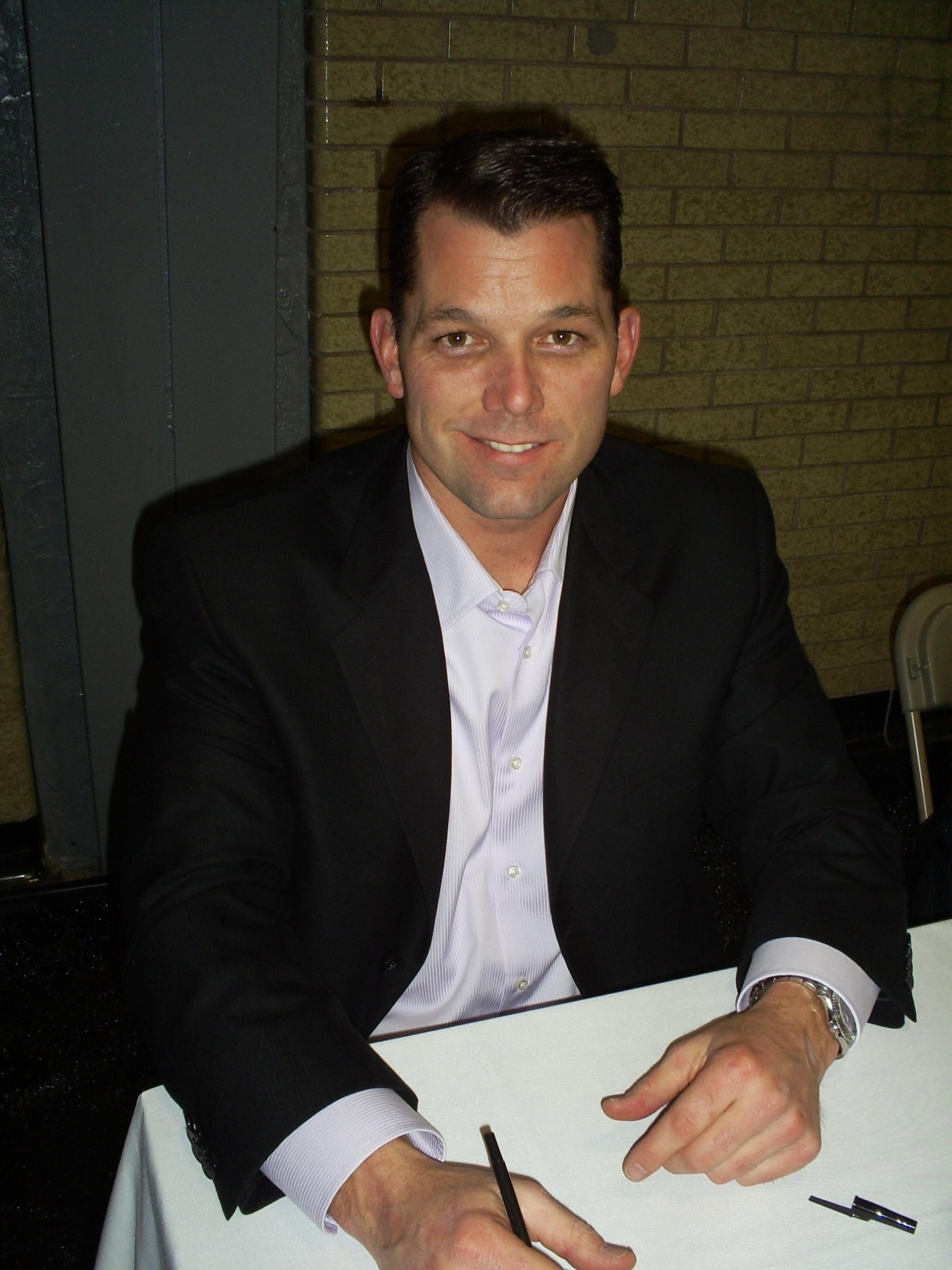
- Pitcher
- Born: November 13, 1968 (age 58); Detroit, Michigan, U.S.
- Batted: Right Threw: Right

MLB debut
- September 3, 1991, for the Toronto Blue Jays

Last MLB appearance
- July 21, 2004, for the Toronto Blue Jays

MLB statistics
- Win–loss record: 131–112
- Earned run average: 4.32
- Strikeouts: 1,290
- Stats at Baseball Reference

Teams
- Toronto Blue Jays (1991–1999); St. Louis Cardinals (2000); Baltimore Orioles (2001–2003); Toronto Blue Jays (2004)

Career highlights and awards
- 3× All-Star (1993, 1994, 1997); World Series champion (1993); AL Cy Young Award (1996)

Member of the Canadian

Baseball Hall of Fame
- Induction: 2016

Patrick George Hentgen (born November 13, 1968) is an American former professional baseball pitcher, and currently a special assistant with the Toronto Blue Jays organization. He played in Major League Baseball (MLB) for the Blue Jays, St. Louis Cardinals, and Baltimore Orioles from 1991 to 2004. In 1996, he won the American League (AL) Cy Young Award.

== Early life ==
Hentgen was born in Detroit, Michigan, in 1968. He attended Fraser High School in Fraser, Michigan, and was drafted by the Toronto Blue Jays in the fifth round of the 1986 Major League Baseball draft, aged 17. He signed with the Blue Jays in June 1986.

== Professional baseball career ==
=== Minor Leagues ===
After being drafted in 1986, Hentgen pitched with the St. Catharines Blue Jays at the Short-Season A level, putting up a 4.50 ERA over 40 innings. He struck out 30 batters, and walked 30 batters, leading to both a K/9 and BB/9 of 6.8. He also recorded one of only two saves in his professional career.

He spent 1987-1989 at the A-level, first with the Low-A Myrtle Beach Blue Jays in 1987, and then the High-A Dunedin Blue Jays between 1988-1989. In 1987, Hentgen performed very well, posting a 2.35 ERA over 188 innings, while maintaining his strikeout rate and greatly lowering his walk rate. In 1988, he recorded a 3.45 ERA over 151.1 innings but had 22 unearned runs. He won just 3 games that year and lost 12. He also noticeably raised his strikeout numbers, punching out 125 batters, although his walk numbers rose slightly as well. He threw 151.1 innings again in 1989, this time with a 2.68 ERA. His strikeouts increased greatly again, to 148, and his walks again rose slightly.

In 1990, Hentgen made it to the Double-A Knoxville Blue Jays. His numbers stayed consistent, throwing 153.1 innings with a 3.05 ERA, 142 strikeouts, and 68 walks. In 1991, he was promoted again to the Triple-A Syracuse Chiefs. In 171 innings in Syracuse, Hentgen's numbers worsened, putting up a 4.47 ERA with 90 walks and an 8-9 record. One stat that remained strong were his strikeouts, recording 155 and leading the International League. He was promoted to the Toronto Blue Jays at the end of the season as a september call-up. Hentgen was sent down a couple of times in 1992, making four starts with Syracuse in which he recorded 20.1 innings, a 2.66 ERA and 17 strikeouts.

Hentgen later returned to the minor leagues in 2002 while with the Baltimore Orioles. He threw 32.2 innings over six starts at five different levels in the Orioles organization, posting a 2.20 ERA.

=== Toronto Blue Jays (1991-1999) ===
==== 1991-1992 ====
Hentgen made his major league debut with the Blue Jays on September 3, 1991, throwing two innings against the Baltimore Orioles. He faced 8 batters, struck out one and walked two. He would throw 0.1 inning against the Minnesota Twins, allowing a run, before making his first start on the last day of the Blue Jays season in Minnesota, going 5 innings and allowing a run in a win.

Hentgen began the 1992 season in the Jays bullpen. His season began with a two inning hold against the Detroit Tigers on April 8. He operated mainly as a long reliever, often entering in middle innings and blowout games, with his longest relief outing being 4.2 scoreless innings against the Texas Rangers on June 29. His other outings over 2 innings were 2.2 scoreless innings against the Boston Red Sox, and 3.2 scoreless against the Seattle Mariners. He made 2 starts at the start of July, allowing 5 runs in 8 innings between them, although the second start lasted just one inning. Hentgen was sent down to Syracuse several times throughout the season, and on August 12, he was sidelined with a non-disclosed injury, after which he only appeared once more, causing him to miss the Blue Jays World Series win. Despite not playing in the 1992 World Series, he was awarded a ring.

Hentgen finished the 1992 season having pitched 50.1 innings with a 5.36 ERA. He pitched in 28 games with a 5-2 record, and also recorded a hold and a blown save. He struck out 39 batters, and his walk numbers rose dramatically from his minor league numbers, giving up 32 bases on balls. His 5.7 BB/9 was the highest in his major league career, and only beaten by his 6.8 BB/9 pitching in the minor leagues in 1986, however his 7 K/9 was also the second highest of his major league career.

==== 1993-1995 ====
Hentgen's first full season with Toronto, and first year as a full time starting pitcher, was in 1993. His first two appearances were from the bullpen, throwing 7.2 innings between the two. He would make his first start of the year on April 17 against the Cleveland Indians, going five scoreless innings. He won his first 4 starts, going 8 innings in two of them and never allowing more than 2 runs. His first loss as a starter (he had one as a reliever) in 1993 came after he allowed 7 runs in 3 innings to the Detroit Tigers, after which he threw 7 innings with 2 or less runs allowed in his next 2 games. He would record 4 consecutive wins again from June 13 to June 29, allowing 8 runs over 26 innings and throwing over 100 pitches in 3 of the 4 starts. He recorded his first career complete game on July 5 against the Chicago White Sox, allowing 4 runs on 118 pitches in a 4-3 loss. He would then allow 6 runs in 1.2 innings against the Texas Rangers in his final start before the All-Star Break.

He was selected for the All-Star Game by Blue Jays manager Cito Gaston, however he wouldn't pitch in the game, being told by Gaston beforehand he was being saved in case of extra innings. In his first start following the All-Star Game, Hentgen threw a complete game shutout against the Kansas City Royals. Hentgen was key for the Jays playoff push, throwing over 6 innings in every start he made between the All-Star Break and the end of September, including throwing over 7 innings in each start he made in August. He also threw at least 100 pitches in all but two games during this stretch. He threw his third complete game of the year on August 8, another loss to the Milwaukee Brewers. His final start of the season was a poor one on October 2, allowing 8 runs in 4 innings against the Baltimore Orioles, however half of those runs were unearned due to two errors from shortstop Dick Schofield and one from Hentgen himself.

Hentgen made two starts in the 1993 playoffs, after which he only made one more with the Cardinals in 2000. In Game 3 of the ALCS against the White Sox, he allowed 6 runs in 3 innings, giving the White Sox their first win of the series. The Sox would tie the series after winning Game 4 as well, but the Jays would end up taking it 4-2. In the World Series, Hentgen again started Game 3, this time allowing just one run in 6 strong innings. The Jays won the game 10-3 to take a 2-1 series lead, and would go on to win it in 6 games.

Hentgen finished the 1993 season having pitched in 34 games (32 starts) throwing 216.1 innings, the third highest tally of his career. This season showed off Hentgen's capacity to pitch high amounts of innings for the first time, as he went at least 6 innings in 26 starts and threw at least 100 pitches in 22. He won 19 games, the second most of his career, and recorded a 3.87 ERA with 122 strikeouts. Hentgen finished 6th in Cy Young voting, just behind teammate Duane Ward and ahead of teammate Juan Guzman.

The following season, Hentgen was an All-Star again and went 13–8 with a 3.40 ERA. In 1995, he pitched poorly, going 10–14 with a 5.11 ERA and leading the AL with 236 hits allowed and 114 earned runs allowed.

==== 1996-1999 ====
In 1996, Hentgen went 8–6 before the All-Star break and then went 12–4 after the All-Star break. He won back-to-back AL pitcher of the month awards in July and August. Hentgen finished the season with a 20–10 win–loss record and a 3.22 ERA, ranking second in the AL in wins and ERA. He led the league with 265.2 innings pitched, 10 complete games, and 3 shutouts. For his efforts, he won the AL Cy Young Award, the first in Blue Jays franchise history.

The following year, Hentgen was an All-Star for the third and final time. He went 15–10 with a 3.68 ERA and led the AL with 264 innings pitched, 9 complete games, and 3 shutouts. In 1998, he went 12–11 with a 5.17 ERA. In 1999, he went 11–12 with a 4.79 ERA.

=== St. Louis Cardinals (2000) ===
In November 1999, the Blue Jays traded Hentgen to the St. Louis Cardinals alongside Paul Spoljaric, receiving Lance Painter, Alberto Castillo, and Matt DeWitt. He spent the 2000 season with the Cardinals, going 15–12 with a 4.72 ERA.

=== Baltimore Orioles (2001-2003) ===
In December 2000, Hentgen signed as a free agent with the Baltimore Orioles. In 2001, he went 2–3 with a 3.47 ERA and had Tommy John surgery in August. He went 0–4 with a 7.77 ERA in 2002 and 7–8 with a 4.09 ERA in 2003.

=== Return to Blue Jays (2004) ===
Hentgen signed as a free agent with the Blue Jays in November 2003. In 2004, he went 2–9 with a 6.95 ERA and then announced his retirement in July. Hentgen finished his MLB career with a 131–112 record, a 4.32 ERA, and 1,290 strikeouts in 2,075.1 innings pitched.

== Post-playing career ==
Hentgen rejoined the Toronto Blue Jays under new manager John Farrell as their new bullpen coach for the 2011 season. It was Hentgen's first coaching assignment. He stepped down in November 2011 due to family reasons, and was given the title of Special Assistant to the Organization. On December 10, 2012, Hentgen was again appointed as the Blue Jays bullpen coach.

On January 4, 2014, the Blue Jays announced that Bob Stanley would be replacing Hentgen as their bullpen coach. Hentgen continued to work with the Blue Jays, as a special assistant to the organization.

Hentgen was named to the Canadian Baseball Hall of Fame in the Class of 2016.
