= José Cruz Jr. =

Puerto Rican baseball player (born 1974)

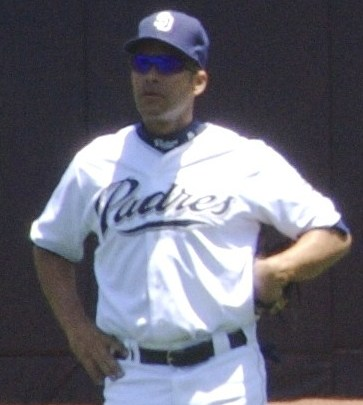
- Cruz with the San Diego Padres
- Outfielder
- Born: April 19, 1974 (age 52); Arroyo, Puerto Rico
- Batted: Switch Threw: Right

MLB debut
- May 31, 1997, for the Seattle Mariners

Last MLB appearance
- June 5, 2008, for the Houston Astros

MLB statistics
- Batting average: .247
- Home runs: 204
- Runs batted in: 624
- Stats at Baseball Reference

Teams
- Seattle Mariners (1997); Toronto Blue Jays (1997–2002); San Francisco Giants (2003); Tampa Bay Devil Rays (2004); Arizona Diamondbacks (2005); Boston Red Sox (2005); Los Angeles Dodgers (2005–2006); San Diego Padres (2007); Houston Astros (2008)

Career highlights and awards
- Gold Glove Award (2003)

José Luis Cruz Jr. (born April 19, 1974) is a Puerto Rican former professional baseball outfielder and coach. He played college baseball for the Rice Owls from 1992 to 1995 and played in Major League Baseball (MLB) for 12 seasons from 1997 to 2008. From 2022 to 2025 he was the head baseball coach of Rice.

Cruz was born in Arroyo, Puerto Rico. His father José Cruz was a baseball player and coach, and the family lived in Texas. He attended high school in Bellaire, Texas, when his father was a member of the Houston Astros. After graduation from Bellaire, Cruz enrolled at Rice University and played baseball for the Owls, starting for three seasons prior to being selected in the first round of the 1995 draft.

The Seattle Mariners selected Cruz in the first round of the 1995 Major League Baseball draft. He played 12 years as an outfielder in MLB, with Seattle in 1997, the Toronto Blue Jays from 1997 to 2002, the San Francisco Giants in 2003, the Tampa Bay Devil Rays in 2004, the Arizona Diamondbacks in 2005, the Boston Red Sox in 2005, the Los Angeles Dodgers from 2005 to 2006, the San Diego Padres in 2007 and the Houston Astros in 2008.

In 2021, Cruz was named the assistant hitting coach of the Detroit Tigers, but he left the position on June 12 to accept the head coaching job at Rice University. He is the son of former major league outfielder and Houston Astros first base coach José Cruz, and the nephew of former big leaguers Héctor and Tommy Cruz.

== Career ==
Cruz grew up in Bellaire, Texas and attended Bellaire High School (class of 1992) where he played baseball.

Cruz attended Rice University from 1992 to 1995 and was a member of Team USA in 1994. He was also a three time All-American while at Rice, setting virtually all possible offensive records.

Cruz was a first round pick, 3rd overall, for the Seattle Mariners in the 1995 amateur draft and began his major league career on May 31, 1997. He was not in Seattle very long and was traded to the Toronto Blue Jays for Paul Spoljaric and Mike Timlin on July 31, 1997. As of the 2019 season, Cruz holds record for most home runs in the first season of a career having played for two or more clubs. He stayed in Toronto until 2003 and twice hit at least 30 home runs with the Blue Jays. One of those was in 2001, when he also stole 32 bases to become one of three players to record 30 home runs and 30 stolen bases during that season (Bobby Abreu and Vladimir Guerrero were the others). He was signed as a free agent by the San Francisco Giants on January 28, 2003. In San Francisco, he won a Gold Glove and broke Willie Mays' franchise single-season record for outfield assists with 19. He was later acquired as a free agent by the Tampa Bay Devil Rays in 2004. In 2005, Cruz Jr. played for three teams, the Arizona Diamondbacks, Boston Red Sox and finally the Los Angeles Dodgers. Although injured most of the year, Cruz ended the season on a tear, hitting .301 with six homers as a Dodger.

Cruz was picked to play for Puerto Rico in the 2006 World Baseball Classic. In the tournament, Cruz hit .353 with a .476 on-base percentage in five games helping Puerto Rico reach the second round.

The Dodgers designated Cruz for assignment on August 1, 2006, and eventually released him. Cruz later signed a contract with the San Diego Padres and played for them for a portion of the 2007 season. Cruz was placed on unconditional release waivers by the Padres on August 1, 2007. On August 18, 2007, the New York Yankees signed him to a minor league deal.

On November 28, 2007, he signed a minor league deal with the Houston Astros. At the end of the 2008 spring training, he was added to the 40-man roster. He was later designated for assignment.

Cruz has worked as a Major League Baseball analyst for ESPN (Baseball Tonight) and MLB.com.

Cruz said that he moved from Bellaire after being arrested by Bellaire police for a missing front license plate on a newly purchased car and spending one night in jail in 2002. Cruz accused the police of racial profiling.

On December 8, 2020, Cruz was named assistant hitting coach for the Detroit Tigers.

On June 9, 2021, Cruz was hired as the head coach of the Rice Owls.

On March 13, 2025, Cruz was fired as the head coach at Rice after starting the season 2-14 and posting a 63-126 record during his tenure.

== Head coaching record ==
Record table
Season	Team	Overall	Conference	Standing	Postseason
Rice Owls (Conference USA) (2022–2023)
2022	Rice	17–39	9–21	T–9th	
2023	Rice	21–37	9–21	8th	C-USA Tournament
Rice Owls (American Athletic Conference) (2024–2025)
2024	Rice	23–36	11–16	T–8th	AAC Tournament
2025	Rice	2–14	0–0		
Rice:		63–126 (.333)	29–58 (.333)		
Total:		63–126 (.333)			
National champion Postseason invitational champion Conference regular season champion Conference regular season and conference tournament champion Division regular season champion Division regular season and conference tournament champion Conference tournament champion

== Personal life ==
Cruz's son Trei Cruz plays for the Detroit Tigers.

== Awards ==
Cruz was named the Toronto Blue Jays team MVP in 2001.

Cruz won the NL Gold Glove in 2003 as a member of the Giants.

== See also ==
- List of Major League Baseball players from Puerto Rico
- List of second-generation Major League Baseball players
- 30–30 club
