= Mike Timlin =

American baseball player (born 1966)

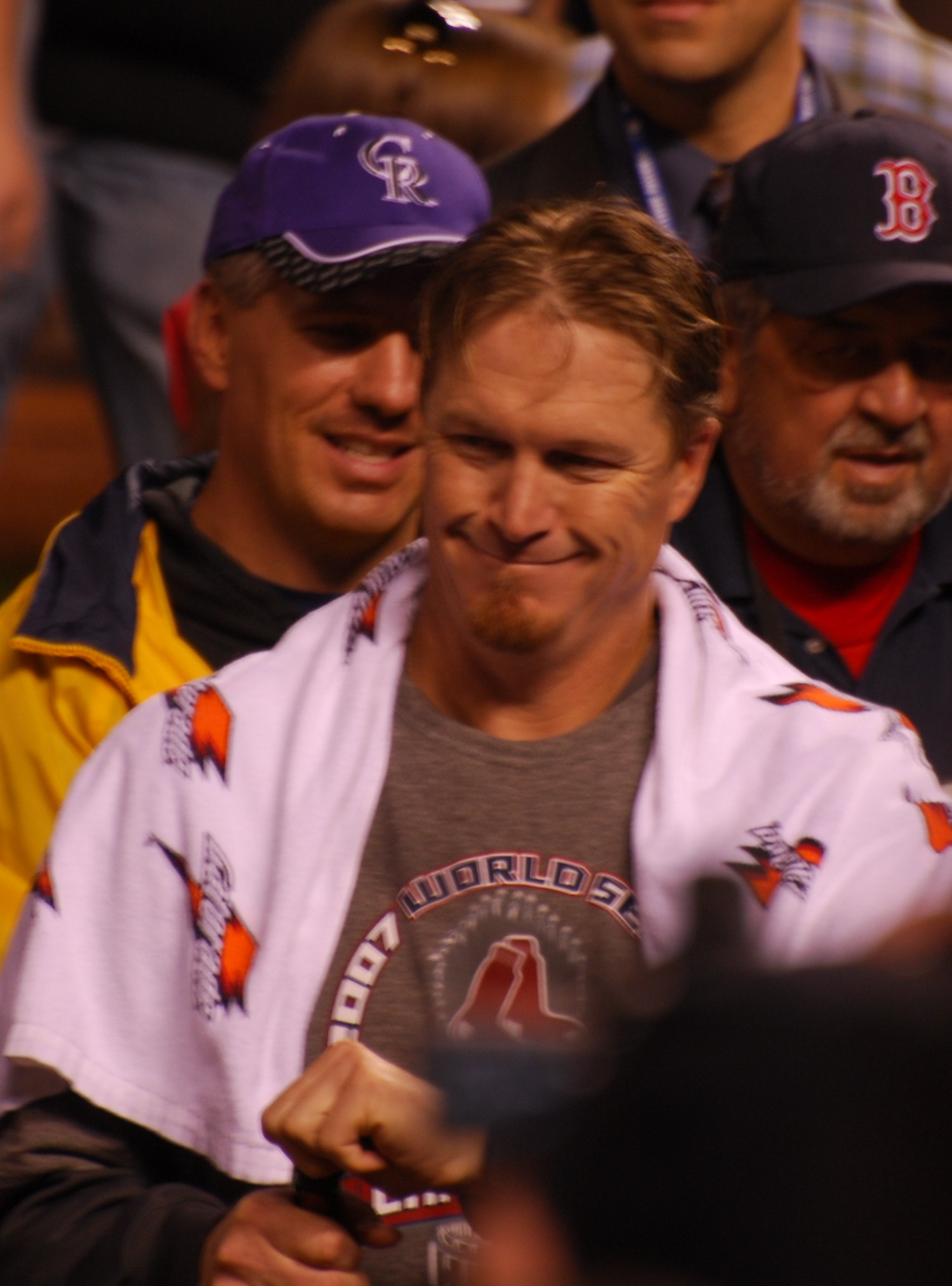
- Timlin after winning the 2007 World Series
- Pitcher
- Born: March 10, 1966 (age 60); Midland, Texas, U.S.
- Batted: Right Threw: Right

MLB debut
- April 8, 1991, for the Toronto Blue Jays

Last MLB appearance
- September 28, 2008, for the Boston Red Sox

MLB statistics
- Games pitched: 1,058
- Win–loss record: 75–73
- Earned run average: 3.63
- Strikeouts: 872
- Saves: 141
- Stats at Baseball Reference

Teams
- Toronto Blue Jays (1991–1997); Seattle Mariners (1997–1998); Baltimore Orioles (1999–2000); St. Louis Cardinals (2000–2002); Philadelphia Phillies (2002); Boston Red Sox (2003–2008)

Career highlights and awards
- 4× World Series champion (1992, 1993, 2004, 2007); Boston Red Sox Hall of Fame

Michael August Timlin (/ˈtɪmlɪn/; born March 10, 1966) is an American former professional baseball relief pitcher. Timlin played on four World Series championship teams in an 18-year career; the 1992 Toronto Blue Jays, 1993 Toronto Blue Jays, 2004 Boston Red Sox, and 2007 Boston Red Sox.

== Early life ==
Timlin was born in Midland, Texas, to Jerome Francis Timlin Sr. and Nancy Sharon Beyer. Timlin graduated from Midland High School; he attended and pitched at Southwestern University in Georgetown, Texas, where he was a member of Phi Delta Theta.

== Baseball career ==
=== Toronto Blue Jays ===
==== Minor leagues ====
Timlin was drafted in the fifth round of the 1987 Major League Baseball draft by the Toronto Blue Jays, and signed with the team on June 6, 1987. From 1987 through 1990, Timlin played for several of Toronto's minor league teams; the Rookie-level Medicine Hat Blue Jays (1987), the Class-A Myrtle Beach Blue Jays (1988), the High-A Dunedin Blue Jays (1989–90), and the Double-A Knoxville Blue Jays (1990).

==== Major leagues ====
Timlin made his first major league appearance on opening day, April 8, 1991, pitching 1 1/3 innings in relief against the Boston Red Sox. Two days later, he recorded his first strikeout (Tom Brunansky) and had his first win, pitching an inning in relief against the Red Sox. For the regular season, Timlin appeared in 63 games, all but three in relief, compiling a record of 11–6 with three saves and a 3.16 earned run average (ERA). In the postseason, he made four relief appearances in the American League Championship Series (ALCS) against the Minnesota Twins, including taking the loss in Game 3 after giving up a home run to Mike Pagliarulo in the 10th inning. Timlin was sixth in Rookie of the Year voting.

During the 1992 season, Timlin spent time with the Single-A Dunedin Blue Jays (six games), the Triple-A Syracuse Chiefs (seven games), and the major leagues (26 games). With Toronto, he had an 0–2 record with one save and a 4.12 ERA. In the postseason, he made two relief appearances in the ALCS against the Oakland Athletics, and two relief appearances in the World Series against the Atlanta Braves. He recorded his first postseason save in the deciding Game 6, facing a single batter, Otis Nixon, who Timlin threw out at first base on a bunt attempt in the 11th inning, for the final out of the series.

For the 1993 season, Timlin played four games with Single-A Dunedin and 54 games with Toronto, all in relief. His record with Toronto was 4–2, with 1 save and a 4.69 ERA. In the postseason, he made one appearance in the ALCS against the Chicago White Sox, and two appearances in the World Series against the Philadelphia Phillies. The Blue Jays won the World Series for the second consecutive year, giving Timlin two World Series rings in his first three MLB seasons.

Timlin made 34 appearances with Toronto in the 1994 season (0–1, with two saves and a 5.18 ERA), and 31 appearances in the 1995 season (4–3, with five saves and a 2.14 ERA). In 1995, he also appeared in 8 games with Triple-A Syracuse. For the 1996 season, he appeared in 59 games with Toronto (1–6, with 31 saves and a 3.65 ERA). During the 1997 season, Timlin made 38 appearances with Toronto through July 29; he had a 3–2 record, with nine saves and a 2.87 ERA. Timlin and Paul Spoljaric were traded to the Seattle Mariners in exchange for José Cruz Jr. on July 31, 1997.

In his seven seasons with the Blue Jays, Timlin appeared in 305 games, compiling a record of 23–22 with 52 saves and a 3.62 ERA. In 393 1/3 innings pitched, he struck out 331 batters while walking 167.

=== Seattle Mariners ===
Timlin made his first appearance with the Mariners on August 1, 1997, pitching one inning in relief against the Milwaukee Brewers. He made 26 total appearances with Seattle during the regular season; he had a 3–2 record, with one save and a 3.86 ERA. He appeared in one game in the American League Division Series (ALDS), giving up four runs to the Baltimore Orioles in 2/3 of an inning during Game 1.

For the 1998 season, Timlin appeared in 70 games with Seattle; he had a 3–3 record, 19 saves, and a 2.95 ERA. After the season, Timlin became a free agent. In his two seasons with Seattle, he appeared in 96 games with 20 saves, while striking out 69 and walking 21 in 105 innings pitched, with a 3.17 ERA.

=== Baltimore Orioles ===
On November 13, 1998, Timlin signed a four-year, $16 million contract with the Baltimore Orioles. During the 1999 season, he appeared in 62 games for the Orioles, going 3–9 with 27 saves and a 3.57 ERA. For the 2000 season, he was with the Orioles through late July, appearing in 37 games, with a record of 2–3, 11 saves, and a 4.89 ERA. On July 29, 2000, Timlin was traded (along with cash) to the St. Louis Cardinals in exchange for Chris Richard and minor league player Mark Nussbeck. In two seasons with Baltimore, Timlin appeared in 99 games, compiling a record of 5–12, with 38 saves and a 4.04 ERA, while striking out 76 and walking 38 in 98 innings pitched.

=== St. Louis Cardinals ===
Timlin made his first appearance with the Cardinals (and in the National League) on July 30, 2000, pitching one inning in relief against the New York Mets. He made 25 appearances with the Cardinals during the regular season; he had a 3–1 record, with one save and a 3.34 ERA. He appeared in two games of the National League Division Series (NLDS) against the Atlanta Braves, and in three games of the National League Championship Series (NLCS) against the Mets. He took the loss in Game 2 of the NLCS, giving up an unearned run while pitching the ninth inning.

For the 2001 season, Timlin appeared in 67 games with St. Louis; he had a 4–5 record, three saves, and a 4.09 ERA. He had his first major league at bat on October 6 against the Houston Astros, grounding out in the fifth inning. He made one appearance in the postseason, pitching 1 1/3 scoreless innings against the Arizona Diamondbacks in the NLDS.

During the 2002 season, he was with the Cardinals through late July, appearing in 42 games, with a record of 1–3 and a 2.51 ERA. On April 19, he made his first start since his rookie season, taking the loss against the Milwaukee Brewers; he pitched 4 1/3 innings, giving up four runs (all earned) while striking out three batters and walking one. On July 29, 2002, Timlin, Plácido Polanco, and Bud Smith were traded to the Philadelphia Phillies in exchange for Scott Rolen, Doug Nickle, and cash.

In his three seasons with St. Louis, Timlin appeared in 134 games, compiling a record of 8–9, with four saves and a 3.36 ERA. In 163 1/3 innings pitched, he struck out 108 batters while walking 46.

=== Philadelphia Phillies ===
Timlin made his first appearance with the Phillies on July 31, 2002, pitching two innings in relief (and getting the win) against the San Francisco Giants. Through the end of the regular season, he appeared in 30 games with Philadelphia, compiling a 3–3 record and a 3.79 ERA. In 35 2/3 innings pitched, he struck out 15 batters while walking seven. After the season, Timlin again became a free agent.

=== Boston Red Sox ===
On January 6, 2003, Timlin signed a one-year, $1.85 million contract with the Boston Red Sox. During the 2003 season, he appeared in 72 games for Boston, compiling a 6–4 record, with 2 saves and a 3.55 ERA. In the postseason, he appeared in three games of the ALDS against the Oakland Athletics, and five games of the ALCS against the New York Yankees. In those eight games, he pitched 9 1/3 innings, facing 32 batters while striking out 11 and only giving up two walks, one hit, and no runs. After the season, Timlin was re-signed by the Red Sox to a two-year, $5.25 million contract in November 2003.

Timlin made 76 appearances during the 2004 season; he had a 5–4 record, with one save and a 4.13 ERA. On September 3, he made his 800th major league appearance, becoming only the 29th pitcher in major league history to reach that mark. In the postseason he appeared in three games of the ALDS against the Anaheim Angels, five games of the ALCS against the Yankees, and three games of the World Series against the St. Louis Cardinals. In those 11 games, he pitched 11 2/3 innings, facing 56 batters while striking out seven and giving up seven walks, 15 hits, and eight runs. With Boston's sweep of St. Louis in the World Series, Timlin earned the third championship of his career.

Timlin's 2005 season yielded the best numbers of his career. He made 81 appearances (a career high) with a record of 7–3, 13 saves, and a 2.24 ERA. In 80 1/3 innings pitched, Timlin struck out 59 while walking 20 and only allowing two home runs. He pitched an inning in the ALDS, giving up one run as the Red Sox were swept by the White Sox. On November 2, 2005, Timlin signed a one-year, $3.5 million contract extension with the Red Sox.

After his first three seasons with the Red Sox, Timlin struggled with injuries to his right shoulder and left oblique in 2006 and the beginning of 2007, making multiple visits to the disabled list. For the 2006 season, he made 68 appearances with a record of 6–6, nine saves, and a 4.36 ERA. On October 25, 2006, Timlin signed a one-year, $2.8 million contract to remain with the Red Sox.

During the 2007 season, Timlin appeared in 50 games with a record of 2–1, one save, and a 3.42 ERA. He also made eight appearances with the Triple-A Pawtucket Red Sox while rehabilitating. He made his 1,000th career appearance on August 31, against the Baltimore Orioles. In the postseason, he made three appearances in the ALCS against the Cleveland Indians, and three appearances in the World Series against the Colorado Rockies. In those six games, he pitched 5 2/3 innings, facing 30 batters while striking out seven, issuing no walks, and giving up two runs. With Boston's sweep of Colorado in the World Series, Timlin earned the fourth championship of his career. He is the only pitcher to appear in, and win, four World Series without winning at least one with the New York Yankees. On December 7, 2007, Timlin was re-signed to another one-year deal.

Timlin made 47 appearances during the 2008 season, with a record of 4–4, 1 save, and a 5.66 ERA (the highest of his career). He also made five rehabilitation appearances with Triple-A Pawtucket. In the postseason, he appeared in two games against the Tampa Bay Rays in the ALCS; he took the loss in Game 2 after giving up a run in the 11th inning, and his two innings in relief during Game 4, which Boston lost by nine runs, would be the final MLB appearance of his career. After the season ended, Timlin again became a free agent.

In his six seasons with Boston, Timlin appeared in 394 MLB games, compiling a record of 30–22, with 27 saves and a 3.76 ERA. In 409 innings pitched, he struck out 273 batters while walking 98.

=== Late career ===
On July 29, 2009, Timlin signed a minor league contract with the Colorado Rockies. He made six minor league appearances; two for the Rookie-level Casper Ghosts and then four for the Triple-A Colorado Springs Sky Sox. On August 13, 2009, Timlin was released by the Rockies, following which he retired from baseball.

=== Career totals ===
In 18 MLB seasons, Timlin compiled a record of 75–73, with 141 saves, and a 3.63 ERA. In 1,204 1/3 innings pitched, he struck out 872 batters while walking 377. As a hitter, he had seven at-bats (all with St. Louis); he struck out four times and did not reach base. As of the end of the 2025 season, Timlin ranks eighth all-time in appearances for MLB pitchers, having played in 1,058 games.

Timlin wore uniform number 40 with Toronto, Seattle, and Baltimore. When he was traded to St. Louis in 2000, uniform number 40 was already in use by Andy Benes, so Timlin changed to uniform number 50. He later kept that number with Philadelphia and Boston. Timlin was ejected twice in his MLB career, both times during the 2002 season.

Timlin was also a member of the United States national baseball team that competed in the 2006 World Baseball Classic.

== Pitching style ==
Listed at 6 feet 4 inches (1.93 m) and 205 pounds (93 kg), Timlin threw and batted right-handed. He was known for his sinking fastball that reached 94 mph (151 km/h). His sinker and slider had a downward break, inducing a significant number of ground balls.

== Honors ==
Timlin was the 2007 recipient of the Lou Gehrig Memorial Award, which is awarded annually to an MLB player who has made exemplary contributions to "both his community and philanthropy."

On April 19, 2009, Timlin was honored by the Red Sox, throwing out the ceremonial first pitch on "Mike Timlin Day" at Fenway Park.

In 2010, Timlin was inducted to Southwestern University's Hall of Fame.

== Personal life ==
Timlin has three sisters. He and his wife have two children, born in 1996 and 2000. The Timlins are organizers of "The Sharon Timlin Memorial 5K Race to Cure ALS", held annually since 2004; Timlin's mother died of amyotrophic lateral sclerosis (ALS) in March 2002. Timlin identifies as an evangelical Christian.

In 2006, with former teammates Johnny Damon and Édgar Rentería, Timlin was featured on an episode of the animated television series Arthur, providing his voice for the Elwood City Grebes pitcher "Winlin."

During the 2017 season, Timlin worked as color commentator with play-by-play announcer Dave O'Brien for several Red Sox games in July.

Timlin was present at the concert where the Las Vegas shooting occurred on October 1, 2017 but escaped unharmed.

Timlin is the godfather of teammate Paul Spoljaric's son, Garner.

== See also ==
- List of Major League Baseball career games finished leaders
- 2006 World Baseball Classic rosters
