= 1996 Seattle Mariners season =

1996 Seattle Mariners
- League: American League
- Division: West
- Ballpark: Kingdome
- City: Seattle, Washington
- Record: 85–76 (.528)
- Divisional place: 2nd
- Owners: Hiroshi Yamauchi (represented by John Ellis)
- General managers: Woody Woodward
- Managers: Lou Piniella
- Television: KIRO-TV 7 Prime Sports NW
- Radio: KIRO 710 AM (Dave Niehaus, Rick Rizzs, Ron Fairly)

The 1996 Seattle Mariners season was the 20th season in franchise history, and the team was the runner-up in American League (AL) West, with a record of 85–76 (.528), 4 1/2 games behind the champion Texas Rangers. The Mariners led the majors in runs (993), doubles (335), runs batted in (954), and slugging percentage (.484), but the pitching staff had the highest earned run average (5.21) in team history, later surpassed in 1999. Four Mariners scored at least 100 runs and drove in at least 100 runs. The May 2 game against the Cleveland Indians was suspended following an earthquake at the Kingdome and completed the following day. In their game against the Kansas City Royals on May 11, the Mariners set a franchise record of 12 extra-base hits.

The Mariners were one of four AL teams that played only 161 games in 1996. A three-game series in Cleveland in September was shortened to a two-game doubleheader after the Friday night game was declared unofficial after a rain delay.

The Mariners traded away future Hall of Famer David Ortiz in September to complete a trade to acquire former All-Star Dave Hollins, who left the team after the season.

== Offseason ==
- November 29, 1995: Mike Blowers was traded by the Mariners to the Los Angeles Dodgers for Willis Otañez and Miguel Cairo.
- January 23, 1996: Aaron Small was selected off waivers by the Mariners from the Florida Marlins.
- January 29: Small was selected off waivers from the Mariners by the Oakland Athletics.
- March 25: Ricky Jordan was purchased by the Mariners from the California Angels.

== Regular season ==
=== Season standings ===
AL West
Team	W	L	Pct.	GB	Home	Road
Texas Rangers	90	72	.556	—	50‍–‍31	40‍–‍41
Seattle Mariners	85	76	.528	4½	43‍–‍38	42‍–‍38
Oakland Athletics	78	84	.481	12	40‍–‍41	38‍–‍43
California Angels	70	91	.435	19½	43‍–‍38	27‍–‍53

=== Record vs. opponents ===
1996 American League record Source: MLB Standings Grid – 1996
Team	BAL	BOS	CAL	CWS	CLE	DET	KC	MIL	MIN	NYY	OAK	SEA	TEX	TOR
Baltimore	—	7–6	6–6	4–8	5–7	11–2	9–3	9–3	7–5	3–10	9–4	7–5	3–10–1	8–5
Boston	6–7	—	8–4	6–6	1–11	12–1	3–9	7–5	6–6	7–6	8–5	7–6	6–6	8–5
California	6–6	4–8	—	6–6	4–9	6–6	4–8	7–5	4–8	7–6	6–7	5–8	4–9	7–5
Chicago	8–4	6–6	6–6	—	5–8	10–3	7–6	6–7	6–7	6–7	5–7	5–7	8–4	7–5
Cleveland	7–5	11–1	9–4	8–5	—	12–0	7–6	7–6	10–3	3–9	6–6	8–4	4–8	7–5
Detroit	2–11	1–12	6–6	3–10	0–12	—	6–6	4–8	6–6	5–8	4–8	6–6	4–9	6–7
Kansas City	3–9	9–3	8–4	6–7	6–7	6–6	—	4–9	6–7	4–8	5–7	7–5	6–6	5–8
Milwaukee	3–9	5–7	5–7	7–6	6–7	8–4	9–4	—	9–4	6–6	7–5	4–9	6–7	5–7
Minnesota	5–7	6–6	8–4	7–6	3–10	6–6	7–6	4–9	—	5–7	6–7	6–6	7–5	8–5
New York	10–3	6–7	6–7	7–6	9–3	8–5	8–4	6–6	7–5	—	9–3	3–9	5–7	8–5
Oakland	4–9	5–8	7–6	7–5	6–6	8–4	7–5	5–7	7–6	3–9	—	8–5	7–6	4–8
Seattle	5–7	6–7	8–5	7–5	4–8	6–6	5–7	9–4	6–6	9–3	5–8	—	10–3	5–7
Texas	10–3–1	6–6	9–4	4–8	8–4	9–4	6–6	7–6	5–7	7–5	6–7	3–10	—	10–2
Toronto	5–8	5–8	5–7	5–7	5–7	7–6	8–5	7–5	5–8	5–8	8–4	7–5	2–10	—

=== Game log ===
1996 Game Log: 85–76 (Home: 43–38; Away: 42–38)
March: 1–0 (Home: 1–0; Away: 0–0)

#	Date	Opponent	Score	Win	Loss	Save	Attendance	Record
1	March 31	White Sox	3–2 (12)	**Hurtado** (1–0)	Simas	—	57,467	1–0

April: 15–10 (Home: 8–5; Away: 7–5)

#	Date	Opponent	Score	Win	Loss	Save	Attendance	Record
2	April 2	White Sox	3–2	**Hitchcock** (1–0)	Alvarez	**Charlton** (1)	38,570	2–0
3	April 3	White Sox	2–4	Magrane	**Wolcott** (0–1)	Hernandez	22,783	2–1
4	April 5	Brewers	6–10	Karl	**Hurtado** (1–1)	—	27,768	2–2
5	April 6	Brewers	8–5	**Johnson** (1–0)	Sparks	—	56,892	3–2
6	April 7	Brewers	3–1	**Hitchcock** (2–0)	Bones	**Jackson** (1)	21,004	4–2
7	April 9	@ Tigers	9–10	Keagle	**Menhart** (0–1)	Williams	42,932	4–3
8	April 10	@ Tigers	3–7	Olivares	**Hurtado** (1–2)	—	9,299	4–4
9	April 11	@ Tigers	9–1	**Johnson** (2–0)	Gohr	—	12,272	5–4
10	April 12	@ Blue Jays	9–6	**Hitchcock** (3–0)	Quantrill	—	31,293	6–4
11	April 13	@ Blue Jays	14–3	**Bosio** (1–0)	Ware	—	33,645	7–4
12	April 14	@ Blue Jays	9–4	**Wolcott** (1–1)	Hentgen	—	29,301	8–4
13	April 15	Angels	11–10	**Charlton** (1–0)	Eichhorn	—	36,960	9–4
14	April 16	Angels	5–3	**Johnson** (3–0)	Abbott	—	25,404	10–4
15	April 17	Tigers	8–3	**Jackson** (1–0)	Veres	—	18,008	11–4
16	April 18	Tigers	11–3	**Bosio** (2–0)	Sodowsky	**Hurtado** (1)	17,536	12–4
17	April 19	Blue Jays	4–10	Hentgen	**Wolcott** (1–2)	Bohanon	32,189	12–5
18	April 20	Blue Jays	1–3	Guzman	**Menhart** (0–2)	Timlin	47,487	12–6
19	April 21	Blue Jays	9–5	**Johnson** (4–0)	Hanson	—	34,915	13–6
20	April 22	Blue Jays	7–16	Castillo	**Hurtado** (1–3)	—	18,467	13–7
21	April 24	@ White Sox	1–2	Alvarez	**Bosio** (2–1)	Hernandez	15,882	13–8
22	April 25	@ White Sox	3–4	Tapani	**Wolcott** (1–3)	Hernandez	14,679	13–9
23	April 26	@ Brewers	6–5	**Carmona** (1–0)	Potts	**Charlton** (2)	13,072	14–9
24	April 27	@ Brewers	6–5	**Wells** (1–0)	Bones	**Charlton** (3)	17,270	15–9
25	April 28	@ Brewers	9–16	Potts	**Davis** (0–1)	—	19,717	15–10
26	April 30	@ Rangers	8–0	**Bosio** (3–1)	Gross	—	27,272	16–10

May: 12–14 (Home: 8–9; Away: 4–5)

#	Date	Opponent	Score	Win	Loss	Save	Attendance	Record
27	May 1	@ Rangers	4–5	Russell	**Jackson** (1–1)	Henneman	31,775	16–11
28	May 2	Indians	4–6	Hershiser	**Wolcott** (1–4)	Mesa	21,711	16–12
29	May 3	Indians	2–5	Nagy	**Hitchcock** (3–1)	Mesa	38,086	16–13
30	May 4	Indians	5–1	**Menhart** (1–2)	Lopez	—	57,133	17–13
31	May 5	Indians	0–2	Martinez	**Bosio** (3–2)	Mesa	56,883	17–14
32	May 6	Twins	5–4	**Wells** (2–0)	Radke	**Charlton** (4)	32,203	18–14
33	May 7	Twins	0–2	Parra	**Wolcott** (1–5)	Stevens	15,626	18–15
34	May 8	Twins	5–7 (10)	Guardado	**Wells** (2–1)	Stevens	22,175	18–16
35	May 10	Royals	10–14	Valera	**Davis** (0–2)	—	24,231	18–17
36	May 11	Royals	11–1	**Wolcott** (2–5)	Belcher	**Carmona** (1)	43,297	19–17
37	May 12	Royals	8–5	**Johnson** (5–0)	Linton	**Charlton** (5)	27,470	20–17
38	May 14	@ Yankees	0–2	Gooden	**Hitchcock** (3–2)	—	20,786	20–18
39	May 15	@ Yankees	10–5	**Hurtado** (2–3)	Key	—	20,680	21–18
40	May 17	@ Orioles	13–14	Mills	**Charlton** (1–1)	—	47,259	21–19
41	May 18	@ Orioles	7–3	**Milacki** (1–0)	Mercker	—	46,434	22–19
42	May 19	@ Orioles	7–8	Mussina	**Hurtado** (2–4)	Myers	47,565	22–20
43	May 21	@ Red Sox	13–7	**Wells** (3–1)	Eshelman	—	24,528	23–20
44	May 22	@ Red Sox	6–1	**Wolcott** (3–5)	Wakefield	—	26,753	24–20
45	May 23	@ Red Sox	4–11	Clemens	**Milacki** (1–1)	—	31,551	24–21
46	May 24	Yankees	10–4	**Hitchcock** (4–2)	Kamieniecki	—	44,236	25–21
47	May 25	Yankees	4–5	Mendoza	**Hurtado** (2–5)	Wetteland	57,173	25–22
48	May 26	Yankees	4–3	**Menhart** (2–2)	Gooden	**Charlton** (6)	42,410	26–22
49	May 28	Orioles	8–12	Rhodes	**Guetterman** (0–1)	Haynes	23,235	26–23
50	May 29	Orioles	9–8	**Charlton** (2–1)	Myers	—	20,253	27–23
51	May 30	Red Sox	1–10	Gordon	**Torres** (0–1)	—	17,395	27–24
52	May 31	Red Sox	9–6	**Wells** (4–1)	Garces	—	29,119	28–24

June: 14–12 (Home: 5–5; Away: 9–7)

#	Date	Opponent	Score	Win	Loss	Save	Attendance	Record
53	June 1	Red Sox	5–6	Wakefield	**Milacki** (1–2)	Slocumb	34,822	28–25
54	June 2	Red Sox	3–1	**Wolcott** (4–5)	Clemens	**Jackson** (2)	47,540	29–25
55	June 4	@ Indians	10–7	**Carmona** (2–0)	Mesa	**Charlton** (7)	42,179	30–25
56	June 5	@ Indians	5–13	Plunk	**Milacki** (1–3)	—	42,274	30–26
57	June 6	@ Indians	5–2	**Wells** (5–1)	Martinez	**Charlton** (8)	42,236	31–26
58	June 7	@ Royals	5–9	Valera	**Wolcott** (4–6)	—	20,891	31–27
59	June 8	@ Royals	8–12	Appier	**Milacki** (1–4)	Montgomery	30,022	31–28
60	June 9	@ Royals	3–2	**Hitchcock** (5–2)	Gubicza	**Charlton** (9)	20,489	32–28
61	June 10	@ Twins	6–13	Aldred	**Wagner** (0–1)	Trombley	17,134	32–29
62	June 11	@ Twins	18–8	**Wells** (6–1)	Aguilera	**Hurtado** (2)	14,395	33–29
63	June 12	@ Twins	5–3	**Wolcott** (5–6)	Radke	**Charlton** (10)	15,830	34–29
64	June 14	White Sox	1–4	Alvarez	**Hitchcock** (5–3)	Hernandez	30,163	34–30
65	June 15	White Sox	8–6 (12)	**Carmona** (3–0)	McCaskill	—	47,042	35–30
66	June 16	White Sox	7–6	**Wells** (7–1)	Magrane	**Jackson** (3)	34,588	36–30
67	June 18	Blue Jays	3–11	Guzman	**Wolcott** (5–7)	—	25,912	36–31
68	June 19	Blue Jays	2–9	Hanson	**Harikkala** (0–1)	—	26,265	36–32
69	June 20	@ White Sox	8–5	**Hitchcock** (6–3)	Tapani	**Charlton** (11)	23,017	37–32
70	June 21	@ White Sox	12–2	**Wagner** (1–1)	Magrane	—	23,253	38–32
71	June 22	@ White Sox	4–2	**Wells** (8–1)	Fernandez	**Charlton** (12)	27,036	39–32
72	June 23	@ White Sox	6–7 (10)	McCaskill	**Guetterman** (0–2)	—	26,768	39–33
73	June 25	@ Blue Jays	7–8	Crabtree	**Charlton** (2–2)	—	31,420	39–34
74	June 26	@ Blue Jays	5–6	Ware	**Ayala** (0–1)	Crabtree	30,158	39–35
75	June 27	@ Blue Jays	9–1	**Wells** (9–1)	Quantrill	—	31,108	40–35
76	June 28	Rangers	19–8	**Carmona** (4–0)	Pavlik	—	34,413	41–35
77	June 29	Rangers	5–9	Oliver	**Meacham** (0–1)	—	37,556	41–36
78	June 30	Rangers	4–3	**Hitchcock** (7–3)	Witt	**Charlton** (13)	33,392	42–36

July: 16–12 (Home: 8–6; Away: 8–6)

#	Date	Opponent	Score	Win	Loss	Save	Attendance	Record
79	July 1	Athletics	4–6	Wengert	**Wagner** (1–2)	Taylor	18,166	42–37
80	July 2	Athletics	6–11	Mohler	**Charlton** (2–3)	—	19,632	42–38
81	July 3	Athletics	4–3	**Ayala** (1–1)	Reyes	—	36,619	43–38
82	July 4	@ Rangers	9–5	**Carmona** (5–0)	Henneman	—	46,668	44–38
83	July 5	@ Rangers	6–3	**Hitchcock** (8–3)	Witt	—	46,397	45–38
84	July 6	@ Rangers	9–5	**Wagner** (2–2)	Gross	—	46,458	46–38
85	July 7	@ Rangers	3–8	Hill	**Wells** (9–2)	—	36,933	46–39
86	July 11	Angels	5–4 (12)	**Carmona** (6–0)	Monteleone	—	25,949	47–39
87	July 12	Angels	7–6 (10)	**Ayala** (2–1)	McElroy	—	29,618	48–39
88	July 13	Angels	4–6	Boskie	**Ayala** (2–2)	Percival	37,792	48–40
89	July 14	Angels	8–0	**Wells** (10–2)	Grimsley	—	33,243	49–40
90	July 15	@ Athletics	5–1	**Wolcott** (6–7)	Telgheder	—	11,183	50–40
91	July 16	@ Athletics	5–12	Chouinard	**Hitchcock** (8–4)	—	15,206	50–41
92	July 17	@ Athletics	6–7	Corsi	**Minor** (0–1)	Taylor	14,387	50–42
93	July 18	@ Angels	15–3	**Meacham** (1–1)	Boskie	—	22,780	51–42
94	July 19	@ Angels	4–9	Grimsley	**Wells** (10–3)	—	23,332	51–43
95	July 20	@ Angels	4–5	Schmidt	**Charlton** (2–4)	Percival	31,759	51–44
96	July 21	@ Angels	6–2	**Hitchcock** (9–4)	Abbott	—	22,088	52–44
97	July 22	Brewers	8–3	**Wagner** (3–2)	Mercedes	—	40,555	53–44
98	July 23	Brewers	3–7	Karl	**Carmona** (6–1)	—	22,378	53–45
99	July 24	Brewers	8–7	**Ayala** (3–2)	Fetters	—	19,899	54–45
100	July 25	Tigers	4–7 (10)	Lima	**Ayala** (3–3)	—	19,949	54–46
101	July 26	Tigers	6–4	**Hitchcock** (10–4)	Sager	**Jackson** (4)	25,175	55–46
102	July 27	Tigers	13–7	**Davis** (1–2)	Williams	—	43,209	56–46
103	July 28	Tigers	6–14	Olivares	**Bosio** (3–3)	—	38,204	56–47
104	July 30	@ Brewers	6–5	**Wells** (11–3)	Eldred	**Ayala** (1)	—	57–47
105	July 30	@ Brewers	3–4	Van Egmond	**Wolcott** (6–8)	Fetters	18,591	57–48
106	July 31	@ Brewers	9–3	**Hitchcock** (11–4)	D'Amico	—	30,772	58–48

August: 12–17 (Home: 5–10; Away: 7–7)

#	Date	Opponent	Score	Win	Loss	Save	Attendance	Record
107	August 1	@ Brewers	9–2	**Moyer** (1–0)	McDonald	—	18,425	59–48
108	August 2	@ Tigers	2–8	Olivares	**Wagner** (3–3)	—	23,405	59–49
109	August 3	@ Tigers	3–6	Olson	**Charlton** (2–5)	—	25,928	59–50
110	August 4	@ Tigers	9–3	**Wolcott** (7–8)	Nitkowski	—	23,569	60–50
111	August 6	Indians	3–4	Lopez	**Wells** (11–4)	Mesa	31,472	60–51
112	August 7	Indians	4–5	Tavarez	**Charlton** (2–6)	Mesa	30,431	60–52
113	August 8	Indians	1–2	Ogea	**Mulholland** (0–1)	Mesa	36,822	60–53
114	August 9	Twins	5–6	Parra	**Wolcott** (7–9)	Rodriguez	25,130	60–54
115	August 10	Twins	4–10	Klingenbeck	**Hitchcock** (11–5)	—	34,381	60–55
116	August 11	Twins	3–6	Radke	**Wells** (11–5)	Rodriguez	36,114	60–56
117	August 12	Royals	4–10	Appier	**Moyer** (1–1)	Huisman	43,476	60–57
118	August 13	Royals	9–5	**Mulholland** (1–1)	Linton	**Johnson** (1)	21,961	61–57
119	August 14	Royals	1–3	Rosado	**Wolcott** (7–10)	Montgomery	23,709	61–58
120	August 16	@ Yankees	6–5	**Hitchcock** (12–5)	Polley	**Jackson** (5)	50,724	62–58
121	August 17	@ Yankees	10–3	**Moyer** (2–1)	Rogers	—	51,729	63–58
122	August 18	@ Yankees	13–12 (12)	**Ayala** (4–3)	Mecir	**Jackson** (6)	44,769	64–58
123	August 19	@ Yankees	4–10	Pettitte	**Carmona** (6–2)	—	33,994	64–59
124	August 20	@ Orioles	1–4	Mussina	**Wagner** (3–4)	Myers	47,679	64–60
125	August 21	@ Orioles	5–10	Erickson	**Hitchcock** (12–6)	—	47,198	64–61
126	August 22	@ Orioles	10–3	**Moyer** (3–1)	Coppinger	—	47,380	65–61
127	August 23	@ Red Sox	6–4	**Bosio** (4–3)	Brandenburg	**Ayala** (2)	33,079	66–61
128	August 24	@ Red Sox	5–9	Lacy	**Wells** (11–6)	—	32,928	66–62
129	August 25	@ Red Sox	5–8	Maddux	**Wagner** (3–5)	Slocumb	34,377	66–63
130	August 26	Yankees	2–1	**Ayala** (5–3)	Lloyd	**Charlton** (14)	32,857	67–63
131	August 27	Yankees	7–4	**Moyer** (4–1)	Lloyd	—	32,975	68–63
132	August 28	Yankees	10–2	**Mulholland** (2–1)	Gooden	—	30,952	69–63
133	August 29	Orioles	9–6	**Charlton** (3–6)	Myers	—	24,915	70–63
134	August 30	Orioles	2–5	Coppinger	**Hitchcock** (12–7)	Mills	44,532	70–64
135	August 31	Orioles	6–7	Erickson	**Bosio** (4–4)	Benitez	42,092	70–65

September: 15–11 (Home: 8–3; Away: 7–8)

#	Date	Opponent	Score	Win	Loss	Save	Attendance	Record
136	September 1	Orioles	5–1	**Mulholland** (3–1)	Wells	—	50,015	71–65
137	September 2	Red Sox	8–9 (10)	Slocumb	**Carmona** (6–3)	—	24,470	71–66
138	September 3	Red Sox	11–9	**Torres** (1–1)	Gordon	**Charlton** (15)	17,374	72–66
139	September 4	Red Sox	5–7	Mahomes	**Hitchcock** (12–8)	Slocumb	22,642	72–67
140	September 8	@ Indians	1–2	Nagy	**Mulholland** (3–2)	—	42,307	72–68
141	September 8	@ Indians	6–5	**Charlton** (4–6)	Mesa	—	42,217	73–68
142	September 10	@ Royals	2–4	Rosado	**Torres** (1–2)	Bluma	12,499	73–69
143	September 11	@ Royals	2–4	Linton	**Moyer** (4–2)	Bluma	13,078	73–70
144	September 12	@ Royals	8–5	**Mulholland** (4–2)	Haney	**Charlton** (16)	15,045	74–70
145	September 13	@ Twins	13–7	**Wells** (12–6)	Miller	—	15,510	75–70
146	September 14	@ Twins	5–3 (10)	**Ayala** (6–3)	Guardado	**Charlton** (17)	18,002	76–70
147	September 15	@ Twins	7–0	**Torres** (2–2)	Robertson	—	25,142	77–70
148	September 16	Rangers	6–0	**Moyer** (5–2)	Burkett	—	50,544	78–70
149	September 17	Rangers	5–2	**Mulholland** (5–2)	Hill	**Ayala** (3)	32,279	79–70
150	September 18	Rangers	5–2	**Hitchcock** (13–8)	Witt	**Charlton** (18)	35,162	80–70
151	September 19	Rangers	7–6	**Davis** (2–2)	Cook	**Charlton** (19)	39,769	81–70
152	September 20	Athletics	12–2	**Carmona** (7–3)	Wengert	**Meacham** (1)	56,535	82–70
153	September 21	Athletics	9–2	**Moyer** (6–2)	Telgheder	—	56,103	83–70
154	September 22	Athletics	11–13	Mohler	**Mulholland** (5–3)	Taylor	54,194	83–71
155	September 23	@ Angels	3–4	Finley	**Hitchcock** (13–9)	Percival	16,212	83–72
156	September 24	@ Angels	6–11	Springer	**Wells** (12–7)	—	18,891	83–73
157	September 25	@ Angels	11–2	**Torres** (3–2)	Boskie	—	17,160	84–73
158	September 26	@ Athletics	5–7	Taylor	**Charlton** (4–7)	—	11,141	84–74
159	September 27	@ Athletics	1–8	Telgheder	**Mulholland** (5–4)	—	25,132	84–75
160	September 28	@ Athletics	5–3 (10)	**Carmona** (8–3)	Acre	**Charlton** (20)	30,057	85–75
161	September 29	@ Athletics	1–3	Small	**Torres** (3–3)	Taylor	34,462	85–76

Legend: = Win = Loss
Bold = Mariners team member

=== Detailed records ===
American League
Opponent	W	L	WP	RS	RA
AL East
Baltimore Orioles	5	7	0.417	82	81
Boston Red Sox	6	7	0.462	81	88
Detroit Tigers	6	6	0.500	83	73
New York Yankees	9	3	0.750	80	56
Toronto Blue Jays	5	7	0.417	79	82
Total	31	30	0.508	405	380
AL Central
Chicago White Sox	7	5	0.583	58	46
Cleveland Indians	4	8	0.333	46	54
Kansas City Royals	5	7	0.417	71	74
Milwaukee Brewers	9	4	0.692	84	73
Minnesota Twins	6	6	0.500	76	69
Total	31	30	0.508	335	316
AL West
California Angels	8	5	0.615	89	65
Oakland Athletics	5	8	0.385	74	78
**Seattle Mariners**					
Texas Rangers	10	3	0.769	90	56
Total	23	16	0.590	253	199
Season Total	85	76	0.528	993	895

Month	Games	Won	Lost	Win %	RS	RA
March	1	1	0	1.000	3	2
April	25	15	10	0.600	164	138
May	26	12	14	0.462	159	151
June	26	14	12	0.538	173	163
July	28	16	12	0.571	176	157
August	29	12	17	0.414	158	163
September	26	15	11	0.577	160	121
Total	161	85	76	0.528	993	895

	Games	Won	Lost	Win %	RS	RA
Home	81	43	38	0.531	473	449
Away	80	42	38	0.525	520	446
Total	161	85	76	0.528	993	895

=== Notable transactions ===
- April 13, 1996: Félix Fermín was released by the Mariners.
- June 4: 1996 MLB draft
  - Gil Meche was drafted by the Mariners in the 1st round (22nd pick). He signed June 9, 1996.
  - Juan Pierre was drafted by the Mariners in the 48th round but did not sign.
  - Sean Spencer was drafted by the Seattle Mariners in the 40th round of the 1996 amateur draft. Player signed August 26, 1996.
- August 1: Greg Pirkl was selected off waivers from the Mariners by the Boston Red Sox.
- August 14: The Mariners traded Roger Blanco to the Atlanta Braves for Mark Whiten.
- August 22: Luis Sojo was selected off waivers from the Mariners by the New York Yankees.
- August 29: The Mariners traded a player to be named later to the Minnesota Twins for Dave Hollins. The Mariners completed the deal by sending David Ortiz to the Twins on September 13.

=== Roster ===
1996 Seattle Mariners
**Roster**
**Pitchers**: 13 Bobby Ayala; 25 Chris Bosio; 22 Rafael Carmona; 37 Norm Charlton; 47 Tim Davis; 35 Scott Ray Davison; 48 Lee Guetterman; 39 Tim Harikkala; 41 Sterling Hitchcock; 32 Edwin Hurtado; 42 Mike Jackson; 51 Randy Johnson; 40 Joe Klink; 40 Greg McCarthy; 43 Rusty Meacham; 16 Paul Menhart; 53 Bob Milacki; 23 Blas Minor; 50 Jamie Moyer; 45 Terry Mulholland; 96 Mac Suzuki; 38 Salomón Torres; 52 Matt Wagner; 46 Bob Wells; 33 Bob Wolcott	**Catchers**: 17 John Marzano; 36 Chris Widger; 6 Dan Wilson; **Infielders**: 28 Joey Cora; 18 Russ Davis; 10 Dave Hollins; 34 Brian Hunter; 29 Ricky Jordan; 10 Jeff Manto; 11 Edgar Martínez; 20 Greg Pirkl; 3 Alex Rodriguez; 30 Andy Sheets; 9 Luis Sojo; 44 Paul Sorrento; 12 Doug Strange	**Outfielders**: 8 Rich Amaral; 56 Darren Bragg; 19 Jay Buhner; 1 Alex Diaz; 24 Ken Griffey Jr.; 40 Manny Martínez; 20 Mark Whiten; **Other batters**: 26 Raúl Ibáñez	**Manager**: 14 Lou Piniella; **Coaches**: 5 Bobby Cuellar; 4 Lee Elia; 7 John McLaren; 49 Sam Mejías; 2 Steve Smith; 15 Matt Sinatro

== Player stats ==
= Indicates team leader

= Indicates league leader

=== Batting ===
==== Starters by position ====
Note: Pos = Position; G = Games played; AB = At bats; H = Hits; Avg. = Batting average; HR = Home runs; RBI = Runs batted in

Pos	Player	G	AB	H	Avg.	HR	RBI
C	Dan Wilson	138	491	140	.285	18	83
1B	Paul Sorrento	143	471	136	.289	23	93
2B	Joey Cora	144	530	154	.291	6	45
SS	Alex Rodriguez	146	601	215	.358	36	123
3B	Russ Davis	51	167	39	.234	5	18
LF	Rich Amaral	118	312	91	.292	1	29
CF	Ken Griffey Jr.	140	545	165	.303	49	140
RF	Jay Buhner	150	564	153	.271	44	138
DH	Edgar Martínez	139	499	163	.327	26	103

==== Other batters ====
Note: G = Games played; AB = At bats; H = Hits; Avg. = Batting average; HR = Home runs; RBI = Runs batted in

Player	G	AB	H	Avg.	HR	RBI
Luis Sojo	77	247	52	.211	1	16
Brian Hunter	75	198	53	.268	7	28
Darren Bragg	69	195	53	.272	7	25
Doug Strange	88	183	43	.235	3	23
Mark Whiten	40	140	42	.300	12	33
Andy Sheets	47	110	21	.191	0	9
John Marzano	41	106	26	.245	0	6
Dave Hollins	28	94	33	.351	3	25
Alex Diaz	38	79	19	.241	1	5
Jeff Manto	21	54	10	.185	1	4
Ricky Jordan	15	28	7	.250	1	4
Greg Pirkl	7	21	4	.190	1	1
Manny Martinez	9	17	4	.235	0	3
Chris Widger	8	11	2	.182	0	0
Raúl Ibañez	4	5	0	.000	0	0

=== Pitching ===
==== Starting pitchers ====
Note: G = Games pitched; IP = Innings pitched; W = Wins; L = Losses; ERA = Earned run average; SO = Strikeouts

Player	G	IP	W	L	ERA	SO
Sterling Hitchcock	35	196.2	13	9	5.35	132
Bob Wolcott	30	149.1	7	10	5.73	78
Matt Wagner	15	80.0	3	5	6.86	41
Jamie Moyer	11	70.2	6	2	3.31	29
Terry Mulholland	12	69.1	5	4	4.67	34
Tim Harikkala	1	4.1	0	1	12.46	1

==== Other pitchers ====
Note: G = Games pitched; IP = Innings pitched; W = Wins; L = Losses; ERA = Earned run average; SO = Strikeouts

Player	G	IP	W	L	ERA	SO
Bob Wells	36	130.2	12	7	5.30	94
Randy Johnson	14	61.1	5	0	3.67	85
Chris Bosio	18	60.2	4	4	5.93	39
Salomón Torres	10	49.0	3	3	4.59	36
Edwin Hurtado	16	47.2	2	5	7.74	36
Rusty Meacham	15	42.1	1	1	5.74	25
Paul Menhart	11	42.0	2	2	7.29	18
Bob Milacki	7	21.0	1	4	6.86	13

==== Relief pitchers ====
Note: G = Games pitched; W = Wins; L = Losses; SV = Saves; ERA = Earned run average; SO = Strikeouts

Player	G	W	L	SV	ERA	SO
Norm Charlton	70	4	7	20	4.04	73
Mike Jackson	73	1	1	6	3.63	70
Rafael Carmona	53	8	3	1	4.28	62
Bobby Ayala	50	6	3	3	5.88	61
Tim Davis	40	2	2	0	4.01	34
Lee Guetterman	17	0	2	0	4.09	6
Blas Minor	11	0	1	0	4.97	14
Greg McCarthy	10	0	0	0	1.86	7
Scott Ray Davison	5	0	0	0	9.00	9
Joe Klink	3	0	0	0	3.86	2
Mac Suzuki	1	0	0	0	20.25	1

== Awards and honors ==
Alex Rodriguez became the first shortstop in 56 years to lead the American League (AL) in batting average.

Rodriguez and Ken Griffey Jr. won Silver Slugger Awards, and Griffey and Jay Buhner won Gold Glove Awards for their outfield defense. Rodriguez and Griffey led the AL in Wins Above Replacement but finished second and fourth, respectively, in Most Valuable Player voting.

The Mariners had five MLB All-Stars: Rodriguez, Griffey, Buhner, Edgar Martínez, and Dan Wilson.

== Farm system ==
Level	Team	League	Manager
AAA	Tacoma Rainiers	Pacific Coast League	Dave Myers
AA	Port City Roosters	Southern League	Orlando Gómez
A	Lancaster JetHawks	California League	Dave Brundage
A	Wisconsin Timber Rattlers	Midwest League	Mike Goff
A-Short Season	Everett AquaSox	Northwest League	Roger Hansen
Rookie	AZL Mariners	Arizona League	Tom LeVasseur
