= 1995 Seattle Mariners season =

1995 Seattle Mariners
- American League West champions
- League: American League
- Division: West
- Ballpark: Kingdome
- City: Seattle, Washington
- Record: 79–66 (.545)
- Divisional place: 1st
- Owner: Nintendo of America (represented by John Ellis)
- General manager: Woody Woodward
- Manager: Lou Piniella
- Television: KIRO-TV 7 KSTW-TV 11; Prime Sports NW
- Radio: KIRO 710 AM (Dave Niehaus, Rick Rizzs, Chip Caray, Ron Fairly)

The 1995 Seattle Mariners season was the 19th in the history of the franchise. The team finished with a regular season record of 79–66 (.545) to win their first American League (AL) West title, after having been down by as many as 13 games in early August. They were tied the California Angels for first place at the end of the 144-game season. In a one-game tiebreaker, the Mariners defeated the Angels 9–1 to make the postseason for the first time in franchise history.

In the postseason, the Mariners defeated the New York Yankees in the best-of-five AL Division Series after losing the first two games in New York. The series ended on Edgar Martínez' walk-off 11th-inning double. In the AL Championship Series against the favored Cleveland Indians, Seattle won the opener at home and the third game on the road but fell in six games.

== Offseason ==
=== Notable transactions ===
- October 14, 1994: Alex Diaz was selected off waivers by the Mariners from the Milwaukee Brewers.
- November 29: Félix Fermín signed as a free agent with the Mariners.
- November 29: Jeff Darwin designated for assignment.
- December 19: Luis Sojo signed a one-year contract.
- December 21: Jay Buhner re-signed with the Mariners on a three-year contract.
- December 21: Eric Anthony was released by the Mariners.

=== Offseason summary ===
On November 30, 1994, the Mariners became the first MLB team to publish an official website, called "Seattle Mariners Home Plate".

The start of the 1995 season was delayed by the ongoing players strike, which had ended the 1994 season in August. As the strike continued, the Mariners and all MLB teams began spring training with replacement players. In late March, the Mariners had provisional rosters of replacement players that included a few strikebreaking former MLB players, including Jim Paciorek, Marty Pevey, and Randy McCament. However, the strike ended on April 2, the day before replacement players were scheduled to start the regular season. A shortened 144-game MLB season started on April 26, with the Mariners' Opening Day the following night.

== Regular season ==
=== Season standings ===
AL West
Team	W	L	Pct.	GB	Home	Road
Seattle Mariners	79	66	.545	—	46‍–‍27	33‍–‍39
California Angels	78	67	.538	1	39‍–‍33	39‍–‍34
Texas Rangers	74	70	.514	4½	41‍–‍31	33‍–‍39
Oakland Athletics	67	77	.465	11½	38‍–‍34	29‍–‍43

Note: Teams played 144 games instead of the normal 162 as a consequence of the 1994–95 strike.
Seattle and California each played 145 games due to the one-game tiebreaker.

=== Record vs. opponents ===
1995 American League record Source: MLB Standings Grid – 1995
Team	BAL	BOS	CAL	CWS	CLE	DET	KC	MIL	MIN	NYY	OAK	SEA	TEX	TOR
Baltimore	—	4–9	9–4	6–1	2–10	8–5	4–5	7–5	3–6	6–7	5–7	6–7	4–1	7–6
Boston	9–4	—	11–3	5–3	6–7	8–5	3–2	8–4	5–4	5–8	8–4	7–5	3–4	8–5
California	4–9	3–11	—	10–2	3–2	6–2	5–7	5–2	8–5	7–5	6–7	7–6	6–7	8–2
Chicago	1–6	3–5	2–10	—	5–8	8–4	8–5	6–7	10–3	3–2–1	7–5	4–9	5–7	6–5
Cleveland	10–2	7–6	2–3	8–5	—	10–3	11–1	9–4	9–4	6–6	7–0	5–4	6–3	10–3
Detroit	5–8	5–8	2–6	4–8	3–10	—	3–4	8–5	7–5	5–8	2–3	5–5	4–8	7–6
Kansas City	5–4	2–3	7–5	5–8	1–11	4–3	—	10–2	6–7	3–7	5–8	7–5	8–6	7–5
Milwaukee	5–7	4–8	2–5	7–6	4–9	5–8	2–10	—	9–4	5–6	7–2	3–2	5–7	7–5
Minnesota	6–3	4–5	5–8	3–10	4–9	5–7	7–6	4–9	—	3–4	5–7	4–8	5–8	1–4
New York	7–6	8–5	5–7	2–3–1	6–6	8–5	7–3	6–5	4–3	—	4–9	4–9	6–3	12–1
Oakland	7–5	4–8	7–6	5–7	0–7	3–2	8–5	2–7	7–5	9–4	—	7–6	5–8	3–7
Seattle	7–6	5–7	6–7	9–4	4–5	5–5	5–7	2–3	8–4	9–4	6–7	—	10–3	3–4
Texas	1–4	4–3	7–6	7–5	3–6	8–4	6–8	7–5	8–5	3–6	8–5	3–10	—	9–3
Toronto	6–7	5–8	2–8	5–6	3–10	6–7	5–7	5–7	4–1	1–12	7–3	4–3	3–9	—

=== Opening Day starting lineup ===
No.	Player	Pos.
Batters
34	Darren Bragg	LF
28	Joey Cora	2B
24	Ken Griffey Jr.	CF
19	Jay Buhner	RF
11	Edgar Martínez	DH
23	Tino Martinez	1B
16	Mike Blowers	3B
6	Dan Wilson	C
10	Félix Fermín	SS
Starting pitcher
51	Randy Johnson	

=== Season summary ===
- Ken Griffey Jr. suffered a severe left wrist injury on May 26 while making a catch at the wall that sidelined him until mid-August. The Mariners stayed afloat at around .500, and their historic late season comeback tied the California Angels.
- The Mariners honored the West Coast Negro Baseball Association Seattle Steelheads when they wore 1946 Steelheads uniforms on September 9 against the Kansas City Royals. The Royals wore Kansas City Monarchs uniforms. The Mariners beat the Royals 6–2 at the Kingdome.
- Randy Johnson won his first Cy Young Award. The award came at the end of a banner year: Johnson (18–2, 2.48 ERA, 294 strikeouts) narrowly missed becoming the first AL pitching Triple Crown winner since Detroit's Hal Newhouser in 1945. Johnson's .900 winning percentage broke Ron Guidry's 1978 record, and his strikeouts per nine innings ratio of 12.35 broke Nolan Ryan's single-season record.

==== Pennant chase ====
On August 21, the Mariners (53–53 (.500)) were 12½ games behind the California Angels (66–41 (.617)). Two weeks later, the lead narrowed to 5½ games, as the Angels went 1–12 while the Mariners were 8–5. After another two weeks, the lead was down to three games, and the teams were even at 72–63 (.533) on the morning of September 21. Seattle led by as many as 3 games. On September 30, with two games left in season, the Mariners only needed one win to clinch their first playoff appearance in franchise history but couldn't hold it, as they lost their final two games at the Texas Rangers. The Angels won their final five games to tie the Mariners at 78–66 (.542), requiring a one-game playoff for the division title. Also on a five-game winning streak, the New York Yankees secured the new wild card berth at 79–65 (.549).

=== Game log ===
==== Regular season ====
1995 game log: 79–66 (Home: 46–27; Away: 33–39)
April: 3–1 (Home: 3–1; Away: 0–0)

#	Date	Opponent	Score	Win	Loss	Save	Attendance	Record	Streak
1	April 27	Tigers	3–0	**Johnson** (1–0)	Bergman (0–1)	**Ayala** (1)	34,656	1–0	W1
2	April 28	Tigers	9–2	**Bosio** (1–0)	Doherty (0–1)	—	19,336	2–0	W2
3	April 29	Tigers	11–1	**Fleming** (1–0)	D. Wells (0–1)	**Converse** (1)	27,264	3–0	W3
4	April 30	Tigers	1–10	Moore (2–0)	**B. Wells** (0–1)	—	19,743	3–1	L1

May: 16–12 (Home: 9–3; Away: 7–9)

#	Date	Opponent	Score	Win	Loss	Save	Attendance	Record	Streak
5	May 1	@ Rangers	4–1	**Davis** (1–0)	Rogers (0–2)	**Ayala** (2)	19,104	4–1	W1
6	May 2	@ Rangers	15–3	**Nelson** (1–0)	Heredia (0–1)	—	17,983	5–1	W2
7	May 3	@ Rangers	5–1	**Bosio** (2–0)	Pavlik (0–1)	—	17,375	6–1	W3
8	May 5	@ Angels	0–10	Patterson (1–0)	**Fleming** (1–1)	—	30,230	6–2	L1
9	May 6	@ Angels	5–7	Williams (1–1)	**Wells** (0–2)	L. Smith (4)	21,882	6–3	L2
10	May 7	@ Angels	3–2	**Johnson** (2–0)	Finley (0–3)	**Ayala** (3)	24,868	7–3	W1
11	May 9	@ Athletics	5–7	Wengert (1–1)	**Converse** (0–1)	—	8,125	7–4	L1
12	May 10	@ Athletics	4–7	Ontiveros (2–1)	**Fleming** (1–2)	Eckersley (4)	8,495	7–5	L2
13	May 11	@ Athletics	1–3	Harkey (1–1)	**Villone** (0–1)	Eckersley (5)	9,444	7–6	L3
14	May 12	White Sox	6–4	**Johnson** (3–0)	Alvarez (1–2)	**Risley** (1)	18,166	8–6	W1
15	May 13	White Sox	6–5	**Davis** (2–0)	Fernandez (1–2)	**Ayala** (4)	40,653	9–6	W2
16	May 14	White Sox	2–10	Abbott (2–1)	**Converse** (0–2)	—	19,475	9–7	L1
17	May 16	@ Royals	2–4 (5)	Haney (1–0)	**Fleming** (1–3)	—	12,330	9–8	L2
18	May 17	@ Royals	4–0	**Wells** (1–2)	Gubicza (1–3)	—	12,020	10–8	W1
19	May 18	@ Royals	2–3 (14)	Brewer (1–1)	**Converse** (0–3)	—	14,793	10–9	L1
20	May 19	@ Twins	6–8	Radke (2–1)	**Davis** (2–1)	Aguilera (6)	14,639	10–10	L2
21	May 20	@ Twins	10–6	**Belcher** (1–0)	Erickson (1–4)	—	13,762	11–10	W1
22	May 21	@ Twins	5–2	**Johnson** (4–0)	Tapani (2–2)	**Ayala** (5)	12,918	12–10	W2
23	May 22	@ Tigers	8–10	Boever (3–0)	**Carmona** (0–1)	Henneman (4)	9,167	12–11	L1
24	May 23	Red Sox	4–5 (10)	Belinda (3–0)	**Frey** (0–2)	Ryan (3)	11,868	12–12	L2
25	May 24	Red Sox	15–6	**Carmona** (1–1)	Pierce (0–3)	**Nelson** (1)	10,041	13–12	W1
26	May 25	Red Sox	4–3	**Belcher** (2–0)	Z. Smith (0–1)	**Ayala** (6)	12,194	14–12	W2
27	May 26	Orioles	8–3	**Johnson** (5–0)	McDonald (0–2)	—	15,256	15–12	W3
28	May 27	Orioles	4–11	Mills (3–0)	**Wells** (1–3)	—	20,797	15–13	L1
29	May 28	Orioles	5–2	**Bosio** (3–0)	Brown (4–2)	**Ayala** (7)	16,785	16–13	W1
30	May 29	Yankees	8–7 (12)	**Ayala** (1–0)	Bankhead (1–1)	—	18,948	17–13	W2
31	May 30	Yankees	7–3	**Nelson** (2–0)	Perez (2–2)	—	10,709	18–13	W3
32	May 31	Yankees	11–9	**Wells** (2–3)	MacDonald (0–1)	**Ayala** (8)	13,035	19–13	W4

June: 11–17 (Home: 5–9; Away: 6–8)

#	Date	Opponent	Score	Win	Loss	Save	Attendance	Record	Streak
33	June 2	@ Red Sox	5–6	Belinda (4–0)	**Torres** (0–2)	—	33,476	19–14	L1
34	June 3	@ Red Sox	8–10	Cormier (2–0)	**Carmona** (1–2)	Ryan (6)	27,301	19–15	L2
35	June 4	@ Red Sox	1–2 (10)	Wakefield (3–0)	**Ayala** (1–1)	—	28,512	19–16	L3
36	June 5	@ Orioles	2–0	**Johnson** (6–0)	McDonald (1–3)	—	36,732	20–16	W1
37	June 6	@ Orioles	6–12	Moyer (1–1)	**Fleming** (1–4)	—	33,556	20–17	L1
38	June 7	@ Orioles	10–2	**Bosio** (4–0)	Brown (5–3)	—	38,407	21–17	W1
39	June 8	@ Orioles	2–8	Mussina (5–3)	**Torres** (0–3)	—	40,730	21–18	L1
40	June 9	@ Yankees	11–1	**Belcher** (3–0)	Perez (3–3)	—	19,650	22–18	W1
41	June 10	@ Yankees	3–2	**Nelson** (3–0)	Howe (1–2)	**Ayala** (9)	25,279	23–18	W2
42	June 11	@ Yankees	7–10	Howe (2–2)	**Frey** (0–3)	Wetteland (7)	26,037	23–19	L1
43	June 12	Royals	9–10	Meacham (2–2)	**Villone** (0–2)	Montgomery (9)	11,628	23–20	L2
44	June 13	Royals	1–3	Haney (3–1)	**Torres** (0–4)	Montgomery (10)	10,223	23–21	L3
45	June 14	Royals	1–2	Appier (9–2)	**Belcher** (3–1)	Montgomery (11)	12,585	23–22	L4
46	June 16	Twins	1–10	Radke (3–6)	**Johnson** (6–1)	—	20,762	23–23	L5
47	June 17	Twins	6–4	**Bosio** (5–0)	Trombley (0–2)	**Ayala** (10)	16,751	24–23	W1
48	June 18	Twins	2–1	**Risley** (1–0)	Tapani (4–6)	—	24,707	25–23	W2
49	June 19	@ White Sox	6–8	McCaskill (3–2)	**Fleming** (1–5)	Hernandez (11)	22,406	25–24	L1
50	June 20	@ White Sox	9–5	**Johnson** (7–1)	Alvarez (1–2)	—	25,868	26–24	W1
51	June 21	@ White Sox	4–5 (10)	McCaskill (4–2)	**Risley** (1–1)	—	21,228	26–25	L1
52	June 22	@ White Sox	3–2	**Torres** (1–4)	Abbott (3–3)	**Ayala** (11)	20,836	27–25	W1
53	June 23	Angels	4–14	Langston (6–1)	**Belcher** (3–2)	—	14,282	27–26	L1
54	June 24	Angels	3–2	**Johnson** (8–1)	Finley (5–6)	—	31,275	28–26	W1
55	June 25	Angels	5–7	Boskie (6–1)	**Bosio** (5–1)	Smith (19)	14,325	28–27	L1
56	June 26	Angels	7–3	**Torres** (2–4)	Anderson (1–1)	—	18,126	29–27	W1
57	June 27	Athletics	4–6	Harkey (4–4)	**Belcher** (3–3)	Eckersley (16)	9,767	29–28	L1
58	June 28	Athletics	5–7	Van Poppel (1–1)	**Nelson** (3–1)	—	15,165	29–29	L2
59	June 29	Athletics	5–2	**Bosio** (6–1)	Arce (1–2)	**Ayala** (12)	13,701	30–29	W1
60	June 30	Rangers	2–10	Gross (3–7)	**Torres** (2–5)	—	12,137	30–30	L1

July: 13–14 (Home: 8–7; Away: 5–7)

#	Date	Opponent	Score	Win	Loss	Save	Attendance	Record	Streak
61	July 1	Rangers	2–0	**Belcher** (4–3)	Pavlik (4–4)	**Ayala** (13)	17,323	31–30	W1
62	July 2	Rangers	4–3	**Ayala** (2–1)	Whiteside (2–2)	—	19,404	32–30	W2
63	July 3	@ Tigers	2–4	D. Wells (7–3)	**Bosio** (6–2)	Henneman (15)	23,780	32–31	L1
64	July 4	@ Tigers	8–9	Christopher (1–0)	**Ayala** (2–2)	—	20,188	32–32	L2
65	July 5	@ Tigers	6–8	Christopher (2–0)	**Carmona** (1–3)	Henneman (16)	17,224	32–33	L3
66	July 6	@ Indians	1–8	Ogea (5–1)	**Belcher** (4–4)	—	41,661	32–34	L4
67	July 7	@ Indians	5–3	**Johnson** (9–1)	Clark (4–3)	—	41,741	33–34	W1
68	July 8	@ Indians	3–7	Nagy (7–4)	**Bosio** (6–3)	—	41,893	33–35	L1
69	July 9	@ Indians	9–3	**Torres** (3–5)	Hershiser (5–4)	—	41,897	34–35	W1
-	July 11	**66th All-Star Game in Arlington, TX**							
70	July 13	Blue Jays	1–4	Cone (8–5)	**Belcher** (4–5)	Castillo (4)	18,616	34–36	L1
71	July 14	Blue Jays	1–5	Guzman (3–5)	**Bosio** (6–4)	—	14,850	34–37	L2
72	July 15	Blue Jays	3–0	**Johnson** (10–1)	Hentgen (6–7)	—	36,037	35–37	W1
73	July 16	Blue Jays	3–9	Hurtado (1–0)	**Carmona** (1–4)	—	17,632	35–38	L1
74	July 17	Tigers	10–6 (10)	**Ayala** (3–2)	Groom (1–3)	—	14,358	36–38	W1
75	July 18	Tigers	10–6	**Belcher** (5–5)	Lima (0–1)	—	14,667	37–38	W2
76	July 19	@ Brewers	6–7 (12)	Wegman (3–3)	**Ayala** (3–3)	—	14,175	37–39	L1
77	July 20	@ Brewers	4–2 (13)	**Krueger** (1–0)	McAndrew (0–1)	—	21,211	38–39	W1
78	July 21	@ Blue Jays	3–4	Hurtado (2–0)	**Torres** (3–6)	Castillo (6)	36,490	38–40	L1
79	July 22	@ Blue Jays	7–2	**Belcher** (6–5)	Leiter (6–6)	—	43,483	39–40	W1
80	July 23	@ Blue Jays	6–4	**B. Wells** (3–3)	Cone (9–6)	**Ayala** (14)	39,163	40–40	W2
81	July 24	Brewers	4–6	Bones (6–7)	**Bosio** (6–5)	Fetters (13)	10,491	40–41	L1
82	July 25	Brewers	8–6	**Johnson** (11–1)	Karl (1–1)	**Ayala** (15)	13,427	41–41	W1
83	July 26	Brewers	3–4	Givens (2–2)	**Torres** (3–7)	Fetters (14)	11,315	41–42	L1
84	July 27	Indians	11–5	**Belcher** (7–5)	Ogea (5–3)	—	20,121	42–42	W1
85	July 28	Indians	5–6	Plunk (5–1)	**Frey** (0–4)	Mesa (28)	17,609	42–43	L1
86	July 29	Indians	5–3	**Bosio** (7–5)	Embree (2–1)	**Ayala** (16)	43,874	43–43	W1
87	July 30	Indians	2–5	Hershiser (8–5)	**Torres** (3–8)	Mesa (29)	24,089	43–44	L1

August: 16–13 (Home: 8–5; Away: 8–8)

#	Date	Opponent	Score	Win	Loss	Save	Attendance	Record	Streak
88	August 1	@ Angels	2–7	Anderson (6–2)	**Johnson** (11–2)	—	22,074	43–45	L2
89	August 2	@ Angels	4–5	Harkey (6–6)	**Belcher** (7–6)	Smith (25)	23,253	43–46	L3
90	August 3	@ Angels	10–7	**Benes** (5–7)	Abbott (7–5)	**Charlton** (1)	34,674	44–46	W1
91	August 4	@ Athletics	8–9	Eckersley (3–4)	**Ayala** (3–4)	—	11,794	44–47	L1
92	August 5	@ Athletics	15–9	**Wells** (4–3)	Briscoe (0–1)	—	20,787	45–47	W1
93	August 6	@ Athletics	15–8	**Krueger** (2–0)	Stottlemyre (9–4)	—	20,368	46–47	W2
94	August 7	White Sox	6–4	**Belcher** (8–6)	Alvarez (4–7)	**Charlton** (2)	18,852	47–47	W3
95	August 8	White Sox	10–9	**Ayala** (4–4)	Hernandez (2–5)	—	16,875	48–47	W4
96	August 9	White Sox	11–8	**Bosio** (8–5)	Keyser (3–5)	**Ayala** (17)	16,401	49–47	W5
97	August 11	@ Royals	2–1	**Johnson** (12–2)	Gubicza (8–10)	**Ayala** (18)	19,955	50–47	W6
98	August 12	@ Royals	2–7	Appier (12–7)	**Belcher** (8–7)	Meacham (1)	20,572	50–48	L1
99	August 13	@ Royals	3–6	Gordon (8–7)	**Krueger** (2–1)	Montgomery (20)	19,489	50–49	L2
100	August 14	@ Twins	6–2	**Benes** (6–7)	Trombley (2–7)	**Nelson** (2)	16,637	51–49	W1
101	August 15	@ Twins	6–7	Munoz (1–0)	**Ayala** (4–5)	—	12,595	51–50	L1
102	August 16	@ Twins	6–4	**Risley** (2–1)	Stevens (3–2)	**Ayala** (19)	13,426	52–50	W1
103	August 17	@ Athletics	2–3	Honeycutt (5–1)	**Charlton** (2–6)	—	10,191	52–51	L1
104	August 18	Red Sox	9–3	**Wolcott** (1–0)	Wakefield (14–2)	—	27,256	53–51	W1
105	August 19	Red Sox	3–4	Hanson (12–4)	**Benes** (6–8)	Aguilera (21)	36,007	53–52	L1
106	August 20	Red Sox	6–7	Cormier (6–3)	**Bosio** (8–6)	Aguilera (22)	21,813	53–53	L2
107	August 21	Orioles	6–0	**Nelson** (4–1)	Benitez (1–5)	—	32,525	54–53	W1
108	August 22	Orioles	1–2	Mussina (14–7)	**Belcher** (8–8)	Jones (20)	13,631	54–54	L1
109	August 23	Orioles	1–7	Krivda (2–2)	**Wolcott** (1–1)	Benitez (2)	14,937	54–55	L2
110	August 24	Yankees	9–7	**Nelson** (5–1)	Wetteland (1–4)	—	17,592	55–55	W1
111	August 25	Yankees	7–4	**Bosio** (9–6)	Pettitte (6–8)	—	28,130	56–55	W2
112	August 26	Yankees	7–0	**Johnson** (13–2)	Hitchcock (6–9)	—	41,182	57–55	W3
113	August 27	Yankees	2–5	Kamieniecki (4–5)	**Belcher** (8–9)	Wetteland (23)	24,913	57–56	L1
114	August 29	@ Red Sox	6–4	**Benes** (7–8)	Wakefield (14–3)	**Charlton** (3)	31,328	58–56	W1
115	August 30	@ Red Sox	6–7	Maddux (4–1)	**Nelson** (5–2)	Aguilera (26)	32,356	58–57	L1
116	August 31	@ Red Sox	11–2	**Wolcott** (2–1)	Cormier (6–5)	**Guetterman** (1)	30,627	59–57	W1

September: 19–8 (Home: 12–2; Away: 7–6)

#	Date	Opponent	Score	Win	Loss	Save	Attendance	Record	Streak
117	September 1	@ Orioles	4–3	**Belcher** (9–9)	Mussina (15–8)	**Charlton** (4)	43,447	60–57	W2
118	September 2	@ Orioles	2–3	Brown (7–8)	**Bosio** (9–7)	Jones (21)	46,731	60–58	L1
119	September 3	@ Orioles	9–6	**Carmona** (2–4)	Krivda (2–3)	**Charlton** (5)	46,269	61–58	W1
120	September 4	@ Yankees	3–13	Pettitte (8–8)	**Torres** (3–9)	—	24,855	61–59	L1
121	September 5	@ Yankees	6–5	**Wolcott** (3–1)	Rivera (5–3)	**Charlton** (6)	15,340	62–59	W1
122	September 6	@ Yankees	3–4	McDowell (13–10)	**Belcher** (9–10)	—	15,426	62–60	L1
123	September 7	@ Indians	1–4	Nagy (13–5)	**Bosio** (9–8)	Mesa (39)	41,450	62–61	L2
124	September 8	Royals	4–1	**Johnson** (14–2)	Jacome (4–7)	**Charlton** (7)	19,350	63–61	W1
125	September 9	Royals	6–2	**Benes** (8–8)	Gubicza (10–13)	—	39,157	64–61	W2
126	September 10	Royals	5–4	**Ayala** (5–5)	Olson (3–2)	**Charlton** (8)	18,066	65–61	W3
127	September 11	Twins	10–12	Mahomes (4–7)	**Nelson** (5–3)	Stevens (9)	18,193	65–62	L1
128	September 12	Twins	14–3	**Bosio** (10–8)	Rodriguez (5–6)	**Carmona** (1)	12,102	66–62	W1
129	September 13	Twins	7–4	**Nelson** (6–3)	Mahomes (4–8)	**Charlton** (9)	16,469	67–62	W2
130	September 15	@ White Sox	3–2	**Benes** (9–8)	Bere (7–13)	**Charlton** (10)	19,100	68–62	W3
131	September 16	@ White Sox	5–3	**Belcher** (10–10)	Karchner (3–2)	**Charlton** (11)	26,073	69–62	W4
132	September 17	@ White Sox	1–2	McCaskill (5–4)	**Wolcott** (3–2)	Hernandez (30)	21,913	69–63	L1
133	September 18	Rangers	8–1	**Johnson** (15–2)	Witt (5–10)	—	29,515	70–63	W1
134	September 19	Rangers	5–4 (11)	**Charlton** (3–6)	McDowell (6–4)	—	20,410	71–63	W2
135	September 20	Rangers	11–3	**Benes** (10–8)	Tewksbury (8–7)	—	26,524	72–63	W3
136	September 22	Athletics	10–7	**Nelson** (7–3)	Corsi (2–4)	**Charlton** (12)	51,500	73–63	W4
137	September 23	Athletics	7–0	**Johnson** (16–2)	Johns (5–2)	—	54,589	74–63	W5
138	September 24	Athletics	9–8	**Charlton** (4–6)	Eckersley (4–6)	—	46,714	75–63	W6
139	September 26	Angels	10–2	**Benes** (11–8)	Boskie (7–7)	—	46,935	76–63	W7
140	September 27	Angels	0–2	Finley (14–12)	**Belcher** (10–11)	Smith (35)	50,212	76–64	L1
141	September 28	@ Rangers	6–2	**Johnson** (17–2)	Pavlik (10–10)	**Charlton** (13)	21,502	77–64	W1
142	September 29	@ Rangers	4–3	**Ayala** (6–5)	Vosberg (5–5)	**Charlton** (14)	25,336	78–64	W2
143	September 30	@ Rangers	2–9	Gross (9–15)	**Benes** (11–9)	—	33,792	78–65	L1

October: 1–1 (Home: 1–0; Away: 0–1)

#	Date	Opponent	Score	Win	Loss	Save	Attendance	Record	Streak
144	October 1	@ Rangers	3–9	Rogers (17–7)	**Belcher** (10–12)	Whiteside (3)	25,714	78–66	L2
145	October 2	Angels	9–1	**Johnson** (18–2)	Langston (15–7)	—	52,356	79–66	W1

Legend: = Win = Loss = Postponement
Bold = Mariners team member

==== Postseason ====
1995 Postseason game log (5–6) (Home: 4–2; Away: 1–4)
American League Division Series: 3–2 (Home: 3–0; Away 0–2)

#	Date	Opponent	Stadium	Score	Win	Loss	Save	Attendance	Record
1	October 3	@ Yankees	Yankee Stadium	6–9	Cone (1–0)	**Nelson** (0–1)	—	57,178	0–1
2	October 4	@ Yankees	Yankee Stadium	5–7 (15)	Rivera (1–0)	**Belcher** (0–1)	—	57,126	0–2
3	October 6	Yankees	**Kingdome**	7–4	**Johnson** (1–0)	McDowell (0–1)	**Charlton** (1)	57,944	1–2
4	October 7	Yankees	**Kingdome**	11–8	**Charlton** (1–0)	Wetteland (0–1)	**Risley** (1)	57,180	2–2
5	October 8	Yankees	**Kingdome**	6–5 (11)	**Johnson** (2–0)	McDowell (0–2)	—	57,411	3–2

American League Championship Series: 2–4 (Home: 1–2; Away 1–2)

#	Date	Opponent	Stadium	Score	Win	Loss	Save	Attendance	Record
1	October 10	Indians	**Kingdome**	3–2	**Wolcott** (1–0)	Martinez (0–1)	**Charlton** (1)	57,065	1–0
2	October 11	Indians	**Kingdome**	2–5	Hershiser (1–0)	**Belcher** (0–1)	—	58,144	1–1
3	October 13	@ Indians	Jacobs Field	5–2 (11)	**Charlton** (1–0)	Tavarez (0–1)	—	43,643	2–1
4	October 14	@ Indians	Jacobs Field	0–7	Hill (1–0)	**Benes** (0–1)	—	43,686	2–2
5	October 15	@ Indians	Jacobs Field	2–3	Hershiser (2–0)	**Bosio** (0–1)	Mesa (1)	43,607	2–3
6	October 17	Indians	**Kingdome**	0–4	Martinez (1–1)	**Johnson** (0–1)	—	58,489	2–4

== Roster ==
1995 Seattle Mariners
Roster
Pitchers: 13 Bobby Ayala; 31 Tim Belcher; 40 Andy Benes; 25 Chris Bosio; 22 Rafael Carmona; 37 Norm Charlton; 32 Jim Converse; 44 John Cummings; 47 Tim Davis; 35 Scott Ray Davison; 35 Dave Fleming; 41 Steve Frey; 48 Lee Guetterman; 39 Tim Harikkala; 51 Randy Johnson; 50 Kevin King; 44 Bill Krueger; 42 Jim Mecir; 43 Jeff Nelson; 55 Bill Risley; 38 Salomón Torres; 33 Ron Villone; 46 Bob Wells; 33 Bob Wolcott	Catchers: 18 Chad Kreuter; 36 Chris Widger; 6 Dan Wilson; Infielders: 16 Mike Blowers; 28 Joey Cora; 10 Félix Fermín; 11 Edgar Martínez; 23 Tino Martinez; 20 Greg Pirkl; 41 Arquimedez Pozo; 3 Alex Rodriguez; 9 Luis Sojo; 12 Doug Strange	Outfielders: 8 Rich Amaral; 40,34 Darren Bragg; 19 Jay Buhner; 29 Vince Coleman; 1 Alex Diaz; 24 Ken Griffey Jr.; 27 Marc Newfield; 29,26 Warren Newson; 32 Gary Thurman	Manager: 14 Lou Piniella; Coaches: 5 Bobby Cuellar; 4 Lee Elia; 7 John McLaren; 49 Sam Mejías; 2 Sam Perlozzo; 17 Matt Sinatro

=== Notable transactions ===
- May 15, 1995: Roger Salkeld was traded by the Mariners to the Cincinnati Reds for Tim Belcher.
- July 14: Norm Charlton was signed by the Mariners after being released by the Philadelphia Phillies
- July 31: Ron Villone and Marc Newfield were traded by the Mariners to the San Diego Padres for Andy Benes and a player to be named later. The Padres sent Greg Keagle to the Mariners on September 17.
- August 15: The Mariners traded a player to be named later to the Kansas City Royals for Vince Coleman. The Mariners sent Jim Converse to the Royals on August 18.

==== Draft picks ====
- June 1, 1995: 1995 Major League Baseball draft
  - Jose Cruz Jr. was drafted in the first round and signed for $1.285 million.
  - Shane Monahan was drafted by the Mariners in the second round and signed on June 27, 1995.
  - Brian Fuentes was drafted in the 25th round and signed with the Mariners.
  - Juan Pierre was drafted by the Mariners in the 30th round but did not sign.

=== Player stats ===
= Indicates team leader

= Indicates league leader

==== Batting ====
===== Starters by position =====
Note: Pos = Position; G = Games played; AB = At bats; H = Hits; Avg. = Batting average; HR = Home runs; RBI = Runs batted in

Pos	Player	G	AB	H	Avg.	HR	RBI
C	Dan Wilson	119	399	111	.278	9	51
1B	Tino Martinez	141	519	152	.293	31	111
2B	Joey Cora	120	427	127	.297	3	39
3B	Mike Blowers	134	439	113	.257	23	96
SS	Luis Sojo	102	339	98	.289	7	39
LF	Vince Coleman	40	162	47	.290	1	9
CF	Ken Griffey Jr.	72	260	67	.258	17	42
RF	Jay Buhner	126	470	123	.262	40	121
DH	Edgar Martínez	145	511	182	.356	29	113

===== Other batters =====
Note: Pos = Position; G = Games played; AB = At bats; H = Hits; Avg. = Batting average; HR = Home runs; RBI = Runs batted in

Pos	Player	G	AB	H	Avg.	HR	RBI
OF	Alex Diaz	103	270	67	.248	3	27
OF	Rich Amaral	90	230	67	.282	2	19
SS	Félix Fermín	73	200	39	.195	0	15
3B/PH	Doug Strange	74	155	42	.271	2	21
OF	Darren Bragg	52	145	34	.234	3	12
SS	Alex Rodriguez	48	142	33	.232	5	19
LF	Marc Newfield	24	85	16	.188	3	14
C	Chad Kreuter	26	75	17	.227	1	8
LF	Warren Newson	33	72	21	.292	2	6
UT	Chris Widger	23	45	9	.200	1	2
OF	Gary Thurman	13	25	8	.320	0	3
1B	Greg Pirkl	10	17	4	.235	0	0
2B	Arquimedez Pozo	1	1	0	.000	0	0

==== Pitching ====
= Indicates league leader

===== Starting pitchers =====
Note: GS = Games started; IP = Innings pitched; W = Wins; L = Losses; ERA = Earned run average; SO = Strikeouts

Player	GS	IP	W	L	ERA	SO
Randy Johnson	30	214 1/3	18	2	2.48	294
Tim Belcher	28	179 1/3	10	12	4.52	96
Chris Bosio	31	170	10	8	4.92	85
Salomón Torres	13	72	3	8	6.00	45
Andy Benes	12	63	7	2	4.52	45
Bob Wolcott	7	36 2/3	3	2	4.42	19
Tim Davis	5	24	2	1	6.38	19

===== Other pitchers =====
Note: G = Games pitched; IP = Innings pitched; W = Wins; L = Losses; ERA = Earned run average; SO = Strikeouts

Player	G	IP	W	L	ERA	SO
Bob Wells	30	76 2/3	4	3	5.75	38
Dave Fleming	16	48	1	5	7.50	26
Rafael Carmona	15	47 2/3	2	4	5.66	28
Bill Krueger	6	20	2	1	5.85	10
Jim Converse	6	11	0	3	7.36	9

===== Relief pitchers =====
Note: G = Games pitched; IP = Innings pitched; W = Wins; L = Losses; ERA = Earned run average; SO = Strikeouts; SV = Saves

Player	G	IP	W	L	ERA	SO	SV
Bobby Ayala	63	71	6	5	4.44	77	19
Jeff Nelson	62	78 2/3	7	3	2.17	96	2
Bill Risley	45	60 1/3	2	1	3.13	65	1
Norm Charlton	30	47 2/3	2	1	1.51	58	14
Lee Guetterman	23	17	0	0	6.88	11	1
Ron Villone	19	19 1/3	0	2	7.91	26	0
Steve Frey	13	11 1/3	0	3	4.76	7	0
John Cummings	4	5 1/3	0	0	11.81	4	0
Scott Ray Davison	3	4 1/3	0	0	6.23	3	0
Jim Mecir	2	4 2/3	0	0	0.00	3	0
Kevin King	2	3 2/3	0	0	12.27	3	0
Tim Harikkala	1	3 1/3	0	0	16.20	1	0

== Postseason ==
=== ALDS ===
Game	Score	Date
1	Seattle 6, New York 9	October 3, 1995
2	Seattle 5, New York 7	October 4, 1995
3	New York 4, Seattle 7	October 6, 1995
4	New York 8, Seattle 11	October 7, 1995
5	New York 5, Seattle 6	October 8, 1995

=== ALCS ===
Game	Score	Date
1	Cleveland 2, Seattle 3	October 10, 1995
2	Cleveland 5, Seattle 2	October 11, 1995
3	Seattle 5, Cleveland 2	October 13, 1995
4	Seattle 0, Cleveland 7	October 14, 1995
5	Seattle 2, Cleveland 3	October 15, 1995
6	Cleveland 4, Seattle 0	October 17, 1995

== Awards and honors ==
- Randy Johnson, American League (AL) Cy Young Award winner, AL leader in strikeouts
- Edgar Martínez, AL batting champion, Silver Slugger Award
- Lou Piniella, Associated Press AL Manager of the Year

== In popular culture ==
The Mariners' ALDS run is the subject of the song, My Oh My, by Seattle-based rapper, Macklemore.

Chicago-based band Coping has a song titled "'95 Mariners."

In July 2019, the MLB Network released MLB Network Presents: The 1995 Mariners, Saving Baseball in Seattle.

The team's playoff run received a dedicated segment in Jon Bois' docuseries The History of the Seattle Mariners, titled "The Battle for Seattle".

== Farm system ==
Level	Team	League	Manager
AAA	Tacoma Rainiers	Pacific Coast League	Steve Smith
AA	Port City Roosters	Southern League	Dave Myers
A	Riverside Pilots	California League	Dave Brundage
A	Wisconsin Timber Rattlers	Midwest League	Mike Goff
A-Short Season	Everett AquaSox	Northwest League	Orlando Gómez
Rookie	AZL Mariners	Arizona League	Tom LeVasseur
