= Dan Wilson (catcher) =

American baseball player and manager (born 1969)

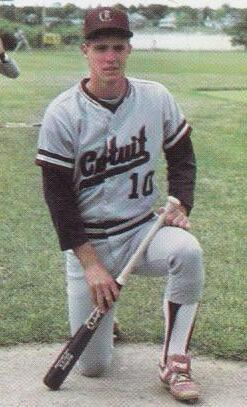
- Wilson with the Cotuit Kettleers in 1988
- Catcher / Manager
- Born: March 25, 1969 (age 57); Barrington, Illinois, U.S.
- Batted: Right Threw: Right

MLB debut
- September 7, 1992, for the Cincinnati Reds

Last MLB appearance
- September 30, 2005, for the Seattle Mariners

MLB statistics
- Batting average: .262
- Home runs: 88
- Runs batted in: 519
- Managerial record: 187–171
- Winning %: .522
- Stats at Baseball Reference
- Managerial record at Baseball Reference

Teams
- As player: Cincinnati Reds (1992–1993); Seattle Mariners (1994–2005); As manager: Seattle Mariners (2024–2026)

Career highlights and awards
- All-Star (1996); Seattle Mariners Hall of Fame
Medals
Men's baseball
Representing United States
World Junior Baseball Championship
Silver medal – second place	1987 Windsor	Team

Daniel Allen Wilson (born March 25, 1969) is an American former professional baseball player and coach who was most recently the manager of the Seattle Mariners of Major League Baseball (MLB). He played in MLB as a catcher from 1992 through 2005. Wilson began his career with the Cincinnati Reds before being traded in late 1993 to the Mariners where he played for 12 of his 14 Major League seasons. He was considered one of the best defensive catchers of his era, retiring with the highest fielding percentage by a catcher in American League history. In 2012, Wilson was inducted into the Seattle Mariners Hall of Fame alongside his battery-mate, Randy Johnson.

Wilson became the Mariners' manager after the team fired Scott Servais on August 22, 2024. Wilson led the team to a division title in his first full season as manager.

== Playing career ==
=== Amateur ===
Wilson led his Barrington, Illinois Little League team to a third-place finish in the 1981 Little League World Series. At Barrington High School, he starred as a pitcher, with a 27–1 win–loss record his final two seasons, and catcher. He was selected in the 26th round of the 1987 MLB draft by the New York Mets. Wilson did not sign, electing to play college baseball.

At the University of Minnesota, Wilson pitched in an NCAA Tournament Regional game his first year in 1988, also batting .347 for the season. That summer, he played summer baseball with the Cotuit Kettleers of the Cape Cod Baseball League. After that summer, he gave up pitching, since he preferred playing catcher and playing every day. In 1989, he was named to the second-team All-Big Ten Conference team with Minnesota, then played for the U.S. Collegiate National Team in the summer, batting .325 in 30 games. In his junior season, Wilson batted .370 and was a first-team All-American. Following his playing career, Wilson was inducted into the Golden Gophers' Hall of Fame in 2008.

=== Cincinnati Reds (1990–1993) ===
Wilson was selected in the first round of the 1990 MLB draft, seventh overall, by the Cincinnati Reds. He signed in time to play 32 games with the Charleston Wheelers of the South Atlantic League. He returned to Charleston to open the 1991 season, batting .315 in 52 games before earning a promotion to Double-A Chattanooga. He started the 1992 season with Nashville in the Triple-A American Association, batting .251 in 106 games there before earning a promotion to the major leagues at age 23 on September 7. Two days later, he hit a single off Tom Glavine for his first MLB hit.

Wilson made the Reds' Opening Day roster in 1993, backing up Joe Oliver. He returned to Triple-A with the new Reds A affiliate, the Indianapolis Indians in July. In parts of two seasons with Cincinnati, he batted .257 with 11 RBI in 48 games.

=== Seattle Mariners (1994–2005) ===
Following the 1993 season, the Reds traded Wilson and pitcher Bobby Ayala to the Seattle Mariners for second baseman Bret Boone and pitcher Erik Hanson. The Mariners made the trade to dump Hanson's salary and add two prospects. Wilson made the Mariners' roster out of spring training in 1994 and became an established major-league player, replacing Dave Valle as the Mariners' primary catcher. In his first game, he picked off a stumbling Manny Ramirez at second base. In his rookie season, Wilson struggled at the plate, batting .216, but he showed signs of his defensive ability with a .986 fielding percentage. That was the lowest fielding percentage he would have as the Mariners' primary catcher. The 1995 season went better for him; he played 119 games, batting .278 and raising his fielding percentage to .995, as the Mariners won the American League (AL) West division for the first time in franchise history. In his first postseason, Wilson batted 2-for-33, going hitless in six AL Championship Series games.

Wilson hit three home runs on April 11, 1996 in Detroit. That July, he made his only All-Star Game. In the 1996 season, Wilson set career highs with 146 games played, 18 home runs, 83 runs batted in, and a .774 on-base plus slugging. He was also featured in the team's television commercials.

Wilson signed a two-year, $6.55 million contract extension in April 1997, lasting through the 1999 season. He was the battery-mate for Mariners pitcher Randy Johnson on June 24, when Johnson struck out 19 batters in a game against the Oakland Athletics, just one strikeout less than the major league single-game record of 20 strikeouts in a 9 inning game. Several weeks later on August 8, Johnson, again throwing to Wilson, struck out 19 Chicago White Sox batters. In 1997, he excelled against left-handed pitching, with a .657 slugging percentage, one of the best in the majors. In Wilson and his team's second playoff appearance, he extended his postseason hitless streak to 10 games as the Mariners lost in the AL Division Series.

On May 3, 1998, Wilson hit an inside-the-park grand slam, an unusual feat for any ballplayer, especially for a catcher. That July, he tore ligaments in his left ankle while chasing after a passed ball, sending him to the disabled list for the first time in his career.

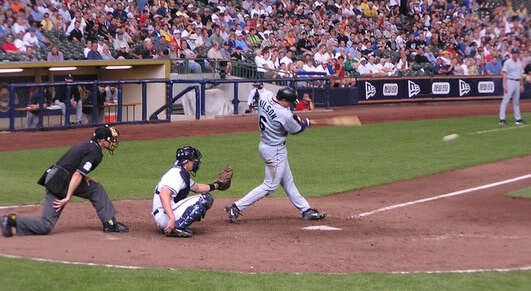
Wilson batting in 2004

Wilson remained a dependable receiver for Mariners pitchers over the next several seasons. In 2000, Wilson's numbers declined to a .235 batting average and .990 fielding percentage; he was also limited to 90 games as a result of injuries. That postseason, he batted 1-for-14, snapping his 0-for-42 postseason slump in the final loss to the New York Yankees in the AL Championship Series. However, he regained his form in 2001, playing 123 games (122 at catcher) and posting a .265 batting average and a .999 fielding percentage, making 1 error all season. In his final playoffs, he batted .179 with a double, his only career postseason extra base hit. He hit career-best .295 in 115 games for the Mariners in 2002. After that season, he signed a two-year, $7 million extension with Seattle. He had a .998 fielding percentage over 96 games in 2003, batting .241 after beginning season on the injured list. In his last full, healthy season, he batted .251 with 33 RBI in 2004.

Before the 2005 season, Miguel Olivo replaced Wilson as Seattle's starting catcher. On May 4, Wilson suffered a torn ACL in his right knee during a game against the Los Angeles Angels of Anaheim. He had considered retiring after the 2005 season, and he announced his retirement, effective at the end of the season, on September 12. Although a torn ACL commonly keeps athletes sidelined for most of a season, Wilson spent most of the rest of the season rehabilitating his knee and was activated from the disabled list on September 30. He came back for one final inning that night against the Oakland Athletics; he had not recovered enough to swing a bat, but he was able to crouch and throw. The Mariners' starting pitcher that night was Jamie Moyer, whom Wilson had caught for 190 previous starts dating back to 1996. Moyer pitched to five batters in the inning, which ended when Bobby Kielty flied out to center field, and held Oakland scoreless. Wilson was pulled after catching Moyer's warmup pitches in the top of the second inning. Moyer pitched seven more innings, and the Mariners won, 4–1.

== Career statistics ==
In a 14-year major league career, Wilson played in 1,299 games, with a .262 batting average, 88 home runs and 519 runs batted in. He had a .995 fielding percentage, which at the time was the highest for a catcher in American League (AL) history and the sixth highest in major league history. Wilson led AL catchers twice each in fielding percentage, putouts, baserunners caught stealing, and range factor.

Wilson set an AL record for catchers with 1,051 putouts in 1997, the third highest season total for a catcher in major league history at the time. His 1,128 total chances in 1997 were an AL record and second-most in major league history at the time. In 2001, Wilson committed only one error in 122 games, for a .9987 fielding percentage. He holds many Mariners record for catchers, including games played, hits, and RBI.

== Post-playing career ==
On January 17, 2012, Wilson was named to the Mariners Hall of Fame and formally inducted that July.

Beginning in 2012, Wilson was a color commentator for Mariners games on Root Sports. Notably, along with Dave Sims, Wilson called the game on August 15, 2012 when Félix Hernández pitched the first perfect game in Mariners' history. He was also broadcasting on Root Sports on June 8, 2012 when six Mariners' pitchers combined for a no-hitter.

On November 3, 2013, the Mariners announced that Wilson would become the team's minor league catching coordinator.

On August 22, 2024, Wilson was hired as the Mariners manager after the team fired Scott Servais the same day. On September 26, the Mariners were eliminated from postseason contention.

In 2025, Wilson led the Mariners to the American League West division title. This was the first first-place finish for Seattle since 2001, when Wilson was the Mariners' primary catcher. The Mariners defeated the Detroit Tigers 3–2 in the ALDS, but lost in seven games to the Toronto Blue Jays in the American League Championship Series. On the final day of the 2026 regular season, the Mariners announced that Wilson would not return as manager.

== Managerial record ==
As of September 27, 2026

Team	Year	Regular season					Postseason			
Team	Year	Games	Won	Lost	Win %	Finish	Won	Lost	Win %	Result
SEA	2024	34	21	13	.618	2nd in AL West	–	–	–	
SEA	2025	162	90	72	.556	1st in AL West	6	6	.500	Lost ALCS (TOR)
SEA	2026	162	76	86	.469	3rd in AL West	–	–	–	
Total		358	187	171	.522		6	6	.500	

== Personal life ==
Wilson is married and has four children. His son Elijah is also a professional catcher, playing in Triple-A in several seasons in the Pittsburgh Pirates minor league system after also playing for the Golden Gophers.

Growing up, Wilson's favorite player was Johnny Bench, who predated Wilson as a catcher for the Reds. In high school, Wilson was an all-state hockey goaltender and the quarterback of the football team.
