= Alex Diaz (outfielder) =

American baseball player (born 1968)

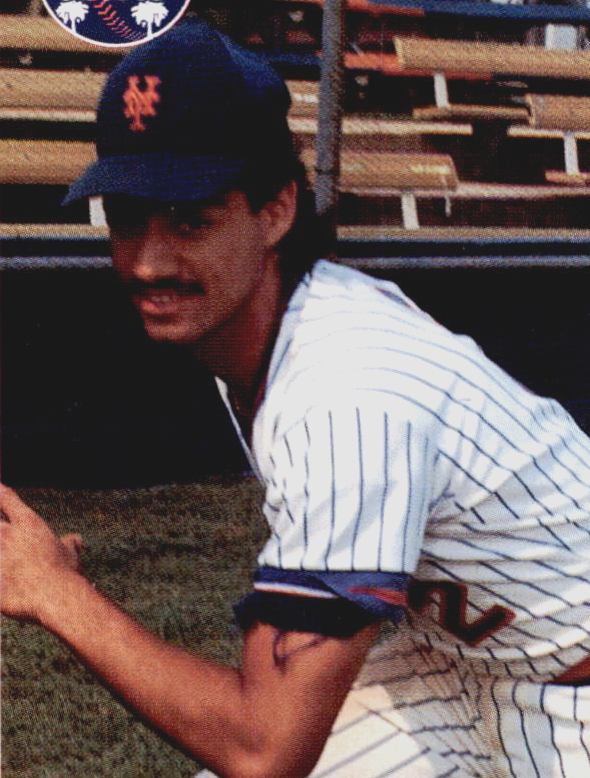
- Diaz with the Columbia Mets c. 1988
- Outfielder
- Born: October 5, 1968 (age 58); Brooklyn, New York, U.S.
- Batted: Switch Threw: Right

MLB debut
- July 25, 1992, for the Milwaukee Brewers

Last MLB appearance
- June 20, 1999, for the Houston Astros

MLB statistics
- Batting average: .239
- Home runs: 8
- Runs batted in: 75
- Stats at Baseball Reference

Teams
- Milwaukee Brewers (1992–1994); Seattle Mariners (1995–1996); Texas Rangers (1997); San Francisco Giants (1998); Houston Astros (1999)

Alexis Diaz (born October 5, 1968) is an American former Major League Baseball (MLB) outfielder. He played in parts of eight MLB seasons, from 1992 until 1999, for the Milwaukee Brewers, Seattle Mariners, Texas Rangers, San Francisco Giants and Houston Astros. His most substantial major league action was in 1995 with the Mariners, when he started in center field due to an injury to Ken Griffey Jr.

Born in Brooklyn, New York, Diaz attended Manuel Mendez Liciaga High School in San Sebastián, Puerto Rico. He signed with the New York Mets as an amateur free agent in August 1986. The Mets traded him and Darren Reed to the Montreal Expos for minor leaguers Terrel Hansen and Dave Sommer in April 1991. That October, Montreal traded Diaz to Milwaukee for George Canale. In Triple-A in 1992, Diaz had 62 stolen bases and was named the most exciting player in the American Association. He was viewed as a potential successor to Robin Yount, the Brewers' future Hall of Famer who was Diaz's childhood hero.

Diaz made his MLB debut with the Brewers in July 1992. He missed almost four months of the 1993 season with a fractured ankle. After two partial seasons in the majors, he played in 89 games in his rookie season in 1994, batting .251 and hitting his first MLB home run. His seven triples ranked fourth in the American League (AL). He went on the disabled list with a strained elbow in early August, days before the players' strike ended the season.

The Mariners claimed Diaz off waivers during the strike. He hit a home run on the first pitch he saw with Seattle on April 29, 1995. On May 26, Diaz was in right field when Griffey broke his wrist making a catch at the outfield wall, sidelining the future Hall of Famer for three months. Immediately after the catch, Diaz signalled for medical assistance for Griffey. Diaz, in a platoon with Rich Amaral, filled in for Griffey, playing in a career-high 103 games in the majors, though he was sent down to the minors for two weeks in August. On September 22, he hit a pinch-hit game-winning three-run home run off Rick Honeycutt of the Oakland Athletics, putting the Mariners in first place in the AL West, the latest point in the season the franchise had ever held a division lead. Diaz made his only postseason appearance that fall, batting 4-for-10. He returned to a bench role in 1996, playing in 38 games. He became a free agent after the season.

Diaz re-signed with the Mets but was released in April 1997, quickly signing with the Rangers. He had a .222 batting average in 28 games for Texas, returning to free agency after the season. He then played partial seasons with the Giants in 1998 and Astros in 1999, released by both teams in the second half of the season.

Diaz played for Algodoneros de Unión Laguna in the Mexican Baseball League in 2000 and 2001, the independent St. George Pioneerzz in 2001, and Guerreros de Oaxaca in Mexico in 2003.

== Personal life ==
Diaz is married and has a child.

After his MLB career, Diaz became a minister in San Sebastián.
