= Jim Converse =

American baseball player (born 1971)

- Pitcher
- Born: August 17, 1971 (age 54); San Francisco, California, U.S.
- Batted: Left Threw: Right

MLB debut
- May 22, 1993, for the Seattle Mariners

Last MLB appearance
- May 15, 1997, for the Kansas City Royals

MLB statistics
- Win–loss record: 2–11
- Earned run average: 7.21
- Strikeouts: 66
- Stats at Baseball Reference

Teams
- Seattle Mariners (1993–1995); Kansas City Royals (1995, 1997)

James Daniel Converse (born August 17, 1971) is an American former professional baseball pitcher. He played in Major League Baseball (MLB) from 1993-1997 for the Seattle Mariners and Kansas City Royals.

The Mariners selected Converse in the 16th round of the 1990 MLB draft. That summer with the Bellingham Mariners, he led the Northwest League with nine balks. He was named the most valuable player of the Peninsula Pilots in 1991, then the Southern League's most outstanding pitcher in 1992. He was in line to be the fifth pitcher in the Mariners starting rotation in 1993, but suffered an elbow injury in April, making his MLB debut in May, taking the loss against the Royals. He made one more start before being sent back down to the minors when Chris Bosio left the disabled list. Converse made four starts in his first MLB season, going 1–3. He and other young starters did not impress manager Lou Piniella.

Converse made a career-high eight MLB starts in 1994, going 0–5. He was traded to the Royals for Vince Coleman on August 15, 1995. Converse pitched in 12 MLB games for the Royals. He missed the 1996 season with a shoulder injury. He allowed Jorge Posada's first MLB home run on May 4, 1997.

Converse pitched in 2000 for the Solano Steelheads in the independent Western Baseball League. During a game that summer, former MLB All-Star Kevin Mitchell charged the mound at Converse, which led to Mitchell's expulsion from the league.

Converse is married and has two children.
