= Bob Wolcott =

American baseball player (born 1973)

- Pitcher
- Born: September 8, 1973 (age 53); Huntington Beach, California, U.S.
- Batted: Right Threw: Right

Professional debut
- MLB: August 18, 1995, for the Seattle Mariners
- NPB: April 1, 2000, for the Kintetsu Buffaloes

Last appearance
- MLB: July 1, 1999, for the Boston Red Sox
- NPB: August 9, 2000, for the Kintetsu Buffaloes

MLB statistics
- Win–loss record: 16–21
- Earned run average: 5.86
- Strikeouts: 178

NPB statistics
- Win–loss record: 3–4
- Earned run average: 6.09
- Strikeouts: 26
- Stats at Baseball Reference

Teams
- Seattle Mariners (1995–1997); Arizona Diamondbacks (1998); Boston Red Sox (1999); Kintetsu Buffaloes (2000)

Robert William Wolcott (born September 8, 1973) is an American former professional baseball pitcher. He played all or part of five seasons in Major League Baseball (MLB) for the Seattle Mariners (1995–97), Arizona Diamondbacks (1998), and Boston Red Sox (1999). He also played for the Kintetsu Buffaloes in Nippon Professional Baseball (NPB)

== Playing career ==
Wolcott was a key member of the 1995 "Refuse to Lose" Seattle Mariner team, the first Mariner team to reach the playoffs. He was a late season call-up from the minor leagues in August, he earned the win in his first MLB start against the Boston Red Sox, the team with which he would pitch his final MLB season in 1999.

Wolcott started Game 1 of the 1995 American League Championship Series against the Cleveland Indians. He walked the bases loaded in the first inning but settled down, scattering 8 hits and 2 runs over 7 innings in a Mariners 3–2 win.

Wolcott never matched the success of his first season. After two more seasons with the Mariners, the Arizona Diamondbacks claimed him in the expansion draft. Arizona traded him to the Red Sox in 1999. After a season in NPB in 2000, he came back to pitch three games in the Oakland Athletics organization in 2001. He was released after being put on the disabled list with a shoulder injury.

== Post-playing career ==
After his baseball career ended, Wolcott majored in mechanical engineering at Oregon State University. However, he did not finish his degree, opting to open a machine shop after an internship with Intel.
