= 1995 American League Championship Series =

26th edition of Major League Baseball's American League Championship Series

Team (Wins)	Managers	Season
Cleveland Indians (4)	Mike Hargrove	100–44 (.694), GA: 30
Seattle Mariners (2)	Lou Piniella	79–66 (.545), GA: 1
- Dates: October 10–17
- MVP: Orel Hershiser (Cleveland)
- Umpires: Dave Phillips (Games 1–4), Ken Kaiser (Game 6), Derryl Cousins, Rick Reed, Dale Ford, Tim McClelland, Drew Coble

Broadcast
- Television: ABC (Games 1–2); NBC (Games 3–6)
- TV announcers: Brent Musburger and Jim Kaat (Games 1–2); Bob Costas and Bob Uecker (Games 3–6)
- Radio: CBS
- Radio announcers: John Rooney and Gary Cohen
- ALDS: Seattle Mariners over New York Yankees (3–2); Cleveland Indians over Boston Red Sox (3–0)

The 1995 American League Championship Series (ALCS) was a best-of-seven playoff series in Major League Baseball's 1995 postseason, which pitted the AL West champion Seattle Mariners against the AL Central champion Cleveland Indians for the American League pennant. The Series began on October 10 and ended on October 17. The Mariners held home-field advantage due to the predetermined rotation in place from 1995–1997 amongst division champions.

The Indians won the Series in six games, the franchise's first American League pennant since 1954. They subsequently lost to the National League champion Atlanta Braves in the 1995 World Series.

== Background ==
=== Mariners ===
The summer of 1995 proved to be the most pivotal stretch in Seattle Mariners history. The Mariners were an expansion team created as a result of a breach of contract lawsuit involving the Seattle Pilots' 1969 departure after just one year in Seattle. Since their inception, the Mariners had been a doormat franchise, finishing with a losing record every year until 1991, their 15th season as a franchise. By 1995, they had recorded just two winning record seasons with no postseason appearances.

There was also an issue with the stadium, the Kingdome, a multipurpose domed stadium that had become outdated by the mid-1990s. This became even more apparent in late July 1994, when tiles fell from the ceiling 30 minutes before the stadium was set to open for a game against the Baltimore Orioles, forcing the Mariners to play the rest of what would be a shortened season on the road. It was clear by the start of the 1995 season, the Mariners needed a new stadium in Seattle or they would be moved to a city that could provide them one.

With this as the backdrop heading into the strike-shortened 1995 season, the Mariners won their first division title, in part due to a historic collapse from the California Angels. The Angels were leading the American League West by 10 1/2-game lead over the Texas Rangers and an 11 1/2-game lead over Seattle on August 16 and were still atop the division, leading Seattle by six games and Texas by 7 1/2, when a nine-game losing streak from September 13 to 23 dropped them out of first place. The Mariners beat the Angels in a one-game playoff and then beat the Yankees in five game series in the ALDS on a walk-off double by Edgar Martínez to get to their first ALCS in franchise history.

The team was affectionately nicknamed the "Refuse to Lose" Mariners.

=== Cleveland Indians ===
The story of lack of team success and stadium funding could have also been said of the Cleveland Indians, prior to 1994. Since the 1954 World Series, the Indians had not made the postseason, which included a stretch from 1977 to 1989 where they placed fourth or worse every year. Like the Mariners, the Indians also played in a multi-purpose stadium that had its issues. Cleveland Stadium, who also hosted the Cleveland Browns, had been the Indians’ home since 1932. By the early 1990s, the stadium's inadequacy was becoming apparent as chunks of concrete were falling off and the pilings were starting to petrify. In May 1990, Cuyahoga County voters approved funding for a new Gateway Sports and Entertainment Complex, which included the new ballpark, an adjacent arena for the Cleveland Cavaliers of the National Basketball Association (NBA), and two parking garages.

When the Indians moved into Jacobs Field in 1994, success immediately followed. By the time of the season ended in 1994 due to the players' strike, the Indians were 66-47 and in a postseason spot as a Wild Card. The Indians carried over the success into the 1995 season, where they won the American League Central by a whopping 30 games and won 100 games for the first time since the ill-fated 1954 season.

== Summary ==
=== Seattle Mariners vs. Cleveland Indians ===
Cleveland won the series, 4–2.

Game	Date	Score	Location	Time	Attendance
1	October 10	Cleveland Indians – 2, Seattle Mariners – 3	Kingdome	3:07	57,065
2	October 11	Cleveland Indians – 5, Seattle Mariners – 2	Kingdome	3:14	58,144
3	October 13	Seattle Mariners – 5, Cleveland Indians – 2 (11)	Jacobs Field	3:18	43,643
4	October 14	Seattle Mariners – 0, Cleveland Indians – 7	Jacobs Field	3:30	43,686
5	October 15	Seattle Mariners – 2, Cleveland Indians – 3	Jacobs Field	3:37	43,607
6	October 17	Cleveland Indians – 4, Seattle Mariners – 0	Kingdome	2:54	58,489

== Game summaries ==
=== Game 1 ===
October 10, 1995 5:08 pm (PDT) at Kingdome in Seattle, Washington 68 °F (20 °C), dome
Team	1	2	3	4	5	6	7	8	9	R	H	E
Cleveland	0	0	1	0	0	0	1	0	0	2	10	1
Seattle	0	2	0	0	0	0	1	0	X	3	7	0
WP: Bob Wolcott (1–0) LP: Dennis Martínez (0–1) Sv: Norm Charlton (1); Home runs: CLE: Albert Belle (1); SEA: Mike Blowers (1); Attendance: 57,065; Boxscore

The Indians' starting pitcher was Dennis Martínez for Game 1. Meanwhile, the Mariners started rookie Bob Wolcott, who walked the first three hitters on 13 pitches. Then, he would get the next three outs without giving up a run. He first struck out Albert Belle, got Eddie Murray on a foul pop-fly, then induced a groundout from Jim Thome, thanks to a diving stop by Joey Cora. In the second inning, Mike Blowers hit a two-run homer to give the Mariners a 2–0 lead. However, the Indians would score a run in the next inning and later in the seventh, when Belle's homer tied the game. With Martinez still pitching in a tie game, the Mariners would take the lead thanks to Luis Sojo's go-ahead double in the bottom half of the seventh. Norm Charlton would come on in the eighth inning for a 1 1/3 inning save. He would retire the side in order in the ninth, and the Mariners took Game 1.

=== Game 2 ===
October 11, 1995 5:08 pm (PDT) at Kingdome in Seattle, Washington 68 °F (20 °C), dome
Team	1	2	3	4	5	6	7	8	9	R	H	E
Cleveland	0	0	0	0	2	2	0	1	0	5	12	0
Seattle	0	0	0	0	0	1	0	0	1	2	6	1
WP: Orel Hershiser (1–0) LP: Tim Belcher (0–1); Home runs: CLE: Manny Ramírez 2 (2); SEA: Ken Griffey Jr. (1), Jay Buhner (1); Attendance: 58,144; Boxscore

The Indians' second veteran Orel Hershiser was called upon to stem the tide against Tim Belcher. Both pitchers dueled for four innings until the Indians broke through in the top of the fifth with a two-run single by Carlos Baerga. In the next inning, the Indians grabbed two more on a Manny Ramírez homer and an RBI triple by Sandy Alomar Jr. Ken Griffey Jr.'s sixth postseason homer put the Mariners on the board to make it 4–1 in the bottom of the sixth. The Indians would put the game away when Manny Ramírez hit his second homer of the game in the eighth inning to make it 5–1. Hershiser gave way to José Mesa in the ninth. Mesa would issue a one-out homer to Jay Buhner but would recover to close out the win, evening the series at 1–1. With the victory, Hershiser raised his postseason record to 6–0 with a 1.47 ERA in 73 1/3 innings.

=== Game 3 ===
October 13, 1995 8:08 pm (EDT) at Jacobs Field in Cleveland, Ohio 73 °F (23 °C), clear
Team	1	2	3	4	5	6	7	8	9	10	11	R	H	E
Seattle	0	1	1	0	0	0	0	0	0	0	3	5	9	1
Cleveland	0	0	0	1	0	0	0	1	0	0	0	2	4	2
WP: Norm Charlton (1–0) LP: Julián Tavárez (0–1); Home runs: SEA: Jay Buhner 2 (3); CLE: None; Attendance: 43,643; Boxscore

In Game 3, the starting pitchers were Randy Johnson and Charles Nagy. Nagy and Johnson pitched a scoreless first inning, but the Mariners broke through on a homer by Jay Buhner. An error in the third by Álvaro Espinoza gave the Mariners another run to make it 2–0 Seattle. The Indians put a run on the board after a leadoff triple by Kenny Lofton and a sacrifice fly by Omar Vizquel in the fourth. In the bottom of the eighth, Buhner missed a deep fly ball to right; Lofton then singled through the left side to tie the game at two. The game moved to extra innings, and in the 11th inning, Buhner, whose miscue tied the game, got redemption with a three-run home run to give the Mariners a 5–2 lead. Charlton, pitching in relief since the ninth inning, got the win and shut down the Indians in the bottom of the 11th to give Seattle a 2–1 series lead.

=== Game 4 ===
October 14, 1995 7:08 pm (EDT) at Jacobs Field in Cleveland, Ohio 53 °F (12 °C), drizzle
Team	1	2	3	4	5	6	7	8	9	R	H	E
Seattle	0	0	0	0	0	0	0	0	0	0	6	1
Cleveland	3	1	2	0	0	1	0	0	X	7	9	0
WP: Ken Hill (1–0) LP: Andy Benes (0–1); Home runs: SEA: None; CLE: Eddie Murray (1), Jim Thome (1); Attendance: 43,686; Boxscore

Cleveland called on Ken Hill to pitch to tie the series. Opposing him was Andy Benes, who didn't fare well against Hill and the Cleveland batters. The Indians scored three runs in the first inning, a rally capped by Murray's two-run homer. A sacrifice fly by Kenny Lofton made it 4–0 in the second. Rain began falling in the third inning, and Benes surrendered a two-run homer to Jim Thome. Benes was pulled, and the rain ended after the inning. Hill pitched seven scoreless innings, leading his team to a 7–0 shutout, leveling the series at 2–2.

=== Game 5 ===
October 15, 1995 7:24 pm (EDT) at Jacobs Field in Cleveland, Ohio 55 °F (13 °C), windy
Team	1	2	3	4	5	6	7	8	9	R	H	E
Seattle	0	0	1	0	1	0	0	0	0	2	5	2
Cleveland	1	0	0	0	0	2	0	0	X	3	10	4
WP: Orel Hershiser (2–0) LP: Chris Bosio (0–1) Sv: José Mesa (1); Home runs: SEA: None; CLE: Jim Thome (2); Attendance: 43,607; Boxscore

Game 5 was a matchup between Chris Bosio and Orel Hershiser. Hershiser was looking to continue his excellence, and he got help quickly when the Indians knocked home a run in the first inning thanks to an error by Tino Martinez. But Hershiser's slim lead was erased in the third when Ken Griffey Jr.'s RBI double tied the game. In the fifth, an error by Belle gave the Mariners a 2–1 lead. The Mariners were closing in on a 3–2 series lead going home, but the Indians prevented it, as Thome hit a two-run homer in the sixth inning to give the lead back to the Indians. The Mariners had their share of chances; in the seventh, they had men on the corners with one out and Griffey at the plate. Paul Assenmacher was called from the bullpen. He proceeded to strike out Griffey on a high fastball, then Buhner on a low breaking ball, causing the 40,000 fans in attendance to go wild. The Mariners could not capitalize on any more opportunities, and José Mesa closed the door in the ninth, putting the Indians one game away from the World Series.

=== Game 6 ===
October 17, 1995 5:08 pm (PDT) at Kingdome in Seattle, Washington 68 °F (20 °C), dome
Team	1	2	3	4	5	6	7	8	9	R	H	E
Cleveland	0	0	0	0	1	0	0	3	0	4	8	0
Seattle	0	0	0	0	0	0	0	0	0	0	4	1
WP: Dennis Martínez (1–1) LP: Randy Johnson (0–1); Home runs: CLE: Carlos Baerga (1); SEA: None; Attendance: 58,489; Boxscore

In an opportunity to win the series for the Indians, Dennis Martínez faced Randy Johnson. Both pitchers kept the game scoreless until the top of the fifth inning. An error by Joey Cora allowed Kenny Lofton to single home a run to put the Indians up 1–0. With the score still 1–0 in the eighth, the Indians scored three more runs against Johnson. A passed ball with two men in scoring position allowed both of them to score. Lofton made a mad dash from second base, sliding in just ahead of the tag from Johnson, and the entire Cleveland dugout ran onto the field to celebrate. Then Carlos Baerga followed with a homer to give the Indians a 4–0 lead with six outs to go. Once again, José Mesa came on to close the door in the ninth and did so with ease.

The Indians won their first pennant since 1954. The Mariners were one of the very few teams to have lost in two shutouts in one series. Hershiser was selected as the Most Valuable Player of the series. He was the first player to win the LCS MVP Award in both leagues, having previously done so in 1988 for the Los Angeles Dodgers.

== Composite box ==
1995 ALCS (4–2): Cleveland Indians over Seattle Mariners

Team	1	2	3	4	5	6	7	8	9	10	11	R	H	E
Cleveland Indians	4	1	3	1	3	5	1	5	0	0	0	23	53	7
Seattle Mariners	0	3	2	0	1	1	1	0	1	0	3	12	37	6
Total attendance: 304,634 Average attendance: 50,772

== Aftermath ==
=== Cleveland Indians ===
In their first World Series appearance since 1954, the Indians lost to the Atlanta Braves in six games. They returned to the World Series in 1997, but they would lose again to the Florida Marlins in seven games. The Indians remained a World Series contender until the early 2000s, which by that time many of their stars, such as Manny Ramirez, Sandy Alomar, and Jim Thome, had moved on to other teams.

In December 2020, MLB Network Presents: The Dynasty That Almost Was debuted on MLB Network, documenting the Indians' run in the mid-to-late 1990s.

=== Seattle Mariners ===
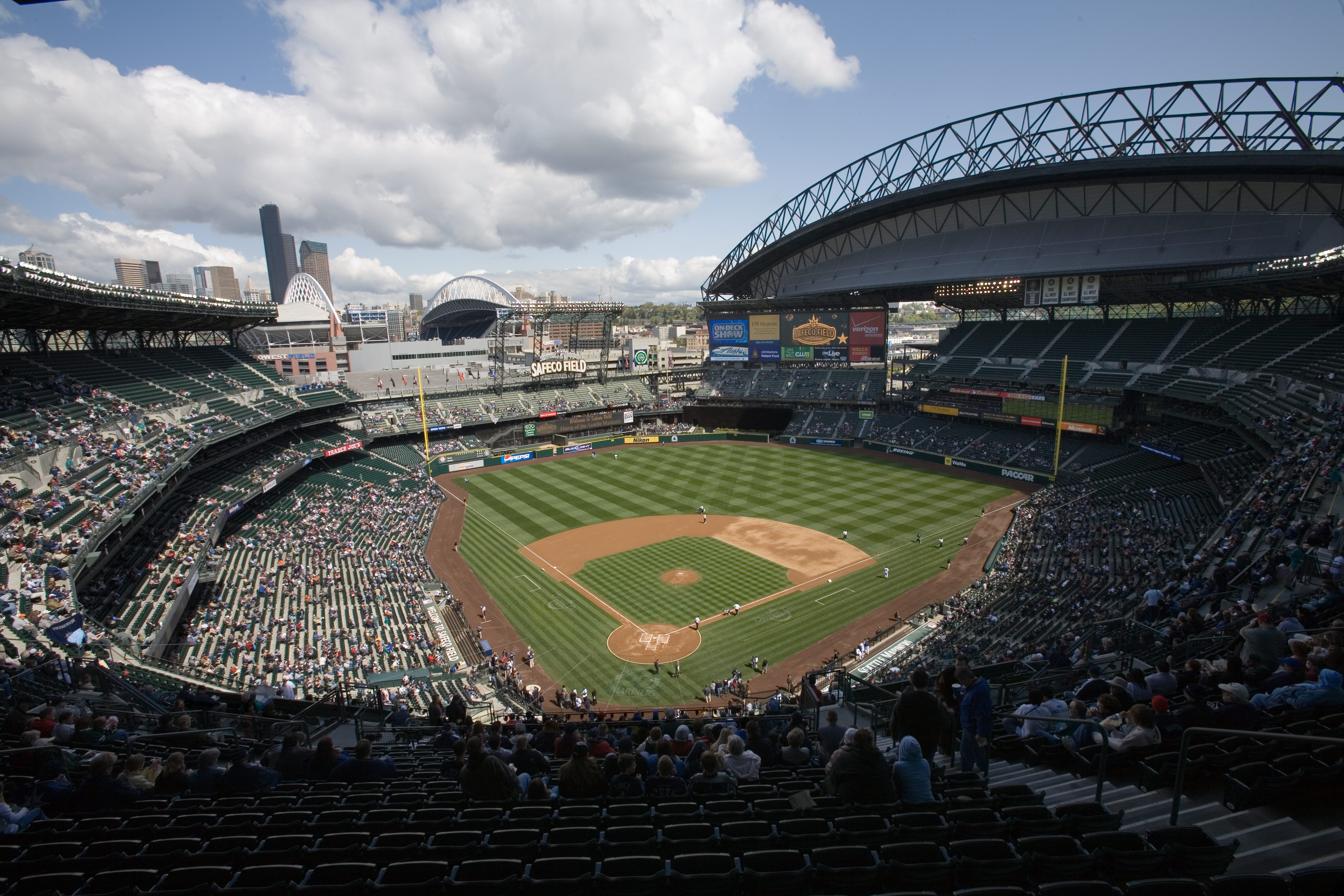
Safeco Field (pictured in 2007), now named T-Mobile Park, home of the Mariners since 1999.

By the time of their American League Division Series meeting with the Yankees, Washington governor Mike Lowry called an emergency session of the legislature in early October with one goal: to approve a new funding package for a stadium. A few weeks after the end of the Mariners postseason run, the King County Council voted, 10–3, to enact the stadium funding package that the Washington state legislature approved. Although groundbreaking on what would become Safeco Field was still 18 months off, baseball was finally safe in Seattle.

The Mariners would avenge their 1995 ALCS loss to the Indians when they beat them in the 2001 ALDS in five games. The Mariners broke the all-time wins record for a team in 2001; however, they failed to make the World Series that season, losing to the Yankees 4–1 in the ALCS. The franchise had not been back to the playoffs since 2001 until they qualified for the 2022 playoffs.

In July 2019, MLB Network released MLB Network Presents: The 1995 Mariners, Saving Baseball in Seattle.

Until losing to the Blue Jays in seven games in the 2025 ALCS, 1995 was the closest the Mariners came to a World Series, as they have not made a World Series in their franchise history.
