= Greg Pirkl =

American baseball player (born 1970)

- First baseman
- Born: August 7, 1970 (age 55); Long Beach, California, U.S.
- Batted: Right Threw: Right

Professional debut
- MLB: August 13, 1993, for the Seattle Mariners
- NPB: April 5, 1997, for the Fukuoka Daiei Hawks

Last appearance
- MLB: August 16, 1996, for the Boston Red Sox
- NPB: May 1, 1997, for the Fukuoka Daiei Hawks

MLB statistics
- Batting average: .224
- Home runs: 8
- Runs batted in: 16
- Stats at Baseball Reference

Teams
- Seattle Mariners (1993–1996); Boston Red Sox (1996); Fukuoka Daiei Hawks (1997)

Gregory Daniel Pirkl (born August 7, 1970) is an American baseball player. He played parts of four seasons in Major League Baseball, from 1993 to 1996, for the Seattle Mariners and Boston Red Sox. He also played part of 1997 for the Fukuoka Daiei Hawks in the Nippon Professional Baseball (NPB). After being drafted as a catcher, he played first base and designated hitter in the majors before converting to a pitcher in the minor leagues later in his career.

== Playing career ==
Pirkl attended Los Alamitos High School in Los Alamitos, California. He did not play Little League Baseball and later pitched some in high school. In 1988, he was named the Orange County baseball player of the year by the Los Angeles Times and Orange County Register after batting .540 with 10 home runs. He played catcher, switching from playing first base and third base earlier in his high school career. He committed to play college baseball for the USC Trojans.

The Seattle Mariners drafted Pirkl in the second round of the 1988 MLB draft, assigning him to the Class A Short Season Bellingham Mariners. After returning to Bellingham in 1989, he suffered left knee injuries in 1990. He reached Double-A in 1992 and hit poorly, .195, that fall in the Arizona Fall League. He stopped catching after 1992. He was the MVP of the Triple-A Calgary Cannons in 1993.

The Mariners promoted Pirkl to the majors in August 1993. He had two hits in his MLB debut, off Chuck Finley of the California Angels, and hit a home run the next day off Mark Langston. However, he went hitless in his final four games in August and was sent back to the minors, ending his first MLB season with a .175 batting average.

Pirkl hit five home runs in April 1994 but was sent down to Triple-A on May 15. In 19 games with the Mariners, he hit .264 with a career-high 6 home runs. In the minors, he led Triple-A first basemen with 13 errors. He was tabbed as a potential backup first baseman again in 1995. He played in 10 games for the Mariners that year, batting .235 with no extra base hits.

The Boston Red Sox claimed Pirkl off waivers on August 1, 1996. The team attempted to convert him back to a pitcher in the minor leagues, but he wanted to continue as a hitter. In his final MLB season, Pirkl batted 2-for-23 with one home run with Seattle and Boston.

Pirkl played for the Fukuoka Daiei Hawks of Nippon Professional Baseball in 1997, hitting .213 with 2 home runs in 16 games. He also attempted to pitch in Japan, never appearing in a game but hurting his pitching arm. He had surgery that August. He remained in the U.S. in 1998, playing in the Cleveland Indians minor league system as a pitcher for two seasons to end his playing career.

== Personal life ==
Pirkl and his wife have two children. He also has a child from a previous relationship.

Pirkl had a scholarship agreement with the Mariners to pay for his college at the University of Southern California, but he did not enroll within two years of being drafted, letting his scholarship offer lapse.
