= Luis Sojo =

Venezuelan baseball player (born 1965)

- Sojo with Magallanes in 2011
- Infielder
- Born: January 3, 1965 (age 61); Petare, Miranda, Venezuela
- Batted: Right Threw: Right

MLB debut
- July 14, 1990, for the Toronto Blue Jays

Last MLB appearance
- September 28, 2003, for the New York Yankees

MLB statistics
- Batting average: .261
- Home runs: 36
- Runs batted in: 261
- Stats at Baseball Reference

Teams
- Toronto Blue Jays (1990); California Angels (1991–1992); Toronto Blue Jays (1993); Seattle Mariners (1994–1996); New York Yankees (1996–1999); Pittsburgh Pirates (2000); New York Yankees (2000–2001, 2003)

Career highlights and awards
- 4× World Series champion (1996, 1998–2000)

Member of the Venezuelan

Baseball Hall of Fame
- Induction: 2012

Luis Beltrán Sojo Sojo (/ˈsoʊhoʊ/ SOH-hoh; Spanish pronunciation: [ˈlwis βelˈtɾan ˈsoxo]; born January 3, 1965) is a Venezuelan former professional baseball infielder for the Toronto Blue Jays, California Angels, Seattle Mariners, Pittsburgh Pirates and New York Yankees of Major League Baseball. Sojo filled a role as a utility infielder and won four World Series championships with the Yankees.

Sojo served as manager of the Venezuelan national baseball team at the first three editions of the World Baseball Classic (2006, 2009, and 2013), as well as the inaugural WBSC Premier12 tournament in 2015. He is a member of the Venezuelan Baseball Hall of Fame and the Caribbean Baseball Hall of Fame.

== Professional career ==
=== Toronto Blue Jays (1990) ===
Sojo signed with the Blue Jays on January 3, 1986. Called up late in the 1990 season, Sojo played 33 games for the Toronto Blue Jays. He went 18-for-80 (.225).

=== California Angels (1991–1992) ===
After the 1990 season, the Blue Jays traded Sojo, Junior Félix, and a player to be named later (Ken Rivers) to the California Angels for Devon White, Willie Fraser, and Marcus Moore. Sojo played 219 games for the Angels over two years. In 1991, he had 19 sacrifice hits, a career-high.

=== Toronto Blue Jays (1993) ===
After the 1992 season, the Angels traded Sojo back to the Blue Jays for Kelly Gruber.

Sojo played only 19 games in 1993, and was only 8 for 47 (.170), although he managed to collect six runs batted in. He earned his first of five World Series rings. On October 15, he was granted free agency.

=== Seattle Mariners (1994–1996) ===
Sojo hit .277 over 63 games in the strike-shortened 1994 season, while also hitting 6 home runs, then a career-best. He was once again awarded a starting role in 1995, where he played in 102 games, his second-highest career total. He finished the season with 98 hits, and seven home runs, tying a career best. In the 1995 American League Division Series against the Yankees, he played in all five games, going 5-for-20 with 3 runs batted in. He continued his hot streak into the 1995 American League Championship Series, again going 5-for-20 as the Mariners lost to the Cleveland Indians.

Sojo began the 1996 season with the Mariners, hitting just .211 (52-for-247) over 77 games.

=== New York Yankees (1996–1999) ===
The New York Yankees claimed Sojo off of waivers on August 22, 1996. He began his Yankee career 11-for-40 (.275) while only striking out four times with one walk. After playing only 18 games with the Yankees, he was added to the postseason roster. He did not receive a plate appearance during the 1996 American League Division Series, but played as a defensive replacement and pinch runner. He did, however, play in the 1996 American League Championship Series, going 1 for 5 over 3 games. Despite his limited playing time in that postseason, he played in five of the six games of the 1996 World Series, going 3 for 5 (.600) with a double and a run batted in. Sojo earned his second World Series ring when the Yankees defeated the Atlanta Braves.

On January 9, 1997, Sojo re-signed with the Yankees. In 1997, Sojo began to see his playing time decrease. He played in only 77 games, hitting .307. Sojo's 25 runs batted in was his most as a Yankee. He did not play at all in the 1997 postseason as the Yankees were defeated by the Cleveland Indians. He was granted free agency on October 31, and again re-signed with the Yankees on November 12, 1997.

During the 1998 season, Sojo appeared in 54 games, hitting .231. He had 34 hits and 14 runs batted in during the season, but did not play in the 1998 American League Division Series. He rejoined the team for the Championship Series, where he played in one game. He did not play in the World Series, but received a ring regardless.

In 1999, Sojo played in just 49 games, less than the previous year, but hit .252 and again missed the Division Series. He re-joined the team for the 1999 American League Championship Series, where he had only one at-bat. He was not much of a force in the World Series that year either, with just one at-bat, but nevertheless received a World Series ring. He was released on November 10.

=== Pittsburgh Pirates (2000) ===
On January 9, 2000, Sojo signed with the Pittsburgh Pirates. He played in 61 games and hit .284 with five home runs before being traded to the Yankees on August 7 in exchange for Chris Spurling.

=== New York Yankees (2000–2001) ===
Sojo played in 34 games after being traded and hit .288, earning him a spot on the postseason roster. Playing in all five games of the American League Division Series, he was 3 for 16 with 5 RBIs and 3 hits. Playing in all six games of the 2000 American League Championship Series, he went 6 for 23. In Game 5 of the 2000 World Series, Sojo turned from a role player to a hero. With the score tied at two with two outs in the ninth inning, Sojo singled to center, driving in Jorge Posada to break the tie with Scott Brosius also scoring on the errant throw to home plate. The Yankees won their 26th World Series, their third consecutive, and fourth in the Joe Torre era. Sojo obtained his fifth World Series ring, (4 with New York and one with the Blue Jays).

On November 7, Sojo was released again and re-signed exactly one month later on December 7. In 2001, he played in 39 games, collecting only 13 hits, but proved productive, as he drove in nine runs. After missing the American League Division Series, he received one at-bat in the American League Championship Series. He played in two of the seven games in that year's World Series, going 1-for-3 with a run batted in.

== Retirement and first coaching stint (2002) ==
In 2002, Sojo failed to earn a spot on the Yankees roster, and retired from playing Major League Baseball. He then made his managerial debut with the Yankees Double A affiliate Norwich Navigators, and led the team to its first Eastern League Championship.

== Return to the Yankees (2003) ==
Having left the Navigators, Sojo was invited to the Yankees Old Timers Day in 2003. Later that season, the Yankees re-signed Sojo as an active player when Jeter had an injury. and he appeared in three games to conclude the season.

In 13 seasons, Sojo batted .261 (671-for-2571) with 36 home runs, 261 RBI, 300 runs, 103 doubles, 12 triples, and 28 stolen bases in 848 games.

== Post-playing career ==
After his playing career, he served as the New York Yankees third base coach for the 2004 and 2005 seasons. He was the manager for the Class A Advanced Tampa Yankees from 2006 to 2009, before being relieved on February 2, 2010. Sojo also managed the Venezuelan national baseball team in the 2006, 2009, and the 2013 World Baseball Classic. On January 10, 2011, the New York Yankees announced that they were bringing Sojo back to manage the Tampa Yankees.

After a disappointing 2013 season for the Tampa Yankees, the Yankees dismissed Sojo. He spent the 2014 season as the third base coach for the AAA Scranton/Wilkes-Barre RailRiders before being fired and starting in 2015 he served as the assistant field coordinator for the Yankees. In 2017 he was named manager of the Gulf Coast League Yankees East.

In 2019, Sojo was named new manager of the Spanish national baseball team.

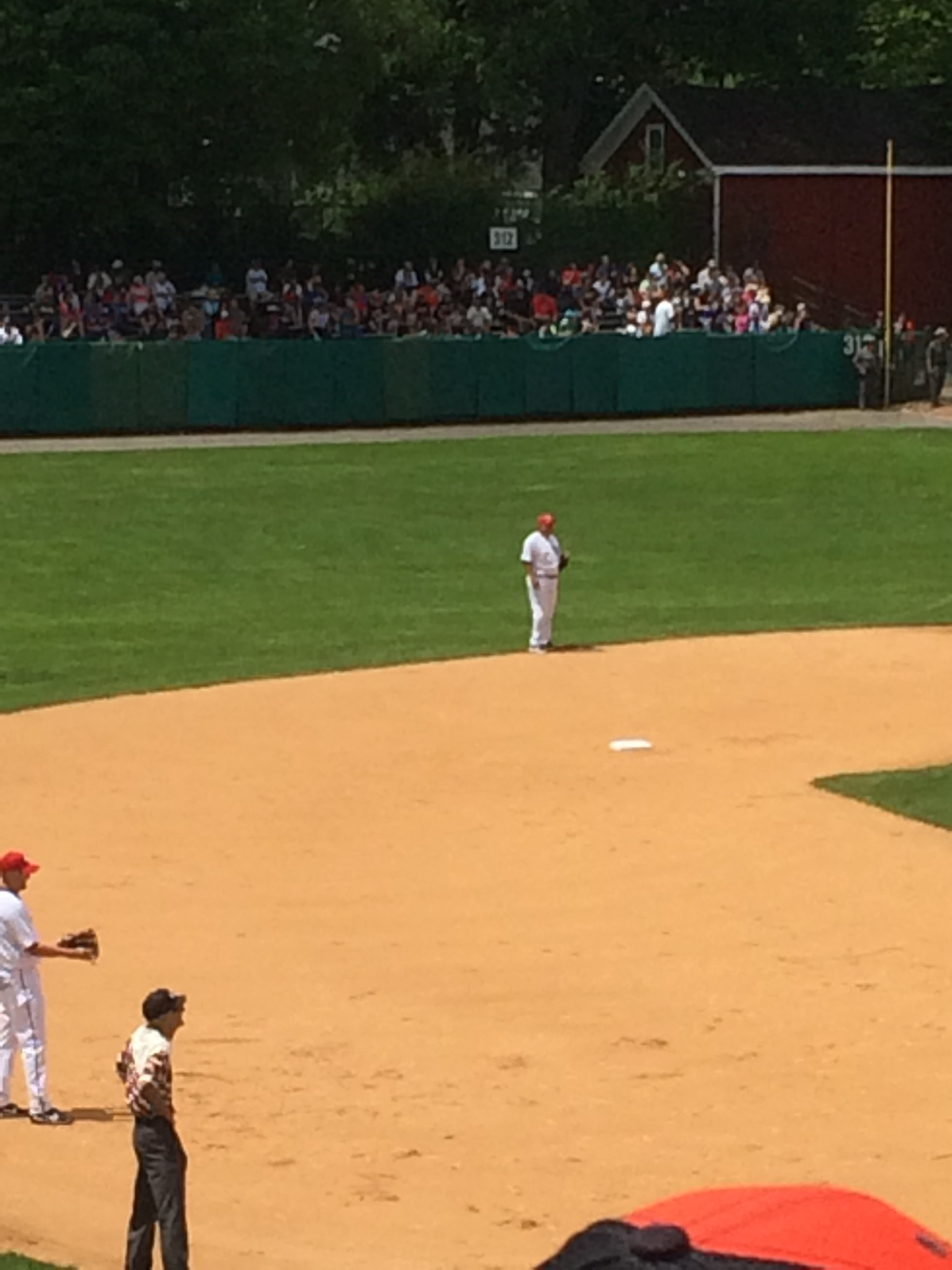
Sojo at the Baseball Hall of Fame classic 2017

== Skills ==
Not classically athletic, he was a natural shortstop in the minors, but took on an expanded role in emergency situations, initially and most commonly as a second baseman, and eventually as a third baseman, first baseman and left fielder as well.

Sojo had limited power and did not draw many walks, however he could hit for contact well, especially for someone who as a minor leaguer made a habit of falling behind in the count. He did show an ability to put the ball in play with a low strikeout rate (one for 13 at-bats). Some of his larger contributions came when going to the opposite field in hit and run situations and with infield hits. An avid bunter, he led the league in sacrificial hits in 1991 (19). Though he was not a threat as a base stealer and was a competent base runner. In the field, Sojo had a good range and a good arm, showing quick hands and slick moves.

== Highlights ==
- Hit a two-outs bases-clearing broken-bat double against California Angels Mark Langston to lead Seattle to its very first AL West division title, with four runs scoring on the play: Sojo took third on the throw to the plate, and scored after the frustrated Langston's relay ended up in the backstop (1995)
- Hit .400 with one RBI in 10 post-season games [.800 in the WS] (1996)
- Batted a career-high .307 in his first full season as a Yankee (1997)
- Tied for second on the team with nine RBI in 15 post-season games (2000)
- Drove in the World Series winning run (2000)
- Became the first man ever to manage a minor league team to a championship and later resume his Major League career.
- Five batting titles in the Venezuelan Winter League (.351, 1989–90; .362, 1990–91; .375, 1993–94; .376, 1994–95; .346, 1999–2000)
- Was called 'The best .200 hitter ever" by Yankees radio announcer John Sterling
- Reached 1000 hits on Dec. 14/15 (around midnight) in the Venezuelan Professional Baseball League (LVBP) with his team, Cardenales de Lara.

== See also ==
- List of Major League Baseball players from Venezuela

Sporting positions
Preceded by Larry Bowa	New York Yankees third base coach 2004–2005	Succeeded by Willie Randolph
