= Darren Bragg =

American baseball outfielder (born 1969)

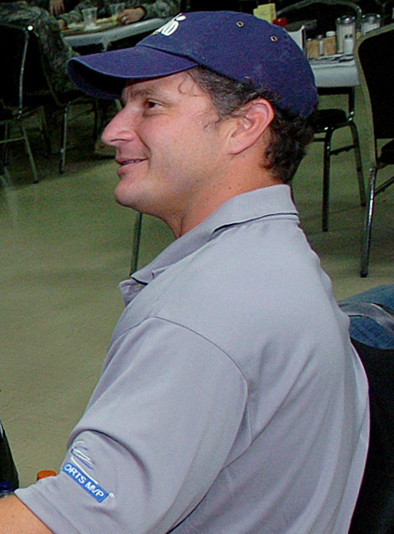
- Bragg in 2007
- Outfielder
- Born: September 7, 1969 (age 56); Waterbury, Connecticut, U.S.
- Batted: Left Threw: Right

MLB debut
- April 12, 1994, for the Seattle Mariners

Last MLB appearance
- October 3, 2004, for the Cincinnati Reds

MLB statistics
- Batting average: .255
- Home runs: 46
- Runs batted in: 260
- Stats at Baseball Reference

Teams
- Seattle Mariners (1994–1996); Boston Red Sox (1996–1998); St. Louis Cardinals (1999); Colorado Rockies (2000); New York Mets (2001); New York Yankees (2001); Atlanta Braves (2002–2003); San Diego Padres (2004); Cincinnati Reds (2004)
Medals
Men's baseball
Representing United States
Goodwill Games
Bronze medal – third place	1990 Seattle	Team

Darren William Bragg (born September 7, 1969) is an American former professional baseball outfielder and coach who played 11 seasons in Major League Baseball (MLB). He played for the Seattle Mariners, Boston Red Sox, St. Louis Cardinals, Colorado Rockies, New York Mets, New York Yankees, Atlanta Braves, San Diego Padres, and Cincinnati Reds.

== Career ==
Bragg attended Georgia Tech, and in 1989 he played collegiate summer baseball with the Cotuit Kettleers of the Cape Cod Baseball League. The Seattle Mariners selected Bragg in the 22nd round of the 1991 MLB draft.

In his major league career, he hit .255 with 46 home runs, 260 RBI, and 56 stolen bases.

After debuting with the Mariners in 1994, Bragg was traded by Seattle to the Boston Red Sox for Jamie Moyer on July 30, 1996. Bragg replaced Lee Tinsley as Boston's starting center fielder. He started almost every day for the Red Sox throughout 1997, despite the previous winter's signing of Shane Mack. The following year, Bragg fell into a platoon arrangement with Darren Lewis and Damon Buford in the outfield. Bragg became a free agent after the 1998 season and signed with the St. Louis Cardinals in January 1999. He returned to free agency after the season, then signed with the Colorado Rockies, who released him in July 2000. He signed with the New York Mets in January 2001, and the New York Yankees claimed him in June. He played for the Atlanta Braves in 2002 and 2003, then split the 2004 season with the San Diego Padres and Cincinnati Reds.

== Post-playing career ==
On November 3, 2006, the Dayton Dragons, Cincinnati's Single-A affiliate, named Bragg the team's hitting coach for the 2007 season. After lasting two seasons in Dayton, Bragg was the Reds' minor league outfield coordinator for 10 years. He became the Triple-A Louisville Bats bench coach in April 2018. He was the bench coach of the Reds' Double-A Chattanooga Lookouts in 2019. He was the development coach of the Single-A Daytona Tortugas in 2021.

Bragg founded a youth sports training company called "The Hit Club" in Thomaston, Connecticut. He also heads "Thrive Sports and Fitness" in Middlebury, Connecticut.

== Personal life ==
Bragg resides in Southbury, Connecticut with his three children.

While at Georgia Tech, Bragg was arrested for burglary in Atlanta in 1991.
