= Bob Wells (baseball) =

American baseball player (born 1966)

- Pitcher
- Born: November 1, 1966 (age 59); Yakima, Washington, U.S.
- Batted: Right Threw: Right

MLB debut
- May 16, 1994, for the Philadelphia Phillies

Last MLB appearance
- September 29, 2002, for the Minnesota Twins

MLB statistics
- Win–loss record: 40–28
- Earned run average: 5.03
- Strikeouts: 417
- Stats at Baseball Reference

Teams
- Philadelphia Phillies (1994); Seattle Mariners (1994–1998); Minnesota Twins (1999–2002)

Robert Lee Wells (born November 1, 1966), is an American former professional baseball pitcher who played in Major League Baseball (MLB) from 1994 to 2002 with the He went on to play for the Philadelphia Phillies, Seattle Mariners, and Minnesota Twins.

Wells attended Eisenhower High School in Yakima, Washington, then Spokane Falls Community College. The Phillies signed him as a free agent on August 18, 1988. His 1991 season ended in July due to an elbow sprain. He had Tommy John surgery in 1992 after an elbow injury ended his season in June. He made his MLB debut with the Phillies in May 1994, pitching in six games as a reliever, but the team put him on waivers the following month.

The Mariners claimed Wells off waivers on June 30, 1994 on the recommendation of coach Lee Elia, who had managed Wells in the minors. Wells pitched once for the Mariners that season. In his rookie season in 1995, Wells started four games early in the season before settling into a relief role. He relieved ace Randy Johnson on May 17 against the Kansas City Royals, throwing 3 1/3 innings for his first win with Seattle. Wells had a 4–3 record and 5.71 ERA in 76 2/3 innings. He pitched 4 innings in the Mariners first postseason appearance, allowing a run in both of his two appearances.

Wells threw a career-high 130 2/3 innings in 1995. He joined the starting rotation in May, replacing an injured Johnson, and went 6–1 in his first 8 starts. "Wellsy is very important to us," manager Lou Piniella said in July. Wells finished with a 12–7 record and 5.30 ERA. He returned to a relief role in his last two seasons with the Mariners. He earned his first MLB save on July 20, 1997, prompting speculation that he could become the team's closer. "What the heck, give him the ball and see what he can do," said outfielder Jay Buhner. Wells got another save a week later, but Seattle acquired Heathcliff Slocumb to fill the closer role. Wells posted a 5.75 ERA in 1997 and 6.10 ERA in 1998. He missed a month of the 1998 season with an abdominal strain. The Mariners released him after that season.

The Twins signed Wells to a minor league contract in January 1999. He had his best seasons his first two years with Minnesota, leading the American League with 76 games pitched in 1999. The next year, he had a career-low 3.65 ERA and 10 saves but had an 0–7 record and 8 blown saves. He signed a two-year contract extension after the season. He pitched two more seasons for the Twins, with an ERA over 5.00 in each season.

Wells became the pitching coach of the Yakima Valley Pippins in 2014.

== Personal life ==
Wells is married and has three children. He lived in Yakima following his playing career.
