= Scott Davison (baseball player) =

American baseball player (born 1970)

- Pitcher
- Born: October 16, 1970 (age 55); Inglewood, California, U.S.
- Batted: Right Threw: Right

Professional debut
- MLB: September 4, 1995, for the Seattle Mariners
- NPB: April 4, 1998, for the Chiba Lotte Marines

Last appearance
- MLB: May 30, 1996, for the Seattle Mariners
- NPB: April 21, 1998, for the Chiba Lotte Marines

MLB statistics
- Win–loss: 0–0
- Earned run average: 8.10
- Strikeouts: 12

NPB statistics
- Win–loss: 0–1
- Earned run average: 2.35
- Strikeouts: 8
- Stats at Baseball Reference

Teams
- Seattle Mariners (1995–1996); Chiba Lotte Marines (1998)

Scotty Ray Davison (born October 16, 1970) is an American former professional baseball pitcher for the Seattle Mariners of Major League Baseball (MLB) (1995–1996) and Chiba Lotte Marines of Nippon Professional Baseball in 1998.

Davison attended Redondo Union High School, in Redondo Beach, California, graduating in 1988. That year, he was named the South Bay Player of the Year by the Los Angeles Times after batting .437 and pitching to a 18–1 win–loss record. He was inducted into the school's athletics hall of fame in 2013.

The Montreal Expos drafted Davison in the fourth round of the 1988 MLB draft as a shortstop, and he signed for a $50,000 signing bonus, forgoing a commitment to play college baseball for the USC Trojans. By 1990, he said he wanted to switch back to pitching, but Dan Duquette, the Expos assistant general manager, said the organization wanted him to improve as a hitter. After batting .168 with the 1991 West Palm Beach Expos, Montreal released him.

After working as an assistant coach at West Torrance High School and driving a UPS truck, the Mariners signed Davison as a pitcher in May 1994 following a try out in Long Beach, California. That year, he pitched at three minor league levels, earning seven saves in 13 games with the Bellingham Mariners, pitching four games with the Appleton Foxes, then posting a 6.14 earned run average (ERA) with the Triple-A Calgary Cannons. He also pitched in the Arizona Instructional League and Puerto Rican winter league that offseason. Bellingham pitching coach Bryan Price said Davison had a good fastball but poor command on his slider.

After pitching primarily in Double-A in 1995, Davidson was a September call-up and made his major league debut with the Mariners on September 4, pitching in three games as a reliever, with a 6.23 ERA. He did not pitch for the team in the postseason. He pitched in five more games for Seattle in May 1996, with a 9.00 ERA in his second and final MLB season. He went on the disabled list with a shoulder injury on June 12 and missed the rest of the season. He did not pitch due to injury in 1997. He signed with the San Diego Padres that November, but did not pitch for the team.

In 1998, Davison played for the Chiba Lotte Marines of the Nippon Professional Baseball (NPB), going 0–1 with a 2.35 ERA in five relief appearances. In 2001, he played for the independent St. George Pioneerzz of the Western Baseball League and the Tampa Bay Devil Rays' Triple-A affiliate, the Durham Bulls. He allowed 7 runs in 3 1/3 innings pitched for Durham.
