= Tim Davis (baseball) =

American baseball player (born 1970)

- Pitcher
- Born: July 14, 1970 (age 55); Marianna, Florida, U.S.
- Batted: Left Threw: Left

MLB debut
- April 4, 1994, for the Seattle Mariners

Last MLB appearance
- April 18, 1997, for the Seattle Mariners

MLB statistics
- Win–loss record: 6–5
- Earned run average: 4.62
- Strikeouts: 91
- Stats at Baseball Reference

Teams
- Seattle Mariners (1994–1997)

Timothy Howard Davis (born July 14, 1970) is an American former professional baseball pitcher who played for the Seattle Mariners of Major League Baseball (MLB) from 1994–1997.

Davis was drafted by the Mariners in the sixth round of the 1992 MLB draft out of Florida State University. He was first assigned to the Single-A Appleton Foxes of the Midwest League. In 16 games, he was 10–2 with a 1.85 ERA and 89 strikeouts. This performance earned Davis an All-Star berth and a promotion to the High-A Riverside Pilots. He started 1994 on the MLB roster and had a 4.01 ERA in 42 games. He was demoted to Triple-A Calgary in August, where he had a 1.80 ERA in 6 starts. After missing most of the 1995 season, he appeared in 40 games for the Mariners in 1996. In 1999, he pitched in the Tampa Bay Rays organization.

As of 2019, Davis works as an assistant principal at his alma mater, Liberty County High School in Bristol, Florida. Davis was previously the head coach of the school's baseball team.
