= Bobby Ayala =

American baseball player (born 1969)

- Pitcher
- Born: July 8, 1969 (age 57); Ventura, California, U.S.
- Batted: Right Threw: Right

MLB debut
- September 5, 1992, for the Cincinnati Reds

Last MLB appearance
- October 2, 1999, for the Chicago Cubs

MLB statistics
- Win–loss record: 37–44
- Earned run average: 4.78
- Strikeouts: 541
- Saves: 59
- Stats at Baseball Reference

Teams
- Cincinnati Reds (1992–1993); Seattle Mariners (1994–1998); Montreal Expos (1999); Chicago Cubs (1999)

Robert Joseph Ayala (born July 8, 1969) is an American former professional baseball player. He was a pitcher in Major League Baseball (MLB) for the Cincinnati Reds, Seattle Mariners, Montreal Expos, and Chicago Cubs from 1992 to 1999.

== Playing career ==
Ayala attended Rio Mesa High School in Oxnard, California. He signed as an undrafted free agent with Cincinnati in June 1988 and was brought up with the Reds as a starter before moving to the bullpen in his second season. The Reds traded Ayala with catcher Dan Wilson to the Mariners for second baseman Bret Boone and pitcher Erik Hanson in November 1993.

Ayala finished the strike-shortened 1994 season with a 2.86 earned run average (ERA) and 18 saves in 57 innings pitched. He led American League (AL) relievers with 71 strikeouts. He earned a career-high 19 saves during the Mariners' 1995 season, when the team won its first AL West title. He had a 10.38 ERA in four postseason games.

On April 24, 1996, Ayala suffered a severe hand laceration trying to open a hotel window in Chicago, missing almost two months on the disabled list.

In 1998, Ayala struggled to a 7.29 ERA over 62 games with a 1–10 win–loss record. He accrued negative 2.1 wins above replacement, the worst of his career. In a 2006 ESPN article, writer Jim Caple listed Ayala as one of the Mariners' "Hometown Bums", noting he finished the season with more blown saves (9) than saves (8). The Seattle Times later called Ayala "the man that fans love hate".

The Mariners traded Ayala to Montreal for minor league pitcher Jimmy Turman on April 3, 1999, with Seattle paying all of Ayala's $1.8 million salary that year. Montreal released him a few months later, and he finished the season pitching for the Chicago Cubs.

The Minnesota Twins signed Ayala as a free agent, making him a non-roster invitee for the 2000 season. They released him before the start of the regular season. He started the regular season pitching for the Triple-A Iowa Cubs. After starting 1–2 with a 4.61 ERA, he was released on May 8. On May 18, he signed with the Los Angeles Dodgers' Triple-A affiliate, the Albuquerque Dukes. Two months and nine saves later, the Dukes released him.

== Personal life ==
Ayala and his wife have a son.

Following his playing career, Ayala lived in Arizona.
