= Rafael Carmona =

Puerto Rican baseball player (1972–2021)

- Pitcher
- Born: October 2, 1972; Río Piedras, Puerto Rico
- Died: August 2, 2021 (aged 48); Comerío, Puerto Rico
- Batted: Left Threw: Right

MLB debut
- May 18, 1995, for the Seattle Mariners

Last MLB appearance
- June 12, 1999, for the Seattle Mariners

MLB statistics
- Win–loss record: 11–7
- Earned run average: 4.94
- Strikeouts: 96
- Stats at Baseball Reference

Teams
- Seattle Mariners (1995–1997, 1999)

Rafael Carmona (October 2, 1972 – August 2, 2021) was a Puerto Rican former Major League Baseball pitcher for the Seattle Mariners from 1995 to 1999.

Carmona attended Juano Colon High School in Comerío, Puerto Rico, then Indian Hills Community College. He helped the Indian Hills team reach the 1993 JUCO World Series. He was 2–0 with 13 saves in the regular season and picked up three more saves in the postseason.

The Mariners selected Carmona in the 13th round of the 1993 MLB draft. He was a California League All-Star in 1994, finishing second in the league in saves. He made his MLB debut in May 1995, which led his hometown of Comerío to throw a carnival in his honor. He made his first MLB start on May 29 against the New York Yankees in Derek Jeter's MLB debut. In 1996, his best season in the majors, Carmona led Mariners relievers with 90 1/3 innings pitched, going 8–3 with one save, a 4.28 earned run average, and 62 strikeouts.

On November 30, 1997, Carmona was in a car accident in Puerto Rico. He broke two bones in his right forearm, derailing his career. He briefly returned to the majors in 1999, ending his playing career in Triple-A in 2000.

Carmona died on August 2, 2021. He was married. He was posthumously inducted into Indian Hills' athletics hall of fame in 2023.

== See also ==
- List of Major League Baseball players from Puerto Rico
