= Chris Bosio =

American baseball player and coach (born 1963)

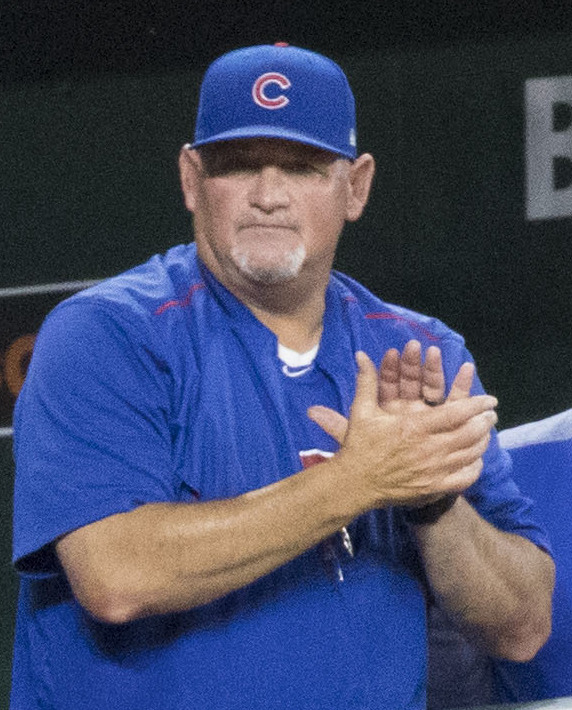
- Bosio with the Chicago Cubs in 2017
- Pitcher
- Born: April 3, 1963 (age 63); Carmichael, California, U.S.
- Batted: Right Threw: Right

MLB debut
- August 3, 1986, for the Milwaukee Brewers

Last MLB appearance
- September 22, 1996, for the Seattle Mariners

MLB statistics
- Win–loss record: 94–93
- Earned run average: 3.96
- Strikeouts: 1,059
- Stats at Baseball Reference

Teams
- As player: Milwaukee Brewers (1986–1992); Seattle Mariners (1993–1996); As coach: Tampa Bay Devil Rays (2003); Milwaukee Brewers (2009); Chicago Cubs (2012–2017); Detroit Tigers (2018)

Career highlights and awards
- World Series champion (2016); Pitched a no-hitter on April 22, 1993; Milwaukee Brewers Wall of Honor

Christopher Louis Bosio (/ˈbɒziːoʊ/ BOZ-ee-oh; born April 3, 1963) is an American former professional baseball pitcher and pitching coach. He played in Major League Baseball (MLB) for the Milwaukee Brewers and Seattle Mariners from 1986 to 1996. As a player, he was listed at 6 feet 3 inches (1.91 m) and 225 pounds (102 kg); he threw and batted right-handed. Bosio has served as a pitching coach in MLB for the Brewers, Tampa Bay Devil Rays, Chicago Cubs, and Detroit Tigers.

== Playing career ==
Bosio attended Cordova High School in Rancho Cordova, California, and Sacramento City College. He was first drafted by the Pittsburgh Pirates in the 29th round of the 1981 MLB draft, but he did not sign. The Milwaukee Brewers subsequently selected him in the second round of the 1982 MLB draft's secondary phase, held in January; he signed with the Brewers in June 1982.

=== Milwaukee Brewers ===
Bosio played in Milwaukee's farm system for the 1982 through 1985 seasons, and partially during 1986, the year of his MLB debut. After playing for Rookie League and Class A Beloit Brewers teams through 1984, Bosio spent 1985 with the Double-A El Paso Diablos, compiling an 11–6 record in 28 games (25 starts). In 1986, he spent most of the season with the Triple-A Vancouver Canadians, appearing in 44 games (all in relief); he had a 7–3 record with a 2.28 ERA in 67 innings pitched.

Bosio made his MLB debut on August 3, 1986, against the Texas Rangers. He pitched three innings in relief, giving up three hits and one run, with one strikeout, Pete Incaviglia. He made a total of 10 appearances (four starts) with the 1986 Brewers, with a 7.01 ERA and an 0–4 record.

In 1987, Bosio had an 11–8 record with 5.24 ERA in 46 appearances (19 starts). His record fell to 7–15 in 1988, when he made 38 appearances (22 starts) with a 3.36 ERA. In 1989, his record improved to 15–10, when he appeared in 33 games (all starts) and had a 2.95 ERA.

In 1990, Bosio's 20 appearances were all starts; he pitched to a 4–9 record with a 4.00 ERA. In 1991, his record improved to 14–10 with a 3.25 ERA, in 32 games played (all starts). His record further improved to 16–6 in 1992, with a 3.62 ERA in 33 appearances (all starts).

In seven seasons with the Brewers, Bosio appeared in 212 games (163 starts) with an overall record of 67–62, 749 strikeouts, 289 walks, and a 3.76 ERA in 1190 innings pitched.

Bosio became a free agent after the 1992 season.

=== Seattle Mariners ===
The Seattle Mariners signed Bosio in December 1992.

On April 22, 1993, Bosio was the second pitcher in Mariners' history to pitch a no-hitter, when he retired 27 straight Boston Red Sox batters after walking the first two. The last out was made when shortstop Omar Vizquel bare-handed a high chopper over the mound by Ernest Riles and threw him out. It stood as the most recent no-hitter for the Mariners until the team's six-pitcher effort against the Los Angeles Dodgers on June 8, 2012, as well as the most recent no-hitter by a single Mariners pitcher until Félix Hernández's perfect game on August 15, 2012. On June 25, 1993, Bosio made the only non-pitching appearance of his career, entering a game against the Chicago White Sox as a pinch runner for Bret Boone; he did not have a plate appearance. Manager Lou Piniella inserted Bosio in the game to qualify as an appearance, so Bosio could subsequently start serving a pending suspension for his involvement in a brawl. With the 1993 Mariners, Bosio appeared in 29 games (24 starts), compiling a 3.45 ERA and a 9–9 record.

In 1994, Bosio had a 4–10 record with 4.32 ERA in 19 games (all starts). His record improved to 10–8 in 1995, when he played in 31 games (all starts) and had a 4.92 ERA. Bosio's only postseason appearances were in 1995. He started two games in the ALDS against the New York Yankees, pitching a total of 7 2/3 innings and giving up nine earned runs (10.57 ERA); he did not record a win or a loss. Seattle advanced to the ALCS, losing in six games to the Cleveland Indians. Bosio started Game 5, giving up three runs (two earned) in 5 1/3 innings and taking the loss.

Bosio had a career-high 5.93 ERA in 1996, when he appeared in 18 games (nine starts) with a 4–4 record. He was granted free agency in November 1996.

In four seasons with the Mariners, Bosio appeared in 97 games (83 starts) with an overall record of 27–31, 310 strikeouts, 192 walks, and a 4.43 ERA in 520 innings pitched.

=== Late career ===
In August 1997, Bosio signed with the Boston Red Sox organization, making two appearances with their Rookie League team, and one appearance in Class A-Advanced. At the time, he had undergone a total of nine knee surgeries during his career. Bosio did not pitch professionally after the 1997 season.

== Coaching career ==
After retiring as a player, Bosio began a career in coaching In 1998. He was a special assignment pitching coach in the Seattle Mariners' organization from 1998 to 2002. In 2001, he was the pitching coach for the Triple-A Tacoma Rainiers. The Rainiers were 2001 co-champions of the Pacific Coast League (PCL) and Bosio led their pitching staff to the lowest earned run average in the PCL, working with future-Major Leaguers Brian Fuentes, Brett Tomko, and Joel Piñeiro. He also had the most valuable pitcher in Denny Stark, who went 16–2 with a 2.43 ERA. Bosio also served as an advanced scout for the Mariners during their 116-win season.

In 2003, Bosio was the Tampa Bay Devil Rays pitching coach for Lou Piniella. Leaving baseball after the 2003 season for family health reasons, Bosio moved his family to Appleton, Wisconsin. In 2006, he was the assistant pitching coach at the University of Wisconsin–Oshkosh, and in 2007 the pitching coach and then interim manager at Lawrence University.

Bosio joined the Cincinnati Reds organization in 2008, serving as pitching coach at their Double-A Chattanooga Lookouts. He was named to the same position for 2009 with the Carolina Mudcats, the Reds' new Double-A affiliate, but instead signed on with the Milwaukee Brewers' farm system. During the 2009 season he served as the Triple-A Nashville Sounds pitching coach. He helped lead the Sounds' pitching staff to the lowest earned run average in the PCL at the time of his promotion to the major league coaching staff, when on August 12 he replaced Bill Castro as pitching coach for the Brewers. In October 2009, Bosio was named major league advanced scout for the Brewers.

Bosio joined the Chicago Cubs coaching staff before the 2012 season, as part of team president Theo Epstein's revamping of the organization. Bosio spent six seasons as Cubs' pitching coach, and received his first championship ring when the Cubs won the 2016 World Series, their first championship in 108 years. On July 7, 2016, Bosio and outfielder Albert Almora, Jr. reacted to a fan who fell onto the field before a game at Wrigley Field. Bosio was fired by the Cubs on October 21, 2017.

On November 2, 2017, Bosio was named the pitching coach for the Detroit Tigers under their new manager, Ron Gardenhire, for the 2018 season. Bosio's contract with the Tigers was terminated on June 27, 2018, due to "insensitive comments that violated Club policy and his Uniform Employee Contract." Bosio claimed that the offending comment was referring to relief pitcher Daniel Stumpf, who is white, as a "spider monkey"—due to the faces he makes while lifting weights—which was overheard and misunderstood by an African American clubhouse attendant. However, follow-up reports by the Detroit Free Press and The Athletic contained accounts from multiple eyewitnesses who contradicted Bosio's claim, and Stumpf himself claimed that he had never heard the nickname.

== Personal life ==
With his first wife of 21 years, Suzanne Du Vall Bosio, Bosio has two children—he remarried in 2016 to Heather Compeau. Bosio currently provides pitching and hitting lessons for players in Phoenix, Arizona.

== See also ==
- List of Major League Baseball no-hitters

Achievements
Preceded by Kevin Gross	No-hitter pitcher April 22, 1993	Succeeded by Jim Abbott

Sporting positions
Preceded by Jackie Brown	Tampa Bay Devil Rays pitching coach 2003	Succeeded by Chuck Hernandez
Preceded by Bill Castro	Milwaukee Brewers pitching coach 2009 (after August 11)	Succeeded by Rick Peterson
Preceded by Mark Riggins	Chicago Cubs pitching coach 2012–2017	Succeeded by Jim Hickey
Preceded by Rich Dubee	Detroit Tigers pitching coach 2018 (until June 27)	Succeeded by Rick Anderson
