= Rich Amaral =

American baseball player (born 1962)

- Utility player
- Born: April 1, 1962 (age 64); Visalia, California, U.S.
- Batted: Right Threw: Right

MLB debut
- May 27, 1991, for the Seattle Mariners

Last MLB appearance
- June 14, 2000, for the Baltimore Orioles

MLB statistics
- Batting average: .276
- Home runs: 11
- Runs batted in: 159
- Stats at Baseball Reference

Teams
- Seattle Mariners (1991–1998); Baltimore Orioles (1999–2000)

Richard Louis Amaral (born April 1, 1962) is an American former professional baseball utility player. He played in Major League Baseball (MLB) for the Seattle Mariners (1991–1998), and Baltimore Orioles (1999–2000). After retiring, he has worked as a scout for the Orioles.

== Playing career ==
Amaral attended Estancia High School and then Orange Coast College in Costa Mesa, California. He then transferred to UCLA and was named a first-team All-American by The Sporting News in 1983.

Drafted by the Chicago Cubs in second round of the 1983 MLB draft, Amaral was claimed by the Chicago White Sox in the 1988 Rule 5 Draft. After becoming a free agent after the 1990 season, he signed with the Seattle Mariners. He made his major league debut on May 27, 1991. After winning the 1991 Pacific Coast League batting title, hitting .346 with Calgary Cannons, and batting .318 in 1992, Amaral got his chance to become a full-time major league player at age 31 under new manager Lou Piniella in 1993. He played in 110 games that season, finishing fifth in Rookie of the Year voting and was the oldest rookie in the majors. Amaral was the first-ever batter at Jacobs Field in Cleveland, hitting a groundout against future Mariners teammate Dennis Martínez on April 4, 1994. Amaral played with the Mariners through 1998, then signed as a free agent with the Orioles on December 21, 1998. Released by the Orioles on July 28, 2000, he signed with the Atlanta Braves on August 25. Amaral played seven games for the Triple-A Richmond Braves, then became a free agent after the season. Amaral stayed in playing shape but chose to retire after no team offered him a contract for 2001.

In his 10-year MLB career, Amaral hit .276 with 493 hits and 112 stolen bases. A versatile player, Amaral played at least 41 games in the majors at every position except catcher and pitcher.

== Post-playing career and personal life ==
Amaral's friend and former teammate, fellow former major leaguer Jeff Gardner, threw Amaral a retirement party in 2001.

Amaral was a baserunning guest instructor for the Mariners in spring training of 2008 as part of Mariners manager John McLaren's offseason emphasis on baserunning.

Amaral worked as a scout for the Kansas City Royals since at least 2010, helping the team draft Nick Pratto in 2017. Amaral became a scout for the Baltimore Orioles in June 2018. He is based in Huntington Beach, California.

Three of Amaral's four children also played sports at UCLA. Beau Amaral played outfield for the UCLA team that finished second in the 2010 College World Series. Beau was named to the All Tournament Team. The Cincinnati Reds drafted Beau in 2014, and he played in the minors until 2018, playing in Triple-A in two seasons, before playing in the Mexican League through 2023.

Amaral's daughter Jessica played softball at UCLA, playing primarily as a pinch runner.

Amaral's son Daniel played baseball at UCLA, being named to the All-Pac 12 Defensive team as an outfielder. The Pittsburgh Pirates drafted Daniel in the 14th round of the 2018 MLB draft. He played in the minors through 2023, reaching Double-A, before playing in the Mexican and independent leagues. Daniel self-published a book on base stealing in 2025.
