= 1995 Milwaukee Brewers season =

1995 Milwaukee Brewers
- League: American League
- Division: Central
- Ballpark: Milwaukee County Stadium
- City: Milwaukee, Wisconsin, United States
- Record: 65–79 (.451)
- Divisional place: 4th
- Owners: Bud Selig
- General managers: Sal Bando
- Managers: Phil Garner
- Television: WVTV (Jim Paschke, Bill Schroeder)
- Radio: WTMJ (AM) (Bob Uecker, Pat Hughes)

The 1995 Milwaukee Brewers season was the 26th season for the Brewers in Milwaukee, and their 27th overall. The Brewers finished fourth in the American League Central with a record of 65 wins and 79 losses. The 1995 Brewers were the last Major League Baseball team to use a bullpen car, until the 2018 Arizona Diamondbacks.

== Offseason ==
- October 14, 1994: Alex Diaz was selected off waivers from the Brewers by the Seattle Mariners.

== Regular season ==
=== Season standings ===
AL Central
Team	W	L	Pct.	GB	Home	Road
Cleveland Indians	100	44	.694	—	54‍–‍18	46‍–‍26
Kansas City Royals	70	74	.486	30	35‍–‍37	35‍–‍37
Chicago White Sox	68	76	.472	32	38‍–‍34	30‍–‍42
Milwaukee Brewers	65	79	.451	35	33‍–‍39	32‍–‍40
Minnesota Twins	56	88	.389	44	29‍–‍43	27‍–‍45

=== Record vs. opponents ===
1995 American League record Source: MLB Standings Grid – 1995
Team	BAL	BOS	CAL	CWS	CLE	DET	KC	MIL	MIN	NYY	OAK	SEA	TEX	TOR
Baltimore	—	4–9	9–4	6–1	2–10	8–5	4–5	7–5	3–6	6–7	5–7	6–7	4–1	7–6
Boston	9–4	—	11–3	5–3	6–7	8–5	3–2	8–4	5–4	5–8	8–4	7–5	3–4	8–5
California	4–9	3–11	—	10–2	3–2	6–2	5–7	5–2	8–5	7–5	6–7	7–6	6–7	8–2
Chicago	1–6	3–5	2–10	—	5–8	8–4	8–5	6–7	10–3	3–2–1	7–5	4–9	5–7	6–5
Cleveland	10–2	7–6	2–3	8–5	—	10–3	11–1	9–4	9–4	6–6	7–0	5–4	6–3	10–3
Detroit	5–8	5–8	2–6	4–8	3–10	—	3–4	8–5	7–5	5–8	2–3	5–5	4–8	7–6
Kansas City	5–4	2–3	7–5	5–8	1–11	4–3	—	10–2	6–7	3–7	5–8	7–5	8–6	7–5
Milwaukee	5–7	4–8	2–5	7–6	4–9	5–8	2–10	—	9–4	5–6	7–2	3–2	5–7	7–5
Minnesota	6–3	4–5	5–8	3–10	4–9	5–7	7–6	4–9	—	3–4	5–7	4–8	5–8	1–4
New York	7–6	8–5	5–7	2–3–1	6–6	8–5	7–3	6–5	4–3	—	4–9	4–9	6–3	12–1
Oakland	7–5	4–8	7–6	5–7	0–7	3–2	8–5	2–7	7–5	9–4	—	7–6	5–8	3–7
Seattle	7–6	5–7	6–7	9–4	4–5	5–5	5–7	2–3	8–4	9–4	6–7	—	10–3	3–4
Texas	1–4	4–3	7–6	7–5	3–6	8–4	6–8	7–5	8–5	3–6	8–5	3–10	—	9–3
Toronto	6–7	5–8	2–8	5–6	3–10	6–7	5–7	5–7	4–1	1–12	7–3	4–3	3–9	—

=== Notable transactions ===
- March 24, 1995: Joe Oliver was signed as a free agent by the Brewers.
- April 7, 1995: B. J. Surhoff was signed as a free agent by the Brewers.

==== Draft picks ====
- June 1, 1995: Geoff Jenkins was drafted by the Brewers in the 1st round (9th pick) of the 1995 Major League Baseball draft. Player signed July 17, 1995.

=== Roster ===
1995 Milwaukee Brewers
Roster
Pitchers: 25 Ricky Bones; 29 Jeff Bronkey; 49 Rob Dibble; 21 Cal Eldred; 36 Mike Fetters; 13 Brian Givens; 40 Mike Ignasiak; 42 Scott Karl; 43 Mark Kiefer; 37 Graeme Lloyd; 31 Jamie McAndrew; 41 José Mercedes; 38 Ángel Miranda; 47 Al Reyes; 33 Ron Rightnowar; 51 Sid Roberson; 39 Bob Scanlan; 48 Joe Slusarski; 50 Steve Sparks; 53 Mike Thomas; 46 Bill Wegman; 52 Kevin Wickander	Catchers: 22 Mike Matheny; 9 Joe Oliver; Infielders: 26 Jeff Cirillo; 32 John Jaha; 16 Pat Listach; 8 Mark Loretta; 20 Kevin Seitzer; 8 Tim Unroe; 2 José Valentín; 1 Fernando Viña	Outfielders: 24 Darryl Hamilton; 15 David Hulse; 12 Derrick May; 30 Matt Mieske; 11 Dave Nilsson; 18 Duane Singleton; 5 B. J. Surhoff; 27 Turner Ward; Other batters: 23 Greg Vaughn	Manager: 3 Phil Garner; Coaches: 35 Bill Castro (Bullpen); 10 Duffy Dyer (Third Base); 14 Tim Foli (First Base); 28 Lamar Johnson (Hitting); 45 Don Rowe (Pitching)

== Player stats ==
=== Batting ===
==== Starters by position ====
Note: Pos = Position; G = Games played; AB = At bats; H = Hits; Avg. = Batting average; HR = Home runs; RBI = Runs batted in

Pos	Player	G	AB	H	Avg.	HR	RBI
C	Joe Oliver	97	337	92	.273	12	51
1B	John Jaha	88	316	99	.313	20	65
2B	Fernando Viña	113	288	74	.257	3	29
SS	José Valentín	112	338	74	.219	11	49
3B	Kevin Seitzer	132	492	153	.311	5	69
LF	B. J. Surhoff	117	415	133	.320	13	73
CF	Darryl Hamilton	112	398	108	.271	5	44
RF	Matt Mieske	117	267	67	.251	12	48
DH	Greg Vaughn	108	392	88	.224	17	59

==== Other batters ====
Note: G = Games played; AB = At bats; H = Hits; Avg. = Batting average; HR = Home runs; RBI = Runs batted in

Player	G	AB	H	Avg.	HR	RBI
David Hulse	119	339	85	.251	3	47
Pat Listach	101	334	73	.219	0	25
Jeff Cirillo	125	328	91	.277	9	39
Dave Nilsson	81	263	73	.278	12	53
Mike Matheny	80	166	41	.247	0	21
Turner Ward	44	129	34	.264	4	16
Derrick May	32	113	28	.248	1	9
Mark Loretta	19	50	13	.260	1	3
Duane Singleton	13	31	2	.065	0	0
Tim Unroe	2	4	1	.250	0	0

=== Pitching ===
==== Starting pitchers ====
Note: G = Games pitched; IP = Innings pitched; W = Wins; L = Losses; ERA = Earned run average; SO = Strikeouts

Player	G	IP	W	L	ERA	SO
Steve Sparks	33	202.0	9	11	4.63	96
Ricky Bones	32	200.1	10	12	4.63	77
Scott Karl	25	124.0	6	7	4.14	59
Brian Givens	19	107.1	5	7	4.95	73
Bob Scanlan	17	83.1	4	7	6.59	29
Cal Eldred	4	23.2	1	1	3.42	18

==== Other pitchers ====
Note: G = Games pitched; IP = Innings pitched; W = Wins; L = Losses; ERA = Earned run average; SO = Strikeouts

Player	G	IP	W	L	ERA	SO
Sid Roberson	26	84.1	6	4	5.76	40
Ángel Miranda	30	74.0	4	5	5.23	45
Jamie McAndrew	10	36.1	2	3	4.71	19

==== Relief pitchers ====
Note: G = Games pitched; W = Wins; L = Losses; SV = Saves; ERA = Earned run average; SO = Strikeouts

Player	G	W	L	SV	ERA	SO
Mike Fetters	40	0	3	22	3.38	33
Bill Wegman	37	5	7	2	5.35	50
Ron Rightnowar	34	2	1	1	5.40	22
Graeme Lloyd	33	0	5	4	4.50	13
Al Reyes	27	1	1	1	2.43	29
Mike Ignasiak	25	4	1	0	5.90	26
Mark Kiefer	24	4	1	0	3.44	41
Rob Dibble	15	1	1	0	8.25	10
Joe Slusarski	12	1	1	0	5.40	6
Jeff Bronkey	8	0	0	0	3.65	5
Kevin Wickander	8	0	0	0	0.00	2
José Mercedes	5	0	1	0	9.82	6
Mike Thomas	1	0	0	0	0.00	0

== Farm system ==
The Brewers' farm system consisted of seven minor league affiliates in 1995. The Brewers operated a Dominican Summer League team as a co-op with the Houston Astros. The Beloit Snappers won the Midwest League championship, and the Helena Brewers won the Pioneer League championship.

Level	Team	League	Manager
Triple-A	New Orleans Zephyrs	American Association	Chris Bando
Double-A	El Paso Diablos	Texas League	Tim Ireland
Class A-Advanced	Stockton Ports	California League	Bob Mariano
Class A	Beloit Snappers	Midwest League	Dub Kilgo
Rookie	Helena Brewers	Pioneer League	Alex Morales
Rookie	AZL Brewers	Arizona League	Ralph Dickenson
Rookie	DSL Astros/Brewers	Dominican Summer League	—
