= 1995 Cleveland Indians season =

1995 Cleveland Indians
- American League Champion; American League Central Division Champion
- Members of the team during the 20th anniversary celebration in 2015.
- League: American League
- Division: Central
- Ballpark: Jacobs Field
- City: Cleveland, Ohio
- Record: 100–44 (.694)
- Divisional place: 1st
- Owners: Richard Jacobs
- General managers: John Hart
- Managers: Mike Hargrove
- Television: WUAB; Jack Corrigan, Mike Hegan; SportsChannel; John Sanders, Rick Manning
- Radio: WKNR (1220 AM); Herb Score, Tom Hamilton

The 1995 Cleveland Indians season was the 95th season for the franchise.

This season led to the Indians returning to the World Series and their first postseason of any kind since 1954. The season started late by 18 games due to the 1994 strike, giving it just 144 games. The Indians finished in first place in the American League Central Division with a record of 100 wins and 44 losses. This was the first team in the history of the American League ever to win 100 games in a season that had fewer than 154 games.

The most outstanding pitcher for the Indians was their relief pitcher, José Mesa, who finished second in the voting for the American League's Cy Young Award. Mesa pitched in 62 games; he led the league by being the finishing pitcher in 57 games, and he saved a league-leading 46 games, even though he pitched just exactly 64 innings. Mesa was the winning pitcher in three games, and he lost none. Mesa's earned run average was a microscopic 1.13. Mesa only gave up eight earned runs, one unearned run, and three home runs in the entire regular season.

The most outstanding batter and everyday player for the Indians was their left fielder, Albert Belle, who finished second in the voting for the American League's Most Valuable Player Award. Belle played in 143 of the 144 games, and became the first major leaguer to hit 50 doubles and 50 home runs in a single season. Belle led the league in runs scored (121), runs batted in (126), doubles (52), home runs (50), total bases (377), and slugging percentage (.690). Belle had 173 hits and a batting average of .317.

The second most outstanding batter and everyday player for the Indians was their right fielder, Manny Ramirez. Ramirez played in 137 games, scored 85 runs, batted in 107 runs, hit 26 doubles and 31 home runs, had 149 hits, and batted .308.

On a team that was led by its outfielders in batting, the Indians center fielder Kenny Lofton, playing in just 118 games, also had 149 hits, scored 93 runs, batted .310, and led the American League with 13 triples and 54 stolen bases. This was Lofton's fourth of five consecutive years leading the American League in stolen bases. Lofton also won a Gold Glove in the outfield. Despite Lofton only hitting seven home runs he still finished the shortened season with 53 runs batted in.

The Indians won the Central Division by an overwhelming 30 games over the second-place Kansas City Royals, and they went into the playoffs going strong. In their American League Division Series, the Indians defeated the Boston Red Sox in a three-game sweep. Next, in the American League Championship Series, the Indians defeated the Seattle Mariners four games to two. The Indians' starting pitcher, Orel Hershiser, was voted the American League Championship Series' Most Valuable Player.

In the World Series, the Indians faced the Atlanta Braves (champions of the National League for the third time in four years), who had finished the regular season with a 90–54 record, had defeated the Colorado Rockies three games to one in the National League Division Series, and had swept the Cincinnati Reds four games to none in the National League Championship Series. The Braves had the National League's Cy Young Award winner in Greg Maddux, who finished the season with a 19–2 won-loss record and a 1.63 earned run average as a starting pitcher. Maddux also finished in third place in the voting for Most Valuable Player.

The Indians lost the World Series to the Braves by four games to two, with the Braves winning all three games in Atlanta, and the Indians winning two out of three games in Cleveland. The World Series Most Valuable Player was the starting pitcher Tom Glavine of the Braves, who won two games in the Series.

== Offseason ==
- November 9, 1994: Derek Lilliquist was selected off waivers from the Indians by the Atlanta Braves.
- November 18, 1994: Paul Byrd, Jerry Dipoto, Dave Mlicki and a player to be named later were traded by the Indians to the New York Mets for Jeromy Burnitz and Joe Roa. The Indians completed the deal by sending Jesus Azuaje (minors) to the Mets on December 6.
- November 21, 1994: Torey Lovullo was signed as a free agent by the Indians.
- March 25, 1995: Billy Ripken was signed as a free agent with the Indians. However, Ripken only played in six games for the Indians.

== Regular season ==
The Indians led the Majors in nearly every offensive category, including runs scored (840), hits (1,461), home runs (207), runs batted in (803), batting average (.291) and slugging percentage (.479). They also struck out the fewest times (766) of all 28 MLB teams. They also had one of the most formidable pitching staffs in the AL, allowing the second-fewest hits (1,261), finishing with the best ERA (3.83), the fewest runs allowed (607), fewest earned runs allowed (554), the most saves (50) and the fewest intentional walks (16).

=== Season standings ===
AL Central
Team	W	L	Pct.	GB	Home	Road
Cleveland Indians	100	44	.694	—	54‍–‍18	46‍–‍26
Kansas City Royals	70	74	.486	30	35‍–‍37	35‍–‍37
Chicago White Sox	68	76	.472	32	38‍–‍34	30‍–‍42
Milwaukee Brewers	65	79	.451	35	33‍–‍39	32‍–‍40
Minnesota Twins	56	88	.389	44	29‍–‍43	27‍–‍45

=== Record vs. opponents ===
1995 American League record Source: MLB Standings Grid – 1995
Team	BAL	BOS	CAL	CWS	CLE	DET	KC	MIL	MIN	NYY	OAK	SEA	TEX	TOR
Baltimore	—	4–9	9–4	6–1	2–10	8–5	4–5	7–5	3–6	6–7	5–7	6–7	4–1	7–6
Boston	9–4	—	11–3	5–3	6–7	8–5	3–2	8–4	5–4	5–8	8–4	7–5	3–4	8–5
California	4–9	3–11	—	10–2	3–2	6–2	5–7	5–2	8–5	7–5	6–7	7–6	6–7	8–2
Chicago	1–6	3–5	2–10	—	5–8	8–4	8–5	6–7	10–3	3–2–1	7–5	4–9	5–7	6–5
Cleveland	10–2	7–6	2–3	8–5	—	10–3	11–1	9–4	9–4	6–6	7–0	5–4	6–3	10–3
Detroit	5–8	5–8	2–6	4–8	3–10	—	3–4	8–5	7–5	5–8	2–3	5–5	4–8	7–6
Kansas City	5–4	2–3	7–5	5–8	1–11	4–3	—	10–2	6–7	3–7	5–8	7–5	8–6	7–5
Milwaukee	5–7	4–8	2–5	7–6	4–9	5–8	2–10	—	9–4	5–6	7–2	3–2	5–7	7–5
Minnesota	6–3	4–5	5–8	3–10	4–9	5–7	7–6	4–9	—	3–4	5–7	4–8	5–8	1–4
New York	7–6	8–5	5–7	2–3–1	6–6	8–5	7–3	6–5	4–3	—	4–9	4–9	6–3	12–1
Oakland	7–5	4–8	7–6	5–7	0–7	3–2	8–5	2–7	7–5	9–4	—	7–6	5–8	3–7
Seattle	7–6	5–7	6–7	9–4	4–5	5–5	5–7	2–3	8–4	9–4	6–7	—	10–3	3–4
Texas	1–4	4–3	7–6	7–5	3–6	8–4	6–8	7–5	8–5	3–6	8–5	3–10	—	9–3
Toronto	6–7	5–8	2–8	5–6	3–10	6–7	5–7	5–7	4–1	1–12	7–3	4–3	3–9	—

=== Notable transactions ===
- April 5, 1995: Dave Winfield was signed as a free agent by the Indians. However, Winfield only played in 39 games as a designated hitter in the regular season, and none in the postseason, and he retired at the end of the season.
- April 10, 1995: Paul Assenmacher was signed as a free agent by the Indians.
- April 25, 1995: Bud Black was signed as a free agent by the Indians.
- May 5, 1995: Casey Candaele was signed as a free agent by the Indians.
- May 15, 1995: Matt Williams was traded by the Indians to the Houston Astros for Eddie Tucker.
- June 6, 1995: Todd Frohwirth was signed as a free agent by the Indians.
- July 14, 1995: Bud Black was released by the Indians.
- July 27, 1995: David Bell, Rick Heiserman, and Pepe McNeal (minors) were traded by the Indians to the St. Louis Cardinals for Ken Hill.

=== Roster ===
1995 Cleveland Indians
Roster
Pitchers: 45 Paul Assenmacher; 40 Bud Black; 54 Mark Clark; 27 Dennis Cook; 56 Alan Embree; 52 John Farrell; 48 Jason Grimsley; 55 Orel Hershiser; 44 Ken Hill; 59 Albie Lopez; 32 Dennis Martínez; 49 José Mesa; 41 Charles Nagy; 37 Chad Ogea; 30 Gregg Olson; 38 Eric Plunk; 62 Jim Poole; 47 Joe Roa; 53 Paul Shuey; 50 Julián Tavárez	Catchers: 15 Sandy Alomar Jr.; 12 Jesse Levis; 17 Tony Peña; 16 Eddie Tucker; Infielders: 9 Carlos Baerga; 4 David Bell; 10 Álvaro Espinoza; 33 Eddie Murray; 36 Herbert Perry; 16 Billy Ripken; 11 Paul Sorrento; 25 Jim Thome; 13 Omar Vizquel	Outfielders: 20 Rubén Amaro Jr.; 8 Albert Belle; 23 Jeromy Burnitz; 58 Brian Giles; 35 Wayne Kirby; 7 Kenny Lofton; 24 Manny Ramírez; Other batters: 31 Dave Winfield	Manager: 21 Mike Hargrove; Coaches: 26 Buddy Bell (Infield); 6 Luis Isaac (Bullpen); 42 Charlie Manuel (Hitting); 1 Dave Nelson (First base); 29 Jeff Newman (Third base); 28 Mark Wiley (Pitching)

=== Game log ===
Legend
Indians Win	Indians Loss	Game postponed

1995 Regular Season Game Log (100–44) (Home: 54–18; Road: 46–26)
April: 2–2 (Road: 2–2)

#	Date	Opponent	Score	Win	Loss	Save	Stadium	Attendance	Record	Streak
1	April 27	@ Rangers	11–6	Martinez (1–0)	Gross (0–1)	–	The Ballpark in Arlington	32,161	1–0	W1
2	April 28	@ Rangers	9–10	Whiteside (1–0)	Poole (0–1)	Russell (1)	The Ballpark in Arlington	22,179	1–1	L1
3	April 29	@ Rangers	5–6	Burrows (1–0)	Shuey (0–1)	–	The Ballpark in Arlington	28,048	1–2	L2
4	April 30	@ Rangers	7–6 (12)	Mesa (1–0)	Whiteside (1–1)	–	The Ballpark in Arlington	26,026	2–2	W1

May: 19–7 (Home: 9–3, Road: 10–4)

#	Date	Opponent	Score	Win	Loss	Save	Stadium	Attendance	Record	Streak
5	May 2	@ Tigers	11–1	Martinez (2–0)	Bergman (0–2)	–	Tiger Stadium	39,398	3–2	W2
6	May 3	@ Tigers	14–7	Clark (1–0)	Doherty (0–2)	–	Tiger Stadium	29,996	4–2	W3
7	May 4	@ Tigers	3–4	Wells (1–1)	Hershiser (0–1)	Henneman (1)	Tiger Stadium	28,846	4–3	L1
8	May 5	Twins	5–1	Nagy (1–0)	Erickson (0–3)	Mesa (1)	Jacobs Field	41,434	5–3	W1
9	May 6	Twins	2–5	Radke (1–0)	Black (0–1)	Aguilera (4)	Jacobs Field	37,325	5–4	L1
10	May 7	Twins	10–9 (17)	Poole (1–1)	Guthrie (1–1)	–	Jacobs Field	39,431	6–4	W1
11	May 8	Royals	6–2	Clark (2–0)	Appier (3–1)	Grimsley (1)	Jacobs Field	26,704	7–4	W2
12	May 9	Royals	10–0	Hershiser (1–1)	Linton (0–1)	–	Jacobs Field	27,225	8–4	W3
13	May 10	Royals	3–2 (10)	Plunk (1–0)	Meacham (1–2)	–	Jacobs Field	27,749	9–4	W4
14	May 12	@ Orioles	3–2	Martinez (3–0)	Brown (2–1)	Mesa (2)	Oriole Park at Camden Yards	40,516	10–4	W5
15	May 13	@ Orioles	1–6	Mussina (2–1)	Clark (2–1)	–	Oriole Park at Camden Yards	40,185	10–5	L1
16	May 14	@ Orioles	3–1	Hershiser (2–1)	Rhodes (1–2)	Mesa (3)	Oriole Park at Camden Yards	39,167	11–5	W1
17	May 16	@ Yankees	10–5	Nagy (2–0)	Key (1–2)	–	Yankee Stadium	18,246	12–5	W2
–	May 17	@ Yankees	Postponed (rain, makeup August 10)							
18	May 18	@ Red Sox	3–4	Belinda (2–0)	Poole (1–2)	–	Fenway Park	24,285	12–6	L1
19	May 19	@ Red Sox	9–5	Tavarez (1–0)	Ryan (0–1)	–	Fenway Park	23,507	13–6	W1
20	May 20	@ Red Sox	7–5	Plunk (2–0)	Pena (1–1)	Mesa (4)	Fenway Park	29,412	14–6	W2
21	May 21	@ Red Sox	12–10	Assenmacher (1–0)	Pierce (0–2)	Mesa (5)	Fenway Park	32,339	15–6	W3
22	May 22	Brewers	5–7	Bones (3–1)	Nagy (2–1)	Fetters (2)	Jacobs Field	34,464	15–7	L1
23	May 23	Brewers	5–3	Martinez (4–0)	Sparks (1–1)	Mesa (6)	Jacobs Field	35,373	16–7	W1
24	May 24	Brewers	5–7	Rightnowar (1–0)	Clark (2–2)	Fetters (3)	Jacobs Field	29,638	16–8	L1
25	May 26	@ Blue Jays	7–4	Hershiser (3–1)	Hentgen (3–2)	Mesa (7)	Skydome	47,113	17–8	W1
26	May 27	@ Blue Jays	0–3	Leiter (2–2)	Plunk (2–1)	Hall (3)	Skydome	47,143	17–9	L1
27	May 28	@ Blue Jays	5–4	Nagy (3–1)	Darwin (1–4)	Mesa (8)	Skydome	42,365	18–9	W1
28	May 29	White Sox	7–6	Tavarez (2–0)	DeLeon (2–1)	Mesa (9)	Jacobs Field	41,736	19–9	W2
29	May 30	White Sox	2–1	Assenmacher (2–0)	Fernandez (2–4)	Mesa (10)	Jacobs Field	33,038	20–9	W3
30	May 31	White Sox	6–3	Hershiser (4–1)	Abbott (2–2)	Mesa (11)	Jacobs Field	36,771	21–9	W4

June: 20–8 (Home: 12–4, Road: 8–4)

#	Date	Opponent	Score	Win	Loss	Save	Stadium	Attendance	Record	Streak
31	June 1	White Sox	7–4	Black (1–1)	Bere (1–4)	Plunk (1)	Jacobs Field	33,260	22–9	W5
32	June 2	Blue Jays	0–5	Leiter (3–2)	Nagy (3–2)	Timlin (2)	Jacobs Field	41,545	22–10	L1
33	June 3	Blue Jays	3–0	Martinez (5–0)	Darwin (1–5)	–	Jacobs Field	41,566	23–10	W1
34	June 4	Blue Jays	9–8	Tavarez (3–0)	Hall (0–1)	–	Jacobs Field	41,688	24–10	W2
35	June 5	Tigers	8–0	Hershiser (5–1)	Bergman (1–4)	–	Jacobs Field	34,615	25–10	W3
36	June 6	Tigers	4–3	Tavarez (4–0)	Boever (3–3)	Mesa (12)	Jacobs Field	36,115	26–10	W4
37	June 7	Tigers	3–2 (10)	Plunk (3–0)	Maxcy (2–1)	–	Jacobs Field	36,363	27–10	W5
38	June 8	@ Brewers	8–7	Tavarez (5–0)	Lloyd (0–5)	Mesa (13)	County Stadium	17,641	28–10	W6
39	June 9	@ Brewers	7–4	Ogea (1–0)	Roberson (1–2)	Mesa (14)	County Stadium	13,136	29–10	W7
40	June 10	@ Brewers	1–6	Miranda (3–2)	Hershiser (5–2)	Reyes (1)	County Stadium	18,869	29–11	L1
41	June 11	@ Brewers	11–5	Black (2–1)	Scanlan (3–4)	–	County Stadium	18,706	30–11	W1
42	June 12	Orioles	4–3	Nagy (4–2)	Brown (5–4)	Mesa (15)	Jacobs Field	41,845	31–11	W2
43	June 13	Orioles	11–0	Martinez (6–0)	Mussina (5–4)	–	Jacobs Field	41,927	32–11	W3
44	June 14	Orioles	5–2	Ogea (2–0)	Klingenbeck (1–1)	Mesa (16)	Jacobs Field	41,839	33–11	W4
45	June 16	Yankees	2–4	Wickman (2–1)	Poole (1–3)	Wetteland (8)	Jacobs Field	41,643	33–12	L1
46	June 17	Yankees	7–4	Black (3–1)	Pettitte (1–4)	Mesa (17)	Jacobs Field	41,662	34–12	W1
47	June 18	Yankees	5–9	McDowell (3–4)	Nagy (4–3)	Wetteland (9)	Jacobs Field	41,667	34–13	L1
48	June 19	Red Sox	4–3 (10)	Plunk (4–1)	Ryan (0–3)	–	Jacobs Field	41,645	35–13	W1
49	June 20	Red Sox	9–2	Ogea (3–0)	Eshelman (3–1)	–	Jacobs Field	40,190	36–13	W2
50	June 21	Red Sox	1–3	Hanson (7–1)	Hershiser (5–3)	Belinda (3)	Jacobs Field	41,948	36–14	L1
51	June 23	@ White Sox	5–12	Bere (3–6)	Nagy (4–4)	–	Comiskey Park	31,962	36–15	L2
52	June 24	@ White Sox	3–8	Fernandez (3–4)	Black (3–2)	–	Comiskey Park	35,028	36–16	L3
53	June 25	@ White Sox	2–3	DeLeon (3–3)	Assenmacher (2–1)	Radinsky (1)	Comiskey Park	27,514	36–17	L4
54	June 26	@ Royals	2–0	Ogea (4–0)	Gordon (5–3)	Mesa (18)	Kauffman Stadium	24,296	37–17	W1
55	June 27	@ Royals	7–1	Clark (3–2)	Haney (3–2)	–	Kauffman Stadium	19,510	38–17	W2
56	June 28	@ Royals	5–2	Nagy (5–4)	Appier (11–3)	Mesa (19)	Kauffman Stadium	18,596	39–17	W3
57	June 29	@ Twins	10–5	Black (4–2)	Erickson (3–6)	–	Hubert H. Humphrey Metrodome	17,116	40–17	W4
58	June 30	@ Twins	4–1	Martinez (7–0)	Trombley (0–3)	Mesa (20)	Hubert H. Humphrey Metrodome	27,416	41–17	W5

July: 18–9 (Home: 9–4, Road: 9–5)

#	Date	Opponent	Score	Win	Loss	Save	Stadium	Attendance	Record	Streak
59	July 1	@ Twins	5–6	Radke (4–7)	Ogea (4–1)	Aguilera (12)	Hubert H. Humphrey Metrodome	18,820	41–18	L1
60	July 2	@ Twins	7–0	Clark (4–2)	Harris (0–2)	–	Hubert H. Humphrey Metrodome	16,790	42–18	W1
61	July 3	Rangers	9–1	Nagy (6–4)	Rogers (8–4)	–	Jacobs Field	41,713	43–18	W2
62	July 4	Rangers	6–7	McDowell (4–0)	Assenmacher (2–2)	Whiteside (1)	Jacobs Field	41,769	43–19	L1
63	July 5	Rangers	2–0	Martinez (8–0)	Gross (3–8)	Mesa (21)	Jacobs Field	41,881	44–19	W1
64	July 6	Mariners	8–1	Ogea (5–1)	Belcher (4–4)	–	Jacobs Field	41,661	45–19	W2
65	July 7	Mariners	3–5	Johnson (9–1)	Clark (4–3)	–	Jacobs Field	41,741	45–20	L1
66	July 8	Mariners	7–3	Nagy (7–4)	Bosio (6–3)	–	Jacobs Field	41,893	46–20	W1
67	July 9	Mariners	3–9	Torres (3–5)	Hershiser (5–4)	–	Jacobs Field	41,897	46–21	L1
–	July 11	66th All-Star Game	National League vs. American League (The Ballpark in Arlington, Arlington, Texas)							
–	July 13	Athletics	Postponed (rain, makeup July 14)							
68	July 14 (1)	Athletics	1–0	Embree (1–0)	Prieto (0–2)	Mesa (22)	Jacobs Field	N/A	47–21	W1
69	July 14 (2)	Athletics	7–6	Nagy (8–4)	Darling (2–5)	Mesa (23)	Jacobs Field	41,862	48–21	W2
70	July 15	Athletics	7–2	Hershiser (6–4)	Ontiveros (8–4)	Plunk (2)	Jacobs Field	41,726	49–21	W3
71	July 16	Athletics	5–4 (12)	Embree (2–0)	Eckersley (2–3)	–	Jacobs Field	41,767	50–21	W4
72	July 17	Angels	3–8	Anderson (3–2)	Ogea (5–2)	–	Jacobs Field	41,583	50–22	L1
73	July 18	Angels	7–5	Assenmacher (3–2)	Smith (0–3)	–	Jacobs Field	41,763	51–22	W1
74	July 19	@ Rangers	14–5	Nagy (9–4)	Gross (4–9)	–	The Ballpark in Arlington	42,928	52–22	W2
75	July 20	@ Rangers	6–3	Hershiser (7–4)	Brandenburg (0–1)	Mesa (24)	The Ballpark in Arlington	28,160	53–22	W3
76	July 21	@ Athletics	6–1	Martinez (9–0)	Stottlemyre (8–3)	–	Oakland–Alameda County Coliseum	21,158	54–22	W4
77	July 22	@ Athletics	6–4	Tavarez (6–0)	Eckersley (2–4)	Mesa (25)	Oakland–Alameda County Coliseum	33,019	55–22	W5
78	July 23	@ Athletics	2–0	Clark (5–3)	Prieto (1–3)	Mesa (26)	Oakland–Alameda County Coliseum	26,763	56–22	W6
79	July 24	@ Angels	9–7 (10)	Assenmacher (4–2)	Smith (0–4)	Mesa (27)	Anaheim Stadium	30,367	57–22	W7
80	July 25	@ Angels	5–6	Finley (9–7)	Hershiser (7–5)	Smith (23)	Anaheim Stadium	42,268	57–23	L1
81	July 26	@ Angels	3–6	Harkey (5–6)	Martinez (9–1)	Smith (24)	Anaheim Stadium	35,650	57–24	L2
82	July 27	@ Mariners	5–11	Belcher (7–5)	Ogea (5–3)	–	Kingdome	20,121	57–25	L3
83	July 28	@ Mariners	6–5	Plunk (5–1)	Frey (0–4)	Mesa (28)	Kingdome	17,609	58–25	W1
84	July 29	@ Mariners	3–5	Bosio (7–5)	Embree (2–1)	Ayala (16)	Kingdome	43,874	58–26	L1
85	July 30	@ Mariners	5–2	Hershiser (8–5)	Torres (3–8)	Mesa (29)	Kingdome	24,089	59–26	W1

August: 21–9 (Home: 14–3, Road: 7–6)

#	Date	Opponent	Score	Win	Loss	Save	Stadium	Attendance	Record	Streak
86	August 1	Twins	5–6	Mahomes (1–4)	Tavarez (6–1)	Stevens (5)	Jacobs Field	42,023	59–27	L1
87	August 2	Twins	12–6	Clark (6–3)	Harris (0–5)	–	Jacobs Field	41,947	60–27	W1
88	August 3	Twins	6–4	Hill (7–7)	Radke (7–10)	Mesa (30)	Jacobs Field	41,907	61–27	W2
89	August 4	White Sox	13–3	Nagy (10–4)	Bere (5–10)	–	Jacobs Field	41,895	62–27	W3
90	August 5	White Sox	11–7	Hershiser (9–5)	Fernandez (5–8)	–	Jacobs Field	41,657	63–27	W4
91	August 6	White Sox	1–5	Righetti (3–0)	Martinez (9–2)	–	Jacobs Field	41,975	63–28	L1
92	August 8	@ Red Sox	1–5	Wakefield (13–1)	Clark (6–4)	–	Fenway Park	34,574	63–29	L2
93	August 9	@ Red Sox	5–9	Hanson (10–4)	Plunk (5–2)	–	Fenway Park	34,240	63–30	L3
94	August 10 (1)	@ Yankees	10–9	Poole (2–3)	Wetteland (1–2)	Mesa (31)	Yankee Stadium	N/A	64–30	W1
95	August 10 (2)	@ Yankees	5–2	Ogea (6–3)	Hitchcock (5–7)	Mesa (32)	Yankee Stadium	48,115	65–30	W2
96	August 11	@ Yankees	5–4 (11)	Tavarez (7–1)	Wetteland (1–3)	Mesa (33)	Yankee Stadium	33,739	66–30	W3
97	August 12	@ Yankees	2–3	McDowell (10–8)	Martinez (9–3)	–	Yankee Stadium	35,795	66–31	L1
98	August 13	@ Yankees	1–4	Cone (13–6)	Clark (6–5)	–	Yankee Stadium	45,866	66–32	L2
99	August 14	@ Orioles	9–6	Assenmacher (5–2)	Benitez (1–4)	Mesa (34)	Oriole Park at Camden Yards	47,198	67–32	W1
100	August 15	@ Orioles	3–8	Erickson (8–9)	Nagy (10–5)	–	Oriole Park at Camden Yards	46,346	67–33	L1
101	August 16	@ Orioles	8–5	Hershiser (10–5)	Brown (5–8)	Mesa (35)	Oriole Park at Camden Yards	47,140	68–33	W1
102	August 17	Brewers	3–7	McAndrew (1–2)	Martinez (9–4)	Fetters (19)	Jacobs Field	40,505	68–34	L1
103	August 18	Brewers	7–5	Clark (7–5)	Bones (7–9)	Mesa (36)	Jacobs Field	41,752	69–34	W1
104	August 19	Brewers	4–3	Plunk (6–2)	Wegman (5–5)	–	Jacobs Field	41,939	70–34	W2
105	August 20	Brewers	8–5	Tavarez (8–1)	Sparks (7–7)	Mesa (37)	Jacobs Field	41,799	71–34	W3
106	August 21	@ Blue Jays	7–3	Hershiser (11–5)	Hurtado (5–2)	Embree (1)	Skydome	39,187	72–34	W4
107	August 22	@ Blue Jays	4–5	Castillo (1–2)	Tavarez (8–2)	–	Skydome	39,293	72–35	L1
108	August 23	@ Blue Jays	6–5	Poole (3–3)	Carrara (1–3)	Mesa (38)	Skydome	41,169	73–35	W1
109	August 25	Tigers	6–5 (11)	Tavarez (9–2)	Lira (8–9)	–	Jacobs Field	41,676	74–35	W2
110	August 26	Tigers	6–2	Nagy (11–5)	Moore (5–14)	–	Jacobs Field	41,744	75–35	W3
111	August 27	Tigers	9–2	Hershiser (12–5)	Lima (1–6)	–	Jacobs Field	41,616	76–35	W4
112	August 28	Blue Jays	9–1	Ogea (7–3)	Carrara (1–4)	–	Jacobs Field	40,283	77–35	W5
113	August 29	Blue Jays	4–1	Clark (8–5)	Guzman (3–10)	–	Jacobs Field	41,257	78–35	W6
114	August 30	Blue Jays	4–3 (14)	Assenmacher (6–2)	Castillo (1–3)	–	Jacobs Field	41,807	79–35	W7
115	August 31	Blue Jays	6–4 (10)	Mesa (2–0)	Rogers (2–3)	–	Jacobs Field	41,746	80–35	W8

September: 19–9 (Home: 9–4, Road: 10–5)

#	Date	Opponent	Score	Win	Loss	Save	Stadium	Attendance	Record	Streak
116	September 1	@ Tigers	14–4	Nagy (12–5)	Lima (1–7)	–	Tiger Stadium	16,155	81–35	W9
117	September 2	@ Tigers	2–3	Lira (9–9)	Hershiser (12–6)	Doherty (4)	Tiger Stadium	22,426	81–36	L1
118	September 3	@ Tigers	9–8 (10)	Mesa (3–0)	Boever (5–7)	–	Tiger Stadium	25,393	82–36	W1
119	September 4	@ Tigers	2–3	Sodowsky (1–0)	Clark (8–6)	Henry (1)	Tiger Stadium	24,987	82–37	L1
120	September 5	@ Brewers	7–3	Martinez (10–4)	Sparks (7–8)	–	County Stadium	12,129	83–37	W1
121	September 6	@ Brewers	12–2	Hill (8–7)	Givens (5–3)	–	County Stadium	10,042	84–37	W2
122	September 7	Mariners	4–1	Nagy (13–5)	Bosio (9–8)	Mesa (39)	Jacobs Field	41,450	85–37	W3
123	September 8	Orioles	3–2	Hershiser (13–6)	Brown (7–9)	Mesa (40)	Jacobs Field	41,656	86–37	W4
124	September 9	Orioles	2–1	Ogea (8–3)	Krivda (2–4)	Mesa (41)	Jacobs Field	41,729	87–37	W5
125	September 10	Orioles	5–3	Tavarez (10–2)	Orosco (2–4)	Mesa (42)	Jacobs Field	41,647	88–37	W6
126	September 11	Yankees	0–4	McDowell (14–10)	Martinez (10–5)	–	Jacobs Field	41,835	88–38	L1
127	September 12	Yankees	2–9	Kamieniecki (5–5)	Hill (8–8)	–	Jacobs Field	41,276	88–39	L2
128	September 13	Yankees	5–0	Nagy (14–5)	Cone (15–8)	–	Jacobs Field	41,708	89–39	W1
129	September 14	Red Sox	5–3	Hershiser (14–6)	Eshelman (5–3)	Mesa (43)	Jacobs Field	41,812	90–39	W2
130	September 15	Red Sox	3–6	Hanson (14–5)	Embree (2–2)	–	Jacobs Field	41,833	90–40	L1
131	September 16	Red Sox	6–5	Clark (9–6)	Clemens (8–5)	Mesa (44)	Jacobs Field	41,765	91–40	W1
132	September 17	Red Sox	6–9	Suppan (1–2)	Shuey (0–2)	Aguilera (29)	Jacobs Field	41,723	91–41	L1
133	September 18	@ White Sox	11–1	Hill (9–8)	Alvarez (7–10)	–	Comiskey Park	20,439	92–41	W1
134	September 19	@ White Sox	8–2	Nagy (15–5)	Andujar (2–1)	–	Comiskey Park	18,468	93–41	W2
135	September 20	@ White Sox	3–4	Bere (8–13)	Roa (0–1)	Hernandez (31)	Comiskey Park	17,171	93–42	L1
136	September 22	@ Royals	5–3	Hershiser (15–6)	Olson (3–3)	Mesa (45)	Kauffman Stadium	16,562	94–42	W1
137	September 23	@ Royals	7–3	Martinez (11–5)	Gubicza (11–14)	–	Kauffman Stadium	23,816	95–42	W2
138	September 24	@ Royals	2–4	Appier (15–9)	Clark (9–6)	–	Kauffman Stadium	17,277	95–43	L1
139	September 26	@ Twins	4–13	Trombley (4–8)	Nagy (15–6)	–	Hubert H. Humphrey Metrodome	9,825	95–44	L2
140	September 27	@ Twins	9–6	Hill (10–8)	Radke (11–14)	Mesa (46)	Hubert H. Humphrey Metrodome	9,614	96–44	W1
141	September 28	@ Twins	12–4	Martinez (12–5)	Rodriguez (5–8)	–	Hubert H. Humphrey Metrodome	9,442	97–44	W2
142	September 29	Royals	9–2	Hershiser (16–6)	Appier (15–10)	–	Jacobs Field	41,701	98–44	W3
143	September 30	Royals	3–2 (10)	Embree (3–2)	Montgomery (2–3)	–	Jacobs Field	41,578	99–44	W4

October: 1–0 (Home: 1–0)

#	Date	Opponent	Score	Win	Loss	Save	Stadium	Attendance	Record	Streak
144	October 1	Royals	17–7	Nagy (16–6)	Gordon (12–12)	–	Jacobs Field	41,819	100–44	W5

== Player stats ==
= Indicates team leader

= Indicates league leader

=== Batting ===
==== Starters by position ====
Note: Pos = Position; G = Games played; AB = At bats; H = Hits; Avg. = Batting average; HR = Home runs; RBI = Runs batted in

Pos	Player	G	AB	H	Avg.	HR	RBI
C	Tony Peña	91	263	69	.262	5	28
1B	Paul Sorrento	104	323	76	.235	25	79
2B	Carlos Baerga	135	557	175	.314	15	90
3B	Jim Thome	137	452	142	.314	25	73
SS	Omar Vizquel	136	542	144	.266	6	56
LF	Albert Belle	143	546	173	.317	50	126
CF	Kenny Lofton	118	481	149	.310	7	53
RF	Manny Ramirez	137	484	149	.308	31	107
DH	Eddie Murray	113	436	141	.323	21	82

==== Other batters ====
Note: G = Games played; AB = At bats; H = Hits; Avg. = Batting average; HR = Home runs; RBI = Runs batted in

Player	G	AB	H	Avg.	HR	RBI
Sandy Alomar Jr.	66	203	61	.300	10	35
Wayne Kirby	101	188	39	.207	1	14
Herb Perry	52	162	51	.315	3	23
Álvaro Espinoza	66	143	36	.252	2	17
Dave Winfield	46	115	22	.191	2	4
Rubén Amaro Jr.	28	60	12	.200	1	7
Eddie Tucker	17	20	0	.000	0	0
Jesse Levis	12	18	6	.333	0	3
Billy Ripken	8	17	7	.412	2	3
Brian Giles	6	9	5	.556	1	3
Jeromy Burnitz	9	7	4	.571	0	0
David Bell	2	2	0	.000	0	0

=== Pitching ===
==== Starting pitchers ====
Note: G = Games pitched; IP = Innings pitched; W = Wins; L = Losses; ERA = Earned run average; SO = Strikeouts

Player	G	IP	W	L	ERA	SO
Dennis Martinez	28	187.0	12	5	3.08	99
Charles Nagy	29	178.0	16	6	4.55	139
Orel Hershiser	26	167.1	16	6	3.87	111
Mark Clark	22	124.2	9	7	5.27	68
Ken Hill	12	74.2	4	1	3.98	48
Bud Black	11	47.1	4	2	6.85	34
Joe Roa	1	6.0	0	1	6.00	0

==== Other pitchers ====
Note: G = Games pitched; IP = Innings pitched; W = Wins; L = Losses; ERA = Earned run average; SO = Strikeouts

Player	G	IP	W	L	ERA	SO
Chad Ogea	20	106.1	8	3	3.05	57
Jason Grimsley	15	34.0	0	0	6.09	25
Albie Lopez	6	23.0	0	0	3.13	22

==== Relief pitchers ====
Note: G = Games pitched; W = Wins; L = Losses; SV = Saves; ERA = Earned run average; SO = Strikeouts

Player	G	W	L	SV	ERA	SO
José Mesa	62	3	0	46	1.13	58
Julián Tavárez	57	10	2	0	2.44	68
Eric Plunk	56	6	2	2	2.67	71
Paul Assenmacher	47	6	2	0	2.82	40
Jim Poole	42	3	3	0	3.75	41
Alan Embree	23	3	2	1	5.11	23
Dennis Cook	11	0	0	0	6.39	13
Paul Shuey	7	0	2	0	4.26	5
Gregg Olson	3	0	0	0	13.50	0
John Farrell	1	0	0	0	3.86	4

== Postseason ==
=== Cleveland Indians vs. Boston Red Sox ===
Cleveland wins the series, 3–0

Game	Score	Date
1	Boston 4, Cleveland 5	October 3, 1995
2	Boston 0, Cleveland 4	October 4, 1995
3	Cleveland 8, Boston 2	October 6, 1995

==== Game 1, October 3 ====
Jacobs Field, Cleveland, Ohio

Team	1	2	3	4	5	6	7	8	9	10	11	12	13	R	H	E
Boston	0	0	2	0	0	0	0	1	0	0	1	0	0	**4**	**11**	**2**
**Cleveland**	0	0	0	0	0	3	0	0	0	0	1	0	1	**5**	**10**	**2**
WP: Ken Hill (1-0) LP: Zane Smith (0-1); Home runs: BOS: John Valentin (1), Luis Alicea (1), Tim Naehring; CLE: Albert Belle (1), Tony Peña (1)

==== Game 2, October 4 ====
Jacobs Field, Cleveland, Ohio

Team	1	2	3	4	5	6	7	8	9	R	H	E
Boston	0	0	0	0	0	0	0	0	0	**0**	**3**	**1**
**Cleveland**	0	0	0	0	2	0	0	2	X	**4**	**4**	**2**
WP: Orel Hershiser (1-0) LP: Erik Hanson (0-1); Home runs: BOS: None; CLE: Eddie Murray (1)

==== Game 3, October 6 ====
Fenway Park, Boston, Massachusetts

Team	1	2	3	4	5	6	7	8	9	R	H	E
**Cleveland**	0	2	1	0	0	5	0	0	0	**8**	**11**	**2**
Boston	0	0	0	1	0	0	0	1	0	**2**	**7**	**1**
WP: Charles Nagy (1-0) LP: Don Navatsyk (0-1); Home runs: CLE: Jim Thome (1); BOS: None

=== Matchups ===
Game	Score	Date
1	Cleveland 2, **Seattle 3**	October 10, 1995
2	**Cleveland 5**, Seattle 2	October 11, 1995
3	**Seattle 5**, Cleveland 2	October 13, 1995
4	Seattle 0, **Cleveland 7**	October 14, 1995
5	Seattle 2, **Cleveland 3**	October 15, 1995
6	**Cleveland 4**, Seattle 0	October 17, 1995

=== Game 1 ===
October 10: Kingdome, Seattle, Washington

Team	1	2	3	4	5	6	7	8	9	R	H	E
Cleveland	0	0	1	0	0	0	1	0	0	**2**	**10**	**1**
**Seattle**	0	2	0	0	0	0	1	0	X	**3**	**7**	**0**
WP: Bob Wolcott (1-0) LP: Dennis Martínez (0-1) Sv: Norm Charlton (1); Home runs: CLE: Albert Belle (1); SEA: Mike Blowers (1)

=== Game 2 ===
October 11: Kingdome, Seattle, Washington

Team	1	2	3	4	5	6	7	8	9	R	H	E
**Cleveland**	0	0	0	0	2	2	0	1	0	**5**	**12**	**0**
Seattle	0	0	0	0	0	1	0	0	1	**2**	**6**	**1**
WP: Orel Hershiser (1-0) LP: Tim Belcher (0-1); Home runs: CLE: Manny Ramírez (2); SEA: Ken Griffey Jr. (1), Jay Buhner (1)

=== Game 3 ===
October 13: Jacobs Field, Cleveland, Ohio

Team	1	2	3	4	5	6	7	8	9	10	11	R	H	E
**Seattle**	0	1	1	0	0	0	0	0	0	0	3	**5**	**9**	**1**
Cleveland	0	0	0	1	0	0	0	1	0	0	0	**2**	**4**	**2**
WP: Norm Charlton (1-0) LP: Julián Tavárez (0-1); Home runs: SEA: Jay Buhner (2); CLE: None

=== Game 4 ===
October 14: Jacobs Field, Cleveland, Ohio

Team	1	2	3	4	5	6	7	8	9	R	H	E
Seattle	0	0	0	0	0	0	0	0	0	**0**	**6**	**1**
**Cleveland**	3	1	2	0	0	1	0	0	X	**7**	**9**	**0**
WP: Ken Hill (1-0) LP: Andy Benes (0-1); Home runs: SEA: None; CLE: Eddie Murray (1), Jim Thome (1)

=== Game 5 ===
October 15: Jacobs Field, Cleveland, Ohio

Team	1	2	3	4	5	6	7	8	9	R	H	E
Seattle	0	0	1	0	1	0	0	0	0	**2**	**5**	**2**
**Cleveland**	1	0	0	0	0	2	0	0	X	**3**	**10**	**4**
WP: Orel Hershiser (2-0) LP: Chris Bosio (0-1) Sv: José Mesa (1); Home runs: SEA: None; CLE: Jim Thome (1)

=== Game 6 ===
October 17: Kingdome, Seattle, Washington

Team	1	2	3	4	5	6	7	8	9	R	H	E
**Cleveland**	0	0	0	0	1	0	0	3	0	**4**	**8**	**0**
Seattle	0	0	0	0	0	0	0	0	0	**0**	**4**	**1**
WP: Dennis Martínez (1-1) LP: Randy Johnson (0-1); Home runs: CLE: Carlos Baerga (1); Home: None

=== Game 1 ===
October 21, 1995, at Atlanta–Fulton County Stadium in Atlanta

Team	1	2	3	4	5	6	7	8	9	R	H	E
Cleveland	1	0	0	0	0	0	0	0	1	**2**	**2**	**0**
**Atlanta**	0	1	0	0	0	0	2	0	X	**3**	**3**	**2**
WP: Greg Maddux (1-0) LP: Orel Hershiser (0-1); Home runs: Away: None; ATL: Fred McGriff (1)

=== Game 2 ===
October 22, 1995, at Atlanta–Fulton County Stadium in Atlanta

Team	1	2	3	4	5	6	7	8	9	R	H	E
Cleveland	0	2	0	0	0	0	1	0	0	**3**	**6**	**2**
**Atlanta**	0	0	2	0	0	2	0	0	X	**4**	**8**	**2**
WP: Tom Glavine (1-0) LP: Dennis Martínez (0-1) Sv: Mark Wohlers (1); Home runs: CLE: Eddie Murray (1); ATL: Javy López (1)

=== Game 3 ===
October 24, 1995, at Jacobs Field in Cleveland, Ohio

Team	1	2	3	4	5	6	7	8	9	10	11	R	H	E
Atlanta	1	0	0	0	0	1	1	3	0	0	0	**6**	**12**	**1**
**Cleveland**	2	0	2	0	0	0	1	1	0	0	1	**7**	**12**	**2**
WP: José Mesa (1-0) LP: Alejandro Peña (0-1); Home runs: ATL: Fred McGriff (2), Ryan Klesko (1); Home: None

=== Game 4 ===
October 25, 1995, at Jacobs Field in Cleveland, Ohio

Team	1	2	3	4	5	6	7	8	9	R	H	E
**Atlanta**	0	0	0	0	0	1	3	0	1	**5**	**11**	**1**
Cleveland	0	0	0	0	0	1	0	0	1	**2**	**6**	**0**
WP: Steve Avery (1-0) LP: Ken Hill (0-1) Sv: Pedro Borbón Jr. (1); Home runs: ATL: Ryan Klesko (2); CLE: Albert Belle (1), Manny Ramírez (1)

=== Game 5 ===
October 26, 1995, at Jacobs Field in Cleveland, Ohio

Team	1	2	3	4	5	6	7	8	9	R	H	E
Atlanta	0	0	0	1	1	0	0	0	2	**4**	**7**	**0**
**Cleveland**	2	0	0	0	0	2	0	1	X	**5**	**8**	**1**
WP: Orel Hershiser (1-1) LP: Greg Maddux (1-1) Sv: José Mesa (1); Home runs: ATL: Luis Polonia (1), Ryan Klesko (3); CLE: Albert Belle (2), Jim Thome (1)

=== Game 6 ===
October 28, 1995, at Atlanta–Fulton County Stadium in Atlanta

Team	1	2	3	4	5	6	7	8	9	R	H	E
Cleveland	0	0	0	0	0	0	0	0	0	**0**	**1**	**1**
**Atlanta**	0	0	0	0	0	1	0	0	X	**1**	**6**	**0**
WP: Tom Glavine (2-0) LP: Jim Poole (0-1) Sv: Mark Wohlers (2); Home runs: Away: None; ATL: David Justice (1)

=== Game log ===
1995 Postseason Game Log
American League Division Series

#	Date	Opponent	Score	Win	Loss	Save	Stadium	Attendance	Record	Recap

American League Championship Series

#	Date	Opponent	Score	Win	Loss	Save	Stadium	Attendance	Record	Recap

World Series vs. Atlanta Braves – Braves win series 4–2

#	Date	Opponent	Score	Win	Loss	Save	Stadium	Attendance	Record	Recap
1	October 21	@ Braves	2–3	Maddux (1–0)	**Hershiser** (0–1)		Atlanta–Fulton County Stadium	51,876	0–1	L1
2	October 22	@ Braves	3–4	Glavine (1–0)	**Martínez** (0–1)	Wohlers (1)	Atlanta–Fulton County Stadium	51,877	0–2	L2
3	October 24	Braves	7–6 (11)	**Mesa** (1–0)	Peña (0–1)		**Jacobs Field**	43,584	1–2	W1
4	October 25	Braves	2–5	Avery (1–0)	**Hill** (0–1)	Borbón Jr. (1)	**Jacobs Field**	43,578	1–3	L1
5	October 26	Braves	5–4	**Hershiser** (1–1)	Maddux (1–1)	**Mesa** (1)	**Jacobs Field**	43,595	2–3	W1
6	October 28	@ Braves	0–1	Glavine (2–0)	**Poole** (0–1)	Wohlers (2)	Atlanta–Fulton County Stadium	51,875	2–4	L1

Legend: = Win = Loss = Postponement
Bold = Indians team member

== Award winners ==
Hershiser became the Most Valuable Player of the 1995 American League Championship Series against the Seattle Mariners, and he is the only player to win the League Championship series Most Valuable Player Award in both leagues.

All-Star Game

- Carlos Baerga, second base, starter
- Albert Belle, outfield, starter
- Kenny Lofton, outfield, starter
- Dennis Martínez, pitcher, reserve
- José Mesa, relief pitcher, reserve
- Manny Ramírez, outfield, reserve

== Minor league affiliates ==
Classification level	Team	League	Season article
AAA	Buffalo Bisons	International League	1995 Buffalo Bisons season
AA	Canton–Akron Indians	Eastern League	1995 Canton–Akron Indians season
Advanced A	Kinston Indians	Carolina League	
A	Columbus RedStixx	South Atlantic League	
Short Season A	Watertown Indians	New York–Penn League	
Rookie	Burlington Indians	Appalachian League	
