= 1995 Texas Rangers season =

1995 Texas Rangers
- League: American League
- Division: West
- Ballpark: The Ballpark in Arlington
- City: Arlington, Texas
- Record: 74–70 (.514)
- Divisional place: 3rd
- Owners: George W. Bush
- General managers: Doug Melvin
- Managers: Johnny Oates
- Television: KTVT (Jim Sundberg, Steve Busby); Prime Sports Southwest (Mark Holtz, Tom Grieve, Norm Hitzges)
- Radio: KRLD (Eric Nadel, Brad Sham ) KXEB (Luis Mayoral, Mario Díaz Oroszo)

The 1995 Texas Rangers season was the 35th of the Texas Rangers franchise overall, their 24th in Arlington as the Rangers, and their 2nd season at The Ballpark in Arlington. The Rangers finished third in the American League West with a record of 74 wins and 70 losses. They also hosted the 1995 Major League Baseball All-Star Game.

== Offseason ==
- October 14, 1994: Rob Ducey was purchased by the Nippon Ham Fighters (Japan Pacific) from the Texas Rangers.
- December 9, 1994: José Canseco was traded by the Rangers to the Boston Red Sox for Otis Nixon and Luis Ortiz.
- January 26, 1995: Rick Schu was signed as a free agent by the Rangers.

== Regular season ==
=== Season standings ===
AL West
Team	W	L	Pct.	GB	Home	Road
Seattle Mariners	79	66	.545	—	46‍–‍27	33‍–‍39
California Angels	78	67	.538	1	39‍–‍33	39‍–‍34
Texas Rangers	74	70	.514	4½	41‍–‍31	33‍–‍39
Oakland Athletics	67	77	.465	11½	38‍–‍34	29‍–‍43

=== Record vs. opponents ===
1995 American League record Source: MLB Standings Grid – 1995
Team	BAL	BOS	CAL	CWS	CLE	DET	KC	MIL	MIN	NYY	OAK	SEA	TEX	TOR
Baltimore	—	4–9	9–4	6–1	2–10	8–5	4–5	7–5	3–6	6–7	5–7	6–7	4–1	7–6
Boston	9–4	—	11–3	5–3	6–7	8–5	3–2	8–4	5–4	5–8	8–4	7–5	3–4	8–5
California	4–9	3–11	—	10–2	3–2	6–2	5–7	5–2	8–5	7–5	6–7	7–6	6–7	8–2
Chicago	1–6	3–5	2–10	—	5–8	8–4	8–5	6–7	10–3	3–2–1	7–5	4–9	5–7	6–5
Cleveland	10–2	7–6	2–3	8–5	—	10–3	11–1	9–4	9–4	6–6	7–0	5–4	6–3	10–3
Detroit	5–8	5–8	2–6	4–8	3–10	—	3–4	8–5	7–5	5–8	2–3	5–5	4–8	7–6
Kansas City	5–4	2–3	7–5	5–8	1–11	4–3	—	10–2	6–7	3–7	5–8	7–5	8–6	7–5
Milwaukee	5–7	4–8	2–5	7–6	4–9	5–8	2–10	—	9–4	5–6	7–2	3–2	5–7	7–5
Minnesota	6–3	4–5	5–8	3–10	4–9	5–7	7–6	4–9	—	3–4	5–7	4–8	5–8	1–4
New York	7–6	8–5	5–7	2–3–1	6–6	8–5	7–3	6–5	4–3	—	4–9	4–9	6–3	12–1
Oakland	7–5	4–8	7–6	5–7	0–7	3–2	8–5	2–7	7–5	9–4	—	7–6	5–8	3–7
Seattle	7–6	5–7	6–7	9–4	4–5	5–5	5–7	2–3	8–4	9–4	6–7	—	10–3	3–4
Texas	1–4	4–3	7–6	7–5	3–6	8–4	6–8	7–5	8–5	3–6	8–5	3–10	—	9–3
Toronto	6–7	5–8	2–8	5–6	3–10	6–7	5–7	5–7	4–1	1–12	7–3	4–3	3–9	—

=== Notable transactions ===
- April 13, 1995: Mickey Tettleton was signed as a free agent by the Rangers.
- May 16, 1995: John Dettmer was traded by the Rangers to the Baltimore Orioles for Jack Voigt.
- July 20, 1995: Sam Horn was signed as a free agent by the Rangers.
- July 31, 1995: Danny Darwin was signed as a free agent by the Rangers.
- August 31, 1995: Jack Voigt was traded by the Rangers to the Boston Red Sox for Chris Howard.

=== All-Star Game ===
The 1995 Major League Baseball All-Star Game was the 66th playing of the midsummer classic between the all-stars of the American League (AL) and National League (NL), the two leagues comprising Major League Baseball. The game was held on July 11, 1995, at The Ballpark in Arlington in Arlington, Texas, the home of the Texas Rangers of the American League. The game resulted in the National League defeating the American League 3-2.

=== Roster ===
1995 Texas Rangers
Roster
Pitchers: 48 José Alberro; 51 Mark Brandenburg; 38 Terry Burrows; 42 Dennis Cook; 44 Danny Darwin; 21 John Dettmer; 30 Héctor Fajardo; 46 Kevin Gross; 32 Rick Helling; 55 Wilson Heredia; 41 Chris Howard; 31 Roger McDowell; 54 Chris Nichting; 28 Darren Oliver; 59 Roger Pavlik; 37 Kenny Rogers; 40 Jeff Russell; 57 Scott Taylor; 39 Bob Tewksbury; 52 Ed Vosberg; 27 Matt Whiteside; 36 Bobby Witt	Catchers: 14 John Marzano; 7 Iván Rodríguez; 10 Dave Valle; Infielders: 6 Esteban Beltré; 22 Steve Buechele; 22 Will Clark; 1 Jeff Frye; 23 Benji Gil; 30 Sam Horn; 9 Luis Ortiz; 13 Mike Pagliarulo; 16 Dean Palmer; 24 Craig Worthington	Outfielders: 18 Eric Fox; 4 Lou Frazier; 19 Juan González; 29 Rusty Greer; 45 Shawn Hare; 14 Billy Hatcher; 21 Candy Maldonado; 3 Mark McLemore; 2 Otis Nixon; 15 Mickey Tettleton; 21 Jack Voigt	Manager: 26 Johnny Oates; Coaches: 17 Dick Bosman (Pitching); 20 Bucky Dent (Bench); 25 Larry Hardy (Bullpen); 8 Rudy Jaramillo (Hitting); 12 Ed Napoleon (First base); 5 Jerry Narron (Third base)

== Player stats ==
= Indicates team leader

=== Batting ===
==== Starters by position ====
Note: Pos = Position; G = Games played; AB = At bats; H = Hits; Avg. = Batting average; HR = Home runs; RBI = Runs batted in

Pos	Player	G	AB	H	Avg.	HR	RBI
C	Iván Rodríguez	130	492	149	.303	12	67
1B	Will Clark	123	454	137	.302	16	92
2B	Jeff Frye	90	313	87	.278	4	29
SS	Benji Gil	130	415	91	.219	9	46
3B	Mike Pagliarulo	86	241	56	.232	4	27
LF	Mark McLemore	129	467	122	.261	5	41
CF	Otis Nixon	139	589	174	.295	0	45
RF	Rusty Greer	131	417	113	.271	13	61
DH	Juan González	90	352	104	.295	27	82

==== Other batters ====
Note: G = Games played; AB = At bats; H = Hits; Avg. = Batting average; HR = Home runs; RBI = Runs batted in

Player	G	AB	H	Avg.	HR	RBI
Mickey Tettleton	134	429	102	.238	32	78
Dean Palmer	36	119	40	.336	9	24
Luis Ortiz	41	108	25	.231	1	18
Lou Frazier	49	99	21	.212	0	8
Esteban Beltré	54	92	20	.217	0	7
Dave Valle	36	75	18	.240	0	5
Craig Worthington	26	68	15	.221	2	6
Jack Voigt	33	62	10	.161	2	8
Candy Maldonado	13	30	7	.233	2	5
Shawn Hare	18	24	6	.250	0	2
Steve Buechele	9	24	3	.125	0	0
Eric Fox	10	15	0	.000	0	0
Billy Hatcher	6	12	1	.083	0	0
Sam Horn	11	9	1	.111	0	0
John Marzano	2	6	2	.333	0	0

=== Pitching ===
==== Starting pitchers ====
Note: G = Games pitched; IP = Innings pitched; W = Wins; L = Losses; ERA = Earned run average; SO = Strikeouts

Player	G	IP	W	L	ERA	SO
Kenny Rogers	31	208.0	17	7	3.38	140
Roger Pavlik	31	191.2	10	10	4.37	149
Kevin Gross	31	183.2	9	15	5.54	106
Bob Tewksbury	21	129.2	8	7	4.58	53
Bobby Witt	10	61.1	3	4	4.55	46
Scott Taylor	3	15.1	1	2	9.39	10
Rick Helling	3	12.1	0	2	6.57	5

==== Other pitchers ====
Note: G = Games pitched; IP = Innings pitched; W = Wins; L = Losses; ERA = Earned run average; SO = Strikeouts

Player	G	IP	W	L	ERA	SO
Darren Oliver	17	49.0	4	2	4.22	39
Danny Darwin	7	34.0	2	2	7.15	22

==== Relief pitchers ====
Note: G = Games pitched; W = Wins; L = Losses; SV = Saves; ERA = Earned run average; SO = Strikeouts

Player	G	W	L	SV	ERA	SO
Jeff Russell	37	1	0	20	3.03	21
Roger McDowell	64	7	4	4	4.02	49
Ed Vosberg	44	5	5	4	3.00	36
Matt Whiteside	40	5	4	3	4.08	46
Dennis Cook	35	0	2	2	4.00	40
Terry Burrows	28	2	2	1	6.45	22
Chris Nichting	13	0	0	0	7.03	6
José Alberro	12	0	0	0	7.40	10
Mark Brandenburg	11	0	1	0	5.93	21
Wilson Heredia	6	0	1	0	3.75	6
Héctor Fajardo	5	0	0	0	7.80	9
Chris Howard	4	0	0	0	0.00	2
John Dettmer	1	0	0	0	27.00	0

== Awards and honors ==
- Iván Rodríguez, C, Gold Glove
- Iván Rodríguez, Silver Slugger Award

All-Star Game

- Iván Rodríguez, C, Starter
- Kenny Rogers, P, Reserve

== Farm system ==
Level	Team	League	Manager
AAA	Oklahoma City 89ers	American Association	Greg Biagini
AA	Tulsa Drillers	Texas League	Bobby Jones
A	Charlotte Rangers	Florida State League	Butch Wynegar
A	Charleston RiverDogs	South Atlantic League	Mike Berger
A-Short Season	Hudson Valley Renegades	New York–Penn League	Bump Wills
Rookie	GCL Rangers	Gulf Coast League	Chino Cadahia
