= 1995 Baltimore Orioles season =

Major League Baseball season

1995 Baltimore Orioles
- League: American League
- Division: East
- Ballpark: Oriole Park at Camden Yards
- City: Baltimore, Maryland
- Record: 71–73 (.493)
- Divisional place: 3rd
- Owners: Peter Angelos
- General managers: Roland Hemond
- Managers: Phil Regan
- Television: WJZ-TV/WNUV/WBDC; Home Team Sports (Mel Proctor, Josh Lewin, John Lowenstein, Jim Palmer)
- Radio: WBAL/WTEM (Chuck Thompson, Jon Miller, Fred Manfra)

The 1995 Baltimore Orioles season was the 95th season in Baltimore Orioles franchise history, the 42nd in Baltimore, and the 4th at Oriole Park at Camden Yards. It involved the Orioles finishing third in the American League East with a record of 71 wins and 73 losses.

== Offseason ==
- November 18, 1994: Mark Lee was signed as a free agent by the Orioles.
- December 6, 1994: Jay Powell was traded by the Orioles to the Florida Marlins for Bret Barberie.

== Regular season ==
The Orioles scored 704 runs (4.89 per game) and allowed only 640 runs (4.44 per game), second only to the Cleveland Indians. The Orioles pitching staff also allowed the fewest hits in the Majors (1,165), the most complete games (19) and the most shutouts in the AL (10).

=== Cal Ripken breaks Lou Gehrig's record ===
On Wednesday, September 6, 1995, many baseball fans within and out of the United States tuned into cable TV network ESPN (and called by Chris Berman and Buck Martinez) to watch Ripken surpass Lou Gehrig's 56-year-old record for consecutive games played. The game, between the Orioles and the California Angels, still ranks as one of the network's most watched baseball games. Cal's children, Rachel and Ryan, threw out the ceremonial first balls.

Both President Bill Clinton and Vice-president Al Gore were at the game. President Clinton was in the WBAL local radio broadcast booth when Ripken hit a home run in the fourth inning, and called the home run over the air. When the game became official after the Angels' half of the fifth inning, the numerical banners that displayed Ripken's streak on the wall of the Baltimore & Ohio Warehouse at Camden Yards outside the stadium's right field wall changed from 2130 to 2131.

Everyone attending (including the opposing Angels and all four umpires) erupted with a standing ovation lasting more than 22 minutes, one of the longest standing ovations for any athlete; ESPN did not go to a commercial break during the entire ovation. During the ovation, Cal was convinced by his teammates to take an impromptu victory lap around the entire Camden Yards to shake hands and give high-fives to the fans, creating a highlight reel moment that's been played repeatedly over the years since then.

=== Season standings ===
AL East
Team	W	L	Pct.	GB	Home	Road
Boston Red Sox	86	58	.597	—	42‍–‍30	44‍–‍28
New York Yankees	79	65	.549	7	46‍–‍26	33‍–‍39
Baltimore Orioles	71	73	.493	15	36‍–‍36	35‍–‍37
Detroit Tigers	60	84	.417	26	35‍–‍37	25‍–‍47
Toronto Blue Jays	56	88	.389	30	29‍–‍43	27‍–‍45

=== Record vs. opponents ===
1995 American League record Source: MLB Standings Grid – 1995
Team	BAL	BOS	CAL	CWS	CLE	DET	KC	MIL	MIN	NYY	OAK	SEA	TEX	TOR
Baltimore	—	4–9	9–4	6–1	2–10	8–5	4–5	7–5	3–6	6–7	5–7	6–7	4–1	7–6
Boston	9–4	—	11–3	5–3	6–7	8–5	3–2	8–4	5–4	5–8	8–4	7–5	3–4	8–5
California	4–9	3–11	—	10–2	3–2	6–2	5–7	5–2	8–5	7–5	6–7	7–6	6–7	8–2
Chicago	1–6	3–5	2–10	—	5–8	8–4	8–5	6–7	10–3	3–2–1	7–5	4–9	5–7	6–5
Cleveland	10–2	7–6	2–3	8–5	—	10–3	11–1	9–4	9–4	6–6	7–0	5–4	6–3	10–3
Detroit	5–8	5–8	2–6	4–8	3–10	—	3–4	8–5	7–5	5–8	2–3	5–5	4–8	7–6
Kansas City	5–4	2–3	7–5	5–8	1–11	4–3	—	10–2	6–7	3–7	5–8	7–5	8–6	7–5
Milwaukee	5–7	4–8	2–5	7–6	4–9	5–8	2–10	—	9–4	5–6	7–2	3–2	5–7	7–5
Minnesota	6–3	4–5	5–8	3–10	4–9	5–7	7–6	4–9	—	3–4	5–7	4–8	5–8	1–4
New York	7–6	8–5	5–7	2–3–1	6–6	8–5	7–3	6–5	4–3	—	4–9	4–9	6–3	12–1
Oakland	7–5	4–8	7–6	5–7	0–7	3–2	8–5	2–7	7–5	9–4	—	7–6	5–8	3–7
Seattle	7–6	5–7	6–7	9–4	4–5	5–5	5–7	2–3	8–4	9–4	6–7	—	10–3	3–4
Texas	1–4	4–3	7–6	7–5	3–6	8–4	6–8	7–5	8–5	3–6	8–5	3–10	—	9–3
Toronto	6–7	5–8	2–8	5–6	3–10	6–7	5–7	5–7	4–1	1–12	7–3	4–3	3–9	—

=== Notable transactions ===
- April 9, 1995: Jesse Orosco was signed as a free agent by the Orioles.
- April 21, 1995: Andy Van Slyke was signed as a free agent by the Orioles.
- May 16, 1995: Jack Voigt was traded by the Orioles to the Texas Rangers for John Dettmer.
- June 14, 1995: Jarvis Brown was sent to the Orioles by the Cincinnati Reds as part of a conditional deal.
- June 18, 1995: Andy Van Slyke was traded by the Orioles to the Philadelphia Phillies for Gene Harris.
- July 28, 1995: Damon Buford and Alex Ochoa were traded by the Orioles to the New York Mets for Bobby Bonilla and a player to be named later. The Mets completed the deal by sending Jimmy Williams (minors) to the Orioles on August 16.

=== Roster ===
1995 Baltimore Orioles
Roster
Pitchers: 49 Armando Benítez; 77 Joe Borowski; 41 Kevin Brown; 36 Terry Clark; 55 Jim Dedrick; 45 John DeSilva; 21 Scott Erickson; 50 Sid Fernandez; 29 Gene Harris; 39 Mike Hartley; 60 Jimmy Haynes; 31 Doug Jones; 55 Scott Klingenbeck; 37 Rick Krivda; 52 Mark Lee; 19 Ben McDonald; 75 Alan Mills; 51 Jamie Moyer; 35 Mike Mussina; 56 Mike Oquist; 47 Jesse Orosco; 29 Brad Pennington; 53 Arthur Rhodes	Catchers: 59 César Devarez; 23 Chris Hoiles; 24 Matt Nokes; 24,48 Gregg Zaun; Infielders: 6 Manny Alexander; 2 Bret Barberie; 10 Leo Gómez; 30 Jeff Huson; 12 Jeff Manto; 25 Rafael Palmeiro; 8 Cal Ripken Jr.; 28 Jack Voigt	Outfielders: 9 Brady Anderson; 17 Kevin Bass; 26 Bobby Bonilla; 32 Jarvis Brown; 26 Damon Buford; 28 Curtis Goodwin; 11 Jeffrey Hammonds; 42 Sherman Obando; 34 Mark Smith; 18 Andy Van Slyke; Other batters: 3 Harold Baines	Manager: 27 Phil Regan; Coaches: 43 Steve Boros (Third Base); 1 Al Bumbry (First Base); 15 Chuck Cottier (Bench); 46 Mike Flanagan (Pitching); 44 Elrod Hendricks (Bullpen); 14 Lee May (Hitting)

== Player stats ==
= Indicates team leader

=== Batting ===
==== Starters by position ====
Note: Pos = Position; G = Games played; AB = At bats; H = Hits; Avg. = Batting average; HR = Home runs; RBI = Runs batted in

Pos	Player	G	AB	H	Avg.	HR	RBI
C	Chris Hoiles	114	352	88	.250	19	58
1B	Rafael Palmeiro	143	554	172	.310	39	104
2B	Manny Alexander	94	242	57	.236	3	23
SS	Cal Ripken Jr.	144	550	144	.262	17	88
3B	Jeff Manto	89	254	65	.256	17	38
LF	Brady Anderson	143	554	145	.262	16	64
CF	Curtis Goodwin	87	289	76	.263	1	24
RF	Jeffrey Hammonds	57	178	43	.242	4	23
DH	Harold Baines	127	385	115	.299	24	63

==== Other batters ====
Note: G = Games played; AB = At bats; H = Hits; Avg. = Batting average; HR = Home runs; RBI = Runs batted in

Player	G	AB	H	Avg.	HR	RBI
Kevin Bass	111	295	72	.244	5	32
Bret Barberie	90	237	57	.241	2	25
Bobby Bonilla	61	237	79	.333	10	46
Jeff Huson	66	161	40	.248	1	19
Leo Gómez	53	127	30	.236	4	12
Gregg Zaun	40	104	27	.260	3	14
Mark Smith	37	104	24	.231	3	15
Andy Van Slyke	17	63	10	.159	3	8
Matt Nokes	26	49	6	.122	2	6
Sherman Obando	16	38	10	.263	0	3
Damon Buford	24	32	2	.063	0	2
Jarvis Brown	18	27	4	.148	0	1
Cesar Devarez	6	4	0	.000	0	0
Jack Voigt	3	1	1	1.000	0	0

=== Pitching ===
= Indicates league leader

==== Starting pitchers ====
Note: G = Games pitched; IP = Innings pitched; W = Wins; L = Losses; ERA = Earned run average; SO = Strikeouts

Player	G	IP	W	L	ERA	SO
Mike Mussina	32	221.2	19	9	3.29	158
Kevin Brown	26	172.1	10	9	3.60	117
Scott Erickson	17	108.2	9	4	3.89	61
Ben McDonald	14	80.0	3	6	4.16	62
Rick Krivda	13	75.1	2	7	4.54	53
Scott Klingenbeck	6	31.1	2	2	4.88	15
Jimmy Haynes	4	24.0	2	1	2.25	22
John DeSilva	2	8.2	1	0	7.27	1

==== Other pitchers ====
Note: G = Games pitched; IP = Innings pitched; W = Wins; L = Losses; ERA = Earned run average; SO = Strikeouts

Player	G	IP	W	L	ERA	SO
Jamie Moyer	27	115.2	8	6	5.21	65
Arthur Rhodes	19	75.1	2	5	6.21	77
Sid Fernandez	8	28.0	0	4	7.39	31

==== Relief pitchers ====
Note: G = Games pitched; W = Wins; L = Losses; SV = Saves; ERA = Earned run average; SO = Strikeouts

Player	G	W	L	SV	ERA	SO
Doug Jones	52	0	4	22	5.01	42
Jesse Orosco	65	2	4	3	3.26	58
Armando Benítez	44	1	5	2	5.66	56
Mark Lee	39	2	0	1	4.86	27
Terry Clark	38	2	5	1	3.46	18
Mike Oquist	27	2	1	0	4.17	27
Alan Mills	21	3	0	0	7.43	16
Brad Pennington	8	0	1	0	8.10	10
Jim Dedrick	6	0	0	0	2.35	10
Joe Borowski	6	0	0	0	1.23	3
Mike Hartley	3	1	0	0	1.29	4
Gene Harris	3	0	0	0	4.50	4

== Awards and honors ==
- Cal Ripken Jr., Associated Press Athlete of the Year
- Cal Ripken Jr., Sports Illustrated Sportsman of the Year

== Farm system ==
Level	Team	League	Manager
AAA	Rochester Red Wings	International League	Marv Foley
AA	Bowie Baysox	Eastern League	Bob Miscik
A	High Desert Mavericks	California League	Tim Blackwell
A	Frederick Keys	Carolina League	Mike O'Berry
Rookie	Bluefield Orioles	Appalachian League	Andy Etchebarren
Rookie	GCL Orioles	Gulf Coast League	Julio Garcia
