= Petroleros de Cabimas =

The Petroleros de Cabimas was a baseball club that played from 1991 through 1995 in the Venezuelan Professional Baseball League. The Petroleros joined the league as an expansion team in the Western Division and played its home games at Estadio Víctor Davalillo in Cabimas, a town on the shore of Maracaibo Lake in Zulia State.

The Petroleros performed poorly during their four seasons in the league, always ending last in the four-team Western Division, and never reached the playoffs.

The Cabimas team withdrew after the 1994–95 season due to its bad performance, the poor attendance and the few support it received, and was replaced by the Pastora de Occidente in the 1995–1996 tournament.

== Yearly team records ==
Season	Record	Finish	Manager
1991-92	26-34	4th	José Martínez
1992-93	17-42	4th	José Martínez; Luis Aparicio
1993-94	21-39	4th	Luis Aparicio
1994-95	22-38	4th	Duffy Dyer; Bob Humphreys

== All-time roster ==
- Paul Abbott
- Andy Ashby
- Cliff Brantley
- Jim Bullinger
- Terry Burrows
- Steve Carter
- Jeff Cirillo
- Jamie Dismuke
- Angel Escobar
- Joe Hall
- Jonathan Hurst
- John Johnstone
- Jimmy Kremers
- Ced Landrum
- Danilo León
- Jamie McAndrew
- Robert Machado
- Quinn Mack
- John Massarelli
- Scott May
- Matt Maysey
- Lipso Nava
- Tomás Pérez
- Len Picota
- Fernando Ramsey
- Laddie Renfroe
- Argenis Salazar
- Bob Sebra
- Gary Scott
- Steve Sparks
- Kelly Stinnett
- Scott Taylor
- George Tsamis
- Tim Unroe
- Eduardo Zambrano

== Sources ==
- Gutiérrez, Daniel; Alvarez, Efraim; Gutiérrez (h), Daniel (2006). La Enciclopedia del Béisbol en Venezuela. LVBP, Caracas. ISBN 980-6996-02-X
- Gutiérrez, Daniel; González, Javier (1992). Numeritos del béisbol profesional venezolano (1946-1992). LVBP, Caracas. ISBN 980-0712-47-X
