= Regional Brewery =

Cervecería Regional C.A
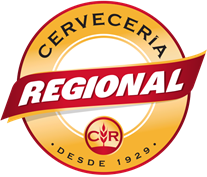

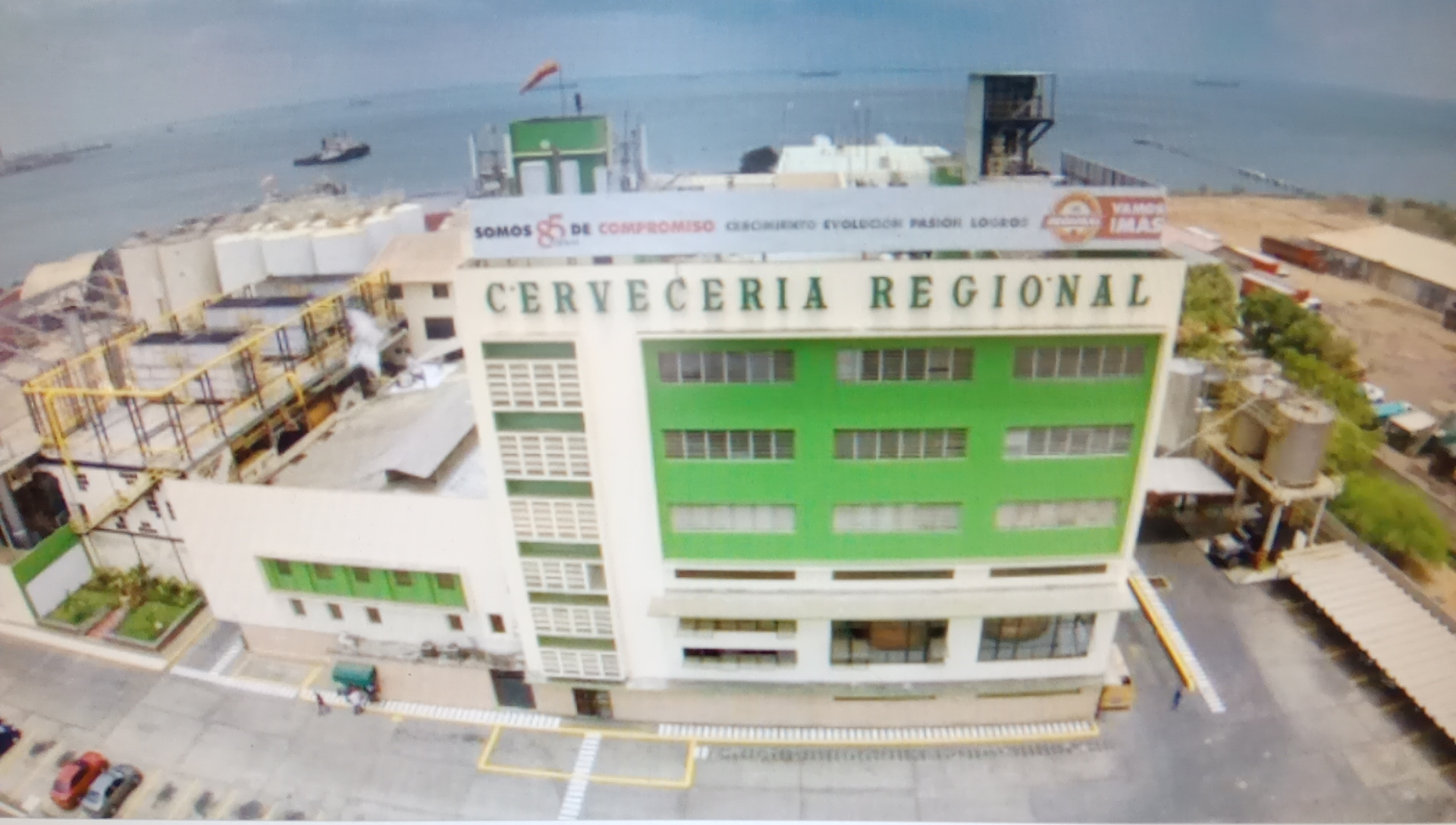
- Founded: May 14, 1929
- Type: Anonymous company
- Headquarters: Maracaibo, Zulia, Venezuela
- Products: Beer, malt beverages
- Owner: Cisneros Group (1992-present)
- Website: cerveceriaregional.com

Cervecería Regional C.A. is a Venezuelan brewery responsible for producing beer and malt-based beverages, founded on 14 May 1929, with its main headquarters in Maracaibo, Zulia, Venezuela. It is considered the oldest and most traditional brewery in Venezuela.

Until 1997 the company sponsored the baseball teams Aguilas del Zulia and Petroleros de Cabimas (later Pastora de Occidente). From 2013 it became sponsor of Tiburones de La Guaira, Leones del Caracas and Tigres de Aragua (until 2017).

== History ==
On 14 May 1929, the Compania Anonima Cerveceria Regional was founded in Maracaibo by a group of young entrepreneurs who had been working toward the project since 1927. The company was initially formed by 41 shareholders, among individuals and commercial firms, the main ones being Felipe Amado, Amilcar Morales, Martinez & Atencio and Emiro A. Perez & Co. At the time, company statutes required shareholders to own establishments in Zulia that sold beer, guaranteeing product distribution from the outset.

The first president was Felipe Amado and the vice-president was Amilcar Morales. The plant was built on the shores of Lake Maracaibo using German equipment and machinery, and its activity initially concentrated on the western states of the country. Its location was strategic, facilitating the supply of raw materials from Europe and the dispatch of products by sea, lake or river. The founding brewmaster, brought from Germany, was Franz Budell, known popularly as Don Pancho.

The company started with a capital of two million bolivares and a production capacity of 3 million litres per year, launching three new beverages under the Regional brand: beer, malt drink and nutrimalt. The quality of its beer earned a Gold Medal at the 1937 International Exposition, making it the only Venezuelan brewery to hold that distinction.

In 1990 the company opened a wastewater treatment plant and launched a returnable bottle with a twist cap. In 1992, the Cisneros Group acquired Cerveceria Regional and gave it a new boost by making a major investment to expand the market into Anzoategui, Aragua, Barinas, Bolivar, Carabobo, Cojedes, the Capital District, Guarico, Lara, Miranda and Nueva Esparta.

In November 1994 the company agreed an alliance with Canadian company Labatt, and in 1997 inaugurated its second plant in Cagua, Aragua State, with eight production lines for malt and all beer brands. By 1997 the company held 7.7% of the national market, with production of 101 to 131 million litres per year.

In November 2000, Regional Light was launched, the first pale lager sold in a transparent bottle in Venezuela, which quickly became the most popular beer in the country. In November 2002, the magazine Poder, together with Booz Allen & Hamilton and Egon Zhender International, awarded the company the Latin American Business Awards as the fastest-growing company with the greatest projection in Venezuela.

In 2010, Brazilian company AmBev and Cerveceria Regional announced an integration of their Venezuelan operations, with Regional holding an 85% stake in the new company and AmBev retaining 15%. In 2012 Regional acquired the production and distribution rights of Cerveza Zulia, originally launched by AmBev Venezuela in 2008.

Between 2015 and 2017 the company suffered supply problems with barley due to the Venezuelan economic crisis. In 2016 the company was led by Andres Cisneros.

Today Cerveceria Regional is the brewery with the greatest tradition in Venezuela, with an installed production capacity of 47 million litres of beer per month. Its brands are exported to Curacao, Spain (Valencia), Portugal, the Dominican Republic, Chile and Peru.

== Products ==
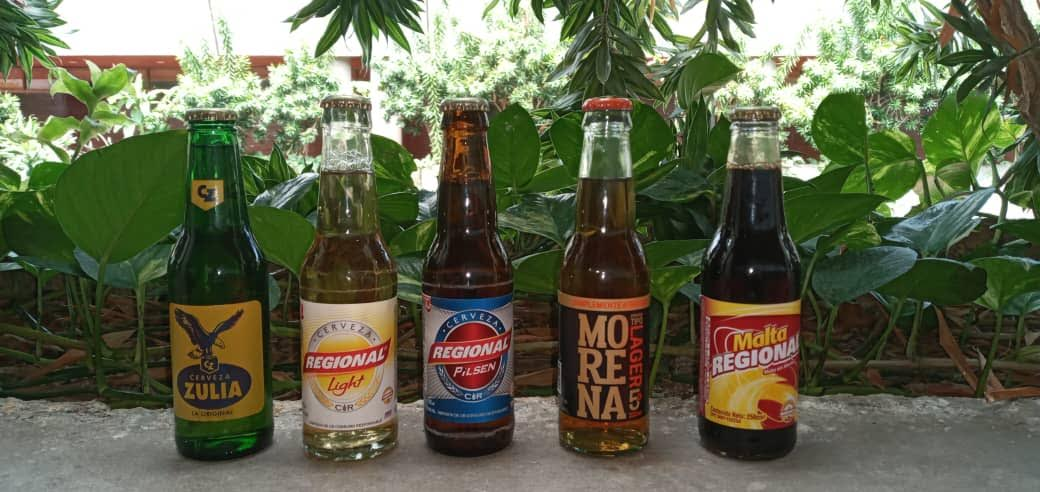
Cervecería Regional products in bottle presentation

- Cerveza Zulia: 4.5% alcohol, green bottle, Pilsen type. Originally belonging to Cervecera Nacional until 1982. Relaunched by AmBev Venezuela in 2008, and acquired by Regional in 2012.
- Regional Light: 3.5% alcohol, transparent bottle. The lightest beer in the range.
- Regional Pilsen: 5% alcohol, amber bottle. Fuller and more intense flavour.
- Malta Regional: non-alcoholic malt beverage, transparent bottle.
- Cerveza Morena: 5% alcohol, transparent bottle. Wiener Lager type, golden amber colour.
- Cerveza Cardenal: 5.5% alcohol, Helles type, green can. Relaunched in September 2025 after Regional acquired the rights from AmBev Venezuela.
- Cerveza Cardenal Ultra: a lighter version of Cardenal, sold in blue and silver cans.

== Plants and distribution ==
=== Maracaibo Plant ===
The original plant has an area of 44,200 m2 and is located in the Los Haticos municipality, on the shore of Lake Maracaibo. Construction began in the 1920s using German equipment, and the plant began operations in 1929. The original copper brewing vats remain intact today. In 2013 a new Krones non-returnable bottle line was installed with a nominal capacity of 90,000 bottles per hour. The plant has four production lines with a capacity of 14 million litres per month.

=== Cagua Plant ===
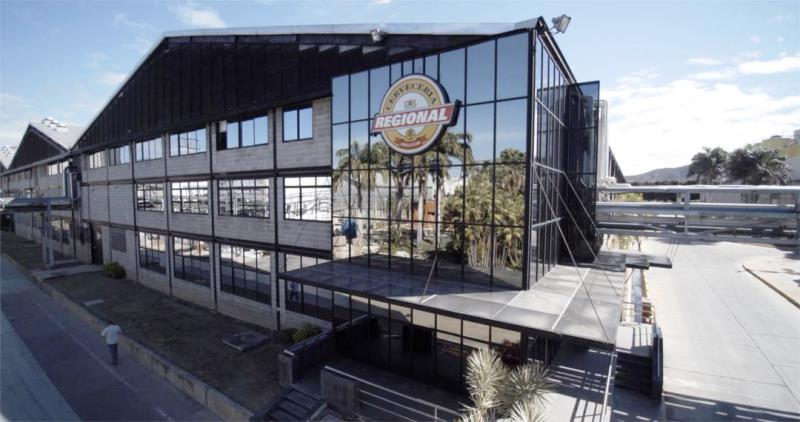
Cagua plant in 2021

The second plant, inaugurated in December 1997 in Cagua, Aragua State, has an area of 167,100 m2 and a production capacity of 33 million litres per month. It has nine production lines and is considered one of the most modern breweries in Latin America. Since 2012 it has included a wastewater treatment plant and a CO2 plant with a generation capacity of 1,000 kg per hour.

=== Distribution network ===
Cerveceria Regional operates a distribution network of 41 distribution centres (CEDIS) and 45 allied macro-distributors across Venezuela.
