= List of Pioneer League team rosters =

Below are the full rosters and coaching staff of the eight Pioneer League teams.

== Northern Division ==
=== Billings Mustangs ===
Billings Mustangs Roster
Active (25-man) Roster	Coaching Staff
Pitchers: 50 Arturo Alvarez; 21 Tariq Bacon; 18 Greg Blackman; 28 Hudson Boncal; 19 Cole Chimenti; 45 C. J. Colyer; 65 Hollis Fanning; 16 Daniel Foster; 36 Justin Fuson; 53 Julian Garcia; 43 Chris Hardin; 15 E. J. Johnson; 30 Jack Maruskin; 35 Ethan Ross; 52 Ismael Michel Sanchez; 47 Shane Spencer; 26 Thomas Wilhite; 13 Bodee Wright; Utility Players: 39 Tyler Shelnut; Catchers: 34 Ronnie Allen Jr.; 40 Sean Lynch; 5 Kyle Micklus; Infielders: 11 Evan Berkey; 23 Cameron Bowen; 24 Jacob Kline; 9 Jack O'Dowd; Outfielders: 37 Briley Knight; 49 Patrick Mills; 22 A. J. Shaver; 17 Justin Williams	Manager: -- Craig Maddox; Coaches: -- Joel Hartman (hitting); -- Dennis Rasmussen (pitching); Disabled list; ‡ Inactive list; >§ Suspended list; Roster updated July 1, 2025 Transactions

=== Glacier Range Riders ===
Glacier Range Riders Roster
Active (25-man) Roster	Coaching Staff
Pitchers: 13 Noah Barros; 1 Jonathan Clark; 19 Ryan Cloude; 37 Justin Coleman; 16 Luke Dawson; 5 Ben Ferrer; 34 Lyle Hibbitts; 35 Connor Housley; 27 Joe Kinsky; 15 Patrick Miner; 28 John Natoli; 24 Jonathan Pintaro; -- Montana Quigley; 17 Roy Robles; 39 Nathan Thomas; 3 Jack White; 29 Michael YaSenka; 38 Nick Zegna; Catchers: 4 Austin Bates; 11 Matt Clayton; -- Keenan O'Brien; -- Drew Sims; Infielders: 23 Mason Dinesen; 6 Benjamin Fitzgerald; 8 Colin Gordon; 10 Gabe Howell; -- Jake MacKenzie; 14 Jackson Raper; Outfielders: 12 Christian Kirtley; 20 Kingston Liniak; 7 Nick Lucky; 30 Dean Miller; 32 Crews Taylor	Manager: -- Todd Pratt; Coaches: -- Glendon Rusch (pitching); Disabled list; ‡ Inactive list; >§ Suspended list; updated August 7, 2023 Transactions

=== Great Falls Voyagers ===
Great Falls Voyagers Roster
Active (25-man) Roster	Coaching Staff
Pitchers: 13 Daniel Batcher; 8 Wyatt Cameron; 36 Josh Collett; 30 CJ Czerwinski; 17 Danny Galvan; 38 Luke Helton; 24 Robert Kelley; 18 Sam Lavin; 12 Nick Marshall; 39 Brendan Moody; 28 Nolan Pender; 25 Kelvin Perez; 11 Zach Voelker; Utility Players: 4 Jordan Hamberg; Catchers: 7 Jeff Nicol; 37 Jedier Hernandez; Infielders: 5 Armando Albert; 10 Trey Cruz; 9 AJ Fritz; 26 Roman Kuntz; 1 Luis Carlos Moreno; 34 Frank Podkul; 6 Kody Putman; 27 Anthony Swenda; Outfielders: 2 Emilio Corona; 23 Freddy Rojas Jr.; 21 Tommy Specht	Manager: -- Sean Repay; Coaches: -- Mark Ossanna (hitting); -- Tyler Pollock (bench); -- Chuck Shirley (pitching); Disabled list; ‡ Inactive list; >§ Suspended list; Roster updated July 7, 2025 Transactions

=== Idaho Falls Chukars ===
Idaho Falls Chukars Roster
Active (25-man) Roster	Coaching Staff
Pitchers: 46 Griffin Bremer; 51 Damon Ellis; 13 Alex Fishberg; 47 Nick Floyd; 27 Matt Geoffrion; 50 Nate Jenkins; 12 Alex Leija; 38 Keagan McGinnis; 24 Jon Nunnally; 48 Victor Rodriguez; 35 Daniel Silva; 31 Joe Slocum; 9 Jake Waters; Catchers: 33 Hunter Hisky; 30 Brady West; Infielders: 23 Steve Barmakian; 20 Andrew Don; 7 Tyler Kelly; 21 Webb Little; 4 Tyler Van Marter; 15 Tyler Wyatt; Outfielders: 29 Hogan Brown; 11 Thomas DeBonville; 36 Calvin Estrada; 17 Matt Feinstein; 25 Kona Quiggle	Manager: -- Les Lancaster; Coaches: -- Bob Milacki (pitching); Disabled list; ‡ Inactive list; >§ Suspended list; Roster updated April 18, 2024 Transactions

=== Missoula PaddleHeads ===
Missoula PaddleHeads Roster
Active (25-man) Roster	Coaching Staff
Pitchers: 9 Alfredo Villa; 33 Chris Burica; 51 Cole Cook; 7 Justin Crump; 2 Davis Delorefice; 52 William Freeman; 41 Kevin Gould; 23 Matt Mogollon; 48 Domingo Pena; 31 Mason Schwellenbach; 28 Cas Silber; 10 Mark Simon; 28 Cody Thompson; 16 Palmer Wenzel; 32 Garrett Westberg; Catchers: 37 Dean Nevarez; Infielders: 5 Chris Eusay; 4 Nick Gatewood; 15 Luke Navigato; 55 Jayson Newman; 30 McLain O'Connor; 22 Cameron Thompson; 8 A.J. Wright; Outfielders: 3 Jared Akins; 6 Brandon Riley; 11 Jacob Talamante	Manager: -- Michael Schlact; Coaches: 25 Bobby Brown (bench); 8 George Horton (bench); 29 Mason Przybilla (bench); Disabled list; ‡ Inactive list; >§ Suspended list; Roster updated April 18, 2024 Transactions

== Southern Division ==
=== Boise Hawks ===
Boise Hawks Roster
Active (25-man) Roster	Coaching Staff
Pitchers: 27 Braden Carmichael; 1 Cameron Dayton; 25 Richard Dell; 23 Graham Edwards; 16 Carter Gannaway; 45 Murphy Gienger; 14 Bardy Gilmore; 13 Hylan Hall; 41 Jack Leary; 99 Jeremiah Locklear; 21 Connor Markl; 46 Blake McFadden; 88 Trevor McGee; 5 Bryan Perez; 28 Tony Roca; 9 Chaney Trout; 26 Quinn Waterhouse; Utility Players: 42 Chase Engelhard; 20 Coleton Horner; 18 Max Jung-Goldberg; 10 John Pyle; 3 Ethan Underwood; 12 Bryson Vaughn; Catchers: 15 Ryan Grabosch; 33 J. C. Santini; Infielders: 11 Jeremiah Begora; 38 Taylor Darden; 4 Paul Myro IV; Outfielders: 8 Jake Hjelle; 6 Joseph Kalafut; 24 Jaylon Lee; 7 Noah Marcelo	Manager: -- Kash Beauchamp; Coaches: -- Dakota Conners (infield); -- Bryan Kloppe (pitching); -- Sean Persky (hitting); Disabled list; ‡ Inactive list; >§ Suspended list; Roster updated July 2, 2025 Transactions

=== Grand Junction Jackalopes ===
Grand Junction Jackalopes Roster
Active (25-man) Roster	Coaching Staff
Pitchers: 12 Josh Agnew; 27 Cody Clark; 28 Cade Crader; 33 Jimmy Dobrash; 35 Israel Fuentes; 4 Tyler Johnson; 31 Alex Leach; 23 Brett Matthews; 24 Trevin Reynolds; 10 Chase Stratton; 30 Luke Summers; 16 Michael Townsend; 49 James Varela; 32 Aydan Alger; Catchers: 19 Austin Elder; 25 Tyler Sandoval; Infielders: 6 Jake Anderson; 8 Vinny Esposito; 1 Kevin Maldonado; 2 Alexis Monge; 29 Luke Roskam; Outfielders: 18 Josh Elver; 21 Jose Gutierrez; 20 Dondrei Hubbard; 17 Frankie Jezioro; 5 Rolando Martinez; 11 Nate Scantlin	Manager: -- Jimmy Johnson; Coaches: -- Bobby Jenks (pitching); -- Joe Mikulik (hitting); -- Jordan Pacheco (hitting); Disabled list; ‡ Inactive list; >§ Suspended list; Roster updated April 18, 2024 Transactions

=== Northern Colorado Owlz ===
Northern Colorado Owlz Roster
Active (25-man) Roster	Coaching Staff
Pitchers: 32 Will Buraconak; 28 Jose Diaz; 23 Nathan Draves; 24 Chase Jessee; 22 Brandon Kaminer; 8 Dutch Landis; 16 Carter Linton; 26 Kris Massey; 31 Chris Mutter; 33 Dalton Ross; 21 Austin Schneider; 15 Mark Tindall; 19 Cory Wills; Catchers: 13 Josh Glenn; 10 Jordan Rathbone; Infielders: 9 Tim Bouchard; 36 Jackson Coutts; 3 Kevin Jimenez; 34 Nick Michaels; 18 Danny Perez; 1 Payton Robertson; Outfielders: 2 Estevan De La O; 4 Euro Diaz; 5 Henry George; 12 Abdel Guadalupe; 20 Dave Matthews	Manager: -- Frank Gonzales; Coaches: Disabled list; ‡ Inactive list; >§ Suspended list; updated July 27, 2023 Transactions

=== Ogden Raptors ===
Ogden Raptors Roster
Active (25-man) Roster	Coaching Staff
Pitchers: 43 Carson Angeroth; 15 Brayden Bonner; 96 Ryan Cloud; 30 Guillermo Cuevas; 14 Eli Elliott; 29 Alex Friesen; 44 Christian Griffin; 47 Shane Gustafson; 48 Matthew Hess; 33 Chris Macca; 31 Gabriel Pacheco; 28 David Reckers; 12 Nico Saltaformaggio; 17 Adrian Santa Cruz; 3 Mark Schommer; 85 Ryan Steckline; 46 Shawn Triplett; 13 Rafael Vazquez; 26 Quinn Waterhouse; 10 Bruce Yamamoto; Utility Players: 35 Landen Barns; Catchers: 27 Thomas Greely; Infielders: 22 Connor Bagnieski; 8 Christian Coipel; 9 Raymond Gill; 45 Matthew Golda; 3 Cole Jordan; 36 John Pyle; 37 Christopher Sargent; Outfielders: 16 Jack Cone; 11 Parker DePasquale; 86 Will Fuenning; 23 Anthony Herron Jr.; 21 Pearce Howard; 18 Kenny Oyama; 6 Chuck Steele; 5 Nick Ultsch	Manager: 34 Evan Parker; Coaches: 7 Ed Campaniello (hitting/bench); Disabled list; ‡ Inactive list; >§ Suspended list; Roster updated June 29, 2024 Transactions

=== Rocky Mountain Vibes ===
Rocky Mountain Vibes Roster
Active (25-man) Roster	Coaching Staff
Pitchers: 4 Christian Day; 30 Garrett Hill; 24 Carlos Lomeli; 21 Myles Martinez; 35 Trey Morrill; 32 Daniel Nunan; 16 Jaxon O'Neal; 19 Zach Ottinger; 18 Max Pettey; 12 Kyle Pijaszek; 20 Nick Powers; 31 Bryson Spagnuolo; 10 Dustin Sprong; 26 Andrew Vail; 14 Kelsey Ward; Utility Players: 29 Luke Powell; Catchers: 25 Tyler Davis; 9 Billy Hancock; Infielders: 5 Josh Day; 3 Devyn Lopez; 2 Eddie McCabe; 13 Slater Schield; 28 Dane Tofteland; 15 Ernie Yake; Outfielders: 6 Brett Carson; 8 Steven Rivas; 22 Mason Sykes; 11 Stephen Wilmer	Manager: -- Les Lancaster; Coaches: -- Chad De La Guerra (co-hitting/defense); -- Mike Hartley (pitching); -- Rafael Melchione (co-hitting/catching); Disabled list; ‡ Inactive list; >§ Suspended list; Roster updated June 29, 2024 Transactions

== Pacific West Division ==
=== Oakland Ballers ===
Oakland Ballers Roster
Active (25-man) Roster	Coaching Staff
Pitchers: 26 Adam Bogosian; 17 Reed Butz; 32 James Colyer; 40 Brody Eglite; 10 Caleb Franzen; 16 Carson Lambert; 33 Dylan Matsuoka; 30 Noah Millikan; 35 Conner Richardson; 39 Luke Short; 14 Zach St. Pierre; 21 Connor Sullivan; 56 Gabe Tanner; Utility Players: 11 Davis Drewek; 27 Pat Monteith; Catchers: 2 Tyler Lozano; 7 Dillon Tatum; Infielders: 29 Christian Almanza; 15 Cam Bufford; 3 Tremayne Cobb Jr.; 4 Daniel Harris IV; 23 Nick Leehey; 20 Ryan Pierce; 9 Esai Santos; Outfielders: 19 Darryl Buggs; 28 Lou Helmig; 8 Michael O'Hara	Manager: -- Aaron Miles; Coaches: -- Dee Brown (bullpen); -- Jim Dedrick (pitching); Disabled list; ‡ Inactive list; >§ Suspended list; Roster updated 2025-06-29 Transactions

=== Yuba-Sutter High Wheelers ===
Yuba-Sutter High Wheelers Roster
Active (25-man) Roster	Coaching Staff
Pitchers: 32 Kris Anglin; 21 Ethan Bates; 20 Mason Bryant; 27 Cole Cressend; 44 Jayden Drake; 37 Sam Drumheller; 14 Scott Ellis; 23 Andrew Garcia; 30 Jonah Jenkins; 38 Matthew Kavanaugh; 24 Andrew LaCour; 33 Nate Madej; 28 Chase Martinez; 6 Brandon McPherson; 35 Christian Womble; 22 Brett Wozniak; 17 Jack Zalasky; Utility Players: 10 Josh Duarte; Catchers: 36 Mike Campagna; 25 Adam Juran; Infielders: 2 Kirkland Banks; 34 Cuba Bess; 5 Parker Coddou; 15 Connor Denning; 11 Bobby Lada; Outfielders: 7 Leyton Barry; 19 Gio Brusa; 4 Cooper Hext; 9 River Orsak; 21 Landon Wallace	Manager: 3 Billy Horton; Coaches: 12 Gary Davenport (bench); 57 Jerome Williams (pitching); Disabled list; ‡ Inactive list; >§ Suspended list; Roster updated 2025-06-29 Transactions
