= David Hulse =

American baseball player (born 1968)

- Center fielder
- Born: February 25, 1968 (age 58); San Angelo, Texas, U.S.
- Batted: Left Threw: Left

MLB debut
- August 11, 1992, for the Texas Rangers

Last MLB appearance
- September 7, 1996, for the Milwaukee Brewers

MLB statistics
- Batting average: .266
- Home runs: 5
- Runs batted in: 103
- Stats at Baseball Reference

Teams
- Texas Rangers (1992–1994); Milwaukee Brewers (1995–1996)

David Lindsey Hulse (born February 25, 1968), is an American former professional baseball center fielder who played in Major League Baseball (MLB) for the Texas Rangers and Milwaukee Brewers, from 1992–1996.

== Career ==
=== College ===
Hulse played collegiate baseball at Schreiner University in Kerrville, Texas, and was drafted by the Rangers in the thirteenth round of the 1990 amateur draft.

=== Professional ===
He made it to the big leagues in 1992, batting .302 in 32 games. The following year, installed as a center fielder for the Texas Rangers, Hulse hit .290 and stole 29 bases, earning him one third-place vote for Rookie of the Year; Hulse ultimately finished tied for eighth place with one point. But despite his speed and defense, Hulse was not much of a power hitter (just five home runs in a career 1,265 at-bats), so he was traded to the Milwaukee Brewers in 1995.

Hulse was involved in two amusing on-field incidents. On October 3, 1992, against the California Angels, he fouled off two straight pitches into the far end of the opposing dugout, causing the Angels to scramble. Then he fouled off another pitch in the same spot, inducing the California players and coaches (and even an Anaheim police officer, who waved a white towel as if in surrender) to congregate in the other end of the dugout. Then Hulse did it again, in almost exactly the same spot, causing a number of Angels to clap in admiration. Finally, he grounded out to the shortstop, after which the Angels players returned to the far end of the dugout.

In a game against the Cleveland Indians on May 26, 1993, Hulse was in center field when the Indians' Carlos Martínez hit a ball to deep right-center field that bounced off the head of right fielder Jose Canseco and over the fence for a home run. Hulse can be seen laughing and joking with Canseco and, apparently, explaining to him what had just happened.

He was traded to the Milwaukee Brewers for Scott Taylor on April 14, 1995. The Rangers made the transaction to clear space on its roster for Mickey Tettleton who had signed with the ball club two days earlier. Hulse’s baseball career was derailed on September 7, 1996, in a game against his former team, the Rangers. Hulse was on third base and attempted to score on a ground ball toward first base. When the throw came home, Hulse tried to slide around catcher Dave Valle and touch the outside of the plate. Valle, however, was firmly planted at the plate, and the two collided. In the collision, Hulse’s humerus was forced against his chest, causing significant damage and severely limiting his arm movement.

After rehabbing in 1997, Hulse attempted a comeback in 1998-99 with the AAA franchises of both the Boston Red Sox and St. Louis Cardinals. Despite hitting a combined .332, Hulse was not promoted back to the majors and retired from baseball.
