= Fernando Viña =

American baseball player (born 1969)

- Second baseman
- Born: April 16, 1969 (age 57); Sacramento, California, U.S.
- Batted: Left Threw: Right

MLB debut
- April 10, 1993, for the Seattle Mariners

Last MLB appearance
- May 11, 2004, for the Detroit Tigers

MLB statistics
- Batting average: .282
- Home runs: 40
- Runs batted in: 343
- Stats at Baseball Reference

Teams
- Seattle Mariners (1993); New York Mets (1994); Milwaukee Brewers (1995–1999); St. Louis Cardinals (2000–2003); Detroit Tigers (2004)

Career highlights and awards
- All-Star (1998); 2× Gold Glove Award (2001, 2002); Milwaukee Brewers Wall of Honor

Fernando Viña Spanish: [feɾˈnando ˈβiɲa]; born April 16, 1969) is a Cuban-American former Major League Baseball second baseman and former MLB analyst for ESPN. His parents Andres and Olga emigrated from Cuba in 1968. From 1993 through 2005, Viña played for the Seattle Mariners (1993), New York Mets (1994), Milwaukee Brewers (1995-1999), St. Louis Cardinals (2000-2003), and Detroit Tigers (2004).

== Career ==
Viña was acquired by the Brewers on December 22, 1994, to complete a transaction that began three weeks earlier on November 30 when Doug Henry was traded to the Mets and also included minor-league catcher Javier Gonzalez being sent to Milwaukee on December 6.

On May 31, 1996, while attempting to tag the runner and make a throw to first to complete a double play, Viña was caught off guard and knocked down by Albert Belle, an incident which led to Belle receiving a 5-game suspension from the American League. In a 2018 interview, Viña good-naturedly laughed about the incident, claiming "that put me on the map," meaning that the play was regularly featured in highlight footage on television.

Viña was a two-time Gold Glove winner (2001-2002), and a National League All-Star in 1998, becoming the first ever NL representative from the Brewers, who had moved to the league that year.

In 2004, he was limited to 29 games for the Tigers—a serious leg injury ended his first season with Detroit, and Viña missed the entire 2005 season because of a strained right hamstring and patellar tendinitis in his left knee, but his signing was the first of several major acquisitions that led to the Tigers' resurrection to a playoff contender.

In 2006, Viña was invited to spring training by the Seattle Mariners but was cut before the start of the season due to a labrum tear in his right hip, in effect bringing an end to his 12-year career. Viña retired with a .282 batting average, 40 home runs and 343 RBI in 1148 games played. In 2007, Viña joined ESPN as an analyst for Baseball Tonight to do about 60 shows during the 2007, 2008, and 2009 seasons. He was inducted into the Arizona State Hall of Fame in 2011 and Milwaukee Brewers Wall of Honor in 2014. He hit the first inside-the-park home run ever in both AT&T Park and Miller Park.

== Mitchell Report ==
On December 13, 2007, Viña was mentioned in the Mitchell Report in connection with steroid use. The report cited an interview with former Mets clubhouse attendant Derek Sprang, who claimed Viña purchased anabolic steroids from him six to eight times between 2000 and 2005. The two first met in 1993 when Viña was in the Mets minor league system, and Viña's personal contact information was listed in Radomski's address book seized by federal agents investigating Radomski. Three checks from Viña to Kirk Radomski for purchases of HGH and steroids were included in the Mitchell Report itself as further evidence of Viña's steroid use. Viña later confirmed during an airing of SportsCenter that he used HGH in 2003 to recover from injuries, but denied ever using steroids or purchasing them from Radomski.

== Popular culture ==
Viña was featured in the music video for Jermaine Dupri's Welcome To Atlanta (Coast to Coast Remix) with Nelly, Murphy Lee and the St. Lunatics.

== See also ==
- List of Major League Baseball players named in the Mitchell Report
