= Duane Singleton =

American baseball player (born 1972)

- Center fielder
- Born: August 6, 1972 (age 53); Staten Island, New York, U.S.
- Batted: Left Threw: Right

MLB debut
- August 4, 1994, for the Milwaukee Brewers

Last MLB appearance
- June 6, 1996, for the Detroit Tigers

MLB statistics
- Batting average: .126
- Runs batted in: 3
- Runs: 5
- Stolen bases: 1
- Stats at Baseball Reference

Teams
- Milwaukee Brewers (1994–1995); Detroit Tigers (1996)

Duane Earl Singleton (born August 6, 1972) is an American former Major League Baseball center fielder. Singleton was drafted by the Milwaukee Brewers in the fifth round of the 1990 Major League Baseball draft. He played with the team at the Major League level for two seasons before being traded to the Detroit Tigers for minor league player Henry Santos in 1996. Singleton played one season with the Tigers before being released by the team later in the year.
