= Mike Thomas (baseball) =

American baseball player (born 1969)

- Pitcher
- Born: September 2, 1969; Sacramento, California, U.S.
- Batted: Left Threw: Left

MLB debut
- July 12, 1995, for the Milwaukee Brewers

Last MLB appearance
- July 12, 1995, for the Milwaukee Brewers

MLB statistics
- Win–loss record: 0–0
- Earned run average: 0.00
- Strikeouts: 0
- Stats at Baseball Reference

Teams
- Milwaukee Brewers (1995)

Mike Thomas (born September 2, 1969) is an American former professional baseball pitcher He played one game in Major League Baseball (MLB) for the Milwaukee Brewers in 1995.

== College ==
Thomas played baseball at the collegiate level at Labette Community College.

== Baseball career ==
Thomas was drafted in the twenty-third round of the 1989 Major League Baseball draft by the New York Mets. In 1991, he was traded along with Ron Darling to the Montreal Expos for Tim Burke. Later that year, he was selected in the rule 5 draft by the Cleveland Indians. He was returned to the Expos by the Indians the following year. In 1993, he signed as a free agent with the Milwaukee Brewers organization. He was a member of the team at the Major League level in 1995.
