= Wilson Heredia =

Dominican baseball player

- Pitcher
- Born: March 30, 1972 (age 54); La Romana, La Romana, Dominican Republic
- Batted: Right Threw: Right

MLB debut
- April 27, 1995, for the Texas Rangers

Last MLB appearance
- September 20, 1997, for the Texas Rangers

MLB statistics
- Win–loss record: 1–1
- Earned run average: 3.41
- Strikeouts: 14

CPBL statistics
- Win–loss record: 5–8
- Earned run average: 3.74
- Strikeouts: 57
- Stats at Baseball Reference

Teams
- Texas Rangers (1995, 1997); Sinon Bulls (2001)

Wilson Heredia (born March 30, 1972) is a Dominican former Major League Baseball (MLB) pitcher who played two seasons with the Texas Rangers. He batted and threw right-handed.

== Career ==
Heredia was signed by the Rangers as an amateur free agent prior to the 1990 season. He made his major league debut early in the 1995 season, appearing in six games before being sent back down to the minor leagues. Later that season, he and Scott Podsednik were the "players to be named later" that the Rangers dealt to the Florida Marlins in exchange for Bobby Witt, and he spent the remainder of the 1995 season with the Double-A Portland Sea Dogs.

After the 1996 season the Rangers claimed him off waivers from the Marlins. He spent most of the 1997 season with the Triple-A Oklahoma City 89ers before being called back up to the major league club that August. Heredia appeared in 10 games for the Rangers that season; his final major league game was on September 20, 1997 against the Anaheim Angels. The Rangers granted him free agency following the season.

Heredia spent 1998 in the New York Yankees minor-league system and 2000 playing for the independent Newark Bears before leaving American professional baseball at age 28.
