= Sid Roberson (baseball) =

American baseball player

- Pitcher
- Born: September 7, 1971 (age 54); Jacksonville, Florida, U.S.
- Batted: Left Threw: Left

MLB debut
- May 20, 1995, for the Milwaukee Brewers

Last MLB appearance
- September 29, 1995, for the Milwaukee Brewers

MLB statistics
- Win–loss record: 6–4
- Earned run average: 5.76
- Strikeouts: 40
- Stats at Baseball Reference

Teams
- Milwaukee Brewers (1995)

Sidney Dean Roberson (born September 7, 1971) is a former pitcher in Major League Baseball who played for the Milwaukee Brewers during their 1995 season. Listed at 5' 9", 170 lb., Roberson batted and threw left-handed. He was born in Jacksonville, Florida.

The Brewers selected Roberson in the 29th round of the 1992 MLB draft out of the University of North Florida in Jacksonville, Florida, where he pitched for the UNF Ospreys. He finished his college career with a 36-6 mark and still holds the career record for the most strikeouts (360) and complete games (24) at UNF. Besides, he was a two-time NAIA All-America pitcher at UNF and majored in accounting in college, getting his degree in 1994 with a 3.91 GPA and highest academic honors.

Roberson posted a 12-8 record with a 2.60 earned run average for Class A Stockton Ports in 1993, earning Pitcher of the Year honors in the California League. In 1994, he went 15-8 with a 2.83 at Double A El Paso Diablos, being promoted to Triple A New Orleans Zephyrs in 1995, where he appeared in two games before joining the Brewers in the month of May.

Roberson was 6-4 with a 5.76 ERA for Milwaukee in 26 games (13 starts), striking out 40 batters while walking 37 in 84 1/3 innings of work. However, arm problems surfaced which forced him to retire after two rotator cuff surgeries.

Following his baseball career, Roberson became a financial adviser and later a manager with Morgan Stanley, where he worked for nearly a decade. He later joined UBS Financial Services as deputy branch manager of its Jacksonville complex.
