= César Devarez =

Dominican baseball player (born 1969)

- Catcher
- Born: September 22, 1969 (age 56); San Francisco de Macorís, Dominican Republic
- Batted: Right Threw: Right

MLB debut
- June 3, 1995, for the Baltimore Orioles

Last MLB appearance
- September 29, 1996, for the Baltimore Orioles

MLB statistics
- Batting average: .091
- Home runs: 0
- Runs batted in: 0
- Stats at Baseball Reference

Teams
- Baltimore Orioles (1995–1996)

César Salvatore Devarez Santana (born September 22, 1969) is a Dominican former Major League Baseball (MLB) catcher who played with the Baltimore Orioles in 1995 and 1996.
