= Brian Givens =

American baseball player (born 1965)

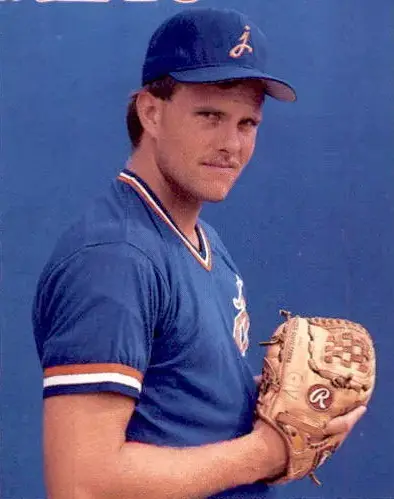
- Givens with the Jackson Mets c. 1988
- Pitcher
- Born: November 6, 1965 (age 60); Lompoc, California, U.S.
- Batted: Right Threw: Left

Professional debut
- MLB: June 24, 1995, for the Milwaukee Brewers
- NPB: April 10, 1997, for the Seibu Lions

Last appearance
- MLB: June 26, 1996, for the Milwaukee Brewers
- NPB: October 5, 1997, for the Seibu Lions

MLB statistics
- Win–loss record: 6–10
- Earned run average: 5.86
- Strikeouts: 83

NPB statistics
- Win–loss record: 4–6
- Earned run average: 5.10
- Strikeouts: 45
- Stats at Baseball Reference

Teams
- Milwaukee Brewers (1995–1996); Seibu Lions (1997)

Brian Allen Givens (born November 6, 1965) was an American former professional baseball pitcher. He played in Major League Baseball (MLB) for the Milwaukee Brewers, and in Nippon Professional Baseball (NPB) for the Seibu Lions.

Givens was known most for being a replacement player who crossed picket lines during spring training in 1995 while the 1994–95 Major League Baseball strike was still going on. He also was notable for having endured six arm surgeries—including Tommy John surgery before making his major-league debut.

== Early life and education ==
Givens graduated from Overland High School in Aurora, Colorado.

== Minor-league career ==
A left-handed pitcher, Givens was drafted by the New York Mets in 1984 in the 10th round of the now-defunct January amateur draft. He began his minor-league career immediately after high school, starting out at the Rookie league level with the Kingsport Mets in the Appalachian League in 1984. Givens went 4–1 for Kingsport, making 14 appearances, striking out 51, walking 52, and posting a 6.50 earned-run average.

In 1985, Givens split the season between two teams: the Short season Single-A league Little Falls Mets in the New York–Penn League and the full season A league Columbia Mets in the South Atlantic League. Givens did well, going 3–4 with a 2.93 earned-run average in 11 appearances with Little Falls, and going 1–2 with a 2.95 earned-run average in three appearances with Columbia.

The following year, Givens pitched for the Mets for the entire season, posting an 8–7 record with a 3.77 earned-run average in 27 games.

In 1987, Givens actually briefly rose to the Triple-A International League level, pitching for one game with the Tidewater Tides (and posting a 0–1 mark with a 24.55 earned-run average from that one game; his outing lasted just three and two-thirds innings) but spending almost the entire season at the "High-A" level with the Lynchburg Hillcats. In his time with Lynchburg, Givens went 6–8 with a 4.65 earned-run average in 21 games.

In 1988, Givens spent the entire season with the Jackson Mets in the Class AA Texas League, going 6–14 with a 3.78 earned-run average in 26 games. During the season, however, Givens' elbow popped, requiring a surgery to move his ulnar nerve and taking five miles an hour off his fastball. The following year, Givens pitched largely for the Jackson Mets again, going 3–5 with a 3.39 earned-run average in 13 games. He also pitched for one game in 1989 with the St. Lucie Mets in the High-A Florida State League, posting an 0–1 mark with no earned-run average in a five-inning stint.

In 1990, Givens returned to Tidewater, posting a 4–6 mark with a 4.12 earned-run average in 15 games. Partway through the season, on June 19, 1990, Givens was traded to the Seattle Mariners' Class AAA Calgary Cannons team in exchange for Mario Díaz, after Givens had arm trouble. Givens wound up going 0–1 with a 12.71 earned-run average in two games with Calgary, with his elbow blowing out in his second start at Calgary. The Mariners alleged that the Mets knowingly had peddled damaged goods, but the trade held out. Givens underwent a second arm surgery that revealed a stress fracture of the ulna bone.

The following year, Givens suffered more injury trouble. He threw in one game with San Bernardino in the California League, going 1–0 with a 1.80 earned-run average. He then pitched in just three games with Calgary, going 1–0 with a 4.91 earned-run average, before blowing out a ligament. This required a third surgery—this time Tommy John surgery—in August 1991.

In early 1992, Givens developed a tender spot on the outside of his elbow, opposite of the surgery, requiring arthroscopy. While still rehabbing, Givens was released by the Mariners on June 2, 1992. On August 6, 1992, he was signed by the Kansas City Royals organization. He pitched in seven games for the Memphis Chicks, who at that time were the Royals' Class AA minor-league club in the Southern League. Givens posted no record and a 3.24 earned-run average, and wound up needing another arthroscopy to remove four large chips.

In 1993, Givens again pitched for Memphis, going 1–3 in 14 games with a 4.58 earned-run average. He also threw in four games for the Royals' team in the Gulf Coast League, going 0–1 with a 3.38 earned-run average. On October 15, 1993, Givens filed for free agency. On December 8, 1993, Givens was signed as a free agent by the Chicago White Sox.

Givens spent the entire 1994 season with the White Sox's Birmingham Barons team in the Southern League, playing alongside basketball great Michael Jordan.They were good friends on the team. While at Birmingham, Givens went 4–7 with a 3.68 earned-run average in 36 games.

On October 31, 1994, Givens was signed as a free agent by the Milwaukee Brewers.

== Replacement baseball ==
In early 1995, the Brewers asked Givens to be a replacement player. Although he did not originally say yes, he wound up doing so to help pay for a mortgage debt. "I needed money and couldn't get it anywhere else", he told the Sporting News in 1995. "That was it, basically."

After the 234-day players strike ended in before the 1995 baseball season ever officially began, Givens was sent to the Brewers' Class AAA New Orleans Zephyrs ballclub, where he worked with pitching coach and former major-league relief pitcher Bill Campbell, who taught Givens a slider and helped him to improve his changeup.

== Major-league debut and career ==
After pitching well with New Orleans, where he posted a 7–4 record and a 2.55 earned-run average in 16 games, Givens was promoted to the Brewers.

As had been the case with his teammate Ron Rightnowar, there was some bitterness toward Givens by the major-leaguers because of his role as a replacement player. "I've spent 11½ years in the minor leagues, I have a mortgage and two kids to feed", he told the Sporting News in 1995. "I had to pay my bills, and I couldn't see quitting not after what I've been through." However, Givens also said given the chance to do it again, he would not have been a replacement player. "Now that I'm here and I see how everything works, I regret what I did", Givens said in July 1995. "I was really undecided and didn't want to do it, then I said I would. One thing about this team, there's a bunch of really good guys here. Maybe they're not all going to be our best friends off the field, but when we're on the field they're going to support us like we support them." In a different interview, Givens went one step further, dismissing the talent level of some of his fellow replacement players. "At the time, it's what I had to do", he told the Seattle Times in July 1995. "I told everyone on the team that. Of course, I regretted the decision. But I had to take care of my family. Those games were a joke. The talent level was horrible. To put myself in the same shoes with guys off the street made me sick. It wasn't really baseball."

At age 29, Givens made his big-league debut on June 24, 1995, pitching well in a loss. In his second game, Givens was shelled. "I would have sent him back to the minor leagues if I had somebody else to replace him with", the Brewers' manager, Phil Garner, told the Sporting News. "His problem was he wasn't throwing his breaking ball for strikes. We got him to be more aggressive. He responded. I changed my opinion on him." Givens earned his first major league win on July 16, 1995. "There are a lot of guys who make it to the big leagues despite injuries or a lot of time served in the minors", Givens said shortly after his first big-league win. "It just so happens persistence paid off for me. I'm just very fortunate, with all my operations, I can still throw the ball the way I can." Givens finished his rookie big-league season with a 7–5 record and a 3.95 earned-run average in 19 games.

Givens pitched for five more seasons in the majors—in 1996, when he went 3-1 with a 2.86 earned-run average in four games. He had begun the season on a 30-day rehabilitation assignment with New Orleans after injuring his back in his final throwing session at home in Aurora, Colorado the day before he left for 1996 spring training. After his 30-day rehab assignment, Givens unexpectedly ended up staying longer in AAA instead of being promoted to the major leagues. "I was chapped at the time", Givens said of his frustration with not being called up sooner in 1996. "I didn't pitch well the first few games, then I finally got my head on straight." Givens was called up in June and was hit hard in four starts. While at New Orleans in 1996, however, Givens pitched well, going 10–9 with a 3.02 earned-run average. He filed for free agency on October 15, 1996, after he and the Brewers decided to part ways by mutual agreement.

== After major-league baseball ==
In 1997, Givens signed with the Saitama Seibu Lions in Japan. "If you think you're going to be stuck in AAA, you can go make some money in Japan", Givens said in 2005. "It can be pretty lucrative if you do well." Givens ended the 1997 season with a 6-4 record and a 3.10 earned-run average.

In 1998, Givens returned to North America, pitching for the Shreveport Captains in the Double-A Texas League.

== Personal ==
While playing in the minors, Givens operated an off-season carpet cleaning business.

Givens has three children: a son, Bryce; and a daughter, Bailee. Bryce Givens plays football for the University of Colorado at Boulder. Givens third child: a son, Ryan, a junior college prospect plays baseball for Illinois Central College (JUCO) in Peoria, Il.

Givens' love in life is his family and the sport of baseball. He still coaches baseball and is the coach of a team who won the state championship.
