= Ariel Prieto =

Cuban baseball player (born 1969)

- Pitcher
- Born: October 22, 1969 (age 56); Havana, Cuba
- Batted: Right Threw: Right

MLB debut
- July 2, 1995, for the Oakland Athletics

Last MLB appearance
- May 10, 2001, for the Tampa Bay Devil Rays

MLB statistics
- Win–loss record: 15–24
- Earned run average: 4.85
- Strikeouts: 231
- Stats at Baseball Reference

Teams
- Oakland Athletics (1995–1998, 2000); Tampa Bay Devil Rays (2001); As Coach: Oakland Athletics (2011–2014); Arizona Diamondbacks (2016–2017)

Ariel Prieto (born October 22, 1969) is a Cuban former professional baseball pitcher. He played in Major League Baseball (MLB) from 1995 to 2001 for the Oakland Athletics and Tampa Bay Devil Rays. He is currently the pitching coach for the GCL Mets.

== Career ==
Prieto played baseball both for Fajardo University, located in Santiago de Cuba, and for Piratas de Isla de la Juventud in the Cuban National Series, a winter baseball league in Cuba. Concerned that he would be unable to leave Cuba if he was highly valued as an athlete, Prieto intentionally pitched poorly during the winter of 1994. Prieto and his wife were granted visas to travel outside of Cuba in April 1995, and they relocated to Florida.

Prieto was selected fifth overall in the 1995 MLB draft by the Oakland Athletics. He made his major-league debut for the Athletics that July. Prieto, being unfamiliar with American banks and credit cards, walked around with his $1.2 million signing-bonus check in his pocket for over a week. He won two games and lost six, becoming one of the few players to be drafted and then play in MLB during the same season. In 1996, Prieto had what was arguably his best season, winning 6 games and losing 7 with an earned run average (ERA) of 4.15.

Prieto was traded to the Tampa Bay Devil Rays before the 2001 season. With the Devil Rays, Prieto saw action in three games, without any decisions, allowing one earned run in 3 2/3 innings pitched. His one season with the Devil Rays was his last season in the major leagues. Prieto played in Mexico during the middle 2000s, playing with the Venados de Mazatlán, a team that he also played for in the Caribbean World Series, held that year in Venezuela. During six MLB seasons, Prieto won 15 games and lost 24, with an overall 4.85 ERA.

Prieto played professionally until 2005 in Minor League Baseball, without returning to MLB.

=== Coaching career ===
Prieto spent the 2009 through 2011 seasons as the pitching coach for the Athletics' Arizona League team.

On November 10, 2011, Prieto was announced as the pitching coach for the Vermont Lake Monsters, the Athletics' New York–Penn League (Single A, short season) team.

From 2012 to 2015, Prieto served as interpreter for fellow Cuban defector, New York Mets outfielder Yoenis Céspedes.

In 2015, Prieto was hired as a coach for the Arizona Diamondbacks. He was let go in 2017.

Prieto was named as the pitching coach for the GCL Mets of the New York Mets organization for the 2018 season.

== See also ==
- List of baseball players who defected from Cuba
- List of baseball players who went directly to Major League Baseball
