= Jim Dedrick =

American baseball player (born 1968)

Oakland Ballers
- Pitcher
- Born: April 4, 1968 (age 58); Los Angeles, California, U.S.
- Batted: Switch Threw: Right

MLB debut
- August 12, 1995, for the Baltimore Orioles

Last MLB appearance
- September 19, 1995, for the Baltimore Orioles

MLB statistics
- Win–loss record: 0–0
- Earned run average: 2.35
- Strikeouts: 3
- Stats at Baseball Reference

Teams
- Baltimore Orioles (1995)

James Michael Dedrick (born April 4, 1968) is an American former professional baseball player. A pitcher, Dedrick played for the Baltimore Orioles of Major League Baseball (MLB) in 1995. Dedrick was drafted by the Baltimore Orioles in the 33rd round of the 1990 MLB draft. He pitched in six games in 1995, striking out 3 and walking 6 guys in 7 and 2/3 innings.

Dedrick attended Huntington Beach High School and later Southern California College.

After his playing days, Dedrick worked briefly for Bioforce Baseball academy in Beaverton, Oregon before becoming a scout for the Arizona Diamondbacks. In 2016, he was listed as a member of the MLB scouting staff of the Pittsburgh Pirates.

In 2024, Dedrick became the pitching coach for the Oakland Ballers of the Pioneer League.
