= Scott Taylor (right-handed pitcher) =

American baseball player (born 1966)

- Pitcher
- Born: October 3, 1966 (age 59); Topeka, Kansas, U.S.
- Batted: Right Threw: Right

MLB debut
- July 28, 1995, for the Texas Rangers

Last MLB appearance
- August 7, 1995, for the Texas Rangers

MLB statistics
- Win–loss record: 1–2
- Earned run average: 9.39
- Strikeouts: 10
- Stats at Baseball Reference

Teams
- Texas Rangers (1995)

Scott Michael Taylor (born October 3, 1966 in Topeka, Kansas), is an American former professional baseball pitcher. He played in Major League Baseball (MLB) for the Texas Rangers.

== Biography ==
Taylor attended the University of Kansas, then was drafted by the Seattle Mariners in the 15th round of the 1988 MLB draft. He played in Minor League Baseball for the Mariners during 1989 and 1990, reaching the Double-A level. In December 1990, Taylor was traded to the Atlanta Braves.

Taylor played in Atlanta's farm system from 1991 through 1992, mostly at the Double-A level. In June 1992, he was released by the Braves, then signed by the Milwaukee Brewers. He played in the Brewers organization during 1993, 1994, and part of 1995, mainly at the Triple-A level. In April 1995, Taylor was traded to the Texas Rangers for outfielder David Hulse. He had a 61–45 win–loss record with a 3.97 earned run average (ERA) in six minor-league seasons at the time of the transaction.

With Texas during the 1995 season, Taylor pitched in 22 Triple-A games for the Oklahoma City 89ers and pitched in three games (all starts) for the Rangers. In those major-league games, Taylor had a 1–2 record with a 9.39 ERA. After the season, he became a free agent.

Taylor played for multiple minor-league teams during 1996–1998, mainly at the Triple-A level. He did not play professionally after 1998, finishing his minor-league career with a 93–70 record in 303 games (196 starts) with a 4.12 ERA while striking out 867 batters in 1331 innings pitched.
