= Bob Scanlan =

American baseball player (born 1966)

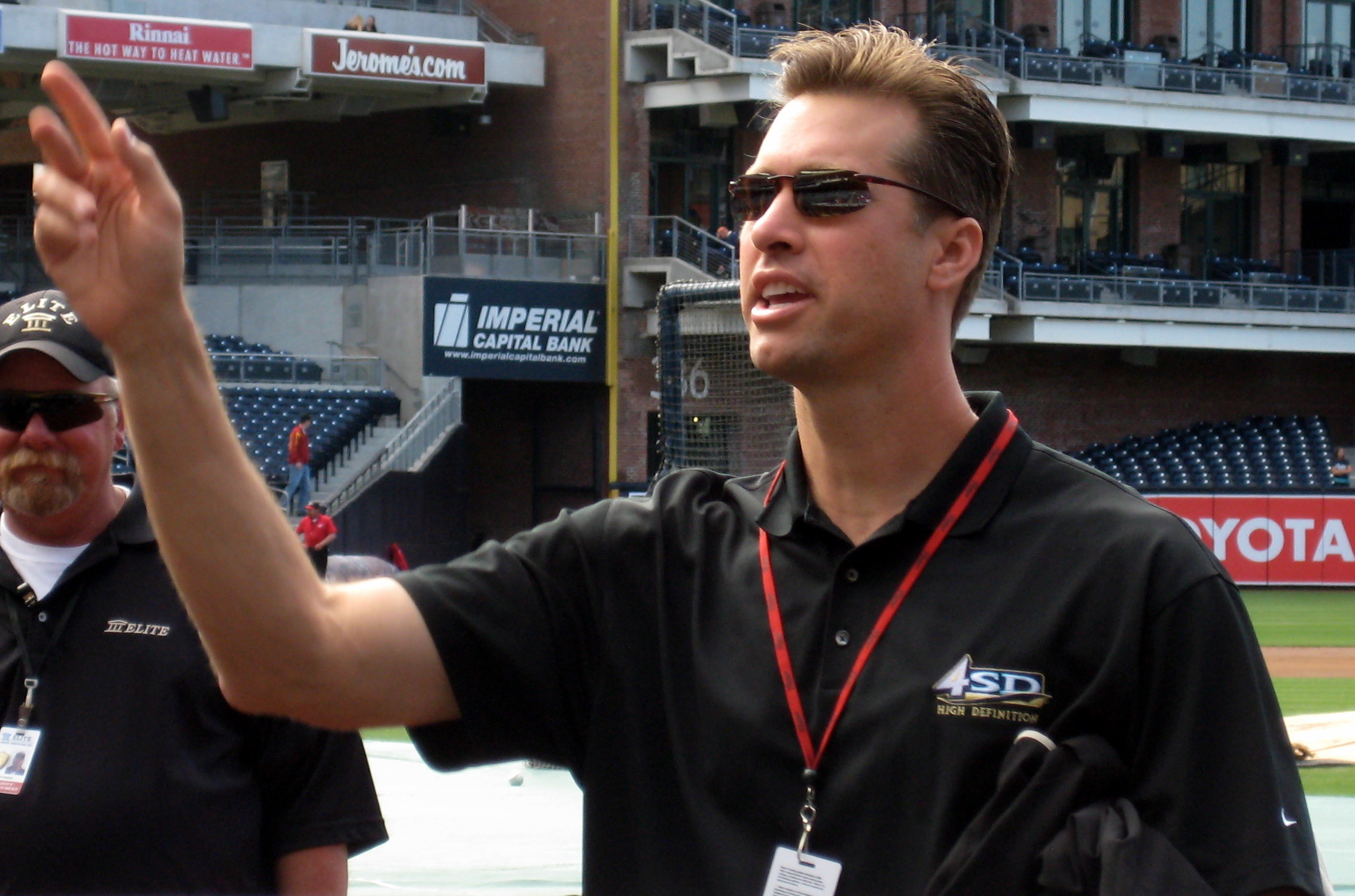
- Scanlan in 2008
- Pitcher
- Born: August 9, 1966 (age 59); Los Angeles, California, U.S.
- Batted: Right Threw: Right

MLB debut
- May 7, 1991, for the Chicago Cubs

Last MLB appearance
- September 29, 2001, for the Montreal Expos

MLB statistics
- Win–loss record: 20–34
- Earned run average: 4.63
- Strikeouts: 245
- Stats at Baseball Reference

Teams
- Chicago Cubs (1991–1993); Milwaukee Brewers (1994–1995); Detroit Tigers (1996); Kansas City Royals (1996); Houston Astros (1998); Milwaukee Brewers (2000); Montreal Expos (2001)

Robert Guy Scanlan Jr. (born August 9, 1966), is an American former professional baseball pitcher. He played in Major League Baseball (MLB) for the Chicago Cubs (1991–1993), Milwaukee Brewers (1994–1995, 2000), Detroit Tigers (1996), Kansas City Royals (1996), Houston Astros (1998) and Montreal Expos (2001).

== Career ==
=== Playing career ===
In 290 games, Scanlan put together a 20–34 record with 17 saves, 245 strikeouts and a 4.63 ERA. In parts of 9 seasons, he played for the Chicago Cubs, Milwaukee Brewers, Detroit Tigers, Kansas City Royals, Houston Astros, and Montreal Expos.

=== Post-playing career ===
In the January 2008 issue of San Diego Magazine he was selected as one of the "50 People to Watch in 2008".

As of 2012, Scanlan serves as a color analyst for San Diego Padres radio broadcasts, and previously had worked as a pregame and postgame host for Padres telecasts on 4SD. Scanlan also sometimes serves as the field reporter for Padres TV broadcasts.

On June 13, 2022, Scanlan joined Tony Gwynn Jr. as the 97.3 radio play by play commentator in order to replace Jesse Agler for the night. On Aug 14, 2023, Scanlan joined Jesse Agler as the 97.3 Analyst in order to replace Tony Gwynn Jr.
