= Tim Unroe =

American baseball player

- First baseman
- Born: October 7, 1970 (age 55); Round Lake Beach, Illinois, U.S.
- Batted: Right Threw: Right

Professional debut
- MLB: May 30, 1995, for the Milwaukee Brewers
- NPB: July 12, 2001, for the Chunichi Dragons

Last appearance
- MLB: September 30, 2000, for the Atlanta Braves
- NPB: July 19, 2001, for the Chunichi Dragons

MLB statistics
- Batting average: .221
- Home runs: 3
- Runs batted in: 11

NPB statistics
- Batting average: .143
- Home runs: 0
- Runs batted in: 0
- Stats at Baseball Reference

Teams
- Milwaukee Brewers (1995–1997); Anaheim Angels (1999); Atlanta Braves (2000); Chunichi Dragons (2001)

Timothy Brian Unroe (born October 7, 1970) is an American former professional baseball first baseman. He is an alumnus of Lewis University.

== Career ==
Drafted by the Milwaukee Brewers in the 28th round of the 1992 Major League Baseball draft, Unroe made his Major League Baseball (MLB) debut with the Brewers on May 30, 1995, and appeared in his final MLB game on September 30, 2000. In 2001, he played in the Nippon Professional Baseball (NPB) for the Chunichi Dragons. He lives in Mesa, Arizona.
