= Jack Voigt =

American baseball player (born 1966)

- Outfielder
- Born: May 17, 1966 (age 60); Sarasota, Florida, U.S.
- Batted: Right Threw: Right

MLB debut
- August 3, 1992, for the Baltimore Orioles

Last MLB appearance
- July 27, 1998, for the Oakland Athletics

MLB statistics
- Batting average: .235
- Home runs: 20
- Runs batted in: 83
- Stats at Baseball Reference

Teams
- Baltimore Orioles (1992–1995); Texas Rangers (1995–1996); Milwaukee Brewers (1997); Oakland Athletics (1998)

John David Voigt (born May 17, 1966) is an American former professional baseball outfielder and the current hitting coach for the Las Vegas 51s. He played all or part of seven seasons in the majors, from 1992 until 1998, for the Baltimore Orioles, Texas Rangers, Milwaukee Brewers, and Oakland Athletics of Major League Baseball (MLB). He currently works in the New York Mets organization as their outfield/baserunning coordinator.

Since his playing career ended in 2000, Voigt has continued to work in minor league baseball as a coach, instructor, and manager. In 2002, he managed the Frederick Keys, a team in the Orioles farm system. He was originally hired by the Mets in 2006 as a scout. From 2007 until 2010, Voigt served as hitting coach for the New Orleans Zephyrs, Brooklyn Cyclones and Buffalo Bisons. He was named to the position of outfield/baserunning coordinator on February 21, 2011.

In September 2023, his daughter Noelia Voigt became the first Venezuelan-American woman to earn the title Miss Utah USA and eventually also Utah's first Miss USA winner since 1960.

Preceded by Dave Cash	Frederick Keys manager 2002	Succeeded by Tom Lawless
