= Ron Rightnowar =

American baseball player (born 1964)

- Pitcher
- Born: September 5, 1964 (age 61); Toledo, Ohio, U.S.
- Batted: Right Threw: Right

MLB debut
- May 20, 1995, for the Milwaukee Brewers

Last MLB appearance
- September 26, 1995, for the Milwaukee Brewers

MLB statistics
- Win–loss record: 2–1
- Earned run average: 5.40
- Strikeouts: 22
- Stats at Baseball Reference

Teams
- Milwaukee Brewers (1995)

Ronald Gene Rightnowar (born September 5, 1964) is an American former professional baseball pitcher. He played in Major League Baseball (MLB) for the Milwaukee Brewers during the 1995 season.

Rightnowar was the first replacement player during the 1994–95 MLB strike to subsequently play in the majors.

== Early life and education ==
Rightnowar graduated from Whitmer High School in Toledo, Ohio. He also attended and played baseball at Eastern Michigan University.

== Minor league career ==
After college, the Detroit Tigers signed Rightnowar as an amateur free agent on September 30, 1986. In 1987, he began his minor-league career by spending the entire season pitching for the Fayetteville Generals in the Class A South Atlantic League. He went 7–7 for Fayetteville (which was in its first season of existence), making 39 appearances, striking out 65, walking 37, saving 6 games and posting a 4.96 earned run average.

In 1988, Rightnowar was promoted to the Lakeland Flying Tigers in the High-A Florida State League, where he went 2–0 in 17 games with 32 strikeouts and just 11 walks in 49 1/3 innings pitched. Rightnowar also posted a 1.46 ERA.

In 1989, Rightnowar advanced to Double-A, pitching for the London Tigers and going 2–8 with a 5.00 ERA in 36 appearances. Rightnowar saved five games that season.

The following year, Rightnowar divided his time between three Detroit Tigers minor-league teams: London (2-2, 3.25 ERA, 33 strikeouts, 9 walks, 4 saves, 44 1/3 innings pitched and 23 games), the Class-A Niagara Falls Rapids (1-0, 0.00 ERA, 9 strikeouts, 1 walk, 7 innings pitched in just one appearance), and the Triple-A Toledo Mud Hens (4-5, 4.74 ERA, 28 strikeouts, 10 walks, 6 saves, 38 innings pitched in 28 games).

In 1991, Rightnowar divided his time between London (2-1, 3.91 ERA, 18 strikeouts, 8 walks, 3 saves, 25 1/3 innings pitched in 15 appearances) and Toledo (1-1, 3.94 ERA, 5 strikeouts, 15 walks, 3 saves, 29 2/3 innings pitched in 23 games). The following year, Rightnowar played solely for his hometown Mud Hens and continued his role as a middle reliever, posting a 3–2 record but a high 6.16 ERA. He pitched 57 innings in 34 games, picking up three saves, striking out 33 and walking 18.

In 1993, Rightnowar began the season with Toledo again, going 2–2 with a 3.55 ERA in 58-1/3 innings pitched. Appearing in 22 games, Rightnowar struck out 32, walked 19 and saved one game. On August 28, 1993, the Detroit Tigers traded Rightnowar to the Milwaukee Brewers for a player to be named later. With the trade, Rightnowar joined the Brewers' Triple-A New Orleans Zephyrs minor-league club for the remaining week of the minor-league season, pitching in four games and posting an 0–0 record with a 10.38 ERA. Rightnowar also struck out eight and walked two in 8-2/3 innings pitched.

In 1994, Rightnowar's pitching improved dramatically, as he played a full season for the Zephyrs. He went 8–2 with a 2.25 ERA in 51 games, pitching 88 innings, striking out 79, walking just 21 and saving 11 games. Rightnowar did not receive a September call-up, because major league players went on strike on August 12, 1994.

== Replacement player and MLB career (1995) ==
As the 1995 baseball season neared, Rightnowar said Brewers coaches asked if he would be interested in being a replacement player. "The major-league coaching staff made it clear that I needed to pitch," Rightnowar said later in 1995. "They said they needed to see me and see what I could offer the club."

The players strike ended before the 1995 MLB season began. Rightnowar pitched in spring training games, sufficient for the players union to classify Rightnowar and similar players as strike-breakers. After the strike, he was sent down to Triple-A New Orleans, where he started the season.

After Cal Eldred went on the disabled list, the Brewers promoted Rightnowar to the major leagues on May 19. He was to be the first replacement player to join the Brewers that season. Before he even threw a pitch, Rightnowar was given a frosty reception from the major-leaguers. "My first day, everyone was kind of cold toward me," Rightnowar said. "I understood. I respect their right to be angry. But then I called the leaders on the club and asked to speak to the team. I wanted to tell them my side of the story." Rightnowar's teammate Kevin Seitzer said Rightnowar regretted breaking the picket line.

Rightnowar later said he felt some bitterness about how his teammates responded to his choice during the strike. "It really stunk, to be honest with you," Rightnowar told the Toledo Blade in 2005. "From the time I was 8 or 9 years old, I had dreamed of what the day would be like if, and when, I ever made it to the big leagues. I figured it would be a real special day in my life, just like the day I got married. But I felt awful. They were all giving me the cold shoulder."

On May 20, Rightnowar made his major league debut, working 2 1/3 innings of scoreless relief against the Texas Rangers. On May 22, Rightnowar won his first big-league game against the Cleveland Indians, pitching two innings of relief and giving up one earned run. "That first major-league victory - man, what a great feeling!" Rightnowar said after the game. "This is really special."

Rightnowar stayed with the Brewers until August 5, when he was sent down to New Orleans. He finished his season with New Orleans with a 1–1 record and a 2.67 ERA. Rightnowar also struck out 22, walked 9, saved 10 games, and pitched in 30 1/3 innings in 25 games.

Rightnowar rejoined the Brewers on September 6, returning to the team's 40-man roster once New Orleans' season ended and MLB teams were able to expand their rosters. Rightnowar ended his Brewers season, and his major-league career, with a 2–1 record, a 5.40 ERA, 22 strikeouts, 18 walks, and one save in 36-2/3 innings pitched in 34 games. His one MLB save came on June 7. Rightnowar went 1 scoreless inning to close out a 6-3 Brewers win over the Twins.

== Retirement ==
On October 16, 1995, Rightnowar was granted free agency. No MLB teams showed an interest in Rightnowar after the 1995 season, so he retired.

In 1997, Rightnowar was hired as admissions director at Toledo Christian Schools. He also has co-owned a sports training center and coached a nine-team travel baseball league. He has worked as a bank loan officer in Ohio since 2011, according to his LinkedIn profile.
