= Jamie McAndrew =

American baseball player (born 1967)

- Pitcher
- Born: September 2, 1967 (age 58); Williamsport, Pennsylvania, U.S.
- Batted: Right Threw: Right

MLB debut
- July 17, 1995, for the Milwaukee Brewers

Last MLB appearance
- July 23, 1997, for the Milwaukee Brewers

MLB statistics
- Win–loss record: 3–4
- Earned run average: 5.98
- Strikeouts: 27
- Stats at Baseball Reference

Teams
- Milwaukee Brewers (1995, 1997)

James Brian McAndrew (born September 2, 1967) is an American former Major League Baseball pitcher who played for the Milwaukee Brewers in 1995 and 1997.

== Early years ==
McAndrew was born in Williamsport, Pennsylvania, the son of former Major League pitcher Jim McAndrew. He attended Ponderosa High School in Parker, Colorado, and played high school football and baseball for the Ponderosa Mustangs.

== College career ==
McAndrew attended the University of Florida in Gainesville, Florida, where he played for coach Joe Arnold's Florida Gators baseball team from 1987 to 1989. In 1987, he played collegiate summer baseball with the Hyannis Mets of the Cape Cod Baseball League. He was a member of the Gators' 1988 College World Series team, and was a second-team All-Southeastern Conference selection in 1989. He also was the starting punter for coach Galen Hall's Florida Gators football team in 1986 and 1987.

== Professional career ==
Drafted by the Los Angeles Dodgers in the first round of the 1989 Major League Baseball draft, McAndrew made his Major League Baseball debut with the Milwaukee Brewers on July 17, 1995, and appeared in his final game on July 23, 1997.

McAndrew was a replacement player for the Milwaukee Brewers during spring training prior to the 1995 season. Replacement players took over for professional baseball players when the Major League Baseball Players Association went on strike. The strike was resolved at the end of spring training.

== See also ==
- Florida Gators football, 1980–89
- List of Florida Gators baseball players
- List of second-generation Major League Baseball players
