= 1995 Toronto Blue Jays season =

1995 Toronto Blue Jays
- League: American League
- Division: East
- Ballpark: SkyDome
- City: Toronto
- Record: 56–88 (.389)
- Divisional place: 5th
- Owners: Interbrew, Canadian Imperial Bank of Commerce
- General managers: Gord Ash
- Managers: Cito Gaston
- Television: CBC Television (Brian Williams, Tommy Hutton); ONT (Don Chevrier, Tommy Hutton); The Sports Network (Dan Shulman, Buck Martinez)
- Radio: CJCL (AM) (Jerry Howarth, Tom Cheek)

The 1995 Toronto Blue Jays season was the franchise's 19th season of Major League Baseball. It resulted in the Blue Jays finishing fifth in the American League East with a record of 56 wins and 88 losses.

== Transactions ==
Transactions by the Toronto Blue Jays during the off-season before the 1995 season.

=== October 1994 ===
October 3	Randy St. Claire granted free agency (signed with Pittsburgh Pirates to a contract on December 6, 1994).
October 11	Released Dave Righetti.
October 14	Darnell Coles granted free agency (signed with St. Louis Cardinals to a one-year, $300,000 contract on March 9, 1995).
October 15	Ray Giannelli granted free agency (signed with St. Louis Cardinals to a contract on November 18, 1994). Joel Johnston granted free agency (signed with Boston Red Sox to a contract on December 16, 1994).
October 18	Todd Stottlemyre granted free agency (signed with Oakland Athletics to a one-year, $2.05 million contract on April 11, 1995).
October 20	Danny Cox granted free agency (signed with Toronto Blue Jays to a one-year, $700,000 contract on December 14, 1994). Dave Stewart granted free agency (signed with Oakland Athletics to a one-year, $1 million contract on April 8, 1995).
October 21	Pat Borders granted free agency (signed with Kansas City Royals to a one-year, $310,000 contract on April 10, 1995).
October 25	Dick Schofield granted free agency (signed with Los Angeles Dodgers to a one-year, $350,000 contract on April 15, 1995).

=== November 1994 ===
November 18	Traded Eddie Zosky to the Florida Marlins for a player to be named later (Scotty Pace on December 14, 1994).

=== December 1994 ===
December 5	Sent Rob Butler to the Philadelphia Phillies as part of a conditional deal. Freddy García selected by the Pittsburgh Pirates in the 1994 MLB Rule 5 draft. Todd Steverson selected by the Detroit Tigers in the 1994 MLB Rule 5 draft. Purchased the contract of Tomás Pérez from the California Angels.
December 14	Re-signed free agent Danny Cox to a one-year, $700,000 contract.
December 20	Signed free agent Dave Wainhouse to a contract.

=== January 1995 ===
January 18	Released Scott Bailes.

=== April 1995 ===
April 6	Acquired David Cone from the Kansas City Royals for Chris Stynes, Tony Medrano and Dave Sinnes.
April 10	Signed free agent Danny Darwin from the Boston Red Sox to a one-year, $300,000 contract.
April 14	Signed free agent Candy Maldonado from the Cleveland Indians to a one-year, $200,000 contract.
April 17	Signed free agent Paul Gibson from the Milwaukee Brewers to a contract.
April 22	Received Lance Parrish from the Kansas City Royals as part of a conditional deal.
April 24	Signed free agent Frank Viola from the Boston Red Sox to a contract.

== Regular season ==
=== Season standings ===
AL East
Team	W	L	Pct.	GB	Home	Road
Boston Red Sox	86	58	.597	—	42‍–‍30	44‍–‍28
New York Yankees	79	65	.549	7	46‍–‍26	33‍–‍39
Baltimore Orioles	71	73	.493	15	36‍–‍36	35‍–‍37
Detroit Tigers	60	84	.417	26	35‍–‍37	25‍–‍47
Toronto Blue Jays	56	88	.389	30	29‍–‍43	27‍–‍45

=== Record vs. opponents ===
1995 American League record Source: MLB Standings Grid – 1995
Team	BAL	BOS	CAL	CWS	CLE	DET	KC	MIL	MIN	NYY	OAK	SEA	TEX	TOR
Baltimore	—	4–9	9–4	6–1	2–10	8–5	4–5	7–5	3–6	6–7	5–7	6–7	4–1	7–6
Boston	9–4	—	11–3	5–3	6–7	8–5	3–2	8–4	5–4	5–8	8–4	7–5	3–4	8–5
California	4–9	3–11	—	10–2	3–2	6–2	5–7	5–2	8–5	7–5	6–7	7–6	6–7	8–2
Chicago	1–6	3–5	2–10	—	5–8	8–4	8–5	6–7	10–3	3–2–1	7–5	4–9	5–7	6–5
Cleveland	10–2	7–6	2–3	8–5	—	10–3	11–1	9–4	9–4	6–6	7–0	5–4	6–3	10–3
Detroit	5–8	5–8	2–6	4–8	3–10	—	3–4	8–5	7–5	5–8	2–3	5–5	4–8	7–6
Kansas City	5–4	2–3	7–5	5–8	1–11	4–3	—	10–2	6–7	3–7	5–8	7–5	8–6	7–5
Milwaukee	5–7	4–8	2–5	7–6	4–9	5–8	2–10	—	9–4	5–6	7–2	3–2	5–7	7–5
Minnesota	6–3	4–5	5–8	3–10	4–9	5–7	7–6	4–9	—	3–4	5–7	4–8	5–8	1–4
New York	7–6	8–5	5–7	2–3–1	6–6	8–5	7–3	6–5	4–3	—	4–9	4–9	6–3	12–1
Oakland	7–5	4–8	7–6	5–7	0–7	3–2	8–5	2–7	7–5	9–4	—	7–6	5–8	3–7
Seattle	7–6	5–7	6–7	9–4	4–5	5–5	5–7	2–3	8–4	9–4	6–7	—	10–3	3–4
Texas	1–4	4–3	7–6	7–5	3–6	8–4	6–8	7–5	8–5	3–6	8–5	3–10	—	9–3
Toronto	6–7	5–8	2–8	5–6	3–10	6–7	5–7	5–7	4–1	1–12	7–3	4–3	3–9	—

=== Transactions ===
Transactions for the Toronto Blue Jays during the 1995 regular season.

==== April 1995 ====
April 26	Traded Aaron Small to the Florida Marlins for a player to be named later (Ernie Delgado on September 19, 1995).

==== June 1995 ====
June 5	Released Dave Wainhouse.
June 9	Released Paul Gibson.

==== July 1995 ====
July 18	Released Danny Darwin.
July 25	Released Frank Viola.
July 28	Acquired Marty Janzen, Mike Gordon and Jason Jarvis from the New York Yankees for David Cone.

==== August 1995 ====
August 1	Signed free agent Wally Whitehurst from the Boston Red Sox to a contract.
August 31	Sent Candy Maldonado to the Texas Rangers as part of a conditional deal.

=== 1995 MLB draft ===
- June 1, 1995: 1995 Major League Baseball draft
  - Roy Halladay was drafted by the Blue Jays in the 1st round (17th pick). Player signed June 30, 1995.
  - Ryan Freel was drafted by the Blue Jays in the 10th round.

=== Roster ===
1995 Toronto Blue Jays
Roster
Pitchers: 38 Giovanni Carrara; 49 Tony Castillo; 11 David Cone; 22 Brad Cornett; 50 Danny Cox; 37 Tim Crabtree; 44 Danny Darwin; 66 Juan Guzmán; 36 Darren Hall; 41 Pat Hentgen; 32 Edwin Hurtado; 49 Ricardo Jordan; 28 Al Leiter; 55 Paul Menhart; 44 Kenny Robinson; 47 Jimmy Rogers; 40 Mike Timlin; 31 Duane Ward; 52 Jeff Ware; 54 Woody Williams	Catchers: 27 Randy Knorr; 53 Sandy Martínez; 13 Lance Parrish; Infielders: 12 Roberto Alomar; 14 Howard Battle; 20 Domingo Cedeño; 8 Alex Gonzalez; 9 John Olerud; 1 Tomás Pérez; 33 Ed Sprague	Outfielders: 29 Joe Carter; 6 Carlos Delgado; 15 Shawn Green; 26 Mike Huff; 23 Candy Maldonado; 17 Robert Pérez; 7 Shannon Stewart; 25 Devon White; Other batters: 19 Paul Molitor	Manager: 43 Cito Gaston; Coaches: 3 Bob Bailor (first base); 42 Galen Cisco (pitching); 39 Larry Hisle (hitting); 46 Dennis Holmberg (bullpen); 16 Nick Leyva (third base); 18 Gene Tenace (bench)

=== Game log ===
1995 Game Log
April: 3–2 (Home: 3–2; Away: 0–0)

#	Date	Opponent	Score	Win	Loss	Save	Attendance	Record
1	April 26	Athletics	13–1	Cone (1–0)	Stewart (0–1)		50,426	1–0
2	April 27	Athletics	7–1	Hentgen (1–0)	Darling (0–1)		31,070	2–0
3	April 28	Angels	7–6 (10)	Butcher (1–0)	Castillo (0–1)	Smith (1)	36,208	2–1
4	April 29	Angels	3–0	Leiter (1–0)	Sanderson (0–1)	Hall (1)	35,278	3–1
5	April 30	Angels	5–3	Butcher (2–0)	Menhart (0–1)	Smith (2)	35,290	3–2

May: 11–16 (Home: 7–8; Away: 4–8)

#	Date	Opponent	Score	Win	Loss	Save	Attendance	Record
6	May 1	Angels	2–0	Boskie (1–0)	Cone (1–1)	Smith (3)	31,303	3–3
7	May 2	White Sox	9–8	Timlin (1–0)	Márquez (0–1)		34,194	4–3
8	May 3	White Sox	8–7 (10)	Menhart (1–1)	Hernández (0–1)		33,159	5–3
9	May 5	@ Orioles	9–2	Brown (2–0)	Leiter (1–1)		37,670	5–4
10	May 6	@ Orioles	7–3	Darwin (1–0)	Rhodes (1–1)		40,173	6–4
11	May 7	@ Orioles	6–2	Mussina (1–1)	Cone (1–2)		44,304	6–5
12	May 9	Yankees	9–6	Hentgen (2–0)	McDowell (1–1)		37,291	7–5
13	May 10	Yankees	6–4 (11)	Wetteland (1–0)	Williams (0–1)		38,232	7–6
14	May 11	Yankees	12–11	Ausanio (2–0)	Ward (0–1)	Howe (1)	39,370	7–7
15	May 12	@ Brewers	14–5	Ignasiak (2–0)	Darwin (1–1)		12,904	7–8
16	May 13	@ Brewers	10–0	Cone (2–2)	Miranda (1–1)		17,984	8–8
17	May 14	@ Brewers	8–3	Hentgen (3–0)	Eldred (1–1)		13,447	9–8
18	May 15	@ Rangers	12–4	Tewksbury (2–1)	Guzmán (0–1)		17,982	9–9
19	May 16	@ Rangers	6–1	Rogers (3–2)	Leiter (1–2)	Burrows (1)	19,014	9–10
20	May 17	@ Rangers	12–7	Gross (1–3)	Darwin (1–2)	Vosberg (1)	18,910	9–11
21	May 19	@ Tigers	4–2	Cone (3–2)	Moore (3–2)		18,558	10–11
22	May 20	@ Tigers	10–6	Doherty (2–2)	Hentgen (3–1)		18,888	10–12
23	May 21	@ Tigers	2–1	Boever (2–0)	Cox (0–1)	Henneman (3)	19,144	10–13
24	May 22	Royals	7–0	Appier (5–1)	Darwin (1–3)		39,255	10–14
25	May 23	Royals	10–6	Timlin (2–0)	Pichardo (0–1)	Hall (2)	35,049	11–14
26	May 24	Royals	8–5	Gordon (2–1)	Cone (3–3)		37,277	11–15
27	May 26	Indians	7–4	Hershiser (3–1)	Hentgen (3–2)	Mesa (7)	47,113	11–16
28	May 27	Indians	3–0	Leiter (2–2)	Plunk (2–1)	Hall (3)	47,143	12–16
29	May 28	Indians	5–4	Nagy (3–1)	Darwin (1–4)	Mesa (8)	42,365	12–17
30	May 29	Tigers	5–4	Cone (4–3)	Moore (4–3)	Timlin (1)	39,294	13–17
31	May 30	Tigers	8–6	Lira (1–3)	Cox (0–2)	Henneman (5)	39,711	13–18
32	May 31	Tigers	5–3	Hentgen (4–2)	Doherty (2–3)		41,232	14–18

June: 9–16 (Home: 6–5; Away: 3–11)

#	Date	Opponent	Score	Win	Loss	Save	Attendance	Record
33	June 2	@ Indians	5–0	Leiter (3–2)	Nagy (3–2)	Timlin (2)	41,545	15–18
34	June 3	@ Indians	3–0	Martínez (5–0)	Darwin (1–5)		41,566	15–19
35	June 4	@ Indians	9–8	Tavárez (3–0)	Hall (0–1)		41,688	15–20
36	June 5	@ White Sox	3–2	Abbott (3–2)	Guzmán (0–2)	Hernández (9)	22,180	15–21
37	June 6	@ White Sox	6–4	Bere (2–4)	Hentgen (4–3)	Hernández (10)	18,428	15–22
38	June 7	@ White Sox	4–3	Leiter (4–2)	Keyser (0–1)	Timlin (3)	19,749	16–22
–	June 9	@ Royals	Postponed (rain) Rescheduled for September 4					
39	June 10	@ Royals	8–2	Appier (8–2)	Darwin (1–6)		20,883	16–23
40	June 11	@ Royals	3–2 (10)	Pichardo (3–1)	Hall (0–2)		16,881	16–24
41	June 12	Red Sox	4–3 (12)	Timlin (3–0)	Ryan (0–2)		40,171	17–24
42	June 13	Red Sox	11–7	Maddux (1–1)	Hentgen (4–4)		36,297	17–25
43	June 14	Red Sox	5–3	Leiter (5–2)	Wakefield (4–1)	Castillo (1)	37,898	18–25
44	June 16	Rangers	7–3	Tewksbury (5–2)	Darwin (1–7)		38,150	18–26
45	June 17	Rangers	4–3	Cone (5–3)	Rogers (7–3)		45,229	19–26
46	June 18	Rangers	7–2	Guzmán (1–2)	Pavlik (4–2)		40,215	20–26
47	June 20	Brewers	5–3	Roberson (3–2)	Hentgen (4–5)	Fetters (6)	39,456	20–27
48	June 21	Brewers	10–9	Wegman (1–3)	Timlin (3–1)	Fetters (7)	40,296	20–28
49	June 22	Brewers	9–0	Sparks (3–2)	Darwin (1–8)		43,490	20–29
50	June 23	@ Yankees	6–2	McDowell (4–4)	Cone (5–4)		24,499	20–30
51	June 24	@ Yankees	10–2	Pérez (5–4)	Guzmán (1–3)		28,950	20–31
52	June 25	@ Yankees	8–2	Hitchcock (3–4)	Hentgen (4–6)		26,340	20–32
53	June 26	@ Red Sox	4–3	Belinda (5–0)	Castillo (0–2)		26,716	20–33
54	June 27	@ Red Sox	6–5 (11)	Lilliquist (2–1)	Williams (0–2)		30,262	20–34
55	June 28	@ Red Sox	8–4	Cone (6–4)	Smith (2–4)		31,467	21–34
56	June 29	Orioles	5–1	Guzmán (2–3)	Fernandez (0–4)		40,173	22–34
57	June 30	Orioles	6–5	Cox (1–2)	Clark (0–1)		38,416	23–34

July: 15–14 (Home: 5–8; Away: 10–6)

#	Date	Opponent	Score	Win	Loss	Save	Attendance	Record
58	July 1	Orioles	6–2	Moyer (3–3)	Leiter (5–3)		43,375	23–35
59	July 2	Orioles	9–7	Benítez (1–3)	Crabtree (0–1)	Jones (12)	42,226	23–36
60	July 3	@ Angels	4–2	Langston (7–1)	Cone (6–5)	Smith (20)	17,848	23–37
61	July 4	@ Angels	14–0	Finley (7–6)	Guzmán (2–4)		61,292	23–38
62	July 5	@ Angels	6–5	Hentgen (5–6)	Boskie (6–2)	Castillo (2)	14,163	24–38
63	July 6	@ Angels	10–1	Anderson (2–2)	Leiter (5–4)		15,076	24–39
64	July 7	@ Athletics	4–2	Williams (1–2)	Prieto (0–1)	Castillo (3)	14,522	25–39
65	July 8	@ Athletics	9–6	Cone (7–5)	Harkey (4–6)			26–39
66	July 8	@ Athletics	6–3	Eckersley (2–2)	Guzmán (2–5)		25,103	26–40
67	July 9	@ Athletics	7–3	Hentgen (6–6)	Darling (2–4)		20,253	27–40
68	July 12	@ Athletics	7–4	Stottlemyre (8–2)	Leiter (5–5)	Eckersley (19)	11,343	27–41
69	July 13	@ Mariners	4–1	Cone (8–5)	Belcher (4–5)	Castillo (4)	18,616	28–41
70	July 14	@ Mariners	5–1	Guzmán (3–5)	Bosio (6–4)		14,850	29–41
71	July 15	@ Mariners	3–0	Johnson (10–1)	Hentgen (6–7)		36,037	29–42
72	July 16	@ Mariners	9–3	Hurtado (1–0)	Carmona (1–4)		17,632	30–42
73	July 17	@ Twins	6–3	Leiter (6–5)	Harris (0–3)	Castillo (5)	15,415	31–42
74	July 18	@ Twins	7–0	Cone (9–5)	Tapani (4–11)		16,534	32–42
75	July 19	Angels	10–2	Springer (1–2)	Guzmán (3–6)		39,139	32–43
76	July 20	Angels	10–3	Butcher (6–1)	Hentgen (6–8)		37,194	32–44
77	July 21	Mariners	4–3	Hurtado (2–0)	Torres (3–5)	Castillo (6)	36,490	33–44
78	July 22	Mariners	7–2	Belcher (6–5)	Leiter (6–6)		43,483	33–45
79	July 23	Mariners	6–4	Wells (3–3)	Cone (9–6)	Ayala (14)	39,163	33–46
80	July 25	Twins	7–3	Rodriguez (2–3)	Guzmán (3–7)		37,609	33–47
81	July 26	Twins	6–2	Hentgen (7–8)	Trombley (1–6)		37,150	34–47
82	July 27	Twins	9–2	Hurtado (3–0)	Harris (0–4)		42,154	35–47
83	July 28	Athletics	3–0	Leiter (7–6)	Van Poppel (1–3)	Castillo (7)	40,461	36–47
84	July 29	Athletics	18–11	Carrara (1–0)	Prieto (1–4)		41,040	37–47
85	July 30	Athletics	11–3	Darling (4–6)	Guzmán (3–8)		40,312	37–48
86	July 31	@ Orioles	6–3	Hentgen (8–8)	Moyer (6–4)	Jordan (1)	41,937	38–48

August: 11–16 (Home: 5–6; Away: 6–10)

#	Date	Opponent	Score	Win	Loss	Save	Attendance	Record
87	August 1	@ Orioles	12–10	Robinson (1–0)	Jones (0–4)	Castillo (8)	41,394	39–48
88	August 2	@ Orioles	1–0	Mussina (13–5)	Menhart (1–2)		40,023	39–49
89	August 3	@ Orioles	8–2 (10)	Jordan (1–0)	Clark (1–2)		43,325	40–49
90	August 4	Red Sox	7–1	Hanson (9–4)	Rogers (0–1)		40,137	40–50
91	August 5	Red Sox	9–3	Cormier (4–2)	Hentgen (8–9)		41,454	40–51
92	August 6	Red Sox	6–4	Eshelman (4–2)	Hurtado (3–1)	Aguilera (20)	38,194	40–52
93	August 7	Red Sox	5–4 (10)	Belinda (8–1)	Crabtree (0–2)		42,135	40–53
94	August 8	@ Brewers	6–5 (11)	Wegman (5–4)	Rogers (0–2)		18,222	40–54
95	August 9	@ Brewers	12–7	Karl (3–2)	Guzmán (3–9)		18,417	40–55
96	August 10	@ Brewers	8–4	Hentgen (9–9)	Sparks (7–6)	Castillo (9)	17,661	41–55
97	August 11	@ Rangers	14–5	Hurtado (4–1)	Pavlik (6–7)		31,269	42–55
98	August 12	@ Rangers	6–3	Witt (1–0)	Leiter (7–7)	McDowell (3)	40,040	42–56
99	August 13	@ Rangers	6–1	Gross (6–11)	Carrara (1–1)		25,308	42–57
100	August 15	@ Tigers	11–5	Bohanon (1–1)	Hentgen (9–10)		19,173	42–58
101	August 16	@ Tigers	7–4	Hurtado (5–1)	Maxcy (4–3)	Castillo (10)	17,551	43–58
102	August 17	@ Tigers	3–0	Leiter (8–7)	Lima (1–4)	Castillo (11)	14,629	44–58
103	August 18	Royals	10–3	Gordon (8–8)	Carrara (1–2)		41,168	44–59
104	August 19	Royals	5–4 (13)	Rogers (1–2)	Montgomery (1–2)		40,128	45–59
105	August 20	Royals	4–3	Timlin (4–1)	Olson (1–1)		39,103	46–59
106	August 21	Indians	7–3	Hershiser (11–5)	Hurtado (5–2)	Embree (1)	39,187	46–60
107	August 22	Indians	5–4	Castillo (1–2)	Tavárez (8–2)		39,293	47–60
108	August 23	Indians	6–5	Poole (3–3)	Carrara (1–3)	Mesa (38)	41,169	47–61
109	August 25	White Sox	8–7	Bere (6–11)	Hentgen (9–11)	Hernández (22)	38,684	47–62
110	August 26	White Sox	3–2	Rogers (2–2)	Hernández (2–7)		45,624	48–62
111	August 27	White Sox	2–1	Leiter (9–7)	Righetti (3–2)	Castillo (12)	40,179	49–62
112	August 28	@ Indians	9–1	Ogea (7–3)	Carrara (1–4)		40,283	49–63
113	August 29	@ Indians	4–1	Clark (8–5)	Guzmán (3–10)		41,257	49–64
114	August 30	@ Indians	4–3 (14)	Assenmacher (6–2)	Castillo (1–3)		41,807	49–65
115	August 31	@ Indians	6–4 (10)	Mesa (2–0)	Rogers (2–3)		41,746	49–66

September: 7–21 (Home: 3–11; Away: 4–10)

#	Date	Opponent	Score	Win	Loss	Save	Attendance	Record
116	September 1	@ White Sox	5–3	Keyser (4–6)	Leiter (9–8)	Hernández (25)	18,444	49–67
117	September 2	@ White Sox	10–4	Álvarez (7–7)	Ware (0–1)		24,369	49–68
118	September 3	@ White Sox	6–5	Simas (1–0)	Guzmán (3–11)	Hernández (26)	23,428	49–69
119	September 4	@ Royals	6–1	Hentgen (10–11)	Gubicza (10–12)	Timlin (4)		50–69
120	September 4	@ Royals	9–7	Magnante (1–1)	Castillo (1–4)	Montgomery (27)	19,905	50–70
121	September 5	@ Royals	9–8 (10)	Olson (3–1)	Robinson (1–1)		12,443	50–71
122	September 6	@ Royals	6–2	Leiter (10–8)	Gordon (10–10)		13,030	51–71
123	September 8	Tigers	9–5	Ware (1–1)	Lira (9–10)		36,490	52–71
124	September 9	Tigers	5–2	Bergman (7–8)	Guzmán (3–12)	Henry (2)	43,127	52–72
125	September 10	Tigers	5–2 (11)	Doherty (5–8)	Timlin (4–2)	Henry (3)	39,255	52–73
126	September 11	Tigers	3–2 (10)	Christopher (3–0)	Rogers (2–4)	Bohanon (1)	32,135	52–74
127	September 12	Rangers	6–5	McDowell (6–3)	Leiter (10–9)	Russell (19)	32,178	52–75
128	September 13	Rangers	3–2 (11)	Whiteside (5–4)	Timlin (4–3)		32,130	52–76
129	September 14	Rangers	6–1	Witt (3–2)	Guzmán (3–13)		32,143	52–77
130	September 15	Brewers	5–1 (15)	Kiefer (4–1)	Robinson (1–2)		34,164	52–78
131	September 16	Brewers	5–4 (11)	Carrara (2–4)	Wegman (5–7)		43,164	53–78
132	September 17	Brewers	5–0	Leiter (11–9)	Givens (5–5)		38,191	54–78
133	September 18	@ Yankees	9–2	Cone (16–8)	Cox (1–3)		15,224	54–79
134	September 19	@ Yankees	5–3	Pettitte (11–8)	Guzmán (3–14)	Wetteland (26)	15,772	54–80
135	September 20	@ Yankees	2–1	Hitchcock (9–10)	Hentgen (10–12)		20,541	54–81
136	September 21	@ Yankees	6–4	Howe (6–3)	Menhart (1–3)	Wetteland (27)	17,766	54–82
–	September 22	@ Red Sox	Postponed (rain) Rescheduled for September 23					
137	September 23	@ Red Sox	5–0	Clemens (9–5)	Leiter (11–10)		32,791	54–83
138	September 23	@ Red Sox	8–6	Ware (2–1)	Wakefield (16–6)	Castillo (13)	21,266	55–83
139	September 24	@ Red Sox	2–1	Guzmán (4–14)	Aguilera (3–3)	Timlin (5)	32,472	56–83
140	September 26	Orioles	5–0	Mussina (18–9)	Hentgen (10–13)		35,414	56–84
141	September 27	Orioles	7–0	Erickson (13–10)	Menhart (1–4)		35,019	56–85
142	September 29	Yankees	4–3	Pettitte (12–9)	Castillo (1–5)	Wetteland (31)	40,318	56–86
143	September 30	Yankees	6–1	Kamieniecki (7–6)	Leiter (11–11)		49,233	56–87

October: 0–1 (Home: 0–1; Away: 0–0)

#	Date	Opponent	Score	Win	Loss	Save	Attendance	Record
144	October 1	Yankees	6–1	Hitchcock (11–10)	Hentgen (10–14)		47,182	56–88

*An MLB Players strike, which ended on April 2, resulted in a reduced schedule of 144 games being played in 1995.

== Player stats ==
= Indicates team leader

=== Batting ===
==== Starters by position ====
Note: Pos = Position; G = Games played; AB = At bats; H = Hits; Avg. = Batting average; HR = Home runs; RBI = Runs batted in

Pos	Player	G	AB	H	Avg.	HR	RBI
C	Sandy Martínez	62	191	46	.241	2	25
1B	John Olerud	135	492	143	.291	8	54
2B	Roberto Alomar	130	517	155	.300	13	66
SS	Alex Gonzalez	111	367	89	.243	10	42
3B	Ed Sprague Jr.	144	521	127	.244	18	74
LF	Joe Carter	139	558	141	.253	25	76
CF	Devon White	101	427	121	.283	10	53
RF	Shawn Green	121	379	109	.288	15	54
DH	Paul Molitor	130	525	142	.270	15	60

==== Other batters ====
Note: Pos = Position; G = Games played; AB = At bats; H = Hits; Avg. = Batting average; HR = Home runs; RBI = Runs batted in

Pos	Player	G	AB	H	Avg.	HR	RBI
C	Lance Parrish	70	178	36	.202	4	22
IF	Domingo Cedeño	51	161	38	.236	4	14
OF	Candy Maldonado	61	160	43	.269	7	25
CF	Mike Huff	61	138	32	.232	1	9
C	Randy Knorr	45	132	28	.212	3	16
UT	Carlos Delgado	37	99	15	.165	3	11
SS	Tomás Pérez	41	98	24	.245	1	8
OF	Robert Pérez	17	48	9	.188	1	3
OF	Shannon Stewart	12	38	8	.211	0	1
UT	Howard Battle	9	15	3	.200	0	0

=== Pitching ===
==== Starting and other pitchers ====
Note: G = Games pitched; IP = Innings pitched; W = Wins; L = Losses; ERA = Earned run average; SO = Strikeouts

Player	G	IP	W	L	ERA	SO
Pat Hentgen	30	200.2	10	14	5.11	135
Al Leiter	28	183.0	11	11	3.64	153
Juan Guzmán	24	135.1	4	14	6.32	94
David Cone	17	130.1	9	6	3.38	102
Paul Menhart	21	78.2	1	4	4.92	50
Edwin Hurtado	14	77.2	5	2	5.45	33
Danny Darwin	13	65.0	1	8	7.62	36
Giovanni Carrara	12	48.2	2	4	7.21	27
Jeff Ware	5	26.1	2	1	5.47	18

==== Relief pitchers ====
Note: G = Games pitched; W = Wins; L = Losses; SV = Saves; ERA = Earned run average; SO = Strikeouts

Player	G	W	L	SV	ERA	SO
Tony Castillo	55	1	5	13	3.22	38
Mike Timlin	31	4	3	5	2.14	36
Tim Crabtree	31	0	2	0	3.09	21
Danny Cox	24	1	4	0	7.40	38
Woody Williams	23	1	2	0	3.69	41
Ken Robinson	21	1	2	0	3.69	31
Jimmy Rogers	19	2	4	0	5.70	13
Darren Hall	17	0	2	3	4.41	11
Ricardo Jordan	15	1	0	1	6.60	10
Brad Cornett	5	0	0	0	9.00	4
Duane Ward	4	0	1	0	27.00	3

== Award winners ==
- Roberto Alomar, Gold Glove Award
- Devon White, Gold Glove Award

All-Star Game

- Roberto Alomar, 2B

== Farm system ==
Level	Team	League	Manager
AAA	Syracuse Chiefs	International League	Bob Didier and Richie Hebner
AA	Knoxville Smokies	Southern League	Garth Iorg
A	Dunedin Blue Jays	Florida State League	Jim Nettles
A	Hagerstown Suns	South Atlantic League	Omar Malavé
A-Short Season	St. Catharines Blue Jays	New York–Penn League	J. J. Cannon
Rookie	GCL Blue Jays	Gulf Coast League	Rocket Wheeler
Rookie	Medicine Hat Blue Jays	Pioneer League	Darren Balsley
