= 1995 Oakland Athletics season =

1995 Oakland Athletics
- League: American League
- Division: West
- Ballpark: Oakland–Alameda County Coliseum
- City: Oakland, California
- Record: 67–77 (.465)
- Divisional place: 4th
- Owners: Stephen Schott; Kenneth Hofmann
- General managers: Sandy Alderson
- Managers: Tony La Russa
- Television: KRON-TV/KBHK-TV (Dick Stockton, Joe Morgan); Sports Channel Pacific (Ray Fosse, Greg Papa)
- Radio: KNEW (Bill King, Lon Simmons, Ray Fosse)

The Oakland Athletics' 1995 season was the team's 28th in Oakland, California. It was also the 95th season in franchise history. The team finished fourth in the American League West with a record of 67–77.

The Athletics, for a third consecutive year, found themselves mired in mediocrity. As had been the case in both 1993 and 1994, an average-to-poor offense (headlined by Mark McGwire, Rickey Henderson, and Rubén Sierra) was sabotaged by one of the league's worst pitching staffs. For a third consecutive season, no Athletics starter posted an earned run average (ERA) of less than 4.50; only one such starter, Todd Stottlemyre, managed to record double-digit wins in the strike-shortened campaign.

The Athletics, despite their weak pitching, managed to contend in the first half of the season. On July 1, a win over the division-leading California Angels brought them within 1.5 games of first place; it also ran their record to a surprising 34–28. As had been the case in 1994, the A's followed their surprising start with a prolonged slump; between July 2 and August 15, the team went only 13–28. The collapse, along with an Angels surge (the Angels went 30–11 over the same span) left the A's 17.5 games out of first place. As had also been the case in 1994, Oakland mounted a dramatic comeback; an Angels collapse, combined with a surge of their own, allowed them to pull within five games of first place on September 20. The September 20th victory would be their last, as Oakland lost each of the regular season's final nine games. They finished the campaign eleven games behind the AL West champion Seattle Mariners.

The Athletics' on-field mediocrity, however, contained a few bright spots. Mark McGwire clubbed 39 home runs in a mere 104 games; he would hit at least 50 in each of the four subsequent seasons. The 1995 season also saw the debut of future superstar Jason Giambi. Giambi, in his first major league season, batted .256 with six home runs in 54 games. Lastly, the season was Tony La Russa's last as Oakland's manager. He, along with most of the Athletics' assistant coaches, would join the St. Louis Cardinals in 1996.

== Offseason ==
- November 8, 1994: José Ortiz was signed as an amateur free agent by the Athletics.

== Regular season ==
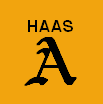
Walter A.
Haas
Owner:
1981-95(OAK)

Honored 1995

=== Season standings ===
AL West
Team	W	L	Pct.	GB	Home	Road
Seattle Mariners	79	66	.545	—	46‍–‍27	33‍–‍39
California Angels	78	67	.538	1	39‍–‍33	39‍–‍34
Texas Rangers	74	70	.514	4½	41‍–‍31	33‍–‍39
Oakland Athletics	67	77	.465	11½	38‍–‍34	29‍–‍43

=== Record vs. opponents ===
1995 American League record Source: MLB Standings Grid – 1995
Team	BAL	BOS	CAL	CWS	CLE	DET	KC	MIL	MIN	NYY	OAK	SEA	TEX	TOR
Baltimore	—	4–9	9–4	6–1	2–10	8–5	4–5	7–5	3–6	6–7	5–7	6–7	4–1	7–6
Boston	9–4	—	11–3	5–3	6–7	8–5	3–2	8–4	5–4	5–8	8–4	7–5	3–4	8–5
California	4–9	3–11	—	10–2	3–2	6–2	5–7	5–2	8–5	7–5	6–7	7–6	6–7	8–2
Chicago	1–6	3–5	2–10	—	5–8	8–4	8–5	6–7	10–3	3–2–1	7–5	4–9	5–7	6–5
Cleveland	10–2	7–6	2–3	8–5	—	10–3	11–1	9–4	9–4	6–6	7–0	5–4	6–3	10–3
Detroit	5–8	5–8	2–6	4–8	3–10	—	3–4	8–5	7–5	5–8	2–3	5–5	4–8	7–6
Kansas City	5–4	2–3	7–5	5–8	1–11	4–3	—	10–2	6–7	3–7	5–8	7–5	8–6	7–5
Milwaukee	5–7	4–8	2–5	7–6	4–9	5–8	2–10	—	9–4	5–6	7–2	3–2	5–7	7–5
Minnesota	6–3	4–5	5–8	3–10	4–9	5–7	7–6	4–9	—	3–4	5–7	4–8	5–8	1–4
New York	7–6	8–5	5–7	2–3–1	6–6	8–5	7–3	6–5	4–3	—	4–9	4–9	6–3	12–1
Oakland	7–5	4–8	7–6	5–7	0–7	3–2	8–5	2–7	7–5	9–4	—	7–6	5–8	3–7
Seattle	7–6	5–7	6–7	9–4	4–5	5–5	5–7	2–3	8–4	9–4	6–7	—	10–3	3–4
Texas	1–4	4–3	7–6	7–5	3–6	8–4	6–8	7–5	8–5	3–6	8–5	3–10	—	9–3
Toronto	6–7	5–8	2–8	5–6	3–10	6–7	5–7	5–7	4–1	1–12	7–3	4–3	3–9	—

=== Notable transactions ===
- April 8, 1995: Dave Stewart was signed as a free agent by the Athletics.
- April 11, 1995: Todd Stottlemyre was signed as a free agent by the Athletics.
- April 12, 1995: Mike Gallego was signed as a free agent by the Athletics.
- April 20, 1995: Brian Harper was signed as a free agent by the Athletics.
- June 1, 1995: Mark Bellhorn was drafted by the Athletics in the 2nd round of the 1995 Major League Baseball draft. Player signed June 24, 1995.
- July 28, 1995: Rubén Sierra and Jason Beverlin were traded by the Athletics to the New York Yankees for Danny Tartabull.
- August 21, 1995: Ron Darling was released by the Athletics.

=== Roster ===
1995 Oakland Athletics
Roster
Pitchers: 55 Mark Acre; 38 Scott Baker; 53 John Briscoe; 41 Jim Corsi; 17 Ron Darling; 43 Dennis Eckersley; 26 Chris Eddy; 52 Ramón Fermín; 19 Mike Harkey; 40 Rick Honeycutt; 51 Doug Johns; 52 Dave Leiper; 58 Mike Mohler; 50 Steve Ontiveros; 38 Steve Phoenix; 48 Ariel Prieto; 37 Carlos Reyes; 35,48 Dave Stewart; 30 Todd Stottlemyre; 59 Todd Van Poppel; 31 John Wasdin; 56 Don Wengert; 39 Steve Wojciechowski	Catchers: 12 Brian Harper; 6 Eric Helfand; 36 Terry Steinbach; 19 George Williams; Infielders: 23 Mike Aldrete; 14 Mike Bordick; 7 Scott Brosius; 48 Fausto Cruz; 2 Mike Gallego; 13 Brent Gates; 16 Jason Giambi; 25 Mark McGwire; 3 Craig Paquette	Outfielders: 29 Gerónimo Berroa; 24 Rickey Henderson; 44 José Herrera; 28 Stan Javier; 29 Rubén Sierra; 45 Danny Tartabull; 33 Andy Tomberlin; 9 Ernie Young	Manager: 10 Tony La Russa; Coaches: 18 Dave Duncan (Pitching); 5 Art Kusnyer (Bullpen); 4 Carney Lansford (Bench); 11 Jim Lefebvre (Hitting); 8 Dave McKay (First Base); 15 Tommie Reynolds (Third Base)

== Player stats ==
=== Batting ===
==== Starters by position ====
Note: Pos = Position; G = Games played; AB = At bats; H = Hits; Avg. = Batting average; HR = Home runs; RBI = Runs batted in

Pos	Player	G	AB	H	Avg.	HR	RBI
C	Terry Steinbach	114	406	113	.278	15	65
1B	Mark McGwire	104	317	87	.274	39	90
2B	Brent Gates	136	524	133	.254	5	56
SS	Mike Bordick	126	428	113	.264	8	44
3B	Craig Paquette	105	283	64	.226	13	49
LF	Rickey Henderson	112	407	122	.300	9	54
CF	Stan Javier	130	442	123	.278	8	56
RF	Rubén Sierra	70	264	70	.265	12	42
DH	Gerónimo Berroa	141	546	152	.278	22	88

==== Other batters ====
Note: G = Games played; AB = At bats; H = Hits; Avg. = Batting average; HR = Home runs; RBI = Runs batted in

Player	G	AB	H	Avg.	HR	RBI
Scott Brosius	123	389	102	.262	17	46
Jason Giambi	54	176	45	.256	6	25
Mike Aldrete	60	125	34	.272	4	21
Mike Gallego	43	120	28	.233	0	8
Danny Tartabull	24	88	23	.261	2	7
Eric Helfand	38	86	14	.163	0	7
Andy Tomberlin	46	85	18	.212	4	10
George Williams	29	79	23	.291	3	14
José Herrera	33	70	17	.243	0	2
Ernie Young	26	50	10	.200	2	5
Fausto Cruz	8	23	5	.217	0	5
Brian Harper	2	7	0	.000	0	0

=== Pitching ===
==== Starting pitchers ====
Note: G = Games pitched; IP = Innings pitched; W = Wins; L = Losses; ERA = Earned run average; SO = Strikeouts

Player	G	IP	W	L	ERA	SO
Todd Stottlemyre	31	209.2	14	7	4.55	205
Steve Ontiveros	22	129.2	9	6	4.37	77
Ron Darling	21	104.0	4	7	6.23	69
Dave Stewart	16	81.0	3	7	6.89	58
Mike Harkey	14	66.0	4	6	6.27	28
Doug Johns	11	54.2	5	3	4.61	25

==== Other pitchers ====
Note: G = Games pitched; IP = Innings pitched; W = Wins; L = Losses; ERA = Earned run average; SO = Strikeouts

Player	G	IP	W	L	ERA	SO
Todd Van Poppel	36	138.1	4	8	4.88	122
Ariel Prieto	14	58.0	2	6	4.97	37
Steve Wojciechowski	14	48.2	2	3	5.18	13
John Wasdin	5	17.1	1	1	4.67	6

==== Relief pitchers ====
Note: G = Games pitched; W = Wins; L = Losses; SV = Saves; ERA = Earned run average; SO = Strikeouts

Player	G	W	L	SV	ERA	SO
Dennis Eckersley	52	4	6	29	4.83	40
Rick Honeycutt	49	5	1	2	2.42	21
Mark Acre	43	1	2	0	5.71	47
Carlos Reyes	40	4	6	0	5.09	48
Jim Corsi	38	2	4	2	2.20	26
Mike Mohler	28	1	1	1	3.04	15
Dave Leiper	24	1	1	0	3.57	10
Don Wengert	19	1	1	0	3.34	16
John Briscoe	16	0	1	0	8.35	19
Chris Eddy	6	0	0	0	7.36	2
Scott Baker	1	0	0	0	9.82	3
Steve Phoenix	1	0	0	0	32.40	3
Ramón Fermín	1	0	0	0	13.50	0

== Awards and records ==
- Mark McGwire, Major League Record, Most Home Runs in a season in under 350 At-Bats (39)

== Farm system ==
Level	Team	League	Manager
AAA	Edmonton Trappers	Pacific Coast League	Gary Jones
AA	Huntsville Stars	Southern League	Dick Scott
A	Modesto A's	California League	Glenn Ezell
A	West Michigan Whitecaps	Midwest League	Jim Colborn
A-Short Season	Southern Oregon A's	Northwest League	Tony DeFrancesco
Rookie	AZL Athletics	Arizona League	Juan Navarrette

LEAGUE CHAMPIONS: AZL Athletics
