= 1995 Kansas City Royals season =

Coordinates: 39°3′6.1″N 94°28′49.1″W

1995 Kansas City Royals
- League: American League
- Division: Central
- Ballpark: Kauffman Stadium
- City: Kansas City, Missouri
- Record: 70–74 (.486)
- Divisional place: 2nd
- Owners: David Glass
- General managers: Herk Robinson
- Managers: Bob Boone
- Television: KSMO-TV (Paul Splittorff, Dave Armstrong)
- Radio: WIBW (AM) (Denny Matthews, Fred White)

The 1995 Kansas City Royals season was the 27th season for the franchise, and their 23rd at Kauffman Stadium. During this season, the Royals finished second in the American League Central, with a record of 70 wins and 74 losses. This was the first of 17 losing seasons the Royals would suffer through 2012.

Although the 1995 Royals had a losing record and finished 30 games behind the Cleveland Indians, the second-place division finish in 1995 was the highest finish for the franchise in the American League Central from 1994, when the Royals joined that division, until the 2014 team also finished second and the 2015 team won the franchise's first Central Division championship.

== Regular season ==
=== Season standings ===
AL Central
Team	W	L	Pct.	GB	Home	Road
Cleveland Indians	100	44	.694	—	54‍–‍18	46‍–‍26
Kansas City Royals	70	74	.486	30	35‍–‍37	35‍–‍37
Chicago White Sox	68	76	.472	32	38‍–‍34	30‍–‍42
Milwaukee Brewers	65	79	.451	35	33‍–‍39	32‍–‍40
Minnesota Twins	56	88	.389	44	29‍–‍43	27‍–‍45

=== Record vs. opponents ===
1995 American League record Source: MLB Standings Grid – 1995
Team	BAL	BOS	CAL	CWS	CLE	DET	KC	MIL	MIN	NYY	OAK	SEA	TEX	TOR
Baltimore	—	4–9	9–4	6–1	2–10	8–5	4–5	7–5	3–6	6–7	5–7	6–7	4–1	7–6
Boston	9–4	—	11–3	5–3	6–7	8–5	3–2	8–4	5–4	5–8	8–4	7–5	3–4	8–5
California	4–9	3–11	—	10–2	3–2	6–2	5–7	5–2	8–5	7–5	6–7	7–6	6–7	8–2
Chicago	1–6	3–5	2–10	—	5–8	8–4	8–5	6–7	10–3	3–2–1	7–5	4–9	5–7	6–5
Cleveland	10–2	7–6	2–3	8–5	—	10–3	11–1	9–4	9–4	6–6	7–0	5–4	6–3	10–3
Detroit	5–8	5–8	2–6	4–8	3–10	—	3–4	8–5	7–5	5–8	2–3	5–5	4–8	7–6
Kansas City	5–4	2–3	7–5	5–8	1–11	4–3	—	10–2	6–7	3–7	5–8	7–5	8–6	7–5
Milwaukee	5–7	4–8	2–5	7–6	4–9	5–8	2–10	—	9–4	5–6	7–2	3–2	5–7	7–5
Minnesota	6–3	4–5	5–8	3–10	4–9	5–7	7–6	4–9	—	3–4	5–7	4–8	5–8	1–4
New York	7–6	8–5	5–7	2–3–1	6–6	8–5	7–3	6–5	4–3	—	4–9	4–9	6–3	12–1
Oakland	7–5	4–8	7–6	5–7	0–7	3–2	8–5	2–7	7–5	9–4	—	7–6	5–8	3–7
Seattle	7–6	5–7	6–7	9–4	4–5	5–5	5–7	2–3	8–4	9–4	6–7	—	10–3	3–4
Texas	1–4	4–3	7–6	7–5	3–6	8–4	6–8	7–5	8–5	3–6	8–5	3–10	—	9–3
Toronto	6–7	5–8	2–8	5–6	3–10	6–7	5–7	5–7	4–1	1–12	7–3	4–3	3–9	—

=== Notable transactions ===
- April 5, 1995: Brian McRae was traded by the Kansas City Royals to the Chicago Cubs for Derek Wallace and Geno Morones (minors).
- April 6, 1995: David Cone was traded by the Kansas City Royals to the Toronto Blue Jays for Chris Stynes, David Sinnes (minors), and Tony Medrano (minors).
- April 19, 1995: Félix José was signed as a free agent with the Kansas City Royals.
- April 25, 1995: Doug Linton was signed as a free agent with the Kansas City Royals.
- April 26, 1995: Vince Coleman signed as a free agent with the Kansas City Royals.
- May 14, 1995: Félix José was released by the Kansas City Royals.
- June 29, 1995: Kevin Elster was signed as a free agent with the Kansas City Royals.
- July 3, 1995: Kevin Elster was released by the Kansas City Royals.
- August 15, 1995: Vince Coleman was traded by the Kansas City Royals to the Seattle Mariners for a player to be named later. The Seattle Mariners sent Jim Converse (August 18, 1995) to the Kansas City Royals to complete the trade.
- September 8, 1995: Juan Samuel was traded by the Detroit Tigers to the Kansas City Royals for a player to be named later. The Kansas City Royals sent Phil Hiatt (September 14, 1995) to the Detroit Tigers to complete the trade.

=== Roster ===
1995 Kansas City Royals
Roster
Pitchers: 37 Scott Anderson; 55 Kevin Appier; 41 Billy Brewer; 32 Tom Browning; 50 Melvin Bunch; 53 Jim Converse; 47 Dave Fleming; 36 Tom Gordon; 23 Mark Gubicza; 33 Chris Haney; 37 Rick Huisman; 45 Jason Jacome; 49 Doug Linton; 57 Mike Magnante; 28 Rusty Meacham; 21 Jeff Montgomery; 30 Gregg Olson; 35 Hipólito Pichardo; 51 Jim Pittsley; 37 Dennis Rasmussen; 52 Dilson Torres	Catchers: 15 Pat Borders; 24 Brent Mayne; 15 Henry Mercedes; 29 Mike Sweeney; Infielders: 46 Edgar Cáceres; 8 Gary Gaetti; 7 Greg Gagne; 14 Jeff Grotewold; 3 Bob Hamelin; 6 David Howard; 12 Wally Joyner; 13 José Lind; 43 Keith Lockhart; 37 Russ McGinnis; 40 José Mota; 18 Joe Randa; 38 Chris Stynes; 44 Joe Vitiello	Outfielders: 29 Vince Coleman; 48 Brent Cookson; 51 Johnny Damon; 42 Tom Goodwin; 25 Phil Hiatt; 26 Chris James; 34 Félix José; 16 Keith Miller; 16 Les Norman; 22 Jon Nunnally; 27 Juan Samuel; 31 Michael Tucker	Manager: 2 Bob Boone; Coaches: 38 Jeff Cox (third base); 42 Bruce Kison (pitching); 19 Greg Luzinski (first base); 39 Mitchell Page (hitting); 9 Jamie Quirk (bullpen); -- Gene Mauch (bench)

== Player stats ==
=== Batting ===
==== Starters by position ====
Note: Pos = Position; G = Games played; AB = At bats; H = Hits; Avg. = Batting average; HR = Home runs; RBI = Runs batted in

Pos	Player	G	AB	H	Avg.	HR	RBI
C	Brent Mayne	110	307	77	.251	1	27
1B	Wally Joyner	131	465	144	.310	12	83
2B	Keith Lockhart	94	274	88	.321	6	33
SS	Greg Gagne	120	430	110	.256	6	49
3B	Gary Gaetti	137	514	134	.261	35	96
LF	Vince Coleman	75	293	84	.287	4	20
CF	Tom Goodwin	133	480	138	.288	4	28
RF	Jon Nunnally	119	303	74	.244	14	42
DH	Bob Hamelin	72	208	35	.168	7	25

==== Other batters ====
Note: G = Games played; AB = At bats; H = Hits; Avg. = Batting average; HR = Home runs; RBI = Runs batted in

Player	G	AB	H	Avg.	HR	RBI
David Howard	95	255	62	.243	0	19
Johnny Damon	47	188	53	.282	3	23
Michael Tucker	62	177	46	.260	4	17
Pat Borders	52	143	33	.231	4	13
Joe Vitiello	53	130	33	.254	7	21
Edgar Cáceres	55	117	28	.239	1	17
Phil Hiatt	52	113	23	.204	4	12
José Lind	29	97	26	.268	0	6
Joe Randa	34	70	12	.171	1	5
Chris James	26	58	18	.310	2	7
Henry Mercedes	23	43	11	.256	0	9
Les Norman	24	40	9	.225	0	4
Jeff Grotewold	15	36	10	.278	1	6
Chris Stynes	22	35	6	.171	0	2
Brent Cookson	22	35	5	.143	0	5
Juan Samuel	15	34	6	.176	2	5
Félix José	9	30	4	.133	0	1
Keith Miller	9	15	5	.333	1	3
Russ McGinnis	3	5	0	.000	0	0
Mike Sweeney	4	4	1	.250	0	0
José Mota	2	2	0	.000	0	0

=== Pitching ===
==== Starting pitchers ====
Note: G = Games pitched; IP = Innings pitched; W = Wins; L = Losses; ERA = Earned run average; SO = Strikeouts

Player	G	IP	W	L	ERA	SO
Mark Gubicza	33	213.1	12	14	3.75	81
Kevin Appier	31	201.1	15	10	3.89	185
Tom Gordon	31	189.0	12	12	4.43	119
Jason Jacome	15	84.0	4	6	5.36	39
Chris Haney	16	81.1	3	4	3.65	31
Tom Browning	2	10.0	0	2	8.10	3
Jim Pittsley	1	3.1	0	0	13.50	0

==== Other pitchers ====
Note: G = Games pitched; IP = Innings pitched; W = Wins; L = Losses; ERA = Earned run average; SO = Strikeouts

Player	G	IP	W	L	ERA	SO
Melvin Bunch	13	40.0	1	3	5.63	19
Dave Fleming	9	32.0	0	1	3.66	14
Scott Anderson	6	25.1	1	0	5.33	6
Doug Linton	7	22.1	0	1	7.25	13
Dennis Rasmussen	5	10.0	0	1	9.00	6

==== Relief pitchers ====
Note: G = Games pitched; W = Wins; L = Losses; SV = Saves; ERA = Earned run average; SO = Strikeouts

Player	G	W	L	SV	ERA	SO
Jeff Montgomery	54	2	3	31	3.43	49
Rusty Meacham	49	4	3	2	4.98	30
Billy Brewer	48	2	4	0	5.56	31
Hipólito Pichardo	44	8	4	1	4.36	43
Mike Magnante	28	1	1	0	4.23	28
Dilson Torres	24	1	2	0	6.09	28
Gregg Olson	20	3	3	3	3.26	21
Jim Converse	9	1	0	0	5.84	5
Rick Huisman	7	0	0	0	7.45	12

== Farm system ==
Level	Team	League	Manager
AAA	Omaha Royals	American Association	Mike Jirschele
AA	Wichita Wranglers	Texas League	Ron Johnson
A	Wilmington Blue Rocks	Carolina League	John Mizerock
A	Springfield Sultans	Midwest League	Brian Poldberg
A-Short Season	Spokane Indians	Northwest League	Al Pedrique
Rookie	GCL Royals	Gulf Coast League	Bob Herold

LEAGUE CHAMPIONS: GCL Royals
