= Paul Menhart =

American baseball player and coach (born 1969)

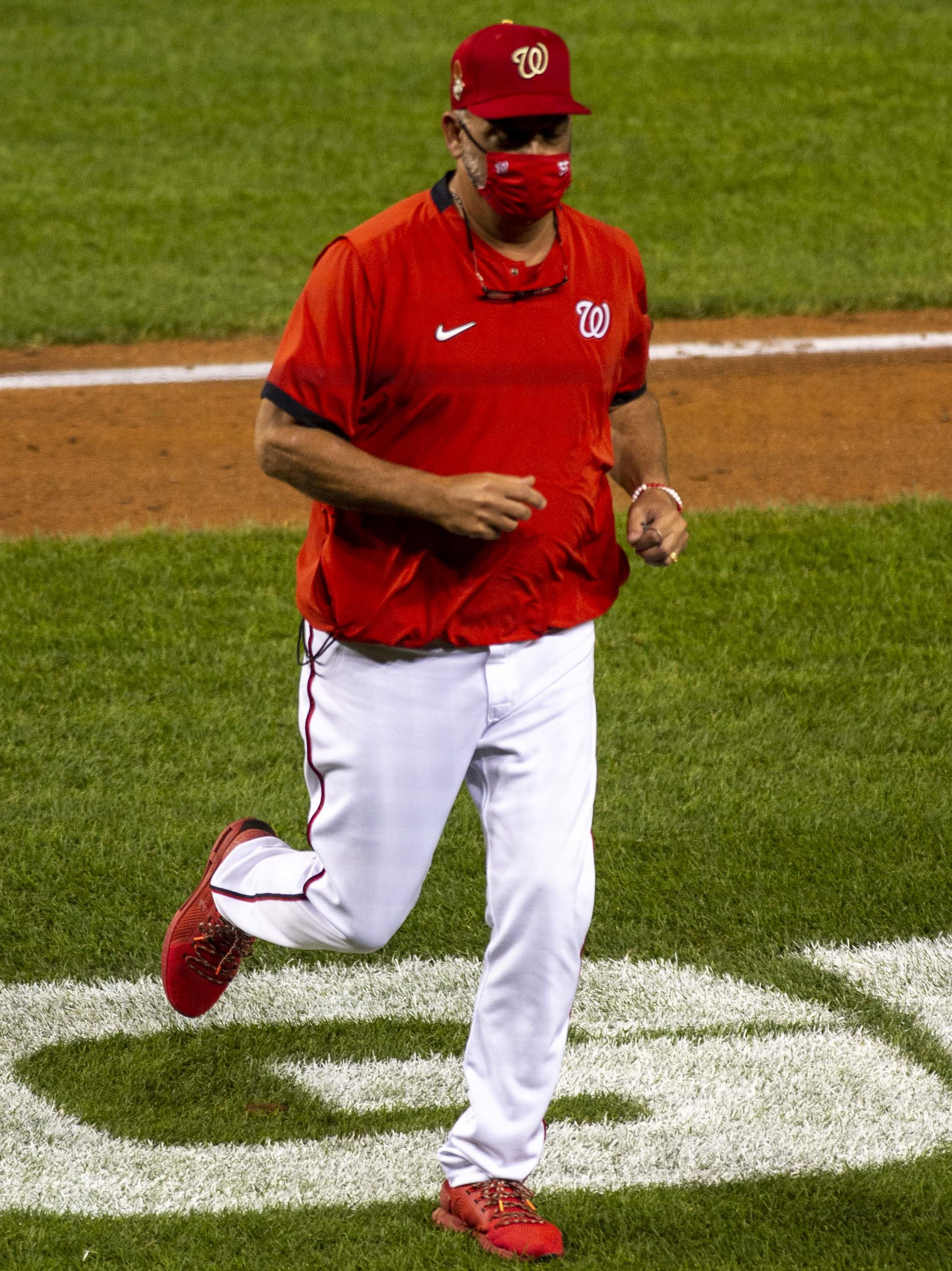
- Menhart with the Washington Nationals in 2020
- Pitcher
- Born: March 25, 1969 (age 57); St. Louis, Missouri, U.S.
- Batted: Right Threw: Right

MLB debut
- April 27, 1995, for the Toronto Blue Jays

Last MLB appearance
- September 27, 1997, for the San Diego Padres

MLB statistics
- Win–loss record: 5–9
- Earned run average: 5.47
- Strikeouts: 90
- Stats at Baseball Reference

Teams
- As player: Toronto Blue Jays (1995); Seattle Mariners (1996); San Diego Padres (1997); As coach: Washington Nationals (2019–2020)

Career highlights and awards
- World Series champion (2019)

Paul Gerard Menhart (born March 25, 1969) is an American baseball pitching coach for the West Virginia Power of the Atlantic League and former Major League Baseball player. He attended Western Carolina University and was a pitcher for three teams in Major League Baseball.

== Early life ==
Menhart was born in St. Louis, Missouri, on March 25, 1969, and grew up in Mystic, Connecticut. He attended Robert E. Fitch High School in Groton, Connecticut, where he played baseball, basketball, and soccer. He also played American Legion Baseball in New London, Connecticut.

After graduating from high school in 1987, Menhart played college baseball, pitching for Western Carolina of the Southern Conference for three seasons. During his college career, he had a 19–17 record overall – 11–6 in Southern Conference games – with 214 strikeouts. He led the Catamounts in strikeouts in each of his seasons and in innings pitched twice. In 1988, with an 8–3 record and a 3.55 earned run average (ERA), he was a first-team All-Southern Conference player. He was named the Southern Conference Tournament Most Valuable Player in 1989 after he threw a five-hitter with 10 strikeouts in the semifinals versus Appalachian State. During his college years, Western Carolina won the Southern Conference championship in 1988 and 1989.

== Professional career ==
=== Player ===
==== Toronto Blue Jays ====
===== 1990–1994 =====
Menhart opted to forego his senior year of college and enter the 1990 Major League Baseball draft. On June 4, 1990, the Toronto Blue Jays selected him in the eighth round of the draft as the 231st pick overall. He signed with the Blue Jays on June 6, 1990. He began his professional career with eight appearances – all starts – for the Class A-Short Season St. Catharines Blue Jays of the New York–Penn League, pitching to a 4.06 earned run average (ERA) over 40 innings, with 38 strikeouts and 19 walks and a record of 0–5. He then was promoted to the Myrtle Beach Blue Jays of the Class A South Atlantic League, where he pitched to a 3–0 record and a 0.59 ERA in 30 2/3 innings over four starts – one of them a complete game – and one relief appearance, striking out 18 and walking five.

Promoted again, Menhart spent the 1991 season with the Class A-Advanced Dunedin Blue Jays of the Florida State League, where he made 20 appearances, all starts, and pitched 128 1/3 innings; he finished the year with three complete games, a 10–6 record, a 2.66 ERA, 114 strikeouts, and 34 walks, and was a Florida State League All-Star. He rose to the Class AA level in 1992, pitching for the Knoxville Blue Jays of the Southern League all season, finishing with a 3.85 ERA and a 10–11 record over 28 appearances – all starts – and 177 2/3 innings pitched, with two complete games, 104 strikeouts, and 34 walks. In 1993, Menhart advanced to Class AAA, spending the season with the Syracuse Chiefs of the International League; with the Chiefs, he went 9–10 with a 3.64 ERA, making 25 appearances – all starts – pitching 151 innings and four complete games, striking out 108, and walking 67. However, he missed all of August 1993 with an elbow injury and late in 1993, while playing winter baseball in Puerto Rico during the 1993–1994 offseason, felt something snap in his elbow. He underwent ulnar collateral ligament reconstruction, popularly known as "Tommy John surgery", and as a result missed the entire 1994 season.

===== 1995 =====
In 1995, Menhart returned to action and made the Blue Jays′ 25-man major-league roster for Opening Day. He made his major-league debut on April 27, coming into a game at SkyDome in Toronto, Ontario, in relief of Blue Jays starter Pat Hentgen with one out in the ninth inning and Toronto leading the Oakland Athletics 7–1. He struck out the two batters he faced, Oakland first baseman Mark McGwire and right fielder Andy Tomberlin, to end the game. He made his first major-league start on May 30, facing the Detroit Tigers in Toronto, and struggled, giving up five earned runs before leaving the game in the fifth inning. Toronto sent him down to Syracuse, where he remained until the Blue Jays recalled him in late July.

Menhart had his best major-league outing on August 2, a pitchers′ duel with the Baltimore Orioles′ Mike Mussina at Oriole Park at Camden Yards in Baltimore, Maryland. Recalled from Syracuse only four days earlier and informed only hours before first pitch he would start the game because the scheduled starter, Al Leiter, had a blister, Menhart pitched a complete-game one-hitter; the only hit he gave up was a home run to designated hitter Harold Baines in the second inning. Mussina, however, shut out the Blue Jays with a complete-game four-hitter, and Toronto lost the game 1–0, dropping Menhart's record on the season to 1–2.

Menhart finished the 1995 season with a record of 1–4 in 21 appearances for Toronto, including nine starts, and an ERA of 4.92 over 78 2/3 innings pitched, with 50 strikeouts and 47 walks at the major-league level. In Class AAA play with Syracuse, he finished with a record of 2–4 in 10 appearances – all starts – and an ERA of 6.31 in 51 1/3 innings, with 30 strikeouts and 25 walks.

On December 18, 1995, Toronto traded Menhart and relief pitcher Edwin Hurtado to the Seattle Mariners for infielder Miguel Cairo and relief pitcher Bill Risley.

==== Seattle Mariners ====
The Seattle Mariners groomed Menhart to be their No. 4 starter for the 1996 season, but he suffered a calf injury during spring training that cost him two weeks and derailed those plans. He instead made the team as a reliever. The Mariners sent him down to the Class AAA Tacoma Rainiers of the Pacific Coast League for three weeks in May 1996, and again later in the season. On August 8, 1996, he underwent arthroscopic surgery on his shoulder. He finished the 1996 season with six starts and five relief appearances for Seattle, a record of 2–2, an ERA of 7.29, 18 strikeouts, and 25 walks in 42 innings pitched. At the Class AAA level, he went 0–3 for Tacoma with an 11.03 ERA in six appearances – all starts – and 12 strikeouts and 16 walks over 26 innings.

Menhart began the 1997 season with Tacoma, where he made 10 starts and five relief appearances and had a record of 4–7, an ERA of 6.16, and 51 strikeouts and 34 walks in 61 1/3 innings pitched. On June 10, 1997, the Mariners traded him to the San Diego Padres for pitcher Andrés Berumen.

==== San Diego Padres ====
Menhart finished the 1997 season in the San Diego Padres organization. He made nine appearances – eight of them starts – for the Padres and 11 – all of them starts – for the Padres′ Class AAA affiliate, the Las Vegas Stars of the Pacific Coast League. At San Diego, he had a 2–3 record and 4.70 ERA in 44 innings pitched, with 22 strikeouts and 13 walks, while at Las Vegas he finished with one complete game, an 0–7 record, an ERA of 5.97, and 44 strikeouts and 21 walks in 66 1/3 innings pitched. He made his last major league appearance on September 27, 1997, pitching for San Diego in a game against the San Francisco Giants at Candlestick Park in San Francisco, California.

Menhart spent the entire 1998 season with Las Vegas. He started two games and made 47 appearances in relief for the Stars, pitching 64 innings and finishing with an ERA of 5.34, a record of 7–6, and 50 strikeouts and 39 walks.

==== 1999–2001 ====
Menhart played for three different Class AAA teams in 1999, splitting the season between the Buffalo Bisons of the International League, a Cleveland Indians affiliate; the Calgary Cannons of the Pacific Coast League, then an affiliate with the Florida Marlins; and the Pacific Coast League's Edmonton Trappers, the Anaheim Angels′ Class AAA affiliate. He made seven appearances, all in relief, and pitched 13 innings for Buffalo, with a record of 2–1, an ERA of 4.85, and 10 strikeouts and four walks. He had a record of 2–2, an ERA of 4.89, and 30 strikeouts and 23 walks in 38 2/3 innings in eight appearances – all starts – for Calgary, while for Edmonton he pitched to a 3–3 record and 6.80 ERA in 42 1/3 innings over nine appearances – all starts – with 21 strikeouts and 14 walks. For 1999 as a whole, he finished with a 7–6 record and an ERA of 5.74 in 94 innings pitched over 17 starts and seven relief appearances, with 61 strikeouts and 41 walks.

In 2000, Menhart made 14 appearances – all starts – for the Class AAA Colorado Springs Sky Sox, an affiliate of the Colorado Rockies in the Pacific Coast League, with a record of 2–1, an ERA of 5.75, and 20 strikeouts and 12 walks over 20 1/3 innings pitched. He spent the rest of the season with the Solano Steelheads, an independent team in the Western Baseball League, where he made 18 appearances – all starts– and had a record of 2–2 and an ERA of 4.09, with 18 strikeouts and seven walks in 22 innings of work. He spent the 2001 season with the Steelheads, serving as their manager and pitching coach as well as pitching for them. He had a 1–2 record and 7.03 ERA in five appearances – all starts – in 2001, striking out 22 and walking nine in 24 1/3 innings pitched.

After the 2001 season, Menhart retired. His career was plagued by injuries: In addition to the "Tommy John" surgery that cost him the entire 1994 season, he underwent three arm surgeries and two shoulder surgeries during his playing career. He completed his playing career with 41 major-league appearances – 23 as a starter and 18 in relief – over three seasons in which he pitched 164 2/3 innings, with a record of 5–9, an ERA of 5.47, one complete game, 90 strikeouts, and 85 walks.

=== Coach ===
After retiring, and believing his baseball career to be over, Menhart returned to his home in Conyers, Georgia, where he took a job delivering windows. Unhappy with the work, he returned to Western Carolina University to complete the studies necessary for graduation with a degree in health and physical education. Finding during his stint as a player-manager and player-coach with Solano that he enjoyed coaching younger players and teaching, he taught middle-school health classes and also accepted a position as an assistant coach on the staff of the Western Carolina baseball team. He coached the Catamounts from 2003 to 2005.

In 2006, the Washington Nationals hired him, and he served in various capacities in the Nationals′ minor-league system until 2019. His assignments included stints as pitching coach for the Class A Savannah Sand Gnats of the South Atlantic League in 2006, the Class A Hagerstown Suns of the South Atlantic League in 2007 and 2008, the Class A-Advanced Potomac Nationals of the Carolina League from 2009 to 2011, the Class AA Harrisburg Senators of the Eastern League in 2012 and 2013, and the Class AAA Syracuse Chiefs of the International League in 2014.

In 2015, Menhart became the Washington Nationals′ minor-league pitching coordinator, and served in that capacity until May 2, 2019, when the Nationals announced they had fired their pitching coach, Derek Lilliquist, at the conclusion of that evening's game and Menhart had replaced him as pitching coach on the Nationals′ major-league staff immediately. Menhart won the World Series with the Washington Nationals in 2019.

On March 3, 2021, Menhart was announced as the pitching coach for the West Virginia Power, new members of the Atlantic League of Professional Baseball. Paul Menhart was released from the West Virginia Power in September 2021.

== Honors and awards ==
Menhart is a member of the Robert E. Fitch High School Athletic Hall of Fame.
