= Dilson =

Dilson can be a given name or a surname. Notable people with this name include:

== Given name ==
- Dilson (footballer), São Toméan footballer who plays as a left back
- Dilson Funaro (1933–1989) Brazilian businessman and politician
- Dilson Herrera (1994) Colombian professional baseball player
- Dilson Torres (1970) former Venezuelan pitcher in Major League Baseball who played for the Kansas City Royals in their 1995 season
- Dilson Díaz, leader of La Pestilencia band

== Surname ==
- John Dilson (1891–1944) American film actor
