= 1995 Detroit Tigers season =

Major League Baseball season

1995 Detroit Tigers
- League: American League
- Division: East
- Ballpark: Tiger Stadium
- City: Detroit, Michigan
- Record: 60–84 (.417)
- Divisional place: 4th
- Owners: Mike Ilitch
- General managers: Joe Klein
- Managers: Sparky Anderson
- Television: WKBD (George Kell, Al Kaline, Jim Price); PASS (Ernie Harwell, Jim Price, Fred McLeod)
- Radio: WJR (Frank Beckmann, Lary Sorensen)

The 1995 Detroit Tigers season was the team's 95th season and the 84th season at Tiger Stadium. The Tigers finished in fourth place in the American League East with a record of 60–84 (.417). The strike-shortened 1995 season was the last for Hall of Fame manager Sparky Anderson and longtime second baseman Lou Whitaker, who each retired at the end of the season, as well as Kirk Gibson who retired in August 1995.

== Regular season ==
The pitching continued to be a liability; they were outscored by their opponents 844–654. Only the Minnesota Twins allowed more runs in the American League.

Despite their inconsistencies, the surprising Tigers found themselves just three games out of first place after beating Kansas City, 4–2 on July 9. However, when play resumed after the All-Star break, the Tigers went into free-fall, winning only 23 of their last 74 games. The Tigers drew 1,180,979 fans to Tiger Stadium in 1995, ranking 11th of the 14 teams in the American League.

The Tigers set a new major league record for most home runs by a losing team when they hit seven homers in a 14–12 defeat to the Chicago White Sox on May 28.

=== Season standings ===
AL East
| Team | W | L | Pct. | GB | Home | Road |
|---|---|---|---|---|---|---|
| Boston Red Sox | 86 | 58 | .597 | — | 42‍–‍30 | 44‍–‍28 |
| New York Yankees | 79 | 65 | .549 | 7 | 46‍–‍26 | 33‍–‍39 |
| Baltimore Orioles | 71 | 73 | .493 | 15 | 36‍–‍36 | 35‍–‍37 |
| Detroit Tigers | 60 | 84 | .417 | 26 | 35‍–‍37 | 25‍–‍47 |
| Toronto Blue Jays | 56 | 88 | .389 | 30 | 29‍–‍43 | 27‍–‍45 |

=== Record vs. opponents ===
1995 American League record Source: MLB Standings Grid – 1995
| Team | BAL | BOS | CAL | CWS | CLE | DET | KC | MIL | MIN | NYY | OAK | SEA | TEX | TOR |
|---|---|---|---|---|---|---|---|---|---|---|---|---|---|---|
| Baltimore | — | 4–9 | 9–4 | 6–1 | 2–10 | 8–5 | 4–5 | 7–5 | 3–6 | 6–7 | 5–7 | 6–7 | 4–1 | 7–6 |
| Boston | 9–4 | — | 11–3 | 5–3 | 6–7 | 8–5 | 3–2 | 8–4 | 5–4 | 5–8 | 8–4 | 7–5 | 3–4 | 8–5 |
| California | 4–9 | 3–11 | — | 10–2 | 3–2 | 6–2 | 5–7 | 5–2 | 8–5 | 7–5 | 6–7 | 7–6 | 6–7 | 8–2 |
| Chicago | 1–6 | 3–5 | 2–10 | — | 5–8 | 8–4 | 8–5 | 6–7 | 10–3 | 3–2–1 | 7–5 | 4–9 | 5–7 | 6–5 |
| Cleveland | 10–2 | 7–6 | 2–3 | 8–5 | — | 10–3 | 11–1 | 9–4 | 9–4 | 6–6 | 7–0 | 5–4 | 6–3 | 10–3 |
| Detroit | 5–8 | 5–8 | 2–6 | 4–8 | 3–10 | — | 3–4 | 8–5 | 7–5 | 5–8 | 2–3 | 5–5 | 4–8 | 7–6 |
| Kansas City | 5–4 | 2–3 | 7–5 | 5–8 | 1–11 | 4–3 | — | 10–2 | 6–7 | 3–7 | 5–8 | 7–5 | 8–6 | 7–5 |
| Milwaukee | 5–7 | 4–8 | 2–5 | 7–6 | 4–9 | 5–8 | 2–10 | — | 9–4 | 5–6 | 7–2 | 3–2 | 5–7 | 7–5 |
| Minnesota | 6–3 | 4–5 | 5–8 | 3–10 | 4–9 | 5–7 | 7–6 | 4–9 | — | 3–4 | 5–7 | 4–8 | 5–8 | 1–4 |
| New York | 7–6 | 8–5 | 5–7 | 2–3–1 | 6–6 | 8–5 | 7–3 | 6–5 | 4–3 | — | 4–9 | 4–9 | 6–3 | 12–1 |
| Oakland | 7–5 | 4–8 | 7–6 | 5–7 | 0–7 | 3–2 | 8–5 | 2–7 | 7–5 | 9–4 | — | 7–6 | 5–8 | 3–7 |
| Seattle | 7–6 | 5–7 | 6–7 | 9–4 | 4–5 | 5–5 | 5–7 | 2–3 | 8–4 | 9–4 | 6–7 | — | 10–3 | 3–4 |
| Texas | 1–4 | 4–3 | 7–6 | 7–5 | 3–6 | 8–4 | 6–8 | 7–5 | 8–5 | 3–6 | 8–5 | 3–10 | — | 9–3 |
| Toronto | 6–7 | 5–8 | 2–8 | 5–6 | 3–10 | 6–7 | 5–7 | 5–7 | 4–1 | 1–12 | 7–3 | 4–3 | 3–9 | — |

=== Notable transactions ===
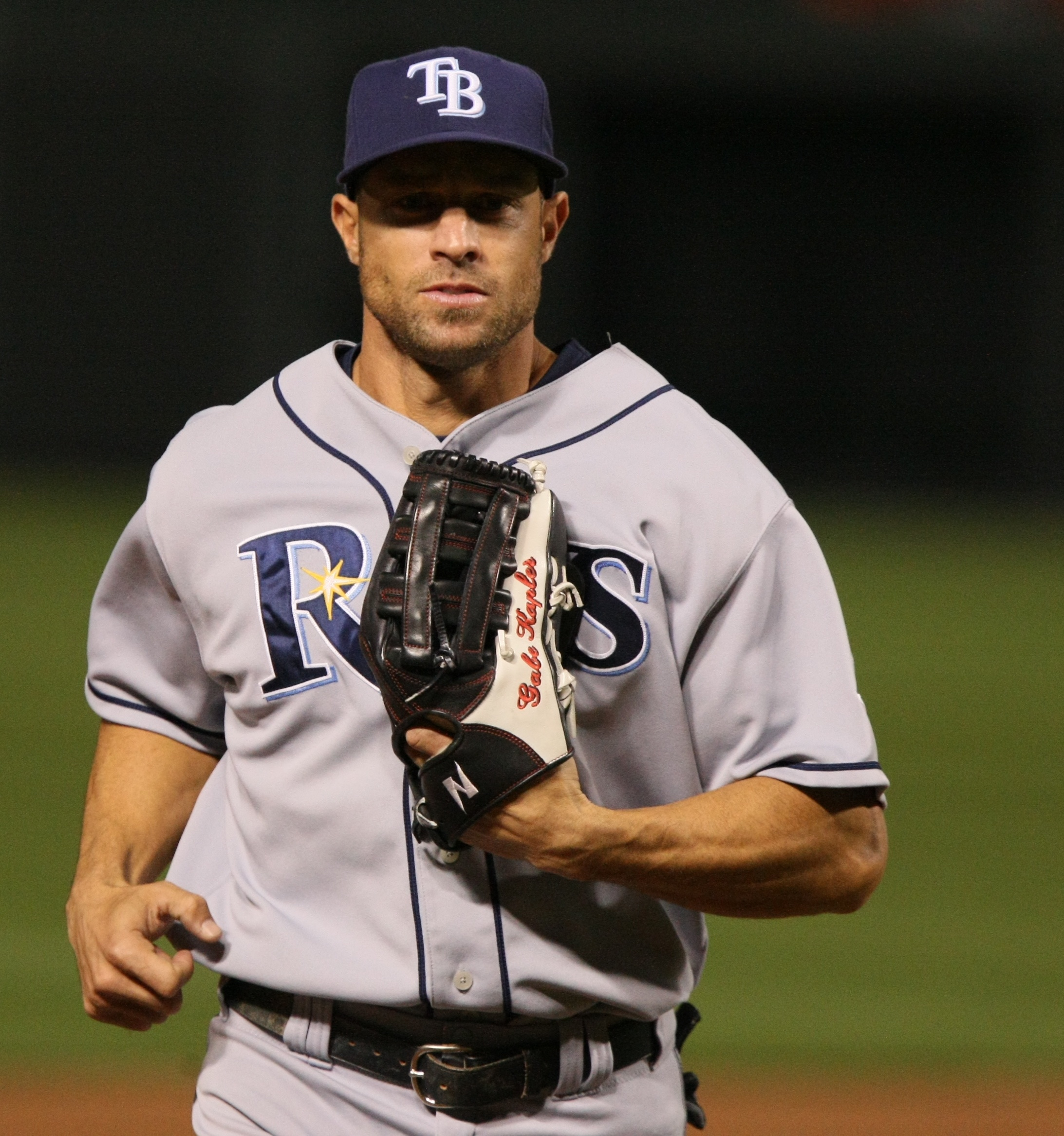
Gabe Kapler

- April 3, 1995: Kent Bottenfield was signed as a free agent with the Detroit Tigers.
- April 7, 1995: Joe Boever was signed as a free agent with the Detroit Tigers.
- April 7, 1995: Kirk Gibson was signed as a free agent with the Detroit Tigers.
- April 13, 1995: Tony Phillips was traded by the Detroit Tigers to the California Angels for Chad Curtis.
- April 17, 1995: Juan Samuel was signed as a free agent with the Detroit Tigers.
- June 1, 1995: Mark Mulder was drafted by the Detroit Tigers in the 55th round of the 1995 amateur draft, but did not sign.
- June 1, 1995: Gabe Kapler was drafted by the Detroit Tigers in the 57th round of the 1995 amateur draft. Player signed June 10, 1995.
- August 7, 1995: Buddy Groom was traded by the Detroit Tigers to the Florida Marlins for a player to be named later. The Florida Marlins sent Mike Myers (August 9, 1995) to the Detroit Tigers to complete the trade.
- August 10, 1995: Mike Henneman was traded by the Detroit Tigers to the Houston Astros for a player to be named later. The Houston Astros sent Phil Nevin (August 15, 1995) to the Detroit Tigers to complete the trade.
- September 8, 1995: Juan Samuel was traded by the Detroit Tigers to the Kansas City Royals for a player to be named later. The Kansas City Royals sent Phil Hiatt (September 14, 1995) to the Detroit Tigers to complete the trade.

=== Roster ===
1995 Detroit Tigers
Roster
| Pitchers: 27 Pat Ahearne; 43 Sean Bergman; 26 Ben Blomdahl; 37 Joe Boever; 49 Brian Bohanon; 33 Mike Christopher; 44 John Doherty; 46 Mike Gardiner; 34 Greg Gohr; 42 Buddy Groom; 39 Mike Henneman; 38 Dwayne Henry; 32 José Lima; 40 Felipe Lira; 15 Brian Maxcy; 21 Mike Moore; 27 Mike Myers; 36 C. J. Nitkowski; 46 Clint Sodowsky; 16 David Wells; 30 Sean Whiteside; 38 Kevin Wickander | Catchers: 12 John Flaherty; 25 Ron Tingley; Infielders: 17 Tony Clark; 45 Cecil Fielder; 10 Scott Fletcher; 24 Travis Fryman; 35 Chris Gomez; 7 Shannon Penn; 41 Steve Rodriguez; 8 Juan Samuel; 19,39 Franklin Stubbs; 3 Alan Trammell; 1 Lou Whitaker; 20 Derrick White | Outfielders: 29 Danny Bautista; 9 Chad Curtis; 22 Milt Cuyler; 23 Kirk Gibson; 28 Joe Hall; 4 Bobby Higginson; 42 Phil Nevin; 18 Rudy Pemberton; 13 Todd Steverson | Manager: 11 Sparky Anderson; Coaches: 31 Larry Herndon (Hitting); 54 Jeff Jones (Bullpen); 52 Gene Roof (First base); 53 Dick Tracewski (Third base); 51 Ralph Treuel (Pitching) |

== Player stats ==
| = Indicates team leader |

=== Batting ===
==== Starters by position ====
Note: Pos = Position; G = Games played; AB = At bats; H = Hits; Avg. = Batting average; HR = Home runs; RBI = Runs batted in

| Pos | Player | G | AB | H | Avg. | HR | RBI |
|---|---|---|---|---|---|---|---|
| C | John Flaherty | 112 | 226 | 56 | .248 | 4 | 22 |
| 1B | Cecil Fielder | 136 | 376 | 94 | .250 | 27 | 72 |
| 2B | Lou Whitaker | 84 | 249 | 73 | .293 | 14 | 44 |
| 3B | Travis Fryman | 144 | 567 | 156 | .275 | 15 | 81 |
| SS | Chris Gomez | 123 | 431 | 96 | .223 | 11 | 50 |
| LF | Bobby Higginson | 131 | 410 | 92 | .224 | 14 | 43 |
| CF | Chad Curtis | 144 | 586 | 157 | .268 | 21 | 67 |
| RF | Danny Bautista | 89 | 271 | 55 | .203 | 7 | 27 |
| DH | Kirk Gibson | 70 | 227 | 59 | .260 | 9 | 35 |

==== Other batters ====
Note: G = Games played; AB = At bats; H = Hits; Avg. = Batting average; HR = Home runs; RBI = Runs batted in

| Player | G | AB | H | Avg. | HR | RBI |
|---|---|---|---|---|---|---|
| Alan Trammell | 74 | 223 | 60 | .269 | 2 | 23 |
| Scott Fletcher | 67 | 182 | 42 | .231 | 1 | 17 |
| Juan Samuel | 76 | 171 | 48 | .281 | 10 | 34 |
| Ron Tingley | 54 | 124 | 28 | .226 | 4 | 18 |
| Franklin Stubbs | 62 | 116 | 29 | .250 | 2 | 19 |
| Tony Clark | 27 | 101 | 24 | .238 | 3 | 11 |
| Phil Nevin | 29 | 96 | 21 | .219 | 2 | 12 |
| Milt Cuyler | 41 | 88 | 18 | .205 | 0 | 5 |
| Derrick White | 39 | 48 | 9 | .188 | 0 | 2 |
| Todd Steverson | 30 | 42 | 11 | .262 | 2 | 6 |
| Steve Rodriguez | 12 | 31 | 6 | .194 | 0 | 0 |
| Rudy Pemberton | 12 | 30 | 9 | .300 | 0 | 3 |
| Joe Hall | 7 | 15 | 2 | .133 | 0 | 0 |
| Shannon Penn | 3 | 9 | 3 | .333 | 0 | 0 |

=== Pitching ===
==== Starting pitchers ====
Note: G = Games pitched; IP = Innings pitched; W = Wins; L = Losses; ERA = Earned run average; SO = Strikeouts

| Player | G | IP | W | L | ERA | SO |
|---|---|---|---|---|---|---|
| Sean Bergman | 28 | 135.1 | 7 | 10 | 5.12 | 86 |
| Mike Moore | 25 | 132.2 | 5 | 15 | 7.53 | 64 |
| David Wells | 18 | 130.1 | 10 | 3 | 3.04 | 83 |
| José Lima | 15 | 73.2 | 3 | 9 | 6.11 | 37 |
| C. J. Nitkowski | 11 | 39.1 | 1 | 4 | 7.09 | 13 |
| Clint Sodowsky | 6 | 23.1 | 2 | 2 | 5.01 | 14 |
| Pat Ahearne | 4 | 10.0 | 0 | 2 | 11.70 | 4 |

==== Other pitchers ====
Note: G = Games pitched; IP = Innings pitched; W = Wins; L = Losses; ERA = Earned run average; SO = Strikeouts

| Player | G | IP | W | L | ERA | SO |
|---|---|---|---|---|---|---|
| Felipe Lira | 37 | 146.1 | 9 | 13 | 4.31 | 89 |
| Brian Bohanon | 52 | 105.2 | 1 | 1 | 5.54 | 63 |

==== Relief pitchers ====
Note: G = Games pitched; W = Wins; L = Losses; SV = Saves; ERA = Earned run average; SO = Strikeouts

| Player | G | W | L | SV | ERA | SO |
|---|---|---|---|---|---|---|
| Mike Henneman | 29 | 0 | 1 | 18 | 1.53 | 24 |
| Joe Boever | 60 | 5 | 7 | 3 | 6.39 | 71 |
| John Doherty | 48 | 5 | 9 | 6 | 5.10 | 46 |
| Brian Maxcy | 41 | 4 | 5 | 0 | 6.88 | 20 |
| Mike Christopher | 36 | 4 | 0 | 1 | 3.82 | 34 |
| Buddy Groom | 23 | 1 | 3 | 1 | 7.52 | 23 |
| Kevin Wickander | 21 | 0 | 0 | 1 | 2.60 | 9 |
| Ben Blomdahl | 14 | 0 | 0 | 1 | 7.77 | 15 |
| Mike Myers | 11 | 1 | 0 | 0 | 9.95 | 4 |
| Greg Gohr | 10 | 1 | 0 | 0 | 0.87 | 12 |
| Dwayne Henry | 10 | 1 | 0 | 5 | 6.23 | 9 |
| Mike Gardiner | 9 | 0 | 0 | 0 | 14.59 | 7 |
| Sean Whiteside | 2 | 0 | 0 | 0 | 14.73 | 2 |

== Awards and honors ==
All-Star Game

- David Wells, Pitcher, Reserve (First All-Star appearance)

== Farm system ==
| Level | Team | League | Manager |
|---|---|---|---|
| AAA | Toledo Mud Hens | International League | Tom Runnells |
| AA | Jacksonville Suns | Southern League | Bill Plummer |
| A | Lakeland Tigers | Florida State League | Dave Anderson |
| A | Fayetteville Generals | South Atlantic League | Dwight Lowry |
| A-Short Season | Jamestown Jammers | New York–Penn League | Bruce Fields |
| Rookie | GCL Tigers | Gulf Coast League | Kevin Bradshaw |
