= Phil Plantier =

American baseball player (born 1969)

- Left Fielder / Coach
- Born: January 27, 1969 (age 57); Manchester, New Hampshire, U.S.
- Batted: Left Threw: Right

MLB debut
- August 21, 1990, for the Boston Red Sox

Last MLB appearance
- September 28, 1997, for the St. Louis Cardinals

MLB statistics
- Batting average: .243
- Home runs: 91
- Runs batted in: 292
- Stats at Baseball Reference

Teams
- As player: Boston Red Sox (1990–1992); San Diego Padres (1993–1994); Houston Astros (1995); San Diego Padres (1995); Oakland Athletics (1996); San Diego Padres (1997); St. Louis Cardinals (1997); As coach: San Diego Padres (2012–2014); Los Angeles Angels (2023)

Phillip Alan Plantier (born January 27, 1969) is an American former professional baseball outfielder who played in Major League Baseball (MLB) from 1990 to 1997. Listed at 6 feet 0 inches (1.83 m) and 175 pounds (79 kg), he batted left-handed and threw right-handed. After his playing career, he spent three seasons as a hitting coach with the San Diego Padres and as an assistant hitting coach with the Los Angeles Angels.

== Playing career ==
The Boston Red Sox selected Plantier in the 11th round of the 1987 Major League Baseball draft. He developed a knack for hitting home runs in the minor leagues and skipped the Double-A level altogether. Plantier first entered the major leagues in 1990 after a midseason call-up from the Pawtucket Red Sox and primarily served as a pinch hitter, but did not play enough for it to be considered his rookie year. In 1991 he was first called up to Boston in June, and played in 11 games, but was sent back down to Pawtucket two weeks later. He was finally called back up to Boston on August 10 and went on a very impressive run over 42 games. In 53 total games and 148 at-bats, he hit 11 home runs and 35 runs batted in (RBIs) while hitting .331, for a ratio of a home run hit every 13.38 at-bats. As a result, Plantier finished 8th in Rookie of the Year voting.

Plantier was unable to repeat his rookie performance in 1992, and was traded to the San Diego Padres during the following offseason. He enjoyed his best full season in 1993 wherein he hit 34 home runs with 100 RBI, both career highs.

After an injury plagued 1994 season, Plantier was part of an eleven player offseason trade between the Padres and the Houston Astros that brought Ken Caminiti and Steve Finley to San Diego while sending Derek Bell to Houston, among others. He was later traded back to the Padres in July 1995 after roughly half a season with the Astros. Prior to the 1996 season, Plantier signed with the Detroit Tigers, however, during spring training he was traded to the Oakland Athletics for infielder Fausto Cruz and pitcher Ramon Fermin, spending the 1996 season as a reserve outfielder and designated hitter for the A's.

Plantier signed with the Padres for the 1997 season. On June 13, 1997, the Padres traded Plantier, Fernando Valenzuela, and Scott Livingstone to the St. Louis Cardinals for Rich Batchelor, Danny Jackson, and Mark Sweeney. Plantier played for the Cardinals as a reserve outfielder and finished out his major league career. Plantier signed as a free agent with Toronto Blue Jays in 1998, but did not appear in any major league games with the club.

== Coaching career ==
In 2007, Plantier was named the manager of the Macon Music of the South Coast League, an independent baseball league that only lasted for that year. In 2008, Plantier was the hitting coach for the Double-A West Tenn Diamond Jaxx in the Seattle Mariners organization. On January 13, 2009, he was named the manager of the Diamond Jaxx.

In 2010, Plantier was the Minor League Hitting Coordinator for the Seattle Mariners. In 2011, Plantier was named hitting coach, then assigned manager during mid-season for the Lake Elsinore Storm, a Single-A affiliate of the San Diego Padres.

Plantier was named hitting coach of the Padres on October 31, 2011. He held that position for three seasons; in December 2014, he was replaced by Mark Kotsay.

In 2018, Plantier became the hitting coach of the Scranton/Wilkes-Barre RailRiders, where he spent two seasons.

In August 2019, Plantier was a coach for the United States national baseball team at the 2019 WBSC Premier12 tournament. The team finished in fourth place, missing an opportunity to qualify for the 2020 Olympics via that event.

In 2021, Plantier was hired as hitting coach for the Jacksonville Jumbo Shrimp, the Miami Marlins' Triple-A affiliate where he spent two seasons.

On November 7, 2022, Plantier was hired as the assistant hitting coach for the Los Angeles Angels.

Preceded by Randy Ready	San Diego Padres hitting coach 2012–2014	Succeeded by Mark Kotsay
