= Miguel Cairo =

Venezuelan baseball player and coach (born 1974)

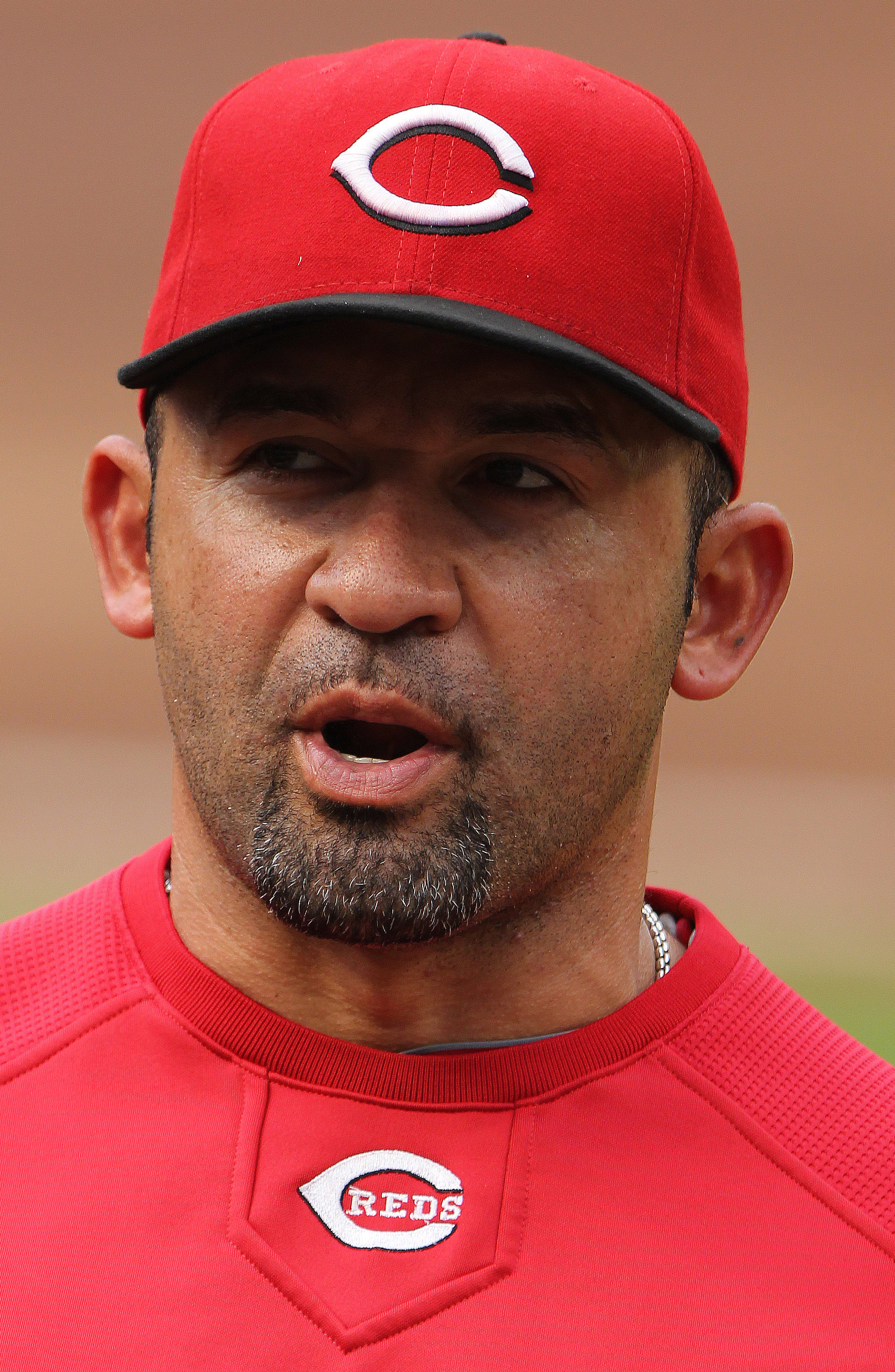
- Cairo with the Cincinnati Reds in 2011

Baltimore Orioles – No. 47
- Infielder / Manager / Coach
- Born: May 4, 1974 (age 52); Anaco, Anzoátegui, Venezuela
- Batted: Right Threw: Right

MLB debut
- April 17, 1996, for the Toronto Blue Jays

Last MLB appearance
- October 3, 2012, for the Cincinnati Reds

MLB statistics
- Batting average: .264
- Home runs: 41
- Runs batted in: 394
- Managerial record: 47–59
- Winning %: .443
- Stats at Baseball Reference

Teams
- As player: Toronto Blue Jays (1996); Chicago Cubs (1997); Tampa Bay Devil Rays (1998–2000); Chicago Cubs (2001); St. Louis Cardinals (2001–2003); New York Yankees (2004); New York Mets (2005); New York Yankees (2006–2007); St. Louis Cardinals (2007); Seattle Mariners (2008); Philadelphia Phillies (2009); Cincinnati Reds (2010–2012); As manager: Chicago White Sox (2022); Washington Nationals (2025); As coach: Chicago White Sox (2021–2022); Washington Nationals (2024–2025); Baltimore Orioles (2026–present)

Miguel Jesús Cairo [ki'-row] (born May 4, 1974) is a Venezuelan former professional baseball infielder and coach who currently serves as the infield coach for the Baltimore Orioles of Major League Baseball (MLB). He played for nine different teams in a 17-year career in MLB, from 1996 to 2012. During his playing days, Cairo stood 6 feet 1 inch (1.85 m) tall and weighed 225 pounds (102 kg), batting and throwing right-handed. While primarily a second baseman, Cairo was able to play all the infield positions and as a corner outfielder. He was also used for pinch-hitting duties late in his career.

Cairo was interim manager for the Chicago White Sox in the latter part of the 2022 season as manager Tony La Russa stepped away due to health concerns. He became the interim manager of the Washington Nationals in July 2025 after the team fired Dave Martinez. Cairo was briefly the bench coach of the St. Louis Cardinals in 2013 and has worked as a coach and instructor for several teams since retiring as a player.

== Playing career ==
=== Los Angeles Dodgers (1990–1995) ===
Cairo was signed as an undrafted free agent by the Los Angeles Dodgers on September 20, 1990. After beginning his career with the Dodgers Dominican Summer League team, he played with the rookie class Gulf Coast Dodgers (1992), Class-A Vero Beach Dodgers (1992–1993), Advanced Class-A Bakersfield Dodgers (1994) and AA San Antonio Missions.

=== Toronto Blue Jays (1996) ===
On November 29, 1995, the Dodgers traded Cairo with Willis Otañez to the Seattle Mariners for Mike Blowers, who then traded him, along with Bill Risley, to the Toronto Blue Jays for Edwin Hurtado and Paul Menhart on December 18, 1995.

Cairo made his major league debut with the Toronto Blue Jays on April 17, 1996, as the starting 2nd baseman. In his first Major League at-bat, he hit a double off Chuck Finley of the California Angels. He played in 9 games for the Blue Jays, with six hits in 27 at-bats for a .222 average. He also played in 120 games for the AAA Syracuse Chiefs, hitting .277.

=== Chicago Cubs (1997) ===
On November 20, 1996, he was traded to the Chicago Cubs in exchange for minor leaguer Jason Stevenson. Cairo spent most of the 1997 season with the AAA Iowa Cubs, where he hit .279 in 135 games and was selected to the American Association All-Star team. He also appeared in 16 games for the Cubs and had seven hits in 29 at-bats (.241).

=== Tampa Bay Devil Rays (1998–2000) ===
The Tampa Bay Devil Rays selected Cairo with the eighth pick in the 1997 MLB expansion draft. He hit his first home run on April 28, 1998, off of Mike Oquist for the Oakland Athletics. He spent three seasons with the Devil Rays, playing fairly frequently, and hit .275 in 389 games. He was the final active player from their inaugural season when he retired.

=== Chicago Cubs (second stint) (2001) ===
Cairo signed with the Oakland Athletics during the 2000–2001 offseason, but in March 2001 he was traded back to the Cubs for Eric Hinske. In 66 games with the Cubs, he hit .285.

=== St. Louis Cardinals (2001–2003) ===
In August 2001, the St. Louis Cardinals claimed Cairo on waivers from the Cubs. He remained with the Cardinals through the 2003 season. He hit .333 in 27 games in 2001, .250 in 108 games in 2002 and .245 in 92 games in 2003. He also appeared in the postseason for the first time in his career in 2001. In the 2002 National League Championship Series against the San Francisco Giants he had five hits, including a home run, in 13 at-bats.

=== New York Yankees (2004) ===
Cairo signed with the New York Yankees during the 2003–04 offseason.

In 2004, Cairo won the second base job with the Yankees after starting the year in a platoon with Enrique Wilson. Cairo led the league in percentage of productive outs in 2004 for players with a minimum of 40 at-bats. Cairo recorded 17 productive outs in 32 productive out situations, for a PO% of 0.531. Cairo had the highest winning percentage of team wins when he played in a game of any player in the majors in 2004 (for players with over 100 games played). However, the Yankees declined to offer him a contract for 2005 and signed Tony Womack as their new second baseman.

=== New York Mets (2005) ===
Cairo was signed by the New York Mets as a free agent before the 2005 season and hit .251 in 100 games.

=== New York Yankees (second stint) (2006–2007) ===
He returned to the Yankees in 2006 and hit .239 in 81 games.

On August 7, 2007, the Yankees designated him for assignment in order to make room on the 40-man roster for Jason Giambi. He was released on August 15.

=== St. Louis Cardinals (second stint) (2007) ===
On August 19, 2007, the St. Louis Cardinals signed Cairo to a minor league contract, with him reporting to AAA Memphis on August 22. On September 1, 2007, the Cardinals activated him and brought him up to start at second base in a game against the Cincinnati Reds. He became a free agent after the season.

=== Seattle Mariners (2008) ===
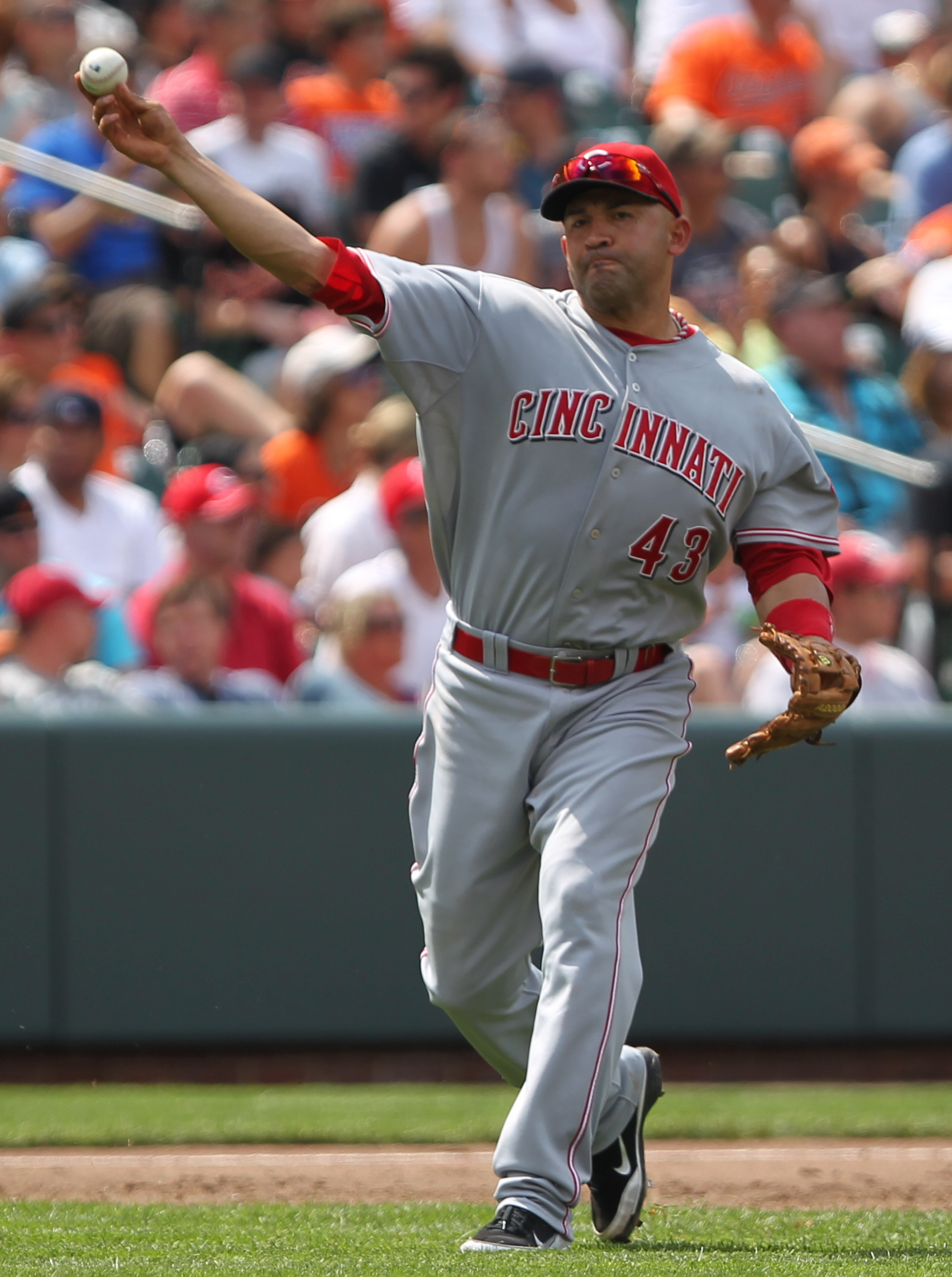
Cairo with the Reds.

On January 8, 2008, he signed a one-year contract with the Seattle Mariners.

Early at the season, Cairo was seldom used, losing his playing time to teammate Willie Bloomquist and Greg Norton. Norton was soon traded to the Atlanta Braves and, with outfield trouble, the Mariners started a platoon with Bloomquist and Jeremy Reed in center field. which allowed Cairo to be a back-up for struggling first baseman Richie Sexson.

On July 10, the Mariners released Sexson and Cairo assumed the role of full-time first baseman for a few days until Bryan LaHair was finished nursing a sore toe. For the rest of the season, Cairo shared duties at first base with left-handed hitting LaHair, and started at the other infield positions when the incumbents had an off-day.

=== Philadelphia Phillies (2009) ===
On February 15, 2009, Cairo signed a minor league contract with an invitation to spring training with the Philadelphia Phillies. On May 19, 2009, the Phillies outrighted Cairo to the AAA Lehigh Valley IronPigs.

Cairo was sent back up to the Phillies on August 23 after they placed Greg Dobbs on the 15-day DL. He returned to the utility infield position, and was retained by the club through the remainder of the regular season. His performance during this stint, including several key hits, led to his inclusion in the division-winning team's postseason roster.

=== Cincinnati Reds (2010–2012) ===
On January 27, 2010, Cairo signed a minor league contract with the Cincinnati Reds. On April 2, Cairo made the Opening Day roster. On December 8, as a free agent, he signed a two-year deal with the Reds, which was the first multi-year contract of his career. He had the first multi-home run game of his career on August 13, against the San Diego Padres, in a game that the Reds won 13–1.

== Venezuela Winter League ==
In between seasons, Cairo played winter ball with the Leones del Caracas and Cardenales de Lara clubs of the Venezuelan League during the 1993–2003 seasons, hitting .286 with a .351 slugging average in 358 games. Additionally, he hit .308 for the 2000–2001 Cardenales champion team en route to the 2001 Caribbean Series, where he batted .360 and slugged .680 with six RBI.

== Coaching career ==
=== Cincinnati Reds ===
On February 14, 2013, the Reds announced that Cairo would operate as a special assistant to general manager Walt Jocketty, effectively ending his playing career. At the end of spring training, Reds third base coach Mark Berry was diagnosed with throat cancer, leading Cairo to fill in as the team's bench coach while Chris Speier moved to third base coach. With Berry's return, Cairo moved back to his intended role as assistant to Jocketty. Cairo worked as a special assistant through 2017.

=== Chicago White Sox ===
Cairo worked for the New York Yankees in player development and was a minor league infield coordinator from 2018 to 2020.

On November 18, 2020, the Chicago White Sox announced that Cairo would join their coaching staff as bench coach under manager Tony La Russa. On August 12, 2021, Cairo managed the White Sox to victory over the Yankees in the first Field of Dreams game, as Tony La Russa was unavailable due to a family funeral. On August 31, 2022, Cairo was named acting manager of the White Sox while La Russa underwent testing for an unnamed medical condition. The White Sox went 18–16 under Cairo and failed to reach the playoffs. After the season, general manager Rick Hahn said Cairo deserved to interview for the managerial job, which went to Pedro Grifol.

=== New York Mets ===
During the 2023 season, Cairo served as the New York Mets minor league field coordinator.

=== Washington Nationals ===
On November 10, 2023, Cairo agreed to join the Washington Nationals as bench coach.

On July 7, 2025, Cairo was named interim manager of the Nationals following the firing of Dave Martinez. He won his first game as the Nationals manager in an 8–2 win against the St. Louis Cardinals on July 9. Under Cairo, the Nationals went 29–43. After the 2025 season, Cairo interviewed with the Nationals for the manager position, but the team did not select him, instead choosing Blake Butera as its next manager.

=== Baltimore Orioles ===
On November 15, 2025, the Baltimore Orioles hired Cairo to serve as the team's infield coach.

=== Managerial record ===
As of the end of 2025 season

Team	Year	Regular season					Postseason			
Team	Year	Games	Won	Lost	Win %	Finish	Won	Lost	Win %	Result
CHW	2022	34	18	16	.529	2nd in AL Central	–	–	–	–
CHW total		34	18	16	.529		–	–	–	–
WAS	2025	72	29	43	.403	5th in NL East	–	–	–	–
WAS total		72	29	43	.403		–	–	–	–
Total		106	47	59	.443					

== Personal life ==
Cairo is married and has two children. His son Christian is a professional baseball player who was drafted in the fourth round of the 2019 MLB draft by the then-Cleveland Indians (now Cleveland Guardians).

== See also ==
- List of Major League Baseball players from Venezuela
