= Ramón Fermín =

Dominican baseball player (born 1972)

- Pitcher
- Born: November 25, 1972 (age 53); San Francisco de Macorís, Dominican Republic
- Batted: Right Threw: Right

MLB debut
- August 6, 1995, for the Oakland Athletics

Last MLB appearance
- August 6, 1995, for the Oakland Athletics

MLB statistics
- Win–loss record: 0–0
- Earned run average: 13.50
- Strikeouts: 0

CPBL statistics
- Win–loss record: 0–0
- Earned run average: 6.23
- Strikeouts: 1
- Stats at Baseball Reference

Teams
- Oakland Athletics (1995); Brother Elephants (1998)

Ramón Antonio Fermín Ventura (born November 25, 1972) is a Dominican former professional baseball relief pitcher. He played in one game in Major League Baseball for the Oakland Athletics during the 1995 season. Listed at 6' 3", 180 lb., he batted and threw right-handed.

In 1.1 innings of work, Fermín gave up four hits, two runs and a walk for a 13.50 ERA. He did not have a decision.

Before the 1996 season Fermín was traded by Oakland along with Fausto Cruz to the Detroit Tigers in exchange for Phil Plantier, but he did not play for Detroit. He pitched in their farm system that year, and again in 1997, before being let go. He attempted a comeback in 2001 for the New Jersey Jackals of the independent Northern League, but pitched just 4 games before calling it quits.
