= Sean Whiteside =

American baseball player (born 1971)

- Pitcher
- Born: April 19, 1971 (age 55); Lakeland, Florida, U.S.
- Batted: Left Threw: Left

MLB debut
- April 29, 1995, for the Detroit Tigers

Last MLB appearance
- May 3, 1995, for the Detroit Tigers

MLB statistics
- Win–loss record: 0–0
- Earned run average: 14.73
- Strikeouts: 2
- Stats at Baseball Reference

Teams
- Detroit Tigers (1995)

David Sean Whiteside (born April 19, 1971) is an American former Major League Baseball pitcher who played for one season. He pitched for the Detroit Tigers in two games during the 1995 Detroit Tigers season.
