= Jimmy Rogers (baseball) =

American baseball player (born 1967)

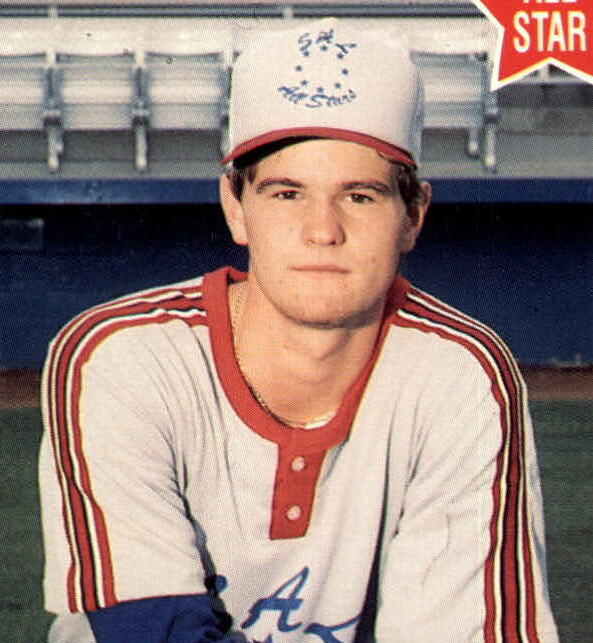
- Rogers c. 1988
- Pitcher
- Born: January 3, 1967 (age 59); Tulsa, Oklahoma, U.S.
- Batted: Right Threw: Right

MLB debut
- July 30, 1995, for the Toronto Blue Jays

Last MLB appearance
- September 27, 1995, for the Toronto Blue Jays

MLB statistics
- Win–loss record: 2–4
- Earned run average: 5.70
- Strikeouts: 13
- Stats at Baseball Reference

Teams
- Toronto Blue Jays (1995)

James Randall Rogers (born January 3, 1967) is an American former Major League Baseball (MLB) pitcher. Rogers played for the Toronto Blue Jays in 1995. He batted and threw right-handed.

Rogers graduated from Webster High School in Tulsa, Oklahoma in 1985 where he was an all-state shortstop. After high school, he played college baseball at Oklahoma's Seminole State College. At Seminole State in 1986, he began pitching full-time and was selected by the Blue Jays in the 16th round of the 1986 Major League Baseball draft. In 1987, he was named to the 1987 ABCA/Rawlings NJCAA Division-I All-America First Team, helped lead Seminole State to the JUCO World Series and was projected as a first round pick in the 1987 draft, he signed with the Blue Jays instead of re-entering the draft.

After his playing career, Rogers spent more than a decade as an assistant coach for the Rogers State Hillcats baseball team.
