= Kenny Robinson (baseball) =

American baseball player (1969–1999)

- Pitcher
- Born: November 3, 1969; Barberton, Ohio, U.S.
- Died: February 28, 1999 (aged 29); Tucson, Arizona, U.S.
- Batted: Right Threw: Right

MLB debut
- July 20, 1995, for the Toronto Blue Jays

Last MLB appearance
- September 24, 1997, for the Toronto Blue Jays

MLB statistics
- Win–loss record: 2–2
- Earned run average: 3.91
- Strikeouts: 40
- Stats at Baseball Reference

Teams
- Toronto Blue Jays (1995); Kansas City Royals (1996); Toronto Blue Jays (1997)

Kenneth Neal Robinson (November 3, 1969 – February 28, 1999) was an American professional baseball pitcher, who played in Major League Baseball (MLB) for the Toronto Blue Jays (1995, 1997) and Kansas City Royals (1996). Listed at 5' 9", 175 lb., Robinson batted and threw right-handed.

A native of Barberton, Ohio, Robinson played college baseball for Florida State University. In 1991, he played collegiate summer baseball with the Brewster Whitecaps of the Cape Cod Baseball League. Robinson was selected by the Blue Jays in the 10th round (276th overall) of the 1991 Major League Baseball draft.

Over the course of Robinson’s three-season major league career, he posted a 2–2 record, with a 3.91 earned run average (ERA), while recording no saves (SV) in one save opportunity (SVO), across 29 pitching appearances, all in relief.

Robinson was signed by the Arizona Diamondbacks on February 17, 1998. He died in Tucson, Arizona in a traffic collision during spring training on February 28, 1999. Robinson was 29. A teammate, minor leaguer John Rosengren, had been driving the vehicle involved in the accident; he was charged with second-degree murder due to being under the influence of alcohol. Key evidence in the case was thrown out because police did not allow Rosengren to call his father (who was an attorney) after the collision, and he returned to playing baseball.
