= Shannon Penn =

American baseball player (born 1969)

- Designated hitter
- Born: September 11, 1969 (age 56); Cincinnati, Ohio, U.S.
- Batted: Both Threw: Right

MLB debut
- April 28, 1995, for the Detroit Tigers

Last MLB appearance
- September 29, 1996, for the Detroit Tigers

MLB statistics
- Games played: 9
- Batting average: .174
- Runs batted in: 1
- Stats at Baseball Reference

Teams
- Detroit Tigers (1995–1996)

Shannon Dion Penn (born September 11, 1969) is an American former designated hitter in Major League Baseball. He played for the Detroit Tigers.
