= Dilson (footballer) =

São Toméan footballer (born 1994/99)

Personal information
- Full name: Dilson Neves Quaresma
- Date of birth: 17 November 1994 (age 31) or 16 September 1999 (age 27)
- Position: Left back

Team information
- Current team: UDRA

Senior career*
Years	Team	Apps	(Gls)
–2018	Sporting São Tomé		
2019	Cano Sport		
2019–	UDRA		

International career^{‡}
2018	São Tomé and Príncipe U23	1+	(0)
2017–	São Tomé and Príncipe	9	(0)
- * Club domestic league appearances and goals ‡ National team caps and goals as of 13 November 2020

Dilson Neves Quaresma, simply known as Dilson, is a São Toméan footballer who plays as a left back for UDRA, and the São Tomé and Príncipe national team.

== Club career ==
On 13 January 2019, Dilson joined Equatorial Guinean Liga Nacional de Fútbol club Cano Sport Academy.

== International career ==
Dilson made his international debut for São Tomé and Príncipe in 2017.
