= Chris Eddy =

American baseball player (born 1969)

- Pitcher
- Born: November 27, 1969 (age 56); Dallas, Texas
- Batted: Left Threw: Left

MLB debut
- April 26, 1995, for the Oakland Athletics

Last MLB appearance
- May 12, 1995, for the Oakland Athletics

MLB statistics
- Win–loss record: 0–0
- Earned run average: 7.36
- Strikeouts: 2
- Stats at Baseball Reference

Teams
- Oakland Athletics (1995)

Christopher Mark Eddy (born November 27, 1969) is an American former Major League Baseball pitcher. He threw and batted left-handed.

== Biography ==
Eddy attended Duncanville High School in Duncanville, Texas, and Texas Christian University.

He was drafted by the Kansas City Royals in the third round (78th overall) of the 1992 Major League Baseball draft. He was selected by the Oakland Athletics from the Royals in the 1994 Rule 5 draft. After appearing in six games with the Athletics, he was returned to the Royals, never again pitching in the majors.

As of 2021, Eddy works as the Athletic Director for the Charter School of Wilmington in Delaware. He has been in this position since May 2009.
