= Edwin Hurtado =

Venezuelan baseball player (born 1970)

- Pitcher
- Born: February 1, 1970 (age 56); Barquisimeto, Lara, Venezuela
- Batted: Right Threw: Right

MLB debut
- May 22, 1995, for the Toronto Blue Jays

Last MLB appearance
- July 30, 1997, for the Seattle Mariners

MLB statistics
- Win–loss record: 8–9
- Earned run average: 6.67
- Strikeouts: 79
- Stats at Baseball Reference

Teams
- Toronto Blue Jays (1995); Seattle Mariners (1996–1997); Orix BlueWave (1998–1999); LG Twins (2004)

Member of the Venezuelan

Baseball Hall of Fame
- Induction: 2019
- Vote: 81%
- Election method: Contemporary Committee

Edwin Amilgar Hurtado (born February 1, 1970) is a Venezuelan former middle relief pitcher in Major League Baseball who played from 1995 through 1997 for the Toronto Blue Jays and Seattle Mariners.

== Career ==
He also played for the Orix BlueWave of Nippon Professional Baseball in 1998 and 1998 and LG Twins of the KBO League in 2004. Listed at 6 ft 3 in (1.91 m) and 215 pounds (98 kg), Hurtado threw and batted right-handed. He was born in Barquisimeto, the capital city of Lara state.

In a three-year majors career, Hurtado posted an 8–9 record with a 6.67 ERA in 43 pitching appearances, including 15 starts and two saves, allowing 111 runs (107 earned) on 85 walks and 167 hits while striking out 79 batters in 144 1/3 innings of work.

Hurtado debuted with the Blue Jays in May 1995. He tied for fourth in the American League that year with 11 wild pitches. In December, Hurtado was traded from the Blue Jays to the Mariners with Paul Menhart for Bill Risley and Miguel Cairo. Hurtado earned the win on Opening Day in 1996 but had surgery to remove bone chips in his throwing elbow that July.

Hurtado also pitched 13 minor league seasons from 1993 to 2006, including stints for the Orix BlueWave in Japan in 1998 and 1999 and for LG Twins in South Korea in 2004. He also pitched in the Mexican Baseball League.

During his career, Hurtado played winter ball with Cardenales de Lara and Leones del Caracas in the Venezuelan Professional Baseball League during 16 campaigns from 1991 to 2006. He won 68 games in the winter league and was twice named the pitcher of the year.

Following his retirement, Hurtado became a pitching coach and has worked for teams in Mexico, Colombia, and Venezuela. He was a pitching coach for the DSL Nationals, a Washington Nationals minor league affiliate.

== Personal life ==
Hurtado is married.

== See also ==
- List of Major League Baseball players from Venezuela
