= George Williams (catcher) =

American baseball player (born 1969)

- Catcher
- Born: April 22, 1969 (age 55); La Crosse, Wisconsin, U.S.
- Batted: Both Threw: Right

MLB debut
- July 14, 1995, for the Oakland Athletics

Last MLB appearance
- September 13, 2000, for the San Diego Padres

MLB statistics
- Batting average: .243
- Home runs: 10
- Runs batted in: 48
- Stats at Baseball Reference

Teams
- Oakland Athletics (1995–1998); San Diego Padres (2000)

George Erik Williams (born April 22, 1969) is an American former professional baseball catcher who played for the Oakland Athletics and San Diego Padres of Major League Baseball (MLB) in parts of four seasons spanning 1995–2000. Listed at 5' 10", 190 lb., Williams was a switch-hitter and threw right handed. He was born in La Crosse, Wisconsin.
