= Dilson Torres =

Venezuelan baseball player (born 1970)

- Pitcher
- Born: May 31, 1970 (age 54); Maracay, Aragua, Venezuela
- Batted: Right Threw: Right

MLB debut
- April 29, 1995, for the Kansas City Royals

Last MLB appearance
- September 27, 1995, for the Kansas City Royals

MLB statistics
- Win–loss record: 1–2
- Earned run average: 6.09
- Strikeouts: 28

CPBL statistics
- Win–loss record: 0–0
- Earned run average: 21.00
- Strikeouts: 3
- Stats at Baseball Reference

Teams
- Kansas City Royals (1995); Mercuries Tigers (1998)

Dilson Darío Torres (born May 31, 1970) is a Venezuelan former pitcher in Major League Baseball who played for the Kansas City Royals in their 1995 season. Listed at 6' 3", 200 lb., Torres batted and threw right-handed. He was born in Maracay, Aragua.

== See also ==
- List of players from Venezuela in Major League Baseball
