= Mark Acre =

American baseball player (born 1968)

- Pitcher
- Born: September 16, 1968 (age 57); Concord, California, U.S.
- Batted: Right Threw: Right

Professional debut
- MLB: May 13, 1994, for the Oakland Athletics
- NPB: May 5, 1998, for the Yakult Swallows

Last appearance
- MLB: May 10, 1997, for the Oakland Athletics
- NPB: September 5, 1998, for the Yakult Swallows

MLB statistics
- Win–loss record: 9–6
- Earned run average: 5.17
- Strikeouts: 98

NPB statistics
- Win–loss record: 0–2
- Earned run average: 2.34
- Strikeouts: 58
- Stats at Baseball Reference

Teams
- Oakland Athletics (1994–1997); Yakult Swallows (1998)

Mark Robert Acre (born September 16, 1968) is an American former professional baseball pitcher. He attended New Mexico State University, where he played both baseball and basketball. Acre signed with the Oakland Athletics of Major League Baseball (MLB) as a non-drafted free agent in August 1991. He played all or part of four seasons for the Athletics from 1994–1997. He also played one season for the Yakult Swallows of the Nippon Professional Baseball (NPB) in 1998.
