= Brian Maxcy =

American baseball player (born 1971)

- Pitcher
- Born: May 4, 1971 (age 55); Amory, Mississippi, U.S.
- Batted: Right Threw: Right

MLB debut
- May 26, 1995, for the Detroit Tigers

Last MLB appearance
- April 25, 1996, for the Detroit Tigers

MLB statistics
- Win–loss record: 4–5
- Earned run average: 7.28
- Strikeouts: 21
- Stats at Baseball Reference

Teams
- Detroit Tigers (1995–1996)

David Brian Maxcy (born May 4, 1971) is an American former Major League Baseball pitcher who played for the Detroit Tigers for two seasons. He pitched 41 games during the 1995 Detroit Tigers season, and pitched two more during the 1996 Detroit Tigers season.
