= Ben Blomdahl =

American baseball player (born 1970)

- Pitcher
- Born: December 30, 1970 (age 55); Long Beach, California, U.S.
- Batted: Right Threw: Right

MLB debut
- April 28, 1995, for the Detroit Tigers

Last MLB appearance
- September 30, 1995, for the Detroit Tigers

MLB statistics
- Win–loss record: 0–0
- Earned run average: 7.77
- Strikeouts: 15
- Stats at Baseball Reference

Teams
- Detroit Tigers (1995)

Benjamin Earl Blomdahl (born December 30, 1970) is an American former Major League Baseball pitcher. Blomdahl played for the Detroit Tigers in 1995. Blomdahl never won a game in the majors but did pick up one save. It came on September 27, 1995, during a game against the Boston Red Sox. Blomdahl recorded the final out of the game to hold down a 7-5 Tigers victory. Blomdahl made 14 appearances in the major leagues, all in relief.
