= Jim Pittsley =

American baseball player (born 1974)

- Pitcher
- Born: April 3, 1974 (age 51); DuBois, Pennsylvania, U.S.
- Batted: Right Threw: Right

MLB debut
- May 23, 1995, for the Kansas City Royals

Last MLB appearance
- July 18, 1999, for the Milwaukee Brewers

MLB statistics
- Win–loss record: 7–12
- Earned run average: 6.02
- Strikeouts: 116
- Stats at Baseball Reference

Teams
- Kansas City Royals (1995, 1997–1999); Milwaukee Brewers (1999)

James Michael Pittsley (born April 3, 1974), is a retired Major League Baseball player who played pitcher from 1995-1999. He played for the Kansas City Royals and Milwaukee Brewers. James Pittsley was drafted out of DuBois Area High School. He was drafted by the Kansas City Royals in the 1992 MLB draft (17th pick overall). Pittsley was a highly touted prospect but was injured early in his career, and he only won seven major league games.
