= Brent Cookson =

American baseball player (born 1969)

- Outfielder
- Born: September 7, 1969 (age 56); Van Nuys, California
- Batted: Right Threw: Right

Professional debut
- MLB: August 12, 1995, for the Kansas City Royals
- KBO: May 29, 2000, for the LG Twins

Last appearance
- MLB: June 13, 1999, for the Los Angeles Dodgers
- KBO: May 13, 2003, for the LG Twins

MLB statistics
- Batting average: .150
- Home runs: 0
- Runs batted in: 5

KBO statistics
- Batting average: .219
- Home runs: 8
- Runs batted in: 25
- Stats at Baseball Reference

Teams
- Kansas City Royals (1995); Los Angeles Dodgers (1999); LG Twins (2000, 2003)

Brent Adam Cookson (born September 7, 1969) is a former professional baseball outfielder. He played parts of two seasons in Major League Baseball and parts of two seasons in the Korea Baseball Organization.
