= Jon Nunnally =

American baseball player (born 1971)

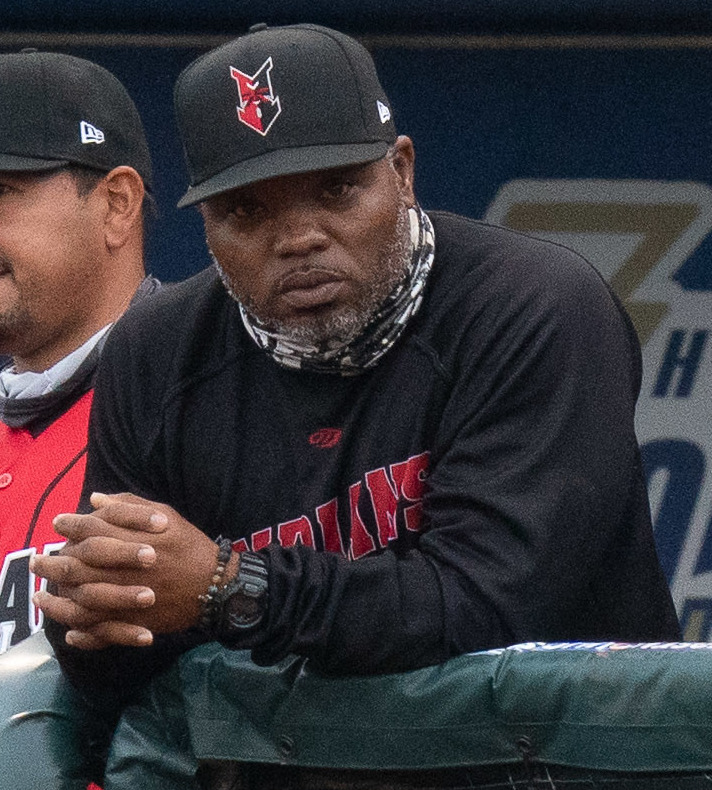
- Nunnally with the Indianapolis Indians in 2021
- Outfielder
- Born: November 9, 1971 (age 54); Pelham, North Carolina, U.S.
- Batted: Left Threw: Right

Professional debut
- MLB: April 26, 1995, for the Kansas City Royals
- NPB: June 28, 2000, for the Orix BlueWave

Last appearance
- MLB: May 31, 2000, for the New York Mets
- NPB: October 16, 2000, for the Orix BlueWave

MLB statistics
- Batting average: .246
- Home runs: 42
- Runs batted in: 125
- Stats at Baseball Reference

Teams
- Kansas City Royals (1995–1997); Cincinnati Reds (1997–1998); Boston Red Sox (1999); New York Mets (2000); Orix BlueWave (2000)

Jonathan Keith Nunnally (born November 9, 1971) is an American former professional baseball outfielder, power hitter and current baseball coach. He played in Major League Baseball (MLB) during the 1990s and early 2000s and later transitioned into coaching and player development roles at the Major League and minor league levels, including work as a Major League hitting coach and as a manager in the MLB Draft League.

== Early life and education ==
Nunnally attended high school at Hargrave Military Academy in Chatham, Virginia, where he competed as a multi-sport athlete in football, baseball, golf, and track. While he received attention for his athletic ability in multiple sports, baseball remained his primary focus. At Hargrave, his hitting ability became a defining strength, and he developed primarily as a catcher and infielder during his high school years. He became a well-known local standout, receiving frequent coverage in regional newspapers, and was later recognized as a distinguished alumnus of the school.

Nunnally was initially drafted directly out of high school by the Baltimore Orioles in the 39th round of the 1990 Major League Baseball Draft, but he did not sign, choosing instead to continue his development at the collegiate level.

For college, Nunnally attended Miami Dade College, where he transitioned from catcher to the outfield and emerged as one of the top junior college hitters in the country. Batting left-handed while throwing right-handed, he posted a .410 batting average and was named Junior College Conference Player of the Year, drawing national attention for his offensive production.

Following his standout season at Miami Dade College, Nunnally was selected by the Cleveland Indians in the third round of the 1992 Major League Baseball Draft, marking the beginning of his professional baseball career.

== Playing career ==
=== Major League career ===
Nunnally began his career within the Cleveland Indians organization before being selected by the Kansas City Royals in the 1994 Rule 5 Draft. He made his Major League Baseball debut on April 29, 1995, hitting a home run in his first at-bat off New York Yankees pitcher Melido Perez.

Between 1995 and 2000, Nunnally played in Major League Baseball for the Kansas City Royals, Cincinnati Reds, Boston Red Sox, New York Mets, and Pittsburgh Pirates. Over the course of his major-league career, he appeared in 371 games, recording 42 home runs and 137 runs batted in.

During portions of his Major League Baseball career, Nunnally was frequently utilized as a pinch hitter, often entering games in late-inning, high-leverage situations. This role limited his overall number of plate appearances compared to everyday position players, while emphasizing his ability to deliver immediate offensive production against relief pitching.

In addition to his pinch-hitting duties, Nunnally also saw regular action in the outfield, primarily at the corner positions, where he provided defensive depth while contributing offensively when called upon. His versatility allowed teams to deploy him both as a late-game offensive option and as an outfield contributor as roster needs required.

Between 1998 and 2000, Nunnally spent much of his time within the New York Mets organization, including extended periods at the Triple-A level, while continuing to move between the major and minor leagues. His offensive production during these seasons kept him in consistent consideration for major-league call-ups. During the 2000 season, he received national attention during New York Mets spring training, with media coverage highlighting his hitting performance and potential role on the major-league roster.

Throughout his Major League tenure, Nunnally experienced frequent roster movement, including late-season transactions and assignments, reflecting common roster management practices of the era.

In 2005, Nunnally received a 15-game suspension following a positive test for furosemide, a prescription diuretic that he had been medically prescribed; the test was administered prior to his assignment to the Indianapolis Indians, though the results were reported while he was playing for the club. He later returned following the suspension and continued his career in the minor leagues.

=== Minor League career ===
Across his minor-league career, which extended through 2005, Nunnally played primarily at the Double-A and Triple-A levels within the Cleveland Indians, Kansas City Royals, Cincinnati Reds, New York Mets, and Pittsburgh Pirates organizations. At the upper levels of the minor leagues, he was regularly utilized in everyday roles and remained in frequent consideration for major-league call-ups.

Over the course of his minor-league career, Nunnally appeared in more than 1,300 games and recorded over 200 home runs, totals that substantially exceeded his Major League Baseball power output and reflected his sustained run production and middle-of-the-order usage at the highest levels of the minor leagues.

=== International career ===
In addition to his Major League and minor league career, Nunnally played professionally in international leagues, including stints in Japan and Latin America. His international experience extended his playing career and allowed him to compete in different professional baseball environments, where veteran hitters are often relied upon for offensive production and leadership.

== Coaching career ==
Following his professional playing career, Nunnally transitioned into coaching and player development roles within professional baseball organizations. During the early stages of his coaching career, he worked at both the Major League and minor league levels with several organizations, including the Los Angeles Angels, Cleveland Indians, Toronto Blue Jays, and Boston Red Sox.

His coaching philosophy was shaped by the veteran players and coaches he worked alongside throughout his professional career, with an emphasis on preparation, offensive approach, and in-game adjustment.

While with the Los Angeles Angels, Nunnally worked in a roving instructional role focused on outfield play and baserunning, operating across multiple levels of the organization to support player development and on-field instruction.

With the Cleveland Indians, Nunnally worked as a Major League hitting coach, contributing to offensive preparation and in-game hitting instruction at the major-league level.

He later held coaching and instructional roles within the Toronto Blue Jays and Boston Red Sox organizations, working in player development capacities that emphasized hitter preparation and offensive instruction at the professional level.

In 2019, Nunnally joined the Pittsburgh Pirates organization in player development roles at the upper levels of the minor leagues. He worked as the hitting coach for the Altoona Curve, the Pirates’ Double-A affiliate, during the 2020 season. In 2021, he moved to the Indianapolis Indians, the Pirates’ Triple-A affiliate, where he continued as hitting coach. Nunnally returned to Altoona in 2022 and remained with the Curve as hitting coach through the 2023 season, also contributing to outfield instruction during his tenure.

During his time with the Pirates organization, Nunnally was referenced in media coverage discussing offensive instruction and player development involving professional players at both the minor-league and major-league levels.

In 2025, Nunnally managed the West Virginia Black Bears of the MLB Draft League. The Black Bears won the 2025 MLB Draft League championship, defeating the State College Spikes in the title game.
