= Ricardo Jordan =

American baseball player (born 1970)

- Pitcher
- Born: June 27, 1970 (age 56); Boynton Beach, Florida, U.S.
- Batted: Left Threw: Left

MLB debut
- June 23, 1995, for the Toronto Blue Jays

Last MLB appearance
- April 13, 1998, for the Cincinnati Reds

MLB statistics
- Win–loss record: 5–4
- Earned run average: 5.25
- Strikeouts: 47
- Stats at Baseball Reference

Teams
- Toronto Blue Jays (1995); Philadelphia Phillies (1996); New York Mets (1997); Cincinnati Reds (1998)

Ricardo Jordan (born June 27, 1970) is a former Major League Baseball pitcher. He played parts of four seasons in the majors, from 1995 until 1998, for four teams. Jordan was strictly a relief pitcher during his career, making 69 career appearances. He won five games and his one MLB save came on July 31, 1995. He recorded the final out of the game, preserving a 6-3 Blue Jays victory over the Orioles.

Following his career, Jordan became involved with drugs, and in 2007 was sentenced to seven years in prison for drug trafficking.
