= John Doherty (pitcher) =

American baseball player (born 1967)

- Pitcher
- Born: June 11, 1967 (age 59); New York, New York, U.S.
- Batted: Right Threw: Right

MLB debut
- April 8, 1992, for the Detroit Tigers

Last MLB appearance
- April 15, 1996, for the Boston Red Sox

MLB statistics
- Win–loss record: 32–31
- Earned run average: 4.87
- Strikeouts: 177
- Stats at Baseball Reference

Teams
- Detroit Tigers (1992–1995); Boston Red Sox (1996)

John Harold Doherty (born June 11, 1967) is an American former professional baseball pitcher. He played in Major League Baseball (MLB) for the Detroit Tigers and Boston Red Sox.

A 1985 graduate of Eastchester High School in Eastchester, New York, Doherty was selected by the Detroit Tigers in the 1989 Major League Baseball draft out of Concordia College in New York. He reached the majors in 1992 with the Tigers, spending four years with them before moving to the Boston Red Sox (1996). In his rookie year, he went 7–4 with a 3.88 ERA and 11 starts. His most productive season came in 1993, when he recorded 14 wins with 63 strikeouts and three complete games in 184 2/3 innings – all career-numbers. After a subpar 1994 season, he was relegated to the bullpen. He also made three relief appearances for Boston in 1996, his last major league season.

In a five-season career, Doherty posted a 32–31 record with 177 strikeouts and a 4.87 ERA in 148 appearances, including 61 starts, five complete games, two shutouts, nine saves, and 523 1/3 innings of work.
