= Fausto Cruz =

Dominican baseball player (born 1972)

- Infielder
- Born: May 1, 1972 (age 53); Monte Cristi, Dominican Republic
- Batted: Right Threw: Right

MLB debut
- April 10, 1994, for the Oakland Athletics

Last MLB appearance
- September 29, 1996, for the Detroit Tigers

MLB statistics
- Batting average: .191
- Hits: 17
- Runs batted in: 5
- Stats at Baseball Reference

Teams
- Oakland Athletics (1994–1995); Detroit Tigers (1996)

Fausto Santiago Cruz (born May 1, 1972) is a Dominican former Major League Baseball infielder. He played for the Oakland Athletics during the 1994 and 1995 seasons and the Detroit Tigers during the 1996 season.
