= List of Detroit Tigers coaches =

The following is a list of coaches, including role(s) and year(s) of service, for the Detroit Tigers franchise.

== Bench Coach ==
- Ed Brinkman: 1979
- Billy Consolo: 1979–1992
- Glenn Ezell: 1996
- Larry Parrish: 1997–1998
- Bob Melvin: 2000
- Doug Mansolino: 2001
- Felipe Alou: 2002
- Luis Pujols: 2002
- Kirk Gibson: 2003–2005
- Gene Lamont: 2013–2017
- Steve Liddle: 2018–2019
- Lloyd McClendon: 2020
- George Lombard: 2021–2023

== Hitting Coach ==
- Billy Hitchcock: 1957
- Gates Brown: 1978–1984
- Vada Pinson: 1985–1991
- Larry Herndon: 1992–1998
- Toby Harrah: 1998
- Alan Trammell: 1999
- Bill Madlock: 2000–2001
- Merv Rettenmund: 2002
- Bruce Fields: 2003–2005
- Don Slaught: 2006
- Lloyd McClendon: 2007–2013
- Wally Joyner: 2014–2016
- Lloyd McClendon: 2017–2019
- Joe Vavra: 2020
- Scott Coolbaugh: 2021–2022
- Keith Beauregard: 2023
- Michael Brdar: 2023

== Pitching Coach ==
- Willis Hudlin: 1957–1959
- Tom Ferrick: 1960–1963
- Stubby Overmire: 1963–1966
- Johnny Sain: 1967–1969
- Ted Kazanski: 1969
- Mike Roarke: 1970
- Art Fowler: 1971–1973
- Cot Deal: 1973–1974
- Steve Hamilton: 1975
- Fred Gladding: 1976–1978
- Johnny Grodzicki: 1979
- Roger Craig: 1980–1984
- Billy Muffett: 1985–1994
- Ralph Treuel: 1995
- Jon Matlack: 1996
- Rick Adair: 1996–1999
- Dan Warthen: 1999–2002
- Steve McCatty: 2002
- Bob Cluck: 2003–2005
- Chuck Hernandez: 2006–2008
- Rick Knapp: 2009–2011
- Jeff Jones: 2011–2015
- Rich Dubee: 2016–2017
- Chris Bosio: 2018 – June 26, 2018
- Rick Anderson: June 27, 2018 – 2020
- Chris Fetter: 2021–2023

== First Base Coach ==
- Schoolboy Rowe: 1954–1955
- Don Lund: 1957
- Tommy Henrich: 1958–1959
- Luke Appling: 1960
- Don Heffner: 1961
- Phil Cavarretta: 1962–1963
- Pat Mullin: 1963–1966
- Wally Moses: 1967–1970
- Frank Skaff: 1971:
- Dick Tracewski: 1972–1978
- Gates Brown: 1979
- Dick Tracewski: 1980–1991
- Gene Roof: 1992–1995
- Ron Oester: 1996
- Jerry White: 1997–1998
- Juan Samuel: 1999–2002
- Rafael Landestoy: 2002
- Mick Kelleher: 2003–2005
- Andy Van Slyke: 2006–2009
- Tom Brookens: 2010–2012
- Rafael Belliard: 2013
- Omar Vizquel: 2014–2017
- Ramón Santiago: 2018–2019
- Dave Clark: 2020
- Ramón Santiago: 2021 – July 16, 2021
- Kimera Bartee: July 17, 2021 – December 20, 2021
- Gary Jones: 2022

== Third Base Coach ==
- Billy Hitchcock: 1955–1960
- Phil Cavarretta: 1961
- George Myatt: 1962–1963
- Bob Swift: 1963–1966
- Frank Skaff: 1966
- Tony Cuccinello: 1967–1968
- Grover Resinger: 1969–1970
- Joe Schultz Jr.: 1971–1976
- Fred Hatfield: 1977–1978
- Dick Tracewski: 1979
- Alex Grammas: 1980–1991
- Dick Tracewski: 1992–1995
- Terry Francona: 1996
- Perry Hill: 1997–1999
- Doug Mansolino: 2000
- Lance Parrish: 2001
- Doug Mansolino: 2002
- Juan Samuel: 2002–2005
- Gene Lamont: 2006–2012
- Tom Brookens: 2013
- Dave Clark: 2014–2019
- Ramón Santiago: 2020
- Chip Hale: 2021 – July 5, 2021
- Ramón Santiago: July 17, 2021 – 2022

== Bullpen Coach ==
- Mike Roarke: 1965–1966
- Hal Naragon: 1967–1969
- Len Okrie: 1970
- Charlie Silvera: 1971–1973
- Jim Hegan: 1974–1978
- Dan Whitmer: 1992–1994
- Jeff Jones: 1995
- Fred Kendall: 1996–1998
- Jeff Jones: 1999–2000
- Ed Ott: 2001–2002
- Jeff Jones: 2002
- Lance Parrish: 2003–2005
- Lloyd McClendon: 2006
- Jeff Jones: 2007–2011
- Mike Rojas: 2011–2013
- Mick Billmeyer: 2014–2017
- Rick Anderson: 2018 – June 26, 2018
- A. J. Sager: June 27, 2018 – 2019
- Jeff Pico: 2019–2020

== Others ==
- Rafael Belliard: 2006–2009 (infield coach)
- Darnell Coles: 2014 (assistant hitting coach)
- David Newhan: 2015–2016 (assistant hitting coach)
- Leon Durham: 2017 (assistant hitting coach)
- Omar Vizquel: 2017 (infield/base running coach)
- Phil Clark: 2018–2020 (assistant hitting coach)
- Joe Vavra: 2018–2019 (quality control coach)
- Josh Paul: 2020–2021 (quality control coach)
- Juan Nieves: 2021–2022 (assistant pitching coach)
- José Cruz Jr.: 2021 (assistant hitting coach)
- Mike Hessman: 2021–2022 (assistant hitting coach)
- Robin Lund: 2023 (assistant pitching coach)
- James Rowson: 2023 (assistant hitting coach)
