= 1995 Chicago White Sox season =

1995 Chicago White Sox
- League: American League
- Division: Central
- Ballpark: Comiskey Park
- City: Chicago
- Owners: Jerry Reinsdorf
- General managers: Ron Schueler
- Managers: Gene Lamont and Terry Bevington
- Television: WGN-TV; SportsChannel Chicago (Ken Harrelson, Tom Paciorek)
- Radio: WMAQ (AM) (John Rooney, Ed Farmer); WIND (AM) (Hector Molina, Chico Carrasquel)

The 1995 Chicago White Sox season was the White Sox's 96th season. They finished with a record of 68–76, good enough for third place in the American League Central, 32 games behind the first place Cleveland Indians.

== Offseason ==
- December 14, 1994: Jack McDowell was traded by the Chicago White Sox to the New York Yankees for a player to be named later and Keith Heberling (minors). The New York Yankees sent Lyle Mouton (April 22, 1995) to the Chicago White Sox to complete the trade.

== Regular season ==
=== Notable Transactions ===
- April 11, 1995: Chris Sabo was signed as a free agent with the Chicago White Sox.
- April 12, 1995: Dave Righetti signed as a free agent with the Chicago White Sox.
- May 18, 1995: John Kruk signed as a free agent with the Chicago White Sox.
- June 5, 1995: Chris Sabo was released by the Chicago White Sox.
- July 27, 1995: Jim Abbott was traded by the Chicago White Sox with Tim Fortugno to the California Angels for McKay Christensen, John Snyder, Andrew Lorraine, and Bill Simas.
- August 18, 1995: Atlee Hammaker was released by the Chicago White Sox.

=== 1995 Opening Day lineup ===
- Ray Durham, 2B
- Tim Raines, LF
- Frank Thomas, 1B
- Chris Sabo, DH
- Robin Ventura, 3B
- Mike Devereaux, RF
- Lance Johnson, CF
- Ron Karkovice, C
- Ozzie Guillén, SS
- Alex Fernandez, P

=== Season standings ===
AL Central
Team	W	L	Pct.	GB	Home	Road
Cleveland Indians	100	44	.694	—	54‍–‍18	46‍–‍26
Kansas City Royals	70	74	.486	30	35‍–‍37	35‍–‍37
Chicago White Sox	68	76	.472	32	38‍–‍34	30‍–‍42
Milwaukee Brewers	65	79	.451	35	33‍–‍39	32‍–‍40
Minnesota Twins	56	88	.389	44	29‍–‍43	27‍–‍45

=== Record vs. opponents ===
1995 American League record Source: MLB Standings Grid – 1995
Team	BAL	BOS	CAL	CWS	CLE	DET	KC	MIL	MIN	NYY	OAK	SEA	TEX	TOR
Baltimore	—	4–9	9–4	6–1	2–10	8–5	4–5	7–5	3–6	6–7	5–7	6–7	4–1	7–6
Boston	9–4	—	11–3	5–3	6–7	8–5	3–2	8–4	5–4	5–8	8–4	7–5	3–4	8–5
California	4–9	3–11	—	10–2	3–2	6–2	5–7	5–2	8–5	7–5	6–7	7–6	6–7	8–2
Chicago	1–6	3–5	2–10	—	5–8	8–4	8–5	6–7	10–3	3–2–1	7–5	4–9	5–7	6–5
Cleveland	10–2	7–6	2–3	8–5	—	10–3	11–1	9–4	9–4	6–6	7–0	5–4	6–3	10–3
Detroit	5–8	5–8	2–6	4–8	3–10	—	3–4	8–5	7–5	5–8	2–3	5–5	4–8	7–6
Kansas City	5–4	2–3	7–5	5–8	1–11	4–3	—	10–2	6–7	3–7	5–8	7–5	8–6	7–5
Milwaukee	5–7	4–8	2–5	7–6	4–9	5–8	2–10	—	9–4	5–6	7–2	3–2	5–7	7–5
Minnesota	6–3	4–5	5–8	3–10	4–9	5–7	7–6	4–9	—	3–4	5–7	4–8	5–8	1–4
New York	7–6	8–5	5–7	2–3–1	6–6	8–5	7–3	6–5	4–3	—	4–9	4–9	6–3	12–1
Oakland	7–5	4–8	7–6	5–7	0–7	3–2	8–5	2–7	7–5	9–4	—	7–6	5–8	3–7
Seattle	7–6	5–7	6–7	9–4	4–5	5–5	5–7	2–3	8–4	9–4	6–7	—	10–3	3–4
Texas	1–4	4–3	7–6	7–5	3–6	8–4	6–8	7–5	8–5	3–6	8–5	3–10	—	9–3
Toronto	6–7	5–8	2–8	5–6	3–10	6–7	5–7	5–7	4–1	1–12	7–3	4–3	3–9	—

=== Roster ===
1995 Chicago White Sox
Roster
Pitchers: 25 Jim Abbott; 40 Wilson Álvarez; 49 Luis Andújar; 37 James Baldwin; 46 Jason Bere; 51 Mike Bertotti; 42 Rodney Bolton; 48 José DeLeón; 49 Rob Dibble; 32 Alex Fernandez; 51 Tim Fortugno; 34 Atlee Hammaker; 39 Roberto Hernández; 60 Matt Karchner; 26 Brian Keyser; 34 Andrew Lorraine; 47 Isidro Márquez; 15 Kirk McCaskill; 31 Scott Radinsky; 45 Dave Righetti; 36 Scott Ruffcorn; 48 Jeff Shaw; 41 Bill Simas; 38 Mike Sirotka; 50 Larry Thomas	Catchers: 20 Ron Karkovice; 10 Mike LaValliere; 54 Barry Lyons; 53 Chris Tremie; Infielders: 33 Doug Brady; 5 Ray Durham; 12 Craig Grebeck; 13 Ozzie Guillén; 29 John Kruk; 7 Norberto Martin; 17 Chris Sabo; 27 Chris Snopek; 35 Frank Thomas; 23 Robin Ventura	Outfielders: 24 Mike Cameron; 8 Mike Devereaux; 1 Lance Johnson; 14 Dave Martinez; 28 Lyle Mouton; 24 Warren Newson; 30 Tim Raines	Manager: 18 Terry Bevington; 33 Gene Lamont; Coaches: 18 Terry Bevington (first base); 41 Jackie Brown (pitching); -- Don Cooper (pitching); 56 Roly de Armas (bullpen); 6 Walt Hriniak (hitting); 52 Ron Jackson (first base); -- Doug Mansolino (third base); 15 Joe Nossek (bench); 25 Mike Pazik (pitching); 64 Rick Peterson (bullpen)

== Game log ==
=== Regular season ===
Legend
	White Sox win
	White Sox loss
	White Sox tie
	Postponement
	Eliminated from playoff race
**Bold**	White Sox team member

1995 regular season game log: 68–76–1 (Home: 45–36; Away: 40–41–1)
April: 1–4 (Home: 0–1; Away: 1–3)

#	Date	Time (CT)	Opponent	Score	Win	Loss	Save	Time of Game	Attendance	Record	Box/ Streak

May: 10–15 (Home: 7–7; Away: 3–8)

#	Date	Time (CT)	Opponent	Score	Win	Loss	Save	Time of Game	Attendance	Record	Box/ Streak

June: 14–13 (Home: 9–4; Away: 5–9)

#	Date	Time (CT)	Opponent	Score	Win	Loss	Save	Time of Game	Attendance	Record	Box/ Streak

July: 12–16–1 (Home: 5–9; Away: 7–7–1)

#	Date	Time (CT)	Opponent	Score	Win	Loss	Save	Time of Game	Attendance	Record	Box/ Streak
—	July 11	7:40 p.m. CDT	**66th All-Star Game in Arlington, TX**								

August: 13–16 (Home: 9–8; Away: 4–8)

#	Date	Time (CT)	Opponent	Score	Win	Loss	Save	Time of Game	Attendance	Record	Box/ Streak

September: 17–12 (Home: 7–5; Away: 10–7)

#	Date	Time (CT)	Opponent	Score	Win	Loss	Save	Time of Game	Attendance	Record	Box/ Streak

October: 1–0 (Home: 1–0; Away: 0–0)

#	Date	Time (CT)	Opponent	Score	Win	Loss	Save	Time of Game	Attendance	Record	Box/ Streak

== Player stats ==
= Indicates team leader

= Indicates league leader

=== Batting ===
Note: G = Games played; AB = At bats; R = Runs scored; H = Hits; 2B = Doubles; 3B = Triples; HR = Home runs; RBI = Runs batted in; BB = Base on balls; SO = Strikeouts; AVG = Batting average; SB = Stolen bases

Player	G	AB	R	H	2B	3B	HR	RBI	BB	SO	AVG	SB
Doug Brady, 2B	12	21	4	4	1	0	0	3	2	4	.190	0
Mike Cameron, OF	28	38	4	7	2	0	1	2	3	15	.184	0
Mike Devereaux, OF	92	333	48	102	21	1	10	55	25	51	.306	6
Ray Durham, 2B	125	471	68	121	27	6	7	51	31	83	.257	18
Craig Grebeck, SS, 3B, 2B	53	154	19	40	12	0	1	18	21	23	.260	0
Ozzie Guillén, SS	122	415	50	103	20	3	1	41	13	25	.248	6
Lance Johnson, CF	142	607	98	186	18	12	10	57	32	31	.306	40
Ron Karkovice, C	113	323	44	70	14	1	13	51	39	84	.217	2
John Kruk, DH, 1B	45	159	13	49	7	0	2	23	26	33	.308	0
Mike LaValliere, C	46	98	7	24	6	0	1	19	9	15	.245	0
Barry Lyons, C, 1B, DH	27	64	8	17	2	0	5	16	4	14	.266	0
Norberto Martin, 2B, OF, 3B, SS, DH	72	160	17	43	7	4	2	17	3	25	.269	5
Dave Martinez, OF, 1B	119	303	49	93	16	4	5	37	32	41	.307	8
Lyle Mouton, OF, DH	58	179	23	54	16	0	5	27	19	46	.302	1
Warren Newson, RF, LF, DH	51	85	19	20	0	2	3	9	23	27	.235	1
Tim Raines, LF	133	502	81	143	25	4	12	67	70	52	.285	13
Chris Sabo, DH, 3B, 1B	20	71	10	18	5	0	1	8	3	12	.254	2
Chris Snopek, 3B, SS	22	68	12	22	4	0	1	7	9	12	.324	1
Frank Thomas, 1B, DH	145	493	102	152	27	0	40	111	136	74	.308	3
Chris Tremie, C	10	24	0	4	0	0	0	0	1	2	.167	0
Robin Ventura, 3B, 1B	135	492	79	145	22	0	26	93	75	98	.295	4
Team totals	145	5060	755	1417	252	37	146	712	576	767	.280	110

=== Pitching ===
Note: W = Wins; L = Losses; ERA = Earned run average; G = Games pitched; GS = Games started; SV = Saves; IP = Innings pitched; H = Hits allowed; R = Runs allowed; ER = Earned runs allowed; HR = Home runs allowed; BB = Walks allowed; K = Strikeouts

Player	W	L	ERA	G	GS	SV	IP	H	R	ER	HR	BB	K
Jim Abbott	6	4	3.36	17	17	0	112.1	116	50	42	10	36	45
Wilson Álvarez	8	11	4.32	29	29	0	175.0	171	96	84	21	97	118
Luis Andújar	2	1	3.26	5	5	0	30.1	26	12	11	4	16	9
James Baldwin	0	1	12.89	6	4	0	14.2	32	22	21	6	10	10
Jason Bere	8	15	7.19	27	27	0	137.2	151	120	110	21	112	110
Mike Bertotti	1	1	12.56	4	4	0	14.1	23	20	20	6	11	15
Rod Bolton	0	2	8.18	8	3	0	22.0	33	23	20	4	15	10
José DeLeón	5	3	5.19	38	0	0	67.2	60	41	39	10	30	53
Rob Dibble	0	1	6.28	16	0	1	14.1	7	10	10	1	29	16
Alex Fernandez	12	8	3.80	30	30	0	203.2	200	98	86	19	72	159
Tim Fortugno	1	3	5.59	37	0	0	38.2	30	24	24	7	21	24
Atlee Hammaker	0	0	12.79	13	0	0	6.1	11	9	9	2	9	3
Roberto Hernández	3	7	3.92	60	0	32	59.2	63	30	26	9	32	84
Matt Karchner	4	2	1.69	31	0	0	32.0	33	8	6	2	14	24
Brian Keyser	5	6	4.97	23	10	0	92.1	114	53	51	10	28	48
Andrew Lorraine	0	0	3.38	5	0	0	8.0	3	3	3	0	2	5
Isidro Márquez	0	1	6.75	7	0	0	6.2	9	5	5	3	2	8
Dave Martinez	0	0	0.00	1	0	0	1.0	0	0	0	0	2	0
Kirk McCaskill	6	4	4.89	55	1	2	81.0	97	50	44	10	37	50
Scott Radinsky	2	1	5.45	46	0	1	38.0	46	23	23	7	21	14
Dave Righetti	3	2	4.20	10	9	0	49.1	65	24	23	6	18	29
Scott Ruffcorn	0	0	7.88	4	0	0	8.0	10	7	7	0	13	5
Jeff Shaw	0	0	6.52	9	0	0	9.2	12	7	7	2	1	6
Bill Simas	1	1	2.57	14	0	0	14.0	15	5	4	1	12	16
Mike Sirotka	1	2	4.19	6	6	0	34.1	39	16	16	2	17	19
Larry Thomas	0	0	1.32	17	0	0	13.2	8	2	2	1	7	12
Team totals	68	76	4.85	145	145	36	1284.2	1374	758	693	164	664	892

== Farm system ==
Level	Team	League	Manager
AAA	Nashville Sounds	American Association	Rick Renick
AA	Birmingham Barons	Southern League	Terry Francona
A	Prince William Cannons	Carolina League	Dave Huppert
A	South Bend Silver Hawks	Midwest League	Fred Kendall
A	Hickory Crawdads	South Atlantic League	Mike Rojas
Rookie	GCL White Sox	Gulf Coast League	Mike Gellinger
