= Steve Liddle =

American baseball coach

- Catcher / Coach
- Born: March 4, 1959 (age 67); Nashville, Tennessee, U.S.
- Bats: Right Throws: Right
- Stats at Baseball Reference

Teams
- As Coach: Minnesota Twins (2002–2012); Detroit Tigers (2018–2019)

Steven Michael Liddle (born March 4, 1959) is an American former professional baseball player, coach and manager.

== Coaching career ==
Liddle was hired as the bench coach of the Minnesota Twins in January 2002 as part of new manager Ron Gardenhire's staff. He served as the bench coach from 2002–2010 before swapping roles with Scott Ullger and becoming the Twins' third base coach for 2011 and 2012. In October 2012, after two 96-plus-loss seasons, it was announced Liddle's contract would not be renewed, thus ending his stint in Minnesota.

On November 2, 2017, Liddle was named the bench coach for the Detroit Tigers for the 2018 season, a role he previously had with Ron Gardenhire and the Twins. After the 2019 season, Liddle retired and was succeeded by Lloyd McClendon.

Preceded by Scott Ullger	Minnesota Twins Third Base Coach; 2010–2012	Succeeded by Joe Vavra
Preceded by Gene Lamont	Detroit Tigers bench coach 2018–2019	Succeeded by Lloyd McClendon
