= Scott Ullger =

American baseball player and coach (born 1955)

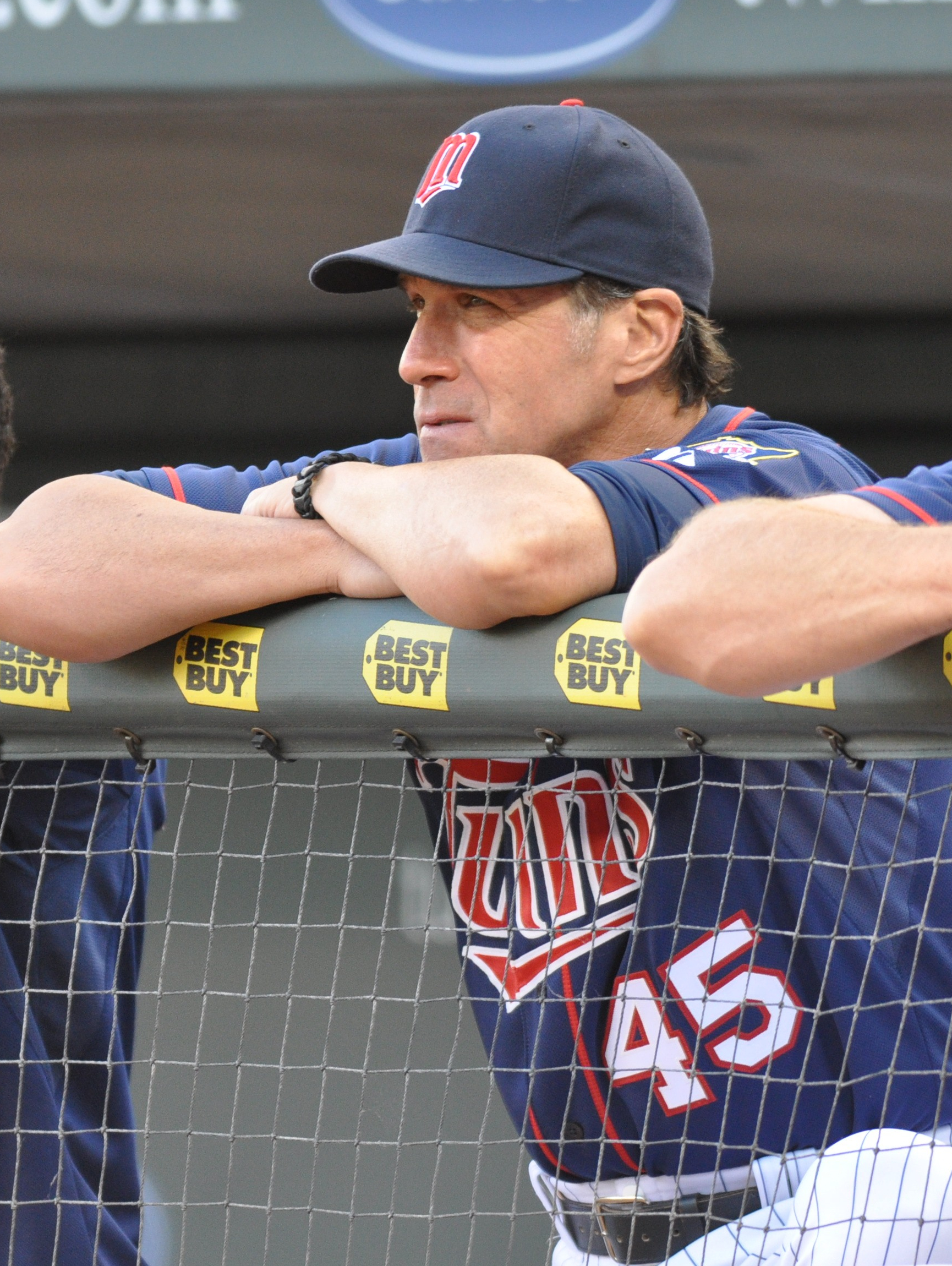
- First baseman / Coach
- Born: June 10, 1955 (age 71); New York City, U.S.
- Batted: Right Threw: Right

MLB debut
- April 17, 1983, for the Minnesota Twins

Last MLB appearance
- September 30, 1983, for the Minnesota Twins

MLB statistics
- Batting average: .190
- Home runs: 0
- Runs batted in: 5
- Stats at Baseball Reference

Teams
- As player: Minnesota Twins (1983); As coach: Minnesota Twins (1995–2014)

Scott Matthew Ullger (/ˈʌldʒər/ UL-jər; born June 10, 1955) is an American former Major League Baseball player and coach. He spent 20 seasons (1995–2014) as a coach for the Minnesota Twins of Major League Baseball, serving in four different roles: as third base and first base coach, bench coach and hitting instructor. Ullger was frequently referred to as "Scotty" by Twins faithfuls and by broadcasters Bert Blyleven and Dick Bremer.

Ullger, from Plainview, New York, was drafted by the Twins in the 18th round (456th overall) of the 1977 Major League Baseball draft. After a successful minor league career, he was called up in 1983. He started out his career by going hitless in his first 19 at-bats before recording his first career hit and RBI against Kansas City Royals pitcher Steve Renko on June 8. Ullger played in 35 career games, all in the 1983 season, batting .190 with four doubles, 5 RBI and five walks in 85 career plate appearances. Defensively, Ullger primarily appeared at first base, starting 17 games, but he also appeared in three games at third base.

After his playing career, he got into coaching. Ullger became the manager of the Visalia Oaks in 1988, becoming the California League Manager of the Year in 1990. He also had successful runs with the Portland Beavers/Salt Lake Buzz when the team was the Twins' Triple-A affiliate.

On October 7, 1994, Ullger was named the Twins' first base coach. He went 3–2 in a brief unofficial managerial stint in 2002, while manager Ron Gardenhire was absent. Following the 2005 season, Ullger was shifted and became the Twins’ new third base coach, a position which he held through the 2010 season. In December 2010, it was announced he would become the Twins' bench coach, swapping roles with Steve Liddle. This allowed him to work more closely with manager Ron Gardenhire.

In May 2008, Ullger managed the team for five games due to the death of Ron Gardenhire's brother Mike, and for a road game in New York at the end of the month while Gardenhire attended his daughter's high school graduation.

Sporting positions
| Preceded by Ron Gardenhire; Al Newman | Minnesota Twins third base coach 1995–1998; 2006–2010 | Succeeded by Ron Gardenhire; Steve Liddle |
| Preceded by Terry Crowley | Minnesota Twins hitting coach 1999–2005 | Succeeded by Joe Vavra |
| Preceded by Steve Liddle | Minnesota Twins bench coach 2011–2012 | Succeeded by Terry Steinbach |
| Preceded by Jerry White | Minnesota Twins first base coach 2013–2014 | Succeeded by Butch Davis |
