= Terry Bevington =

American baseball manager

- Manager
- Born: July 7, 1956 (age 70); Akron, Ohio, U.S.
- Bats: Right Throws: Right

MLB statistics
- Managerial record: 222–214
- Winning %: .509
- Managerial record at Baseball Reference

Teams
- As manager: Chicago White Sox (1995–1997); As coach: Chicago White Sox (1989–1995); Toronto Blue Jays (1999–2001)

Terry Paul Bevington (born July 7, 1956) is an American former professional baseball player, coach, and manager who managed the Chicago White Sox of Major League Baseball (MLB) from 1995 until 1997.

== Early life ==
Bevington was born in Akron, Ohio. His family moved to Santa Monica, California where he was a standout high school baseball player at Santa Monica High. He spent seven seasons in the minor leagues after being drafted by the New York Yankees in 1974. He batted .247 in 368 games played, including 33 with the Triple-A Vancouver Canadians of the Pacific Coast League in 1980. He threw and batted right-handed, stood 6 feet 2 inches (1.88 m) tall and weighed 190 pounds (86 kg).

== Managerial career ==
In the middle of the 1995 season, he was named manager of the White Sox when Gene Lamont was fired on June 2. He went 57–56 to close out the season (as a whole, the White Sox finished 75–76) and he was retained for the next season. Most notably during the year, he engaged in a fight with Milwaukee Brewers manager Phil Garner (as an attempt to protect Ozzie Guillen from Jeff Cirillo turned into putting Garner in a headlock) on July 22 that saw each get suspended for four games. He never particularly gelled with the players, coaches or the media, with one reporter later describing him as an "obfuscator". The White Sox attempted to replace him with Jim Leyland in 1997, but he instead managed with the Florida Marlins, which resulted in Chicago having to keep Bevington. Despite having players such as Frank Thomas and later Albert Belle, the White Sox failed to reach the postseason in his tenure (in contrast, Lamont had led them to the playoffs once in 1993).

One notable gaffe occurred in September 1997 that involved him signaling for a reliever to come into a game only to realize he had forgotten to warm them up in the first place, which resulted in sending in a reliever with no throws that had to deliver an intentional walk to get a reliever warmed up in the bullpen. After 2 1/2 seasons at the helm, he was fired on September 30, 1997 with a record of 222–214 (.509). He was replaced by Jerry Manuel. When attending the jersey retirement ceremony for Thomas in 2010, he received boos from the Chicago crowd.

He was a third base coach for the Toronto Blue Jays from 1999 through 2001 before returning to the minor leagues as a manager. He resigned as the Edmonton Cracker-Cats' skipper after a suspension stemming from an on-field brawl between the Cracker Cats and Calgary Vipers.

== Managerial record ==
Team	Year	Regular season					Postseason			
Team	Year	Games	Won	Lost	Win %	Finish	Won	Lost	Win %	Result
CWS	1995	113	57	56	.504	3rd in AL Central	–	–	–	–
CWS	1996	162	85	77	.525	2nd in AL Central	–	–	–	–
CWS	1997	161	80	81	.497	2nd in AL Central	–	–	–	–
Total		436	222	214	.509		0	0	–	

Sporting positions
Preceded by Duane Espy	Burlington Bees Manager; 1981	Succeeded by ??
Preceded by ???	Beloit Brewers Manager; 1982	Succeeded by Tim Nordbrook
Preceded by Duane Espy	Stockton Ports Manager; 1983	Succeeded by ???
Preceded by Lee Sigman	El Paso Diablos Manager; 1984–1985	Succeeded by Duffy Dyer
Preceded by Tom Trebelhorn	Vancouver Canadians Manager; 1986	Succeeded by Rocky Bridges
Preceded by Jack Lind	Denver Zephyrs Manager; 1987	Succeeded by Duffy Dyer
Preceded by Rocky Bridges	Vancouver Canadians Manager; 1988	Succeeded by Marv Foley
Preceded by	Chicago White Sox First Base Coach; 1989	Succeeded by Ron Clark
Preceded by Ron Clark	Chicago White Sox Third Base Coach; 1990–1995	Succeeded by Doug Mansolino
Preceded by Garth Iorg	Syracuse Sky Chiefs Manager; 1998	Succeeded by Pat Kelly
Preceded by Eddie Rodriguez	Toronto Blue Jays Third Base Coach; 1999–2001	Succeeded by Carlos Tosca
Preceded by Les Peden	Shreveport Sports Manager; 2003–2004	Succeeded by
Preceded by	Shreveport Sports Manager; 2008	Succeeded by Eddie Gerald
