= Lloyd McClendon =

American baseball player & coach (born 1959)

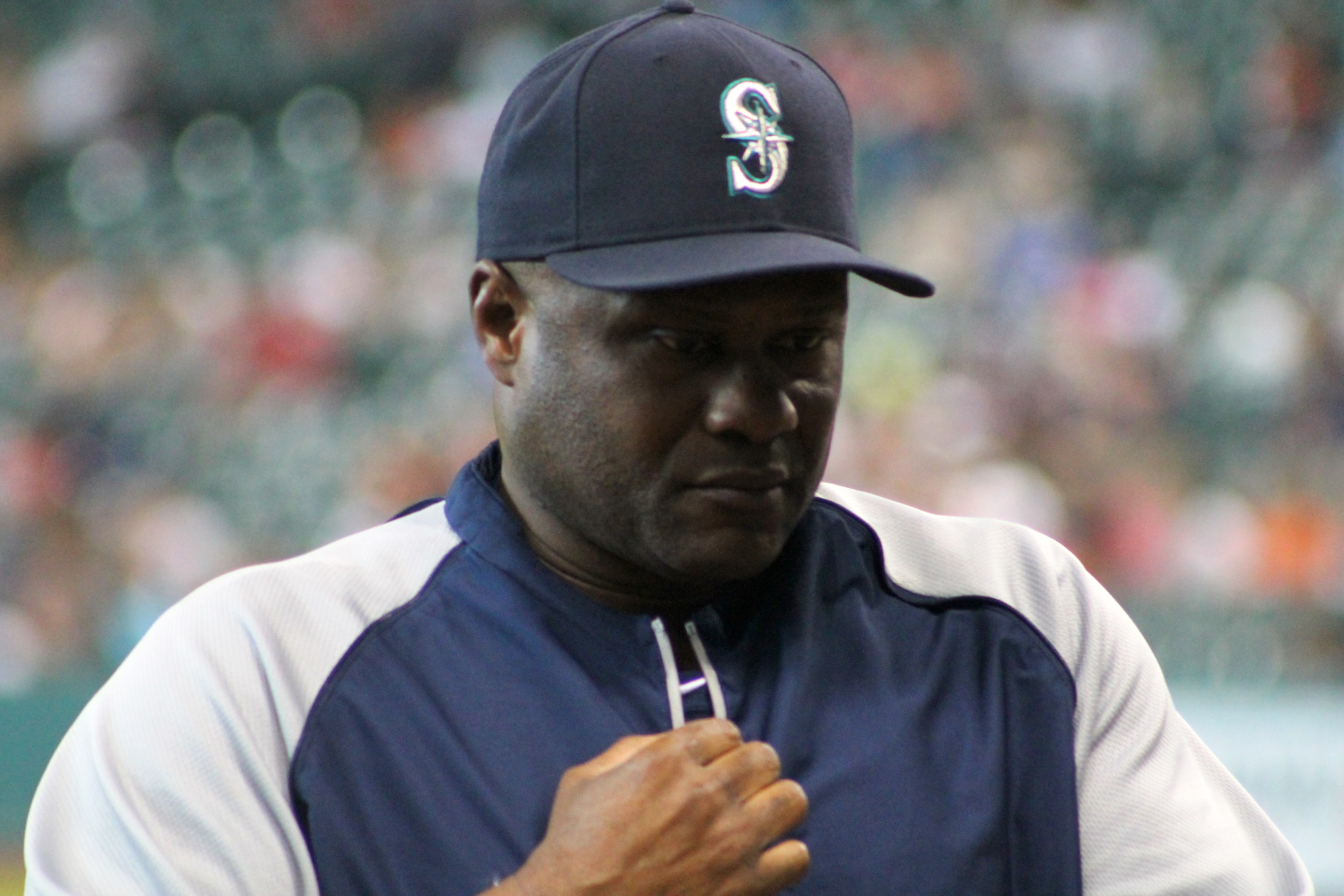
- McClendon with the Seattle Mariners

Saraperos de Saltillo
- Outfielder / Manager / Coach
- Born: January 11, 1959 (age 67); Gary, Indiana, U.S.
- Batted: Right Threw: Right

MLB debut
- April 6, 1987, for the Cincinnati Reds

Last MLB appearance
- August 11, 1994, for the Pittsburgh Pirates

MLB statistics
- Batting average: .244
- Home runs: 35
- Runs batted in: 154
- Managerial record: 501–613
- Winning %: .450
- Stats at Baseball Reference
- Managerial record at Baseball Reference

Teams
- As player: Cincinnati Reds (1987–1988); Chicago Cubs (1989–1990); Pittsburgh Pirates (1990–1994); As manager: Pittsburgh Pirates (2001–2005); Seattle Mariners (2014–2015); Detroit Tigers (2020); As coach: Pittsburgh Pirates (1997–2000); Detroit Tigers (2006–2013, 2017–2020)

Lloyd Glenn McClendon (born January 11, 1959) is an American former professional baseball outfielder, coach and manager who currently serves as the manager for the Saraperos de Saltillo of the Mexican League. He played in Major League Baseball (MLB) as an outfielder from 1987 to 1994 for the Cincinnati Reds, Chicago Cubs, and Pittsburgh Pirates.

After his playing career McClendon served as the manager of the Pittsburgh Pirates from 2001 to 2005 and the Seattle Mariners from 2014 to 2015. He most recently served as the interim manager for the Detroit Tigers in 2020.

== Playing career ==
=== Amateur career ===
In 1971, McClendon played in the Little League World Series for his hometown Gary, Indiana, team, and earned the nickname "Legendary Lloyd" by homering in five consecutive at bats. In fact, they were his only official at-bats; in all his other plate appearances, the opposing coaches had him intentionally walked. McClendon's 1971 team was the first all-African American team to reach the final stage of the LLWS. He attended Roosevelt High School in Gary and graduated in 1977.

McClendon played collegiate baseball at Valparaiso University, not far from Gary. While at Valparaiso, he compiled a career batting average of .330, and produced 18 home runs and 73 runs batted in. Twice he received all-conference honors (1979 and 1980).

=== Professional career ===
==== New York Mets ====
McClendon was drafted by the New York Mets in the 8th round of the 1980 Major League Baseball draft as a catcher. He began his professional baseball career with the Kingsport Mets of the Appalachian League.

While playing at the A ball level for the Lynchburg Mets, McClendon was roomed with teammate Darryl Strawberry by their manager, Gary Dusan, as Strawberry was struggling with adversity and McClendon a positive influence. 43 years later, shortly before Strawberry had his uniform number 18 retired by the New York Mets, Strawberry recalled in an interview how helpful both Dusan and McClendon had been helping him survive a particularly challenging season and enabling him to go on to a successful major league career.

After the 1982 season, he was traded along with two other players to the Cincinnati Reds in a deal to bring Mets legend Tom Seaver back to New York.

==== Cincinnati Reds ====
1983 was the first season in which McClendon began to get significant time at positions other than catcher, playing both third and first base while with the Waterbury Reds. He continued to be used as a utility player over the next several seasons, before finally breaking into the majors with the Reds in 1987.

McClendon made his major league debut on Opening Day in 1987 as a pinch hitter, He spent most of the season with the Reds, aside from a brief return to the minors with the Nashville Sounds in August. He played in 45 games, mostly as a pinch hitter, but also appeared at five different positions in the field (catcher, first base, third base, and left and right field).

1988 saw McClendon playing a similar role, although his playing time increased. He again played five positions on defense while batting .219 in 72 games overall. After the season, he was traded to the Chicago Cubs for outfielder Rolando Roomes.

==== Chicago Cubs ====
McClendon saw the most playing time of his major league career with the Cubs in 1989. Playing mostly left field and first base, he batted .286 with career highs in home runs with 12 and runs batted in with 40. He also scored a career-best 47 runs and even stole 6 bases.

McClendon struggled at the plate in 1990, however, playing in 49 games for the Cubs and batting an anemic .159. Late in the season, he was traded to the Pirates for a player to be named later.

==== Pittsburgh Pirates ====
McClendon played in 4 games for the Pirates at the end of 1990, going 1-for-3 at the plate. He played for the Pirates through the end of the 1994 season, spending most of his time in the outfield. In the 1992 postseason, he batted .727 while playing in five games of the 1992 National League Championship Series, collecting eight hits in eleven at-bats. It is the highest batting average posted in one postseason. He bounced back to hit .286 in 1991, but slumped to .253 in 1992 and .221 in 1993. He was hitting .239 in 1994 when the season was interrupted - and ultimately ended - by a players' strike. After the season he became a free agent.

==== Cleveland Indians ====
McClendon signed a minor league contract with the Cleveland Indians in 1995. After failing to make the team out of spring training, he was assigned to the Buffalo Bisons. He played 37 games, including his first games at third base since 1990. However, he never received a promotion to the majors, and retired after the season.

== Coaching and managerial career ==
=== Pittsburgh Pirates ===
After retiring from playing, McClendon served as a hitting coach for the Pirates until he was appointed manager after the 2000 season. At the time of his hiring, he became the first African American manager or head coach of any of Pittsburgh's three major sports teams, preceding the Steelers hiring of Mike Tomlin by six years. McClendon held the Pirates managerial position until he was fired September 6, 2005. In his five seasons as manager of the Pirates, McClendon compiled a 336–446 record.

=== Detroit Tigers ===
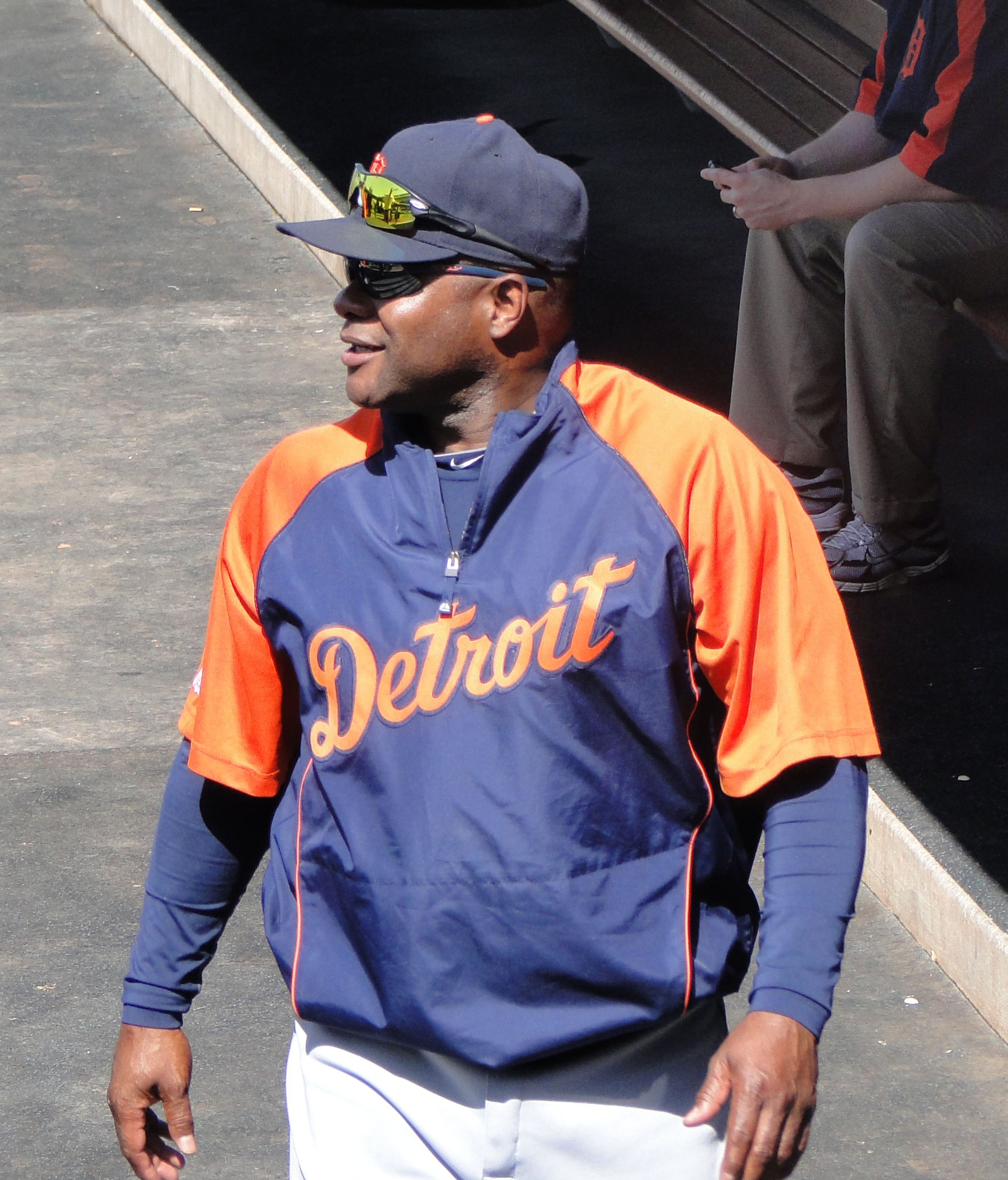
McClendon with the Tigers (2010)

When Jim Leyland was hired as manager of the Detroit Tigers, he brought former player McClendon on board as bullpen coach. For the 2007 season, he was promoted to hitting coach, replacing former Pirates teammate Don Slaught. On May 28, 2010, he changed his jersey number from 12 to 19 due to Gerald Laird changing his jersey number from 8 to 12.

The Tigers did not have an official bench coach until Gene Lamont was named to that position for the 2013 season, but McClendon served a part of that role as acting manager in the absence of Jim Leyland.

A Detroit player won the American League batting title in four of McClendon's seven seasons as the team's hitting coach.

=== Seattle Mariners ===
On November 5, 2013, the Puget Sound Business Journal reported that McClendon would be the new Seattle Mariners manager. On November 7, general manager Jack Zduriencik officially announced McClendon as the team's manager.

In McClendon's first season as the manager of the Mariners, the team finished with an 87–75 record. The team's record represented an improvement from 71–91 in 2013. However, in 2015, the Mariners struggled and finished 76–86; McClendon was fired on October 9, 2015. He finished with a record of 163 wins and 161 losses.

=== Detroit Tigers (second stint) ===
On November 23, 2015, McClendon was hired as the manager of the Triple-A affiliate of the Detroit Tigers, the Toledo Mud Hens. In the 2016 season, the Mud Hens struggled, finishing 68–76. Following that season, McClendon was named the Tigers' new hitting coach.

On October 21, 2016, McClendon was named the Tigers' hitting coach, a position he previously held with the team from 2007 to 2013. On September 30, 2019, McClendon succeeded Steve Liddle as the Tigers' bench coach. On September 19, 2020, McClendon was named interim manager of the Tigers following the retirement of Ron Gardenhire. After the 2020 season, the Tigers named A. J. Hinch as the team's new manager, and McClendon was not retained on the coaching staff.

On January 27, 2022, McClendon was hired to manage the Triple-A affiliate of the Detroit Tigers, the Toledo Mud Hens for a second time, following the promotion of Mud Hens manager Gary Jones to first base coach for the major league team.

=== Piratas de Campeche ===
On December 18, 2025, McClendon was hired to serve as the manager for the Piratas de Campeche of the Mexican League. He led the team to a 52–41 record, finishing in third place in the South Division. However, they were eliminated in the first round of the postseason by the Pericos de Puebla.

=== Saraperos de Saltillo ===
On November 11, 2026, McClendon was hired as manager for the Saraperos de Saltillo of the Mexican League.

=== History of challenging umpires ===
McClendon has a history of challenging close calls on the diamond, and stated his belief that the Pirates didn't always get fair calls from the umpires. As he put it during the 2002 season, "I'm sure it's nothing intentional on their part. I certainly would never question their integrity. But it's human nature to relax a little and take something for granted. We've lost for so long that I think it's easy for umpires to lose respect for us and take us for granted. I've got to change that. If I get thrown out of 100 games, then I get thrown out of 100 games. I'm going to keep demanding a playing field that's equal for my players. I don't think it's wrong to demand the umpires' best effort every day."

On June 26, 2001, in a game against the Milwaukee Brewers, McClendon saw two questionable calls made against his Pirates by the first base umpire, Rick Reed. After Jason Kendall was called out at first base, McClendon went onto the field to argue the call. After being ejected from the game, McClendon removed first base and walked off the field with it, later throwing it into the dugout, where a batboy placed a Pirates cap on top of it. Rather than risk McClendon's wrath by retrieving the base, the field crew replaced the base with a new one. The Pirates rallied to win the game in the 12th inning, 7–6. The next day, the players mounted the base in their clubhouse. McClendon's act of anger made the No. 4 place on ESPN.com Page 2's "Coaches Gone Wild" list, which jokingly called it an incident of "stealing" first.

In the 2005 season, McClendon exhibited signs of a desire to end this tendency. During a series against the Washington Nationals at the end of June, when replays of the first base theft were being shown on the scoreboard, he said, "I don't like that being shown, I don't want people to identify (that) with me. To me, that's ridiculous. That's not who I am. That's something that happened and it should be over with."

However, on June 2, 2015, McClendon once again made national news after challenging the entire umpire crew after a couple of questionable check-swing calls by Brett Gardner and Alex Rodriguez during the Mariners game against the New York Yankees. Mariners catcher Mike Zunino expressed displeasure with first base umpire Will Little's safe call on a check swing, leading to Zunino's ejection. McClendon initially argued with home plate umpire Mike DiMuro before throwing his hat and proceeding to argue with Little, eventually kicking his hat and running around the diamond to argue with each member of the umpiring crew.

=== Managerial interviews ===
Following their 2010 season, the Seattle Mariners interviewed McClendon, as well as several others, for their managerial position, with Seattle eventually deciding to hire Eric Wedge. On October 30, 2012, McClendon was interviewed by the Miami Marlins as a candidate to succeed Ozzie Guillén, who was fired after a single season. However, the Marlins hired Mike Redmond instead. On October 24, 2013, McClendon interviewed for the Tigers' managerial job, but that job went to Brad Ausmus. On November 3, 2013, McClendon was in Seattle for a second interview for the managerial job for the Mariners. He ultimately was hired by the Mariners as their new manager beginning in the 2014 season.

=== Managerial record ===
Team	Year	Regular season					Postseason			
Team	Year	Games	Won	Lost	Win %	Finish	Won	Lost	Win %	Result
PIT	2001	162	62	100	.383	6th in NL Central	–	–	–	–
PIT	2002	161	72	89	.447	4th in NL Central	–	–	–	–
PIT	2003	162	75	87	.463	4th in NL Central	–	–	–	–
PIT	2004	161	72	89	.447	5th in NL Central	–	–	–	–
PIT	2005	162	55	81	.404	(fired)	–	–	–	–
PIT total		782	336	446	.430					
SEA	2014	162	87	75	.537	3rd in AL West	–	–	–	–
SEA	2015	162	76	86	.469	4th in AL West	–	–	–	–
SEA total		324	163	161	.503					
DET	2020	8	2	6	.250	5th in AL Central	–	–	–	–
Total		1,114	501	613	.450					

== Personal life ==
McClendon is one of twelve or thirteen children. Sources differ.

McClendon met Ingrid Scott while the two were students at Valparaiso University; They went on to marry in 1981. The couple has two children, daughter Schenell (born c. 1983) and son Bo (born c. 1987). Schenell graduated Valparaiso, followed by law school, then married in 2014. Bo also attended Valparaiso, and was a 39th round draft choice the Detroit Tigers in 2010. He played in the minor leagues for two years.

Granddaughter Bryn was born to Schenell and her husband in 2019.

McClendon and his wife continue to live in Indiana.

Sporting positions
Preceded by Lance Parrish	Detroit Tigers bullpen coach 2006	Succeeded by Jeff Jones
Preceded by Don Slaught; Wally Joyner	Detroit Tigers hitting coach 2007–2013; 2017–2019	Succeeded by Wally Joyner; Joe Vavra
Preceded by Steve Liddle	Detroit Tigers bench coach 2020	Succeeded by Josh Paul
Preceded by Larry Parrish	Toledo Mud Hens manager 2016	Succeeded by Mike Rojas
