= Jeff Jones (pitcher) =

American baseball player and coach (born 1956)

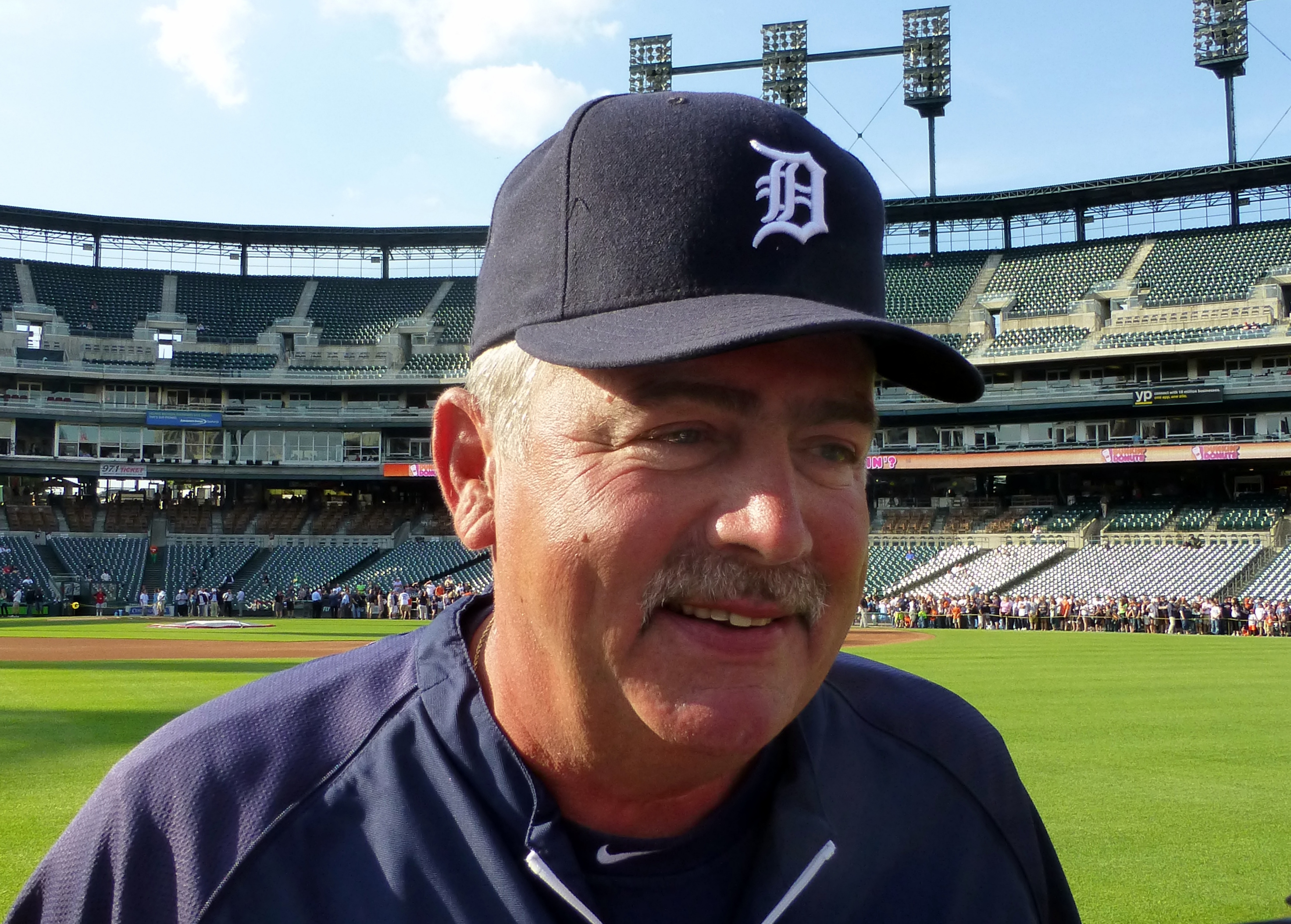
- Jones with the Detroit Tigers
- Pitcher
- Born: July 29, 1956 (age 69); Detroit, Michigan, U.S.
- Batted: Right Threw: Right

MLB debut
- April 10, 1980, for the Oakland Athletics

Last MLB appearance
- September 14, 1984, for the Oakland Athletics

MLB statistics
- Win–loss record: 9–9
- Earned run average: 3.95
- Strikeouts: 128
- Stats at Baseball Reference

Teams
- As player: Oakland Athletics (1980–1984); As coach: Detroit Tigers (1995, 1999–2000, 2002, 2007–2015)
Medals
Men's baseball
Representing United States
World Baseball Classic
| Gold medal – first place | 2017 Los Angeles | Team |

Jeffrey Allen Jones (born July 29, 1956) is an American former professional baseball pitcher and coach. He played in Major League Baseball (MLB) for the Oakland Athletics from 1980 until 1984. He served as pitching coach for the Detroit Tigers of MLB from 2011 to 2015.

== Personal ==
Born in Detroit, Michigan, Jeff graduated from nearby Southgate High School, (now Southgate Anderson High School) in Southgate, Michigan.

He has two grown daughters, Audrey and Whitney, and lives in Carleton, Michigan with his wife.

== Playing career ==
Jones pitched for five seasons in Oakland (1980–84), almost entirely out of the bullpen (three starts in 112 appearances). He compiled a 9–9 record and eight saves with a 3.95 ERA, striking out 128 batters in 205 innings.

== Coaching career ==
Jones was the pitching coach for the Double-A London Tigers in 1989, 1991 and 1992. He then went to the Triple-A Toledo Mud Hens in 1990 and 1994 to be their pitching coach.

After numerous stints as the Tigers bullpen coach, most recently 2007–2011, Jones was moved to the position of pitching coach on July 3, 2011. This followed the firing of pitching coach Rick Knapp, after a six-game stretch where Tiger pitchers gave up a combined 54 runs against the New York Mets and San Francisco Giants. Jones' contract expired at the end of the 2011 season, but the Tigers chose to tender a new contract to bring him back for 2012 and beyond.

On October 19, 2015, Jones announced his retirement, following 38 years in baseball. During his tenure as pitching coach, Jones coached two Tigers pitchers to Cy Young Awards, Justin Verlander in 2011, and Max Scherzer in 2013.

| Preceded by Dan Whitmer; Fred Kendall; Ed Ott; Lloyd McClendon | Detroit Tigers bullpen coach 1995; 1999–2000; 2002; 2007–2011 | Succeeded by Fred Kendall; Ed Ott; Lance Parrish; Mike Rojas |
| Preceded by Rick Knapp | Detroit Tigers pitching coach 2011–2015 | Succeeded by Rich Dubee |
