= Chris Snopek =

American baseball player (born 1970)

- Infielder
- Born: September 20, 1970 (age 54); Cynthiana, Kentucky, U.S.
- Batted: Right Threw: Right

MLB debut
- July 31, 1995, for the Chicago White Sox

Last MLB appearance
- September 27, 1998, for the Boston Red Sox

MLB statistics
- Batting average: .234
- Home runs: 13
- Runs batted in: 66
- Stats at Baseball Reference

Teams
- Chicago White Sox (1995–1998); Boston Red Sox (1998)

Chris Snopek
Medal record

Men's baseball

Representing United States

Baseball World Cup
Silver medal – second place	2001 Taipei	National team

Christopher Charles Snopek (born September 20, 1970) is a former Major League Baseball infielder. He is an alumnus of the University of Mississippi.

Drafted by the Chicago White Sox in the 6th round of the 1992 MLB amateur draft, Snopek would make his Major League Baseball debut with the Chicago White Sox on July 31, 1995, and appeared in his final game on September 27, 1998, for the Boston Red Sox.
