= Rodney Bolton =

American baseball player (born 1968)

- Pitcher
- Born: September 23, 1968 (age 57); Chattanooga, Tennessee, U.S.
- Batted: Right Threw: Right

MLB debut
- April 10, 1993, for the Chicago White Sox

Last MLB appearance
- September 19, 1995, for the Chicago White Sox

MLB statistics
- Win–loss record: 2–8
- Earned run average: 7.69
- Strikeouts: 27

NPB statistics
- Win–loss record: 2–2
- Earned run average: 6.39
- Strikeouts: 18
- Stats at Baseball Reference

Teams
- Chicago White Sox (1993, 1995); Fukuoka Daiei Hawks (1996)

Rodney Earl Bolton (born September 23, 1968) is an American former professional baseball pitcher. He played for two seasons in Major League Baseball (MLB) for the Chicago White Sox. He was drafted by the White Sox in the 13th round of the 1990 amateur draft. Bolton played his first professional season with their Class-A (Short Season) Utica Blue Sox and Class A South Bend White Sox in 1990, and his last with the Milwaukee Brewers' Triple-A Indianapolis Indians in 2001.
