= Gene Lamont =

American baseball player, coach, and manager (born 1946)

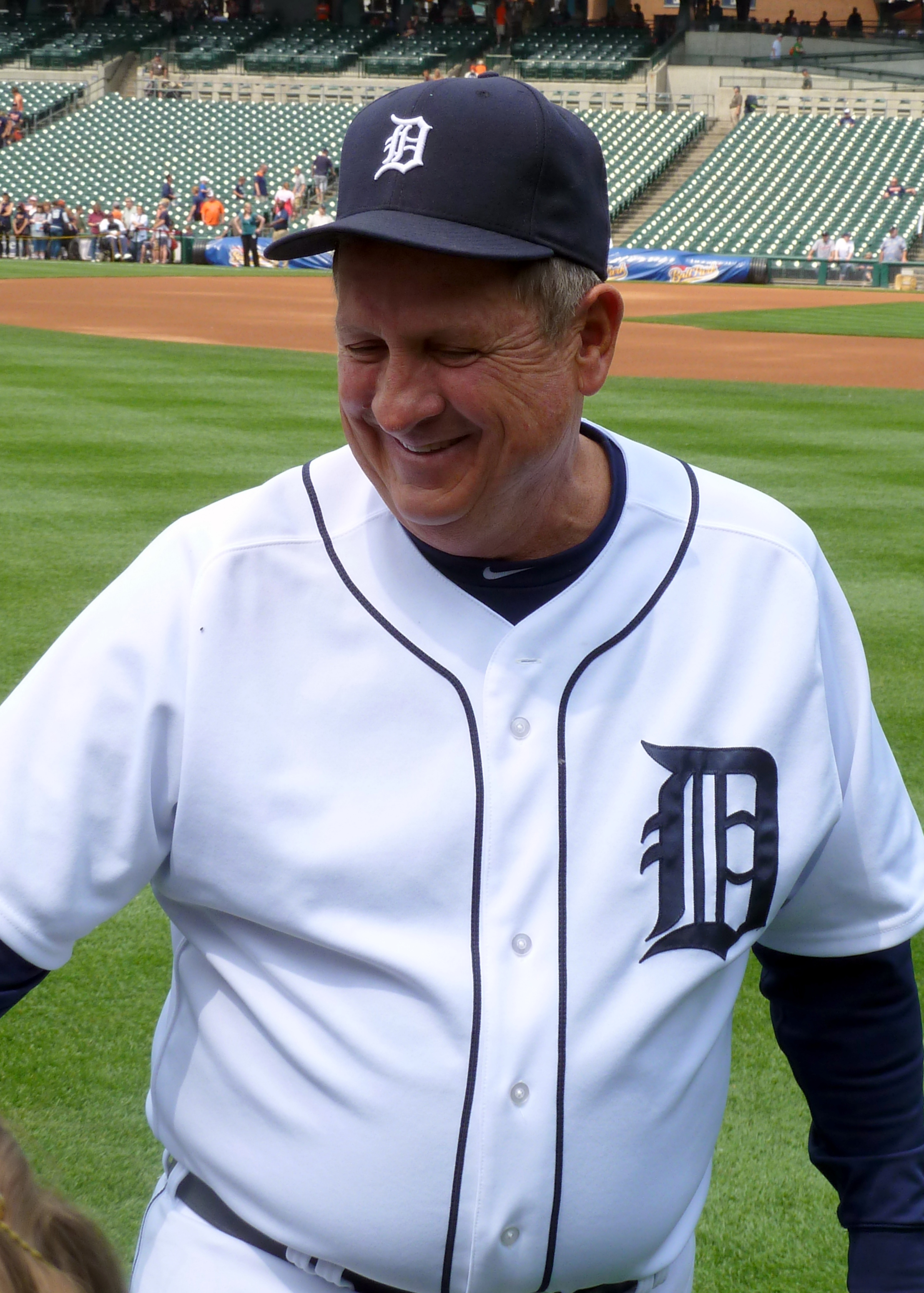
- Lamont with the Detroit Tigers in June 2013
- Catcher / Manager / Coach
- Born: December 25, 1946 (age 79); Rockford, Illinois, U.S.
- Batted: Left Threw: Right

MLB debut
- September 2, 1970, for the Detroit Tigers

Last MLB appearance
- May 24, 1975, for the Detroit Tigers

MLB statistics
- Batting average: .233
- Home runs: 4
- Runs batted in: 14
- Managerial record: 553–562
- Winning %: .496
- Stats at Baseball Reference
- Managerial record at Baseball Reference

Teams
- As player: Detroit Tigers (1970–1972, 1974–1975); As manager: Chicago White Sox (1992–1995); Pittsburgh Pirates (1997–2000); As coach: Pittsburgh Pirates (1986–1991, 1996); Boston Red Sox (2001); Houston Astros (2002–2004); Detroit Tigers (2006–2017); Pittsburgh Pirates (2025)

Career highlights and awards
- AL Manager of the Year (1993)

Gene William Lamont (born December 25, 1946) is an American former catcher and manager. He played professionally in Major League Baseball (MLB) for the Detroit Tigers and managed the Chicago White Sox (1992–1995) and Pittsburgh Pirates (1997–2000). He later served as a coach for the Tigers from 2006 to 2017. He batted left-handed and threw right-handed.

== Early life ==
Lamont was born in Rockford, Illinois on Christmas Day in 1946. He was a Chicago Cubs fan all his life, growing up in Kirkland, Illinois, and attending Western Illinois University.

== Playing career ==
He was selected by the Detroit Tigers in the 1st round, as the 13th pick, of the 1965 amateur draft, and came up with them as a September call-up in 1970, when he had 13 hits in 44 at bats. The following year, he had one hit in 15 at-bats. In his biggest year, he had 92 at-bats, playing as a backup to Tigers catcher Jerry Moses. He returned to the Tigers upon being selected from the Richmond Braves in the Rule 5 draft on December 3, 1973. After 1975, his major league career, spent entirely with the Tigers, was over. He bounced around in the minors, on triple-A Evansville (with such players as Tom Brookens and Jerry Manuel) before stopping. He ended with a lifetime batting average of .233, with four home runs and 14 RBI in 87 games played. He had 37 hits in 159 at-bats, and stole one base.

The highlight of his time as a player was a home run in his first at bat of his career off the Boston Red Sox' Cal Koonce.

== Managing career ==
In 1977 with the Kansas City Royals organization managing their single-A Fort Myers team for two years. After that, he guided the double-A Jacksonville Suns to a championship in 1982 and again in 1983, being named Southern League Manager of the Year in 1982.

Finally, after two seasons with the triple-A Omaha Royals in the minors, he worked his way up to the majors, serving as a third base coach for Jim Leyland's 1986 Pirates team. By the early '90s, with the Pirates emergence as a contender, Lamont was being considered by some teams for a managing job.

In 1992, Jeff Torborg left the White Sox to take the managing job with the New York Mets, and Lamont was named manager of Chicago. That year, the Sox did well, finishing 86–76, 3rd in the American League's Western Division. However, the following year the White Sox finished 94-68 under Lamont and were first in the AL West for the first time since they won 99 games in 1983 under Tony La Russa. His team consisted of such stars as Frank Thomas, Robin Ventura, Ellis Burks, Jack McDowell, Alex Fernandez, Jason Bere, and Wilson Álvarez. Lamont took home the AL Manager of the Year award that year, and the team lost in the American League Championship Series to the defending champions, the Toronto Blue Jays.

In 1994, a baseball strike took place. When it began, the White Sox had the best record in the division by a narrow margin over the Cleveland Indians. However, the team did not fare as well the following year, starting out with an 11–20 record before Lamont was fired by general manager Ron Schueler in a move that shocked Lamont. He was replaced by Terry Bevington, who had served as the third base coach.

Lamont returned to the Pirates and began coaching for his mentor Jim Leyland again, before Leyland left for the Florida Marlins after the 1996 season. Lamont was named the next Pirates manager in 1997. He was the third Pirates manager to have been a catcher during his playing career, along with Billy Meyer and Leyland. Amazingly, the 1997 Pirates - affectionately nicknamed "The Freak Show" for their $9 million dollar payroll and mix of young, inexperienced players and scrappy veterans who upset many NL teams vying for playoff spots - remained in contention until the final week of the season and finished second in the NL Central with a team that was widely predicted to finish last. Lamont came in 2nd place in the Manager of the Year voting behind Dusty Baker of the San Francisco Giants.

There was no continued success for the Pirates though, finishing in last place in the Central in 1998 after a late season freefall saw them lose 25 of their last 30 games.

In 1999, the Pirates traded for slugger Brian Giles and signed shortstop Pat Meares and third baseman Ed Sprague, who would represent the team in the All-Star Game that year. However, after a promising start, a hand injury to Meares and a broken ankle suffered by catcher Jason Kendall on the 4th of July likely cost the Pirates a winning season as the team would fade to a 78-83 finish.

Expectations were perhaps a tad too high from owner Kevin McClatchy, who thought the 2000 team (the last to play in Three Rivers Stadium before the opening of PNC Park) should win 90 games, with Lamont entering the season on the last year of his contract being a sign that improvement was necessary. After another injury-plagued season that saw the team's runs against drop from 9th-best in the majors in 1999 to 21st in 2000, resulting in 93 losses, Lamont was fired and replaced by Lloyd McClendon.

He has a career record of 553–562, barely below .500 at .496. His all-time record in Chicago was 258–210, and he was 295–352 in Pittsburgh. Lamont had two first-place finishes, including the strike shortened year.

Lamont returned to coaching, with the Red Sox, the Astros, and (from 2006–2017) with the Tigers.

On November 12, 2011, Lamont was interviewed for the manager position for the Boston Red Sox after the Red Sox declined to exercise Terry Francona's 2012 option for manager. Lamont joined Torey Lovullo, Sandy Alomar Jr., Pete Mackanin, and Dale Sveum vying for the managerial position. As of November 27, only Lamont and Bobby Valentine were still in contention for the position. On November 29, it was reported that Valentine would be the new Red Sox manager.

In 2013, Lamont was moved to the dugout as the bench coach and was replaced by Tom Brookens, who was previously the 1st base coach.

On January 17, 2018, Lamont was hired by the Kansas City Royals to be the special assistant to the general manager.

On May 16, 2025 Lamont returned for his third stint with the Pirates, as an advisor on new manager Don Kelly's staff, where Lamont will also serve as the team's bench coach. Lamont had coached Kelly while the latter played for the Detroit Tigers.

== Personal life ==
Lamont is married to Melody. They have two children, Melissa and Wade.

== Managerial record ==
As of September 18, 2015

Team	Year	Regular season					Postseason			
Team	Year	Games	Won	Lost	Win %	Finish	Won	Lost	Win %	Result
CWS	1992	162	86	76	.531	3rd in AL West	–	–	–	–
CWS	1993	162	94	68	.580	1st in AL West	2	4	.333	Lost ALCS (TOR)
CWS	1994	113	67	46	.593	1st in AL Central	–	–	–	–
CWS	1995	31	11	20	.355	fired	–	–	–	–
CWS total		468	258	210	.551		2	4	.333	
PIT	1997	162	79	83	.488	2nd in NL Central	–	–	–	–
PIT	1998	162	69	93	.426	6th in NL Central	–	–	–	–
PIT	1999	161	78	83	.484	3rd in NL Central	–	–	–	–
PIT	2000	162	69	93	.426	5th in NL Central	–	–	–	–
PIT total		647	295	352	.456		0	0	–	
Total		1115	553	562	.496		2	4	.333	

Sporting positions
Preceded by first manager	Fort Myers Royals Manager; 1978–1979	Succeeded by Brian Murphy
Preceded by Joe Jones	Jacksonville Suns Manager; 1980–1983	Succeeded by Rick Renick
Preceded by Joe Sparks	Omaha Royals Manager; 1984–1985	Succeeded by John Boles Jr.
Preceded by	Pittsburgh Pirates Third Base Coach; 1986–1991	Succeeded by Rich Donnelly
Preceded by Rich Donnelly	Pittsburgh Pirates Third Base Coach; 1996	Succeeded by Jack Lind
Preceded by Wendell Kim	Boston Red Sox Third Base Coach; 2001	Succeeded by Mike Cubbage
Preceded by Matt Galante	Houston Astros Third Base Coach; 2002–2004	Succeeded by Doug Mansolino
Preceded by Marc Bombard	Scranton/Wilkes-Barre Red Barons Manager; 2005	Succeeded by John Russell
