= Rich Dubee =

American baseball coach (born 1957)

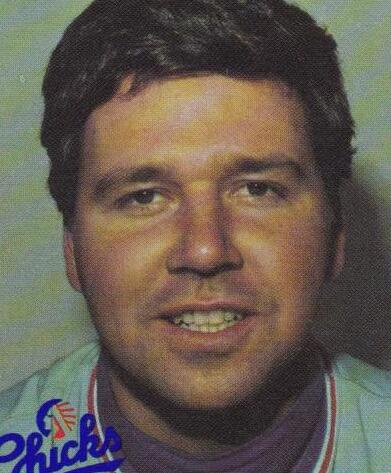
- Dubee as a coach with the Memphis Chicks c. 1987
- Coach
- Born: October 19, 1957 (age 68); Brockton, Massachusetts, U.S.
- Bats: Switch Throws: Right
- Stats at Baseball Reference

Teams
- Florida Marlins (1998–2001); Philadelphia Phillies (2005–2013); Detroit Tigers (2016–2017)

Career highlights and awards
- World Series champion (2008)

Richard Peter Dubee, Jr. (born October 19, 1957) is an American former Major League Baseball (MLB) coach. He has previously coached at the Major League level for the Florida Marlins (now Miami Marlins), Philadelphia Phillies, and Detroit Tigers.

== Playing career ==
Dubee was drafted in the third round of the 1976 MLB draft by the Kansas City Royals. He pitched six years in the Royals system and finished his career 45–49 with a 4.07 earned run average and twenty-six complete games.

== Coaching career ==
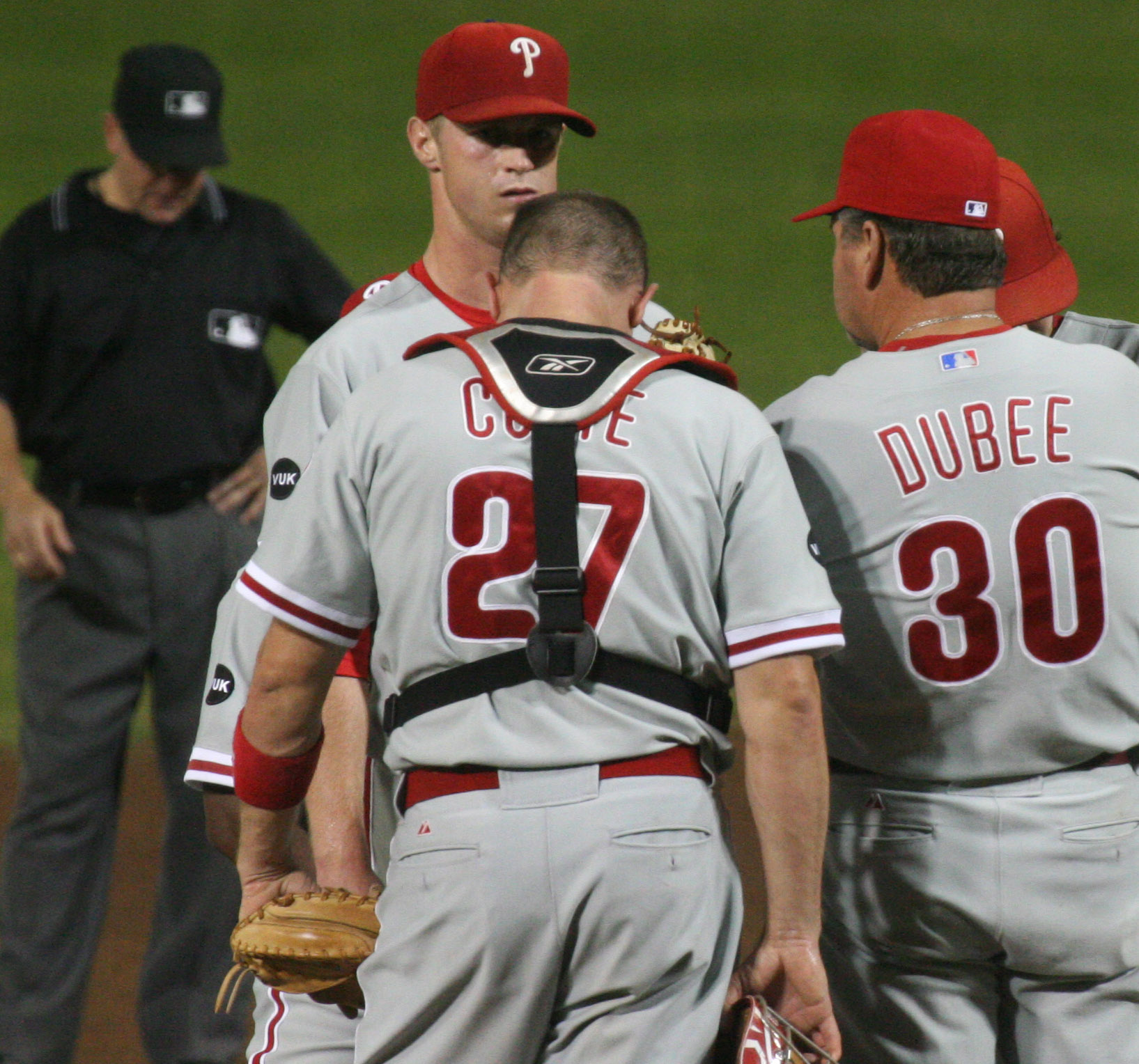
Dubee confers with Kyle Kendrick on the mound.

Dubee began his coaching career with the Kansas City Royals in 1982. He was the Florida Marlins pitching coach from 1998 to 2001. He then served as the pitching coach for the Philadelphia Phillies from 2005 to 2013. The 2013 season was Dubee's thirteenth and final season in the Phillies organization, and ninth as pitching coach.

He was hired as the Atlanta Braves Minor League pitching coordinator in November 2013, replacing Dave Wallace.

On October 29, 2015 Dubee was named the new pitching coach for the Detroit Tigers, replacing retiring Jeff Jones.

In 2021, Dubee was named Coach of the Year in the Perfect Game Collegiate Baseball League, after leading the Saugerties Stallions to the championship.

Sporting positions
Preceded by Larry Rothschild	Florida Marlins pitching coach 1998–2001	Succeeded by Brad Arnsberg
Preceded by Joe Kerrigan	Philadelphia Phillies pitching coach 2005–2013	Succeeded by Bob McClure
Preceded by Jeff Jones	Detroit Tigers pitching coach 2016–2017	Succeeded by Chris Bosio
