= Mick Billmeyer =

American baseball coach

Michael Frederick Billmeyer (born April 24, 1964) is a former baseball player who most recently served as the bullpen coach for the Detroit Tigers during the 2017 season. Mick is now retired in Maryland.

== Career ==
=== Playing career ===
Billmeyer was drafted by the Baltimore Orioles in the second round of the 1985 Major League Baseball draft. As a catcher, he played in the Orioles, Texas Rangers, and California Angels organizations. Billmeyer played nine seasons in the minor leagues, mostly at the Single-A level, and advanced as far as Triple-A. He did not play in the Major Leagues. Early in his playing career, Billmeyer went by "Mickey", a shorthand form of his given name of Michael. Later in his playing career, "Mickey" was shortened further to "Mick".

=== Coaching career ===
Billmeyer began a career in coaching after his playing career came to an end. From 1994 to 1999 he was the bullpen/workout coordinator for the Angels. He joined the Phillies organization in 2000, working as a catching coordinator for the organization through the 2003 season. From 2004 to 2008 he served as the Phillies Major League catching coach, and then served as the bullpen coach from 2009 to 2012. For the 2013 season, Billmeyer returned to the role of major league catching coach. During his time with the Phillies, Billmeyer served under managers Larry Bowa, Gary Varsho, Charlie Manuel, and Ryne Sandberg. As the catching coach, he was a member of the 2008 World Series Championship team.

Following the 2013 season, the Phillies announced they would not be renewing Billmeyer's contract.

On November 18, 2013, the Tigers announced the hiring of Billmeyer as their bullpen coach.

Preceded by Mike Rojas	Detroit Tigers bullpen coach 2014–2017	Succeeded by Rick Anderson
