= Mike Bertotti =

American baseball player (born 1970)

- Pitcher
- Born: January 18, 1970 (age 55); Jersey City, New Jersey, U.S.
- Batted: Left Threw: Left

MLB debut
- July 29, 1995, for the Chicago White Sox

Last MLB appearance
- May 10, 1997, for the Chicago White Sox

MLB statistics
- Win–loss record: 3–1
- Earned run average: 7.63
- Strikeouts: 38
- Stats at Baseball Reference

Teams
- Chicago White Sox (1995–1997)

Michael David Bertotti (born January 18, 1970) is an American former Major League Baseball pitcher. He played during three seasons at the major league level for the Chicago White Sox. He was signed by the White Sox in the 31st round of the 1991 amateur draft. He was given a $1,000 signing bonus upon his request. Bertotti played his first professional season with their Class-A (Short Season) Utica Blue Sox in 1991, and his last with the New York Yankees' Triple-A Columbus Clippers in 2001.

Bertotti played college baseball for Iona College.
