= Chris Tremie =

American baseball player and manager (born 1969)

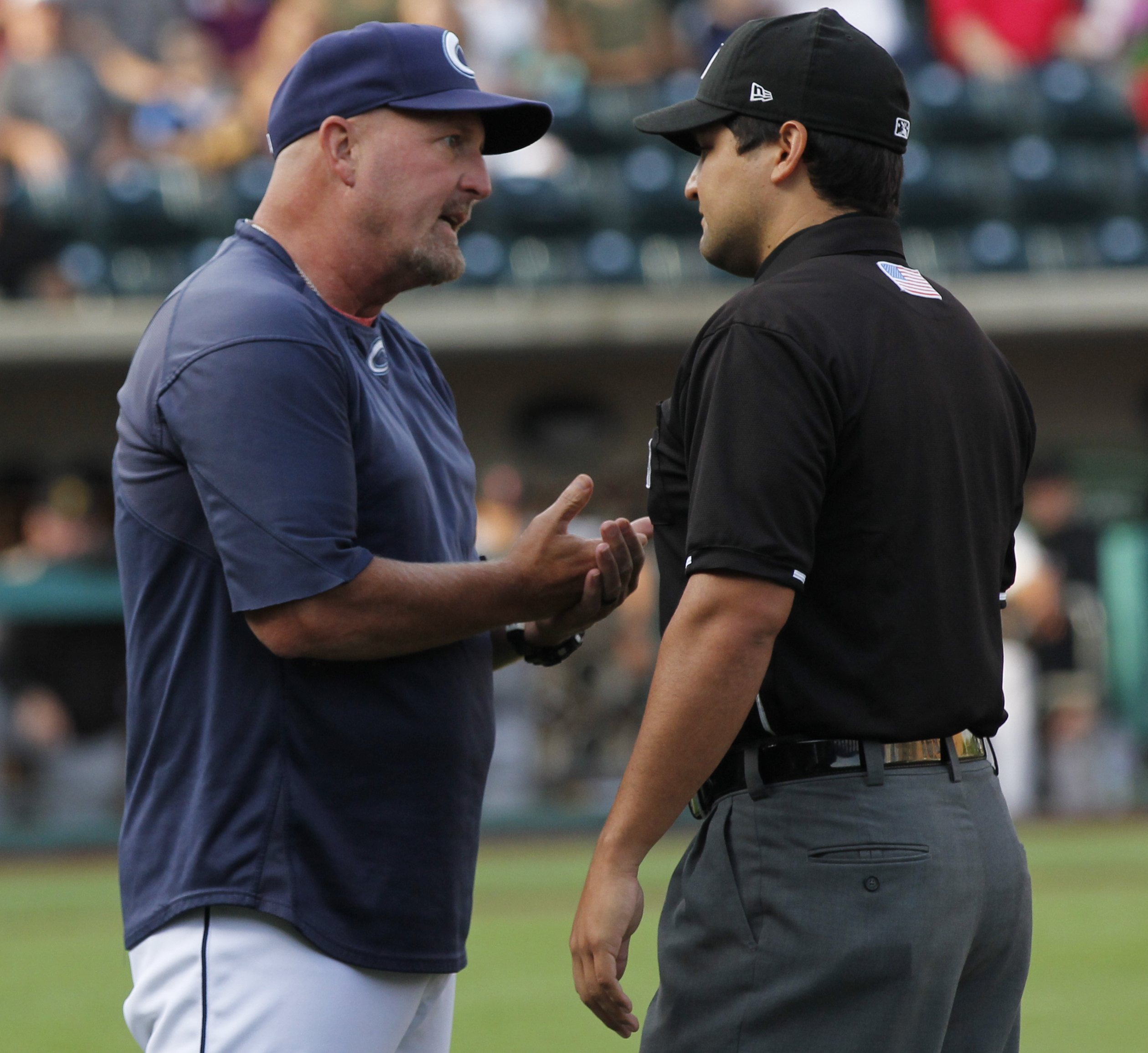
- Tremie (left) with the Columbus Clippers in 2018
- Catcher
- Born: October 17, 1969 (age 56); Houston, Texas, U.S.
- Batted: Right Threw: Right

MLB debut
- July 1, 1995, for the Chicago White Sox

Last MLB appearance
- September 21, 2004, for the Houston Astros

MLB statistics
- Batting average: .146
- Home runs: 0
- Runs batted in: 1
- Stats at Baseball Reference

Teams
- Chicago White Sox (1995); Texas Rangers (1998); Pittsburgh Pirates (1999); Houston Astros (2004)

Christopher James Tremie (born October 17, 1969) is an American former professional baseball catcher. He began his Major League Baseball (MLB) career in 1995 with the Chicago White Sox. After his MLB debut, Tremie had stints with eight minor league teams (Nashville, Reading, Oklahoma, Atlantic City, Newark, Calgary, Round Rock, and New Orleans) and three MLB teams (Texas Rangers, Pittsburgh Pirates, and Houston Astros). Tremie retired in 2005 as a member of the Astros' Triple-A affiliate Round Rock Express. Tremie played NCAA baseball with the University of Houston Cougars.

Tremie managed the Gulf Coast Indians (rookie-level affiliate of the Cleveland Indians) to a 21–29 record in 2006. He served as the manager of the Single-A Kinston Indians in 2009, of the Arizona League Indians in 2010, and of the Akron Aeros in 2011. He was the manager of the Columbus Clippers (2013–2018). He compiled a 852–809 record as a minor league manager in the Cleveland Indians organization before being hired by the Cincinnati Reds as a minor league field coordinator.

In 2026, he was named as the manager for the San Antonio Missions the Double-A affiliate of the San Diego Padres.

== See also ==
- List of University of Houston people
