= Rick Knapp =

American baseball player and coach (born 1961)

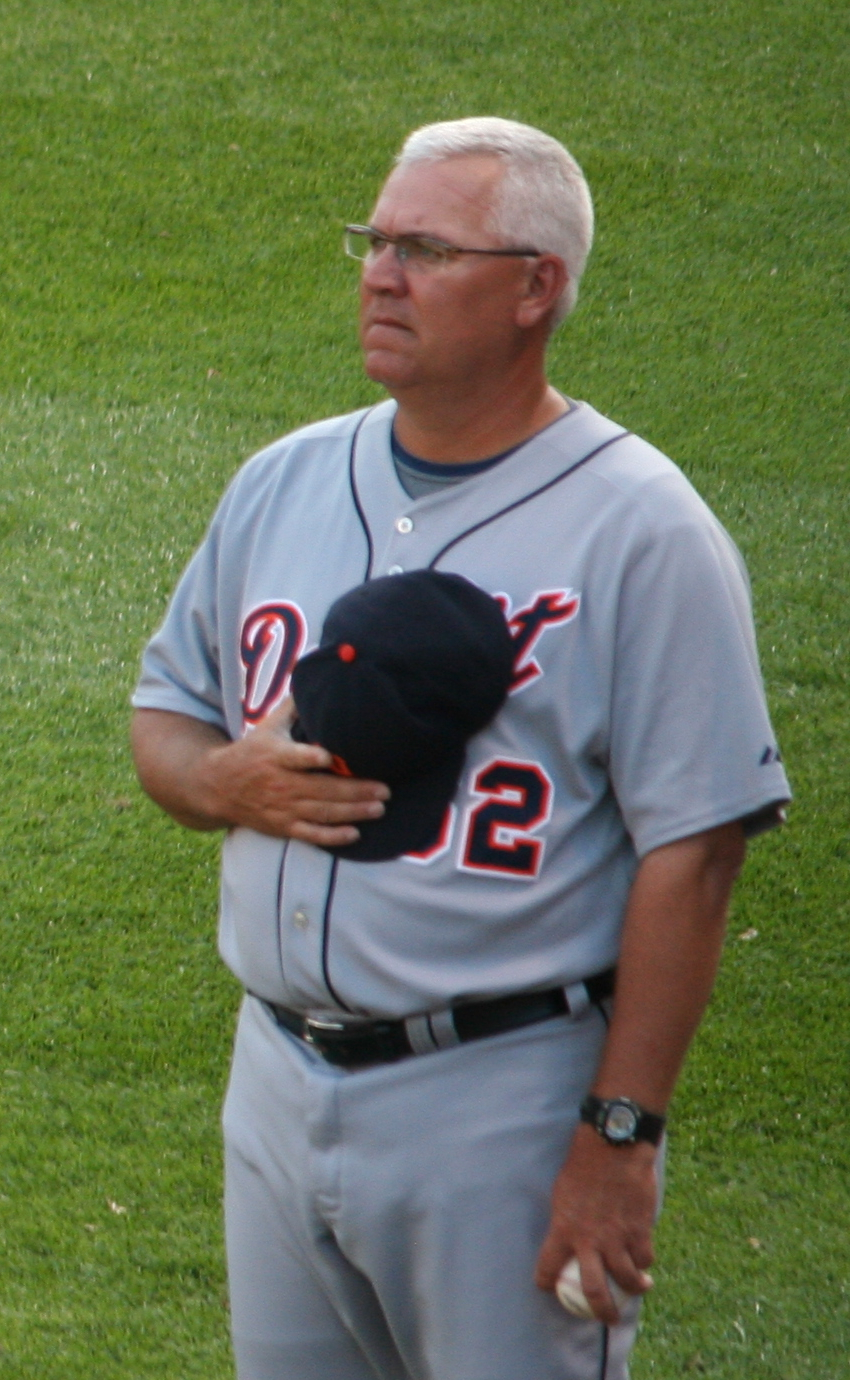
- Knapp as pitching coach for the Detroit Tigers in 2009

Tampa Bay Rays – No. 52
- Coach
- Born: December 11, 1961 (age 64); Baltimore, Maryland, U.S.
- Bats: Right Throws: Right

Teams
- Detroit Tigers (2009–2011); Tampa Bay Rays (2023–present)

Richard A. Knapp (born December 11, 1961) is an American professional baseball pitching coach for the Tampa Bay Rays of Major League Baseball (MLB). He was previously a pitching coach for the Detroit Tigers. Knapp served as the Tigers pitching coach from 2008 until midway through the 2011 season.

== Career ==
Knapp previously served as the minor league pitching coordinator for the Minnesota Twins. Knapp pitched five seasons in the Minor Leagues for the Texas Rangers organization. Knapp attended Virginia Tech and was selected in the 41st round of the 1983 Major League Baseball draft.

Knapp was hired by the Tigers in 2008 to replace Chuck Hernandez. He was relieved of his duties with the Detroit Tigers on July 3, 2011.

Knapp was named minor league pitching coordinator by the Kansas City Royals on September 28, 2011.

He joined the Los Angeles Dodgers organization for the 2013 season as their assistant minor league pitching coordinator. He was promoted to full minor league pitching coordinator in 2015. At the conclusion of the 2016 season he left the Dodgers to assume a new post as an international pitching coordinator for Major League Baseball.

In 2018, Knapp returned to coaching as the pitching coach for the Durham Bulls, the AAA affiliate of the Tampa Bay Rays. The Rays promoted Knapp to assistant pitching coach on their major league roster for the 2022 season.
