= Mike Rojas =

American baseball player & coach (born 1963)

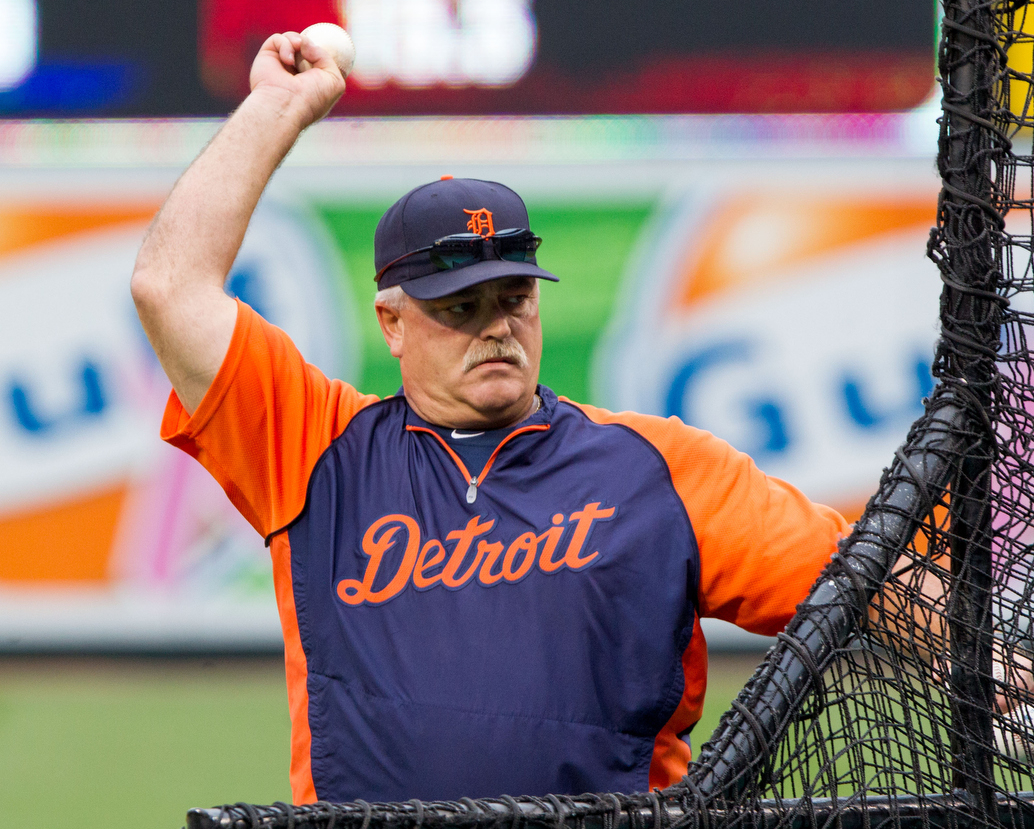
- Rojas pitching batting practice, 2012

Piratas de Campeche
- Catcher / Manager / Coach
- Born: April 17, 1963 (age 63); Miami, Florida, U.S.
- Bats: Right Throws: Right
- Stats at Baseball Reference

Teams
- As coach: Detroit Tigers (2011–2013); Seattle Mariners (2014–2015)

Miguel Angel Rojas (born April 17, 1963) is an American former professional baseball player, coach, and manager who currently serves as the associate manager for the Piratas de Campeche of the Mexican League. He played in minor league baseball as a catcher from 1983 to 1984 for the Oakland Athletics and Toronto Blue Jays organizations. After his playing career, he continued his involvement in professional baseball as a coach and manager for several organizations.

== Baseball career ==
Rojas was born in Miami, Florida. He is a former catcher who played in the Oakland Athletics and Toronto Blue Jays farm systems during the 1980s. His Baseball-Reference page lists him as playing only in 1983–1984, but his mlb.com biography credits him with four years of minor league service, through 1986. He threw and batted right-handed, stood 6 feet 2 inches (1.88 m) tall and weighed 185 pounds (84 kg) as an active player from 1987 to 1991, he coached in the college ranks as an assistant with St. Thomas University.

After managing in the farm systems of the Cincinnati Reds, Houston Astros and Chicago White Sox, Rojas joined the Detroit Tigers' organization in 2004. He piloted teams at the Low-A, Single-A and Triple-A levels. He skippered the Triple-A Toledo Mud Hens in 2007, the first of his two, one-year stints in that job, and led the club to an 82–61 win–loss record and a playoff berth. However, Toledo was eliminated in the first round by the Durham Bulls. Rojas then became field coordinator for the Detroit farm system in 2008 and, later, director of player development.

He was named Detroit's MLB bullpen coach on July 3, 2011, when his predecessor, Jeff Jones, was promoted to Detroit's pitching coach position. Working under manager Jim Leyland, he served in that post until the end of the 2013 season.

When Leyland retired, Rojas followed coaching colleague Lloyd McClendon to the Seattle Mariners, serving as the Mariners' bullpen coach in 2014 and 2015.

On November 3, 2016, Rojas was named the manager of the Toledo Mud Hens for the second time. In 2017, a decade after his original Toledo assignment, he managed the Hens to a 70–71 record and a third place finish in the International League's West Division.

On March 7, 2017, Rojas was named the manager of the Leones del Caracas, for the 2017–2018 season.

In 2018, Rojas will spend his first season as a member of the Kansas City Royals' organization as their Double-A manager; his father, Cookie, appeared in 880 games for the Royals between 1970 and 1977, and made four American League All-Star teams as a second baseman.

On January 9, 2026, Rojas was hired to serve as the associate manager for the Piratas de Campeche of the Mexican League.

== Personal life ==
Rojas is the son of former MLB second baseman, coach, manager and scout Octavio "Cookie" Rojas, still in baseball as a television analyst on the Miami Marlins' Spanish network. His brother Victor is the TV play-by-play announcer for the Los Angeles Angels.

Sporting positions
Preceded by Jeff Jones	Detroit Tigers bullpen coach 2011–2013	Succeeded by Mick Billmeyer
Preceded by Jaime Navarro	Seattle Mariners bullpen coach 2014–2015	Succeeded by Mike Hampton
