= Joe Vavra =

American baseball coach

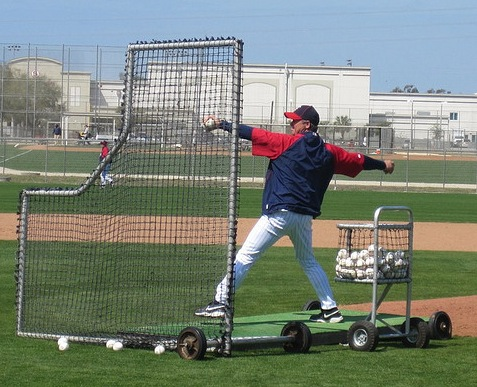
- Vavra with the Minnesota Twins
- Coach
- Born: November 16, 1959 (age 66); Chippewa Falls, Wisconsin, U.S.
- Bats: Left Throws: Right
- Stats at Baseball Reference

Teams
- Los Angeles Dodgers (2000); Minnesota Twins (2006–2017); Detroit Tigers (2018–2020)

Joseph Alan Vavra (born November 16, 1959) is an American professional baseball coach. Vavra previously served as a coach for the Minnesota Twins from 2006 to 2017, and as the Detroit Tigers quality control coach in 2018 and 2019, and hitting coach in 2020.

== Playing career ==
Vavra graduated in 1978 from Chippewa Falls High School, where he was a captain and MVP baseball player his senior season. He played collegiate baseball for the University of Wisconsin–Stout from 1978 to 1982. He graduated with a degree in industrial technology.

Vavra was selected by the Los Angeles Dodgers in the eighth round (203rd overall) of the 1982 Major League Baseball draft. He played five years in the Dodgers farm system, making it to the AAA level in 1986. He never played in the major leagues due to two injuries. The first happened in his final Triple-A game when a runner's cleat shattered his thumb when Vavra attempted to tag the runner. The second setback was when Vavra fell ill with desert fever (Coccidioidomycosis), a disease that eats at the lungs. Vavra finished the year and had to stop playing.

== Coaching career ==
Beginning in 1987, Vavra coached in the Dodgers' minor league system. While at Yakima, Washington in Class A, he was named Manager of the Year for 1994 and 1996 for the Northwest League after winning the division title in 1994 and the League championship in 1996. Vavra coached for ten years in the minors before moving to the Dodgers' major league staff. He served in special assignments and as a roving coach before becoming the permanent bunting and baserunning coach in 2000.

After a brief stint as the head coach of UW–Stout baseball, Vavra joined the Twins' staff in 2002. On October 27, 2005, Vavra was named the Twins' hitting coach.

Vavra attended the 2008 MLB Home Run Derby at Yankee Stadium to pitch for Justin Morneau. Morneau beat Josh Hamilton to win the Home Run Derby.

During Vavra's tenure in Minnesota, the Twins consistently ranked among the best in the league for both individual and team hitting stats.

In 2012, it was announced that Vavra would be reassigned from the Twins hitting coach to the Twins third base coach and infield instruction coach in 2013. He was the Twins bench coach from 2015 through 2017.

On November 2, 2017, Vavra was named the quality control coach for the Detroit Tigers for the 2018 season. Vavra was promoted to hitting coach prior to the 2020 season.

== Personal life ==
Vavra and his wife Lesa have three sons: Tanner, Treysen and Terrin. His son Tanner has played at Valparaiso University and Treysen plays for the Eastern Illinois University baseball team. Tanner was drafted in the 30th round (890th overall) of the 2013 Major League Baseball draft by the Twins. In 2016, Tanner was an infielder for the independent minor-league St. Paul Saints. Terrin was an All-American with the Minnesota Golden Gophers before getting drafted in the third round of the 2018 Major League Baseball draft by the Colorado Rockies, who traded him to the Baltimore Orioles in August 2020.
