= Doug Mansolino =

American baseball coach (born 1956)

- Coach
- Born: September 20, 1956 (age 69); Plainfield, New Jersey, U.S.
- Bats: Right Throws: Right

Teams
- Chicago White Sox (1992–1996); Milwaukee Brewers (1998–1999); Detroit Tigers (2000–2001); Houston Astros (2005–2007)

Doug Mansolino (born September 20, 1956) is an American former coach in Major League Baseball (MLB). He recently served as a field coordinator in the Atlanta Braves organization.

== Career ==
Mansolino served as a coach with the Chicago White Sox (1992–1996), Milwaukee Brewers (1998–1999), Detroit Tigers (2000–2001), and Houston Astros (2005–2007). On September 30, 2007, it was announced that he would not return as third base coach for the Astros.

Mansolino was a manager in Minor League Baseball twice; in 1991 with the Triple-A Vancouver Canadiens, and for part of the 1997 season with the Class A Capital City Bombers.

== Personal life ==
Mansolino attended Huntington Beach High School, then played college baseball for Golden West College and later the Oral Roberts Golden Eagles. He is an avid collector of antique baseball gloves. During the 2006 season, when the Astros were playing a series in Milwaukee, he found a catcher's mitt from 1903. A son, Tony, is the 2026 bench coach of the Atlanta Braves; Tony also was a minor league infielder and manager, and the interim skipper of the 2025 Baltimore Orioles.
