= My My My =

My My My or variations may refer to:

- "My My My" (Armand Van Helden song), 2004
- "My, My, My" (Johnny Gill song), 1990
- "My My My!" (Troye Sivan song), 2018

== See also ==
- My (disambiguation)
- My My (disambiguation)
- Me Me Me (disambiguation)
- My Oh My (disambiguation)
