= Seattle Mariners =

Major League Baseball franchise in Seattle, Washington

- 2026 Seattle Mariners season

Logo	Cap insignia
- Established in 1977

Major league affiliations
- American League (1977–present); West Division (1977–present)

Current uniform
- Retired numbers: 11; 24; 51; 51; 42

Colors
- Navy Blue, Metallic Silver, Northwest Green, Mariners Yellow, Cream

Name
- Seattle Mariners (1977–present)

Nicknames
- The M's

Ballpark
- T-Mobile Park (1999–present); Kingdome (1977–1999)

Major league titles
- World Series titles (0): None
- AL pennants (0): None
- West division titles (4): 1995; 1997; 2001; 2025
- Wild card berths (2): 2000; 2022

Front office
- Principal owner: John Stanton
- President: Kevin Martinez (President of Business Operations)
- President of baseball operations: Jerry Dipoto
- General manager: Justin Hollander
- Manager: Jason Kanzler
- Website: mlb.com/mariners

The Seattle Mariners are an American professional baseball team based in Seattle. The Mariners compete in Major League Baseball (MLB) as a member club of the American League (AL) West Division. The team joined the American League as an expansion team in 1977, originally playing their home games in the Kingdome. Since July 1999, the Mariners' home ballpark has been T-Mobile Park, located in the SoDo neighborhood of Seattle.

The "Mariners" name originates from the prominence of marine culture in the city of Seattle. They are nicknamed the M's, a title featured in their primary logo from 1987 to 1992. They adopted their current team colors – navy blue, northwest green (teal), and silver – before the 1993 season, after having been royal blue and gold since the team's inception; the original colors continue to be used in alternate uniforms. Their mascot is the Mariner Moose.

The Mariners first fielded a winning team in 1991, and reached the playoffs in 1995, 1997, 2000, and 2001; the most successful period in franchise history. Led by Hall of Fame players Edgar Martínez, Ken Griffey Jr., and Randy Johnson, the Mariners clinched their first playoff berth in 1995 when they won their first division championship and defeated the New York Yankees in the ALDS. Martínez's walk-off double in Game 5 drove Griffey in from first base to win the game in the 11th inning, clinched a series win for the Mariners, served as a powerful impetus to preserve baseball in Seattle, and has become an iconic moment in team history. They would win their second division title in 1997.

After Griffey, Johnson, and Alex Rodriguez left the team, the Mariners, bolstered by the signing of Ichiro Suzuki, won 116 games in 2001, which set the American League record for most wins in a single season and tied the 1906 Chicago Cubs for the Major League record for most wins in a single season. Following the 2001 season, the franchise entered a long period of mediocrity and would not make the postseason again until 2022. They won their fourth AL West division title in 2025, their first title since 2001.

The franchise has finished with a losing record in 30 of 49 seasons, as of 2025. The Mariners are the only active MLB franchise to never appear in the World Series, holding the sport's longest active World Series appearance drought.

As of the end of the 2026 season, the Mariners' all-time win–loss record is 3,765–4,108–2 (.478).

== History ==
The Mariners were created as a result of a lawsuit. In 1970, after Bud Selig bought the Seattle Pilots and moved them to Milwaukee to become the Milwaukee Brewers, the city of Seattle, King County, and the state of Washington (represented by then-state Attorney General and future U.S. Senator Slade Gorton) sued the American League for breach of contract. Confident that Major League Baseball would return to Seattle within a few years, King County built the multi-purpose Kingdome, which would become home to the National Football League's expansion Seattle Seahawks in 1976. The name "Mariners" was chosen by club officials in August 1976 from more than 600 names submitted by 15,000 entrants in a "name the team" contest. The name was submitted by Roger Szmodis of suburban Bellevue; when the Mariners attempted to reach Szmodis about the prize he had won, they were unsuccessful—initially and ultimately.

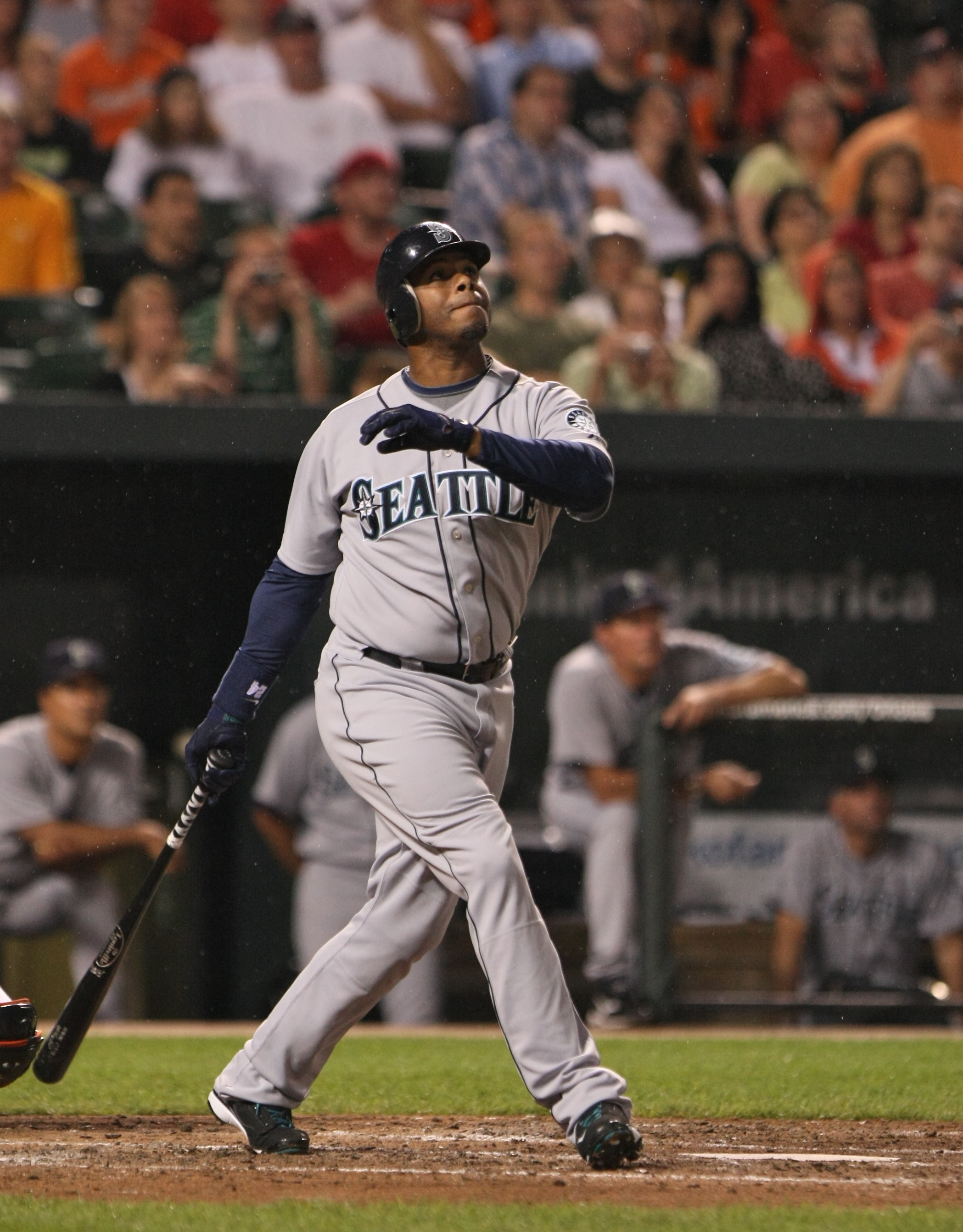
Ken Griffey Jr. holds six single-season batting records and an individual career record for the Mariners franchise.

The first home run in team history was hit in their fifth game on April 10, 1977, by designated hitter Juan Bernhardt. That year, pitcher Diego Seguí, in his last major league season, became the only player to play for both the Pilots and the Mariners. The Mariners finished at 64–98 (.395), matching the 1969 Pilots' record. The team avoided finishing in last place in the AL West by half a game. The Mariners did not post a winning record or finish above fourth place during their first fourteen seasons. In 1979, Seattle hosted the 50th MLB All-Star Game at the Kingdome.

The Mariners were sold to California businessman George Argyros in 1981, who in turn sold the team in 1989 to a group led by Indianapolis-based Jeff Smulyan, who owned radio and television stations, for $76 million. Smulyan proposed moving the team to Tampa, Florida or another market in 1992 before he put the team up for sale. Nintendo of America bought the team after the dismal 1992 season; Nintendo CEO Hiroshi Yamauchi, who held a 49 percent share of the franchise, had never been to a baseball game but sought to thank the city for its role in the company's success.

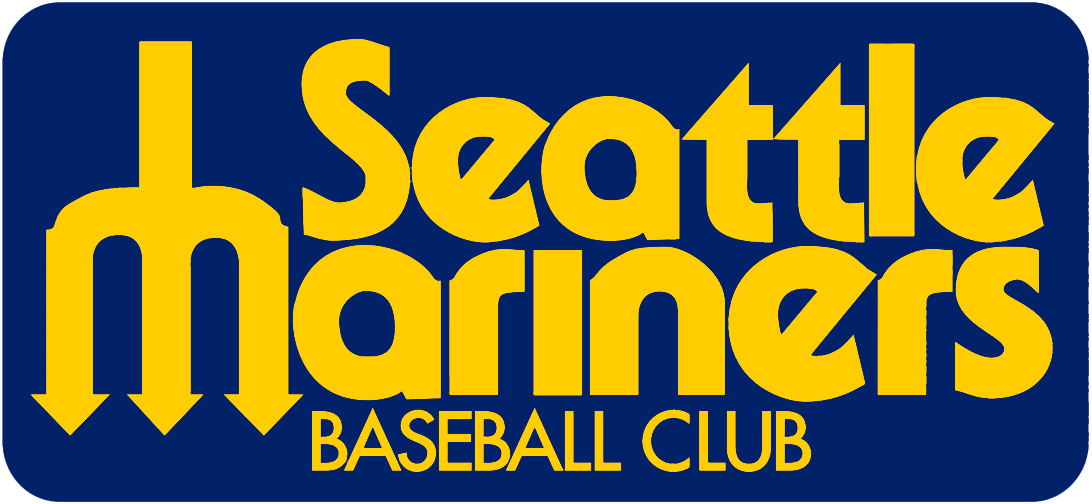
Mariners logo, 1977–1979

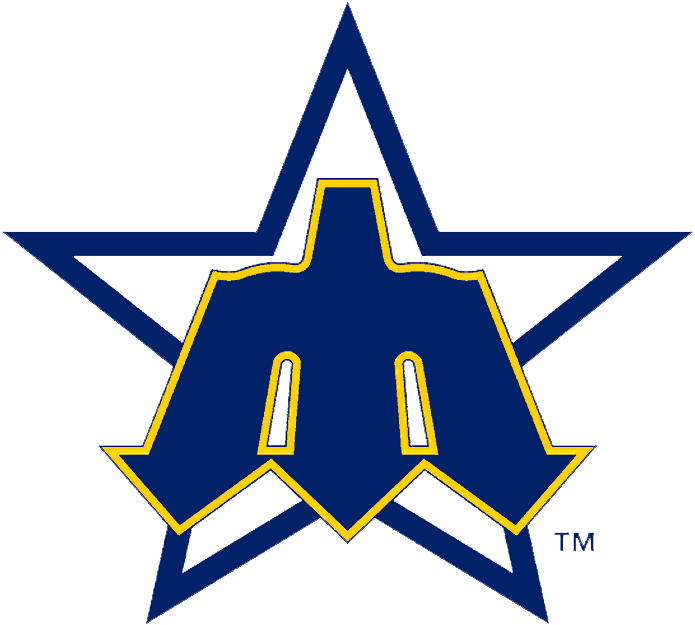
Mariners logo, 1980–1986. Created for the 1979 MLB All-Star Game; was featured on the team's batting helmets for the first time that year.

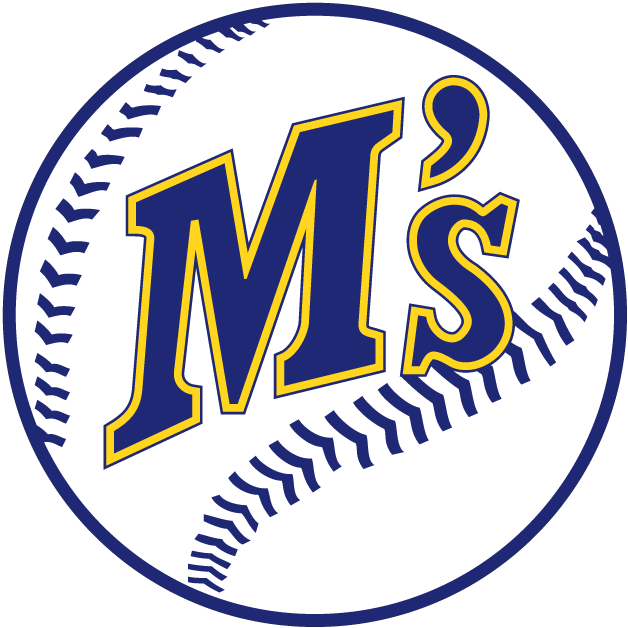
Mariners logo, 1987–1992

Before the 1993 season, the Mariners hired manager Lou Piniella, who had led the Cincinnati Reds to victory in the 1990 World Series. Mariners fans embraced Piniella, and he would helm the team for a decade, from 1993 through 2002, winning two American League Manager of the Year Awards during his tenure. (Piniella was selected by the Pilots in the 1968 expansion draft but did not play for Seattle, being traded in April 1969 to the Kansas City Royals, where he earned AL Rookie of the Year honors that year.)

The Mariners first won the AL West and made the playoffs in 1995, despite star outfielder Ken Griffey Jr. missing much of the season after breaking his wrist crashing into the center field wall in May. The team defeated the California Angels in a one-game playoff to win the division. The Mariners returned to the playoffs in 1997 and 2000.

The 2001 Mariners finished with a record of 116–46 (.716), leading all of Major League Baseball in winning percentage for the duration of the season and easily winning the American League West division title. In doing so, the team broke the 1998 New York Yankees' American League single-season record of 114 wins and matched the all-time MLB single-season record for wins set by the 1906 Chicago Cubs. At the end of the season, Ichiro Suzuki won the AL MVP, AL Rookie of the Year, and one of three outfield Gold Glove Awards, becoming the first player since the Fred Lynn in 1975 to win all three in the same season. The Mariners advanced through the postseason but lost to the Yankees in the ALCS; it was Seattle's last playoff appearance for 21 years.

The Mariners had a 93-win season in 2002 but failed to make the postseason. Manager Lou Piniella was traded to the Tampa Bay Devil Rays during the offseason. The team repeated with 93 wins in 2003 and also did not qualify for the playoffs. On October 22, 2008 the Mariners announced the hiring of Jack Zduriencik, formerly scouting director of the Milwaukee Brewers, as their general manager. Weeks later, on November 18, the team named Oakland Athletics bench coach Don Wakamatsu as its new manager. The off-season also saw a litany of roster moves, headlined by a 12-player, 3-team trade that sent All-Star closer J. J. Putz to the New York Mets and brought five players, including prospect Mike Carp and outfielder Endy Chávez from New York and outfielder Franklin Gutiérrez from the Cleveland Indians, to Seattle. Many of the moves, like the free-agent signing of Mike Sweeney, were made in part with the hope of squelching the clubhouse infighting that plagued the Mariners in 2008. It also saw the return of Seattle favorite Ken Griffey Jr. The 2009–10 offseason was highlighted by the trade for 2008 AL Cy Young Award winner Cliff Lee from the Philadelphia Phillies, the signing of third baseman Chone Figgins, and the contract extension of star pitcher Félix Hernández.

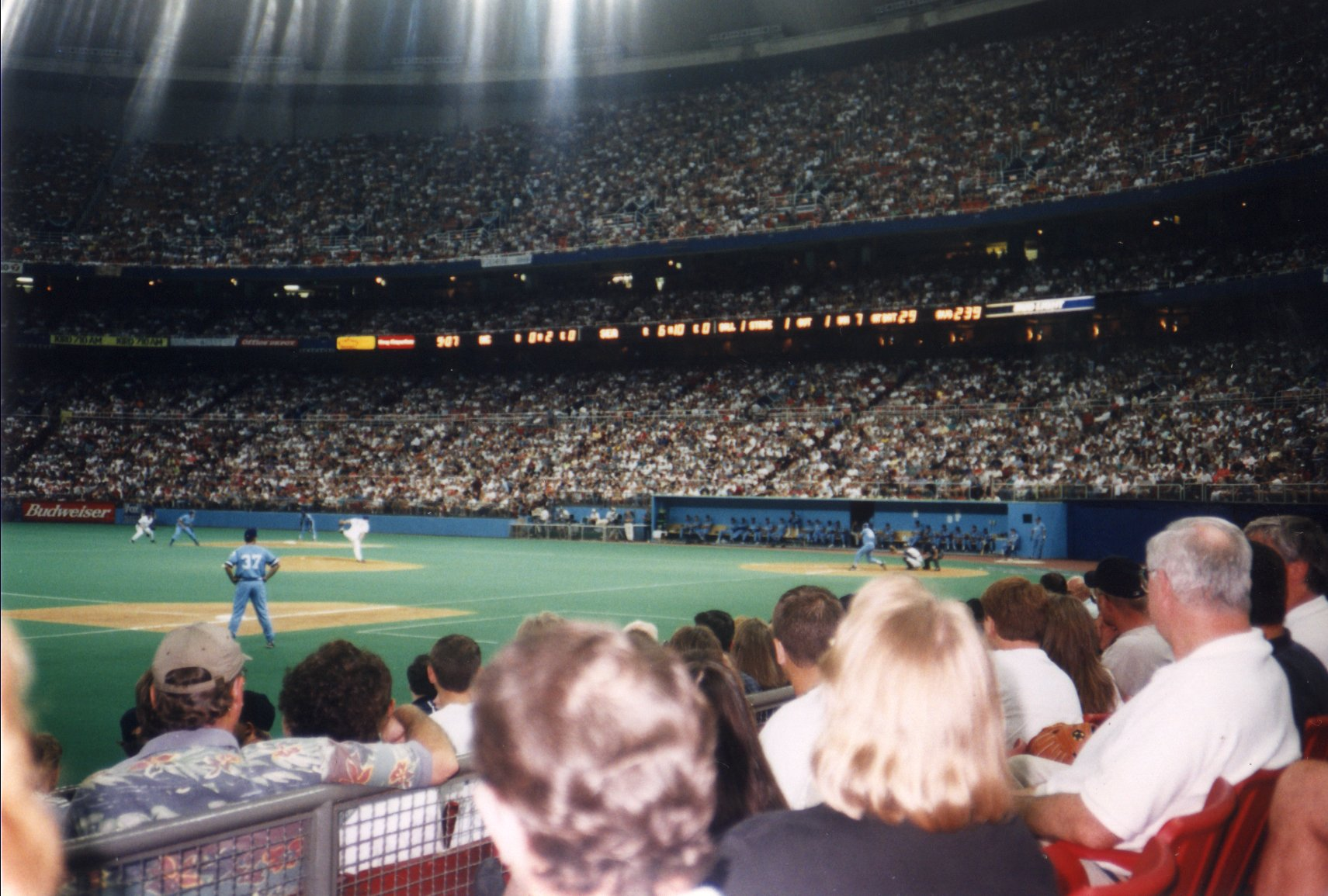
Inside the Kingdome (1977–June 1999)

Griffey announced his retirement on June 2, 2010, after 22 MLB seasons. After its busy offseason and high expectations, the team flopped in 2010 and finishing at 61–101 (.377), the worst record in the American League. The Mariners fired Wakamatsu along with several coaches on August 9 and Daren Brown, the manager of the Triple-A affiliate Tacoma Rainiers, took over as interim manager. Dave Niehaus, the Mariners' play-by-play announcer since the team's inception, died of a heart attack on November 10, 2010, at the age of 75. In memory of Niehaus, Seattle rapper Macklemore wrote a tribute song called "My Oh My" in December 2010. He performed the song at the Mariners' Opening Day game on April 8, 2011. The Mariners hired former Cleveland manager Eric Wedge as their new manager on October 19, 2010.

On April 21, 2012, Philip Humber of the Chicago White Sox threw the third perfect game in White Sox history against the Mariners in Seattle. It was the 21st perfect game in MLB history. Mariners starter Kevin Millwood and five relievers combined to throw the tenth combined no-hitter in MLB history, the first in Mariners history, on June 8. The six pitchers used in a no-hitter tied a major league record, first set by the Houston Astros in 2003. Félix Hernández pitched the first perfect game in team history, shutting down the Tampa Bay Rays 1–0 at Safeco Field on August 15, the 23rd perfect game in MLB history. The Mariners became the first major league first team to be involved in two perfect games in one season.

Zduriencik was fired on August 28, 2015. Jerry Dipoto, a former general manager of the Los Angeles Angels of Anaheim, was hired as the Mariners' new general manager one month later. On October 9, manager Lloyd McClendon was fired after two seasons, succeeded by Scott Servais on October 23. On April 27, 2016, Nintendo announced that it was selling its controlling stake in the Mariners to First Avenue Entertainment limited partnership, led by John W. Stanton. Nintendo retained a ten percent ownership share of the team after the sale was completed in August 2016. The franchise was valued at $1.4 billion at the time and included Root Sports Northwest, the team's regional television network.

The Stanton/Dipoto/Servais era was characterized by two competitive phases. In the first phase, the organization tried to contend for a championship with the existing core of Robinson Cano, Félix Hernández, Nelson Cruz, and Kyle Seager. The team came close but ultimately missed the playoffs. Following the 2018 season, the organization pivoted to a rebuild, trading several players for prospects. Following a fallow period of 2019–20, the team returned to contention in 2021, winning 90 games but falling short of the playoffs. In 2022, with a new core including Julio Rodríguez, J. P. Crawford, Cal Raleigh, Luis Castillo, George Kirby, and Logan Gilbert, the team reached the postseason for the first time since 2001. This broke what was at the time the longest playoff drought of any team in the "Big Four" North American sports. Rodríguez also won the American League Rookie of the Year Award.

In 2023, the M's won 88 games but finished one game out of a playoff spot. In August 2024, Servais was fired after losing a ten-game lead in the AL West over the Houston Astros and having the team fall back to .500. He was succeeded by former Mariners catcher Dan Wilson, but the team again missed the playoffs by one game. In 2025, the Mariners won their first AL West title in 24 years. In the playoffs, they defeated the Tigers in the ALDS in five games and had a 2-0 ALCS lead against the Blue Jays until they ultimately lost a 3-1 lead in Game 7. This was the first time the franchise ever played in a Game 7, also meaning this is the closest they have ever been to a World Series appearance.

== Uniforms ==
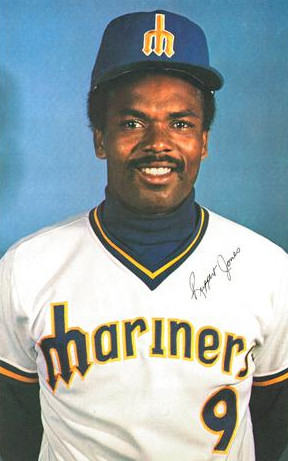
Ruppert Jones in the team's first uniform design

=== 1977–1980 ===
The Mariners' original colors were blue and gold, the color scheme previously used by the Seattle Pilots and its successor Milwaukee Brewers. For the first four seasons, they wore white pullover jerseys at home with the team name in front and numbers on the left chest. The "M" in "Mariners" was shaped to resemble a trident. On the road, they wore baby blue pullover jerseys with the city name in front and numbers on the left chest. The lettering colors were blue with gold trim, though in the 1977 season the trim on the road jersey was white and the "Seattle" wordmark appeared smaller. The trident logo was added to the left sleeve prior to the 1979 season.

The cap was all-blue and featured the gold trident logo with white trim.

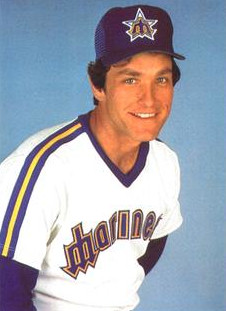
Floyd Bannister in the 1981 Mariners uniform

=== 1981–1986 ===
The Mariners made some subtle changes to the uniform in 1981. The trident logo was replaced by blue and gold racing stripes on the shoulders, and the lettering received an extra blue outline. The number font also changed from rounded to block style. In 1985, the road jersey color was changed to grey.

The cap logo also featured a slight update of the trident logo, changing its color to blue, along with additional outlines and a white star background, a logo first used for the 1979 All-Star Game.

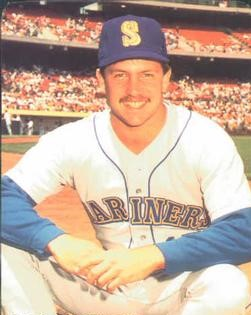
Scott Bankhead in the uniform design from 1987 to 1992

=== 1987–1992 ===
In 1987, the Mariners changed its uniform style to traditional buttoned tops and belted pants. Both uniforms incorporated blue piping and a block "Mariners" wordmark in blue with gold and blue outlines. The numbers remained blue, but eliminated the trim outlines.

The cap logo was changed to a gold "S."

=== 1993–present ===
The Mariners donned their current uniforms in 1993. The white home uniform originally featured "Mariners" in navy with trim in a shade of teal green, exclusively named "Northwest Green" for the team, and featured the "compass rose" logo atop the "M." The grey road uniform originally featured "Seattle" in navy with Northwest Green and white trim; in 2001, the compass rose logo was added in the middle of the "S." In 2015, a silver inline was added to the wordmark of both uniforms, which was also applied to the block letters and numbers. The primary logo is applied to the left sleeve.

From 1997 to 2000, the Mariners also wore sleeveless versions of their primary uniforms, accompanied with a navy undershirt.

The Mariners have also worn Northwest Green alternate uniforms at different points in their history. The original version was unveiled in 1994 and had "Mariners" in silver with navy and white trim. The next season, the white trim was removed to improve visibility. The Mariners did not wear green uniforms from 1997 to 2010, after which it became a regular part of their uniform rotation. Formerly worn on Friday home games, the Northwest Green alternates are currently worn on select Saturday home games and on road games in which the home team wears either navy or black uniforms.

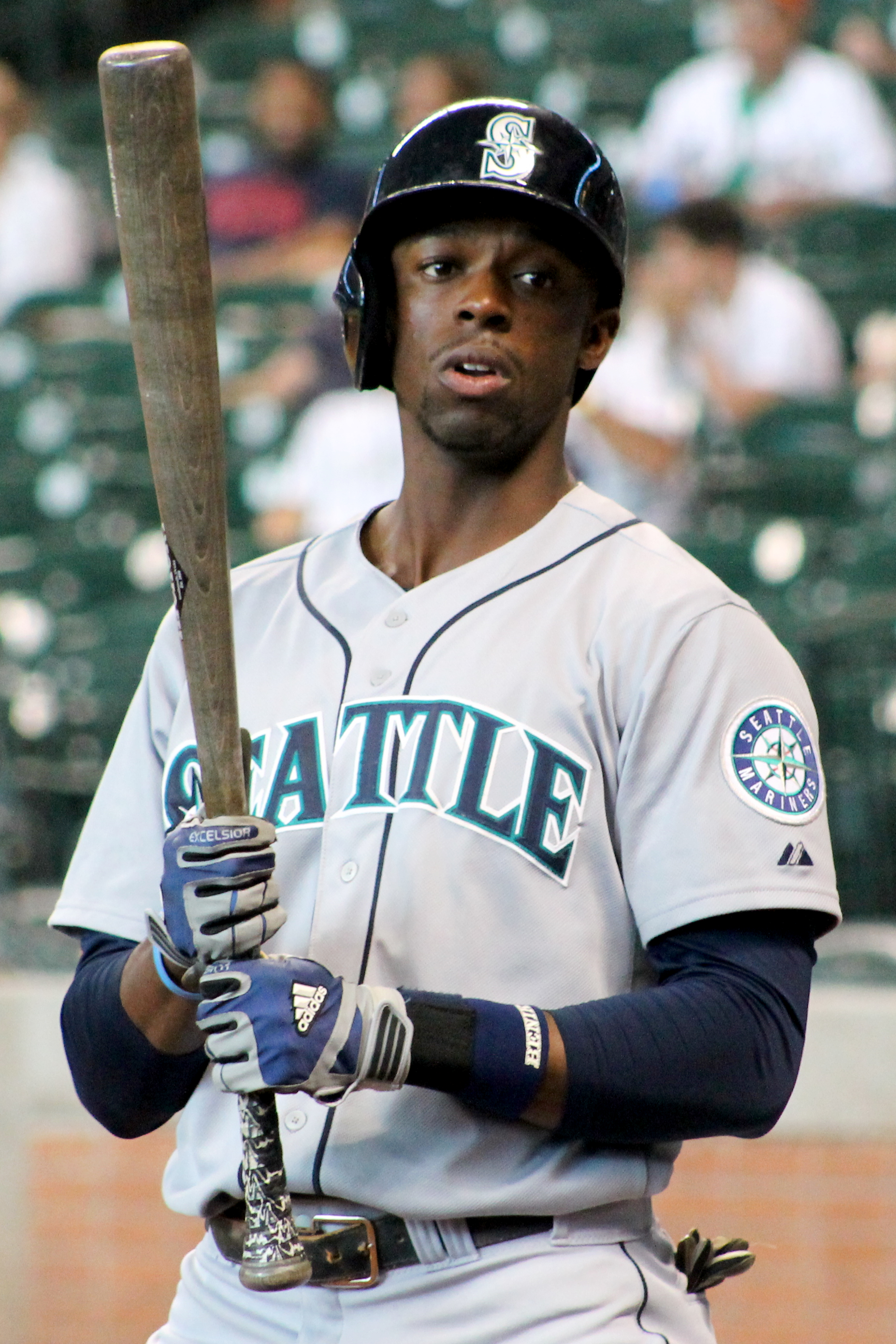
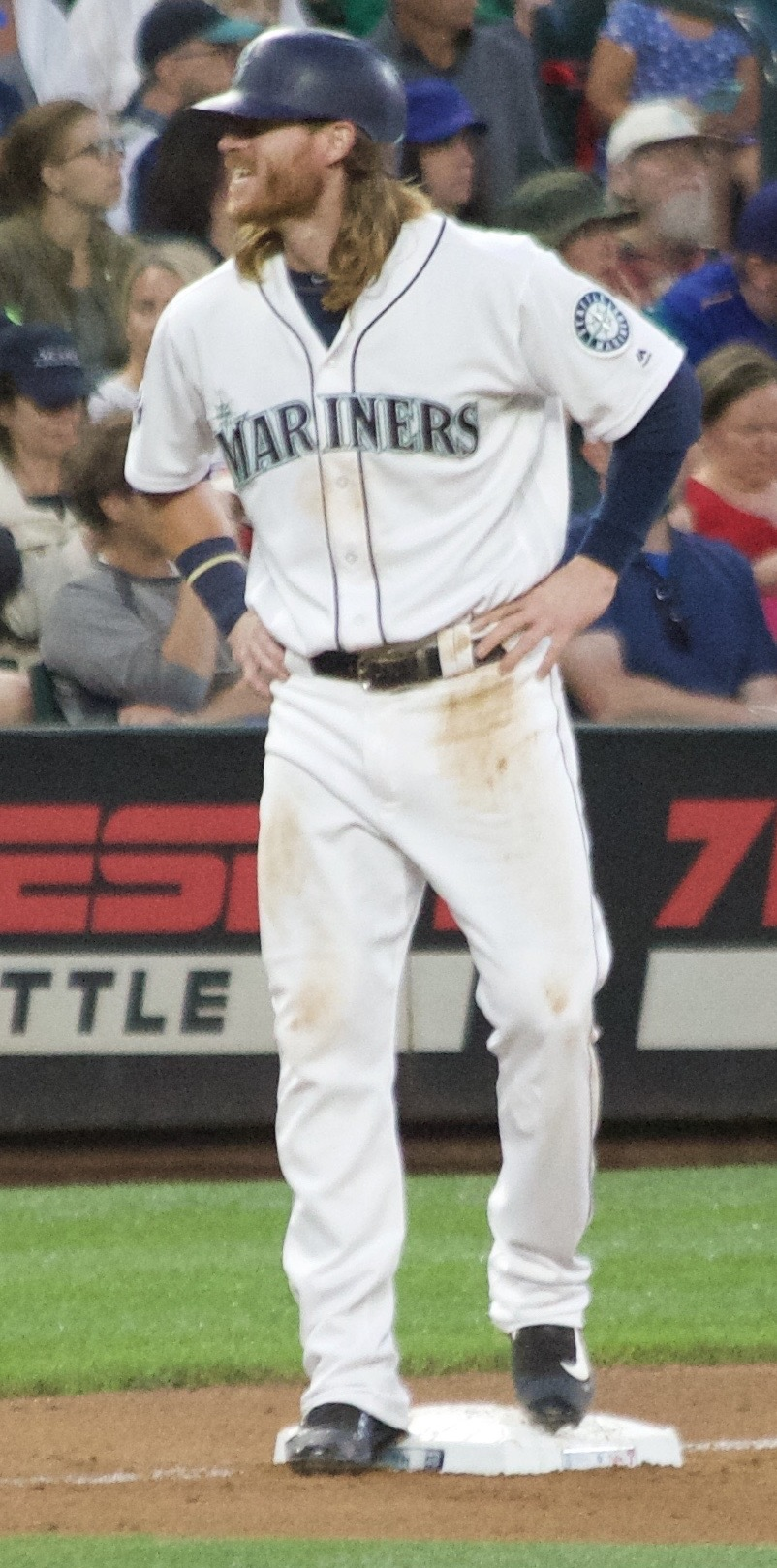
James Jones and Ben Gamel in the Mariners' current uniform design

The navy alternate uniform originally replaced the Northwest Green alternate in 1997 and featured the team name in silver with Northwest Green and navy trim. In 1999, the alternates were updated to feature the city name with the "S" behind the compass rose logo and silver piping; this became their road alternate the following season after a corresponding home navy alternate was introduced. In 2003, the silver piping was removed and the letter and number fonts were changed to match the wordmark. In 2012, after the Northwest Green home alternates were brought back, the navy uniforms were tweaked anew, this time with the city name in front and stylized serifed letters instead of the normal block letters. In 2024, the names were changed to block lettering. It is now worn on most road games, though they have also donned them at home on occasion.

A navy blue cap that features a ball and compass rose "S" logo is paired with the home white, road gray, and navy blue jerseys. A variation of this cap with a Northwest Green brim is worn with the home alternate jersey. In 1994, the Mariners also wore Northwest Green caps with navy brims, and in 1997 the team wore a navy cap with grey brims.

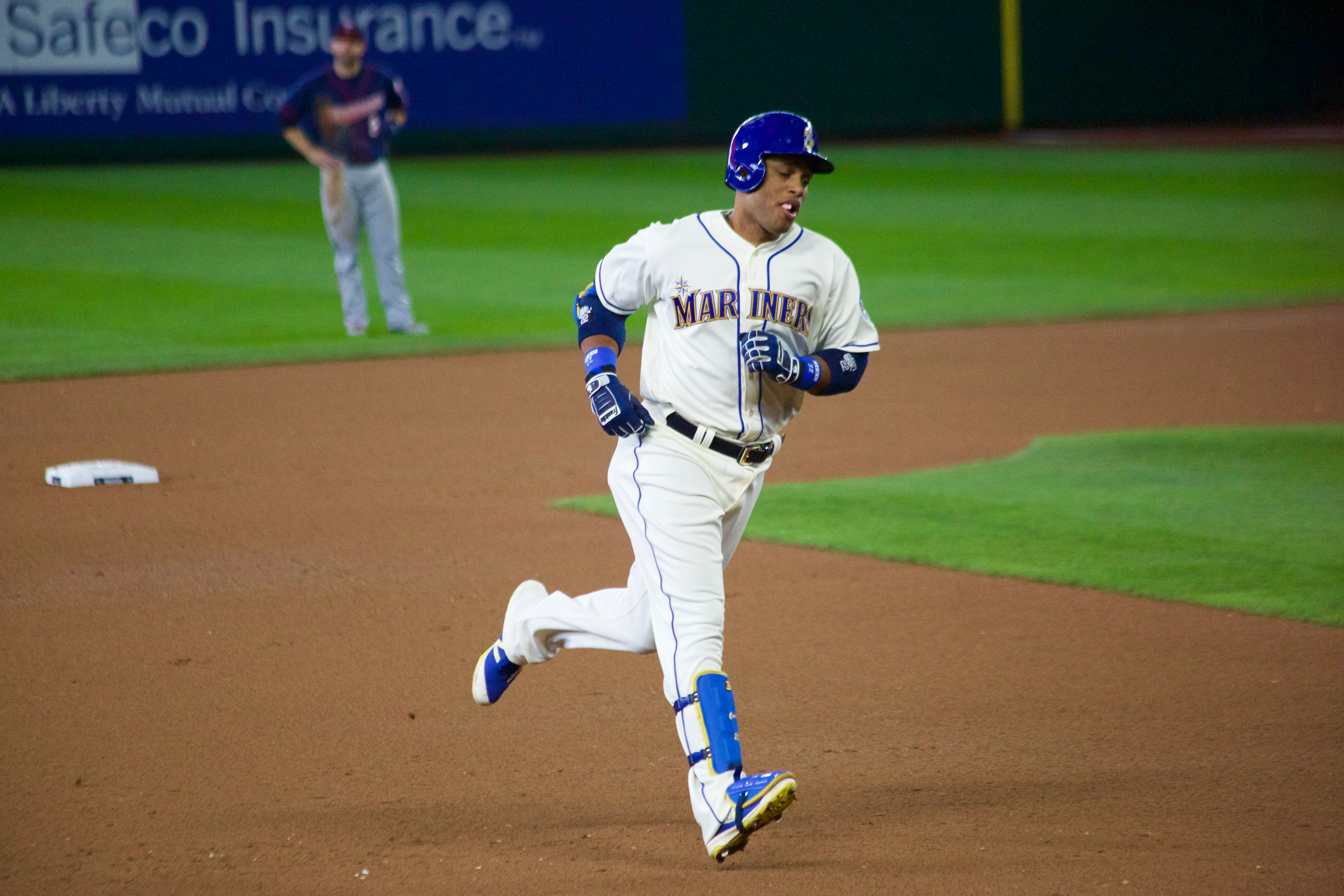
Robinson Canó in the Mariners' cream alternate uniform in 2016

In January 2015, the team announced a new alternate uniform to be worn for Sunday home games. This cream-colored "fauxback" uniform features the current logo and lettering style in a royal blue and gold color scheme, a throwback to the original team colors. Unlike the rest of the uniform set, the back of the jersey does not display the player name. The cap features the current cap logo in the throwback colors.

In January 2019, the Mariners announced a new home and away uniform to be worn during spring training. The jersey has a design similar to their home white jerseys but features a powder blue throwback to the team colors during the 1980s. The cap has the usual navy blue color, but with a logo that features the signature compass rose and with a large M in the center.

For the 2023 season, MLB and Nike have instituted a "four plus one" model for team uniforms, consisting of a home uniform, away uniform, two alternate uniforms, and a City Connect uniform featuring "color schemes and logos that pay homage to a team's city." The Mariners confirmed that they will replace the gray jerseys with the navy blue jerseys as their standard away uniforms for the 2023 season. The team will also stop using the powder blue jerseys during spring training. The choice to remove the gray and powder blue jerseys was based on feedback from players and fans, according to Kevin Martinez, the Mariners senior vice president of marketing and communications.

The Mariners' City Connect uniform is a visual nod to Seattle's baseball history. The jersey includes a sleeve patch featuring Mount Rainier and the letters "PNW," an acronym for Pacific Northwest. The jersey also includes the inaugural colors of the team and the word "Seattle" across the chest lettering reminiscent of the Seattle Pilots. The jersey is paired with a cap that has new design of the trident logo and black pants. This uniform is primarily worn during Friday home games. The team wore the City Connect uniform more frequently in 2024, since they won most of their games in the alternates. In the 2025 season, the Mariners partnered with Nintendo of America to have the company's "racetrack" logo on the sleeve of the home game jersey and the logo of Switch 2 on the sleeve of the away game jersey.

For the 2026 season, the team announced a new black-and-cream alternate uniform modeled on that of the Seattle Steelheads, the city's Negro league team between 1944 and 1946. This uniform replaces the Sunday home uniform introduced in 2015.

== Spring training ==
The Peoria Sports Complex in Peoria, Arizona has been the Mariners' home spring training facility since 1993, although the stadium wasn't completed until the following year. The complex is shared with the San Diego Padres. On March 25, 2013, in a 16–0 victory over the Cincinnati Reds, the Mariners broke the team record for total home runs during a spring training season with 52. Prior to Peoria, the Mariners trained in Tempe at Tempe Diablo Stadium.

== Season records ==
This is a partial list listing the past 24 completed regular seasons. For the full season records, see here.

Year	Record	Win %	Place in AL West	Postseason	Notes
2001	116–46	.716	1st	Won ALDS vs Cleveland Indians, 3–2; Lost ALCS vs New York Yankees, 4–1.	Tied the regular-season record with 116 wins, but went 4–6 in the postseason. Ichiro Suzuki named AL MVP and Rookie of the Year.
2002	93–69	.574	3rd		Celebrated 25th anniversary of the franchise
2003	93–69	.574	2nd		Last season winning over 90 games, having done so in four consecutive seasons.
2004	63–99	.389	4th		Suzuki had 262 hits, which broke George Sisler's 84-year-old hit record. Edgar Martínez retired after his 18th and final season with the Mariners.
2005	69–93	.426	4th		
2006	78–84	.481	4th		
2007	88–74	.543	2nd		The franchise celebrated its 30th anniversary. Suzuki is named All-Star Game MVP.
2008	61–101	.377	4th		First team of 2008 to officially be eliminated from the 2008 postseason. Worst record since 1983, which was the last time they had lost over 100 games in a season. First team in MLB history to lose 100 games with a $100 million payroll. Dave Niehaus won the Ford C. Frick Award, presented by the National Baseball Hall of Fame and Museum.
2009	85–77	.520	3rd		Suzuki set the new MLB record with 9 consecutive seasons with at least 200 hits. They were outscored by 52 runs, the most by any 85+ win team in MLB history, followed by their 2021 and 2018 seasons.
2010	61–101	.377	4th		Félix Hernández won the 2010 AL Cy Young Award. Ichiro Suzuki and Franklin Gutiérrez won the 2010 Gold Glove awards for AL right field and center field, respectively. Former Executive Pat Gillick was elected to the National Baseball Hall of Fame by the Veterans Committee. Ichiro Suzuki had his tenth consecutive season batting over .300 with 200 hits, winning a Gold Glove Award, and appearing in the All-Star Game.
2011	67–95	.414	4th		Pitchers Hernández, Brandon League, and Michael Pineda named all-stars.
2012	75–87	.463	4th		Celebrated 35th Anniversary of the franchise. Featured a combined no-hitter and perfect game by Félix Hernández. Became the first team in MLB history to both win and lose in perfect games in one season. Suzuki was traded to the Yankees on July 23.
2013	71–91	.438	4th		Despite the debuts of top prospects Nick Franklin, Mike Zunino, Brad Miller, Taijuan Walker, and James Paxton, the Mariners once again failed to make the postseason. Although the Mariners took a major step forward in the power department, hitting the second-most home runs in the American League (188 trailing Baltimore's 212), hitting fundamentals, questionable defense, and a shallow pitching rotation and bullpen held the team back. On September 27, manager Eric Wedge announced that he would not return for the 2014 season. He was replaced by Lloyd McClendon.
2014	87–75	.537	3rd		The Mariners made a surprising playoff run in 2014, but in the end, they fell short on the final day of the season. Hernández led the AL with a 2.14 ERA and Robinson Canó had a career year in his first season with Seattle.
2015	76–86	.469	4th		Hisashi Iwakuma threw a no-hitter against the Baltimore Orioles on August 12. McClendon was fired after the season ended. On October 23, Scott Servais was hired as the team's new manager.
2016	86–76	.531	2nd		The Mariners made another surprising run for the postseason, but they ultimately fell short of the playoffs by one game. The trio of Canó, Nelson Cruz, and Kyle Seager all had stellar seasons themselves.
2017	78–84	.481	tied-3rd		Celebrated 40th anniversary of the franchise. Canó named All-Star Game MVP.
2018	89–73	.549	3rd		Paxton, a Canadian, threw a no-hitter in Toronto on May 8.
2019	68–94	.420	5th		Began the season with two wins in the Tokyo Dome, which were the final two games of Suzuki's career. After opening the season with a historic 13–2 record, the team lost 37 of the next 49 games.
2020	27–33	.450	3rd		The Mariners outperformed preseason expectations for the team in the shortened season, a result of the COVID-19 pandemic, but ultimately fell two games short of qualifying for the expanded playoffs. Kyle Lewis named AL Rookie of the Year. J. P. Crawford and Evan White won Gold Glove awards for AL shortstop and first base, respectively, White becoming the first rookie to receive the award at first base.
2021	90–72	.556	2nd		The Mariners remained in playoff contention until the final day of the season but were eliminated with wins by both the New York Yankees and the Boston Red Sox and a loss to the Los Angeles Angels. They were outscored by 51 runs, the most of any 90+ win team in MLB history, following the 1984 Mets at 24 runs.
2022	90–72	.556	2nd	Won ALWC vs Toronto Blue Jays, 2–0; Lost ALDS vs Houston Astros, 3–0.	The team made the playoffs for the first time since 2001, ending the longest active postseason drought in Major League Baseball at the time. Julio Rodríguez was named the AL Rookie of the Year.
2023	88–74	.543	3rd		The franchise hosted the All-Star Game. The team threw a club-record 18 shutouts and came within one game of making the playoffs.
2024	85–77	.525	2nd		The team held a 10-game lead in the AL West with a record of 44–31 over the Houston Astros who were able to take back the lead coming off the All-Star Break and win the division by 3.5 games.
2025	90–72	.556	1st	Won ALDS vs Detroit Tigers, 3–2 Lost ALCS vs Toronto Blue Jays 4–3	The team won the AL West for the first time since 2001, clinching it on a 9–2 win against the Colorado Rockies on September 24, 2025. The Mariners would go on to beat the Detroit Tigers in the 2025 ALDS 3–2. Cal Raleigh became the first catcher to hit 60 home runs in a season.
2026	76–86	.469	3rd		The Mariners had a 47–44 record on July 6, but went 29–42 the rest of the way, missing the playoffs by five games. Randy Arozarena was the lone Mariners representative in the All-Star Game.

== T-Mobile Park ==
T-Mobile Park (known as Safeco Field from 1999 to 2018) has been home to the Seattle Mariners since the first game vs. the San Diego Padres on July 15, 1999. There were 44,607 people in attendance that night.

=== Seattle Mariners Hall of Fame ===
Mariners then-chairman and CEO John Ellis announced on June 14, 1997, the creation of a Mariners Hall of Fame. The Mariners operate the hall of fame, which honors players, staff, and other individuals that greatly contributed to the history and success of the Mariners franchise. It is located at the Baseball Museum of the Pacific Northwest in T-Mobile Park. The most recent Mariners Hall of Fame member, Félix Hernández, was inducted August 12, 2023.

Key
Year	Year inducted
**Bold**	Member of the Baseball Hall of Fame
†	Member of the Baseball Hall of Fame as a Mariner
**Bold**	Recipient of the Hall of Fame's Ford C. Frick Award

**Seattle Mariners Hall of Fame**
Inducted	No.	Player	Position	Tenure
1997	21	Alvin Davis	1B	1984–91
2000	—	**Dave Niehaus**	Broadcaster	1977–2010
2004	19	Jay Buhner	RF	1988–2001
2007	11	**Edgar Martínez**^{†}	DH/3B	1987–2004
2007	11	**Edgar Martínez**^{†}	Coach	2015–2018, 2024-Current
2012	6	Dan Wilson	C	1994–2005
2012	6	Dan Wilson	Manager	2024-Current
2012	51	**Randy Johnson**	P	1989–1998
2013	24	**Ken Griffey Jr.**^{†}	CF; DH/OF	1989–1999; 2009–2010
2014	14	Lou Piniella	Manager	1993–2002
2015	50	Jamie Moyer	P	1996–2006
2022	51	**Ichiro Suzuki**^{†}	RF	2001–2012, 2018, 2019
2023	34	Félix Hernández	P	2005–2019

== Retired numbers ==
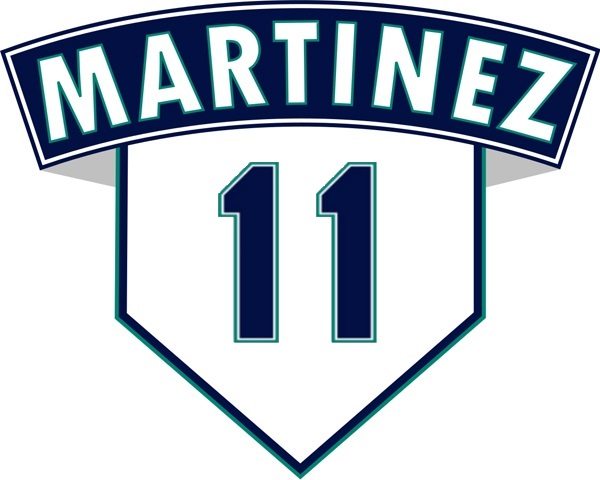
Edgar
Martínez
DH, 3B
Coach
Retired August 12, 2017
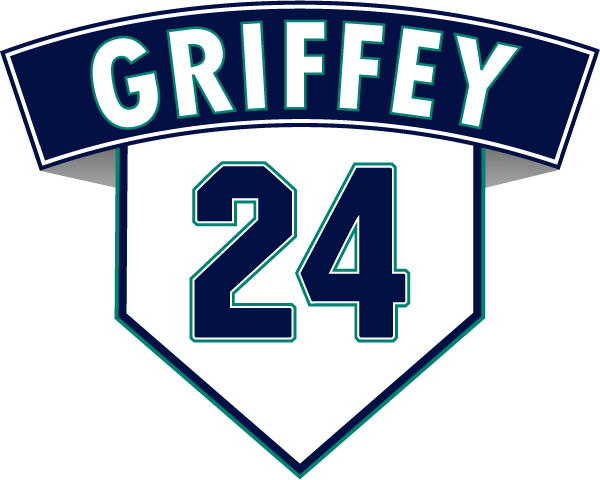
Ken
Griffey Jr.
OF
Retired August 6, 2016
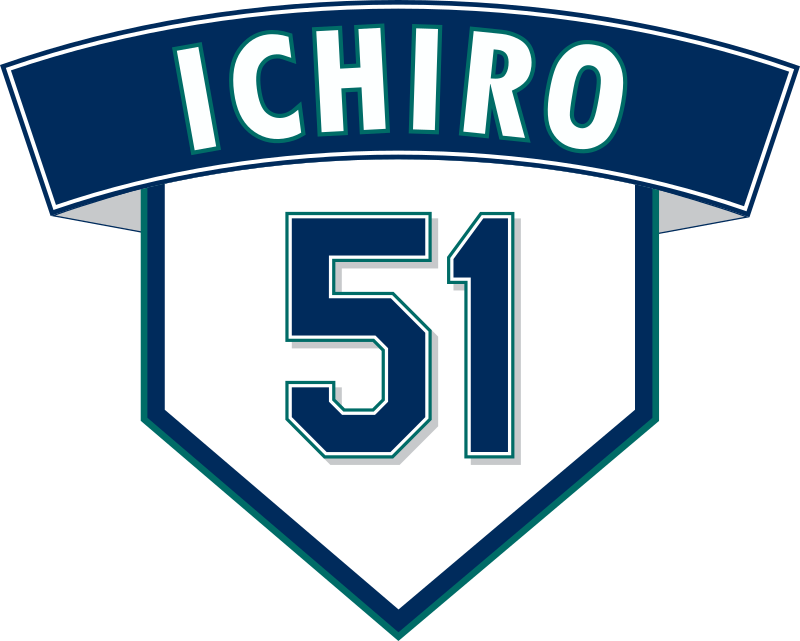
Ichiro
Suzuki
OF
Retired August 9, 2025
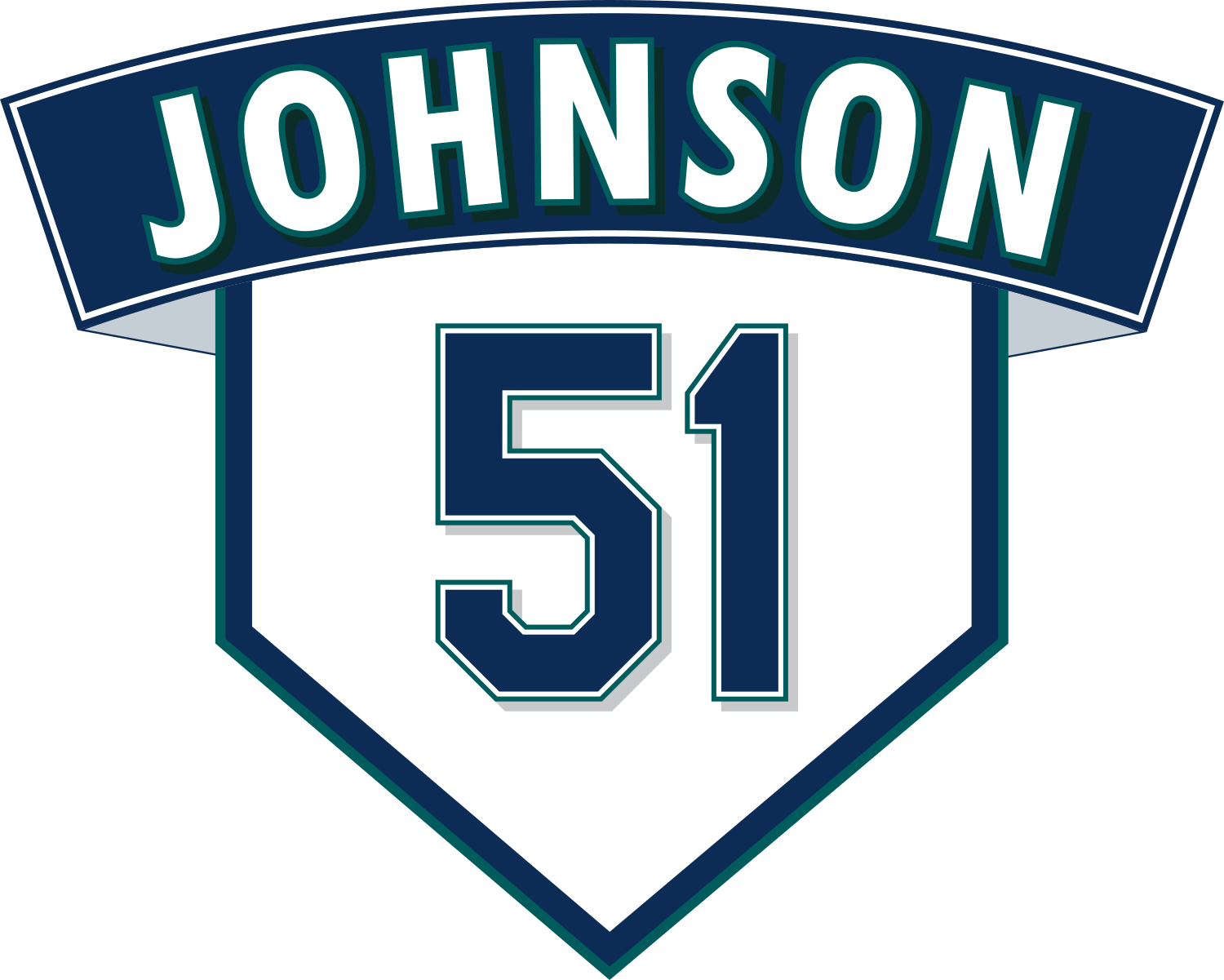
Randy
Johnson
SP
Retired May 2, 2026
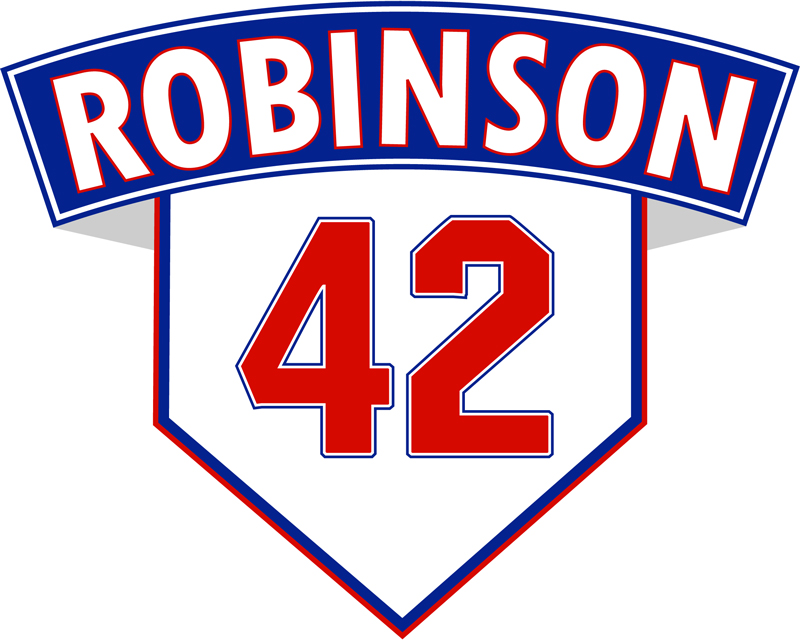
Jackie
Robinson
All MLB
Honored April 15, 1997

The Mariners criteria for retiring a uniform number is more selective than the standards for the Mariners Hall of Fame. To be eligible to have one's number retired, in addition to the criteria outlined for the Mariners' Hall of Fame, the former Mariners should have either:
a) been elected to the National Baseball Hall of Fame and been in a Mariners uniform for at least five years, or
b) come close to such election and have spent substantially his entire career with the Mariners.
Eligibility shall not commence until after the former player has been voted on once for the National Baseball Hall of Fame, which for effectively means six years after retirement.

Ken Griffey Jr.'s No. 24 was retired at the beginning of the 2016 season, with the retirement ceremony taking place on August 6, 2016. Griffey was elected to the Hall of Fame in January of that year.

Edgar Martínez's No. 11 was retired during the 2017 season, with the retirement ceremony taking place on August 12, 2017. Martínez played his entire career with the Mariners and first appeared on the Hall of Fame ballot in 2010. His No. 11 was retired in 2017, predating his 2019 election to the Hall of Fame and seemingly establishing the 58.6% of the vote he received that year as sufficiently "close" to election to satisfy the criteria. The number 11 was not issued to anyone after Martínez's retirement as a player in 2004 until his return to the Mariners as hitting coach in 2015.

Ichiro Suzuki's No. 51 was retired by the Mariners in a pregame ceremony on August 9, 2025, days after his induction into the Hall of Fame. He has continued to wear the number after retiring, including during spring training in 2020 and 2022 as well as when throwing out a ceremonial first pitch in 2022.

Randy Johnson's No. 51 was retired by the Mariners in a pregame ceremony on May 2, 2026. Johnson played 10 seasons with the Mariners, from 1989 until mid-1998, and was elected to the Hall of Fame in 2015. The #51 was withheld until 2001, when it was issued to Ichiro Suzuki upon his request. No other player, besides Suzuki, had worn that number for the Mariners since Johnson.

Jackie Robinson's No. 42 was retired throughout MLB on April 15, 1997, the 50th anniversary of him breaking MLB's racially exclusionist color line.

== Culture ==
=== "Louie Louie" ===
From the 1990 season through the 2021 season, as part of the seventh-inning stretch, after the crowd was led in singing "Take Me Out to the Ball Game" or "God Bless America" the public address system played the Kingsmen's version of "Louie Louie". The song was a regional hit in the Northwest, covered by many local bands for nearly a decade until the Portland-based Kingsmen recorded their version in 1963. In 1985, the song's regional importance was publicized by a campaign to make it the official state song of Washington. The tradition to play the song during the seventh inning stretch began as an attempt for the then new ownership group to put its stamp on the team, and was solidified on June 2, 1990, when the Kingsmen performed the song in the middle of the seventh inning live from atop a dugout. That game, Randy Johnson threw the first no-hitter in Mariners history.

For the 2022 season, the Mariners replaced "Louie Louie" with the Macklemore & Ryan Lewis song "Can't Hold Us". Replacing "Louie Louie" was a source of contention for some fans. The Mariners stopped playing "Can't Hold Us" after Macklemore's comments at a Palestinian benefit concert in September 2024.

'Louie Louie' returned to games in the 2025 season, remixed to a slightly more uptempo beat and interspersed with encouragement to the crowd ("Let's Go Mariners!").

=== Buhner Buzz Cut Night ===
In 1994, the Mariners started a promotion called "Buhner Buzz Cut Night". Inspired by Jay Buhner's shaved head, any fan who was willing to have their head shaved before the game—or was already bald—would receive a free ticket to the game and a T-shirt with a slogan, such as "Bald Is Buhnerful" or "Take Me Out to the Bald Game". Hair 10 inches or longer was collected for charity. The promotion continued until Buhner's retirement in 2001, with a year's hiatus in 2000, and is still remembered by fans today. The club revived the promotion for its 30th anniversary in 2024, with Buhner giving catcher Cal Raleigh a buzz cut.

=== Rally Fries ===
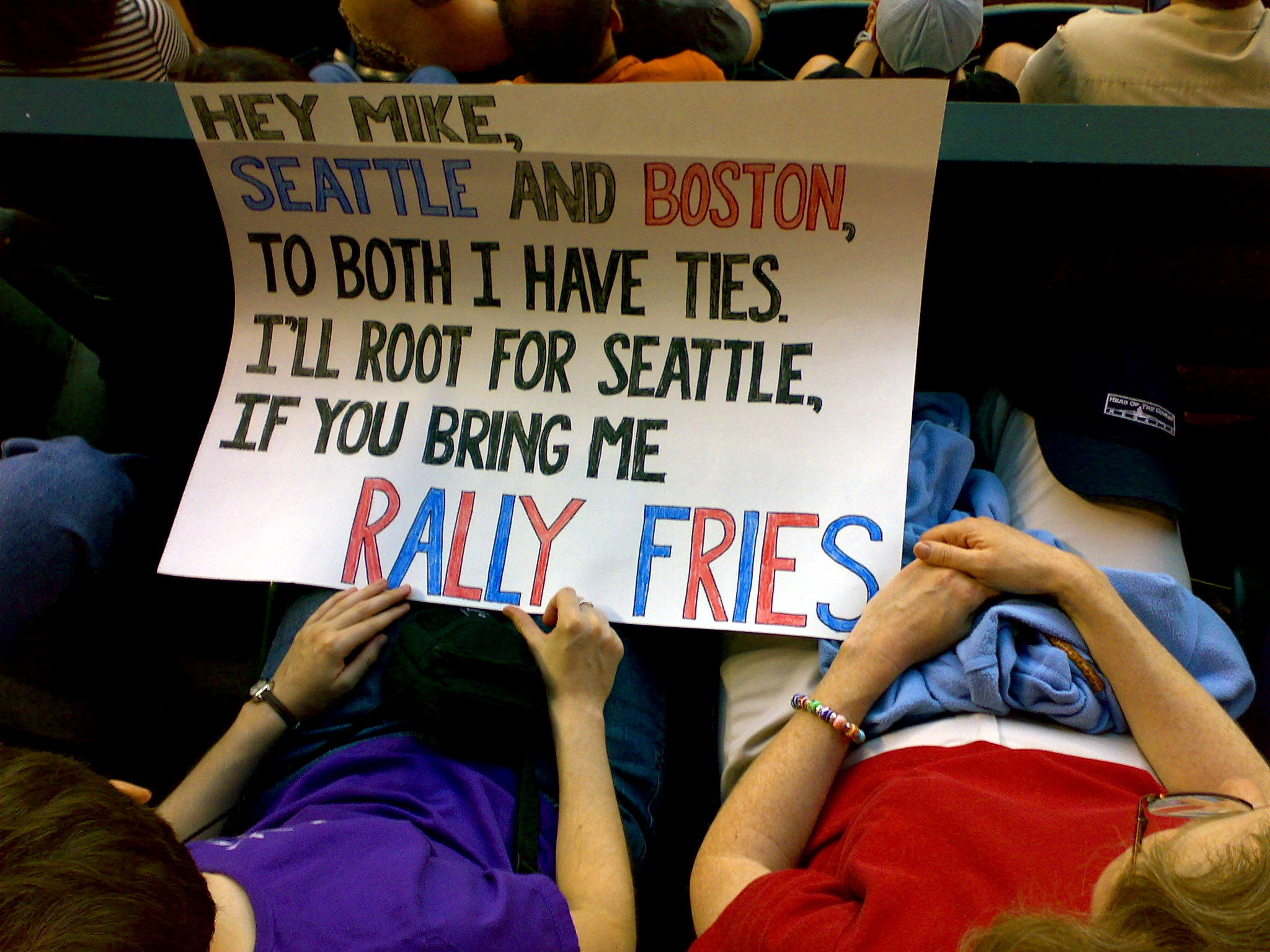
Boston Red Sox fans holding a sign requesting rally fries.

Rally Fries are a baseball tradition started by Mariners broadcaster Mike Blowers in 2007. During a game against the Cincinnati Reds, a fan tried to catch a foul ball along the right-field line but in turn spilled his tray of french fries along the track. While chatting on the air and seeing the mishap, Blowers's partner, Dave Sims, suggested that he should send a new tray of fries to the fan. Blowers agreed, and sent his intern to deliver a plate of fries to the man.

At the Mariners' next game, fans made signs and boards asking Blowers for fries as well. Coincidentally, every time the fries were delivered, the Mariners seem to score or rally from a deficit, and thus the "Rally Fries" were created. This became so popular with the fans that signs were even seen when the Mariners were the visiting team, although on August 1, 2009, Blowers established that he only gives out fries at home games.

Generally, Blowers would select a person or a group of people that appealed to him, whether it was through fans wearing elaborate costumes or waving funny signs and boards. The fries were usually delivered from Ivar's, a Seattle-based seafood restaurant with a location at T-Mobile Park. The amount of fries given out varied with the size of the winning group of fans. The winners were generally selected around the 5th or 6th inning, although potential candidates were shown in almost every inning beforehand.

Sims confirmed in 2012 that the Rally Fries promotion had ended.

=== JROD Squad ===
The JROD Squad honors Mariners center fielder Julio Rodríguez. The location varies, although it is usually in seats in center field. Fans buying tickets to the JROD Squad section (referred to collectively as JROD's Squad) receive a T-shirt showing a replica of a gold chain Rodríguez wears around his neck. Rodríguez often interacts with the JROD Squad, waving to them and throwing them balls at the end of innings.

=== Previous fan sections ===
==== Area 51 ====
When Ichiro Suzuki played right field for the Mariners, seats in right field were often informally called Area 51, a nod to Suzuki's uniform number (51) and the top-secret government site in Nevada of the same name.

==== King's Court ====
As the 2011 season progressed, the Mariners' marketing staff came up with an idea to encourage the growing fanbase of star pitcher "King" Félix Hernández. Every Hernández start at T-Mobile Park was accompanied by the King's Court, a designated cheering section for fans to sing, chant, and cheer while donning yellow T-shirts and "K" cards supplied by the team. It was located in the lower seating area along the third baseline. The team encouraged other activities, such as dressing like Larry Bernandez, Hernández's alter ego from a Mariners TV commercial, and awarding fans wearing costumes with a turkey leg.

The Supreme Court was a special event where the King's Court section was extended to the entirety of T-Mobile Park. The first Supreme Court was Hernández's first home game following his perfect game in 2012. Following opening day 2012, it occurred each year at Hernández's first home game of each season.

The King's Court ended following Hernández's departure from the Mariners at the end of the 2019 season.

==== Maple Grove ====
During the 2017 season, fans created the Maple Grove, a celebration of Canadian pitcher James Paxton and inspired by the King's Court. At home games where Paxton started, a group of fans sat under a Maple Grove banner, typically in the left-field bleachers. A potted maple tree was also present in their section, provided by the Mariners. The Grove dubbed the tree "Stick Rizzs", referencing long-time broadcaster Rick Rizzs.

When Paxton got to two strikes on a batter, the Grove held up "Eh" Cards, a tip of the cap to Paxton's home country of Canada and a nod to the "K" (for strikeout) cards held up in King's Court. Variant cards have also been produced for special occasions, such as when a planned Paxton start turned into a Hernández start (a King's Grove, with "K'eh" cards to cheer for Hernández). Other special cards celebrated Paxton reaching 300 strikeouts, and a tribute to broadcaster Angie Mentink ("A" cards, to show support after she had publicly disclosed her breast cancer diagnosis). An "Eh" card is now part of the Baseball Hall of Fame's collection.

The Maple Grove differed from the King's Court in that it was created and organized by fans, while the Court was promoted by the Mariners' marketing team. When asked, Paxton stated that fans creating the Maple Grove was really special to him and that he never imagined that something of the sort would ever be done for him. The Grove continued until Paxton was traded to the Yankees following the 2018 season.

== Rivalries ==
=== Divisional ===
The Mariners held a longstanding divisional rivalry with the Oakland Athletics as they would often battle for playoff contention or lead of the division through the early 2000s. Following the realignment of the division in 2013, the Mariners have also built a recent rivalry with the Houston Astros as both teams have handily fought for control of the division.

==== Los Angeles Angels ====
The Los Angeles Angels have maintained an off-and-on rivalry with the Mariners as both teams have often fought for control of the division or a playoff berth. Both teams often clashed for playoff positions during the early 2000s as the Mariners boasted a 116 win team in 2001 while the Angels managed to win the World Series in 2002. Despite both teams encountering a decline through the decade, regular matchups often developed into clashes for relevance in the division. Recently, both teams were each trying to end postseason droughts, bolstered by players such as Julio Rodríguez and Ty France for Seattle and Shohei Ohtani and Mike Trout for the Angels The two teams have met 741 times, with the Angels leading the series 400–341. The teams have yet to meet in the postseason. In 2022, tensions were heightened after Angels pitcher Andrew Wantz intentionally hit Mariners batter Jesse Winker with a pitch, leading to a major brawl that resulted in several players receiving suspensions.

==== Houston Astros ====
The Mariners and Houston Astros have fought for control of the division in recent years, since the Mariners started periodically contending for the postseason in 2014. The Astros lead the all-time regular season series 132–97 and have a perfect 3–0 record against Seattle in the postseason.

The 2022 season saw the Mariners return to the playoffs, in a year that included multiple bench-clearing incidents between the Astros and Mariners during the regular season. The Mariners and Astros faced off in the 2022 ALDS, with Houston sweeping the Mariners in 3 games. The third and final game of that series was among the longest in postseason history; its 18 innings matched the longest game in playoff history and its 6 hours, 22 minutes was the third-longest in time.

The rivalry was a brief focus at the end of the 2025 season, after a 3 game sweep of the Astros in Houston by the Mariners in late September. The sweep put the Mariners 3 games up in the division with 6 to play while all but eliminating the Astros from postseason contention. 3 days later, the Mariners won the AL West Division championship for the first time in 24 years.

=== American League ===
==== Toronto Blue Jays ====
Although the Seattle Mariners and Toronto Blue Jays are not a divisional rival, many Blue Jays fans from Western Canada travel to Seattle when the Blue Jays are the visiting team. Seattle is about a three-hour drive from Vancouver. The Seattle Times estimated that Blue Jays fans represented around 70 percent of the crowd in Safeco Field for a June 2017 weekend series. Additionally, both teams joined the league at the same time in the 1977 Major League Baseball expansion. The Mariners broke their playoff drought in Toronto in the 2022 American League Wild Card Series with a dramatic comeback in Game Two, after being down by a deficit of one run to eight, winning by a final score of ten to nine. The two teams faced off again in the post-season in the 2025 American League Championship Series. Seattle took the first two games on the road in Toronto, but ultimately lost the series three games to four, with the Blue Jays winning game seven at home.

=== Interleague ===
==== The Vedder Cup ====
An unusual rivalry exists between the Mariners and the National League's San Diego Padres. The matchup was designated one of the 15 "naturalized rivalries" when interleague play began in 1997, and the teams have played every year since, except 2017.

Little on the surface links the two teams to any actual hostility, as both play in separate leagues and in cities that sit about 1,250 miles apart. Still, they share a spring training facility—the Peoria Sports Complex in Peoria, Arizona—and in many years have competed for draft picks and prospects after failing to make the playoffs. (The Padres did not win a playoff series between 1999 and 2019, while the Mariners did not reach the playoffs from 2002 to 2021.) Far from a bitter rivalry, it is viewed by the teams and most fans as more of a humorous contest.

The rivalry had long been unofficially called the Vedder Cup after Pearl Jam frontman Eddie Vedder, who claims both Seattle and San Diego as hometowns but is a vocal fan of the Chicago Cubs. In 2025, the rivalry was officially recognized as "The Vedder Cup", with the winner of the series being awarded a trophy designed by Vedder. The Mariners won the Vedder Cup in 2025.

== Players ==
=== Roster ===
Seattle Mariners 2027 spring training roster
40-man roster		Non-roster invitees	Coaches / other
**Pitchers**: 13 Kade Anderson; 83 Eduard Bazardo; 47 Matt Brash; 88 Cooper Criswell; 82 Nick Davila; 58 Seranthony Domínguez; 36 Logan Gilbert; 26 Emerson Hancock; 68 George Kirby; -- James McArthur; -- Isaac Mattson; 75 Andrés Muñoz; 49 Robinson Ortiz; 38 Michael Rucker; 55 Gabe Speier; 59 Troy Taylor; 54 Carlos Vargas; 43 Cole Wilcox; 22 Bryan Woo	**Catchers**: -- Willie MacIver; 5 Jhonny Pereda; 29 Cal Raleigh; **Infielders**: 96 Michael Arroyo; 1 Ryan Bliss; 33 Brendan Donovan; 4 Colt Emerson; -- Maikel García; 12 Josh Naylor; 76 Leo Rivas; 90 Brock Rodden; -- Michael Toglia; 2 Cole Young; **Outfielders**: -- Brennen Davis; -- Grant McCray; 99 Lázaro Montes; 20 Luke Raley; 44 Julio Rodríguez; **Designated hitters**: 8 Dominic Canzone		**Manager**: 18 Jason Kanzler; **Coaches**: 66 Fleming Baez (bullpen catcher); 40 Trent Blank (director of pitching strategy); 57 Carlos Cardoza (third base); 80 Danny Farquhar (assistant pitching); -- CJ Gillman (hitting); 11 Edgar Martínez (director of hitting strategy); 84 Jake McKinley (field coordinator); 60 Austin Nola (bullpen); 95 Justin Novak (bullpen catcher); -- Ed Paparella (hitting coordinator); -- Tanner Swanson (bench); 32 Pete Woodworth (pitching); Vacant (first base); Vacant (infield); 38 active, 0 inactive, 0 non-roster invitees; 7-, 10-, or 15-day injured list; * Not on active roster; ^{†} Suspended list; Roster, coaches, and NRIs updated November 18, 2026; Transactions • Depth chart; → All MLB rosters

=== Baseball Hall of Famers ===
The following elected members of the Baseball Hall of Fame spent part of their careers with the Mariners.

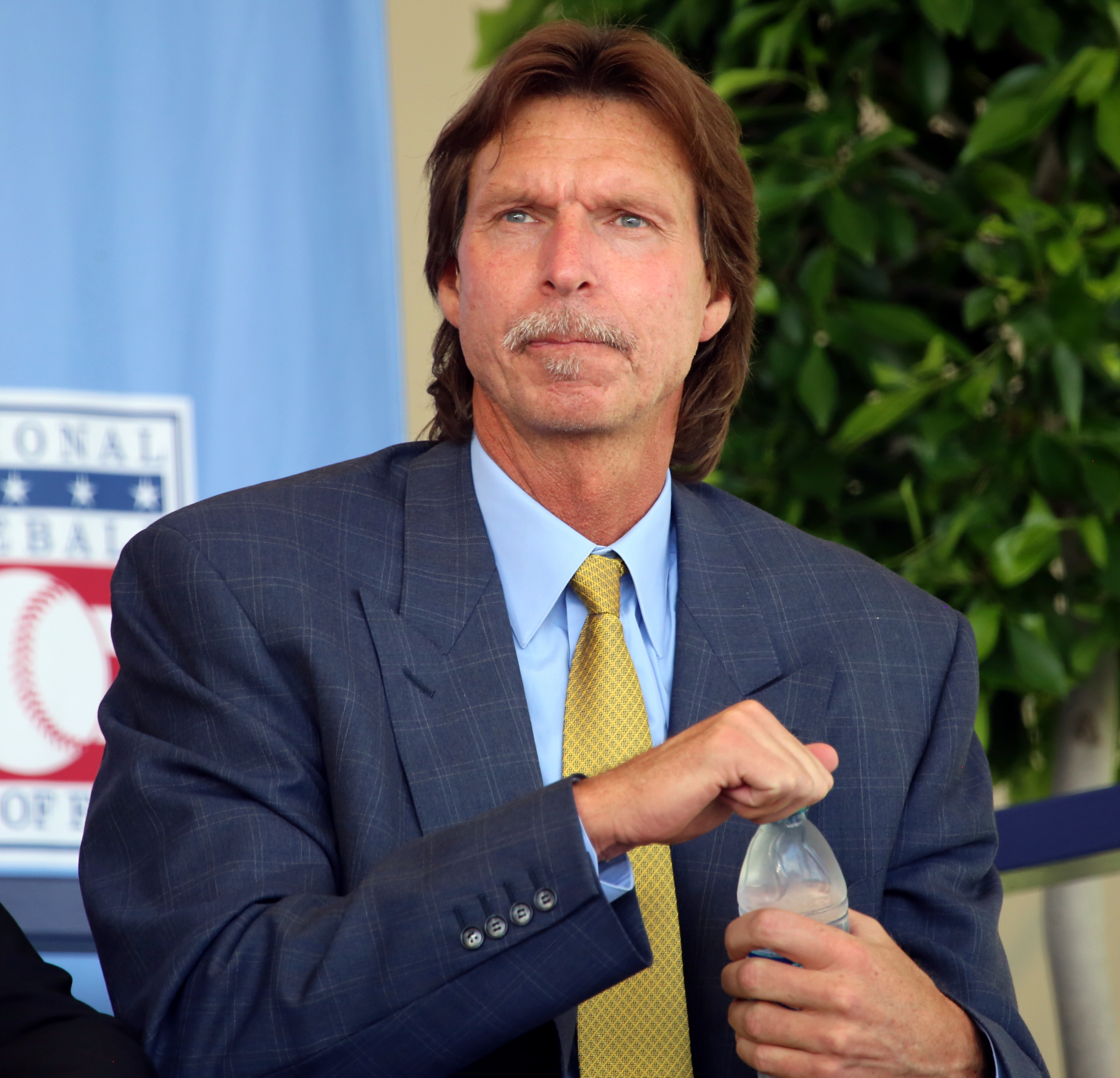
Randy Johnson

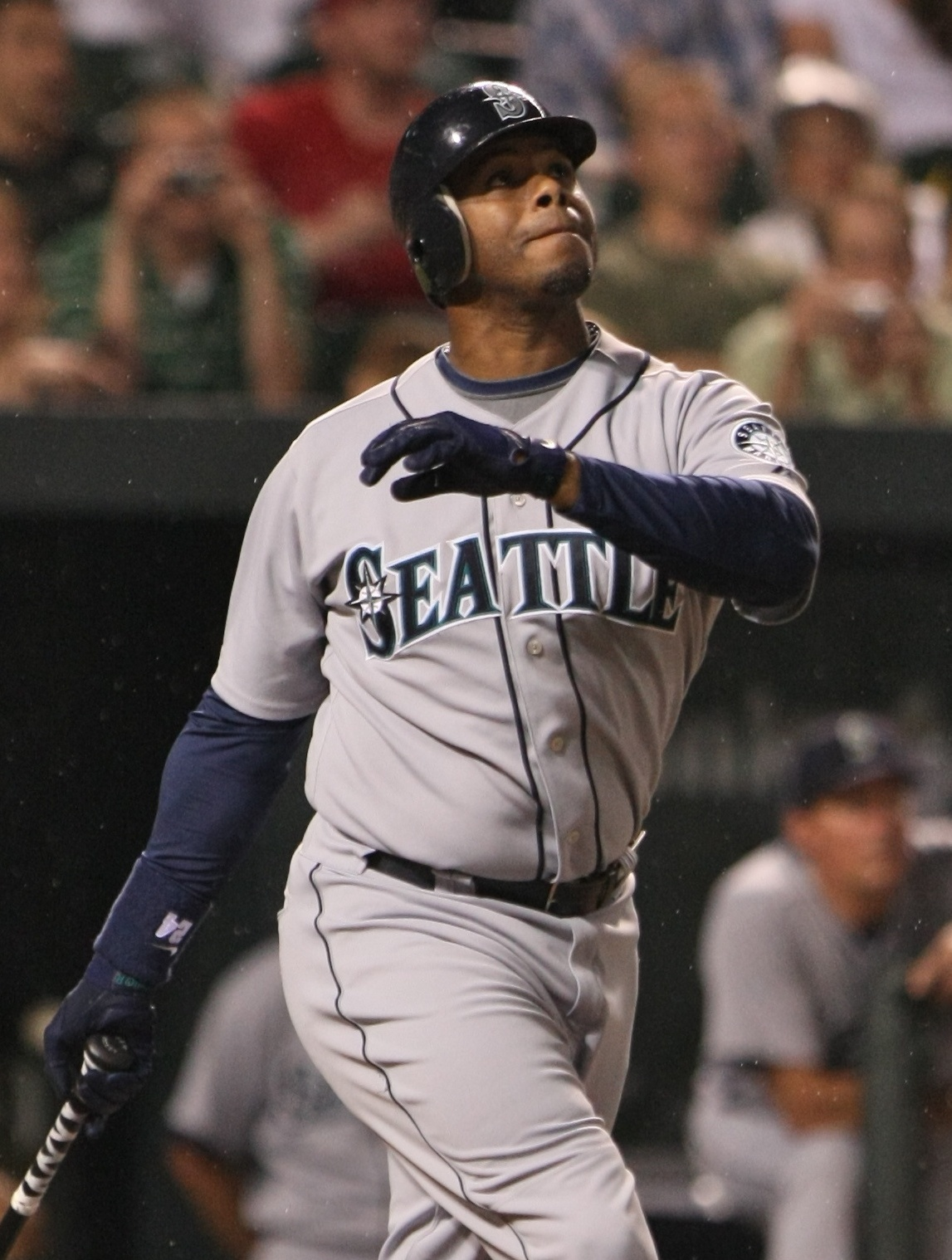
Ken Griffey Jr.

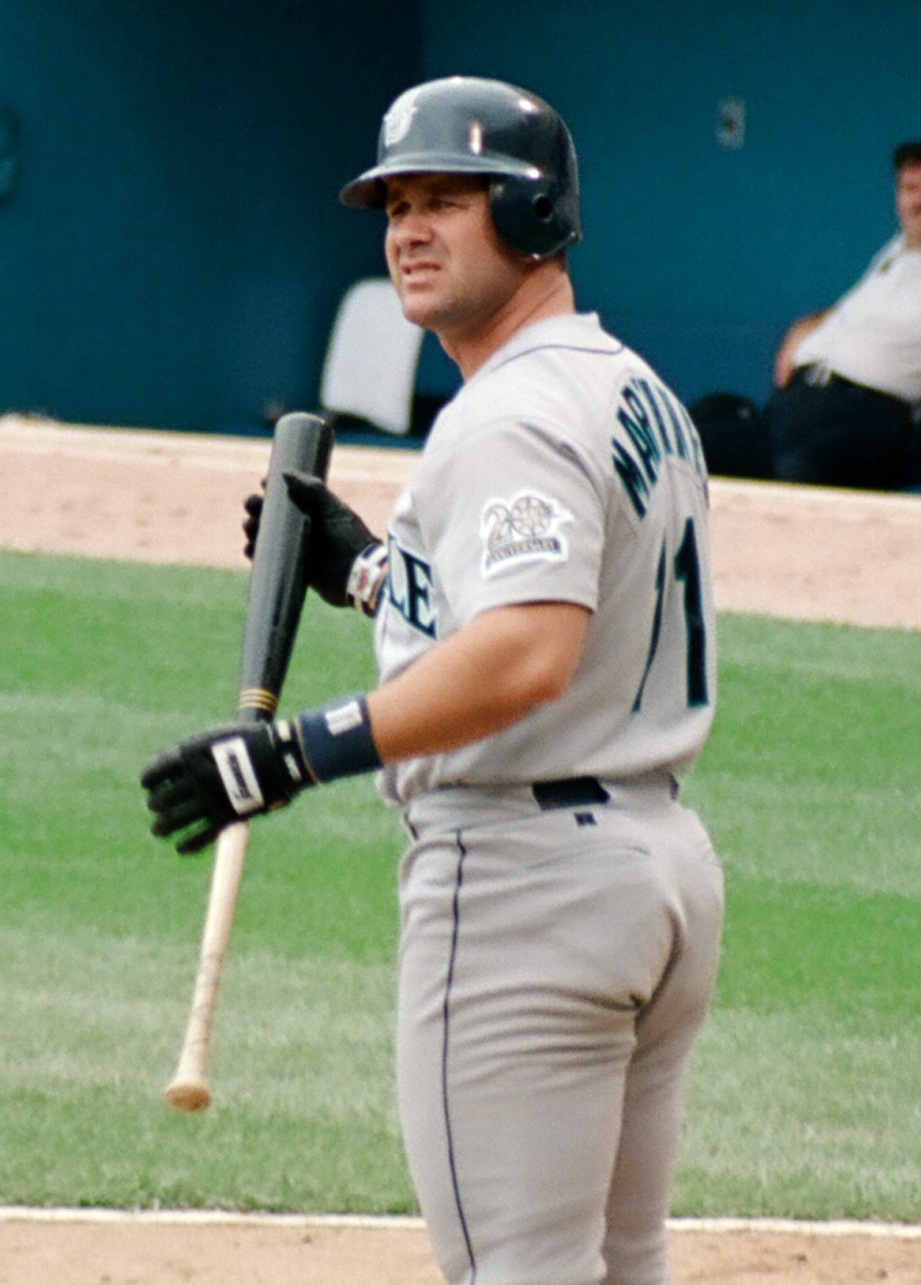
Edgar Martínez

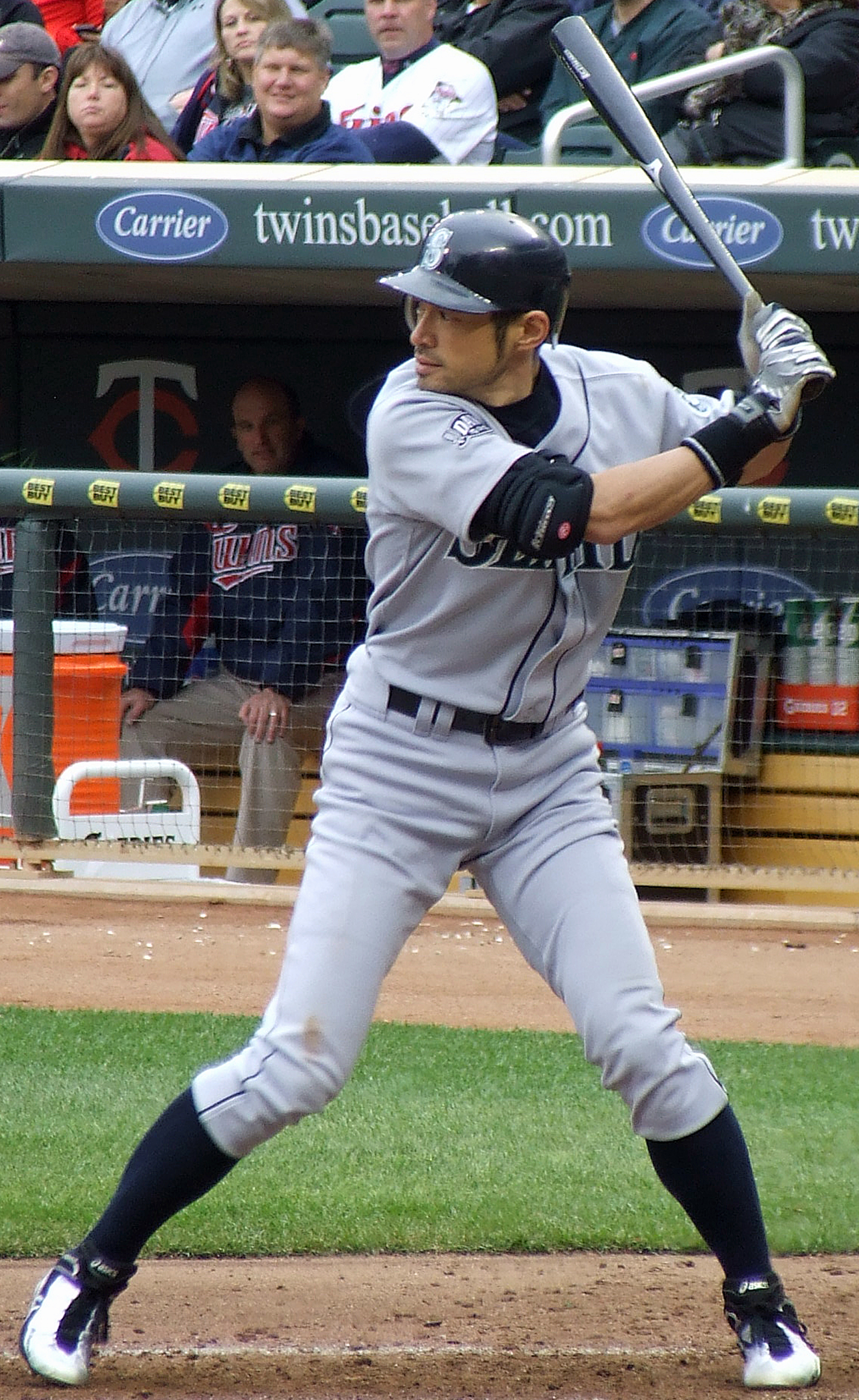
Ichiro Suzuki

Seattle Mariners Hall of Famers
Affiliation according to the National Baseball Hall of Fame and Museum
Seattle Mariners

Adrián Beltré
Pat Gillick

Goose Gossage
**Ken Griffey Jr.** *

Rickey Henderson
Randy Johnson

**Edgar Martínez** *
Gaylord Perry

**Ichiro Suzuki** *
Dick Williams

- Players and managers listed in **bold** are depicted on their Hall of Fame plaques wearing a Mariners cap insignia.
- * Seattle Mariners listed as primary team according to the Hall of Fame

=== Ford C. Frick Award recipients ===
Seattle Mariners Ford C. Frick Award recipients
Affiliation according to the National Baseball Hall of Fame and Museum

**Dave Niehaus**

- **Names in bold** received the award based primarily on their work as broadcasters for the Mariners.

=== State of Washington Sports Hall of Fame ===
**Seattle Mariners in the State of Washington Sports Hall of Fame**
No.	Name	Position	Tenure	Notes
4, 16, 38	Mike Blowers	3B	1992–1995, 1997, 1999	Attended the University of Washington.
21	Alvin Davis	1B	1984–1991	
24	Ken Griffey Jr.	CF	1989–1999; 2009–2010	
11	Edgar Martínez	DH/3B; Coach	1987–2004; 2015–2018	
—	Dave Niehaus	Broadcaster	1977–2010	
5	John Olerud	1B	2000–2004	Born in Seattle, attended Washington State University
—	Rick Rizzs	Broadcaster	1983–1992; 1996–2026	
30	Aaron Sele	P	2000–2001, 2005	Grew up in Poulsbo, attended Washington State University

== Minor league affiliations ==
The Seattle Mariners farm system consists of six minor league affiliates.

Seattle Mariners minor league affiliates
Class	Team	League	Location	Ballpark	Affiliated
Triple-A	Tacoma Rainiers	Pacific Coast League	Tacoma, Washington	Cheney Stadium	1995
Double-A	Arkansas Travelers	Texas League	North Little Rock, Arkansas	Dickey–Stephens Park	2017
High-A	Everett AquaSox	Northwest League	Everett, Washington	Funko Field	1995
Single-A	Inland Empire 66ers	California League	San Bernardino, California	San Manuel Stadium	2026
Rookie	ACL Mariners	Arizona Complex League	Peoria, Arizona	Peoria Sports Complex	1989
Rookie	DSL Mariners	Dominican Summer League	Boca Chica, Santo Domingo	Las Palmas Complex	1989

== Radio and television ==
The Mariners' flagship radio station is KIRO-AM, which previously broadcast Mariners contests from 1985 to 2002. Former flagship stations include KOMO, from 2003 to 2008, and KVI from 1977 to 1984. Television rights are held by MLB Local Media beginning in 2026, branded as "Mariners.TV". Games had been broadcast on cable network Root Sports Northwest, which the Mariners owned, until its closure after the 2025 season. In the past, Mariners games appeared in Seattle on over-the-air stations KING, KIRO, KTZZ, and KSTW. Selected Mariners games are also available on Canadian television due to an agreement between Root Sports Northwest and Rogers Sportsnet Pacific.

The Mariners made significant changes to their broadcast team in 2025, following the departure of long-time announcer Dave Sims in November 2024. Rick Rizzs is the primary radio play-by-play announcer with color commentator Gary Hill Jr. Aaron Goldsmith is the television play-by-play announcer, with a rotating group of commentators, including Angie Mentink and former Mariner players Jay Buhner, Ryan Rowland-Smith, and Dave Valle. Brad Adam and Jen Mueller are television reporters and hosts. Shannon Drayer is the radio pre-game and post-game host and clubhouse reporter. Steve Guasch is the Spanish-language radio broadcaster.

Dave Niehaus broadcast for the Mariners since their 1977 inaugural season until he died on November 10, 2010. For the 2011 and 2012 seasons, Niehaus's broadcast duties were filled by a collection of former Mariners broadcasters such as Ron Fairly, Ken Levine, and Ken Wilson and former Mariners players including Buhner, Valle, Dave Henderson, and Dan Wilson.

Tom Hutyler has been the Mariners' public address announcer since 1987, first at the Kingdome and now at T-Mobile Park. When KOMO AM was the Mariners' flagship radio station, Hutyler occasionally hosted the post-game radio show.

== Franchise records and award winners ==
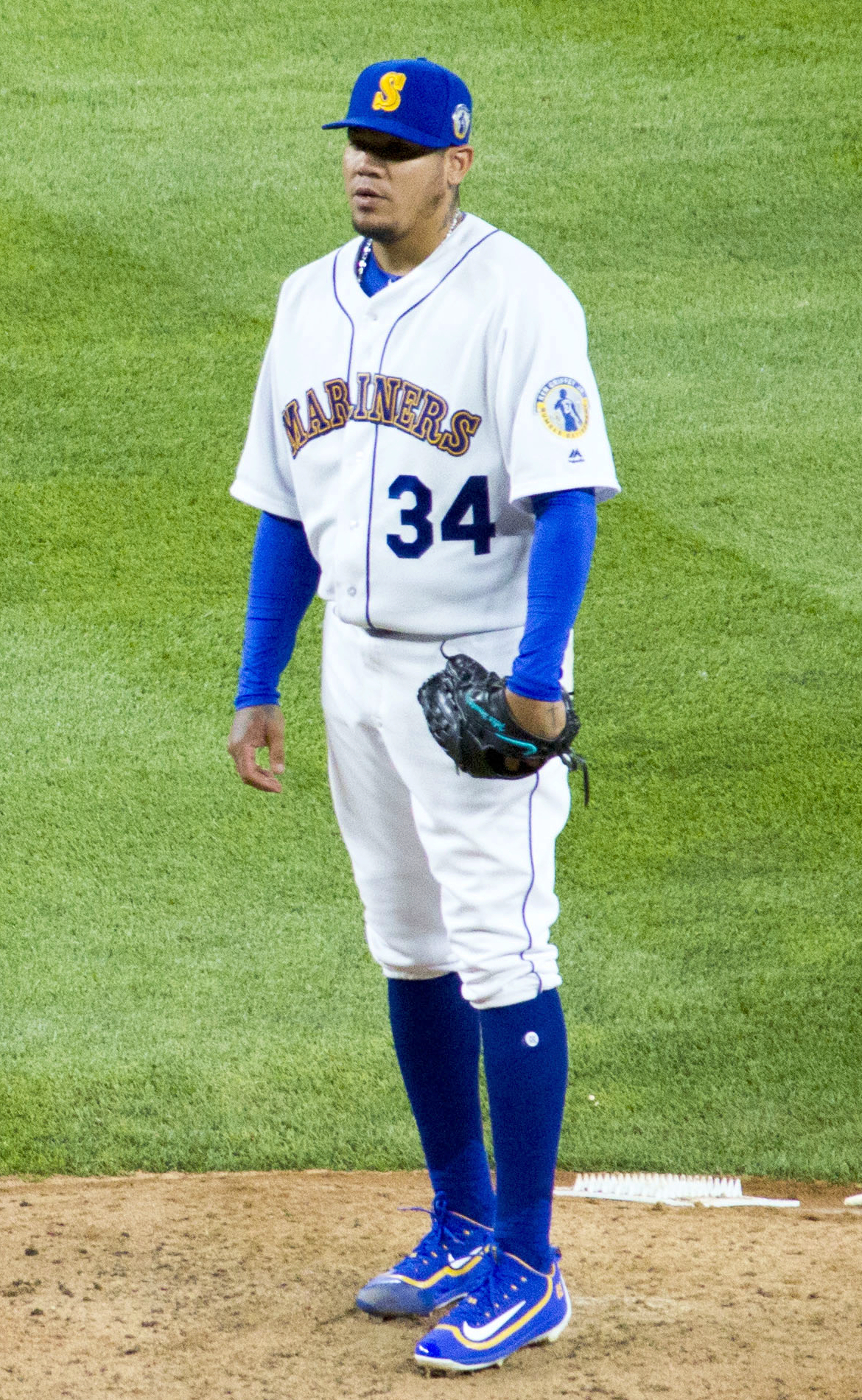
Félix Hernández is the franchise leader in wins (169) and strikeouts (2,524)

=== Season records ===
- Highest Batting Average: .372, Ichiro Suzuki (2004)
- Most Runs: 141, Alex Rodriguez (1996)
- Most Hits: 262, Ichiro Suzuki (2004) (Major League Record)
- Highest Slugging %: .674, Ken Griffey Jr. (1994)
- Highest On-Base %: .479, Edgar Martínez (1995)
- Highest On-Base Plus Slugging: 1.107, Edgar Martínez (1995)
- Most Doubles: 54, Alex Rodriguez (1996)
- Most Triples: 12, Ichiro Suzuki (2005)
- Most Home Runs: 60, Cal Raleigh (2025)
- Most Grand Slams: 4, Edgar Martínez (2000)
- Most RBIs: 147, Ken Griffey Jr. (1997)
- Most Stolen Bases: 60, Harold Reynolds (1987)
- Most Wins: 21, Jamie Moyer (2003)
- Lowest ERA: 2.14, Félix Hernández (2014)
- Most Strikeouts: 308, Randy Johnson (1993)
- Most Complete Games: 14, Mike Moore (1985) and Mark Langston (1987)
- Most Saves: 57, Edwin Díaz (2018)

=== Career records ===
Sources:

- Most Home Runs: 417, Ken Griffey Jr.
- Most RBIs: 1,261, Edgar Martínez
- Most Runs: 1,219, Edgar Martínez
- Most Walks: 1,283, Edgar Martínez
- Most Hits: 2,542, Ichiro Suzuki
- Most Stolen Bases: 438, Ichiro Suzuki
- Highest Batting Average: .321, Ichiro Suzuki
- Highest Slugging %: .561, Alex Rodriguez
- Highest On Base %: .418, Edgar Martínez
- Highest OPS: .934, Alex Rodriguez
- Most Games Played: 2,055, Edgar Martínez
- Lowest ERA: 3.24, Félix Hernández
- Lowest WHIP: 1.06, Logan Gilbert
- Most Innings Pitched: 2,729 2/3, Félix Hernández
- Most Wins: 169, Félix Hernández
- Most Strikeouts: 2,524, Félix Hernández
- Most Saves: 129, Kazuhiro Sasaki

== See also ==
- 1977 Major League Baseball expansion – Addition of the Seattle Mariners and Toronto Blue Jays
- 1995 American League West tie-breaker game – Major League Baseball tie-breaker game
- 2001 Major League Baseball All-Star Game
- Rick Kaminski – American stadium food hawker
- Seattle Rainiers
- Sports in Seattle
- The Double (Seattle Mariners) – Deciding play in a game of the 1995 American League Division Series
- Tuba Man – American tuba player in Seattle, Washington (1955–2008)
