= Oh My =

Oh My may refer to:

- Oh My!, a Swedish indiepop band
- "Oh My" (Dappy song), 2018
- "Oh My" (DJ Drama song), 2011
- "Oh My" (Gin Wigmore song), 2009
- "Oh My", by Ladyhawke from Ladyhawke, 2008
- "Oh My", by Haley Reinhart from Listen Up!, 2012
- "Oh My", by Illy from Two Degrees, 2016
- "Oh My!", by Seventeen from You Make My Day, 2018
- "Oh My...", a track from Undertale Soundtrack by Toby Fox, from the 2015 video game Undertale

== See also ==
- "Oops (Oh My)", a 2002 song by Tweet
- Oh My My (disambiguation)
- Oh My God (disambiguation)
- My Oh My (disambiguation)
