= 1995 American League West tie-breaker game =

Major League Baseball tie-breaker game

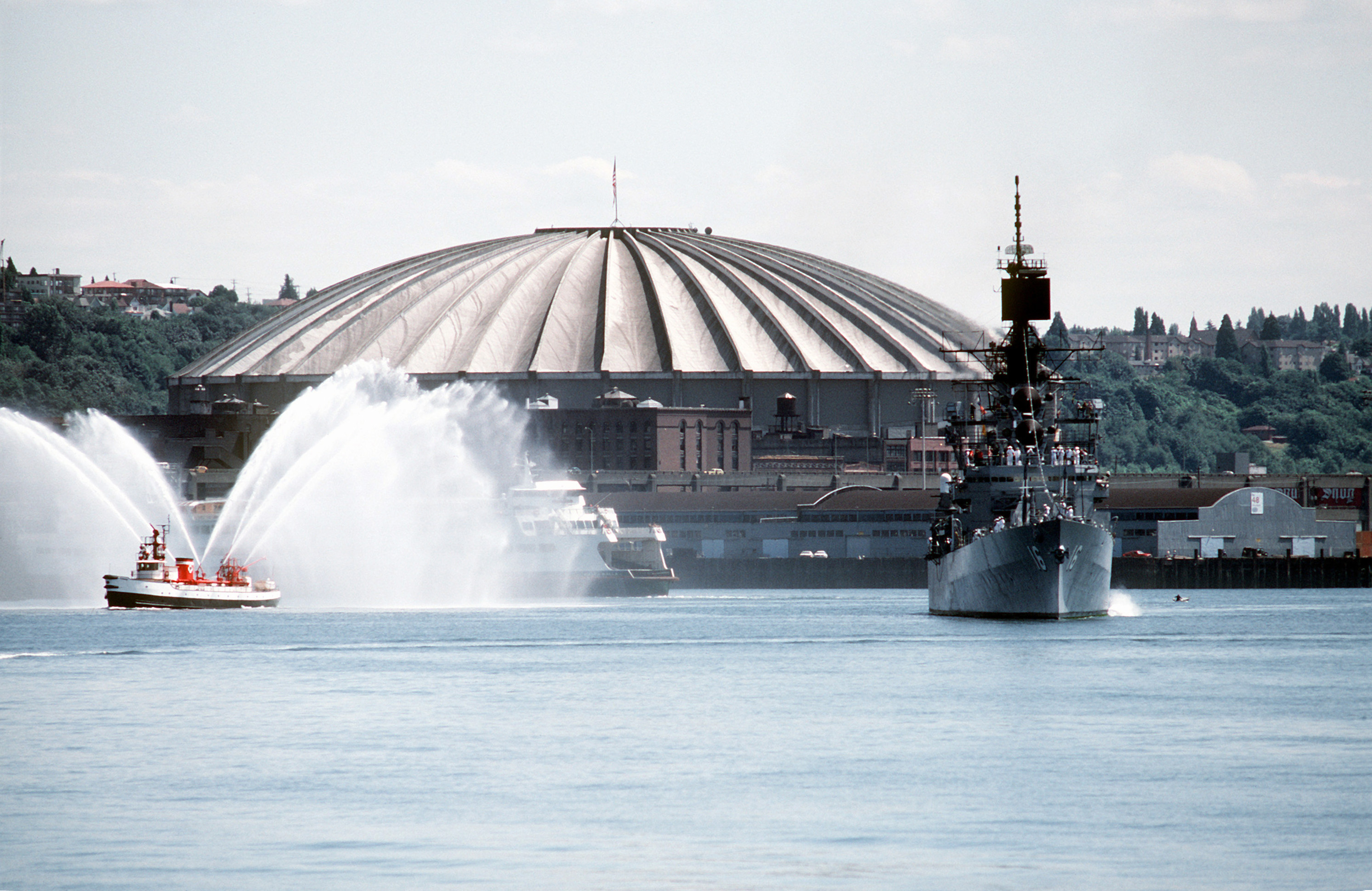
- The Kingdome in Seattle
	1	2	3	4	5	6	7	8	9	R	H	E
California Angels	0	0	0	0	0	0	0	0	1	1	3	1
Seattle Mariners	0	0	0	0	1	0	4	4	x	9	12	0
- Date: October 2, 1995
- Venue: The Kingdome
- City: Seattle, Washington
- Umpires: HP: John Shulock; 1B: Jim Evans; 2B: Larry Young; 3B: Greg Kosc; LF: Mark Johnson; RF: Ken Kaiser
- Attendance: 52,356
- Television: ESPN
- TV announcers: Jon Miller and Joe Morgan
- Radio: CBS; KMPC (CAL); KIRO (SEA)
- Radio announcers: CBS: Ernie Harwell and Al Downing; KMPC: Bob Starr and Mario Impemba; KIRO: Dave Niehaus and Rick Rizzs

The 1995 American League West tie-breaker game was a one-game extension to Major League Baseball's (MLB) 1995 regular season; the California Angels and Seattle Mariners met to determine the winner of the American League's (AL) West Division. It was played at the Kingdome in Seattle, on October 2, 1995.

The game was necessary after both teams finished the strike-shortened 144-game season with identical records of 78–66 (.542). Scoreless until the fifth inning, Seattle held a slim 1–0 lead at the seventh-inning stretch. The Mariners then broke it open and won 9–1 to secure the franchise's first postseason berth. It was counted as the 145th regular season game for both teams, with all the events in the game added to regular season statistics.

On August 3, the Angels were 56–33 (.629), 11 games ahead of the second place Texas Rangers, and 13 ahead of the third-place Mariners, at 43–46 (.483). By the end of the month, the Angels (67–50 (.573)) were on a six-game losing streak and their lead was trimmed to 7 1/2 games over both Texas and Seattle. On September 21, the Angels lost their seventh-straight and the Mariners pulled even at 72–63 (.533), with Texas four games behind. Five days later, Seattle had won its seventh straight and built a three-game lead with five to go. They were then shut out by the Angels. The Mariners won the first two games at Texas to clinch at least a tie with two remaining, but lost the last two while the Angels swept the Oakland Athletics to finish on a five-game winning streak.

At the time, the Angels' lead relinquishment was the third-largest in major league history, behind the 1978 Boston Red Sox and 1951 Brooklyn Dodgers.

After winning the tie-breaker, the Mariners met the New York Yankees in the AL Division Series. After two losses at Yankee Stadium, the second in 15 innings, Seattle swept the next three games at home, capped by an 11th-inning double by Edgar Martínez in Game 5. The Mariners hosted and won the opener of the AL Championship Series, but lost to the Cleveland Indians 4 games to 2. The Angels did not return to the postseason until 2002.

== Background ==
=== Before 1995 ===
Both teams entered the tiebreaker with long histories of frustration and disappointment. California had previously won three AL West Division titles (1979, 1982, and 1986), but never advanced to the World Series. In particular, the Angels lost a 2–0 series lead in the then-best-of-five 1982 ALCS to the Milwaukee Brewers, and were one strike away from defeating the Boston Red Sox in Game 5 of the 1986 ALCS but ended up losing that game and the next two to lose the best-of-seven series that they had led 3–1. They had not returned to the postseason since the 1986 loss.

Seattle, on the other hand, had only had two winning seasons since the franchise began play in 1977 (1991 and 1993), and had never been close to the postseason. The team had gone through three ownership changes in its first 15 years, its most recent coming in 1992 when a consortium led by Hiroshi Yamauchi bought the team from Jeff Smulyan, who had threatened to relocate the team as a consequence of its losing ways.

=== 1995 season ===
As a consequence of the 1994–95 Major League Baseball strike, the 1995 season started on April 25, and was shortened to 144 games instead of the normal 162. California took an early lead in the AL West standings and traded first place with the Texas Rangers through May and June. The Angels took the lead on July 2, and held on to that lead throughout the rest of July and all of August. Seattle, meanwhile, spent most of June through August in third or fourth place. They bottomed out on August 2, thirteen games out of first place and three games under .500.

The Angels' fortunes began to change when they were swept by the Boston Red Sox from August 21–23, then after winning one game, went into a 9-game losing streak beginning August 25. Seattle had an August record of 16–13 (.552), while California had an August record of 13–17 (.433). Seattle took second place on September 2, with Texas in a losing streak it never recovered from.

Then in September, California went into a second 9-game skid from September 13–23, allowing Seattle to take first place on September 22 in the middle of their own 7-game winning streak. California sank to three games behind with five games left in the season, but won all five,— a shutout of Seattle in the Kingdome followed by a four-game sweep of the Oakland Athletics—while Seattle lost their last two at Texas, forcing the tiebreaker.

Seattle received home field advantage for the tiebreaker by winning a coin toss late in the season (done in the event of multiple ties for the division or Wild Card), which was the format used for tiebreakers until 2009 as opposed to head-to-head matchups.

== Line score and summary ==
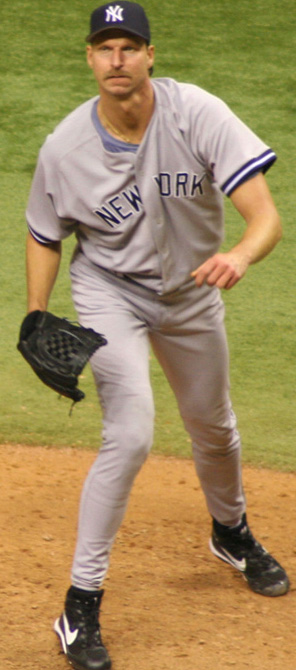
Randy Johnson, the Mariners' starting pitcher, later pitched for the Yankees

As per normal MLB practice at the time, the home team for this game was determined by a series of coin tosses held on September 18 to determine home teams for all potential one-game tiebreakers. All statistics compiled during the game were added to each player's and/or team's regular season statistics. The game was nationally televised on ESPN with Jon Miller and Joe Morgan making the call.

October 2, 1995 1:35 pm (PDT) at The Kingdome in Seattle, Washington
Team	1	2	3	4	5	6	7	8	9	R	H	E
California	0	0	0	0	0	0	0	0	1	1	3	1
Seattle	0	0	0	0	1	0	4	4	X	9	12	0
WP: Randy Johnson (18–2) LP: Mark Langston (15–7); Home runs: CAL: Tony Phillips (27); SEA: None; Attendance: 52,356

The first six innings of the game were largely a pitchers' duel between Seattle ace Randy Johnson and California's Mark Langston, the Mariners' former ace who was traded to the Montreal Expos for Johnson in 1989. Seattle put runners in scoring position in the first and fifth innings, but only scored one run in the fifth when Dan Wilson scored on a single by Vince Coleman. Johnson was perfect until the sixth inning, when Rex Hudler singled but was stranded at second base.

In the seventh inning, Langston allowed a single to Mike Blowers, then allowed Tino Martinez on base via fielder's choice, then hit Joey Cora to load the bases with two outs. Luis Sojo followed with a double to right field that glanced off of first baseman J. T. Snow's glove and rolled under the Angels' bullpen bench, scoring Blowers, Martinez, and Cora. Sojo himself scored on the play as a result of Langston's throwing error, and Langston was replaced by relief pitcher Bob Patterson.

Now trailing by five runs, the Angels threatened again in the eighth inning with runners on second and third, but Hudler grounded out to end the threat. In the bottom of the eighth, the Mariners again had the bases loaded when Tino Martinez singled to score Edgar Martínez, followed by a Dan Wilson double that scored Jay Buhner and Blowers, and finally a sacrifice fly double play hit by Cora that scored Tino Martinez, but got Wilson thrown out at third. Tony Phillips led off the ninth for the Angels with a home run to avoid a shutout, but Johnson retired the next three Angels hitters to record his sixth complete game and 18th win of the season.

== Impact ==
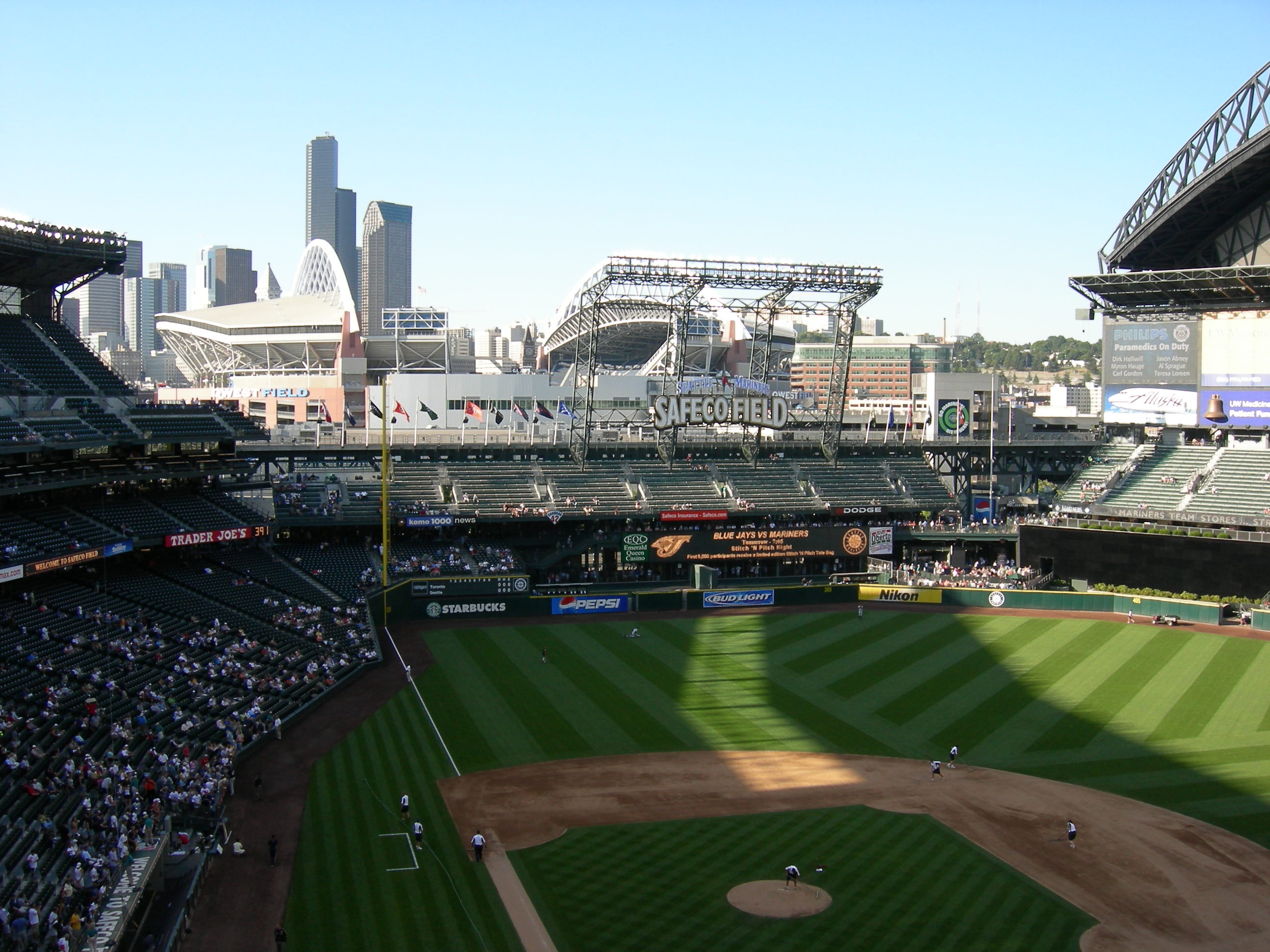
T-Mobile Park (then known as Safeco Field), the Mariners' current home ballpark

The Angels' defeat in the tiebreaker marked a continuation of the team's struggles at the time. It was the closest the Angels came to the postseason during their playoff drought that lasted from 1987 through 2001. They would return to the playoffs in 2002, and win their first (and so far only) World Series that year.

The game was a stepping stone in what is widely regarded in Seattle as the most memorable season in Mariners franchise history. Having secured their first ever postseason berth, the Mariners went on to play the New York Yankees in the ALDS. They would defeat the Yankees in Game 5 of the ALDS, on the heels of Edgar Martínez' series-winning double, but ultimately were defeated by the Cleveland Indians in the American League Championship Series, 4 games to 2.

The game marked the beginning of the most successful era in Seattle franchise history, as they would go on to win AL West Division championships again in 1997 and 2001 (with the latter seeing Seattle tie the Major League record with 116 wins), and an AL Wild Card berth in 2000. However, they failed to reach the World Series each time and remain the only MLB franchise to never reach the Fall Classic.

Off the field, the Mariners' AL West championship as well as its memorable run in the postseason served as a catalyst for public funding for a new ballpark. Less than two weeks before the tiebreaker, the residents of King County, Washington (whose county seat is Seattle) voted against a sales tax increase to fund a new stadium, but shortly after their ALDS victory, the Washington State Legislature reconvened and approved a separate funding package for a new stadium. The new stadium, now called T-Mobile Park, opened in July 1999.
