= Oh My My =

Oh My My may refer to:

- Oh My My (album), by OneRepublic, 2016
- "Oh My My" (the Monkees song), 1970
- "Oh My My" (Ringo Starr song), 1973
- Oh My My, an album by JTR, 2015
- "Oh My My", a song by Ani DiFranco from Evolve
- "Oh My My", a song by Blue October from This Is What I Live For
- "Oh My My", a song by Jane Siberry from Maria
- "Oh My My", a song by Jill Barber from Chances
- "Oh My My", a song by New Zealand band Nomad
- "Oh My My", a song by South Park Mexican from Time Is Money
- "Oh My My", an episode of ChalkZone

== See also ==
- There's No Sky (Oh My My), a 2009 album by Jaill
- "Mary's Song (Oh My My My)", a song by Taylor Swift from Taylor Swift
- Oh My (disambiguation)
- My Oh My (disambiguation)
