= My My =

My My may refer to:

- My-My (horse) (1957–1968), a show horse
- "My My (Bad Fruit)", a 2006 song by Mason Proper from the album There Is a Moth in Your Chest
- "My My", a 2010 song by Liz Phair from the album Funstyle
- "My My", a 2011 single by Korean girl group A Pink from the album Snow Pink
- "My My", a 2020 song by Seventeen from the EP Heng:garæ

== See also ==
- My My My (disambiguation)
- My Oh My (disambiguation)
