= Dave Niehaus =

American sportscaster (1935–2010)

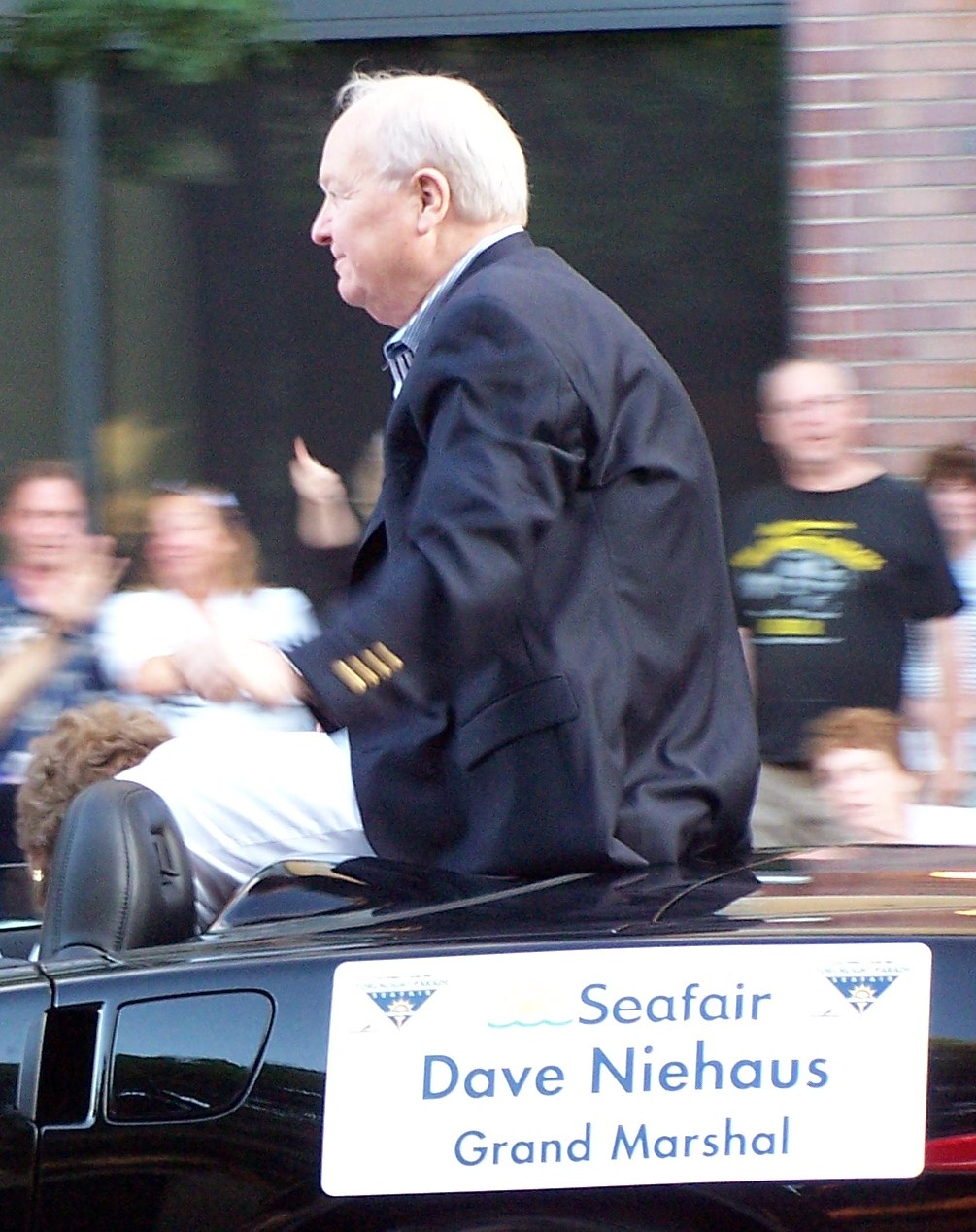
- Niehaus in 2007
- Born: David Arnold Niehaus; February 19, 1935; Princeton, Indiana, U.S.
- Died: November 10, 2010 (aged 75); Bellevue, Washington, U.S.
- Sports commentary career
- Teams: Seattle Mariners (1977–2010); California Angels (1969–1976)
- Sports: Baseball, basketball, football

David Arnold Niehaus (February 19, 1935 – November 10, 2010) was an American sportscaster. He was the lead play-by-play announcer for the American League's Seattle Mariners from their inaugural season in 1977 until his death after the 2010 season. In 2008, the National Baseball Hall of Fame awarded Niehaus the Ford C. Frick Award, the highest honor for American baseball broadcasters. Among fans nationwide and his peers, Niehaus was considered to be one of the greatest sportscasters in history.

== Biography ==
=== Early life and career ===
Niehaus was born and raised in Princeton, Indiana. He graduated from Indiana University in 1957, entered the military, and began his broadcasting career with Armed Forces Radio. He became a partner of Dick Enberg on the broadcast team of the California Angels in 1969. Niehaus also broadcast for the Los Angeles Rams of the NFL and the UCLA Bruins football and basketball teams during this period.

=== Seattle Mariners ===
In 1977, Danny Kaye, part-owner of the Seattle Mariners expansion team, recruited Niehaus to become the franchise's radio voice. Despite working for a franchise which from its first year in 1977 until 1991 was without a winning season, Niehaus's talent gained recognition, and he was considered one of the few attractions for Mariners fans. Even in the period before the team's memorable 1995 season, the Mariners were regularly one of the leading Major League Baseball teams in terms of the percentage of radios in use.

Niehaus became immensely popular in Seattle, twice being named Washington Sportscaster of the Year.

The team chose him to throw out the ceremonial first pitch at the opening of its new ballpark, Safeco Field, on July 15, 1999. That same year, Niehaus was added to the Nintendo 64 game Ken Griffey Jr.'s Slugfest as an announcer during gameplay. In 2000 he was the second person to be inducted into the Mariners Hall of Fame, and in 2008, he was named the winner of the Ford C. Frick Award, which recognizes career excellence in baseball broadcasting and is considered the highest baseball broadcasting honor.

As of the end of the 2007 season, Niehaus had called 4,817 of the 4,899 games the Mariners had played since their inception. May 7, 2009, was Niehaus' 5,000th game as a Mariners broadcaster. Niehaus broadcast 5,284 of the 5,385 Mariners games which had taken place as of the end of the 2010 season, and had intended to broadcast the full 2011 season.

=== Notable catchphrases ===
Niehaus is noted for using the following catchphrases on Mariner broadcasts:

- "My, oh my!" – a variant of former Angels partner Enberg's "Oh, my!", used for big, exciting plays.
- "Swung on and belted!" – used on long fly balls that may go over the wall for a home run.
- "It will fly away!" (sometimes "Fly, fly away!") – used for home runs.
- "Get out the rye bread and mustard, Grandma, it is grand salami time!" – used for a grand slam home run by a Mariners player.
- "Get out the rye bread and the mustard this time, Grandma! It is a Grand Salami! And the Mariners lead it, 10-6! I don't believe it! My, oh, my!" – used when Edgar Martinez broke a 6–6 tie in the bottom of the 8th inning on October 7, 1995.
- "The Mariners have erupted!" – used during scoring outbursts

=== Notable nicknames coined ===
- "A-Rod" – first to call Alex Rodriguez "A-Rod"
- "Death to Flying Things" – first to call Franklin Gutiérrez by his nickname
- "The Kid" – Niehaus's name for Ken Griffey Jr.

==== Notable calls ====
"The Double"
Niehaus' winning call of the 1995 American League Division Series, one of the most iconic calls in sports broadcasting history.

Now the left-hander ready, branding iron hot. The 1–2 pitch, K inserted. It’s over! Right over the heart of the plate. Randy looks to the skies that is covered by the dome and bedlam as the Mariners now erupt! Everybody charging Randy Johnson out there…19 long years of frustration is over…my friends, this is just indescribable.

— Calling the final out against the California Angels in the one-game AL West playoff in 1995.

Right now, the Mariners looking for the tie. They would take a fly ball. They would love a base hit into the gap and they could win it with Junior's speed. The stretch... and the 0-1 pitch on the way to Edgar Martínez, swung on and LINED DOWN THE LEFT FIELD LINE FOR A BASE HIT! HERE COMES JOEY! HERE IS JUNIOR TO THIRD BASE, THEY'RE GOING TO WAVE HIM IN! THE THROW TO THE PLATE WILL BE LATE! THE MARINERS ARE GOING TO PLAY FOR THE AMERICAN LEAGUE CHAMPIONSHIP! I DON'T BELIEVE IT! IT JUST CONTINUES! MY, OH MY! EDGAR MARTÍNEZ WITH A DOUBLE RIPPED DOWN THE LEFT FIELD LINE AND THEY ARE GOING CRAZY AT THE KINGDOME!

— Calling "The Double", hit by Edgar Martínez, which scored Joey Cora and Ken Griffey Jr. to win the 1995 American League Division Series in the 5th and final game.

And a ground ball back up the middle! And there it is! He's the new all-time Hit King in Major League history, number 2-5-8! My, oh my!

— Calling Ichiro Suzuki's record-breaking 258th hit off Ryan Drese, passing George Sisler for the most hits in a regular season.

=== Death ===
Heart problems had forced Niehaus to undergo two angioplasties in 1996, causing him to stop smoking and change his diet. On November 10, 2010, he suffered a heart attack at his home in Bellevue, Washington while preparing to barbecue some ribs on his deck. He died that day at the age of 75.

In a formal statement, Mariners Chairman Howard Lincoln and President Chuck Armstrong said "Dave has truly been the heart and soul of this franchise since its inception in 1977... He truly was the fans' connection to every game." Washington governor Chris Gregoire said "Today the Pacific Northwest lost one of its sports icons...Dave was an institution here starting with the team's first pitch in 1977. With all due respect to the great Alvin Davis, Dave is 'Mr. Mariner.'" At news of Niehaus's death, tributes came from Jay Buhner, Ken Griffey Jr., Seattle Mayor Mike McGinn, other Mariners broadcasters, and fans.

=== Legacy ===
Prior to the Mariners' home opener in 2011 against the Cleveland Indians, the city of Seattle and King County declared April 8 "My oh My! Dave Niehaus Day." After a successful petition drive by fans Glen Garnett and Mark Caylor, the city also gave the block of First Avenue S. between Edgar Martínez Dr. S. and S. Royal Brougham Way the honorary designation of Dave Niehaus Way S. A sign which paid tribute to Niehaus was unveiled in the press area.

On December 22, 2010, Seattle rapper Macklemore released a song called "My Oh My" in tribute to Niehaus. It describes the sportscaster's influence on not only Macklemore's own childhood but the lives of Seattleites in general. The song also features the audio clip of the winning call from the 1995 American League Division Series. When it was debuted by a radio host, numerous calls were received from Mariners fans who had pulled over on the highway in tears from the lyrical work and memory of Niehaus. Macklemore performed the song at Safeco Field on Opening Day 2011 during the team's tribute to the late broadcaster.

A bronze statue of Niehaus was unveiled on September 16, 2011, at Safeco Field. Niehaus's longtime broadcast partner Rick Rizzs presided over the private unveiling ceremony. The statue is located on the main concourse near Section 105 in right centerfield. It depicts Niehaus sitting at a desk behind a microphone, with his scorebook in front of him. Sculptor Lou Cella viewed dozens of photos before creating the statue, which was first sculpted in clay, then cast in bronze. There is an empty seat next to the statue, allowing fans to sit next to Niehaus and pose for photos.
