= Me Me Me =

Me Me Me may refer to:

- Me Me Me (album), a 1998 album by antifolk singer/songwriter Major Matt Mason USA
- Me Me Me (band), an English supergroup
- Me Me Me, a 2011 musical feature-length film written and produced by Jonathan King
- "Me Me Me" (song), a 2007 song by Welsh rock band Kids in Glass Houses, from their EP E-Pocalype!
- Me. Me. Me., a 1995 album by American indie rock band Air Miami
- Me! Me! Me!, a 2009 album by Japanese-American recording artist Joe Inoue
- "Me!Me!Me!", a song by TeddyLoid and Daoko, and the third episode of the Japan Animator Expo
