= The Double (Seattle Mariners) =

Deciding play in a game of the 1995 American League Division Series

1995 ALDS Game 5
| New York Yankees | Seattle Mariners |
|---|---|
| 5 | 6 |
| | 1 | 2 | 3 | 4 | 5 | 6 | 7 | 8 | 9 | 10 | 11 | R | H | E |
|---|---|---|---|---|---|---|---|---|---|---|---|---|---|---|
| New York Yankees | 0 | 0 | 0 | 2 | 0 | 2 | 0 | 0 | 0 | 0 | 1 | 5 | 6 | 0 |
| Seattle Mariners | 0 | 0 | 1 | 1 | 0 | 0 | 0 | 2 | 0 | 0 | 2 | 6 | 15 | 0 |
- Date: October 8, 1995
- Venue: Kingdome
- City: Seattle, Washington
- Managers: Buck Showalter (New York Yankees); Lou Piniella (Seattle Mariners)
- Attendance: 57,411
- Time of game: 4:19
- Television: ABC
- TV announcers: Brent Musburger, Jim Kaat and Jack Arute
- Radio: KIRO (SEA)
- Radio announcers: KIRO: Dave Niehaus and Rick Rizzs

The Double was a walk-off double hit by the Seattle Mariners' Edgar Martínez in the deciding Game 5 of Major League Baseball's 1995 American League Division Series on October 8, 1995. Trailing by one run in the bottom half of the 11th inning, with Joey Cora on third base and Ken Griffey Jr. on first, Martinez's hit drove in Cora and Griffey, giving the Mariners a 6–5 victory over the New York Yankees to clinch the series, 3–2. The play is held to be the "biggest hit in franchise history".

Amid rumors that the team would be sold and/or relocated, the Mariners—who had produced only two winning seasons (1991 and 1993) since beginning play in 1977—mounted a late-season comeback in 1995 to clinch their first postseason appearance in franchise history. They then mounted a series of comebacks in the ALDS, first overcoming a 2-game series deficit to force a deciding Game 5, then tying Game 5 in the 8th inning to force extra innings, and finally a one-run 11th inning deficit that was overcome by the Double.

The hit is regarded as the defining moment of Martinez's 18-year Hall of Fame career. Mariners broadcaster Dave Niehaus' call of the play—which is equally memorable to Mariners fans as the play itself—is also regarded as the highlight of his career. The play is also credited with keeping a Major League Baseball team in the city of Seattle, as it helped garner support for a new taxpayer-funded stadium for the Mariners. That stadium, known today as T-Mobile Park (it was originally known as Safeco Field through the end of the 2018 season), opened in 1999, with the Double depicted in a mural as part of the stadium's art collection.

== Background ==
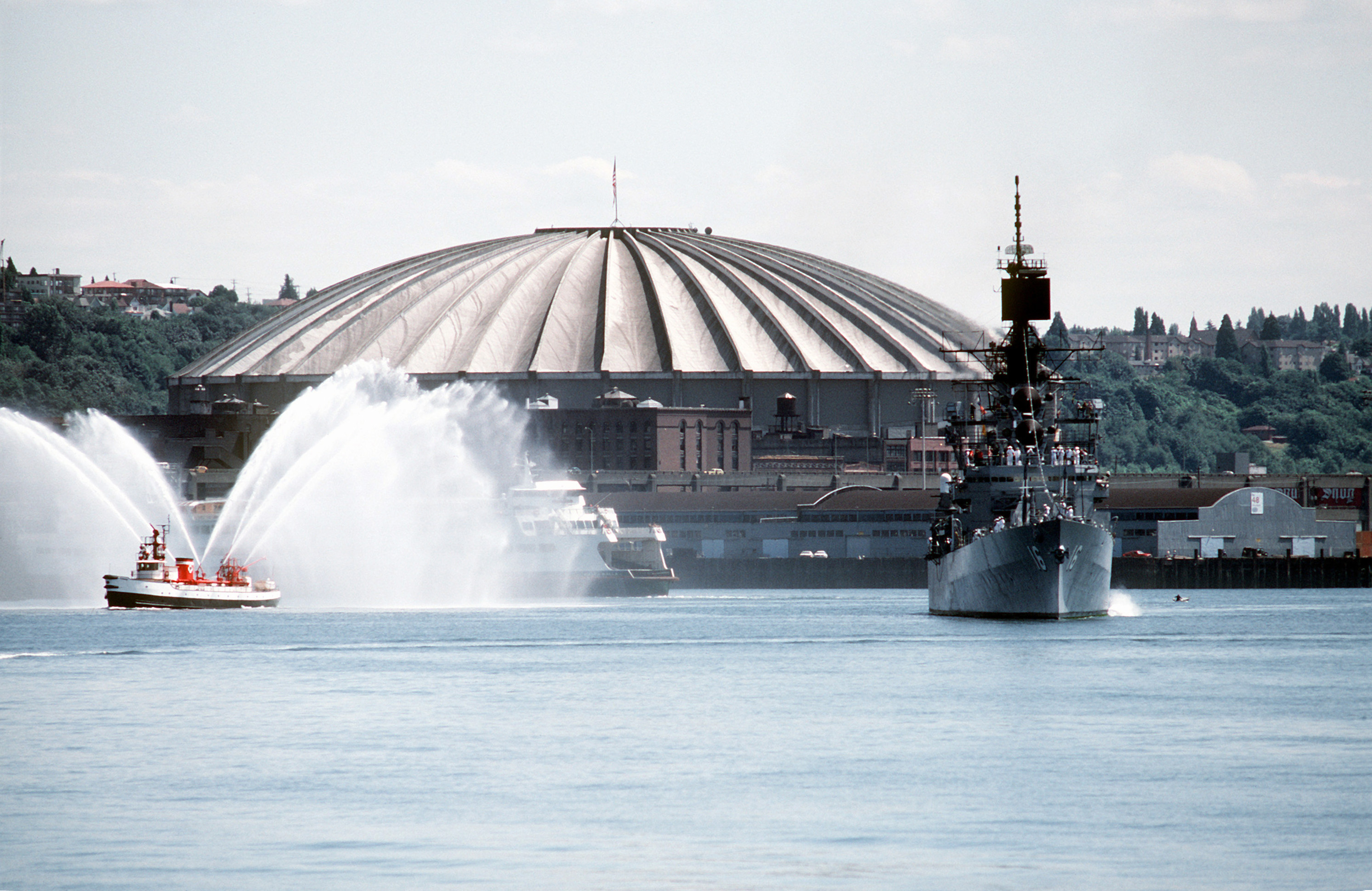
The Kingdome, the Mariners' home stadium from 1977–1999, and site of The Double.

=== Relocation rumors ===
For several years the Mariners had been dogged by rumors that the team's ownership group led by Jeff Smulyan had been considering selling and/or relocating the team to a different city. This was primarily due to low attendance and revenue caused by the team's losing ways (prior to 1995, they only had two seasons with a winning percentage over .500). In addition, the Kingdome was known for its drab baseball environment and it was beginning to fall apart, causing Mariners games to require rescheduling in 1994.

In 1992, Smulyan's ownership group sold the Mariners to the Baseball Club of Seattle, a consortium led by Hiroshi Yamauchi and later Nintendo of America. Almost immediately, the new ownership group began campaigning with local and state governments to gain public funding for a new stadium. (In 2016, Nintendo of America sold most shares of Seattle Mariners ownership held by it to a new ownership group, though Nintendo retained a 10% ownership of the team after the sale was completed.)

In an election held on September 19, 1995, the residents of King County voted against a 0.1-percentage-point sales tax increase to fund the building of a replacement stadium. As a result, the ownership group set an October 30 deadline for local leadership to come up with a plan to finance a new stadium, or they would put the team up for sale.

=== Mariners make the postseason ===
After being as many as 13 games out of first place at the beginning of August, the Mariners mounted a late-season comeback that, coupled with a late-season collapse by the California Angels, forced a tiebreaker game between the teams. The Mariners won the tiebreaker, 9–1, winning their first division title and first postseason trip in franchise history.

In the ALDS, the Mariners quickly fell into a 2–0 deficit to the heavily favored Yankees in the best-of-five series. However, the Mariners won the next two games and forced a "winner-takes-all" Game 5 at the Kingdome.

== The play ==
After the Yankees took a 4–2 lead on a Don Mattingly 2-RBI double in the 6th inning, the Mariners came back to tie the score at 4 in the 8th inning and eventually forced extra innings. In the top of the 11th inning, the Yankees scored a run on an RBI single by Randy Velarde off of Mariners ace Randy Johnson and were three outs from reaching the American League Championship Series.

In the bottom half of the inning, Yankees ace Jack McDowell, who had entered the game in the 9th inning for a rare relief appearance, faced Joey Cora, Ken Griffey Jr., and Edgar Martínez—the second, third, and fourth batters in the Mariners' order, respectively. Second baseman Cora dragged a bunt down the first base line and reached first base safely on an infield hit. Yankees manager Buck Showalter argued the call, believing Cora should have been called out for running off the baselines; however, the umpires' ruling stood. Center fielder Griffey singled to short right-center field, allowing Cora to reach third base. Designated hitter Martinez then doubled down the left field line, scoring Cora with the tying run and Griffey with the winning run. The Mariners' dugout emptied and mobbed Griffey, Martinez, and Cora on the field in celebration of the franchise's first ever playoff series victory.

=== Dave Niehaus' call ===
"1995 AL Division Series Winning Call"
The winning call of the 1995 American League Division Series as called by Dave Niehaus, one of his most famous calls.

Dave Niehaus's radio call of the Double is as memorable to Seattle fans as the play itself and became one of the hallmarks of Niehaus's Ford C. Frick Award-winning career:

Right now, the Mariners looking for the tie. They would take a fly ball; they would love a base hit into the gap and they could win it with Junior's speed. The stretch and the 0–1 pitch on the way to Edgar Martínez; swung on and LINED DOWN THE LEFT FIELD LINE FOR A BASE HIT! Here comes Joey! Here is Junior to third base, they're going to wave him in! The throw to the plate will be...LATE! The Mariners are going to play for the American League Championship! I don't believe it! It just continues! My oh My! Edgar Martínez with a double ripped down the left field line and they are going crazy at the Kingdome!

=== Brent Musburger's call ===
ABC Sports through The Baseball Network broadcast the Double on television. Brent Musburger along with color commentator Jim Kaat and field reporter Jack Arute called Game 5:

No balls and a strike to Martínez. Line drive, we are tied! Griffey is coming around! In the corner is Bernie. He's going to try to score! Here's the division championship! Mariners win it! Mariners win it!

Musburger's call, dramatic as it was, incorrectly implied that Bernie Williams fielded the double in left. Bernie was playing center field at the time. Gerald Williams was in left field playing the ball and making the late throw back to the infield.

=== John Sterling's call ===
In New York, the Double was described on radio by John Sterling on WABC:

It'll be an 0-1; the pitch...LINED...base hit down the left field line! The tying run scores! Griffey heads towards third...he's being sent in! The throw home is...not in time! Seattle wins! Seattle wins the Division Series on a double by Edgar Martínez!

=== Ernie Harwell's call ===
CBS handled the national radio coverage of the Double with Ernie Harwell on the call alongside color commentator Al Downing.

The pitch...SWING...base hit, left field! Here comes Cora, he'll score. Here comes Griffey, rounding third. He's being waved home! Here comes the relay...from Fernández! SLIDES...and the Mariners win it in the 11th inning on a base hit by Edgar Martínez! A thrilling finish and they will battle the Cleveland Indians for the American League championship! The final score, Seattle 6 and the Yankees 5! You're listening to the Division Series from CBS Radio Sports!

== Off-field significance and legacy ==
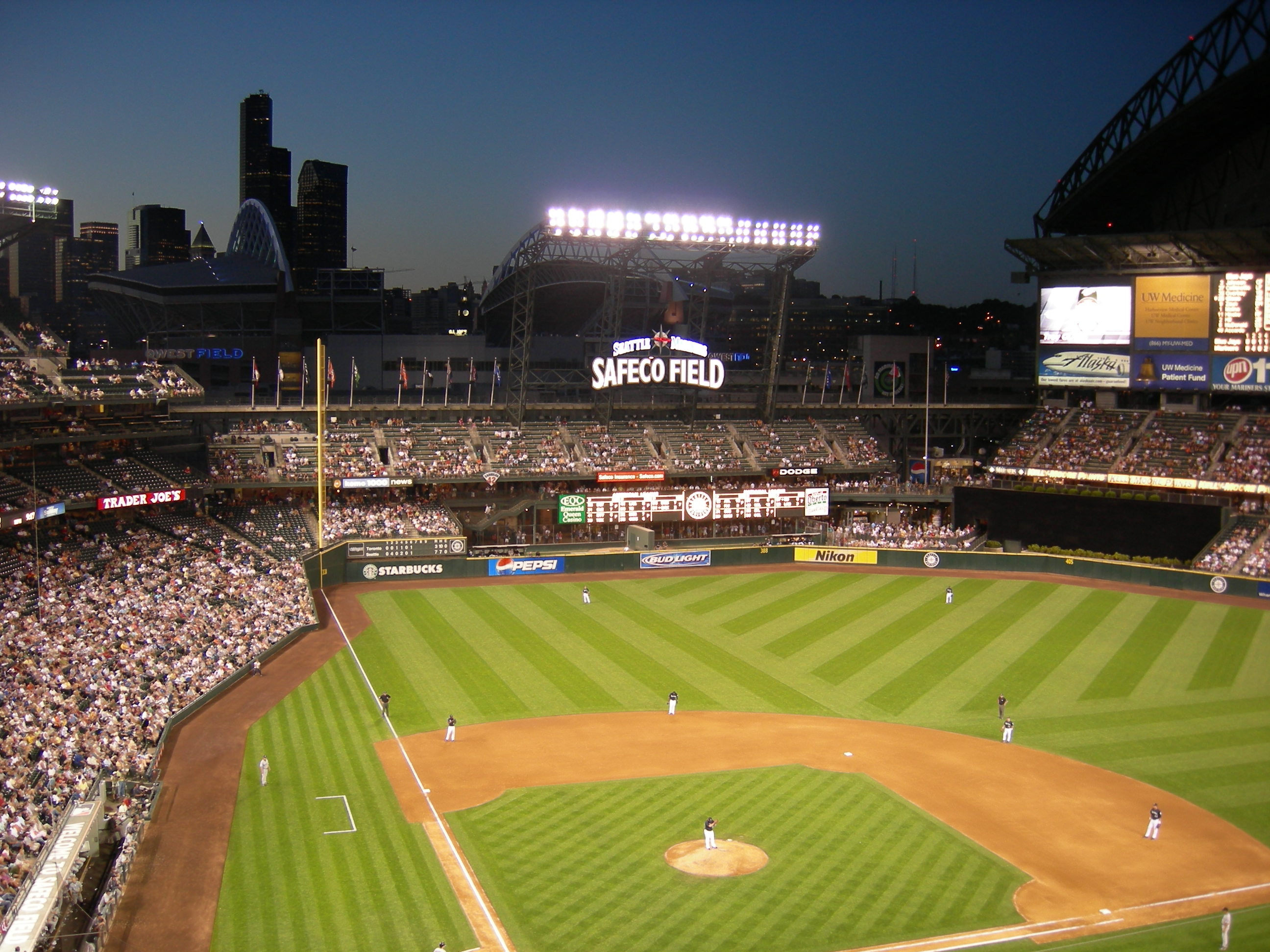
T-Mobile Park (formerly Safeco Field), home of the Mariners since 1999. The Double is credited with helping to spur public funding for it.

=== Keeping the Mariners in Seattle ===
The Mariners' late season comeback, their first division title in franchise history, and ultimately the Double, brought the Seattle fan base back to life and sparked a desire to keep the team in town. Lou Piniella, the Mariners' manager from 1993 to 2002, called Martínez's hit and the 1995 postseason "the hit, the run, the game, the series and the season that saved baseball in Seattle." Soon after the events of October 8, the Washington State Legislature held a special session and approved an alternative funding package to enable the building of a new ballpark, which culminated in the construction of Safeco Field. Since 2019, the ballpark has been known as T-Mobile Park.

=== Legacy ===
Ken Griffey Jr. (center) and the Seattle Mariners celebrate after he scored the winning run in Game 5 of the 1995 ALDS.

The Double is regarded by Seattle fans and Martínez himself as the defining moment of Martínez's 18-year Major League Baseball career – which was played exclusively with the Mariners – and was one of several highlights of Mariners franchise history in which Martínez played a major role. In 2004, the city of Seattle renamed a street near T-Mobile Park "Edgar Martínez Drive" to honor Martínez's contributions to the Mariners, including his double that "saved baseball in Seattle." Martínez was inducted into the Seattle Mariners Hall of Fame in 2007, and he was subsequently inducted into the National Baseball Hall of Fame in 2019.

In 2007, when Griffey returned to Seattle for the first time since his 1999 trade to the Cincinnati Reds, the image of him at the bottom of the dog-pile after scoring the winning run was included in a photo collage of highlights of Griffey's Mariners career. It was presented to him by former teammates Martínez and Jay Buhner (both retired by then).

The image of Griffey sliding into home plate has been immortalized at T-Mobile Park in a mural created by Thom Ross called The Defining Moment.

Griffey's slide into home plate was also the inspiration behind the title of the 1996 video game Ken Griffey Jr.'s Winning Run.

The game would be Buck Showalter's last as Yankees manager and Don Mattingly's final game as a player before his retirement. During the offseason the Yankees would acquire Mariners first baseman Tino Martinez, who would go on to be part of the Yankees' 1996 World Series winning team, their first under new manager Joe Torre.

The play is featured prominently in Jon Bois' third episode of Dorktown: The History of the Seattle Mariners.

== Scoring ==
Summary – bottom of the 11th inning
| Pitcher New York Yankees | Batter Seattle Mariners | Result (outs in bold) | Score Mariners – Yankees |
|---|---|---|---|
| Jack McDowell (R) | Joey Cora (S) | Bunt single | 4–5 |
| Jack McDowell (R) | Ken Griffey Jr. (L) | Single to center; Cora to third | 4–5 |
| Jack McDowell (R) | Edgar Martinez (R) | Double to left; Cora and Griffey scored | 6–5 |

== See also ==
- 1995 Seattle Mariners season
- 1995 New York Yankees season
- 1995 American League Division Series
- 1995 American League West tie-breaker game
- List of nicknamed MLB games and plays
