= My Oh My =

My Oh My may refer to:

== Catchphrase ==
- "My, oh my!", a catchphrase used by American sportscaster Dave Niehaus

== Music ==
- My Oh My, a 2002 album by Jeff & Sheri Easter

=== Songs ===
- "My Oh My" (Aqua song), 1997
- "My Oh My" (Ava Max song), 2024
- ”My Oh My” (Camila Cabello song), 2019
- "My Oh My" (Chantay Savage song), 1999
- "My Oh My" (Kylie Minogue, Bebe Rexha and Tove Lo song), 2024
- "My Oh My" (Sad Café song), 1980
- "My Oh My" (Slade song), 1983
- "My, Oh My" (The Wreckers song), 2006
- "My Oh My", a 2010 tribute song to Dave Niehaus by Macklemore and Ryan Lewis from The Heist
- "My Oh My", a song by Leonard Cohen from Popular Problems
- "My Oh My", a song by Girls' Generation from Love & Peace
- "My Oh My", a song by Gotthard from Silver
- "My Oh My", a song by David Gray from White Ladder
- "My Oh My", a song by Punch Brothers from The Phosphorescent Blues
- "My Oh My", a song by Tristan Prettyman from Cedar + Gold

== See also ==
- Me Oh My, a 2009 album by Cate Le Bon
- Oh My My (disambiguation)
- My My (disambiguation)
