= Jamie Moyer =

American baseball pitcher (born 1962)

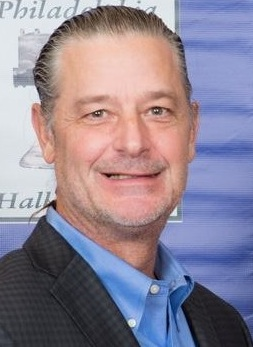
- Moyer in 2018
- Pitcher
- Born: November 18, 1962 (age 64); Sellersville, Pennsylvania, U.S.
- Batted: Left Threw: Left

MLB debut
- June 16, 1986, for the Chicago Cubs

Last MLB appearance
- May 27, 2012, for the Colorado Rockies

MLB statistics
- Win–loss record: 269–209
- Earned run average: 4.25
- Strikeouts: 2,441
- Stats at Baseball Reference

Teams
- Chicago Cubs (1986–1988); Texas Rangers (1989–1990); St. Louis Cardinals (1991); Baltimore Orioles (1993–1995); Boston Red Sox (1996); Seattle Mariners (1996–2006); Philadelphia Phillies (2006–2010); Colorado Rockies (2012)

Career highlights and awards
- All-Star (2003); World Series champion (2008); Roberto Clemente Award (2003); Seattle Mariners Hall of Fame

Jamie Moyer (born November 18, 1962) is an American former professional baseball pitcher. Over his 25-year career in Major League Baseball (MLB), Moyer pitched for the Chicago Cubs, Texas Rangers, St. Louis Cardinals, Baltimore Orioles, Boston Red Sox, Seattle Mariners, Philadelphia Phillies, and Colorado Rockies.

At the time of his final game, he was the oldest player in the major leagues and had the most wins, losses, and strikeouts of any active MLB pitcher. He was likened to Phil Niekro due to his long career and relatively old age upon retirement. On April 17, 2012, Moyer became the oldest pitcher in MLB history to win a game. On May 16, 2012, he broke his own winning-pitcher record and also set the record for the oldest MLB player to record a run batted in (RBI). He also holds the major league record for most home runs allowed with 522.

Moyer made the All-Star team in 2003, while with the Mariners. Moyer has received numerous awards for philanthropy and community service, including the 2003 Roberto Clemente Award, the 2003 Lou Gehrig Memorial Award, the 2003 Hutch Award, and the 2004 Branch Rickey Award. Moyer is one of 31 players in baseball history to date to have appeared in MLB games in four decades. At the time of his retirement, Moyer had faced 8.9% of all MLB hitters ever. He was inducted into the Mariners Hall of Fame in 2015.

== Amateur career ==
Moyer attended Souderton Area High School in Souderton, Pennsylvania, where he played baseball, basketball, and golf. In his junior year of baseball, he had a 10–0 win–loss record and threw three consecutive no-hitters.

Moyer enrolled at Saint Joseph's University and played college baseball for the Saint Joseph's Hawks baseball team. In 1984, he set the school's single-season records in wins, with 16, earned run average (ERA), with 1.99, and strikeouts, with 90. In 1997, he was one of three inductees into the first class of the Saint Joseph's Baseball Hall of Fame. In 2018, he became the only Saint Joseph's baseball player to have his jersey number, number 10, retired.

== Professional career ==
=== Chicago Cubs (1986–1988) ===
The Chicago Cubs selected Moyer in the sixth round of the 1984 amateur draft. Moyer was selected a New York–Penn League All-Star in 1984. He made his major league debut with the Cubs on June 16, 1986, against Steve Carlton and the Philadelphia Phillies, and earned his first win. On August 16, he threw his first shutout against the Montreal Expos. He was also the starting pitcher for the Cubs on the day that Greg Maddux made his major league debut.

In 1987, Moyer ranked tenth in the National League in strikeouts with 147, while winning 12 games and losing 15. He also lost 15 games in 1988 against only nine wins. Despite his poor record, Moyer lowered his ERA to 3.48 (it had been 5.10 in 1987), and while he struck out fewer batters than he had in the previous year, he decreased his walk rate significantly, giving only 55 batters a base on balls as opposed to 97 in the previous year.

=== Texas Rangers (1989–1990) ===
Following his then-best season in 1988, the Cubs traded Moyer, Rafael Palmeiro, and Drew Hall to the Texas Rangers for Mitch Williams, Paul Kilgus, Curtis Wilkerson, Steve Wilson, Luis Benitez, and Pablo Delgado.

Moyer was on the disabled list with a sore left shoulder for much of a disappointing 1989 season. In 1990, Moyer spent time in the bullpen before regaining a spot in the starting rotation.

=== St. Louis Cardinals (1991) ===
Moyer was released as a free agent after the 1990 season and was signed by the St. Louis Cardinals. He made seven starts for the Cardinals in 1991 before being sent to the minor leagues on May 24. He was released on October 14.

=== Chicago Cubs/Detroit Tigers (1992) ===
In 1992, Moyer attended spring training with the Chicago Cubs, but was released and spent the rest of the season in the minor league system of the Detroit Tigers.

=== Baltimore Orioles (1993–1995) ===
On December 18, 1992, Moyer signed with the Baltimore Orioles.

Moyer began the 1993 season in the Oriole minor leagues before being called up on May 30. He tied his career-high total in wins with 12 and set a new career-low ERA of 3.43. The strike-shortened 1994 season saw his ERA rise to 4.77, but he was third on the Orioles' staff in innings pitched. In 1995, Moyer again found himself in the Baltimore bullpen, but worked his way back into the starting rotation.

=== Boston Red Sox (1996) ===
Moyer was signed by the Boston Red Sox on January 2, 1996. Moyer appeared in 23 games for Boston, making 10 starts.

=== Seattle Mariners (1996–2006) ===
==== 1996–1999 ====
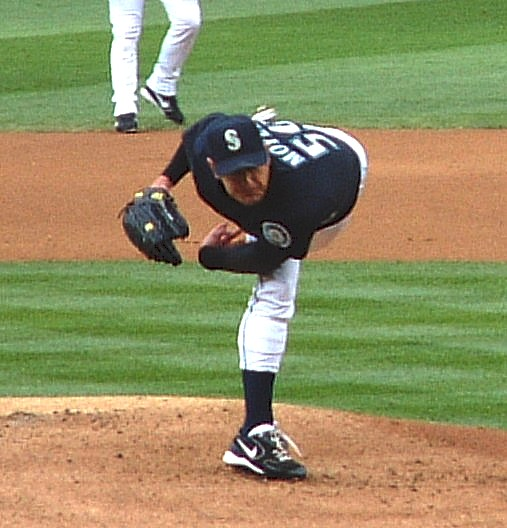
Moyer in 2005

In the middle of the 1996 season, Moyer was traded by the Red Sox to the Seattle Mariners on July 30, for outfielder Darren Bragg. In Seattle, he started 11 games and went 6–2. Moyer's record of 13–3 across both teams led the majors in winning percentage at .813.

In 1997, Moyer was fifth in the American League with 17 wins. His 17–5 record gave him the second-highest winning percentage (.773) in the league. In the Division Series, Moyer made his first postseason start against his former club Baltimore, but was forced out with a strained elbow in the fifth inning. Moyer took the loss in Game 2 and the Orioles won the series in four games.

In 1998, Moyer went 15–9 with a 3.53 ERA. He accumulated 158 strikeouts, the highest total of his career. Moyer was fourth in the American League in innings pitched with 234.1. He registered his 100th career win against the Cleveland Indians on August 27, as well as his 1000th career strikeout with a sixth inning strikeout of David Bell. Moyer was named Seattle's Pitcher of the Year by the Seattle chapter of the BBWAA.

Moyer walked two or fewer batters in 29 of his 32 starts. He ranked third in the American League with 1.6 walks per nine innings, and his ERA was the seventh-best in the league. Moyer's three shutouts were tied for fourth in the majors, and he was fifth in the American League in wins above replacement (WAR) for pitchers, per Baseball Reference.

In 1999, Moyer went 14–8 with a 3.87 ERA and was voted to The Sporting News AL All-Star team. He again won the Seattle Pitcher of the Year award.

Moyer matched his career-best seven-game winning streak from May 11 to July 7. He started the Inaugural Game at Safeco Field on July 15 against the San Diego Padres, throwing a called strike to San Diego's Quilvio Veras for the first pitch and getting a no-decision in Seattle's 3–2 loss after leaving with a 2–1 lead after eight innings. Moyer defeated Baltimore for the ninth straight time on July 31; he did not lose to the Orioles in the 1990s. Moyer's only loss at Safeco came on August 5 against the New York Yankees. He recorded three complete games in the final month of the season, tossing back-to-back complete games on September 14 and 19. His 2.30 ERA after the All-Star break was the second-lowest among AL starters, behind only Pedro Martínez with his 2.01 ERA. Moyer pitched four complete games for the second straight season, tying his career best. Moyer accumulated 6.5 wins above replacement, third among American League pitchers. He was also sixth in the league in ERA and third in innings pitched.

==== 2000–2001 ====
In 2000, Moyer rebounded from an early shoulder injury to tally 13 wins, giving him at least 13 in each of his past five seasons. He made his first Opening Day start for Seattle, but lost to the Boston Red Sox 2–0 on April 4. His shoulder problems led his ERA to balloon to 5.49.

Moyer lost five consecutive starts from August 4–24. He allowed a career-high and a club-record 11 earned runs in a 19–3 loss on August 9 against the Chicago White Sox. He allowed 11 runs (six earned) in a 14–4 loss on August 14 against the Detroit Tigers, joining the Houston Astros' José Lima as the first two pitchers since 1950 to allow 10 or more runs in consecutive starts. Moyer allowed a career-high seven walks in a no-decision on August 29 against the Yankees. The Mariners' 7–2 win on September 9 against the Minnesota Twins snapped a six-game losing streak. Moyer lasted just one and two-thirds innings in his final start, getting a no-decision on September 28 against the Texas Rangers. Moyer suffered a hairline fracture of the left kneecap while pitching a simulated game on October 7. Moyer finished the 2000 season with a 13–10 record and a 5.49 ERA. That knee injury suffered on the last pitch of a simulated game caused him to miss Seattle's trip to the American League Championship Series against the eventual World Series champion New York Yankees.

Moyer bounced back in the Mariners' 116-win 2001 season. He earned 20 wins, ranked tied for second in the American League, and his 3.43 ERA was sixth in the AL. He earned his 150th career win, against the Texas Rangers on September 24. He became only the second Mariner in history to win 20 games on October 5, with former teammate Randy Johnson being the other. Moyer went 3–0 with a 1.89 ERA in the postseason. He won Games 2 and 5 for the Mariners against the Cleveland Indians in the ALDS. Moyer also won Game 3 against the New York Yankees in the ALCS. However, this would be Seattle's only victory in the series, as New York defeated them in five games to advance to their fourth consecutive World Series.

==== 2002–2003 ====
In 2002, Moyer went 13–8 with a then career low 3.32 ERA. Although he pitched 20 more innings and had a lower ERA than in 2001, he won seven fewer games.

Moyer was fourth in the AL in innings with 230.2. He was tied for second in the league with 34 starts, fifth in opponents' batting average, holding opposing hitters to a .230 clip, and ninth in ERA with 3.32. He tossed a team-high 24 consecutive scoreless innings from June 16 to July 6. He averaged just two walks per nine innings pitched, tied for sixth-best in the AL. The Mariners were 20–14 in his starts. His four complete games tied his career high set in 1998 and 1999. He threw the seventh complete game shutout of his career, and his first of the season, on June 10 against the St. Louis Cardinals in a 10–0 win. Moyer's start on June 16 against San Diego began a streak of 24 consecutive shutout innings over four starts. He finished June 3–1 with a Major League best 1.01 ERA in five starts. In four of those starts, Moyer pitched at least seven innings without allowing a run. He collected his 1,500th career strikeout August 24 against the Cleveland Indians.

In 2003, Moyer won a career high 21 games, lost 7, and had a career low 3.27 ERA. He tied for second in the American League for wins and was sixth in ERA. His .750 winning percentage placed him fourth in the league and his 21 wins are a club record. He became the only Seattle pitcher to win 20 games more than once. Moyer was voted to his first and only All-Star Game in 2003. He was named the Seattle Pitcher of the Year for the third time and was also the recipient of the Roberto Clemente Award, given annually to a player whose success on the field is mirrored by his impact in community service. Moyer also won the Hutch Award, presented annually by the Fred Hutchinson Cancer Research Center to an MLB player displaying "honor, courage and dedication to baseball, both on and off the field" and The Lou Gehrig Award, presented annually to the MLB player who both on and off the field best exemplifies the character of Lou Gehrig.

==== 2004–2006 ====
In 2004, Moyer went 7–13 and posted his first losing record since 1994. His ERA was 5.21 and he surrendered an MLB-leading 44 home runs. While the year started well for him, going 5–0 with a 1.59 ERA from May 20 to June 18, Moyer ended 2004 on a 10-game losing streak. He threw the slowest fastball of all AL starters, averaging 81.6 mph. He was awarded the Branch Rickey Award for his exceptional community service following the season.

During the 2005 season, Moyer passed Randy Johnson to become the winningest pitcher for the Mariners on May 30. On July 8, Moyer became the 25th southpaw to win 200 games in Major League Baseball. He finished with a 13–7 record, and for the second year in a row he threw the slowest fastball of all major league starters, averaging 81.7 mph.

On June 18, 2006, he became the 33rd man to start 500 major league games. In his 11 seasons with the Mariners, Moyer had a record of 145–87 with a 3.97 ERA in 324 games (323 starts). He is the franchise leader in starts and innings pitched. He held the franchise record for wins until Félix Hernández earned his 146th Mariner win on May 9, 2016.

Moyer is also one of the all-time leaders in 1–0 complete game losses. Moyer has lost eight games having surrendered only one run over nine innings. Before being traded in August 2006, he was the oldest active American League player.

=== Philadelphia Phillies (2006–2010) ===
==== 2006–2007 ====
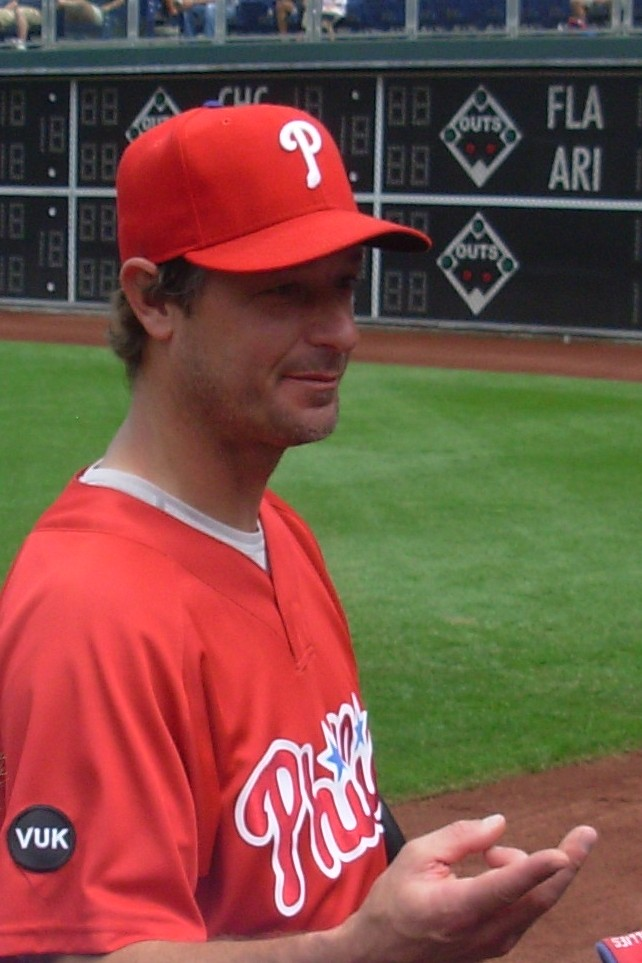
Moyer with the Phillies in 2007

On August 19, 2006, Moyer was traded to the Philadelphia Phillies for minor league pitchers Andrew Barb and Andrew Baldwin. In his first start with the Phillies, Moyer set a franchise record as the oldest pitcher to record a win. In eight starts with the Phillies in 2006, Moyer went 5–2 with a 4.03 ERA. After the season, Moyer signed a two-year extension worth $10.5 million with the Phillies on October 23.

On April 12, 2007, at age 44 Moyer struck out his 2000th batter against the Mets. On April 29, Moyer pitched a two-hitter through 7 1/3 innings as he recorded a win against the Florida Marlins. On July 21, at age 44, Moyer combined with David Wells to set the record for the oldest match up of lefty starters (88 years, 307 days) in major league history. Moyer won the game and Wells lost; the oldest over the youngest by 183 days.

On the final day of the season, with the Phillies and Mets tied at the top of the division with 88 wins, Moyer defeated the Washington Nationals, pitching 5 1/3 innings and surrendering five hits and no earned runs, while Tom Glavine, who at the time was also one of the oldest players in the major leagues, was crushed by the Marlins at Shea Stadium, surrendering seven runs in the first inning, hitting a batter with the bases loaded, and recording only a single out before being pulled. The Phillies would win the division by a single game, but would not win a single playoff game, falling to the Rockies in the division series.

He threw the slowest fastball of all NL starters in 2007, averaging 81.1 miles per hour (130.5 km/h).

==== 2008 ====
In 2008, at age 45, Moyer became the oldest active player in Major League baseball. On April 30, Moyer hit a single off Padres pitcher Chris Young into left center field to become the oldest Phillie ever to get a hit.

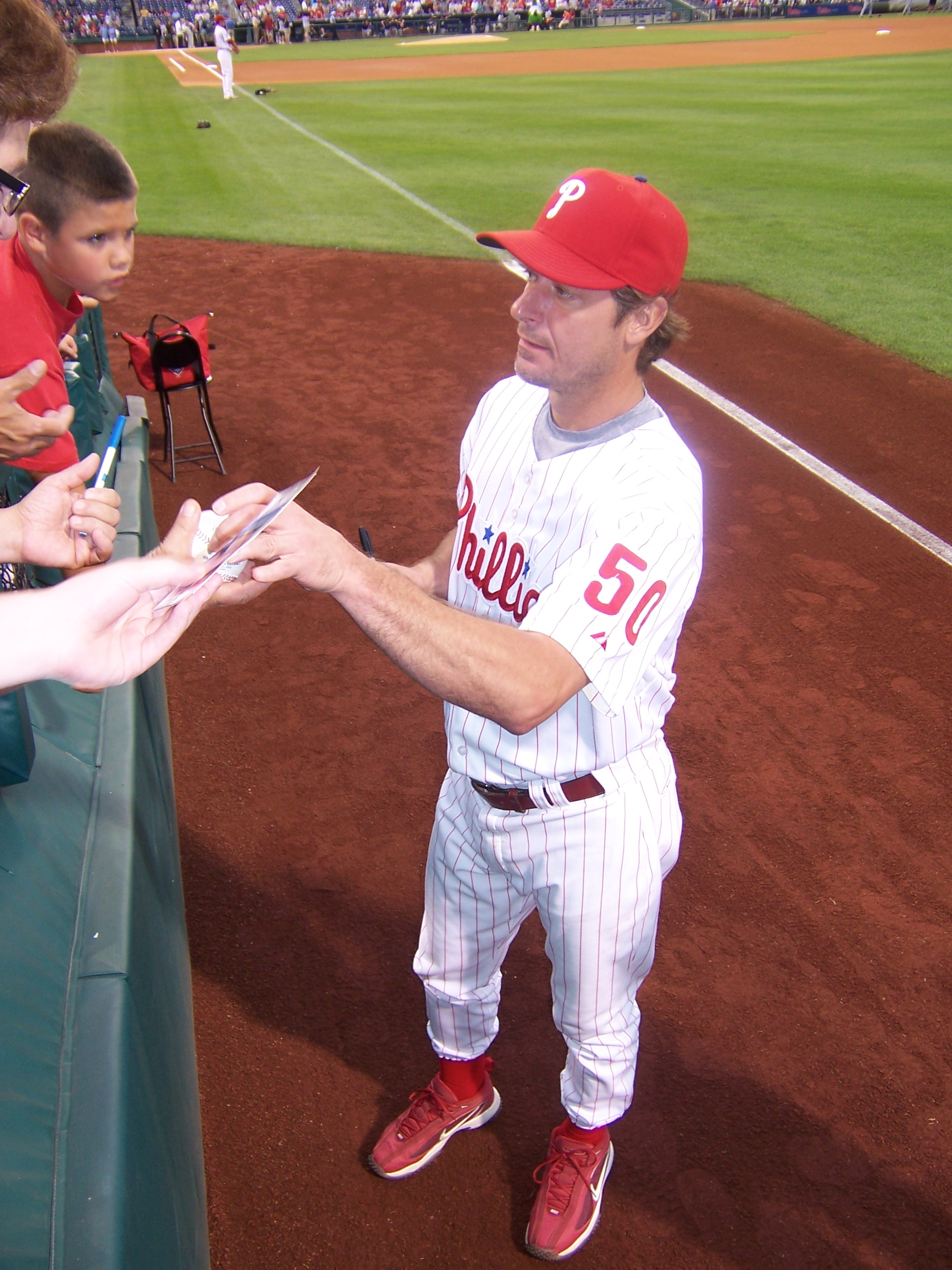
Moyer with the Phillies in 2008

On April 30, 2008, at age 45, Moyer became the oldest player to ever have a bobblehead giveaway.

On May 26, Moyer won his 235th career game, giving him at least one victory over each Major League team. The victory came in a 20–5 win over the Rockies. Moyer pitched seven innings, struck out seven batters, and gave up four runs. He followed that in his next start against the Marlins by earning his sixth victory of the season, pitching seven innings and giving up five runs.

On September 11, Moyer won his 14th game of the season against the Milwaukee Brewers, which began a seven-game win streak for the Phillies. On September 27, Moyer took the mound for the Phillies against the Nationals, in a game where the Phillies could clinch the National League East title with a win. Moyer pitched six innings and gave up only one run. The Phillies won the game 4–3. Moyer earned his 16th win of the year, the second-oldest pitcher to accomplish this feat, finishing with a 3.71 ERA. He also threw the slowest fastball of all NL starters in 2008, averaging 81.2 miles per hour. He threw cutters 29.5% of the time, the highest rate in the NL.

When he took the mound on October 4 against the Milwaukee Brewers in the 2008 National League Division Series, Moyer became the second-oldest pitcher to ever start a postseason game (doing so at the age of 45 years and 321 days), and the oldest since 1929 when Jack Quinn started for the Philadelphia Athletics (46 years, 103 days).

On October 12, Moyer became the oldest pitcher (45 years, 329 days) to pitch in a National League Championship Series game, starting in Game 3 against the Los Angeles Dodgers. However, he struggled during the game and surrendered six runs in 1 1/3 innings—his shortest start in over eight years—and went on to lose the game.

The World Series matched the Phillies against the Tampa Bay Rays, and Moyer was tapped to start Game 3 on October 25. In his first (and as it turned out, only) career World Series start, he pitched 6 1/3 innings, gave up three runs, and received a no-decision. His performance was made more impressive due to the fact that he pitched with a severe stomach virus. He won his first World Series ring when the Phillies defeated the Rays on October 29 in his 23rd season as a player. Following the game, the pitching rubber at Citizens Bank Park was dug up and given to Moyer by his teammates. In his speech at the World Series celebration at Citizens Bank Park on October 31, Moyer told fans that he grew up as a Phillies fan and played hooky from Souderton Area High School to attend the Phillies' championship parade in 1980. On December 15, 2008, Moyer signed a two-year, $16 million contract with the Phillies, keeping him with the club through the conclusion of the 2010 season.

==== 2009 ====
Moyer started the season with a 3–5 record and a 7.42 ERA, but earned his 250th career win on May 31 against the Washington Nationals in a 4–2 win, becoming the 44th pitcher and the 11th lefty to do this. By the All-Star break, Moyer had improved his record to 8–6 and had lowered his ERA to 5.99. On July 16, Moyer won his 255th career game, pitching a one-hitter through seven scoreless innings and passing Jack Morris for 41st on the all-time wins list. Despite leading the rotation with 10 wins, Moyer carried a still inflated 5.47 ERA. This prompted the Phillies to move him to the bullpen to make room in their rotation for Pedro Martínez. Regarding the move, manager Charlie Manuel said,

Jamie was a total professional and team player when we let him know of the decision to move him to the bullpen. He has been, and will continue to be, a very important part of this team.

In Moyer's bullpen debut on August 18, he relieved Martínez in the fourth inning after a rain delay, pitching six scoreless innings to earn his 11th win of the season. A similar situation occurred on August 28, as Moyer again relieved Martínez in the third inning after a rain delay. He pitched 4 1/3 in relief, giving up one earned run, and picked up his 12th win of the season.

Moyer tore three muscles in his groin and lower abdomen while pitching against the Houston Astros on September 29. He missed the rest of the regular season and was not on the Phillies' postseason roster.

==== 2010 ====
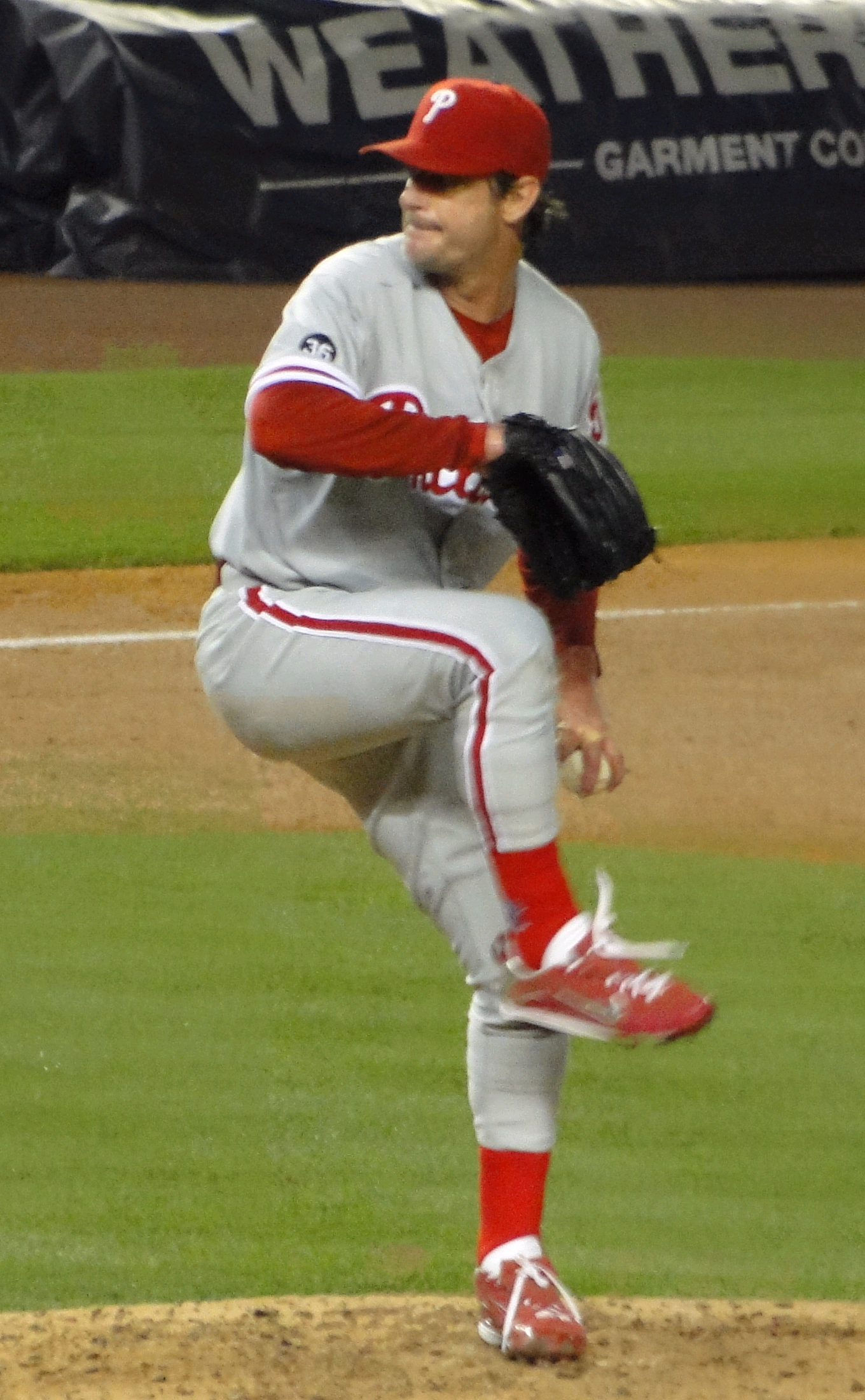
Moyer pitched with the Phillies for five seasons

When asked about retiring after the expiration of his Phillies contract at the end of 2010, Moyer said, "You know, I'm going to leave that as an open-ended question because I don't know how to answer that. It could be (my last season). It potentially could be. But so could have last year. So could have two years ago, so could have five years ago."

After the retirement of Ken Griffey Jr. in early 2010, Moyer and Omar Vizquel were the last two active players in MLB who played in the 1980s. On April 10, at age 47, Moyer became the sixth-oldest pitcher to appear in a game and the eighth major league pitcher to start a game in four different decades. Moyer pitched six innings and earned his 259th career victory. On May 7, Moyer became the oldest player in Major League Baseball history (47 years, 170 days) to pitch a shutout, blanking the Braves on two hits, striking out five batters and walking none. Moyer also became the only MLB pitcher to throw a shutout in four different decades (1980s, 1990s, 2000s, and 2010s).

On June 5, Moyer became the third MLB pitcher to win 100 games after turning 40 years old, defeating the San Diego Padres, 6–2, using just 98 pitches to accomplish the feat. It was also his second complete game of the season. On June 16, Moyer became the oldest pitcher to ever defeat the New York Yankees. Moyer beat the Yankees at 47 years, 210 days. On June 27, he surrendered a home run to Vernon Wells of the Toronto Blue Jays to become the all-time major league leader in home runs allowed (506), passing Robin Roberts, (who died only a month and a half before Moyer broke the record). On July 20, Moyer left a start against the St. Louis Cardinals due to an elbow strain after pitching only one inning. The injury proved to be a sprain in his ulnar collateral ligament and a strain of his flexor pronator, which resulted in Moyer missing the remainder of the 2010 season.

After the 2010 season, Moyer's contract expired and he was removed from the Phillies' 40-man roster. He pitched in the Dominican Winter Leagues before suffering another elbow injury on November 6, 2010, which ended his chance of playing in 2011. He had Tommy John surgery on December 1, 2010, in New York, to repair the ulnar collateral ligament in his elbow, in hopes to make a comeback in 2012. Moyer worked for ESPN during his recovery.

=== Colorado Rockies (2012) ===
On January 18, 2012, Moyer, age 49, signed a minor-league contract (with an invitation to spring training) with the Colorado Rockies, a team that did not exist when he made his MLB debut in 1986. The March 30 NBC Nightly News reported that Moyer made the opening day roster for the Rockies, and would be the number-two starter in the rotation. The report was confirmed the following day by the Associated Press. He made his Rockies debut on April 7 against the Houston Astros. He pitched five innings, giving up three runs, and received the loss.

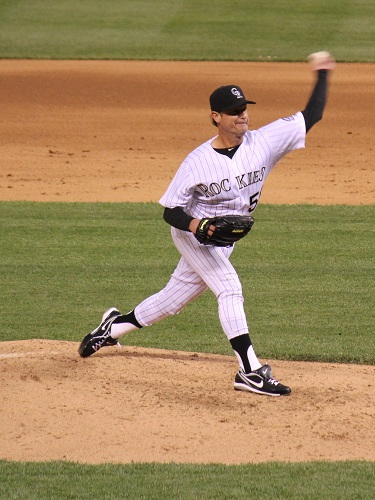
Moyer pitching for the Colorado Rockies in 2012

On April 17, Jamie Moyer became the oldest pitcher in MLB history to earn a win. The previous record was held by Jack Quinn, who earned his last win in 1932, two months after his 49th birthday. Moyer became the oldest player in MLB history to record an RBI on May 16 when he singled in two runs in the fourth inning against the Arizona Diamondbacks. He also extended his record for the oldest pitcher to record a win. Five days later, Moyer started for the Rockies against the Marlins at Marlins Park. This appearance represented the 50th MLB stadium Moyer had pitched in, the most of any pitcher to debut since 1900.

On June 4, the Rockies released Moyer, making him a free agent and eligible to sign with any team. He was 2–5 in 10 starts for the Rockies.

=== Second stint with the Baltimore Orioles organization (2012) ===
Moyer signed a minor league deal with the Baltimore Orioles on June 6, two days after being released by the Rockies. The deal came with the stipulation that he would make three starts with the Triple-A Norfolk Tides, and after that the Orioles had to promote him or grant his release. Following his third start on June 23, the Orioles offered Moyer another start with the Tides. He instead opted to become a free agent. With the Tides, Moyer went 1–1 with a 1.69 ERA with 16 strikeouts in 16 innings over three games. He also demonstrated exceptional control as he did not walk a batter and allowed only 11 hits. The Orioles liked what they saw, but the timing just wasn't right to add him to the rotation. "We're very appreciative of him giving us that opportunity to look," Baltimore manager Buck Showalter said. "I wouldn't be surprised to see him pitch for somebody shortly. Personally, just out of respect for his career what he's done, I hope it happens."

=== Toronto Blue Jays organization (2012) ===
Moyer signed a minor league contract with the Toronto Blue Jays after being released by the Orioles. Moyer made his first start for the Blue Jays Triple-A team, the Las Vegas 51s, on June 28. Moyer got the win, pitching five innings and giving up three runs on seven hits, with six strikeouts and one walk. Moyer's second start was a loss to the Reno Aces, in which he yielded seven runs on 10 hits through six innings. In his planned two starts with Las Vegas, Moyer posted a 1–1 record with an 8.18 ERA through 11 innings. Moyer did not travel back to Las Vegas at the end of the second game. On July 5, he was released by Toronto.

=== 2013 and retirement ===
On September 7, it was reported that Moyer was attempting a comeback as a knuckleball pitcher, having consulted with Charlie Hough and Tim Wakefield over the summer.

Moyer announced the end of his baseball-playing career during an interview with Dave Davies on National Public Radio's Fresh Air broadcast that aired October 2, 2013. During the interview on Fresh Air he also announced his intention to start a pitching academy, The Moyer Pitching Academy, as well as continue his charitable work with The Moyer Foundation, but that he would be open to an offer to coach in the major leagues.

Moyer has written a memoir, with Larry Platt, entitled Just Tell Me I Can't: How Jamie Moyer Defied the Radar Gun and Defeated Time and published in 2013. Moyer dedicated the book, and also sees the academy as a tribute, to the memory of the late counselor and author Harvey Dorfman, who helped shape Moyer's "mental game".

In 2018, Moyer appeared on the BBWAA Hall of Fame ballot for the first time. He received 10 votes and failed to meet the 5% threshold to remain on the ballot in the future.

=== Broadcasting career ===
On February 11, 2014, it was announced that Moyer and fellow former Phillie Matt Stairs would join the Phillies' television broadcast crew as color analysts for the 2014 season. Moyer and Stairs joined in-game reporter Gregg Murphy and play-by-play voice Tom McCarthy. Following the season, Moyer announced he would not return to the booth in 2015, citing a desire to spend more time with his family.

== Pitching style ==
As Moyer aged, his pitching approach evolved. Most pitchers lose velocity later in their career, and Moyer was no exception—his average fastball speed in 2012 was about 80 MPH, a very slow speed for a non-knuckleball pitcher. Instead of velocity, Moyer relied on control and mixing his pitches. He threw five main pitches: a sinker, a cut fastball, a slider, a changeup, and a curveball.

== Personal life ==
In 1996, Moyer earned a Bachelor of General Studies degree from Indiana University.

Moyer was married to Karen Phelps, the daughter of former Notre Dame basketball coach Digger Phelps. The two were introduced by Harry Caray when Moyer was with the Cubs and Karen was an intern with Cubs broadcast outlet, WGN. They were married in a Catholic ceremony and have eight children. Moyer and Karen divorced in 2017.

Moyer's oldest son Dillon was drafted in the 22nd round of the 2010 MLB draft by the Minnesota Twins but did not sign and instead attended UC Irvine for two years. He transferred to UC San Diego for his junior and final year, as he graduated in three years with a major in sociology and minor in education. He was drafted in the 38th round of the 2013 MLB draft by the Los Angeles Dodgers and signed with them. Another son, Hutton, was drafted in the seventh round of the 2015 MLB draft.

In 2000, Moyer and Karen Phelps Moyer founded Eluna, an organization with a mission to help children in distress.

== See also ==
- Home runs allowed
- List of Major League Baseball career wins leaders
- List of Major League Baseball players who played in four decades
- List of oldest Major League Baseball players
- List of Major League Baseball career hit batsmen leaders
- List of Major League Baseball career strikeout leaders

Awards and achievements
| Preceded by Jeff Fassero; Freddy García | Opening Day starting pitcher for the Seattle Mariners; 2000; 2004–2006 | Succeeded by Freddy García; Félix Hernández |
| Preceded by Julio Franco; Matt Stairs | Oldest Player in the National League; 2008–2010; 2012 | Succeeded by Matt Stairs; José Contreras |
