= Brent Spence Bridge =

U.S. bridge between Kentucky and Ohio

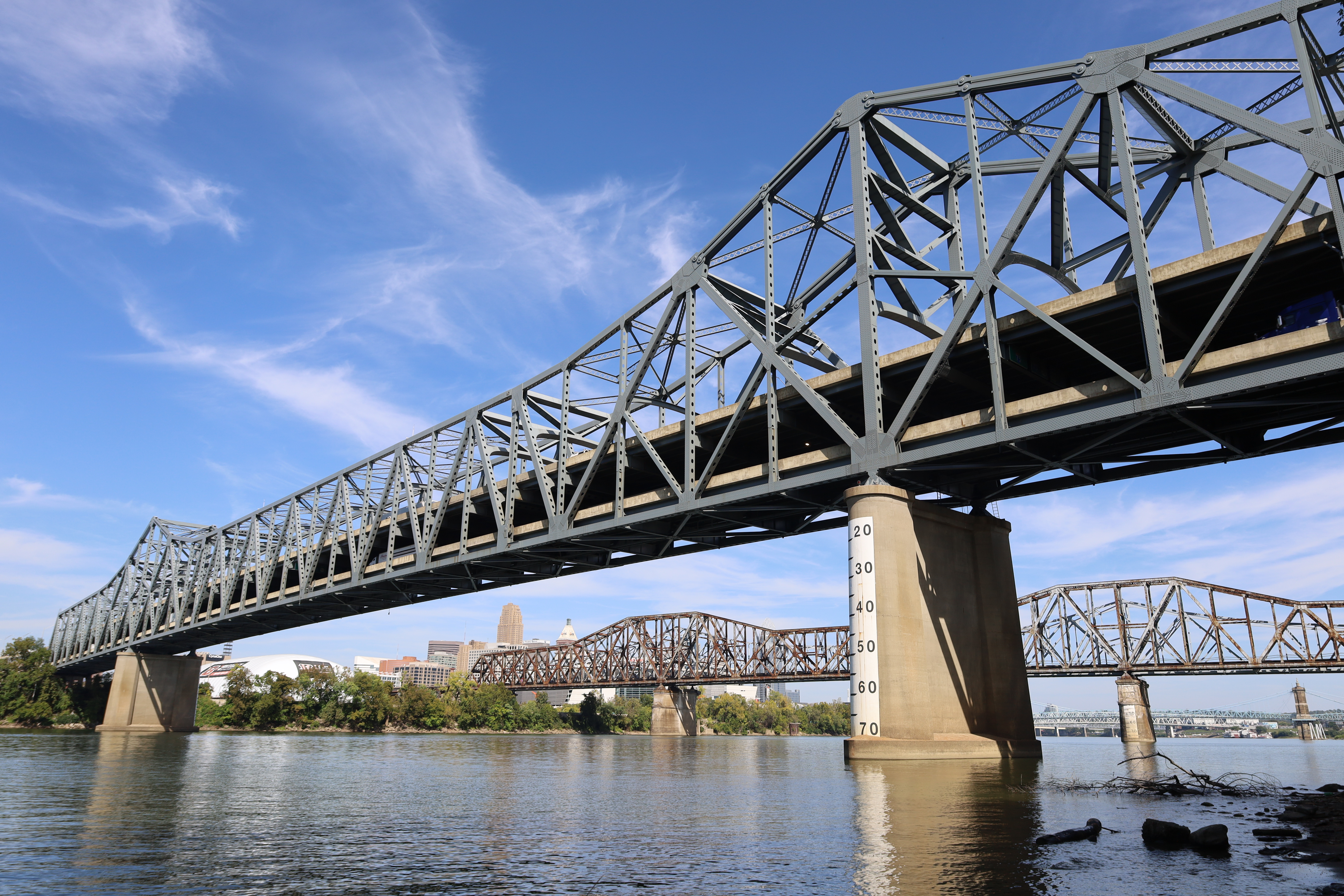
- The Brent Spence Bridge viewed from Covington, Kentucky in 2025
- Coordinates: 39.09087°N 84.52291°W
- Carries: 8 lanes (4 upper, 4 lower) of I-71 / I-75
- Crosses: Ohio River
- Locale: Covington, Kentucky and Cincinnati, Ohio
- Maintained by: Kentucky Transportation Cabinet

Characteristics
- Design: Cantilever bridge
- Total length: 1,736 feet (529 m)
- Longest span: 830.5 feet (253.1 m)

History
- Construction cost: $10 million (equivalent to $78 million in 2024 dollars)
- Opened: November 25, 1963; 62 years ago

Location
- Interactive map of Brent Spence Bridge

The Brent Spence Bridge is a double decker, cantilevered truss bridge that carries Interstates 71 and 75 across the Ohio River between Covington, Kentucky and Cincinnati, Ohio. The top deck carries Kentucky-bound (southbound) traffic while the bottom deck carries Ohio-bound (northbound) traffic.

== Current bridge ==
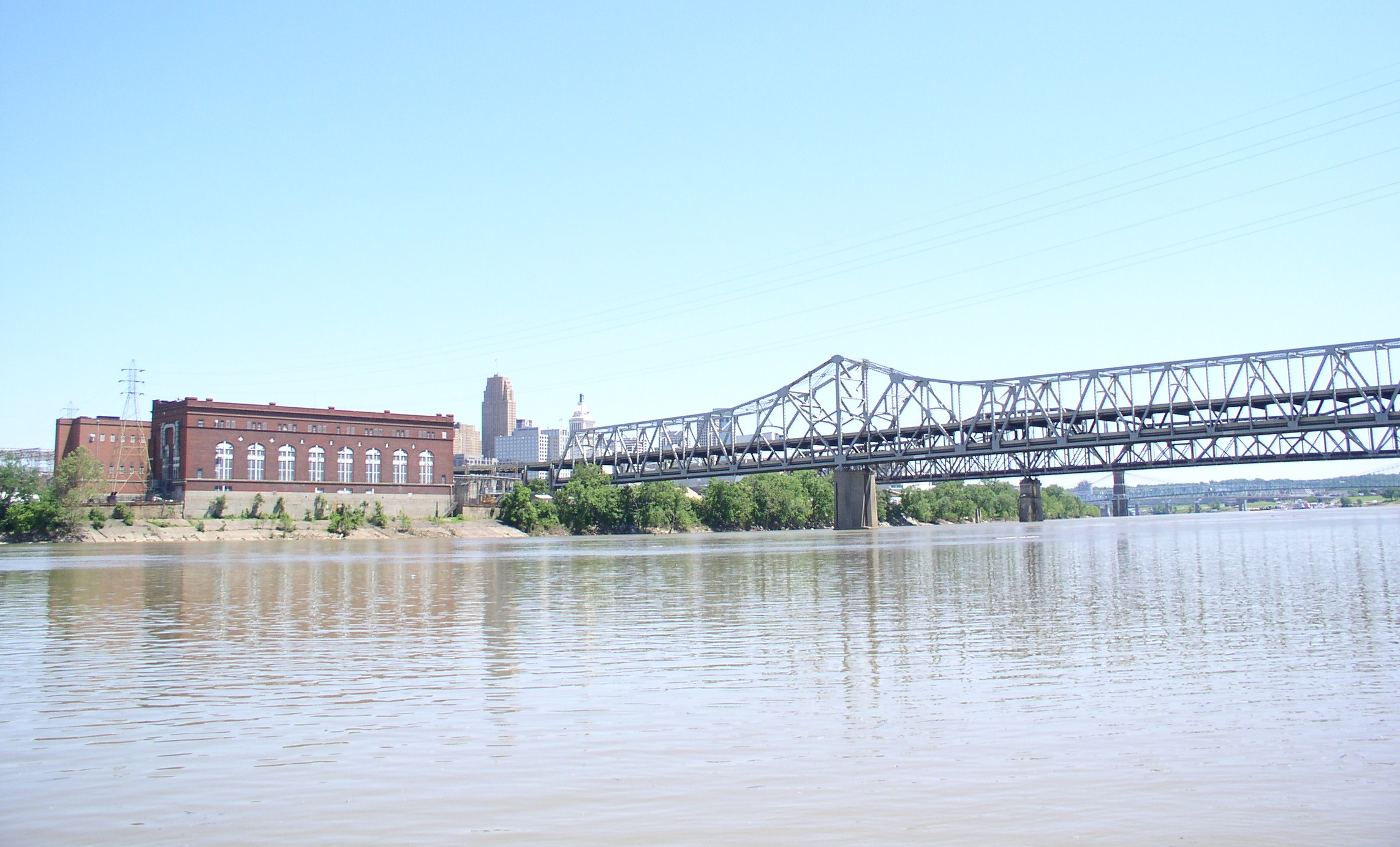
View of the bridge in 2009

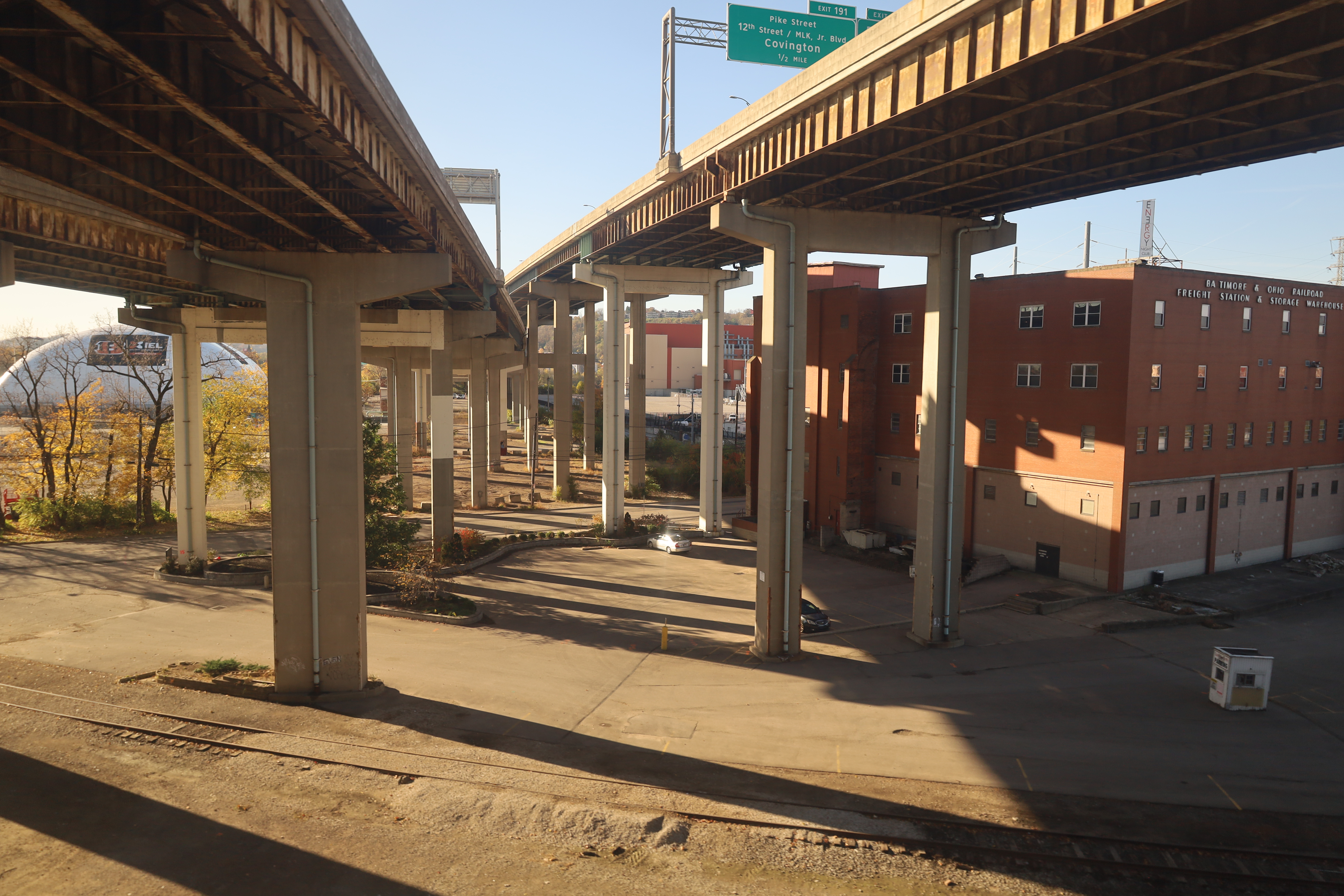
Northern approaches to the bridge as the freeway transitions to a bi-level configuration in 2025

The bridge was named for Kentucky's longest serving congressman at the time, Brent Spence, who served in the U.S. Congress for over thirty years before retiring in January 1963. The bridge, which opened a year after his retirement, was named in his honor by then Kentucky governor Bert T. Combs. Spence did not feel that he deserved the honor, and lobbied for the Bridge to be named for President Kennedy (who had been assassinated only three days before the bridge was supposed to open). Combs, however, resisted this effort at modesty by Spence and kept the name, though Combs would name the John F. Kennedy Memorial Bridge in Louisville, Kentucky (which opened two weeks after the Spence) after the late president just days after Kennedy's assassination.

When the bridge opened in November 1963, it carried only three lanes of traffic each way across the Ohio River. In 1985, the emergency shoulders were eliminated, and the bridge was re-striped with four lanes in each direction, increasing the traffic capacity by 33%, earning the bridge the determination of being 'functionally obsolete' due to carrying more traffic than it was originally designed to carry. The bridge was designed to carry 85,000 vehicles per day, but in 2006 it carried 150,000 vehicles per day. Recent reports show that contrary to previous traffic expectations, traffic on the Brent Spence Bridge has actually decreased by 9 percent between 2009 and 2015.

On September 15, 2014, chunks of concrete from the Ohio side ramp connected to the bridge fell onto a vehicle. This incident prompted fears that the bridge might be in danger of collapse, but the Kentucky Transportation Cabinet later declared the bridge safe.

In the early morning hours of November 11, 2020, a fiery accident involving two semi-trucks, one of which was carrying caustic chemicals, caused the bridge to be closed to traffic. Following the accident, the Brent Spence Bridge was closed for safety inspections. Traffic on Interstates 71 and 75 that normally used the bridge to cross the Ohio River was rerouted to other auxiliary interstates. The U.S. Coast Guard also temporarily closed the Ohio River to all traffic while the bridge inspections were underway. On November 16, Kentucky Governor Andy Beshear announced that the accident and subsequent fire did not compromise the integrity of the bridge. Kentucky Transportation Secretary Jim Gray stated that the damage was confined to a 200 ft (61 m) section of the bridge. The bridge reopened on December 22, one day ahead of schedule.

== Planned companion bridge ==
In 2008, the Cincinnati City Council supported a plan called Alternative #4, which involved building a new bridge to carry I-75 at the current location and demolishing the Brent Spence Bridge. Alternative #4 entailed building a parallel bridge just west of the Brent Spence Bridge. It would again be a two-deck bridge, except the top deck would carry all I-75 traffic and the bottom deck would carry south I-71 and local traffic. The I-75 deck would have a total of 6 lanes, with 3 lanes each for north and south traffic. The I-71 deck would be a total of 5 lanes, divided into 3 lanes for south local traffic, and 2 lanes of south 71 traffic. Additionally, Cincinnati City Council expressed interest in using the bridge for a light rail system that would connect downtown Cincinnati to the Cincinnati/Northern Kentucky International Airport.

In 2012, a new plan known as Alternative I was designated as the "Selected Alternative". The plan still entailed building a new double deck bridge just west of the existing Brent Spence Bridge, this time with three lanes each way for I-75, two lanes for southbound I-71, and three lanes for southbound local traffic. The major change under Alternative I was that the existing Brent Spence Bridge was to be rehabilitated to carry two lanes for northbound I-71 and three lanes for northbound local traffic.

In 2021, an upgrade or replacement of the Brent Spence Bridge was prioritized in the American Jobs Plan, which was later reworked into the Infrastructure Investment and Jobs Act signed into law by President Joe Biden on November 15, 2021. With potential funding thus in place, refining the plan in conversation with local stakeholders progressed more rapidly. By late spring 2022, while the bridge design and location of Alternative I was largely maintained, the traffic design plan had been replaced by three updated concepts, known as M, W, and S, with Concept W, an alternative developed in 2015 which would separate local and through traffic by placing all I-71 and I-75 traffic on the new bridge and limit traffic on the existing bridge to local traffic only, emerging as the favored option. Concept W also calls for returning the existing Brent Spence Bridge to the original design of three lanes in each direction, with the original wider shoulders. It was this plan that Kentucky and Ohio moved forward with in their application for federal funding.

=== Approved and funded plan ===
On December 29, 2022, the Biden administration signed a federal funding package of $1.6 billion to help repair the bridge. The plan calls for reconfiguring the existing bridge for local traffic only. The plan includes building a new, yet to be named, companion bridge to be used as an express path for highway traffic through the downtown Cincinnati and Covington corridor. Construction on the bridge is to begin in 2025 and is expected to take eight years to complete. According to this timeline, the new bridge and reconfigured Brent Spence Bridge will open for traffic in 2032. In May 2024, the Federal Highway Administration approved the environmental assessment submitted by the Kentucky Transportation Cabinet and the Ohio Department of Transportation, allowing the project to proceed to the final design phase.

Because the new bridge project will require rerouting sections of I-75, in early 2024 city officials proposed minor changes to the plan to include revisions to the surface-level street grid. This would allow the Queensgate neighborhood, largely razed in the 1960s as part of slum clearance and urban renewal, to be reconnected to downtown Cincinnati. In late May 2024, this proposal, along with other minor changes, was approved.

On June 18, 2025, Ohio governor Mike DeWine and Kentucky governor Andy Beshear announced that the design of the companion bridge would be a cable-stayed bridge, with independently supported decks so that steel structures would not be necessary between them.

The Ohio government approved the project in March 2026. Adjacent Longworth Hall had already begun to be modified. Groundbreaking occurred on May 8, 2026.

== See also ==
- List of crossings of the Ohio River
- Cut-in-the-Hill
