= Alvin Davis =

American baseball player (born 1960)

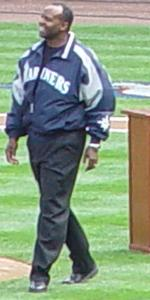
- Davis in Seattle, Opening Day 2007
- First baseman / Designated hitter
- Born: September 9, 1960 (age 66); Riverside, California, U.S.
- Batted: Left Threw: Right

Professional debut
- MLB: April 11, 1984, for the Seattle Mariners
- NPB: July 10, 1992, for the Osaka Kintetsu Buffaloes

Last appearance
- MLB: June 25, 1992, for the California Angels
- NPB: September 15, 1992, for the Osaka Kintetsu Buffaloes

MLB statistics
- Batting average: .280
- Home runs: 160
- Runs batted in: 683

NPB statistics
- Batting average: .275
- Home runs: 5
- Runs batted in: 12
- Stats at Baseball Reference

Teams
- Seattle Mariners (1984–1991); California Angels (1992); Osaka Kintetsu Buffaloes (1992)

Career highlights and awards
- All-Star (1984); AL Rookie of the Year (1984); Seattle Mariners Hall of Fame

Alvin Glenn Davis (born September 9, 1960), nicknamed "Mr. Mariner", is an American former professional baseball first baseman and designated hitter. He played eight of his nine seasons for the Seattle Mariners, winning the American League Rookie of the Year Award and being selected to the All-Star Game in 1984. He played part of the 1992 season with the California Angels, playing later that year for the Kintetsu Buffaloes of Nippon Professional Baseball. He was inducted into the Mariners Hall of Fame in 1997.

== Early years ==
The youngest of four sons, Davis was born and raised in Riverside, California. His father died in 1970. Davis graduated from John W. North High School in 1978. He was selected in the eighth round (189th overall) of the 1978 Major League Baseball (MLB) draft by the San Francisco Giants but opted to play college baseball for the Arizona State Sun Devils. Davis, who batted left-handed and threw right-handed, was later drafted by the Oakland Athletics in the sixth round (144th overall) of the 1981 MLB draft, but opted to stay in college and earned a degree in finance.

== Professional career ==
=== Seattle Mariners ===
==== Draft and minor leagues (1982–1984) ====
After his senior season at Arizona State in 1982, Davis was drafted in June by the Seattle Mariners in the sixth round (138th overall). He played the rest of the season in Double-A for the Lynn Sailors in the Eastern League, batting .284 with 12 home runs and 56 runs batted in (RBI) in 74 games. Davis continued at that level in 1983 in Tennessee, with the Chattanooga Lookouts in the Southern League. He hit .296 with 18 home runs and 83 RBI in 131 games and averaged almost a walk per game.

Davis began the 1984 season in Triple-A, with the Salt Lake City Gulls of the Pacific Coast League. After just one game, he was promoted to the majors, due to a hand injury to Ken Phelps on April 6, and Davis remained with Seattle for eight seasons, through 1991. In that only game for Salt Lake, he went 2-for-3 with an RBI and a walk. He never returned to the minors.

==== Major leagues (1984–1991) ====
During a nine-year major league career, Davis batted .280 with 160 home runs and 683 RBI in 1,206 career games. He hit 20-plus homers in three seasons, and drove in over 100 runs twice.

Davis holds the Mariners and MLB record for the most consecutive games reaching base to start a career, with 47. Well-liked by Mariners fans, Davis held most of the young franchise's offensive records until the arrival of Ken Griffey Jr., Edgar Martínez, and Alex Rodriguez. His fellow players thought highly of him as well. "You know sooner or later we're going to score some runs," teammate Ed Vande Berg said in 1984. "We have mister everything on the offense – Mr. Alvin Davis." Tommy John called him a "modern-day George Scott," explaining, "When Scott first came into the league, no one knew how to pitch to him, and they didn't find out for three years."

Davis made his major league debut in the Kingdome on April 11, 1984; he homered in his first two big league games, and collected two doubles in his sixth and three doubles in the next. After his first week, Davis had a .370 batting average, a .778 slugging percentage, and a seven-game hitting streak. He reached base in each of the first 47 games of his career, and was chosen for his only All-Star Game as a rookie. Named the Mariners' MVP, he was also voted the American League (AL) Rookie of the Year, with a .284 batting average, 27 home runs, and 116 RBI in 152 games. Davis hit a career-high 29 home runs in 1987, and he had perhaps his best season in 1989, when he finished second in the AL with a .920 OPS.

With the addition of Pete O'Brien in 1990, Davis was increasingly used as Seattle's designated hitter. He only saw action on defense as a first baseman in 52 games that season, further reduced to just 14 games in 1991. His batting average fell to .221 in 1991 with 12 home runs and 69 RBI in 145 games; with young Tino Martinez in the organization, Davis was not in the team's plans for 1992.

Davis's season high for home runs was 29 in 1987 and his most RBI (116) came as a rookie in 1984. His highest batting average for a season was .305 in 1989. Davis hit the last home run in Chicago's Comiskey Park on September 29th, 1990.

=== California Angels and Kintetsu Buffaloes ===
After eight years in Seattle, Davis signed a one-year, $800,000 contract with the California Angels on February 14, 1992. In 40 games with the Angels in a platoon role, he hit .250 with no homers and 16 RBI. Davis had two hits in his final major league game but was released after only a half season in late June. He soon joined the Kintetsu Buffaloes of Osaka, Japan and appeared in 40 games in the Pacific League, batting .275 with five home runs and 12 RBI.

== Personal life ==
Davis lives in his hometown of Riverside with his wife. They have three children. Davis has been a volunteer at Cornerstone Fellowship Bible Church in Riverside overseeing the church's finances and has served as a member of the church's elder board for over 20 years. He has also previously coached baseball at Martin Luther King High School in Riverside for ten years. After his father's death in 1970, Davis and his mother Mylie had a very close relationship, and she relocated from Riverside to Tempe when he was in college.

In 1997, Davis was inducted into the Seattle Mariners Hall of Fame.

In 2012, Davis returned to the Seattle Mariners as a roving minor league instructor.
