= Duke Energy Children's Museum =

Children's museum in Cincinnati, Ohio, U.S.

Coordinates: 39°06′36″N 84°32′15″W

The Duke Energy Children's Museum, formerly the Cinergy Children's Museum, is a museum in Cincinnati, Ohio, in the United States. It is one of the museums comprising the Cincinnati Museum Center at Union Terminal. Opened in 1998, the museum was moved from historic Longworth Hall near downtown Cincinnati location following the Ohio River Valley Flood of March 1997 that inundated it.

This children's museum features several interactive exhibits with educational value. Most are sponsored by companies that receive name and logo placement in the exhibits themselves, including Banfield Pet Hospital and Kroger. The museum is named for its main sponsor, Duke Energy.

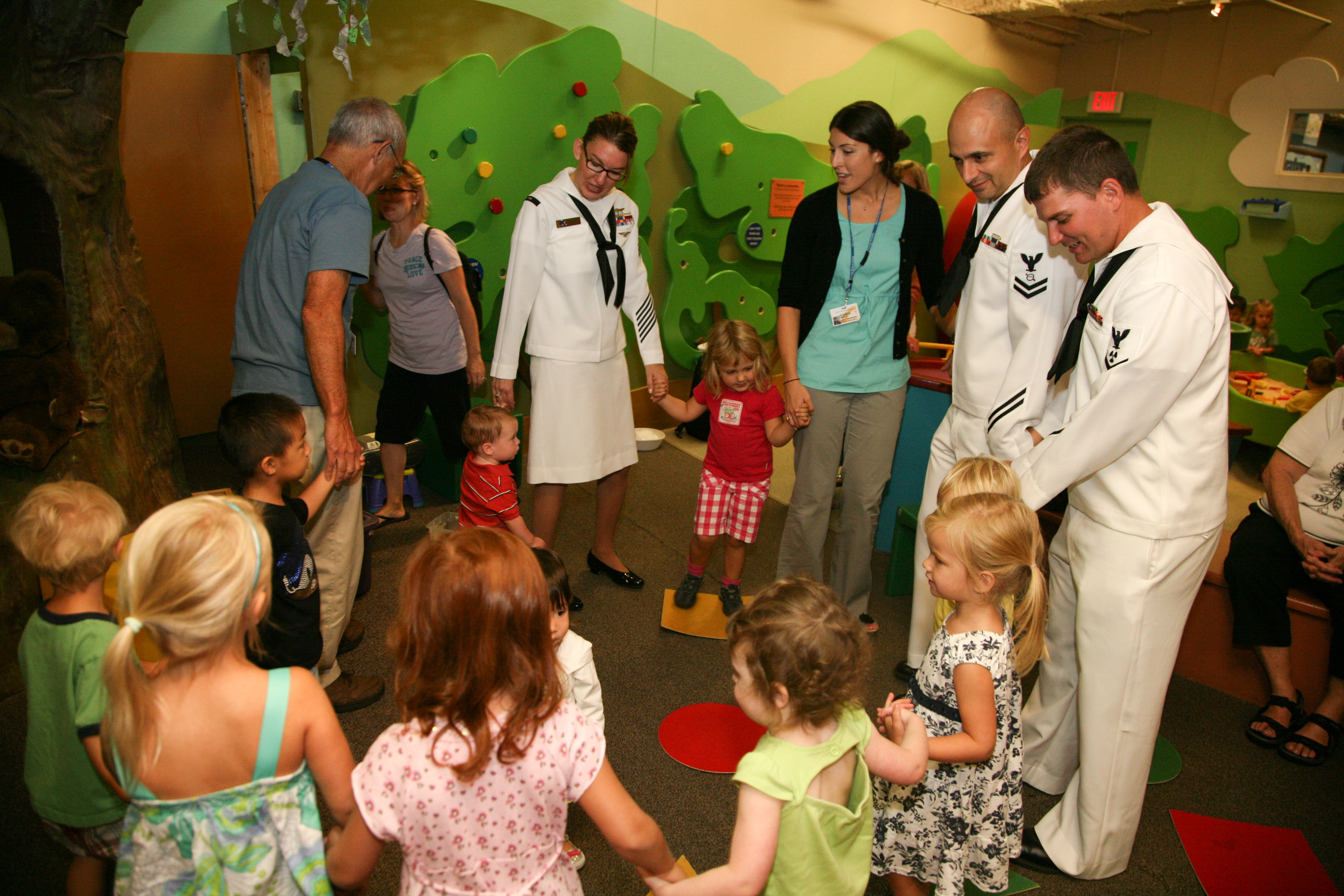
United States Navy sailors visit the museum during Cincinnati Navy Week

Exhibits include a child-sized town with shops and a veterinary clinic, and a farm-inspired playground for preschool-aged children and younger. Older children can engage in active play with equipment such as rope bridges, a climbing wall, an interactive machine with pedal-operated parts, and a tree house. Rooms include animal exhibits and arts and crafts activities. Temporary programs are introduced periodically.

2014 saw the opening of a new aquarium with a collection of fish and turtles.

Families receiving government benefits such as food assistance may receive discounted admission.
