= Baltimore & Ohio Warehouse at Camden Yards =

Building in Baltimore, Maryland, US

Coordinates: 39.2846°N 76.6189°W

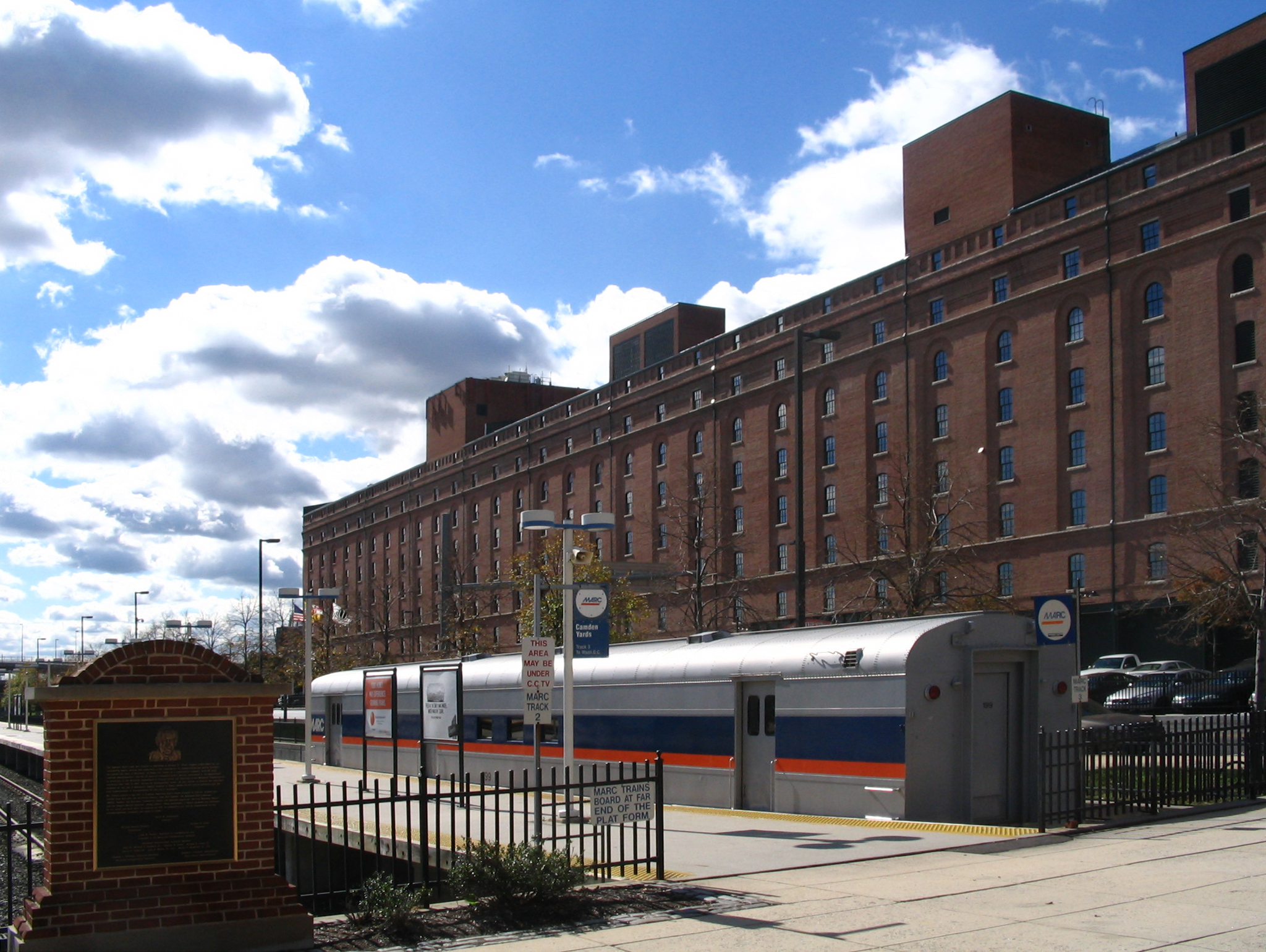
B&O Warehouse, east side

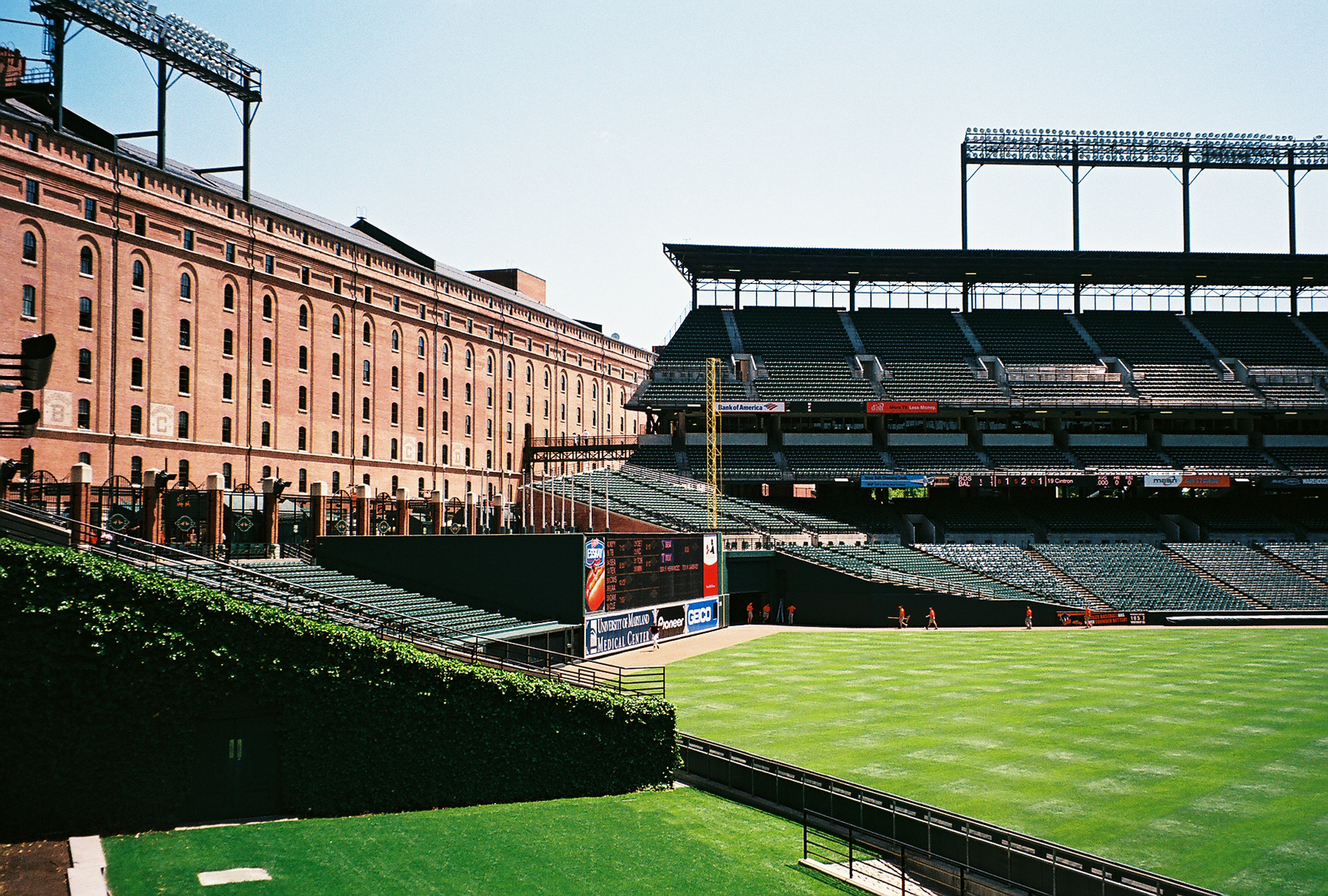
West side, from Oriole Park

Baltimore & Ohio Warehouse at Camden Yards, viewed from Camden & Eutaw.

Baltimore & Ohio Warehouse at Camden Yards is a building in Baltimore, Maryland, adjacent to Oriole Park at Camden Yards. It was constructed by the Baltimore and Ohio Railroad (B&O) beginning in 1899, with later sections completed in 1905, adjacent to the B&O's Camden Station and Freight Yard, which was located at the corner of Camden and Eutaw Streets.

Purported to be the longest brick building on the East Coast, the 1,116-foot (340 m) long, eight-story brick structure had 430,000 square feet (almost 40,000 m^{2}) of floor space for merchandise storage and distribution, large enough to hold 1,000 carloads of freight at a time, the B&O advertised. The similar Longworth Hall, in Cincinnati was longer at 1,277 feet (389 m) long, but was only five stories.

Railroad historian Herbert H. Harwood proclaimed it an "awesome structure ... a truly classic turn-of-the-century railroad warehouse." The warehouse was used by the B&O through the 1960s but was mostly vacant by the 1970s due to the use of trucks and newer, more efficient single-floor warehouses located in industrial parks elsewhere.

The former B&O Warehouse was incorporated into Oriole Park at Camden Yards when it opened in 1992 and looms over the stadium's right field wall. The warehouse was converted to team offices, team spaces, and a private club for the Orioles. It is also used for private wedding receptions.

In the entire history of Oriole Park at Camden Yards, no player has ever hit the warehouse in a game. Ken Griffey Jr. is the only player to hit the B&O Warehouse in fair territory, though it was with a non-regulation baseball in an exhibition. He did so in the 1993 MLB Home Run Derby, in which he tied Juan González before losing in a playoff.
