= Longworth Hall =

- B & O Freight Terminal
- U.S. National Register of Historic Places
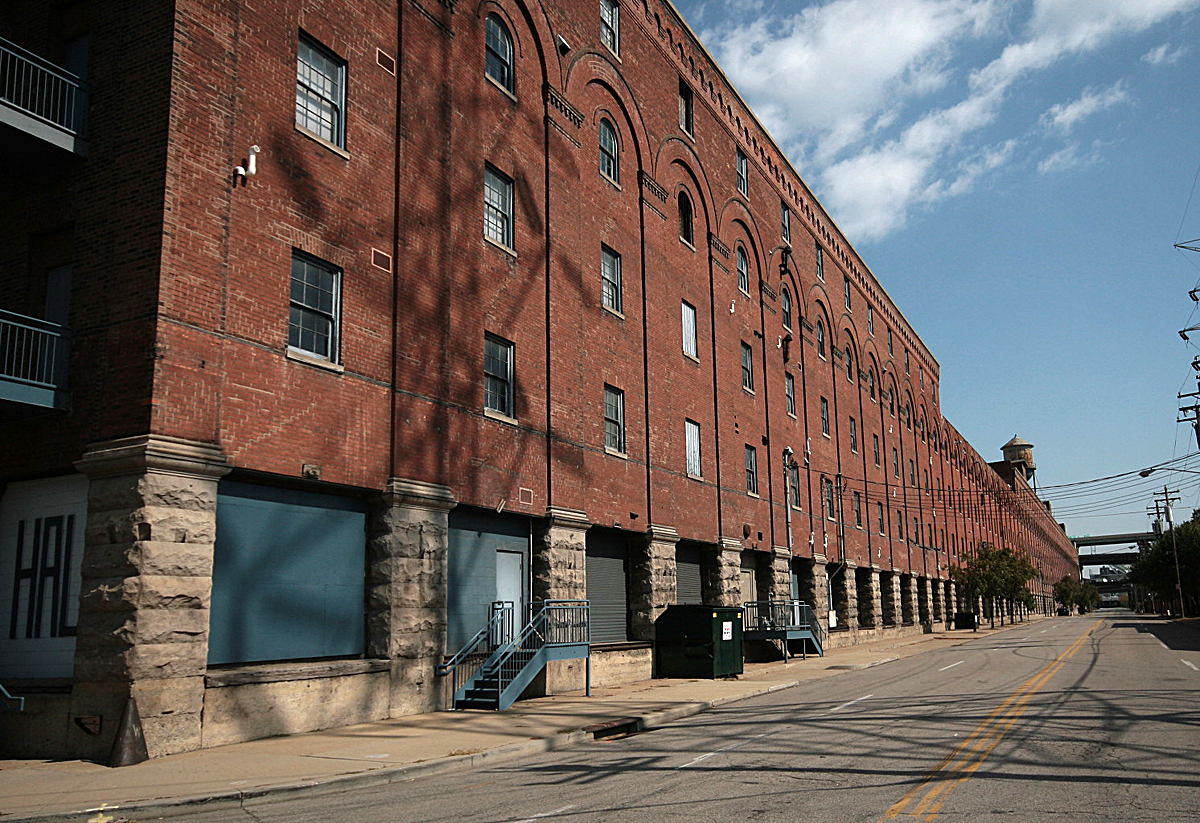
- Longworth Hall now occupies the former B&O freight terminal in Cincinnati.

- Location within Ohio Location within the United States
- Location: Cincinnati, Ohio
- Coordinates: 39°5′44″N 84°31′28″W
- Architect: M.A. Long
- NRHP reference No.: 86003521
- Added to NRHP: December 29, 1986

Longworth Hall is a registered historic building in Cincinnati, listed in the National Register on December 29, 1986. Constructed by the Baltimore and Ohio Railroad in 1904 as the B&O Freight Terminal, the building was reported to be the longest structure of its type in the world at 1,277 feet (389 m) long. Camden Yards in Baltimore, a similar structure, is slightly shorter at 1,116-foot (340 m) long. Longworth Hall is 5 stories, while the Baltimore Freight Terminal is 8 stories.

== History ==
During construction, 80,000 feet (20,000 m) of pilings were driven to support the concrete foundations. The piers between the first floor doors are of Bedford limestone. 4.25 million bricks were used in the walls. Floor loads are carried on steel girders and these in turn are carried on steel columns. Floors, joists, roof beams, etc., are frame requiring 2.5 million board feet (5,900 m^{3}) of lumber.

The lower floor was designed as the inbound freight house with the upper four floors for storage. The facility trackage could accommodate 125 cars. Other facilities included a boiler house, a 6 stall roundhouse, a coal tipple and a U.S. Customs Bonded Warehouse, for the care of imported goods.

Expansion plans for the adjacent Brent Spence Bridge led the Ohio Department of Transportation to purchase the building in 2023. In 2026, demolition began on the 200-foot (61 m) eastern portion of the building, dating from the 1960s, to make room for the new bridge.

== Tenants ==
The Cincinnati Children's Museum occupied all four stories at the western end of Longworth Hall until floodwaters inundated the building during the flood of 1997, forcing the museum to relocate to the Cincinnati Museum Center at Union Terminal the following year. WOXY.com's studios were located in Longworth Hall from September 2004 until the Internet radio station moved to Austin, Texas, in 2009.
