= Seattle Mariners Hall of Fame =

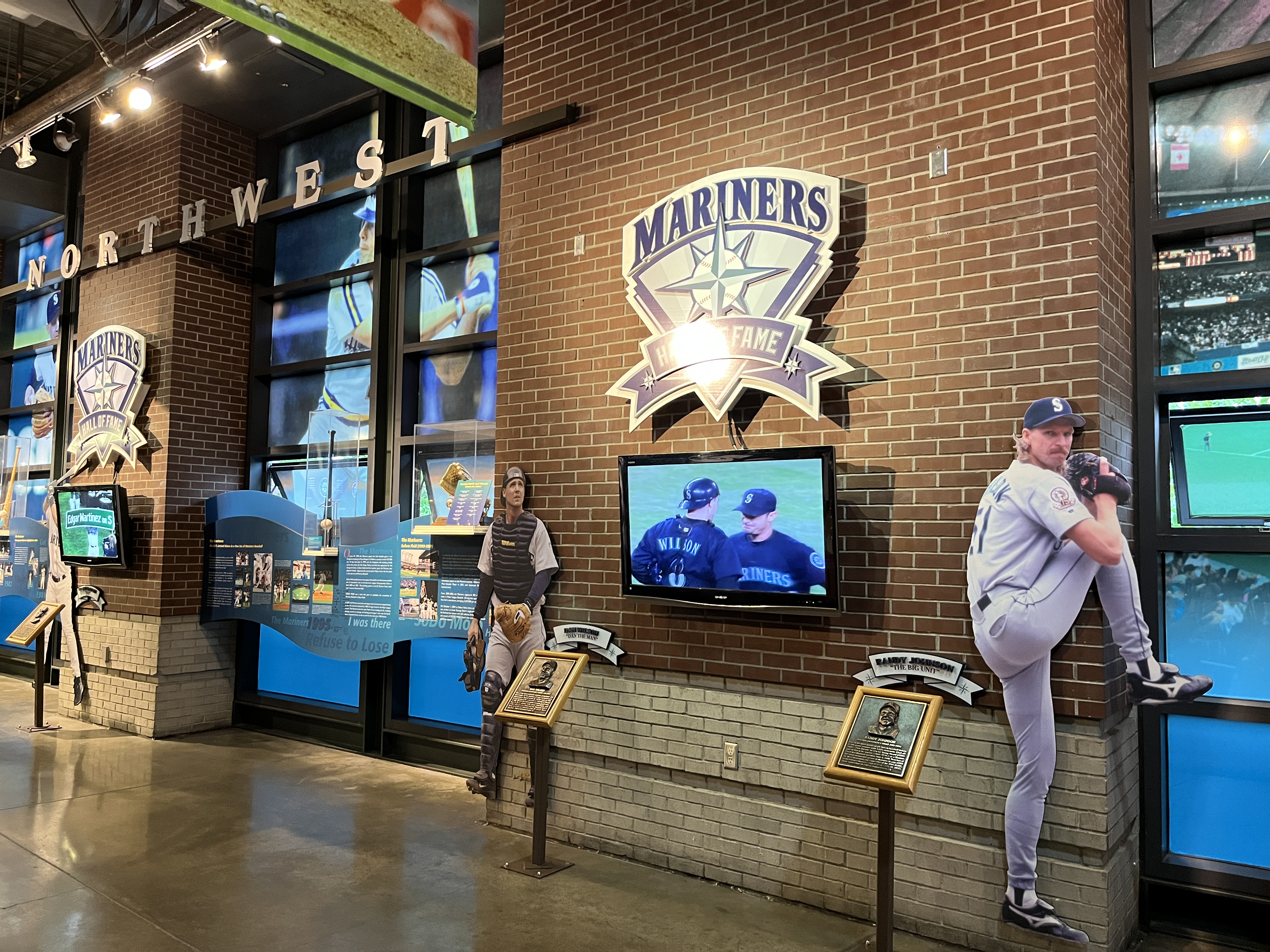
- Established: June 14, 1997
- Location: Seattle, Washington
- Coordinates: 47.591389°N 122.3325°W
- Type: Baseball hall of fame
- Website: Seattle Mariners Hall of Fame Official Web Site

The Seattle Mariners Hall of Fame is an American museum and hall of fame for the Seattle Mariners of Major League Baseball. It is located in T-Mobile Park in the SoDo district of downtown Seattle.

== Museum overview ==
On June 14, 1997, then-Mariners chairman and CEO John Ellis announced the creation of a Mariners Hall of Fame. It is operated by the Seattle Mariners. The museum honors the players, staff, and other individuals that greatly contributed to the history and success of the Mariners. It is located at the Baseball Museum of the Pacific Northwest in T-Mobile Park. Inductees are selected on the criteria that they spent at least five seasons in a Mariners uniform and have been retired from baseball for two seasons. Non-uniform employees must work for the Mariners for at least five years. Inductees include Alvin Davis, Dave Niehaus, Jay Buhner, Edgar Martínez, Randy Johnson, Dan Wilson, Lou Piniella, Ken Griffey Jr., Jamie Moyer, Ichiro Suzuki, and Félix Hernández.

== Inductees ==
Seattle Mariners Hall of Fame
Inducted	Player	Position	Years	Ref
1997	Alvin Davis	1B	1984–1991	
2000	Dave Niehaus	Sportscaster	1977–2010	
2004	Jay Buhner	OF	1988–2001	
2007	Edgar Martínez	3B/DH	1987–2004	
2012	Randy Johnson	P	1989–1998	
2012	Dan Wilson	C	1994–2005	
2013	Ken Griffey Jr.	OF	1989–1999, 2009–2010	
2014	Lou Piniella	Manager	1993–2002	
2015	Jamie Moyer	P	1996–2006	
2022	Ichiro Suzuki	RF	2001–2012, 2018–2019	
2023	Félix Hernández	SP	2005–2019	
