= Ken Griffey Jr. =

American baseball player (born 1969)

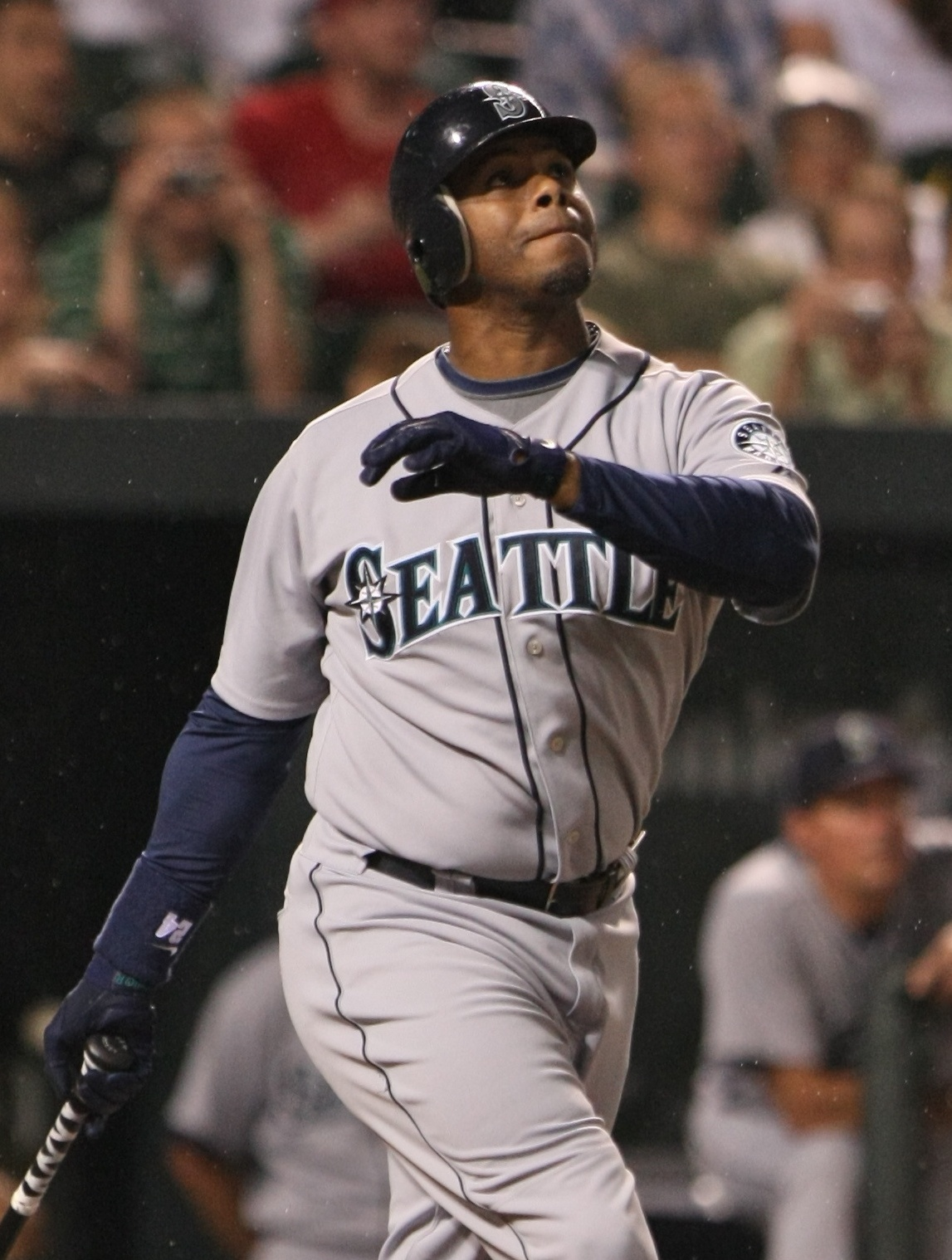
- Griffey with the Seattle Mariners in 2009
- Center fielder
- Born: November 21, 1969 (age 56); Donora, Pennsylvania, U.S.
- Batted: Left Threw: Left

MLB debut
- April 3, 1989, for the Seattle Mariners

Last MLB appearance
- May 31, 2010, for the Seattle Mariners

MLB statistics
- Batting average: .284
- Hits: 2,781
- Home runs: 630
- Runs batted in: 1,836
- Stats at Baseball Reference

Teams
- Seattle Mariners (1989–1999); Cincinnati Reds (2000–2008); Chicago White Sox (2008); Seattle Mariners (2009–2010)

Career highlights and awards
- 13× All-Star (1990–2000, 2004, 2007); AL MVP (1997); 10× Gold Glove Award (1990–1999); 7× Silver Slugger Award (1991, 1993, 1994, 1996–1999); NL Comeback Player of the Year (2005); 4× AL home run leader (1994, 1997–1999); AL RBI leader (1997); Commissioner's Historic Achievement Award; Seattle Mariners No. 24 retired; Seattle Mariners Hall of Fame; Cincinnati Reds Hall of Fame; Major League Baseball All-Century Team

Member of the National

Baseball Hall of Fame
- Induction: 2016
- Vote: 99.3% (first ballot)

George Kenneth Griffey Jr. (born November 21, 1969), nicknamed "Junior" and "the Kid", is an American former professional baseball outfielder who played 22 years in Major League Baseball (MLB). He spent most of his career with the Seattle Mariners and Cincinnati Reds, along with a short stint with the Chicago White Sox. The first overall pick in the 1987 draft and a 13-time All-Star, Griffey is widely considered one of the greatest baseball players of all time. His 630 home runs rank as the seventh-most in MLB history. Griffey was also an exceptional defender and won 10 Gold Glove Awards in center field. He is tied for the record of most consecutive games with a home run (eight, with Don Mattingly and Dale Long).

Griffey signed lucrative deals with companies of international prominence like Nike and Nintendo; his popularity reflected well upon MLB and is credited by some with helping restore its image after the 1994 labor dispute. Griffey is one of only 31 players in baseball history to have appeared in major league games in four different calendar decades.

Following his playing career, Griffey joined the Mariners' front office as a special consultant. He was inducted into both the Mariners Hall of Fame and the Reds Hall of Fame. In 2016, Griffey was elected to the Baseball Hall of Fame in his first year of eligibility, receiving 99.32% of the vote, breaking pitcher Tom Seaver's record of 98.84%, a record that had stood for 24 years.

Griffey is the son of former MLB player Ken Griffey Sr. and the father of former football player Trey Griffey.

== Early life ==
Griffey was born in Donora, Pennsylvania, on November 21, 1969. His family moved to Cincinnati, Ohio, as his father, Ken Griffey Sr., made his MLB debut on August 25, 1973 for the Cincinnati Reds. Griffey Jr. was only three years old at the time. He was in the clubhouse during his father's back-to-back championships in the 1975 and 1976 World Series. When Griffey was a young child, his father instilled in him the pride of a team accomplishment rather than the individual performance: "My dad would have bopped me on the head when I was a kid if I came home bragging about what I did on the field. He only wanted to know what the team did." An incident during his father's tenure with the New York Yankees, where Griffey Jr. was told to leave the dugout while sitting with his father, while a white player's (Graig Nettles) son was allowed to practice on the field, would lead to Griffey Jr. refusing to contemplate signing with the Yankees during his career.

Griffey attended Archbishop Moeller High School in Cincinnati, the same high school as his future teammate Barry Larkin, where he was the U.S. high school baseball player of the year in 1987. He hit .478 with 17 home runs in his two seasons of high school baseball. Griffey also played football as a wide receiver and received scholarship offers to play college football for such programs as Oklahoma and Michigan.

== Professional career ==
=== Draft and minor leagues ===
The Seattle Mariners selected Griffey with the first overall selection of the 1987 Major League Baseball draft, held on June 2, 1987. He received a signing bonus of $160,000. On June 11, 1987, Griffey joined the Bellingham Mariners of the Class A short season Northwest League. He made his professional debut on June 16 and hit his first professional home run the following day against the Everett Giants at Everett Memorial Stadium. A bronze plaque was installed at the approximate site of the ball's landing spot—387 feet (118 m) from home plate. In 54 games with Bellingham, he hit .313 with 14 home runs, 40 runs batted in (RBI), and 13 steals. Baseball America magazine named him the Northwest League's best prospect.

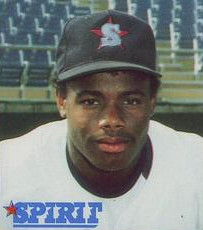
Griffey in 1988 as a member of the San Bernardino Spirit

In 1988, Griffey joined the San Bernardino Spirit of the High-A California League. During his 58 games, Griffey batted .338, hit 11 home runs, drove in 42 runs, and stole 32 bases. Late in the season, Griffey was promoted to the Vermont Mariners of the Double-A Eastern League. He played the final 17 games with the club, hitting .279 with two home runs and 10 RBI. Griffey had a total of 129 games in his two seasons in the minor leagues, earning 103 total runs and 27 total home runs.

=== Seattle Mariners (1989–1999) ===
A mural of Griffey in downtown Seattle from the strike-shortened 1994 season. The tick-marks represent his home runs up to the time of the strike, when Griffey Jr. was chasing the single-season home run record set by Roger Maris in 1961.

In his first 11 seasons with Seattle (1989–1999), Griffey established himself as one of the most prolific and exciting players of the era, racking up 1,752 hits, 398 home runs, 1,152 RBI, and 167 stolen bases. He led the American League in home runs for four seasons (1994, 1997, 1998, and 1999), was voted the A.L. MVP in 1997, and batted .297.

Griffey's defense in center field was widely considered the standard of elite fielding during the decade, exemplified by his streak of 10 consecutive Gold Gloves from 1990 to 1999. His impressive range allowed frequent spectacular diving plays, and he often dazzled fans with over-the-shoulder basket catches and robbed opposing hitters of home runs by leaping up and pulling them back into the field of play. He was a frequent participant in the All-Star Game with the Mariners and led the American League multiple times in different hitting categories. He was featured on the Wheaties cereal box and had his own signature sneaker line from Nike.

One of Griffey's signature sneakers, the Nike Air Griffey Max.

On April 3, 1989, in his first MLB plate appearance, Griffey hit a line-drive double off Oakland Athletics pitcher Dave Stewart at the Oakland Coliseum. One week later in his first at-bat at the Kingdome, Griffey hit his first major league home run. Entering the majors, Griffey was a highly touted prospect. In 1989, he was the #1 card in Upper Deck's first set of baseball cards, with his card becoming one of the most popular cards of its era. He also licensed a chocolate bar in 1989 in Seattle that sold more than 1 million bars in its first year.

In 1990 and 1991, Griffey and his father became the first son and father to play on the same team at the same time. In his father's first game as a Mariner, on August 31, 1990, the pair hit back-to-back singles in the first inning and both scored. On September 14, the pair hit back-to-back home runs in the top of the first off California Angels pitcher Kirk McCaskill, becoming the first father-son duo to hit back-to-back home runs. On September 21, Ken Griffey Jr. stole a fly ball hit by Sammy Sosa from his father, who was playing left field, for the third out of the inning. Then-20 year old Griffey Jr. was subsequently grounded by his father in the dugout after the play for going inside the former's previously established "three square feet territory" in left field for fly balls and had his car keys confiscated. The duo played a total of 51 games together before Griffey Sr. retired in June 1991.

At the MLB Home Run Derby in 1993, held at Oriole Park in Baltimore, Griffey hit the warehouse beyond the right-field wall on the fly and he is still the only player ever to do so. As with every home run that hits Eutaw Street, each feat is honored with a circular plaque, embedded in the concourse's walkway, in the exact spot where the ball landed. In 1994, he led the league in All-Star voting. That season, which ended prematurely in August due to the players' strike, Griffey hit 30 home runs in the Mariners' first 65 games. He had four multi-home run games that year. Although his pace cooled somewhat in the final eight weeks of the season (he only hit 10 home runs in the Mariners' last 47 games), his 40 home runs by August 12 led the American League, two ahead of Chicago's Frank Thomas and four ahead of Cleveland's Albert Belle.

One of the most memorable moments of Griffey's career with the Mariners came during the 1995 American League Division Series (ALDS) against the New York Yankees. After losing the first two games, the Mariners and Griffey were on the verge of elimination, but came back to win the next two games, setting up a decisive fifth game. In the bottom of the 11th inning of Game 5, with Griffey on first base, teammate Edgar Martínez hit a double. Griffey raced around the bases, slid into home with the winning run, and popped up into the waiting arms of the entire team. The 1995 ALDS kicked off a brief rivalry between the Yankees and Mariners. Griffey may have escalated it by saying that he would never play for the Yankees, because the Yankees allegedly treated his father, Ken Griffey Sr. badly. Also, when Griffey was a kid visiting his dad in the Yankee clubhouse, Yankee manager Billy Martin would, believing that children did not belong in the clubhouse, kick him out. Although the Mariners subsequently lost the ALCS to the Cleveland Indians, The Double and Griffey's run remains one of the most memorable events in Mariners history, capping a season that "saved baseball in Seattle", Seattle's improbable late-season playoff run that year, spurred by Griffey's return from injury, led to the construction of Safeco Field and the future security of a franchise rumored for years to be on the move. The play also inspired the title of the video game Ken Griffey Jr.'s Winning Run for the Super Nintendo.

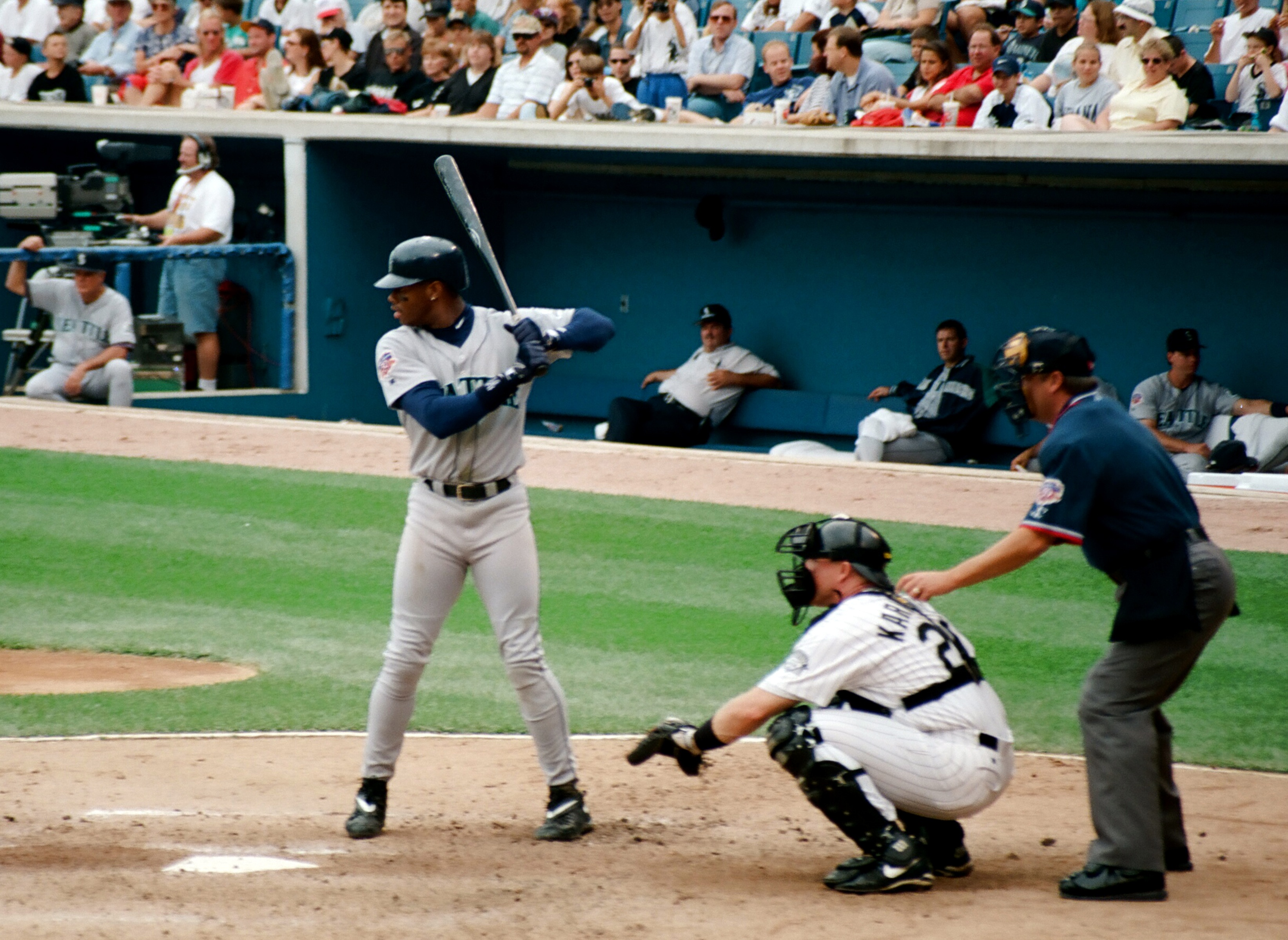
Griffey bats for the Mariners, 1997

In 1997, Griffey led the Mariners to the AL West title and captured the American League Most Valuable Player Award, hitting .304 with 56 home runs and 147 RBI during 157 games. On April 15, 1997, Griffey wore the number 42, which led to an MLB tradition started in 1999 known as Jackie Robinson Day. The next season, 1998, was a season which was followed closely by the national media as both Griffey and Mark McGwire entered the summer ahead of the pace of Roger Maris' home run record of 61. Despite Griffey falling short, Major League Baseball put forth an effort to draw a new set of young fans and regain those disenchanted by the 1994 strike focused on McGwire, Chicago Cubs slugger Sammy Sosa, and Griffey's pursuit of Maris' record. Griffey, however, fell out of the spotlight due to some nagging injuries and was surpassed by McGwire and Sosa, who both broke the record set by Maris. Despite falling out of the record chase, Griffey nearly duplicated his 1997 statistics, finishing with a .284 average, 56 home runs and 146 RBI in 161 games.

In 1999, he ranked 93rd on The Sporting News' list of the 100 Greatest Baseball Players. This list was compiled during the 1998 season, counting only statistics through 1997. At age 29 (going on 30), he was the youngest player on the list. That year, Griffey was elected to the MLB All-Century Team. However, when TSN updated their list for a new book in 2005, despite having surpassed 400 and 500 home runs, Griffey remained at Number 93.

While with Seattle, Griffey was a 10-time American League Gold Glove winner, the 1992 All-Star Game MVP, 1997 AL MVP, 1998 ESPY co-winner for Male Athlete of the Year, 1999 Players Choice Awards Player of the Decade (by the players), and was named to the All-Century team in 1999.

==== Departure from Seattle (1999–2000) ====
Griffey formerly lived in the same neighborhood in Orlando as golfer Payne Stewart. After Stewart's death in a plane crash on October 25, 1999, Griffey started expressing a desire to live closer to his relatives in his hometown of Cincinnati. Not only did Griffey want to live closer, but he wanted to be able to raise his kids, Trey and Taryn (Tevin was not born at the time). On February 10, 2000, Griffey was traded to the Reds for pitcher Brett Tomko, outfielder Mike Cameron, and minor leaguers Antonio Perez and Jake Meyer. Griffey signed a nine-year, $112.5 million contract with the Reds following the trade, with a club option for a 10th. Earlier that offseason, Griffey vetoed a trade to the New York Mets for Roger Cedeño, Octavio Dotel, and a relief pitcher variously reported as Dennis Cook or Armando Benítez. Griffey's agent, Brian Goldberg, said afterward that Griffey would only accept a trade to the Reds, and "[i]f he can't go to Cincinnati, then he's going back to Seattle for the final year of his contract."

=== Cincinnati Reds (2000–2008) ===
==== 2000–2004 ====
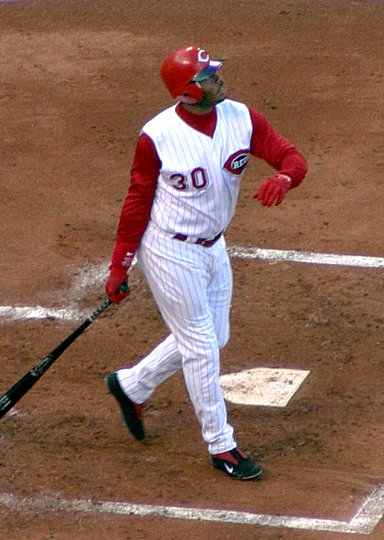
Griffey, batting for the Cincinnati Reds.

In 2000, Griffey changed his number from 24 to 30, the number his father wore while playing in both Cincinnati and Seattle; the number 24 was already retired in honor of Tony Pérez. The 2000 season began what has generally been seen as a decline in Griffey's superstar status. Although his statistics during this season were respectable, they were far below his previous level of play: in 145 games, Griffey hit .271 with 40 home runs and 118 RBI, but his .942 on-base plus slugging was his lowest mark in five years. From 2001 through 2004, Griffey was plagued by a string of injuries, including season-ending injuries in 2002, 2003, and 2004. The cumulative effects of the injuries lowered his bat speed, resulting in less power and fewer home runs (he slugged only .426 before succumbing to injury in 2002, his lowest output in seven years). Injuries forced Griffey to miss 260 out of 486 games from 2002 through 2004, diminishing both his skills and his star reputation.

In 2004, Griffey avoided major injury during the first half of the season, and on June 20 became the 20th player to hit 500 career home runs. His 500th home run came on Father's Day in a game against the St. Louis Cardinals at Busch Stadium, with his father in the stands; the homer tied Griffey with his father in career hits with 2,143. However, the injury bug bit again just before the All-Star break; he suffered a partial hamstring tear, knocking him out of the All-Star Game and putting him on the disabled list yet again.

Griffey finished the 2004 season on the disabled list after suffering a rupture of his right hamstring in San Francisco. The play in question occurred at AT&T Park in a game against the San Francisco Giants. Griffey was starting in right field for the first time in his 16-year Major League career when he raced toward the gap to try to cut off a ball before it got to the wall. He slid as he got to the ball, but in the process hyper-extended his right leg, tearing the hamstring completely off the bone. He later came out of the game, complaining of "tightness" in the hamstring exacerbated by chilly conditions in San Francisco. However, there was far more to it than anyone realized at the time.

Shortly after this injury, the Reds' team physician, Timothy Kremchek, devised an experimental surgery dubbed "The Junior Operation" that would use three titanium screws to reattach Griffey's hamstring. For several weeks, Griffey's right leg was in a sling that kept it at a 90-degree angle, and he was not able to move the leg until late October. After an intense rehabilitation period, he returned for the 2005 season. In April, he hit .244 with one homer (on April 30) and nine RBI.

==== 2005–2006 ====
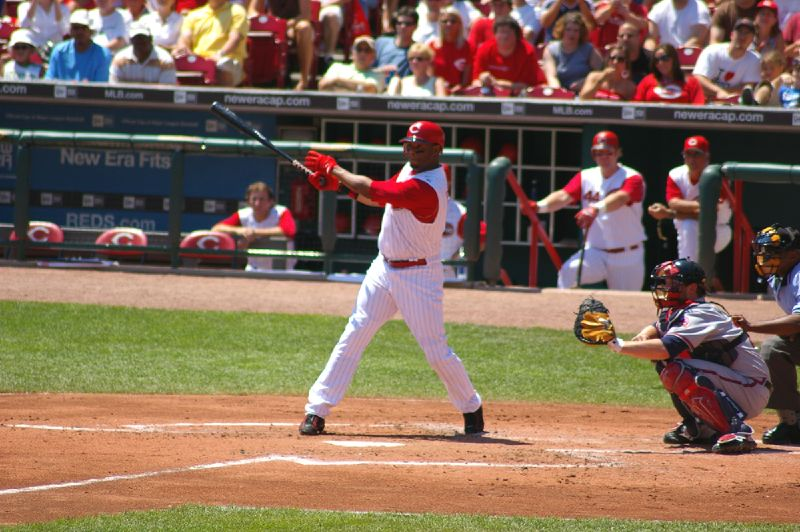
Griffey played in his hometown of Cincinnati from 2000 to 2008.

Starting May 1, the 2005 season saw the resurgence of a healthy Griffey. His 35 home runs were his highest since his first year with the Reds as Griffey slowly moved up the career home run list. He ended the season tied with Mickey Mantle, after having passed Jimmie Foxx, Ted Williams, Willie McCovey, Ernie Banks, Eddie Mathews, Mel Ott, and Eddie Murray.

Early in September, he strained a tendon in his left foot (an injury unrelated to his past hamstring and calf problems), and was listed as day-to-day for several weeks. On September 22, with the Reds out of playoff contention, Griffey decided to sit out for the rest of the season so he could immediately have arthroscopic surgery on his left knee and a separate operation to repair scars from his 2004 hamstring operation. Still, his 128 games in 2005 were the most he had played since 2000. Griffey's resurgence was recognized when he was named National League Comeback Player of the Year. He played in the World Baseball Classic for the American team that off-season with his father as a coach. Griffey batted .524, but the USA failed to reach the semifinals.

At the start of the 2006 season, Griffey changed his number from 30 to 3 to honor his three children. During the second game of the 2006 regular season, Griffey hit home run #537, surpassing Mickey Mantle for 12th on the all-time list. He returned on May 11 from a knee injury suffered April 12, and hit a walk-off three-run home run in the bottom of the 11th inning against the Washington Nationals. On June 5, Griffey tied Fred McGriff's record by hitting a home run in his 43rd different ballpark, at the St. Louis Cardinals' Busch Stadium. On June 19, Griffey hit career home run #548 against the Mets, tying him with Mike Schmidt, and then six days later passed Schmidt with #549 against the Cleveland Indians. On June 27, he hit his 550th career home run against the Kansas City Royals. On September 25, 2006, Griffey hit his 27th home run of the season against Chicago Cubs relief pitcher Scott Eyre to tie Reggie Jackson for tenth on the all-time home run list.

Griffey's injuries continued in the 2006 off-season. While on holiday in the Bahamas with his family, he broke his wrist. Griffey said his hand felt fine and he expected to be ready to go for 2007 spring training.

==== 2007 ====
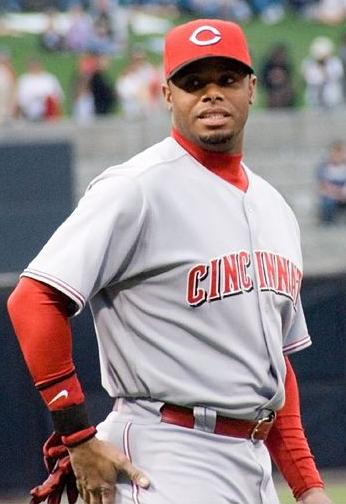
Griffey in 2007 with the Reds

At the beginning of the 2007 Major League Baseball season, Ryan Freel took over center field for the Reds, and Griffey Jr. was moved to right field. Reds manager Jerry Narron said, "I've got to do everything I can do to put our best club out there. My feeling is that with Ryan Freel out there, it gives us strong defense up the middle."

On May 10, 2007, Griffey hit his sixth home run of the season and the 569th of his career, tying Rafael Palmeiro for ninth place on the career home runs list. He passed Palmeiro on May 13 against the Los Angeles Dodgers. Griffey tied Harmon Killebrew for eighth on the all-time list hitting his 573rd career home run on May 22. He then surpassed him on May 25 against the Pittsburgh Pirates.

On June 22, 2007, Griffey made his first return to Seattle after his trade to the Reds. Before the game, the Mariners honored him with a 15-minute presentation which included a highlight reel of his playing career with the Mariners, a presentation of a "The House that Griffey Built" memorial by Mariners hall-of-famers and former teammates Jay Buhner and Edgar Martínez, and a four-minute standing ovation from the sold-out crowd. Griffey did not expect such a welcome or a turnout by fans when he came back, and a short but emotional speech was given by Griffey afterwards. Many of the fans in attendance made signs professing their gratitude and adoration toward him with quotes such as: "The House that Griffey Built", "Seattle Junior", and "Griffey we miss you." Griffey went 1-for-5 in the game. On June 24, Griffey hit his 583rd and 584th career home runs, tying and passing Mark McGwire for seventh place on the all-time career home run list.

Wow. Never did I imagine that it would be like this coming back. I spent 11 years here, 11 wonderful years here. ... This place will be [my] home. ... I didn't realize how much I missed being in Seattle.

— An excerpt from Griffey's short speech as noted above.

Following the Cincinnati Reds versus Seattle Mariners series from June 22–24, 2007, a fan movement emerged petitioning Mariners' management to bring Griffey back. Over 1,900 signatures were collected on a fan vid-blog/petition.

Griffey received the most votes of any player in the National League for the 2007 All-Star balloting, and in the July 10 game, he went on to drive in two runs for the National League. On July 16, 2007, Griffey hit his 587th home run to pass Frank Robinson for sixth place on the all-time home run list. On July 18, 2007, Griffey hit his 2,500th hit, a first-inning single off Atlanta Braves starting pitcher John Smoltz.

On September 19, 2007, in a game against the Chicago Cubs, Griffey fielded a Derrek Lee single in right field, then suddenly went down in pain. The injury, first thought to be a lower abdominal strain, was later revealed to be a season-ending groin strain. This marked one of many seasons in Cincinnati in which Griffey had to end the year on the disabled list. Griffey ended the 2007 season with 593 career home runs.

On August 22, 2007, Griffey was selected as an all-time Rawlings Gold Glove winner, on a list of nine players considered the greatest defensive players in the last 50 years. He finished the season with 78 runs, 146 hits, 24 doubles, one triple, 30 home runs, 93 RBI, and a .277 batting average in 144 games.

==== 2008 ====
On April 4, 2008, Griffey passed Reggie Jackson for 16th on the all-time list after driving in his 1,702nd run. On June 9, Griffey hit his 600th home run on a 3–1 pitch from Mark Hendrickson of the Florida Marlins in the first inning at Land Shark Stadium in Miami. Fans of both teams gave him a standing ovation.

Despite being ranked second in the National League All-Star voting for outfielders for most of the first half of the season, Griffey finished fourth with 2,907,746 ballots, 87,000 votes behind Kosuke Fukudome. He was not selected to the All-Star Game as a reserve. At the All-Star Break, Griffey was batting .239 with 12 home runs and 42 RBI. "I always have a backup plan... If you can't hit a tough lefty, bunt. If you can't hit a tough righty, bunt. If you can't go to the All-Star Game, go to the Bahamas," Griffey said.

On July 30, Griffey hit his 608th career home run in his last game for the Reds.

Griffey was criticized by some for his effort during his stint with the Reds. Gregg Doyel had this to say of the years Griffey was with the Reds in comparison to the 2010 Reds team: "It's a different Reds team than the older, beer-bellied softball teams of recent years. Those Reds were Ken Griffey and Adam Dunn lounging on the clubhouse's leather couches, hitting home runs, misplaying balls in the outfield, and thinking they had it all figured out, when all they knew how to do was lose."

=== Chicago White Sox (2008) ===
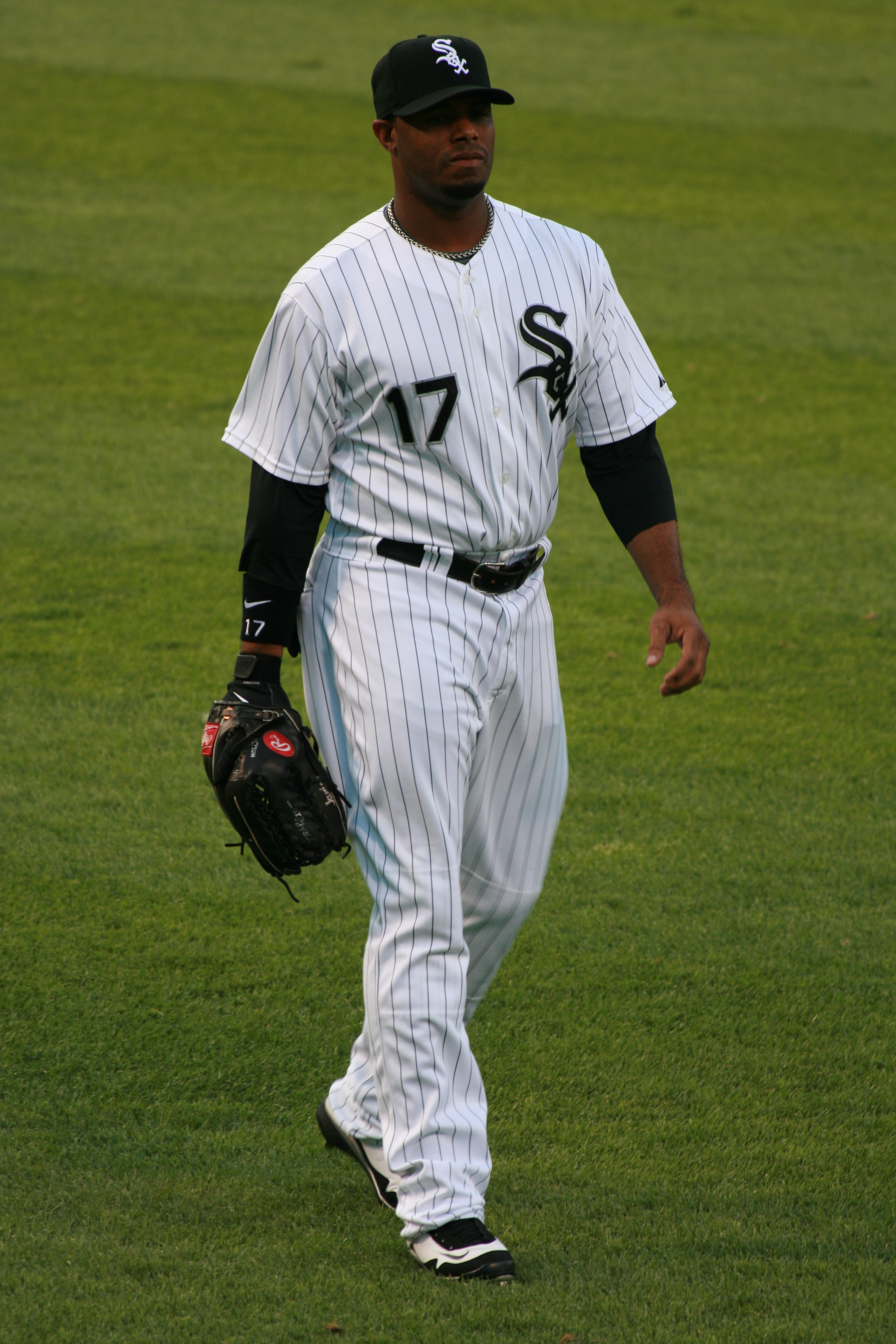
Ken Griffey Jr. in 2008 with the Chicago White Sox

On July 31, 2008, at the MLB trade deadline, Griffey was traded to the Chicago White Sox for pitcher Nick Masset and infielder Danny Richar, ending his nine-year tenure in Cincinnati. In his first game with the White Sox, he went 2-for-3 with 2 RBI, a walk, and a run.

On August 20, 2008, Griffey hit his first home run as a member of the White Sox, off the Mariners' R. A. Dickey, which moved him into a tie with former outfielder Sammy Sosa for fifth place in career home runs. He surpassed Sosa on September 23, with one off Minnesota's Matt Guerrier.

Griffey's signature moment with the White Sox came on September 30, the last game of the 2008 season; an extra 163rd game between the White Sox and Minnesota Twins to break the tie atop the AL Central. In the fifth inning of the scoreless game, the Twins threatened with Michael Cuddyer on third and one out. Twins third baseman Brendan Harris flied out softly to Griffey in center field, who threw a strike to White Sox catcher A. J. Pierzynski, who tagged out Cuddyer at home in a home plate collision to complete the double play and end the threat. The White Sox went on to beat the Twins, 1–0, to advance to the 2008 American League Division Series, where they fell to the Tampa Bay Rays.

On October 30, 2008, the White Sox declined a $16 million option on Griffey, making him a free agent for the first time in his career. Griffey received a buyout for $4 million, split between the Reds and White Sox. Griffey hit .249 with 18 home runs and 71 RBI during 143 games with the Reds and White Sox in 2008. When the 2008 season ended he said he wouldn't retire, saying "I've got things to do."

=== Seattle Mariners (second stint) (2009–2010) ===
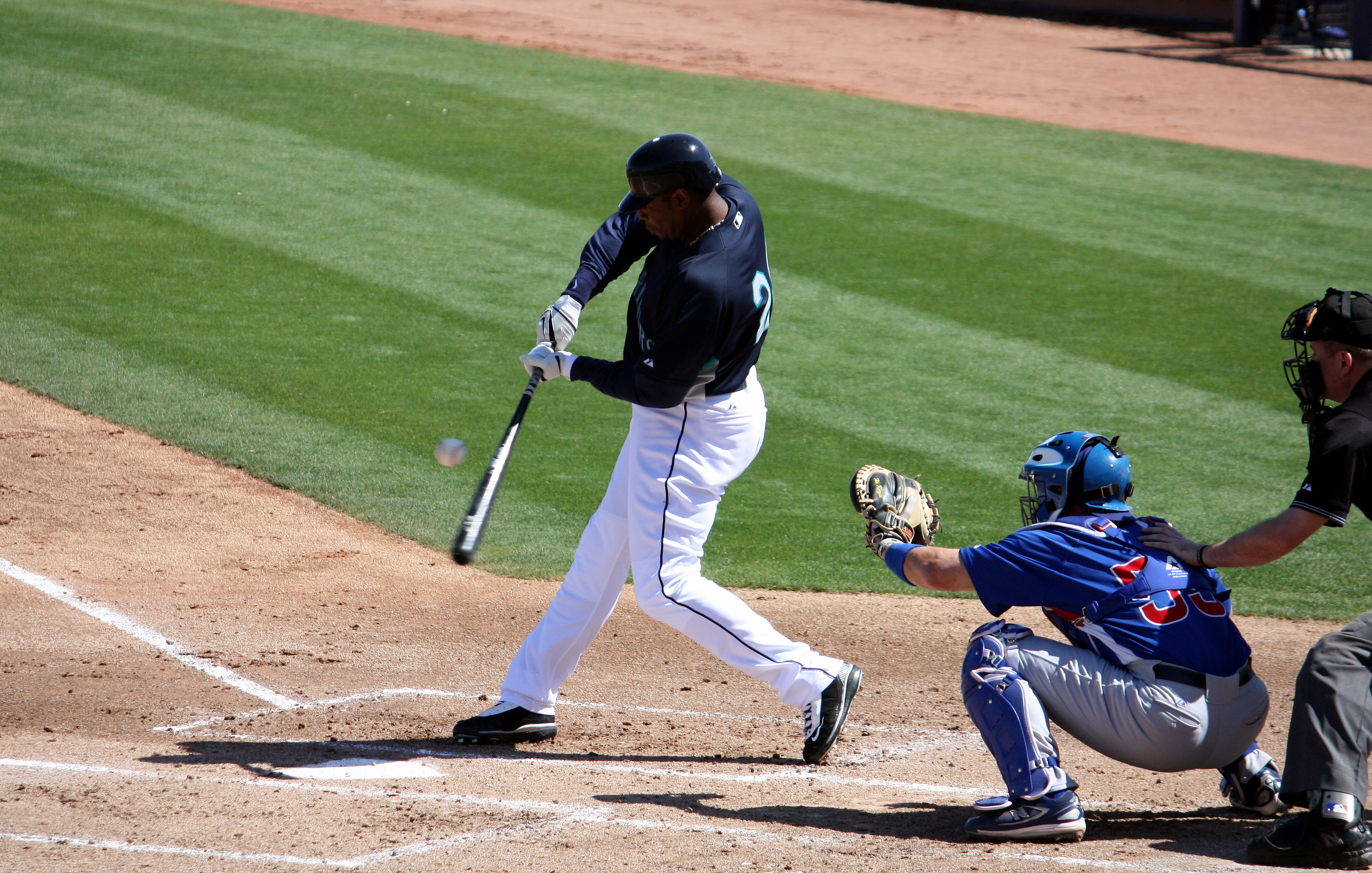
Griffey, batting against the Cubs after returning to the Mariners during Spring training, March 2009.

As a free agent, Griffey was courted by the Mariners and the Atlanta Braves. The national media was dubious about Griffey's ability to contribute meaningfully, with The Washington Post noting "... the Mariners are not about to sign Griffey for baseball reasons; they're bringing him back to Seattle to sell tickets." Griffey ultimately accepted a contract offer from the Mariners on February 18, 2009, after "agonizing" over the decision. Griffey indicated he was motivated by sentimental reasons toward Seattle, where he received an overwhelmingly positive reception when he last played there as a Cincinnati Red in June 2007, but was inclined towards the Braves for its proximity to his home in Orlando, Florida, and his desire to be with his family during the season. Apparently, Griffey was very close to signing with the Braves; however, a premature report emerged from The Atlanta Journal-Constitution that an Atlanta deal was done and a conversation with Willie Mays and his own 13-year-old daughter played a factor in his choice. Griffey once again sported #24 with the Mariners; the team had not issued the number to any player or coach in the nine years between his two stints in Seattle.

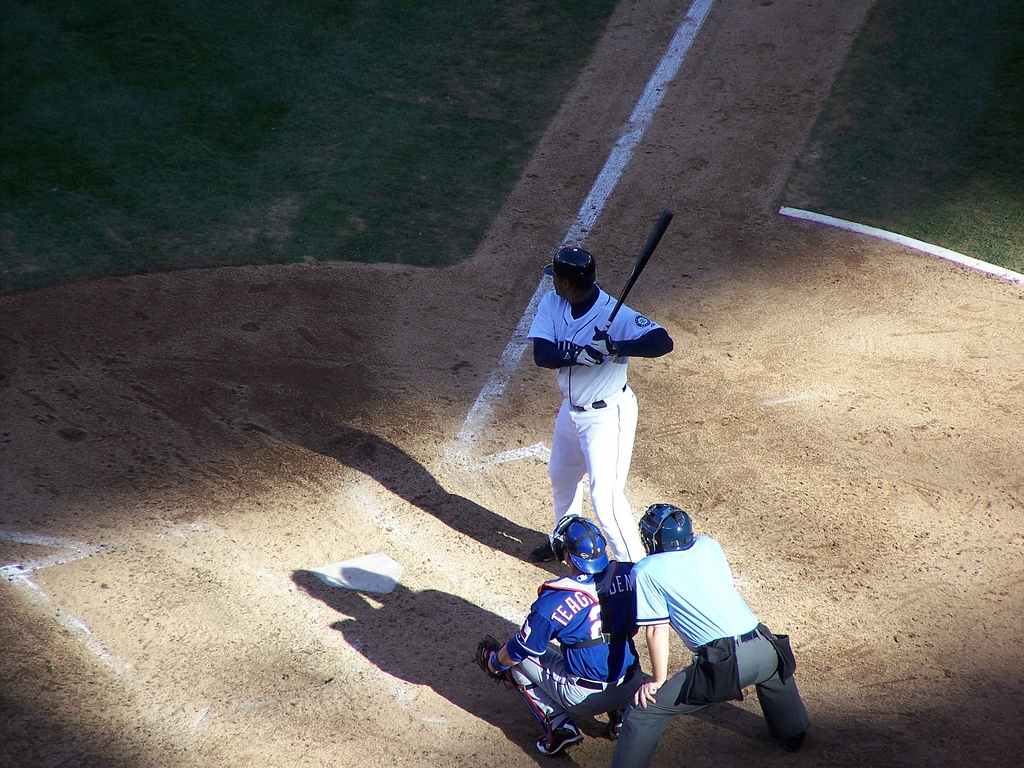
Ken Griffey Jr. during his final plate appearance of the 2009 season.

Griffey went 1-for-3 with a home run in his regular-season debut on April against the Minnesota Twins. The home run was Griffey's eighth Opening Day home run; as of 2025, he is tied with Frank Robinson and Adam Dunn for first place in this category. On April 15, 2009, Griffey hit his 400th home run as a Mariner (613th of career), off Los Angeles Angels pitcher Jered Weaver, becoming the first MLB player to hit 400 home runs with one club (Mariners) and 200 home runs with another (Reds). AP stated, "Griffey returned to the Mariners in 2009 and almost single-handedly transformed what had been a fractured, bickering clubhouse with his leadership, energy and constant pranks."

On June 23, 2009, at Safeco Field, Griffey hit the 5,000th home run in franchise history, off San Diego Padres pitcher Chad Gaudin. This was Griffey's 619th career home run. On July 1, Griffey hit career home run 621 at the new Yankee Stadium, off Yankees pitcher Andy Pettitte in the sixth inning. It marked the 44th different ballpark in which he had hit a home run. On August 12, 2009, against his former team, the Chicago White Sox, he hit a run-scoring single in the bottom of the 14th inning to win the game, 1–0, for the Mariners.

Griffey returned to the Mariners for the 2010 campaign with a similar one-year contract to that of 2009, but struggled offensively over the first two months while posting a .184 batting average. On April 27, Griffey passed Andre Dawson for 45th on the career hit list. On May 20, in a game against the Toronto Blue Jays, Griffey hit a run-scoring single off Blue Jays' closer Kevin Gregg to win the game, 4–3, for the Mariners. After starting the ninth inning trailing 3–1, the Mariners rallied in the bottom of the ninth to load the bases on two singles and a walk, then tied the game via a walk and a sacrifice fly. The walk-off single was the final hit and run batted in of Griffey's MLB career, and moved him past Rafael Palmeiro to 14th on the all-time RBI list.

=== Retirement ===
In May 2010, Mariners' manager Don Wakamatsu made the decision to significantly limit Griffey's play due to his ongoing poor performance. On May 10, beat writer Larry LaRue reported that Wakamatsu had not used Griffey in a pinch-hitting situation the prior week, with two players stating that Griffey had been asleep. National media quickly covered the incident, dubbed "Napgate". In the ensuing days, teammate Mike Sweeney said he challenged anyone who said Griffey was asleep "to stand up and fight me" with Wakamatsu denying Griffey had been asleep; however, Griffey did not deny it. Griffey's agent said in a radio interview that LaRue's initial report had been posted in error and that LaRue had asked his newspaper to remove it, a claim both LaRue and his editor denied. In the aftermath of his report, some Mariners players boycotted LaRue.

On June 2, with the clubhouse still in turmoil, Griffey left the Mariners after the second game of a four-game series against the Minnesota Twins, leaving in the middle of the night for a cross-country drive to his home in Florida. He released a statement through the Mariners announcing his retirement effective immediately. Mariners president Chuck Armstrong was only made aware of this by Griffey's agent a few hours before gametime the next day; Griffey then called from the road to confirm it. His retirement was announced at Safeco Field before the Mariners played the Twins. In an interview on March 17, 2011, Griffey stated he had retired to avoid being a distraction for the team.

== Post-playing career ==
On February 17, 2011, Griffey was hired by the Mariners as a special consultant. He is involved with the Mariners at spring training and the regular season, along with visiting most of the Mariners minor-league affiliates.

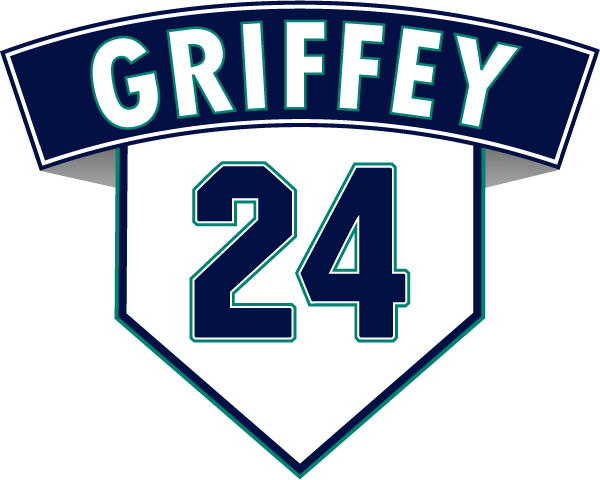
Ken Griffey Jr.'s number 24 was retired by the Seattle Mariners in 2016.

On January 22, 2013, the Mariners announced Griffey would be the seventh person inducted into the Seattle Mariners Hall of Fame. Griffey joined Alvin Davis (1997), Dave Niehaus (2000), Jay Buhner (2004), Edgar Martínez (2007), Randy Johnson (2012) and Dan Wilson (2012). He was formally inducted on August 10.

A campaign had been formed to rename a section of First Avenue South, which runs adjacent to T-Mobile Park, to Ken Griffey Jr. Drive just after his announcement to retire from baseball. Later, the campaign changed direction after the death of Mariners announcer Dave Niehaus in November 2010 to Dave Niehaus Way South.

Writer Bill Simmons pointed out the prevalent belief that Griffey was the best home run hitter of the 1990s who everyone was convinced never used performance enhancing drugs. Therefore, Simmons stated Griffey was the one player who would be the most devastating to "an entire generation of American men" should he ever be linked to steroids.

On August 9, 2014, Griffey was inducted into the Cincinnati Reds Hall of Fame. Griffey returned to Cincinnati for the weekend activities and choked up during his speech when he mentioned wearing the same uniform as his dad. Ron Oester, Dave Parker, and Jake Beckley joined Griffey in the Class of 2014.

In 2018, The Seattle Times named Griffey as the most important athlete in Seattle sports history.

On October 25, 2021, Griffey joined the Mariners ownership group, becoming the first former player to hold partnership interest in the Mariners.

=== Baseball Hall of Fame election ===
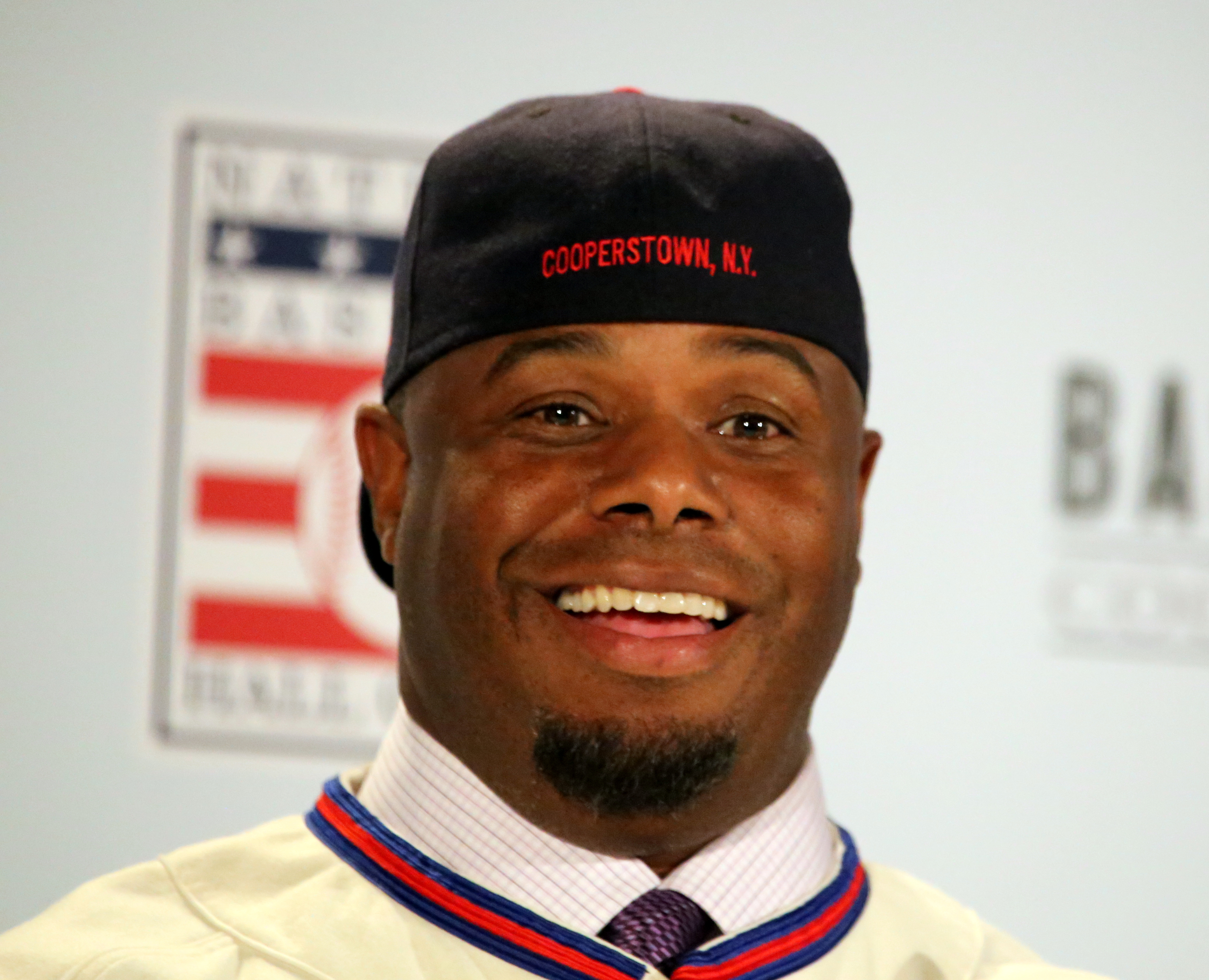
Griffey during a press conference in 2016 after his election to the National Baseball Hall of Fame

On January 6, 2016, Griffey was elected to the Baseball Hall of Fame, receiving 99.32 percent of the vote, breaking the record previously held by Tom Seaver's 98.84 percent in 1992. (Mariano Rivera later became the first unanimous inductee in 2019.) A flag bearing Griffey's number 24 was flown from Seattle's Space Needle following the announcement. Griffey is one of four Baseball Hall of Fame inductees who have been chosen first overall in an MLB draft. The other three are Chipper Jones, who was inducted in 2018, Harold Baines, who was inducted by the Veterans Committee in 2019, and Joe Mauer, who was inducted in 2024.

Coinciding with his Hall of Fame election, the Mariners announced on January 8, 2016, that they would retire his jersey number 24. The retirement took effect with the start of the 2016 MLB season, with the formal ceremony taking place prior to the Mariners' August 6 game. The jersey retirement includes the number 24 also being taken out of circulation of all of the Mariners minor league affiliates.

The Mariners also honored Griffey in a unique fashion in the 2016 MLB draft, selecting his son Trey in the 24th round (matching his jersey number), even though Trey, at the time a wide receiver at the University of Arizona, had not played baseball since his preteen years.

On July 29, 2021, Griffey was elected to the Baseball Hall of Fame's Board of Directors.

As of 2021, Griffey is also working as a senior adviser to MLB Commissioner Rob Manfred.

== Philanthropy ==
In 2008, Griffey released a series of charity wines to support The Ken Griffey Jr. Family Foundation, a fund that supports several causes, including the Boys & Girls Clubs of America and several children's hospitals across the United States. He is also an honorary co-chairman of the AOPA Foundation's Hat in the Ring Society, a charitable organization that promotes aviation safety and education.

== Film and television ==
Television
Year	Title	Role	Notes
1991	Harry and the Hendersons	Himself	Episode: "The Father-Son Game"
1992	The Simpsons	Himself	Episode: "Homer at the Bat"
1994	The Fresh Prince of Bel-Air	Himself	Episode: "Love Hurts"
1994	Little Big League	Himself	With The "Seattle Mariners"
2001	Summer Catch	Himself	With The "Cincinnati Reds"
2015	"Downtown" – music video by Macklemore & Ryan Lewis feat. Eric Nally, Melle Mel, Kool Moe Dee, and Grandmaster Caz	Himself	Won Best Video at the 2015 MTV Europe Music Awards
2020	Superintelligence	Himself	

== Personal life ==
In April 2007, Griffey was diagnosed with pleurisy, an inflammation of the lining of the cavity surrounding the lungs which can cause painful respiration and other symptoms.

Griffey and his wife Melissa have three children: Ken Griffey III (Trey), daughter Taryn Kennedy, and son Tevin Kendall. Trey was a wide receiver in the National Football League (NFL) (2017–2019). Taryn attended the University of Arizona and played for the women's basketball team.

The Griffey family resides in Windermere, Florida, where Ken Griffey Sr. also lives.

Griffey was named an American Public Diplomacy Envoy by Secretary of State Condoleezza Rice on November 18, 2008.

Griffey has a private pilot certificate and owns a Cirrus SR22.

Since 2015, Griffey has worked as a sports photographer, and has been credentialed to shoot MLB, MLS, NFL, and IndyCar events and the 2025 Masters Tournament.

The video game MLB The Show 17 includes Griffey as the cover athlete for the American version of the game.

The Griffey family joined as a minority owner in the Seattle Sounders FC on November 17, 2020.

On May 26, 2024, Griffey drove the pace car for the Indianapolis 500.

=== Suicide attempt ===
In January 1988, Griffey attempted suicide by swallowing 277 aspirin pills but wound up in intensive care at Providence Hospital in Mount Airy, Ohio. Griffey Jr. cited arguments with his father, depression, and anger as reasons for his attempted suicide. On his failed attempt, he said, "It seemed like everyone was yelling at me in baseball, then I came home and everyone was yelling at me there. I got depressed. I got angry. I didn't want to live." He stated that he had also previously contemplated taking his own life, but he had not acted on it until this incident. After Griffey swallowed the aspirin, his girlfriend's mother drove him to the hospital. While in intensive care, he ripped the IV from his arm in order to stop an argument between him and his father. Both Griffey and his father stated that the incident changed their relationship, and since then, there has been better understanding for both of them.

== See also ==
- Ken Griffey Jr. Presents Major League Baseball, a 1994 video game
- Ken Griffey Jr.'s Winning Run, a 1996 video game
- Major League Baseball Featuring Ken Griffey Jr., a 1998 video game
- Ken Griffey Jr.'s Slugfest, a 1999 video game
- 50 home run club
- 500 home run club
- List of Major League Baseball home run records
- List of Major League Baseball career home run leaders
- List of second-generation Major League Baseball players
- List of Major League Baseball individual streaks
- List of Major League Baseball players who played in four decades
- List of Major League Baseball career hits leaders
- List of members of the Baseball Hall of Fame
- List of Major League Baseball career doubles leaders
- List of Major League Baseball career runs scored leaders
- List of Major League Baseball career runs batted in leaders
- List of Major League Baseball annual runs batted in leaders
- List of Major League Baseball annual home run leaders
- List of Major League Baseball annual runs scored leaders
- List of Major League Baseball career stolen bases leaders
- Major League Baseball titles leaders

Preceded by Paul Molitor; Frank Thomas	American League Player of the Month; April 1990; April 1997	Succeeded by José Canseco; Frank Thomas
