= 1989 Seattle Mariners season =

1989 Seattle Mariners
- League: American League
- Division: West
- Ballpark: Kingdome
- City: Seattle, Washington
- Record: 73–89 (.451)
- Divisional place: 6th place
- Owners: George Argyros; Jeff Smulyan (August)
- General manager: Woody Woodward
- Manager: Jim Lefebvre
- Television: KSTW-TV 11
- Radio: KIRO 710 AM (Dave Niehaus, Rick Rizzs, Joe Simpson)

The 1989 Seattle Mariners season was their 13th since the franchise creation. The team finished in sixth place in the American League West division, with a record of 73–89 (.451). The Mariners were led by first-year manager Jim Lefebvre.

The season was enlivened by the arrival of 19-year-old Ken Griffey Jr., the 1st overall pick of the 1987 Major League Baseball (MLB) draft. The team traded for fellow future Hall of Famer Randy Johnson in May, sending out All-Star Mark Langston. Omar Vizquel also made his MLB debut for the Mariners, and fellow future All-Stars Edgar Martínez and Jay Buhner played limited roles for the team.

In August, owner George Argyros sold the team to Jeff Smulyan.

== Offseason ==
First-time MLB manager Jim Lefebvre was hired in November 1988, replacing interim manager Jim Snyder, who was fired in October. He would lead the team to their first winning record in the 1991 season, his final year at the helm.

- November 15, 1988: Luis DeLeón signed as a free agent with the Mariners.
- December 6: José Meléndez selected from the Pittsburgh Pirates in the Rule 5 draft.
- December 7: Jeffrey Leonard and Tom Niedenfuer signed as free agents with the Mariners.
- March 27, 1989: Steve Balboni traded to the New York Yankees for minor leaguer Dana Ridenour.
- Ken Griffey Jr. set spring training team records with 32 hits, 20 runs batted in, and 49 total bases.

== Regular season ==
=== Season standings ===
AL West
Team	W	L	Pct.	GB	Home	Road
Oakland Athletics	99	63	.611	—	54‍–‍27	45‍–‍36
Kansas City Royals	92	70	.568	7	55‍–‍26	37‍–‍44
California Angels	91	71	.562	8	52‍–‍29	39‍–‍42
Texas Rangers	83	79	.512	16	45‍–‍36	38‍–‍43
Minnesota Twins	80	82	.494	19	45‍–‍36	35‍–‍46
Seattle Mariners	73	89	.451	26	40‍–‍41	33‍–‍48
Chicago White Sox	69	92	.429	29½	35‍–‍45	34‍–‍47

=== Record vs. opponents ===
1989 American League record Sources:
Team	BAL	BOS	CAL	CWS	CLE	DET	KC	MIL	MIN	NYY	OAK	SEA	TEX	TOR
Baltimore	—	6–7	6–6	6–6	7–6	10–3	6–6	7–6	4–8	8–5	5–7	6–6	9–3	7–6
Boston	7–6	—	4–8	7–5	8–5	11–2	4–8	6–7	6–6	7–6	7–5	5–7	6–6	5–8
California	6–6	8–4	—	8–5	5–7	11–1	4–9	7–5	11–2	6–6	5–8	7–6	6–7	7–5
Chicago	6–6	5–7	5–8	—	7–5	4–8	6–7	10–2	5–8	5–6	5–8	7–6	3–10	1–11
Cleveland	6–7	5–8	7–5	5–7	—	5–8	8–4	3–10	5–7	9–4	2–10	6–6	7–5	5–8
Detroit	3–10	2–11	1–11	8–4	8–5	—	6–6	6–7	5–7	6–7	4–8	4–8	4–8	2–11
Kansas City	6–6	8–4	9–4	7–6	4–8	6–6	—	8–4	7–6	6–6	7–6	9–4	8–5	7–5
Milwaukee	6–7	7–6	5–7	2–10	10–3	7–6	4–8	—	9–3	8–5	5–7	7–5	5–7	6–7
Minnesota	8–4	6–6	2–11	8–5	7–5	7–5	6–7	3–9	—	6–6	6–7	7–6	5–8	9–3
New York	5–8	6–7	6–6	6–5	4–9	7–6	6–6	5–8	6–6	—	3–9	8–4	5–7	7–6
Oakland	7–5	5–7	8–5	8–5	10–2	8–4	6–7	7–5	7–6	9–3	—	9–4	8–5	7–5
Seattle	6–6	7–5	6–7	6–7	6–6	8–4	4–9	5–7	6–7	4–8	4–9	—	6–7	5–7
Texas	3–9	6–6	7–6	10–3	5–7	8–4	5–8	7–5	8–5	7–5	5–8	7–6	—	5–7
Toronto	6–7	8–5	5–7	11–1	8–5	11–2	5–7	7–6	3–9	6–7	5–7	7–5	7–5	—

=== Season summary ===
- Ken Griffey Jr. made his MLB debut on opening day, April 3, against the defending American League (AL) champion Oakland Athletics. Griffey hit a double in his first at-bat. During the season, Griffey was selected as card number one in the 1989 Upper Deck baseball card set. Griffey was named the AL Player of the Week within a month. In May, a Seattle-area trading card company released a Griffey chocolate bar.
- The Mariners lost their first four games of the season and never rose above fifth place in the AL West. They reached their highest winning percentage on May 16, beating the Milwaukee Brewers on Griffey's first pinch-hit home run, reaching a 21–18 record.
- Griffey hit his first inside-the-park home run on May 21 on a ball that caromed off Roberto Kelly of the New York Yankees.
- Jeffrey Leonard represented the Mariners in the All-Star Game.
- Owner George Argyros sold the team in August to a group headed by Indianapolis communications executive Jeff Smulyan for an estimated $75 million (equivalent to $194.8 million in 2025). Argyros had been trying to sell the team since 1987. In June 1989, the Argyros-led Mariners pulled their advertising from Seattle radio station KZOK in response to a parody song co-written by Jimmy Kimmel criticizing Argyros.
- The Mariners endured a 12-game losing streak in August, which tied a franchise record and matched the Detroit Tigers, who also lost 12 in a row in August, for the longest in MLB that season.
- Edgar Martínez had his first career walk-off hit on September 30.
- The Mariners had the lowest payroll in the majors in 1989, at $7.6 million, equivalent to $49.3 million in 2025.
- Second baseman Harold Reynolds won a Gold Glove Award. Griffey finished third in Rookie of the Year voting.
- Closer Mike Schooler had 33 saves, a franchise record broken by Kazuhiro Sasaki in 2000.

==== Notable transactions ====
- April 21, 1989: Rey Quiñones and Bill Wilkinson to the Pittsburgh Pirates for Mike Dunne, Mike Walker, and Mark Merchant.
- May 25: Mark Langston and a player to be named later were traded by the Mariners to the Montreal Expos for pitchers Randy Johnson, Brian Holman, and Gene Harris. The Mariners completed the deal by sending Mike Campbell to the Expos on July 31.
- June 5: Roger Salkeld drafted third overall by the Mariners in the 1989 MLB draft. Seattle drafted Brian Turang in the 51st round of the draft.
- June 12: Steve Trout was released by the Mariners.
- June 20: Keith Comstock signed as a free agent.

==== Major league debuts ====
- Batters:
  - Ken Griffey Jr. and Omar Vizquel (April 3)
- Pitchers:
  - Clint Zavaras (June 3)

== 1989 roster ==
1989 Seattle Mariners
Roster
Pitchers: 15 Scott Bankhead; 27 Mike Campbell; 34 Keith Comstock; 52 Luis DeLeón; 25 Mike Dunne; 39 Erik Hanson; 47 Gene Harris; 36 Brian Holman; 38 Mike Jackson; 51 Randy Johnson; 12 Mark Langston; 49 Tom Niedenfuer; 48 Dennis Powell; 31 Jerry Reed; 40 Mike Schooler; 37 Julio Solano; 18 Bill Swift; 34 Steve Trout; 41 Clint Zavaras	Catchers: 9 Scott Bradley; 35 Bill McGuire; 10 Dave Valle; Infielders: 43 Dave Cochrane; 21 Alvin Davis; 23 Mario Díaz; 11 Edgar Martínez; 17 Jim Presley; 51 Rey Quiñones; 4 Harold Reynolds; 42,13 Omar Vizquel	Outfielders: 8 Greg Briley; 14 Mickey Brantley; 19 Jay Buhner; 2 Darnell Coles; 28 Henry Cotto; 29 Bruce Fields; 24 Ken Griffey Jr.; 7 Mike Kingery; Other Batters: 00 Jeffrey Leonard; 54 Jim Wilson	Manager: 5 Jim Lefebvre; Coaches: 42 Gene Clines (hitting); 6 Bob Didier (bullpen); 22 Rusty Kuntz (first base); 20 Mike Paul (pitching); 3 Bill Plummer (third base)

=== Player stats ===
= Indicates team leader

==== Batting ====
===== Starters by position =====
Note: Pos = Position; G = Games played; AB = At bats; R = Runs scored; H = Hits; HR = Home runs; RBI = Runs batted in; Avg. = Batting average; SB = Stolen bases

Pos	Player	G	AB	R	H	HR	RBI	Avg.	SB
C	Dave Valle	94	316	32	75	7	34	.237	0
1B	Alvin Davis	142	498	84	152	21	95	.305	0
2B	Harold Reynolds	153	613	87	184	0	43	.300	25
3B	Jim Presley	117	390	42	92	12	41	.236	0
SS	Omar Vizquel	143	387	45	85	1	20	.220	1
LF	Greg Briley	115	394	52	105	13	52	.266	11
CF	Ken Griffey Jr.	127	455	61	120	16	61	.264	16
RF	Darnell Coles	146	535	54	135	10	59	.252	5
DH	Jeffrey Leonard	150	566	69	144	24	93	.254	6

===== Other batters =====
Note: G = Games played; AB = At bats; H = Hits; Avg. = Batting average; HR = Home runs; RBI = Runs batted in

Player	G	AB	H	Avg.	HR	RBI
Henry Cotto	100	295	78	.264	9	33
Scott Bradley	103	270	74	.274	3	37
Jay Buhner	58	204	56	.275	9	33
Edgar Martínez	65	171	41	.240	2	20
Mickey Brantley	34	108	17	.157	0	8
Dave Cochrane	54	102	24	.235	3	7
Mike Kingery	31	76	17	.224	2	6
Mario Díaz	52	74	10	.135	1	7
Bill McGuire	14	28	5	.179	1	4
Rey Quiñones	7	19	2	.105	0	0
Jim Wilson	5	8	0	.000	0	0
Bruce Fields	3	3	1	.333	0	0

==== Pitching ====
===== Starting pitchers =====
Note: G = Games pitched; IP = Innings pitched; W = Wins; L = Losses; ERA = Earned run average; SO = Strikeouts

Player	G	IP	W	L	ERA	SO
Scott Bankhead	33	210.1	14	6	3.34	140
Brian Holman	23	159.2	8	10	3.44	82
Randy Johnson	22	131	7	9	4.40	104
Erik Hanson	17	113.1	9	5	3.18	75
Mike Dunne	15	85.1	2	9	5.27	38
Mark Langston	10	73.1	4	5	3.56	60
Clint Zavaras	10	52	1	6	5.19	31
Luis DeLeón	1	4	0	0	2.25	2

===== Other pitchers =====
Note: G = Games pitched; IP = Innings pitched; W = Wins; L = Losses; ERA = Earned run average; SO = Strikeouts

Player	G	IP	W	L	ERA	SO
Bill Swift	37	130	7	3	4.43	45
Gene Harris	10	33.1	1	4	6.48	14
Mike Campbell	5	21	1	2	7.29	6

===== Relief pitchers =====
Note: G = Games pitched; W = Wins; L = Losses; SV = Saves; ERA = Earned run average; SO = Strikeouts

Player	G	W	L	SV	ERA	SO
Mike Schooler	67	1	7	33	2.81	69
Mike Jackson	65	4	6	7	3.17	94
Jerry Reed	52	7	7	0	3.19	50
Dennis Powell	43	2	2	2	5.00	27
Keith Comstock	31	1	2	0	2.81	22
Tom Niedenfuer	25	0	3	0	6.69	15
Steve Trout	19	4	3	0	6.60	17
Julio Solano	7	0	0	0	5.59	6

== Farm system ==
Level	Team	League	Manager
AAA	Calgary Cannons	Pacific Coast League	Rich Morales
AA	Williamsport Bills	Eastern League	Jay Ward
A	San Bernardino Spirit	California League	Ralph Dick
A	Wausau Timbers	Midwest League	Tommy Jones
A-Short Season	Bellingham Mariners	Northwest League	P. J. Carey
Rookie	AZL Mariners	Arizona League	Dave Myers
