= 1990 Seattle Mariners season =

1990 Seattle Mariners
- League: American League
- Division: West
- Ballpark: Kingdome
- City: Seattle, Washington
- Record: 77–85 (.475)
- Divisional place: 5th
- Owner: Jeff Smulyan
- General manager: Woody Woodward
- Manager: Jim Lefebvre
- Television: KSTW-TV 11
- Radio: KIRO 710 AM (Dave Niehaus, Rick Rizzs, Joe Simpson)

The 1990 Seattle Mariners season was the 14th for the Seattle Mariners in Major League Baseball (MLB). Under second-year manager Jim Lefebvre, they finished fifth in the American League West at 77–85 (.475). It was the second-best record in the M's history up to that point in time; the win total was one behind the club record set in 1987. The Mariners hit six grand slams, most in MLB.

== Offseason ==
- November 13, 1989: Jeff Schaefer signed as a free agent with the Mariners.
- December 7: Pete O'Brien signed as a free agent with the Mariners.
- January 24, 1990: Jim Presley traded to the Atlanta Braves for Gary Eave and Ken Pennington.

== Regular season ==
- April 1990: Ken Griffey Jr. named the American League (AL) Player of the Month after batting .388 with five home runs.
- June 2: Randy Johnson threw a no-hitter versus the Detroit Tigers, the first for the franchise. He was also the tallest pitcher, at 6 ft 10 in (2.08 m), in MLB history to throw a no-hitter. It was the 2,101st game in Mariners history. Johnson was later named the AL Pitcher of the Month for June.
- July 10: Griffey Jr. and Johnson on the AL All-Star Game roster.
- September 14: Ken Griffey Sr. and Ken Griffey Jr. hit back-to-back home runs in the top of the first inning against the California Angels. It remains the only time in MLB history that a father and son hit consecutive home runs, as of the end of the 2025 season.
- In his first full major league season, Edgar Martínez led the team with a .302 batting average.
- Griffey Jr. and second baseman Harold Reynolds won AL Gold Glove Awards.

=== Opening Day starters ===
- Harold Reynolds, 2B
- Ken Griffey Jr., CF
- Alvin Davis, DH
- Jeffrey Leonard, RF
- Pete O'Brien, 1B
- Greg Briley, LF
- Edgar Martínez, 3B
- Dave Valle, C
- Brian Giles, SS
- Brian Holman, P

=== Season standings ===
AL West
Team	W	L	Pct.	GB	Home	Road
Oakland Athletics	103	59	.636	—	51‍–‍30	52‍–‍29
Chicago White Sox	94	68	.580	9	49‍–‍31	45‍–‍37
Texas Rangers	83	79	.512	20	47‍–‍35	36‍–‍44
California Angels	80	82	.494	23	42‍–‍39	38‍–‍43
Seattle Mariners	77	85	.475	26	38‍–‍43	39‍–‍42
Kansas City Royals	75	86	.466	27½	45‍–‍36	30‍–‍50
Minnesota Twins	74	88	.457	29	41‍–‍40	33‍–‍48

=== Record vs. opponents ===
1990 American League record Sources:
Team	BAL	BOS	CAL	CWS	CLE	DET	KC	MIL	MIN	NYY	OAK	SEA	TEX	TOR
Baltimore	—	4–9	7–5	6–6	6–7	6–7	8–3	7–6	6–6	6–7	4–8	3–9	8–4	5–8
Boston	9–4	—	7–5	6–6	9–4	8–5	4–8	5–8	4–8	9–4	4–8	8–4	5–7	10–3
California	5–7	5–7	—	5–8	7–5	5–7	7–6	7–5	9–4	6–6	4–9	5–8	8–5	7–5
Chicago	6–6	6–6	8–5	—	5–7	5–7	9–4	10–2	7–6	10–2	8–5	8–5	7–6	5–7
Cleveland	7–6	4–9	5–7	7–5	—	5–8	6–6	9–4	7–5	5–8	4–8	7–5	7–5	4–9
Detroit	7–6	5–8	7–5	7–5	8–5	—	5–7	3–10	6–6	7–6	6–6	7–5	6–6	5–8
Kansas City	3–8	8–4	6–7	4–9	6–6	7–5	—	4–8	8–5	8–4	4–9	7–6	5–8	5–7
Milwaukee	6–7	8–5	5–7	2–10	4–9	10–3	8–4	—	4–8	6–7	5–7	4–8	5–7	7–6
Minnesota	6–6	8–4	4–9	6–7	5–7	6–6	5–8	8–4	—	6–6	6–7	6–7	5–8	3–9
New York	7–6	4–9	6–6	2–10	8–5	6–7	4–8	7–6	6–6	—	0–12	9–3	3–9	5–8
Oakland	8–4	8–4	9–4	5–8	8–4	6–6	9–4	7–5	7–6	12–0	—	9–4	8–5	7–5
Seattle	9–3	4–8	8–5	5–8	5–7	5–7	6–7	8–4	7–6	3–9	4–9	—	7–6	6–6
Texas	4–8	7–5	5–8	6–7	5–7	6–6	8–5	7–5	8–5	9–3	5–8	6–7	—	7–5
Toronto	8–5	3–10	5–7	7–5	9–4	8–5	7–5	6–7	9–3	8–5	5–7	6–6	5–7	—

=== Notable transactions ===
- May 24, 1990: Traded Gary Eave to the San Francisco Giants for Russ Swan.
- June 4: 1990 MLB draft:
  - Marc Newfield was selected by the Mariners in the first round (sixth pick), and he signed on June 10, receiving a $220,000 bonus.
  - Dave Fleming selected by the Mariners in the third round.
  - Bret Boone was selected by Seattle in the fifth round, and he signed on June 8.
  - Mike Hampton selected by the Mariners in the sixth round.
- June 18: Darnell Coles was traded by the Mariners to the Detroit Tigers for Tracy Jones.
- June 19: Mario Díaz was traded by the Mariners to the New York Mets for Brian Givens.
- August 29: Ken Griffey Sr. signed as a free agent with the Mariners.
- September 18: Rick Renteria was released by the Mariners.

=== Roster ===
1990 Seattle Mariners
Roster
Pitchers: 15 Scott Bankhead; 34 Dave Burba; 45 Bryan Clark; 34 Keith Comstock; 55 Rich DeLucia; 37 Gary Eave; 23 Mike Gardiner; 39 Erik Hanson; 47 Gene Harris; 36 Brian Holman; 38 Mike Jackson; 51 Randy Johnson; 27 Brent Knackert; 42 Vance Lovelace; 53 Scott Medvin; 54 José Meléndez; 48 Dennis Powell; 31 Jerry Reed; 40 Mike Schooler; 37 Russ Swan; 18 Bill Swift; 1,30 Matt Young	Catchers: 9 Scott Bradley; 17 Matt Sinatro; 10 Dave Valle; Infielders: 7 Mike Brumley; 43 Dave Cochrane; 21 Alvin Davis; 29 Brian Giles; 11 Edgar Martínez; 14 Tino Martinez; 12 Pete O'Brien; 4 Harold Reynolds; 2,56 Jeff Schaefer; 13 Omar Vizquel	Outfielders: 8 Greg Briley; 19 Jay Buhner; 33 Darnell Coles; 28 Henry Cotto; 30 Ken Griffey; 24 Ken Griffey Jr.; 25 Tracy Jones; 00 Jeffrey Leonard	Manager: 5 Jim Lefebvre; Coaches: 16 Gene Clines (hitting); 6 Bob Didier (bullpen); 22 Rusty Kuntz (first base); 20 Mike Paul (pitching); 3 Bill Plummer (third base)

=== The Griffeys ===
- Ken Griffey Sr. joined his son (Ken Griffey Jr.) to become the first father and son to play in a MLB game together. The game was played in the Kingdome against the Kansas City Royals on August 31. The Griffeys became the first father-and-son teammates to hit back-to-back home runs on September 14.

== Player stats ==
= Indicates team leader

=== Batting ===
==== Starters by position ====
Note: Pos = Position; G = Games played; AB = At bats; H = Hits; Avg. = Batting average; HR = Home runs; RBI = Runs batted in

Pos	Player	G	AB	H	Avg.	HR	RBI
C	Dave Valle	107	308	66	.214	7	33
1B	Pete O'Brien	108	366	82	.224	5	27
2B	Harold Reynolds	160	642	162	.252	5	55
3B	Edgar Martínez	144	487	147	.302	11	49
SS	Omar Vizquel	81	255	63	.247	2	18
LF	Jeffrey Leonard	134	478	120	.251	10	75
CF	Ken Griffey Jr.	155	597	179	.300	22	80
RF	Greg Briley	125	337	83	.246	5	29
DH	Alvin Davis	140	494	140	.283	17	68

==== Other batters ====
Note: G = Games played; AB = At bats; H = Hits; Avg. = Batting average; HR = Home runs; RBI = Runs batted in

Player	G	AB	H	Avg.	HR	RBI
Henry Cotto	127	355	92	.259	4	33
Scott Bradley	101	233	52	.223	1	28
Jay Buhner	51	163	45	.276	7	33
Mike Brumley	62	147	33	.224	0	7
Jeff Schaefer	55	107	22	.206	0	6
Darnell Coles	37	107	23	.215	2	16
Brian Giles	45	95	22	.232	4	11
Tracy Jones	25	86	26	.302	2	15
Ken Griffey, Sr.	21	77	29	.377	3	18
Tino Martinez	24	68	15	.221	0	5
Matt Sinatro	30	50	15	.300	0	4
Dave Cochrane	15	20	3	.150	0	0

=== Pitching ===
==== Starting pitchers ====
Note: G = Games pitched; IP = Innings pitched; W = Wins; L = Losses; ERA = Earned run average; SO = Strikeouts

Player	G	IP	W	L	ERA	SO
Erik Hanson	33	236	18	9	3.24	211
Matt Young	34	225 1/3	8	18	3.51	176
Randy Johnson	33	219 2/3	14	11	3.65	194
Brian Holman	28	189 2/3	11	11	4.03	121
Rich DeLucia	5	36	1	2	2.00	20

==== Other pitchers ====
Note: G = Games pitched; IP = Innings pitched; W = Wins; L = Losses; ERA = Earned run average; SO = Strikeouts

Player	G	IP	W	L	ERA	SO
Bill Swift	55	128	6	4	2.39	42
Russ Swan	11	47	2	3	3.64	15
Gary Eave	8	30	0	3	4.20	16
Scott Bankhead	4	13	0	2	11.08	10
Mike Gardiner	5	12 2/3	0	2	10.66	6

==== Relief pitchers ====
Note: G = Games pitched; W = Wins; L = Losses; SV = Saves; ERA = Earned run average; SO = Strikeouts

Player	G	W	L	SV	ERA	SO
Mike Schooler	49	1	4	30	2.25	45
Mike Jackson	63	5	7	3	4.54	69
Keith Comstock	60	7	4	2	2.89	50
Gene Harris	25	1	2	0	4.74	43
Brent Knackert	24	1	1	0	6.51	28
Bryan Clark	12	2	0	0	3.27	3
Dave Burba	6	0	0	0	4.50	4
Scott Medvin	5	0	1	0	6.23	1
Vance Lovelace	5	0	0	0	3.86	1
Jerry Reed	4	0	1	0	4.91	2
José Meléndez	3	0	0	0	11.81	7
Dennis Powell	2	0	0	0	9.00	0

== Farm system ==
Level	Team	League	Manager
AAA	Calgary Cannons	Pacific Coast League	Tommy Jones
AA	Williamsport Bills	Eastern League	Rich Morales
A	San Bernardino Spirit	California League	Keith Bodie
A	Peninsula Pilots	Carolina League	Jim Nettles
A-Short Season	Bellingham Mariners	Northwest League	P. J. Carey
Rookie	AZL Mariners	Arizona League	Dave Myers
