= List of Seattle Mariners Opening Day starting pitchers =

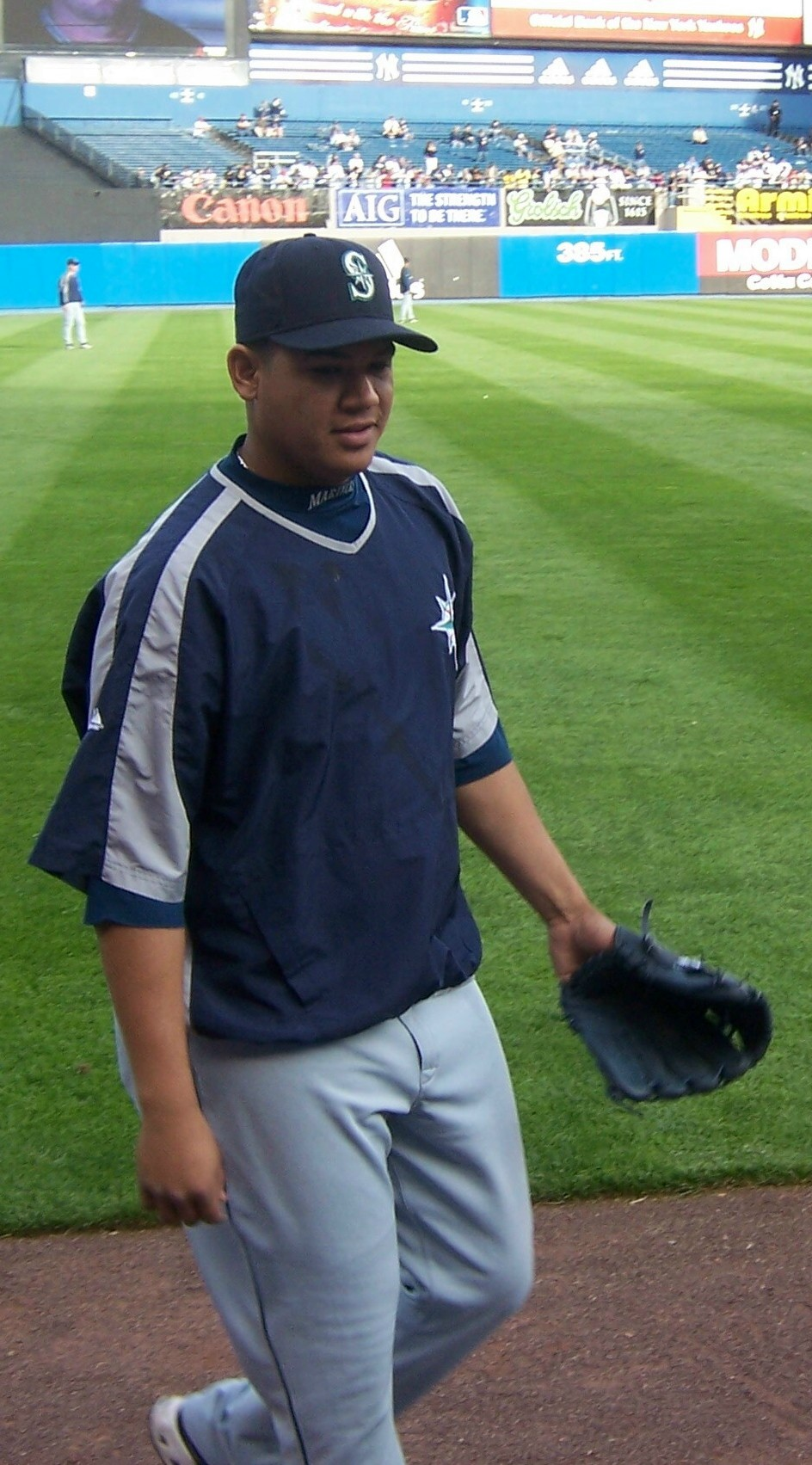
Félix Hernández, the 2007 and 2009–2018 Opening Day starter

The Seattle Mariners are a Major League Baseball (MLB) franchise based in Seattle, Washington. They play in the American League West division. The first game of each baseball season for a team is played on Opening Day. Being named the Opening Day starter is an honor, which is often given to the player who is expected to lead the pitching staff that season, though there are various strategic reasons why a team's best pitcher might not start on Opening Day. The Mariners have used 20 different Opening Day starting pitchers in their 50 seasons. The 20 starters have a combined Opening Day record of 18 wins, 15 losses, and 17 no decisions. No decisions are only awarded to the starting pitcher if the game is won or lost after the starting pitcher has left the game.

Félix Hernández has the most Opening Day starts with eleven, with a record of 7–2. Randy Johnson has the most starts in the former home ballpark of the Mariners, the Kingdome, compiling an Opening Day record of 2–0 in six starts. Hernández and Jamie Moyer have the most starts in T-Mobile Park, the Mariners' current home ballpark, with three each. Moyer has an Opening Day record of 1–2. Mark Langston has the worst winning percentage as the Opening Day starting pitcher with a record of 0–3, all of which were pitched on the road.

Overall, Mariners' starters have a record of 7–4 at the Kingdome on Opening Day, compared to a 6–4 record at Safeco Field/T-Mobile Park, making their combined home record 13–10 and their away record 7–7. The Mariners went on to play in the American League Division Series (ALDS) playoff games in 1995, 1997, 2000, 2001, 2022, and 2025. Johnson, Jeff Fassero, Moyer, Freddy García, Robbie Ray, and Logan Gilbert were the Opening Day starting pitchers those years, respectively, and had a combined Opening Day record of 3–1.

== Key ==
Season	Each year is linked to an article about that particular Mariners season.
W	Win
L	Loss
ND (W)	No decision by starting pitcher; Mariners won game
ND (L)	No decision by starting pitcher; Mariners lost game
Pitcher (#)	Number of appearances as Opening Day starter with the Mariners
*	Advanced to the postseason

== Pitchers ==
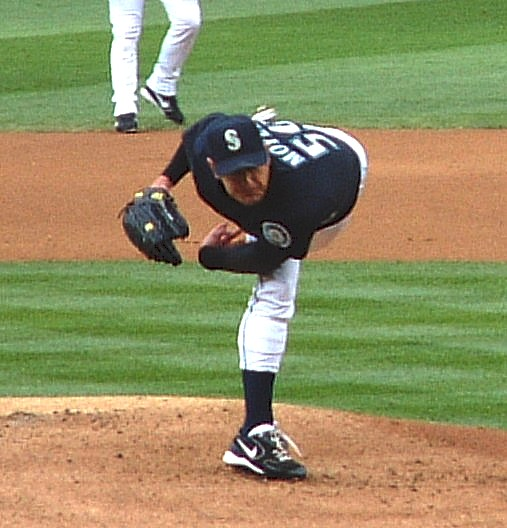
Jamie Moyer, the 2000 and 2004–2006 Opening Day starter

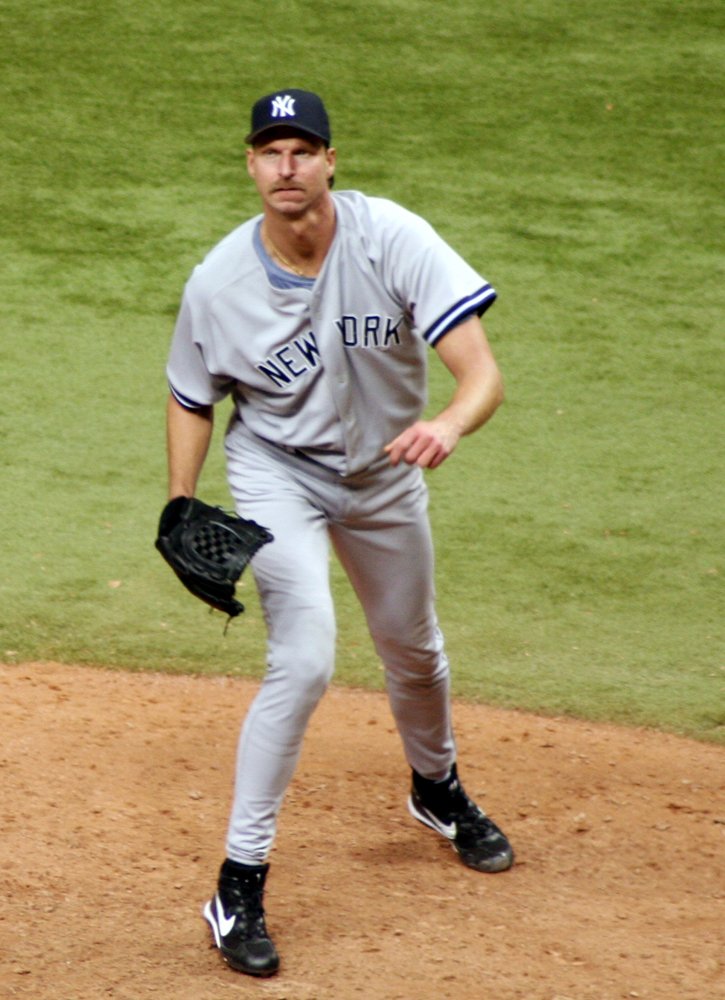
Randy Johnson, the 1992–1996 and 1998 Opening Day starter

Season	Pitcher	Decision	Opponent	Location	Ref(s)
1977	Diego Seguí	L	California Angels	Kingdome	
1978	Glenn Abbott	W	Minnesota Twins	Kingdome	
1979	Glenn Abbott (2)	ND (W)	California Angels	Kingdome	
1980	Mike Parrott	W	Toronto Blue Jays	Kingdome	
1981	Glenn Abbott (3)	L	California Angels	Kingdome	
1982	Floyd Bannister	W	Minnesota Twins	Hubert H. Humphrey Metrodome	
1983	Gaylord Perry	ND (W)	New York Yankees	Kingdome	
1984	Mike Moore	ND (W)	Toronto Blue Jays	Kingdome	
1985	Mike Moore (2)	W	Oakland Athletics	Kingdome	
1986	Mike Moore (3)	ND (W)	California Angels	Kingdome	
1987	Mark Langston	L	California Angels	Anaheim Stadium	
1988	Mark Langston (2)	L	Oakland Athletics	Oakland–Alameda County Coliseum	
1989	Mark Langston (3)	L	Oakland Athletics	Oakland–Alameda County Coliseum	
1990	Brian Holman	W	California Angels	Kingdome	
1991	Erik Hanson	L	California Angels	Kingdome	
1992	Randy Johnson	ND (L)	Texas Rangers	Kingdome	
1993	Randy Johnson (2)	W	Toronto Blue Jays	Kingdome	
1994	Randy Johnson (3)	ND (L)	Cleveland Indians	Jacobs Field	
1995*	Randy Johnson (4)	W	Detroit Tigers	Kingdome	
1996	Randy Johnson (5)	ND (W)	Chicago White Sox	Kingdome	
1997*	Jeff Fassero	W	New York Yankees	Kingdome	
1998	Randy Johnson (6)	ND (L)	Cleveland Indians	Kingdome	
1999	Jeff Fassero (2)	L	Chicago White Sox	Kingdome	
2000*	Jamie Moyer	L	Boston Red Sox	Safeco Field	
2001*	Freddy García	ND (W)	Oakland Athletics	Safeco Field	
2002	Freddy García (2)	L	Chicago White Sox	Safeco Field	
2003	Freddy García (3)	L	Oakland Athletics	Network Associates Coliseum	
2004	Jamie Moyer (2)	L	Anaheim Angels	Safeco Field	
2005	Jamie Moyer (3)	W	Minnesota Twins	Safeco Field	
2006	Jamie Moyer (4)	ND (L)	Los Angeles Angels of Anaheim	Safeco Field	
2007	Félix Hernández	W	Oakland Athletics	Safeco Field	
2008	Érik Bédard	ND (W)	Texas Rangers	Safeco Field	
2009	Félix Hernández (2)	W	Minnesota Twins	Hubert H. Humphrey Metrodome	
2010	Félix Hernández (3)	ND (W)	Oakland Athletics	Oakland–Alameda County Coliseum	
2011	Félix Hernández (4)	W	Oakland Athletics	Oakland–Alameda County Coliseum	
2012	Félix Hernández (5)	ND (W)	Oakland Athletics	Tokyo Dome	
2013	Félix Hernández (6)	W	Oakland Athletics	O.co Coliseum	
2014	Félix Hernández (7)	W	Los Angeles Angels of Anaheim	Angel Stadium	
2015	Félix Hernández (8)	W	Los Angeles Angels of Anaheim	Safeco Field	
2016	Félix Hernández (9)	L	Texas Rangers	Globe Life Park in Arlington	
2017	Félix Hernández (10)	L	Houston Astros	Minute Maid Park	
2018	Félix Hernández (11)	W	Cleveland Indians	Safeco Field	
2019	Marco Gonzales	W	Oakland Athletics	Tokyo Dome	
2020	Marco Gonzales (2)	L	Houston Astros	Minute Maid Park	
2021	Marco Gonzales (3)	ND (W)	San Francisco Giants	T-Mobile Park	
2022*	Robbie Ray	W	Minnesota Twins	Target Field	
2023	Luis Castillo	ND (W)	Cleveland Guardians	T-Mobile Park	
2024	Luis Castillo (2)	L	Boston Red Sox	T-Mobile Park	
2025*	Logan Gilbert	ND (W)	Athletics	T-Mobile Park	
2026	Logan Gilbert (2)	ND (L)	Cleveland Guardians	T-Mobile Park	

== Records by Pitcher ==
Pitchers with at least two starts
Pitcher	Num Starts	Player W–L (ND)	Team W–L
Felix Hernandez	11	7–2 (2)	9–2
Randy Johnson	6	2–0 (4)	3–3
Jamie Moyer	4	1–2 (1)	1–3
Mike Moore	3	1–0 (2)	3–0
Glenn Abbott	3	1–1 (1)	2–1
Marco Gonzales	3	1–1 (1)	2–1
Freddy Garcia	3	0–2 (1)	1–2
Mark Langston	3	0–3	0–3
Jeff Fassero	2	1–1	1–1
Logan Gilbert	2	0–0 (2)	1–1
Luis Castillo	2	0–1 (1)	1–1
