= Mark Merchant =

- Outfielder
- Born: January 23, 1969 (age 57); Dunkirk, New York, U.S.
- Bats: Switch Throws: Right
- Stats at Baseball Reference

Mark Alan Merchant (born January 23, 1969) is an American former professional baseball player whose career spanned ten seasons in minor league baseball, parts of one season in the Northern League, and one season in the Atlantic League of Professional Baseball. A highly rated prospect out of Oviedo High School, Merchant was drafted by the Pittsburgh Pirates with the second overall selection after Ken Griffey Jr. in the 1987 Major League Baseball draft. During the 1989 season, the Pirates traded Merchant to the Seattle Mariners as a part of a five-player deal.

== Early life ==
Merchant was born on January 23, 1969, in Dunkirk, New York. He attended Oviedo High School in Oviedo, Florida, where he played baseball. He was named to the all-state team his junior year. In his senior season, Merchant had a batting average of .419 with seven doubles, two triples, five home runs, and 23 runs batted in (RBI). He successfully stole 48 bases out of 49 attempts, and was again named to the all-state team. Coaches from District 7 of the Florida Athletic Coaches Association named Merchant the Florida Player of the Year. According to the Orlando Sentinel, it wasn't "uncommon" to see dozens of scouts at Oviedo's games.

For scouts, he ran the 60 yard dash in 6.6 seconds, which The Atlanta Journal-Constitution considered a good time. The newspaper also said that, outside of pitchers, he had the best throwing arm in the 1987 Major League Baseball draft. Writing for Sports Illustrated, Peter Gammons considered Merchant to be the second best prospect available, behind Ken Griffey Jr. In the draft, the Pittsburgh Pirates selected Merchant second, after the Seattle Mariners had chosen Griffey Jr. first overall. Within three hours, he signed a contract with the Pirates.

== Professional career ==
=== Pittsburgh Pirates and Seattle Mariners ===
Merchant began his professional career with the Rookie League's Gulf Coast League Pirates. For the Pirates, he batted .265 over 50 games. While with the Pirates, Merchant improved his base stealing ability by working with coach Joe Tanner. Merchant was surprised with his own success at making the transition between high school and professional baseball. In 1988, the team promoted him to the Augusta Pirates of the Class-A South Atlantic League, where he played with future MLB players Moisés Alou and Orlando Merced. Merchant's season ended when he separated his left shoulder diving for a ball. In 60 games, he had a .242 average and two home runs.

Going into the 1989 season, Augusta manager Stan Cliburn said Merchant would be the team's cleanup hitter after a strong performance in spring training. Merchant and pitcher Mike Walker were considered to be the top two prospects in the Pirates organization. After 15 games in Augusta, the Pirates traded Merchant, Walker, and Mike Dunne to the Seattle Mariners for pitcher Bill Wilkinson and shortstop Rey Quiñones. The Pirates made the trade to find a replacement for shortstop Rafael Belliard, who was struggling offensively, and to compensate for injuries. Merchant finished the season with the Class A-Advanced San Bernardino Spirit, where his batting average dropped to .210; his 66 walks and 114 strikeouts, however, both led the Spirit.

In 1990, Merchant played for both the Spirit and the Williamsport Bills of Double-A. Bone spurs in his right arm caused him to miss most of the 1990 season. When playing, his batting average of .314 was the fifth-best on the Spirit, but his average of .137 was the third-worst on the Bills. Remaining with Seattle, Merchant played for the Advanced-A Peninsula Pilots and the Double-A Jacksonville Suns in 1991. In 1992, he played solely for the Suns and led the team in strikeouts. His stolen base total had decreased from a combined 14 with the Pilots and Suns last season to just 3 in 1992. After the season, the Mariners released Merchant; after he was released, Merchant considered changing careers.

=== Cincinnati Reds ===
Electing to remain with baseball, Merchant signed a contract with the Cincinnati Reds in April 1993. He spent the majority of the season, 109 games, with the Double-A Chattanooga Lookouts, but also played in three games for the Triple-A Indianapolis Indians. Combined, Merchant batted .298 with career highs in RBI (61) and home runs (17). Merchant attributes his success to regaining his hitting form: Jacksonville coaches tried to alter it, but in Chattanooga, "nobody wanted to change anything". Prior to the 1994 season, Reds manager Davey Johnson said Merchant could have competed for a position on the MLB team if he had had experience as a first baseman or as a catcher.
