= Rey Quiñones =

Puerto Rican baseball player (born 1963)

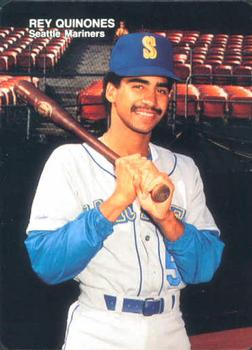
- Shortstop
- Born: November 11, 1963 (age 62); Río Piedras, Puerto Rico
- Batted: Left Threw: Right

MLB debut
- May 17, 1986, for the Boston Red Sox

Last MLB appearance
- July 21, 1989, for the Pittsburgh Pirates

MLB statistics
- Batting average: .243
- Home runs: 29
- Runs batted in: 159
- Stats at Baseball Reference

Teams
- Boston Red Sox (1986); Seattle Mariners (1986–1989); Pittsburgh Pirates (1989)

Rey Francisco Quiñones (born November 11, 1963) is a Puerto Rican former baseball shortstop who played in Major League Baseball for the Boston Red Sox, Seattle Mariners, and Pittsburgh Pirates from 1986 to 1989.

Boston signed Quiñones in 1982 as an international free agent out of Puerto Rico. He was a league All-Star in 1983, 1984, and 1985, then made his MLB debut with the Red Sox in May 1986. He hit his first MLB home run off Phil Niekro on June 4.

That August, Boston traded him (along with Mike Brown and Mike Trujillo) to the Mariners for Spike Owen and Dave Henderson. Quiñones was Seattle's primary shortstop through the end of the 1988 season. He was talented but did not always have good effort or focus. Longtime Mariners trainer Rick Griffin called him one of the most talented players he ever saw, able to throw a baseball from home plate over the center field wall, but Quiñones also benched himself from games and said he didn't need to play baseball. In 1987, Quiñones once missed a Mariners game because he was busy playing Nintendo in the clubhouse. That season he also led the American League with 25 fielding errors.

The Mariners traded Quiñones and pitcher Bill Wilkinson to the Pirates for Mike Dunne, Mike Walker, and Mark Merchant in April 1989. The Pirates released him that July, with manager Jim Leyland saying Quiñones showed poor effort defensively.

Quiñones played 451 MLB games and hit for a .243 average, with 29 home runs and 159 RBIs. He made 94 errors on defense with a below average .952 fielding percentage.

Quiñones received a World Series ring from the 1996 New York Yankees, after holding an administrative position with the team. The ring was later sold at auction.

Quiñones is married.
