= Logan Gilbert =

American baseball player (born 1997)

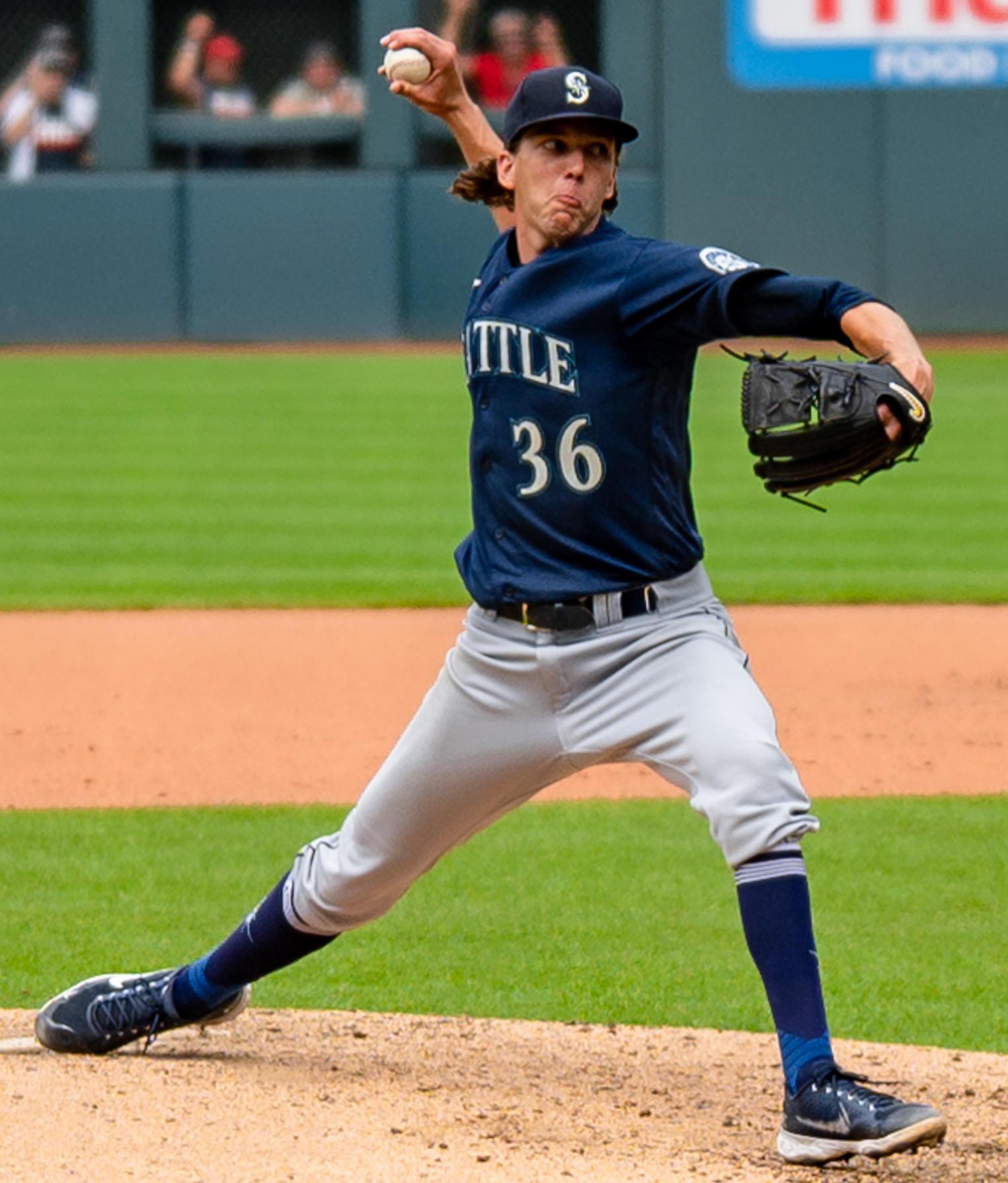
- Gilbert with the Seattle Mariners in 2021

Seattle Mariners – No. 36
- Pitcher
- Born: May 5, 1997 (age 29); Winter Park, Florida, U.S.
- Bats: Right Throws: Right

MLB debut
- May 13, 2021, for the Seattle Mariners

MLB statistics (through 2026 season)
- Win–loss record: 59-47
- Earned run average: 3.60
- Strikeouts: 1,089
- Stats at Baseball Reference

Teams
- Seattle Mariners (2021–present)

Career highlights and awards
- All-Star (2024)

Logan Keith Gilbert (born May 5, 1997) is an American professional baseball pitcher for the Seattle Mariners of Major League Baseball (MLB). He made his MLB debut in 2021 and was an All-Star in 2024.

== Amateur career ==
Gilbert attended Wekiva High School in Apopka, Florida. He pitched and played first base in high school. He was named his team MVP his senior season. He reached 90 miles per hour on his fastball in 2014 and was the 500th best high school prospect in 2015, according to Perfect Game. He was not drafted out of high school and enrolled at Stetson University to play baseball for the Stetson Hatters.

As a freshman in 2016, Gilbert appeared in 21 games with five starts, going 2–1 with a 2.74 earned run average (ERA) and 43 strikeouts in 49 innings. After his freshman season, he pitched for the Bethesda Big Train in the Cal Ripken Collegiate Baseball League, posting a 1.70 ERA with 28 strikeouts over 26 1/3 innings. As a sophomore in 2017, he appeared in 15 games with 12 starts, and went 10–0 with a 2.02 ERA and 107 strikeouts in 89 innings and was named the Atlantic Sun Conference (ASUN) Pitcher of the Year. After the 2017 season, he played collegiate summer baseball with the Orleans Firebirds of the Cape Cod Baseball League and was named a league all-star. As a junior in 2018, he pitched to an 11–2 record and a 2.72 ERA over 16 starts and was again named the ASUN Pitcher of the Year.

== Professional career ==
=== 2018–2020: draft and minor leagues ===
Gilbert was considered one of the top 20 prospects for the 2018 Major League Baseball draft. He was selected 14th overall by the Seattle Mariners. He signed for $3.88 million on June 16. He was shut down for the remainder of 2018 after contracting mononucleosis.

Gilbert made his professional debut as the 2019 Opening Day starter of the West Virginia Power. After five starts with a 1–0 record and 1.59 ERA, he was promoted to the High-A Modesto Nuts. In 12 starts with Modesto, he went 5–3 with a 1.73 ERA, striking out 73 batters over 62 1/3 innings. He was promoted to the Double-A Arkansas Travelers in July. Over nine starts with Arkansas, he pitched to a 4–2 record with a 2.88 ERA.

Gilbert did not play in an official game in 2020 due to the cancellation of the minor league season because of the COVID-19 pandemic. He pitched in an intrasquad exhibition game in Seattle in July, before the start of the MLB season. He was also on the Mariners' initial 60-man roster but stayed in the alternate training site in Tacoma.

=== 2021: MLB debut ===
Entering 2021, Gilbert was a consensus top 40 prospect. He started the season with the Tacoma Rainiers, earning a win in his only Triple-A game. On May 13, Gilbert was promoted to the major leagues and made his debut, starting against the Cleveland Indians. He took the loss, allowing four runs in four innings. On June 6, he earned his first career win, striking out seven Los Angeles Angels batters and allowing one run in five innings. In his rookie season, Gilbert was 6–5 in 24 starts, with a 4.68 ERA and 128 strikeouts in 119 2/3 innings.

=== 2022: Postseason debut ===
Gilbert was named the American League (AL) Pitcher of the Month for April 2022, in which he went 3–0 with 22 strikeouts in 20 innings. On September 30, Gilbert allowed one run in eight innings against the Oakland Athletics. His start helped the Mariners clinch a playoff spot for the first time since 2001.

Gilbert started Game 1 of the AL Division Series (ALDS), allowing three runs in 5 1/3 innings. He left with the Mariners leading, but the team lost in the bottom of the 9th inning.

In his first full MLB season, Gilbert posted a 13–6 record with a 3.20 ERA in 32 starts covering 185 2/3 innings. He gave up the third-highest percentage of line drives in the majors (28.9 percent), and balls hit against him had the second-highest average exit velocity (91 mph) among all pitchers.

=== 2023 ===
Gilbert pitched his first career shutout on July 4, 2023, striking out 7 San Francisco Giants and allowing 5 hits. That game and a subsequent win over the Houston Astros earned him the AL Player of the Week Award. He struck out 12 batters in a 2–0 win over the San Diego Padres on August 8.

Gilbert had a 13–7 record with a 3.73 ERA and 189 strikeouts in 190 2/3 innings. His 5.25 strikeout-to-walk ratio ranked third in the AL, trailing his teammate George Kirby.

=== 2024: All-Star ===
Gilbert continued to improve in 2024 and was selected for the All-Star Game. However, because he was scheduled to start two days before the game and therefore unavailable to pitch, teammate Andrés Muñoz replaced him on the All-Star Game roster. On September 8, Gilbert pitched his second career complete game, going only 8 innings in a 2–0 loss to the St. Louis Cardinals. His 10 strikeouts in that game tied his season high, also reached on August 27.

Gilbert proved durable and efficient in 2024, leading the majors with 208 2/3 innings pitched and 0.887 walks and hits per inning pitched. His 220 strikeouts ranked sixth, just 8 fewer than the MLB lead. He again ranked third the AL in strikeout-to-walk rate, trailing Kirby. He had a 9–12 record with a 3.23 ERA.

=== 2025–2026 ===
Gilbert was the Mariners Opening Day starter in 2025, allowing 1 home run and striking out 8 as the Mariners defeated the Athletics. He placed on the 15-day injured list on April 26, one day after he suffered a right elbow flexor strain while pitching against the Miami Marlins. He missed over seven weeks, returning on June 16 against the Boston Red Sox. He struck out a career-high 13 batters on August 24 against the Athletics. He finished the regular season with a 6–6 record, 3.44 ERA, and 173 strikeouts in 131 innings. He struck out 32.3 percent of batters faced, the highest rate of his career and second-most among starters, but did not pitch deep into games, finishing the seventh inning once.

Gilbert started Game 3 of the ALDS, earning a win against the Detroit Tigers. He returned on short rest to throw two innings of scoreless relief in Game 5, helping the Mariners advance to the AL Championship Series (ALCS). Again working on short rest, Gilbert started Game 2 of the ALCS against Toronto and was pulled after three innings, allowing two runs. He lost Game 6 of the series, allowing five runs in four innings. He had a 4.20 ERA over his four postseason appearances.

Gilbert was the Opening Day starter in 2026, again receiving a no-decision in the first game of the season. On July 11, 2026, Gilbert struck out Jonny DeLuca of the Tampa Bay Rays for his 1,000th career strikeout.

== Player profile ==
Gilbert's physique contributes to his pitching success. He is 6 ft 6 in (1.98 m) tall and has large hands. This combination has led him to have one of the longest extensions, meaning he releases the ball the furthest from the mound and the closest to home plate, limiting batters' reaction time.

Gilbert regularly adds new pitches to his repertoire. In 2022, he began throwing a new slider that he learned from Jacob DeGrom, which became his second most common pitch. In 2023, he began throwing a new split changeup or splitter, which replaced his changeup and became his third most frequent pitch. In 2024, he added a cutter. He threw the cutter 10 percent of the time, reducing his four-seam fastball usage. This change made his slider his most frequent pitch for the first time in his career. Gilbert's fastball averaged at least 95 miles per hour in his first four seasons in the majors. Gilbert tinkered with several of his pitches before spring training in 2025. He worked to improve his cutter and sinker before the 2026 season. He had abandoned his cutter in 2025 and rarely thrown his sinker.

Gilbert adopted an alter ego called "Walter" on days when he pitches. He said the name started as a joke in college and that "Walter" describes his increased focus and competitiveness on the mound.

== Personal life ==
Gilbert married his wife in November 2022. Their son was born after the 2025 MLB season. They have a dog. Gilbert has an older brother, who pitched in high school before suffering an elbow injury.

Gilbert is a Christian.
