= Mike Walker (pitcher, born 1965) =

American baseball player

- Pitcher
- Born: June 23, 1965 (age 60); Houston, Texas, U.S.
- Batted: Right Threw: Right

MLB debut
- June 16, 1992, for the Seattle Mariners

Last MLB appearance
- July 6, 1992, for the Seattle Mariners

MLB statistics
- Win–loss record: 0–3
- Earned run average: 7.36
- Strikeouts: 5
- Stats at Baseball Reference

Teams
- Seattle Mariners (1992)

Michael Aaron Walker (born June 23, 1965) is an American former professional baseball player. A pitcher, Walker played Major League Baseball (MLB) in 1992 with the Seattle Mariners.

Walker, was raised in Splendora/Cleveland, Texas by his parents Barbara and L.G. In high school, Walker, aka "The Walk", was an All-Star athlete who lettered in basketball and baseball. He went to the University of Houston on a scholarship and, as a pitcher, enjoyed many successes as a Cougar.

On June 2, 1986 Walker was drafted by the Pittsburgh Pirates in the 2nd round of the 1986 MLB draft. He began his minor league career with the Watertown Pirates, then moved up to play for the Single-A Salem Buccaneers in 1987, where he had a very successful season. He was named Most Valuable Player on numerous occasions and recognized as one of the Carolina League's most prestigious players during 1987, leading Salem to the league championship. Briefly, he spent time in the AA club in Harrisburg, Pennsylvania. Mike's talent brought him to the AAA club in Buffalo by the end of 1988.

In 1989, Walker married Dina (Becker) and had headed back to Buffalo, New York to once again play for the Pirates' AAA club. However, on April 21, along with minor leaguer Mark Merchant, Walker was traded to the Mariners for Rey Quiñones and Bill Wilkinson. Mike played for Seattle's Triple A farm team, the Calgary Cannons for the next few seasons. In 1992, after a short recovery from shoulder surgery, Mike was called to the major leagues. He made his MLB debut on June 16, 1992. Walker played for Seattle for just shy of one month and never spent another day in MLB.

Over the following years, Mike played for the San Francisco Giants and the Texas Rangers minor league organizations. He was a replacement player with the Pirates in spring training in 1995 during the ongoing players' strike. He played with Diablos Rojos del México in the Mexican Baseball League later that year.
