= Major League Baseball Pitcher of the Month Award =

Monthly award in Major League Baseball

- Sport: Baseball
- League: Major League Baseball
- Awarded for: Best pitcher of the month in National League and American League
- Country: United States, Canada

History
- First award: 1975 (NL); 1979 (AL)
- Most wins: Roger Clemens (15)
- Most recent: September 2026: Jared Jones (NL); Freddy Peralta (AL)

In Major League Baseball (MLB), the Pitcher of the Month Award is given monthly during the regular season to two outstanding pitchers, one each in the National League (NL) and American League (AL). The NL began awarding the honor in 1975, and the AL followed in 1979. Upon the introduction of each league's pitcher award, pitchers became ineligible for the position players' monthly award.

== Awards by month ==
Players listed with multiple occurrences are denoted by parentheses containing the ordinal.

The most Pitcher of the Month awards won by a single player is 15 by Roger Clemens. He is followed by Greg Maddux (10), Pedro Martínez (8), Randy Johnson (8), and Johan Santana (8).

Year	Month	National League		American League	
Year	Month	Player(s)	Team(s)	Player(s)	Team(s)
=== 1975 to 1979 ===
1975	April	Don Sutton	Los Angeles Dodgers		
1975	May	Don Sutton (2)	Los Angeles Dodgers		
1975	June	Tom Seaver	New York Mets		
1975	July	Al Hrabosky	St. Louis Cardinals		
1975	August	Burt Hooton	Los Angeles Dodgers		
1975	September	Burt Hooton (2)	Los Angeles Dodgers		
1976	April	Randy Jones	San Diego Padres		
1976	May	Randy Jones (2)	San Diego Padres		
1976	June	Andy Messersmith	Atlanta Braves		
1976	July	Jerry Koosman	New York Mets		
1976	August	Ray Burris	Chicago Cubs		
1976	September	Don Sutton (3)	Los Angeles Dodgers		
1977	April	Tom Seaver (2)	New York Mets		
1977	May	Bruce Sutter	Chicago Cubs		
1977	June	Rick Reuschel	Chicago Cubs		
1977	July	Rick Reuschel (2)	Chicago Cubs		
1977	August	Tom Seaver (3)	Cincinnati Reds		
1977	September	Larry Christenson	Philadelphia Phillies		
1978	April	Ross Grimsley	Montreal Expos		
1978	May	Bob Knepper	San Francisco Giants		
1978	June	Vida Blue	San Francisco Giants		
1978	July	J. R. Richard	Houston Astros		
1978	August	Kent Tekulve	Pittsburgh Pirates		
1978	September	Gaylord Perry	San Diego Padres		
1979	April	Ken Forsch	Houston Astros	Tommy John	New York Yankees
1979	May	Joe Niekro	Houston Astros	Jim Kern	Texas Rangers
1979	June	Joaquín Andújar	Houston Astros	Mark Clear	California Angels
1979	July	Dick Tidrow	Chicago Cubs	Sid Monge	Cleveland Indians
1979	August	Rick Reuschel (3)	Chicago Cubs	Rick Langford	Oakland Athletics
1979	September	J. R. Richard (2)	Houston Astros	Goose Gossage	New York Yankees
=== 1980 to 1989 ===
1980	April	J. R. Richard (3)	Houston Astros	Dave Stieb	Toronto Blue Jays
1980	May	Steve Carlton	Philadelphia Phillies	Chuck Rainey	Boston Red Sox
1980	June	Jerry Reuss	Los Angeles Dodgers	Steve Stone	Baltimore Orioles
1980	July	Pat Zachry	New York Mets	Larry Gura	Kansas City Royals
1980	August	Rick Reuschel (4)	Chicago Cubs	Bob Stanley	Boston Red Sox
1980	September	Marty Bystrom	Philadelphia Phillies	Tim Stoddard	Baltimore Orioles
1981	April	Fernando Valenzuela	Los Angeles Dodgers	Matt Keough	Oakland Athletics
1981	May	Charlie Lea	Montreal Expos	Mark Clear (2)	Boston Red Sox
1981	June	1981 Major League Baseball strike			
1981	July	1981 Major League Baseball strike			
1981	August	Rick Camp; Ed Whitson	Atlanta Braves; San Francisco Giants	Ron Guidry	New York Yankees
1981	September	Tom Seaver (4)	Cincinnati Reds	Dennis Martínez; Larry Gura (2)	Baltimore Orioles; Kansas City Royals
1982	April	Steve Rogers	Montreal Expos	Geoff Zahn	California Angels
1982	May	Dick Ruthven	Philadelphia Phillies	LaMarr Hoyt	Chicago White Sox
1982	June	Steve Howe	Los Angeles Dodgers	Jim Beattie	Seattle Mariners
1982	July	John Candelaria	Pittsburgh Pirates	Tippy Martinez	Baltimore Orioles
1982	August	Nolan Ryan	Houston Astros	Jim Palmer	Baltimore Orioles
1982	September	Joaquín Andújar (2)	St. Louis Cardinals	Rick Sutcliffe	Cleveland Indians
1983	April	Pascual Pérez	Atlanta Braves	Rick Honeycutt	Texas Rangers
1983	May	Bill Laskey	San Francisco Giants	Dave Stieb (2)	Toronto Blue Jays
1983	June	Burt Hooton (3)	Los Angeles Dodgers	Charlie Hough	Texas Rangers
1983	July	Joe Price	Cincinnati Reds	Scott McGregor	Baltimore Orioles
1983	August	Jesse Orosco	New York Mets	Jack Morris	Detroit Tigers
1983	September	John Denny	Philadelphia Phillies	Richard Dotson	Chicago White Sox
1984	April	Rick Honeycutt (2)	Los Angeles Dodgers	Jack Morris (2)	Detroit Tigers
1984	May	Nolan Ryan (2)	Houston Astros	Mike Boddicker	Baltimore Orioles
1984	June	Ron Darling	New York Mets	Charlie Hough (2)	Texas Rangers
1984	July	Orel Hershiser	Los Angeles Dodgers	Willie Hernández	Detroit Tigers
1984	August	Rick Sutcliffe (2)	Chicago Cubs	Roger Clemens	Boston Red Sox
1984	September	Dwight Gooden	New York Mets	Doyle Alexander	Toronto Blue Jays
1985	April	Fernando Valenzuela (2)	Los Angeles Dodgers	Charlie Leibrandt	Kansas City Royals
1985	May	Andy Hawkins	San Diego Padres	Dave Stieb (3)	Toronto Blue Jays
1985	June	John Tudor	St. Louis Cardinals	Jay Howell	Oakland Athletics
1985	July	Fernando Valenzuela (3)	Los Angeles Dodgers	Bret Saberhagen	Kansas City Royals
1985	August	Shane Rawley	Philadelphia Phillies	Dave Righetti	New York Yankees
1985	September	Dwight Gooden (2)	New York Mets	Charlie Leibrandt (2)	Kansas City Royals
1986	April	Dwight Gooden (3)	New York Mets	Roger Clemens (2)	Boston Red Sox
1986	May	Jeff Reardon	Montreal Expos	Don Aase	Baltimore Orioles
1986	June	Rick Rhoden	Pittsburgh Pirates	Roger Clemens (3)	Boston Red Sox
1986	July	Todd Worrell	St. Louis Cardinals	Jack Morris (3)	Detroit Tigers
1986	August	Bill Gullickson	Cincinnati Reds	Mike Witt	California Angels
1986	September	Mike Krukow	San Francisco Giants	Bruce Hurst	Boston Red Sox
1987	April	Sid Fernandez	New York Mets	Bret Saberhagen (2)	Kansas City Royals
1987	May	Steve Bedrosian	Philadelphia Phillies	Jim Clancy	Toronto Blue Jays
1987	June	Orel Hershiser (2)	Los Angeles Dodgers	Steve Ontiveros	Oakland Athletics
1987	July	Floyd Youmans	Montreal Expos	Frank Viola	Minnesota Twins
1987	August	Doug Drabek	Pittsburgh Pirates	Mark Langston	Seattle Mariners
1987	September	Pascual Pérez (2)	Montreal Expos	Doyle Alexander (2)	Detroit Tigers
1988	April	Orel Hershiser (3)	Los Angeles Dodgers	Dave Stewart	Oakland Athletics
1988	May	David Cone	New York Mets	Frank Viola (2)	Minnesota Twins
1988	June	Greg Maddux	Chicago Cubs	Mark Gubicza	Kansas City Royals
1988	July	John Franco	Cincinnati Reds	Roger Clemens (4)	Boston Red Sox
1988	August	Danny Jackson	Cincinnati Reds	Mark Langston (2)	Seattle Mariners
1988	September	Orel Hershiser (4)	Los Angeles Dodgers	Bruce Hurst (2)	Boston Red Sox
1989	April	Mark Davis	San Diego Padres	Jeff Ballard	Baltimore Orioles
1989	May	Rick Reuschel (5)	San Francisco Giants	Chuck Finley	California Angels
1989	June	Mike Scott	Houston Astros	Mark Gubicza (2)	Kansas City Royals
1989	July	Mark Langston (3)	Montreal Expos	Mike Moore	Oakland Athletics
1989	August	Tom Browning	Cincinnati Reds	Bret Saberhagen (3)	Kansas City Royals
1989	September	Tim Belcher	Los Angeles Dodgers	Bret Saberhagen (4)	Kansas City Royals
=== 1990 to 1999 ===
1990	April	John Tudor (2)	St. Louis Cardinals	Dave Stewart (2)	Oakland Athletics
1990	May	Jack Armstrong	Cincinnati Reds	Bobby Thigpen	Chicago White Sox
1990	June	Ramón Martinez	Los Angeles Dodgers	Randy Johnson	Seattle Mariners
1990	July	Danny Darwin; Doug Drabek (2)	Houston Astros; Pittsburgh Pirates	Chuck Finley (2); Bobby Witt	California Angels; Texas Rangers
1990	August	Doug Drabek (3)	Pittsburgh Pirates	Roger Clemens (5)	Boston Red Sox
1990	September	Dwight Gooden (4)	New York Mets	Dave Stewart (3)	Oakland Athletics
1991	April	Lee Smith	St. Louis Cardinals	Roger Clemens (6)	Boston Red Sox
1991	May	Tom Glavine	Atlanta Braves	Scott Erickson	Minnesota Twins
1991	June	Rob Dibble	Cincinnati Reds	Jack Morris (4)	Minnesota Twins
1991	July	Dennis Martínez (2)	Montreal Expos	Bill Krueger	Seattle Mariners
1991	August	Mitch Williams	Philadelphia Phillies	Kevin Tapani	Minnesota Twins
1991	September	Chris Nabholz	Montreal Expos	Roger Clemens (7)	Boston Red Sox
1992	April	Bill Swift	San Francisco Giants	Bill Krueger (2)	Minnesota Twins
1992	May	Mike Morgan	Chicago Cubs	Roger Clemens (8)	Boston Red Sox
1992	June	Randy Tomlin	Pittsburgh Pirates	John Smiley	Minnesota Twins
1992	July	Tom Glavine (2)	Atlanta Braves	Kevin Appier	Kansas City Royals
1992	August	Dennis Martínez (3)	Montreal Expos	Roger Clemens (9)	Boston Red Sox
1992	September	José Rijo	Cincinnati Reds	Cal Eldred	Milwaukee Brewers
1993	April	Ken Hill	Montreal Expos	Jimmy Key	New York Yankees
1993	May	Tommy Greene	Philadelphia Phillies	Danny Darwin (2)	Boston Red Sox
1993	June	Darryl Kile; Chris Hammond	Houston Astros; Florida Marlins	Rick Aguilera	Minnesota Twins
1993	July	Bill Swift (2)	San Francisco Giants	Fernando Valenzuela (4)	Baltimore Orioles
1993	August	Greg Maddux (2)	Atlanta Braves	Bill Gullickson (2)	Detroit Tigers
1993	September	John Wetteland	Montreal Expos	Wilson Álvarez	Chicago White Sox
1994	April	Bob Tewksbury	St. Louis Cardinals	Ben McDonald	Baltimore Orioles
1994	May	Doug Drabek (4)	Houston Astros	David Cone (2)	Kansas City Royals
1994	June	Bobby Muñoz	Philadelphia Phillies	Cal Eldred (2)	Milwaukee Brewers
1994	July	Bret Saberhagen (5)	New York Mets	Alex Fernandez	Chicago White Sox
1994	August	1994–95 Major League Baseball strike			
1994	September	1994–95 Major League Baseball strike			
1995	April	1994–95 Major League Baseball strike			
1995	May	Heathcliff Slocumb	Philadelphia Phillies	Kenny Rogers	Texas Rangers
1995	June	Hideo Nomo	Los Angeles Dodgers	Kevin Appier (2)	Kansas City Royals
1995	July	Greg Maddux (3)	Atlanta Braves	Tim Wakefield	Boston Red Sox
1995	August	Sid Fernandez (2)	Philadelphia Phillies	Erik Hanson	Boston Red Sox
1995	September	Greg Maddux (4)	Atlanta Braves	Norm Charlton	Seattle Mariners
1996	April	John Smoltz	Atlanta Braves	Juan Guzmán	Toronto Blue Jays
1996	May	John Smoltz (2)	Atlanta Braves	Charles Nagy	Cleveland Indians
1996	June	Jeff Fassero	Montreal Expos	Orel Hershiser (5)	Cleveland Indians
1996	July	Jeff Fassero (2)	Montreal Expos	Pat Hentgen	Toronto Blue Jays
1996	August	Kevin Brown	Florida Marlins	Pat Hentgen (2)	Toronto Blue Jays
1996	September	Hideo Nomo (2)	Los Angeles Dodgers	Charles Nagy (2)	Cleveland Indians
1997	April	Tom Glavine (3)	Atlanta Braves	Andy Pettitte	New York Yankees
1997	May	Bobby Jones	New York Mets	Roger Clemens (10)	Toronto Blue Jays
1997	June	Kent Mercker	Cincinnati Reds	Randy Johnson (2)	Seattle Mariners
1997	July	Darryl Kile (2)	Houston Astros	Chuck Finley (3); Brad Radke	Anaheim Angels; Minnesota Twins
1997	August	Pedro Martínez	Montreal Expos	Roger Clemens (11)	Toronto Blue Jays
1997	September	Jeff Shaw	Cincinnati Reds	Jeff Fassero (3)	Seattle Mariners
1998	April	Tom Glavine (4)	Atlanta Braves	Chuck Finley (4)	Anaheim Angels
1998	May	Orel Hershiser (6)	San Francisco Giants	Hideki Irabu	New York Yankees
1998	June	Greg Maddux (5)	Atlanta Braves	Bartolo Colón	Cleveland Indians
1998	July	Chan Ho Park	Los Angeles Dodgers	David Cone (3)	New York Yankees
1998	August	Randy Johnson (3)	Houston Astros	Roger Clemens (12)	Toronto Blue Jays
1998	September	Randy Johnson (4)	Houston Astros	Rick Helling	Texas Rangers
1999	April	John Smoltz (3)	Atlanta Braves	Pedro Martínez (2)	Boston Red Sox
1999	May	Curt Schilling	Philadelphia Phillies	Pedro Martínez (3)	Boston Red Sox
1999	June	Al Leiter	New York Mets	Pedro Martínez (4)	Boston Red Sox
1999	July	Randy Johnson (5)	Arizona Diamondbacks	Hideki Irabu (2)	New York Yankees
1999	August	Greg Maddux (6)	Atlanta Braves	Mariano Rivera	New York Yankees
1999	September	Denny Neagle	Cincinnati Reds	Pedro Martínez (5)	Boston Red Sox
=== 2000 to 2009 ===
2000	April	Randy Johnson (6)	Arizona Diamondbacks	Pedro Martínez (6)	Boston Red Sox
2000	May	Garrett Stephenson	St. Louis Cardinals	James Baldwin	Chicago White Sox
2000	June	Al Leiter (2)	New York Mets	Cal Eldred (3)	Chicago White Sox
2000	July	Jeff D'Amico	Milwaukee Brewers	Roger Clemens (13)	New York Yankees
2000	August	Russ Ortiz	San Francisco Giants	Steve Sparks	Detroit Tigers
2000	September	Greg Maddux (7)	Atlanta Braves	Tim Hudson	Oakland Athletics
2001	April	Wade Miller	Houston Astros	Brad Radke (2)	Minnesota Twins
2001	May	Curt Schilling (2)	Arizona Diamondbacks	Pedro Martínez (7)	Boston Red Sox
2001	June	Greg Maddux (8)	Atlanta Braves	Roger Clemens (14)	New York Yankees
2001	July	Greg Maddux (9)	Atlanta Braves	Mark Mulder	Oakland Athletics
2001	August	Javier Vázquez	Montreal Expos	Barry Zito	Oakland Athletics
2001	September	Woody Williams	St. Louis Cardinals	Barry Zito (2)	Oakland Athletics
2002	April	Randy Johnson (7)	Arizona Diamondbacks	Derek Lowe	Boston Red Sox
2002	May	Curt Schilling (3)	Arizona Diamondbacks	Bartolo Colón (2)	Cleveland Indians
2002	June	Éric Gagné	Los Angeles Dodgers	Mark Mulder (2)	Oakland Athletics
2002	July	Curt Schilling (4)	Arizona Diamondbacks	Pedro Martínez (8)	Boston Red Sox
2002	August	Roy Oswalt	Houston Astros	Cory Lidle	Oakland Athletics
2002	September	Randy Johnson (8)	Arizona Diamondbacks	Andy Pettitte (2)	New York Yankees
2003	April	Shawn Chacón	Colorado Rockies	Esteban Loaiza	Chicago White Sox
2003	May	Kevin Brown (2)	Los Angeles Dodgers	Roy Halladay	Toronto Blue Jays
2003	June	Dontrelle Willis	Florida Marlins	Freddy García	Seattle Mariners
2003	July	Liván Hernández	Montreal Expos	José Lima	Kansas City Royals
2003	August	Mark Prior	Chicago Cubs	Johan Santana	Minnesota Twins
2003	September	Mark Prior (2)	Chicago Cubs	Roy Halladay (2)	Toronto Blue Jays
2004	April	Roger Clemens (15)	Houston Astros	Kevin Brown (3)	New York Yankees
2004	May	Jason Schmidt	San Francisco Giants	Mark Buehrle	Chicago White Sox
2004	June	Carl Pavano	Florida Marlins	Mark Mulder (3)	Oakland Athletics
2004	July	Russ Ortiz (2)	Atlanta Braves	Johan Santana (2)	Minnesota Twins
2004	August	Jake Peavy	San Diego Padres	Johan Santana (3)	Minnesota Twins
2004	September	Carlos Zambrano	Chicago Cubs	Johan Santana (4)	Minnesota Twins
2005	April	Dontrelle Willis (2)	Florida Marlins	Jon Garland	Chicago White Sox
2005	May	Trevor Hoffman	San Diego Padres	Kenny Rogers (2)	Texas Rangers
2005	June	Chad Cordero	Washington Nationals	Mark Buehrle (2)	Chicago White Sox
2005	July	Andy Pettitte (3)	Houston Astros	Barry Zito (3)	Oakland Athletics
2005	August	Noah Lowry	San Francisco Giants	Bartolo Colón (3)	Los Angeles Angels
2005	September	Andy Pettitte (4)	Houston Astros	José Contreras	Chicago White Sox
2006	April	Greg Maddux (10)	Chicago Cubs	José Contreras (2)	Chicago White Sox
2006	May	Jason Schmidt (2)	San Francisco Giants	CC Sabathia	Cleveland Indians
2006	June	Chris Young	San Diego Padres	Johan Santana (5)	Minnesota Twins
2006	July	Carlos Zambrano (2)	Chicago Cubs	John Lackey	Los Angeles Angels
2006	August	Derek Lowe (2)	Los Angeles Dodgers	Esteban Loaiza (2)	Oakland Athletics
2006	September	Roy Oswalt (2)	Houston Astros	Johan Santana (6)	Minnesota Twins
2007	April	John Maine	New York Mets	Roy Halladay (3)	Toronto Blue Jays
2007	May	Jake Peavy (2)	San Diego Padres	Dan Haren	Oakland Athletics
2007	June	Ben Sheets	Milwaukee Brewers	J. J. Putz	Seattle Mariners
2007	July	Carlos Zambrano (3)	Chicago Cubs	Érik Bédard	Baltimore Orioles
2007	August	Jake Peavy (3)	San Diego Padres	Andy Pettitte (5)	New York Yankees
2007	September	Jake Peavy (4)	San Diego Padres	Fausto Carmona	Cleveland Indians
2008	April	Brandon Webb	Arizona Diamondbacks	Cliff Lee	Cleveland Indians
2008	May	Todd Wellemeyer	St. Louis Cardinals	Scott Kazmir	Tampa Bay Rays
2008	June	Dan Haren (2)	Arizona Diamondbacks	John Lackey (2)	Los Angeles Angels
2008	July	CC Sabathia (2)	Milwaukee Brewers	Jon Lester	Boston Red Sox
2008	August	CC Sabathia (3)	Milwaukee Brewers	Cliff Lee (2)	Cleveland Indians
2008	September	Johan Santana (7)	New York Mets	Jon Lester (2)	Boston Red Sox
2009	April	Johan Santana (8)	New York Mets	Zack Greinke	Kansas City Royals
2009	May	Trevor Hoffman (2)	Milwaukee Brewers	Justin Verlander	Detroit Tigers
2009	June	Tim Lincecum	San Francisco Giants	Félix Hernández	Seattle Mariners
2009	July	Wandy Rodríguez	Houston Astros	Jarrod Washburn	Seattle Mariners
2009	August	Chris Carpenter	St. Louis Cardinals	CC Sabathia (4)	New York Yankees
2009	September	Jair Jurrjens	Atlanta Braves	Félix Hernández (2)	Seattle Mariners
=== 2010 to 2019 ===
2010	April	Ubaldo Jiménez	Colorado Rockies	Francisco Liriano	Minnesota Twins
2010	May	Ubaldo Jiménez (2)	Colorado Rockies	Jon Lester (3)	Boston Red Sox
2010	June	Josh Johnson	Florida Marlins	Cliff Lee (3)	Seattle Mariners
2010	July	Roy Halladay (4)	Philadelphia Phillies	Gavin Floyd	Chicago White Sox
2010	August	Tim Hudson (2)	Atlanta Braves	Clay Buchholz	Boston Red Sox
2010	September	Derek Lowe (3)	Atlanta Braves	David Price	Tampa Bay Rays
2011	April	Josh Johnson (2)	Florida Marlins	Jered Weaver	Los Angeles Angels
2011	May	Jair Jurrjens (2)	Atlanta Braves	Jeremy Hellickson	Tampa Bay Rays
2011	June	Cliff Lee (4)	Philadelphia Phillies	Justin Verlander (2)	Detroit Tigers
2011	July	Clayton Kershaw	Los Angeles Dodgers	CC Sabathia (5)	New York Yankees
2011	August	Cliff Lee (5)	Philadelphia Phillies	Ricky Romero	Toronto Blue Jays
2011	September	Javier Vázquez (2)	Florida Marlins	Doug Fister	Detroit Tigers
2012	April	Stephen Strasburg	Washington Nationals	Jake Peavy (5)	Chicago White Sox
2012	May	Gio González	Washington Nationals	Chris Sale	Chicago White Sox
2012	June	R. A. Dickey	New York Mets	Matt Harrison	Texas Rangers
2012	July	Jordan Zimmermann	Washington Nationals	Jason Vargas	Seattle Mariners
2012	August	Kris Medlen	Atlanta Braves	Félix Hernández (3)	Seattle Mariners
2012	September	Kris Medlen (2)	Atlanta Braves	Justin Verlander (3)	Detroit Tigers
2013	April	Matt Harvey	New York Mets	Clay Buchholz (2)	Boston Red Sox
2013	May	Patrick Corbin	Arizona Diamondbacks	Jason Vargas (2)	Los Angeles Angels
2013	June	Adam Wainwright	St. Louis Cardinals	Bartolo Colón (4)	Oakland Athletics
2013	July	Clayton Kershaw (2)	Los Angeles Dodgers	Chris Archer	Tampa Bay Rays
2013	August	Zack Greinke (2)	Los Angeles Dodgers	Iván Nova	New York Yankees
2013	September	Kris Medlen (3)	Atlanta Braves	Ubaldo Jiménez (3)	Cleveland Indians
2014	April	José Fernández	Miami Marlins	Sonny Gray	Oakland Athletics
2014	May	Madison Bumgarner	San Francisco Giants	Masahiro Tanaka	New York Yankees
2014	June	Clayton Kershaw (3)	Los Angeles Dodgers	Félix Hernández (4)	Seattle Mariners
2014	July	Clayton Kershaw (4)	Los Angeles Dodgers	Sonny Gray (2)	Oakland Athletics
2014	August	Madison Bumgarner (2)	San Francisco Giants	Matt Shoemaker	Los Angeles Angels
2014	September	Adam Wainwright (2)	St. Louis Cardinals	Corey Kluber	Cleveland Indians
2015	April	Gerrit Cole	Pittsburgh Pirates	Dallas Keuchel	Houston Astros
2015	May	Max Scherzer	Washington Nationals	Dallas Keuchel (2)	Houston Astros
2015	June	Max Scherzer (2)	Washington Nationals	Chris Sale (2)	Chicago White Sox
2015	July	Clayton Kershaw (5)	Los Angeles Dodgers	Scott Kazmir (2)	Houston Astros/Oakland Athletics
2015	August	Jake Arrieta	Chicago Cubs	Dallas Keuchel (3)	Houston Astros
2015	September	Jake Arrieta (2)	Chicago Cubs	Cody Anderson	Cleveland Indians
2016	April	Jake Arrieta (3)	Chicago Cubs	Jordan Zimmermann (2)	Detroit Tigers
2016	May	Clayton Kershaw (6)	Los Angeles Dodgers	Rich Hill	Oakland Athletics
2016	June	Jon Lester (4)	Chicago Cubs	Danny Salazar	Cleveland Indians
2016	July	Stephen Strasburg (2)	Washington Nationals	Justin Verlander (4)	Detroit Tigers
2016	August	Kyle Hendricks	Chicago Cubs	Corey Kluber (2)	Cleveland Indians
2016	September	Jon Lester (5)	Chicago Cubs	Rick Porcello	Boston Red Sox
2017	April	Iván Nova (2)	Pittsburgh Pirates	Dallas Keuchel (4)	Houston Astros
2017	May	Alex Wood	Los Angeles Dodgers	Lance McCullers Jr.	Houston Astros
2017	June	Max Scherzer (3)	Washington Nationals	Corey Kluber (3)	Cleveland Indians
2017	July	Rich Hill (2)	Los Angeles Dodgers	James Paxton	Seattle Mariners
2017	August	Jake Arrieta (4)	Chicago Cubs	Corey Kluber (4)	Cleveland Indians
2017	September	Stephen Strasburg (3)	Washington Nationals	Corey Kluber (5)	Cleveland Indians
2018	April	Max Scherzer (4)	Washington Nationals	Sean Manaea	Oakland Athletics
2018	May	Max Scherzer (5)	Washington Nationals	Justin Verlander (5)	Houston Astros
2018	June	Jon Lester (6)	Chicago Cubs	Chris Sale (3)	Boston Red Sox
2018	July	Zack Greinke (3)	Arizona Diamondbacks	Chris Sale (4)	Boston Red Sox
2018	August	Cole Hamels	Chicago Cubs	Blake Snell	Tampa Bay Rays
2018	September	Germán Márquez	Colorado Rockies	Blake Snell (2)	Tampa Bay Rays
2019	April	Luis Castillo	Cincinnati Reds	Tyler Glasnow	Tampa Bay Rays
2019	May	Hyun-jin Ryu	Los Angeles Dodgers	Lucas Giolito	Chicago White Sox
2019	June	Max Scherzer (6)	Washington Nationals	Gerrit Cole (2)	Houston Astros
2019	July	Stephen Strasburg (4)	Washington Nationals	Gerrit Cole (3)	Houston Astros
2019	August	Jack Flaherty	St. Louis Cardinals	Mike Clevinger	Cleveland Indians
2019	September	Jack Flaherty (2)	St. Louis Cardinals	Gerrit Cole (4)	Houston Astros
=== 2020 to present ===
2020	July/August	Yu Darvish	Chicago Cubs	Shane Bieber	Cleveland Indians
2020	September	Trevor Bauer	Cincinnati Reds	Chris Bassitt	Oakland Athletics
2021	April	Jacob deGrom	New York Mets	Gerrit Cole (5)	New York Yankees
2021	May	Kevin Gausman	San Francisco Giants	Rich Hill (3)	Tampa Bay Rays
2021	June	Jacob deGrom (2)	New York Mets	Sean Manaea (2)	Oakland Athletics
2021	July	Walker Buehler	Los Angeles Dodgers	Jameson Taillon	New York Yankees
2021	August	Adam Wainwright (3)	St. Louis Cardinals	Robbie Ray	Toronto Blue Jays
2021	September	Max Fried	Atlanta Braves	Frankie Montas	Oakland Athletics
2022	April	Pablo Lopez	Miami Marlins	Logan Gilbert	Seattle Mariners
2022	May	Zack Wheeler	Philadelphia Phillies	Martín Pérez	Texas Rangers
2022	June	Sandy Alcántara	Miami Marlins	Dylan Cease	Chicago White Sox
2022	July	Merrill Kelly	Arizona Diamondbacks	Dylan Cease (2)	Chicago White Sox
2022	August	Zac Gallen	Arizona Diamondbacks	Drew Rasmussen	Tampa Bay Rays
2022	September	Yu Darvish (2)	San Diego Padres	Alek Manoah	Toronto Blue Jays
2023	April	Clayton Kershaw (7)	Los Angeles Dodgers	Gerrit Cole (6)	New York Yankees
2023	May	Michael Wacha	San Diego Padres	Nathan Eovaldi	Texas Rangers
2023	June	Blake Snell (3)	San Diego Padres	James Paxton (2)	Boston Red Sox
2023	July	Corbin Burnes	Milwaukee Brewers	Tyler Glasnow (2)	Tampa Bay Rays
2023	August	Freddy Peralta	Milwaukee Brewers	Cole Ragans	Kansas City Royals
2023	September	Blake Snell (4)	San Diego Padres	Tarik Skubal	Detroit Tigers
2024	April	Ranger Suárez	Philadelphia Phillies	José Berríos	Toronto Blue Jays
2024	May	Chris Sale (5)	Atlanta Braves	Luis Gil	New York Yankees
2024	June	Cristopher Sánchez	Philadelphia Phillies	Garrett Crochet	Chicago White Sox
2024	July	Dylan Cease (3)	San Diego Padres	Taj Bradley	Tampa Bay Rays
2024	August	Blake Snell (5)	San Francisco Giants	Bowden Francis	Toronto Blue Jays
2024	September	Nick Martinez	Cincinnati Reds	Corbin Burnes (2)	Baltimore Orioles
2025	April	Yoshinobu Yamamoto	Los Angeles Dodgers	Max Fried (2)	New York Yankees
2025	May	Robbie Ray (2)	San Francisco Giants	Kris Bubic	Kansas City Royals
2025	June	Zack Wheeler (2)	Philadelphia Phillies	Hunter Brown	Houston Astros
2025	July	Paul Skenes	Pittsburgh Pirates	Nathan Eovaldi (2)	Texas Rangers
2025	August	Freddy Peralta (2)	Milwaukee Brewers	Trevor Rogers	Baltimore Orioles
2025	September	Yoshinobu Yamamoto (2)	Los Angeles Dodgers	Max Fried (3)	New York Yankees
2026	April	Shohei Ohtani	Los Angeles Dodgers	José Soriano	Los Angeles Angels
2026	May	Cristopher Sánchez (2)	Philadelphia Phillies	Spencer Arrighetti	Houston Astros
2026	June	Logan Webb	San Francisco Giants	Drew Rasmussen (2)	Tampa Bay Rays
2026	July	Chris Sale (6)	Atlanta Braves	Dylan Cease (4)	Toronto Blue Jays
2026	August	Jesús Luzardo	Philadelphia Phillies	Noah Cameron	Kansas City Royals
2026	September	Jared Jones	Pittsburgh Pirates	Freddy Peralta (3)	Tampa Bay Rays

== See also ==
- Baseball awards § Monthly and weekly awards
- List of Major League Baseball awards
