= Brian Holman =

American baseball player (born 1965)

- Pitcher
- Born: January 25, 1965 (age 61); Denver, Colorado, U.S.
- Batted: Right Threw: Right

MLB debut
- June 25, 1988, for the Montreal Expos

Last MLB appearance
- September 22, 1991, for the Seattle Mariners

MLB statistics
- Win–loss record: 37–45
- Earned run average: 3.71
- Strikeouts: 392
- Stats at Baseball Reference

Teams
- Montreal Expos (1988–1989); Seattle Mariners (1989–1991)

Brian Scott Holman (born January 25, 1965) is an American former professional baseball pitcher. He pitched in Major League Baseball for the Montreal Expos and Seattle Mariners from 1988 to 1991.

== Amateur career ==
Holman started his high school baseball career at Aurora Hinkley High School in Aurora, Colorado. He earned “All Centennial League” First Team Pitcher honors and was selected to the Colorado Division AAA “All State” High School Baseball Team.

In 1982, Holman moved to Wichita, Kansas and attended Wichita North High School. As a senior, he was named a high school All-American.

== Professional career ==
The Montreal Expos selected Holman in the first round of the 1983 MLB draft with the 16th overall selection. He decided to forgo a college baseball scholarship to the University of Nebraska to play professionally.

While in the Montreal minor league system, Holman earned the Expos' organizational “Player of the Month” three times. He was named to the Double-A and Triple-A All-Star teams and in 1987 was named an “All Star” for all of Double-A baseball and The Sporting News Southern League Pitcher of the Year.

Holman made his major league debut with Montreal on June 25, 1988 against the Pittsburgh Pirates. On June 30, he recorded his first MLB win with a five-hit complete game shutout against Tom Glavine and the Atlanta Braves.

The Expos traded Holman along with Randy Johnson and Gene Harris on May 25, 1989 to the Seattle Mariners for Mark Langston and a player to be named later, later identified as Mike Campbell.

On April 9, 1990, Holman was the Mariners Opening Night starting pitcher against the California Angels and recorded the win with a 7–4 victory. Eleven days later on April 20, at Oakland, he retired the first 26 batters he faced; Ken Phelps' home run beyond right fielder Henry Cotto turned his near-perfect game into the fourth one-hitter in Mariners history. Holman was named the American League (AL) Player of the Week following that performance, sharing the award with teammate Ken Griffey Jr. Holman's season ended early, as he underwent arthroscopic surgery to remove bone chips in his elbow on September 11.

In 1991, Holman tied for second in the AL with 3 shutouts and led the Mariners with 5 complete games. However, his playing career was cut short by arm injuries, not pitching in a regular season game after right rotator cuff surgery in October 1991. He pitched in spring training in 1993, and the Cincinnati Reds claimed him off waivers that October. He pitched for the Reds' Florida Instructional League team that fall and in spring training in 1994. Cincinnati released him during the season and he retired that June.

== Post-playing career ==
After retiring, Holman worked for a charitable organization, Alistar Institute, that supported orphanages and microcredit lending. He got the job on a recommendation from teammate Dave Valle.

In 2007, Holman was inducted into the Kansas Baseball Hall of Fame.

In 2017, Holman became a coach at Texas Edge North Baseball Academy in Fort Worth, Texas. He is also a player adviser/representative for Baseball Management Services. He previously coached baseball at Andale High School in Andale, Kansas. Holman has been a motivational speaker. He has also worked for financial services firm Ronald Blue & Co.

== Personal life ==
Holman's brother Brad Holman and stepfather Dick LeMay also pitched in MLB. His son David was drafted twice by the Mariners, signing with the team in 2011, and pitched in the minor leagues through 2019.

Holman is married and has 4 children. Their son David had a tumor in his brain removed as a child. Their daughter Kassidy died of leukemia in 2006. Their family moved to Ellensburg, Washington in 1998, then moved to Kansas in 2005, and later moved to Texas.

Preceded by Mark Langston	Opening Day starting pitcher for the Seattle Mariners; 1990	Succeeded by Erik Hanson
