= Clint Zavaras =

Greek baseball player (born 1967)

- Pitcher
- Born: January 4, 1967 (age 59); Denver, Colorado, U.S.
- Batted: Right Threw: Right

MLB debut
- June 3, 1989, for the Seattle Mariners

Last MLB appearance
- September 24, 1989, for the Seattle Mariners

MLB statistics
- Win–loss record: 1–6
- Earned run average: 5.19
- Strikeouts: 31
- Stats at Baseball Reference

Teams
- Seattle Mariners (1989)

Clinton Wayne Zavaras (born January 4, 1967) is an American former professional baseball pitcher. He started 10 games in Major League Baseball (MLB) for the Seattle Mariners in 1989. He also started two games for the Greece national team in the 2004 Summer Olympics.

Zavaras graduated from Mullen High School in Denver in 1985. The Mariners selected him in the third round of the 1985 MLB draft. On June 3, 1989, he made his MLB debut against Hall of Famer Nolan Ryan and the Texas Rangers. Zavaras took the loss, giving up 4 runs in 8 innings, while Ryan threw a one-hitter for a 6–1 victory. He earned his only MLB win after throwing 5 scoreless innings against the Oakland Athletics on August 7. In 10 starts, he went 1–6 with a 5.19 earned run average (ERA).

Zavaras did not return to the majors. He missed the 1990 season, undergoing two shoulder surgeries. He started 1991 on the disabled list, pitching in Single-A and Double-A. He started on Triple-A in1992, allowing 20 earned runs in 13 2/3 innings pitched, then went 3–11 after being demoted to Double-A. He signed with the expansion Colorado Rockies in November 1992, pitching in six Triple-A games in 1993. He returned to the Mariners minor league system in 1994.

Zavaras, whose paternal grandfather was Greek, pitched for the Greece national team in the 2004 Olympic Games in Athens. He allowed six runs in a loss to the Netherlands. He started two games, going 0–1 with an 11.13 ERA in 5 2/3 innings.

Zavaras owns and operates a baseball school in Lakewood, Colorado.
