= Mike Dunne (baseball) =

American baseball player (born 1962)

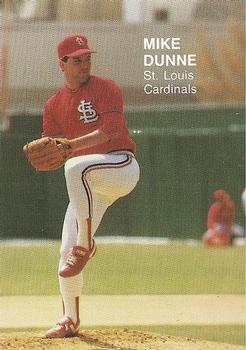
- Pitcher
- Born: October 27, 1962 (age 63); South Bend, Indiana, U.S.
- Batted: Right Threw: Right

MLB debut
- June 5, 1987, for the Pittsburgh Pirates

Last MLB appearance
- October 3, 1992, for the Chicago White Sox

MLB statistics
- Win–loss record: 25–30
- Earned run average: 4.08
- Strikeouts: 205
- Stats at Baseball Reference

Teams
- Pittsburgh Pirates (1987–1989); Seattle Mariners (1989); San Diego Padres (1990); Chicago White Sox (1992)
Medals
Men's baseball
Representing United States
Olympic Games
Silver medal – second place	1984 Los Angeles	Team

Michael Dennis Dunne (born October 27, 1962) is an American former professional baseball player who pitched in the Major League Baseball (MLB) from 1987–1990 and in 1992. He was a member of the 1984 U.S. Olympic Baseball Team.

== Career ==
Dunne played baseball at Limestone Community High School and Bradley University. He was named 1984 Missouri Valley Conference Player of the Year and graduated from Bradley with a Bachelor in Science in 1985.

As part of the U.S. team in baseball at the 1984 Los Angeles Olympics, he pitched two innings against Italy; the U.S. won the game, 16–1.

On June 4, 1984, he was drafted by the St. Louis Cardinals in the first round with the seventh overall pick of the 1984 Major League Baseball draft and signed with them. He was traded to the Pittsburgh Pirates along with outfielder Andy Van Slyke and catcher Mike LaValliere for catcher Tony Peña on April 1, 1987, before he pitched in a big league game for the Redbirds. He made his major league debut on June 5, 1987, starting against Dwight Gooden of the New York Mets . It was Gooden's first start of the year after spending the first month of the season at Smithers Drug Rehabilitation Center after testing positive for cocaine during spring training. Gooden received a standing ovation by the Mets fans. Mike Dunne pitched effectively (one earned run in six innings) but took the loss in a 5-1 Met victory. Dunne would win his next three starts and held a record of 3–1 with a 1.09 ERA. Despite the late start, he finished runner up in the Rookie of the Year vote to Benito Santiago of the san Diego Padres who hit.300 for the year including a rookie record 34 game hitting streak.

Dunne had a fine rookie season with the Pirates, going 13–6 with a 3.03 ERA and allowing just 143 hits in 164 innings. He finished second in the National League Rookie of the Year voting to Benito Santiago. On April 21, 1989, he was traded by Pittsburgh with minor leaguer Mark Merchant and Mike Walker to the Seattle Mariners for Rey Quiñones and Bill Wilkinson.

Injuries hampered much of the rest of his career. He pitched for the San Diego Padres and the Chicago White Sox. His last big league game was in 1992 for the White Sox.

Dunne's big league career covered five years and he finished with a 25–30 record and a 4.08 ERA. He pitched in 85 games, 76 of them as a starter, allowed 471 hits in 474 innings, fanned 205 and walked 225.

== Post-playing career ==
Dunne became a coach at Bradley University in 2000 and has also coached youth baseball and basketball. He has also coached at Richwoods High School in Peoria.

Dunne's son played college baseball for the Missouri State Bears.
