= Gary Eave =

American baseball player (born 1963)

- Pitcher
- Born: July 22, 1963 (age 62); Monroe, Louisiana, U.S.
- Batted: Right Threw: Right

MLB debut
- April 12, 1988, for the Atlanta Braves

Last MLB appearance
- May 15, 1990, for the Seattle Mariners

MLB statistics
- Win–loss record: 2–3
- Earned run average: 3.56
- Strikeouts: 25
- Stats at Baseball Reference

Teams
- Atlanta Braves (1988–1989); Seattle Mariners (1990)

Gary Louis Eave (born July 22, 1963) is an American former professional pitcher for the Atlanta Braves (1988–1989) and Seattle Mariners (1990). He later pitched in the Mexican League in 1992 and 1993 and the Chinese Professional Baseball League in 1993.

== Amateur career ==
Eave played two years of Division I NCAA baseball for the Grambling State Tigers where he had an 18–6 win–loss record. He gave up no home runs and struck out 157 batters in his 172 2/3 innings with the Tigers.

== Professional career ==
=== Atlanta Braves ===
The Atlanta Braves drafted Eave in the 12th round of the 1985 MLB draft. He then joined the Gulf Coast Braves, where he played 3 games before being moved up to the Sumter Braves, a Single-A team in 1986. In 1988, Eave played his first MLB season with the Braves. His first game was against the Houston Astros, who had Nolan Ryan on the mound. Eave pitched the final two innings of this game, an 8–3 loss. Eave pitched 5 innings in 5 games in his first MLB season. In 1989, Eave started three games for Atlanta, going 2–0 with a 1.31 ERA.

=== Seattle Mariners ===
Atlanta traded Eave and infielder Ken Pennington to the Seattle Mariners on January 24, 1990 for Jim Presley. After being traded to the Mariners, Eave spent some time playing for the Triple-A Calgary Cannons, with a 3–3 record and a 7.82 earned run average (ERA). With the Mariners, he had a 0–3 record and 4.20.

=== Later career ===
The Mariners traded Eave to the San Francisco Giants for Russ Swan on May 24, 1990. Eave finished the season with the Triple-A Phoenix Firebirds. He then returned to the Mariners organization, splitting the 1991 season between bounced around between Double-A and Triple-A.

Eave played in the Mexican League in 1992 and 1993, playing for Leones de Yucatán in 1992 and Acereros de Monclova in 1992 and 1993. He also pitched for the China Times Eagles in the Chinese Professional Baseball League in Pingtun, Taiwan in 1993, going 5–2 with a 5.02 ERA in 16 games.

In 1995, Eave was a replacement player with the Kansas City Royals in spring training during the ongoing players' strike. After the strike ended, he pitched for the independent Corpus Christi Barracudas in the Texas-Louisiana League that year. In 1998, he returned to that league, pitching for the Bayou Bullfrogs.

== Personal life ==
Eave met his wife, Kathy Grimm, in a class at Grambling in 1982. Together, they had three children. Shortly after his wife's death in 2024, Eave re-enrolled at Grambling. He earned his Bachelor of Arts degree in general studies in December 2025.
