= Erik Hanson (baseball) =

American baseball player (born 1965)

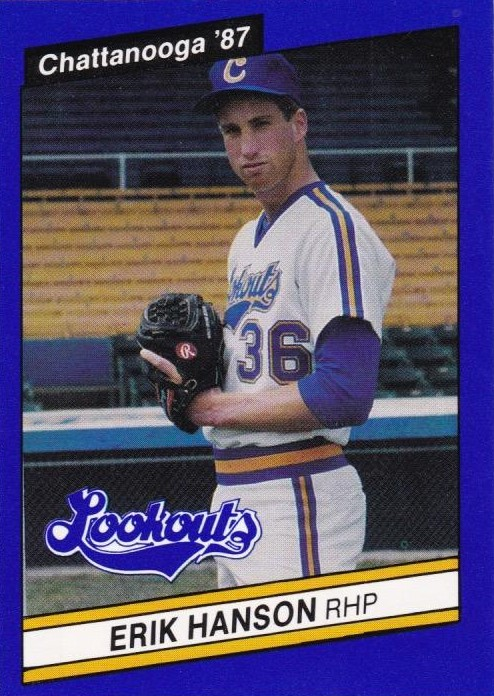
- Pitcher
- Born: May 18, 1965 (age 61); Kinnelon, New Jersey, U.S.
- Batted: Right Threw: Right

MLB debut
- September 5, 1988, for the Seattle Mariners

Last MLB appearance
- June 8, 1998, for the Toronto Blue Jays

MLB statistics
- Win–loss record: 89–84
- Earned run average: 4.15
- Strikeouts: 1,175
- Stats at Baseball Reference

Teams
- Seattle Mariners (1988–1993); Cincinnati Reds (1994); Boston Red Sox (1995); Toronto Blue Jays (1996–1998)

Career highlights and awards
- All-Star (1995)

Erik Brian Hanson (born May 18, 1965) is an American former Major League Baseball pitcher. During an 11-year baseball career, he pitched for the Seattle Mariners (1988–1993), Cincinnati Reds (1994), Boston Red Sox (1995), and Toronto Blue Jays (1996–1998) and was known for throwing an excellent curveball. He was an All-Star in 1995.

== Amateur career ==
Raised in Kinnelon, New Jersey, Hanson excelled at soccer and basketball at Peddie School in Hightstown, New Jersey, while playing junior varsity baseball in his freshman year before playing golf the following semester. Missing baseball, he came back and played summer baseball after his sophomore year, which also saw him get a growth spurt that saw him graduate at 6'5”, after starting high school at 5'6”. Hanson played high school baseball for coach Lew Watts. Eschewing being drafted by the Montreal Expos as a teenager, he attended Wake Forest University, majoring in economics. In 1984, he played collegiate summer baseball with the Orleans Cardinals of the Cape Cod Baseball League. In 1985, he was an All-Atlantic Coast Conference pitcher. That summer, he pitched for the U.S. collegiate national team, going 5–1 with a 1.41 ERA as the team competed in the Intercontinental Cup in Canada.

== Professional career ==
Hanson was drafted twice by major league teams, as the Montreal Expos drafted him in the seventh round of the 1983 MLB draft. He chose to play college baseball instead and was subsequently drafted three years later by the Seattle Mariners in the second round. He rose from Double-A ball to Triple-A by 1987 and was called up by the Mariners as a September call-up in 1988. That year, he led the Pacific Coast League with 154 strikeouts. He went back Triple-A in 1989 before rising back up to the majors. He started six games and went 2–3 with a 3.24 ERA, which included going 7 1/3 scoreless innings in his debut on September 5, allowing six hits. He went 9–5 with a 3.18 ERA in 17 games while striking out 75 with 32 walks. He excelled in 1990, going 18–9 with a 3.24 ERA and a career-high 236 innings to go with a career-best in strikeouts with 211 to 68 walks.

Hanson started on Opening Day of the 1991 season, facing the California Angels. He went 8 1/3 innings, allowed three runs on eight hits, and took the loss. That year, he went 8–8 in 27 starts with a 3.81 ERA, 143 strikeouts, and 56 walks. The following year saw him lose a league-leading 17 times as he went 8–17 on 30 starts with 112 strikeouts and 57 walks. He closed his Seattle tenure with an 11–12 record in 1993 with 163 strikeouts and 60 walks.

The Mariners traded Hanson along with Bret Boone to the Cincinnati Reds for Bobby Ayala and Dan Wilson on November 2, 1993. The Mariners dealt Hanson to avoid paying his increasing salary. In his only season with the Reds, cut short due to the strike, Hanson went 5–5 in 21 starts with a 4.11 ERA and 101 strikeouts to 23 walks in 1994. Days before the strike, he tore his anterior cruciate ligament and damaged the meniscus in his left knee while fielding a bunt from former teammate Bill Swift. During the strike, Hanson supported the players' union efforts and criticized the quality of play of replacement players.

Hanson signed a one-year, $1 million contract with the Boston Red Sox on April 11, 1995, shortly after the strike ended. He had his most decorated season, garnering his only All-Star selection. He was named the American League (AL) Pitcher of the Month for August after posting a 5–0 record, albeit with an elevated 5.01 ERA in six starts. He was unable to throw his curveball during that stretch due to an elbow injury. He finished the season with a 15–5 record, 4.24 ERA, and 139 strikeouts with 59 walks in 186 2/3 innings.

Hanson started Game 2 of the AL Division Series against the Cleveland Indians. He pitched eight innings and allowed four runs on four hits, including a home run, five strikeouts, and four walks as Cleveland won 4–0.

Hanson signed a three-year, $9.4 million contract with the Toronto Blue Jays, later viewed as one of the team's worst free agent signings. He was their Opening Day starter in 1996. Facing the Oakland Athletics, he allowed three runs on seven innings of a 9–3 victory. He went 13–17 with a 5.41 ERA in a career-high 35 starts with 156 strikeouts and 102 walks. He pitched just three games in 1997. He began the season on the disabled list (DL) with tricep fatigue. After two April starts, he went on the 60-day DL and had rotator cuff surgery performed by Dr. James Andrews. He returned to pitch once in September. He began 1998 on the DL but started eight games (with three relief appearances) for the Blue Jays, going 0–3 with a 6.24 ERA with 21 strikeouts to 29 walks, the only time he had more walks than strikeouts. He was released on June 16.

Hanson signed as a free agent with the June 25, 1998 with the Angels, starting 14 games in Triple-A. After the season, he signed with the Kansas City Royals but returned to the minors before ending his career.

== Legacy ==
In 2024, Hansom was inducted into the Wake Forest Sports Hall of Fame. In 2026, Hanson was named one of the 50 greatest Mariners players by the team.

== Personal life ==
After retiring from baseball, Hanson became competitive amateur golfer. He holds the course record at Seattle's Jackson Park golf course, as of 2015.

Preceded by Brian Holman	Opening Day starting pitcher for the Seattle Mariners; 1991	Succeeded by Randy Johnson
