= Mark Langston =

American baseball player (born 1960)

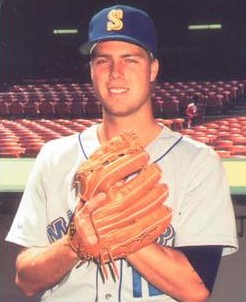
- Langston with the Seattle Mariners c. 1987
- Pitcher
- Born: August 20, 1960 (age 66); San Diego, California, U.S.
- Batted: Right Threw: Left

MLB debut
- April 7, 1984, for the Seattle Mariners

Last MLB appearance
- September 24, 1999, for the Cleveland Indians

MLB statistics
- Win–loss record: 179–158
- Earned run average: 3.97
- Strikeouts: 2,464
- Stats at Baseball Reference

Teams
- Seattle Mariners (1984–1989); Montreal Expos (1989); California / Anaheim Angels (1990–1997); San Diego Padres (1998); Cleveland Indians (1999)

Career highlights and awards
- 4× All-Star (1987, 1991–1993); 7× Gold Glove Award (1987, 1988, 1991–1995); 3× AL strikeout leader (1984, 1986, 1987); Pitched a combined no-hitter on April 11, 1990

Mark Edward Langston (born August 20, 1960) is an American former professional baseball left-handed pitcher and current radio broadcaster for the Los Angeles Angels. He played in Major League Baseball (MLB) for the Seattle Mariners (1984–1989), Montreal Expos (1989), California / Anaheim Angels (1990–1997), San Diego Padres (1998), and Cleveland Indians (1999).

During a 16-year MLB career, he compiled 179 wins, 2,464 strikeouts, and a 3.97 earned run average (ERA). He was an MLB All-Star four times, won seven Gold Glove Awards, and led the American League in strikeouts three times. He was MLB's highest paid player when he signed with the Angels.

== Playing career ==
=== Amateur career ===
Langston attended Buchser High School in Santa Clara, California. After graduating in 1978, he was selected in the 15th round (377th overall) of the 1978 MLB draft by the Chicago Cubs, who offered him $10,000 to sign with the team. However, he chose not to sign with the Cubs and attend college. In a 2018 interview, Langston told MLB.com, "I was 17 when I graduated from high school. It would have been interesting – I didn't turn 18 until August, so I don't know how I would have handled that, as a kid that's really never been anywhere. It's completely different than what these kids were exposed to in the Draft now, where they play on all these different select teams and all that. We didn't have any of that, so it would have been really my first big time away from home, and I don't know how it would have panned out."

Langston played college baseball for the at San Jose State Spartans. He was an All-Northern California Baseball Association pitcher in 1980 and a Sporting News second-team All-American in 1981. He was inducted into the San Jose Sports Hall of Fame in November 2018.

=== Seattle Mariners (1984–1989) ===
The Seattle Mariners selected him in the second round (35th overall) of the 1981 MLB draft. He was chosen as a compensation pick from the Texas Rangers for the signing of Bill Stein. He signed with the Mariners for $40,000.

Langston debuted for the Mariners in 1984 with fellow rookie Alvin Davis. He made his major league debut on April 7, 1984, allowing two earned runs in seven innings while striking out five to earn the win against the Milwaukee Brewers. After throwing his first MLB shutout on June 26 against the Chicago White Sox, he finished his rookie season with a 3.03 ERA in his final 18 starts, losing only four decisions. He finished second to Davis in American League (AL) Rookie of the Year Award voting and won the Sporting News Rookie Pitcher of the Year Award, finishing the year with a 17–10 record, a 3.40 ERA, and a league-leading 204 strikeouts in 35 games (33 starts). He also led the majors with 118 walks.

After dealing with a sore arm in his second season, Langston led the AL in strikeouts two more times while playing for the Mariners, recording 245 strikeouts in 1986, and 262 in 1987. In 1989, Langston began the season 4–5 with a 3.56 ERA in 10 starts before being traded.

=== Montreal Expos (1989) ===
After rejecting a three-year, $7.1 million contract extension, the Mariners traded Langston, their top pitcher at the time, to the Montreal Expos with pitcher Mike Campbell for pitchers Randy Johnson, Gene Harris and Brian Holman on May 25, 1989. Langston made 24 starts with the Expos, going 12–9 with a 2.39 ERA and 175 strikeouts in 176 2/3 innings. Combined between Seattle and Montreal, Langston went 16–14 with a career-low 2.74 ERA in 34 starts.

=== California / Anaheim Angels (1990–1997) ===
On December 1, 1989, Langston signed a five-year, $16 million contract with the California Angels as a free agent, making him the highest-paid player in baseball at the time. In his first start with the Angels on April 11, 1990, he pitched the first seven innings for a 2–0 combined no-hitter with Mike Witt. Witt, who had pitched a perfect game in 1984, tossed the final two frames. This combined no-hitter remained the most recent one in Angels history until Ervin Santana pitched a no-hitter on July 27, 2011.

Langston started the 1993 MLB All-Star Game for the AL, his fourth All-Star Game selection. After the season, he signed a three-year, $14 million contract extension with the Angels.

Langston was the Angels' starting pitcher for the 1995 AL West tie-breaker game against Seattle. He earned the loss, allowing five runs (four earned) on eight hits in 6 2/3 innings as the Mariners advanced to the first American League Division Series. Langston won five consecutive Gold Glove Awards with the Angels from 1991 to 1995.

=== Later MLB career and retirement (1998–1999) ===
On January 7, 1998, Langston signed a minor league contract with the San Diego Padres. He appeared in 22 games (16 starts) for the Padres, going 4–6 with a 5.86 ERA. In the World Series, Langston's 2–2 pitch to Tino Martinez appeared to be over the plate, but was called ball three by home plate umpire Rich Garcia. Langston's next pitch was hit for a grand slam in the seventh inning of Game 1 to give the New York Yankees a 9–5 lead. The Yankees swept the Padres in four games.

Langston re-signed with the Padres for the 1999 season then announced his retirement from baseball near the end of spring training. However, he soon changed his mind and signed a minor league contract with the Cleveland Indians on April 4. He went 1–2 with a 5.25 ERA in 25 games (five starts) with Cleveland. On March 20, 2000, Langston officially retired from baseball.

== Player profile ==
Noted for his pickoff move to first base, Langston's 91 career pickoffs were, at the time of his retirement, the most in MLB history. Langston is one of at least nine pitchers in MLB history to pick off at least three runners in one game, which he accomplished against the Chicago Cubs in 1989. Today, he has the fourth-most pickoffs in baseball history, behind only Kenny Rogers, Terry Mulholland and Andy Pettitte, all of them also left-handed pitchers.

Langston was named one of the 50 greatest Mariners players in August 2026. He was the first Mariner to win a Gold Glove Award, winning the first of seven career Gold Gloves in 1987. He was the franchise leader in wins and strikeouts prior to his trade to Montreal.

== Broadcasting career ==
Langston is a radio color commentator for the Los Angeles Angels and is also a co-host of the Angels post-game call-in show Angel Talk on radio station KLAA. He began working as a broadcaster in 2012.

On September 20, 2019, after announcing the starting lineups for an away game against the Houston Astros, Langston suffered from ventricular fibrillation and collapsed in the broadcast booth. He was revived and taken to a hospital, where he later had a defibrillator installed. Jose Mota took over Langston's place in the radio broadcasts. Langston returned to California on September 28 and resumed his Angels radio duties the next day.

== Personal life ==
Right after retirement as a player, Langston was the head coach for Lutheran High School of Orange County for two years.

Langston appeared as himself in an episode of Sabrina, The Teenage Witch, entitled "To Tell a Mortal", where he plays catch with Harvey.

Langston is married.

== See also ==
- List of Major League Baseball no-hitters
- List of Major League Baseball annual strikeout leaders
- List of Major League Baseball career strikeout leaders

Preceded by Ron Guidry; Mike Boddicker	American League Gold Glove Award (P); 1987–1988; 1991–1995	Succeeded by Bret Saberhagen; Mike Mussina
Preceded by Mike Moore	Opening Day starting pitcher for the Seattle Mariners; 1987–1989	Succeeded by Brian Holman
Preceded by Tom Browning	No-hit game April 11, 1990 (with Mike Witt)	Succeeded by Randy Johnson
Preceded by Kevin Brown	American League All-Star Game Starting Pitcher; 1993	Succeeded by Jimmy Key
