= Jim Presley =

American baseball player (born 1961)

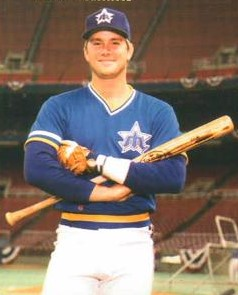
- Presley with the Mariners in 1985
- Third baseman
- Born: October 23, 1961 (age 64); Pensacola, Florida, U.S.
- Batted: Right Threw: Right

MLB debut
- June 24, 1984, for the Seattle Mariners

Last MLB appearance
- June 7, 1991, for the San Diego Padres

MLB statistics
- Batting average: .247
- Home runs: 135
- Runs batted in: 495
- Stats at Baseball Reference

Teams
- Seattle Mariners (1984–1989); Atlanta Braves (1990); San Diego Padres (1991)

Career highlights and awards
- All-Star (1986)

James Arthur Presley (born October 23, 1961) is an American former professional baseball player and coach who played as an infielder in Major League Baseball (MLB) from 1984 to 1991 with the Seattle Mariners, Atlanta Braves, and San Diego Padres

While playing for Seattle in 1986, Presley became the second player in major league history to hit two walk-off grand slams in the same season, joining Cy Williams, who had done so in 1926. That season, Presley was named to the All-Star team and hit .265 with 27 home runs and a career-high 107 RBIs. Injuries began to derail his career a couple of years later, and by 1992 he had transitioned from playing to coaching. He has been a hitting coach for the Arizona Diamondbacks, Florida Marlins, and Baltimore Orioles.

== Playing career ==
=== Amateur career ===
Presley played baseball through the Dixie Youth association, leading his team to the organization's "World Series" in 1974. He graduated from Escambia High School (EHS) in 1978.

On October 8, 2010, Presley was inducted into the EHS Sports Hall of Fame during halftime of an EHS football game along with former Dallas Cowboys Hall of Fame running back Emmitt Smith and other EHS alumni.

=== Professional career ===
The Seattle Mariners drafted Presley in the fourth round of the June MLB draft in 1979. Presley made his pro debut at the age of 17 for Seattle's Single A team, the Bellingham Mariners. Drafted as a shortstop, Presley converted to third base in the minor leagues. This improved his odds, as while Presley was having his struggles in the minors with his bat, Seattle in 1982 drafted Spike Owen in the first round of the 1982 draft and fast-tracked him to the majors. While Presley showed power, hitting more than 20 homers many times, his batting average suffered. In 1984, as a member of the Triple-A Salt Lake City Gulls, Presley had one of his best seasons as a pro, batting .317 with 13 home runs. This earned him a summertime call-up to the majors, essentially to take over third base, which was being held down by veteran Larry Milbourne. Seattle had looked at Darnell Coles for the position, but he could never stay healthy long enough. Along with shortstop Owen and power-hitting first baseman Alvin Davis, Seattle had the makings of a strong infield.

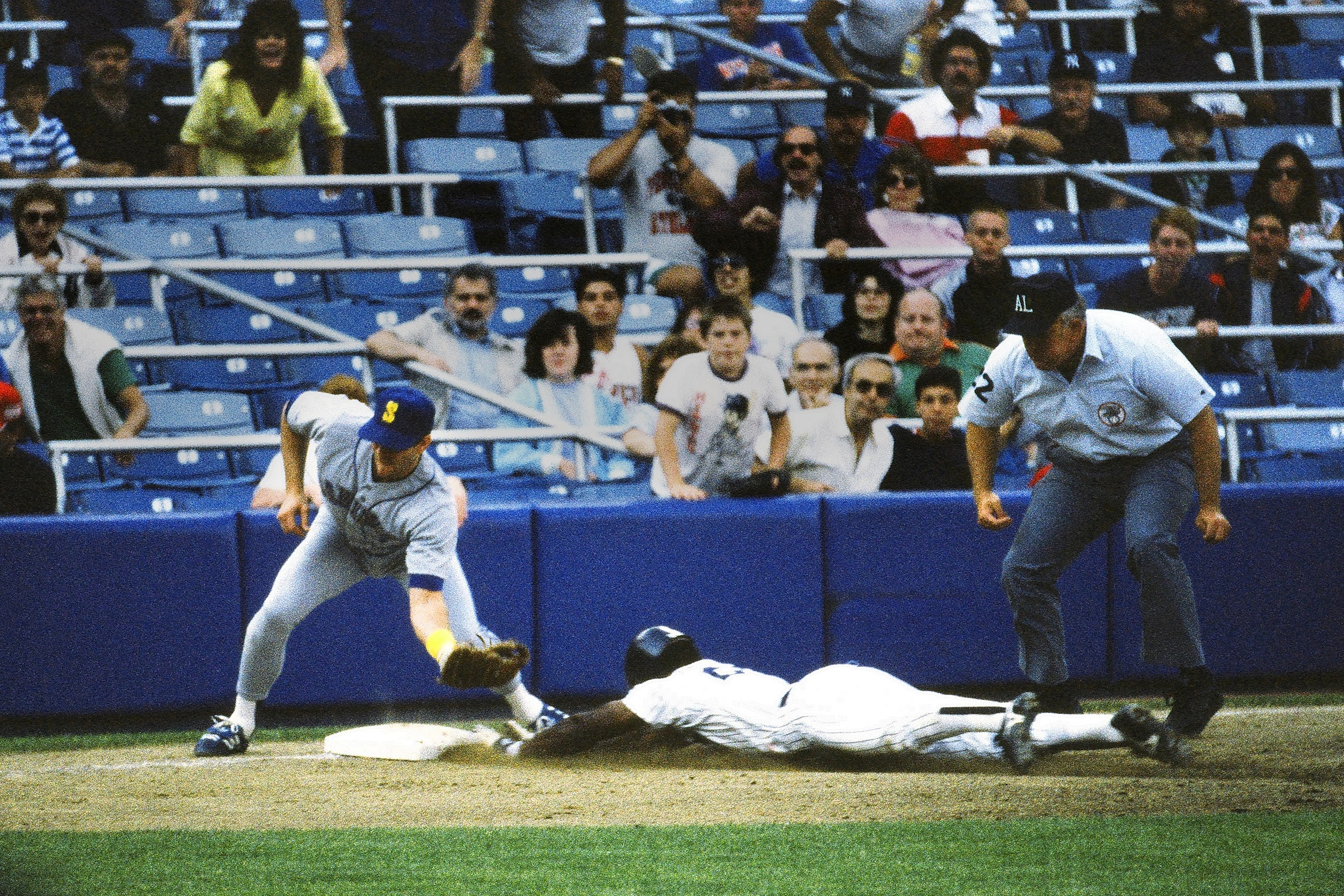
Presley (left) covering third base after a steal by Rickey Henderson

In 1985, the Mariners finished in last place, but Presley provided power with 28 home runs and a .275 batting average. In 1986, he was selected to the All-Star team, but he did not see any action at third base behind Wade Boggs and Brook Jacoby. That season, Presley became the second player in MLB history to hit two walk-off grand slams in the same season, following Cy Williams in 1926. In 1987, both his power numbers (24 home runs, and batting average of .247) dipped. Presley also had a career-high 107 RBIs and led the American League in assists by a third baseman. In January 1990, Seattle traded Presley to the Atlanta Braves in exchange for pitcher Gary Eave and minor league infielder Ken Pennington. Presley was only in Atlanta for one season and signed with the San Diego Padres as a free agent in 1991. He only appeared in 20 games for San Diego and then was on the move again, signing with the Texas Rangers. Presley never played at the major league level for Texas, instead playing for their Triple-A farm club, the Oklahoma City 89ers.

While playing for Seattle, Presley set the team record for most home runs hit by a third baseman, later surpassed by Kyle Seager. He also held the franchise record with 8 walk-off hits, since surpassed by Mitch Haniger.

== Coaching and managing career ==
Presley his coaching career at Pensacola Junior College, where he also earned a degree. He began coaching in the Arizona Diamondbacks minor league system in 1996. He was the Diamondbacks inaugural hitting coach, working that role through 2000. In 2004, Presley became the manager of the Missoula Osprey of the Pioneer League. He managed the team for two seasons, compiling a 61–88 record. On December 21, 2005, he was signed to be the hitting coach for the Florida Marlins. He was fired along with manager Fredi González and bench coach Carlos Tosca on June 23, 2010. He was the hitting coach for the Baltimore Orioles from 2011 to 2014. He coached the Triple-A Round Rock Express from 2016 to 2017. In 2018, the CTBC Brothers of the Chinese Professional Baseball League named Presley as their hitting coach. The Brothers fired Presley on September 18, replacing him with Tack Wilson.

== Personal life ==
Presley is married and has two children. He earned an associate degree from Pensacola Junior College after finishing his playing career. He earned bachelor's and master's degrees from the University of West Florida.
