= Gene Harris (baseball) =

American baseball player (born 1964)

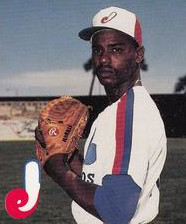
- Harris in 1988
- Relief pitcher
- Born: December 5, 1964 (age 61); Sebring, Florida, U.S.
- Batted: Right Threw: Right

MLB debut
- April 5, 1989, for the Montreal Expos

Last MLB appearance
- June 24, 1995, for the Baltimore Orioles

MLB statistics
- Win–loss record: 12–18
- Earned run average: 4.71
- Strikeouts: 170
- Stats at Baseball Reference

Teams
- Montreal Expos (1989); Seattle Mariners (1989–1992); San Diego Padres (1992–1994); Detroit Tigers (1994); Philadelphia Phillies (1995); Baltimore Orioles (1995)

Tyrone Eugene Harris (born December 5, 1964) is an American former professional baseball pitcher who played in Major League Baseball (MLB) in all or parts of seven seasons, from 1989 to 1995.

== Early life ==
Harris was a 1982 graduate of Okeechobee High School in Okeechobee, Florida. He attended Tulane University, where he played football and baseball. Harris accepted a scholarship to play football for the Tulane Green Wave with the expectation that he would also play on the baseball team. However, due to a change in coaching staffs, he was only allowed to play one season of college baseball. Harris was a defensive back and kick returner for the football team.

== Career ==
The Montreal Expos selected Harris in the fifth round of the 1986 MLB draft. He reached the majors with Montreal to start the 1989 season but was sent down to Triple-A in early May.

Later in May, Harris was part of a trade that the Expos would rue. They dealt future Hall of Famer Randy Johnson, Brian Holman, and Harris to the Seattle Mariners for Mark Langston and a player to be named later. Langston left as a free agent after the season.

Harris was up and down between the Mariners and Triple-A during his time in the Seattle organization. In May 1992, he left the Mariners, saying he was going to attend his stepfather's funeral but did not return to the team as scheduled. His agent told the team that he wanted to quit baseball to pursue a career in the National Football League. Harris spent two weeks away from the team, after which he was traded to the San Diego Padres for minor leaguer Will Taylor. Padres staff met with Harris before the trade, with Harris saying he would rather retire than continue with Seattle and that there had been no funeral.

Harris enjoyed the best year of his career in 1993, posting 23 saves for the Padres.

During the 1994 season, an injured and ineffective Harris lost his closer role with the Padres to Trevor Hoffman in mid-April. Harris was traded in May to the Detroit Tigers for Scott Livingstone and Jorge Velandia. Harris pitched only 11 1/3 innings for Detroit.

Harris signed as a free agent with the Philadelphia Phillies ahead of the 1995 season but was traded to the Baltimore Orioles in June for Andy Van Slyke. Harris made just three appearances for Baltimore before being sidelined with an injured elbow. He underwent season-ending elbow surgery in August. At that point, his big-league career ended.

Harris pitched in the minors for the Pittsburgh Pirates organization in 1996. He was out of the game in 1997. He made a brief comeback for Norfolk, the Triple-A affiliate of the New York Mets, in 1998.
