= Bill Wilkinson (baseball) =

American baseball player (born 1964)

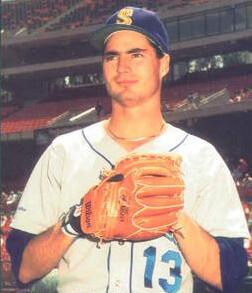
- Wilkinson with the Seattle Mariners c. 1987
- Pitcher
- Born: August 10, 1964 (age 61); Greybull, Wyoming, U.S.
- Batted: Right Threw: Left

MLB debut
- June 13, 1985, for the Seattle Mariners

Last MLB appearance
- October 2, 1988, for the Seattle Mariners

MLB statistics
- Win–loss record: 5–8
- Earned run average: 4.13
- Strikeouts: 103
- Stats at Baseball Reference

Teams
- Seattle Mariners (1985–1988)

William Carl Wilkinson (born August 10, 1964) is an American former professional baseball pitcher. A left-handed pitcher, Wilkinson played for Major League Baseball's (MLB) Seattle Mariners in 1985, 1987, and 1988. He had a 5–8 win–loss record, 4.56 earned run average (ERA) and 103 strikeouts in 113 1/3 innings pitched.

== Career ==
Wilkinson attended Cherry Creek High School in Greenwood Village, Colorado, where he was named the most valuable player and most outstanding athlete his senior season.

The Mariners selected Wilkinson in the fourth round of the 1983 MLB draft, with the 87th overall pick. On June 13, 1985, he made his MLB debut with the Mariners, and took the loss against the Kansas City Royals after allowing four earned runs in 5 2/3 innings. Five days later, Wilkinson lost in his only other appearance during the 1985 season, which was also a start; he allowed five earned runs and recorded only one out. In his two MLB starts, Wilkinson was 0–2 with a 13.50 earned run average (ERA). He was the fifth-youngest player in the American League in 1985. Following his start against the Rangers, the Mariners demoted him to the minor leagues. He strained his lower back on July 12 and missed the rest of the season.

Wilkinson did not pitch in MLB in 1986; he instead played for the Mariners' Triple-A affiliate, the Calgary Cannons of the Pacific Coast League. In 1985 and 1986, Wilkinson had a combined record of 13–9 while pitching for the Cannons, leading the team with 23 starts and 7 complete games.

Wilkinson appeared in 56 games as a reliever for Seattle in 1987, the most of any Mariners pitcher that year. He dealt with elbow tendinitis, going on the 15-day disabled list in late July. He had a 3–4 record, with a 3.66 ERA and 10 saves. The following season, Wilkinson pitched in 30 games, and posted a 2–2 record with two saves and a career-low 3.48 ERA.

However, Wilkinson suffered an injury to his left shoulder. Before the 1989 season began, he was sent back down to the minors, where he was used as a starter. In April, the Mariners traded Wilkinson to the Pittsburgh Pirates as part of a five-player transaction. Wilkinson never pitched for the Pirates and did not return to MLB after 1988. His final minor league season was 1992, when he pitched for two teams in the Oakland Athletics organization, posting an 0–3 record and 8.21 ERA in 23 games.

== Personal life ==
Born in Greybull, Wyoming, Wilkinson is the great-grandson of Jim Bluejacket, a right-handed pitcher who spent three seasons in the Federal League and National League from 1914 to 1916. Bluejacket and Wilkinson were the first great-grandfather and great-grandson duo that have both played in MLB. Wilkinson's brother, Brian, was selected in the 1987 MLB draft by the Mariners and reached High-A in 1991.
