= List of Seattle Mariners seasons =

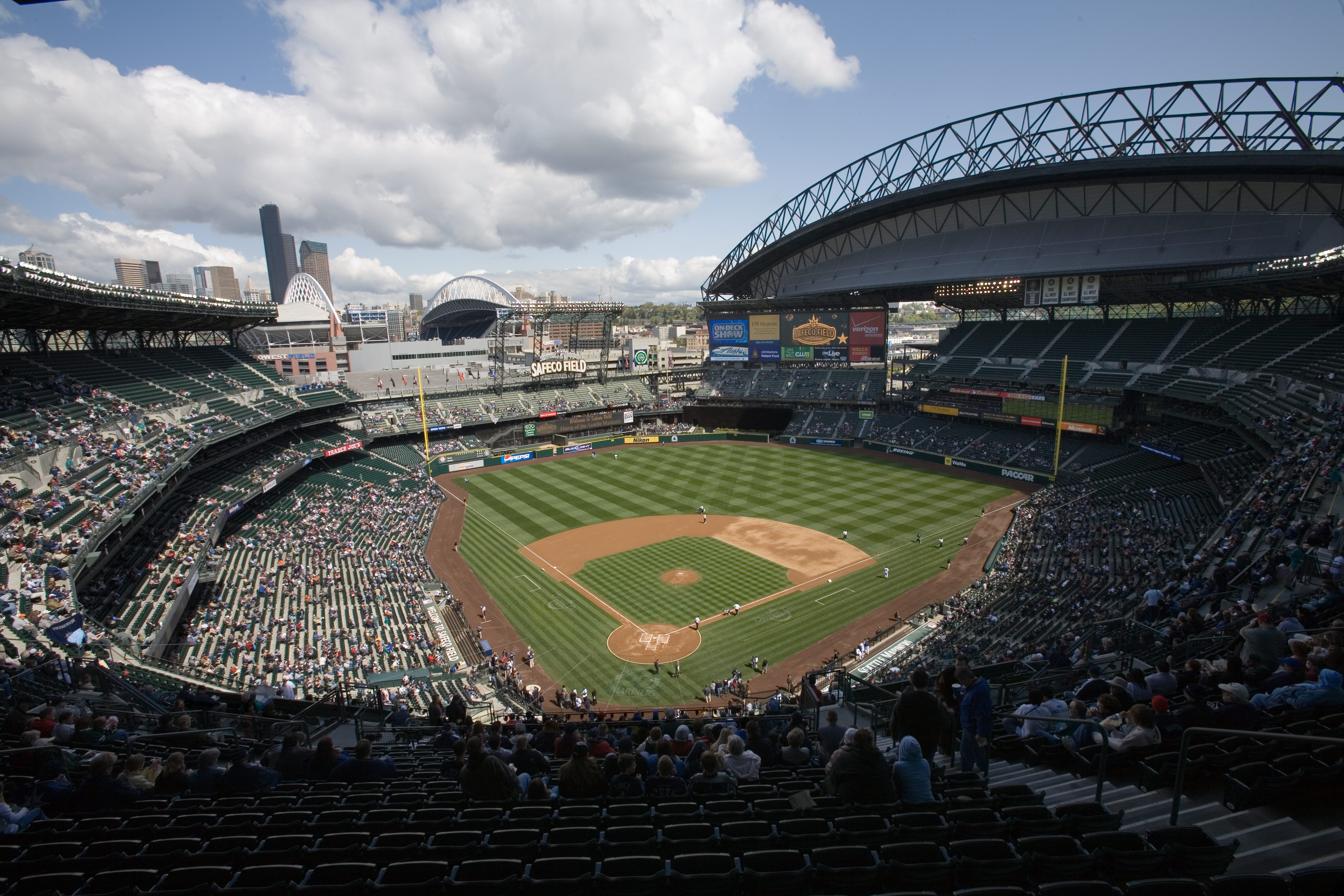
The Seattle Mariners have played their home games at T-Mobile Park since it opened in 1999.

The Seattle Mariners are a Major League Baseball (MLB) team based in Seattle, Washington, United States. The team has been a member of the American League's West division since they entered as an expansion franchise in 1977. Their name was chosen in a public contest and reflects the city's nautical history and location on Puget Sound. The team's first home stadium was the Kingdome, an indoor multi-purpose stadium shared with other sports, from 1977 until 1999. The Mariners moved to their current home, T-Mobile Park (formerly Safeco Field), when it opened on July 15, 1999; the stadium has a retractable roof and a seating capacity of 47,943.

The first MLB team in the Pacific Northwest, the Seattle Pilots, played for one season in 1969 as an American League expansion team at Sick's Stadium, a former minor league venue. After their sale to avoid bankruptcy, the Pilots moved to Milwaukee in 1970 and became the Brewers. The governments of Seattle, King County, and Washington filed a lawsuit against the American League in 1975 for a breach of contract in breaking the lease at Sick's Stadium; the lawsuit was withdrawn in exchange for a team that would play at the new Kingdome. After failed attempts to relocate an existing team, an expansion franchise was granted in 1976.

The Mariners played their first game at the Kingdome on April 6, 1977, and finished their first season with a 64–98 record. The team had 14 consecutive losing seasons and never finished in the top half of the seven-team AL West division until the 1990s; their first winning season was achieved in 1991 under manager Jim Lefebvre, who was fired at the end of the season. The Mariners clinched the division title in 1995 by defeating the California Angels in a tie-breaker game after the two teams finished with identical 78–66 records. They earned a place in the postseason for the first time in franchise history amid the threat of relocation due to the Kingdome's deteriorating condition. The team's playoff run, which included a comeback series victory against the New York Yankees, ended with a loss to the Cleveland Indians in the American League Championship Series (ALCS). In October 1995, the state and county governments approved financing to build a new stadium a month after voters had rejected a referendum on the issue. Under manager Lou Piniella, the Mariners had three consecutive seasons with winning records and made another postseason appearance in 1997, but failed to advance beyond the American League Division Series (ALDS).

The team earned their first wild card berth in the 2000 season and advanced to the ALCS, where they lost to the Yankees. During the 2001 season, the Mariners won 116 games and tied the 1906 Chicago Cubs for the MLB record. The team advanced to the ALCS for the third time in franchise history and lost to the Yankees for the second consecutive year. The Mariners failed to qualify for the postseason from 2001 to 2022; the 21-year period was the longest active playoff drought in the North American major sports leagues at the time and among the longest in MLB history. The team ended the drought with a wild card berth in 2022 and advanced to the ALDS, where they were eliminated by the Houston Astros, another AL West franchise. The Mariners failed to return to the playoffs in the 2023 season despite finishing with a winning record for the third consecutive year.

As of the end of their 50th season in 2026, the Mariners have an all-time regular season record of 3,765 wins and 4,108 losses. They have had a winning record in 19 seasons, a losing record in 31 seasons, and six postseason berths. After the Washington Nationals won the National League title in 2019, the Mariners are the only active MLB franchise never to have appeared in the World Series.

== Regular season results ==
Key to colors

†	World Series champions
*	American League champions
^	Division champions
¤	Wild Card berth (1995–present)

Key to abbreviations

- AL – American League
- ALCS – American League Championship Series
- ALDS – American League Division Series
- ALWC – American League Wild Card Games

Key to awards

- MVP – Most Valuable Player Award
- CYA – Cy Young Award
- ROY – Rookie of the Year Award
- MOY – Manager of the Year Award
- CB POY – Comeback Player of the Year Award
- WS MVP – World Series Most Valuable Player Award

Seattle Mariners regular season record by season
MLB season	Team season	League	Division	Regular season					Postseason results	Awards	Manager (list)
MLB season	Team season	League	Division	Finish	W	L	Pct	GB	Postseason results	Awards	Manager (list)
1977	1977	AL	West	6th	64	98	.395	38	—	—	Darrell Johnson
1978	1978	AL	West	7th	56	104	.350	35	—	—	Darrell Johnson
1979	1979	AL	West	6th	67	95	.414	21	—	—	Darrell Johnson
1980	1980 (Note: In both the 1980 and 1981 seasons, the Mariners played one game which ended in a tie not reflected in the regular season table. On June 2, 1980, the Mariners were tied 3–3 with the Detroit Tigers after 13 innings before the game in Detroit was suspended due to rain; the game was replayed on August 1 as part of a doubleheader. On April 29, 1981, the Mariners played 8 innings with the Minnesota Twins at the Hubert H. Humphrey Metrodome that was called off due to rain and hail with the score tied at 7; it was replayed on August 14 as the first game in a doubleheader. In 2007, the Major League Baseball Rules Committee approved a rule change that no longer required tied games to be replayed in their entirety; suspended games that are tied in the bottom of the fifth inning or later are to be resumed at the same stadium at the next meeting between the same teams.)	AL	West	7th	59	103	.364	38	—	—	Darrell Johnson (39–65) Maury Wills (20–38)
1981 (Note: A players' strike was called on June 12, 1981, and ended 59 days later on August 9. The 1981 season was reorganized into a split season with two champions for each division—the team with the best record in pre-strike games and the team with the best record in post-strike games (or the runner-up if the same team won both halves).)	1981	AL	West	6th	44	65	.404	20	—	—	Maury Wills (6–18) Rene Lachemann (38–47)
1982	1982	AL	West	4th	76	86	.469	17	—	—	Rene Lachemann
1983	1983	AL	West	7th	60	102	.370	39	—	—	Rene Lachemann (26–47) Del Crandall (34–55)
1984	1984	AL	West	5th	74	88	.457	10	—	Alvin Davis (ROY)	Del Crandall (59–76) Chuck Cottier (15–12)
1985	1985	AL	West	6th	74	88	.457	17	—	—	Chuck Cottier
1986	1986	AL	West	7th	67	95	.414	25	—	—	Chuck Cottier (9–19) Marty Martínez (59–76) Dick Williams (58–75)
1987	1987	AL	West	4th	78	84	.481	7	—	—	Dick Williams
1988	1988	AL	West	7th	68	93	.422	35	—	—	Dick Williams (23–33) Jim Snyder (45–60)
1989	1989	AL	West	6th	73	89	.451	26	—	—	Jim Lefebvre
1990	1990	AL	West	5th	77	85	.475	26	—	—	Jim Lefebvre
1991	1991	AL	West	5th	83	79	.512	12	—	—	Jim Lefebvre
1992	1992	AL	West	7th	64	98	.395	32	—	—	Bill Plummer
1993	1993	AL	West	4th	82	80	.506	12	—	—	Lou Piniella
1994 (Note: The 1994–95 Major League Baseball strike, which started on August 12, led to the cancellation of the playoffs and World Series. As a result of the shortened season, MLB did not officially award division championships. Although they spent the entire season with a losing record, the Mariners were two games behind AL West leaders Texas Rangers by August 12.)	1994 (Note: The Kingdome was closed for emergency repairs following the collapse of ceiling tiles on July 19, 1994. As a result, the Mariners played the remainder of their schedule on the road; of the 30 scheduled road games, only 20 were played due to the players' strike called on August 12 that cancelled the rest of the season.)	AL	West	3rd	49	63	.438	2	Playoffs cancelled by players' strike	—	Lou Piniella
1995	1995	AL	West ^	1st ^ (Note: The Mariners and California Angels finished with identical 78–66 records during the strike-shortened regular season. The Mariners won the tie-breaker game, which is included in the regular season statistics.)	79	66	.545	—	Won ALDS (Yankees) 3–2; Lost ALCS (Indians) 4–2	Randy Johnson (CYA) Lou Piniella (MOY)	Lou Piniella
1996	1996	AL	West	2nd	85	76	.528	4½	—	—	Lou Piniella
1997	1997	AL	West ^	1st ^	90	72	.556	—	Lost ALDS (Orioles) 3–1	Ken Griffey Jr. (MVP)	Lou Piniella
1998	1998	AL	West	3rd	76	85	.472	11½	—	—	Lou Piniella
1999	1999	AL	West	3rd	79	83	.488	16	—	—	Lou Piniella
2000	2000	AL	West	2nd ¤	91	71	.562	½	Won ALDS (White Sox) 3–0; Lost ALCS (Yankees) 4–2	Kazuhiro Sasaki (ROY)	Lou Piniella
2001	2001	AL	West ^	1st ^	116 (Note: The team's 116 wins tied an MLB record that was originally set by the 1906 Chicago Cubs. However, the Mariners played ten more games than the 1906 Cubs.)	46	.716	—	Won ALDS (Indians) 3–2; Lost ALCS (Yankees) 4–1	Ichiro Suzuki (MVP, ROY) Lou Piniella (MOY)	Lou Piniella
2002	2002	AL	West	3rd	93	69	.574	10	—	—	Lou Piniella
2003	2003	AL	West	2nd	93	69	.574	3	—	—	Bob Melvin
2004	2004	AL	West	4th	63	99	.389	29	—	—	Bob Melvin
2005	2005	AL	West	4th	69	93	.426	26	—	—	Mike Hargrove
2006	2006	AL	West	4th	78	84	.481	15	—	—	Mike Hargrove
2007	2007	AL	West	2nd	88	74	.543	6	—	—	Mike Hargrove (45–33) John McLaren (43–41)
2008	2008	AL	West	4th	61	101	.377	39	—	—	John McLaren (25–47) Jim Riggleman (36–54)
2009	2009	AL	West	3rd	85	77	.525	12	—	—	Don Wakamatsu
2010	2010	AL	West	4th	61	101	.377	29	—	Félix Hernández (CYA)	Don Wakamatsu (42–70) Daren Brown (19–31)
2011	2011	AL	West	4th	67	95	.414	29	—	—	Eric Wedge
2012	2012	AL	West	4th	75	87	.463	19	—	—	Eric Wedge
2013	2013	AL	West	4th	71	91	.438	25	—	—	Eric Wedge
2014	2014	AL	West	3rd	87	75	.537	11	—	Chris Young (CB POY)	Lloyd McClendon
2015	2015	AL	West	4th	76	86	.469	12	—	—	Lloyd McClendon
2016	2016	AL	West	2nd	86	76	.531	9	—	—	Scott Servais
2017	2017	AL	West	3rd	78	84	.481	23	—	—	Scott Servais
2018	2018	AL	West	3rd	89	73	.549	14	—	—	Scott Servais
2019	2019	AL	West	5th	68	94	.420	39	—	—	Scott Servais
2020 (Note: The start of the 2020 season was postponed by MLB due to the COVID-19 pandemic. The shortened 60-game regular season began on July 24, 2020, with games played behind closed doors against teams in the American League West and National League West to reduce travel.)	2020	AL	West	3rd	27	33	.450	9	—	Kyle Lewis (ROY)	Scott Servais
2021	2021	AL	West	2nd	90	72	.556	5	—	—	Scott Servais
2022	2022	AL	West	2nd ¤	90	72	.556	16	Won ALWC (Blue Jays) 2–0; Lost ALDS (Astros) 3–0	Julio Rodríguez (ROY)	Scott Servais
2023	2023	AL	West	3rd	88	74	.543	2	—	—	Scott Servais
2024	2024	AL	West	2nd	85	77	.525	2	—	—	Scott Servais (64–64) Dan Wilson (21–13)
2025	2025	AL	West ^	1st ^	90	72	.556	—	Won ALDS (Tigers) 3–2; Lost ALCS (Blue Jays) 4–3	—	Dan Wilson
2026	2026	AL	West	3rd	76	86	.469	5	—	—	Dan Wilson
Totals (50 seasons)					3,765	4,108	.478	All-time regular season record (1977–2026)			
Totals (50 seasons)					23	27	.460	All-time postseason record (1977–2026)			
Totals (50 seasons)					3,788	4,135	.478	All-time regular and postseason record (1977–2026)			

== Record by decade ==
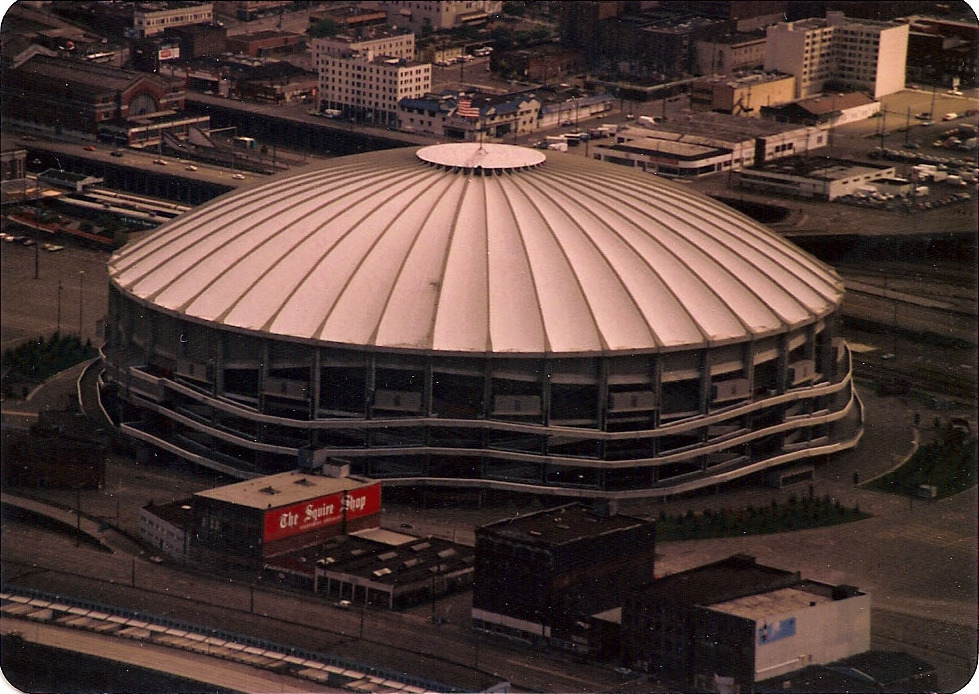
The Kingdome, an indoor multi-purpose stadium, was the home of the Seattle Mariners from 1977 to 1999.

As of the 2026 season

The following table summarizes the Mariners' win–loss record in the MLB regular season by decade.

Regular-season record by decade
Decade	Wins	Losses	Pct
1970s	187	297	.386
1980s	673	893	.430
1990s	764	787	.493
2000s	837	783	.517
2010s	758	862	.468
2020s	546	486	.529
All-time	3,765	4,108	.478

== Postseason record by year ==
The Mariners have made the postseason six times in their history. Their first postseason appearance was in 1995 and the most recent was in 2025.

Postseason record and results
Year	Finish	Round	Opponent	Result	W	L
1995	AL West champions	ALDS	New York Yankees	Won	3	2
1995	AL West champions	ALCS	Cleveland Indians	Lost	2	4
1997	AL West champions	ALDS	Baltimore Orioles	Lost	1	3
2000	AL Wild Card	ALDS	Chicago White Sox	Won	3	0
2000	AL Wild Card	ALCS	New York Yankees	Lost	2	4
2001	AL West champions	ALDS	Cleveland Indians	Won	3	2
2001	AL West champions	ALCS	New York Yankees	Lost	1	4
2022	AL Wild Card	ALWC	Toronto Blue Jays	Won	2	0
2022	AL Wild Card	ALDS	Houston Astros	Lost	0	3
2025	AL West champions	ALDS	Detroit Tigers	Won	3	2
2025	AL West champions	ALCS	Toronto Blue Jays	Lost	3	4
Totals				5–6	23	28

== See also ==
- History of the Seattle Mariners
- List of Seattle Mariners managers
- List of Seattle Mariners Opening Day starting pitchers
- Seattle Mariners team records
