= List of Seattle Mariners managers =

There have been 21 managers in the history of the Seattle Mariners Major League Baseball (MLB) franchise. The Mariners franchise was formed in 1977 as a member of the American League. Darrell Johnson was hired as the first Mariners manager, serving for just over three seasons before being replaced during the 1980 season. In terms of tenure, Lou Piniella has managed more games and seasons than any other coach in their franchise history. He managed the Mariners to four playoff berths (1995, 1997, 2000 and 2001), led the team to the American League Championship Series in 1995, 2000 and 2001, and won the Manager of the Year award in 1995 and 2001. Until 2022, Piniella was the only manager in Mariners history to lead a team into the playoffs, with one of those times after a 116-win season, tying the record for most wins in a season. None of the previous managers had made it to the playoffs before. Piniella, however, managed the team in 34 playoff games, winning 15 and losing 19. Dick Williams is the only Mariners manager to have been inducted into the Baseball Hall of Fame.

There have been nine interim managers in Mariners history. In 1980, manager Darrell Johnson was replaced by Maury Wills. In 1981, manager Rene Lachemann replaced Maury Wills. In 1983, Lachemann was relieved by Del Crandall. Crandall did not last a full season either, as Chuck Cottier took over his job in 1984. By 1986, Cottier was replaced with a temporary manager, Marty Martinez. After one game, the Mariners found Dick Williams to take over the role of manager. He in turn was replaced by Jim Snyder in 1988. In 2007, manager Mike Hargrove resigned in a surprise move amidst a winning streak, citing increased difficulty in putting forth the same effort he demanded of his players. Hargrove was replaced with bench coach John McLaren midseason. A year later, in 2008, the Mariners front office decided McLaren was not performing by their standards, and was fired and replaced by interim manager Jim Riggleman. New general manager Jack Zduriencik hired Don Wakamatsu as skipper for the 2009 season; after finishing the season with a .525 winning percentage, the team's poor performance coupled with off-field issues led to Wakamatsu's firing on August 9, 2010. Daren Brown, who was the manager of the Mariners' Triple-A affiliate, the Tacoma Rainiers, managed the Mariners for the remainder of the 2010 season. Eric Wedge was hired to manage the team for the 2011 to 2013 seasons. Lloyd McClendon was hired as the Mariners' manager on November 7, 2013, till the end of the 2015 season. Scott Servais was hired on October 23, 2015, and lead the team to their first playoff appearance since 2001 in 2022 while also becoming the second longest tenured manager in team history from 2016 to 2024. The Mariners then fired Servais after a midseason collapse on August 22, 2024, and immediately hired Dan Wilson as their next manager on the same day.

== Key ==
#	Number of coaches^{[A]}
GC	Games coached
W	Wins
L	Losses
Win%	Winning percentage
PGM	Playoff games managed
PW	Playoff wins
PL	Playoff losses
*	Elected to the Baseball Hall of Fame

Statistics are accurate through 2026 season.

== Managers ==
#^{[a]}	Image	Manager	Seasons	G	W	L	Win%	PGM	PW	PL	Awards	Ref
1		Darrell Johnson	1977–1980	588	226	362	.384	–	–	–		
2		Maury Wills	1980–1981	82	26	56	.317	–	–	–		
3		Rene Lachemann	1981–1983	320	140	180	.438	–	–	–		
4		Del Crandall	1983–1984	224	93	131	.415	–	–	–		
5		Chuck Cottier	1984–1986	217	98	119	.452	–	–	–		
6		Marty Martínez	1986	1	0	1	.000	–	–	–		
7		Dick Williams*	1986–1988	351	159	192	.453	–	–	–		
8		Jim Snyder	1988	105	45	60	.429	–	–	–		
9		Jim Lefebvre	1989–1991	486	233	253	.479	–	–	–		
10		Bill Plummer	1992	162	64	98	.395	–	–	–		
11		Lou Piniella	1993–2002	1,551	840	711	.542	34	15	19	Manager of the Year Award (1995, 2001)	
12		Bob Melvin	2003–2004	324	156	168	.481	–	–	–		
13		Mike Hargrove	2005–2007	402	192	210	.478	–	–	–		
14		John McLaren	2007–2008	156	68	88	.436	–	–	–		
15		Jim Riggleman	2008	90	36	54	.400	–	–	–		
16		Don Wakamatsu	2009–2010	274	127	147	.464	–	–	–		
17		Daren Brown	2010	50	19	31	.380	–	–	–		
18		Eric Wedge	2011–2013	486	213	273	.440	–	–	–		
19		Lloyd McClendon	2014–2015	324	163	161	.503	–	–	–		
20		Scott Servais	2016–2024	1,292	668	624	.517	5	2	3		
21		Dan Wilson	2024–2026	358	187	171	.522	12	6	6		

== Notes ==
- ^{A} A running total of the number of managers of the Mariners. Thus any manager who has had two or more terms as manager is only counted once.
