= History of the Seattle Mariners =

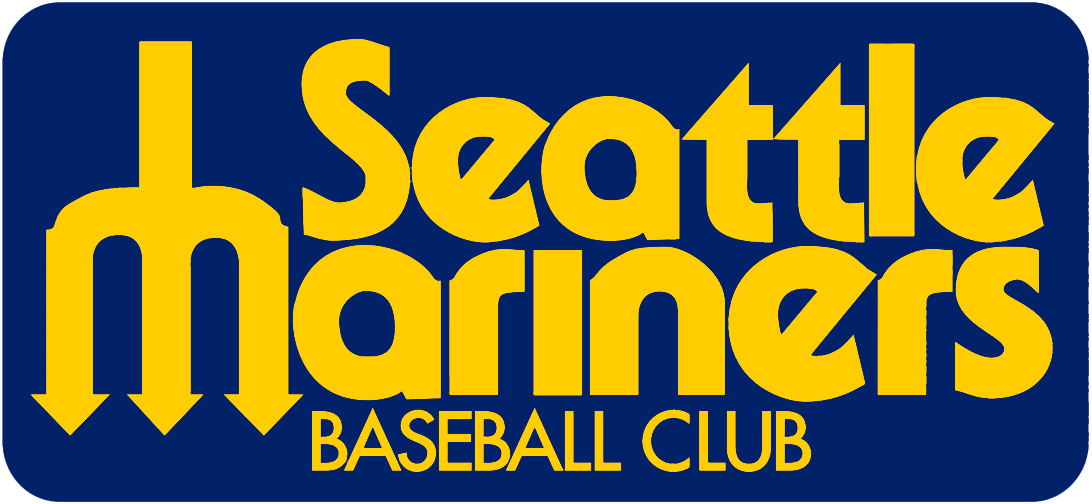
Mariners logo, 1977–1979

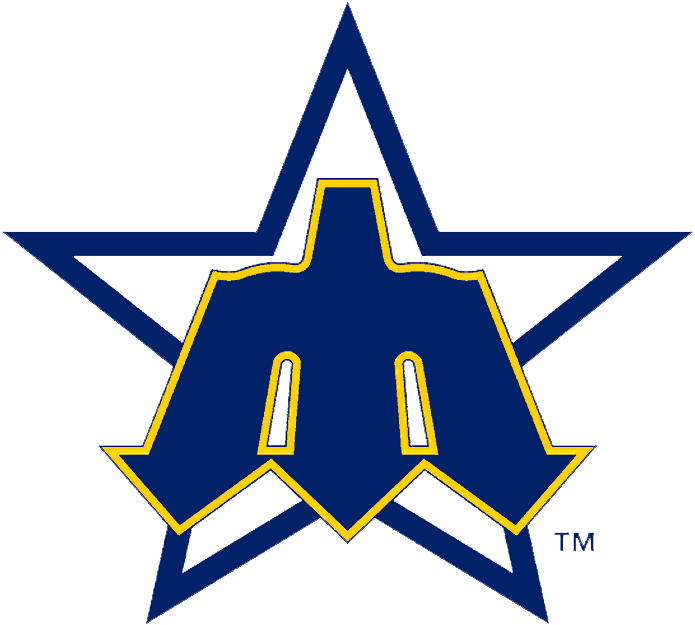
Mariners logo, 1980–1986

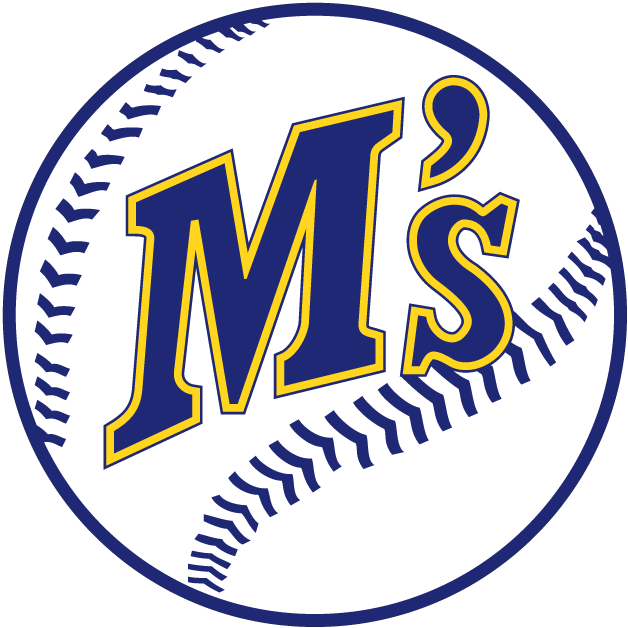
Mariners logo, 1987–1992

The Seattle Mariners are an American professional baseball team based in Seattle, Washington. Enfranchised in 1977, the Mariners are a member of the Western Division of Major League Baseball's American League. Safeco Field, now named T-Mobile Park, has been the Mariners' home ballpark since July 1999. From their 1977 inception until June 1999, the club's home park was the Kingdome.

== 1965–1976: Origins and formation ==
Before being awarded a team in Major League Baseball, Seattle had been a staple of the Pacific Coast League minor league dating back to the late 19th century. The first attempt to land a major league team failed when a bid by William Daley to move the Cleveland Indians to Seattle in 1965 fell apart. In late 1967, Daley, by then having sold the Indians, led a consortium to win a franchise in the 1969 expansion (said expansion was originally planned for 1971, but pressure by Missouri senator Stuart Symington led to the expansion taking place two years earlier than scheduled). That team became the Seattle Pilots. The Pilots, amidst a bevy of financial problems, were sold and relocated to Milwaukee after just one season in Seattle in April 1970 and became the Milwaukee Brewers.

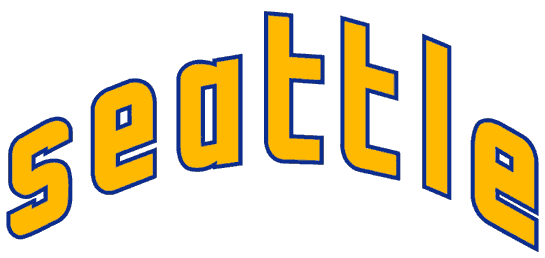

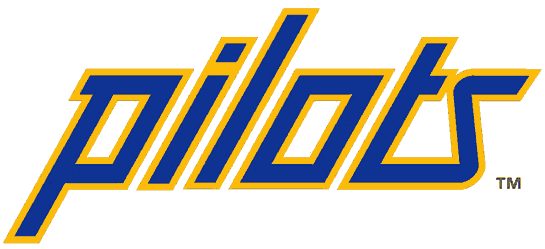
The wordmarks for the Seattle Pilots in 1969

The Mariners were created as a result of a lawsuit. In 1970, in the aftermath of the Pilots' purchase and relocation to Milwaukee by future Commissioner of Baseball Bud Selig, the City of Seattle, King County, and the state of Washington (represented by then-State Attorney General and future U.S. Senator Slade Gorton) sued the American League for breach of contract. Confident that Major League Baseball would return to Seattle within a few years, King County built the multi-purpose Kingdome, which would also become home to the NFL's expansion Seattle Seahawks in 1976.

The Pilots lawsuit continued until 1976. At trial, the American League offered to give Seattle an expansion baseball franchise in return for dropping the suit, and details were ironed out over the next year. To keep the league with an even number of teams, a formal expansion proceeding was held, with a second team, the Blue Jays, awarded to the city of Toronto (also allowing both leagues to place a team in Canada, the National League's Montreal Expos (now the Washington Nationals) having been established in 1969). The new Seattle team, to begin play in 1977, was to be owned by a consortium led by entertainer Danny Kaye, along with Stanley Golub, Walter Schoenfeld, Lester Smith, James Stillwell Jr., and James A. Walsh. The cost of the franchise was approximately $5.5 million, similar to the cost for the Pilots in 1969.

The name "Mariners" was chosen by club officials in August 1976 from over 600 names submitted by 15,000 entrants in a name-the-team contest. The name was submitted by Roger Szmodis of suburban Bellevue. However, when the Mariners attempted to reach Szmodis about the prize he had won as a result of his entry being chosen, they were unable to make contact with him, with all efforts to track the man down for years being unsuccessful. According to Dick Vertlieb, the first general manager of the Mariners, he wanted to name the team "Hustlers" or "Pros" and dress them in black, even stating his disappointment in an interview for the eventual name chosen that he described as "lame".

== 1977–1990: Debut and winning struggles ==
The Mariners played their first game on April 6, 1977, to a sold-out crowd of 57,762 at the Kingdome, getting shut out by the California Angels 7–0. After also being shut out in their second game, the team recorded its first win two days later defeating the Angels, 7–6. The first home run in team history was hit on April 10, 1977, by designated hitter Juan Bernhardt. That year, star pitcher Diego Seguí, in his last major league season, became the only player to play for both the Pilots and the Mariners. The Mariners finished with a 64–98 record, good for a sixth-place finish in the AL West, echoing the record the 1969 Pilots once held; however, the team narrowly avoided last place by half a game. In 1979, Seattle hosted the 50th MLB All-Star Game at the Kingdome. Prior to the 1981 season, the Mariners were sold to southern California businessman (and future ambassador to Spain) George Argyros for an estimated $12.5 million. The sale of the team, which needed the approval of 10 of 14 owners of American League teams, received a unanimous vote of consent on January 29.

Despite having stars such as Hall of Fame pitcher Gaylord Perry (nicknamed the "Ancient Mariner"), 1984 American League Rookie of the Year Alvin Davis, two-time All-Star and three-time Gold Glove winner Harold Reynolds, three-time American League strikeout leader Mark Langston, and shortstop and team captain Spike Owen on their rosters, the Mariners teams of the late 1970s and the entirety of the 1980s were characterized by perennial non-achievement, gaining a reputation for poor performances, low attendance, and losing records. Moreover, the team's ownership again changed hands in August 1989, as Argyros sold the club to a group headed by Indianapolis communications magnate Jeff Smulyan for $76 million. However, the 1989 rookie season of center fielder Ken Griffey Jr., acquired with the first overall pick of the 1987 amateur draft, gave fans hope that a change of fortunes might be on the horizon. The Mariners finished with a losing record in 1990, but did have their moments that year with Randy Johnson's first no-hitter on June 2, and on September 14, Ken Griffey Sr. and Ken Griffey Jr. hit back-to-back home runs, becoming the first father-and-son duo to hit home runs in the same game.

== 1991–1992: A glimmer of hope ==
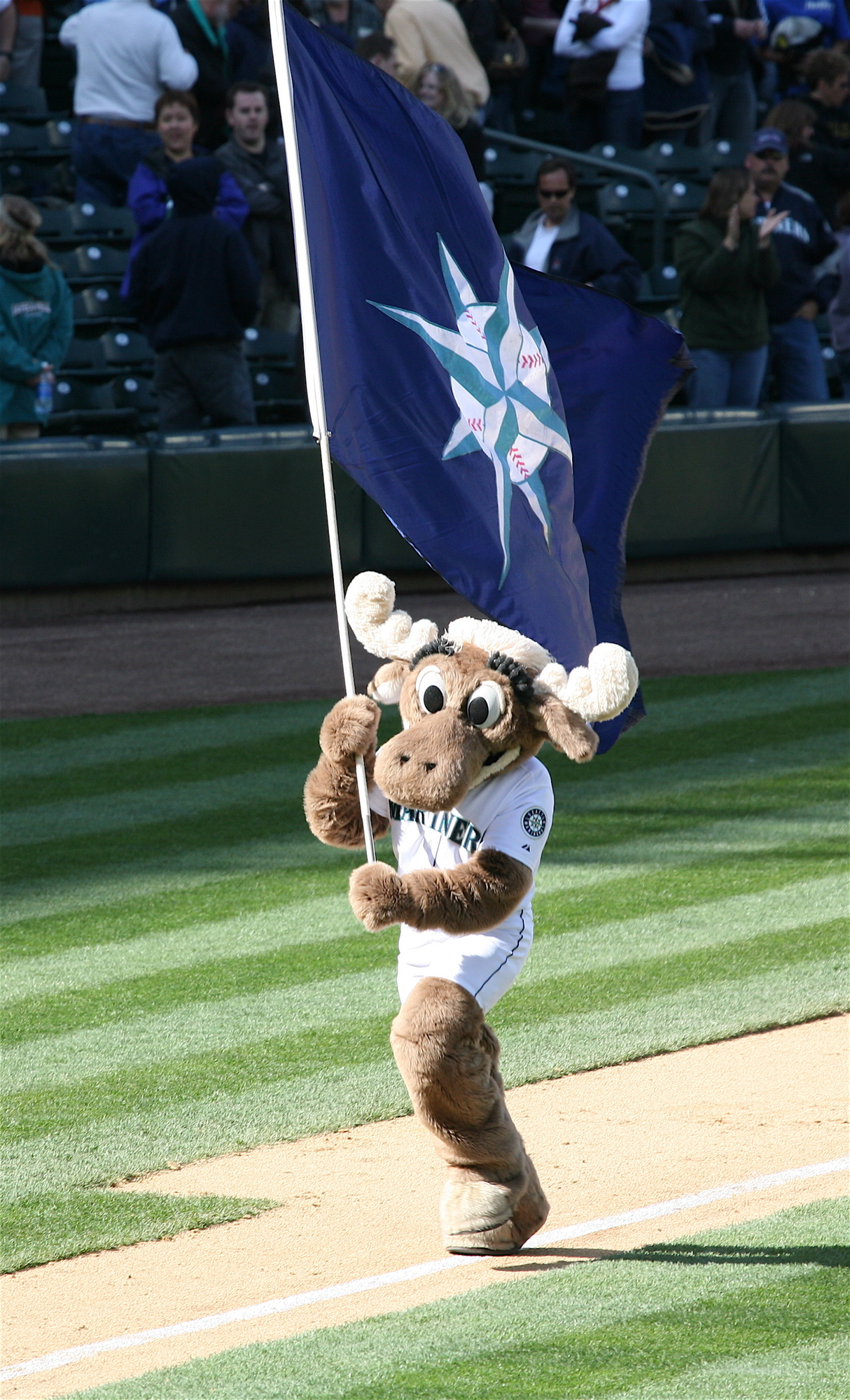
The Mariner Moose, team mascot since 1990

After yet another dismal performance in 1990, the Mariners managed their first winning season in 1991, finishing 83–79 under manager Jim Lefebvre. Though it was the team's best season up to that point, it was only good enough for a fifth-place finish in the seven-team American League West in which no team finished under .500, and Lefebvre was fired after that season. The team hired Bill Plummer as Lefebvre's replacement for the 1992 season, but he too was let go after a 98-loss campaign in 1992. Much of the reason for that was trading away pitchers Bill Swift, Mike Jackson and Dave Burba to the San Francisco Giants for outfielder Kevin Mitchell and pitcher Mike Remlinger. Bill Swift won the ERA title in 1992 and finish second in Cy Young voting in 1993, Mike Jackson had a solid career as a relief pitcher and Burba pitched well as both a reliever and starter. While Kevin Mitchell had a solid year in 1992, he was traded the next season to Cincinnati for Norm Charlton and Mike Remlinger did not even play in a Mariner uniform. By this time, having enough of the lack of enthusiasm for the city towards the team, Jeff Smulyan attempted to sell the team that could mean relocation by triggering an escape clause. Lawyer Art Harrigan argued that the timing of when the clause could apply did not apply there, which proved successful in forcing Smulyan to first offer local buyers a chance to buy it for roughly $100 million before buyers (such as in Tampa Bay) could pounce. Through the efforts of United States Senator Slade Gorton, the Mariners found a group of Seattle-area businessmen to buy the team, led by Nintendo chairman Hiroshi Yamauchi. The purchase was initially opposed by baseball officials, who objected to a team being owned by a non-North American entity. Eventually, they allowed the sale, provided that the team's presidency and chairmanship remained in the hands of American partners; the new ownership promised to keep the team in Seattle.

== 1993–2002 ==
=== 1993: The new and improved Mariners ===
In 1993, the Mariners introduced new uniforms and a new color scheme. Prior to the season, the Mariners hired manager Lou Piniella, who had led the Cincinnati Reds to victory in the 1990 World Series and was a fan favorite during his playing career, primarily with the New York Yankees. Mariners fans embraced Piniella, and he managed the team for a decade, winning two American League Manager of the Year Awards along the way. For only the second time, the Mariners had a winning record, though only two games above .500, at 82–80.

=== 1994 season: The labor strike-shortened season ===
The Mariners' fortunes began to improve in 1994. Beginning in the late 1980s, the team had added a core of strong players built around center fielder Ken Griffey Jr., pitcher Randy Johnson, third baseman Edgar Martínez, and right fielder Jay Buhner. On July 19, 1994, four 15-pound ceiling tiles fell from the Kingdome roof onto the field and into the stadium's seating bowl. The incident led to uncertainty over whether the Kingdome was fit for use as a major league stadium, and may well have ultimately been a factor leading to the construction of Safeco Field. Unable to play at the venue while repairs were being executed, the Major League Baseball Players' Association rejected the idea of playing games at Cheney Stadium in Tacoma or BC Place in Vancouver, feeling that games should not be played in non-MLB venues. This forced the Mariners to play their next 20 games on the road over the span of 21 days. The long trip began miserably as the Mariners started off 2–8, but rebounded to win nine of their next ten games, leaving them just 2 games behind the division-leading Texas Rangers when a players' strike was called on August 12 that resulted in the cancellation of the rest of the season (at that point, no team in the American League West had reached .500, with the Rangers being the closest at 10 games below, at 52–62; the Mariners were 50–64). Many players felt the time together on the road and the overcoming of the adversity faced that season fed directly into the success the team achieved in the 1995 season. The extended road trip resulted in a peculiarity, in which the first game in a series with the Boston Red Sox – which was supposed to be in Seattle – was rained out; if one still counts this as a home game, it marked the first – and so far only – home rainout in Mariners history (the Kingdome's successor venue for the Mariners, T-Mobile Park has a retractable roof, so games can either be played indoors or outdoors, always indoors when it is raining).

=== 1995 season: "Refuse to Lose"/the first playoff season ===
Although pitchers Randy Johnson, Bill Risley, and Bobby Ayala combined for an opening-day three-hit shutout, the Mariners' 1995 season started off on a bad note overall, as Griffey sustained a major early-season injury. Despite this loss, the Mariners continued to play fairly well, guided by Piniella. In mid-August, however, the Mariners appeared to be out of contention, 13 games behind the first-place California Angels. In September, a ballot measure for a new stadium for the Mariners was shot down by King County voters. However, luck turned their way that month.

The tide turned with a September winning streak marked by late-inning comeback wins, which led to their most-known slogan "Refuse to Lose". Combined with an absolute collapse by the Angels, this opened the way for the Mariners to end up tied with the Angels for first place at the end of the regular season, forcing a one-game playoff. The playoff pitted Johnson against Angels ace Mark Langston, whom, incidentally, the Mariners had traded for Johnson in 1989. Langston ended up on the seat of his pants at homeplate failing to tag out Luis Sojo who came all the way around after clearing the bases with a ball that got by the Angels first baseman, J. T. Snow, rattled around underneath California's bullpen bench, and resulted in a hurried and errant cut-off throw from Langston. The Mariners won the tiebreaker game 9–1 and clinched their first-ever trip to the playoffs. The Mariners had won 25 of their last 36 games.

Here's the pitch. Swing, and it's a ground ball, and it gets on by Snow. Down the right field line into the bullpen. Here comes Blowers. Here comes Tino. Here comes Joey. The throw to the plate is cut off. The relay by Langston gets by Allanson. Cora scores! Here comes Sojo...he scores! Everybody scores! Sojo comes in! The relay to the plate got on by Andy Allanson and the catcher. Sojo with a triple down the right field line, and the Mariners take the lead, five to nothing! This place is going wild!

— Rick Rizzs

Ken Griffey Jr smiling after Mariners win ALDS in 1995

The Mariners lost the first two games of the 1995 American League Division Series against the New York Yankees, but managed to win the next two at home and force a decisive Game 5. Down 5–4 in the bottom of the 11th inning, the most memorable moment in Mariners history took place. Edgar Martínez hit a game-winning double off Yankee ace Jack McDowell, scoring Joey Cora and Griffey to win the game 6–5 and advance to the American League Championship Series. "The Double", as Martínez's clutch hit has since been called by Mariners fans, is credited as being "the moment that saved baseball in Seattle" by generating newly refreshed interest in the team and making a new, baseball-only stadium possible. Soon after, the Washington State Legislature approved funding for what eventually became Safeco Field (now T-Mobile Park), a retractable-roof stadium, built near the Kingdome (which itself was demolished in 2000, with the Seahawks' new stadium, now known as Lumen Field, now occupying the same site).

Mariner commentator Dave Niehaus' call on the play is still remembered by many Mariner fans:

Right now, the Mariners looking for the tie. They would take a fly ball, they would love a base hit into the gap, and they could win it with Junior's speed. The stretch, and the 0–1 pitch on the way to Edgar Martínez, swung on and lined down the left field line for a base hit! Here comes Joey. Here is Junior to third base, they're going to wave him in, the throw to the plate will beeee late! The Mariners are going to play for the American League championship! I don't believe it! It just continues! My oh my!

The quote is featured in a tribute song, "My Oh My", released in December 2010 by Seattle rapper Macklemore after Niehaus died of a heart attack in November. On April 8, 2011, Mariners Opening Day, Macklemore performed the song in honor of Niehaus.

Although the Mariners' championship run was halted in the ALCS by another up-and-coming club, Mike Hargrove's Cleveland Indians, who won the series 4 games to 2, 1995 is remembered as "The Magical Season" and "The Miracle Mariners of 1995" with "The Double" still considered by many the greatest moment in Mariners history.

=== 1996–1999: Lack of pitching depth ===
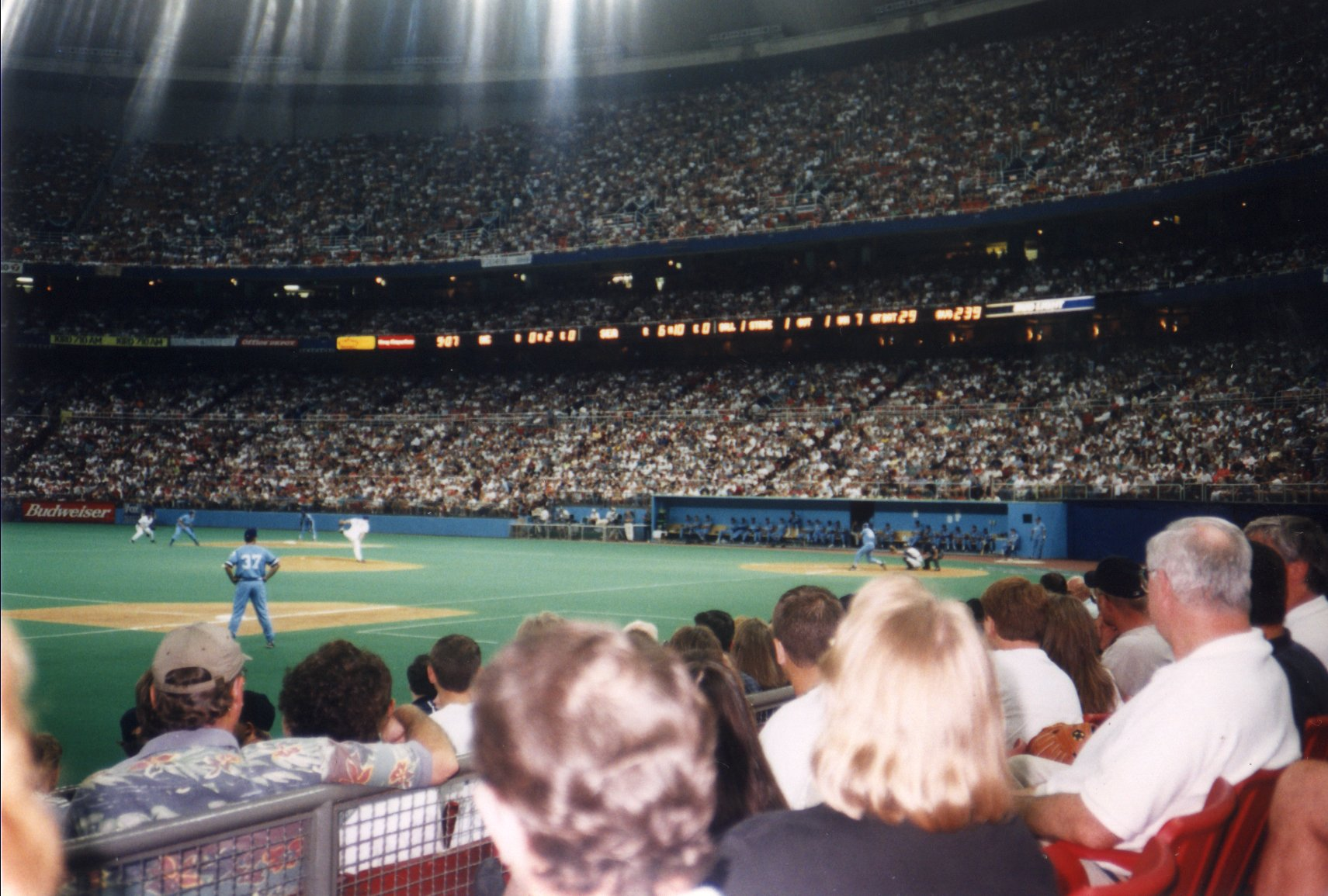
Inside the Kingdome (1976 – July 1999)

In 1996, the Mariners, led by Griffey, rookie shortstop Alex Rodriguez, and sluggers Jay Buhner and Edgar Martínez, won a then-team record 85 games, but missed the playoffs. The offense set the all-time record for most home runs by a team in a season, but ultimately the Mariners' inconsistent pitching, exacerbated by a midseason injury to Randy Johnson, doomed the team. The Mariners hit a Major-league record 264 home runs and won a division title again in 1997, but were defeated in the 1997 American League Division Series 3 games to 1 by the Baltimore Orioles. They were again hurt by a lack of pitching depth to complement the strong offense, which was led by Griffey, who won the MVP award, a first for both him and the Mariners.

In 1998 and 1999, the Mariners had losing records due primarily to their lack of pitching depth. Randy Johnson was traded at the 1998 July non-waiver trading deadline to the Houston Astros after general manager Woody Woodard publicly stated he did not intend on offering Johnson (who was a free agent following the 1998 season) a long-term contract. Johnson subsequently requested to be traded. He had been inconsistent during the first half of the season; some fans and press thought he had been trying to force a trade through malaise. The trade that sent Johnson to the Astros turned out to be a major steal for the Mariners as although Randy Johnson went 10–1 with 116 strikeouts down the stretch (the Astros were eliminated by the San Diego Padres in the NLDS and Johnson signed with the Arizona Diamondbacks in the offseason), the Mariners got future stars in pitcher Freddy Garcia and shortstop Carlos Guillen; strong pitching from aces Jeff Fassero and Jamie Moyer was not enough to fully offset the loss, and the bullpen's struggles continued. Midway through the 1999 season, the Mariners moved to Safeco Field. After the 1999 season, Ken Griffey Jr. requested and attained a trade to the Cincinnati Reds, leaving Alex Rodriguez as the face of the franchise at the beginning of the high-expectation Safeco Field era, which was during the years 2000–2003.

=== 2000: The first wild card berth ===
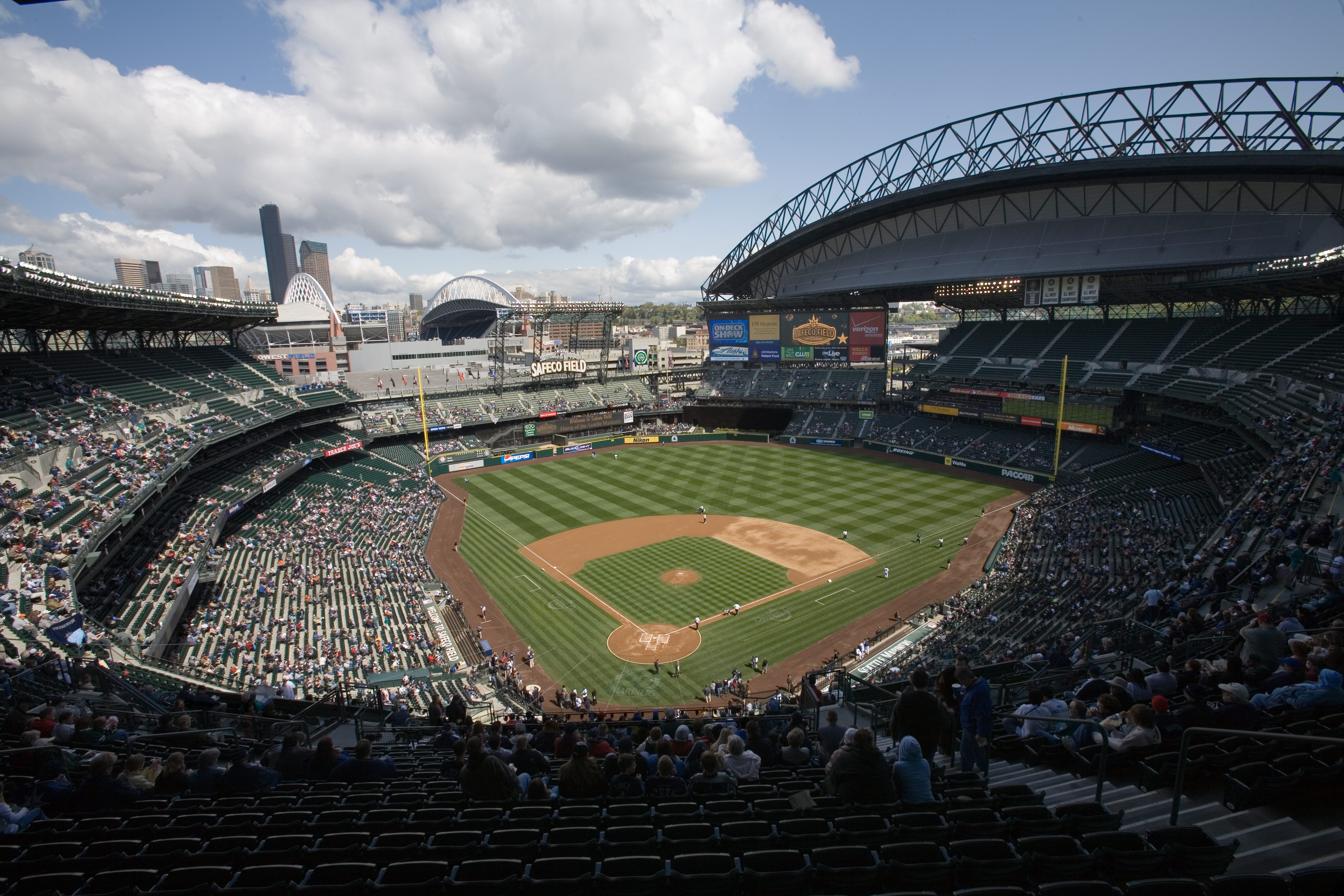
T-Mobile Park

2000 was a return to respectability for the Mariners. They finished half a game behind the Oakland Athletics in the American League West, as they played only 161 games. The tiebreaking rules had already awarded the division crown to Oakland, so the rained out 162nd game was not made up, and the Mariners were declared wild card winners. While Ken Griffey Jr. was no longer patrolling center or anchoring the middle of the batting order, his replacement, Mike Cameron, was noted for his solid hitting and exceptional glovework (he won two Gold Gloves with the team). Alex Rodriguez replaced Junior as the face of the franchise in 2000. Edgar Martínez continued his steady hitting in the cleanup spot, putting up a career high in homers. Both finished in the top six in MVP voting. A key addition to the team occurred when the Mariners signed the one-time AL Batting Champion John Olerud, a Washington State University graduate and Seattle native, to play first base. Olerud had some of his best seasons in Seattle, and played a huge part in the team's success the following year. Jamie Moyer, Freddy García, and Aaron Sele anchored what was easily the most successful rotation in Seattle since the departure of Randy Johnson. Closer Kazuhiro Sasaki, previously a star for the Japanese Yokohama BayStars, won the AL Rookie of the Year award. Stolen base king and former MVP Rickey Henderson was acquired midseason and filled longtime needs in left field and in the leadoff slot. The Mariners swept the Chicago White Sox in the ALDS, but lost to the eventual World Series champion New York Yankees in six games in the ALCS.

The following offseason was one of the most significant in Mariners history, as Rodríguez was up for free agency. Ultimately, Rodríguez was lost to the Texas Rangers for what was then the richest contract ever in professional sports. However, the Mariners were able to weather the loss by adding Japanese superstar Ichiro Suzuki and slick-fielding, power-hitting second base veteran Bret Boone.

=== 2001: 116–46 ===
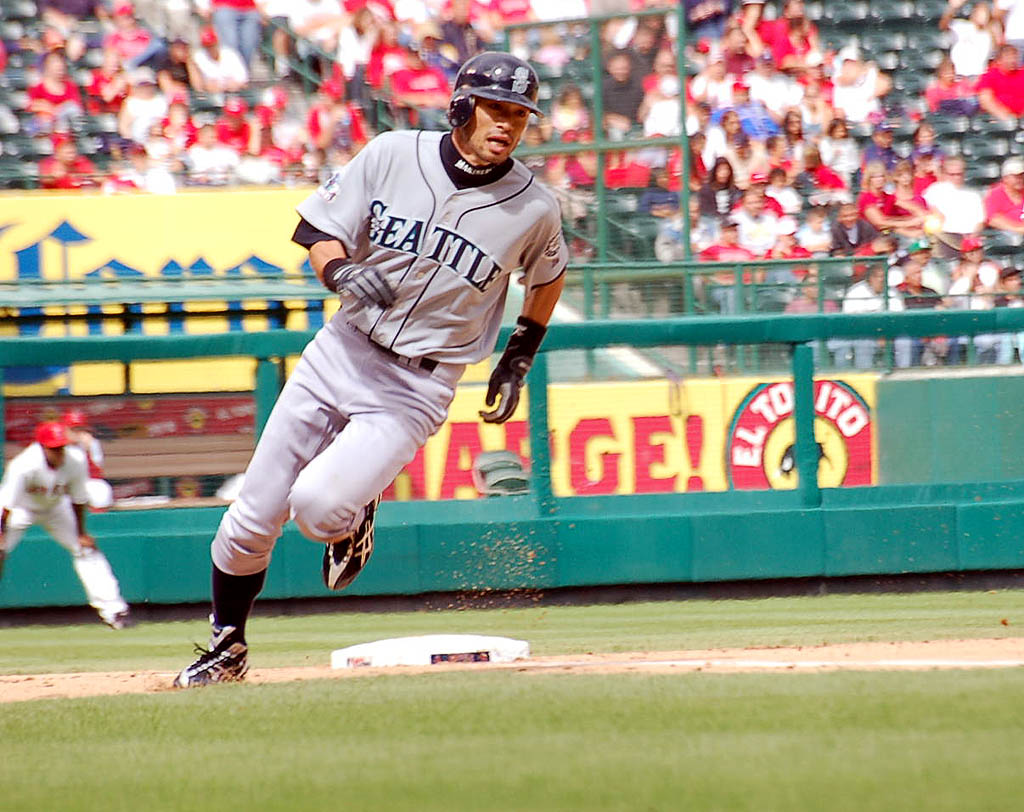
Ichiro Suzuki joined the Mariners in 2001.

In 2001, the addition of Ichiro and a career season by Boone helped the Mariners to tie the record for most wins in the modern era. This was despite the loss of Rodriguez, who was greeted on his return to Safeco with Monopoly money dropped by unusually irate Seattle fans, and on subsequent returns by incessant booing. The 2001 Mariners led the major leagues in winning percentage all season long, easily winning the American League West division championship, breaking the 1998 New York Yankees' American League single-season record of 114 wins, and matching the Major League Baseball record for single-season wins of 116 set by the Chicago Cubs in 1906. At the end of the season, Ichiro won the AL MVP, AL Rookie of the Year, and one of three outfield Gold Glove Awards, becoming the first player since the 1975 Boston Red Sox's Fred Lynn to win all three in the same season. He has been the subject of several books (including one released in the summer of 2001 that consists solely of his zen-like quotations).

The Mariners also hosted the All-Star Game in July of that year, and had a league-leading and team record eight All-Stars: right fielder Ichiro Suzuki, designated hitter Edgar Martínez, center fielder Mike Cameron, second baseman Bret Boone, first baseman John Olerud, and pitchers Freddy Garcia, Kazuhiro Sasaki, and Jeff Nelson.

The Mariners pulled off a come-from-behind 3–2 series win over the Cleveland Indians in the Division Series to advance to the American League Championship Series to have a rematch with the New York Yankees, but succumbed to the Yankees for the second year in a row in the ALCS, 4 games to 1. The team went 116–46 in the regular season, but just 4–6 in the postseason.

=== 2002: Last year of Lou ===
The Mariners started the 2002 season hot (they were on pace to win 100+ games again well into the summer), but they missed out on the playoffs. This was widely attributed to their failure to find a substantial contributor at the trade deadline and hot streaks by the Anaheim Angels and Oakland Athletics in the later months of the season. Ultimately, the Angels won the 2002 World Series as the Mariners won 93 games, which was still the second best total in their history. At the end of the season, manager Lou Piniella left the Mariners to manage his hometown Tampa Bay Devil Rays, reportedly due to his anger with management; Piniella believed that management was more concerned with the bottom line than acquiring quality players.

== 2003–present ==
=== 2003: New manager Melvin continues the momentum ===
The Mariners signed Bob Melvin to be their new manager. The local press speculated that a first year manager (especially someone more even-tempered than the fiery Piniella) would be easier for the front office and ownership to control.

The Mariners again got off to an excellent start in the 2003 season. They contended all season long and reached the same record as in 2002, but were again beaten to the playoffs by their division rival Oakland Athletics, highlighted by a six-game losing streak in late August that saw their lead evaporate, which they did not recover. Their failure to make the playoffs was again blamed on management's inability to bring in a bat at the trading deadline and the aging roster's decline. Notably, the debate was started by pitcher Jeff Nelson, who was himself traded after criticizing the front office's deadline inactivity. General manager Pat Gillick became a consultant midway through the offseason to make room for new general manager Bill Bavasi.

=== 2004–2006: Rebuilding ===
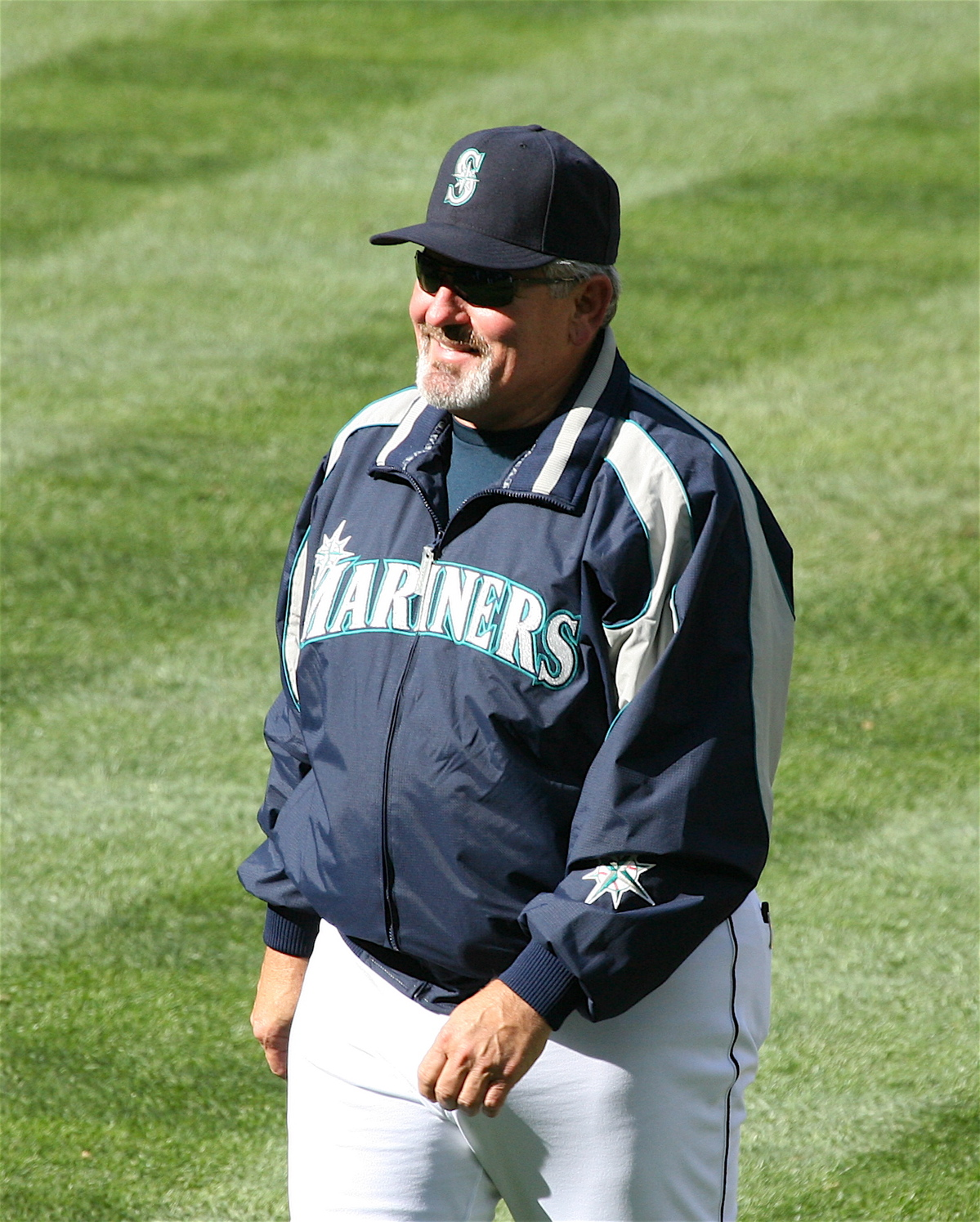
Mike Hargrove, April 2007

With the exception of the 1998 and 1999 seasons, the Mariners had been annual challengers for the American League West title from 1995 through 2003. The 2004 season, however, saw the fall of the Mariners from contention. With an aging roster, the Mariners went into the All-Star Break with a 9-game losing streak, and a 32–54 season record (.372) 17 games behind the first-place Texas Rangers. After the All-Star break, unable to ignore the dreadful state of their team, the Mariners gave the team a complete overhaul, trading Freddy García to the Chicago White Sox for Miguel Olivo, Jeremy Reed, and Mike Morse and moving aging and struggling players away from center stage (most notably, releasing Gold Glover and fan favorite John Olerud) and inserting over a dozen minor league call-ups into the 25-man roster. The season's end was enlivened by Ichiro breaking George Sisler's single season record of 257 hits (finishing with 262) and by events honoring the retirement of Mariners icon Edgar Martínez. Just days after the end of the season, the Mariners fired manager Bob Melvin. On October 20, 2004, the Mariners announced the signing of Mike Hargrove, who had led the Cleveland Indians past the Mariners in the 1995 ALCS, as their new manager. In the offseason, the Mariners and Bavasi surprised fans and the local press by signing two premier free agents, third baseman Adrián Beltré and first baseman Richie Sexson, ending some accusations from fans that the organization was only willing to make piecemeal signings and trades.

On November 26, 2004, the owner of the Mariners changed: Hiroshi Yamauchi sold his 54% stake to Nintendo of America.

Despite several personnel changes and free-agent signings after the 2004 season, the team stayed at the bottom of the divisional standings throughout the 2005 season and finished in last place, though they improved their record by six games compared to the previous year. The brightest spot of the season was the emergence of 19-year-old Venezuelan pitching prospect Félix Hernández, who became the youngest major leaguer to debut since José Rijo entered the league with the New York Yankees in 1984. Sexson also played very well, hitting 39 home runs and 121 RBI. Stars Ichiro and Beltre, however, did not reach their high levels of offensive production from 2004, and second baseman Bret Boone was released before the All-Star break. Along with Hernández, two rookie middle infielders became part of the Mariners' long-term plans: Cuban defector and shortstop Yuniesky Betancourt and Venezuelan second baseman and former top prospect José López became the next season's starters. However, the Mariners' rotation beyond Hernández and the aging Jamie Moyer was poor, and the Mariners suffered the embarrassment of having the most suspendees under MLB's new drug testing policy, notably pitcher Ryan Franklin and IF/OF Mike Morse. During the 2005–2006 off-season, Ichiro spoke out and criticized the team's attitude, pointing out its lack of leadership and manager Hargrove's failure to harness players.

The Mariners began the 2005–2006 off-season by signing star Japanese catcher Kenji Johjima to a 3-year deal and left-handed starter Jarrod Washburn (formerly of division rival Los Angeles) to a 4-year deal. Designated hitter Carl Everett and outfielder Matt Lawton also joined the team, although both finished the season out of baseball. The Mariners entered the All-Star Break 2.5 games out of first place in the American League West with a 43–46 record. Despite remaining in contention within the American League West through July, a disastrous 0–11 road trip in mid-August signaled the end of the Mariners' playoff hopes, leaving them in last place, where they finished the season. Pitcher Jamie Moyer was traded to the Philadelphia Phillies for a pair of minor league prospects on August 19. In mid-September, bench coach Ron Hassey and administrative coach Dan Rohn, viewed as a successor to Hargrove as manager, were removed from their positions. At season's end, the Mariners had only narrowly avoided losing 90 games for the third consecutive year. While the team entered the 2006–2007 off-season with some young talent in key positions, many questions remained as to the consistency of their offense and, more importantly, the strength of their starting pitching staff.

=== 2007: Something to nothing ===
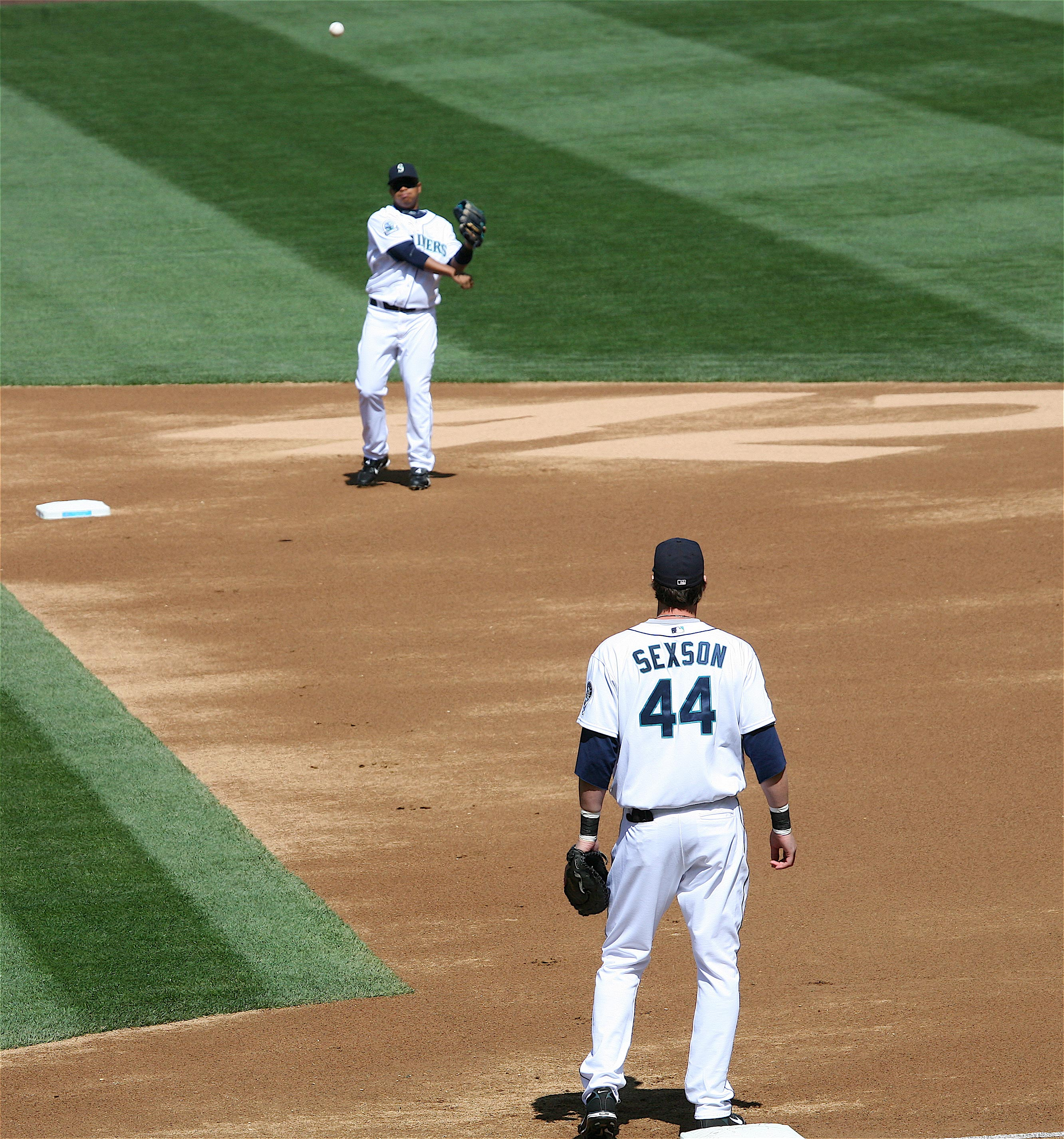
José López throwing to Richie Sexson, 2007

The 2007 season began with a sense of muted optimism. While the team had a busy off-season changing the roster, fans questioned player transactions that moved young, potential-filled players including Rafael Soriano, Chris Snelling in favor of veterans who either suffered injuries in recent seasons, such as José Guillén, José Vidro, Horacio Ramírez, or who had recent mediocre performance, including starters Miguel Batista and Jeff Weaver. These transactions followed CEO Howard Lincoln's remarks at the completion of the 2006 campaign that general manager Bill Bavasi and manager Mike Hargrove were on his "hot seat" and needed to produce more wins in 2007. Further magnifying the need to win was outfielder Ichiro Suzuki's suggestion at the beginning of spring training that he may have an interest in testing free agency when his contract ended after the season.

Hargrove unexpectedly announced before the July 1, game against the Toronto Blue Jays that the game was his last as the Mariners' manager. Hargrove said that he could no longer provide the commitment from himself that he was expecting of his players and coaches. He managed the team for two and a half seasons, guiding them to a 44–33 start in 2007. Bench coach John McLaren was announced as Hargrove's replacement. On July 13, Ichiro Suzuki signed a 5-year, $90 million contract with the Mariners that extended to 2012. With minor league prospect Adam Jones playing well and a fairly consistent offense and pitching staff, the 2007 Mariners were back in contention in the American League West and American League Wild Card races. However, a 3–15 stretch late in the season effectively ended the Mariners' 2007 playoff hopes. The Mariners were mathematically eliminated from contention on September 24. One highlight during this stretch, however, was the home run that gave Ichiro Suzuki 200 hits for his seventh consecutive 200-hit season. He is the third player in MLB history with seven consecutive 200-hit seasons, and the first to do it in his first seven MLB seasons.

=== 2008: 61–101 ===
Heading into the 2008 season, the Mariners hoped to capitalize on their 2007 success by bolstering their roster to position themselves to once again challenge the Angels for the American League West championship. They dramatically transformed their pitching staff, adding free agent Carlos Silva and trading a package of players led by Adam Jones and George Sherrill to the Baltimore Orioles on February 8 for Érik Bédard. Other additions included outfielder Brad Wilkerson and infielder Miguel Cairo, as well as a new coaching staff under McLaren featuring former MLB managers Jim Riggleman, Sam Perlozzo, and Lee Elia, and pitching coach Mel Stottlemyre. Also added to the major league coaching staff was bullpen coach Norm Charlton, a member of the 1995, 1997, and 2001 AL West title teams, as well as Eddie Rodriguez, previously manager of the Mariners' Double-A affiliate. Hitting coach Jeff Pentland remained as the only coach hired under Hargrove.

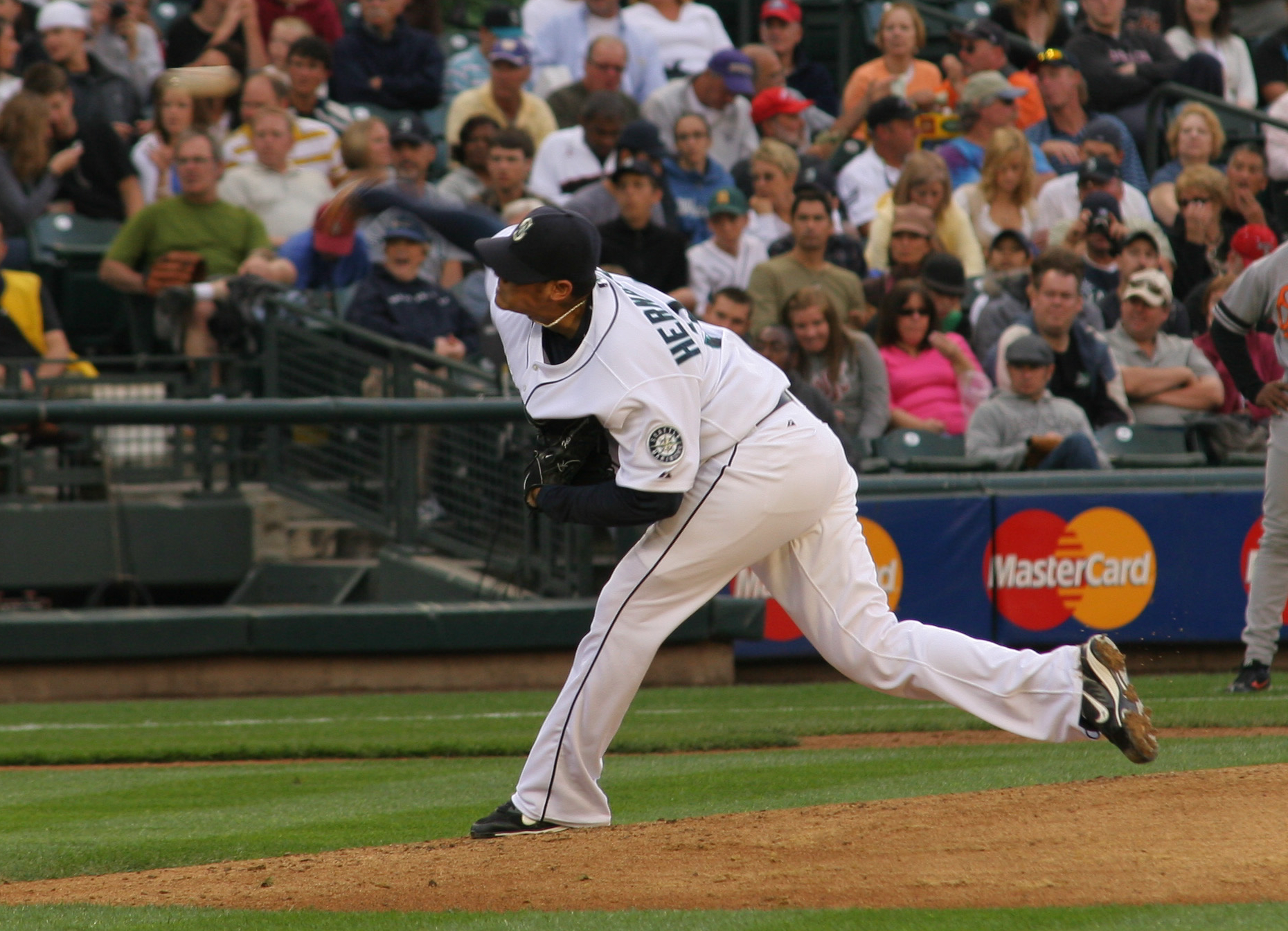
Félix Hernández in 2008

Despite their offseason additions, the 2008 Mariners had one of the league's worst offenses. In April, the club attempted to solve some of its offensive woes by designating Wilkerson and pinch hitter Greg Norton for assignment. The offensive struggles, in concert with defensive lapses and inconsistent pitching, led the team to last place by the end of April despite an Opening Day payroll of nearly $117 million. On June 8, the Mariners were the worst team in baseball, with a .349 winning percentage, and were on pace for 105 losses, the worst record in team history. Hitting coach Pentland was fired on June 9 and was replaced by Lee Elia, who was previously the Mariners' hitting instructor from 1993 to 1997. Following a 1–5 homestand, general manager Bill Bavasi was dismissed on June 16 and replaced by Lee Pelekoudas on an interim basis. Pelekoudas had held various front office positions with the Mariners since 1980, most recently as vice president/assistant general manager. The purge continued on June 19, when John McLaren was dismissed from his position and replaced by bench coach Jim Riggleman. Personnel moves of that sort were not limited to coaches and front office personnel in 2008, as Richie Sexson and José Vidro were released in July and August, respectively. On September 1, the Mariners were the first team in baseball mathematically eliminated from the playoffs. They finished the season with 101 losses, only one fewer than the MLB-worst Washington Nationals. The 2008 Mariners became the first team in major league history to have a payroll of $100 million or more while accumulating 100 or more losses.

2008 did have a handful of noteworthy achievements, however: On June 23, pitcher Félix Hernández hit a grand slam off of the New York Mets' Johan Santana, becoming the first pitcher in franchise history to hit a home run, as well as the first American League pitcher to hit a grand slam since 1971 (and the first ever in modern Interleague play). On September 1, third baseman Adrián Beltré became the fourth Mariner to hit for the cycle. Beltré's cycle came hours after Stephen Drew of the Arizona Diamondbacks hit for the cycle, marking the second time in MLB history, and the first since 1920, that two players accomplished the feat on the same day. On September 17, Ichiro tied Willie Keeler's record of 8 consecutive 200-hit seasons, matching a mark that has stood since 1901.

=== 2009–2013: The Zduriencik era ===
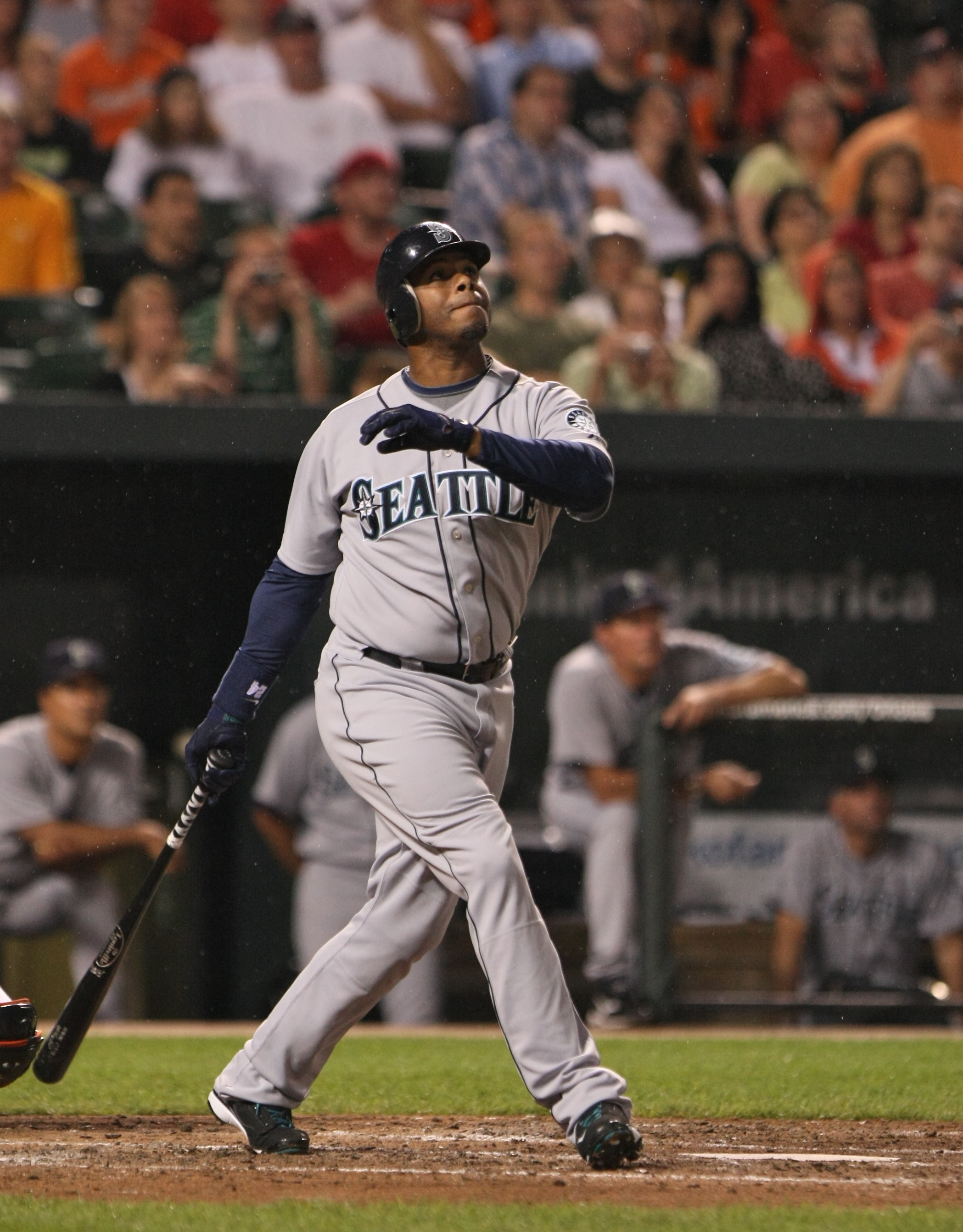
Ken Griffey Jr., June 10, 2009

On October 22, 2008, the Mariners announced the hiring of Jack Zduriencik, formerly scouting director of the Milwaukee Brewers, as their general manager. Weeks later, on November 18, the team named Oakland Athletics bench coach Don Wakamatsu as its new field manager. Wakamatsu and Zduriencik hired an entirely new coaching staff for 2009, which included former World Series MVP John Wetteland as bullpen coach. The off-season saw many roster moves, headlined by a 12-player, 3-team trade that included sending All-Star closer J. J. Putz to the New York Mets and brought 5 players—including prospect Mike Carp and outfielder Endy Chávez from New York and outfielder Franklin Gutierrez from the Cleveland Indians—to Seattle. Many of the moves, like the free agent signing of Mike Sweeney, were made in part with the hope of squelching the clubhouse infighting that plagued the Mariners in 2008.

On February 18, the Mariners signed Ken Griffey Jr. to a one-year contract, returning him to the city where he played from 1989 to 1999 and was named a member of the All-Century Team. Griffey wore his old uniform number, 24, which had not been issued to any on-field personnel since he left the team. On April 15, Jackie Robinson Day, Griffey hit his 400th home run in a Mariners uniform, becoming the first player to hit 400 home runs with one club and 200 with another, the Reds. Albert Pujols later matched this feat.

On March 31, Ichiro was placed on the 15-day disabled list for the first time in his Major League career, after being diagnosed with a bleeding ulcer. On April 15, he hit a grand slam in his first game back from the DL. On April 16, Ichiro recorded his 3,086th hit in a combined career between Nippon Professional Baseball and Major League Baseball, breaking the record among Japanese-born professional players previously held by Isao Harimoto, who attended the game in Seattle.

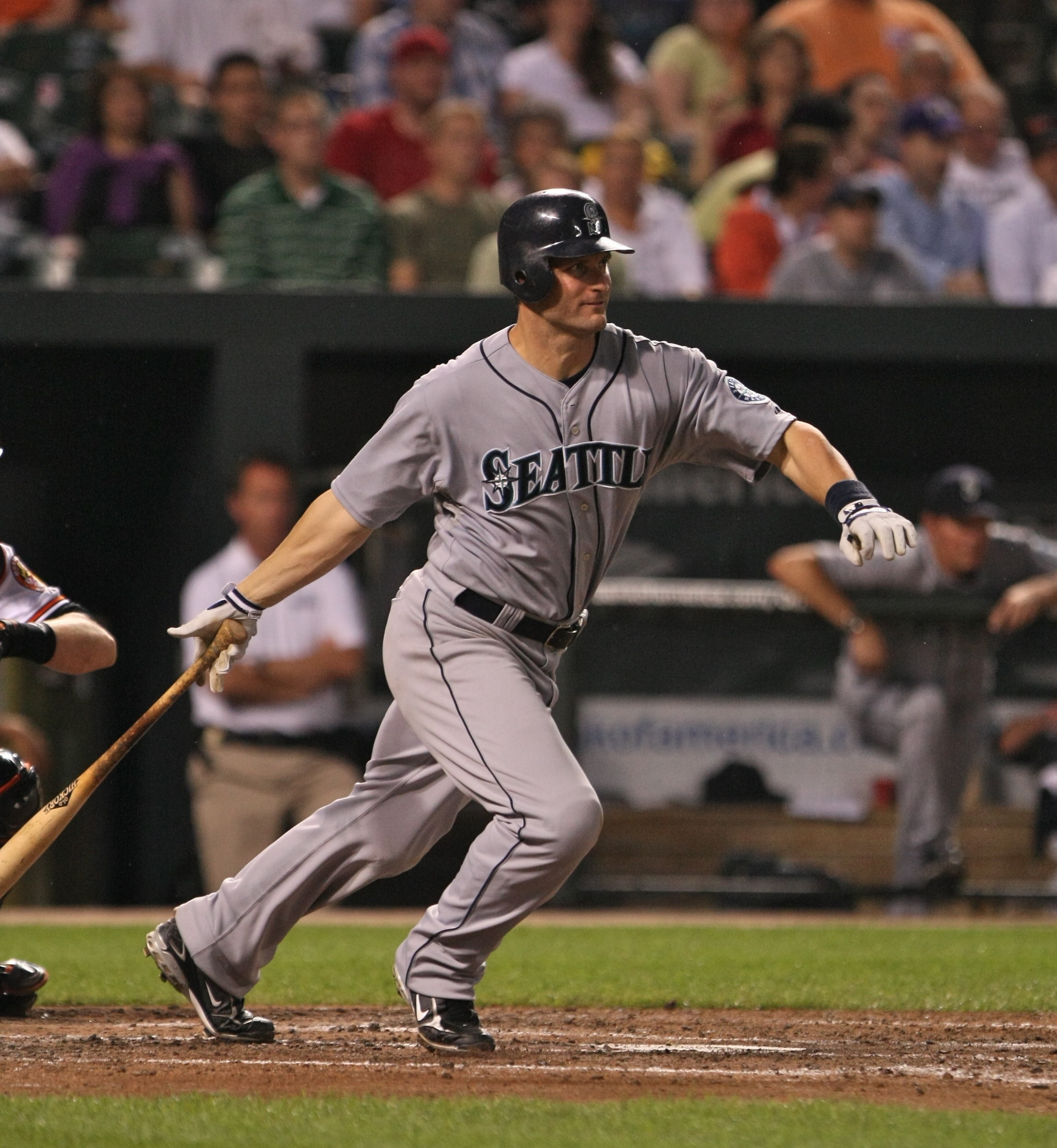
Russell Branyan led the Mariners in home runs with 31 in 2009.

On, September 16, Ichiro hit his 200th hit for the ninth consecutive season, eclipsing the record he shared with Willie Keeler. On October 4, the final game of the year, Félix Hernández continued his Cy Young candidacy, and won his 19th game, the 85th for the Mariners. Griffey hit a single in the 8th inning and was lifted for pinch-runner Michael Saunders, to a long standing ovation, in what was then thought to be the final at-bat of his Hall of Fame career. The Mariners became the 13th team in MLB history to have a winning season after losing 100+ games the previous season. After the final out, fans saluted the much-improved Mariners, having won 24 more games than the year before. The team took a victory lap around the park in return, which ended with the team carrying Griffey and eventually Ichiro on their shoulders, before leaving the field.

Among their 85 victories, an MLB season-high 35 were 1-run triumphs, as well as 13 walk-off wins.

On November 11, 2009, Griffey's return to the Mariners for the 2010 campaign was announced, with a similar contract to that of 2009. He looked to make $2 million with an additional $3 million in incentives.

The Mariners showed that they wanted to contend in the A.L. West by signing Chone Figgins to a four-year, $36 million contract, and by trading prospects to the Philadelphia Phillies for former Cy Young Award winner Cliff Lee.

Seattle continued to be aggressive during the 2009–2010 offseason trading pitcher Carlos Silva and cash to the Chicago Cubs for outfielder Milton Bradley.

On June 2, 2010, Ken Griffey Jr. announced his retirement after 22 MLB seasons. Griffey ended his career with 630 home runs, fifth-highest in MLB history, 10 Gold Gloves, and one Most Valuable Player Award.

On August 10, 2010, the Mariners fired field manager Don Wakamatsu along with bench coach Ty Van Burkleo, pitching coach Rick Adair and performance coach Steve Hecht. Daren Brown, the manager of the AAA affiliate Tacoma Rainiers, took over as interim field manager. Roger Hansen, the former Minor League catching coordinator, was promoted to bench coach. Carl Willis, the former Minor League pitching coordinator, was promoted to pitching coach. On October 19, 2010, the Mariners hired former Cleveland Indians manager Eric Wedge as their new manager. Carl Willis was retained as pitching coach. This came after a 61–101 season where many experts had predicted a first or second-place finish in their division. This tied the record for worst season with the 2008 team. Eric Wedge constantly talked about "belief system" and needing players to "buy into it."

Wedge failed to significantly improve the Mariners' performance in any of his three seasons at the helm, seeing the Mariners finish in fourth place in the AL West every time. Wedge parted ways with Seattle after the 2013 season and was replaced by Lloyd McClendon.

=== 2014–2018: The Robinson Canó era ===
On December 6, 2013, the Seattle Mariners came to an agreement with former Yankees superstar second baseman Robinson Canó. The contract was to last for 10 years at approximately $240 million, making Cano the third highest paid baseball player in history, trailing Alex Rodriguez' 10-year, $275 million deal in 2008, and tied with Albert Pujols' 10-year, $240 million deal in 2012.

In 2014, the Mariners had their first winning season since 2009, putting up an 87–75 record, and stayed in playoff contention until the final game of the season, when the Oakland Athletics beat the Texas Rangers to clinch the second Wild Card spot in the American League. Félix Hernández broke a major league record by having 16 straight games with at least seven innings pitched and giving up two or less earned runs. Hernández also came in second in American League Cy Young Award voting, with Corey Kluber of the Cleveland Indians edging Felix by ten voting points. Kyle Seager won the first Gold Glove of his career at third base.

In 2016, Nintendo of America sold most of its franchise shares to First Avenue Entertainment, led by previous minority owner John W. Stanton.

In 2017, the Mariners were projected to claim the 2nd Wild Card, or even vie for the AL West Championship. However, injuries crippled the starting rotation, bullpen, and lineup. The Mariners used a record-tying 40 different pitchers, and 17 different pitchers started games. Drew Smyly, acquired from the Tampa Bay Rays in exchange for Mallex Smith, Ryan Yarbrough, and Carlos Vargas, underwent Tommy John surgery, and did not pitch a single game for the Mariners before signing with the Cubs in December. This was the first of many highly unfortunate injuries that befell the Mariners' roster. Manager Scott Servais described Smyly's injury as a "soggy elbow", leading the Mariners fanbase to sarcastically bemoan "sog" as an injury-causing curse deriving from the humidity of the Pacific Northwest.

Despite the continuous flux of new pitchers, the Mariners managed to stay in contention for the Wild Card until the middle of August, when a losing streak on the road put the Mariners below .500 and distant from the eventual winners, the Yankees and Twins. On March 7, 2018, the Mariners signed Seattle legend Ichiro Suzuki to a one-year contract.

On December 3, 2018, the Mariners traded Canó, Edwin Díaz, and $20 million to the New York Mets for Jay Bruce, Jarred Kelenic, Anthony Swarzak, Gerson Bautista, and Justin Dunn.

=== 2019–present: Back to the playoffs ===
In 2019, Ichiro Suzuki returned to the Mariners and played in their first two games against the Oakland Athletics at the Tokyo Dome in Japan. After Suzuki's retirement, the Mariners fell back into the cellar of the AL West with a 68–94 record. After posting a 27–33 record in the COVID-19 pandemic-shortened 2020 season, the Mariners rebounded in 2021 with their best season since 2003, finishing with a 90–72 record and coming within two games of a wild card berth.

The 2022 season marked a return to the playoffs and the end of the longest active drought in North American sports. On June 19, the Mariners had a 29–39 record and were in fourth place in their division, but quickly got back into the playoff race by winning 22 of their next 25 games, including their last 14 games before the All-Star break. Bolstered by a midseason trade for Cincinnati Reds ace Luis Castillo, the Mariners continued to win in the second half, and on September 30, Cal Raleigh hit a walk-off home run that clinched the Mariners' first postseason berth since 2001, ending the longest active playoff drought amongst the four major North American sports leagues. In the American League Wild Card Series, the Mariners defeated the Toronto Blue Jays in two games, coming back from a seven-run deficit in Game 2. It would prove to be the Mariners' last win of the season, as they were swept by the Houston Astros in the ALDS. They had led Game 1 for most of the game until the final pitch, when Yordan Alvarez hit a walk-off home run to deliver a 8–7 loss for Seattle. Game 3 was the first home playoff game in Seattle since 2001, and it was a historic day that saw an 18-inning duel between two teams that held the other scoreless (a record for the longest scoreless postseason game, and tied with three other games for the longest postseason game overall) until the top of the 18th when Jeremy Peña hit a home run to make it 1-0 for Houston. The game ended in the bottom of the inning on three quick outs to finish Seattle's season in a flash.

The 2023 and 2024 seasons were disappointing, with winning records but missing the playoffs. T-Mobile Park hosted the All-Star Game in 2023. In 2024, manager Scott Servais was fired with the team at 64-64 and replaced with former Mariners catcher Dan Wilson. Wilson went 21-13 to complete the season. The team retained him in 2025, and that year 90 wins was enough to win the division, behind catcher Cal Raleigh's 60 home runs, the record for a catcher and tied for third in the American League all-time. Raleigh finished second in the MVP voting. After a five-game victory over the Detroit Tigers in the Division Series, the Mariners took the Toronto Blue Jays to seven games in the ALCS. They fell just short of their first franchise World Series when reliever Eduard Bazardo gave up a seventh-inning, lead-changing home run to Blue Jays outfielder George Springer in Game 7.
