= Chuck Cottier =

American baseball player, manager and scout (1936–2021)

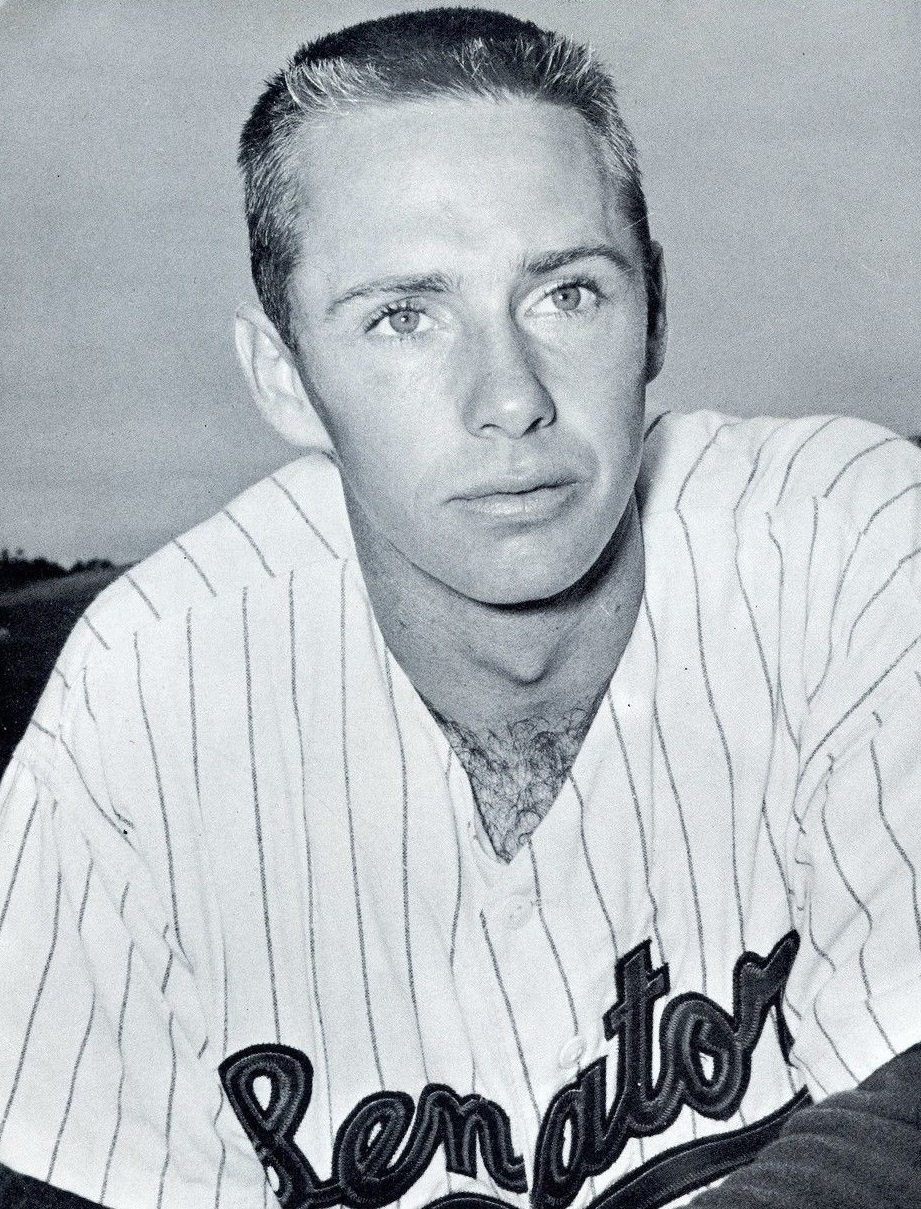
- Cottier on the Washington Senators
- Second baseman / Manager
- Born: January 8, 1936; Delta, Colorado, U.S.
- Died: February 1, 2021 (aged 85); Edmonds, Washington, U.S.
- Batted: Right Threw: Right

MLB debut
- April 17, 1959, for the Milwaukee Braves

Last MLB appearance
- May 9, 1969, for the California Angels

MLB statistics
- Batting average: .220
- Home runs: 19
- Runs batted in: 127
- Managerial record: 98–119
- Winning %: .452
- Stats at Baseball Reference
- Managerial record at Baseball Reference

Teams
- As player: Milwaukee Braves (1959–1960); Detroit Tigers (1961); Washington Senators (1961–1965); California Angels (1968–1969); As manager: Seattle Mariners (1984–1986); As coach: New York Mets (1979–1981); Seattle Mariners (1982–1984); Chicago Cubs (1988–1994); Baltimore Orioles (1995); Philadelphia Phillies (1997–2000)

Charles Keith Cottier (January 8, 1936 – February 1, 2021) was an American second baseman, manager, coach and scout in Major League Baseball (MLB).

Born in Delta, Colorado, Cottier graduated from Grand Junction High School, where he lettered in four sports – baseball, basketball, football and wrestling. He batted and threw right-handed, standing 5 ft 11 in (1.80 m) and weighing 178 pounds (81 kg).

Cottier was a good-fielding, light-hitting infielder during his nine-year big league playing career. He appeared in 580 games and compiled a lifetime batting average of .220 with 348 hits, 63 doubles, 17 triples and 19 home runs with the Milwaukee Braves (1959–60), Detroit Tigers (1961), Washington Senators (1961–65) and California Angels (1968–69). He finished his career with an overall .973 fielding percentage.

His playing career ended in May 1969 when he sustained an Achilles tendon injury as a member of the Angels and began his minor league managing career in 1971.

Cottier was in his third season as the Seattle Mariners' third base coach in 1984 when manager Del Crandall was fired with 27 games left and Cottier was appointed interim manager on September 1. He led the team through 1985 and into the first 28 games of 1986. With the M's at 9–19, sixth in the AL West, Cottier was fired on May 8 and succeeded by interim manager Marty Martínez for one game before Dick Williams took over. His career record as a major league manager was 98–119 (.452).

Cottier also was a coach for the New York Mets (1979–81), Chicago Cubs (1988–94), Baltimore Orioles (1995) and Philadelphia Phillies (1997–2000); he was a major league scout for the New York Yankees, and a special assistant to the general manager for the Washington Nationals.

Cottier died on February 1, 2021, at the age of 85.

Sporting positions
Preceded by Don Buford	Baltimore Orioles Bench Coach; 1995	Succeeded by Andy Etchebarren
